= 2019–20 in Dutch football =

Association football season

Football in Netherlands
- Season: 2019–20

Men's football
- Johan Cruyff Shield: Ajax

The 2019–20 season is the 130th season of competitive football in the Netherlands.

== League season ==
=== Eredivisie ===
Pos	Team	Pld	W	D	L	GF	GA	GD	Pts	Qualification or relegation
1	Ajax	25	18	2	5	68	23	+45	56	Qualification for the Champions League group stage
2	AZ	25	18	2	5	54	17	+37	56	Qualification for the Champions League second qualifying round
3	Feyenoord	25	14	8	3	50	35	+15	50	Qualification for the Europa League group stage
4	PSV Eindhoven	26	14	7	5	54	28	+26	49	Qualification for the Europa League third qualifying round
5	Willem II	26	13	5	8	37	34	+3	44	Qualification for the Europa League second qualifying round
6	FC Utrecht	25	12	5	8	50	34	+16	41	
7	Vitesse	26	12	5	9	45	35	+10	41	
8	Heracles Almelo	26	10	6	10	40	34	+6	36	
9	FC Groningen	26	10	5	11	27	26	+1	35	
10	Heerenveen	26	8	9	9	41	41	0	33	
11	Sparta Rotterdam	26	9	6	11	41	45	−4	33	
12	FC Emmen	26	9	5	12	32	45	−13	32	
13	VVV-Venlo	26	8	4	14	24	51	−27	28	
14	FC Twente	26	7	6	13	34	46	−12	27	
15	PEC Zwolle	26	7	5	14	37	55	−18	26	
16	Fortuna Sittard	26	6	8	12	29	52	−23	26	
17	ADO Den Haag	26	4	7	15	25	54	−29	19	
18	RKC Waalwijk	26	4	3	19	27	60	−33	15	

Source: eredivisie.nl
Rules for classification: Season in progress: 1) Most points won; 2) Less points lost; 3) Goal difference; 4) Goals scored; 5) Alphabetical order; End of season: 1) Points; 2) Goal difference; 3) Goals scored; 4) Head-to-head points; 5) Head-to-head goal difference; 6) Head-to-head away goals scored; 7) Play-off if relevant for deciding champion, relegation or participating in a European league, otherwise by draw. 8) Penalty shoot-out (only after a play-off)

=== Eerste Divisie ===
Pos	Team	Pld	W	D	L	GF	GA	GD	Pts
1	SC Cambuur	29	21	3	5	68	25	+43	66
2	De Graafschap (Note: Winner of the Third Period (games 20-28).)	29	17	11	1	63	28	+35	62
3	FC Volendam (Note: Winner of the Second Period (games 10-19).)	29	16	7	6	57	42	+15	55
4	Jong Ajax (Note: Reserves teams are not eligible to be promoted to the 2020–21 Eredivisie.)	29	16	6	7	72	47	+25	54
5	NAC Breda (Note: Winner of the First Period (games 1-9).)	29	14	8	7	48	30	+18	50
6	Go Ahead Eagles	29	12	12	5	49	41	+8	48
7	Excelsior	29	13	8	8	65	55	+10	47
8	NEC Nijmegen	29	12	9	8	51	37	+14	45
9	Almere City FC	29	13	5	11	44	42	+2	44
10	Telstar	29	12	8	9	47	48	−1	44
11	FC Den Bosch (Note: Den Bosch were deducted three points for not meeting budget requirements to create a healthy financial position.)	29	10	11	8	56	49	+7	38
12	Jong FC Utrecht	29	10	8	11	48	47	+1	38
13	FC Eindhoven	29	9	7	13	46	59	−13	34
14	Jong AZ	29	7	7	15	45	61	−16	28
15	MVV Maastricht	29	7	6	16	37	53	−16	27
16	TOP Oss	29	6	7	16	28	53	−25	25
17	Roda JC Kerkrade (Note: Roda JC Kerkrade were deducted three points for violating license regulations.)	29	5	10	14	36	52	−16	22
18	Jong PSV	29	5	7	17	34	56	−22	22
19	FC Dordrecht	29	4	8	17	34	66	−32	20
20	Helmond Sport	29	3	8	18	25	62	−37	17

Updated to match(es) played on 9 March 2020. Source: Soccerway, Keuken Kampioen Divisie (in Dutch)
Rules for classification: Season in progress: 1) Most points won; 2) Fewest points lost; 3) Goal difference; 4) Goals scored; 5) Alphabetical order; End of season: 1) Points; 2) Goal difference; 3) Goals scored; 4) Head-to-head points; 5) Head-to-head goal difference; 6) Head-to-head away goals scored; 7) Play-off if relevant for deciding champion, relegation or participating in a European league, otherwise by draw. 8) Penalty shoot-out (only after a play-off)

=== Tweede Divisie ===
Pos	Team	Pld	W	D	L	GF	GA	GD	Pts	Promotion, qualification or relegation
1	Katwijk (Note: Winner of the second period (games 13-23).)	24	15	4	5	48	26	+22	49	~~Champion~~
2	HHC Hardenberg	24	14	4	6	54	27	+27	46	
3	AFC	24	13	6	5	50	33	+17	45	
4	Rijnsburgse Boys	24	13	6	5	55	42	+13	45	
5	IJsselmeervogels (Note: Winner of the first period (games 1-12).)	24	13	5	6	57	37	+20	44	
6	Kozakken Boys	24	13	3	8	38	29	+9	42	
7	SV Spakenburg	24	10	7	7	37	44	−7	37	
8	Koninklijke HFC	23	10	5	8	43	36	+7	35	
9	De Treffers	24	9	8	7	42	36	+6	35	
10	Noordwijk	24	8	8	8	47	44	+3	32	
11	Jong Sparta	24	9	4	11	43	42	+1	31	
12	Excelsior Maassluis	24	9	4	11	36	47	−11	31	
13	GVVV	24	9	3	12	38	48	−10	30	
14	Quick Boys	24	7	6	11	25	32	−7	27	~~Qualification to relegation play-offs~~
15	Scheveningen	23	7	4	12	24	36	−12	25	~~Qualification to relegation play-offs~~
16	TEC	24	3	7	14	17	40	−23	16	~~Relegation to Derde Divisie~~
17	Jong Volendam	24	3	5	16	40	61	−21	14	~~Possible relegation to Derde Divisie~~ (Note: Team relegates only if in one (or both) Derde Divisie(s) at least one reserve team ends at rank 1 to 4.)
18	ASWH	24	3	5	16	26	60	−34	14	~~Relegation to Derde Divisie~~

Source: Soccerway
Rules for classification: Season in progress: 1) Most points won; 2) Less points lost; 3) Goal difference; 4) Goals scored; 5) Alphabetical order; End of season: 1) Points; 2) Goal difference; 3) Goals scored; 4) Head-to-head points; 5) Head-to-head goal difference; 6) Head-to-head away goals scored; 7) Play-off if relevant for deciding champion, relegation or participating in a European league, otherwise by draw. 8) Penalty shoot-out (only after a play-off)

=== Derde Divisie ===
==== Saturday League ====
Pos	Team	Pld	W	D	L	GF	GA	GD	Pts	Promotion, qualification or relegation
1	Sparta Nijkerk (Note: Winner of the first period (games 1-16).)	22	17	1	4	58	27	+31	52	~~Promotion to Tweede Divisie~~
2	ODIN '59	22	15	2	5	63	30	+33	47	~~Qualification to promotion play-offs~~
3	Harkemase Boys	22	13	3	6	43	34	+9	42	~~Qualification to promotion play-offs~~
4	DVS '33	23	13	3	7	39	30	+9	42	~~Qualification to promotion play-offs~~
5	Lisse	23	11	5	7	44	33	+11	38	
6	Hoek	23	10	4	9	54	42	+12	34	
7	Barendrecht	23	10	4	9	37	38	−1	34	
8	Ajax (amateurs)	22	9	4	9	31	38	−7	31	
9	Excelsior '31	23	9	4	10	50	40	+10	31	
10	Jong Almere City	23	9	4	10	54	48	+6	31	Entered under-21 competition
11	GOES	23	9	4	10	33	44	−11	31	
12	VVSB	22	8	4	10	47	48	−1	28	
13	SteDoCo	22	7	7	8	41	42	−1	28	
14	Ter Leede	23	7	6	10	36	53	−17	27	~~Qualification to relegation play-offs~~
15	DOVO	23	6	4	13	45	55	−10	22	~~Qualification to relegation play-offs~~
16	ONS Sneek (R)	23	2	6	15	32	72	−40	12	Voluntary relegation to Hoofdklasse
17	VVOG	22	2	5	15	26	59	−33	11	~~Relegation to Hoofdklasse~~

Source: Soccerway
Rules for classification: Season in progress: 1) Most points won; 2) Less points lost; 3) Goal difference; 4) Goals scored; 5) Alphabetical order; End of season: 1) Points; 2) Goal difference; 3) Goals scored; 4) Head-to-head points; 5) Head-to-head goal difference; 6) Head-to-head away goals scored; 7) Play-off if relevant for deciding champion, relegation or participating in a European league, otherwise by draw. 8) Penalty shoot-out (only after a play-off)
(R) Relegated

==== Sunday League ====
Pos	Team	Pld	W	D	L	GF	GA	GD	Pts	Promotion, qualification or relegation
1	OSS '20 (Note: Winner of the first period (games 1-16).)	22	16	5	1	55	24	+31	53	~~Promotion to Tweede Divisie~~
2	Jong ADO Den Haag	22	12	3	7	47	36	+11	39	Entered under-21 competition
3	OFC	22	11	3	8	38	27	+11	36	~~Qualification to promotion play-offs~~
4	Gemert	22	10	5	7	42	42	0	35	~~Qualification to promotion play-offs~~
5	Dongen	20	9	7	4	34	19	+15	34	
6	UNA	22	8	8	6	35	39	−4	32	
7	EVV	22	8	7	7	30	27	+3	31	
8	Blauw Geel '38	22	8	5	9	38	38	0	29	
9	HSC '21	22	8	5	9	34	39	−5	29	
10	USV Hercules	21	8	3	10	35	38	−3	27	
11	DEM	22	7	6	9	31	31	0	27	
12	Groene Ster	22	7	6	9	28	33	−5	27	
13	Quick (H)	21	7	5	9	29	26	+3	26	
14	Westlandia	22	6	6	10	31	40	−9	24	~~Qualification to relegation play-offs~~
15	ADO '20	21	5	6	10	29	35	−6	21	~~Qualification to relegation play-offs~~
16	Lienden	21	4	6	11	17	39	−22	18	Withdrawal from Derde Divisie
17	Hoogland	22	3	8	11	31	51	−20	17	~~Relegation to Hoofdklasse~~

Source: Soccerway
Rules for classification: Season in progress: 1) Most points won; 2) Less points lost; 3) Goal difference; 4) Goals scored; 5) Alphabetical order; End of season: 1) Points; 2) Goal difference; 3) Goals scored; 4) Head-to-head points; 5) Head-to-head goal difference; 6) Head-to-head away goals scored; 7) Play-off if relevant for deciding champion, relegation or participating in a European league, otherwise by draw. 8) Penalty shoot-out (only after a play-off)

=== Hoofdklasse ===
==== Saturday A League ====
Pos	Team	Pld	W	D	L	GF	GA	GD	Pts	Promotion, qualification or relegation
1	Sportlust '46 (P)	21	13	3	5	46	21	+25	42	Promotion to Derde Divisie
2	DHSC	21	13	2	6	44	26	+18	41	~~Qualification to promotion play-offs~~
3	SC Feyenoord (Note: Winner of the second period (games 11–30).)	21	11	5	5	55	29	+26	38	~~Qualification to promotion play-offs~~
4	Achilles Veen	21	11	3	7	49	25	+24	36	
5	AZSV (Note: Winner of the first period (games 1–10).)	20	10	4	6	32	23	+9	34	~~Qualification to promotion play-offs~~
6	Smitshoek	21	9	6	6	31	33	−2	33	
7	Rijnvogels	21	9	3	9	32	29	+3	30	
8	ARC	21	8	6	7	29	28	+1	30	
9	Jodan Boys	21	8	6	7	28	29	−1	30	
10	Capelle	21	8	5	8	35	30	+5	29	
11	Spijkenisse	21	8	4	9	34	33	+1	28	
12	Zwaluwen	20	7	5	8	31	35	−4	26	
13	DUNO	20	7	4	9	30	33	−3	25	~~Qualification to relegation play-offs~~
14	Rijsoord	21	6	4	11	22	46	−24	22	~~Qualification to relegation play-offs~~
15	's-Gravenzande	21	4	7	10	24	37	−13	19	~~Relegation to Eerste Klasse~~
16	Achilles '29	20	0	1	19	12	77	−65	1	~~Relegation to Eerste Klasse~~

Source: Soccerway
Rules for classification: Season in progress: 1) Most points won; 2) Less points lost; 3) Goal difference; 4) Goals scored; 5) Alphabetical order; End of season: 1) Points; 2) Goal difference; 3) Goals scored; 4) Head-to-head points; 5) Head-to-head goal difference; 6) Head-to-head away goals scored; 7) Play-off if relevant for deciding champion, relegation or participating in a European league, otherwise by draw. 8) Penalty shoot-out (only after a play-off)
(P) Promoted

==== Saturday B League ====
Pos	Team	Pld	W	D	L	GF	GA	GD	Pts	Promotion, qualification or relegation
1	Staphorst (Note: Winner of the second period (games 11-30).) (P)	21	15	2	4	62	19	+43	47	Promotion to Derde Divisie
2	ACV (P)	21	12	6	3	46	32	+14	42	~~Qualification to promotion play-offs~~
3	Eemdijk (Note: Winner of the first period (games 1-10).)	21	12	5	4	28	15	+13	41	~~Qualification to promotion play-offs~~
4	Swift	21	11	6	4	37	26	+11	39	~~Qualification to promotion play-offs~~
5	HZVV	21	12	2	7	41	28	+13	38	
6	Genemuiden	21	11	4	6	45	23	+22	37	
7	Urk	21	9	4	8	34	25	+9	31	
8	Berkum	21	9	4	8	37	31	+6	31	
9	NSC (Note: NSC and Buitenpost were, by the KNVB, penalized with a 3 and 1 point deduction respectively. The match between both teams was stopped after an uproar among several players of both teams.)	20	8	5	7	39	37	+2	29	
10	RKAV Volendam	21	8	5	8	43	42	+1	29	
11	ASV De Dijk	21	6	3	12	24	40	−16	21	
12	SDC Putten	21	6	3	12	22	40	−18	21	
13	Flevo Boys	21	4	8	9	27	33	−6	20	~~Qualification to relegation play-offs~~
14	DETO Twenterand	21	5	3	13	27	49	−22	18	~~Qualification to relegation play-offs~~
15	Purmersteijn	21	4	2	15	26	56	−30	14	~~Relegation to Eerste Klasse~~
16	Buitenpost	20	3	2	15	17	59	−42	10	~~Relegation to Eerste Klasse~~

Source: Soccerway
Rules for classification: Season in progress: 1) Most points won; 2) Less points lost; 3) Goal difference; 4) Goals scored; 5) Alphabetical order; End of season: 1) Points; 2) Goal difference; 3) Goals scored; 4) Head-to-head points; 5) Head-to-head goal difference; 6) Head-to-head away goals scored; 7) Play-off if relevant for deciding champion, relegation or participating in a European league, otherwise by draw. 8) Penalty shoot-out (only after a play-off)
(P) Promoted

==== Sunday A League ====
Pos	Team	Pld	W	D	L	GF	GA	GD	Pts	Promotion, qualification or relegation
1	Hollandia (Note: Winner of the first period (games 1-10).) (P)	20	13	4	3	42	20	+22	43	Promotion to Derde Divisie
2	JOS Watergraafsmeer (P)	19	12	4	3	47	24	+23	40	~~Qualification to promotion play-offs~~
3	RKAVV	21	10	6	5	53	33	+20	36	~~Qualification to promotion play-offs~~
4	SJC	20	11	2	7	45	31	+14	35	~~Qualification to promotion play-offs~~
5	Alphense Boys	20	11	1	8	43	28	+15	34	
6	Hoogeveen (Note: Hoogeveen and Leonidas were both, by the KNVB, penalized with 1 point deduction. The match between both teams was stopped after tension among their opposing players.)	19	10	3	6	36	31	+5	32	
7	Leonidas	19	8	6	5	38	33	+5	29	
8	HBS Craeyenhout	20	8	5	7	30	26	+4	29	
9	Quick '20	20	7	7	6	52	46	+6	28	Withdrawal from Sunday football
10	Velsen	19	7	5	7	28	30	−2	26	
11	SDO	20	7	5	8	45	44	+1	26	
12	Be Quick 1887	21	6	7	8	32	25	+7	25	
13	VV Emmen	20	4	7	9	41	55	−14	19	~~Qualification to relegation play-offs~~
14	MSC	19	4	2	13	18	67	−49	14	Withdrawal from Sunday football
15	MVV Alcides	20	4	2	14	24	48	−24	14	~~Relegation to Eerste Klasse~~
16	VOC	21	3	2	16	25	58	−33	11	~~Relegation to Eerste Klasse~~

Source: Soccerway
Rules for classification: Season in progress: 1) Most points won; 2) Less points lost; 3) Goal difference; 4) Goals scored; 5) Alphabetical order; End of season: 1) Points; 2) Goal difference; 3) Goals scored; 4) Head-to-head points; 5) Head-to-head goal difference; 6) Head-to-head away goals scored; 7) Play-off if relevant for deciding champion, relegation or participating in a European league, otherwise by draw. 8) Penalty shoot-out (only after a play-off)
(P) Promoted

==== Sunday B League ====
Pos	Team	Pld	W	D	L	GF	GA	GD	Pts	Promotion, qualification or relegation
1	Unitas (Note: Winner of the first period (games 1-10).) (P)	20	14	5	1	35	12	+23	47	Promotion to Derde Divisie
2	Halsteren	20	12	5	3	42	18	+24	41	~~Qualification to promotion play-offs~~
3	IFC	20	11	2	7	46	25	+21	35	~~Qualification to promotion play-offs~~
4	Baronie	20	10	5	5	38	19	+19	35	~~Qualification to promotion play-offs~~
5	RKZVC	20	9	7	4	40	25	+15	34	
6	Juliana '31	20	8	7	5	48	33	+15	31	
7	OJC Rosmalen	20	9	3	8	36	33	+3	30	
8	UDI '19	19	8	5	6	28	22	+6	29	
9	AWC	19	7	4	8	21	32	−11	25	
10	Longa '30	19	7	3	9	32	35	−3	24	
11	Meerssen	19	5	7	7	20	29	−9	22	
12	Silvolde	19	5	5	9	19	28	−9	20	
13	Minor	19	6	1	12	21	46	−25	19	~~Qualification to relegation play-offs~~
14	Moerse Boys	20	4	6	10	29	38	−9	18	~~Qualification to relegation play-offs~~
15	EHC	20	5	1	14	23	49	−26	16	~~Relegation to Eerste Klasse~~
16	Nuenen	20	2	4	14	10	44	−34	10	~~Relegation to Eerste Klasse~~

Source: Soccerway
Rules for classification: Season in progress: 1) Most points won; 2) Less points lost; 3) Goal difference; 4) Goals scored; 5) Alphabetical order; End of season: 1) Points; 2) Goal difference; 3) Goals scored; 4) Head-to-head points; 5) Head-to-head goal difference; 6) Head-to-head away goals scored; 7) Play-off if relevant for deciding champion, relegation or participating in a European league, otherwise by draw. 8) Penalty shoot-out (only after a play-off)
(P) Promoted
