= 2021–22 Hoofdklasse =

Hoofdklasse
- Season: 2021–22

The 2021–22 season of the Hoofdklasse will be played in four leagues, two for Saturday and two for Sunday. The champions of each league will be promoted directly to the Derde Divisie; other teams can get promoted through play-offs. The 2021–22 Hoofdklasse will start on Saturday 28 August 2021.

== Play-offs ==
=== Promotion ===
In each competition teams play periods of 10 games, three times per season (30 games per season). After each period the best team which has not yet qualified earns a spot in the play-offs for the Derde Divisie as the period champion. 6 teams from the Saturday Hoofdklasse play against 2 teams from the Saturday Derde Divisie for 2 promotion spots. The teams from the Sunday leagues do the same.

=== Relegation ===
The teams in place 13 and 14 at the end of the season fight against relegation in the relegation play-offs. They face the period champions of the Eerste Klasse.

== Saturday A ==
=== Teams ===
Location of teams in the Saturday Hoofdklasse A 2020/21
South Holland clubs in the Saturday Hoofdklasse A 2020/21

| Club | Home City | Venue | Capacity |
|---|---|---|---|
| Achilles '29 | Groesbeek | Sportpark De Heikant | 4,500 |
| Achilles Veen | Veen | Sportpark De Hanen Weide | 2,000 |
| ARC | Alphen aan den Rijn | Sportpark Zegersloot | 9,000 |
| Capelle | Capelle aan den IJssel | Sportpark 't Slot | 3,000 |
| DHSC | Utrecht | Sportpark Wesley Sneijder | 2,000 |
| DUNO | Doorwerth | Sportpark De Waayenberg | 1,000 |
| SC Feyenoord | Rotterdam | Varkenoord | 1,400 |
| 's-Gravenzande | 's-Gravenzande | Juliana Sportpark | 3,000 |
| Jodan Boys | Gouda | Sportpark Oosterwei | 1,500 |
| Poortugaal | Poortugaal | Sportpark Polder Albrandswaard | 1,000 |
| Rijnvogels | Katwijk aan den Rijn | Sportpark De Kooltuin | 1,500 |
| Rijsoord | Ridderkerk | Sportpark Rijsoord | 1,800 |
| Smitshoek | Barendrecht | Sportpark Smitshoek | 2,000 |
| Spijkenisse | Spijkenisse | Sportpark Jaap Riedijk | 1,800 |
| Scherpenzeel | Scherpenzeel | Sportpark De Bree-Oost | 1,000 |
| Zwaluwen | Vlaardingen | Sportpark Zwaluwen | 2,750 |

=== Standings ===
| Pos | Team | Pld | W | D | L | GF | GA | GD | Pts | Promotion, qualification or relegation |
|---|---|---|---|---|---|---|---|---|---|---|
| 1 | FC Rijnvogels (C, P) | 30 | 20 | 4 | 6 | 78 | 36 | +42 | 64 | Promotion to Derde Divisie |
| 2 | SC Feyenoord | 30 | 18 | 5 | 7 | 66 | 36 | +30 | 59 | Qualification to promotion play-offs |
| 3 | VV Capelle | 30 | 17 | 8 | 5 | 55 | 27 | +28 | 59 | |
| 4 | SV ARC | 30 | 18 | 2 | 10 | 66 | 34 | +32 | 56 | Qualification to promotion play-offs |
| 5 | Achilles Veen | 30 | 15 | 5 | 10 | 62 | 38 | +24 | 50 | |
| 6 | FC 's-Gravenzande | 30 | 15 | 4 | 11 | 63 | 53 | +10 | 49 | |
| 7 | VV Smitshoek | 30 | 14 | 4 | 12 | 46 | 51 | −5 | 46 | |
| 8 | SV Poortugaal | 30 | 12 | 7 | 11 | 52 | 50 | +2 | 43 | |
| 9 | VV Zwaluwen | 30 | 10 | 11 | 9 | 55 | 45 | +10 | 41 | Qualification to promotion play-offs |
| 10 | CVV de Jodan Boys | 30 | 11 | 6 | 13 | 44 | 42 | +2 | 39 | |
| 11 | DHSC | 30 | 10 | 6 | 14 | 36 | 47 | −11 | 36 | |
| 12 | VV Spijkenisse | 30 | 10 | 6 | 14 | 38 | 53 | −15 | 36 | |
| 13 | VV Scherpenzeel (R) | 30 | 11 | 2 | 17 | 58 | 61 | −3 | 35 | Qualification to relegation play-offs |
| 14 | VV DUNO (R) | 30 | 9 | 8 | 13 | 42 | 49 | −7 | 35 | Qualification to relegation play-offs |
| 15 | Achilles '29 (R) | 30 | 4 | 5 | 21 | 33 | 89 | −56 | 17 | Relegation to Eerste Klasse |
| 16 | VV Rijsoord (R) | 30 | 3 | 3 | 24 | 28 | 111 | −83 | 12 | Relegation to Eerste Klasse |

Source: Hollandsevelden
Rules for classification: Season in progress: 1) Most points won; 2) Less points lost; 3) Goal difference; 4) Goals scored; 5) Alphabetical order; End of season: 1) Points; 2) Goal difference; 3) Goals scored; 4) Head-to-head points; 5) Head-to-head goal difference; 6) Head-to-head away goals scored; 7) Play-off if relevant for deciding champion, relegation or participating in a European league, otherwise by draw. 8) Penalty shoot-out (only after a play-off)
(C) Champions; (P) Promoted; (R) Relegated

=== Fixtures/results ===
| Home \ Away | A29 | ACH | ARC | CAP | DHS | DUN | FEY | GRA | JOD | POO | RVO | RSO | SPZ | SMI | SPI | ZWA |
|---|---|---|---|---|---|---|---|---|---|---|---|---|---|---|---|---|
| Achilles '29 | | 1–6 | 0–2 | 0–3 | 0–3 | 2–1 | 0–3 | 1–1 | 1–1 | 1–2 | 1–4 | 4–1 | 1–3 | 2–4 | 3–1 | 2–2 |
| Achilles Veen | 7–0 | | 1–2 | 1–4 | 3–0 | 3–2 | 2–0 | 2–0 | 2–0 | 2–0 | 2–0 | 2–1 | 0–2 | 1–2 | 0–0 | 1–1 |
| ARC | 5–0 | 1–0 | | 0–0 | 3–1 | 4–2 | 1–4 | 0–2 | 2–0 | 1–2 | 2–3 | 3–1 | 5–2 | 2–0 | 3–1 | 1–0 |
| Capelle | 2–1 | 0–1 | 1–2 | | 3–0 | 0–0 | 3–2 | 2–1 | 3–0 | 3–2 | 0–1 | 1–1 | 4–2 | 1–3 | 1–0 | 0–0 |
| DHSC | 4–2 | 3–2 | 1–0 | 0–2 | | 2–0 | 1–3 | 1–3 | 1–0 | 3–0 | 0–2 | 2–1 | 0–3 | 1–2 | 0–0 | 2–4 |
| DUNO | 4–0 | 1–1 | 0–1 | 1–0 | 2–1 | | 1–3 | 2–4 | 3–1 | 2–2 | 2–1 | 2–1 | 4–1 | 0–1 | 1–2 | 0–0 |
| SC Feyenoord | 1–2 | 2–2 | 3–1 | 1–1 | 0–0 | 3–0 | | 3–1 | 3–0 | 2–3 | 0–1 | 4–0 | 1–2 | 4–0 | 4–1 | 3–2 |
| 's-Gravenzande | 2–2 | 3–1 | 2–1 | 2–3 | 1–1 | 0–1 | 1–2 | | 2–1 | 2–1 | 5–1 | 3–2 | 2–0 | 1–3 | 2–0 | 5–1 |
| Jodan Boys | 3–1 | 2–0 | 0–1 | 1–2 | 4–1 | 3–3 | 1–2 | 1–3 | | 1–1 | 0–1 | 5–0 | 3–0 | 0–0 | 1–1 | 1–1 |
| Poortugaal | 6–1 | 1–3 | 0–6 | 1–1 | 1–1 | 0–0 | 0–1 | 6–1 | 1–3 | | 2–1 | 3–1 | 0–2 | 1–1 | 1–0 | 3–0 |
| Rijnvogels | 2–1 | 2–1 | 3–1 | 2–3 | 0–0 | 1–1 | 3–3 | 2–1 | 3–0 | 5–3 | | 5–1 | 2–1 | 2–3 | 5–1 | 2–0 |
| Rijsoord | 2–0 | 2–6 | 0–12 | 0–6 | 1–1 | 3–2 | 0–1 | 1–4 | 0–1 | 1–4 | 0–10 | | 2–1 | 1–3 | 1–5 | 0–5 |
| Scherpenzeel | 7–1 | 1–4 | 2–0 | 1–1 | 0–1 | 2–3 | 2–2 | 4–3 | 1–2 | 0–1 | 1–3 | 6–0 | | 3–5 | 1–2 | 0–4 |
| Smitshoek | 3–1 | 1–3 | 1–1 | 0–3 | 1–0 | 3–0 | 0–2 | 1–2 | 1–3 | 1–1 | 0–4 | 3–1 | 1–4 | | 0–1 | 0–4 |
| Spijkenisse | 2–0 | 2–1 | 0–3 | 0–1 | 3–2 | 2–0 | 2–3 | 1–1 | 2–3 | 3–1 | 0–6 | 3–3 | 2–1 | 0–3 | | 0–1 |
| Zwaluwen | 2–2 | 2–2 | 2–0 | 1–1 | 1–3 | 2–2 | 3–1 | 6–3 | 0–3 | 1–3 | 1–1 | 4–0 | 2–3 | 2–0 | 1–1 | |

Source: Soccerway
Legend: Blue = home team win; Yellow = draw; Red = away team win.

== Saturday B ==
=== Teams ===
Location of teams in the Saturday Hoofdklasse B 2020/21

| Club | Location | Venue | Capacity |
|---|---|---|---|
| AZSV | Aalten | Sportpark Villekamp | 3,000 |
| Berkum | Zwolle | Sportpark De Vegtlust | 3,000 |
| Buitenpost | Buitenpost | Sportpark De Swadde | 1,500 |
| DETO Twenterand | Vriezenveen | Sportpark 't Midden | 4,000 |
| ASV De Dijk | Amsterdam | Sportpark Schellingwoude | 1,500 |
| Eemdijk | Bunschoten | Sportpark De Vinken | 1,500 |
| Flevo Boys | Emmeloord | Sportpark Ervenbos | 3,250 |
| Genemuiden | Genemuiden | Sportpark De Wetering | 5,900 |
| HZVV | Hoogeveen | Sportvelden Bentinckspark | 5,000 |
| Noordscheschut | Noordscheschut | Sportpark De Meulewieke | 1,000 |
| NSC | Nijkerk | Sportpark De NSC Burcht | 1,800 |
| ONS Sneek | Sneek | Zuidersportpark | 3,150 |
| SDC Putten | Putten | Sportpark Putter Eng | 4,500 |
| Swift | Amsterdam | Sportpark Olympiaplein | 1,500 |
| Urk | Urk | Sportpark De Vormt | 4,500 |
| RKAV Volendam | Volendam | Kwabo Stadion | 6,500 |

=== Standings ===
| Pos | Team | Pld | W | D | L | GF | GA | GD | Pts | Promotion, qualification or relegation |
|---|---|---|---|---|---|---|---|---|---|---|
| 1 | Urk (C, P) | 30 | 20 | 6 | 4 | 65 | 34 | +31 | 66 | Promotion to Derde Divisie |
| 2 | RKAV Volendam (O, P) | 30 | 19 | 5 | 6 | 74 | 43 | +31 | 62 | Qualification to promotion play-offs |
| 3 | Eemdijk | 30 | 18 | 4 | 8 | 70 | 37 | +33 | 58 | Qualification to promotion play-offs |
| 4 | Genemuiden | 30 | 18 | 4 | 8 | 66 | 35 | +31 | 58 | Qualification to promotion play-offs |
| 5 | DETO Twenterand | 30 | 15 | 9 | 6 | 61 | 44 | +17 | 54 | |
| 6 | AZSV | 30 | 14 | 3 | 13 | 45 | 51 | −6 | 45 | |
| 7 | Flevo Boys | 30 | 13 | 3 | 14 | 48 | 52 | −4 | 42 | |
| 8 | HZVV | 30 | 11 | 8 | 11 | 45 | 42 | +3 | 41 | |
| 9 | Berkum | 30 | 10 | 10 | 10 | 40 | 38 | +2 | 40 | |
| 10 | Swift | 30 | 10 | 9 | 11 | 58 | 49 | +9 | 39 | |
| 11 | Buitenpost | 30 | 10 | 6 | 14 | 33 | 44 | −11 | 36 | |
| 12 | ASV De Dijk | 30 | 9 | 7 | 14 | 26 | 36 | −10 | 34 | |
| 13 | SDC Putten (R) | 30 | 9 | 5 | 16 | 38 | 44 | −6 | 32 | Qualification to relegation play-offs |
| 14 | ONS Sneek (R) | 30 | 9 | 2 | 19 | 50 | 83 | −33 | 29 | Qualification to relegation play-offs |
| 15 | NSC (R) | 30 | 5 | 7 | 18 | 26 | 62 | −36 | 22 | Relegation to Eerste Klasse |
| 16 | Noordscheschut (R) | 30 | 4 | 4 | 22 | 25 | 76 | −51 | 16 | Relegation to Eerste Klasse |

Source: Soccerway
Rules for classification: Season in progress: 1) Most points won; 2) Less points lost; 3) Goal difference; 4) Goals scored; 5) Alphabetical order; End of season: 1) Points; 2) Goal difference; 3) Goals scored; 4) Head-to-head points; 5) Head-to-head goal difference; 6) Head-to-head away goals scored; 7) Play-off if relevant for deciding champion, relegation or participating in a European league, otherwise by draw. 8) Penalty shoot-out (only after a play-off)
(C) Champions; (O) Play-off winners; (P) Promoted; (R) Relegated

=== Fixtures/results ===
| Home \ Away | AZS | BER | BUI | DET | DIJ | EEM | FLE | GEN | HZV | NSS | NSC | ONS | SDC | SWI | URK | VOL |
|---|---|---|---|---|---|---|---|---|---|---|---|---|---|---|---|---|
| AZSV | | 3–1 | 2–1 | 2–2 | 2–0 | 1–3 | 2–4 | 0–0 | 0–2 | 2–1 | 4–0 | 2–1 | 0–1 | 1–5 | 3–2 | 3–2 |
| Berkum | 0–0 | | 2–1 | 1–1 | 0–0 | 1–0 | 2–1 | 1–3 | 0–0 | 4–0 | 1–1 | 6–0 | 1–0 | 2–1 | 1–1 | 1–2 |
| Buitenpost | 3–0 | 1–1 | | 1–0 | 0–1 | 2–2 | 1–0 | 1–2 | 1–1 | 2–0 | 2–1 | 3–2 | 1–3 | 0–1 | 0–1 | 0–3 |
| DETO Twenterand | 4–2 | 4–2 | 4–1 | | 1–0 | 3–2 | 2–0 | 1–1 | 2–2 | 3–0 | 3–1 | 2–1 | 1–3 | 1–0 | 1–1 | 2–2 |
| ASV De Dijk | 0–1 | 0–0 | 1–0 | 1–1 | | 1–0 | 1–1 | 2–1 | 0–2 | 0–0 | 0–2 | 2–1 | 2–3 | 1–0 | 0–0 | 0–4 |
| Eemdijk | 4–1 | 1–0 | 1–1 | 1–2 | 3–2 | | 2–3 | 1–0 | 2–1 | 5–1 | 2–0 | 0–2 | 3–1 | 3–3 | 2–2 | 2–0 |
| Flevo Boys | 0–2 | 3–1 | 2–1 | 4–0 | 0–3 | 0–3 | | 2–1 | 3–1 | 2–0 | 3–0 | 2–0 | 1–1 | 1–3 | 2–1 | 1–2 |
| Genemuiden | 3–2 | 2–0 | 4–0 | 3–1 | 1–0 | 3–0 | 2–1 | | 2–0 | 1–0 | 1–1 | 8–1 | 2–1 | 1–1 | 3–5 | 3–5 |
| HZVV | 1–3 | 1–1 | 2–3 | 2–4 | 2–1 | 1–2 | 1–1 | 2–0 | | 5–1 | 2–1 | 2–2 | 3–2 | 3–0 | 1–2 | 0–0 |
| Noordscheschut | 1–3 | 0–1 | 1–3 | 1–1 | 1–2 | 0–5 | 4–1 | 0–7 | 1–3 | | 0–2 | 4–3 | 3–1 | 0–0 | 0–1 | 0–3 |
| NSC | 0–2 | 0–3 | 0–0 | 0–2 | 1–1 | 1–3 | 2–4 | 0–1 | 1–0 | 3–2 | | 1–2 | 2–1 | 1–4 | 2–2 | 0–5 |
| ONS Sneek | 3–0 | 4–1 | 2–3 | 0–4 | 2–0 | 1–9 | 4–2 | 0–4 | 2–3 | 1–2 | 1–1 | | 2–1 | 3–5 | 0–2 | 3–2 |
| SDC Putten | 2–1 | 1–2 | 0–0 | 0–2 | 1–3 | 0–1 | 4–1 | 0–2 | 1–2 | 2–0 | 2–0 | 3–0 | | 0–0 | 0–1 | 0–0 |
| Swift | 0–1 | 1–1 | 0–1 | 4–4 | 2–1 | 1–4 | 1–2 | 2–3 | 0–0 | 5–1 | 4–0 | 5–2 | 2–2 | | 2–3 | 2–2 |
| Urk | 2–0 | 2–1 | 1–0 | 3–2 | 1–0 | 0–3 | 3–0 | 3–1 | 2–0 | 4–0 | 2–2 | 3–1 | 3–0 | 4–0 | | 5–1 |
| RKAV Volendam | 3–0 | 4–2 | 4–0 | 3–1 | 3–1 | 3–1 | 2–1 | 2–1 | 2–0 | 1–1 | 3–0 | 1–4 | 3–2 | 1–4 | 6–3 | |

Source: Soccerway
Legend: Blue = home team win; Yellow = draw; Red = away team win.

== Sunday A ==
=== Teams ===
Location of teams in the Sunday Hoofdklasse A 2020/21

| Club | Location | Venue | Capacity |
|---|---|---|---|
| Alcides | Meppel | Sportpark Ezinge | 5,000 |
| Alphense Boys | Alphen aan den Rijn | Sportpark De Bijlen | 3,200 |
| Be Quick 1887 | Haren | Stadion Esserberg | 12,000 |
| De Zouaven | Grootebroek | Sportpark De Kloet | 2,000 |
| VV Emmen | Emmen | Sportpark De Meerdijk | 1,700 |
| HBS Craeyenhout | The Hague | Sportpark Craeyenhout | 2,600 |
| Hoogeveen | Hoogeveen | Sportvelden Bentinckspark | 5,000 |
| Purmersteijn | Purmerend | Purmersteijn Sportpark | 1,500 |
| RKAVV | Leidschendam | Sportpark Kastelering | 4,500 |
| SDO | Bussum | Sportpark De Kuil | 1,500 |
| SJC | Noordwijk | Gemeentelijk Sportpark SJC | 3,000 |
| TAC '90 | The Hague | Sportpark De Verlichting | 1,000 |
| TOGB | Berkel en Rodenrijs | Sportpark Het Hoge Land | 1,500 |
| Velsen | Velsen | Sportpark Driehuis | 1,000 |
| VOC | Rotterdam | Sportpark Hazelaarweg | 1,000 |

=== Standings ===
| Pos | Team | Pld | W | D | L | GF | GA | GD | Pts | Promotion, qualification or relegation |
|---|---|---|---|---|---|---|---|---|---|---|
| 1 | TOGB (C, P) | 28 | 20 | 2 | 6 | 63 | 36 | +27 | 62 | Promotion to Derde Divisie |
| 2 | HBS Craeyenhout | 28 | 18 | 4 | 6 | 65 | 25 | +40 | 58 | Qualification to promotion play-offs |
| 3 | Hoogeveen | 28 | 17 | 5 | 6 | 77 | 40 | +37 | 56 | Qualification to promotion play-offs |
| 4 | SJC | 28 | 17 | 4 | 7 | 74 | 47 | +27 | 55 | Qualification to promotion play-offs |
| 5 | Be Quick 1887 | 28 | 15 | 7 | 6 | 66 | 29 | +37 | 52 | |
| 6 | RKAVV | 28 | 11 | 11 | 6 | 49 | 41 | +8 | 44 | |
| 7 | Purmersteijn | 28 | 9 | 11 | 8 | 56 | 51 | +5 | 38 | |
| 8 | Alphense Boys | 28 | 11 | 5 | 12 | 57 | 65 | −8 | 38 | |
| 9 | Velsen | 28 | 10 | 4 | 14 | 38 | 46 | −8 | 34 | |
| 10 | VOC | 28 | 9 | 6 | 13 | 45 | 53 | −8 | 33 | |
| 11 | MVV Alcides | 28 | 7 | 8 | 13 | 48 | 68 | −20 | 29 | |
| 12 | De Zouaven | 28 | 7 | 6 | 15 | 46 | 63 | −17 | 27 | |
| 13 | TAC '90 (R) | 28 | 8 | 2 | 18 | 41 | 68 | −27 | 26 | Qualification to relegation play-offs |
| 14 | SDO (R) | 28 | 5 | 3 | 20 | 29 | 80 | −51 | 18 | Qualification to relegation play-offs |
| 15 | VV Emmen (R) | 28 | 3 | 8 | 17 | 26 | 68 | −42 | 17 | Relegation to Eerste Klasse |

Source: Soccerway
Rules for classification: Season in progress: 1) Most points won; 2) Less points lost; 3) Goal difference; 4) Goals scored; 5) Alphabetical order; End of season: 1) Points; 2) Goal difference; 3) Goals scored; 4) Head-to-head points; 5) Head-to-head goal difference; 6) Head-to-head away goals scored; 7) Play-off if relevant for deciding champion, relegation or participating in a European league, otherwise by draw. 8) Penalty shoot-out (only after a play-off)
(C) Champions; (P) Promoted; (R) Relegated

=== Fixtures/results ===
| Home \ Away | ALC | ALP | BEQ | EMM | HBS | HOO | PUR | RKA | SDO | SJC | TAC | TOG | VEL | VOC | ZOU |
|---|---|---|---|---|---|---|---|---|---|---|---|---|---|---|---|
| MVV Alcides | | 5–2 | 0–3 | 1–1 | 0–3 | 1–5 | 2–2 | 2–4 | 6–1 | 0–4 | 6–3 | 0–2 | 0–2 | 2–1 | 1–2 |
| Alphense Boys | 1–3 | | 0–9 | 7–0 | 1–2 | 2–2 | 0–1 | 2–1 | 1–2 | 0–3 | 2–2 | 1–3 | 3–2 | 5–1 | 2–1 |
| Be Quick 1887 | 1–1 | 4–0 | | 6–3 | 2–2 | 5–0 | 0–0 | 0–1 | 4–1 | 1–2 | 1–3 | 3–0 | 1–3 | 1–0 | 4–0 |
| VV Emmen | 1–1 | 2–5 | 1–4 | | 1–2 | 0–3 | 0–1 | 0–1 | 1–1 | 1–4 | 1–2 | 2–1 | 2–1 | 2–1 | 1–1 |
| HBS Craeyenhout | 6–1 | 6–1 | 1–2 | 3–0 | | 3–0 | 1–1 | 1–0 | 4–0 | 1–2 | 1–0 | 1–2 | 5–1 | 4–0 | 4–1 |
| Hoogeveen | 2–2 | 1–4 | 3–1 | 0–0 | 2–0 | | 3–1 | 0–1 | 6–2 | 3–1 | 7–1 | 2–3 | 3–0 | 6–0 | 2–2 |
| Purmersteijn | 1–3 | 2–4 | 1–1 | 1–0 | 2–2 | 2–2 | | 3–3 | 8–1 | 0–2 | 3–1 | 2–4 | 3–1 | 1–1 | 4–1 |
| RKAVV | 1–1 | 2–1 | 0–0 | 4–2 | 1–1 | 3–4 | 3–3 | | 1–0 | 2–2 | 2–1 | 1–1 | 0–2 | 2–2 | 3–0 |
| SDO | 2–1 | 1–1 | 0–2 | 1–0 | 2–4 | 0–6 | 3–4 | 1–1 | | 0–5 | 3–1 | 0–2 | 0–4 | 1–2 | 0–1 |
| SJC | 1–1 | 3–1 | 1–1 | 8–1 | 1–0 | 2–6 | 2–0 | 4–2 | 6–2 | | 2–1 | 2–6 | 3–4 | 2–1 | 7–2 |
| TAC '90 | 1–2 | 2–3 | 0–2 | 3–1 | 0–4 | 0–1 | 3–6 | 2–4 | 1–0 | 2–1 | | 0–2 | 3–1 | 2–0 | 5–3 |
| TOGB | 3–2 | 0–2 | 4–2 | 3–0 | 1–0 | 3–2 | 1–0 | 2–2 | 2–0 | 0–1 | 2–1 | | 5–0 | 3–1 | 3–2 |
| Velsen | 4–1 | 2–3 | 0–0 | 0–0 | 0–1 | 0–2 | 0–0 | 2–0 | 0–2 | 2–0 | 1–1 | 2–1 | | 2–4 | 1–2 |
| VOC | 2–2 | 2–2 | 1–4 | 1–1 | 1–2 | 0–2 | 5–1 | 0–0 | 2–1 | 5–1 | 3–0 | 5–1 | 1–0 | | 2–0 |
| De Zouaven | 7–1 | 1–1 | 1–2 | 2–2 | 0–1 | 0–2 | 2–2 | 2–4 | 4–2 | 2–2 | 4–0 | 0–3 | 0–1 | 3–1 | |

Source: Soccerway
Legend: Blue = home team win; Yellow = draw; Red = away team win.

== Sunday B ==
=== Teams ===
Location of teams in the Sunday Hoofdklasse B 2020/21

| Club | Location | Venue | Capacity |
|---|---|---|---|
| AWC | Wijchen | Sportpark De Wijchert | 2,000 |
| Baronie | Breda | Sportpark Blauwe Kei | 7,000 |
| Halsteren | Halsteren | Sportpark De Beek | 1,800 |
| Juliana '31 | Malden | Sportpark De Broeklanden | 1,500 |
| Longa '30 | Lichtenvoorde | Sportpark De Treffer | 2,300 |
| Meerssen | Meerssen | Sportpark Marsana | 2,000 |
| Minor | Nuth | Sportpark De Kollenberg | 1,500 |
| Moerse Boys | Zundert | Sportpark De Akkermolen | 1,500 |
| Nuenen | Nuenen | Sportpark Oude Landen | 1,800 |
| RKZVC | Zieuwent | Sportpark De Greune Weide | 1,500 |
| OJC Rosmalen | Rosmalen | Sportpark De Groote Wielen | 3,000 |
| Orion | Nijmegen | Sportpark Mariënbosch | 1,500 |
| Silvolde | Silvolde | Sportpark De Munsterman | 1,500 |
| UDI '19 | Uden | Sportpark Parkzicht | 5,000 |

=== Standings ===
| Pos | Team | Pld | W | D | L | GF | GA | GD | Pts | Promotion, qualification or relegation |
|---|---|---|---|---|---|---|---|---|---|---|
| 1 | Baronie (C, P) | 26 | 19 | 3 | 4 | 53 | 21 | +32 | 60 | Promotion to Derde Divisie |
| 2 | OJC Rosmalen (O, P) | 26 | 17 | 3 | 6 | 60 | 33 | +27 | 52 | Qualification to promotion play-offs |
| 3 | UDI '19 (O, P) | 26 | 15 | 4 | 7 | 41 | 29 | +12 | 49 | Qualification to promotion play-offs |
| 4 | Orion | 26 | 15 | 2 | 9 | 51 | 35 | +16 | 47 | Qualification to promotion play-offs |
| 5 | Halsteren | 26 | 12 | 8 | 6 | 48 | 39 | +9 | 44 | |
| 6 | Juliana '31 | 26 | 12 | 5 | 9 | 45 | 38 | +7 | 41 | |
| 7 | Nuenen | 26 | 11 | 4 | 11 | 36 | 31 | +5 | 37 | |
| 8 | AWC | 26 | 10 | 3 | 13 | 49 | 50 | −1 | 33 | |
| 9 | Meerssen | 26 | 9 | 6 | 11 | 40 | 45 | −5 | 33 | |
| 10 | Silvolde | 26 | 9 | 5 | 12 | 38 | 30 | +8 | 32 | |
| 11 | RKZVC | 26 | 7 | 6 | 13 | 25 | 44 | −19 | 27 | |
| 12 | Moerse Boys | 26 | 6 | 7 | 13 | 29 | 53 | −24 | 22 | |
| 13 | Longa '30 (O) | 26 | 5 | 4 | 17 | 33 | 59 | −26 | 19 | Qualification to relegation play-offs |
| 14 | Minor (R) | 26 | 4 | 2 | 20 | 27 | 68 | −41 | 14 | Qualification to relegation play-offs |

Source: Soccerway
Rules for classification: Season in progress: 1) Most points won; 2) Less points lost; 3) Goal difference; 4) Goals scored; 5) Alphabetical order; End of season: 1) Points; 2) Goal difference; 3) Goals scored; 4) Head-to-head points; 5) Head-to-head goal difference; 6) Head-to-head away goals scored; 7) Play-off if relevant for deciding champion, relegation or participating in a European league, otherwise by draw. 8) Penalty shoot-out (only after a play-off)
(C) Champions; (O) Play-off winners; (P) Promoted; (R) Relegated

=== Fixtures/results ===
| Home \ Away | AWC | BAR | HAL | JUL | LON | MRS | MIN | MOE | NUE | OJC | ORI | RKZ | SIL | UDI |
|---|---|---|---|---|---|---|---|---|---|---|---|---|---|---|
| AWC | | 1–0 | 4–1 | 1–4 | 2–5 | 1–2 | 4–0 | 4–3 | 1–1 | 5–1 | 3–1 | 2–2 | 1–0 | 2–1 |
| Baronie | 1–0 | | 3–1 | 1–0 | 4–1 | 5–0 | 2–1 | 2–0 | 1–2 | 3–1 | 1–0 | 4–1 | 1–0 | 2–2 |
| Halsteren | 3–2 | 2–1 | | 1–3 | 1–1 | 3–3 | 5–2 | 3–0 | 0–0 | 1–2 | 3–0 | 0–0 | 1–0 | 2–1 |
| Juliana '31 | 2–1 | 1–3 | 0–0 | | 2–2 | 3–0 | 1–0 | 4–1 | 2–0 | 3–3 | 1–3 | 4–1 | 0–1 | 0–1 |
| Longa '30 | 0–3 | 1–2 | 2–3 | 1–4 | | 1–3 | 1–0 | 3–1 | 0–3 | 1–2 | 1–3 | 0–1 | 0–3 | 0–2 |
| Meerssen | 3–1 | 0–2 | 2–2 | 2–2 | 2–3 | | 2–0 | 5–0 | 0–2 | 1–3 | 3–2 | 0–0 | 2–1 | 0–0 |
| Minor | 0–3 | 0–1 | 1–2 | 1–2 | 2–2 | 2–1 | | 1–4 | 3–1 | 0–5 | 1–4 | 5–2 | 1–5 | 1–2 |
| Moerse Boys | 2–2 | 2–2 | 0–1 | 1–1 | 2–1 | 0–2 | 2–1 | | 0–4 | 0–0 | 2–1 | 4–2 | 0–0 | 0–0 |
| Nuenen | 3–2 | 0–3 | 1–1 | 1–2 | 2–0 | 2–1 | 0–1 | 5–1 | | 0–2 | 0–2 | 2–0 | 2–2 | 1–2 |
| OJC Rosmalen | 4–2 | 1–0 | 5–2 | 4–0 | 5–4 | 3–1 | 5–0 | 4–0 | 0–1 | | 1–2 | 2–0 | 2–0 | 1–2 |
| Orion | 3–1 | 1–3 | 3–3 | 2–0 | 3–0 | 3–1 | 4–2 | 2–1 | 1–0 | 3–0 | | 0–1 | 0–3 | 4–0 |
| RKZVC | 3–0 | 0–2 | 0–3 | 1–3 | 1–1 | 2–0 | 2–1 | 0–0 | 2–1 | 0–0 | 2–0 | | 1–4 | 1–2 |
| Silvolde | 3–0 | 2–3 | 1–3 | 3–0 | 0–1 | 1–1 | 1–1 | 3–1 | 1–2 | 2–3 | 0–0 | 2–0 | | 0–2 |
| UDI '19 | 2–1 | 1–1 | 2–1 | 3–1 | 3–1 | 1–3 | 5–0 | 0–2 | 1–0 | 0–1 | 2–4 | 2–0 | 2–0 | |

Source: Soccerway
Legend: Blue = home team win; Yellow = draw; Red = away team win.
