= 2019–20 Hoofdklasse =

Hoofdklasse
- Season: 2019–20
- Champions: No champions.
- Promoted: Sat A: Sportlust '46; Sat B: Staphorst; ACV; Sun A: Hollandia; JOS Watergraafsmeer; Sun B: Unitas
- Relegated: No team relegated.

The 2019–20 season of the Hoofdklasse was played in four leagues, two Saturday leagues and two Sunday leagues. The champions of each league were to be promoted directly to the 2020–21 Derde Divisie; other teams could have been promoted through playoffs. The exact division of the 2019–20 Hoofdklasse competitions was published on 1 July 2019. The 2019–20 Hoofdklasse started on Saturday 31 August 2019.

== Effects of the 2020 coronavirus pandemic ==
On 12 March 2020, all football leagues were suspended until 31 March as the Dutch government forbade events due to the COVID-19 pandemic in the Netherlands. On 15 March this period was extended until 6 April. Due to the decision of the Dutch government to forbid all gatherings and events until 1 June, this period was even further extended.

Eventually, on 31 March, the KNVB decided not to resume competitions at the amateur level. They also decided, for those competitions involved, there would be no final standings, and therefore no champions, initially no promotions and no relegations. Most teams had to start next season at the same level as they did this season.

Later on 12 June, the KNVB officially announced that the Derde Divisie would again consist of 36 teams from next season. This was one wish of CVTD, the interest group of football clubs from the Tweede and Derde Divisies. After the loss of the two reserve teams, the withdrawal of FC Lienden and the voluntary relegation of ONS Sneek, the two divisions of the third tier would have consisted of only 15 clubs each. To accommodate all group leaders in the Hoofdklasse, the KNVB decided to make each Derde Divisie group have 18 teams. The Hoofdklasse group leaders, namely Sportlust '46, Staphorst, Hollandia and Unitas, therefore moved up to the Derde Divisie. The best runners-up of the Saturday and Sunday Hoofdklasse, ACV and JOS Watergraafsmeer respectively, were also allowed to be promoted.

Meppeler Sport Club and Quick '20 gave up playing Sunday football to compete only on Saturdays after this season.

== Play-offs ==
=== Promotion ===
In each competition teams play periods of 10 games, three times per season (30 games per season). After each period the best team which has not yet qualified earns a spot in the play-offs for the Derde Divisie as the period champion. 6 teams from the Saturday Hoofdklasse play against 2 teams from the Saturday Derde Divisie for 2 promotion spots. The teams from the Sunday leagues do the same.

=== Relegation ===
The teams in place 13 and 14 at the end of the season fight against relegation in the relegation play-offs. They face the period champions of the Eerste Klasse.

== Saturday A ==
=== Teams ===
Location of teams in the Saturday Hoofdklasse A 2019/20
South Holland clubs in the Saturday Hoofdklasse A 2019/20

Club	Home City	Venue	Capacity
Achilles '29	Groesbeek	Sportpark De Heikant	4,500
Achilles Veen	Veen	Sportpark De Hanen Weide	2,000
ARC	Alphen aan den Rijn	Sportpark Zegersloot	9,000
AZSV	Aalten	Sportpark Villekamp	3,000
Capelle	Capelle aan den IJssel	Sportpark 't Slot	3,000
DHSC	Utrecht	Sportpark Wesley Sneijder	2,000
DUNO	Doorwerth	Sportpark De Waayenberg	1,000
SC Feyenoord	Rotterdam	Varkenoord	1,400
's-Gravenzande	's-Gravenzande	Juliana Sportpark	3,000
Jodan Boys	Gouda	Sportpark Oosterwei	1,500
Rijnvogels	Katwijk aan den Rijn	Sportpark De Kooltuin	1,500
Rijsoord	Ridderkerk	Sportpark Rijsoord	1,800
Smitshoek	Barendrecht	Sportpark Smitshoek	2,000
Spijkenisse	Spijkenisse	Sportpark Jaap Riedijk	1,800
Sportlust '46	Woerden	Sportpark Cromwijck	2,000
Zwaluwen	Vlaardingen	Sportpark Zwaluwen	2,750

>> Competition cancelled, what's listed below is the situation on 7 March 2020, the date the last matches were played.<<

=== Standings ===
Pos	Team	Pld	W	D	L	GF	GA	GD	Pts	Promotion, qualification or relegation
1	Sportlust '46 (P)	21	13	3	5	46	21	+25	42	Promotion to Derde Divisie
2	DHSC	21	13	2	6	44	26	+18	41	~~Qualification to promotion play-offs~~
3	SC Feyenoord (Note: Winner of the second period (games 11–30).)	21	11	5	5	55	29	+26	38	~~Qualification to promotion play-offs~~
4	Achilles Veen	21	11	3	7	49	25	+24	36	
5	AZSV (Note: Winner of the first period (games 1–10).)	20	10	4	6	32	23	+9	34	~~Qualification to promotion play-offs~~
6	Smitshoek	21	9	6	6	31	33	−2	33	
7	Rijnvogels	21	9	3	9	32	29	+3	30	
8	ARC	21	8	6	7	29	28	+1	30	
9	Jodan Boys	21	8	6	7	28	29	−1	30	
10	Capelle	21	8	5	8	35	30	+5	29	
11	Spijkenisse	21	8	4	9	34	33	+1	28	
12	Zwaluwen	20	7	5	8	31	35	−4	26	
13	DUNO	20	7	4	9	30	33	−3	25	~~Qualification to relegation play-offs~~
14	Rijsoord	21	6	4	11	22	46	−24	22	~~Qualification to relegation play-offs~~
15	's-Gravenzande	21	4	7	10	24	37	−13	19	~~Relegation to Eerste Klasse~~
16	Achilles '29	20	0	1	19	12	77	−65	1	~~Relegation to Eerste Klasse~~

Source: Soccerway
Rules for classification: Season in progress: 1) Most points won; 2) Less points lost; 3) Goal difference; 4) Goals scored; 5) Alphabetical order; End of season: 1) Points; 2) Goal difference; 3) Goals scored; 4) Head-to-head points; 5) Head-to-head goal difference; 6) Head-to-head away goals scored; 7) Play-off if relevant for deciding champion, relegation or participating in a European league, otherwise by draw. 8) Penalty shoot-out (only after a play-off)
(P) Promoted

=== Fixtures/results ===
Home \ Away	A29	ACH	ARC	AZS	CAP	DHS	DUN	FEY	GRA	JOD	RVO	RSO	SMI	SPI	SPO	ZWA
Achilles '29		0–5	~~23 May~~	~~28 Mar~~	1–4	2–3	~~9 May~~	1–6	~~18 Apr~~	1–2	1–4	0–2	0–4	0–0	0–3	~~21 Mar~~
Achilles Veen	7–0		0–0	0–1	1–2	1–0	5–2	~~18 Apr~~	~~23 May~~	2–1	1–0	7–0	2–0	~~21 Mar~~	~~9 May~~	4–0
ARC	2–0	2–3		~~18 Apr~~	1–1	0–3	5–0	~~4 Apr~~	0–0	2–1	3–2	~~9 May~~	1–1	1–2	0–1	~~16 May~~
AZSV	~~25 Apr~~	~~16 May~~	1–1		1–2	~~4 Apr~~	2–0	~~14 Mar~~	3–1	1–2	1–3	4–0	~~11 Apr~~	3–2	1–0	1–1
Capelle	3–0	~~25 Apr~~	1–2	2–0		2–1	~~21 Mar~~	1–2	3–3	2–2	~~11 Apr~~	1–2	1–3	~~16 May~~	1–0	2–0
DHSC	2–1	2–1	2–1	1–1	~~9 May~~		~~23 May~~	2–2	3–0	~~18 Apr~~	1–2	4–0	~~21 Mar~~	5–3	2–1	1–0
DUNO	5–0	5–2	~~14 Mar~~	0–2	1–1	1–2		3–2	1–0	~~4 Apr~~	1–3	2–0	~~25 Apr~~	~~11 Apr~~	~~16 May~~	~~28 Mar~~
SC Feyenoord	~~11 Apr~~	2–1	6–0	0–2	2–1	4–2	1–1		5–1	3–1	3–0	~~21 Mar~~	~~16 May~~	3–0	2–2	~~25 Apr~~
's-Gravenzande	5–0	1–1	~~11 Apr~~	~~21 Mar~~	2–1	~~16 May~~	1–1	~~9 May~~		2–0	0–1	3–1	0–2	1–1	0–4	1–1
Jodan Boys	~~16 May~~	2–2	~~21 Mar~~	1–2	0–0	1–0	1–2	2–0	~~25 Apr~~		1–1	2–1	1–1	1–0	4–1	~~11 Apr~~
Rijnvogels	~~4 Apr~~	~~14 Mar~~	0–0	1–2	2–1	1–2	~~18 Apr~~	~~23 May~~	3–2	1–2		3–1	1–1	~~25 Apr~~	1–2	2–1
Rijsoord	4–1	~~11 Apr~~	2–4	1–0	~~4 Apr~~	~~25 Apr~~	1–0	2–2	0–0	~~14 Mar~~	~~16 May~~		1–0	0–3	1–1	2–2
Smitshoek	~~14 Mar~~	1–0	2–0	2–2	~~23 May~~	0–5	1–0	1–8	3–0	1–1	~~9 May~~	~~18 Apr~~		0–3	~~4 Apr~~	3–0
Spijkenisse	8–0	1–3	0–3	~~23 May~~	4–3	~~14 Mar~~	1–1	0–0	~~4 Apr~~	~~9 May~~	1–0	2–1	0–1		~~18 Apr~~	0–1
Sportlust '46	3–1	3–1	~~25 Apr~~	3–2	~~14 Mar~~	~~11 Apr~~	0–2	3–0	3–1	~~23 May~~	~~21 Mar~~	5–0	4–1	4–0		2–0
Zwaluwen	5–3	~~4 Apr~~	0–1	~~9 May~~	~~18 Apr~~	2–1	3–2	3–2	~~14 Mar~~	4–0	2–1	~~23 May~~	3–3	2–3	1–1	

Source: Soccerway
Legend: Blue = home team win; Yellow = draw; Red = away team win.

== Saturday B ==
=== Teams ===
Location of teams in the Saturday Hoofdklasse B 2019/20

Club	Location	Venue	Capacity
ACV	Assen	Catawiki Sportpark	5,000
Berkum	Zwolle	Sportpark De Vegtlust	3,000
Buitenpost	Buitenpost	Sportpark De Swadde	1,500
DETO Twenterand	Vriezenveen	Sportpark 't Midden	4,000
ASV De Dijk	Amsterdam	Sportpark Schellingwoude	1,500
Eemdijk	Bunschoten	Sportpark De Vinken	1,500
Flevo Boys	Emmeloord	Sportpark Ervenbos	3,250
Genemuiden	Genemuiden	Sportpark De Wetering	5,900
HZVV	Hoogeveen	Sportvelden Bentinckspark	5,000
NSC	Nijkerk	Sportpark De NSC Burcht	1,800
Purmersteijn	Purmerend	Sportpark Purmersteijn	1,500
SDC Putten	Putten	Sportpark Putter Eng	4,500
Staphorst	Staphorst	Sportpark Het Noorderslag	3,500
Swift	Amsterdam	Sportpark Olympiaplein	1,500
Urk	Urk	Sportpark De Vormt	4,500
RKAV Volendam	Volendam	Kwabo Stadion	6,500

>> Competition cancelled, what's listed below is the situation on 7 March 2020, the date the last matches were played.<<

=== Standings ===
Pos	Team	Pld	W	D	L	GF	GA	GD	Pts	Promotion, qualification or relegation
1	Staphorst (Note: Winner of the second period (games 11-30).) (P)	21	15	2	4	62	19	+43	47	Promotion to Derde Divisie
2	ACV (P)	21	12	6	3	46	32	+14	42	~~Qualification to promotion play-offs~~
3	Eemdijk (Note: Winner of the first period (games 1-10).)	21	12	5	4	28	15	+13	41	~~Qualification to promotion play-offs~~
4	Swift	21	11	6	4	37	26	+11	39	~~Qualification to promotion play-offs~~
5	HZVV	21	12	2	7	41	28	+13	38	
6	Genemuiden	21	11	4	6	45	23	+22	37	
7	Urk	21	9	4	8	34	25	+9	31	
8	Berkum	21	9	4	8	37	31	+6	31	
9	NSC (Note: NSC and Buitenpost were, by the KNVB, penalized with a 3 and 1 point deduction respectively. The match between both teams was stopped after an uproar among several players of both teams.)	20	8	5	7	39	37	+2	29	
10	RKAV Volendam	21	8	5	8	43	42	+1	29	
11	ASV De Dijk	21	6	3	12	24	40	−16	21	
12	SDC Putten	21	6	3	12	22	40	−18	21	
13	Flevo Boys	21	4	8	9	27	33	−6	20	~~Qualification to relegation play-offs~~
14	DETO Twenterand	21	5	3	13	27	49	−22	18	~~Qualification to relegation play-offs~~
15	Purmersteijn	21	4	2	15	26	56	−30	14	~~Relegation to Eerste Klasse~~
16	Buitenpost	20	3	2	15	17	59	−42	10	~~Relegation to Eerste Klasse~~

Source: Soccerway
Rules for classification: Season in progress: 1) Most points won; 2) Less points lost; 3) Goal difference; 4) Goals scored; 5) Alphabetical order; End of season: 1) Points; 2) Goal difference; 3) Goals scored; 4) Head-to-head points; 5) Head-to-head goal difference; 6) Head-to-head away goals scored; 7) Play-off if relevant for deciding champion, relegation or participating in a European league, otherwise by draw. 8) Penalty shoot-out (only after a play-off)
(P) Promoted

=== Fixtures/results ===
Home \ Away	ACV	BER	BUI	DIJ	DET	EEM	FLE	GEN	HZV	NSC	PUR	SDC	STA	SWI	URK	VOL
ACV		1–1	1–1	~~16 May~~	4–2	0–1	4–2	~~14 Mar~~	2–0	4–3	2–0	1–1	~~25 Apr~~	~~11 Apr~~	2–0	~~4 Apr~~
Berkum	0–2		5–0	1–2	~~21 Mar~~	1–3	~~11 Apr~~	1–0	1–3	2–2	3–1	~~25 Apr~~	~~16 May~~	2–2	0–1	2–3
Buitenpost	2–4	0–1		~~14 Mar~~	3–1	2–3	0–2	~~23 May~~	~~18 Apr~~	~~25 Apr~~	0–3	1–0	~~4 Apr~~	0–2	0–8	2–5
ASV De Dijk	1–3	2–1	1–1		3–1	~~9 May~~	1–5	~~18 Apr~~	2–1	~~21 Mar~~	4–0	~~23 May~~	1–6	1–4	0–2	1–1
DETO Twenterand	~~18 Apr~~	1–1	2–4	1–0		0–1	~~16 May~~	~~4 Apr~~	0–2	1–0	~~9 May~~	3–2	2–5	0–1	3–1	1–4
Eemdijk	0–1	~~23 May~~	~~21 Mar~~	1–0	~~25 Apr~~		1–0	0–0	3–0	0–0	2–0	3–2	2–0	1–1	~~14 Mar~~	~~11 Apr~~
Flevo Boys	~~9 May~~	2–3	4–0	~~4 Apr~~	2–2	0–0		3–1	1–1	1–1	~~23 May~~	~~14 Mar~~	0–4	0–0	~~18 Apr~~	0–1
Genemuiden	2–2	0–3	3–0	1–0	1–1	2–0	~~25 Apr~~		2–3	7–1	~~21 Mar~~	6–1	~~11 Apr~~	~~16 May~~	2–0	3–1
HZVV	2–1	~~4 Apr~~	3–0	3–2	~~14 Mar~~	~~16 May~~	1–1	2–3		~~11 Apr~~	3–0	1–2	0–2	~~25 Apr~~	1–0	4–2
NSC	~~23 May~~	~~9 May~~		3–0	6–1	~~18 Apr~~	2–0	0–3	0–3		2–0	~~4 Apr~~	0–1	5–0	4–2	~~14 Mar~~
Purmersteijn	2–3	~~14 Mar~~	~~16 May~~	~~11 Apr~~	4–0	0–3	4–0	0–2	2–1	2–3		0–2	2–8	1–3	~~4 Apr~~	~~25 Apr~~
SDC Putten	~~21 Mar~~	1–2	3–0	0–1	~~11 Apr~~	1–0	3–1	~~9 May~~	0–4	1–1	2–2		0–3	0–2	1–0	~~16 May~~
Staphorst	4–0	2–5	3–0	2–0	~~23 May~~	3–0	~~21 Mar~~	2–1	~~9 May~~	6–0	6–0	~~18 Apr~~		0–3	0–0	3–0
Swift	4–4	1–2	~~9 May~~	1–0	3–2	~~4 Apr~~	1–1	1–0	2–3	2–2	~~18 Apr~~	3–0	~~14 Mar~~		~~23 May~~	1–0
Urk	2–2	2–0	~~11 Apr~~	~~25 Apr~~	1–0	2–4	0–0	1–1	~~21 Mar~~	~~16 May~~	4–0	3–0	2–1	2–0		1–4
RKAV Volendam	2–3	~~18 Apr~~	5–1	2–2	1–3	0–0	3–2	1–5	~~23 May~~	1–4	3–3	3–0	1–1	~~21 Mar~~	~~9 May~~	

Source: Soccerway
Legend: Blue = home team win; Yellow = draw; Red = away team win.

== Sunday A ==
=== Teams ===
Location of teams in the Sunday Hoofdklasse A 2019/20

Club	Location	Venue	Capacity
Alcides	Meppel	Sportpark Ezinge	5,000
Alphense Boys	Alphen aan den Rijn	Sportpark De Bijlen	3,200
Be Quick 1887	Haren	Stadion Esserberg	12,000
VV Emmen	Emmen	Sportpark De Meerdijk	1,700
HBS Craeyenhout	Den Haag	Sportpark Craeyenhout	2,600
Hollandia	Hoorn	Juliana Sportpark	4,000
Hoogeveen	Hoogeveen	Sportvelden Bentinckspark	5,000
JOS Watergraafsmeer	Amsterdam	Sportpark Drieburg	1,000
Leonidas	Rotterdam	Sportpark Leonidas	3,000
MSC	Meppel	Sportpark Ezinge	2,500
Quick '20	Oldenzaal	Sportpark De Vondersweijde	6,400
RKAVV	Leidschendam	Sportpark Kastelering	4,500
SDO	Bussum	Sportpark De Kuil	1,500
SJC	Noordwijk	Gemeentelijk Sportpark SJC	3,000
Velsen	Velsen	Sportpark Driehuis	1,000
VOC	Rotterdam	Sportpark Hazelaarweg	1,000

>> Competition cancelled, what is listed below is the situation on 8 March 2020, the date the last matches were played.<<

=== Standings ===
Pos	Team	Pld	W	D	L	GF	GA	GD	Pts	Promotion, qualification or relegation
1	Hollandia (Note: Winner of the first period (games 1-10).) (P)	20	13	4	3	42	20	+22	43	Promotion to Derde Divisie
2	JOS Watergraafsmeer (P)	19	12	4	3	47	24	+23	40	~~Qualification to promotion play-offs~~
3	RKAVV	21	10	6	5	53	33	+20	36	~~Qualification to promotion play-offs~~
4	SJC	20	11	2	7	45	31	+14	35	~~Qualification to promotion play-offs~~
5	Alphense Boys	20	11	1	8	43	28	+15	34	
6	Hoogeveen (Note: Hoogeveen and Leonidas were both, by the KNVB, penalized with 1 point deduction. The match between both teams was stopped after tension among their opposing players.)	19	10	3	6	36	31	+5	32	
7	Leonidas	19	8	6	5	38	33	+5	29	
8	HBS Craeyenhout	20	8	5	7	30	26	+4	29	
9	Quick '20	20	7	7	6	52	46	+6	28	Withdrawal from Sunday football
10	Velsen	19	7	5	7	28	30	−2	26	
11	SDO	20	7	5	8	45	44	+1	26	
12	Be Quick 1887	21	6	7	8	32	25	+7	25	
13	VV Emmen	20	4	7	9	41	55	−14	19	~~Qualification to relegation play-offs~~
14	MSC	19	4	2	13	18	67	−49	14	Withdrawal from Sunday football
15	MVV Alcides	20	4	2	14	24	48	−24	14	~~Relegation to Eerste Klasse~~
16	VOC	21	3	2	16	25	58	−33	11	~~Relegation to Eerste Klasse~~

Source: Soccerway
Rules for classification: Season in progress: 1) Most points won; 2) Less points lost; 3) Goal difference; 4) Goals scored; 5) Alphabetical order; End of season: 1) Points; 2) Goal difference; 3) Goals scored; 4) Head-to-head points; 5) Head-to-head goal difference; 6) Head-to-head away goals scored; 7) Play-off if relevant for deciding champion, relegation or participating in a European league, otherwise by draw. 8) Penalty shoot-out (only after a play-off)
(P) Promoted

=== Fixtures/results ===
Home \ Away	ALC	ALP	BEQ	EMM	HBS	HOL	HOO	JOS	LEO	MSC	Q20	RKA	SDO	SJC	VEL	VOC
MVV Alcides		~~11 Apr~~	1–5	0–0	~~10 May~~	0–3	0–3	~~17 May~~	1–2	3–0	2–2	0–5	~~22 Mar~~	0–1	3–0	3–2
Alphense Boys	4–2		2–0	4–1	~~5 Apr~~	0–2	3–0	0–2	2–1	8–1	~~17 May~~	2–0	~~19 Apr~~	2–0	~~10 May~~	1–3
Be Quick 1887	~~5 Apr~~	2–1		~~10 May~~	3–0	0–1	1–2	~~15 Mar~~	0–2	5–0	1–1	0–0	~~24 May~~	~~19 Apr~~	1–1	3–0
VV Emmen	~~26 Apr~~	~~21 Mar~~	1–0		0–4	1–2	1–1	1–1	2–2	0–2	~~11 Apr~~	1–1	6–6	2–5	3–4	~~17 May~~
HBS Craeyenhout	0–1	1–2	0–0	5–3		1–1	~~17 May~~	0–1	1–1	4–1	~~26 Apr~~	3–0	0–3	1–0	~~22 Mar~~	~~11 Apr~~
Hollandia	3–2	3–0	~~17 May~~	~~29 Mar~~	0–1		3–0	4–4	~~22 Mar~~	~~11 Apr~~	2–1	~~26 Apr~~	3–1	4–2	2–3	2–0
Hoogeveen	2–1	1–3	0–4	3–2	2–0	~~24 May~~		3–0	~~3 May~~	~~10 May~~	~~29 Mar~~	2–2	3–1	~~5 Apr~~	~~19 Apr~~	~~15 Mar~~
JOS Watergraafsmeer	3–0	~~29 Mar~~	3–2	~~19 Apr~~	~~13 Apr~~	~~10 May~~	~~22 Mar~~		~~24 May~~	6–0	6–1	2–1	2–2	3–1	4–1	3–1
Leonidas	3–2	~~15 Mar~~	~~11 Apr~~	~~5 Apr~~	1–1	2–2	~~26 Apr~~	1–3		6–1	2–2	4–2	5–2	~~17 May~~	~~13 Apr~~	2–1
MSC	~~13 Apr~~	2–1	~~26 Apr~~	0–3	~~24 May~~	0–0	0–3	1–0	~~19 Apr~~		1–6	~~15 Mar~~	~~29 Mar~~	0–4	2–1	~~5 Apr~~
Quick '20	~~14 Mar~~	3–2	4–0	3–4	4–1	~~18 Apr~~	5–4	1–2	1–1	2–2		~~5 Apr~~	~~10 May~~	2–2	~~24 May~~	5–2
RKAVV	~~24 May~~	2–2	~~22 Mar~~	8–5	~~19 Apr~~	0–3	4–1	1–1	3–1	7–3	4–1		4–0	~~10 May~~	2–1	4–1
SDO	3–2	2–1	2–2	1–1	~~15 Mar~~	1–0	~~11 Apr~~	~~5 Apr~~	4–0	4–1	4–5	~~17 May~~		2–2	0–2	~~26 Apr~~
SJC	4–0	~~26 Apr~~	3–2	~~24 May~~	1–3	~~15 Mar~~	1–2	~~11 Apr~~	3–0	~~22 Mar~~	3–2	0–3	3–1		3–1	3–1
Velsen	3–1	0–3	1–1	~~15 Mar~~	1–1	~~5 Apr~~	0–0	~~26 Apr~~	0–2	~~17 May~~	1–1	~~11 Apr~~	1–0	~~29 Mar~~		4–0
VOC	~~18 Apr~~	~~24 May~~	0–0	3–4	1–3	1–2	0–4	3–1	~~10 May~~	4–1	~~21 Mar~~	0–0	1–6	0–4	1–3	

Source: Soccerway
Legend: Blue = home team win; Yellow = draw; Red = away team win.

== Sunday B ==
=== Teams ===
Location of teams in the Sunday Hoofdklasse B 2019/20

Club	Location	Venue	Capacity
AWC	Wijchen	Sportpark De Wijchert	2,000
Baronie	Breda	Sportpark Blauwe Kei	7,000
EHC	Hoensbroek	Sportpark De Dem	3,000
Halsteren	Halsteren	Sportpark De Beek	1,800
IFC	Hendrik-Ido-Ambacht	Sportpark Schildman	1,500
Juliana '31	Malden	Sportpark De Broeklanden	1,500
Longa '30	Lichtenvoorde	Sportpark De Treffer	2,300
Meerssen	Meerssen	Sportpark Marsana	2,000
Minor	Nuth	Sportpark De Kollenberg	1,500
Moerse Boys	Zundert	Sportpark De Akkermolen	1,500
Nuenen	Nuenen	Sportpark Oude Landen	1,800
OJC Rosmalen	Rosmalen	Sportpark De Groote Wielen	3,000
RKZVC	Zieuwent	Sportpark De Greune Weide	1,500
Silvolde	Silvolde	Sportpark De Munsterman	1,500
UDI '19	Uden	Sportpark Parkzicht	5,000
Unitas	Gorinchem	Sportpark Molenvliet	3,000

>> Competition cancelled, what is listed below is the situation on 8 March 2020, the date the last matches were played.<<

=== Standings ===
Pos	Team	Pld	W	D	L	GF	GA	GD	Pts	Promotion, qualification or relegation
1	Unitas (Note: Winner of the first period (games 1-10).) (P)	20	14	5	1	35	12	+23	47	Promotion to Derde Divisie
2	Halsteren	20	12	5	3	42	18	+24	41	~~Qualification to promotion play-offs~~
3	IFC	20	11	2	7	46	25	+21	35	~~Qualification to promotion play-offs~~
4	Baronie	20	10	5	5	38	19	+19	35	~~Qualification to promotion play-offs~~
5	RKZVC	20	9	7	4	40	25	+15	34	
6	Juliana '31	20	8	7	5	48	33	+15	31	
7	OJC Rosmalen	20	9	3	8	36	33	+3	30	
8	UDI '19	19	8	5	6	28	22	+6	29	
9	AWC	19	7	4	8	21	32	−11	25	
10	Longa '30	19	7	3	9	32	35	−3	24	
11	Meerssen	19	5	7	7	20	29	−9	22	
12	Silvolde	19	5	5	9	19	28	−9	20	
13	Minor	19	6	1	12	21	46	−25	19	~~Qualification to relegation play-offs~~
14	Moerse Boys	20	4	6	10	29	38	−9	18	~~Qualification to relegation play-offs~~
15	EHC	20	5	1	14	23	49	−26	16	~~Relegation to Eerste Klasse~~
16	Nuenen	20	2	4	14	10	44	−34	10	~~Relegation to Eerste Klasse~~

Source: Soccerway
Rules for classification: Season in progress: 1) Most points won; 2) Less points lost; 3) Goal difference; 4) Goals scored; 5) Alphabetical order; End of season: 1) Points; 2) Goal difference; 3) Goals scored; 4) Head-to-head points; 5) Head-to-head goal difference; 6) Head-to-head away goals scored; 7) Play-off if relevant for deciding champion, relegation or participating in a European league, otherwise by draw. 8) Penalty shoot-out (only after a play-off)
(P) Promoted

=== Fixtures/results ===
Home \ Away	AWC	BAR	EHC	HAL	IFC	JUL	LON	MRS	MIN	MOE	NUE	OJC	RKZ	SIL	UDI	UNI
AWC		0–2	2–1	~~10 May~~	~~24 May~~	~~19 Apr~~	2–2	3–1	1–0	4–2	0–0	1–0	~~15 Mar~~	0–1	0–2	~~5 Apr~~
Baronie	~~11 Apr~~		6–0	1–1	1–1	2–0	4–1	1–0	0–4	2–0	4–0	~~17 May~~	~~26 Apr~~	4–2	~~22 Mar~~	0–1
EHC	1–0	~~24 May~~		0–3	0–4	~~15 Mar~~	~~22 Mar~~	0–1	5–1	2–2	~~11 Apr~~	4–1	~~29 Mar~~	0–2	~~26 Apr~~	0–1
Halsteren	1–1	1–0	5–2		4–1	3–0	4–2	~~15 Mar~~	1–0	~~11 Apr~~	~~5 Apr~~	~~26 Apr~~	2–2	5–0	0–1	~~17 May~~
IFC	3–0	~~15 Mar~~	3–0	2–0		~~5 Apr~~	~~17 May~~	3–0	4–1	2–3	~~26 Apr~~	4–2	0–1	5–1	3–2	~~11 Apr~~
Juliana '31	7–1	~~29 Mar~~	4–1	1–4	1–1		~~11 Apr~~	3–3	~~17 May~~	3–0	7–0	2–2	1–3	~~22 Mar~~	4–1	~~26 Apr~~
Longa '30	1–1	0–3	3–4	~~29 Mar~~	3–1	0–2		~~24 May~~	~~26 Apr~~	3–2	3–0	~~5 Apr~~	0–3	~~18 Apr~~	0–2	~~15 Mar~~
Meerssen	~~26 Apr~~	2–1	0–1	1–1	~~22 Mar~~	2–2	0–2		~~13 Apr~~	~~17 May~~	1–0	~~11 Apr~~	2–1	1–0	1–1	1–1
Minor	2–0	~~10 May~~	~~19 Apr~~	~~24 May~~	0–5	2–2	1–4	3–0		0–2	~~15 Mar~~	~~29 Mar~~	~~5 Apr~~	2–0	1–0	0–3
Moerse Boys	~~29 Mar~~	2–2	~~5 Apr~~	0–1	~~19 Apr~~	~~24 May~~	~~10 May~~	2–2	4–0		4–0	~~15 Mar~~	2–2	0–0	0–3	0–2
Nuenen	0–1	~~19 Apr~~	3–0	0–3	1–0	~~10 May~~	1–3	~~29 Mar~~	1–2	~~22 Mar~~		1–1	1–1	~~24 May~~	2–2	0–1
OJC Rosmalen	~~21 Mar~~	0–0	3–2	1–3	0–3	0–1	2–1	3–1	4–2	3–0	6–0		~~19 Apr~~	~~10 May~~	~~24 May~~	1–3
RKZVC	5–2	1–1	3–0	~~22 Mar~~	3–1	4–4	0–2	~~10 May~~	6–0	2–1	~~17 May~~	1–2		1–0	~~11 Apr~~	0–3
Silvolde	~~13 Apr~~	~~5 Apr~~	~~17 May~~	3–0	~~29 Mar~~	1–2	2–1	1–1	~~11 Apr~~	~~26 Apr~~	2–0	0–1	1–1		~~15 Mar~~	3–3
UDI '19	~~17 May~~	2–4	2–0	~~19 Apr~~	~~10 May~~	1–0	~~3 May~~	~~5 Apr~~	4–0	2–2	2–0	1–3	0–0	0–0		0–2
Unitas	1–2	1–0	~~10 May~~	0–0	2–0	2–2	1–1	~~19 Apr~~	~~22 Mar~~	3–1	1–0	3–1	~~24 May~~	1–0	~~29 Mar~~	

Source: Soccerway
Legend: Blue = home team win; Yellow = draw; Red = away team win.
