= 2017–18 Eerste Klasse =

Eerste Klasse
- Season: 2017–18

2017–18 Eerste Klasse was a season in the Dutch Eerste Klasse league.

== Champions ==
Below section champions promoted to the Hoofdklasse, along with other teams.

=== Saturday ===
- A West I: RKAV Volendam
- B West II: SC Feyenoord
- C South: VV DUNO
- D East: SVZW
- E North: VV Buitenpost

=== Sunday ===
- A West I: Fortuna Wormerveer
- B West II: GVV Unitas
- C South I: SV AWC
- D South II: RKSV Minor
- E East: RKZVC
- F North: VV Hoogeveen

== Saturday sections ==
Participating clubs were:

=== A: West I ===
- FC Aalsmeer
- SV ARC
- FC Breukelen
- Combinatie Sportclub Wilnis
- Forum Sport
- SV Marken
- Sportlust '46
- Vitesse Delft
- RKAV Volendam
- HVV Te Werve
- RKVV Westlandia
- WV-HEDW
- XerxesDZB
- Zwaluwen '30

=== B: West II ===
- VV Brielle
- Bruse Boys
- Door Combinatie Verkregen
- SV Deltasport Vlaardingen
- SC Feyenoord
- VV Heerjansdam
- SV Heinenoord
- VV Kloetinge
- VV Nieuw-Lekkerland
- VV Nieuwenhoorn
- SV Oranje Wit
- VV Oude Maas
- VV SHO
- VVGZ

=== C: South ===
- VV Bennekom
- Delta Sports '95
- DHSC
- DTS Ede
- VV DUNO
- GJS Gorinchem
- GRC '14
- LRC Leerdam
- VV De Merino's
- VV Montfoort
- VV Sliedrecht
- SVL
- VV Woudenberg
- VV WNC

=== D: East ===
- DETO Twenterand
- DOS '37
- ASV Dronten
- DZC '68
- Flevo Boys
- Go-Ahead Kampen
- VV Hierden
- VV KHC
- VV Nunspeet
- SDV Barneveld
- SVZW Wierden
- Vroomshoopse Boys
- WHC Wezep
- FC Zutphen

=== E: North ===
- VV Balk
- Be Quick Dokkum
- Blauw Wit '34
- VV Buitenpost
- Drachtster Boys
- VV Gorecht
- VV Groningen
- Noordscheschut
- Olde Veste '54
- Oranje Nassau Groningen
- PKC '83
- VEV '67
- VV Winsum
- ZMVV Zeerobben

== Sunday sections ==
Participating clubs were:

=== A: West I ===
- AFC '34
- AGB
- VV Assendelft
- RKVV DEM
- HFC EDO
- Fortuna Wormerveer
- SV Hillegom
- SV Hoofddorp
- JOS Watergraafsmeer
- Legmeervogels
- LSVV
- FC Uitgeest
- RKVV Velsen
- AVV Zeeburgia

=== B: West II ===
- VV BMT
- FC Boshuizen
- DVV Delft
- SV Den Hoorn
- VV Hoogland
- RVV Kocatepe
- VV Nieuwerkerk
- Olympia Gouda
- PSV Poortugaal
- RVC '33
- Spartaan '20
- GVV Unitas
- SV VELO
- VOC

=== C: South I ===
- VV Alverna
- SV AWC
- Best Vooruit
- RKVV Brabantia
- RKVV DESO
- SV DOSKO
- VV Gestel
- HVCH
- RKSV Nemelaer
- Oirschot Vooruit
- Tilburg
- SV TOP
- Rood-Wit Willebrord
- SC 't Zand

=== D: South II ===
- RKSV Bekkerveld
- VV Chevremont
- SV Deurne
- VV Geldrop
- FC Hoensbroek
- RKSV Minor
- VV Schaesberg
- SC Susteren
- VV De Valk
- Venlosche Boys
- SV Venray
- Wilhelmina '08
- RKSV Wittenhorst
- ZSV

=== E: East ===
- Sportclub Bemmel
- KSV BWO
- VV Heino
- Longa '30
- SC NEC
- Quick 1888
- vv Rigtersbleek
- RKZVC
- Rohda Raalte
- SV Schalkhaar
- RKVV STEVO
- HVV Tubantia
- FC Winterswijk
- RKSV De Zweef

=== F: North ===
- MVV Alcides
- FC Assen
- VV Bergum
- VV Emmen
- LAC Frisia 1883
- FVC
- GAVC
- GRC Groningen
- VV Hoogeveen
- VV Nieuw Buinen
- VV Noordster
- VV Rolder Boys
- SVBO
- WVV 1896
