= 2022–23 Vierde Divisie =

Vierde Divisie
- Season: 2022–23

The 2022–23 Vierde Divisie is a Dutch football league season played in four sections, two on Saturday and two on Sunday. The champions of each Vierde Divisie section will be directly promoted to the Derde Divisie; other teams can get promoted through play-offs.

== Saturday A ==
Vierde Divisie Saturday A
- Season: 2022–23
- Champions: Kloetinge
- Promoted: Kloetinge; ODIN '59
- Relegated: Spijkenisse; WNC; Jodan Boys; De Dijk
- Matches played: 240
- Goals scored: 799 (3.33 per match)

=== Teams ===
Location of teams in the Saturday Vierde Divisie A 2022-23
South Holland clubs in the Saturday Vierde Divisie A 2022-23

Club	Home City
Achilles Veen	Veen
ARC	Alphen aan den Rijn
Capelle	Capelle aan den IJssel
De Dijk	Amsterdam
Feyenoord	Rotterdam
GOES	Goes
's-Gravenzande	's-Gravenzande
Jodan Boys	Gouda
Kloetinge	Kloetinge
Nieuwenhoorn	Hellevoetsluis
ODIN '59	Heemskerk
Poortugaal	Poortugaal
Smitshoek	Barendrecht
Spijkenisse	Spijkenisse
WNC	Waardenburg
Zwaluwen	Vlaardingen

=== Number of teams by province ===
Number of teams	Province	Team(s)
10	South Holland	ARC, Capelle, Feyenoord, GOES, 's-Gravenzande, Jodan Boys, Nieuwenhoorn, Poortugaal, Smitshoek, Spijkenisse, Zwaluwen
2	North Holland	De Dijk, ODIN '59
2	Zeeland	GOES, Kloetinge
1	Gelderland	WNC
1	North Brabant	Achilles Veen

=== Standings ===
Pos	Team	Pld	W	D	L	GF	GA	GD	Pts	Promotion, qualification or relegation
1	Kloetinge (C, P)	30	19	5	6	60	38	+22	62	Promotion to Derde Divisie
2	Capelle (Note: Winner of the Second and Third Period (Rounds 11–20 and 21–30))	30	17	6	7	56	38	+18	57	Qualification for promotion play-offs
3	Smitshoek	30	17	6	7	57	41	+16	57	Qualification for promotion play-offs
4	GOES	30	15	9	6	64	41	+23	54	
5	ARC	30	15	6	9	65	50	+15	51	
6	Nieuwenhoorn	30	16	3	11	58	56	+2	51	
7	Poortugaal	30	13	10	7	55	42	+13	49	
8	ODIN '59 (Note: Winner of the First Period (Rounds 1–10)) (O, P)	30	13	5	12	73	58	+15	44	Qualification for promotion play-offs
9	's-Gravenzande	30	13	4	13	62	52	+10	43	
10	Zwaluwen	30	8	12	10	33	36	−3	36	
11	Achilles Veen	30	9	9	12	35	51	−16	36	
12	Feyenoord	30	8	10	12	37	47	−10	34	
13	Spijkenisse (R)	30	9	5	16	51	38	+13	32	Qualification for relegation play-offs
14	WNC (R)	30	9	4	17	38	63	−25	31	Qualification for relegation play-offs
15	Jodan Boys (R)	30	7	6	17	38	61	−23	27	Relegation to Eerste Klasse
16	De Dijk (R)	30	1	2	27	17	87	−70	5	Relegation to Eerste Klasse

Source: Hollandsevelden
Rules for classification: Season in progress: 1) Most points won; 2) Less points lost; 3) Goal difference; 4) Goals scored; 5) Alphabetical order; End of season: 1) Points; 2) Goal difference; 3) Goals scored; 4) Head-to-head points; 5) Head-to-head goal difference; 6) Head-to-head away goals scored; 7) Play-off if relevant for deciding champion, relegation or participating in a European league, otherwise by draw. 8) Penalty shoot-out (only after a play-off)
(C) Champions; (O) Play-off winners; (P) Promoted; (R) Relegated

=== Fixtures/results ===
Home \ Away	ACH	ARC	CAP	DIJ	FEY	GOE	GRA	JOD	KLO	NIE	ODI	POO	SMI	SPI	WNC	ZWA
Achilles Veen		2–1	1–0	3–2	1–1	2–3	2–0	0–1	0–0	0–2	1–4	0–0	0–0	2–1	2–1	2–1
ARC	1–0		1–3	4–2	4–2	1–1	4–1	1–1	4–1	4–2	2–3	4–1	2–2	3–1	2–1	3–1
Capelle	2–1	1–0		6–0	1–0	2–5	2–1	1–0	1–1	5–0	2–0	2–2	0–0	1–0	3–0	3–2
De Dijk	1–2	2–3	0–3		0–2	0–3	1–5	1–3	0–3	0–1	0–5	0–3	0–4	0–8	1–2	1–1
Feyenoord	1–1	2–2	2–3	1–1		0–4	1–1	2–0	2–0	2–2	2–0	0–1	4–0	1–0	2–1	2–1
GOES	4–0	2–1	3–1	3–0	3–0		1–7	4–2	1–1	4–0	2–2	2–2	0–1	0–2	3–3	1–1
's-Gravenzande	5–0	3–0	0–0	1–0	4–2	1–2		4–0	2–3	3–1	3–2	3–2	2–3	1–0	2–2	1–1
Jodan Boys	2–2	5–3	2–2	4–3	0–0	0–2	0–3		0–1	0–3	1–0	0–3	0–3	1–0	4–2	0–1
Kloetinge	4–1	3–2	4–0	2–0	2–0	1–0	4–1	2–1		3–1	2–1	1–0	1–4	1–1	7–1	1–3
Nieuwenhoorn	3–2	2–2	1–3	2–0	2–1	2–2	3–1	4–2	4–1		4–3	4–2	4–0	1–0	0–1	0–1
ODIN '59	4–1	2–3	1–1	5–0	1–1	2–2	5–3	3–2	2–3	2–4		3–3	2–3	2–1	2–1	3–1
Poortugaal	2–2	2–2	3–1	2–0	1–1	0–1	3–1	2–2	1–0	4–0	3–2		1–4	2–1	2–0	0–0
Smitshoek	2–1	0–1	0–4	1–0	4–1	2–0	5–0	3–2	2–2	2–1	2–4	3–2		3–2	1–0	1–2
Spijkenisse	1–1	0–1	7–1	2–0	4–0	5–1	1–0	1–1	0–1	4–0	4–3	1–2	1–1		0–1	2–2
WNC	2–3	0–3	1–0	3–1	2–1	0–5	1–3	3–1	1–2	1–3	1–4	1–3	1–0	3–1		1–1
Zwaluwen	0–0	2–1	0–2	0–1	1–1	0–0	1–0	2–1	2–3	1–2	0–1	1–1	1–1	2–0	1–1	

Source: Hollandsevelden
Legend: Blue = home team win; Yellow = draw; Red = away team win.

== Saturday B ==
Vierde Divisie Saturday B
- Season: 2022–23
- Champions: Eemdijk
- Promoted: Eemdijk; Genemuiden
- Relegated: Flevo Boys; Apeldoorn; Olde Veste; HZVV
- Matches played: 240
- Goals scored: 771 (3.21 per match)

=== Teams ===
Location of teams in the Saturday Vierde Divisie B 2022-23
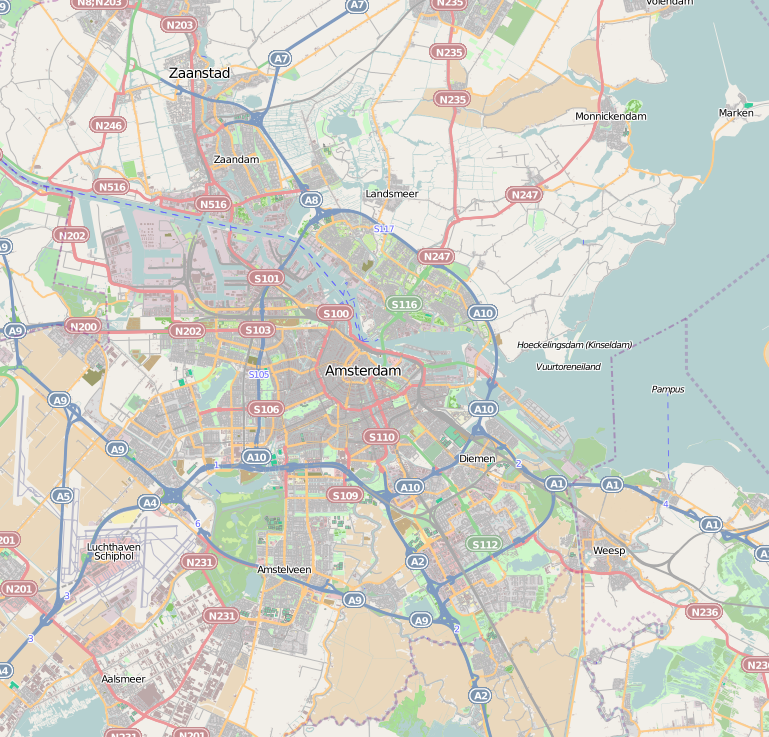
Amsterdam clubs in the Saturday Vierde Divisie B 2022-23

Club	Home City
Ajax	Amsterdam
Apeldoorn	Apeldoorn
AZSV	Aalten
Berkum	Zwolle
Buitenpost	Buitenpost
DETO	Vriezenveen
DHSC	Utrecht
Eemdijk	Bunschoten
Flevo Boys	Emmeloord
Genemuiden	Genemuiden
Huizen	Huizen
HZVV	Hoogeveen
Olde Veste	Steenwijk
SDV	Barneveld
Swift	Amsterdam
WV-HEDW	Amsterdam

=== Number of teams by province ===
Number of teams	Province	Team(s)
4	North Holland	Ajax, Huizen, Swift, WV-HEDW
4	Overijssel	Berkum, DETO, Genemuiden, Olde Veste
3	Gelderland	Apeldoorn, AZSV, SDV
2	Utrecht	DHSC, Eemdijk
1	Drenthe	HZVV
1	Flevoland	Flevo Boys
1	Friesland	Buitenpost

=== Standings ===
Pos	Team	Pld	W	D	L	GF	GA	GD	Pts	Promotion, qualification or relegation
1	Eemdijk (Note: Winner of the First Period (Rounds 1–10)) (C, P)	30	21	3	6	83	39	+44	66	Promotion to Derde Divisie
2	Swift (Note: Winner of the Third Period (Rounds 21–30))	30	17	6	7	58	39	+19	57	Qualification for promotion play-offs
3	Genemuiden (Note: Winner of the Second Period (Rounds 11–20)) (O, P)	30	15	9	6	57	41	+16	54	Qualification for promotion play-offs
4	AZSV	30	14	6	10	49	38	+11	48	Qualification for promotion play-offs
5	DETO	30	13	8	9	60	44	+16	47	
6	Huizen	30	12	7	11	59	45	+14	43	
7	WV-HEDW	30	12	7	11	52	55	−3	43	
8	Berkum	30	11	8	11	45	37	+8	41	
9	Ajax	30	10	11	9	41	37	+4	41	
10	DHSC	30	13	4	13	53	58	−5	40 (Note: DHSC were deducted 3 points for being involved in a mass brawl after the match against Buitenpost on 22 April 2023)	
11	SDV	30	10	7	13	40	47	−7	37	
12	Buitenpost	30	9	6	15	28	54	−26	32 (Note: Buitenpost were deducted 1 point for being involved in a mass brawl after the match against DHSC on 22 April 2023)	
13	Flevo Boys (R)	30	8	6	16	41	59	−18	30	Qualification for relegation play-offs
14	Apeldoorn (R)	30	7	9	14	36	58	−22	30	Qualification for relegation play-offs
15	Olde Veste (R)	30	8	5	17	38	61	−23	29	Relegation to Eerste Klasse
16	HZVV (R)	30	6	6	18	31	59	−28	24	Relegation to Eerste Klasse

Source: Hollandsevelden
Rules for classification: Season in progress: 1) Most points won; 2) Less points lost; 3) Goal difference; 4) Goals scored; 5) Alphabetical order; End of season: 1) Points; 2) Goal difference; 3) Goals scored; 4) Head-to-head points; 5) Head-to-head goal difference; 6) Head-to-head away goals scored; 7) Play-off if relevant for deciding champion, relegation or participating in a European league, otherwise by draw. 8) Penalty shoot-out (only after a play-off)
(C) Champions; (O) Play-off winners; (P) Promoted; (R) Relegated

=== Fixtures/results ===
Home \ Away	AJA	APE	AZS	BER	BUI	DET	DHS	EEM	FLE	GEN	HUI	HZV	OLD	SDV	SWI	WVH
Ajax		4–2	2–0	2–2	2–0	1–0	4–0	0–5	2–1	0–0	2–1	2–1	0–1	2–2	3–4	2–3
Apeldoorn	2–2		2–3	2–1	0–2	1–2	2–0	4–2	3–2	2–2	1–1	2–0	0–3	0–1	1–1	1–0
AZSV	1–0	5–0		2–0	2–2	1–1	2–0	0–3	1–1	0–0	0–3	3–0	2–1	5–0	1–2	1–2
Berkum	4–2	0–0	1–1		1–2	2–2	3–0	1–2	1–0	2–2	6–0	2–0	3–0	1–2	0–1	0–3
Buitenpost	0–2	2–2	0–0	2–0		0–1	2–1	1–0	2–0	0–2	1–3	1–1	1–2	1–1	0–3	4–1
DETO	1–3	3–1	4–1	2–1	0–0		0–4	2–2	5–0	3–0	3–0	1–0	5–1	2–0	4–1	2–3
DHSC	1–0	2–2	3–1	1–0	5–2	1–1		0–4	4–7	1–1	6–5	4–0	3–0	0–2	1–2	2–0
Eemdijk	0–0	5–0	1–0	1–2	6–0	2–1	4–0		4–0	2–0	1–5	2–1	2–0	1–0	2–1	6–0
Flevo Boys	0–1	2–1	1–0	0–2	3–0	2–2	0–3	5–2		1–2	1–4	2–0	4–2	1–2	0–1	1–0
Genemuiden	1–1	4–1	4–3	1–1	4–0	3–1	1–0	3–4	4–2		2–1	3–2	2–1	2–1	3–2	3–1
Huizen	0–0	4–1	1–2	0–2	2–0	2–2	5–1	1–2	5–0	2–0		0–0	1–1	2–0	0–1	1–1
HZVV	0–0	0–0	1–2	1–2	1–0	1–5	1–4	5–1	1–1	0–3	1–4		2–1	2–1	3–2	1–1
Olde Veste	1–0	1–0	0–4	1–2	0–1	3–1	1–3	3–5	0–0	2–2	3–1	1–3		2–2	3–2	1–2
SDV	1–1	2–0	2–3	3–1	1–2	2–2	0–1	0–5	1–0	1–0	0–2	4–0	3–3		1–1	4–0
Swift	1–1	0–1	1–2	1–1	5–0	2–0	1–1	3–3	3–2	1–0	3–1	3–2	2–0	3–0		3–2
WV-HEDW	2–1	2–2	0–1	1–1	3–0	4–2	5–1	1–4	2–2	3–3	2–2	2–1	3–0	2–1	1–2	

Source: Hollandsevelden
Legend: Blue = home team win; Yellow = draw; Red = away team win.

== Sunday A ==
Vierde Divisie Sunday A
- Season: 2022–23
- Champions: Hoogeveen
- Promoted: Hoogeveen
- Relegated: De Zouaven; Velsen; Alcides; VKW
- Matches played: 240
- Goals scored: 828 (3.45 per match)

=== Teams ===
Location of teams in the Sunday Vierde Divisie A 2022-23
South Holland clubs in the Sunday Vierde Divisie A 2022-23

Club	Home City
Alcides	Meppel
Alphense Boys	Alphen aan den Rijn
Be Quick	Haren
HBS	Den Haag
Heino	Heino
Hollandia	Hoorn
Hoogeveen	Hoogeveen
Purmersteijn	Purmerend
RKAVV	Leidschendam
ROHDA	Raalte
SJC	Noordwijk
Velsen	Velsen
VKW	Westerbork
VOC	Rotterdam
Westlandia	Naaldwijk
De Zouaven	Grootebroek

=== Number of teams by province ===
Number of teams	Province	Team(s)
6	South Holland	Alphense Boys, HBS, RKAVV, SJC, VOC, Westlandia
4	North Holland	Hollandia, Purmersteijn, Velsen, De Zouaven
3	Drenthe	Alcides, Hoogeveen, VKW
2	Overijssel	Heino, ROHDA
1	Groningen	Be Quick

=== Standings ===
Pos	Team	Pld	W	D	L	GF	GA	GD	Pts	Promotion, qualification or relegation
1	Hoogeveen (Note: Winner of the Second Period (Rounds 11–20)) (C, P)	30	18	8	4	75	34	+41	62	Promotion to Derde Divisie
2	RKAVV	30	18	7	5	48	21	+27	61	Qualification for promotion play-offs
3	Purmersteijn	30	18	6	6	65	35	+30	60	
4	HBS (Note: Winner of the First Period (Rounds 1–10))	30	16	8	6	66	41	+25	56	Qualification for promotion play-offs
5	Be Quick (Note: Winner of the Third Period (Rounds 21–30))	30	15	10	5	55	25	+30	55	Qualification for promotion play-offs
6	SJC	30	15	5	10	63	59	+4	50	
7	ROHDA	30	15	4	11	61	50	+11	49	
8	Westlandia	30	14	6	10	57	56	+1	48	
9	Hollandia	30	12	10	8	62	43	+19	46	
10	Heino	30	11	4	15	43	40	+3	37	
11	Alphense Boys	30	10	5	15	49	68	−19	35	
12	VOC	30	8	9	13	50	59	−9	33	
13	De Zouaven (R)	30	7	6	17	46	71	−25	27	Qualification for relegation play-offs
14	Velsen (R)	30	6	4	20	39	71	−32	22	Qualification for relegation play-offs
15	Alcides (R)	30	4	3	23	28	82	−54	15	Relegation to Eerste Klasse
16	VKW (R)	30	3	5	22	21	73	−52	14	Relegation to Eerste Klasse

Source: Hollandsevelden
Rules for classification: Season in progress: 1) Most points won; 2) Less points lost; 3) Goal difference; 4) Goals scored; 5) Alphabetical order; End of season: 1) Points; 2) Goal difference; 3) Goals scored; 4) Head-to-head points; 5) Head-to-head goal difference; 6) Head-to-head away goals scored; 7) Play-off if relevant for deciding champion, relegation or participating in a European league, otherwise by draw. 8) Penalty shoot-out (only after a play-off)
(C) Champions; (P) Promoted; (R) Relegated

=== Fixtures/results ===
Home \ Away	ALC	ALP	BEQ	HBS	HEI	HOL	HOO	PUR	RKA	ROH	SJC	VEL	VKW	VOC	WES	ZOU
Alcides		1–4	0–5	0–5	0–2	1–5	1–3	0–2	0–1	1–0	0–1	2–1	2–2	1–1	2–3	2–2
Alphense Boys	1–3		0–0	1–4	2–1	1–3	1–6	0–3	2–0	4–4	3–3	4–3	2–0	2–1	2–3	4–1
Be Quick	1–0	4–1		3–1	0–0	1–1	0–1	2–1	0–1	2–0	2–2	2–0	1–0	1–3	2–0	2–0
HBS	3–1	2–2	2–0		3–0	2–2	4–2	0–1	0–0	0–4	0–0	3–1	3–0	2–1	0–1	5–2
Heino	2–1	4–0	0–3	0–1		1–3	0–1	2–3	1–2	0–2	1–3	1–0	3–1	2–1	3–0	1–2
Hollandia	4–2	2–0	1–4	1–2	1–1		2–2	0–0	0–1	1–0	5–0	4–1	5–0	6–0	0–3	0–0
Hoogeveen	6–1	4–1	0–0	2–2	0–0	1–1		4–3	1–1	2–2	3–2	3–1	8–2	2–4	1–0	2–0
Purmersteijn	5–1	2–1	1–1	2–2	2–1	3–2	0–0		0–3	5–0	1–2	3–2	6–0	3–3	4–0	1–0
RKAVV	1–0	2–1	0–0	3–2	2–0	2–2	1–0	1–2		2–0	0–1	3–0	4–1	2–0	4–2	0–1
ROHDA	5–1	2–1	0–0	1–2	2–0	3–1	3–2	0–2	0–2		1–3	4–0	4–0	4–3	3–1	2–0
SJC	3–0	4–1	4–2	3–3	0–3	2–2	1–4	2–1	2–5	7–1		3–0	3–1	2–1	2–4	1–5
Velsen	4–0	0–0	1–4	1–2	1–4	3–1	0–4	0–1	1–4	1–3	4–1		3–1	2–2	2–2	2–1
VKW	0–2	0–1	1–3	3–2	1–2	1–1	0–1	0–2	1–0	0–0	1–3	0–1		1–2	2–2	0–0
VOC	2–0	3–4	1–1	1–2	1–1	1–3	0–2	1–1	1–1	3–2	2–1	4–1	0–1		0–3	3–3
Westlandia	4–2	2–0	3–3	1–5	2–1	1–3	1–6	3–2	0–0	0–1	3–0	2–2	3–0	1–1		3–1
De Zouaven	4–1	1–3	0–6	2–2	0–6	4–0	0–2	2–3	0–0	4–8	0–2	3–1	4–1	2–4	2–4	

Source: Hollandsevelden
Legend: Blue = home team win; Yellow = draw; Red = away team win.

== Sunday B ==
Vierde Divisie Sunday B
- Season: 2022–23
- Champions: Meerssen
- Promoted: Meerssen; Kampong; AWC
- Relegated: Silvolde; Moerse Boys; RKZVC
- Matches played: 240
- Goals scored: 776 (3.23 per match)

=== Teams ===
Location of teams in the Sunday Vierde Divisie B 2022-23
Gelderland clubs in the Sunday Vierde Divisie B 2022-23

Club	Home City
AWC	Wijchen
EVV	Echt
Halsteren	Halsteren
Hoogland	Hoogland
HVCH	Heesch
Juliana '31	Malden
Kampong	Utrecht
Longa '30	Lichtenvoorde
Meerssen	Meerssen
Moerse Boys	Zundert
Nuenen	Nuenen
Orion	Nijmegen
RKZVC	Zieuwent
Silvolde	Silvolde
Unitas '30	Etten-Leur
Venray	Venray

=== Number of teams by province ===
Number of teams	Province	Team(s)
6	Gelderland	AWC, Juliana '31, Longa '30, Orion, RKZVC, Silvolde
5	North Brabant	Halsteren, HVCH, Moerse Boys, Nuenen, Unitas '30
3	Limburg	EVV, Meerssen, Venray
2	Utrecht	Hoogland, Kampong

=== Standings ===
Pos	Team	Pld	W	D	L	GF	GA	GD	Pts	Promotion, qualification or relegation
1	Meerssen (Note: Winner of the Third Period (Rounds 21–30)) (C, P)	30	21	6	3	61	26	+35	69	Promotion to Derde Divisie
2	Kampong (O, P)	30	16	6	8	56	27	+29	54	Qualification for promotion play-offs
3	Juliana '31 (Note: Winner of the Second Period (Rounds 11–20))	30	15	5	10	64	44	+20	50	Qualification for promotion play-offs
4	Hoogland	30	13	9	8	55	49	+6	48	
5	Longa '30	30	14	5	11	49	35	+14	47	
6	Venray	30	13	7	10	64	58	+6	46	
7	Halsteren	30	12	9	9	50	40	+10	45	
8	Nuenen	30	13	6	11	40	36	+4	45	
9	AWC (Note: Winner of the First Period (Rounds 1–10)) (O, P)	30	13	6	11	51	55	−4	45	Qualification for promotion play-offs
10	Orion	30	13	5	12	49	52	−3	44	
11	HVCH	30	13	5	12	47	50	−3	44	
12	Unitas '30	30	12	3	15	50	57	−7	39	
13	EVV (O)	30	10	7	13	38	40	−2	37	Qualification for relegation play-offs
14	Silvolde (R)	30	6	8	16	31	50	−19	26	Qualification for relegation play-offs
15	Moerse Boys (R)	30	7	3	20	47	72	−25	24	Relegation to Eerste Klasse
16	RKZVC (R)	30	2	4	24	24	85	−61	10	Relegation to Eerste Klasse

Source: Hollandsevelden
Rules for classification: Season in progress: 1) Most points won; 2) Less points lost; 3) Goal difference; 4) Goals scored; 5) Alphabetical order; End of season: 1) Points; 2) Goal difference; 3) Goals scored; 4) Head-to-head points; 5) Head-to-head goal difference; 6) Head-to-head away goals scored; 7) Play-off if relevant for deciding champion, relegation or participating in a European league, otherwise by draw. 8) Penalty shoot-out (only after a play-off)
(C) Champions; (O) Play-off winners; (P) Promoted; (R) Relegated

=== Fixtures/results ===
Home \ Away	AWC	EVV	HAL	HOO	HVC	JUL	KAM	LON	MEE	MOE	NUE	ORI	RKZ	SIL	UNI	VEN
AWC		0–2	1–0	2–2	1–0	0–3	1–3	2–2	0–1	6–3	0–0	4–1	6–0	2–3	2–0	3–3
EVV	4–0		0–0	0–1	2–0	3–0	0–0	1–2	2–3	3–1	1–1	0–1	2–1	1–0	3–2	1–1
Halsteren	7–0	1–1		1–1	0–2	0–4	0–0	0–1	1–3	3–2	1–1	1–0	3–0	2–1	0–0	3–1
Hoogland	2–2	1–1	3–2		1–3	3–3	0–0	4–3	0–2	3–0	1–0	4–2	2–1	2–2	2–2	3–1
HVCH	1–3	2–1	1–2	2–1		1–1	0–3	0–3	0–2	4–1	1–0	0–1	2–0	0–4	4–1	1–1
Juliana '31	4–1	3–1	1–1	4–1	1–1		0–1	0–1	1–0	4–2	2–0	1–1	2–0	7–0	0–1	1–3
Kampong	1–2	2–0	4–1	1–2	1–1	4–0		1–1	3–1	0–0	0–1	3–2	3–0	2–0	0–2	8–3
Longa '30	2–0	2–0	0–1	2–1	1–2	0–1	0–2		2–2	3–0	0–2	1–1	5–1	1–0	4–1	4–1
Meerssen	3–0	3–1	2–2	1–0	1–1	2–0	2–0	3–1		4–1	3–2	2–2	4–1	0–0	2–0	4–1
Moerse Boys	1–2	5–1	1–1	4–3	2–3	2–0	0–5	3–1	1–2		1–2	2–0	4–1	1–0	1–3	1–3
Nuenen	0–1	0–0	1–3	1–2	4–0	3–1	1–0	2–0	0–0	3–1		0–1	2–0	2–0	2–0	1–3
Orion	0–0	1–0	3–5	4–1	2–3	0–6	0–1	1–0	1–3	4–3	4–0		3–2	1–0	1–0	1–1
RKZVC	1–3	4–2	0–5	0–2	0–5	1–3	0–4	0–1	1–2	1–1	2–3	1–7		1–1	3–2	2–3
Silvolde	0–3	1–2	1–2	1–1	2–1	4–1	1–2	0–4	0–2	2–1	1–1	1–2	0–0		0–0	2–0
Unitas '30	2–3	2–1	2–0	1–2	1–3	4–6	3–2	2–0	0–1	2–1	3–5	3–2	3–0	4–3		3–1
Venray	4–1	0–2	3–2	1–3	7–3	3–4	3–0	1–1	2–1	3–1	3–0	4–0	0–0	1–1	3–1	

Source: Hollandsevelden
Legend: Blue = home team win; Yellow = draw; Red = away team win.

== Play-offs ==
=== Promotion ===
In each competition teams play periods of 10 games, three times per season (30 games per season). After each period the best team which has not yet qualified earns a spot in the play-offs for the Derde Divisie as the period champion. 6 teams from the Saturday Vierde Divisie play against 2 teams from the Saturday Derde Divisie for 2 promotion spots. The teams from the Sunday leagues do the same.

=== Relegation ===
The teams in place 13 and 14 at the end of the season fight against relegation in the relegation play-offs. They face the period champions of the Eerste Klasse.

=== Derde divisie promotion/relegation play-offs ===
All times Central European Summer Time (UTC+2)

==== Saturday league ====
===== Bracket =====
Semifinals
VVOG	0	2	2
Smitshoek	1	4	5
Swift	2	0	2
ODIN '59	3	4	7

Final
Smitshoek	1	2	3
ODIN '59	3	3	6

===== Semifinals =====
30 May 2023
19:00

Smitshoek	1–0	VVOG

Sportpark Smitshoek, Barendrecht
3 June 2023
14:30

VVOG	2–4	Smitshoek

De Strokel, Harderwijk

Smitshoek won 5–2 on aggregate.

30 May 2023
20:00

ODIN '59	3–2	Swift

Sportpark Assumburg, Heemskerk
3 June 2023
14:30

Swift	0–4	ODIN '59

Olympiaplein, Amsterdam

ODIN '59 won 7–2 on aggregate.

===== Final =====
6 June 2023
20:00

ODIN '59	3–1	Smitshoek

Sportpark Assumburg, Heemskerk
10 June 2023
14:30

Smitshoek	2–3	ODIN '59

Sportpark Smitshoek, Barendrecht

ODIN '59 won 6–3 on aggregate.

===== Bracket =====
Semifinals
Capelle	2	4	6
AZSV	2	1	3
Excelsior '31	0	1	1
Genemuiden	2	1	3

Final
Capelle	1	2	3
Genemuiden	3	3	6

===== Semifinals =====
30 May 2023
19:30

AZSV	2–2	Capelle

Sportpark Villekamp, Aalten
3 June 2023
14:30

Capelle	4–1	AZSV

Sportpark 't Slot, Capelle aan den IJssel

Capelle won 6–3 on aggregate.

30 May 2023
20:00

Genemuiden	2–0	Excelsior '31
Streutker 29'; Popovic 31'	Report

Sportpark de Wetering, Genemuiden
3 June 2023
14:30

Excelsior '31	1–1	Genemuiden

Sportpark De Koerbelt, Rijssen

Genemuiden won 3–1 on aggregate.

===== Final =====
6 June 2023
20:00

Genemuiden	3–1	Capelle

Sportpark de Wetering, Genemuiden
10 June 2023
14:30

Capelle	2–3	Genemuiden

Sportpark 't Slot, Capelle aan den IJssel

Genemuiden won 6–3 on aggregate.

==== Sunday league ====
===== Bracket =====
Semifinals
Kampong	0	4	4
Be Quick	0	1	1
JOS Watergraafsmeer	2	4	6
HBS	2	0	2

Final
Kampong (a.e.t.)	0	3	3
JOS Watergraafsmeer	1	0	0

===== Semifinals =====
1 June 2023
20:00

HBS	2–2	JOS Watergraafsmeer

Sportpark Daal en Bergselaan, The Hague
4 June 2023
14:00

JOS Watergraafsmeer	4–0	HBS

Sportpark Drieburg, Amsterdam

JOS Watergraafsmeer won 6–2 on aggregate.

1 June 2023
20:00

Be Quick	0–0	Kampong

Stadion Esserberg, Haren
4 June 2023
14:30

Kampong	4–1	Be Quick

De Klapperboom, Utrecht

Kampong won 4–1 on aggregate.

===== Final =====
8 June 2023
20:00

JOS Watergraafsmeer	1–0	Kampong

Sportpark Drieburg, Amsterdam
11 June 2023
18:00

Kampong	3–0 (a.e.t.)	JOS Watergraafsmeer

De Klapperboom, Utrecht

Kampong won 3–1 on aggregate.

===== Bracket =====
Semifinals
Baronie	0	2	2
Juliana '31	1	0	1
RKAVV	0	1	1
AWC	0	2	2

Final
Baronie	1	0	1
AWC	1	1	2

===== Semifinals =====
1 June 2023
20:00

Juliana '31	1–0	Baronie

De Broeklanden, Malden
4 June 2023
14:00

Baronie	2–0	Juliana '31

De Blauwe Kei, Breda

Baronie won 2–1 on aggregate.

1 June 2023
20:00

AWC	0–0	RKAVV

Sportpark De Wijchert, Wijchen
4 June 2023
14:00

RKAVV	1–2	AWC

Kastelenring, Leidschendam

AWC won 2–1 on aggregate.

===== Final =====
8 June 2023
20:00

AWC	1–1	Baronie

Sportpark De Wijchert, Wijchen
11 June 2023
14:00

Baronie	0–1	AWC

De Blauwe Kei, Breda

AWC won 2–1 on aggregate.

===== Relegation play-off =====
Because Tweede Divisie team OFC, which placed last, withdrew its team, sunday league teams JOS Watergraafsmeer and Baronie played extra play-off matches. The best team over two legs remained in the Derde Divisie, whilst the loser relegated to the Vierde Divisie

15 June 2023
20:00

Baronie	3–1	JOS Watergraafsmeer

De Blauwe Kei, Breda
18 June 2023
14:00

JOS Watergraafsmeer	4–3	Baronie

Sportpark Drieburg, Amsterdam

Baronie won 6–5 on aggregate.
