= Jochem Jansen =

Dutch footballer (born 1990)

Personal information
- Date of birth: 4 January 1990 (age 36)
- Place of birth: Zevenaar, Netherlands
- Position: Centre-back

Team information
- Current team: De Graafschap (performance coach)

Youth career
- 1995–2000: Concordia-Wehl
- 2000–2009: De Graafschap

Senior career*
Years	Team	Apps	(Gls)
2009–2013	De Graafschap	51	(0)
2013–2017	FC Oss	96	(2)
2017	Roskilde	2	(0)
2018–2023	DUNO		
- * Club domestic league appearances and goals

Jochem Jansen (born 4 January 1990) is a Dutch former professional footballer who played as a centre-back.

== Career ==
=== De Graafschap ===
Jansen progressed through the youth teams of Concordia-Wehl before being scouted to the academy of De Graafschap in 2000. He made his professional debut on 4 December 2009 in a 3–0 win over Veendam, coming on as a late substitute for Cerezo Fung a Wing. That season, the club managed to win the Eerste Divisie title and promote to the Eredivisie, as Jansen mostly played for the reserves where he was team captain. In April 2011, Jansen signed a contract extension with De Graafschap until 2013.

=== FC Oss ===
On 2 September 2013, Jansen moved to FC Oss after his contract with De Graafschap had expired. He suffered a concussion in January 2014, after his teammate Marcel van der Sloot had accidentally shot a ball at the back of his head during practice. This sidelined him for the rest of the season. In May 2015, he signed a contract extension until 2017. He became team captain during his stint with Oss.

=== FC Roskilde ===
On 4 August 2017, Jansen signed with Danish 1st Division club FC Roskilde. He made his debut on two days later in a 3–2 home loss to Thisted FC, but suffered a serious knee injury after only 11 minutes on the pitch. He made his comeback on 11 October in a 3–1 away win over HB Køge, coming on as a substitute for Nicklas Mouritsen in the 76th minute. These appearances would remain his only games for the club.

=== DUNO ===
On 2 March 2018, Jansen joined VV DUNO of the Eerste Klasse, the club from Doorwerth then in the midst of a rapid rise through the Dutch amateur leagues. At the end of that season the team won the Eerste Klasse C title and promotion to the Hoofdklasse, the highest level of Saturday amateur football. Jansen remained with DUNO for the club's four-season spell in the Hoofdklasse, during which it also won the KNVB District Cup East in 2018–19.

In February 2023, Jansen announced that he would retire at the end of the 2022–23 season, by which time DUNO had returned to the Eerste Klasse.

== Later career ==
After retiring as a player, Jansen trained as a physiotherapist and joined the staff of De Graafschap, his first professional club. Ahead of the 2025–26 season he was appointed performance coach of the club's first team.

== Honours ==
De Graafschap

- Eerste Divisie: 2009–10

DUNO

- Eerste Klasse Saturday C – South: 2017–18
