= VV WNC =

Association football club in Waardenburg, Netherlands

WNC
- Full name: Voetbalvereniging Waardenburg Neerijnen Combinatie
- Short name: WNC
- Founded: 1 September 1950; 74 years ago
- Ground: Sportpark De Korte Woerden, Waardenburg, Netherlands
- Chairman: Vacant
- Manager: Cor Prein
- League: Eerste Klasse
- 2022–23: Saturday Vierde Divisie A, 14th of 16 (relegated after play-offs)
colours

Voetbalvereniging Waardenburg Neerijnen Combinatie (VV WNC) is a football club from Waardenburg, Netherlands. Its home ground is Sportpark De Korte Woerden, located near and visible from the A2 motorway.

== History ==
WNC was founded on 1 September 1950.

=== 21st century ===
In 2014, through playoffs, the club promoted for the first time to the Eerste Klasse. In the celebrations, 20 members of the club were injured, when a moving trailer rolled over.

In 2022, WNC promoted to the Vierde Divisie, also through playoffs. In 2023, after just one season in the Vierde Divisie, WNC relegated to the Eerste Klasse through the playoffs. On 21 October 2023, WNC threw Vierde-Divisie-side ASWH out of the KNVB regional cup, after beating it 5–6 in penalties. The game and extension had ended in a 1–1 draw.

== Head coach ==
- Jeffrey Kooistra (2012–2014)
- Cor Prein (2014–)
