= VV Heino =

Association football club in Heino, Netherlands

- Full name: Voetbalvereniging Heino
- Founded: 7 July 1969; 56 years ago
- Ground: Sportpark De Kampen; Heino, Netherlands
- Capacity: 2,500
- Chairman: Arjen Stegeman
- Manager: Martijn de Vogel
- League: Vierde Divisie
- 2022–23: Sunday Vierde Divisie A, 10th of 16
- Website: https://www.vvheino.nl/
colors

Voetbalvereniging Heino is a football club based in Heino, Netherlands. It was founded on 7 July 1969, from a merger of SC Heino and HEVO. Since 2022 it plays in the Vierde Divisie for the first time in its history (when it promoted still known as Hoofdklasse).
