= VV SJC =

Dutch football club

- Full name: Voetbalvereniging Sint Jeroen's Club
- Founded: 26 September 1920
- Ground: Gemeentelijk Sportpark SJC, Noordwijk
- League: Vierde Divisie
- 2022–23: Sunday Vierde Divisie A, 6th of 16
- Website: http://www.vvsjc.nl/
Home colours

VV SJC is a football club from Noordwijk, Netherlands. VV SJC plays in the 2023–24 Sunday Vierde Divisie A.

In the 2021–22 season, VV SJC qualified for the promotion playoffs, but lost 7–0 on aggregate in the first round vs. OJC Rosmalen.
