= VV Spijkenisse =

Association football club in Spijkenisse, Netherlands

- Full name: Voetbalvereniging Spijkenisse
- Founded: 1 June 1946; 80 years ago
- Ground: Sportpark Jaap Riedijk, Spijkenisse
- Capacity: 1,200
- Chairman: Arno de Man
- Manager: Peter Wubben
- League: Eerste Klasse
- 2022–23: Saturday Vierde Divisie A, 13th of 16 (relegated after play-offs)
- Website: www.vvspijkenisse.nl
Home colours	Away colours

Voetbalvereniging Spijkenisse is a football club from Spijkenisse, Netherlands. In 2017–18, VV Spijkenisse played its sole season in the Saturday Derde Divisie. Since 2023, it plays in the Eerste Klasse, after relegating from the Vierde Divisie. The club is noted for its youth academy, having trained players such as George Boateng, Ellery Cairo, Romano Denneboom and Miquel Nelom.

== History ==
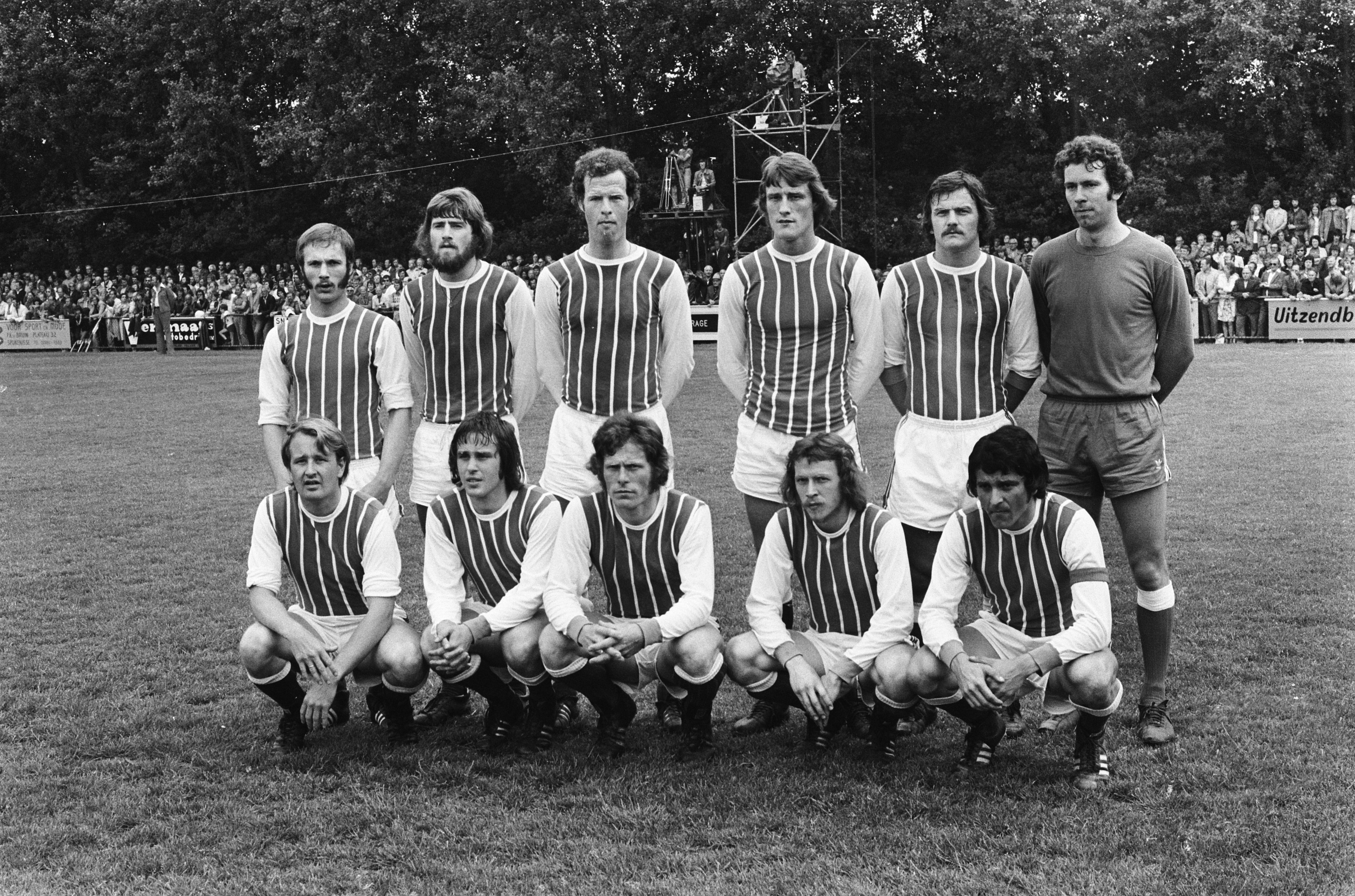
The championship team of 1975

VV Spijkenisse became champions of the Saturday amateurs in 1975 and then became overall amateur champion by beating the Sunday champion VV Emmen 2–4 away and 1–0 at home. In 2014, Spijkenisse won the championship of the Eerste Klasse C, which meant that the club forced promotion to the Hoofdklasse for the first time since the 2002–03 season. In the 2014–15 season, they won a period title and alongside Quick Boys and RVVH, they competed for play-offs for promotion to the Topklasse, but this was not realised. In the 2016–17 season, Spijkenisse became champion of the Dutch Hoofdklasse and promoted to the Derde Divisie. A year later, however, they lost in the relegation play-offs to HSV Hoek, which meant that the club suffered relegation to the Hoofdklasse.
