= NSC Nijkerk =

Football club from Nijkerk in Gelderland, Netherlands

- Full name: Nijkerker Sport Club
- Founded: 1 January 1933
- Ground: Sportpark De Burcht, Nijkerk
- League: Hoofdklasse Saturday B (2019–20)
- Website: http://www.nsc-nijkerk.nl/
Home colours

NSC Nijkerk is a football club from Nijkerk in Gelderland, Netherlands. NSC Nijkerk plays in the 2017–18 Saturday Hoofdklasse B.
