= VV Eemdijk =

Association football club in Bunschoten-Spakenburg, Netherlands

Eemdijk
- Full name: Voetbalvereniging Eemdijk
- Founded: 21 June 1979; 46 years ago
- Ground: De Vinken, Bunschoten-Spakenburg
- Chairman: Menno Veldhuizen
- Manager: Willem Romp
- League: Derde Divisie
- 2024–25: Derde Divisie A, 10th of 18
- Website: http://www.vveemdijk.nl/
Home colours

Voetbalvereniging Eemdijk is a football club based in Bunschoten-Spakenburg, Netherlands. They are currently members of the Derde Divisie, the fourth tier of the Dutch football league system, after reaching promotion from the 2022–23 Vierde Divisie. They play their home matches at De Vinken.

== History ==
VV Eemdijk played from 2015 through 2018 in the Saturday Hoofdklasse. In 2018, Eemdijk were promoted to the Derde Klasse. Eemdijk held only one season after in the Derde which it relegated back to the Hoofdklasse through the playoffs.

In the 2021–22 season, Eemdijk qualified for the promotion playoffs, where they played VVOG in the first round. After a 2–2 draw in the first leg, Eemdijk led 2–0 (4–2 on aggregate) with less than 20 minutes left, but conceded 3 goals in the span of 18 minutes, including an 89th-minute equalizer and a 92nd-minute winner. They ended up losing 5–4 on aggregate.

Eemdijk reached the second round of the 2024–25 KNVB Cup, losing 6–1 at home in the second round.

== Honours ==
- Vierde Divisie

Saturday B Champions (1): 2022–23
