= SV Orion =

Dutch football club

- Full name: Sportvereniging Orion
- Founded: September 19, 1938; 88 years ago
- Ground: Sportpark Mariënbosch, Nijmegen
- Capacity: 1,500
- League: Vierde Divisie – Group C
- 2023–24: Vierde Divisie – Group C, 10th of 16
- Website: http://www.svorion.nl//
Home colours

SV Orion is a Dutch amateur football club from the city of Nijmegen, founded on 19 September 1938. The first team of the club competes in the Vierde Divisie, the fifth tier of Dutch football. The club's home ground is the Sportpark Mariënbosch.
