= SDO Bussum =

Dutch football club

- Full name: Rooms Katholieke Voetbalvereniging Samenspel Doet Overwinnen
- Founded: 7 November 1917
- Ground: Sportpark De Kuil, Bussum
- League: Hoofdklasse Sunday A (2019–20)
- Website: http://www.sdobussum.nl/
Home colours

SDO Bussum is a football club from Bussum, Netherlands. SDO Bussum plays in the 2017–18 Sunday Hoofdklasse A.

== Famous former players ==
- Youri Mulder
- Melvin Platje
- Silvester van der Water
