= SV Poortugaal =

Association football club in Poortugaal, Netherlands

- Full name: Sportvereniging Poortugaal
- Founded: 1 July 2018; 7 years ago
- Ground: Sportpark Polder Albrandswaard; Poortugaal, Netherlands
- Capacity: 1,000
- Chairman: Peter Roest
- Manager: Oscar Biesheuvel
- League: Derde Divisie
- 2025–26: Vierde Divisie B, 1st of 16 (promoted)
Home colours

Sportvereniging Poortugaal, commonly known as SV Poortugaal, is a Dutch football club based in Poortugaal, South Holland. Founded in 2018 through a merger between PSV Poortugaal and VV Oude Maas, the club competes in the Derde Divisie, the fourth tier of the Dutch football league system.

Its predecessor clubs date back to 1927 and 1947 respectively and were long active in regional amateur competitions. The club plays its home matches at Sportpark Polder Albrandswaard and traditionally wears red and black.

== History ==
=== PSV Poortugaal ===
The Poortugaalse Sport Vereniging Poortugaal was founded on 20 April 1927. It played at Sportpark Polder Albrandswaard.

Dutch female soccer international and coach Hesterine de Reus played during her youth in PSV Poortugaal.

In 2016–17, its first squads played in the Sunday Eerste Klasse and in the Saturday Vierde Klasse. In 2017–18 the first squads continue in the same leagues. Starting 2017 coach of the Sunday squad was Jack van den Berg, who coached the Saturday Derde Divisie squad ASWH alongside.

In October 2017 the club decided that the first squad would play starting summer 2017 in the Saturday competition. Subsequently, the club also decided to merge with VV Oude Maas. Henk Dirven was selected to replace Jack van den Berg, who switched for Tweede Divisie-side VV Katwijk.

=== VV Oude Maas ===
Voetbalvereniging Oude Maas was founded on 16 May 1947. It played at Sportpark Polder Albrandswaard.

In 2014 VV Oude Maas played in the first round of the National Dutch KNVB Cup, losing 1–3 to the Bergen op Zoom side SV DOSKO. Since 2015 the first team plays in the Eerste Klasse. In 2016 Roël Liefden became coach of the first squad, replacing Warry van Wattum. In the summer of 2018 it merged with PSV Poortugaal.

=== SV Poortugaal ===
SV Poortugaal was formed in 2018 as a merger of PSV Poortugaal and VV Oude Maas. Its first squad started in the Eerste Klasse and promoted to the Hoofdklasse in 2020.
