= VV Rijsoord =

Football club in Ridderkerk, Netherlands

- Full name: Voetbalvereniging Rijsoord
- Nickname: Kraaien (Crows)
- Founded: 15 May 1924
- Ground: Sportpark Rijsoord, Ridderkerk
- League: Tweede Klasse
- 2022–23: Saturday Eerste Klasse C, 13th of 14 (relegated)
- Website: http://www.vv-rijsoord.nl/
Home colours

Voetbalvereniging Rijsoord is a football club based in Ridderkerk, South Holland, Netherlands. Currently members of the Tweede Klasse, the seventh tier of the Dutch football league system, the club was established in 1924. The club's colours are blue and white.

== History ==
In 1990 the Rijsoord women won the national championship soccer.

The male squad participated in the national KNVB Cup in 2007–2008. It relegated from Hoofdklasse to the Eerste Klasse in 2018, immediately securing a section championship and bouncing back to the Hoofdklasse. In 2020 it started its first consecutive season in the Hoofdklasse.

== Associated people ==
- Hesterine de Reus – player and coach
