= RKAVV =

Association football club in Leidschendam, Netherlands

- Full name: Rooms-Katholieke Aloysius Voetbalvereniging
- Founded: 10 January 1922; 103 years ago
- Ground: Spartpark de Kastelenring, Leidschendam
- Chairman: Henry Steffens
- Manager: Peter Klomp
- League: Vierde Divisie
- 2022–23: Sunday Vierde Divisie A, 2nd of 16
- Website: www.rkavv.nl
Home colours

Rooms-Katholieke Aloysius Voetbalvereniging, known as RKAVV, is a football club based in Leidschendam, Netherlands. Currently member of the Vierde Divisie, the fifth tier of the Dutch football league system, it plays home matches at Kastelenring. The club's colours are red and white.

Edwin Vurens played for RKAVV. He is the only RKAVV player to have made an appearance for the Netherlands national football team.
