= HZVV =

Dutch football club

- Full name: Hoogeveense Zaterdag Voetbal Vereniging
- Founded: 5 December 1929; 95 years ago
- Ground: Sportvelden Bentinckspark, Hoogeveen
- Chairman: Henk de Jong
- Manager: Bram Freie
- League: Eerste Klasse
- 2022–23: Saturday Vierde Divisie B, 16th of 16 (relegated)
- Website: http://www.hzvv.nl/
Home colours

Hoogeveense Zaterdag Voetbal Vereniging, commonly known as HZVV, is a Dutch association football club from Hoogeveen.
