= AZSV =

Association football club in Aalten, Netherlands

- Full name: Aaltense Zaterdag Sport Vereniging
- Founded: June 5, 1948; 76 years ago
- Ground: Sportpark Villekamp; Aalten
- Chairman: Gerben Houwers
- Manager: Martijn Beltman
- League: Vierde Divisie
- 2022–23: Saturday Vierde Divisie B, 4th of 16

AZSV is an amateur football club from Aalten, Netherlands. It was formed on 5 June 1948 and it plays home games at "Sportpark Villekamp". It plays in red jerseys with white shorts and white socks.

== History ==
In the 2012/2013 season it became champion, winning the Eerste Klasse D in Dutch amateur football. For the 2013/2014 it will be playing in the Hoofdklasse C. AZSV has produced a few former players and managers in professional football. Eddie Pasveer, Jurgen Wevers and Andries Ulderink were all involved with AZSV. AZSV has played a few friendly matches with professional football clubs. In 2011 it played against Ajax and lost 11–0. In 2012 AZSV played a friendly match versus PSV and also lost 11–0. On 29 June 2013 AZSV played a friendly match against FC Twente and lost 10–0. AZSV has a strong connection with De Graafschap. Ruud Kempers, Freek Mulder, Sven Spekking, Niek te Veluwe, Jonathan Goosen, Jan Willem Stronks and Carlos Dos Santos all played in its youth or in the first team.
