= SC Silvolde =

Dutch football club

- Full name: Sportclub Silvolde
- Founded: 1 May 1915
- Ground: Sportpark De Munsterman, Silvolde
- League: Hoofdklasse Sunday A (2019–20)
- Website: http://www.sportclubsilvolde.nl/
Home colours

SC Silvolde is a football club from Silvolde, Netherlands. SC Silvolde plays in the 2017–18 Sunday Hoofdklasse A.
