= MVV Alcides =

Dutch football club

Alcides
- Full name: Meppeler Voetbalvereniging Alcides
- Founded: 14 November 1907
- Ground: Sportpark Ezinge; Meppel
- League: Eerste Klasse
- 2022–23: Sunday Vierde Divisie A, 15 of 16 (relegated)
| Home colours | Away colours |

Meppeler Voetbalvereniging Alcides is a football club from Meppel, Netherlands. The club, founded in 1907, is currently playing in the Eerste Klasse, the third highest tier of amateur football in the Netherlands.

== History ==
During its first 100 years the club hovered mostly between the Tweede Klasse and Eerste Klasse. At the beginning of its second century, it hovers between the Hoofdklasse and Eerste Klasse.
