= VV Buitenpost =

Dutch football club

Buitenpost
- Full name: Voetbalvereniging Buitenpost
- Nickname: Blauwkes
- Founded: 1 May 1942; 83 years ago
- Ground: De Swadde, Buitenpost
- Capacity: 1,500
- Chairman: Paul Olijve
- Manager: Kevin Waalderbos
- League: Vierde Divisie
- 2022–23: Saturday Vierde Divisie B, 12th of 16
- Website: https://vvbuitenpost.nl/
Home colours

Voetbalvereniging Buitenpost is a Dutch association football club from Buitenpost, Friesland. They are currently members of the Vierde Divisie, the fifth tier of the Dutch football league system, and play their home matches at the 1,500-capacity home ground De Swadde.

== History ==
VV Buitenpost was founded on 1 May 1942.

They competed in the 2017–18 KNVB Cup. In the first preliminary round they won 4–3 against ZSV. In the second preliminary round they lost 0–2 against Genemuiden.
