= Moerse Boys =

Dutch football club

Voetbal Vereniging Moerse Boys is an association football club from Zundert, Netherlands. It was founded on 13 November 1943. Its home ground is Sportpark De Akkermolen in Klein Zundert. In 2019 the first male squad of Moerse Boys made it for the first time to the Hoofdklasse.
