= Flevo Boys =

Dutch football club

- Full name: Voetbalvereniging Flevo Boys Emmeloord
- Founded: 1 May 1957; 67 years ago
- Ground: Sportpark Ervenbos; Emmeloord, Netherlands
- Capacity: 3,000
- Chairman: Hugo Jongejan
- Manager: Arjen Postma
- League: Eerste Klasse
- 2022–23: Saturday Vierde Divisie B, 13th of 16 (relegated via play-offs)
| Home colours | Away colours |

Flevo Boys is a Dutch association football club from Emmeloord. It plays home matches at the 3,000-capacity home ground Sportpark Ervenbos.

== Honours ==
Vierde klasse
Winners 1969
Derde klasse
Winners 1971
Tweede klasse
Winners 1982, 1993
Districtsbeker Oost
Winners 1991
Districtsbeker Noord
Winners 2018
