= RKSV Minor =

Dutch football club

The Rooms Katholieke Voetbalvereniging Minor is a Dutch association football club from Nuth. Its colors are green-white. Home grounds are at Sportpark De Kollenberg. Its prime team plays in the Hoofdklasse since 2018.

== History ==
The club was founded on June 27, 1918, at the Vaesrader Voetbal Club (VVC). In 1922 the name was changed to Minor. Minor reached a high in 1966 when, unbeaten over an entire football season, took a championship in the Eerste Klasse, at the time the highest amateur league.

In 2018, it promoted to the Hoofdklasse after a second Eerste Klasse championship. In 2019, it held on to a place in the Hoofdklasse, finishing the season in 10th position. Also in 2019 it lost 4-2 through penalties in the semifinals for the KNVB South II Cup, against SV TOP, after the game had ended in a 1–1 draw.
