= RKVV Velsen =

Dutch football club

Rooms-Katholieke Voetbalvereniging Velsen is an association football club from Driehuis in the municipality of Velsen, Netherlands. The club was founded on 14 Augustus 1922 as VV Santpoort. This name was later changed. RKVV Velsen's home grounds are at Sportpark Driehuis.

== History ==
The club's male Sunday first squad reached the Hoofdklasse for the first time in 2019, after winning an Eerste Klasse championship. The team was coached by Maarten Haar. Both the female and male first teams have played multiple times in the national cup.
