= SV AWC =

Dutch football club

- Full name: Sportvereniging Alverna Wijchen Combinatie
- Founded: 28 April 1932
- Ground: Sportpark De Wijchert, Wijchen
- Capacity: 700
- League: Vierde Divisie
- 2023–24: Derde Divisie B, 15th of 18 (relegated via play-offs)
- Website: http://www.awcwijchen.nl/
Home colours

Sportvereniging Alverna Wijchen Combinatie is a football club from Wijchen, Netherlands. AWC play in the Vierde Divisie.

== History ==
SV AWC was founded on 28 April 1932.

Twice they competed in the KNVB Cup, but never made it past the first round. The first time in the 1956–57 KNVB Cup, a 6–2 loss against Vitesse, and most recent in the 1983–84 KNVB Cup, a 1–0 loss against Quick Boys.

After finishing 15th in the 2023–24 Derde Divisie B, SV AWC were forced to play in the relegation playoffs. In the first round, they lost to VV Smitshoek 3–1 on aggregate and were relegated to the fifth-tier Vierde Divisie.
