= RKZVC =

Dutch football club

The Rooms-Katholieke Zieuwentse Voetbalclub, usually known as RKZVC, is a Dutch association football club from Zieuwent. It was founded on 28 June 1945. RKZVC's main male squad plays in the Hoofdklasse since 2018. The club's home ground is De Greune Weide.

== History ==
While founded in 1945, RKZVC plays in major KNVB leagues only since 1971. Until 1983 it played in Vierde Klasse C, where it usually ended in a top spot. In 1983 it won a championship and promoted to Derde Klasse C. This first stint in the Derde lasted 6 years, after which generally weaker years in Vierde Klasse C followed.

In 2008 RKZVC hit a bottom when it relegated to the Vijfde Klasse. From here luck changed. It immediately won a Vijfde Klasse championship (2008–2009). Followed by gradually improving performance in the Vierde Klasse (2009–11). In 2011 RKZVC finally made it back to the Derde Klasse but relegated a year later.

Immediately, in 2013 RKZVC won the Vierde Klasse championship that brought it to the Derde. In 2016 it won a Derde Klasse championship, it 2017 that of a Tweede Klasse, and 2018 that of an Eerste Klasse. RKZVC's exceptional ascent, winning coach Laurens Knippenborg the Rinus Michels Award, was stopped for now in the Hoofdklasse where RKZVC "just" held on in 2019. While leading the league after several games, it finished in the "honorable" 4th place and did not make it into the promotion playoff (unlike the numbers 3 and 5, who took period championships).
