= VV Emmen =

Dutch football club

Voetbal Vereniging Emmen (abbreviated to VV Emmen) is an association football club from Emmen, Netherlands. It was founded on 21 August 1925 as the Noordbarge Emmen Combinatie. In 1927 it changed to its current name. The grounds of the team is named De Meerdijk. In 1919 its first male squad returned to Hoofdklasse, after its fourth championship in the Eerste Klasse.

== History ==
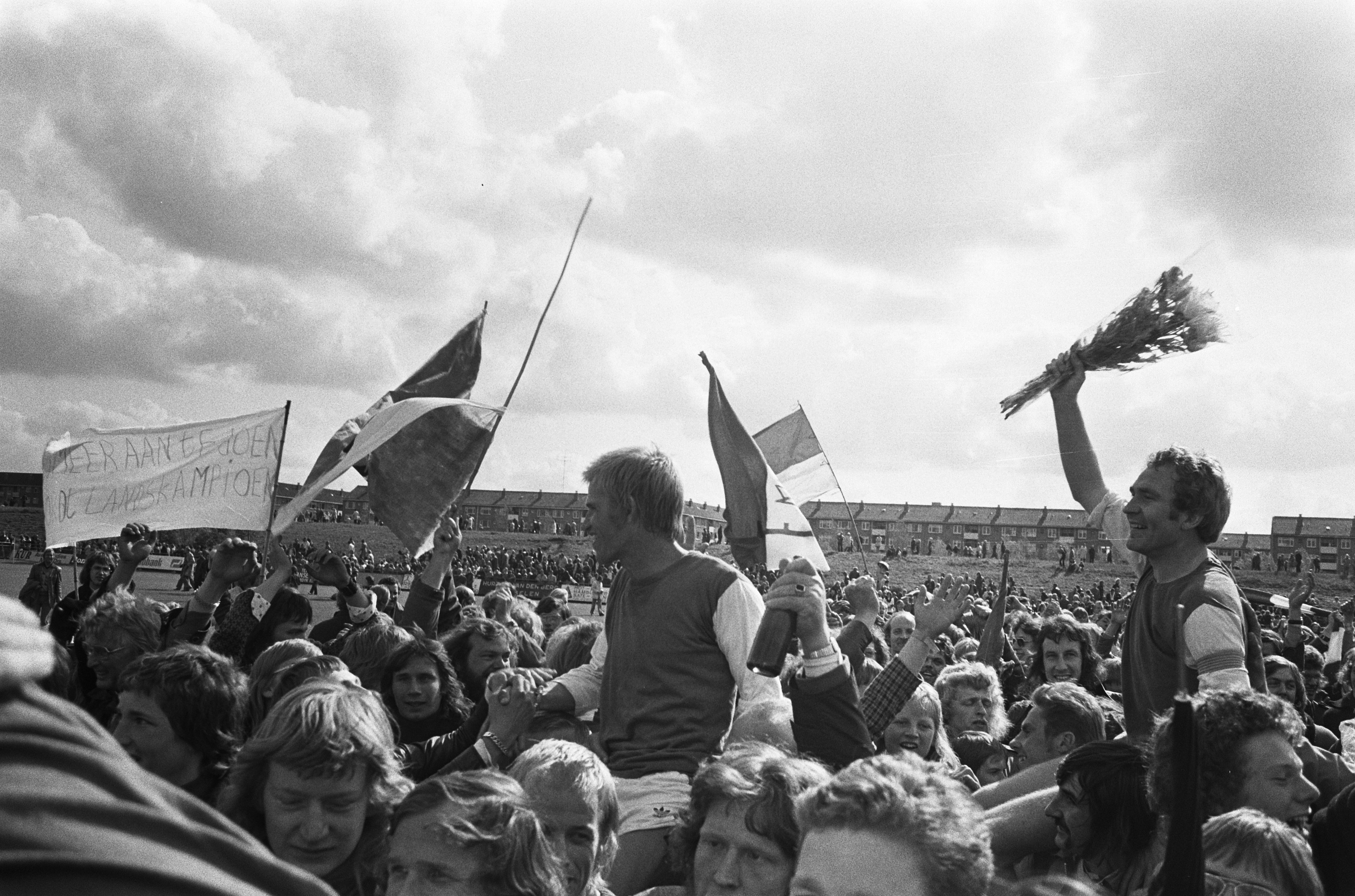
Celebrating the championship in 1975

The first championship held by VV Emmen was in 1930, winning the league of the Drenthe Football Association.

In 1975, VV Emmen won a championship in the Hoofdklasse and the National Sunday Amateurs championship.

== Former players ==
- Jan van Beveren
- Kimberly Heijne
- Jan Quispel
- Kjell Scherpen
