= Longa '30 =

Dutch football club

SV Longa'30 (short for Sportvereniging Lichamelijke Ontspanning Na Gedane Arbeid 1930) is an association football club from Lichtenvoorde, Netherlands. Its home ground is Sportpark De Treffer. In 2019–2010 the first male squad of Longa plays in the Hoofdklasse Sunday after taking the Sunday East Championship of the Eerste Klasse.

== History ==
De club was founded on 1 April 1930. It had 24 members at the time. It started with the colors black and white. Later the colors were changed to orange and white and eventually a white V was added to the orange shirts.

In 1940, Longa '30 had about 50 members, in 1950 about 500. Longa had its grounds at a location where later the sports hall of Lichtenvoorde was built. In 1949, Longa moved to the local Raadhuisstraat.

Longa won section championships in the Vierde Klasse in 1974, in the Derde Klasse in 1980, 1992, 2002, and 2009, and in the Tweede Klasse in 1982 and 1993.

In 2011 it became champion of the Eerste Klasse Sunday East section. As a result, Longa was first of the Achterhoek region to reach the Hoofdklasse. After three seasons it relegated back to the Eerste Klasse. In 2019 it won another championship in the Eerste Klasse 1E, after beating the other first place contender, SC Bemmel, 1–2. This Eerste Klasse championship brought Longa back to the Hoofdklasse.

== Notable former players ==
- Sander Boschker
- Dave Bus
- Hidde Jurjus
- Moisa van Koot
