= 2016–17 in Dutch football =

Football in Netherlands
- Season: 2016–17

Men's football
- Eredivisie: Feyenoord
- Eerste Divisie: VVV-Venlo
- KNVB Cup: Vitesse
- Johan Cruyff Shield: PSV Eindhoven

The 2016–17 season was the 128th season of competitive football in the Netherlands.

== Pre-season ==
League	Promoted to league	Relegated from league
Eredivisie	Sparta Rotterdam; Go Ahead Eagles	De Graafschap; Cambuur
Eerste Divisie	-	-
Topklasse	Excelsior Maassluis; De Dijk; Lisse; Rijnsburgse Boys	RVVH; Sneek Wit Zwart
Hoofdklasse	ODIN '59; Huizen; Quick Boys; ASWH; Rijnvogels; Harkemase Boys; VVOG; Westlandia; ASV De Dijk; Oostzaan; Dongen; UDI '19; Juliana '31; Be Quick 1887; Quick '20	Bennekom; SVL; LRC; VVA '71; XerxesDZB; Heinenoord; Sportlust '46; Deltasport; SVZW; HZVV; DOS '37; Drachtster Boys; EDO; Nieuwerkerk; Nieuw Utrecht; Leonidas; Baronie; SV TOP; Rohda Raalte; Achilles 1894; Rigtersbleek; Alcides
Eerste Klasse	Opheusden; Argon; Smitshoek; Barneveld; ONG; Hoogland; Ido's FC; Nuenen; Chevremont; Woezik; Heerenveen	

== Standings ==
Pos	Team	Pld	W	D	L	GF	GA	GD	Pts	Qualification or relegation
1	Feyenoord (C)	34	26	4	4	86	25	+61	82	Qualification to Champions League group stage
2	Ajax	34	25	6	3	79	23	+56	81	Qualification to Champions League third qualifying round
3	PSV Eindhoven	34	22	10	2	68	23	+45	76	Qualification to Europa League third qualifying round
4	Utrecht (O)	34	18	8	8	54	38	+16	62	Qualification to European competition play-offs (Note: Four teams played for a spot in the Europa League second qualifying round.)
5	Vitesse	34	15	6	13	51	40	+11	51	Qualification to Europa League group stage (Note: Vitesse qualified for the Europa League group stage by winning the 2016–17 KNVB Cup.)
6	AZ	34	12	13	9	56	52	+4	49	Qualification to European competition play-offs
7	Twente (Note: Twente was excluded from European football for 3 years on 15 December 2015.)	34	12	9	13	48	50	−2	45	
8	Groningen	34	10	13	11	55	51	+4	43	Qualification to European competition play-offs
9	Heerenveen	34	12	7	15	54	53	+1	43	Qualification to European competition play-offs
10	Heracles Almelo	34	12	7	15	53	55	−2	43	
11	ADO Den Haag	34	11	5	18	37	59	−22	38	
12	Excelsior	34	9	10	15	43	60	−17	37	
13	Willem II	34	9	9	16	29	44	−15	36	
14	PEC Zwolle	34	9	8	17	39	67	−28	35	
15	Sparta Rotterdam	34	9	7	18	42	61	−19	34	
16	NEC (R)	34	9	7	18	32	59	−27	34	Qualification to Relegation play-offs
17	Roda JC Kerkrade (O)	34	7	12	15	26	51	−25	33	Qualification to Relegation play-offs
18	Go Ahead Eagles (R)	34	6	5	23	32	73	−41	23	Relegation to Eerste Divisie

Source: NUsport (in Dutch), Soccerway
Rules for classification: 1) Points; 2) Goal difference; 3) Goals scored; 4) Play-off (only for deciding champion and relegation); 5) Head-to-head points; 6) Head-to-head goal difference; 7) Head-to-head away goals scored; 8) Draw. (Note: Criteria 5-8 is only used if deciding Europa League play-off places)
(C) Champions; (O) Play-off winners; (R) Relegated

== Standings ==
Pos	Team	Pld	W	D	L	GF	GA	GD	Pts	Promotion, qualification or relegation
1	VVV-Venlo (C, P)	38	25	5	8	75	35	+40	80	Promotion to the Eredivisie
2	Jong Ajax (Note: Reserves teams cannot be promoted and cannot participate in the promotion play-offs.)	38	23	7	8	93	54	+39	76	
3	Cambuur	38	22	5	11	78	42	+36	71	Qualification to promotion play-offs Second round (Note: Ten teams, two from the Eredivisie and eight from the Eerste Divisie, play for two spots in the 2017–18 Eredivisie, the remaining eight teams play in the 2017–18 Eerste Divisie. The season is subdivided in periods consisting of games 1–9, 10–18, 19–27 and 28–36. The top finisher in each period (that has not won a previous period) is a period winner and qualifies for the promotion play-offs first round even if they finish the season outside of the top nine.)
4	Jong PSV	38	20	9	9	66	35	+31	69	
5	NAC Breda (O, P)	38	19	7	12	65	50	+15	64	Qualification to promotion play-offs Second round
6	Volendam	38	17	11	10	63	44	+19	62	Qualification to promotion play-offs Second round
7	MVV	38	15	14	9	55	45	+10	59	Qualification to promotion play-offs Second round
8	Almere City	38	17	8	13	74	66	+8	59	Qualification to promotion play-offs First round
9	Emmen	38	14	13	11	50	40	+10	55	Qualification to promotion play-offs First round
10	RKC Waalwijk	38	15	9	14	62	70	−8	54	Qualification to promotion play-offs First round
11	Eindhoven	38	15	8	15	64	71	−7	53	
12	De Graafschap	38	15	5	18	70	63	+7	50	
13	Helmond Sport	38	14	7	17	51	67	−16	49	Qualification to promotion play-offs First round
14	Den Bosch	38	12	9	17	48	67	−19	45	
15	Oss	38	12	5	21	67	95	−28	41	
16	Telstar	38	10	10	18	46	64	−18	40	
17	Fortuna Sittard (Note: Fortuna Sittard were deducted three points for an outstanding bill owed to KNVB. On 10 April 2017 Fortuna Sittard were deducted another 6 points for not meeting financial targets.)	38	13	9	16	54	67	−13	39	
18	Jong FC Utrecht	38	10	7	21	50	71	−21	37	
19	Dordrecht	38	5	9	24	42	72	−30	24	
20	Achilles '29 (Note: Achilles '29 were deducted three points for repeatedly not meeting financial requirements.) (R)	38	5	7	26	37	92	−55	19	Relegation to the Tweede Divisie

Source: NUsport (in Dutch), Soccerway
Rules for classification: 1) points; 2) goal difference; 3) number of goals scored
(C) Champions; (O) Play-off winners; (P) Promoted; (R) Relegated

== Standings ==
Pos	Team	Pld	W	D	L	GF	GA	GD	Pts	Promotion, qualification or relegation
1	Jong AZ (C, P)	34	23	7	4	85	29	+56	76	Promotion to Eerste Divisie
2	Kozakken Boys	34	17	6	11	70	54	+16	57	
3	Katwijk	34	15	10	9	52	42	+10	55	
4	De Treffers	34	14	12	8	70	55	+15	54	
5	Excelsior Maassluis	34	13	10	11	52	43	+9	49	
6	Lienden	34	13	9	12	52	48	+4	48	
7	Jong Sparta	34	12	11	11	74	67	+7	47	
8	Barendrecht	34	12	11	11	57	57	0	47	
9	VVSB	34	12	11	11	62	64	−2	47	
10	GVVV	34	13	8	13	51	63	−12	47	
11	AFC (Note: AFC were deducted 1 point for not having the required number of players with a contract.)	34	13	7	14	59	63	−4	45	
12	TEC	34	13	6	15	53	67	−14	45	
13	Koninklijke HFC	34	11	9	14	49	50	−1	42	
14	HHC	34	10	11	13	41	53	−12	41	
15	UNA (R)	34	12	5	17	57	79	−22	41	Qualification to relegation play-offs
16	Spakenburg (R)	34	9	10	15	61	66	−5	37	Qualification to relegation play-offs
17	Jong Vitesse (Note: Jong Vitesse were deducted three points for having 3 players from the first team on the field at the same time, while the rules only allow 2 players from the first team on the field at the same time.) (R)	34	11	4	19	66	79	−13	34	Relegation to Derde Divisie
18	Jong Twente (R)	34	6	7	21	32	64	−32	25	Relegation to Derde Divisie

Rules for classification: 1) Points; 2) Goal difference; 3) Goals scored
(C) Champions; (P) Promoted; (R) Relegated

=== Derde Divisie ===
==== Saturday League ====
Pos	Team	Pld	W	D	L	GF	GA	GD	Pts	Qualification or relegation
1	IJsselmeervogels (C, P)	34	21	7	6	74	36	+38	70	Promotion to Tweede Divisie
2	Lisse (Q, O, P)	34	20	5	9	55	38	+17	65	Qualification to promotion play-offs
3	Rijnsburgse Boys (Q, O, P)	34	17	10	7	84	62	+22	61	Qualification to promotion play-offs
4	ASWH	34	17	7	10	64	53	+11	58	
5	Scheveningen	34	16	8	10	54	48	+6	56	
6	Jong Volendam	34	16	8	10	60	56	+4	56	
7	DVS '33	34	13	9	12	54	49	+5	48	
8	Jong Groningen	34	11	12	11	48	46	+2	45	
9	Harkemase Boys (Note: Harkemase Boys and ODIN '59 were deducted one point for not having the required number of players with a contract.) (Q)	34	13	7	14	55	60	−5	45	Qualification to promotion play-offs
10	VVOG	34	12	8	14	49	55	−6	44	
11	Quick Boys	34	11	10	13	47	54	−7	43	
12	Capelle	34	11	8	15	42	52	−10	41	
13	ONS Sneek	34	10	10	14	51	60	−9	40	
14	Jong Almere City (Note: Jong Almere were deducted one point for having three players from the first team on the field at the same time, while the rules only allow two players from the first team on the field at the same time.)	34	11	6	17	63	61	+2	38	
15	ODIN '59 (Q)	34	10	6	18	58	63	−5	35	Qualification to relegation play-offs
16	SteDoCo (Q, R)	34	9	8	17	46	69	−23	35	Qualification to relegation play-offs
17	Huizen (R)	34	9	6	19	38	57	−19	33	Relegation to Hoofdklasse
18	Rijnvogels (R)	34	10	3	21	55	78	−23	33	Relegation to Hoofdklasse

Source: Tweededivisie.org (in Dutch)
(C) Champions; (O) Play-off winners; (P) Promoted; (Q) Qualified for the phase indicated; (R) Relegated

==== Sunday League ====
Pos	Team	Pld	W	D	L	GF	GA	GD	Pts	Qualification or relegation
1	De Dijk (C, P)	34	27	2	5	91	42	+49	83	Promotion to Tweede Divisie
2	Westlandia (Note: RKVV Westlandia, VV Dongen, Quick '20, USV Hercules, Be Quick 1887, EVV, OJC Rosmalen, HBS Craeyenhout, Magreb '90, Juliana '31 and UDI '19 were deducted one point for not having the required number of players with a contract.) (Q)	34	23	6	5	101	47	+54	74	Qualification to promotion play-offs
3	Dongen (Q)	34	21	3	10	65	46	+19	65	Qualification to promotion play-offs
4	USV Hercules (Q)	34	18	7	9	64	48	+16	60	Qualification to promotion play-offs
5	Quick '20	34	16	7	11	67	57	+10	54	
6	Be Quick 1887	34	17	3	14	74	61	+13	53	
7	HSC '21	34	14	6	14	73	69	+4	48	
8	EVV	34	14	6	14	57	49	+8	47	
9	HBS Craeyenhout	34	15	2	17	55	62	−7	46	
10	OFC	34	12	8	14	53	62	−9	44	
11	JVC Cuijk	34	12	8	14	48	58	−10	44	
12	OJC Rosmalen	34	11	8	15	47	69	−22	40	
13	Jong De Graafschap	34	10	6	18	66	79	−13	36	
14	Magreb '90 (Note: Magreb '90 was deducted one point for not having the required number of players with a contract and an additional three points for failing to meet the license criteria in general.)	34	11	6	17	53	78	−25	35	
15	Juliana '31 (Q, R)	34	10	5	19	56	68	−12	34	Qualification to relegation play-offs
16	Jong Den Bosch (Q, R)	34	7	9	18	45	61	−16	30	Qualification to relegation play-offs
17	UDI '19 (R)	34	8	7	19	45	80	−35	30	Relegation to Hoofdklasse
18	Jong Achilles '29 (Note: Jong Achilles '29 was deducted one point for having one dispensation player too many on the team in the away match against Quick '20) (R)	34	7	7	20	58	82	−24	27	Relegation to Hoofdklasse

Source: Tweededivisie.org (in Dutch)
(C) Champions; (P) Promoted; (Q) Qualified for the phase indicated; (R) Relegated

=== Hoofdklasse ===
==== Saturday A League ====
Pos	Team	Pld	W	D	L	GF	GA	GD	Pts	Qualification or relegation
1	Spijkenisse (C, P)	28	17	5	6	62	35	+27	56	Promotion to 2017–18 Derde Divisie Saturday
2	Ter Leede (Note: Assigned as Third Period winner as highest ranked team at the end of the season.)	28	17	5	6	55	38	+17	56	Qualification for 2017–18 Derde Divisie play-offs
3	Noordwijk (Note: Winner of the Second Period (games 15-28).)	28	16	5	7	66	42	+24	53	Qualification for 2017–18 Derde Divisie play-offs
4	Achilles Veen (Note: Winner of the First Period (games 1-14).)	28	16	5	7	52	36	+16	53	Qualification for 2017–18 Derde Divisie play-offs
5	Swift	28	14	7	7	56	34	+22	49	
6	Ajax (amateurs)	28	14	3	11	50	47	+3	45	
7	Jodan Boys	28	11	8	9	52	39	+13	41	
8	Hoek	28	10	8	10	41	43	−2	38	
9	DFS	28	12	2	14	40	51	−11	38	
10	Argon	28	10	6	12	44	46	−2	36	
11	RVVH	28	9	6	13	45	50	−5	33	
12	Zwaluwen	28	7	9	12	43	56	−13	30	
13	Sliedrecht (R)	28	7	3	18	49	72	−23	24	Qualification to relegation play-offs
14	Smitshoek (O)	28	6	6	16	35	62	−27	24	Qualification to relegation play-offs
15	Breukelen (R)	28	2	6	20	29	68	−39	12	Relegation to 2017–18 Eerste Klasse
16	Haaglandia (Note: On August 24, 2016 the club filed for bankruptcy after losing a court case against the local council.)	1	0	0	1	2	3	−1	0	Withdrew following bankruptcy

(C) Champions; (O) Play-off winners; (P) Promoted; (R) Relegated

==== Saturday B League ====
Pos	Team	Pld	W	D	L	GF	GA	GD	Pts	Qualification or relegation
1	ACV (Note: Winner of the First (games 1-10) and Third Periods (games 21-30).) (C, P)	30	20	5	5	58	35	+23	65	Promotion to 2017–18 Derde Divisie Saturday
2	DOVO (Note: Winner of the Second Period (games 11-20).) (O, P)	30	18	6	6	62	31	+31	60	Qualification for 2017–18 Derde Divisie play-offs
3	Staphorst (Note: Substitute winner of the First Period.)	30	16	5	9	68	34	+34	53	Qualification for 2017–18 Derde Divisie play-offs
4	CSV Apeldoorn (Note: Substitute winner of the Third Period.)	30	15	6	9	61	48	+13	51	Qualification for 2017–18 Derde Divisie play-offs
5	Excelsior '31	30	13	7	10	67	56	+11	46	
6	Genemuiden	30	12	9	9	60	42	+18	45	
7	Sparta Nijkerk	30	12	9	9	53	48	+5	45	
8	SDC Putten	30	11	12	7	43	39	+4	45	
9	Eemdijk	30	12	6	12	58	61	−3	42	
10	AZSV	30	10	8	12	41	37	+4	38	
11	Urk	30	10	8	12	41	42	−1	38	
12	NSC	30	11	4	15	47	56	−9	37	
13	Flevo Boys (R)	30	10	5	15	47	56	−9	35	Qualification to relegation play-offs
14	Oranje Nassau (R)	30	10	2	18	42	69	−27	32	Qualification to relegation play-offs
15	SDV Barneveld (R)	30	6	7	17	33	57	−24	25	Relegation to 2017–18 Eerste Klasse
16	ASV Dronten (R)	30	2	5	23	27	97	−70	11	Relegation to 2017–18 Eerste Klasse

(C) Champions; (O) Play-off winners; (P) Promoted; (R) Relegated

==== Sunday A League ====
Pos	Team	Pld	W	D	L	GF	GA	GD	Pts	Qualification or relegation
1	ADO '20 (Note: Winner of the First (games 1-10) and Second Period (games 11-20).) (C, P)	30	19	7	4	82	41	+41	64	Promotion to 2017–18 Derde Divisie Sunday
2	Woezik (Note: Substitute Winner of the First Period.)	30	16	7	7	57	32	+25	55	Qualification for 2017–18 Derde Divisie play-offs
3	SJC (Note: Substitute winner of the Second Period.)	30	16	5	9	64	39	+25	53	Qualification for 2017–18 Derde Divisie play-offs
4	Hollandia	30	15	8	7	51	33	+18	53	
5	Silvolde	30	15	4	11	54	51	+3	49	
6	De Meern (Note: Winner of the Third Period (games 21-30).) (O, P)	30	13	6	11	70	55	+15	45	Qualification for 2017–18 Derde Divisie play-offs
7	Sneek Wit Zwart	30	11	8	11	65	52	+13	41	
8	SDO	30	9	13	8	42	45	−3	40	
9	VV Heerenveen	30	11	5	14	49	52	−3	38	
10	De Bataven	30	11	5	14	45	60	−15	38	
11	MSC	30	10	7	13	53	55	−2	37	
12	RKHVV	30	9	10	11	42	52	−10	37	
13	Alverna (R)	30	8	12	10	50	45	+5	36	Qualification to relegation play-offs
14	JOS Watergraafsmeer (R)	30	9	9	12	51	55	−4	36	Qualification to relegation play-offs
15	Hoogland (R)	30	8	9	13	42	56	−14	33	Relegation to 2017–18 Eerste Klasse
16	Dieze West (R)	30	1	3	26	28	122	−94	6	Relegation to 2017–18 Eerste Klasse

(C) Champions; (O) Play-off winners; (P) Promoted; (R) Relegated

==== Sunday B League ====
Pos	Team	Pld	W	D	L	GF	GA	GD	Pts	Qualification or relegation
1	Blauw Geel '38 (Note: Winner of the First Period (games 1-10).) (C, P)	30	19	8	3	76	36	+40	65	Promotion to 2017–18 Derde Divisie Sunday
2	Quick (H) (Note: Winner of the Third Period (games 21-30).) (O, P)	30	16	6	8	62	35	+27	54	Qualification for 2017–18 Derde Divisie play-offs
3	Oss '20 (Note: Winner of the Second Period (games 11-20).)	30	13	10	7	54	34	+20	49	Qualification for 2017–18 Derde Divisie play-offs
4	Vlissingen (Note: Substitute winner of the First Period.)	30	14	7	9	45	34	+11	49	Qualification for 2017–18 Derde Divisie play-offs
5	Halsteren	30	13	8	9	48	34	+14	47	
6	Nuenen	30	13	6	11	57	54	+3	45	
7	DHC Delft	30	12	8	10	55	50	+5	44	
8	Gemert	30	10	11	9	57	45	+12	41	
9	Groene Ster	30	11	4	15	40	50	−10	37	
10	IFC	30	10	5	15	46	55	−9	35	
11	RKAVV	30	9	8	13	35	48	−13	35	
12	EHC	30	10	5	15	33	52	−19	35	
13	DESO (R)	30	8	10	12	36	44	−8	34	Qualification to relegation play-offs
14	Gestel (R)	30	9	7	14	40	82	−42	34	Qualification to relegation play-offs
15	Chevremont (R)	30	9	6	15	53	59	−6	33	Relegation to 2017–18 Eerste Klasse
16	DOSKO (R)	30	8	3	19	36	61	−25	27	Relegation to 2017–18 Eerste Klasse

(C) Champions; (O) Play-off winners; (P) Promoted; (R) Relegated

=== Eredivisie (women) ===
Pos	Team	Pld	W	D	L	GF	GA	GD	Pts	Qualification or relegation
1	Ajax	21	17	3	1	49	11	+38	54	Qualification to Championship play-off
2	Twente	21	13	4	4	62	25	+37	43	Qualification to Championship play-off
3	PSV Eindhoven	21	12	3	6	56	26	+30	39	Qualification to Championship play-off
4	ADO	21	12	3	6	43	35	+8	39	Qualification to Championship play-off
5	Telstar	21	6	4	11	42	52	−10	22	Qualification to Placement play-off
6	Heerenveen	21	5	3	13	32	47	−15	18	Qualification to Placement play-off
7	Achilles '29	21	5	1	15	21	68	−47	16	Qualification to Placement play-off
8	Zwolle	21	2	3	16	24	65	−41	9	Qualification to Placement play-off

Source: soccerway.com
Rules for classification: 1) Points; 2) Goal difference; 3) Number of goals scored; 4) Head-to-head points; 5) Head-to-head goal difference; 6) Head-to-head away goals scored

=== Managerial changes ===
Team	Outgoing manager	Manner of departure	Date of vacancy	Position in table	Replaced by	Date of appointment
Groningen	(Netherlands) Erwin van de Looi	End of contract	1 July 2016	Pre-season	(Netherlands) Ernest Faber	1 July 2016
NEC	(Netherlands) Ernest Faber	Signed by Groningen	1 July 2016	Pre-season	(Germany) Peter Hyballa	1 July 2016
Heerenveen	(Netherlands) Foppe de Haan	End of contract	1 July 2016	Pre-season	(Netherlands) Jurgen Streppel	1 July 2016
Willem II	(Netherlands) Jurgen Streppel	Signed by Heerenveen	1 July 2016	Pre-season	(Netherlands) Erwin van de Looi	1 July 2016
Vitesse	(Netherlands) Rob Maas	Resigned	1 July 2016	Pre-season	(Netherlands) Henk Fraser	1 July 2016
Roda JC	(Bosnia and Herzegovina) Darije Kalezić	Sacked	1 July 2016	Pre-season	(Greece) Yannis Anastasiou	1 July 2016
Ajax	(Netherlands) Frank de Boer	Resigned	1 July 2016	Pre-season	(Netherlands) Peter Bosz	1 July 2016
Excelsior	(Netherlands) Alfons Groenendijk	Mutual consent	1 July 2016	Pre-season	(Netherlands) Mitchell van der Gaag	1 July 2016
ADO Den Haag	(Netherlands) Henk Fraser	Signed by Vitesse	1 July 2016	Pre-season	(Montenegro) Željko Petrović	1 July 2016
ADO Den Haag	(Montenegro) Željko Petrović	Mutual consent	7 February 2017	16th	(Netherlands) Alfons Groenendijk	8 February 2017
Go Ahead Eagles	(Netherlands) Hans de Koning	Sacked	22 March 2017	18th	(Netherlands) Robert Maaskant	25 March 2017
NEC	(Germany) Peter Hyballa	Sacked	24 April 2017	17th	(Netherlands) Ron de Groot	25 April 2017
Roda JC	(Greece) Yannis Anastasiou	Sacked	23 May 2017	17th	(Netherlands) Huub Stevens	23 May 2017

== KNVB Cup ==
=== Final ===
30 April 2017
18:00

AZ	0–2	Vitesse
	Report	Van Wolfswinkel 81', 88'

De Kuip, Rotterdam
Attendance: 46,105
Referee: Danny Makkelie

== National teams ==
=== Friendlies ===
1 September 2016	Netherlands	1 – 2	Greece	Eindhoven, Netherlands
20:45 UTC+2	Wijnaldum 14'		Mitroglou 29'; Gianniotas 74'	Stadium: Philips Stadion; Attendance: 36,128; Referee: Mete Kalkavan (Turkey)

9 November 2016	Netherlands	1 – 1	Belgium	Amsterdam, Netherlands
20:45 UTC+2	Klaassen 38' (pen.)		Carrasco 82'	Stadium: Amsterdam Arena; Attendance: 37,500; Referee: Szymon Marciniak (Poland)

28 March 2017	Netherlands	1 – 2	Italy	Amsterdam, Netherlands
20:45 UTC+2	Romagnoli 10' (o.g.)		Éder 11'; Bonucci 32'	Stadium: Amsterdam Arena; Attendance: 46,228; Referee: Jonas Eriksson (Sweden)

31 May 2017	Morocco	1 – 2	Netherlands	Agadir, Morocco
20:30 UTC+2	Boussoufa 73'		Promes 22'; Janssen 68'	Stadium: Stade Adrar; Attendance: 25,000; Referee: Mahamadou Keita (Mali)

4 June 2017	Netherlands	5 – 0	Ivory Coast	Rotterdam, Netherlands
20:45 UTC+2	Veltman 13', 36'; Robben 32'; Klaassen 69'; Janssen 75'			Stadium: De Kuip; Attendance: 33,500; Referee: Harald Lechner (Austria)

==== 2018 FIFA World Cup qualification ====
Pos	Team	Pld	W	D	L	GF	GA	GD	Pts	Qualification	France	Sweden	Netherlands	Bulgaria	Luxembourg	Belarus
1	France	10	7	2	1	18	6	+12	23	Qualification to 2018 FIFA World Cup	—	2–1	4–0	4–1	0–0	2–1
2	Sweden	10	6	1	3	26	9	+17	19	Advance to second round	2–1	—	1–1	3–0	8–0	4–0
3	Netherlands	10	6	1	3	21	12	+9	19		0–1	2–0	—	3–1	5–0	4–1
4	Bulgaria	10	4	1	5	14	19	−5	13		0–1	3–2	2–0	—	4–3	1–0
5	Luxembourg	10	1	3	6	8	26	−18	6		1–3	0–1	1–3	1–1	—	1–0
6	Belarus	10	1	2	7	6	21	−15	5		0–0	0–4	1–3	2–1	1–1	—

Source: FIFA

6 September 2016 2018 FIFA World Cup Q	Sweden	1 – 1	Netherlands	Solna, Sweden
20:45 UTC+2	Berg 43'	Report (FIFA); Report (UEFA)	Sneijder 67'	Stadium: Friends Arena; Attendance: 36,128; Referee: Daniele Orsato (Italy)

7 October 2016 2018 FIFA World Cup Q	Netherlands	4 – 1	Belarus	Rotterdam, Netherlands
20:45 UTC+2	Promes 15', 31'; Klaassen 56'; Janssen 64'	Report (FIFA); Report (UEFA)	Rios 47'	Stadium: De Kuip; Attendance: 41,200; Referee: Craig Thomson (Scotland)

10 October 2016 2018 FIFA World Cup Q	Netherlands	0 – 1	France	Amsterdam, Netherlands
20:45 UTC+2		Report (FIFA); Report (UEFA)	Pogba 30'	Stadium: Amsterdam Arena; Attendance: 50,220; Referee: Damir Skomina (Slovenia)

13 November 2016 2018 FIFA World Cup Q	Luxembourg	1 – 3	Netherlands	Luxembourg, Luxembourg
20:45 UTC+2	Chanot 44' (pen.)	Report (FIFA); Report (UEFA)	Robben 36'; Depay 58', 84'	Stadium: Stade Josy Barthel; Attendance: 8,000; Referee: Anthony Taylor (England)

25 March 2017 2018 FIFA World Cup Q	Bulgaria	2 – 0	Netherlands	Sofia, Bulgaria
21:45 UTC+2	Delev 5', 20'	Report (FIFA); Report (UEFA)		Stadium: Vasil Levski National Stadium; Attendance: 10,900; Referee: Willie Collum (Scotland)

9 June 2017 2018 FIFA World Cup Q	Netherlands	5 – 0	Luxembourg	Rotterdam, Netherlands
20:45 UTC+2	Robben 21'; Sneijder 34'; Wijnaldum 62'; Promes 70'; Janssen 84' (pen.)	Report (FIFA); Report (UEFA)		Stadium: De Kuip; Attendance: 41,300; Referee: Bartosz Frankowski (Poland)
