= 2016–17 Hoofdklasse =

Hoofdklasse
- Season: 2016–17
- Champions: Sat A: Spijkenisse; Sat B: ACV; Sun A: ADO '20; Sun B: Blauw Geel '38
- Promoted: Sat A: Spijkenisse; Sat B: ACV, DOVO; Sun A: ADO '20, De Meern; Sun B: Blauw Geel '38, Quick (H)
- Relegated: Sat A: Sliedrecht, Breukelen, Haaglandia; Sat B: Flevo Boys, Oranje Nassau, SDV Barneveld, ASV Dronten; Sun A: Alverna, JOS Watergraafsmeer, Hoogland, Dieze West; Sun B: DESO, VV Gestel, Chevremont, DOSKO

The 2016–17 season of the Hoofdklasse was played in four leagues, two Saturday leagues and two Sunday leagues. The champions of each group were promoted directly to the 2017–18 Derde Divisie. The 2016–17 Hoofdklasse started on Saturday 13 August 2016.

== Play-offs ==
=== Promotion ===
In each competition teams play periods of 10 games for a total of 3 per season (30 games per season). After each period the best team which hasn't qualified yet will earn a spot in the play-offs for the Derde Divisie as the period champion. 6 teams from the Saturday Hoofdklasse will play against 2 teams from the Saturday Derde Divisie for 2 promotion spots. The teams from the Sunday leagues will do the same.

=== Relegation ===
The teams in place 13 and 14 at the end of the season will fight against relegation in the relegation play-offs. They will face the period champions of the Eerste Klasse.

== Saturday A ==
Since Haaglandia left the competition after the first round, it was decided to split the competition into 2 periods of 14 matches each and to award the title of the third period to the highest ranked team, besides the champions and winners of both periods, at the end of the season.

=== Teams ===
Location of teams in the Saturday Hoofdklasse A 2016/17
South Holland clubs in the Saturday Hoofdklasse A 2016/17

| Club | Home City | Venue | Capacity |
|---|---|---|---|
| Achilles Veen | Veen | Sportpark De Hanen Weide | |
| Ajax (amateurs) | Amsterdam | Sportpark De Toekomst | 5,000 |
| Argon | Mijdrecht | Gemeentelijk Sportpark Hoofdweg | 3,500 |
| Breukelen | Breukelen | Sportpark Broekdijk-Oost | |
| DFS | Opheusden | Sportpark 't Heerenland | |
| Haaglandia | Rijswijk | Sportpark Prinses Irene | 3,000 |
| Hoek | Hoek | Sportpark Denoek | 3,500 |
| Jodan Boys | Gouda | Sportpark de Oosterwei | |
| Noordwijk | Noordwijk | Sportpark Duin Wetering | |
| RVVH | Ridderkerk | Sportpark Ridderkerk | |
| Sliedrecht | Sliedrecht | Sportpark De Lockhorst | |
| Smitshoek | Barendrecht | Sportpark Smitshoek | |
| Spijkenisse | Spijkenisse | Sportpark Jaap Riedijk | |
| Swift | Amsterdam | Sportpark Olympiaplein | |
| Ter Leede | Sassenheim | Gemeentelijk Sportpark De Roodemolen | |
| Zwaluwen | Vlaardingen | Sportpark Zwaluwen | |

=== League table ===
| Pos | Team | Pld | W | D | L | GF | GA | GD | Pts | Qualification or relegation |
|---|---|---|---|---|---|---|---|---|---|---|
| 1 | Spijkenisse (C, P) | 28 | 17 | 5 | 6 | 62 | 35 | +27 | 56 | Promotion to 2017–18 Derde Divisie Saturday |
| 2 | Ter Leede (Note: Assigned as Third Period winner as highest ranked team at the end of the season.) | 28 | 17 | 5 | 6 | 55 | 38 | +17 | 56 | Qualification for 2017–18 Derde Divisie play-offs |
| 3 | Noordwijk (Note: Winner of the Second Period (games 15-28).) | 28 | 16 | 5 | 7 | 66 | 42 | +24 | 53 | Qualification for 2017–18 Derde Divisie play-offs |
| 4 | Achilles Veen (Note: Winner of the First Period (games 1-14).) | 28 | 16 | 5 | 7 | 52 | 36 | +16 | 53 | Qualification for 2017–18 Derde Divisie play-offs |
| 5 | Swift | 28 | 14 | 7 | 7 | 56 | 34 | +22 | 49 | |
| 6 | Ajax (amateurs) | 28 | 14 | 3 | 11 | 50 | 47 | +3 | 45 | |
| 7 | Jodan Boys | 28 | 11 | 8 | 9 | 52 | 39 | +13 | 41 | |
| 8 | Hoek | 28 | 10 | 8 | 10 | 41 | 43 | −2 | 38 | |
| 9 | DFS | 28 | 12 | 2 | 14 | 40 | 51 | −11 | 38 | |
| 10 | Argon | 28 | 10 | 6 | 12 | 44 | 46 | −2 | 36 | |
| 11 | RVVH | 28 | 9 | 6 | 13 | 45 | 50 | −5 | 33 | |
| 12 | Zwaluwen | 28 | 7 | 9 | 12 | 43 | 56 | −13 | 30 | |
| 13 | Sliedrecht (R) | 28 | 7 | 3 | 18 | 49 | 72 | −23 | 24 | Qualification to relegation play-offs |
| 14 | Smitshoek (O) | 28 | 6 | 6 | 16 | 35 | 62 | −27 | 24 | Qualification to relegation play-offs |
| 15 | Breukelen (R) | 28 | 2 | 6 | 20 | 29 | 68 | −39 | 12 | Relegation to 2017–18 Eerste Klasse |
| 16 | Haaglandia (Note: On August 24, 2016 the club filed for bankruptcy after losing a court case against the local council.) | 1 | 0 | 0 | 1 | 2 | 3 | −1 | 0 | Withdrew following bankruptcy |

(C) Champions; (O) Play-off winners; (P) Promoted; (R) Relegated

== Saturday B ==
=== Teams ===
Location of teams in the Saturday Hoofdklasse B 2016/17
Gelderland clubs in the Saturday Hoofdklasse B 2016/17
1 = NSC and Sparta Nijkerk

| Club | Location | Venue | Capacity |
|---|---|---|---|
| ACV | Assen | Sportpark Het Stadsbroek | |
| CSV Apeldoorn | Apeldoorn | Sportpark Orderbos | |
| AZSV | Aalten | Sportpark Villekamp | |
| DOVO | Veenendaal | Sportpark Panhuis | |
| ASV Dronten | Dronten | Sportpark Burgemeester Dekker Park | |
| Eemdijk | Bunschoten | Sportpark De Vinken | |
| Excelsior '31 | Rijssen | Sportpark De Koerbelt | |
| Flevo Boys | Emmeloord | Sportpark Ervenbos | |
| Genemuiden | Genemuiden | Sportpark De Wetering | |
| NSC | Nijkerk | Sportpark De NSC Burcht | |
| Oranje Nassau | Groningen | Sportpark Coendersborg | |
| SDC Putten | Putten | Sportpark Putter Eng | |
| SDV Barneveld | Barneveld | Sportpark Norschoten | |
| Sparta Nijkerk | Nijkerk | Sportpark De Ebbenhorst | |
| Staphorst | Staphorst | Sportpark Het Noorderslag | |
| Urk | Urk | Sportpark De Vormt | |

=== League table ===
| Pos | Team | Pld | W | D | L | GF | GA | GD | Pts | Qualification or relegation |
|---|---|---|---|---|---|---|---|---|---|---|
| 1 | ACV (Note: Winner of the First (games 1-10) and Third Periods (games 21-30).) (C, P) | 30 | 20 | 5 | 5 | 58 | 35 | +23 | 65 | Promotion to 2017–18 Derde Divisie Saturday |
| 2 | DOVO (Note: Winner of the Second Period (games 11-20).) (O, P) | 30 | 18 | 6 | 6 | 62 | 31 | +31 | 60 | Qualification for 2017–18 Derde Divisie play-offs |
| 3 | Staphorst (Note: Substitute winner of the First Period.) | 30 | 16 | 5 | 9 | 68 | 34 | +34 | 53 | Qualification for 2017–18 Derde Divisie play-offs |
| 4 | CSV Apeldoorn (Note: Substitute winner of the Third Period.) | 30 | 15 | 6 | 9 | 61 | 48 | +13 | 51 | Qualification for 2017–18 Derde Divisie play-offs |
| 5 | Excelsior '31 | 30 | 13 | 7 | 10 | 67 | 56 | +11 | 46 | |
| 6 | Genemuiden | 30 | 12 | 9 | 9 | 60 | 42 | +18 | 45 | |
| 7 | Sparta Nijkerk | 30 | 12 | 9 | 9 | 53 | 48 | +5 | 45 | |
| 8 | SDC Putten | 30 | 11 | 12 | 7 | 43 | 39 | +4 | 45 | |
| 9 | Eemdijk | 30 | 12 | 6 | 12 | 58 | 61 | −3 | 42 | |
| 10 | AZSV | 30 | 10 | 8 | 12 | 41 | 37 | +4 | 38 | |
| 11 | Urk | 30 | 10 | 8 | 12 | 41 | 42 | −1 | 38 | |
| 12 | NSC | 30 | 11 | 4 | 15 | 47 | 56 | −9 | 37 | |
| 13 | Flevo Boys (R) | 30 | 10 | 5 | 15 | 47 | 56 | −9 | 35 | Qualification to relegation play-offs |
| 14 | Oranje Nassau (R) | 30 | 10 | 2 | 18 | 42 | 69 | −27 | 32 | Qualification to relegation play-offs |
| 15 | SDV Barneveld (R) | 30 | 6 | 7 | 17 | 33 | 57 | −24 | 25 | Relegation to 2017–18 Eerste Klasse |
| 16 | ASV Dronten (R) | 30 | 2 | 5 | 23 | 27 | 97 | −70 | 11 | Relegation to 2017–18 Eerste Klasse |

(C) Champions; (O) Play-off winners; (P) Promoted; (R) Relegated

== Sunday A ==
=== Teams ===
Location of teams in the Sunday Hoofdklasse A 2016/17

| Club | Location | Venue | Capacity |
|---|---|---|---|
| ADO '20 | Heemskerk | Sportpark De Vlotter | |
| Alverna | Wijchen | Sportpark Bospad | |
| De Bataven | Gendt | Sportpark Walburgen | |
| Dieze West | Zwolle | Sportpark Het Hoge Laar | |
| VV Heerenveen | Heerenveen | Sportpark Skoatterwald | |
| Hollandia | Hoorn | Juliana Sportpark | |
| Hoogland | Hoogland | Sportpark de Langenoord | |
| JOS Watergraafsmeer | Amsterdam | Sportpark Drieburg | |
| De Meern | De Meern | Sportpark De Meern | |
| MSC | Meppel | Sportpark Ezinge | |
| RKHVV | Huissen | Sportpark SP de Blauwenburcht | |
| SDO | Bussum | Sportpark De Kuil | |
| Silvolde | Silvolde | Sportpark de Munsterman | |
| SJC | Noordwijk | Gemeentelijk Sportpark S.J.C. | |
| Sneek Wit Zwart | Sneek | Sportpark VV SWZ | |
| Woezik | Wijchen | Sportpark Noord | |

=== League table ===
| Pos | Team | Pld | W | D | L | GF | GA | GD | Pts | Qualification or relegation |
|---|---|---|---|---|---|---|---|---|---|---|
| 1 | ADO '20 (Note: Winner of the First (games 1-10) and Second Period (games 11-20).) (C, P) | 30 | 19 | 7 | 4 | 82 | 41 | +41 | 64 | Promotion to 2017–18 Derde Divisie Sunday |
| 2 | Woezik (Note: Substitute Winner of the First Period.) | 30 | 16 | 7 | 7 | 57 | 32 | +25 | 55 | Qualification for 2017–18 Derde Divisie play-offs |
| 3 | SJC (Note: Substitute winner of the Second Period.) | 30 | 16 | 5 | 9 | 64 | 39 | +25 | 53 | Qualification for 2017–18 Derde Divisie play-offs |
| 4 | Hollandia | 30 | 15 | 8 | 7 | 51 | 33 | +18 | 53 | |
| 5 | Silvolde | 30 | 15 | 4 | 11 | 54 | 51 | +3 | 49 | |
| 6 | De Meern (Note: Winner of the Third Period (games 21-30).) (O, P) | 30 | 13 | 6 | 11 | 70 | 55 | +15 | 45 | Qualification for 2017–18 Derde Divisie play-offs |
| 7 | Sneek Wit Zwart | 30 | 11 | 8 | 11 | 65 | 52 | +13 | 41 | |
| 8 | SDO | 30 | 9 | 13 | 8 | 42 | 45 | −3 | 40 | |
| 9 | VV Heerenveen | 30 | 11 | 5 | 14 | 49 | 52 | −3 | 38 | |
| 10 | De Bataven | 30 | 11 | 5 | 14 | 45 | 60 | −15 | 38 | |
| 11 | MSC | 30 | 10 | 7 | 13 | 53 | 55 | −2 | 37 | |
| 12 | RKHVV | 30 | 9 | 10 | 11 | 42 | 52 | −10 | 37 | |
| 13 | Alverna (R) | 30 | 8 | 12 | 10 | 50 | 45 | +5 | 36 | Qualification to relegation play-offs |
| 14 | JOS Watergraafsmeer (R) | 30 | 9 | 9 | 12 | 51 | 55 | −4 | 36 | Qualification to relegation play-offs |
| 15 | Hoogland (R) | 30 | 8 | 9 | 13 | 42 | 56 | −14 | 33 | Relegation to 2017–18 Eerste Klasse |
| 16 | Dieze West (R) | 30 | 1 | 3 | 26 | 28 | 122 | −94 | 6 | Relegation to 2017–18 Eerste Klasse |

(C) Champions; (O) Play-off winners; (P) Promoted; (R) Relegated

== Sunday B ==
=== Teams ===
Location of teams in the Sunday Hoofdklasse B 2016/17

| Club | Location | Venue | Capacity |
|---|---|---|---|
| Blauw Geel '38 | Veghel | Sportpark Prins Willem Alexander | 2,000 |
| Chevremont | Kerkrade | Sportpark Kaffeberg | |
| DESO | Oss | Gemeentelijk Sportpark Oss | |
| DHC Delft | Delft | Gemeentelijk Sportpark Brasserskade | |
| DOSKO | Bergen op Zoom | Sportpark Meilust | |
| EHC | Hoensbroek | Sportpark De Dem | 2,000 |
| Gemert | Gemert | Sportpark Molenbroek | 4,000 |
| Gestel | Eindhoven | Sportpark Dommeldal Zuid | |
| Groene Ster | Heerlerheide | Sportpark Pronsebroek | |
| Halsteren | Halsteren | Sportpark De Beek | |
| IFC | Hendrik Ido Ambacht | Sportpark Schildman | |
| Nuenen | Nuenen | Sportpark Oude Landen | |
| Oss '20 | Oss | Sportpark De Rusheuvel | |
| Quick (H) | The Hague | Sportpark Nieuw Hanenburg | |
| RKAVV | Leidschendam | Sportpark Kastelering | |
| Vlissingen | Vlissingen | Sportpark Irislaan | |

=== League table ===
| Pos | Team | Pld | W | D | L | GF | GA | GD | Pts | Qualification or relegation |
|---|---|---|---|---|---|---|---|---|---|---|
| 1 | Blauw Geel '38 (Note: Winner of the First Period (games 1-10).) (C, P) | 30 | 19 | 8 | 3 | 76 | 36 | +40 | 65 | Promotion to 2017–18 Derde Divisie Sunday |
| 2 | Quick (H) (Note: Winner of the Third Period (games 21-30).) (O, P) | 30 | 16 | 6 | 8 | 62 | 35 | +27 | 54 | Qualification for 2017–18 Derde Divisie play-offs |
| 3 | Oss '20 (Note: Winner of the Second Period (games 11-20).) | 30 | 13 | 10 | 7 | 54 | 34 | +20 | 49 | Qualification for 2017–18 Derde Divisie play-offs |
| 4 | Vlissingen (Note: Substitute winner of the First Period.) | 30 | 14 | 7 | 9 | 45 | 34 | +11 | 49 | Qualification for 2017–18 Derde Divisie play-offs |
| 5 | Halsteren | 30 | 13 | 8 | 9 | 48 | 34 | +14 | 47 | |
| 6 | Nuenen | 30 | 13 | 6 | 11 | 57 | 54 | +3 | 45 | |
| 7 | DHC Delft | 30 | 12 | 8 | 10 | 55 | 50 | +5 | 44 | |
| 8 | Gemert | 30 | 10 | 11 | 9 | 57 | 45 | +12 | 41 | |
| 9 | Groene Ster | 30 | 11 | 4 | 15 | 40 | 50 | −10 | 37 | |
| 10 | IFC | 30 | 10 | 5 | 15 | 46 | 55 | −9 | 35 | |
| 11 | RKAVV | 30 | 9 | 8 | 13 | 35 | 48 | −13 | 35 | |
| 12 | EHC | 30 | 10 | 5 | 15 | 33 | 52 | −19 | 35 | |
| 13 | DESO (R) | 30 | 8 | 10 | 12 | 36 | 44 | −8 | 34 | Qualification to relegation play-offs |
| 14 | Gestel (R) | 30 | 9 | 7 | 14 | 40 | 82 | −42 | 34 | Qualification to relegation play-offs |
| 15 | Chevremont (R) | 30 | 9 | 6 | 15 | 53 | 59 | −6 | 33 | Relegation to 2017–18 Eerste Klasse |
| 16 | DOSKO (R) | 30 | 8 | 3 | 19 | 36 | 61 | −25 | 27 | Relegation to 2017–18 Eerste Klasse |

(C) Champions; (O) Play-off winners; (P) Promoted; (R) Relegated

== Promotion play-offs ==
=== Saturday ===
The 2 winners of the second round matches will play next season in the Saturday league of the Derde Divisie. The remaining 6 teams will play next season in the Saturday leagues of the Hoofdklasse.

==== Qualified Teams ====
| Club | Qualification |
|---|---|
| ODIN '59 | 15th in the Derde Divisie Saturday |
| SteDoCo | 16th in the Derde Divisie Saturday |
| Achilles Veen | Winner of the First Period in the Hoofdklasse Saturday A |
| Noordwijk | Winner of the Second Period in the Hoofdklasse Saturday A |
| Ter Leede | 2nd in the Hoofdklasse Saturday A |
| DOVO | Winner of the Second Period in the Hoofdklasse Saturday B |
| Staphorst | 3rd in the Hoofdklasse Saturday B (First Period won by the league champions) |
| CSV Apeldoorn | 4th in the Hoofdklasse Saturday B (Third Period won by the league champions) |

==== Results ====
First round
Noordwijk | 2 | 1 | 3
DOVO * | 3 | 3 | 6
CSV Apeldoorn | 2 | 2 | 4
SteDoCo * | 2 | 5 | 7
Staphorst | 2 | 0 | 2
Ter Leede | 0 | 3 | 3
Achilles Veen | 0 | 1 | 1
ODIN '59 | 1 | 2 | 3

Second round
DOVO ** | 3 | 1 | 4
SteDoCo | 0 | 0 | 0
Ter Leede | 1 | 1 | 2
ODIN '59 *** | 1 | 3 | 4

* Win after extra time in second leg.
** Promotion to Derde Divisie.
*** Succeeded to remain in the Derde Divisie.

=== Sunday ===
The 2 winners of the second round matches will play next season in the Sunday league of the Derde Divisie. The remaining 6 teams will play next season in the Sunday leagues of the Hoofdklasse.

==== Qualified Teams ====
| Club | Qualification |
|---|---|
| Juliana '31 | 15th in the Derde Divisie Sunday |
| Jong Den Bosch | 16th in the Derde Divisie Sunday |
| De Meern | Winner of the Third Period in the Hoofdklasse Sunday A |
| Woezik | 2nd in the Hoofdklasse Sunday A (First Period won by the league champions) |
| SJC | 3rd in the Hoofdklasse Sunday A (Second Period won by the league champions) |
| Oss '20 | Winner of the Second Period in the Hoofdklasse Sunday B |
| Quick (H) | Winner of the Third Period in the Hoofdklasse Sunday B |
| Vlissingen | 4th in the Hoofdklasse Sunday B (First Period won by the league champions) |

==== Results ====
First round
SJC | 1 | 1 | 2
Quick (H) | 1 | 4 | 5
Vlissingen * | 1 | 3 | 4
Jong Den Bosch | 3 | 1 | 4
Oss '20 | 2 | 3 | 5
Woezik | 1 | 0 | 1
De Meern | 4 | 2 | 6
Juliana '31 | 1 | 3 | 4

Second round
Quick (H) ** | 1 | 4 | 5
Vlissingen | 0 | 1 | 1
Oss '20 | 1 | 1 | 2
De Meern ** | 6 | 2 | 8

* Wins after penalty shoot-out (4-2).
** Promotion to Derde Divisie.
