= 2015–16 Hoofdklasse =

Hoofdklasse
- Season: 2015–16
- Champions: Sat A: ODIN '59; Sat B: Quick Boys; Sat C: Harkemase Boys; Sun A: Westlandia; Sun B: Dongen; Sun C: Juliana '31
- Promoted: Sat A: ODIN '59, Huizen; Sat B: Quick Boys, ASWH, Rijnvogels; Sat C: Harkemase Boys, VVOG; Sun A: Westlandia, ASV De Dijk, OFC; Sun B: Dongen, UDI '19; Sun C: Juliana '31, Be Quick 1887, Quick '20
- Relegated: Sat A: Bennekom, SVL, LRC, VVA '71; Sat B: XerxesDZB, Heinenoord, Sportlust '46, Deltasport; Sat C: SVZW, HZVV, DOS '37, Drachtster Boys; Sun A: EDO, Nieuwerkerk, Nieuw Utrecht, Leonidas; Sun B: Baronie, SV TOP; Sun C: Rohda Raalte, Achilles 1894, Rigtersbleek, Alcides

The 2015–16 season of the Hoofdklasse is competed in six leagues, three Saturday leagues and three Sunday leagues. The champions of each group will be promoted directly to the 2016–17 Derde Divisie. The 2015–16 Hoofdklasse started on Saturday 5 September 2014.

== Teams ==
=== Saturday A ===
Location of teams in the Saturday A

Club	Home City	Venue	Capacity
Achilles Veen	Veen	Sportpark De Hanen Weide	
Ajax (amateurs)	Amsterdam	De Toekomst	5,000
Bennekom	Bennekom	De Eikelhof	4,000
DOVO	Veenendaal	Sportpark Panhuis	3,200
Eemdijk	Bunschoten-Spakenburg	Sportpark De Vinken	
Huizen	Huizen	Sportpark De Wolfskamer	5,000
LRC	Leerdam	Sportpark Bruinsdeel	
NSC	Nijkerk	Sportpark De NSC Burcht	
ODIN '59	Heemskerk	Sportpark Assumburg	3,000
SDC Putten	Putten	Sportpark Putter Eng	4,000
Sparta Nijkerk	Nijkerk	De Ebbenhorst	
SVL	Langbroek	Sportpark Oranjehof	
Swift	Amsterdam	Sportpark Olympiaplein	
VVA '71	Achterberg	Sportpark De Meent	

=== Saturday B ===
Location of teams in the Saturday B

Club	Location	Venue	Capacity
ASWH	Hendrik-Ido-Ambacht	Sportpark Schildman	3,000
Deltasport	Vlaardingen	Sportpark de Broekpolder	
Haaglandia	Rijswijk	Prinses Irene Sportpark	3,000
Heinenoord	Heinenoord	Sportpark De Tienvoet	
Hoek	Hoek	Sportpark Denoek	3,500
Jodan Boys	Gouda	Sportpark Oosterwei	1,500
Noordwijk	Noordwijk	Sportpark Duin Wetering	
Quick Boys	Katwijk aan Zee	Nieuw-Zuid	7,500
Rijnvogels	Katwijk aan den Rijn	Sportpark De Kooltuin	
Spijkenisse	Spijkenisse	Sportpark Jaap Riedijk	
Sportlust '46	Woerden	Cromwijck	1,400
Ter Leede	Sassenheim	Gemeentelijk Sportpark De Roodemolen	
XerxesDZB	Rotterdam	Sportpark Faas Wilkes	3,500
Zwaluwen	Vlaardingen	Sportpark Zwaluwenlaan	

=== Saturday C ===
Location of teams in the Saturday C

Club	Location	Venue	Capacity
ACV	Assen	Univé Sportpark	5.000
AZSV	Aalten	Villekamp	
CSV Apeldoorn	Apeldoorn	Sportpark Orderbos	2.500
DOS '37	Vriezenveen	Sportpark Het Midden	
Drachtster Boys	Drachten	Drachtster Bos	
Excelsior '31	Rijssen	Sportpark De Koerbelt	
Flevo Boys	Emmeloord	Sportpark Ervenbos	3.000
Genemuiden	Genemuiden	Sportpark De Wetering	
Harkemase Boys	Harkema	De Bosk	5.500
HZVV	Hoogeveen	Bentinckspark	
Staphorst	Staphorst	Het Noorderslag	2.500
SVZW	Wierden	Het Lageveld	3,000
Urk	Urk	Sportpark De Vormt	
VVOG	Harderwijk	De Strokel	2,500

=== Sunday A ===
Location of teams in the Sunday A

Club	Location	Venue	Capacity
ADO '20	Heemskerk	Sportpark De Vlotter	
DHC	Delft	Brasserskade	
ASV De Dijk	Amsterdam	Schellingwoude	1,500
EDO	Haarlem	Noordersportpark	
JOS Watergraafsmeer	Amsterdam	Sportpark Drieburg	
Leonidas	Rotterdam	Sportpark Leonidas	
De Meern	De Meern	Sportpark De Meern	
Nieuwerkerk	Nieuwerkerk aan den IJssel	Sportpark Dorrestein	
Nieuw Utrecht	Utrecht	Sportpark Rijnvliet	1,500
OFC	Oostzaan	Sportpark OFC	1,500
Quick	The Hague	Nieuw Hanenburg	
RKAVV	Leidschendam	Sportpark Kastelering	
SDO	Bussum	Sportpark De Kuil	
Westlandia	Naaldwijk	Sportpark De Hoge Bomen	2,000

=== Sunday B ===
Location of teams in the Sunday B

Club	Location	Venue	Capacity
Baronie	Breda	Sportpark De Blauwe Kei	7.000
Blauw Geel '38	Veghel	Prins Willem Alexander Sportpark	2,000
DESO	Oss	Gemeentelijk Sportpark Oss	
Dongen	Dongen	De Biezen	
DOSKO	Bergen op Zoom	Meilust	
EHC	Hoensbroek	Sportpark De Dem	2,000
Gemert	Gemert	Molenbroek	4,000
Gestel	Eindhoven	Sportpark Dommeldal Zuid	
Groene Ster	Heerlen	Pronsebroek	
Halsteren	Halsteren	Sportpark De Beek	
Oss '20	Oss	Sportpark De Rusheuvel	
SV TOP	Oss	Sportpark TOP	
UDI '19	Uden	Parkzicht	
Vlissingen	Vlissingen	Sportpark Irislaan	

=== Sunday C ===
Location of teams in the Sunday C

Club	Location	Venue	Capacity
Achilles 1894	Assen	Sportpark Marsdijk	
Alcides	Meppel	Ezinge	
Alverna	Wijchen	Sportpark Bospad	
De Bataven	Gendt	Walburgen	
Be Quick 1887	Haren	Stadion Esserberg	12,000
Dieze West	Zwolle	Sportpark Het Hoge Laar	
Hollandia	Hoorn	Juliana	2,500
Juliana '31	Malden	De Broeklanden	
MSC	Meppel	Ezinge	
Quick '20	Oldenzaal	Vondersweijde	6,500
Rigtersbleek	Enschede	Sportpark vv Rigtersbleek	
RKHVV	Huissen	De Blauwenburcht	
Rohda Raalte	Raalte	Tijenraan	
Silvolde	Silvolde	Sportpark de Munsterman	

== League tables ==
=== Saturday A ===
Pos	Team	Pld	W	D	L	GF	GA	GD	Pts	Qualification or relegation
1	ODIN '59 (Note: Winner of the Second Period (round 13-24).) (C, P)	24	16	3	5	57	32	+25	51	Promotion to 2016–17 Derde Divisie Saturday
2	Huizen (Note: Winner of the First Period (round 1-12).) (O, P)	24	15	3	6	54	26	+28	48	Qualification for promotion/relegation play-offs Derde Divisie/Hoofdklasse Saturday
3	DOVO (Note: Winner of the Third Period as highest ranked team without a period title.)	24	14	2	8	47	29	+18	44	Qualification for promotion/relegation play-offs Derde Divisie/Hoofdklasse Saturday
4	Achilles Veen (Note: Substitute winner of the Second Period.)	24	13	4	7	46	30	+16	43	Qualification for promotion/relegation play-offs Derde Divisie/Hoofdklasse Saturday
5	Eemdijk	24	12	4	8	34	28	+6	40	
6	Ajax (amateurs)	24	10	5	9	42	38	+4	35	
7	Sparta Nijkerk	24	10	3	11	38	38	0	33	
8	SDC Putten	24	9	5	10	35	35	0	32	
9	Swift	24	8	6	10	31	44	−13	30	
10	NSC	24	8	4	12	31	46	−15	28	
11	Bennekom (R)	24	6	6	12	28	43	−15	24	Qualification promotion/relegation play-offs Hoofdklasse/Eerste Klasse
12	SVL (R)	24	6	2	16	40	63	−23	20	Qualification promotion/relegation play-offs Hoofdklasse/Eerste Klasse
13	LRC (R)	24	3	5	16	20	51	−31	14	Relegation to 2016–17 Eerste Klasse
14	VVA '71 (Note: On December 24, 2015 VVA '71 indicated to be bankrupt because of problems with the taxation authority.) (R)	13	4	1	8	12	23	−11	13	Taken out of competition, all matches declared void

(C) Champions; (O) Play-off winners; (P) Promoted; (R) Relegated

=== Saturday B ===
Pos	Team	Pld	W	D	L	GF	GA	GD	Pts	Qualification or relegation
1	Quick Boys (Note: Winner of the Second Period (round 9-17).) (C, P)	26	20	4	2	58	16	+42	64	Promotion to 2016–17 Derde Divisie Saturday
2	Noordwijk (Note: Winner of the Third Period (round 18-26).)	26	19	5	2	63	19	+44	62	Qualification for promotion/relegation play-offs Derde Divisie/Hoofdklasse Saturday
3	ASWH (Note: Substitute winner of the Second Period.) (O, P)	26	15	3	8	53	25	+28	48	Qualification for promotion/relegation play-offs Derde Divisie/Hoofdklasse Saturday
4	Rijnvogels (Note: Winner of the First Period (round 1-8).) (O, P)	26	14	3	9	41	32	+9	45	Qualification for promotion/relegation play-offs Derde Divisie/Hoofdklasse Saturday
5	Spijkenisse	26	14	3	9	48	41	+7	45	
6	Jodan Boys	26	13	3	10	40	28	+12	42	
7	Ter Leede	26	12	4	10	36	40	−4	40	
8	Hoek	26	10	4	12	29	37	−8	34	
9	Zwaluwen	26	8	6	12	37	51	−14	30	
10	Haaglandia	26	9	3	14	35	49	−14	30	
11	XerxesDZB (R)	26	6	6	14	32	43	−11	24	Qualification promotion/relegation play-offs Hoofdklasse/Eerste Klasse
12	Heinenoord (R)	26	5	5	16	21	52	−31	20	Qualification promotion/relegation play-offs Hoofdklasse/Eerste Klasse
13	Sportlust '46 (R)	26	3	9	14	27	56	−29	18	Relegation to 2016–17 Eerste Klasse
14	Deltasport (R)	26	4	2	20	29	60	−31	14	Relegation to 2016–17 Eerste Klasse

(C) Champions; (O) Play-off winners; (P) Promoted; (R) Relegated

=== Saturday C ===
Pos	Team	Pld	W	D	L	GF	GA	GD	Pts	Qualification or relegation
1	Harkemase Boys (Note: Winner of the First Period (round 1-8).) (C, P)	26	18	4	4	73	27	+46	58	Promotion to 2016–17 Derde Divisie Saturday
2	Staphorst (Note: Winner of the Third Period (round 18-26).)	26	18	2	6	60	32	+28	56	Qualification for promotion/relegation play-offs Derde Divisie/Hoofdklasse Saturday
3	ACV (Note: Substitute winner of the First Period.)	26	14	5	7	42	38	+4	47	Qualification for promotion/relegation play-offs Derde Divisie/Hoofdklasse Saturday
4	VVOG (Note: Winner of the Second Period (round 9-17).) (O, P)	26	13	5	8	62	40	+22	44	Qualification for promotion/relegation play-offs Derde Divisie/Hoofdklasse Saturday
5	AZSV	26	11	8	7	47	41	+6	41	
6	Flevo Boys	26	11	6	9	46	43	+3	39	
7	Excelsior '31	26	11	5	10	53	44	+9	38	
8	CSV Apeldoorn	26	10	7	9	48	48	0	37	
9	Urk	26	7	10	9	36	37	−1	31	
10	Genemuiden	26	7	10	9	38	40	−2	31	
11	SVZW (R)	26	7	8	11	44	54	−10	29	Qualification promotion/relegation play-offs Hoofdklasse/Eerste Klasse
12	HZVV (R)	26	5	8	13	31	52	−21	23	Qualification promotion/relegation play-offs Hoofdklasse/Eerste Klasse
13	DOS '37 (R)	26	5	4	17	31	71	−40	19	Relegation to 2016–17 Eerste Klasse
14	Drachtster Boys (R)	26	2	4	20	24	68	−44	10	Relegation to 2016–17 Eerste Klasse

(C) Champions; (O) Play-off winners; (P) Promoted; (R) Relegated

=== Sunday A ===
Pos	Team	Pld	W	D	L	GF	GA	GD	Pts	Qualification or relegation
1	Westlandia (Note: Winner of the First Period (round 1-8).) (C, P)	26	21	2	3	75	39	+36	65	Promotion to 2016–17 Derde Divisie Sunday
2	ASV De Dijk (Note: Substitute winner of the Third Period.) (O, P)	26	17	4	5	68	37	+31	55	Qualification for promotion/relegation play-offs Derde Divisie/Hoofdklasse Sunday
3	DHC (Note: Winner of the Second Period (round 9-17).)	26	16	7	3	52	26	+26	55	Qualification for promotion/relegation play-offs Derde Divisie/Hoofdklasse Sunday
4	OFC (Note: Winner of the Third Period (round 14-26).) (O, P)	26	16	4	6	55	35	+20	52	Qualification for promotion/relegation play-offs Derde Divisie/Hoofdklasse Sunday
5	Quick	26	14	6	6	51	38	+13	48	
6	ADO '20	26	12	6	8	54	34	+20	42	
7	De Meern	26	7	9	10	45	48	−3	30	
8	RKAVV	26	8	6	12	36	41	−5	30	
9	JOS Watergraafsmeer	26	8	6	12	34	39	−5	30	
10	SDO	26	5	11	10	27	30	−3	26	
11	EDO (R)	26	6	6	14	35	52	−17	24	Qualification promotion/relegation play-offs Hoofdklasse/Eerste Klasse
12	Nieuwerkerk (R)	26	5	8	13	33	62	−29	23	Qualification promotion/relegation play-offs Hoofdklasse/Eerste Klasse
13	Nieuw Utrecht (Note: Leonidas received 1 and Nieuw Utrecht 2 penalty points for their abandoned match.) (R)	26	4	2	20	22	58	−36	12	Relegation to 2016–17 Eerste Klasse
14	Leonidas (R)	26	3	3	20	31	79	−48	11	Relegation to 2016–17 Eerste Klasse

(C) Champions; (O) Play-off winners; (P) Promoted; (R) Relegated

=== Sunday B ===
Pos	Team	Pld	W	D	L	GF	GA	GD	Pts	Qualification or relegation
1	Dongen (Note: Winner of the First Period (round 1-8).) (C, P)	26	18	6	2	53	21	+32	60	Promotion to 2016–17 Derde Divisie Sunday
2	Oss '20 (Note: Winner of the Second Period (round 9-17).)	26	16	3	7	57	27	+30	51	Qualification for promotion/relegation play-offs Derde Divisie/Hoofdklasse Sunday
3	EHC (Note: Substitute winner of the First Period.)	26	16	3	7	43	29	+14	51	Qualification for promotion/relegation play-offs Derde Divisie/Hoofdklasse Sunday
4	UDI '19 (Note: Winner of the Third Period (round 18-26).) (O, P)	26	14	5	7	35	33	+2	47	Qualification for promotion/relegation play-offs Derde Divisie/Hoofdklasse Sunday
5	Gemert	26	11	5	10	49	40	+9	38	
6	Blauw Geel '38	26	10	7	9	44	35	+9	37	
7	DOSKO	26	9	8	9	40	38	+2	35	
8	Gestel	26	10	5	11	42	49	−7	35	
9	Halsteren	26	8	8	10	41	44	−3	32	
10	DESO	26	9	4	13	35	35	0	31	
11	Groene Ster (O)	26	9	4	13	30	38	−8	31	Qualification promotion/relegation play-offs Hoofdklasse/Eerste Klasse
12	Vlissingen (Note: Vlissingen received 4 penalty points because apparently death threats were made against the match officials.) (O)	26	9	6	11	41	41	0	29	Qualification promotion/relegation play-offs Hoofdklasse/Eerste Klasse
13	Baronie (R)	26	7	3	16	32	49	−17	24	Relegation to 2016–17 Eerste Klasse
14	SV TOP (R)	26	2	1	23	23	86	−63	7	Relegation to 2016–17 Eerste Klasse

(C) Champions; (O) Play-off winners; (P) Promoted; (R) Relegated

=== Sunday C ===
Pos	Team	Pld	W	D	L	GF	GA	GD	Pts	Qualification or relegation
1	Juliana '31 (Note: Winner of the First Period (round 1-8).) (C, P)	26	20	5	1	67	30	+37	65	Promotion to 2016–17 Derde Divisie Sunday
2	Be Quick 1887 (Note: Winner of the Second Period (round 9-17).) (O, P)	26	17	4	5	69	26	+43	55	Qualification for promotion/relegation play-offs Derde Divisie/Hoofdklasse Sunday
3	Quick '20 (Note: Substitute winner of the First Period.) (O, P)	26	17	3	6	68	29	+39	54	Qualification for promotion/relegation play-offs Derde Divisie/Hoofdklasse Sunday
4	Silvolde	26	14	6	6	43	30	+13	48	
5	De Bataven (Note: Winner of the Third Period (round 18-26).)	26	14	4	8	55	44	+11	46	Qualification for promotion/relegation play-offs Derde Divisie/Hoofdklasse Sunday
6	Dieze West	26	11	3	12	41	51	−10	36	
7	MSC	26	9	7	10	50	52	−2	34	
8	Hollandia	26	9	6	11	38	32	+6	33	
9	Alverna	26	8	9	9	35	31	+4	33	
10	RKHVV	26	9	6	11	45	53	−8	33	
11	Rohda Raalte (R)	26	9	5	12	44	54	−10	32	Qualification promotion/relegation play-offs Hoofdklasse/Eerste Klasse
12	Achilles 1894 (R)	26	6	3	17	39	73	−34	21	Qualification promotion/relegation play-offs Hoofdklasse/Eerste Klasse
13	Rigtersbleek (R)	26	3	4	19	26	74	−48	13	Relegation to 2016–17 Eerste Klasse
14	Alcides (R)	26	3	1	22	27	68	−41	10	Relegation to 2016–17 Eerste Klasse

(C) Champions; (O) Play-off winners; (P) Promoted; (R) Relegated

== Promotion/relegation play-off Derde Divisie – Hoofdklasse ==
Both for the Saturday and Sunday leagues applies the same systematic.

The team ranked 15th in the Topklasse and the 3 period winners of the 3 leagues (9 teams), making a total of 10 teams participate in the play-offs.

In previous years these 10 teams competed in 3 rounds for a berth in the Topklasse. In the first round the 3 period winners of each league competed first for a berth in the second round (3 teams). Only in the second round the team ranked 15th in the Topklasse joined, making the total at that moment 4 teams. These 4 teams participated in a 2-round 2 leg system for 1 berth in next seasons Topklasse. The other 9 teams played next season in the Hoofdklasse.

With the introduction of the new league system, from Topklasse and Hoofdklasse to Tweede Divisie, Derde Divisie and Hoofdklasse, the number of berths for now the Derde Divisie was increased from 1 to 5.

As a result, the 10 teams were right away paired up to play a 1-round 2 leg knockout system. The 5 winners played next season in the 2016–17 Derde Divisie and the 5 losers in the 2016–17 Hoofdklasse.

For details and results see 2015–16 Derde Divisie / Hoofdklasse promotion/relegation play-offs.

== Promotion/relegation play-off Hoofdklasse – Eerste Klasse ==
=== Saturday ===
The teams ranked 11th and 12th of each of the 3 Saturday leagues (6 teams) and the 3 period winners of each of the 5 Saturday Eerste Klasse leagues (15 teams), making a total of 21 teams participate in the play-offs.

In previous years these 21 teams were split up into 7 groups of 3 teams each. The winner of each group played next season in the Hoofdklasse and the remaining teams in the Eerste Klasse.

With the introduction of the new league system, from Topklasse and Hoofdklasse to Tweede Divisie, Derde Divisie and Hoofdklasse, the number of Hoofdklasse Saturday leagues was reduced from 3 to 2.

As a result, the 21 teams are not competing any more for 7 berths in the Hoofdklasse, but only for 3 berths.

To accomplish this, the 21 teams were first split into 3 groups of 7 teams each. All 7 teams in 1 group playing each other would be too time-consuming. Therefore, each group of 7 teams is split up further into 2 subgroups or poules. One poule of 4 and one poule of 3 teams. The split is made in such a way that there will be a team, which played this season in the Hoofdklasse, in each of the poules (6 total).

In the first round each poule played a semi competition. In the poules with 3 teams, each team played one match at home and one match away. In the poules with 4 teams, 2 teams played two matches at home and one match away, and the other 2 teams played only one match at home and two matches away.

In the second round, the 2 winners of the poules within a group decide which team played next season the Hoofdklasse.

==== First round ====
===== Group 1 =====
====== Poule A ======
Pos	Team	Pld	W	D	L	GF	GA	GD	Pts	Second round or Eerste Klasse	SLI	NOO	BEN
1	Sliedrecht	2	1	0	1	9	5	+4	3	To Second round			8–2
2	Nootdorp	2	1	0	1	4	3	+1	3	To 2016–17 Eerste Klasse Saturday	3–1		
3	Bennekom	2	1	0	1	4	9	−5	3	To 2016–17 Eerste Klasse Saturday		2–1	

====== Poule B ======
Pos	Team	Pld	W	D	L	GF	GA	GD	Pts	Second round or Eerste Klasse	HEI	BAL	GAK	ORA
1	Heinenoord	3	3	0	0	8	1	+7	9	To Second round				4–0
2	Balk	3	1	1	1	4	3	+1	4	To 2016–17 Eerste Klasse Saturday	0–2		1–1	
3	Go-Ahead Kampen	3	1	1	1	8	8	0	4	To 2016–17 Eerste Klasse Saturday	1–2			
4	Oranje Wit	3	0	0	3	5	13	−8	0	To 2016–17 Eerste Klasse Saturday		0–3	5–6	

===== Group 2 =====
====== Poule A ======
Pos	Team	Pld	W	D	L	GF	GA	GD	Pts	Second round or Eerste Klasse	BRI	SVZ	BER
1	Brielle	2	1	1	0	3	2	+1	4	To Second round		2–1	
2	SVZW	2	1	0	1	5	3	+2	3	To 2016–17 Eerste Klasse Saturday			4–1
3	Berkum	2	0	1	1	2	5	−3	1	To 2016–17 Eerste Klasse Saturday	1–1		

====== Poule B ======
Pos	Team	Pld	W	D	L	GF	GA	GD	Pts	Second round or Eerste Klasse	BRE	SVL	GRA	PKC
1	Breukelen	3	3	0	0	9	5	+4	9	To Second round			3–2	2–1
2	SVL	3	2	0	1	12	6	+6	6	To 2016–17 Eerste Klasse Saturday	2–4			
3	's-Gravenzande	3	1	0	2	7	5	+2	3	To 2016–17 Eerste Klasse Saturday		0–2		
4	PKC '83	3	0	0	3	3	15	−12	0	To 2016–17 Eerste Klasse Saturday		2–8	0–5	

===== Groep 3 =====
====== Poule A ======
Pos	Team	Pld	W	D	L	GF	GA	GD	Pts	Second round or Eerste Klasse	DRO	XER	ROD
1	Dronten (Note: Based on penalty shoot-out XerxesDZB 3 – 4 Dronten)	2	1	1	0	5	2	+3	4	To Second round			4–1
2	XerxesDZB	2	1	1	0	4	1	+3	4	To 2016–17 Eerste Klasse Saturday	1–1		
3	Roda '46	2	0	0	2	1	7	−6	0	To 2016–17 Eerste Klasse Saturday		0–3	

====== Poule B ======
Pos	Team	Pld	W	D	L	GF	GA	GD	Pts	Second round or Eerste Klasse	ZWA	HZV	NUN	RIJ
1	Zwaluwen '30	3	3	0	0	13	2	+11	9	To Second round			3–0	6–1
2	HZVV	3	2	0	1	6	6	0	6	To 2016–17 Eerste Klasse Saturday	1–4			
3	Nunspeet	3	1	0	2	4	8	−4	3	To 2016–17 Eerste Klasse Saturday		1–3		3–2
4	Rijsoord	3	0	0	3	4	11	−7	0	To 2016–17 Eerste Klasse Saturday		1–2		

==== Second round ====
Team 1	Agg.	Team 2	1st leg	2nd leg
^{(Penalties)} Sliedrecht	2 (6) – 2 (5)	Heinenoord	0 – 2	2 – 0
Brielle	1 – 2	Breukelen	0 – 1	1 – 1
Dronten	2 – 1	Zwaluwen '30	1 – 0	1 – 1

=== Sunday ===
The teams ranked 11th and 12th of each of the 3 Sunday leagues (6 teams) and the 3 period winners of each of the 6 Sunday Eerste Klasse leagues (18 teams), making a total of 24 teams participate in the play-offs.

In previous years these 24 teams played in a 2-round 2 leg knockout system. The 6 winners of the second/final round played next season in the Hoofdklasse and the remaining teams in the Eerste Klasse.

With the introduction of the new league system, from Topklasse and Hoofdklasse to Tweede Divisie, Derde Divisie and Hoofdklasse, the number of Hoofdklasse Sunday leagues were reduced from 3 to 2.

As a result, the 24 teams were not competing any more for 6 berths in the Hoofdklasse, but only for 2 berths. However, since the Topklasse club WKE went bankrupt and therefore their team did not relegate to the Hoofdklasse, an extra berth became available. So the teams could compete for 3 berths.

To go from 24 to 3 teams the teams played a 3-round 2 leg knockout system. The teams are paired in a way that two teams, which played this season in the Hoofdklasse, can't meet until the final third round.

First round
Fortuna Wormeerveer	2	1	3
EDO ^{(Pen. 1–3)}	2	1	3
VOC	1	1	2
Purmersteijn	2	2	4
HVCH	1	2	3
Bekkerveld	0	1	1
Vlissingen ^{(a.e.t.)}	2	2	4
Meerssen	1	1	2

Second round
EDO	1	1	2
Purmersteijn	0	1	1
HVCH	0	1	1
Vlissingen	4	3	7

Final round
EDO	0	0	0
Vlissingen	2	6	8

First round
Nemelaer	2	0	2
Groene Ster	1	2	3
Heidebloem	1	3	4
't Zand	2	0	2
Orion	0	1	1
SVBO	5	1	6
Achilles 1894	1	2	3
FVC	5	1	6

Second round
Groene Ster	1	0	1
Heidebloem	0	0	0
SVBO	2	3	5
FVC	1	2	3

Final round
Groene Ster	3	2	5
SVBO	0	2	2

First round
Alphense Boys	0	2	2
Boshuizen	1	3	4
Nieuwerkerk	0	3	3
SJC	2	4	6
Longa '30	1	1	2
Rohda Raalte	2	3	5
WVV 1896	1	1	2
Tubantia ^{(a.e.t.)}	1	2	3

Second round
Boshuizen	0	2	2
SJC	1	4	5
Rohda Raalte	2	3	5
Tubantia	1	0	1

Final round
SJC	3	3	6
Rohda Raalte	0	1	1

Sources:,
