= 2016–17 Derde Divisie =

Derde Divisie
- Season: 2016–17
- Champions: Sat: IJsselmeervogels; Sun: De Dijk
- Promoted: Sat: IJsselmeervogels; Sat: Rijnsburgse Boys; Sat: Lisse; Sun: De Dijk
- Relegated: Sat: Huizen; Sat: Rijnvogels; Sat: SteDoCo; Sun: UDI '19; Sun: Jong Achilles '29; Sun: Juliana '31; Sun: Jong Den Bosch

The 2016–17 Derde Divisie season is the first edition of the new Dutch fourth tier, formerly called Topklasse, since the restructuring of the league system in the summer of 2016.

This change in the league system was approved in a KNVB assembly in December 2014. A new semi-professional level Tweede Divisie was added at the third tier, thus the Derde Divisie and leagues below it decremented by one level, and furthermore, promotion and relegation between the Tweede Divisie and the new Derde Divisie became effective.

== Teams ==
=== Saturday league ===
Location of teams in the Saturday Derde Divisie 2016-17
South Holland clubs in the Saturday Derde divisie 2016/17

Club	Location	Venue	Capacity	Manager
Jong Almere City	Almere	Yanmar Stadion	3,200	René Koster
ASWH	Hendrik-Ido-Ambacht	Sportpark Schildman	3,000	Jack van den Berg
Capelle	Capelle aan den IJssel	Sportpark 't Slot	4,000	Ton van Bremen
DVS '33	Ermelo	Sportlaan	1,500	Roeland ten Berge
Jong Groningen	Groningen	Sportpark Corpus den Hoorn	1,500	Alfons Arts
Harkemase Boys	Harkema	Sportpark De Bosk	5,500	Jan Vlap
Huizen	Huizen	Sportpark De Wolfskamer	6,000	Henk van de Pol
IJsselmeervogels	Spakenburg	Sportpark De Westmaat	8,000	Sandor van der Heide
Lisse	Lisse	Sportpark Ter Specke	5,000	Robert de Ruiter
ODIN '59	Heemskerk	Sportpark Assumburg	3,000	Richard Plug
ONS Sneek	Sneek	Zuidersportpark	3,150	Richard Karrenbelt
Quick Boys	Katwijk aan Zee	Sportpark Nieuw Zuid	8,500	Jan Zoutman
Rijnsburgse Boys	Rijnsburg	Sportpark Middelmors	6,100	Pieter Mulders
Rijnvogels	Katwijk aan den Rijn	Sportpark De Kooltuin	3,000	Hein van Heek
Scheveningen	Scheveningen	Sportpark Houtrust	3,500	John Blok
SteDoCo	Hoornaar	Sportpark SteDoCo	1,700	Virgil Breetveld
Jong Volendam	Volendam	Kras Stadion	7,200	Berry Smit
VVOG	Harderwijk	Sportpark De Strokel	10,000	Ed Engelkes

=== Sunday league ===
Location of teams in the Sunday Derde Divisie 2016-17
North Brabant clubs in the Saturday Derde divisie 2016/17

Club	Location	Venue	Capacity	Manager
Jong Achilles '29	Groesbeek	Sportpark De Heikant	4,500	Dennis Krijgsman
Be Quick 1887	Haren	Stadion Esserberg	12,000	Mischa Visser
Jong Den Bosch	's-Hertogenbosch	Stadion De Vliert	8,500	Arnold Scholten
ASV De Dijk	Amsterdam	Sportpark Schellingwoude	1,500	Jochem Twisker
Jong De Graafschap	Varsselder	De Buitenham	1,500	Richard Roelofsen
JVC Cuijk	Cuijk	Sportpark De Groenendijkse	3,000	Ruud Kaiser
VV Dongen	Dongen	Sportpark De Biezen	1,800	Ron Timmers
EVV	Echt	Sportpark In de Bandert	2,000	Leo Beckers
HBS Craeyenhout	The Hague	Sportpark Daal en Bergselaan	1,000	Marcel Koning
USV Hercules	Utrecht	Sportpark Voordorp	800	Erik Speelziek
HSC '21	Haaksbergen	Groot Scholtenhagen	4,500	Eddy Boerhof
Juliana '31	Malden	Sportpark De Broeklanden	1,500	Arnold Brehler
Magreb '90	Utrecht	Sportpark Papendorp	1,000	Aart Jan van Boksel
OFC Oostzaan	Oostzaan	Sportpark OFC	1,500	Imdat Ilgüy
OJC Rosmalen	Rosmalen	Sportpark De Groote Wielen	3,000	David Vecht
Quick '20	Oldenzaal	Vondersweijde	7,000	René Nijhuis
UDI '19	Uden	Sportpark Parkzicht	5,000	Bert Ruijsch
RKVV Westlandia	Naaldwijk	Sportpark De Hoge Bomen	2,000	Edwin Grünholz

== League tables ==
=== Saturday league ===
Pos	Team	Pld	W	D	L	GF	GA	GD	Pts	Qualification or relegation
1	IJsselmeervogels (C, P)	34	21	7	6	74	36	+38	70	Promotion to Tweede Divisie
2	Lisse (Q, O, P)	34	20	5	9	55	38	+17	65	Qualification to promotion play-offs
3	Rijnsburgse Boys (Q, O, P)	34	17	10	7	84	62	+22	61	Qualification to promotion play-offs
4	ASWH	34	17	7	10	64	53	+11	58	
5	Scheveningen	34	16	8	10	54	48	+6	56	
6	Jong Volendam	34	16	8	10	60	56	+4	56	
7	DVS '33	34	13	9	12	54	49	+5	48	
8	Jong Groningen	34	11	12	11	48	46	+2	45	
9	Harkemase Boys (Note: Harkemase Boys and ODIN '59 were deducted one point for not having the required number of players with a contract.) (Q)	34	13	7	14	55	60	−5	45	Qualification to promotion play-offs
10	VVOG	34	12	8	14	49	55	−6	44	
11	Quick Boys	34	11	10	13	47	54	−7	43	
12	Capelle	34	11	8	15	42	52	−10	41	
13	ONS Sneek	34	10	10	14	51	60	−9	40	
14	Jong Almere City (Note: Jong Almere were deducted one point for having three players from the first team on the field at the same time, while the rules only allow two players from the first team on the field at the same time.)	34	11	6	17	63	61	+2	38	
15	ODIN '59 (Q)	34	10	6	18	58	63	−5	35	Qualification to relegation play-offs
16	SteDoCo (Q, R)	34	9	8	17	46	69	−23	35	Qualification to relegation play-offs
17	Huizen (R)	34	9	6	19	38	57	−19	33	Relegation to Hoofdklasse
18	Rijnvogels (R)	34	10	3	21	55	78	−23	33	Relegation to Hoofdklasse

Source: Tweededivisie.org (in Dutch)
(C) Champions; (O) Play-off winners; (P) Promoted; (Q) Qualified for the phase indicated; (R) Relegated

=== Sunday league ===
Pos	Team	Pld	W	D	L	GF	GA	GD	Pts	Qualification or relegation
1	De Dijk (C, P)	34	27	2	5	91	42	+49	83	Promotion to Tweede Divisie
2	Westlandia (Note: RKVV Westlandia, VV Dongen, Quick '20, USV Hercules, Be Quick 1887, EVV, OJC Rosmalen, HBS Craeyenhout, Magreb '90, Juliana '31 and UDI '19 were deducted one point for not having the required number of players with a contract.) (Q)	34	23	6	5	101	47	+54	74	Qualification to promotion play-offs
3	Dongen (Q)	34	21	3	10	65	46	+19	65	Qualification to promotion play-offs
4	USV Hercules (Q)	34	18	7	9	64	48	+16	60	Qualification to promotion play-offs
5	Quick '20	34	16	7	11	67	57	+10	54	
6	Be Quick 1887	34	17	3	14	74	61	+13	53	
7	HSC '21	34	14	6	14	73	69	+4	48	
8	EVV	34	14	6	14	57	49	+8	47	
9	HBS Craeyenhout	34	15	2	17	55	62	−7	46	
10	OFC	34	12	8	14	53	62	−9	44	
11	JVC Cuijk	34	12	8	14	48	58	−10	44	
12	OJC Rosmalen	34	11	8	15	47	69	−22	40	
13	Jong De Graafschap	34	10	6	18	66	79	−13	36	
14	Magreb '90 (Note: Magreb '90 was deducted one point for not having the required number of players with a contract and an additional three points for failing to meet the license criteria in general.)	34	11	6	17	53	78	−25	35	
15	Juliana '31 (Q, R)	34	10	5	19	56	68	−12	34	Qualification to relegation play-offs
16	Jong Den Bosch (Q, R)	34	7	9	18	45	61	−16	30	Qualification to relegation play-offs
17	UDI '19 (R)	34	8	7	19	45	80	−35	30	Relegation to Hoofdklasse
18	Jong Achilles '29 (Note: Jong Achilles '29 was deducted one point for having one dispensation player too many on the team in the away match against Quick '20) (R)	34	7	7	20	58	82	−24	27	Relegation to Hoofdklasse

Source: Tweededivisie.org (in Dutch)
(C) Champions; (P) Promoted; (Q) Qualified for the phase indicated; (R) Relegated

== Promotion/relegation play-offs Tweede and Derde Divisie ==
The numbers 15 and 16 from the 2016–17 Tweede Divisie and three (substitute) period winners of each of the 2016–17 Derde Divisie's, making a total of eight teams, decide in a 2-round knockout system in which two teams will play next season in the 2017–18 Tweede Divisie. The remaining six teams will play next season in the 2017–18 Derde Divisie.

=== Qualified Teams ===
Club	Qualification
UNA	15th in the Tweede Divisie
Spakenburg	16th in the Tweede Divisie
Lisse	Winner of the First Period in the Derde Divisie Saturday
Harkemase Boys	Winner of the Second Period in the Derde Divisie Saturday
Rijnsburgse Boys	3rd in the Derde Divisie Saturday (Third Period won by the league champions)
Dongen	3rd in the Derde Divisie Sunday (First Period won by the league champions)
Westlandia	Winner of the Second Period in the Derde Divisie Sunday
USV Hercules	4th in the Derde Divisie Sunday (Third Period won by the league champions)

=== Results ===
First round
A
Rijnsburgse Boys	1	5	6
Westlandia	2	1	3
B
USV Hercules	2	2	4
Spakenburg	1	4	5
C
Dongen	2	1	3
Lisse	5	2	7
D
Harkemase Boys	0	3	3
UNA	1	1	2

Final round
E
Rijnsburgse Boys *	2	3	5
Spakenburg	1	2	3
F
Lisse *	1	4	5
Harkemase Boys	2	1	3

* Promotion to Tweede Divisie

=== First round ===
==== Match A ====
17 May 2017 First leg	Rijnsburgse Boys	1 - 2	Westlandia	Rijnsburg
	Serbony 70'		van Bochoven 11'; Bajic 57'	Stadium: Sportpark Middelmors; Attendance: 1,000; Referee: Clay Ruperti

20 May 2017 Second leg	Westlandia	1 - 5 (6 - 3 agg.)	Rijnsburgse Boys	Naaldwijk
	de Bruijn 67'		Tillema 16', 19', 79'; Serbony 21', 57'	Stadium: Sportpark De Hoge Bomen; Attendance: 1,500; Referee: Derya Serik

==== Match B ====
17 May 2017 First leg	USV Hercules	2 - 1	Spakenburg	Utrecht
	Keizer 36'; Issarti 58'		Maynard 84'	Stadium: Sportpark Voordorp; Attendance: 1,700; Referee: Kevin Puts

20 May 2017 Second leg	Spakenburg	4 - 2 (4 - 5 agg.)	USV Hercules	Bunschoten-Spakenburg
	Lanting 17'; Mulder 32' (o.g.); Pilon 64'; Dua 87'		Reynaers 28' (pen.); Stokkers 77'	Stadium: Sportpark De Westmaat; Attendance: 1,900; Referee: Edgar Bijl

==== Match C ====
17 May 2017 First leg	Dongen	2 - 5	Lisse	Dongen
	Koenen 28'; Kools 34'		Stevens 55'; Fokkema 63' van der Putten 83', 86', 90+5'	Stadium: Sportpark De Biezen; Attendance: 1,000; Referee: Frank de Winter

20 May 2017 Second leg	Lisse	2 - 1 (3 - 7 agg.)	Dongen	Lisse
	van der Putten 58'; Rauws 73' (pen.)		van Bree 50'	Stadium: Sportpark Ter Specke; Attendance: 215; Referee: Frank van den Elzen

==== Match D ====
17 May 2017 First leg	Harkemase Boys	0 - 1	UNA	Harkema
			Tielemans 59'	Stadium: Sportpark De Bosk; Attendance: 450; Referee: Wim Bronsvoort

20 May 2017 Second leg	UNA	1 - 3 (3 - 2 agg.)	Harkemase Boys	Veldhoven
	Tieben 33'		Schokker 14'; Streutker 61'; Uuldriks 77'	Stadium: Sportpark Zeelst; Attendance: 500; Referee: Clay Ruperti

=== Final round ===
==== Match E ====
23 May 2017 First leg	Rijnsburgse Boys	2 - 1	Spakenburg	Rijnsburg
	Jongeneelen 21', 71'		Maynard 19'	Stadium: Sportpark Middelmors; Attendance: 2,200; Referee: Sander de Brito Roque

27 May 2017 Second leg	Spakenburg	2 - 3 (5 - 3 agg.)	Rijnsburgse Boys	Bunschoten-Spakenburg
	Ties 48'; Buijtenhuis 57'		Tillema 42'; Jongeneelen 78', 90+4'	Stadium: Sportpark De Westmaat; Attendance: 3,250; Referee: Lorenzo Cairo

==== Match F ====
23 May 2017 First leg	Lisse	1 - 2	Harkemase Boys	Lisse
	van der Putten 10' (pen.)		Bouius 6'; Schokker 80' (pen.)	Stadium: Sportpark Ter Specke; Attendance: 225; Referee: Kevin Puts

27 May 2017 Second leg	Harkemase Boys	1 - 4 (5 - 3 agg.)	Lisse	Harkema
	Schotanus 83'		Stevens 34' van der Putten 63', 90'; Önal 87'	Stadium: Sportpark De Bosk; Attendance: 1,000; Referee: Edgar Bijl

== Promotion/relegation play-offs Derde Divisie and Hoofdklasse ==
The numbers 15 and 16 from the 2016–17 Derde Divisie Saturday league and 3 (substitute) period winners of each of the two 2016–17 Hoofdklasse Saturday leagues, making a total of 8 teams, decided in a 2-round knockout system which 2 teams play next season in the 2017–18 Derde Divisie Saturday league. The remaining 6 teams play next season in the 2017–18 Hoofdklasse Saturday leagues.

The same applied for the 2016–17 Derde Divisie Sunday league and each of the two 2016–17 Hoofdklasse Sunday leagues.

See Hoofdklasse promotion play-offs.
