= 2015–16 Eerste Klasse =

Eerste Klasse
- Season: 2015–16

2015–16 Eerste Klasse was a Dutch association football season of the Eerste Klasse.

Saturday champions were:

- DFS Opheusden
- SV Argon
- VV Smitshoek
- SDV Barneveld
- Oranje Nassau Groningen

Sunday champions were:

- VV Hoogland
- Ido's Football Club
- RKSV Nuenen
- VV Chevremont
- SC Woezik
- VV Heerenveen
