= 2017–18 Hoofdklasse =

Hoofdklasse
- Season: 2017–18
- Champions: Sat A: Noordwijk; Sat B: Eemdijk; Sun A: SJC; Sun B: Oss '20
- Promoted: Sat A: Noordwijk; SteDoCo; Hoek; Sat B: Eemdijk; Ajax (amateurs); Sun A: SJC; Sun B: Oss '20; GOES
- Relegated: Sat A: Argon; RVVH; Rijsoord; AFC; Sat B: Zuidvogels; NSC; HZVV; Huizen; Sun A: Jong Achilles '29; VV Heerenveen; Sneek Wit Zwart; DHC Delft; Sun B: Woezik; EHC; BVC '12; Juliana '31

The 2017–18 season of the Hoofdklasse was played in four leagues, two Saturday leagues and two Sunday leagues. The champions of each group promote directly to the 2018–19 Derde Divisie. The 2017–18 Hoofdklasse started on Saturday 2 September 2017.

== Play-offs ==
=== Promotion ===
In each competition teams play periods of 10 games, three times per season (30 games per season). After each period the best team which has not yet qualified earns a spot in the play-offs for the Derde Divisie as the period champion. 6 teams from the Saturday Hoofdklasse play against 2 teams from the Saturday Derde Divisie for 2 promotion spots. The teams from the Sunday leagues do the same.

=== Relegation ===
The teams in place 13 and 14 at the end of the season fight against relegation in the relegation play-offs. They face the period champions of the Eerste Klasse.

== Saturday A ==
=== Teams ===
Location of teams in the Saturday Hoofdklasse A 2017/18
South Holland clubs in the Saturday Hoofdklasse A 2017/18

Club	Home City	Venue	Capacity
Achilles Veen	Veen	Sportpark De Hanen Weide	
AFC	Amsterdam	Sportpark Goed Genoeg	
Argon	Mijdrecht	Sportpark Argon	3,500
's-Gravenzande	's-Gravenzande	Juliana Sportpark	
Hoek	Hoek	Sportpark Denoek	3,500
Jodan Boys	Gouda	Sportpark Oosterwei	
Noordwijk	Noordwijk	Sportpark Duin Wetering	
Nootdorp	Nootdorp	Sportpark 's-Gravenhout	
Rijnvogels	Katwijk aan den Rijn	Sportpark De Kooltuin	
Rijsoord	Ridderkerk	Sportpark Rijsoord	
RVVH	Ridderkerk	Sportpark Ridderkerk	
Smitshoek	Barendrecht	Sportpark Smitshoek	
SteDoCo	Hoornaar	Sportpark SteDoCo	
Swift	Amsterdam	Sportpark Olympiaplein	
Ter Leede	Sassenheim	Gemeentelijk Sportpark De Roodemolen	
Zwaluwen	Vlaardingen	Sportpark Zwaluwen	

=== Standings ===
Pos	Team	Pld	W	D	L	GF	GA	GD	Pts	Promotion, qualification or relegation
1	Noordwijk (Note: Winner of the First Period (games 1-10).) (C, P)	30	22	3	5	89	33	+56	69	Promotion to 2018–19 Derde Divisie Saturday
2	Ter Leede (Note: Winner of the Second Period (games 11-20).)	30	20	2	8	70	43	+27	62	Qualification for 2018–19 Derde Divisie play-offs
3	SteDoCo (Note: Winner of the Third Period (games 21-30).) (O, P)	30	17	9	4	61	32	+29	60	Qualification for 2018–19 Derde Divisie play-offs
4	Hoek (Note: Substitute winner of the First Period (games 1-10).) (O, P)	30	16	7	7	63	41	+22	55	Qualification for 2018–19 Derde Divisie play-offs
5	Achilles Veen	30	16	6	8	48	34	+14	54	
6	Rijnvogels	30	12	8	10	47	41	+6	44	
7	's-Gravenzande	30	13	4	13	69	61	+8	43	
8	Jodan Boys	30	12	6	12	53	46	+7	42	
9	Zwaluwen	30	10	10	10	49	54	−5	40	
10	Swift	30	10	7	13	40	54	−14	37	
11	Smitshoek	30	9	7	14	47	59	−12	34	
12	Nootdorp	30	10	2	18	35	67	−32	32	
13	AFC (R)	30	8	6	16	56	69	−13	30	Qualification to relegation play-offs
14	Rijsoord (R)	30	7	8	15	33	57	−24	29	Qualification to relegation play-offs
15	RVVH (R)	30	6	6	18	24	55	−31	24	Relegation to 2018–19 Eerste Klasse
16	Argon (R)	30	4	5	21	32	70	−38	17	Relegation to 2018–19 Eerste Klasse

Source: Soccerway
Rules for classification: 1) points; 2) goal difference; 3) number of goals scored
(C) Champions; (O) Play-off winners; (P) Promoted; (R) Relegated

== Saturday B ==
=== Teams ===
Location of teams in the Saturday Hoofdklasse B 2017/18
Gelderland clubs in the Saturday Hoofdklasse B 2017/18

Club	Location	Venue	Capacity
Ajax (amateurs)	Amsterdam	Sportpark De Toekomst	5,000
CSV Apeldoorn	Apeldoorn	Sportpark Orderbos	
AZSV	Aalten	Sportpark Villekamp	
Berkum	Zwolle	Sportpark De Vegtlust	
DFS	Opheusden	Sportpark 't Heerenland	
Eemdijk	Bunschoten-Spakenburg	Sportpark De Vinken	
Excelsior '31	Rijssen	Sportpark De Koerbelt	
Genemuiden	Genemuiden	Sportpark De Wetering	
Huizen	Huizen	Sportpark De Wolfskamer	
HZVV	Hoogeveen	Sportvelden Bentinckspark	
NSC	Nijkerk	Sportpark De NSC Burcht	
SDC Putten	Putten	Sportpark Putter Eng	
Sparta Nijkerk	Nijkerk	Sportpark De Ebbenhorst	
Staphorst	Staphorst	Sportpark Het Noorderslag	
Urk	Urk	Sportpark De Vormt	
Zuidvogels	Huizen	Sportpark De Wolfskamer	

=== Standings ===
Pos	Team	Pld	W	D	L	GF	GA	GD	Pts	Promotion, qualification or relegation
1	Eemdijk (Note: Winner of the Second Period (games 11-20).) (C, P)	30	17	7	6	63	33	+30	58	Promotion to 2018–19 Derde Divisie Saturday
2	Berkum (Note: Substitute winner of the Second Period (games 11-20).)	30	17	5	8	52	36	+16	56	Qualification for 2018–19 Derde Divisie play-offs
3	Genemuiden	30	16	6	8	74	45	+29	54	
4	Ajax (amateurs) (Note: Winner of the Third Period (games 21-30).) (O, P)	30	16	6	8	69	45	+24	54	Qualification for 2018–19 Derde Divisie play-offs
5	Staphorst	30	12	10	8	55	44	+11	46	
6	Urk	30	13	4	13	47	44	+3	43	
7	AZSV	30	11	9	10	38	39	−1	42	
8	DFS	30	10	11	9	47	43	+4	41	
9	Excelsior '31 (Note: Winner of the First Period (games 1-10).)	30	12	5	13	40	45	−5	41	Qualification for 2018–19 Derde Divisie play-offs
10	SDC Putten	30	11	8	11	40	50	−10	41	
11	Sparta Nijkerk	30	10	10	10	47	37	+10	40	
12	CSV Apeldoorn	30	10	6	14	51	61	−10	36	
13	HZVV (R)	30	8	8	14	37	54	−17	32	Qualification to relegation play-offs
14	Huizen (R)	30	6	8	16	47	65	−18	26	Qualification to relegation play-offs
15	Zuidvogels (R)	30	6	8	16	40	70	−30	26	Relegation to 2018–19 Eerste Klasse
16	NSC (R)	30	7	5	18	46	82	−36	26	Relegation to 2018–19 Eerste Klasse

Source: Soccerway
Rules for classification: 1) points; 2) goal difference; 3) number of goals scored
(C) Champions; (O) Play-off winners; (P) Promoted; (R) Relegated

== Sunday A ==
=== Teams ===
Location of teams in the Sunday Hoofdklasse A 2017/18

Club	Location	Venue	Capacity
Achilles 1894	Assen	Sportpark Marsdijk	
Jong Achilles '29	Groesbeek	Sportpark De Heikant	
Alphense Boys	Alphen aan den Rijn	Sportpark De Bijlen	
De Bataven	Gendt	Sportpark Walburgen	
DHC Delft	Delft	Gemeentelijk Sportpark Brasserskade	
VV Heerenveen	Heerenveen	Sportpark Skoatterwald	
Hollandia	Hoorn	Juliana Sportpark	
Leonidas	Rotterdam	Sportpark Leonidas	
MSC	Meppel	Sportpark Ezinge	
Purmersteijn	Purmerend	Sportpark Purmersteijn	
RKAVV	Leidschendam	Sportpark Kastelering	
RKHVV	Huissen	Sportpark SP de Blauwenburcht	
SDO	Bussum	Sportpark De Kuil	
Silvolde	Silvolde	Sportpark de Munsterman	
SJC	Noordwijk	Gemeentelijk Sportpark S.J.C.	
Sneek Wit Zwart	Sneek	Sportpark VV SWZ	

=== Standings ===
Pos	Team	Pld	W	D	L	GF	GA	GD	Pts	Promotion, qualification or relegation
1	SJC (Note: Winner of the First Period (games 1-10).) (C, P)	30	18	8	4	75	37	+38	62	Promotion to 2018–19 Derde Divisie Sunday
2	Achilles 1894 (Note: Winner of the Third Period (games 21-30).)	30	16	8	6	73	34	+39	56	Qualification for 2018–19 Derde Divisie play-offs
3	Silvolde (Note: Substitute winner of the First Period (games 1-10).)	30	15	10	5	69	35	+34	55	Qualification for 2018–19 Derde Divisie play-offs
4	Leonidas	30	15	6	9	65	53	+12	51	
5	Purmersteijn	30	14	6	10	57	47	+10	48	
6	Hollandia (Note: Winner of the Second Period (games 11-20).)	30	14	5	11	65	48	+17	47	Qualification for 2018–19 Derde Divisie play-offs
7	Alphense Boys	30	13	8	9	54	49	+5	47	
8	SDO	30	13	5	12	60	50	+10	44	
9	RKAVV	30	11	8	11	55	51	+4	41	
10	MSC	30	12	5	13	60	77	−17	41	
11	De Bataven	30	9	8	13	42	48	−6	35	
12	RKHVV	30	10	5	15	50	63	−13	35	
13	Sneek Wit Zwart (R)	30	9	6	15	37	49	−12	33	Qualification to relegation play-offs
14	DHC Delft (R)	30	8	6	16	47	73	−26	30	Qualification to relegation play-offs
15	VV Heerenveen (R)	30	6	6	18	34	72	−38	24	Relegation to 2018–19 Eerste Klasse
16	Jong Achilles '29 (R)	30	4	6	20	45	102	−57	18	Relegation to 2018–19 Eerste Klasse

Source: Soccerway
Rules for classification: 1) points; 2) goal difference; 3) number of goals scored
(C) Champions; (P) Promoted; (R) Relegated

== Sunday B ==
=== Teams ===
Location of teams in the Sunday Hoofdklasse B 2017/18

Club	Location	Venue	Capacity
Baronie	Breda	Sportpark Blauwe Kei	
BVC '12	Beek	Sportpark BVC	
Jong Den Bosch	's-Hertogenbosch	Stadion De Vliert	8,500
EHC	Hoensbroek	Sportpark De Dem	2,000
Gemert	Gemert	Sportpark Molenbroek	4,000
GOES	Goes	Sportpark Het Schenge	
Groene Ster	Heerlerheide	Sportpark Pronsebroek	
Halsteren	Halsteren	Sportpark De Beek	
IFC	Hendrik Ido Ambacht	Sportpark Schildman	
Juliana '31	Malden	Sportpark De Broeklanden	
Meerssen	Meerssen	Sportpark Marsana	
Nuenen	Nuenen	Sportpark Oude Landen	
Oss '20	Oss	Sportpark De Rusheuvel	
UDI '19	Uden	Gemeentelijk Sportpark	
Vlissingen	Vlissingen	Sportpark Irislaan	
Woezik	Wijchen	Sportpark Noord	

=== Standings ===
Pos	Team	Pld	W	D	L	GF	GA	GD	Pts	Promotion, qualification or relegation
1	OSS '20 (Note: Winner of the Second Period (games 11-20).) (C, P)	30	18	10	2	73	30	+43	64	Promotion to 2018–19 Derde Divisie Sunday
2	GOES (Note: Winner of the Third Period (games 21-30).) (O, P)	30	18	4	8	66	41	+25	58	Qualification for 2018–19 Derde Divisie play-offs
3	Halsteren (Note: Substitute winner of the Second Period (games 11-20).)	30	17	4	9	48	31	+17	55	Qualification for 2018–19 Derde Divisie play-offs
4	Jong Den Bosch	30	14	7	9	63	44	+19	49	
5	UDI '19	30	13	8	9	60	50	+10	47	
6	Gemert (Note: Winner of the First Period (games 1-10).)	30	14	3	13	63	49	+14	45	Qualification for 2018–19 Derde Divisie play-offs
7	Meerssen	30	14	3	13	56	46	+10	45	
8	IFC	30	11	9	10	45	53	−8	42	
9	Nuenen	30	12	5	13	49	62	−13	41	
10	Vlissingen	30	11	6	13	44	39	+5	39	
11	Groene Ster	30	11	6	13	45	51	−6	39	
12	Baronie	30	9	9	12	42	41	+1	36	
13	Juliana '31 (R)	30	10	3	17	39	61	−22	33	Qualification to relegation play-offs
14	BVC '12 (R)	30	8	6	16	43	63	−20	30	Qualification to relegation play-offs
15	EHC (R)	30	8	5	17	41	72	−31	29	Relegation to 2018–19 Eerste Klasse
16	Woezik (R)	30	7	2	21	37	81	−44	23	Relegation to 2018–19 Eerste Klasse

Source: Soccerway
Rules for classification: 1) points; 2) goal difference; 3) number of goals scored
(C) Champions; (O) Play-off winners; (P) Promoted; (R) Relegated

== Promotion/relegation play-offs Derde Divisie and Hoofdklasse ==
=== Saturday ===
The numbers 15 and 16 from the 2017–18 Derde Divisie Saturday and 3 (substitute) period winners of each of the 2017–18 Hoofdklassen Saturday, making 8 teams, decided in a 2-round knockout system of which 2 teams play next season in the 2018–19 Derde Divisie Saturday. The remaining 6 teams play next season in the 2018–19 Hoofdklasse Saturday.

==== Qualified Teams ====
Club	Qualification
Capelle	15th in the Derde Divisie Saturday
VV Spijkenisse	16th in the Derde Divisie Saturday
Hoek	4th in the Hoofdklasse A Saturday (First Period won by the league champions)
Ter Leede	Winner of the Second Period in the Hoofdklasse A Saturday
SteDoCo	Winner of the Third Period in the Hoofdklasse A Saturday
Excelsior '31	Winner of the First Period in the Hoofdklasse B Saturday
Berkum	2nd in the Hoofdklasse B Saturday (Second Period won by the league champions)
Ajax (amateurs)	Winner of the Third Period in the Hoofdklasse B Saturday

==== Results ====
First round
A
SteDoCo (pen.)	1	3	4 (8)
Berkum	2	2	4 (7)
B
Excelsior '31	1	2	3
Capelle	4	1	5
C
Ajax (amateurs) (pen.)	2	0	2 (4)
Ter Leede	0	2	2 (3)
D
Hoek	1	2	3
VV Spijkenisse	0	2	2

Second round
E
SteDoCo	0	3	3
Capelle	1	0	1
F
Ajax (amateurs)	1	2	3
Hoek	3	1	4

SteDoCo and Hoek promoted to the 2018-19 Derde Divisie Saturday.
VV Spijkenisse relegated to the 2018-19 Hoofdklasse Saturday.
Capelle and Ajax (amateurs) played an extra match.
The other teams remained in the 2018-19 Hoofdklasse Saturday.

==== Extra match ====
Because Jong Twente decided at the end of season to withdraw from the Derde Divisie Saturday and to continue in the league for reserve teams only, an extra spot became available in the Derde Divisie Saturday. Therefore, the two teams who lost in the second round of the play-offs were given a second chance. In an extra match, on neutral ground, these teams competed for the spot that became available.

Capelle	1–2	Ajax (amateurs)

Ajax (amateurs) promoted to the 2018-19 Derde Divisie Saturday.
Capelle relegated to the 2018-19 Hoofdklasse Saturday.

=== Sunday ===
The numbers 15 and 16 from the 2017–18 Derde Divisie Sunday and 3 (substitute) period winners of each of the 2017–18 Hoofdklassen Sunday, making 8 teams, decided in a 2-round knockout system which 2 teams play next season in the 2018–19 Derde Divisie Sunday. The remaining 6 teams play next season in the 2018–19 Hoofdklasse Sunday.

==== Qualified Teams ====
Club	Qualification
Quick '20	15th in the Derde Divisie Sunday
Be Quick 1887	16th in the Derde Divisie Sunday
Silvolde	3rd in the Hoofdklasse A Sunday (First Period won by the league champions)
Hollandia	Winner of the Second Period in the Hoofdklasse A Sunday
Achilles 1894	Winner of the Third Period in the Hoofdklasse A Sunday
Gemert	Winner of the First Period in the Hoofdklasse B Sunday
Halsteren	3rd in the Hoofdklasse B Sunday (Second Period won by the league champions)
GOES	Winner of the Third Period in the Hoofdklasse B Sunday

==== Results ====
First round
A
Silvolde	1	1	2
GOES	2	1	3
B
Gemert	2	0	2
Be Quick 1887	0	5	5
C
Halsteren (pen.)	1	0	1 (6)
Achilles 1894	1	0	1 (5)
D
Hollandia	1	1	2
Quick '20	1	2	3

Second round
E
GOES	2	2	4
Be Quick 1887	2	0	2
F
Halsteren	1	2	3
Quick '20 (a.e.t.)	0	4	4

GOES promoted to the 2018-19 Derde Divisie Sunday.
Quick '20 maintained in the 2018-19 Derde Divisie Sunday.
Be Quick 1887 relegated to the 2018-19 Hoofdklasse Sunday.
The other teams remained in the 2018-19 Hoofdklasse Sunday.

== Promotion/relegation play-offs Hoofdklasse and Eerste Klasse ==
=== Saturday ===
The numbers 13 and 14 from each of the 2017–18 Hoofdklasse Saturday leagues (2 times 2 teams) and 3 (substitute) period winners of each of the 2017–18 Eerste Klasse Saturday leagues (5 times 3 teams), making 19 teams, decided in a 3-round single match knockout system of which 3 teams play next season in the 2018–19 Hoofdklasse Saturday leagues. The remaining 16 teams play next season in the 2018–19 Eerste Klasse Saturday leagues.

Out of the 4 Hoofdklasse teams and the 5 highest ranked period winners (9 teams total), 5 teams were excluded by draw from playing the first round.

Home advantage was decided by a draw.

==== Qualified Teams ====
Club	Qualification
AFC	13th in the Hoofdklasse A Saturday
Rijsoord	14th in the Hoofdklasse A Saturday
HZVV	13th in the Hoofdklasse B Saturday
Huizen	14th in the Hoofdklasse B Saturday
Sportlust '46	Winner of the First Period in the Eerste Klasse A Saturday
ARC	Winner of the Second Period in the Eerste Klasse A Saturday
XerxesDZB	3rd in the Eerste Klasse A Saturday (Third Period won by the league champions)
Brielle	2nd in the Eerste Klasse B Saturday (First Period won by the league champions)
Kloetinge	Winner of the Second Period in the Eerste Klasse B Saturday
Oranje Wit	Winner of the Third Period in the Eerste Klasse B Saturday
Montfoort	Winner of the First Period in the Eerste Klasse C Saturday
DTS Ede	3rd in the Eerste Klasse C Saturday (Second Period won by the league champions)
WNC	Winner of the Third Period in the Eerste Klasse C Saturday
DETO	Winner of the First Period in the Eerste Klasse D Saturday
WHC	Winner of the Second Period in the Eerste Klasse D Saturday
Flevo Boys	2nd in the Eerste Klasse D Saturday (Third Period won by the league champions)
Drachtster Boys	Winner of the First Period in the Eerste Klasse E Saturday
Gorecht	3rd in the Eerste Klasse E Saturday (Second Period won by the league champions)
VV Groningen	Winner of the Third Period in the Eerste Klasse E Saturday

==== Results ====
First round
A
DETO	2
AFC	1
B
VV Groningen	3
WNC	1
C
XerxesDZB	3
Oranje Wit	0

Second round
H
DETO (a.e.t.)	2
VV Groningen	0
I
Huizen	0
XerxesDZB	4

Third round
N
DETO	3
XerxesDZB	0

First round
D
DTS Ede	1
Kloetinge	2
E
Drachtster Boys	1 (2)
Sportlust '46 (pen.)	1 (3)
F
HZVV	0
Montfoort	1
G
WHC	1
Gorecht	0

Second round
J
Kloetinge	1 (3)
Sportlust '46 (pen.)	1 (4)
K
Montfoort	0
WHC	3

Third round
O
Sportlust '46	2
WHC	3

First round

Second round
L
Brielle	4
ARC	3
M
Flevo Boys	3
Rijsoord	1

Third round
P
Brielle	1
Flevo Boys	4

DETO, WHC and Flevo Boys promoted to the 2018-19 Hoofdklasse Saturday.
AFC, Rijsoord, HZVV and Huizen relegated to the 2018-19 Eerste Klasse Saturday.
XerxesDZB, Sportlust '46 and Brielle played extra matches.
The other teams remained in the 2018-19 Eerste Klasse Saturday.

==== Extra matches ====
Because Jong Twente decided, at the end of season, to withdraw from the Derde Divisie Saturday and to continue in the league for reserve teams only, an extra spot became available in the Derde Divisie Saturday. This caused a repeated pattern of an extra available spot for all lower Saturday tiers of the pyramid. Therefore, the three teams who lost in the third round of the play-offs were given a second chance. In extra matches, each team playing one match at home and one match away, these teams competed for the spot that became available in the 2018-19 Hoofdklasse Saturday.

Brielle	2–1	Sportlust '46

Sportlust '46	0–2	XerxesDZB

XerxesDZB	3–0	Brielle

XerxesDZB promoted to the 2018-19 Derde Divisie Saturday.
Brielle and Sportslust '46 remained in the 2018-19 Hoofdklasse Saturday.

=== Sunday ===
The numbers 13 and 14 from each of the 2017–18 Hoofdklasse Sunday leagues (2 times 2 teams) and 3 (substitute) period winners of each of the 2017–18 Eerste Klasse Sunday leagues (6 times 3 teams), making 22 teams, decided in a 4-round single match knockout system of which 2 teams play next season in the 2018–19 Hoofdklasse Sunday leagues. The remaining 20 teams play next season in the 2018–19 Eerste Klasse Sunday leagues.

The 4 Hoofdklasse teams and the 6 highest ranked period winners (10 teams total) were excluded from playing the first round. In the first round the second best and lowest ranked period winners (of each Eerste Klasse separate) meet each other, where the lowest ranked period winner has home advantage.

In the second round home advantage was decided by draw.

==== Qualified Teams ====
Club	Qualification
Sneek Wit Zwart	13th in the Hoofdklasse A Sunday
DHC Delft	14th in the Hoofdklasse A Sunday
Juliana '31	13th in the Hoofdklasse B Sunday
BVC '12	14th in the Hoofdklasse B Sunday
JOS Watergraafsmeer	Winner of the First Period in the Eerste Klasse A Sunday
Legmeervogels	3rd in the Eerste Klasse A Sunday (Second Period won by the league champions)
DEM	Winner of the Third Period in the Eerste Klasse A Sunday
VOC	4th in the Eerste Klasse B Sunday (First Period won by the league champions)
Nieuwerkerk	Winner of the Second Period in the Eerste Klasse B Sunday
Hoogland	2nd in the Eerste Klasse B Sunday (No third period, rank based)
Rood-Wit	4th in the Eerste Klasse C Sunday (First Period won by the league champions)
SV TOP	Winner of the Second Period in the Eerste Klasse C Sunday
HVCH	2nd in the Eerste Klasse C Sunday (No third period, rank based)
Geldrop	Winner of the First Period in the Eerste Klasse D Sunday
Chevremont	2nd in the Eerste Klasse D Sunday (Third Period won by the league champions)
Bekkerveld	Winner of the Third Period in the Eerste Klasse D Sunday
Longa '30	2nd in the Eerste Klasse E Sunday (Third Period won by the league champions)
Rohda Raalte	Winner of the Second Period in the Eerste Klasse E Sunday
SC NEC	Winner of the Third Period in the Eerste Klasse E Sunday
Alcides	2nd in the Eerste Klasse F Sunday (Third Period won by the league champions)
VV Emmen	Winner of the Second Period in the Eerste Klasse F Sunday
WVV 1896	Winner of the Third Period in the Eerste Klasse F Sunday

==== Results ====
First round
A
SV TOP	0
Rood-Wit	1
B
WVV 1896	2
VV Emmen	1
C
Legmeervogels	1
JOS Watergraafsmeer	2

Second round
G
Rood-Wit	1
WVV 1896	0
H
Hoogland	1
Longa '30	0
I
JOS Watergraafsmeer	5
Chevremont	3
J
HVCH	3
DHC Delft	1

Third round
O
Rood-Wit	1
Hoogland	2
P
JOS Watergraafsmeer	1
HVCH	2

Fourth round
S
Hoogland (pen.)	1 (4)
HVCH	1 (2)

First round
D
~~Nieuwerkerk~~*
VOC
E
Rohda Raalte (a.e.t.)	2
SC NEC	1
F
Bekkerveld	2
Geldrop	6

Second round
K
VOC	4
BVC '12	3
L
Juliana '31	0
DEM	2
M
Sneek Wit Zwart	1
Rohda Raalte	2
N
Alcides	1
Geldrop	0

Third round
Q
VOC	0
DEM	4
R
Rohda Raalte	1
Alcides	2

Fourth round
T
DEM	0
Alcides	1

Hoogland and Alcides promoted to the 2018-19 Hoofdklasse Sunday.
Sneek Wit Zwart, DHC Delft, Juliana '31 and BVC '12 relegated to the 2018-19 Eerste Klasse Sunday.
HVCH and DEM played an extra match.
The other teams remained in the 2018-19 Eerste Klasse Sunday.

==== Extra match ====
Because Jong De Graafschap, relegated from Derde Divisie, decided at the end of season to withdraw from the Hoofdklasse for next season and to continue in the league for reserve teams only, an extra spot became available in the Hoofdklasse Sunday leagues. Therefore, the two teams who lost in the fourth round of the play-offs were given a second chance. In an extra match, on neutral ground, these teams competed for the spot that became available.

HVCH	1–2	DEM

DEM promoted to the 2018-19 Hoofdklasse Sunday.
HVCH remained in the 2018-19 Eerste Klasse Sunday.
