= 2017–18 Derde Divisie =

Derde Divisie
- Season: 2017–18
- Champions: Sat: SV Spakenburg; Sun: Jong Vitesse
- Promoted: Sat: SV Spakenburg; Jong Almere City; Scheveningen; Sun: Jong Vitesse
- Relegated: Sat: Magreb '90; ACV; VV Spijkenisse; Capelle; Sun: De Meern; Jong De Graafschap; Be Quick 1887

The 2017–18 Derde Divisie season is the second edition of the new Dutch fourth tier, formerly called Topklasse, since the restructuring of the league system in the summer of 2016.

== Teams ==
=== Saturday league ===
Location of teams in the Saturday Derde Divisie 2017–18. Saturday clubs are green dots, while Sunday clubs are red dots.

| Club | Location | Venue | Capacity | Manager |
|---|---|---|---|---|
| ACV | Assen | Univé-Sportpark | 5,000 | Fred de Boer |
| Jong Almere City | Almere | Yanmar Stadion | 3,200 | Ivar van Dinteren |
| ASWH | Hendrik-Ido-Ambacht | Sportpark Schildman | 3,000 | Jack van den Berg; Cesco Agterberg |
| Capelle | Capelle aan den IJssel | Sportpark 't Slot | 3,000 | Ton van Bremen |
| DOVO | Veenendaal | Sportpark Panhuis | 3,200 | Gert Kruys |
| DVS '33 | Ermelo | Sportlaan | 5,000 | Willem Leushuis |
| Jong Groningen | Groningen | Sportpark Corpus den Hoorn | 1,500 | Alfons Arts |
| Harkemase Boys | Harkema | Sportpark De Bosk | 6,000 | Henk Herder |
| Magreb '90 | Utrecht | Sportpark Papendorp | 1,000 | Jamal Yahiaoui |
| ODIN '59 | Heemskerk | Sportpark Assumburg | 3,000 | Richard Plug |
| ONS Sneek | Sneek | Zuidersportpark | 3,150 | Richard Karrenbelt |
| Quick Boys | Katwijk aan Zee | Sportpark Nieuw Zuid | 8,200 | Jan Zoutman |
| Scheveningen | Scheveningen | Sportpark Houtrust | 3,000 | John Blok |
| SV Spakenburg | Spakenburg | Sportpark De Westmaat | 8,000 | John de Wolf |
| VV Spijkenisse | Spijkenisse | Sportpark Jaap Riedijk | 3,500 | Peter Wubben |
| Jong FC Twente | Hengelo | FC Twente-trainingscentrum | 1,000 | Paul Bosvelt |
| Jong Volendam | Volendam | Kras Stadion | 7,164 | Berry Smit |
| VVOG | Harderwijk | Sportpark De Strokel | 10,000 | Ed Engelkes |

=== Sunday league ===
| Club | Location | Venue | Capacity | Manager |
|---|---|---|---|---|
| ADO '20 | Heemskerk | Sportpark De Vlotter | 1,100 | Thijs Sluijter |
| Be Quick 1887 | Haren | Stadion Esserberg | 12,000 | Mischa Visser |
| Blauw Geel '38 | Veghel | PWA Sportpark | 2,500 | Erwin van Breugel |
| Jong De Graafschap | Varsselder | De Buitenham | 1,500 | Richard Roelofsen |
| VV Dongen | Dongen | Sportpark De Biezen | 1,800 | Ron Timmers |
| EVV | Echt | Sportpark In de Bandert | 2,000 | Leo Beckers |
| HBS Craeyenhout | Den Haag | Sportpark Daal en Bergselaan | 1,000 | Marcel Koning |
| USV Hercules | Utrecht | Sportpark Voordorp | 800 | Erik Speelziek |
| HSC '21 | Haaksbergen | Groot Scholtenhagen | 4,500 | Eddy Boerhof |
| JVC Cuijk | Cuijk | Sportpark De Groenendijkse | 3,000 | Ruud Kaiser |
| VV De Meern | Utrecht | Sportpark De Meern | 2,000 | Joël Titaley |
| OFC | Oostzaan | Sportpark OFC | 1,500 | Imdat Ilgüy |
| OJC Rosmalen | Rosmalen | Sportpark De Groote Wielen | 3,000 | David Vecht |
| Quick '20 | Oldenzaal | Vondersweijde | 7,000 | René Nijhuis |
| Quick (H) | Den Haag | Sportpark Nieuw Hanenburg | 1,500 | Paul van der Zwaan |
| VV UNA | Veldhoven | Sportpark Zeelst | 1,000 | Mark Schenning |
| Jong Vitesse | Arnhem | NSC Papendal | 2,000 | Joseph Oosting |
| RKVV Westlandia | Naaldwijk | Sportpark De Hoge Bomen | 4,000 | Edwin Grünholz |

== League tables ==
=== Saturday league ===
| Pos | Team | Pld | W | D | L | GF | GA | GD | Pts | Promotion, qualification or relegation |
|---|---|---|---|---|---|---|---|---|---|---|
| 1 | SV Spakenburg (C, P) | 34 | 22 | 5 | 7 | 68 | 32 | +36 | 71 | Promotion to Tweede Divisie |
| 2 | Scheveningen (Note: Winner of the Second Period (games 13-23).) (O, P) | 34 | 20 | 5 | 9 | 68 | 44 | +24 | 65 | Qualification to promotion play-offs |
| 3 | DVS '33 | 34 | 19 | 5 | 10 | 74 | 37 | +37 | 62 | |
| 4 | Jong Almere City (Note: Winner of the First Period (games 1-12).) (O, P) | 34 | 18 | 7 | 9 | 73 | 54 | +19 | 61 | Qualification to promotion play-offs |
| 5 | Jong Groningen | 34 | 17 | 7 | 10 | 72 | 34 | +38 | 58 | |
| 6 | Quick Boys | 34 | 18 | 4 | 12 | 63 | 45 | +18 | 58 | |
| 7 | Jong Volendam (Note: Winner of the Third Period (games 24-34).) | 34 | 18 | 2 | 14 | 60 | 48 | +12 | 56 | Qualification to promotion play-offs |
| 8 | ODIN '59 | 34 | 14 | 7 | 13 | 56 | 51 | +5 | 49 | |
| 9 | DOVO | 34 | 13 | 10 | 11 | 54 | 52 | +2 | 49 | |
| 10 | Jong Twente | 34 | 14 | 6 | 14 | 52 | 45 | +7 | 48 | |
| 11 | ASWH | 34 | 12 | 11 | 11 | 52 | 51 | +1 | 47 | |
| 12 | Harkemase Boys | 34 | 14 | 4 | 16 | 55 | 56 | −1 | 46 | |
| 13 | VVOG | 34 | 11 | 9 | 14 | 36 | 51 | −15 | 42 | |
| 14 | ONS Sneek | 34 | 10 | 7 | 17 | 62 | 88 | −26 | 37 | |
| 15 | Capelle (R) | 34 | 9 | 8 | 17 | 44 | 57 | −13 | 35 | Qualification to relegation play-offs |
| 16 | VV Spijkenisse (R) | 34 | 7 | 12 | 15 | 56 | 83 | −27 | 33 | Qualification to relegation play-offs |
| 17 | ACV (R) | 34 | 9 | 5 | 20 | 57 | 83 | −26 | 32 | Relegation to Hoofdklasse |
| 18 | Magreb '90 (Note: Magreb '90 were deducted three points for no certified youth training and not having three registered contracted players. They were deducted an additional point for still not meeting the same criteria on February 8, 2018. On top on that they were deducted three more points for not meeting the criteria regarding the annual financial report.) (R) | 34 | 2 | 4 | 28 | 31 | 122 | −91 | 3 | Relegation to Hoofdklasse |

Source: Soccerway
Rules for classification: 1) points; 2) goal difference; 3) number of goals scored
(C) Champions; (O) Play-off winners; (P) Promoted; (R) Relegated

=== Sunday league ===
| Pos | Team | Pld | W | D | L | GF | GA | GD | Pts | Promotion, qualification or relegation |
|---|---|---|---|---|---|---|---|---|---|---|
| 1 | Jong Vitesse (Note: Winner of the Third Period (games 24-34).) (C, P) | 34 | 23 | 6 | 5 | 96 | 36 | +60 | 75 | Promotion to Tweede Divisie |
| 2 | UNA (Note: Winner of the First Period (games 1-12).) | 34 | 22 | 5 | 7 | 74 | 38 | +36 | 71 | Qualification to promotion play-offs |
| 3 | Quick (H) (Note: Substitute winner of the Third Period (games 24-34).) | 34 | 18 | 9 | 7 | 74 | 58 | +16 | 63 | Qualification to promotion play-offs |
| 4 | Dongen | 34 | 17 | 4 | 13 | 61 | 65 | −4 | 55 | |
| 5 | Westlandia | 34 | 17 | 3 | 14 | 77 | 74 | +3 | 54 | |
| 6 | OFC (Note: OFC were deducted one point for not supplying the annual report in time.) | 34 | 14 | 11 | 9 | 64 | 47 | +17 | 52 | |
| 7 | ADO '20 | 34 | 14 | 10 | 10 | 76 | 70 | +6 | 52 | |
| 8 | JVC Cuijk (Note: Winner of the Second Period (games 13-23).) | 34 | 15 | 5 | 14 | 60 | 58 | +2 | 50 | Qualification to promotion play-offs |
| 9 | USV Hercules | 34 | 14 | 7 | 13 | 63 | 59 | +4 | 49 | |
| 10 | Blauw Geel '38 | 34 | 14 | 5 | 15 | 60 | 62 | −2 | 47 | |
| 11 | OJC Rosmalen | 34 | 14 | 5 | 15 | 52 | 61 | −9 | 47 | |
| 12 | HBS Craeyenhout | 34 | 11 | 7 | 16 | 43 | 43 | 0 | 40 | |
| 13 | EVV | 34 | 11 | 6 | 17 | 32 | 48 | −16 | 39 | |
| 14 | HSC '21 | 34 | 11 | 5 | 18 | 44 | 57 | −13 | 38 | |
| 15 | Quick '20 (O) | 34 | 11 | 5 | 18 | 52 | 67 | −15 | 38 | Qualification to relegation play-offs |
| 16 | Be Quick 1887 (R) | 34 | 9 | 6 | 19 | 61 | 85 | −24 | 33 | Qualification to relegation play-offs |
| 17 | Jong De Graafschap (R) | 34 | 8 | 8 | 18 | 48 | 61 | −13 | 32 | Relegation to Hoofdklasse |
| 18 | De Meern (R) | 34 | 6 | 7 | 21 | 28 | 76 | −48 | 25 | Relegation to Hoofdklasse |

Source: Soccerway
Rules for classification: 1) points; 2) goal difference; 3) number of goals scored
(C) Champions; (O) Play-off winners; (P) Promoted; (R) Relegated

== Promotion/relegation play-offs Tweede and Derde Divisie ==
The numbers 15 and 16 from the 2017–18 Tweede Divisie and 3 (substitute) period winners of each of the 2017–18 Derde Divisie's, making a total of 8 teams, decide in a 2-round knockout system which 2 teams will play next season in the 2018–19 Tweede Divisie. The remaining 6 teams will play next season in the 2018–19 Derde Divisie.

=== Qualified Teams ===
| Club | Qualification |
|---|---|
| Lisse | 15th in the Tweede Divisie |
| TEC | 16th in the Tweede Divisie |
| Jong Almere City | Winner of the First Period in the Derde Divisie Saturday |
| Scheveningen | Winner of the Second Period in the Derde Divisie Saturday |
| Jong Volendam | Winner of the Third Period in the Derde Divisie Saturday |
| UNA | Winner of the First Period in the Derde Divisie Sunday |
| JVC Cuijk | Winner of the Second Period in the Derde Divisie Sunday |
| Quick (H) | 3rd in the Derde Divisie Sunday (Third Period won by the league champions) |

=== Results ===
First round
A
Jong Almere City (pen. 3–1) | 1 | 1 | 2
UNA | 1 | 1 | 2
B
JVC Cuijk | 0 | 3 | 3
Lisse | 2 | 0 | 2
C
Quick (H) | 1 | 0 | 1
Scheveningen | 1 | 1 | 2
D
Jong Volendam | 1 | 0 | 1
TEC | 2 | 1 | 3

Final round
E
Jong Almere City | 2 | 3 | 5
JVC Cuijk | 1 | 1 | 2
F
Scheveningen | 2 | 1 | 3
TEC | 0 | 2 | 2

Jong Almere City and Scheveningen promoted to the 2018–19 Tweede Divisie.
Lisse and TEC relegated to the 2018–19 Derde Divisie.
The other teams remain in the 2018–19 Derde Divisie.

=== First round ===
==== Match A ====
| 30 May 2018 First leg | Jong Almere City | 1–1 | UNA | Almere |
| | Khalid Tadmine 22' | | 62' (pen.) Mart van de Gevel | Stadium: Yanmar Stadion; Attendance: 350; Referee: Wim Bronsvoort |

| 2 June 2018 Second leg | UNA | 1–1 (2–2 agg.) (3–1 p) | Jong Almere City | Veldhoven |
| | Brian Boogers 71' | | 48' Goselink | Stadium: Sportpark Zeelst; Attendance: 550; Referee: Robin Gansner |
| | Penalties |
| | (penalty missed) Brian Boogers; (penalty scored) Jeroen Stottelaar; (penalty missed) Bassou Boulghalgh; (penalty missed) Nick Tielemans | | Krant (penalty scored); Balker (penalty scored); Adrian Ramadani (penalty scored) |

==== Match B ====
| 30 May 2018 First leg | JVC Cuijk | 0–2 | Lisse | Cuijk |
| | | | 45' (pen.) Ayoub Ait Afkir; 89' Bas Buimer | Stadium: Sportpark De Groenendijkse; Attendance: 750; Referee: Alex Bos |

| 2 June 2018 Second leg | Lisse | 0–3 (3–2 agg.) | JVC Cuijk | Lisse |
| | | | 20', 68' van der Laan; 90+3' Lars Loermans | Stadium: Sportpark Ter Specke; Attendance: 800; Referee: Frank van den Elzen |

==== Match C ====
| 30 May 2018 First leg | Quick (H) | 1–1 | Scheveningen | Den Haag |
| | Frank van der Heiden 74' | | 66' Tim Peters | Stadium: Sportpark Nieuw Hanenburg; Attendance: 2,500; Referee: Sander de Brito Roque |

| 2 June 2018 Second leg | Scheveningen | 1–0 (1–2 agg.) | Quick (H) | Scheveningen |
| | Barry Rog 27' | | | Stadium: Sportpark Houtrust; Attendance: 3,000; Referee: Sam Dröge |

==== Match D ====
| 30 May 2018 First leg | Jong Volendam | 1–2 | TEC | Volendam |
| | Derry John Murkin 41' | | 85' Brandon Fijneman; 87' (pen.) Serhat Koç | Stadium: Kras Stadion; Attendance: 400; Referee: Jannick van der Laan |

| 2 June 2018 Second leg | TEC | 1–0 (1–3 agg.) | Jong Volendam | Tiel |
| | Sherwin Grot 67' | | | Stadium: Sportpark De Lok; Attendance: 650; Referee: Derya Serik |

=== Final round ===
==== Match E ====
| 6 June 2018 First leg | Jong Almere City | 2–1 | JVC Cuijk | Almere |
| | Khalid Tadmine 4'; Julian Nak 10' | Report | 35' Rik Renirie | Stadium: Yanmar Stadion; Attendance: 350; Referee: Sam Dröge |

| 9 June 2018 Second leg | JVC Cuijk | 1–3 (5–2 agg.) | Jong Almere City | Cuijk |
| | van der Laan 22' (pen.) | Report | 36' (o.g.) Jurre Grotenhuis; 45+1' Mannes; 72' Tarik Evre | Stadium: Sportpark De Groenendijkse; Attendance: 750; Referee: Frank de Winter |

==== Match F ====
| 6 June 2018 First leg | Scheveningen | 2–0 | TEC | Scheveningen |
| | Tim Peters 3'; Kevin Gomez-Nieto 45+2' | Report | | Stadium: Sportpark Houtrust; Attendance: 1,000; Referee: Kevin Puts |

| 9 June 2018 Second leg | TEC | 2–1 (3–2 agg.) | Scheveningen | Tiel |
| | Vinnie Vermeer 30'; Sherwin Grot 43' | Report | 90+1' Leroy Resodihardjo | Stadium: Sportpark De Lok; Attendance: 2,300; Referee: Marc Nagtegaal |

== Promotion/relegation play-offs Derde Divisie and Hoofdklasse ==
The numbers 15 and 16 from the 2017–18 Derde Divisie Saturday league and 3 (substitute) period winners of each of the two 2017–18 Hoofdklasse Saturday leagues, making a total of 8 teams, decide in a 2-round knockout system which 2 teams play next season in the 2018–19 Derde Divisie Saturday league. The remaining 6 teams play next season in the 2018–19 Hoofdklasse Saturday leagues.

The same applies for the 2017–18 Derde Divisie Sunday league and each of the two 2017–18 Hoofdklasse Sunday leagues.

See Promotion/relegation play-offs Derde Divisie and Hoofdklasse on the Hoofdklasse page
