= Dominggus Lim-Duan =

Dutch footballer

Personal information
- Full name: Dominggus Yoenoes Roberto Lim-Duan
- Date of birth: 15 May 1983 (age 43)
- Place of birth: Zwolle, Netherlands
- Height: 1.66 m (5 ft 5 in)
- Position: Midfielder

Team information
- Current team: Zwolsche Boys

Senior career*
Years	Team	Apps	(Gls)
2001–2005	Zwolle	148	(24)
2005–2006	Excelsior	14	(0)
2006–2008	Eindhoven	29	(3)
2008–2011	Zwolle	19	(2)
2011–2012	WHC Wezep	2	(0)
2012–2017	Dieze West		
2017–	Zwolsche Boys		
- * Club domestic league appearances and goals as of 21:13, 8 February 2021 (UTC)

Dominggus Yoenoes Roberto Lim-Duan (born 15 May 1983) is a Dutch footballer who plays as a midfielder for Zwolsche Boys.

== Career ==
=== Professional ===
Born in Zwolle, Lim-Duan began his career with his hometown club FC Zwolle in 2001. After leaving in 2005, short spells at both Excelsior and Eindhoven followed. While playing for Eindhoven, Lim-Duan was removed from the squad by head coach Louis Coolen on 6 September 2007 because of overweight. He was given two months to get back in shape physically. However, he was already part of the squad that played against AGOVV (2–0 loss) on 19 October, and came on as a substitute about fifteen minutes before time.

Lim-Duan returned to Zwolle on 28 May 2008. On 26 July, manager Jan Everse announced that he had temporarily demoted Lim-Duan from the first-team squad due to overweight. On 29 July 2009, Lim-Duan broke his arm in an exhibition game against Regioteam Garderen. Lim-Duan lost control and tried to break the fall with his arm, leaving him with an open fracture. He was sidelined for a substantial period of time. In October 2009, it appeared that the fracture had not healed. With the help of an external construction it was hoped to repair the fracture. In December 2009, this did not bring the hoped-for result either. Lim-Duan was able to recover through a third surgery in which a piece of bone was removed from his hip. After almost a year, the surgery finally brought the desired result. After preparing for the upcoming 2010–11 season, Lim-Duan suffered a hamstring injury, ankle irritation and minor discomfort. Lim-Duan had an inguinal hernia on the right side. His contract was not renewed in 2011.

=== Lower leagues ===
In the 2011–12 season Lim-Duan played for WHC Wezep in the Hoofdklasse. For the club from Wezep, Lim-Duan played a total of 22 minutes in competition. He began playing for Dieze West in 2012, helping lead the team to the Hoofdklasse after two promotions in three years. Lim-Duan left the club when its first team folded in 2017, instead opting to sign with Derde Klasse club Zwolsche Boys.

== Managerial career ==
In 2013, Lim-Duan returned to PEC Zwolle as an assistant youth coach while playing lower league football for Dieze West.

== Personal life ==
Lim-Duan is of Indonesian descent. In November 2010, he joined a team of Dutch players with Indonesian background – including the likes of Jhon van Beukering – in a promotional tour in Indonesia under head coach Stanley Brard.
