= Anco Jansen =

Dutch footballer

Personal information
- Date of birth: 9 March 1989 (age 37)
- Place of birth: Zwolle, Netherlands
- Height: 1.86 m (6 ft 1 in)
- Position: Forward

Team information
- Current team: Dieze West

Youth career
- SVI
- Zwolle

Senior career*
Years	Team	Apps	(Gls)
2005–2008	Zwolle	40	(2)
2008	Groningen	0	(0)
2008–2009	Cambuur	5	(0)
2009–2012	Veendam	77	(28)
2012–2014	De Graafschap	55	(34)
2014–2015	Roda JC	23	(4)
2015–2017	Boluspor	51	(9)
2017–2021	Emmen	82	(11)
2021	NAC Breda	15	(0)
2021–2022	PSM Makassar	20	(5)
2022–2023	DZOH	0	(0)
2025–	Dieze West	0	(0)
- * Club domestic league appearances and goals as of 19 February 2022

Anco Jansen (born 9 March 1989) is a Dutch professional footballer who plays as a forward for Eerste Klasse club Dieze West. He formerly played for Zwolle, Groningen, Cambuur, Veendam, De Graafschap, Roda JC and Emmen.

== Club career ==
=== PSM Makassar ===
On 20 June 2021, Jansen moved to Indonesia and signed one-year contract with Liga 1 side PSM Makassar. He made his league debut on 5 September by starting in a 1–1 draw against Arema.

He became the most expensive foreign player in the Liga 1. Jansen is estimated to be worth €400,000. His presence shifted Marc Klok who previously held the title of the most expensive player. On 18 September 2021, Jansen scored his first league goal for PSM with a brace in 2021-22 Liga 1, earning them a 3–1 win over Persebaya Surabaya.
