= Sam Krant =

Dutch footballer

Personal information
- Full name: Sam Pieter Krant
- Date of birth: 24 May 1998 (age 28)
- Place of birth: Netherlands
- Height: 1.79 m (5 ft 10 in)
- Position: Defensive midfielder

Team information
- Current team: Sparta Nijkerk
- Number: 6

Youth career
- 2014–2017: Almere City

Senior career*
Years	Team	Apps	(Gls)
2017–2020	Jong Almere City	67	(4)
2018–2020	Almere City	1	(0)
2020–	Sparta Nijkerk	83	(1)
- * Club domestic league appearances and goals as of 5 August 2025

Sam Pieter Krant (born 24 May 1998) is a Dutch footballer who plays as a midfielder for Sparta Nijkerk.

== Club career ==
He made his Eerste Divisie debut for Almere City on 21 September 2018 in a game against Den Bosch, as an 83rd-minute substitute for Niek Vossebelt.
