= Marcel Koning =

Dutch footballer and manager (born 1975)

Personal information
- Date of birth: 14 January 1975 (age 51)
- Place of birth: The Hague, Netherlands
- Height: 1.92 m (6 ft 4 in)
- Position: Midfielder

Youth career
- SVV Scheveningen
- Feyenoord

Senior career*
Years	Team	Apps	(Gls)
1992–1995	ADO Den Haag	59	(12)
1995–2002	NEC	155	(9)
2002–2005	NAC Breda	19	(1)
2005–2009	HBS		
Total		233	(22)

Managerial career
- 2007–2008: HBS (U19)
- 2008–2009: HBS (U17)
- 2011–2012: ADO Den Haag (U19)
- 2012–2013: ADO Den Haag (U16)
- 2013–2015: Feyenoord (U16)
- 2015–2016: Feyenoord (U19)
- 2016–2019: HBS Craeyenhout
- 2019–2021: Westlandia
- 2022–2025: Die Haghe
- * Club domestic league appearances and goals

Marcel Koning (born 14 January 1975) is a Dutch football manager and former player who was most recently the head coach of Die Haghe.

== Playing career ==
Koning played for the Dutch professional football clubs ADO Den Haag, NEC and NAC Breda between 1992 and 2005.

== Managerial career ==
In 2005, he joined HBS where he also managed the U19 and U19 teams of the club. In 2009, he joined ADO Den Haag as a youth coach. He was the manager of the U19 team in the 2011/12 season while he took charge of the U16's in the following season.

In 2013, he became manager of Feyenoord's U16 team which he was for two season, alongside a position as assistant manager for the senior reserve team in the 2014/15 season. In the 2015/16 season, he managed the club's U19 team.

In June 2016, he became manager of his former Derde Divisie club, HBS. In January 2019 it was confirmed, that Koning would take charge of RKVV Westlandia from the upcoming 2019–20 season.
