= HVCH =

- Full name: Heesche Voetbal Club Heesch
- Founded: 10 September 1932
colours

Heesche Voetbal Club Heesch (HVCH) is an association football club from Heesch, Netherlands. It was founded on 10 September 1932. Since 2022 it plays for the first time in HVCH's history in the Vierde Divisie (when it won the promotion still known as Hoofdklasse).

== History ==
From 1947 to 1957, HVCH played in the Vierde Klasse. From 1968 to 2006 it hovered between the Vierde and Derde Klasse. Between 2006 and 2010, HVCH played mostly in the Tweede Klasse. From 2010 to 2022, it played in the Eerste Klasse.

=== Section championships ===
- Vierde Klasse: 1970, 1979, 1985, 1989, 1999
- Tweede Klasse: 2008, 2010
- Eerste Klasse: 2022
