= 2017–18 Tweede Divisie =

Tweede Divisie
- Season: 2017–18
- Champions: Katwijk
- Promoted: No team promoted.
- Relegated: Achilles '29; De Dijk; Lisse; TEC
- Matches: 306
- Goals: 1,012 (3.31 per match)

The 2017–18 Tweede Divisie season is the second edition of the Dutch third tier since on hiatus from 1970-71 season and the 17th edition using Tweede Divisie name. Thirteen teams competed from the last season along with one relegated team from the Eerste Divisie and four promoted teams from the Derde Divisie.

At an extraordinary KNVB federation meeting on 2 October 2017, representatives of the amateur and professional football reached an agreement about the route to be taken to renew the football pyramid. Part of this agreement was that no promotion/relegation will take place between the Eerste and Tweede Divisie for the current season.

== Teams ==
(R)
Location of teams in the Tweede Divisie 2017-18

Club	City	2016–17 season
Achilles '29	Groesbeek	(D1) 20th
Excelsior Maassluis	Maassluis	5th
HHC	Hardenberg	14th
Katwijk	Katwijk	3rd
Kozakken Boys	Werkendam	2nd
Barendrecht	Barendrecht	8th
GVVV	Veenendaal	10th
Lienden	Lienden	6th
TEC	Tiel	12th
VVSB	Noordwijkerhout	9th
Koninklijke HFC	Haarlem	13th
De Treffers	Groesbeek	4th
AFC	Amsterdam	11th
Jong Sparta	Rotterdam	7th
IJsselmeervogels	Spakenburg	(D3) Sat, 1st
ASV De Dijk	Amsterdam	(D3) Sun, 1st
Rijnsburgse Boys	Rijnsburg	(D3) Promotion playoff winner
Lisse	Lisse	(D3) Promotion playoff winner

== Standings ==
Pos	Team	Pld	W	D	L	GF	GA	GD	Pts	Promotion, qualification or relegation
1	Katwijk (C)	34	23	3	8	67	33	+34	72	Champion
2	Kozakken Boys	34	21	7	6	74	34	+40	70	
3	HHC	34	18	5	11	77	56	+21	59	
4	Barendrecht	34	18	5	11	64	57	+7	59	
5	Rijnsburgse Boys	34	17	5	12	60	63	−3	56	
6	GVVV	34	16	6	12	54	44	+10	54	
7	Excelsior Maassluis	34	13	12	9	43	30	+13	51	
8	VVSB	34	14	9	11	47	54	−7	51	
9	IJsselmeervogels	34	13	10	11	59	45	+14	49	
10	Koninklijke HFC	34	13	9	12	55	46	+9	48	
11	Jong Sparta	34	12	7	15	72	64	+8	43	
12	AFC	34	12	7	15	45	56	−11	43	
13	De Treffers	34	11	8	15	51	55	−4	41	
14	Lienden	34	12	5	17	52	67	−15	41	
15	Lisse (R)	34	12	4	18	48	57	−9	40	Qualification to relegation play-offs
16	TEC (R)	34	11	5	18	53	66	−13	38	Qualification to relegation play-offs
17	ASV De Dijk (R)	34	10	0	24	50	85	−35	30	Relegation to Derde Divisie
18	Achilles '29 (Note: On 24 January 2018 Achilles '29 were deducted one point for not having their budget for the 2017/2018 season in order. On 16 March 2018 they were deducted another 3 points for failing to pay employees, 1 point for failing to pay the Tax and Customs Administration and another point for owing money to another club.) (R)	34	5	3	26	41	100	−59	12	Relegation to Derde Divisie

Source: Soccerway
Rules for classification: 1) points; 2) goal difference; 3) number of goals scored
(C) Champions; (R) Relegated

== Attendances ==
#	Club	Average
1	IJsselmeervogels	1,659
2	Katwijk	1,414
3	Kozakken Boys	1,291
4	Rijnsburgse Boys	1,259
5	HHC	1,237
6	GVVV	959
7	VVSB	918
8	Lisse	903
9	De Treffers	751
10	Achilles '29	699
11	TEC	676
12	Excelsior Maassluis	675
13	Lienden	666
14	Barendrecht	653
15	HFC	441
16	AFC	369
17	De Dijk	297
18	Jong Sparta	245
