= Sport Vereniging Langbroek =

Dutch sports club

Sport Vereniging Langbroek (commonly abbreviated to SVL that is also used by a Lelystad club) is a multi-sports club in Langbroek, Netherlands. It was founded on 20 Juni 1961. The club has branches of badminton, gymnastics, tennis, and association football. Its home is at Sportpark Oranjehof.

== History ==
In 2010 the first football squad promoted to the Eerste Klasse. It participated in the national 2013–14 KNVB Cup, where it lost 3–2 against EHC Hoensbroek in the extension. In 2015 SVL won a section championship, upon which it promoted to the Hoofdklasse. A year later it relegated back to the Eerste Klasse. Manager is Aad van van den Berg who is leaving in the summer of 2020.
