= Jan Zoutman =

Dutch football manager

Jan Zoutman (Woerden, 1 August 1969) is a Dutch football coach with a UEFA PRO license. He is the coach of VV Katwijk in the Tweede Divisie and also teaches coaching at the KNVB.

== Coaching career ==
Zoutman coaches since 1987, first youth while playing in SV Argon seniors, then teams in nominal amateur leagues, except for the seasons 2007–2009 with HFC Haarlem and 2013–2014 with Jong FC Twente in the full pro Eerste Divisie. Zoutman won the national Rinus Michels Award and the national amateur championship while coaching SV Argon. He also won the national championship for amateurs with IJsselmeervogels. In October 2018 he replaced Jack van den Berg as manager of VV Katwijk.

Season	Club	Country	League	Games	Won	Even	Lost
2004–2007	SV Argon	Netherlands	Hoofdklasse	90	60	15	15
2007–2009	HFC Haarlem	Netherlands	Eerste Divisie	76	20	19	37
2010–2011	IJsselmeervogels	Netherlands	Hoofdklasse	20	18	1	1
2011–2013	IJsselmeervogels	Netherlands	Topklasse	87	45	14	28
2013–2015	Jong FC Twente	Netherlands	Eerste Divisie	-	-	-	-
2015–2017	Quick Boys	Netherlands	Hoofdklasse	-	-	-	-
2018–2020	VV Katwijk	Netherlands	Tweede Divisie	-	-	-	-
Totals				273	143	49	81
