= SDV Barneveld =

Dutch football club

- Full name: Sterk Door Vriendschap Barneveld
- Founded: 24 March 1954; 71 years ago
- Ground: Sportpark Norschoten, Barneveld
- Chairman: Bernard Schermers
- Manager: Dick Kooijman
- League: Vierde Divisie
- 2022–23: Saturday Vierde Divisie B, 11th of 16
- Website: http://www.sdvb.nl/
Home colours

SDV Barneveld, sometimes shortened to SDVB, is a Dutch association football club from the Barneveld, Gelderland. They are currently members of the Vierde Divisie, the fifth tier of the Dutch football league system, and play their home matches at Sportpark Norschoten.
