= ASV Dronten =

Dutch football club

- Full name: Algemene Sport Vereniging Dronten
- Founded: 25 June 1962
- Ground: Burgemeester Dekker sportpark, Dronten
- League: Eerste Klasse Saturday (2018–19)
- Website: http://www.asvdronten.nl/
Home colours

ASV Dronten is a football club from Dronten, Flevoland, Netherlands. In the 2018–19 season, ASV Dronten will be playing in the Saturday Eerste Klasse East (Zaterdag Eerste Klasse D Oost) for the second season, having been relegated after the 2016–17 season, from the Hoofdklasse.

== Famous (ex) players ==
- Hakim Ziyech
