= VV Chevremont =

Dutch football club

- Full name: Voetbalvereniging Chevremont
- Founded: 24 June 1910; 114 years ago
- Ground: Sportpark Kaffeberg, Kerkrade
- Capacity: 1,000
- Chairman: Rik Engelenburg
- Manager: René Trost
- League: Eerste Klasse
- 2023–24: Eerste Klasse F South 2, 8th of 12
- Website: vvchevremont.nl
Home colours

Voetbalvereniging Chevremont is a football club based in Kerkrade, Limburg, Netherlands. The team plays in the Eerste Klasse, the sixth tier of Dutch football, following relegation from the Hoofdklasse in the 2016–17 Hoofdklasse season. The club plays its home games at Sportpark Kaffeberg, Chevremont, a former town which has merged with Kerkrade.

In the 1950–51 and 1951–52 seasons, Chevremont competed at the top level of Dutch football.
