= VV Gestel =

Dutch football club

- Full name: Voetbalvereniging Gestel
- Founded: 8 July 2005
- Ground: Sportpark Dommeldal-Zuid, Eindhoven
- League: Eerste Klasse Sunday (2017–18); 2e Klasse South 1 (2025-26)
- Website: http://www.vv-gestel.com/
Home colours

VV Gestel is a football club from Eindhoven, Netherlands. VV Gestel played in the 2017–18 Sunday Eerste Klasse.
