= SC Woezik =

Dutch football club

- Full name: Sportclub Woezik
- Founded: 18 April 1961
- Ground: Sportpark Woezik, Wijchen
- League: Eerste Klasse Sunday C (2019–20)
- Website: http://www.scwoezik.nl/
Home colours

SC Woezik is a football club from Wijchen, Netherlands. SC Woezik plays in the 2020–21 Sunday Eerste Klasse C. Between 2017 and 2019, the club competed in the Hoofdklasse.
