= VV Heerenveen =

Dutch football club

- Full name: Voetbalvereniging Heerenveen
- Founded: 20 July 1920
- Ground: Skoatterwald, Heerenveen
- League: Tweede Klasse Saturday I (2025–26)
- Website: http://www.vvheerenveen.nl/
Home colours

VV Heerenveen is a football club from Heerenveen, Netherlands. VV Heerenveen plays in the 2017–18 Sunday Hoofdklasse A.
