= Dieze West =

Dutch football club

- Full name: Voetbalvereniging Dieze West
- Founded: 11 November 1982
- Ground: Sportpark Het Hoge Laar, Zwolle
- Manager: Tom IJzerman
- League: Eerste Klasse Sunday (2017–18)
- Website: http://www.diezewest.nl/
Home colours

Dieze West is a football club from Zwolle, Netherlands.

== History ==
During the years 2015–2017, Dieze West played in Sunday Hoofdklasse. Since 2017, it plays in the Saturday Vierde Klasse.
