= Juliana '31 =

Dutch football club

- Full name: Sportvereniging Juliana '31
- Founded: 6 August 1931
- Ground: De Broeklanden, Malden
- Chairman: Martien te Riele
- Manager: Arnold Brehler
- League: Hoofdklasse Sunday A (2019–20)
Home colours

Juliana '31 is a football club from Malden, Netherlands.

Juliana was promoted to Topklasse in 2012–13 after winning the promotion/relegation play-offs. It returned to the Hoofdklasse through relegation after only one season. In 2015–16 it returned to the renamed Derde Divisie by winning Hoofdklasse C. In 2017–18 it played in the Sunday Hoofdklasse B, relegated the next season to Eerste Klasse, to return a season later to the Hoofdklasse.
