= 2021–22 in Dutch football =

Football in Netherlands
- Season: 2021–22

Men's football
- Eredivisie: Ajax
- Eerste Divisie: FC Emmen
- KNVB Cup: PSV
- Johan Cruyff Shield: PSV

The 2021–22 season is the 132nd season of competitive football in the Netherlands.

== League season ==
=== Eredivisie ===
Pos	Team	Pld	W	D	L	GF	GA	GD	Pts	Qualification or relegation
1	Ajax (C)	34	26	5	3	98	19	+79	83	Qualification for the Champions League group stage
2	PSV Eindhoven	34	26	3	5	86	42	+44	81	Qualification for the Champions League third qualifying round
3	Feyenoord	34	22	5	7	76	34	+42	71	Qualification for the Europa League group stage (Note: Since the winners of the 2021–22 KNVB Cup, PSV, qualified for the Champions League based on their league position, the Europa League play-off berth awarded to the KNVB Cup winners was transferred to the third-placed team Feyenoord, the highest-placed team not qualified for the Champions League. Feyenoord qualified for the Europa League group stage as their opponent in the 2022 UEFA Europa Conference League final, Roma, qualified to the Europa League group stage through domestic performance by finishing sixth in the Serie A.)
4	Twente	34	20	8	6	55	37	+18	68	Qualification for the Europa Conference League third qualifying round
5	AZ (O)	34	18	7	9	64	44	+20	61	Qualification for the European competition play-offs
6	Vitesse	34	15	6	13	42	51	−9	51	Qualification for the European competition play-offs
7	Utrecht	34	12	11	11	51	46	+5	47	Qualification for the European competition play-offs
8	Heerenveen	34	11	8	15	37	50	−13	41	Qualification for the European competition play-offs
9	Cambuur	34	11	6	17	53	70	−17	39	
10	RKC Waalwijk	34	9	11	14	40	51	−11	38	
11	NEC	34	10	8	16	38	52	−14	38	
12	Groningen	34	9	9	16	41	55	−14	36	
13	Go Ahead Eagles	34	10	6	18	37	51	−14	36	
14	Sparta Rotterdam	34	8	11	15	30	48	−18	35	
15	Fortuna Sittard	34	10	5	19	36	67	−31	35	
16	Heracles Almelo (R)	34	9	7	18	33	49	−16	34	Qualification for the Relegation play-offs
17	Willem II (R)	34	9	6	19	32	57	−25	33	Relegation to Eerste Divisie
18	PEC Zwolle (R)	34	7	6	21	26	52	−26	27	Relegation to Eerste Divisie

Source: Eredivisie
Rules for classification: Season in progress: 1) Most points won; 2) Less points lost; 3) Goal difference; 4) Goals scored; 5) Alphabetical order; End of season: 1) Points; 2) Goal difference; 3) Goals scored; 4) Head-to-head points; 5) Head-to-head goal difference; 6) Head-to-head away goals scored; 7) Play-off if relevant for deciding champion, relegation or participating in a European league, otherwise by draw. 8) Penalty shoot-out (only after a play-off)
(C) Champions; (O) Play-off winners; (R) Relegated

=== Eerste Divisie ===
Pos	Team	Pld	W	D	L	GF	GA	GD	Pts	Promotion or qualification
1	FC Emmen (Note: Winner of the Third and Fourth Period (Rounds 20–28 and 29–38)) (C, P)	38	26	5	7	64	24	+40	83	Promotion to the Eredivisie
2	FC Volendam (P)	38	21	12	5	81	53	+28	75	Promotion to the Eredivisie
3	FC Eindhoven	38	21	8	9	69	43	+26	71	Qualification to promotion play-offs
4	ADO Den Haag (Note: Winner of the First Period (Rounds 1–9))	38	22	7	9	76	53	+23	67 (Note: ADO Den Haag were deducted a total of six points for breaking the financial standards set by the Royal Dutch Football Association.)	Qualification to promotion play-offs
5	Roda JC Kerkrade	38	18	12	8	77	50	+27	66	Qualification to promotion play-offs
6	Excelsior (Note: Winner of the Second Period (Rounds 10–19)) (O, P)	38	19	9	10	82	57	+25	66	Qualification to promotion play-offs
7	Jong Ajax	38	18	9	11	82	63	+19	63	Reserve teams are not eligible to be promoted to the Eredivisie
8	NAC Breda	38	16	11	11	60	45	+15	59	Qualification to promotion play-offs
9	De Graafschap	38	15	11	12	52	43	+9	56	Qualification to promotion play-offs
10	VVV-Venlo	38	14	6	18	50	64	−14	48	
11	FC Den Bosch	38	14	5	19	42	61	−19	47	
12	Jong PSV	38	11	11	16	61	63	−2	44	Reserve teams are not eligible to be promoted to the Eredivisie
13	Jong AZ	38	12	6	20	39	50	−11	42	Reserve teams are not eligible to be promoted to the Eredivisie
14	Almere City FC	38	11	8	19	57	69	−12	41	
15	TOP Oss	38	11	8	19	48	62	−14	41	
16	MVV Maastricht	38	12	4	22	43	75	−32	40	
17	FC Dordrecht	38	10	9	19	53	77	−24	39	
18	Jong FC Utrecht	38	11	5	22	43	67	−24	38	Reserve teams are not eligible to be promoted to the Eredivisie
19	Telstar	38	8	11	19	47	74	−27	35	
20	Helmond Sport	38	8	7	23	39	72	−33	28 (Note: Helmond Sport were deducted a total of three points for failing to participate in the FC Emmen – Helmond Sport match, which was set on 14 January 2022.)	

Updated to match(es) played on 6 May 2022. Source: Soccerway, Keuken Kampioen Divisie (in Dutch)
Rules for classification: Season in progress: 1) Most points won; 2) Less points lost; 3) Goal difference; 4) Goals scored; 5) Alphabetical order; End of season: 1) Points; 2) Goal difference; 3) Goals scored; 4) Head-to-head points; 5) Head-to-head goal difference; 6) Head-to-head away goals scored; 7) Play-off if relevant for deciding champion, relegation or participating in a European league, otherwise by draw. 8) Penalty shoot-out (only after a play-off)
(C) Champions; (O) Play-off winners; (P) Promoted

=== Tweede Divisie ===
Pos	Team	Pld	W	D	L	GF	GA	GD	Pts	Promotion, qualification or relegation
1	Katwijk (C)	34	22	5	7	73	34	+39	71	
2	HHC Hardenberg	34	19	5	10	58	43	+15	62	
3	Koninklijke HFC	34	16	9	9	54	39	+15	57	
4	Rijnsburgse Boys	34	17	4	13	63	43	+20	55	
5	Jong Sparta	34	16	7	11	57	49	+8	55	
6	AFC	34	15	9	10	61	49	+12	54	
7	Noordwijk	34	16	6	12	53	46	+7	54	
8	Scheveningen	34	13	11	10	43	44	−1	50	
9	SV Spakenburg	34	14	7	13	64	62	+2	49	
10	Excelsior Maassluis	34	14	5	15	50	55	−5	47	
11	Jong Volendam (O)	34	14	3	17	66	65	+1	45	Qualification to U21 relegation play-offs
12	Quick Boys	34	12	8	14	43	53	−10	44	
13	IJsselmeervogels	34	13	3	18	44	48	−4	42	
14	TEC	34	11	9	14	44	63	−19	42	
15	De Treffers	34	12	5	17	38	51	−13	41	
16	Kozakken Boys (O)	34	8	11	15	46	62	−16	35	Qualification to relegation play-offs
17	GVVV (R)	34	9	7	18	45	54	−9	34	Qualification to relegation play-offs
18	ASWH (R)	34	5	6	23	38	80	−42	21	Relegation to Derde Divisie

Source: Flashscore
Rules for classification: Season in progress: 1) Most points won; 2) Less points lost; 3) Goal difference; 4) Goals scored; 5) Alphabetical order; End of season: 1) Points; 2) Goal difference; 3) Goals scored; 4) Head-to-head points; 5) Head-to-head goal difference; 6) Head-to-head away goals scored; 7) Play-off if relevant for deciding champion, relegation or participating in a European league, otherwise by draw. 8) Penalty shoot-out (only after a play-off)
(C) Champions; (O) Play-off winners; (R) Relegated

=== Derde Divisie ===
==== Saturday League ====
Pos	Team	Pld	W	D	L	GF	GA	GD	Pts	Promotion, qualification or relegation
1	Lisse (C, P)	34	21	7	6	70	38	+32	70	Promotion to Tweede Divisie
2	Sparta Nijkerk (Note: Winner of the Second Period (Rounds 13–23))	34	19	7	8	65	38	+27	64	Qualification to promotion play-offs
3	Sportlust '46 (Note: Winner of the First Period (Rounds 1–12))	34	17	7	10	63	40	+23	58	Qualification to promotion play-offs
4	DVS '33 (Note: Winner of the Third Period (Rounds 24–34))	34	18	4	12	61	41	+20	58	Qualification to promotion play-offs
5	Hoek	34	16	7	11	53	49	+4	55	
6	ACV	34	14	9	11	50	42	+8	51	
7	Excelsior '31	34	14	9	11	53	47	+6	51	
8	Barendrecht	34	13	11	10	72	57	+15	50	
9	SteDoCo	34	12	9	13	49	48	+1	45	
10	Staphorst	34	13	6	15	54	56	−2	45	
11	Ter Leede	34	13	5	16	49	67	−18	44	
12	Harkemase Boys	34	10	12	12	63	62	+1	42	
13	DOVO	34	10	8	16	43	57	−14	38	
14	VVSB	34	10	8	16	50	66	−16	38	
15	ODIN '59 (R)	34	9	10	15	52	68	−16	37	Qualification to relegation play-offs
16	VVOG (O)	34	10	7	17	61	82	−21	37	Qualification to relegation play-offs
17	Ajax (amateurs) (R)	34	10	6	18	38	54	−16	36	Relegation to Hoofdklasse
18	GOES (R)	34	6	10	18	44	78	−34	28	Relegation to Hoofdklasse

Source: Soccerway
Rules for classification: Season in progress: 1) Most points won; 2) Less points lost; 3) Goal difference; 4) Goals scored; 5) Alphabetical order; End of season: 1) Points; 2) Goal difference; 3) Goals scored; 4) Head-to-head points; 5) Head-to-head goal difference; 6) Head-to-head away goals scored; 7) Play-off if relevant for deciding champion, relegation or participating in a European league, otherwise by draw. 8) Penalty shoot-out (only after a play-off)
(C) Champions; (O) Play-off winners; (P) Promoted; (R) Relegated

==== Sunday League ====
Pos	Team	Pld	W	D	L	GF	GA	GD	Pts	Promotion, qualification or relegation
1	OFC (Note: Winner of the First Period (Rounds 1–12)) (C, P)	34	18	7	9	66	47	+19	61	Promotion to Tweede Divisie
2	USV Hercules	34	18	5	11	74	46	+28	59	Qualification to promotion play-offs
3	ADO '20	34	17	7	10	64	46	+18	58	
4	Gemert (Note: Winner of the Second Period (Rounds 13–23))	34	15	12	7	75	57	+18	57	Qualification to promotion play-offs
5	OSS '20	34	16	8	10	62	46	+16	55 (Note: OSS '20 were deducted one point by the Royal Dutch Football Association.)	
6	Groene Ster	34	14	9	11	48	50	−2	51	
7	Dongen	34	13	11	10	56	47	+9	50	
8	UNA	34	15	5	14	60	58	+2	50	
9	HSC '21 (Note: Winner of the Third Period (Rounds 24–34))	34	15	4	15	63	52	+11	49	Qualification to promotion play-offs
10	Quick (H)	34	14	5	15	47	44	+3	47	
11	Blauw Geel '38	34	13	6	15	55	56	−1	45	
12	DEM	34	13	6	15	37	50	−13	45	
13	Unitas	34	12	6	16	41	59	−18	42	
14	JOS Watergraafsmeer	34	12	6	16	59	69	−10	40 (Note: JOS Watergraafsmeer were deducted a total of two points by the Royal Dutch Football Association for failing to report the financial statements over the period 2019–2020 in time.)	
15	Hoogland (R)	34	11	6	17	42	64	−22	39	Qualification to relegation play-offs
16	EVV (R)	34	9	10	15	36	59	−23	37	Qualification to relegation play-offs
17	Hollandia (R)	34	10	5	19	38	55	−17	35	Relegation to Hoofdklasse
18	Westlandia (R)	34	8	8	18	43	61	−18	32	Relegation to Hoofdklasse

Source: Soccerway
Rules for classification: Season in progress: 1) Most points won; 2) Less points lost; 3) Goal difference; 4) Goals scored; 5) Alphabetical order; End of season: 1) Points; 2) Goal difference; 3) Goals scored; 4) Head-to-head points; 5) Head-to-head goal difference; 6) Head-to-head away goals scored; 7) Play-off if relevant for deciding champion, relegation or participating in a European league, otherwise by draw. 8) Penalty shoot-out (only after a play-off)
(C) Champions; (P) Promoted; (R) Relegated

=== Hoofdklasse ===
==== Saturday A League ====
Pos	Team	Pld	W	D	L	GF	GA	GD	Pts	Promotion, qualification or relegation
1	FC Rijnvogels (C, P)	30	20	4	6	78	36	+42	64	Promotion to Derde Divisie
2	SC Feyenoord	30	18	5	7	66	36	+30	59	Qualification to promotion play-offs
3	VV Capelle	30	17	8	5	55	27	+28	59	
4	SV ARC	30	18	2	10	66	34	+32	56	Qualification to promotion play-offs
5	Achilles Veen	30	15	5	10	62	38	+24	50	
6	FC 's-Gravenzande	30	15	4	11	63	53	+10	49	
7	VV Smitshoek	30	14	4	12	46	51	−5	46	
8	SV Poortugaal	30	12	7	11	52	50	+2	43	
9	VV Zwaluwen	30	10	11	9	55	45	+10	41	Qualification to promotion play-offs
10	CVV de Jodan Boys	30	11	6	13	44	42	+2	39	
11	DHSC	30	10	6	14	36	47	−11	36	
12	VV Spijkenisse	30	10	6	14	38	53	−15	36	
13	VV Scherpenzeel (R)	30	11	2	17	58	61	−3	35	Qualification to relegation play-offs
14	VV DUNO (R)	30	9	8	13	42	49	−7	35	Qualification to relegation play-offs
15	Achilles '29 (R)	30	4	5	21	33	89	−56	17	Relegation to Eerste Klasse
16	VV Rijsoord (R)	30	3	3	24	28	111	−83	12	Relegation to Eerste Klasse

Source: Hollandsevelden
Rules for classification: Season in progress: 1) Most points won; 2) Less points lost; 3) Goal difference; 4) Goals scored; 5) Alphabetical order; End of season: 1) Points; 2) Goal difference; 3) Goals scored; 4) Head-to-head points; 5) Head-to-head goal difference; 6) Head-to-head away goals scored; 7) Play-off if relevant for deciding champion, relegation or participating in a European league, otherwise by draw. 8) Penalty shoot-out (only after a play-off)
(C) Champions; (P) Promoted; (R) Relegated

==== Saturday B League ====
Pos	Team	Pld	W	D	L	GF	GA	GD	Pts	Promotion, qualification or relegation
1	Urk (C, P)	30	20	6	4	65	34	+31	66	Promotion to Derde Divisie
2	RKAV Volendam (O, P)	30	19	5	6	74	43	+31	62	Qualification to promotion play-offs
3	Eemdijk	30	18	4	8	70	37	+33	58	Qualification to promotion play-offs
4	Genemuiden	30	18	4	8	66	35	+31	58	Qualification to promotion play-offs
5	DETO Twenterand	30	15	9	6	61	44	+17	54	
6	AZSV	30	14	3	13	45	51	−6	45	
7	Flevo Boys	30	13	3	14	48	52	−4	42	
8	HZVV	30	11	8	11	45	42	+3	41	
9	Berkum	30	10	10	10	40	38	+2	40	
10	Swift	30	10	9	11	58	49	+9	39	
11	Buitenpost	30	10	6	14	33	44	−11	36	
12	ASV De Dijk	30	9	7	14	26	36	−10	34	
13	SDC Putten (R)	30	9	5	16	38	44	−6	32	Qualification to relegation play-offs
14	ONS Sneek (R)	30	9	2	19	50	83	−33	29	Qualification to relegation play-offs
15	NSC (R)	30	5	7	18	26	62	−36	22	Relegation to Eerste Klasse
16	Noordscheschut (R)	30	4	4	22	25	76	−51	16	Relegation to Eerste Klasse

Source: Soccerway
Rules for classification: Season in progress: 1) Most points won; 2) Less points lost; 3) Goal difference; 4) Goals scored; 5) Alphabetical order; End of season: 1) Points; 2) Goal difference; 3) Goals scored; 4) Head-to-head points; 5) Head-to-head goal difference; 6) Head-to-head away goals scored; 7) Play-off if relevant for deciding champion, relegation or participating in a European league, otherwise by draw. 8) Penalty shoot-out (only after a play-off)
(C) Champions; (O) Play-off winners; (P) Promoted; (R) Relegated

==== Sunday A League ====
Pos	Team	Pld	W	D	L	GF	GA	GD	Pts	Promotion, qualification or relegation
1	TOGB (C, P)	28	20	2	6	63	36	+27	62	Promotion to Derde Divisie
2	HBS Craeyenhout	28	18	4	6	65	25	+40	58	Qualification to promotion play-offs
3	Hoogeveen	28	17	5	6	77	40	+37	56	Qualification to promotion play-offs
4	SJC	28	17	4	7	74	47	+27	55	Qualification to promotion play-offs
5	Be Quick 1887	28	15	7	6	66	29	+37	52	
6	RKAVV	28	11	11	6	49	41	+8	44	
7	Purmersteijn	28	9	11	8	56	51	+5	38	
8	Alphense Boys	28	11	5	12	57	65	−8	38	
9	Velsen	28	10	4	14	38	46	−8	34	
10	VOC	28	9	6	13	45	53	−8	33	
11	MVV Alcides	28	7	8	13	48	68	−20	29	
12	De Zouaven	28	7	6	15	46	63	−17	27	
13	TAC '90 (R)	28	8	2	18	41	68	−27	26	Qualification to relegation play-offs
14	SDO (R)	28	5	3	20	29	80	−51	18	Qualification to relegation play-offs
15	VV Emmen (R)	28	3	8	17	26	68	−42	17	Relegation to Eerste Klasse

Source: Soccerway
Rules for classification: Season in progress: 1) Most points won; 2) Less points lost; 3) Goal difference; 4) Goals scored; 5) Alphabetical order; End of season: 1) Points; 2) Goal difference; 3) Goals scored; 4) Head-to-head points; 5) Head-to-head goal difference; 6) Head-to-head away goals scored; 7) Play-off if relevant for deciding champion, relegation or participating in a European league, otherwise by draw. 8) Penalty shoot-out (only after a play-off)
(C) Champions; (P) Promoted; (R) Relegated

==== Sunday B League ====
Pos	Team	Pld	W	D	L	GF	GA	GD	Pts	Promotion, qualification or relegation
1	Baronie (C, P)	26	19	3	4	53	21	+32	60	Promotion to Derde Divisie
2	OJC Rosmalen (O, P)	26	17	3	6	60	33	+27	52	Qualification to promotion play-offs
3	UDI '19 (O, P)	26	15	4	7	41	29	+12	49	Qualification to promotion play-offs
4	Orion	26	15	2	9	51	35	+16	47	Qualification to promotion play-offs
5	Halsteren	26	12	8	6	48	39	+9	44	
6	Juliana '31	26	12	5	9	45	38	+7	41	
7	Nuenen	26	11	4	11	36	31	+5	37	
8	AWC	26	10	3	13	49	50	−1	33	
9	Meerssen	26	9	6	11	40	45	−5	33	
10	Silvolde	26	9	5	12	38	30	+8	32	
11	RKZVC	26	7	6	13	25	44	−19	27	
12	Moerse Boys	26	6	7	13	29	53	−24	22	
13	Longa '30 (O)	26	5	4	17	33	59	−26	19	Qualification to relegation play-offs
14	Minor (R)	26	4	2	20	27	68	−41	14	Qualification to relegation play-offs

Source: Soccerway
Rules for classification: Season in progress: 1) Most points won; 2) Less points lost; 3) Goal difference; 4) Goals scored; 5) Alphabetical order; End of season: 1) Points; 2) Goal difference; 3) Goals scored; 4) Head-to-head points; 5) Head-to-head goal difference; 6) Head-to-head away goals scored; 7) Play-off if relevant for deciding champion, relegation or participating in a European league, otherwise by draw. 8) Penalty shoot-out (only after a play-off)
(C) Champions; (O) Play-off winners; (P) Promoted; (R) Relegated

=== Eredivisie (women) ===
Pos	Team	Pld	W	D	L	GF	GA	GD	Pts	Qualification
1	Twente (C)	24	19	3	2	95	26	+69	60	UEFA Champions League first qualifying round
2	Ajax	24	17	3	4	70	22	+48	54	UEFA Champions League first qualifying round
3	PSV	24	13	4	7	35	29	+6	43	
4	ADO Den Haag	24	11	6	7	49	32	+17	39	
5	Feyenoord	24	10	5	9	32	40	−8	35	
6	PEC Zwolle	24	8	4	12	33	46	−13	28	
7	Heerenveen	24	4	6	14	21	46	−25	18	
8	Alkmaar	24	5	2	17	29	68	−39	17	
9	Excelsior	24	2	5	17	28	83	−55	11	

Source: Soccerway
Rules for classification: Season in progress: 1) Most points won; 2) Less points lost; 3) Goal difference; 4) Goals scored; 5) Alphabetical order; End of season: 1) Points; 2) Goal difference; 3) Goals scored; 4) Head-to-head points; 5) Head-to-head goal difference; 6) Head-to-head away goals scored; 7) Play-off if relevant for deciding champion otherwise by draw. 8) Penalty shoot-out (only after a play-off)
(C) Champions
