= 2026–27 KNVB Cup =

Dutch football tournament season

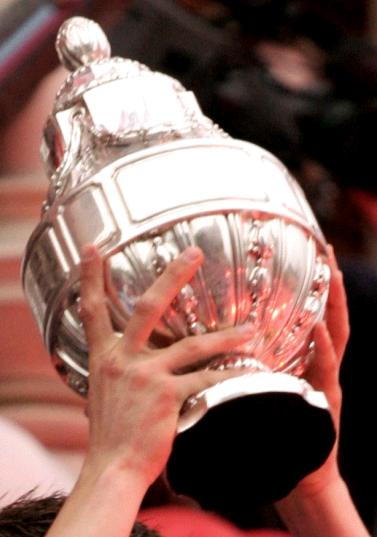
- KNVB Cup trophy

Tournament details
- Country: Netherlands
- Venue(s): De Kuip, Rotterdam
- Dates: 1 September 2026 – 18 April 2027

The 2026–27 KNVB Cup, for sponsoring reasons officially called the Eurojackpot KNVB Beker, is the 109th edition of the Dutch national football annual knockout tournament for the KNVB Cup.

Times up to 24 October 2026 and from 28 March 2027 are CEST (UTC+2). Times from 25 October 2026 to 27 March 2027 are CET (UTC+1).

== Schedule ==
Round	Match Dates
First preliminary round	1–2 September 2026
Second preliminary round	22–23 September 2026
First round	27–29 October 2026
Second round	1–3 & 16–17 December 2026
Round of 16	12–14 January 2027
Quarter-finals	2–4 February 2027
Semi-finals	2–4 March 2027
Final	18 April 2027

== First preliminary round ==
1 September 2026	TEC	4–2	Almkerk	Tiel
20:00

1 September 2026	Sportlust '46	3–1	Blauw Geel '38	Woerden
20:00

1 September 2026	NSVV	2–4	Kloetinge	Numansdorp
20:00

1 September 2026	Longa '30	0–4	Koninklijke HFC	Lichtenvoorde
20:00

1 September 2026	HZVV	0–4	LAC Frisia 1883	Hoogeveen
20:00

1 September 2026	Harkemase Boys	0–1	Excelsior '31	Harkema
20:00

1 September 2026	Genemuiden	2–1	Lisse	Genemuiden
20:00

1 September 2026	Elinkwijk	0–3	Eemdijk	Utrecht
20:00

1 September 2026	Be Quick 1887	0–2	AFC	Groningen
20:00

1 September 2026	AFC '34	4–1	Scherpenzeel	Alkmaar
20:00

1 September 2026	ADO '20	1–1 (a.e.t.) (4–5 p)	Excelsior Maassluis	Heemskerk
20:00

1 September 2026	Achilles Veen	4–2	Poortugaal	Veen
20:00

2 September 2026	VVSB	2–0	Ajax Amateurs	Noordwijkerhout
20:00

2 September 2026	Hercules	1–3	EVV	Utrecht
20:00

2 September 2026	TOGB	3–2 (a.e.t.)	Katwijk	Berkel en Rodenrijs
20:00

2 September 2026	FC Surhústerfean	1–2	DOVO	Surhuisterveen
20:00

2 September 2026	Staphorst	2–2 (a.e.t.) (6–5 p)	UNA	Staphorst
20:00

2 September 2026	Sparta Nijkerk	2–0	Venray	Nijkerk
20:00

2 September 2026	Spartaan '20	0–5	UDI '19	Rotterdam
20:00

2 September 2026	Rijnvogels	5–0	Bennekom	Katwijk
20:00

2 September 2026	Purmersteijn	4–3	RKVV Zwaluw VFC	Purmerend
20:00

2 September 2026	RKSV Mierlo-Hout	2–2 (a.e.t.) (4–5 p)	VV Germania	Mierlo-Hout
20:00

2 September 2026	SV Lierop	0–7	Zwaluwen	Lierop
20:00

2 September 2026	Hollandia	2–2 (a.e.t.) (3–5 p)	Halsteren	Hoorn
20:00

2 September 2026	Hoogeveen	2–2 (a.e.t.) (3–2 p)	Wierden	Hoogeveen
20:00

2 September 2026	GSV '28	0–4	RBC	Genhout
20:00

2 September 2026	Groene Ster	2–1	Heerjansdam	Heerlerheide
20:00

2 September 2026	GOES	0–1	Noordwijk	Goes
20:00

2 September 2026	's-Gravenzande	0–2	Gemert	's-Gravenzande
20:00

2 September 2026	Dongen	2–4	JOS Watergraafsmeer	Dongen
20:00

2 September 2026	ATC '65	1–2	DVS '33	Hengelo
20:00

2 September 2026	ACV	6–1	Westlandia	Assen
20:00

== Second preliminary round ==
22 September 2026	Staphorst	2–3	Genemuiden	Staphorst
20:00

22 September 2026	Sportlust '46	0–2	Excelsior Maassluis	Woerden
20:00

22 September 2026	RKAV Volendam	2–2 (a.e.t.) (4–3 p)	Spakenburg	Volendam
20:00

22 September 2026	Rijnvogels	0–1	VVSB	Katwijk
20:00

22 September 2026	Noordwijk	1–0 (a.e.t.)	LAC Frisia 1883	Noordwijk
20:00

22 September 2026	Kloetinge	8–0	Achilles Veen	Kloetinge
20:00

22 September 2026	Koninklijke HFC	3–1 (a.e.t.)	DOVO	Haarlem
20:00

22 September 2026	HHC Hardenberg	0–1	Barendrecht	Hardenberg
20:00

22 September 2026	GVVV	4–0	DVS '33	Veenendaal
20:00

22 September 2026	Groene Ster	1–6	AFC	Heerlerheide
20:00

22 September 2026	Excelsior '31	4–3	AFC '34	Rijssen
20:00

22 September 2026	EVV	3–1	Halsteren	Echt
20:00

22 September 2026	Eemdijk	2–1	RBC	Bunschoten
20:00

22 September 2026	ACV	2–1	Hoogeveen	Assen
20:00

23 September 2026	JOS Watergraafsmeer	4–4 (a.e.t.) (4–3 p)	TEC	Amsterdam
20:00

23 September 2026	Zwaluwen	0–1	Purmersteijn	Vlaardingen
20:00

23 September 2026	TOGB	4–6	ROHDA Raalte	Berkel en Rodenrijs
20:00

23 September 2026	Sparta Nijkerk	3–1	UDI '19	Groesbeek
20:00

23 September 2026	IJsselmeervogels	0–3	Gemert	Spakenburg
20:00

23 September 2026	VV Germania	1–5	Kozakken Boys	Groesbeek
20:00

== First round ==
The draw for the first round took place on 25 September 2026, with matches being played on 27, 28 and 29 October. Ajax, AZ, Feyenoord, NEC, PSV Eindhoven and Twente are exempt from this round due to their participation in European football.

27 October 2026	Excelsior '31	1–1 (a.e.t.) (6–5 p)	ADO Den Haag	Rijssen
18:45	Schrijver 45+2'		Thomas 57'	Stadium: Sportpark De Koerbelt
	Penalties
	De Jong (penalty missed); Scholten (penalty scored); Schrijver (penalty missed); Lbenay (penalty scored); Ter Haar (penalty scored); Maneschijn (penalty scored); Hofste (penalty scored); Koelman (penalty scored)		(penalty missed) Van Mieghem; (penalty missed) Kilo; (penalty scored) Bal; (penalty scored) Rottier; (penalty scored) Eduardo; (penalty scored) Peupion; (penalty scored) Waem; (penalty missed) Sylla

27 October 2026	Barendrecht	2–2 (a.e.t.) (1–4 p)	RKC Waalwijk	Barendrecht
20:00	Serghini 82'; De Graaf 115'		Fage 67'; Van der Haar 97'	Stadium: Sportpark de Bongerd
	Penalties
	Kieboom (penalty missed); Brand (penalty missed); Van der Meer (penalty scored)		(penalty scored) Kuijpers; (penalty scored) Van Gemert; (penalty scored) Van Galderen; (penalty scored) Postma

27 October 2026	Eindhoven	5–3	Volendam	Eindhoven
20:00	Baartmans 27' (pen.), 64'; Besuijen 32'; Buifrahi 55'; Haakmat 78' (o.g.)		Niemeijer 37', 40'; Belfqih 67'	Stadium: Jan Louwers Stadion

27 October 2026	Helmond Sport	3–4	Willem II	Helmond
20:00	Ludwig 9'; Bajrami 72', 85'		Haen 28'; Gürbüz 40', 42'; Vilhena 53'	Stadium: GS Staalwerken Stadion

27 October 2026	Kloetinge	0–2	Cambuur	Kloetinge
20:00			Bouhoudane 1', 90+3'	Stadium: Sportpark Wesselopark

27 October 2026	Rijnsburgse Boys	3–5	Den Bosch	Rijnsburg
20:00	Lever 14'; Buitenweg 59'; Van Bohemen 78'		De Vries 43'; Hoffman 64'; Wolters 77'; Fortes 83'; De Corte 90+1' (pen.)	Stadium: Sportpark Middelmors

27 October 2026	Roda JC	1–0	De Graafschap	Kerkrade
20:00	Bentoumi 84'			Stadium: Parkstad Limburg Stadion

27 October 2026	Telstar	0–2	Almere City	Velsen-Zuid
20:00			Bijleveld 61'; Ritmeester van de Kamp 80'	Stadium: BUKO Stadion

27 October 2026	Koninklijke HFC	0–5	Go Ahead Eagles	Haarlem
21:00			Meulensteen 32'; Sivertsen 43'; Baeten 63'; Kramer 75'; Galvez 88'	Stadium: Sportpark Spanjaardslaan

28 October 2026	Sparta Rotterdam	2–2 (a.e.t.) (2–3 p)	Fortuna Sittard	Rotterdam
18:45	Zonneveld 15', 90'		Peterson 62'; Zeefuik 67'	Stadium: Het Kasteel
	Penalties
	Zonneveld (penalty scored); Kuipers (penalty scored); Roaldsøy (penalty missed); Young (penalty missed); Kostić (penalty missed)		(penalty scored) Descotte; (penalty missed) Buyukhan; (penalty scored) Hubner; (penalty missed) Van Ottele; (penalty scored) 't Zand

28 October 2026	Genemuiden	3–2	Dordrecht	Genemuiden
20:00	De Lange 10'; Egbers 65', 79'		Mpanzu 42'; Van Asten 55'	Stadium: Sportpark de Wetering

28 October 2026	JOS Watergraafsmeer	1–3	NAC Breda	Amsterdam
20:00	Polm 39'		Misehuoy 29'; Gladon 45+2'; Reulen 73'	Stadium: Sportpark Goed Genoeg (Note: The match between JOS Watergraafsmeer and NAC Breda was played at Sportpark Goed Genoeg, the home of AFC instead of Sportpark Drieburg. Sportpark Drieburg did not fulfill the broadcasting criteria.)

28 October 2026	MVV Maastricht	0–3	Excelsior	Maastricht
20:00			Yegoian 15', 60' (pen.); Sliti 89'	Stadium: Stadion De Geusselt

28 October 2026	PEC Zwolle	1–2	TOP Oss	Zwolle
20:00	Mol 18' (o.g.)		Vianello 34'; Hinoke 50'	Stadium: MAC³PARK Stadion

28 October 2026	Quick Boys	4–0	Eemdijk	Katwijk aan Zee
20:00	Broekhuizen 29', 44'; Kuisch 75'; Westerveld 83'			Stadium: Sportpark Nieuw Zuid

28 October 2026	VVSB	4–0	EVV	Noordwijkerhout
20:00	Cardol 3'; Timmermans 7'; Owobowale 37'; Wolters 71'			Stadium: Sportpark de Boekhorst

28 October 2026	VVV-Venlo	0–2	Vitesse	Venlo
20:00			Probst 31'; Bannis 45' (pen.)	Stadium: De Koel

28 October 2026	Excelsior Maassluis	0–2	Heerenveen	Maassluis
21:00			Vente 63'; Trenskow 75'	Stadium: Sportpark Dijkpolder

29 October 2026	Kozakken Boys	0–1	Utrecht	Werkendam
18:45			Panagiotou 38'	Stadium: Sportpark de Zwaaier

29 October 2026	ACV	1–2 (a.e.t.)	AFC	Assen
20:00	Van der Werff 109'		Hovenkamp 100'; Gouda 115'	Stadium: Sportpark ICT Specialist

29 October 2026	De Treffers	1–0	Heracles Almelo	Groesbeek
20:00	Van Bakel 61'			Stadium: Sportpark Zuid

29 October 2026	GVVV	3–0	Noordwijk	Veenendaal
20:00	Van Essen 4', 21'; Veenhof 75'			Stadium: Sportpark Panhuis

29 October 2026	Hoek	4–2	Sparta Nijkerk	Hoek
20:00	Bostdorp 4', 39'; Aelterman 45+1' (pen.); Van Daele 75'		Buitink 15'; Vink 21'	Stadium: Sportpark Denoek

29 October 2026	Purmersteijn	2–0 (a.e.t.)	Gemert	Purmerend
20:00	Tol 105'; Polman 109' (pen.)			Stadium: Sportpark Purmersteijn

29 October 2026	RKAV Volendam	3–0	ROHDA Raalte	Volendam
20:00	Tol; Veerman; Ait Abdellah			Stadium: Hein Koning Stadion

29 October 2026	Groningen	0–2	Emmen	Groningen
21:00			Cooper-Love 10', 55'	Stadium: Euroborg

== Second round ==
The draw for the second round took place on 30 October 2026, with matches being played on 1, 2 and 3 December. Due to their participation in European football, Ajax, AZ, Feyenoord, NEC, PSV Eindhoven and Twente only entered this round.

1 December 2026	RKC Waalwijk	v	Cambuur	Waalwijk
18:45				Stadium: Mandemakers Stadion

1 December 2026	Willem II	v	Excelsior	Tilburg
20:00				Stadium: Koning Willem II Stadion

1 December 2026	AFC	v	Purmersteijn	Amsterdam
20:00				Stadium: Sportpark Goed Genoeg

1 December 2026	Almere City	v	VVSB	Almere
20:00				Stadium: Yanmar Stadion

1 December 2026	NAC Breda	v	Genemuiden	Breda
20:00				Stadium: Rat Verlegh Stadion

1 December 2026	Go Ahead Eagles	v	TOP Oss	Deventer
21:00				Stadium: De Adelaarshorst

2 December 2026	Heerenveen	v	De Treffers	Heerenveen
18:45				Stadium: Abe Lenstra Stadion

2 December 2026	Eindhoven	v	Quick Boys	Eindhoven
20:00				Stadium: Jan Louwers Stadion

2 December 2026	Fortuna Sittard	v	Twente	Sittard
21:00				Stadium: Fortuna Sittard Stadion

3 December 2026	Emmen	v	Utrecht	Emmen
18:45				Stadium: De Oude Meerdijk

3 December 2026	Roda JC	v	RKAV Volendam	Kerkrade
20:00				Stadium: Parkstad Limburg Stadion

3 December 2026	Ajax	v	Den Bosch	Amsterdam
21:00				Stadium: Johan Cruyff Arena

16 December 2026	GVVV	v	Feyenoord	Veenendaal
18:45				Stadium: Sportpark Panhuis

16 December 2026	Hoek	v	AZ	Hoek
20:00				Stadium: Sportpark Denoek

16 December 2026	PSV Eindhoven	v	Vitesse	Eindhoven
21:00				Stadium: Philips Stadion

17 December 2026	Excelsior '31	v	NEC	Rijssen
18:45				Stadium: Sportpark De Koerbelt

== Final ==
The final will be held between the two semi-final winners on 18 April 2027.
