= 2025–26 Derde Divisie =

Fourth tier of Dutch football season

Derde Divisie
- Season: 2025–26

The 2025–26 Derde Divisie season is the tenth edition of the Dutch fourth tier.

== Derde Divisie A ==
Derde Divisie A
- Season: 2025–26
- Champions: ROHDA
- Promoted: ROHDA
- Relegated: Huizen; Urk; HSC '21
- Matches: 306
- Goals: 1,016 (3.32 per match)

=== Teams ===
==== Team changes ====
Promoted from 2024–25 Vierde Divisie	Relegated from 2024–25 Tweede Divisie	Promoted to 2025–26 Tweede Divisie	Relegated to 2025–26 Vierde Divisie
Scherpenzeel; Hoogeveen; Staphorst	ADO '20	IJsselmeervogels	Ajax; DEM; HBC

Location of teams in the Derde Divisie A 2025-26
Utrecht clubs in the Derde Divisie A 2025-26

Club	Location
ADO '20	Heemskerk
DOVO	Veenendaal
DVS '33	Ermelo
Eemdijk	Bunschoten
Excelsior '31	Rijssen
Genemuiden	Genemuiden
Harkemase Boys	Harkema
Hoogeveen	Hoogeveen
Hercules	Utrecht
HSC '21	Haaksbergen
Huizen	Huizen
ROHDA	Raalte
Scherpenzeel	Scherpenzeel
Sparta Nijkerk	Nijkerk
Sportlust '46	Woerden
Staphorst	Staphorst
TEC	Tiel
Urk	Urk

==== Number of teams by province ====
Number of teams	Province	Team(s)
5	Overijssel	Excelsior '31, Genemuiden, HSC '21, ROHDA, Staphorst
4	Gelderland	DVS '33, Scherpenzeel, Sparta Nijkerk, TEC
4	Utrecht	DOVO, Eemdijk, Hercules, Sportlust '46
2	North Holland	ADO '20, Huizen
1	Drenthe	Hoogeveen
1	Flevoland	Urk
1	Friesland	Harkemase Boys

=== Standings ===
Pos	Team	Pld	W	D	L	GF	GA	GD	Pts	Promotion, qualification or relegation
1	ROHDA (Note: Winner of the First Period (Rounds 1–12)) (C, P)	34	20	7	7	63	36	+27	67	Promotion to Tweede Divisie
2	DVS '33 (Note: Winner of the Third Period (Rounds 24–34))	34	17	11	6	59	39	+20	62	Qualification for promotion play-offs
3	Sparta Nijkerk (Note: Winner of the Second Period (Rounds 13–23))	34	19	4	11	84	43	+41	61	Qualification for promotion play-offs
4	ADO '20	34	17	9	8	45	35	+10	60	Qualification for promotion play-offs
5	Genemuiden	34	17	5	12	61	52	+9	56	
6	Staphorst	34	17	3	14	63	53	+10	54	
7	Harkemase Boys	34	14	10	10	56	44	+12	52	
8	DOVO	34	15	7	12	53	43	+10	52	
9	Eemdijk	34	14	8	12	67	58	+9	50	
10	Scherpenzeel	34	14	7	13	59	49	+10	49	
11	Hoogeveen	34	14	6	14	54	64	−10	48	
12	Sportlust '46	34	14	5	15	54	52	+2	47	
13	Hercules	34	13	5	16	53	57	−4	44	
14	Excelsior '31	34	12	4	18	49	57	−8	40	
15	Huizen (R)	34	11	7	16	51	63	−12	40	Qualification for relegation play-offs
16	TEC (O)	34	12	4	18	48	64	−16	40	Qualification for relegation play-offs
17	Urk (R)	34	8	7	19	61	97	−36	31	Relegation to Vierde Divisie
18	HSC '21 (R)	34	1	5	28	35	109	−74	8	Relegation to Vierde Divisie

Source: Flashscore
Rules for classification: Season in progress: 1) Most points won; 2) Less points lost; 3) Goal difference; 4) Goals scored; 5) Alphabetical order; End of season: 1) Points; 2) Goal difference; 3) Goals scored; 4) Head-to-head points; 5) Head-to-head goal difference; 6) Head-to-head away goals scored; 7) Play-off if relevant for deciding champion, relegation or participating in a European league, otherwise by draw. 8) Penalty shoot-out (only after a play-off)
(C) Champions; (O) Play-off winners; (P) Promoted; (R) Relegated

=== Fixtures and results ===
Home \ Away	ADO	DOV	DVS	EEM	EXC	GEN	HAR	HER	HOO	HSC	HUI	ROH	SCH	SPA	SPO	STA	TEC	URK
ADO '20		2–0	0–0	1–3	2–0	1–0	2–0	1–0	5–1	2–1	3–1	0–0	1–0	1–1	2–2	2–0	1–0	1–0
DOVO	1–0		2–0	0–2	2–1	2–2	2–1	2–0	1–2	6–0	1–4	0–1	0–0	2–1	2–0	0–1	3–1	3–2
DVS '33	1–1	3–0		3–0	1–2	1–1	1–1	3–2	3–0	3–0	1–0	4–2	0–0	2–2	2–1	3–1	1–0	2–2
Eemdijk	2–2	2–1	2–3		2–2	2–3	1–1	2–0	1–1	5–1	0–2	1–1	3–2	2–4	1–2	2–4	3–1	5–3
Excelsior '31	2–0	1–0	0–1	0–3		1–3	0–1	3–0	3–3	2–0	2–3	1–1	0–1	3–2	1–2	3–1	1–2	0–1
Genemuiden	4–1	2–6	2–2	1–2	2–1		2–1	3–2	2–3	3–2	3–3	0–1	1–0	2–1	3–1	1–4	0–2	3–0
Harkemase Boys	1–2	1–1	2–2	3–2	1–2	0–2		4–2	1–1	0–0	3–3	2–1	3–1	1–1	4–1	2–0	4–2	2–3
Hercules	2–2	1–2	0–2	1–2	3–2	2–0	4–0		3–3	5–2	1–0	2–1	1–1	1–0	1–0	3–2	0–2	3–0
Hoogeveen	0–2	2–1	1–1	1–0	0–1	2–1	0–3	2–2		3–1	3–2	0–1	1–0	0–1	3–2	2–1	2–3	5–2
HSC '21	2–3	0–0	0–2	4–1	0–3	0–2	0–3	1–7	2–4		1–1	0–4	0–4	2–3	0–4	0–1	3–4	1–1
Huizen	1–0	3–2	0–1	1–1	4–2	0–2	0–2	5–0	1–0	2–0		3–2	0–4	0–3	0–3	1–0	2–2	2–5
ROHDA	4–0	0–0	2–1	2–2	4–1	1–1	2–1	2–1	2–1	3–2	3–1		3–0	0–2	2–0	2–2	0–1	3–1
Scherpenzeel	1–1	1–2	0–3	1–1	2–0	4–0	2–1	1–0	2–1	4–4	2–0	1–2		1–4	4–0	3–3	5–0	3–1
Sparta Nijkerk	0–1	1–1	3–0	3–1	4–3	2–0	0–1	5–0	6–1	7–0	2–0	1–2	2–0		4–1	1–2	2–3	6–0
Sportlust '46	1–1	0–1	2–2	4–2	3–0	0–3	1–1	0–2	5–1	1–2	2–1	1–2	4–1	0–2		1–0	4–2	3–0
Staphorst	2–0	1–3	4–1	1–2	1–3	0–4	0–1	2–0	3–1	4–0	3–1	2–1	5–1	3–1	0–2		3–1	2–2
TEC	1–2	2–1	0–1	0–2	1–1	1–0	0–3	0–0	0–3	3–1	1–1	0–1	1–3	3–2	0–1	1–2		3–4
Urk	2–1	3–3	4–3	0–6	1–2	1–3	1–1	0–2	4–0	5–4	3–3	1–5	1–4	4–5	0–0	2–3	2–5	

Source: Flashsore
Legend: Blue = home team win; Yellow = draw; Red = away team win.

== Derde Divisie B ==
Derde Divisie B
- Season: 2025–26
- Champions: Kloetinge
- Promoted: Kloetinge
- Relegated: SteDoCo; Scheveningen; Meerssen; ASWH
- Matches: 306
- Goals: 1,016 (3.32 per match)

=== Teams ===
==== Team changes ====
Promoted from 2024–25 Vierde Divisie	Relegated from 2024–25 Tweede Divisie	Promoted to 2025–26 Tweede Divisie	Relegated to 2025–26 Vierde Divisie
Zwaluwen; UDI '19; Groene Ster; RBC	Noordwijk; Scheveningen	Hoek; Kozakken Boys	OJC 's-Gravenzande; Smitshoek; Quick

Location of teams in the Derde Divisie B 2025-26

Club	Location
ASWH	Hendrik-Ido-Ambacht
Blauw Geel '38	Veghel
Gemert	Gemert
GOES	Goes
Groene Ster	Heerlerheide
Kloetinge	Kloetinge
Lisse	Lisse
Meerssen	Meerssen
Noordwijk	Noordwijk
RBC	Roosendaal
Rijnvogels	Katwijk
Scheveningen	Scheveningen
SteDoCo	Hoornaar
TOGB	Berkel en Rodenrijs
UDI '19	Uden
UNA	Veldhoven
VVSB	Noordwijkerhout
Zwaluwen	Vlaardingen

==== Number of teams by province ====
Number of teams	Province	Team(s)
9	South Holland	ASWH, Lisse, Noordwijk, Rijnvogels, Scheveningen, SteDoCo, TOGB, VVSB, Zwaluwen
5	North Brabant	Blauw Geel '38, Gemert, RBC, UDI '19, UNA
2	Limburg	Groene Ster, Meerssen
2	Zeeland	GOES, Kloetinge

=== Standings ===
Pos	Team	Pld	W	D	L	GF	GA	GD	Pts	Promotion, qualification or relegation
1	Kloetinge (Note: Winner of the First and Third Period (Rounds 1–12 and 24–34)) (C, P)	34	22	7	5	68	43	+25	73	Promotion to Tweede Divisie
2	Lisse (Note: Winner of the Second Period (Rounds 13–23))	34	20	8	6	67	33	+34	68	Qualification for promotion play-offs
3	VVSB	34	21	5	8	70	37	+33	68	Qualification for promotion play-offs
4	Rijnvogels	34	19	7	8	63	39	+24	64	Qualification for promotion play-offs
5	Gemert	34	17	10	7	71	46	+25	61	
6	RBC	34	15	9	10	71	58	+13	54	
7	TOGB	34	15	8	11	64	61	+3	53	
8	Zwaluwen	34	15	6	13	61	48	+13	51	
9	Blauw Geel '38	34	14	6	14	53	51	+2	48	
10	Noordwijk	34	12	8	14	56	51	+5	44	
11	UDI '19	34	11	6	17	57	74	−17	39	
12	UNA	34	10	8	16	51	59	−8	38	
13	GOES	34	10	7	17	43	61	−18	37	
14	Groene Ster	34	10	6	18	45	64	−19	36	
15	SteDoCo (R)	34	10	4	20	35	69	−34	34	Qualification for relegation play-offs
16	Scheveningen (R)	34	9	5	20	49	65	−16	32	Qualification for relegation play-offs
17	Meerssen (R)	34	8	7	19	47	70	−23	31	Relegation to Vierde Divisie
18	ASWH (R)	34	6	7	21	45	87	−42	25	Relegation to Vierde Divisie

Source: Flashsore
Rules for classification: Season in progress: 1) Most points won; 2) Less points lost; 3) Goal difference; 4) Goals scored; 5) Alphabetical order; End of season: 1) Points; 2) Goal difference; 3) Goals scored; 4) Head-to-head points; 5) Head-to-head goal difference; 6) Head-to-head away goals scored; 7) Play-off if relevant for deciding champion, relegation or participating in a European league, otherwise by draw. 8) Penalty shoot-out (only after a play-off)
(C) Champions; (P) Promoted; (R) Relegated

=== Fixtures and results ===
Home \ Away	ASW	BLA	GEM	GOE	GRO	KLO	LIS	MEE	NOO	RBC	RIJ	SCH	STE	TOG	UDI	UNA	VVS	ZWA
ASWH		1–2	1–3	1–4	0–0	1–3	2–2	4–2	2–4	2–3	2–2	1–5	1–0	0–0	2–5	4–1	0–1	1–6
Blauw Geel '38	5–0		1–2	4–0	4–0	1–1	0–3	2–3	2–1	1–1	1–3	3–2	1–0	1–3	0–1	0–2	2–0	2–2
Gemert	3–1	2–3		3–3	1–0	1–1	1–1	4–1	0–0	2–2	0–1	2–0	6–1	3–0	3–1	1–1	0–1	4–1
GOES	0–1	2–0	3–3		3–2	0–3	1–1	3–4	3–1	1–4	1–2	1–0	1–1	1–0	1–1	1–2	1–4	1–3
Groene Ster	3–1	0–1	1–2	1–0		1–2	2–2	0–1	4–2	1–3	3–2	2–1	2–0	0–1	3–1	0–4	1–1	2–0
Kloetinge	2–1	1–1	2–1	2–1	3–1		3–2	3–2	2–2	3–1	2–0	2–1	3–0	2–2	0–2	2–1	2–1	2–1
Lisse	2–0	0–1	1–1	3–0	1–1	2–0		2–0	2–0	3–2	1–4	5–0	0–1	6–2	1–0	1–1	3–0	1–0
Meerssen	2–2	2–4	2–3	0–1	3–3	2–2	0–0		2–1	1–2	1–1	1–5	1–2	0–1	0–1	1–1	0–2	0–1
Noordwijk	0–0	4–0	4–1	2–2	1–3	1–4	1–2	2–1		4–3	4–1	3–1	3–1	1–2	0–0	3–2	1–2	1–0
RBC	7–1	2–1	3–3	3–0	3–0	3–1	2–1	3–1	1–1		1–1	2–1	1–1	1–1	4–3	2–3	1–0	0–0
Rijnvogels	3–2	0–0	4–0	3–0	3–1	0–1	1–2	3–0	1–0	4–0		1–0	4–1	0–1	3–0	0–0	0–3	1–1
Scheveningen	2–2	2–2	0–3	2–0	2–3	0–2	1–3	1–3	0–0	3–1	1–2		0–1	4–2	1–3	3–2	1–2	2–4
SteDoCo	1–4	0–2	0–3	0–1	3–0	1–5	1–2	3–1	0–4	2–1	1–3	1–2		1–0	4–3	1–2	1–1	2–1
TOGB	4–1	2–1	3–3	1–1	5–1	2–3	1–2	1–0	0–1	3–2	2–3	2–3	3–1		3–3	2–1	4–4	4–4
UDI '19	3–2	1–3	0–2	0–4	2–2	2–0	1–4	2–3	2–1	5–3	1–2	1–1	0–0	5–1		1–3	1–6	1–2
UNA	2–0	2–1	1–4	3–0	2–0	2–2	0–2	1–2	2–2	1–1	2–2	0–2	0–2	1–2	2–3		1–2	0–2
VVSB	4–0	3–1	0–1	1–0	1–0	1–2	2–1	2–2	1–0	2–1	3–1	3–0	5–0	1–3	5–1	4–1		1–1
Zwaluwen	1–2	3–0	2–0	0–2	3–2	3–0	1–3	2–3	2–1	1–2	1–2	0–0	3–1	0–1	3–1	4–2	3–1	

Source: Flashsore
Legend: Blue = home team win; Yellow = draw; Red = away team win.

== Play-offs ==
=== Tweede divisie promotion/relegation play-offs ===
8 teams (16th and 17th place in the Tweede Divisie and three teams each from the Derde Divisie A and Derde Divisie B) play for one spot in next season's Tweede Divisie.

==== Bracket ====
Quarterfinals
IJsselmeervogels	3	2	5
Sparta Nijkerk	0	1	1
Lisse	0	0	0
ADO '20	2	1	3
Excelsior Maassluis	1	3	4
VVSB	1	0	1
DVS '33	0	2	2
Rijnvogels	1	2	3

Semifinals
IJsselmeervogels	7	1	8
ADO '20	0	0	0
Excelsior Maassluis (p)	1	2	3 (5)
Rijnvogels	2	1	3 (4)

Final
IJsselmeervogels	1	2	3
Excelsior Maassluis	2	0	2

===== Quarterfinals =====
27 May 2026
20:00

ADO '20	2−0	Lisse
Helder 35', 70'

Sportpark De Vlotter, Heemskerk
30 May 2026
14:30

Lisse	0−1	ADO '20
		Helder 34'

Ter Specke, Lisse

ADO '20 won 3–0 on aggregate.

27 May 2026
20:00

Rijnvogels	1−0	DVS '33
Kaabouni 90+2'	Report

Sportpark de Kooltuin, Katwijk
Referee: Daan Schaper
30 May 2026
15:00

DVS '33	2−2	Rijnvogels
Müller 25'; Van Hilten 33'		Assendelft 66'; Kaabouni 84'

Sportpark Zuid, Ermelo

Rijnvogels won 3–2 on aggregate.

27 May 2026
20:00

Sparta Nijkerk	0−3	IJsselmeervogels
	Report	Dkidak 38'; Ignacio 77'; Ruizendaal 83'

De Ebbenhorst, Nijkerk
Attendance: Andy Wolff
30 May 2026
15:00

IJsselmeervogels	2−1	Sparta Nijkerk
Van Bohenen 33'; Beers 51'		Veenstra 87'

Sportpark De Westmaat, Spakenburg

IJsselmeervogels won 5–1 on aggregate.

27 May 2026
20:00

VVSB	1−1	Excelsior Maassluis
Owobowale 85'	Report	Ringeling 43'

Sportpark De Boekhorst, Noordwijkerhout
Referee: Robin Vereijken
30 May 2026
14:30

Excelsior Maassluis	3−0	VVSB
Van Eerden 1'; Slagveer 45'; Verbont 78'

Sportpark Dijkpolder, Maassluis

Excelsior Maassluis won 4–1 on aggregate.

===== Semifinals =====
3 June 2026
20:00

ADO '20	0−7	IJsselmeervogels
		Beers 7', 39'; Dkidak 50', 67'; Schulte 60'; Ignacio 78'; Butter 82'

Sportpark De Vlotter, Heemskerk
6 June 2026
15:00

IJsselmeervogels	1–0	ADO '20
Dkidak 51'

Sportpark De Westmaat, Spakenburg

IJsselmeervogels won 8–0 on aggregate.

3 June 2026
20:00

Rijnvogels	2−1	Excelsior Maassluis
Van der Meer 45' (pen.), 74'		Wennekers 35'

Sportpark de Kooltuin, Katwijk
6 June 2026
14:30

Excelsior Maassluis	2−1 (a.e.t.)	Rijnvogels
Ringeling 18'; Tavares 42'		Van der Meer 89'
Penalties
Plank (penalty missed); Wennekers (penalty missed); Verbont (penalty scored); Van Eerden (penalty scored); Ringeling (penalty scored); Heuvelman (penalty scored); Van der Kleij (penalty scored)	5−4	(penalty missed) Van der Meer; (penalty missed) Gomez-Nieto; (penalty scored) Charai; (penalty scored) Mercera; (penalty scored) Roffelsen; (penalty scored) Van de Riet; (penalty missed) Scholten

Sportpark Dijkpolder, Maassluis

3–3 on aggregate. Excelsior Maassluis won 5–4 on penalties.

===== Final =====
10 June 2026
20:00

Excelsior Maassluis	2–1	IJsselmeervogels
Madi 27'; Ringeling 90+5'		Dkidak 62'

Sportpark Dijkpolder, Maassluis
Attendance: 2,000
Referee: Luuk Timmer
14 June 2026
15:00

IJsselmeervogels	2–0 (a.e.t.)	Excelsior Maassluis
van Bohemen 32'; Kuisch 103'

Sportpark De Westmaat, Spakenburg
Attendance: 3,000
Referee: Pieter van Veelen

IJsselmeervogels won 3–2 on aggregate.
