= 2022–23 Derde Divisie =

Derde Divisie
- Season: 2022–23

The 2022–23 Derde Divisie season was the seventh edition of the Dutch fourth tier, formerly called Topklasse, since the restructuring of the league system in the summer of 2016.

== Saturday league ==
Derde Divisie Saturday
- Season: 2022–23
- Champions: ACV
- Promoted: ACV
- Relegated: VVOG; Excelsior '31; Ter Leede; ASWH
- Matches played: 306
- Goals scored: 990 (3.24 per match)

=== Teams ===
Location of teams in the Saturday Derde Divisie 2022-23

Club	Location	Stadium	Capacity
ACV	Assen	Univé Sportpark	
ASWH	Hendrik-Ido-Ambacht	Sportpark Schildman	3,000
Barendrecht	Barendrecht	Sportpark De Bongerd	1,500
DOVO	Veenendaal	Sportpark Panhuis	4,500
DVS '33	Ermelo	Sportpark Zuid	
Excelsior '31	Rijssen	Sportpark De Koerbelt	4,150
GVVV	Veenendaal	Sportpark Panhuis	4,500
Harkemase Boys	Harkema	De Bosk	5,000
Hoek	Hoek	Sportpark Denoek	3,500
Rijnvogels	Katwijk	Sportpark de Kooltuin	
RKAV Volendam	Volendam	KWABO Stadium	
Sparta Nijkerk	Nijkerk	De Ebbenhorst	5,350
Sportlust '46	Woerden	Sportpark Cromwijck	2,000
Staphorst	Staphorst	Het Noorderslag	2,500
SteDoCo	Hoornaar	Sportpark SteDoCo	
Ter Leede	Sassenheim	Roodemolen	2,000
Urk	Urk	De Vormt	
VVOG	Harderwijk	De Strokel	2,000

=== Number of teams by province ===
Number of teams	Province	Team(s)
5	South Holland	ASWH, Barendrecht, Rijnvogels, SteDoCo, Ter Leede
3	Gelderland	DVS '33, Sparta Nijkerk, VVOG
3	Utrecht	DOVO, GVVV, Sportlust '46
2	Overijssel	Excelsior '31, Staphorst
1	Drenthe	ACV
1	Flevoland	Urk
1	Friesland	Harkemase Boys
1	North Holland	RKAV Volendam
1	Zeeland	Hoek

=== Standings ===
Pos	Team	Pld	W	D	L	GF	GA	GD	Pts	Promotion, qualification or relegation
1	ACV (Note: Winner of the Second and Third Period (Rounds 13–23 and 24–34)) (C, P)	34	22	9	3	71	33	+38	75	Promotion to Tweede Divisie
2	GVVV (O, P)	34	21	6	7	77	40	+37	69	Qualification for promotion play-offs
3	SteDoCo	34	18	4	12	59	42	+17	58	Qualification for promotion play-offs
4	Rijnvogels	34	17	5	12	64	55	+9	56	
5	Barendrecht	34	18	5	11	71	54	+17	55 (Note: Barendrecht were deducted 4 points for losing on purpose in order to qualify for the promotion play-offs)	
6	Sportlust '46	34	15	8	11	52	50	+2	53	
7	DVS '33	34	15	7	12	54	43	+11	52	
8	Sparta Nijkerk	34	13	11	10	45	45	0	50	
9	Hoek	34	16	2	16	71	72	−1	50	
10	DOVO (Note: Winner of the First Period (Rounds 1–12))	34	15	3	16	51	56	−5	48	Qualification for promotion play-offs
11	Staphorst	34	12	9	13	38	41	−3	45	
12	Urk	34	13	3	18	62	76	−14	42	
13	Harkemase Boys	34	10	8	16	52	56	−4	38	
14	RKAV Volendam	34	9	9	16	52	72	−20	36	
15	VVOG (R)	34	10	5	19	49	71	−22	35	Qualification for relegation play-offs
16	Excelsior '31 (R)	34	8	9	17	47	58	−11	33	Qualification for relegation play-offs
17	Ter Leede (R)	34	8	9	17	50	65	−15	33	Relegation to Vierde Divisie
18	ASWH (R)	34	7	6	21	25	61	−36	27	Relegation to Vierde Divisie

Source: Flashsore
Rules for classification: Season in progress: 1) Most points won; 2) Less points lost; 3) Goal difference; 4) Goals scored; 5) Alphabetical order; End of season: 1) Points; 2) Goal difference; 3) Goals scored; 4) Head-to-head points; 5) Head-to-head goal difference; 6) Head-to-head away goals scored; 7) Play-off if relevant for deciding champion, relegation or participating in a European league, otherwise by draw. 8) Penalty shoot-out (only after a play-off)
(C) Champions; (O) Play-off winners; (P) Promoted; (R) Relegated

=== Fixtures/results ===
Home \ Away	ACV	ASW	BAR	DOV	DVS	EXC	GVV	HAR	HOE	RIJ	RKA	SPA	SPO	STA	SDC	TER	URK	VVO
ACV		4–0	3–2	1–3	2–1	1–1	2–1	2–1	4–1	1–1	3–1	3–0	3–0	1–1	2–1	2–2	1–1	4–0
ASWH	0–3		0–3	0–3	0–0	1–0	0–4	0–2	0–3	1–1	2–2	3–0	0–1	1–2	1–0	1–6	3–0	0–3
Barendrecht	2–2	1–1		6–1	0–2	3–2	3–4	1–2	5–4	1–1	2–1	1–0	0–2	0–2	2–4	0–0	5–1	3–0
DOVO	1–2	2–0	3–1		1–2	2–1	0–2	3–1	1–0	0–2	3–0	0–1	1–4	4–0	2–1	0–2	4–0	5–1
DVS '33	2–0	2–0	4–0	2–0		1–1	0–2	2–0	4–0	0–1	3–2	0–2	1–1	1–0	0–0	4–1	2–4	2–0
Excelsior '31	0–2	1–2	2–3	0–1	4–0		2–1	4–2	3–5	2–1	1–1	1–2	0–3	1–1	1–3	5–3	1–4	2–1
GVVV	1–2	0–0	2–5	3–1	3–2	3–1		3–2	0–0	1–2	4–0	0–0	6–0	1–2	0–0	5–3	2–1	3–1
Harkemase Boys	1–2	1–3	1–2	4–0	0–0	2–0	0–0		1–3	3–2	1–1	2–2	1–2	0–0	4–2	2–2	3–1	1–2
Hoek	1–4	3–0	1–5	6–0	3–1	1–1	4–7	2–1		2–3	3–2	2–1	4–0	1–2	0–2	1–2	2–3	2–1
Rijnvogels	0–1	5–1	0–1	2–1	2–4	0–4	2–3	4–3	1–0		5–0	0–1	0–3	3–0	0–2	1–0	3–1	3–3
RKAV Volendam	1–1	3–2	1–4	1–3	1–3	2–1	1–0	2–1	0–1	1–2		2–2	2–1	2–0	3–4	2–2	4–1	3–1
Sparta Nijkerk	2–3	1–0	2–1	1–1	2–1	1–1	0–0	2–2	2–0	1–3	3–1		2–0	2–1	1–1	1–2	2–0	1–2
Sportlust '46	1–1	0–0	2–0	2–1	2–0	0–0	1–4	2–2	5–1	2–2	3–0	4–2		0–0	0–3	1–1	1–2	0–3
Staphorst	1–0	1–0	2–3	0–0	1–4	0–0	0–1	3–0	2–3	2–0	2–2	1–1	1–2		1–0	3–1	1–2	0–0
SteDoCo	0–2	1–0	0–0	2–0	2–0	0–1	0–1	2–0	1–3	4–1	2–1	0–2	3–2	0–2		3–0	3–1	2–1
Ter Leede	2–2	1–0	1–2	0–0	2–2	2–0	0–2	0–1	1–2	3–4	2–3	1–1	1–2	2–1	0–4		3–0	0–2
Urk	0–1	0–2	1–2	2–3	1–1	2–1	2–3	0–3	4–3	2–4	3–3	5–1	3–0	1–3	6–4	3–0		3–1
VVOG	1–4	2–1	0–2	4–1	3–1	2–2	1–5	0–2	3–4	1–3	1–1	1–1	0–3	2–0	2–3	3–2	1–2	

Source: Flashsore
Legend: Blue = home team win; Yellow = draw; Red = away team win.

== Sunday league ==
Derde Divisie Sunday
- Season: 2022–23
- Champions: ADO '20
- Promoted: ADO '20
- Relegated: JOS Watergraafsmeer; Dongen; UDI '19
- Matches played: 306
- Goals scored: 974 (3.18 per match)

=== Teams ===
Location of teams in the Sunday Derde Divisie 2022-23

Club	Location	Stadium	Capacity
ADO '20	Heemskerk	Sportpark de Vlotter	6,000
Baronie	Breda	De Blauwe Kei	7,000
Blauw Geel '38	Veghel	Prins Willem Alexander Sportpark	2,500
DEM	Beverwijk	Sportpark Adrichem	
Dongen	Dongen	De Biezen	
Gemert	Gemert		
Groene Ster	Heerlerheide	Pronsebroek	2,500
Hercules	Utrecht	Sportpark Voordorp	1,000
HSC '21	Haaksbergen	Groot Scholtenhagen	4,500
HV & CV Quick	Den Haag	Sportpark Nieuw Hanenburg	
JOS Watergraafsmeer	Amsterdam	Sportpark Drieburg	1,000
OJC	Rosmalen	Sportpark De Groote Wielen	1,000
OSS '20	Oss	Sportpark De Rusheuvel	
TOGB	Berkel en Rodenrijs	Sportpark Het Hoge Land	1,800
UDI '19	Uden	Sportpark Parkzicht	
UNA	Veldhoven	Sportpark Zeelst	2,000
Unitas	Gorinchem	Sportpark Molenvliet	3,000
VVSB	Noordwijkerhout	Sportpark De Boekhorst	2,000

=== Number of teams by province ===
Number of teams	Province	Team(s)
8	North Brabant	Baronie, Blauw Geel '38, Dongen, Gemert, OJC, OSS '20, UDI '19, UNA
4	South Holland	Quick (H), TOGB, Unitas, VVSB
3	North Holland	ADO '20, DEM, JOS Watergraafsmeer
1	Limburg	Groene Ster
1	Overijssel	HSC '21
1	Utrecht	USV Hercules

=== Standings ===
Pos	Team	Pld	W	D	L	GF	GA	GD	Pts	Promotion, qualification or relegation
1	ADO '20 (Note: Winner of the First and Third Period (Rounds 1–12 and 24–34)) (C, P)	34	27	3	4	85	34	+51	84	Promotion to Tweede Divisie
2	VVSB (Note: Winner of the Second Period (Rounds 13–23))	34	22	5	7	87	52	+35	71	Qualification for promotion play-offs
3	Hercules	34	18	9	7	61	33	+28	63	Qualification for promotion play-offs
4	Blauw Geel '38	34	15	10	9	53	45	+8	55	
5	OJC	34	16	6	12	58	56	+2	54	
6	HSC '21	34	14	9	11	64	42	+22	51	
7	UNA	34	12	13	9	55	41	+14	49	
8	TOGB	34	13	10	11	68	56	+12	49	
9	Quick (H)	34	13	10	11	59	47	+12	49	
10	DEM	34	13	9	12	58	53	+5	48	
11	Gemert	34	14	5	15	52	59	−7	47	
12	Unitas	34	13	6	15	43	59	−16	45	
13	Groene Ster	34	10	13	11	42	44	−2	43	Qualification for promotion play-offs
14	OSS '20	34	8	12	14	39	59	−20	36	
15	JOS Watergraafsmeer (R)	34	8	8	18	35	80	−45	32	Qualification for relegation play-offs
16	Baronie (O)	34	8	4	22	44	70	−26	28	Qualification for relegation play-offs
17	Dongen (R)	34	6	7	21	45	77	−32	25	Relegation to Vierde Divisie
18	UDI '19 (R)	34	4	5	25	26	67	−41	17	Relegation to Vierde Divisie

Source: Flashscore
Rules for classification: Season in progress: 1) Most points won; 2) Less points lost; 3) Goal difference; 4) Goals scored; 5) Alphabetical order; End of season: 1) Points; 2) Goal difference; 3) Goals scored; 4) Head-to-head points; 5) Head-to-head goal difference; 6) Head-to-head away goals scored; 7) Play-off if relevant for deciding champion, relegation or participating in a European league, otherwise by draw. 8) Penalty shoot-out (only after a play-off)
(C) Champions; (O) Play-off winners; (P) Promoted; (R) Relegated

=== Fixtures/results ===
Home \ Away	ADO	BAR	BLA	DEM	DON	GEM	GRO	HER	HSC	JOS	OJC	OSS	QHA	TOG	UDI	UNA	UNI	VVS
ADO '20		2–1	4–1	2–1	2–1	0–0	0–2	3–1	4–0	5–0	3–0	2–0	2–0	4–2	3–1	3–1	3–0	3–3
Baronie	1–2		1–5	4–1	1–1	3–0	0–1	1–2	0–3	2–0	1–3	1–2	0–4	1–1	2–3	0–0	4–1	1–3
Blauw Geel '38	1–3	2–1		1–1	2–0	4–1	1–1	2–2	0–2	5–0	2–0	1–0	1–1	2–2	1–0	0–4	1–2	3–2
DEM	0–4	3–1	5–0		2–2	3–0	2–0	0–3	0–1	1–1	5–1	3–1	3–1	0–0	1–0	1–1	2–3	2–4
Dongen	3–2	1–2	1–1	0–2		2–1	1–2	2–2	0–2	2–3	0–1	2–3	2–3	2–6	2–2	1–2	4–2	3–4
Gemert	1–6	2–0	1–1	3–2	1–0		2–1	1–1	0–0	1–2	3–1	1–3	2–1	1–2	0–0	1–3	2–3	3–1
Groene Ster	0–2	3–1	1–4	4–2	0–0	1–4		1–0	1–1	2–1	1–2	1–1	2–3	1–3	3–0	1–1	1–0	2–3
Hercules	1–0	4–0	2–0	1–2	4–1	4–1	1–1		3–1	0–2	2–1	1–0	0–0	3–1	2–0	1–0	1–1	2–2
HSC '21	1–4	1–2	0–1	5–0	4–1	1–2	1–1	2–2		6–0	5–0	1–1	5–0	2–2	3–0	0–3	5–2	2–0
JOS Watergraafsmeer	0–1	1–7	0–0	1–1	0–3	3–5	0–0	0–4	1–0		0–1	1–1	0–4	1–2	3–1	1–1	2–1	0–2
OJC	2–2	3–0	0–0	1–0	5–0	1–0	2–2	1–2	3–2	1–0		4–2	2–1	2–3	4–0	1–5	1–3	1–2
OSS '20	0–2	1–0	0–0	0–4	3–0	1–2	1–1	0–4	1–0	2–3	1–1		2–2	2–2	1–2	1–1	2–0	0–6
Quick (H)	1–2	5–3	0–1	0–0	3–1	0–3	3–0	0–2	1–1	1–1	2–2	3–0		4–1	3–1	1–1	0–1	1–1
TOGB	6–0	4–1	0–1	1–2	1–0	3–1	1–1	2–1	1–1	6–1	0–2	2–2	1–1		5–1	1–5	0–1	2–0
UDI '19	1–2	1–0	1–2	3–1	1–2	0–1	0–0	1–2	1–2	0–1	1–2	2–3	0–2	2–2		0–2	0–0	1–3
UNA	1–3	1–2	3–2	2–2	1–1	1–0	0–4	0–0	1–1	2–2	1–1	1–1	1–2	3–2	3–0		2–0	1–2
Unitas	1–3	0–0	1–3	1–1	1–3	0–4	1–0	2–1	0–1	5–2	3–1	0–0	1–5	2–1	1–0	1–0		1–1
VVSB	0–2	4–0	3–2	1–3	6–1	5–2	0–0	2–0	4–2	5–2	2–5	3–1	2–1	3–0	3–0	2–1	3–2	

Source: Flashscore
Legend: Blue = home team win; Yellow = draw; Red = away team win.

== Play-offs ==
=== Tweede divisie promotion/relegation play-offs ===
All times Central European Summer Time (UTC+2)

==== Bracket ====
Quarterfinals
GVVV	2	4	6
Groene Ster	0	0	0
IJsselmeervogels	0	0	0
Hercules	6	5	11
VVSB	0	5	5
DOVO	1	2	3
TEC	1	0	1
SteDoCo	4	2	6

Semifinals
GVVV	0	3	3
Hercules	1	0	1
VVSB	0	2	2
SteDoCo	1	2	3

Final
GVVV	2	2	4
SteDoCo	1	0	1

==== Quarterfinals ====
7 June 2023
20:00

SteDoCo	4–1	TEC

Sportpark SteDoCo, Hoornaar
10 June 2023
18:00

TEC	0–2	SteDoCo

Sportpark De Lok, Tiel

SteDoCo won 6–1 on aggregate.

31 May 2023
20:00

DOVO	1–0	VVSB
Pluk 4'	Report

Sportpark Panhuis, Veenendaal
3 June 2023
18:00

VVSB	5–2	DOVO

Sportpark De Boekhorst, Noordwijkerhout

VVSB won 5–3 on aggregate.

31 May 2023
20:00

Hercules	6–0	IJsselmeervogels
van de Groep 26' (o.g.); Waterink 32' van Rooijen 47'; Pieters 75', 83'; Vermeulen 89'	Report

Sportpark Voordorp, Utrecht
3 June 2023
18:00

IJsselmeervogels	0–5	Hercules
		Waterink 8', 41'; Lahri 52'; Pieters 61'; Vermeulen 71'

Sportpark De Westmaat, Spakenburg

Hercules won 11–0 on aggregate.

31 May 2023
20:00

Groene Ster	0–2	GVVV
	Report	Veenhof 50'; Burgering 62' (pen.)

Pronsebroek, Heerlerheide
3 June 2023
18:00

GVVV	4–0	Groene Ster

Sportpark Panhuis, Veenendaal

GVVV won 6–0 on aggregate.

==== Semifinals ====
14 June 2023

SteDoCo	1–0	VVSB

Sportpark SteDoCo, Hoornaar
17 June 2023
15:30

VVSB	2–2	SteDoCo

Sportpark De Boekhorst, Noordwijkerhout

SteDoCo won 3–2 on aggregate.

10 June 2023
18:00

Hercules	1–0	GVVV

Sportpark Voordorp, Utrecht
17 June 2023
18:00

GVVV	3–0	Hercules

Sportpark Panhuis, Veenendaal

GVVV won 3–1 on aggregate.

==== Final ====
21 June 2023
20:00

SteDoCo	1–2	GVVV

Sportpark SteDoCo, Hoornaar
24 June 2023
18:00

GVVV	2–0	SteDoCo

Sportpark Panhuis, Veenendaal

=== Derde divisie promotion/relegation play-offs ===
All times Central European Summer Time (UTC+2)

==== Saturday league ====
===== Bracket =====
Semifinals
VVOG	0	2	2
Smitshoek	1	4	5
Swift	2	0	2
ODIN '59	3	4	7

Final
Smitshoek	1	2	3
ODIN '59	3	3	6

===== Semifinals =====
30 May 2023
19:00

Smitshoek	1–0	VVOG

Sportpark Smitshoek, Barendrecht
3 June 2023
14:30

VVOG	2–4	Smitshoek

De Strokel, Harderwijk

Smitshoek won 5–2 on aggregate.

30 May 2023
20:00

ODIN '59	3–2	Swift

Sportpark Assumburg, Heemskerk
3 June 2023
14:30

Swift	0–4	ODIN '59

Olympiaplein, Amsterdam

ODIN '59 won 7–2 on aggregate.

===== Final =====
6 June 2023
20:00

ODIN '59	3–1	Smitshoek

Sportpark Assumburg, Heemskerk
10 June 2023
14:30

Smitshoek	2–3	ODIN '59

Sportpark Smitshoek, Barendrecht

ODIN '59 won 6–3 on aggregate.

===== Bracket =====
Semifinals
Capelle	2	4	6
AZSV	2	1	3
Excelsior '31	0	1	1
Genemuiden	2	1	3

Final
Capelle	1	2	3
Genemuiden	3	3	6

===== Semifinals =====
30 May 2023
19:30

AZSV	2–2	Capelle

Sportpark Villekamp, Aalten
3 June 2023
14:30

Capelle	4–1	AZSV

Sportpark 't Slot, Capelle aan den IJssel

Capelle won 6–3 on aggregate.

30 May 2023
20:00

Genemuiden	2–0	Excelsior '31
Streutker 29'; Popovic 31'	Report

Sportpark de Wetering, Genemuiden
3 June 2023
14:30

Excelsior '31	1–1	Genemuiden

Sportpark De Koerbelt, Rijssen

Genemuiden won 3–1 on aggregate.

===== Final =====
6 June 2023
20:00

Genemuiden	3–1	Capelle

Sportpark de Wetering, Genemuiden
10 June 2023
14:30

Capelle	2–3	Genemuiden

Sportpark 't Slot, Capelle aan den IJssel

Genemuiden won 6–3 on aggregate.

==== Sunday league ====
===== Bracket =====
Semifinals
Kampong	0	4	4
Be Quick	0	1	1
JOS Watergraafsmeer	2	4	6
HBS	2	0	2

Final
Kampong (a.e.t.)	0	3	3
JOS Watergraafsmeer	1	0	0

===== Semifinals =====
1 June 2023
20:00

HBS	2–2	JOS Watergraafsmeer

Sportpark Daal en Bergselaan, The Hague
4 June 2023
14:00

JOS Watergraafsmeer	4–0	HBS

Sportpark Drieburg, Amsterdam

JOS Watergraafsmeer won 6–2 on aggregate.

1 June 2023
20:00

Be Quick	0–0	Kampong

Stadion Esserberg, Haren
4 June 2023
14:30

Kampong	4–1	Be Quick

De Klapperboom, Utrecht

Kampong won 4–1 on aggregate.

===== Final =====
8 June 2023
20:00

JOS Watergraafsmeer	1–0	Kampong

Sportpark Drieburg, Amsterdam
11 June 2023
18:00

Kampong	3–0 (a.e.t.)	JOS Watergraafsmeer

De Klapperboom, Utrecht

Kampong won 3–1 on aggregate.

===== Bracket =====
Semifinals
Baronie	0	2	2
Juliana '31	1	0	1
RKAVV	0	1	1
AWC	0	2	2

Final
Baronie	1	0	1
AWC	1	1	2

===== Semifinals =====
1 June 2023
20:00

Juliana '31	1–0	Baronie

De Broeklanden, Malden
4 June 2023
14:00

Baronie	2–0	Juliana '31

De Blauwe Kei, Breda

Baronie won 2–1 on aggregate.

1 June 2023
20:00

AWC	0–0	RKAVV

Sportpark De Wijchert, Wijchen
4 June 2023
14:00

RKAVV	1–2	AWC

Kastelenring, Leidschendam

AWC won 2–1 on aggregate.

===== Final =====
8 June 2023
20:00

AWC	1–1	Baronie

Sportpark De Wijchert, Wijchen
11 June 2023
14:00

Baronie	0–1	AWC

De Blauwe Kei, Breda

AWC won 2–1 on aggregate.

===== Relegation play-off =====
Because Tweede Divisie team OFC, which placed last, withdrew its team, sunday league teams JOS Watergraafsmeer and Baronie played extra play-off matches. The best team over two legs remained in the Derde Divisie, whilst the loser relegated to the Vierde Divisie

15 June 2023
20:00

Baronie	3–1	JOS Watergraafsmeer

De Blauwe Kei, Breda
18 June 2023
14:00

JOS Watergraafsmeer	4–3	Baronie

Sportpark Drieburg, Amsterdam

Baronie won 6–5 on aggregate.
