= 2023–24 Derde Divisie =

Fourth tier of Dutch football season

Derde Divisie
- Season: 2023–24

The 2023–24 Derde Divisie season was the eighth edition of the Dutch fourth tier, formerly called Topklasse, since the restructuring of the league system in the summer of 2016.

== Derde Divisie A ==
Derde Divisie A
- Season: 2023–24
- Champions: RKAV Volendam
- Promoted: RKAV Volendam
- Relegated: Staphorst; Hoogeveen; Kampong; ODIN '59
- Matches played: 306
- Goals scored: 1,079 (3.53 per match)

=== Teams ===
==== Team changes ====
Promoted from 2022–23 Vierde Divisie	Relegated from 2022–23 Tweede Divisie	Promoted to 2023–24 Tweede Divisie	Relegated to 2023–24 Vierde Divisie
Eemdijk; Genemuiden; Hoogeveen; Kampong; ODIN '59	IJsselmeervogels	ACV; GVVV	ASWH; Excelsior '31; Ter Leede; VVOG

Location of teams in the Derde Divisie A 2023-24
Utrecht clubs in the Derde Divisie A 2023-24

Club	Location
DEM	Beverwijk
DOVO	Veenendaal
DVS '33	Ermelo
Eemdijk	Bunschoten
Genemuiden	Genemuiden
Harkemase Boys	Harkema
Hercules	Utrecht
Hoogeveen	Hoogeveen
HSC '21	Haaksbergen
IJsselmeervogels	Spakenburg
Kampong	Utrecht
ODIN '59	Heemskerk
Rijnvogels	Katwijk
Sparta Nijkerk	Nijkerk
Staphorst	Staphorst
Urk	Urk
RKAV Volendam	Volendam
VVSB	Noordwijkerhout

==== Number of teams by province ====
Number of teams	Province	Team(s)
5	Utrecht	DOVO, Eemdijk, Hercules, IJsselmeervogels, Kampong
3	North Holland	DEM, ODIN '59, RKAV Volendam
3	Overijssel	Genemuiden, HSC '21, Staphorst
2	Gelderland	DVS '33, Sparta Nijkerk
2	South Holland	Rijnvogels, VVSB
1	Drenthe	Hoogeveen
1	Flevoland	Urk
1	Friesland	Harkemase Boys

=== Standings ===
Pos	Team	Pld	W	D	L	GF	GA	GD	Pts	Promotion, qualification or relegation
1	RKAV Volendam (C, P)	34	21	3	10	92	53	+39	66	Promotion to Tweede Divisie
2	IJsselmeervogels	34	19	6	9	72	43	+29	63	
3	Genemuiden (Note: Winner of the Second Period (Rounds 13–23))	34	16	11	7	68	40	+28	59	Qualification for promotion play-offs
4	Hercules (Note: Winner of the Third Period (Rounds 24–34))	34	17	6	11	63	43	+20	57	Qualification for promotion play-offs
5	Sparta Nijkerk	34	18	2	14	81	66	+15	56	
6	Harkemase Boys (Note: Winner of the First Period (Rounds 1–12))	34	14	12	8	62	47	+15	54	Qualification for promotion play-offs
7	DOVO	34	14	10	10	62	45	+17	52	
8	HSC '21	34	14	10	10	60	53	+7	52	
9	DVS '33	34	14	6	14	61	42	+19	48	
10	Rijnvogels	34	14	6	14	60	62	−2	48	
11	Eemdijk	34	13	9	12	57	62	−5	48	
12	VVSB	34	14	5	15	62	67	−5	47	
13	DEM	34	14	5	15	49	54	−5	47	
14	Urk	34	12	9	13	56	73	−17	45	
15	Staphorst (R)	34	13	5	16	56	64	−8	44	Qualification for relegation play-offs
16	Hoogeveen (R)	34	10	3	21	45	87	−42	33	Qualification for relegation play-offs
17	Kampong (R)	34	6	7	21	44	70	−26	25	Relegation to Vierde Divisie
18	ODIN '59 (R)	34	3	5	26	29	108	−79	14	Relegation to Vierde Divisie

Updated to match(es) played on 25 May 2024. Source: Flashsore
Rules for classification: Season in progress: 1) Most points won; 2) Less points lost; 3) Goal difference; 4) Goals scored; 5) Alphabetical order; End of season: 1) Points; 2) Goal difference; 3) Goals scored; 4) Head-to-head points; 5) Head-to-head goal difference; 6) Head-to-head away goals scored; 7) Play-off if relevant for deciding champion, relegation or participating in a European league, otherwise by draw. 8) Penalty shoot-out (only after a play-off)
(C) Champions; (P) Promoted; (R) Relegated

=== Fixtures and results ===
Home \ Away	DEM	DOV	DVS	EEM	GEN	HAR	HER	HOO	HSC	IJS	KAM	ODI	RIJ	SPA	STA	URK	VOL	VVS
DEM		2–2	0–2	1–3	2–1	2–0	2–3	2–3	2–2	2–0	0–0	2–0	4–2	2–0	1–2	1–1	1–4	0–2
DOVO	3–0		2–0	5–2	2–2	1–1	2–2	3–1	0–1	2–3	3–2	2–0	4–2	4–2	3–0	3–0	2–1	1–1
DVS '33	2–0	2–2		5–0	0–3	1–3	0–2	3–0	4–0	1–2	3–2	7–1	5–1	2–3	1–1	0–1	0–3	1–1
Eemdijk	0–3	1–1	0–1		1–4	1–0	1–0	3–4	4–1	2–0	2–1	3–1	3–4	4–3	2–1	1–1	3–1	0–2
Genemuiden	1–2	4–1	1–1	4–0		1–1	2–1	1–0	2–2	0–0	3–1	4–2	1–1	2–1	5–1	0–0	3–1	3–3
Harkemase Boys	0–1	3–1	0–0	2–2	0–3		3–2	4–0	1–1	0–0	1–1	4–2	1–1	1–0	3–0	4–4	2–1	3–0
Hercules	2–0	1–0	2–0	3–3	2–1	1–2		5–0	3–0	0–0	2–2	1–1	2–1	0–2	3–2	5–1	4–0	0–1
Hoogeveen	1–2	0–2	3–2	1–0	1–2	2–2	0–2		4–1	0–3	0–3	3–2	0–5	2–1	1–3	1–1	1–3	2–4
HSC '21	1–2	3–3	1–4	1–1	1–1	0–1	2–1	2–2		2–1	3–1	1–0	3–0	1–2	2–0	5–2	2–0	1–1
IJsselmeervogels	2–0	3–1	1–0	2–2	2–2	3–1	4–0	7–1	0–4		2–0	2–1	1–2	3–2	4–1	1–1	0–3	4–1
Kampong	1–2	1–1	2–1	0–0	2–1	0–1	0–1	0–1	0–2	1–4		2–2	4–0	0–1	1–2	1–2	1–3	1–3
ODIN '59	1–4	1–1	0–3	0–4	0–2	2–2	1–0	1–3	1–3	1–4	1–3		2–1	0–7	1–4	1–1	0–5	1–0
Rijnvogels	1–1	0–3	1–0	1–1	0–3	3–3	1–3	0–1	0–1	3–0	5–2	3–0		3–1	2–1	4–1	1–1	1–0
Sparta Nijkerk	4–1	1–0	1–5	2–2	3–2	4–2	2–5	1–1	1–1	2–0	4–1	5–1	2–1		3–2	1–2	4–1	4–0
Staphorst	0–2	0–2	1–0	3–0	0–0	2–0	1–1	5–1	0–5	1–0	1–1	3–0	1–2	5–1		1–4	3–6	1–0
Urk	1–0	1–0	1–3	1–3	1–0	0–6	1–2	4–1	2–2	1–6	1–3	4–0	2–4	4–3	1–3		4–2	2–2
RKAV Volendam	4–2	1–0	1–1	1–0	3–0	1–3	3–1	3–2	4–2	1–2	6–0	11–2	3–1	3–1	3–3	3–0		3–1
VVSB	3–1	1–0	0–1	2–3	2–3	3–2	2–1	3–1	3–1	2–6	6–4	4–0	2–3	2–5	3–2	1–3	1–3	

Updated to match(es) played on 25 May 2024. Source: Flashsore
Legend: Blue = home team win; Yellow = draw; Red = away team win.

== Derde Divisie B ==
Derde Divisie B
- Season: 2023–24
- Champions: Barendrecht
- Promoted: Barendrecht
- Relegated: AWC; Unitas; Groene Ster; Baronie
- Matches played: 306
- Goals scored: 981 (3.21 per match)

=== Teams ===
==== Team changes ====
Promoted from 2022–23 Vierde Divisie	Relegated from 2022–23 Tweede Divisie	Promoted to 2023–24 Tweede Divisie	Relegated to 2023–24 Vierde Divisie
AWC; Kloetinge; Meerssen	TEC	ADO '20	Dongen; JOS Watergraafsmeer; UDI '19

Location of teams in the Derde Divisie B 2023-24

Club	Location
AWC	Wijchen
Barendrecht	Barendrecht
Baronie	Breda
Blauw Geel '38	Veghel
Gemert	Gemert
Groene Ster	Heerlerheide
Hoek	Hoek
Kloetinge	Kloetinge
Meerssen	Meerssen
OJC	Rosmalen
OSS '20	Oss
Quick	Den Haag
Sportlust '46	Woerden
SteDoCo	Hoornaar
TEC	Tiel
TOGB	Berkel en Rodenrijs
UNA	Veldhoven
Unitas	Gorinchem

==== Number of teams by province ====
Number of teams	Province	Team(s)
6	North Brabant	Baronie, Blauw Geel '38, Gemert, OJC, OSS '20, UNA
5	South Holland	Barendrecht, Quick, SteDoCo, TOGB, Unitas
2	Gelderland	AWC, TEC
2	Limburg	Groene Ster, Meerssen
2	Zeeland	Hoek, Kloetinge
1	Utrecht	Sportlust '46

=== Standings ===
Pos	Team	Pld	W	D	L	GF	GA	GD	Pts	Promotion, qualification or relegation
1	Barendrecht (Note: Winner of the Second Period (Rounds 13–23)) (C, P)	34	22	5	7	76	37	+39	71	Promotion to Tweede Divisie
2	SteDoCo (Note: Winner of the First Period (Rounds 1–12))	34	20	9	5	70	32	+38	69	Qualification for promotion play-offs
3	Blauw Geel '38 (Note: Winner of the Third Period (Rounds 24–34))	34	20	7	7	67	35	+32	67	Qualification for promotion play-offs
4	TEC	34	17	10	7	67	33	+34	61	Qualification for promotion play-offs
5	Sportlust '46	34	18	7	9	56	36	+20	61	
6	Gemert	34	17	7	10	64	62	+2	58	
7	Meerssen	34	16	8	10	71	52	+19	56	
8	TOGB	34	16	2	16	47	43	+4	50	
9	Hoek	34	13	8	13	73	53	+20	47	
10	UNA	34	13	8	13	50	46	+4	47	
11	Quick	34	15	2	17	62	64	−2	47	
12	Kloetinge	34	13	8	13	45	48	−3	47	
13	OJC	34	8	12	14	55	70	−15	36	
14	OSS '20	34	10	6	18	47	70	−23	36	Withdrawn
15	AWC (R)	34	8	7	19	28	66	−38	30 (Note: AWC were deducted 1 point for the disturbances after the match against UNA)	Qualification for relegation play-offs
16	Unitas (R)	34	8	5	21	40	64	−24	29	Qualification for relegation play-offs
17	Groene Ster (R)	34	7	5	22	29	79	−50	26	Relegation to Vierde Divisie
18	Baronie (R)	34	6	2	26	34	91	−57	20	Relegation to Vierde Divisie

Source: Flashsore
Rules for classification: Season in progress: 1) Most points won; 2) Less points lost; 3) Goal difference; 4) Goals scored; 5) Alphabetical order; End of season: 1) Points; 2) Goal difference; 3) Goals scored; 4) Head-to-head points; 5) Head-to-head goal difference; 6) Head-to-head away goals scored; 7) Play-off if relevant for deciding champion, relegation or participating in a European league, otherwise by draw. 8) Penalty shoot-out (only after a play-off)
(C) Champions; (P) Promoted; (R) Relegated

=== Fixtures and results ===
Home \ Away	AWC	BAR	BAO	BLA	GEM	GRO	HOE	KLO	MEE	OJC	OSS	QUI	SPO	SDC	TEC	TOG	UNA	UNI
AWC		1–0	3–0	0–1	1–2	1–0	0–4	2–0	1–4	2–2	0–2	0–0	0–4	0–3	0–4	0–1	2–1	2–0
Barendrecht	6–0		4–2	0–0	0–2	3–1	3–4	5–0	5–2	3–0	0–1	2–1	1–0	0–0	3–1	2–1	3–1	2–0
Baronie	1–0	2–4		0–1	3–4	0–1	2–1	1–3	1–3	0–2	0–1	0–4	0–6	0–2	0–4	2–3	0–3	2–0
Blauw Geel '38	3–3	2–2	4–0		2–3	1–0	2–0	0–2	2–1	2–1	3–1	2–0	1–2	1–4	3–0	3–1	3–1	4–2
Gemert	0–0	4–1	7–0	2–1		3–1	0–4	3–1	3–3	1–1	5–1	1–4	2–1	1–3	0–4	2–1	2–1	0–2
Groene Ster	1–3	2–2	1–0	0–3	3–4		2–2	0–1	0–2	1–5	3–1	2–1	0–0	0–2	0–10	1–2	3–1	1–2
Hoek	4–0	1–3	3–1	1–2	3–0	4–1		1–1	4–1	1–2	2–0	1–2	1–2	1–1	0–2	2–2	2–2	2–3
Kloetinge	3–0	0–2	2–0	2–4	1–1	1–1	2–1		1–0	1–1	1–1	3–1	3–0	1–1	3–0	2–1	0–2	2–1
Meerssen	2–0	3–1	3–2	0–0	4–2	5–1	1–1	1–0		4–2	3–1	5–1	1–3	2–2	2–3	4–0	1–1	3–0
OJC	0–0	0–2	4–4	1–4	1–2	4–1	1–5	2–2	2–2		2–2	1–4	0–0	1–4	2–0	1–2	2–2	1–1
OSS '20	1–0	0–3	3–4	1–5	2–2	0–1	2–1	1–0	3–3	1–5		5–2	0–1	0–2	1–1	4–1	1–5	2–1
Quick	1–2	0–4	2–3	0–3	5–0	6–0	1–6	3–1	4–1	4–1	3–2		3–0	1–0	2–1	1–0	0–1	3–2
Sportlust '46	2–0	0–1	2–0	2–1	4–1	0–1	1–1	3–1	0–2	4–2	3–1	5–1		2–2	1–1	2–0	1–0	1–0
SteDoCo	3–3	0–2	4–0	1–1	1–3	5–0	3–2	2–0	0–1	4–1	1–0	2–1	1–1		1–0	1–0	1–1	5–0
TEC	3–0	3–3	0–0	0–0	0–2	0–0	3–3	1–1	1–0	1–1	2–0	3–0	5–0	3–2		1–0	3–0	2–1
TOGB	3–0	1–2	2–0	0–0	3–0	2–0	3–0	2–1	1–0	0–1	2–1	3–0	1–0	1–3	0–2		3–0	3–0
UNA	1–1	0–1	3–1	2–1	0–0	1–0	1–2	4–1	3–1	0–1	2–2	1–0	1–2	0–1	1–1	4–2		3–2
Unitas	4–1	2–1	2–3	0–2	0–0	2–0	1–3	0–2	1–1	4–2	1–3	1–1	1–1	2–3	1–2	1–0	0–1	

Source: Flashsore
Legend: Blue = home team win; Yellow = draw; Red = away team win.

== Play-offs ==
=== Tweede divisie promotion/relegation play-offs ===
8 teams (16th and 17th place in the Tweede Divisie and three teams each from the Derde Divisie A and Derde Divisie B) play for one spot in next season's Tweede Divisie.

==== Bracket ====
Quarterfinals
Genemuiden	0	5	5
TEC	1	1	2
Kozakken Boys	1	2	3(4)
Blauw Geel '38 (p)	2	1	3(5)
Excelsior Maassluis	1	3	4
Hercules	1	0	1
SteDoCo	1	1	2(5)
Harkemase Boys (p)	1	1	2(6)

Semifinals
Genemuiden (p)	3	4	7(4)
Blauw Geel '38	4	3	7(3)
Excelsior Maassluis	1	2	3
Harkemase Boys	1	1	2

Final
Genemuiden	1	0	1
Excelsior Maassluis	3	3	6

==== Quarterfinals ====
29 May 2024
20:00

Blauw Geel '38	2–1	Kozakken Boys

1 June 2024
15:00

Kozakken Boys	2–1 (a.e.t.)	Blauw Geel '38
Penalties
	4–5

3–3 on aggregate. Blauw Geel '38 won 5–4 on penalties

29 May 2024
20:00

TEC	1–0	Genemuiden

1 June 2024
14:30

Genemuiden	5–1	TEC

Genemuiden won 5–2 on aggregate.

29 May 2024
20:00

Harkemase Boys	1–1	SteDoCo

1 June 2024
14:30

SteDoCo	1–1 (a.e.t.)	Harkemase Boys
Penalties
	5–6

2–2 on aggregate. Harkemase Boys won 6–5 on penalties

29 May 2024
20:00

Hercules	1–1	Excelsior Maassluis

1 June 2024
14:30

Excelsior Maassluis	3–0	Hercules

Excelsior Maassluis won 4–1 on aggregate.

==== Semifinals ====
5 June 2024
20:00

Blauw Geel '38	4–3	Genemuiden

8 June 2024
15:30

Genemuiden	4–3 (a.e.t.)	Blauw Geel '38
Penalties
	4–3

7–7 on aggregate. Genemuiden won 4–3 on penalties

5 June 2024
20:00

Harkemase Boys	1–1	Excelsior Maassluis

8 June 2024
15:30

Excelsior Maassluis	2–1	Harkemase Boys

Excelsior Maassluis won 3–2 on aggregate.

==== Final ====
12 June 2024
20:00

Excelsior Maassluis	3–1	Genemuiden

15 June 2024
14:30

Genemuiden	0–3	Excelsior Maassluis

Excelsior Maassluis won 6–1 on aggregate.

=== Derde Divisie promotion/relegation playoffs ===
The teams who finish 15th and 16th in both the Derde Divisie A and B will play relegation playoffs against teams from the Vierde Divisie. The four bracket winners will play in next season's Derde Divisie.

==== Derde Divisie A ====
===== Bracket 1 =====
Semifinals
Staphorst	2	2	4
JOS Watergraafsmeer (a.e.t.)	1	4	5
Scherpenzeel	0	2	2
HBC (p)	0	2	2

Final
JOS Watergraafsmeer	1	0	1
HBC	2	2	4

==== Semifinals ====
29 May 2024
20:00

JOS Watergraafsmeer	1–2	Staphorst

1 June 2024
14:30

Staphorst	2–4 (a.e.t.)	JOS Watergraafsmeer

JOS Watergraafsmeer won 5–4 on aggregate.

29 May 2024

HBC	0–0	Scherpenzeel

1 June 2024

Scherpenzeel	2–2 (a.e.t.)	HBC
Penalties
	3–4

2–2 on aggregate. HBC won 4–3 on penalties.

==== Final ====
5 June 2024

HBC	2–1	JOS Watergraafsmeer

8 June 2024

JOS Watergraafsmeer	0–2	HBC

HBC won 4–1 on aggregate.

===== Bracket 2 =====
Semifinals
Huizen	1	1	2
AZSV	0	1	1
Hoogeveen	3	0	3
ROHDA	1	3	4

Final
Huizen	1	0	1
ROHDA	0	0	0

==== Semifinals ====
29 May 2024

ROHDA	1–3	Hoogeveen

1 June 2024

Hoogeveen	0–3	ROHDA

ROHDA won 4–3 on aggregate.

29 May 2024

AZSV	0–1	Huizen

1 June 2024

Huizen	1–1	AZSV

Huizen won 2–1 on aggregate.

==== Final ====
5 June 2024

ROHDA	0–1	Huizen

8 June 2024

Huizen	0–0	ROHDA

Huizen won 1–0 on aggregate.

==== Derde Divisie B ====
===== Bracket 1 =====
Semifinals
Achilles Veen	3	2	5
Westlandia	0	0	0
AWC	1	0	1
Smitshoek	1	2	3

Final
Achilles Veen	0	0	0
Smitshoek	1	1	2

==== Semifinals ====
29 May 2024

Smitshoek	1–1	AWC

1 June 2024

AWC	0–2	Smitshoek

AWC won 3–1 on aggregate.

29 May 2024

Westlandia	0–3	Achilles Veen

1 June 2024

Achilles Veen	2–0	Westlandia

Achilles Veen won 5–0 on aggregate.

==== Final ====
5 June 2024

Smitshoek	1–0	Achilles Veen

8 June 2024

Achilles Veen	0–1	Smitshoek

Smitshoek won 2–0 on aggregate.

===== Bracket 2 =====
Semifinals
's-Gravenzande	3	2	5
Halsteren	2	0	2
Unitas (p)	1	1	2
Dongen	1	1	2

Final
's-Gravenzande	2	1	3
Unitas	2	0	2

==== Semifinals ====
29 May 2024

Dongen	1–1	Unitas

1 June 2024

Unitas	1–1 (a.e.t.)	Dongen
Penalties
	4–2

2–2 on aggregate. Unitas won 4–2 on penalties

29 May 2024

Halsteren	2–3	's-Gravenzande

1 June 2024

's-Gravenzande	2–0	Halsteren

's-Gravenzande won 5–2 on aggregate.

==== Final ====
5 June 2024

Unitas	2–2	's-Gravenzande

8 June 2024

's-Gravenzande	1–0	Unitas

's-Gravenzande won 3–2 on aggregate.

==== "Second chance" promotion play-off ====
Due to the withdrawal of OSS '20 from the Derde Divisie, the four losing promotion finalists will compete for one last spot in next season's Derde Divisie. The final will be played at a neutral site.

===== Bracket =====
Semifinal
ROHDA	2
Achilles Veen	1
JOS Watergraafsmeer	2
Unitas	3

Final
ROHDA	4
Unitas	0

==== Semifinals ====
12 June 2024
20:00

ROHDA	2–1	Achilles Veen

12 June 2024
20:00

JOS Watergraafsmeer	2–3	Unitas

==== Final ====
15 June 2024
15:00

ROHDA	4–0	Unitas
