= Tiny Ruys =

Dutch football player and coach (1957–2025)

Tiny Ruijs
Personal information
- Full name: Martinus Johannes Maria Ruys
- Date of birth: 8 May 1957
- Place of birth: Cuijk, Netherlands
- Date of death: 11 January 2025 (aged 67)
- Place of death: Riemst, Belgium

Youth career
- JVC '31

Senior career*
Years	Team	Apps	(Gls)
1975–1977	NEC	13	(0)
1977–1986	Fortuna Sittard	225	(61)
Total		238	(61)

Managerial career
- 2001: United Arab Emirates
- 2006–2007: Al Ain (caretaker)
- 2011–2012: Fortuna Sittard
- 2013: MVV
- 2015–2025: SV Meerssen
- 2016–2017: Fortuna Sittard
- 2018–2019: EVV
- * Club domestic league appearances and goals

Martinus Johannes Maria "Tiny" Ruys (8 May 1957 – 11 January 2025) was a Dutch football player and coach.

== Playing career ==
Ruijs joined Fortuna Sittard from NEC and played 231 games for the club, clinching promotion to the Eredivisie with them in 1981. He played in 13 Eredivisie matches for NEC and 65 for Fortuna.

== Managerial career ==
Ruys was in charge of the United Arab Emirates in 2001, and has also managed Dutch club teams Fortuna Sittard and MVV. He left MVV after he was threatened by his own supporters and then managed SV Meerssen and EVV whom he left early due to health issues.

== Death ==
Ruys died on 11 January 2025, at the age of 67.
