= Jens Jurn Streutker =

Dutch footballer (born 1993)

Personal information
- Date of birth: 23 February 1993 (age 33)
- Place of birth: Hoogeveen, Netherlands
- Height: 1.96 m (6 ft 5 in)
- Position: Centre back

Team information
- Current team: Genemuiden
- Number: 3

Youth career
- SV Pesse
- –2007: Groningen
- 2007–2009: Emmen
- 2009–2012: Heerenveen

Senior career*
Years	Team	Apps	(Gls)
2013–2015	Heerenveen	0	(0)
2013–2014	→ Heracles Almelo (loan)	11	(1)
2015	→ MVV (loan)	5	(0)
2015–2016	Emmen	27	(1)
2016–2019	Harkemase Boys	79	(4)
2019–	Genemuiden	79	(12)
- * Club domestic league appearances and goals as of 7 October 2024

Jens Jurn Streutker (born 23 February 1993) is a Dutch professional footballer who plays as a centre back for Derde Divisie club Genemuiden.

He formerly played for SC Heerenveen and on loan for Heracles Almelo and MVV Maastricht, before moving to Harkemase Boys in 2016.
