= Rohda Raalte =

Association football club in Raalte, Netherlands

- Full name: Rooms Katholieke Sportvereniging Recht op het doel af Raalte
- Founded: 20 May 1929; 97 years ago
- Ground: Sportpark Tijenraan, Raalte
- Chairman: Frank van Rossum
- Caretaker coach: Jeroen Giesen
- League: Tweede Divisie
- 2025–26: Derde Divisie A, 1st of 18 (promoted)
- Website: http://www.rohdaraalte.nl/
Home colours

Rooms Katholieke Sportvereniging Recht op het doel af Raalte, also known as ROHDA Raalte or Rohda Raalte, is a football club based in Raalte, Salland, in the province of Overijssel, Netherlands. They play their home matches at the Sportpark Tijenraan. The club's colours are red and yellow.

== History ==
The club had its glory years from 1978 to 1988 when it ended 10 consecutive seasons in the top four of the Hoofdklasse, at that time the highest amateur league. In 1979 it even became overall amateur champions.

In the 2023–24 season, Rohda Raalte qualified for the promotion playoffs. In the first round, Rohda Raalte defeated VV Hoogeveen, after a 3-0 away win in the second leg gave Rohda a 4–3 aggregate victory. In the final, Rohda lost 1–0 on aggregate to SV Huizen. However, after OSS '20 withdrew from the Derde Divisie, Rohda entered a four-team single-elimination promotion tournament with the three other losing finalists. Rohda defeated Achilles Veen 2–1 on aggregate in the semifinal, and then GVV Unitas 4–0 in the final, winning promotion to the Derde Divisie.

=== Current squad ===
As of 28 October 2026

Note: Flags indicate national team as defined under FIFA eligibility rules; some limited exceptions apply. Players may hold more than one non-FIFA nationality.

No.	Pos.	Nation	Player
1	GK	NED	Anthony van Zaltbommel
2	MF	NED	Ivan van den Berg
3	DF	NED	Maurice van Bussel
4	DF	NED	Jon Vossebeld
5	DF	NED	Diego Paais
6	MF	NED	Sven Pazie
7	FW	NED	Martijn van de Werken
8	MF	NED	Max Blanke
9	FW	NED	Teije ten Den
10	MF	NED	Casper van der Veen
11	FW	NED	Rick Vreeswijk
12	FW	NED	Kem Roeloffzen
14	MF	NED	Luuk Schepers
15	MF	GER	Matthias Heiland
16	GK	LBR	Amos Wesseh
17	FW	NED	Ebi Willemsen

No.	Pos.	Nation	Player
18	MF	NED	Tim Maatman
19	FW	NED	Jaydey Hansler
20	DF	NED	Don van Rossum
22	FW	NED	Wesley Hansler
23	DF	NED	Thom Strijland
24	MF	IRQ	Manuel Iylia
25	DF	NED	Gijs Blanke
26	FW	NED	Mert Bulut
27	DF	NED	Sten Brand
28	FW	NED	Fabian te Kolsté
29	DF	ARU	Tyrese Gijsbertha
30	GK	NED	Tymo Bruijns
31	DF	NED	Quinten Jony
32	FW	NED	Dylan Rickhoff
33	FW	NED	Diek Hakstege
34	MF	NED	Siem Askamp
