= Patrick Maneschijn =

Dutch footballer

Personal information
- Date of birth: 4 January 1997 (age 29)
- Place of birth: Deventer, Netherlands
- Height: 1.76 m (5 ft 9 in)
- Position: Winger

Team information
- Current team: Excelsior '31
- Number: 19

Youth career
- –2014: DVV Sallandia
- 2014–2017: Go Ahead Eagles

Senior career*
Years	Team	Apps	(Gls)
2017–2018	Go Ahead Eagles	17	(1)
2018–2019	Sparta Nijkerk	7	(0)
2019–2020	WHC Wezep		
2020–2022	CSV Apeldoorn		
2022–	Excelsior '31		
- * Club domestic league appearances and goals as of 6 January 2023

Patrick Maneschijn (born 4 January 1997) is a Dutch professional footballer who plays as a winger for Excelsior '31.

== Club career ==
He made his Eredivisie debut for Go Ahead Eagles on 14 May 2017 in a game against Sparta Rotterdam.

Ahead of the 2019–20 season, Maneschijn joined WHC Wezep. The following season, he moved to CSV Apeldoorn.
