= Azzedine Dkidak =

Moroccan footballer (born 2000)

Personal information
- Date of birth: 11 May 2000 (age 26)
- Place of birth: Amsterdam, Netherlands
- Height: 1.77 m (5 ft 10 in)
- Positions: Winger; left-back

Team information
- Current team: RKC Waalwijk
- Number: 24

Youth career
- –2019: Vitesse

Senior career*
Years	Team	Apps	(Gls)
2016–2019	Vitesse II	6	(1)
2019–2020	Den Bosch	26	(1)
2020–2022	Como	27	(0)
2022	Potenza	7	(0)
2022–2024	De Treffers	46	(10)
2024–2026	IJsselmeervogels	53	(22)
2026	Spakenburg	0	(0)
2026–	RKC Waalwijk	5	(0)

International career
2016	Morocco U17	2	(0)
- * Club domestic league appearances and goals as of 08:30, 25 September 2026 (UTC)

Azzedine Dkidak (born 11 May 2000) is a professional footballer who plays as a winger or left-back for Eerste Divisie club RKC Waalwijk. Born in the Netherlands, Dkidak represents Morocco internationally.

== Club career ==
After playing youth football with Vitesse and in the Tweede Divisie with Jong Vitesse, Dkidak joined FC Den Bosch on a trial basis on 27 July 2019, before signing a contract with Den Bosch on 9 August 2019. He made his debut for Den Bosch on 12 August 2019 in a 2–2 draw away at Jong PSV.

In August 2020, he signed for Italian side Como in Serie C. For the 2021–22 season, Como was promoted to Serie B and Dkidak made no appearances on that level. On 5 January 2022 he left the club.

On 8 January 2022, he signed with Potenza in Serie C. On 9 December 2022, Dkidak returned to the Netherlands to join De Treffers on a deal until the end of the 2022–23 season.

Dkidak was suspended by IJsselmeervogels in February 2026 after it emerged that he would join rivals Spakenburg on 1 July 2026. He was reinstated a month later. On 1 July, he officially joined Spakenburg, but five days later signed his first professional contract with Eerste Divisie club RKC Waalwijk. The agreement runs for two years and includes an option for an additional season.

== International career ==
Dkidak was born in Amsterdam and is of Moroccan descent. He represented the Morocco U17s at the 2017 Montaigu Tournament.
