= Achilles Veen =

Association football club in Veen, Netherlands

- Full name: Achilles Veen
- Founded: 7 June 1944; 82 years ago
- Ground: De Heuye, Veen
- Chairman: Henk Schreuders
- Manager: Dennis van der Steen
- League: Derde Divisie
- 2025–26: Vierde Divisie C, 1st of 16 (promoted)
- Website: http://www.achillesveen.nl/
Home colours

Achilles Veen is a football club based in Veen, Netherlands. Founded in 1944, they are currently members of the Derde Divisie, the fourth tier of the Dutch football league system. They play their home matches at De Heuye.

== History ==
On 27 October 2021, Achilles Veen defeated GVV Unitas 4–0 to advance to the second round of the 2021–22 KNVB Cup. It was the only Hoofdklasse side to advance to the second round in that season's competition.

In the 2023–24 season, Achilles Veen qualified for the promotion playoffs. They defeated RKVV Westlandia 5–0 on aggregate in the first round, before losing 2–0 on aggregate to VV Smitshoek. But due to OSS '20's withdrawal from the Derde Divisie, Achilles Veen entered a four-team single-elimination promotion tournament with the three other losing finalists. However, Achilles Veen lost 2–1 to Rohda Raalte in the semifinal.
