= VV Dongen =

Association football club in Dongen, Netherlands

- Full name: Voetbalvereniging Dongen
- Nickname: Kanaries (Canaries)
- Founded: 1 August 1923; 102 years ago
- Ground: De Biezen, Dongen
- Chairman: John Paul Verkooijen
- Manager: Marcel van der Sloot
- League: Derde Divisie
- 2025–26: Vierde Divisie C, 4th of 16 (promoted via play-offs)
- Website: http://www.vvdongen.nl/
Home colours

VV Dongen is a football club based in Dongen, North Brabant, Netherlands. VV Dongen has approximately 900 members making 11 senior teams (1 women team), 12 junior teams (2 girl teams) and 25 pupil teams (23 girl teams). It plays at sports accommodation de Biezen in Dongen.

== History ==
=== 20th century ===
The club was founded in 1923, when DVC and Olympia merged. The club's first name was Dongense Sportvereniging Dongen-Vooruit (Dongen Sports club Dongen Forward). The club colors were black and white. In 1944 the club's name was changed to VV Dongen. Four years earlier, the colors were changed to yellow and blue.

=== 21st century ===
In 2008, Dongen won its first Tweede Klasse section championship. It promoted to the Eerste Klasse, and in 2010 to the Hoofdklasse through another section championship. In 2016 it won a section championship in the Hoofdklasse and promoted to the Derde Divisie.

In the 2022–23 season, Dongen finished 17th and were relegated to the Vierde Divisie.

In the 2023–24 season, the first one after being relegated, Dongen qualified for the promotion playoffs.
