= Gregory Kuisch =

Dutch footballer (born 2000)

Personal information
- Date of birth: 14 March 2000 (age 26)
- Place of birth: Gouda, Netherlands
- Height: 1.83 m (6 ft 0 in)
- Position: Right-back

Team information
- Current team: Quick Boys
- Number: 15

Youth career
- –2008: USV Hercules
- 2008–2019: PSV

Senior career*
Years	Team	Apps	(Gls)
2019–2021	Jong PSV	4	(0)
2019–2020	→ Roeselare (loan)	2	(0)
2021–2022	VfB Lübeck	10	(0)
2022–2023	Hønefoss	19	(4)
2024–2026	IJsselmeervogels	56	(2)
2026–	Quick Boys	6	(0)

International career
2017	Netherlands U18	1	(0)
- * Club domestic league appearances and goals as of 12:46, 25 October 2026 (UTC)

Gregory Kuisch (born 14 March 2000) is a Dutch footballer who plays as a right back for Tweede Divisie club Quick Boys.

== Career statistics ==
=== Club ===
As of 13 October 2019

Club	Season	League			National Cup		Europe		Other		Total	
Club	Season	Division	Apps	Goals	Apps	Goals	Apps	Goals	Apps	Goals	Apps	Goals
Jong PSV	2019–20	Eerste Divisie	2	0	0	0	–		0	0	2	0
Roeselare (loan)	2019–20	Proximus League	0	0	0	0	–		0	0	0	0
Career total			2	0	0	0	0	0	0	0	2	0
