= Chahine van Bohemen =

Footballer (born 2004)

Personal information
- Full name: Chahine Jilali van Bohemen
- Date of birth: 25 January 2004 (age 22)
- Place of birth: Drachten, Netherlands
- Height: 1.73 m (5 ft 8 in)
- Position: Left-back

Team information
- Current team: IJsselmeervogels
- Number: 33

Youth career
- –2014: Hoogland
- 2014–2019: Vitesse
- 2019–2023: Ajax

Senior career*
Years	Team	Apps	(Gls)
2023	Jong Ajax	2	(0)
2023–2025	Al-Jazira	2	(0)
2025–	IJsselmeervogels	25	(2)

International career^{‡}
2019	Netherlands U15	4	(0)
2019	Netherlands U16	3	(0)
2023	Morocco U20	2	(1)
- * Club domestic league appearances and goals as of 22:49, 26 May 2026 (UTC)~ ‡ National team caps and goals as of 09:29, 11 July 2023 (UTC)

Chahine Jilali van Bohemen (born 25 January 2004) is a professional footballer who plays as a left-back for Tweede Divisie club IJsselmeervogels. Born in the Netherlands, he has represented Morocco internationally since 2022.

== Club career ==
Born in the Netherlands to a Dutch father and a Moroccan mother, Van Bohemen played locally as a child for VV Hoogland before he joined the academy of Vitesse Arnhem at ten years old. He joined the AFC Ajax academy in 2019. He plays predominantly as a left-back and has gained a reputation for the ability to score direct from free-kicks. In December 2022 van Bohemen announced his choice would be to represent Morocco internationally.

Van Bohemen made his professional debut for Jong Ajax against FC Eindhoven on 6 January 2023 in a 1–1 draw in the Eerste Divisie. The following week, he made his first start for Jong Ajax, away against De Graafschap.

=== Al Jazira ===
On August 4, 2023, he has signed with Emirati club Al-Jazira.

== International career ==
Born in the Netherlands, van Bohemen was called up to the Netherlands national youth teams at under-15 and under-16 respectively.

In 2022, van Bohemen switched his national allegiance to Morocco, after being called up in December. He went on to make his international debut for the under-20 side in 2023.
