= Segun Owobowale =

Dutch footballer (born 1997)

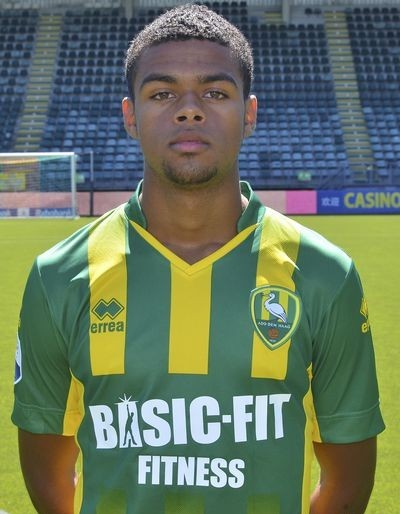
- Owobowale in 2015

Personal information
- Date of birth: 17 August 1997 (age 29)
- Place of birth: Leiden, Netherlands
- Height: 1.82 m (6 ft 0 in)
- Position: Attacking midfielder

Team information
- Current team: VVSB
- Number: 20

Youth career
- –2014: ADO Den Haag

Senior career*
Years	Team	Apps	(Gls)
2014–2016	ADO Den Haag	2	(0)
2016–2018	NEC	2	(0)
2019–2020	Jong ADO Den Haag	6	(0)
2020–2021	Noordwijk	5	(1)
2021–2024	AFC	55	(0)
2024–	VVSB	23	(3)

International career
2013–2014	Netherlands U17	13	(4)
2014–2015	Netherlands U18	8	(0)
- * Club domestic league appearances and goals as of 20 July 2025

Segun Owobowale (born 17 August 1997) is a Dutch professional footballer who plays as an attacking midfielder for Derde Divisie club VVSB.

== Club career ==
Owobowale is a youth exponent from ADO Den Haag. He made his Eredivisie debut on 30 August 2014 in a 3–2 away defeat against SC Cambuur.

On 26 March 2021, he joined third-tier club AFC.

== International career ==
Owobowale was born in the Netherlands to a Nigerian father and a Dutch mother. He is a former youth international for the Netherlands.
