= SV Huizen =

Association football club in Huizen, Netherlands

- Full name: Sportvereniging Huizen
- Founded: 1 January 1927; 99 years ago
- Ground: De Wolfskamer, Huizen
- Capacity: 5,000, grandstand with 1,000 seats
- Chairman: Klaas Vos
- Manager: Arnold Klein
- League: Derde Divisie
- 2024–25: Derde Divisie A, 14th of 18
- Website: http://www.svhuizen.nl/
Home colours

Sportvereniging Huizen is a football club based in Huizen, North Holland, Netherlands. They are currently members of the Derde Divisie, the fourth tier of the Dutch football league system. They play their home matches at the 5,000-capacity De Wolfskamer.

== History ==
The club became Dutch national amateur champions in 1974 and in 2003. In 2001, Huizen won the Regional Cup of the now defunct Central soccer district. In 2016 it Huizen promoted to the Derde Divisie. In 2017 it relegated back to the Hoofdklasse. In 2018 it relegated once again, to the Eerste Klasse. In 2022, Huizen promoted to the Vierde Divisie, after winning an Eerste Klasse section championship.

In the 2023–24 season, Huizen qualified for the promotion playoffs. After beating AZSV 2–1 on aggregate in the first round, Huizen defeated Rohda Raalte 1–0 on aggregate and won promotion to the Derde Divisie.
