= SV Meerssen =

Dutch football club

- Full name: Sportvereniging Meerssen
- Founded: 18 March 1918
- Ground: Marsana, Meerssen
- Chairman: Wil Kusters
- Manager: Tini Ruijs
- League: Derde Divisie
- 2023–24: Derde Divisie B, 7th of 18
- Website: http://www.svmeerssen.nl/
Home colours

SV Meerssen is a football club from Meerssen, Netherlands. Meerssen plays in the Derde Divisie.

== History ==
Meerssen became Hoofdklasse champions in the 1993–94 and 2002–03 seasons. At that time, the Hoofdklasse was the highest tier of Dutch amateur football.

Meerssen won the 1990, 2004 and 2007 KNVB District Cup in the Zuid 2 (South 2) District. Because of the victory in 2007, Meerssen got to play a match against AZ Alkmaar in the third round of the KNVB Beker. They didn't stand a chance against the team that plays in the Eredivisie and lost the game 10–1.

Also a couple of famous Dutch football coaches and players started their career at Meerssen. Bert van Marwijk coached the team between 1995 and 1998. Wim Dusseldorp started his soccer career at Meerssen, just as Erik Meijer did.
