= Blauw Geel '38 =

Dutch football club

Blauw Geel'38
- Full name: sv Blauw Geel '38/Jumbo
- Founded: 21 June 1938; 88 years ago
- Ground: Prins Willem Alexander Sportpark, Veghel
- Capacity: 2,500
- Chairman: Robert van de Broeck
- Manager: Maurice Verbunt
- League: Derde Divisie
- 2025–26: Derde Divisie B, 9th of 18
- Website: http://www.blauwgeel.nl/
Home colours

Blauw Geel '38 is a football club from Veghel, Netherlands. Blauw Geel '38 plays in the Derde Divisie, the fourth tier of football in the Netherlands.

== History ==
=== 2023–24 playoff run ===
In the 2023–24 season, Blauw Geel '38 finished 3rd in the Derde Divisie B, qualifying for the promotion playoffs. In the first round, they defeated Kozakken Boys on penalties after a 3–3 aggregate draw.

In the playoff semifinals, Blauw Geel '38 faced SC Genemuiden. Blauw Geel took a 4–3 lead into the second leg, and scored first in the second leg. Genemuiden scored twice unanswered, sending the match to extra time tied 5–5 on aggregate. Genemuiden scored twice at the start of extra time, taking a 7–5 aggregate lead. However, Blauw Geel scored in the 116th and 121st minutes to send the match to penalties. However, Genemuiden prevailed 4–3 on penalties, advancing to the playoff final.

== See also ==
- Category:Blauw Geel '38 players
