= SV Urk =

- Full name: Sportvereniging Urk
- Nickname: SVU
- Founded: 29 July 1940
- Ground: De Vormt
- Capacity: 1,000
- Chairman: Dick Hellinga
- Manager: Gert-Jan Karsten
- League: Vierde Divisie
- 2025–26: Derde Divisie A, 17th of 18 (relegated)
- Website: http://www.svurk.nl/
Home colours	Away colours

SV Urk is a football club from Urk, Netherlands. Urk plays in the Vierde Divisie.

== History ==
The club became champions in the Hoofdklasse in 1996 and in 2000. At that time the Hoofdklasse was the highest amateur league in the Netherlands. Urk won the Districtsbeker in the East district in 1985. SV Urk is also known as a club that produces a lot of young talent.
