= VV Hoogeveen =

Association football club in Hoogeveen, Netherlands

Hoogeveen
- Full name: Veldvoetbal Voetbalvereniging Hoogeveen
- Founded: 29 April 1930; 95 years ago
- Ground: Sportpark Bentinckspark, Hoogeveen
- Capacity: 6,000
- Chairman: Stef Lamberink
- League: Derde Divisie
- 2024–25: Vierde Divisie D, 1st of 16 (promoted)
Home colours

Veldvoetbal Voetbalvereniging Hoogeveen is a football club based in Hoogeveen, Netherlands. It is currently member of the Derde Divisie, the fourth tier of the Dutch football league system. Hoogeveen play its home matches at the 6,000-capacity Sportpark Bentinckspark. The club's colours are blue and white.

== History ==
VV Hoogeveen was founded on 29 April 1930 and has about 650 members. It plays home matches at Bentickspark. It host football for seniors, junior teams, futsal and women. After the founding of the Hoofdklasse in 1973 VV Hoogeveen soon joined. In 1975 the club promoted to what was then the highest amateur league. The biggest success of the club came in 1978, when the team became champion of the ‘Hoofdklasse B’ and ‘Dutch amateur champion’ of the Sunday ‘Hoofdklasse’. In subsequent years VV Hoogeveen managed to play many additional seasons in the ‘Hoofdklasse’.

In the 2021–22 season, Hoogeveen qualified for the promotion playoffs, but lost 5–2 on aggregate to VV Hoogland in the first round.

In the 2022–23 season, Hoogeveen won the Vierde Divisie Sunday A, earning promotion to the Derde Divisie.

In their first year in the Derde Divisie, Hoogeveen finished 16th in the Derde Divisie A, and had to play in the relegation playoffs. Despite a 3–1 away win vs. Rohda Raalte in the first leg of the first round, Hoogeveen collapsed in the second leg, losing 3–0 and 4–3 on aggregate. The result meant that Hoogeveen were relegated back to the Vierde Divisie after just one year at the fourth tier.

=== Overview ===
- 1931: Promotion to 1e Klasse Noordelijke VB
- 1935: Promotion to 3e Klasse KNVB
- 1939: Relegation to 4e Klasse KNVB
- 1943: Relegation to de Drentse Voetbalbond
- 1949: Promotion to 4e Klasse KNVB
- 1951: Promotion to 3e Klasse KNVB
- 1954: Relegation to 4e Klasse KNVB
- 1960: Promotion to 3e Klasse KNVB
- 1966: Promotion to 2e Klasse KNVB
- 1973: Promotion to 1e Klasse KNVB
- 1974: Promotion to Hoofdklasse
- 1978: Champions Hoofdklasse B
- 1978: Dutch Champions Sunday Amateurs
- 1982: Relegation 1e Klasse KNVB
- 1984: Promotion Hoofdklasse
- 1991: Relegation 1e Klasse KNVB
- 1994: Relegation 2e Klasse KNVB
- 1996: Promotion 1e Klasse KNVB
- 1997: Promotion Hoofdklasse
- 1998: Relegation 1e Klasse KNVB

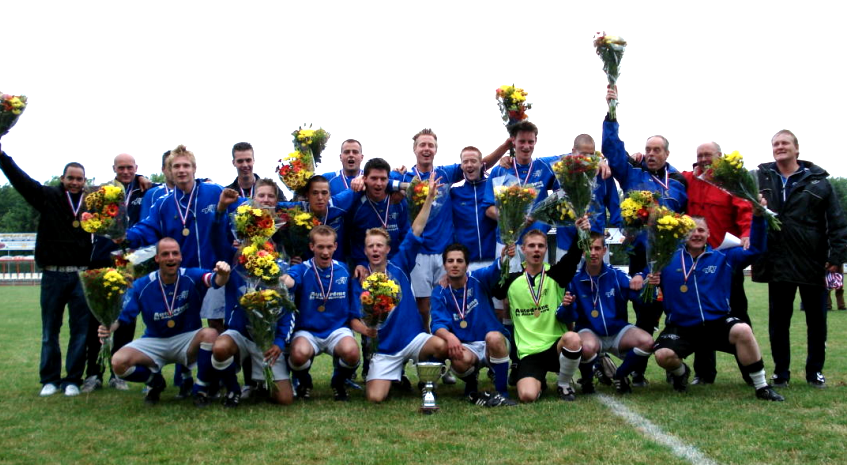
Celebration of the 2008 win of the Northern Amateur Cup

- 1999: Relegation 2e Klasse KNVB
- 2000: Promotion 1e Klasse KNVB
- 2001: Promotion Hoofdklasse
- 2005: Relegation 1e Klasse KNVB
- 2010: Promotion Hoofdklasse

=== Honours ===
- 1978: Champions Hoofdklasse B (Sunday)
- 1978: Dutch Champions Sunday Amateurs
- 1980: Noordelijke Districtsbeker (Northern amateur Cup)
- 2008: Noordelijke Districtsbeker (Northern amateur Cup)

== Accommodation ==
=== Stadium ===
VV Hoogeveen plays in a small stadium close to the town centre. The stadium has a capacity of about 6,000 spectators, of which 500 can sit and another 500 can stand underneath roofs. The accommodation encompasses two other fields and two youth pitches where other teams can play their matches.

=== Attendance ===
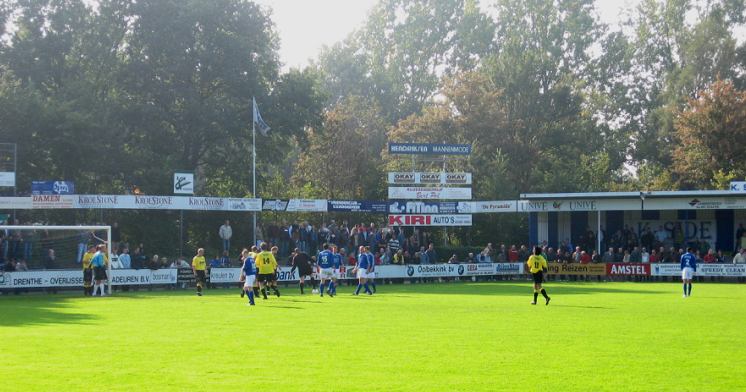
A home match in 2007

- Seizoen 2002–2003: 528 (hoofdklasse)
- Seizoen 2003–2004: 554 (hoofdklasse)
- Seizoen 2004–2005: 458 (hoofdklasse)
- Seizoen 2005–2006: 475 (1e klasse)
- Seizoen 2006–2007: 400 (1e klasse)
- Seizoen 2007–2008: 535 (1e klasse)
- Seizoen 2008–2009: 480 (1e klasse)
- Seizoen 2009–2010: 455 (1e klasse)
- Seizoen 2010–2011: 473 (Hoofdklasse)
- Seizoen 2011–2012: 380 (Hoofdklasse)
- Seizoen 2012–2013: 355 (Hoofdklasse)

== Support ==
=== Businessclub ===
The Businessclub Hoogeveen was founded in 1993 to provide additional support to the football club, both at a recreational and competitive level. Also, it provides the opportunity for local and regional business to meet and liaise. It has over 130 members and is one of the biggest and most active business clubs in the north of the Netherlands.

=== Fans ===
The fans have united themselves in the 'Supportersvereniging VV Hoogeveen', founded in 1949. Next to its support for VV Hoogeveen, it hosts a number of activities for its fans and helps in the organisation of events.
