= JOS Watergraafsmeer =

Dutch football club

Coordinates: 52°20′28″N 4°55′53″E

- Full name: Jeugd Organisatie Sportclub Watergraafsmeer
- Founded: 7 February 1920; 106 years ago
- Ground: Sportpark Drieburg, Amsterdam, Netherlands
- Capacity: 1,500
- League: Vierde Divisie
- 2025–26: Vierde Divisie A, 2nd of 16
- Website: http://www.joswgm.nl/
Home colours

JOS Watergraafsmeer is an association football club from the Amsterdam district Watergraafsmeer. In 2010 the club had around 500 registered members. The Saturday team plays in the Derde Klasse, while the Sunday team competes in the Vierde Divisie.

== History ==
=== 20th century: Origins and founding ===
The club came into its current formation in 1995 after the fusion of two clubs from Watergraafsmeer, Jeugd Organisatie Sportclub (JOS, founded 1920) and Watergraafsmeer (1988). The Watergraafsmeer club was a result of six clubs amalgamating into one, TIW (Trainen Is Winnen, 1921), Amstel (1905), RNC, TDO (Training Doet Overwinnen, 1915), WMHO (Wie Moed Houdt Overwint, 1934) and Ontwaakt (1923).

Former manager and head coach of local giants AFC Ajax, Rinus Michels began his coaching career at JOS, managing the club from 1960 until 1964 before moving to AFC for a season, and then to Ajax a year later. Former Ajax player and Dutch Olympian Jaap Knol was the chairman of the club at the time. Former players who later made the step over to a professional club include Ruud Suurendonk, Johnny Beun, Jos Dijkstra and Ab Parree. JOS has been known to be a feeder club of sorts for AFC Ajax.

The singer Henk Hofstede of the Dutch pop group The Nits wrote the song "JOS days" on the album In the Dutch mountains (1987) about the club. In the song he sings about the monument of War victims and speaks on the shameful fact of not being accepted at the club as the first born of the family. The monument of JOS has since been demolished, there are however still monuments dedicated to fallen members of football clubs from the War that are still standing elsewhere in the Netherlands.

=== 21st century: Hoofdklasse and other leagues ===
JOS Watergraafsmeer's Sunday first team were promoted to the Hoofdklasse ahead of the 2009–10 season, where the finished in 3rd place. The top 3 clubs are automatically promoted leading to JOS competing in the Sunday Hoofdklasse A the following season, relegating back to the Eerste Divisie.

In 2014, the club's Sunday team were promoted back to the Hoofdklasse, playing on the highest level of Amateur football and the fourth tier in the Netherlands once more. While competing in the 2014–15 KNVB Cup, the team advanced to the Second Round of the competition after defeating VV Noordwijk in a 2–1 win, where they then faced the first team of AFC Ajax marking the first official Amsterdam derby to be contest in the city since 1983. On 24 September 2014 the two teams meet at the historic Olympic Stadium where JOS Watergaafsmeer would be eliminated in a 9–0 loss, in which Ajax striker Arkadiusz Milik scored six goals. Davey van ’t Schip, the Son of former Ajax player and assistant manager John van 't Schip was playing for JOS Watergraafsmeer in the match as well.

In the 2023–24 season, JOS Watergaafsmeer finished 3rd in the Vierde Divisie A, qualifying for the promotion playoffs. After defeating VV Staphorst 5–4 on aggregate in the first round, JOS Watergaafsmeer lost to RKSV HBC in the final. However, due to the withdrawal of OSS '20 from the Derde Divisie, JOS Watergaafsmeer entered a single-elimination playoff tournament with the three other losing finalists. JOS Watergaafsmeer lost 3–2 to GVV Unitas in the semifinal of this tournament.
