= FC 's-Gravenzande =

Association football club in 's-Gravenzande, Netherlands

- Full name: Footballclub 's-Gravenzande
- Founded: 1 July 2010; 15 years ago
- Ground: Juliana Sportpark, 's-Gravenzande
- Chairman: Leo van der Lans
- Manager: Mike Jonk
- League: Vierde Divisie
- 2024–25: Derde Divisie B, 16th of 18 (relegated via play-offs)
- Website: http://www.fcsgravenzande.nl/
Home colours

FC 's-Gravenzande is a football club based in 's-Gravenzande, Netherlands. Founded in 2010 from a merger between s-Gravenzandse VV and s-Gravenzandse SV.

== History ==
In the 2023–24 season, FC 's-Gravenzande reached the promotion play-offs. They defeated RKSV Halsteren 5–2 on aggregate in the first round, before overcoming GVV Unitas 3–2 on aggregate in the second round, including a 1–0 home win in the decisive leg. With the result, the club secured promotion to the Derde Divisie for the first time in its history.

The following season, they were relegated back to the Vierde Divisie after losing to RKSV Groene Ster in the play-offs.
