= FC Rijnvogels =

Dutch football club

- Full name: FusieClub Rijnvogels
- Founded: 29 May 2004
- Ground: Sportpark de Kooltuin, Katwijk
- Capacity: 1,000
- League: Derde Divisie
- 2023–24: Derde Divisie A, 10th of 18
- Website: http://www.fcrijnvogels.nl/
Home colours

FC Rijnvogels is a football club from Katwijk, Netherlands. It plays in the 2024–25 Derde Divisie, the fourth tier of football in the Netherlands.

== History ==
In the 2016–17 KNVB Cup, Rijnvogels won against Groene Ster and AFC '34, then lost against Cambuur.

In the 2024–25 KNVB Cup first round, Rijnvogels lost 7–0 at home vs. Eerste Divisie club FC Eindhoven.
