= RKVV DEM =

Dutch football club

DEM
- Full name: Rooms Katholieke Voetbalvereniging Door Eendracht Macht
- Founded: 1 October 1922; 103 years ago
- Ground: Sportpark Adrichem, Beverwijk
- Manager: Ron Bouman
- League: Vierde Divisie
- 2024–25: Derde Divisie A, 17th of 18 (relegated)
- Website: https://www.rkvvdem.nl/
Home colours

RKVV DEM, an abbreviation for Rooms Katholieke Voetbalvereniging Door Eendracht Macht, is a Dutch association football club from Beverwijk. Its colors are a white shirt with a blue 'V', blue pants, and blue socks.

== History ==
RKVV DEM was founded on 1 October 1922 as RKVV DES, short for "Door Eendracht Sterk". After another club with the name was detected the name was changed to DEM.

From 1940 to 2018, the Sunday male team hovered mostly between the Derde Klasse, Tweede Klasse and Eerste Klasse, with a limited number of seasons also in Vierde Klasse. In 2018 it reached the Hoofdklasse through playoffs.

The first squad won a 2018–19 championship in the Hoofdklasse. It was led by coach Arvid Smit. In 2019–20 it plays in the Derde Divisie, just one year after it reached the Hoofdklasse for the very first time.
