= VV Staphorst =

Dutch football club

- Full name: Voetbalvereniging Staphorst
- Founded: 30 November 1959; 65 years ago
- Ground: Het Noorderslag, Staphorst
- Capacity: 2,500
- Chairman: Benny Miggels
- Manager: Richard Karrenbelt
- League: Derde Divisie
- 2024–25: Vierde Divisie D, 2nd of 16 (promoted via play-offs)
- Website: vvstaphorst.nl
| Home colours | Away colours |

Voetbalvereniging Staphorst is a Dutch football club based in the town of Staphorst, in the province of Overijssel. Founded in 1959, the club competes in the Derde Divisie, the fourth tier of the Dutch football league system.

Staphorst play their home matches at Sportpark Het Noorderslag and traditionally wear yellow and blue. While primarily an amateur club, they have been regular participants in the national KNVB Cup and are known for a strong regional following.

== History ==
VV Staphorst was founded on 30 November 1959.

In the National 2011–12 KNVB Cup Staphorst won first round 4–2 against RKSV Groene Ster. In the second round it played in Het Noorderslag against VV Montfoort in the second round. Montfoort player Joost van Apeldoorn was sent out with a red card in minute 59. With one more player on the field, Staphorst scored twice and went on to the third round. In the third round it lost 4–2 against Sparta Nijkerk.

After finishing 15th in the 2023–24 Derde Divisie A, Staphorst had to play in the relegation playoffs. In the first round, they lost to JOS Watergraafsmeer 5–4 on aggregate and were relegated to the Vierde Divisie.

== Honours ==
| Honour | Year(s) |
|---|---|
| Tweede Klasse; KNVB District North champions | 2000–01 |
| Derde Klasse; KNVB District North champions | 1999–2000 |
| Vierde Klasse | 1976–77, 1996–97 |
| KNVB Amateur Cup | 2015–16 |
| KNVB District Cup; KNVB District North winner | 2015–16, 2016–17 |
