= SC Genemuiden =

Association football club in Genemuiden, Netherlands

Genemuiden
- Full name: Sportclub Genemuiden
- Founded: 22 October 1930; 96 years ago
- Ground: Sportpark de Wetering; Genemuiden
- Capacity: 5,900
- Chairman: Luuk Drost
- Manager: René van der Weij
- League: Derde Divisie
- 2025–26: Derde Divisie A, 5th of 18
Home colours

Sportclub Genemuiden is a football club based in Genemuiden, Netherlands. It plays its home matches at the 5,900-capacity Sportpark de Wetering.

== History ==
The club was founded on 22 October 1930, and has played exclusively at amateur level in all its history. Genemuiden was part of the Hoofdklasse league in the 2009–10 season, which it completed in fifth place in the Saturday C group, then winning promotion to the newly established Topklasse league for the inaugural 2010–11 season through playoffs. After being relegated in 2012–13 to the Hoofdklasse, it returned to the Topklasse by winning the Saturday C title the next season.

In the 2021–22 season, Genemuiden qualified for the promotion playoffs, but lost 3–2 on aggregate to SC Feyenoord in the first round.

In the 2023–24 season, their first in the Derde Divisie, Genemuiden qualified for the Tweede Divisie promotion playoffs. It defeated SV TEC 5–2 on aggregate in the first round, before advancing past Blauw Geel '38 on penalties in the second round. However, in the promotion final, Genemuiden lost 6–1 on aggregate to Excelsior Maassluis, and remained in the Derde Divisie.
