= OJC Rosmalen =

Dutch football club

- Full name: Ontspanning Door Inspanning Juliana Combinatie Rosmalen
- Founded: 1 August 1910; 115 years ago
- Ground: Sportpark De Groote Wielen; Rosmalen
- Capacity: 1,000
- Chairman: Paul Logtens
- Manager: Dennis Dekkers
- League: Vierde Divisie
- 2024–25: Derde Divisie B, 15th of 18 (relegated via play-offs)
Home colours	Away colours

Ontspanning Door Inspanning Juliana Combinatie Rosmalen, commonly known as OJC Rosmalen, is a Dutch football club based in Rosmalen, North Brabant. The club competes in the Vierde Divisie, the fifth tier of the Dutch football league system.

OJC Rosmalen was formed in 1947 through a merger between Juliana, founded in 1917 in Hintham, and ODI (Ontspanning Door Inspanning), established in 1910 in Rosmalen. It is the largest amateur football club in the region in terms of membership.

The club plays its home matches at Sportpark De Groote Wielen, located in the northern part of Rosmalen, and traditionally wears red and black.
