= ADO '20 =

Dutch football club

- Full name: Aanhouden Doet Overwinnen 1920
- Nickname: De Superezels (The Superdonkeys)
- Founded: 1920; 106 years ago
- Ground: Sportpark De Vlotter; Heemskerk, Netherlands
- Capacity: 6,000
- Chairman: René van der Wijst
- Manager: Raymond Bronkhorst
- League: Derde Divisie
- 2025–26: Derde Divisie A, 4th of 18
Home colours

Aanhouden Doet Overwinnen 1920, simply known as ADO '20, is a Dutch association football club from Heemskerk. They are currently playing in the Dutch Tweede Divisie. The club was founded on 15 May 1920 as Aanhouden Doet Overwinnen 1920. The home games are played at Sportpark de Vlotter.

In February 2007, ADO '20 entered into a partnership with AZ Alkmaar in the field of youth development, knowledge exchange and scouting. This partnership has enabled ADO '20 to improve its youth academy. The most renowned youth prospect of the ADO '20 academy has been Jeffrey Gouweleeuw, who also played professionally for AZ. His move to German Bundesliga club FC Augsburg in January 2016 meant, that ADO '20 received a development fee which was used for renovating the main stand on Sportpark de Vlotter, since named the "Jeffrey Gouweleeuw Stand". In February 2018, ADO '20 entered into a partnership with Ajax.

The main rival of ADO '20 is ODIN '59, who also come from Heemskerk.
