= TOGB =

Association football club in Berkel en Rodenrijs, Netherlands

- Full name: Tot Ons Genoegen Berkel
- Founded: 28 October 1928; 96 years ago
- Ground: Sportpark Het Hoge Land; Berkel en Rodenrijs, Netherlands
- Capacity: 1,800
- Chairman: Andy Wibier
- Manager: Jonathan Jonk
- League: Derde Divisie
- 2024–25: Derde Divisie B, 13th of 18
Home colours

TOGB is a football club from Berkel en Rodenrijs, Netherlands. The club was founded in 1928. Its first squad plays in the Derde Divisie since 2022.

The club was established on 28 October 1928 as TOGB, a Dutch abbreviation for Tot Ons Genoegen Berkel (English translation: To our delight Berkel). Former players include Roland Bergkamp, Dwight Eli and Tim Vincken.

== History ==
=== 20th century ===
TOGB was founded on 28 October 1928 on grounds behind the Roman Catholic church of Berkel en Rodenrijs. Originally established to quell Sunday afternoon boredom, due to the fact that there was not much to do in the village, young men had looked for entertainment in the nearby Rotterdam – which was not always appreciated in the largely Catholic town. At that time, it was considered a sin to visit dance pavilions or a cinema. However, around that time, football fans started to make their voices heard, as the results of Rotterdam clubs such as Feyenoord, Sparta and Xerxes were followed closely.

TOGB would go on to see an increase in membership through the next years, as football became more popular in the area. The first matches were played in an orchard in Berkel, where the ball became deflated within a few weeks because the sport was played on klompen (whole foot clogs). Eventually, the club began playing football where the Sterrenwijk is now.

Through the years, its Catholic heritage became a hallmark of the club, with large families with a Catholic background making their mark on TOGB. These included the Olsthoorn brothers and the Vermeulen family. TOGB spent most of its existence in the lower tiers of Dutch football.

=== 21st century ===
TOGB reached the Hoofdklasse in 2020; the first club of Lansingerland Municipality to reach the fifth tier of Dutch football ever. In 2022, TOGB won a section championship in the Hoofdklasse and automatically promoted to the Derde Divisie.

== See also ==
- Category:TOGB players
