= OSS '20 =

Dutch football club

- Full name: Sportvereniging Oefening Staalt Spieren 1920
- Founded: 1 June 1920; 105 years ago
- Ground: Sportpark De Rusheuvel, Oss
- Capacity: 1,500
- League: Derde Divisie
- 2023–24: Derde Divisie B, 14th of 18
- Website: http://www.oss20.nl/
Home colours

SV OSS '20 (ackronym and backronym for Sportvereniging Oefening Staalt Spieren 1920, sometimes styled as Oss '20) is a football club from Oss, Netherlands.

== History ==
=== 1920s–1930s: First years in Roman Catholic and regional leagues ===
The club was founded on 1 June 1920 with the name Oss self-styled in caps, as a backronym standing for "exercise strengthens muscles". It joined the 3rd league of the Roman Catholic Federation, gradually progressing to the first league.

With the support of the younger generation, the club switched on 19 September 1927 to the Brabant Football Association (BVB). The older generation objected and priest Marcus, who had been with the club since the start, resigned from his function of "spiritual adviser". In 1928 an athletics department was set up.

The discussion within the club about the transition to the religion-neutral Brabant League continued. In 1933 the club returned to the Roman Catholic Federation.

=== 1940s–1990s: Hovering between Vierde and Tweede Klasse of the KNVB ===
In 1940, under German occupation, all football associations were fused to one.

In 1955, a merger proposal with SV Top resulting in entry into professional football was rejected by the members of Oss '20.

=== 2000s–2010s: The great ascent from Derde Klasse to Derde Divisie ===
In 2009, Oss '20 became champion of the First Division C of district South I. A first stint of the club in Sunday Hoofdklasse B followed. Not for long as Oss '20 returned to the Eerste Klasse after just one season.

During the 2013–2015 seasons, Oss '20 was strengthened by Richard van der Venne. On 29 March 2017 Oss '20 won the second period title of the 2016–2017 season. At the end of January 2018 Oss '20 leads the Sunday Hoofdklasse. It won the championship and promoted to the Derde Divisie. In the first year in the Derde Divisie, Oss '20 already made it to the promotion playoff, without promoting to the Tweede Divisie.

== See also ==
- Category:OSS '20 players
