= UDI '19 =

Dutch football club

- Full name: Uitspanning Door Inspanning 1919
- Founded: 11 May 1919; 106 years ago
- Ground: Sportpark Parkzicht, Uden
- Capacity: 1,500
- League: Derde Divisie
- 2024–25: Vierde Divisie C, 1st of 16 (promoted)
- Website: http://www.udi19.nl/
Home colours

Uitspanning Door Inspanning 1919, mainly known as UDI '19, is a football club based in the town of Uden, Netherlands, that competes in the Derde Divisie, the fourth tier of the Dutch football league system.

Founded on 11 May 1919, the team plays its home matches at Sportpark Parkzicht. The team sports red, white, and blue as its colours.
