= Excelsior '31 =

Dutch football club

- Full name: Sportvereniging Excelsior '31
- Founded: May 31, 1931
- Ground: Sportpark De Koerbelt; Rijssen
- Capacity: 4,150
- Chairman: Harald Eertink
- Manager: Peter Wesselink
- League: Derde Divisie
- 2025–26: Derde Divisie A, 14th of 18
Home colours	Away colours

Sportvereniging Excelsior '31 is a football club from Rijssen, Netherlands. It was founded on 31 May 1931. It plays Hoofdklasse since 2014, when it relegated from the Topklasse. Excelsior'31 became champions in the Hoofdklasse in 2019 and got promoted to the derde divisie, the fourth tier of Dutch Football. It had been promoted to the Topklasse in 2010.
