= Sportlust '46 =

Dutch football club

- Full name: Zaterdag Sportvereniging Sportlust '46
- Founded: 5 October 1946; 79 years ago
- Ground: Sportpark Cromwijck, Woerden
- Capacity: 3,500
- Chairman: Patrick Lammertse
- Head coach: Willem Romp
- League: Derde Divisie
- 2024–25: Derde Divisie A, 3rd of 18
- Website: http://www.sportlust46.nl/
Home colours

Zaterdag Sportvereniging Sportlust '46, more commonly known as ZSV Sportlust '46 or simply Sportlust '46 (Dutch pronunciation: [ˈspɔrtlʏst ˈsɛsəɱˌveːrtəx]), is a football club based in Woerden, Netherlands. It currently plays in the Derde Divisie, the fourth tier of Dutch football. Formed on 5 October 1946, Sportlust has spent its entire existence in the amateur tiers, bouncing between the Vierde Klasse and the Derde Divisie – the ninth and the fourth tier, respectively.

The club plays their home games at Sportpark Cromwijck. The club colours, reflected in their crest and kit, are red and white.

== History ==
After decades in the lower tiers of amateur football, the Sportlust '46 first team made a leap in the Dutch football pyramid after the turn of the century, where they promoted to the Hoofdklasse for the first time in the 2011–12 season.

In 2019, Sportlust '46 won a championship in the Saturday Eerste Klasse, and promoted to the Hoofdklasse. In 2020, the club won promotion to the fourth-tier Derde Divisie, their second successive promotion, after leading their group at the onset of the COVID-19 pandemic. This was made possible due to the enlargement of the Derde Divisie to 36 teams.

In the 2021–22 Derde Divisie season, Sportlust '46 qualified for the promotion playoffs, but they were eliminated after a 4–1 second leg loss to Kozakken Boys in the first round.

=== Managers ===
- (Netherlands) Ruud Bos (1979–1986)
- (Netherlands) Peter van Boeijen (1994–1996)
- (Netherlands) Jan van den Heuvel (1998–2001)
- (Netherlands) Robbert de Ruiter (2001–1903)
- (Netherlands) Wim Berckenkamp (2003–1904)
- (Netherlands) Jan van den Heuvel (2004–2007)
- (Netherlands) Koos van Zoest (2007–2010)
- (Netherlands) Carl Flux (2010–2011)
- (Netherlands) Cesco Agterberg (2011–2012)
- (Netherlands) Richard Middelkoop (2012–2015)
- (Netherlands) Dennis Sluijk (2015-2016)
- (Netherlands) Wim van 't Westeinde (2016–2018)
- (Netherlands) Patrick Loenen (2018–2022)
- (Netherlands) Jochem Twisler (2022-2024)
- (Netherlands) Willem Romp (2024–)

== Current squad ==
As of 16 March 2024

== Huidige selectie (seizoen 2025–26) ==
Note: Flags indicate national team as defined under FIFA eligibility rules; some limited exceptions apply. Players may hold more than one non-FIFA nationality.

No.	Pos.	Nation	Player
1	GK	NED	Stilanos Damkalis
2	GK	NED	Rafael de Heij
3	GK	NED	Dean Hogervorst
4	GK	NED	Daan Lekkerkerker

No.	Pos.	Nation	Player
5	DF	NED	Nadir Achahbar
6	DF	NED	Yuval Checkley
7	DF	NED	Fabio Helderton
8	DF	NED	Noël Hendriks
9	DF	NED	Coen van der Hoek
10	DF	NED	Kjeld van der Hoek
11	DF	NED	Jayden Mendes Delgado
12	DF	NED	Sanny Monteiro

No.	Pos.	Nation	Player
13	MF	NED	Twan van Aart
14	MF	NED	Luc Dielhof
15	MF	NED	Max Fichtinger
16	MF	NED	Christiaan van Hussen
17	MF	NED	Timo Lutters
18	MF	NED	Barry Rog
19	MF	NED	Mitchell van der Veer

No.	Pos.	Nation	Player
20	FW	NED	Thierry Anthony
21	FW	NED	Jeffrey Buitenweg
22	FW	NED	Kesly den Haag
23	FW	NED	Max Hudepohl
24	FW	NED	Lars van Huisstede
25	FW	NED	Wessel Meiring
26	FW	NED	Mike de Niet
27	FW	NED	Nordin Zoufri
