= 2022–23 in Dutch football =

Football in the Netherlands
- Season: 2022–23

Men's football
- Eredivisie: Feyenoord
- Eerste Divisie: Heracles Almelo
- KNVB Cup: PSV
- Johan Cruyff Shield: PSV

The 2022–23 season is the 133rd season of competitive football in the Netherlands.

== League season ==
=== Eredivisie ===
Pos	Team	Pld	W	D	L	GF	GA	GD	Pts	Qualification or relegation
1	Feyenoord (C)	34	25	7	2	81	30	+51	82	Qualification to Champions league group stage
2	PSV Eindhoven	34	23	6	5	89	40	+49	75	Qualification to Champions League third qualifying round
3	Ajax	34	20	9	5	86	38	+48	69	Qualification to Europa League play-off round
4	AZ	34	20	7	7	68	35	+33	67	Qualification to Europa Conference League third qualifying round
5	Twente (O)	34	18	10	6	66	27	+39	64	Qualification to European competition play-offs
6	Sparta Rotterdam	34	17	8	9	60	37	+23	59	Qualification to European competition play-offs
7	Utrecht	34	15	9	10	55	50	+5	54	Qualification to European competition play-offs
8	Heerenveen	34	12	10	12	44	50	−6	46	Qualification to European competition play-offs
9	RKC Waalwijk	34	11	8	15	50	64	−14	41	
10	Vitesse	34	10	10	14	45	50	−5	40	
11	Go Ahead Eagles	34	10	10	14	46	56	−10	40	
12	NEC	34	8	15	11	42	45	−3	39	
13	Fortuna Sittard	34	10	6	18	39	62	−23	36	
14	Volendam	34	10	6	18	42	71	−29	36	
15	Excelsior	34	9	5	20	32	71	−39	32	
16	Emmen (R)	34	6	10	18	33	65	−32	28	Qualification to Relegation play-offs
17	Cambuur (R)	34	5	4	25	26	69	−43	19	Relegation to Eerste Divisie
18	Groningen (R)	34	4	6	24	31	75	−44	18	Relegation to Eerste Divisie

Source: Eredivisie
Rules for classification: Season in progress: 1) Most points won; 2) Less points lost; 3) Goal difference; 4) Goals scored; 5) Alphabetical order; End of season: 1) Points; 2) Goal difference; 3) Goals scored; 4) Head-to-head points; 5) Head-to-head goal difference; 6) Head-to-head away goals scored; 7) Play-off if relevant for deciding champion, relegation or participating in a European league, otherwise by draw. 8) Penalty shoot-out (only after a play-off)
(C) Champions; (O) Play-off Winner; (R) Relegated

=== Eerste Divisie ===
Pos	Team	Pld	W	D	L	GF	GA	GD	Pts	Promotion or qualification
1	Heracles Almelo (Note: Winner of the First and Fourth Period (Rounds 1–10 and 29–38)) (C, P)	38	27	4	7	103	42	+61	85	Promotion to the Eredivisie
2	PEC Zwolle (Note: Winner of the Second Period (Rounds 11–19)) (P)	38	27	4	7	99	43	+56	85	Promotion to the Eredivisie
3	Almere City (Note: Winner of the Third Period (Rounds 20–28)) (O, P)	38	21	7	10	58	41	+17	70	Qualification for promotion play-offs
4	Willem II	38	19	11	8	68	40	+28	68	Qualification for promotion play-offs
5	MVV Maastricht	38	18	5	15	65	65	0	59	Qualification for promotion play-offs
6	NAC Breda	38	18	5	15	64	64	0	59	Qualification for promotion play-offs
7	VVV-Venlo	38	16	10	12	56	51	+5	58	Qualification for promotion play-offs
8	Eindhoven	38	16	10	12	58	54	+4	58	Qualification for promotion play-offs
9	Telstar	38	14	11	13	39	52	−13	53	
10	De Graafschap	38	15	7	16	64	54	+10	52	
11	Jong AZ	38	14	9	15	60	58	+2	51	Reserve teams are not eligible to be promoted to the Eredivisie
12	ADO Den Haag	38	13	12	13	51	57	−6	51	
13	Jong Ajax	38	12	10	16	69	72	−3	46	Reserve teams are not eligible to be promoted to the Eredivisie
14	Jong PSV	38	12	9	17	59	63	−4	45	Reserve teams are not eligible to be promoted to the Eredivisie
15	Roda JC Kerkrade	38	12	7	19	49	59	−10	43	
16	Helmond Sport	38	11	10	17	39	57	−18	43	
17	TOP Oss	38	10	7	21	45	76	−31	37	
18	Dordrecht	38	9	8	21	41	68	−27	35	
19	Den Bosch	38	10	5	23	46	85	−39	35	
20	Jong FC Utrecht	38	7	7	24	33	65	−32	28	Reserve teams are not eligible to be promoted to the Eredivisie

Source: Soccerway, Keuken Kampioen Divisie (in Dutch)
Rules for classification: Season in progress: 1) Most points won; 2) Less points lost; 3) Goal difference; 4) Goals scored; 5) Alphabetical order; End of season: 1) Points; 2) Goal difference; 3) Goals scored; 4) Head-to-head points; 5) Head-to-head goal difference; 6) Head-to-head away goals scored; 7) Play-off if relevant for deciding champion, relegation or participating in a European league, otherwise by draw. 8) Penalty shoot-out (only after a play-off)
(C) Champions; (O) Play-off winners; (P) Promoted

=== Tweede Divisie ===
Pos	Team	Pld	W	D	L	GF	GA	GD	Pts	Qualification or relegation
1	Katwijk (C)	34	22	5	7	74	36	+38	71	
2	Rijnsburgse Boys	34	21	6	7	73	42	+31	69	
3	AFC	34	20	9	5	60	31	+29	69	
4	HHC Hardenberg	34	18	6	10	75	48	+27	60	
5	De Treffers	34	18	6	10	66	45	+21	60	
6	Quick Boys	34	17	5	12	72	48	+24	56	
7	Koninklijke HFC	34	16	7	11	52	41	+11	55	
8	Scheveningen	34	12	9	13	38	46	−8	45	
9	Noordwijk	34	12	7	15	45	45	0	43	
10	Jong Sparta	34	12	7	15	58	61	−3	43	
11	Spakenburg	34	11	10	13	50	55	−5	43	
12	Lisse	34	10	12	12	45	51	−6	42	
13	Kozakken Boys	34	12	4	18	50	58	−8	40	
14	Excelsior Maassluis	34	10	9	15	50	69	−19	39	
15	TEC (R)	34	10	9	15	41	60	−19	39	Qualification for relegation play-offs
16	IJsselmeervogels (R)	34	9	6	19	51	71	−20	33	Qualification for relegation play-offs
17	Jong Volendam (R)	34	7	5	22	45	82	−37	26	Relegation to Under-21 division
18	OFC (R)	34	4	8	22	33	89	−56	20	Withdrawn

Source: Flashscore
Rules for classification: Season in progress: 1) Most points won; 2) Less points lost; 3) Goal difference; 4) Goals scored; 5) Alphabetical order; End of season: 1) Points; 2) Goal difference; 3) Goals scored; 4) Head-to-head points; 5) Head-to-head goal difference; 6) Head-to-head away goals scored; 7) Play-off if relevant for deciding champion, relegation or participating in a European league, otherwise by draw. 8) Penalty shoot-out (only after a play-off)
(C) Champions; (R) Relegated

=== Derde Divisie ===
==== Saturday League ====
Pos	Team	Pld	W	D	L	GF	GA	GD	Pts	Promotion, qualification or relegation
1	ACV (Note: Winner of the Second and Third Period (Rounds 13–23 and 24–34)) (C, P)	34	22	9	3	71	33	+38	75	Promotion to Tweede Divisie
2	GVVV (O, P)	34	21	6	7	77	40	+37	69	Qualification for promotion play-offs
3	SteDoCo	34	18	4	12	59	42	+17	58	Qualification for promotion play-offs
4	Rijnvogels	34	17	5	12	64	55	+9	56	
5	Barendrecht	34	18	5	11	71	54	+17	55 (Note: Barendrecht were deducted 4 points for losing on purpose in order to qualify for the promotion play-offs)	
6	Sportlust '46	34	15	8	11	52	50	+2	53	
7	DVS '33	34	15	7	12	54	43	+11	52	
8	Sparta Nijkerk	34	13	11	10	45	45	0	50	
9	Hoek	34	16	2	16	71	72	−1	50	
10	DOVO (Note: Winner of the First Period (Rounds 1–12))	34	15	3	16	51	56	−5	48	Qualification for promotion play-offs
11	Staphorst	34	12	9	13	38	41	−3	45	
12	Urk	34	13	3	18	62	76	−14	42	
13	Harkemase Boys	34	10	8	16	52	56	−4	38	
14	RKAV Volendam	34	9	9	16	52	72	−20	36	
15	VVOG (R)	34	10	5	19	49	71	−22	35	Qualification for relegation play-offs
16	Excelsior '31 (R)	34	8	9	17	47	58	−11	33	Qualification for relegation play-offs
17	Ter Leede (R)	34	8	9	17	50	65	−15	33	Relegation to Vierde Divisie
18	ASWH (R)	34	7	6	21	25	61	−36	27	Relegation to Vierde Divisie

Source: Flashsore
Rules for classification: Season in progress: 1) Most points won; 2) Less points lost; 3) Goal difference; 4) Goals scored; 5) Alphabetical order; End of season: 1) Points; 2) Goal difference; 3) Goals scored; 4) Head-to-head points; 5) Head-to-head goal difference; 6) Head-to-head away goals scored; 7) Play-off if relevant for deciding champion, relegation or participating in a European league, otherwise by draw. 8) Penalty shoot-out (only after a play-off)
(C) Champions; (O) Play-off winners; (P) Promoted; (R) Relegated

==== Sunday League ====
Pos	Team	Pld	W	D	L	GF	GA	GD	Pts	Promotion, qualification or relegation
1	ADO '20 (Note: Winner of the First and Third Period (Rounds 1–12 and 24–34)) (C, P)	34	27	3	4	85	34	+51	84	Promotion to Tweede Divisie
2	VVSB (Note: Winner of the Second Period (Rounds 13–23))	34	22	5	7	87	52	+35	71	Qualification for promotion play-offs
3	Hercules	34	18	9	7	61	33	+28	63	Qualification for promotion play-offs
4	Blauw Geel '38	34	15	10	9	53	45	+8	55	
5	OJC	34	16	6	12	58	56	+2	54	
6	HSC '21	34	14	9	11	64	42	+22	51	
7	UNA	34	12	13	9	55	41	+14	49	
8	TOGB	34	13	10	11	68	56	+12	49	
9	Quick (H)	34	13	10	11	59	47	+12	49	
10	DEM	34	13	9	12	58	53	+5	48	
11	Gemert	34	14	5	15	52	59	−7	47	
12	Unitas	34	13	6	15	43	59	−16	45	
13	Groene Ster	34	10	13	11	42	44	−2	43	Qualification for promotion play-offs
14	OSS '20	34	8	12	14	39	59	−20	36	
15	JOS Watergraafsmeer (R)	34	8	8	18	35	80	−45	32	Qualification for relegation play-offs
16	Baronie (O)	34	8	4	22	44	70	−26	28	Qualification for relegation play-offs
17	Dongen (R)	34	6	7	21	45	77	−32	25	Relegation to Vierde Divisie
18	UDI '19 (R)	34	4	5	25	26	67	−41	17	Relegation to Vierde Divisie

Source: Flashscore
Rules for classification: Season in progress: 1) Most points won; 2) Less points lost; 3) Goal difference; 4) Goals scored; 5) Alphabetical order; End of season: 1) Points; 2) Goal difference; 3) Goals scored; 4) Head-to-head points; 5) Head-to-head goal difference; 6) Head-to-head away goals scored; 7) Play-off if relevant for deciding champion, relegation or participating in a European league, otherwise by draw. 8) Penalty shoot-out (only after a play-off)
(C) Champions; (O) Play-off winners; (P) Promoted; (R) Relegated

=== Vierde Divisie ===
==== Saturday A League ====
Pos	Team	Pld	W	D	L	GF	GA	GD	Pts	Promotion, qualification or relegation
1	Kloetinge (C, P)	30	19	5	6	60	38	+22	62	Promotion to Derde Divisie
2	Capelle (Note: Winner of the Second and Third Period (Rounds 11–20 and 21–30))	30	17	6	7	56	38	+18	57	Qualification for promotion play-offs
3	Smitshoek	30	17	6	7	57	41	+16	57	Qualification for promotion play-offs
4	GOES	30	15	9	6	64	41	+23	54	
5	ARC	30	15	6	9	65	50	+15	51	
6	Nieuwenhoorn	30	16	3	11	58	56	+2	51	
7	Poortugaal	30	13	10	7	55	42	+13	49	
8	ODIN '59 (Note: Winner of the First Period (Rounds 1–10)) (O, P)	30	13	5	12	73	58	+15	44	Qualification for promotion play-offs
9	's-Gravenzande	30	13	4	13	62	52	+10	43	
10	Zwaluwen	30	8	12	10	33	36	−3	36	
11	Achilles Veen	30	9	9	12	35	51	−16	36	
12	Feyenoord	30	8	10	12	37	47	−10	34	
13	Spijkenisse (R)	30	9	5	16	51	38	+13	32	Qualification for relegation play-offs
14	WNC (R)	30	9	4	17	38	63	−25	31	Qualification for relegation play-offs
15	Jodan Boys (R)	30	7	6	17	38	61	−23	27	Relegation to Eerste Klasse
16	De Dijk (R)	30	1	2	27	17	87	−70	5	Relegation to Eerste Klasse

Source: Hollandsevelden
Rules for classification: Season in progress: 1) Most points won; 2) Less points lost; 3) Goal difference; 4) Goals scored; 5) Alphabetical order; End of season: 1) Points; 2) Goal difference; 3) Goals scored; 4) Head-to-head points; 5) Head-to-head goal difference; 6) Head-to-head away goals scored; 7) Play-off if relevant for deciding champion, relegation or participating in a European league, otherwise by draw. 8) Penalty shoot-out (only after a play-off)
(C) Champions; (O) Play-off winners; (P) Promoted; (R) Relegated

==== Saturday B League ====
Pos	Team	Pld	W	D	L	GF	GA	GD	Pts	Promotion, qualification or relegation
1	Eemdijk (Note: Winner of the First Period (Rounds 1–10)) (C, P)	30	21	3	6	83	39	+44	66	Promotion to Derde Divisie
2	Swift (Note: Winner of the Third Period (Rounds 21–30))	30	17	6	7	58	39	+19	57	Qualification for promotion play-offs
3	Genemuiden (Note: Winner of the Second Period (Rounds 11–20)) (O, P)	30	15	9	6	57	41	+16	54	Qualification for promotion play-offs
4	AZSV	30	14	6	10	49	38	+11	48	Qualification for promotion play-offs
5	DETO	30	13	8	9	60	44	+16	47	
6	Huizen	30	12	7	11	59	45	+14	43	
7	WV-HEDW	30	12	7	11	52	55	−3	43	
8	Berkum	30	11	8	11	45	37	+8	41	
9	Ajax	30	10	11	9	41	37	+4	41	
10	DHSC	30	13	4	13	53	58	−5	40 (Note: DHSC were deducted 3 points for being involved in a mass brawl after the match against Buitenpost on 22 April 2023)	
11	SDV	30	10	7	13	40	47	−7	37	
12	Buitenpost	30	9	6	15	28	54	−26	32 (Note: Buitenpost were deducted 1 point for being involved in a mass brawl after the match against DHSC on 22 April 2023)	
13	Flevo Boys (R)	30	8	6	16	41	59	−18	30	Qualification for relegation play-offs
14	Apeldoorn (R)	30	7	9	14	36	58	−22	30	Qualification for relegation play-offs
15	Olde Veste (R)	30	8	5	17	38	61	−23	29	Relegation to Eerste Klasse
16	HZVV (R)	30	6	6	18	31	59	−28	24	Relegation to Eerste Klasse

Source: Hollandsevelden
Rules for classification: Season in progress: 1) Most points won; 2) Less points lost; 3) Goal difference; 4) Goals scored; 5) Alphabetical order; End of season: 1) Points; 2) Goal difference; 3) Goals scored; 4) Head-to-head points; 5) Head-to-head goal difference; 6) Head-to-head away goals scored; 7) Play-off if relevant for deciding champion, relegation or participating in a European league, otherwise by draw. 8) Penalty shoot-out (only after a play-off)
(C) Champions; (O) Play-off winners; (P) Promoted; (R) Relegated

==== Sunday A League ====
Pos	Team	Pld	W	D	L	GF	GA	GD	Pts	Promotion, qualification or relegation
1	Hoogeveen (Note: Winner of the Second Period (Rounds 11–20)) (C, P)	30	18	8	4	75	34	+41	62	Promotion to Derde Divisie
2	RKAVV	30	18	7	5	48	21	+27	61	Qualification for promotion play-offs
3	Purmersteijn	30	18	6	6	65	35	+30	60	
4	HBS (Note: Winner of the First Period (Rounds 1–10))	30	16	8	6	66	41	+25	56	Qualification for promotion play-offs
5	Be Quick (Note: Winner of the Third Period (Rounds 21–30))	30	15	10	5	55	25	+30	55	Qualification for promotion play-offs
6	SJC	30	15	5	10	63	59	+4	50	
7	ROHDA	30	15	4	11	61	50	+11	49	
8	Westlandia	30	14	6	10	57	56	+1	48	
9	Hollandia	30	12	10	8	62	43	+19	46	
10	Heino	30	11	4	15	43	40	+3	37	
11	Alphense Boys	30	10	5	15	49	68	−19	35	
12	VOC	30	8	9	13	50	59	−9	33	
13	De Zouaven (R)	30	7	6	17	46	71	−25	27	Qualification for relegation play-offs
14	Velsen (R)	30	6	4	20	39	71	−32	22	Qualification for relegation play-offs
15	Alcides (R)	30	4	3	23	28	82	−54	15	Relegation to Eerste Klasse
16	VKW (R)	30	3	5	22	21	73	−52	14	Relegation to Eerste Klasse

Source: Hollandsevelden
Rules for classification: Season in progress: 1) Most points won; 2) Less points lost; 3) Goal difference; 4) Goals scored; 5) Alphabetical order; End of season: 1) Points; 2) Goal difference; 3) Goals scored; 4) Head-to-head points; 5) Head-to-head goal difference; 6) Head-to-head away goals scored; 7) Play-off if relevant for deciding champion, relegation or participating in a European league, otherwise by draw. 8) Penalty shoot-out (only after a play-off)
(C) Champions; (P) Promoted; (R) Relegated

==== Sunday B League ====
Pos	Team	Pld	W	D	L	GF	GA	GD	Pts	Promotion, qualification or relegation
1	Meerssen (Note: Winner of the Third Period (Rounds 21–30)) (C, P)	30	21	6	3	61	26	+35	69	Promotion to Derde Divisie
2	Kampong (O, P)	30	16	6	8	56	27	+29	54	Qualification for promotion play-offs
3	Juliana '31 (Note: Winner of the Second Period (Rounds 11–20))	30	15	5	10	64	44	+20	50	Qualification for promotion play-offs
4	Hoogland	30	13	9	8	55	49	+6	48	
5	Longa '30	30	14	5	11	49	35	+14	47	
6	Venray	30	13	7	10	64	58	+6	46	
7	Halsteren	30	12	9	9	50	40	+10	45	
8	Nuenen	30	13	6	11	40	36	+4	45	
9	AWC (Note: Winner of the First Period (Rounds 1–10)) (O, P)	30	13	6	11	51	55	−4	45	Qualification for promotion play-offs
10	Orion	30	13	5	12	49	52	−3	44	
11	HVCH	30	13	5	12	47	50	−3	44	
12	Unitas '30	30	12	3	15	50	57	−7	39	
13	EVV (O)	30	10	7	13	38	40	−2	37	Qualification for relegation play-offs
14	Silvolde (R)	30	6	8	16	31	50	−19	26	Qualification for relegation play-offs
15	Moerse Boys (R)	30	7	3	20	47	72	−25	24	Relegation to Eerste Klasse
16	RKZVC (R)	30	2	4	24	24	85	−61	10	Relegation to Eerste Klasse

Source: Hollandsevelden
Rules for classification: Season in progress: 1) Most points won; 2) Less points lost; 3) Goal difference; 4) Goals scored; 5) Alphabetical order; End of season: 1) Points; 2) Goal difference; 3) Goals scored; 4) Head-to-head points; 5) Head-to-head goal difference; 6) Head-to-head away goals scored; 7) Play-off if relevant for deciding champion, relegation or participating in a European league, otherwise by draw. 8) Penalty shoot-out (only after a play-off)
(C) Champions; (O) Play-off winners; (P) Promoted; (R) Relegated

=== Eredivisie (women) ===
Pos	Team	Pld	W	D	L	GF	GA	GD	Pts	Qualification
1	Ajax (C)	20	18	1	1	67	15	+52	55	UEFA Champions League first qualifying round
2	Twente	20	18	0	2	81	6	+75	54	UEFA Champions League first qualifying round
3	Fortuna Sittard	20	11	3	6	49	27	+22	36	
4	PSV	20	11	2	7	36	23	+13	35	
5	ADO Den Haag	20	10	2	8	42	21	+21	32	
6	PEC Zwolle	20	7	5	8	26	37	−11	26	
7	Feyenoord	20	6	6	8	18	24	−6	24	
8	Heerenveen	20	7	1	12	24	56	−32	22	
9	Alkmaar	20	3	3	14	11	55	−44	12	
10	Telstar	20	3	3	14	18	65	−47	12	
11	Excelsior	20	2	2	16	14	57	−43	8	

Source: Soccerway
Rules for classification: Season in progress: 1) Most points won; 2) Less points lost; 3) Goal difference; 4) Goals scored; 5) Alphabetical order; End of season: 1) Points; 2) Goal difference; 3) Goals scored; 4) Head-to-head points; 5) Head-to-head goal difference; 6) Head-to-head away goals scored; 7) Play-off if relevant for deciding champion otherwise by draw. 8) Penalty shoot-out (only after a play-off)
(C) Champions
