= 2023–24 Vierde Divisie =

Vierde Divisie
- Season: 2023–24

The 2023–24 Vierde Divisie is a Dutch football league season played in four sections. The champions of each Vierde Divisie section will be directly promoted to the Derde Divisie; other teams can get promoted through play-offs.

== Vierde Divisie A ==
Vierde Divisie A
- Season: 2023–24
- Champions: Ajax
- Promoted: Ajax; HBC; Huizen
- Relegated: BOL; WV-HEDW; ARC; Alphense Boys

=== Teams ===
Location of teams in the Vierde Divisie A 2023-24
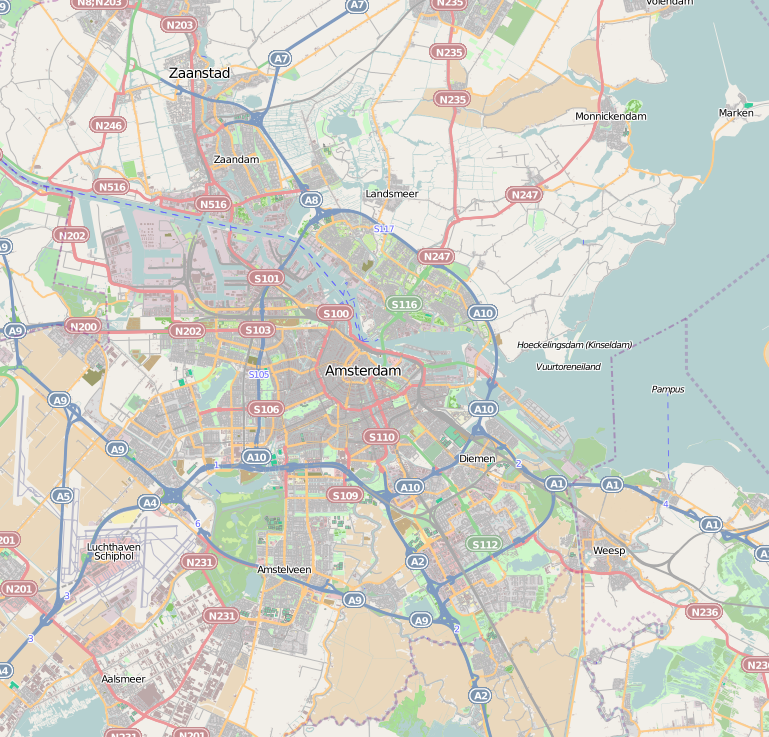
Amsterdam clubs in the Vierde Divisie A 2023-24

Club	Home City
AFC '34	Alkmaar
Ajax	Amsterdam
Alphense Boys	Alphen aan den Rijn
ARC	Alphen aan den Rijn
BOL	Broek op Langedijk
DHSC	Utrecht
HBC	Heemstede
Hollandia	Hoorn
Hoogland	Hoogland
Huizen	Huizen
JOS Watergraafsmeer	Amsterdam
Purmersteijn	Purmerend
SJC	Noordwijk
Swift	Amsterdam
Ter Leede	Sassenheim
WV-HEDW	Amsterdam

=== Number of teams by province ===
Number of teams	Province	Team(s)
10	North Holland	AFC '34, Ajax, BOL, HBC, Hollandia, Huizen, JOS Watergraafsmeer, Purmersteijn, Swift, WV-HEDW
4	South Holland	Alphense Boys, ARC, SJC, Ter Leede
2	Utrecht	DHSC, Hoogland

=== Standings ===
Pos	Team	Pld	W	D	L	GF	GA	GD	Pts	Promotion, qualification or relegation
1	Ajax (Note: Winner of the Second Period (Rounds 11–20)) (C)	30	19	3	8	70	36	+34	60	Promotion to Derde Divisie
2	Huizen (Note: Winner of the Third Period (Rounds 21–30)) (P)	30	18	5	7	55	26	+29	59	promotion play-offs
3	JOS Watergraafsmeer	30	18	3	9	57	39	+18	57	promotion play-offs
4	AFC '34	30	17	3	10	56	39	+17	54	
5	HBC (Note: Winner of the First Period (Rounds 1–10)) (P)	30	15	6	9	76	46	+30	51	promotion play-offs
6	Purmersteijn	30	12	10	8	54	34	+20	46	
7	Hollandia	30	12	8	10	51	43	+8	44	
8	Ter Leede	30	13	2	15	77	62	+15	41	
9	Swift	30	10	8	12	40	47	−7	38	
10	Hoogland	30	11	5	14	43	52	−9	38	
11	DHSC	30	11	4	15	39	72	−33	37	
12	SJC	30	9	8	13	51	68	−17	35	
13	BOL (R)	30	8	9	13	37	61	−24	33	Qualification for relegation play-offs
14	WV-HEDW (R)	30	10	2	18	62	74	−12	32	Qualification for relegation play-offs
15	ARC (R)	30	9	5	16	41	56	−15	32	Relegation to Eerste Klasse
16	Alphense Boys (R)	30	5	5	20	35	89	−54	20	Relegation to Eerste Klasse

Source: Hollandsevelden
Rules for classification: Season in progress: 1) Most points won; 2) Less points lost; 3) Goal difference; 4) Goals scored; 5) Alphabetical order; End of season: 1) Points; 2) Goal difference; 3) Goals scored; 4) Head-to-head points; 5) Head-to-head goal difference; 6) Head-to-head away goals scored; 7) Play-off if relevant for deciding champion, relegation or participating in a European league, otherwise by draw. 8) Penalty shoot-out (only after a play-off)
(C) Champions; (P) Promoted; (R) Relegated

=== Fixtures/results ===
Home \ Away	AFC	AJA	ALP	ARC	BOL	DHS	HBC	HOL	HOO	HUI	JOS	PUR	SJC	SWI	TER	WVH
AFC '34		2–1	6–0	0–1	1–1	3–2	0–4	1–0	0–1	0–1	3–0	1–1	5–1	2–4	2–0	1–3
Ajax	1–2		2–0	3–1	4–0	2–3	1–2	2–2	2–1	2–1	4–1	1–3	4–1	7–2	4–1	3–1
Alphense Boys	0–3	0–2		2–0	1–2	1–2	1–5	1–4	3–1	2–2	0–3	0–4	5–4	0–2	0–5	0–4
ARC	1–2	1–2	1–0		2–0	0–1	1–5	1–1	2–3	2–1	0–1	2–4	0–0	1–0	0–2	6–0
BOL	1–3	2–2	2–2	1–1		2–0	3–2	2–0	2–1	0–0	2–4	2–2	1–2	0–0	2–1	3–2
DHSC	2–0	0–4	4–3	1–1	1–2		0–8	0–1	1–1	2–1	0–2	0–3	5–3	2–1	2–12	2–2
HBC	1–3	0–1	4–0	3–1	2–0	3–0		4–0	3–3	0–0	3–4	2–2	2–0	0–0	6–4	1–2
Hollandia	3–0	2–1	3–0	4–2	3–3	0–0	1–1		2–0	0–1	1–0	0–1	2–2	3–1	2–2	4–2
Hoogland	1–1	0–1	2–2	3–0	5–1	2–1	1–3	1–1		1–0	1–2	2–4	3–0	2–1	3–2	1–0
Huizen	3–1	3–0	1–1	3–1	4–0	0–1	3–2	2–0	5–0		2–0	1–0	1–1	2–0	2–1	5–1
JOS Watergraafsmeer	2–0	1–0	4–1	3–4	4–1	1–0	1–2	2–1	5–2	2–1		1–1	1–2	0–0	3–2	2–0
Purmersteijn	1–2	0–1	4–1	1–1	3–0	1–2	1–1	2–1	3–0	0–1	0–0		2–2	1–1	0–2	2–3
SJC	0–1	1–3	4–4	4–2	2–1	4–1	3–1	1–0	1–0	1–2	1–2	1–1		1–1	2–2	1–4
Swift	0–2	1–1	0–1	1–3	1–1	3–1	2–3	0–1	2–0	3–2	1–0	1–0	2–5		3–2	3–1
Ter Leede	1–5	2–4	6–0	3–0	3–0	2–0	2–0	3–5	1–0	1–2	3–1	2–5	4–1	2–3		2–1
WV-HEDW	2–4	0–3	2–4	2–3	3–0	2–3	6–3	5–4	1–2	1–3	1–4	0–2	6–0	1–1	4–2	

Source: Hollandsevelden
Legend: Blue = home team win; Yellow = draw; Red = away team win.

== Vierde Divisie B ==
Vierde Divisie B
- Season: 2023–24
- Champions: ASWH
- Promoted: ASWH 's-Gravenzande; Smitshoek
- Relegated: Nieuwenhoorn; DSO

=== Teams ===
Clubs in the Saturday Vierde Divisie B 2023-24
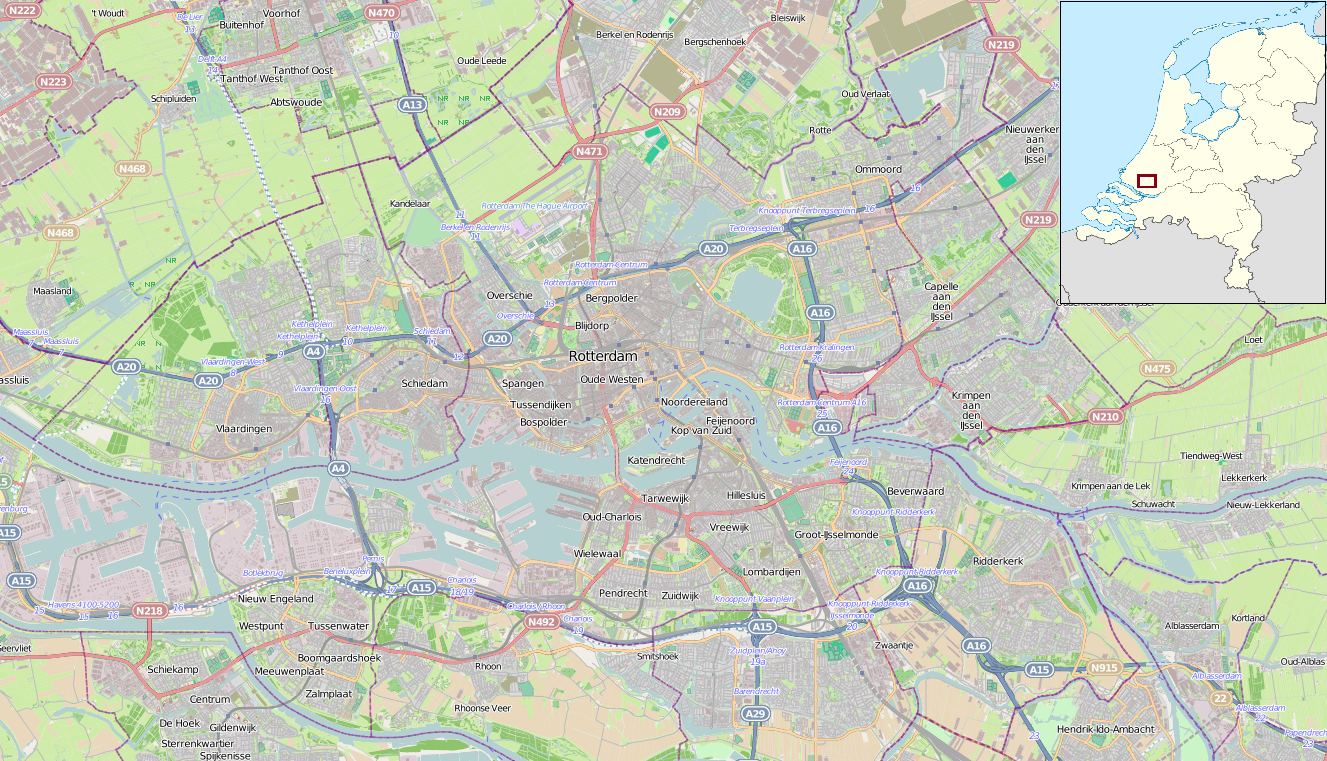
Rotterdam area Vierde Divisie B 2023-24 football clubs

Club	Home City
ASWH	Hendrik-Ido-Ambacht
Capelle	Capelle aan den IJssel
DSO	Zoetermeer
Feyenoord	Rotterdam
's-Gravenzande	's-Gravenzande
HBS	Den Haag
Heerjansdam	Heerjansdam
LRC	Leerdam
Nieuwenhoorn	Hellevoetsluis
Poortugaal	Poortugaal
RKAVV	Leidschendam
RVVH	Ridderkerk
Smitshoek	Barendrecht
VOC	Rotterdam
Westlandia	Naaldwijk
Zwaluwen	Vlaardingen

=== Number of teams by province ===
Number of teams	Province	Team(s)
15	South Holland	ASWH, Capelle, DSO, Feyenoord, 's-Gravenzande, HBS, Heerjansdam, Nieuwenhoorn, Poortugaal, RKAVV, RVVH, Smitshoek, VOC, Westlandia, Zwaluwen
1	Utrecht	LRC

=== Standings ===
Pos	Team	Pld	W	D	L	GF	GA	GD	Pts	Promotion, qualification or relegation
1	ASWH (Note: Winner of the First, Second and Third Period (Rounds 1–10, 11–20 and 21–30)) (C)	30	20	6	4	49	26	+23	66	Promotion to Derde Divisie
2	's-Gravenzande (P)	30	15	7	8	60	48	+12	52	promotion play-offs
3	Capelle	30	14	6	10	44	35	+9	48	
4	Smitshoek (P)	30	13	7	10	44	43	+1	46	promotion play-offs
5	Zwaluwen	30	13	6	11	64	56	+8	45	
6	LRC	30	12	8	10	61	51	+10	44	
7	Westlandia	30	13	5	12	50	44	+6	44	promotion play-offs
8	Poortugaal	30	12	7	11	63	51	+12	43	
9	Feyenoord	30	11	9	10	52	50	+2	42	
10	HBS	30	11	8	11	39	39	0	41	
11	RVVH	30	11	5	14	53	48	+5	38	
12	RKAVV	30	9	11	10	45	43	+2	38	
13	Heerjansdam (O)	30	9	9	12	42	48	−6	36	Qualification for relegation play-offs
14	VOC (O)	30	9	4	17	49	77	−28	31	Qualification for relegation play-offs
15	Nieuwenhoorn (R)	30	9	3	18	44	65	−21	30	Relegation to Eerste Klasse
16	DSO (R)	30	6	5	19	30	65	−35	23	Relegation to Eerste Klasse

Source: Hollandsevelden
Rules for classification: Season in progress: 1) Most points won; 2) Less points lost; 3) Goal difference; 4) Goals scored; 5) Alphabetical order; End of season: 1) Points; 2) Goal difference; 3) Goals scored; 4) Head-to-head points; 5) Head-to-head goal difference; 6) Head-to-head away goals scored; 7) Play-off if relevant for deciding champion, relegation or participating in a European league, otherwise by draw. 8) Penalty shoot-out (only after a play-off)
(C) Champions; (O) Play-off winners; (P) Promoted; (R) Relegated

=== Fixtures/results ===
Home \ Away	ASW	CAP	DSO	FEY	GRA	HBS	HEE	LRC	NIE	POO	RKA	RVV	SMI	VOC	WES	ZWA
ASWH		1–0	1–0	3–2	2–2	0–1	3–2	2–0	2–1	0–0	1–0	4–1	3–1	4–0	0–3	1–0
Capelle	0–0		3–1	0–0	2–1	2–1	0–2	4–3	4–1	1–2	2–0	2–0	2–0	3–2	1–1	2–3
DSO	1–2	0–3		1–1	0–2	2–2	1–0	0–3	2–1	1–4	0–5	1–8	1–0	4–1	0–2	0–0
Feyenoord	0–2	1–1	3–3		1–3	0–1	1–0	4–3	3–1	3–3	1–1	3–2	0–1	1–3	2–3	2–4
's-Gravenzande	4–2	1–1	4–0	1–3		4–0	3–2	1–0	3–2	0–3	0–3	1–1	1–1	2–1	3–0	2–2
HBS	0–1	0–1	1–2	0–1	2–0		0–0	0–1	0–0	3–2	1–2	2–1	4–0	1–1	0–1	2–1
Heerjansdam	0–0	2–0	1–0	2–1	1–2	1–1		1–1	0–2	1–1	1–1	1–0	1–2	3–1	2–2	0–3
LRC	1–1	2–0	3–2	1–1	3–4	2–5	3–3		1–0	1–0	1–1	1–1	2–2	6–1	2–2	4–2
Nieuwenhoorn	1–2	3–0	2–6	2–4	1–4	0–1	5–4	0–3		2–1	3–6	1–0	0–0	4–0	1–0	1–5
Poortugaal	1–3	3–2	2–0	2–2	3–0	1–2	4–1	2–4	2–0		3–1	1–2	1–1	1–3	2–1	3–2
RKAVV	2–2	2–1	0–0	1–1	1–1	0–1	2–3	2–3	0–2	2–2		0–2	1–0	3–3	0–1	1–1
RVVH	2–1	0–1	3–0	4–1	3–3	3–2	2–3	6–3	1–1	2–0	1–2		1–2	3–2	0–3	4–0
Smitshoek	1–2	1–3	2–1	0–4	2–0	1–1	0–3	1–0	3–0	2–2	3–0	3–0		3–3	6–3	2–1
VOC	0–1	1–0	2–1	1–2	4–2	5–2	1–1	1–0	0–2	2–8	2–3	3–0	1–0		1–3	1–9
Westlandia	0–2	1–2	3–0	0–1	0–1	1–1	2–1	0–3	3–2	4–3	1–3	0–0	1–2	2–0		1–3
Zwaluwen	0–1	0–0	1–0	1–3	2–5	2–2	4–0	2–1	5–3	4–3	0–0	1–0	1–2	5–4	0–6	

Source: Hollandsevelden
Legend: Blue = home team win; Yellow = draw; Red = away team win.

== Vierde Divisie C ==
Vierde Divisie C
- Season: 2023–24
- Champions: GOES
- Promoted: GOES
- Relegated: Unitas '30; Kruisland; Nemelaer; HVCH

=== Teams ===
Location of teams in the Vierde Divisie C 2023-24
North Brabant clubs in the Vierde Divisie C 2023-24

Club	Home City
Achilles Veen	Veen
Best Vooruit	Best
Dongen	Dongen
EVV	Echt
GOES	Goes
Halsteren	Halsteren
HVCH	Heesch
Juliana '31	Malden
Kruisland	Kruisland
Nemelaer	Haaren
Nuenen	Nuenen
Orion	Nijmegen
UDI '19	Uden
Unitas '30	Etten-Leur
Venray	Venray
Wittenhorst	Horst

=== Number of teams by province ===
Number of teams	Province	Team(s)
10	North Brabant	Achilles Veen, Best Vooruit, Dongen, Halsteren, HVCH, Kruisland, Nemelaer, Nuenen, UDI '19, Unitas '30
3	Limburg	EVV, Venray, Wittenhorst
2	Gelderland	Juliana '31, Orion
1	Zeeland	GOES

=== Standings ===
Pos	Team	Pld	W	D	L	GF	GA	GD	Pts	Promotion, qualification or relegation
1	GOES (Note: Winner of the First and Third Period (Rounds 1–10 and 21–30)) (C)	30	21	5	4	97	33	+64	68	Promotion to Derde Divisie
2	Achilles Veen	30	16	10	4	64	35	+29	58	promotion play-offs
3	Dongen	30	17	6	7	71	40	+31	57	promotion play-offs
4	UDI '19	30	15	5	10	46	31	+15	50	
5	Nuenen	30	13	7	10	46	43	+3	46	
6	Venray	30	14	4	12	55	55	0	46	
7	EVV	30	14	4	12	44	44	0	46	
8	Halsteren (Note: Winner of the Second Period (Rounds 11–20))	30	12	6	12	52	62	−10	42	promotion play-offs
9	Best Vooruit	30	12	6	12	48	58	−10	42	
10	Orion	30	13	2	15	55	58	−3	41	
11	Wittenhorst	30	10	7	13	55	60	−5	37	
12	Juliana '31	30	9	9	12	56	57	−1	36	
13	Unitas '30 (R)	30	10	4	16	53	75	−22	34	Qualification for relegation play-offs
14	Kruisland (R)	30	5	9	16	38	65	−27	24	Qualification for relegation play-offs
15	Nemelaer (R)	30	5	9	16	37	71	−34	24	Relegation to Eerste Klasse
16	HVCH (R)	30	5	5	20	38	68	−30	20	Relegation to Eerste Klasse

Updated to match(es) played on 18 May 2024. Source: Hollandsevelden
Rules for classification: Season in progress: 1) Most points won; 2) Less points lost; 3) Goal difference; 4) Goals scored; 5) Alphabetical order; End of season: 1) Points; 2) Goal difference; 3) Goals scored; 4) Head-to-head points; 5) Head-to-head goal difference; 6) Head-to-head away goals scored; 7) Play-off if relevant for deciding champion, relegation or participating in a European league, otherwise by draw. 8) Penalty shoot-out (only after a play-off)
(C) Champions; (R) Relegated

=== Fixtures/results ===
Home \ Away	ACH	BES	DON	EVV	GOE	HAL	HVC	JUL	KRU	NEM	NUE	ORI	UDI	UNI	VEN	WIT
Achilles Veen		2–2	2–2	3–0	2–1	2–3	0–0	2–1	6–1	3–3	0–2	1–0	2–0	0–0	8–0	0–1
Best Vooruit	1–4		1–0	1–0	0–3	0–1	4–1	2–0	2–0	2–2	1–1	3–1	1–1	5–0	1–1	3–2
Dongen	2–0	3–1		6–0	1–1	4–2	3–0	3–3	2–0	2–3	0–1	4–2	1–0	7–1	1–3	2–1
EVV	1–2	6–0	0–0		0–4	1–0	2–1	2–1	1–0	0–0	2–2	3–0	2–0	3–2	1–0	0–3
GOES	3–4	5–1	4–1	3–0		2–2	0–0	3–1	4–1	3–1	4–1	5–1	2–0	6–0	3–0	2–2
Halsteren	2–2	2–3	0–2	4–2	0–5		2–1	1–1	2–0	3–1	0–1	2–2	3–2	2–0	1–3	5–2
HVCH	1–2	2–3	2–2	3–6	2–5	1–3		2–2	2–1	2–0	0–3	0–1	1–1	1–3	2–4	1–2
Juliana '31	4–4	2–0	2–1	1–0	2–3	2–2	1–3		3–3	5–1	5–2	1–2	1–2	3–5	1–0	1–1
Kruisland	1–1	3–4	3–5	1–1	0–3	4–1	2–1	0–1		0–2	1–2	1–1	1–0	1–3	1–1	4–4
Nemelaer	0–3	1–2	1–6	0–2	0–5	3–4	3–1	2–2	1–1		2–1	0–3	0–0	1–3	2–4	3–2
Nuenen	1–1	2–1	2–3	1–0	1–1	0–0	1–2	3–1	1–2	1–1		1–2	2–1	2–2	0–1	5–0
Orion	1–2	2–0	2–3	1–2	1–4	2–1	3–4	3–1	1–3	3–0	1–3		2–1	2–0	3–1	3–1
UDI '19	1–1	3–1	1–0	2–0	3–2	2–0	2–1	3–1	3–0	2–0	0–1	2–1		2–0	1–1	1–0
Unitas '30	1–2	4–2	1–2	0–2	2–4	6–0	3–1	1–1	5–1	0–0	2–0	6–5	0–4		1–3	1–3
Venray	0–1	3–0	0–2	3–1	4–3	4–1	2–0	0–4	1–1	4–2	1–3	2–1	0–3	7–0		2–4
Wittenhorst	0–2	1–1	1–1	0–4	0–4	2–3	2–0	1–2	1–1	2–2	6–0	1–3	4–3	3–1	3–0	

Source: Hollandsevelden
Legend: Blue = home team win; Yellow = draw; Red = away team win.

== Vierde Divisie D ==
Vierde Divisie D
- Season: 2023–24
- Champions: Excelsior '31
- Promoted: Excelsior '31; ROHDA
- Relegated: Buitenpost; Longa '30; Be Quick; Pelikaan-S

=== Teams ===
Location of teams in the Vierde Divisie D 2023-24
Overijssel clubs in the Vierde Divisie D 2023-24

Club	Home City
AZSV	Aalten
Be Quick	Haren
Berkum	Zwolle
Buitenpost	Buitenpost
DETO	Vriezenveen
Excelsior '31	Rijssen
Heino	Heino
Longa '30	Lichtenvoorde
MASV	Arnhem
Pelikaan-S	Oostwold
Quick '20	Oldenzaal
ROHDA	Raalte
Scherpenzeel	Scherpenzeel
SDV	Barneveld
TVC '28	Tubbergen
VVOG	Harderwijk

=== Number of teams by province ===
Number of teams	Province	Team(s)
7	Overijssel	Berkum, DETO, Excelsior '31, Heino, Quick '20, ROHDA, TVC '28
6	Gelderland	AZSV, Longa '30, MASV, Scherpenzeel, SDV, VVOG
2	Groningen	Be Quick, Pelikaan-S
1	Friesland	Buitenpost

=== Standings ===
Pos	Team	Pld	W	D	L	GF	GA	GD	Pts	Promotion, qualification or relegation
1	Excelsior '31 (Note: Winner of the First, Second and Third Period (Rounds 1–10, 11–20 and 21–30)) (C)	30	20	8	2	79	34	+45	68	Promotion to Derde Divisie
2	Scherpenzeel	30	17	9	4	63	37	+26	60	promotion play-offs
3	ROHDA (P)	30	19	3	8	72	47	+25	60	promotion play-offs
4	VVOG	30	16	2	12	70	45	+25	50	
5	AZSV	30	13	9	8	45	33	+12	48	promotion play-offs
6	Berkum	30	12	11	7	45	36	+9	47	
7	SDV	30	11	7	12	37	35	+2	40	
8	MASV	30	12	4	14	42	56	−14	40	
9	Quick '20	30	10	8	12	45	48	−3	38	
10	DETO	30	9	10	11	49	44	+5	37	
11	Heino	30	8	10	12	44	50	−6	34	
12	TVC '28	30	10	4	16	52	68	−16	34	
13	Buitenpost (R)	30	7	12	11	40	51	−11	33	Qualification for relegation play-offs
14	Longa '30 (R)	30	8	6	16	33	48	−15	30	Qualification for relegation play-offs
15	Be Quick (R)	30	8	5	17	35	64	−29	29	Relegation to Eerste Klasse
16	Pelikaan-S (R)	30	3	6	21	27	82	−55	15	Relegation to Eerste Klasse

Source: Hollandsevelden
Rules for classification: Season in progress: 1) Most points won; 2) Less points lost; 3) Goal difference; 4) Goals scored; 5) Alphabetical order; End of season: 1) Points; 2) Goal difference; 3) Goals scored; 4) Head-to-head points; 5) Head-to-head goal difference; 6) Head-to-head away goals scored; 7) Play-off if relevant for deciding champion, relegation or participating in a European league, otherwise by draw. 8) Penalty shoot-out (only after a play-off)
(C) Champions; (P) Promoted; (R) Relegated

=== Fixtures/results ===
Home \ Away	AZS	BEQ	BER	BUI	DET	EXC	HEI	LON	MAS	PEL	QUI	ROH	SCH	SDV	TVC	VVO
AZSV		1–1	1–0	2–2	2–0	0–2	1–0	0–0	4–1	3–0	1–3	4–0	1–1	1–2	1–1	2–0
Be Quick	0–1		0–0	2–2	0–4	0–0	2–0	1–0	2–0	2–0	3–2	3–4	2–3	0–4	2–6	4–1
Berkum	0–0	0–2		2–2	2–0	0–1	4–0	1–1	1–2	1–0	2–0	1–4	1–1	1–1	3–2	3–2
Buitenpost	1–1	1–2	1–1		2–2	0–2	2–0	0–0	1–1	3–1	0–2	1–2	2–5	1–1	3–2	2–1
DETO	2–2	2–1	0–1	1–2		2–2	1–2	1–1	4–0	3–2	1–2	0–2	2–2	0–0	1–0	2–4
Excelsior '31	2–0	3–1	2–2	5–1	2–2		3–0	4–3	6–3	5–0	3–1	4–1	2–2	2–2	5–2	2–0
Heino	2–2	2–0	1–1	2–0	1–3	1–3		3–2	1–1	5–0	4–2	1–1	0–2	0–2	2–2	1–3
Longa '30	2–3	2–1	0–1	3–0	1–0	0–2	0–0		4–2	2–1	0–1	1–4	0–3	1–0	2–3	1–2
MASV	3–2	1–0	1–3	2–1	1–3	0–3	3–1	4–2		4–0	1–0	1–2	0–0	0–1	1–0	3–4
Pelikaan-S	0–1	1–1	2–1	0–2	0–4	3–3	2–2	1–2	3–2		1–1	0–8	1–1	5–1	0–3	0–5
Quick '20	4–3	7–1	1–2	1–1	1–1	1–3	1–1	1–1	0–0	1–1		2–0	0–3	1–1	2–1	0–6
ROHDA	2–1	2–0	1–1	0–1	4–4	3–2	1–2	1–0	4–1	3–2	2–1		2–3	1–0	6–1	1–4
Scherpenzeel	0–1	3–1	0–3	4–3	1–1	2–0	1–1	3–1	3–0	2–0	2–1	4–2		1–2	2–2	3–2
SDV	0–2	1–0	0–0	0–0	2–0	0–2	0–5	0–1	0–1	2–0	1–2	1–3	1–3		6–0	1–2
TVC '28	2–0	7–1	2–6	2–1	2–1	0–2	3–3	1–0	1–2	4–1	0–3	0–3	3–1	0–2		0–5
VVOG	0–2	4–0	6–1	2–2	0–2	2–2	2–1	4–0	0–1	5–0	2–1	1–3	0–2	0–3	1–0	

Source: Hollandsevelden
Legend: Blue = home team win; Yellow = draw; Red = away team win.

== Play-offs ==
=== Derde Divisie promotion/relegation playoffs ===
The teams who finish 15th and 16th in both the Derde Divisie A and B will play relegation playoffs against teams from the Vierde Divisie. The four bracket winners will play in next season's Derde Divisie.

==== Derde Divisie A ====
===== Bracket 1 =====
Semifinals
Staphorst	2	2	4
JOS Watergraafsmeer (a.e.t.)	1	4	5
Scherpenzeel	0	2	2
HBC (p)	0	2	2

Final
JOS Watergraafsmeer	1	0	1
HBC	2	2	4

==== Semifinals ====
29 May 2024
20:00

JOS Watergraafsmeer	1–2	Staphorst

1 June 2024
14:30

Staphorst	2–4 (a.e.t.)	JOS Watergraafsmeer

JOS Watergraafsmeer won 5–4 on aggregate.

29 May 2024

HBC	0–0	Scherpenzeel

1 June 2024

Scherpenzeel	2–2 (a.e.t.)	HBC
Penalties
	3–4

2–2 on aggregate. HBC won 4–3 on penalties.

==== Final ====
5 June 2024

HBC	2–1	JOS Watergraafsmeer

8 June 2024

JOS Watergraafsmeer	0–2	HBC

HBC won 4–1 on aggregate.

===== Bracket 2 =====
Semifinals
Huizen	1	1	2
AZSV	0	1	1
Hoogeveen	3	0	3
ROHDA	1	3	4

Final
Huizen	1	0	1
ROHDA	0	0	0

==== Semifinals ====
29 May 2024

ROHDA	1–3	Hoogeveen

1 June 2024

Hoogeveen	0–3	ROHDA

ROHDA won 4–3 on aggregate.

29 May 2024

AZSV	0–1	Huizen

1 June 2024

Huizen	1–1	AZSV

Huizen won 2–1 on aggregate.

==== Final ====
5 June 2024

ROHDA	0–1	Huizen

8 June 2024

Huizen	0–0	ROHDA

Huizen won 1–0 on aggregate.

==== Derde Divisie B ====
===== Bracket 1 =====
Semifinals
Achilles Veen	3	2	5
Westlandia	0	0	0
AWC	1	0	1
Smitshoek	1	2	3

Final
Achilles Veen	0	0	0
Smitshoek	1	1	2

==== Semifinals ====
29 May 2024

Smitshoek	1–1	AWC

1 June 2024

AWC	0–2	Smitshoek

AWC won 3–1 on aggregate.

29 May 2024

Westlandia	0–3	Achilles Veen

1 June 2024

Achilles Veen	2–0	Westlandia

Achilles Veen won 5–0 on aggregate.

==== Final ====
5 June 2024

Smitshoek	1–0	Achilles Veen

8 June 2024

Achilles Veen	0–1	Smitshoek

Smitshoek won 2–0 on aggregate.

===== Bracket 2 =====
Semifinals
's-Gravenzande	3	2	5
Halsteren	2	0	2
Unitas (p)	1	1	2
Dongen	1	1	2

Final
's-Gravenzande	2	1	3
Unitas	2	0	2

==== Semifinals ====
29 May 2024

Dongen	1–1	Unitas

1 June 2024

Unitas	1–1 (a.e.t.)	Dongen
Penalties
	4–2

2–2 on aggregate. Unitas won 4–2 on penalties

29 May 2024

Halsteren	2–3	's-Gravenzande

1 June 2024

's-Gravenzande	2–0	Halsteren

's-Gravenzande won 5–2 on aggregate.

==== Final ====
5 June 2024

Unitas	2–2	's-Gravenzande

8 June 2024

's-Gravenzande	1–0	Unitas

's-Gravenzande won 3–2 on aggregate.

==== "Second chance" promotion play-off ====
Due to the withdrawal of OSS '20 from the Derde Divisie, the four losing promotion finalists will compete for one last spot in next season's Derde Divisie. The final will be played at a neutral site.

===== Bracket =====
Semifinal
ROHDA	2
Achilles Veen	1
JOS Watergraafsmeer	2
Unitas	3

Final
ROHDA	4
Unitas	0

==== Semifinals ====
12 June 2024
20:00

ROHDA	2–1	Achilles Veen

12 June 2024
20:00

JOS Watergraafsmeer	2–3	Unitas

==== Final ====
15 June 2024
15:00

ROHDA	4–0	Unitas
