= Ilano Silva Timas =

Cape Verdean footballer (born 2002)

Personal information
- Date of birth: 29 September 2002 (age 24)
- Place of birth: Rotterdam, Netherlands
- Height: 1.83 m (6 ft 0 in)
- Positions: Winger; attacking midfielder

Team information
- Current team: Excelsior
- Number: 21

Youth career
- Feyenoord
- –2016: Sparta Rotterdam
- 2016–2022: Excelsior Maassluis

Senior career*
Years	Team	Apps	(Gls)
2022–2023	Excelsior Maassluis	12	(0)
2023–2024	Smitshoek	29	(8)
2024	Excelsior Maassluis	0	(0)
2024–2026	MVV	69	(10)
2026–	Excelsior	0	(0)

International career^{‡}
2025–	Cape Verde	1	(0)
- * Club domestic league appearances and goals as of 28 April 2026 ‡ National team caps and goals as of 13:45, 30 May 2025 (UTC)

Ilano Silva Timas (Dutch: [i.ˈla.nɔ] Portuguese: [ˈsil.vɐ ˈti.mɐʃ]; born 29 September 2002) is a professional footballer who plays as a winger or attacking midfielder for Eredivisie club Excelsior. Born in the Netherlands, he represents the Cape Verde national team.

== Club career ==
=== Early career ===
Born in Rotterdam, Silva Timas played youth football with Feyenoord and Sparta Rotterdam before joining Excelsior Maassluis at the under-15 level. He made his senior debut for the club on 4 June 2022, starting in a 3–1 away loss to Jong Volendam in the Tweede Divisie. During the following season, he primarily featured as a substitute, making 11 appearances.

=== Smitshoek ===
Ahead of the 2023–24 season, Silva Timas moved to Smitshoek in the Vierde Divisie to gain more experience. He quickly impressed by scoring four goals in his first seven matches and was named Smitshoek Player of the Month for August and September.

On 5 March 2024, he announced his return to Maassluis for the 2024–25 season, signing a one-year contract. In his season at Smitshoek, he played a pivotal role in their promotion to the Derde Divisie, scoring a decisive goal in the promotion play-offs against Achilles Veen.

=== MVV ===
During the summer of 2024, Silva Timas underwent a successful pre-season trial with MVV in the Eerste Divisie, scoring eight goals in four friendlies. This earned him a two-year professional contract with the club on 24 July 2024. He made his professional debut on 9 August, replacing Rayan Buifrahi in the 62nd minute of a 1–0 home loss to Cambuur on the opening matchday. On 13 October, he netted his first professional goal in a 2–0 win over VVV-Venlo in a Limburg derby. In his first 12 matches, he scored three goals and provided two assists. On 17 December, he scored against his former youth club, Feyenoord, in a 2–1 defeat in the KNVB Cup. On 22 December, he scored his first brace for the club in a convincing 5–1 win over Telstar. He finished his first professional season with six goals in 35 appearances, establishing himself as a key player for MVV.

Ahead of the 2025–26 season, Dutch media reported that Silva Timas had attracted interest from Aberdeen and newly promoted Excelsior, but he ultimately remained with MVV.

=== Excelsior Rotterdam ===
On 15 July 2026, Silva Timas moved to the top-tier Eredivisie and signed with Excelsior for three years.

== International career ==
Born in the Netherlands, Silva Timas is of Cape Verdean descent. In May 2025, Silva Timas was called up to the Cape Verde national team for a set of friendlies. He debuted with Cape Verde in a friendly 1–1 tie with Malaysia on 29 May 2025.

== Style of play ==
Silva Timas is a two-footed midfielder recognised for his composure under pressure, precise passing, and strong tactical awareness. Early in his career, he was compared to Sergio Busquets for his ability to control play, create goal-scoring opportunities, and contribute defensively. Silva Timas is also effective at pressing forward and providing goals and assists. As he progressed in his career, he further developed his goal-scoring instincts and ball control.

== Personal life ==
Before signing his first professional contract with MVV in 2024 at age 21, Silva Timas worked as a grocery deliverer.

== Career statistics ==
=== Club ===
As of match played 19 December 2025

Appearances and goals by club, season and competition
Club	Season	League			KNVB Cup		Other		Total	
Club	Season	Division	Apps	Goals	Apps	Goals	Apps	Goals	Apps	Goals
Excelsior Maassluis	2021–22	Tweede Divisie	1	0	—		—		1	0
Excelsior Maassluis	2022–23	Tweede Divisie	11	0	0	0	—		11	0
Excelsior Maassluis	Total		12	0	0	0	—		12	0
Smitshoek	2023–24	Vierde Divisie	29	8	0	0	4 (Note: Appearances in Derde Divisie promotion/relegation playoffs)	2	33	10
MVV	2024–25	Eerste Divisie	33	5	2	1	—		35	6
MVV	2025–26	Eerste Divisie	19	4	0	0	—		19	4
MVV	Total		52	9	2	1	—		52	10
Career total			93	17	2	1	4	2	99	20
