= 2005–06 KNVB Cup =

Tournament details
- Country: Netherlands
- Teams: 87

Final positions
- Champions: Ajax
- Runners-up: PSV

Tournament statistics
- Top goal scorer: Klaas-Jan Huntelaar (6)

The 2005–06 KNVB Cup was the 88th edition of the Dutch national football annual knockout tournament for the KNVB Cup. 87 teams contested, beginning on 2 August 2005 and ending at the final on 7 May 2006.

Ajax beat PSV 2–1 in the final, winning the trophy for the sixteenth time.

== Teams ==
- All 18 participants of the Eredivisie 2005-06
- All 20 participants of the Eerste Divisie 2005-06
- 47 teams from lower (amateur) leagues
- Two youth teams

== Qualifying round ==
August 2, 2005
AFC	1–0	Be Quick '28

== First round ==
August 6, 2005
Ajax (amateurs) _{A}	0–4	Go Ahead Eagles _{1}
Harkemase Boys _{A}	1–4	Vitesse Arnhem _{E}
RKVV Westlandia _{A}	1–1 (p: 1-3)	TOP Oss _{1}
ACV _{A}	1–3	FC Volendam _{1}
HSV Hoek _{A}	0–3	FC Eindhoven _{1}
SV Triborgh _{A}	0–5	Roda JC _{E}
SV Urk _{A}	1–4	FC Omniworld _{1}
IJsselmeervogels _{A}	1–3	BV Veendam _{1}
RKSV Nuenen_{A}	0–8	Helmond Sport _{1}
WKE _{A}	1–4	Cambuur Leeuwarden _{1}
VUC _{A}	1–4 (aet)	MVV _{1}
Quick Boys _{A}	0–2 (aet)	FC Twente _{E}
FC Vinkenslag _{A}	0–6	NAC Breda _{E}
HSC '21 _{A}	1–0	Stormvogels Telstar _{1}
Kozakken Boys _{A}	0–4	RKC Waalwijk _{E}
FC Türkiyemspor _{A}	0–1	Rijnsburgse Boys _{A}
VV Caesar _{A}	0–5	ASWH _{A}
SC Joure _{A}	0–2	Young Ajax
EVV Echt _{A}	1–4	FC Dordrecht _{1}
August 9, 2005
VV Nijenrodes _{A}	0–7	FC Zwolle _{1}
RKSV DCG _{A}	DQ	Heracles Almelo _{E}
Ter Leede _{A}	0–1	FC Groningen _{E}
Drachtster Boys _{A}	0–3	WSV Apeldoorn _{A}
VV Gemert _{A}	2–1	RBC Roosendaal _{E}
OJC Rosmalen _{A}	0–6	VVV-Venlo _{1}
Excelsior Maassluis _{A}	2–1	FC Den Bosch _{1}
AFC _{A}	DQ	De Graafschap _{1}
Be Quick 1887 _{A}	2–3 (aet)	AGOVV Apeldoorn _{1}
Sparta '25 _{A}	0–7	NEC _{E}
USV Elinkwijk _{A}	0–10	FC Utrecht _{E}
Unitas '30_{A}	0–4	Fortuna Sittard _{1}
NEC (amateurs) _{A}	1–4	Excelsior _{1}
Groesbeekse Boys _{A}	0–12	ADO Den Haag _{E}
VV SHO _{A}	DQ	Young PSV
De Treffers _{A}	2–1	VV Baronie _{A}
RKSV Schijndel _{A}	0–5	Sparta Rotterdam _{E}
SV Argon _{A}	0–1	HFC Haarlem _{1}
WHC Wezep _{A}	3–4 (aet)	FC Emmen _{1}
ADO '20 _{A}	1–2	Excelsior '31 _{A}
August 16, 2005
UDI '19 _{A}	0–0 (p: 4-3)	SV Capelle _{A}

_{E} Eredivisie; _{1} Eerste Divisie; _{A} Amateur teams

== Second round ==
September 20, 2005
Young Ajax	3–1	Cambuur Leeuwarden
Fortuna Sittard	1–3	FC Twente
FC Emmen	2–1	UDI '19
RKC Waalwijk	4–1 (aet)	TOP Oss
WSV Apeldoorn	0–2	Helmond Sport
Excelsior	2–5	NEC
AFC	1–1 (p: 5-3)	FC Omniworld
FC Dordrecht	3–0	VV Gemert
HFC Haarlem	1–3 (aet)	MVV
Excelsior Maassluis	1–4	VVV-Venlo
FC Volendam	3–2	BV Veendam
September 21, 2005
Roda JC	4–0	Rijnsburgse Boys
HSC '21	0–2	FC Eindhoven
FC Groningen	2–1	Sparta Rotterdam
ASWH	0–4	FC Utrecht
FC Zwolle	2–4	NAC Breda
De Treffers	4–0	Excelsior '31
RKSV DCG	1–3	Go Ahead Eagles
Vitesse	3–3 (p: 5-6)	AGOVV Apeldoorn
September 28, 2005
ADO Den Haag	11–1	VV SHO

== Third round ==
October 25, 2005
Helmond Sport	1–0 (aet)	De Treffers
Go Ahead Eagles	0–1	Roda JC
AFC	0–2	MVV
Young AFC Ajax	1–0 (aet)	AGOVV Apeldoorn
FC Dordrecht	0–4	FC Volendam
FC Eindhoven	2–0	FC Emmen
NEC	2–2 (p: 5-4)	NAC Breda
FC Utrecht	1–2 (aet)	VVV-Venlo
RKC Waalwijk	1–2 (aet)	FC Twente
FC Groningen	3–0	ADO Den Haag

== Last 16 ==
Six Eredivisie teams entered the tournament this round. They had previously been playing in the Champions League and UEFA Cup.

December 20, 2005
sc Heerenveen _{E}	2–0	VVV-Venlo
MVV	3–1	Willem II _{E}
PSV _{E}	3–0	FC Twente
Helmond Sport	2–1	Young Ajax
December 21, 2005
AZ _{E}	2–0	NEC
Roda JC	1–0	Feyenoord _{E}
December 22, 2005
FC Groningen	3–0	FC Volendam
FC Eindhoven	1–6	Ajax _{E}

_{E} six Eredivisie entrants

== Quarter finals ==
January 31, 2006
Helmond Sport	0–2	Roda JC
AZ	4–0	MVV
February 1, 2006
FC Groningen	2–3	PSV
February 2, 2006
sc Heerenveen	0–3	Ajax

== Semi-finals ==
March 22, 2006
Ajax	4–1 (aet)	Roda JC
PSV	2–0 (aet)	AZ

== Final ==
7 May 2006
18:00 CEST

Ajax	2–1	PSV
Huntelaar 48', 90'	Report	Lamey 53'

De Kuip, Rotterdam
Attendance: 30,770
Referee: Pieter Vink

Both Ajax and PSV already secured a Champions League spot in the national competition. Therefore, the UEFA Cup ticket the winner of this tournament would win, could now be won in the Eredivisie play-offs.
