= 2009–10 Eerste Klasse =

Eerste Klasse
- Season: 2009–10
- Relegated: 2010–11 Tweede Klasse

2009–10 Eerste Klasse was a Dutch association football season of the Eerste Klasse.

Saturday champions were:

- A: VV Young Boys
- B: Voorschoten '97
- C: VV Heerjansdam
- D: SVZW Wierden
- E: Oranje Nassau Groningen

Sunday champions were:

- A: VV De Zouaven
- B: VV Nieuwenhoorn
- C: VV Dongen (through finals)
- D: SV Deurne
- E: VV Rigtersbleek
- F: Friesche Voetbal Club
