= Misha Engel =

Dutch footballer (born 2002)

Personal information
- Date of birth: 1 October 2002 (age 24)
- Place of birth: Broek op Langedijk, Netherlands
- Position: Centre-back

Team information
- Current team: Almere City
- Number: 15

Youth career
- –2013: BOL
- 2013–2015: AFC '34
- 2015–2021: AZ

Senior career*
Years	Team	Apps	(Gls)
2021–2025	Jong AZ	95	(2)
2025–	Almere City	15	(0)
- * Club domestic league appearances and goals as of 25 April 2026

Misha Engel (born 1 October 2002) is a Dutch professional footballer who plays as a centre-back for Eerste Divisie club Almere City.

== Career ==
=== Jong AZ ===
Engel began playing football at amateur club BOL in his hometown of Broek op Langedijk. He later joined AFC '34, before entering the youth academy of AZ in 2015.

Engel made his senior debut for Jong AZ in the Eerste Divisie on 23 August 2021, coming on as a substitute in a 1–0 win against TOP Oss. He made his first start in January 2022 against VVV-Venlo, as part of a youthful side that ended a four-month winless run with a 2–0 victory. After a series of further appearances, Engel signed a contract extension in April 2022, tying him to AZ until 2023. He scored his first professional goal on 5 September 2022 in a 3–1 win over FC Dordrecht. On 22 May 2023, AZ extended his contract until 2025.

=== Almere City ===
On 24 June 2025, Engel signed a three-year contract with Eerste Divisie side Almere City, following their relegation from the Eredivisie.
