= 2002–03 Eerste Klasse =

Eerste Klasse
- Season: 2002–3
- Relegated: 2003–04 Tweede Klasse

2002–03 Eerste Klasse was a Dutch association football season of the Eerste Klasse.

Saturday champions were:

- A: Ajax Amateurs
- B: SV ARC
- C: Achilles Veen
- D: Sparta Nijkerk
- E: Oranje Nassau Groningen

Sunday champions were:

- A: AFC '34
- B: SVVSMC
- C: RKSV Nuenen
- D: RKSV Groene Ster
- E: Rohda Raalte
- F: SC Joure
