= VV De Zouaven =

Association football club in Grootebroek, Netherlands

De Zouaven
- Full name: Voetbalvereniging De Zouaven
- Founded: 1 September 1931; 95 years ago
- Ground: Sportpark De Kloet, Grootebroek
- Capacity: 2,000
- League: Derde Klasse
- 2025–26: Tweede Klasse A, relegated
- Website: https://www.vvdezouaven.nl/
Home colours

Voetbalvereniging De Zouaven is a Dutch football club from Grootebroek in the North Holland municipality of Stede Broec. It was founded on 1 September 1931 in the neighbouring village of Lutjebroek and plays at Sportpark De Kloet. The first team competes in the Derde Klasse, the eighth tier of Dutch football.

De Zouaven played in the Hoofdklasse, then the highest level of Dutch amateur football, in the first half of the 2010s and again from 2020. The club reached the Vierde Divisie in 2022–23 and has since fallen three levels. The brothers Frank and Ronald de Boer began playing football at the club.

== History ==
=== Foundation and name ===
The club was founded on 1 September 1931 in Lutjebroek. The first matches were played on a field behind the village church.

The name honours Pieter Janszoon Jong, a man from Lutjebroek who served as a Papal Zouave in Rome in the nineteenth century. The club gives his courage and camaraderie as the reason for the choice.

De Zouaven played in the Roman Catholic football association, the RKF, until 1940.

=== Hoofdklasse years ===
De Zouaven played in the Sunday Hoofdklasse A in the 2013–14 and 2014–15 seasons. The club was relegated in 2015 and dropped to the Tweede Klasse a year later, where it spent three seasons.

Promotion back to the Eerste Klasse followed for 2019–20. That season was curtailed by the COVID-19 pandemic with De Zouaven leading the division by five points and holding a game in hand. The club was promoted to the Hoofdklasse when places became available following the promotions of Hollandia, JOS/Watergraafsmeer and GVV Unitas.

=== Renaming of the Hoofdklasse ===
De Zouaven played two seasons in the Sunday Hoofdklasse A from 2020. On 18 June 2022 the KNVB members' council approved a renaming of the Hoofdklasse to the Vierde Divisie from 2022–23. Nothing else about the competition changed. The club therefore appears in the Sunday Vierde Divisie A for 2022–23 at the same level it had played the previous season.

=== Decline ===
De Zouaven was relegated from the Vierde Divisie A to the Eerste Klasse at the end of 2022–23.

The same KNVB reform introduced weekend football to the Derde Divisie, Vierde Divisie and Eerste Klasse from 2023–24. Saturday and Sunday clubs were drawn into the same pools from that season. De Zouaven spent two seasons in the Eerste Klasse A before relegation to the Tweede Klasse.

The club played in the Sunday Tweede Klasse A in 2025–26 and was relegated again. It competes in the Derde Klasse A in 2026–27.

== Ground ==
De Zouaven plays at Sportpark De Kloet on Raadhuislaan in Grootebroek. Since the move from Lutjebroek the club has served both villages.

== Notable former players ==
The twin brothers Frank and Ronald de Boer began playing football at De Zouaven, where they were coached by their father Cees. Both went on to play for Ajax and the Netherlands.
