= Erik Willaarts =

Dutch footballer

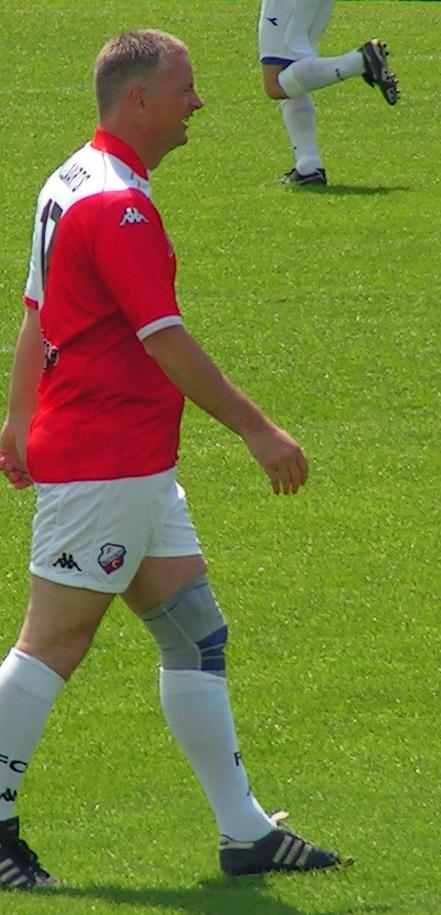

Personal information
- Date of birth: 25 August 1961 (age 65)
- Place of birth: Woudenberg, Netherlands
- Position: Forward

Youth career
- VV Woudenberg
- VV Scherpenzeel

Senior career*
Years	Team	Apps	(Gls)
1986-1987	FC Utrecht	28	(25)
1987-1988	Borussia Mönchengladbach	11	(2)
1988-1990	FC Utrecht	43	(17)
1990-1992	Dordrecht'90		(7)
1992-1993	Go Ahead Eagles	5	(1)
- * Club domestic league appearances and goals

Erik Willaarts (born 25 August 1961 in Woudenberg) is a Dutch retired footballer.

== Career ==
Willaarts shot to fame when he scored a remarkable 25 goals for FC Utrecht in the 1986-87 Eredivisie season, after only having joined them from a sixth-tier amateur side at the start of that season. He finished runner-up to the great Marco van Basten in that season's top goalscorers list which earned him a move to German Bundesliga side Borussia Mönchengladbach. He scored a club record 5 hattricks for Utrecht.

He later played for Dordrecht’90 and SVV/Dordrecht’90 and Go Ahead Eagles but injuries cut short his career.

== Personal life ==
Willaarts is an uncle of Ricky van Wolfswinkel, who played for clubs in Portugal, France en England. After retiring is as a player, Willaarts became a kitchen salesman.
