= 2025–26 in Dutch football =

Football in the Netherlands
- Season: 2025–26

Men's football
- Eredivisie: PSV
- Eerste Divisie: ADO Den Haag
- KNVB Cup: AZ
- Johan Cruyff Shield: PSV

The 2025–26 season is the 136th season of competitive football in the Netherlands.

== League season ==
=== Eredivisie ===
Pos	Team	Pld	W	D	L	GF	GA	GD	Pts	Qualification or relegation
1	PSV Eindhoven (C)	34	27	3	4	101	45	+56	84	Qualification for the Champions League league phase
2	Feyenoord	34	19	8	7	70	44	+26	65	Qualification for the Champions League league phase
3	NEC	34	16	11	7	77	53	+24	59	Qualification for the Champions League third qualifying round
4	Twente	34	15	13	6	59	40	+19	58	Qualification for the Europa League second qualifying round
5	Ajax (O)	34	14	14	6	62	41	+21	56	Qualification for the European competition play-offs
6	Utrecht	34	15	8	11	55	42	+13	53	Qualification for the European competition play-offs
7	AZ	34	14	10	10	58	51	+7	52	Qualification for the Europa League league phase (Note: Qualified for the Europa League league phase as the 2025–26 KNVB Cup winners.)
8	Heerenveen	34	14	9	11	57	53	+4	51	Qualification for the European competition play-offs
9	Groningen	34	14	6	14	49	45	+4	48	Qualification for the European competition play-offs
10	Sparta Rotterdam	34	12	7	15	40	62	−22	43	
11	Fortuna Sittard	34	11	6	17	49	63	−14	39	
12	Go Ahead Eagles	34	8	14	12	54	53	+1	38	
13	Excelsior	34	10	8	16	43	56	−13	38	
14	Telstar	34	9	10	15	49	55	−6	37	
15	PEC Zwolle	34	9	10	15	44	71	−27	37	
16	Volendam (R)	34	8	8	18	35	55	−20	32	Qualification for the Relegation play-off
17	NAC Breda (R)	34	6	11	17	35	58	−23	29	Relegation to Eerste Divisie
18	Heracles Almelo (R)	34	5	4	25	35	85	−50	19	Relegation to Eerste Divisie

Source: Eredivisie
Rules for classification: At end of season: 1) Points; 2) Goal difference; 3) Goals scored; 4) Head-to-head points; 5) Head-to-head goal difference; 6) Head-to-head goals scored; 7) Head-to-head away goals scored; 8) Play-off match or matches; 9) Penalty shoot-out (if the play-off match or matches end in a draw)
(C) Champions; (O) Play-off winners; (R) Relegated

=== Eerste Divisie ===
Pos	Team	Pld	W	D	L	GF	GA	GD	Pts	Promotion or qualification
1	ADO Den Haag (Note: Winner of the First and Second Period (Rounds 1–10 and 11–20)) (C, P)	38	29	2	7	90	37	+53	89	Promotion to the Eredivisie
2	Cambuur (Note: Winner of the Third Period (Rounds 21–29)) (P)	38	23	9	6	75	48	+27	78	Promotion to the Eredivisie
3	Willem II (Note: Winner of the Fourth Period (Round 30–38)) (O, P)	38	20	8	10	59	42	+17	68	Qualification for promotion play-offs quarterfinals
4	De Graafschap	38	18	9	11	74	58	+16	63	Qualification for promotion play-offs quarterfinals
5	Almere City	38	18	4	16	78	63	+15	58	Qualification for promotion play-offs first round
6	RKC Waalwijk	38	16	10	12	71	59	+12	58	Qualification for promotion play-offs first round
7	Jong PSV	38	17	5	16	66	64	+2	56	Reserve teams are not eligible to be promoted to the Eredivisie
8	Roda JC Kerkrade	38	14	13	11	59	54	+5	55	Qualification for promotion play-offs first round
9	Den Bosch	38	14	9	15	65	69	−4	51	Qualification for promotion play-offs first round
10	Dordrecht	38	12	11	15	48	56	−8	47	
11	Eindhoven	38	14	5	19	51	69	−18	47	
12	Jong FC Utrecht	38	12	10	16	58	62	−4	46	Reserve teams are not eligible to be promoted to the Eredivisie
13	VVV-Venlo	38	13	6	19	50	58	−8	45	
14	Emmen	38	12	9	17	58	72	−14	45	
15	Vitesse (Note: In the previous season, Vitesse were deducted 3 points for withholding information, another 3 points due to late submission of required information, and another 6 due to previous administrative shortcomings. Vitesse appealed the decisions of the deductions of these 12 points, and due to the decision of the rejection of the appeal coming after the end of the season, the penalty was instead moved to next season.)	38	15	11	12	64	55	+9	44	
16	TOP Oss	38	11	11	16	54	64	−10	44	
17	Jong AZ	38	12	4	22	61	76	−15	40	Reserve teams are not eligible to be promoted to the Eredivisie
18	Helmond Sport	38	10	9	19	42	62	−20	39	
19	MVV Maastricht	38	9	11	18	41	73	−32	38	
20	Jong Ajax	38	9	8	21	50	73	−23	35	Reserve teams are not eligible to be promoted to the Eredivisie

Source: Flashscore, Keuken Kampioen Divisie (in Dutch)
Rules for classification: Season in progress: 1) Most points won; 2) Less points lost; 3) Goal difference; 4) Goals scored; 5) Head-to-head points; 6) Head-to-head goal difference; 7) Head-to-head goals scored 8) Head-to-head away goals scored 9) Alphabetical order; End of season: 1) Points; 2) Goal difference; 3) Goals scored; 4) Head-to-head points; 5) Head-to-head goal difference; 6) Head-to-head goals scored 7) Head-to-head away goals scored; 8) Extra match or series of matches 9) Goal difference (series of matches) 10) Goals scored (series of matches) 11) Penalty shoot-out (extra match or series of matches)
(C) Champions; (O) Play-off winners; (P) Promoted

=== Tweede Divisie ===
Pos	Team	Pld	W	D	L	GF	GA	GD	Pts	Qualification or relegation
1	Quick Boys (Note: Quick Boys were deducted 1 point for unsportsmanlike behavior.) (C)	34	19	10	5	69	35	+34	66	
2	Hoek	34	20	5	9	60	36	+24	65	
3	De Treffers	34	18	8	8	63	37	+26	62	
4	Spakenburg	34	17	8	9	71	57	+14	59	
5	Rijnsburgse Boys	34	16	8	10	76	55	+21	56	
6	HHC Hardenberg	34	17	5	12	58	44	+14	56	
7	Katwijk	34	15	7	12	60	55	+5	52	
8	Jong Almere City	34	15	5	14	70	62	+8	50	
9	Kozakken Boys	34	13	8	13	47	55	−8	47	
10	Jong Sparta	34	12	9	13	71	73	−2	45	
11	AFC	34	12	9	13	46	54	−8	45	
12	Barendrecht	34	13	4	17	62	84	−22	43	
13	RKAV Volendam	34	13	3	18	50	62	−12	42	
14	GVVV	34	12	6	16	52	67	−15	42	
15	Koninklijke HFC	34	11	3	20	30	48	−18	36	
16	IJsselmeervogels	34	9	4	21	46	65	−19	31	Qualification for relegation play-offs
17	Excelsior Maassluis	34	8	7	19	39	58	−19	31	Qualification for relegation play-offs
18	ACV (R)	34	7	9	18	48	71	−23	30	Relegation to Derde Divisie

Source: Flashscore
Rules for classification: Season in progress: 1) Most points won; 2) Less points lost; 3) Goal difference; 4) Goals scored; 5) Alphabetical order; End of season: 1) Points; 2) Goal difference; 3) Goals scored; 4) Head-to-head points; 5) Head-to-head goal difference; 6) Head-to-head away goals scored; 7) Play-off if relevant for deciding champion, relegation or participating in a European league, otherwise by draw. 8) Penalty shoot-out (only after a play-off)
(C) Champions; (R) Relegated

=== Derde Divisie ===
==== A group ====
Pos	Team	Pld	W	D	L	GF	GA	GD	Pts	Promotion, qualification or relegation
1	ROHDA (Note: Winner of the First Period (Rounds 1–12)) (C, P)	34	20	7	7	63	36	+27	67	Promotion to Tweede Divisie
2	DVS '33 (Note: Winner of the Third Period (Rounds 24–34))	34	17	11	6	59	39	+20	62	Qualification for promotion play-offs
3	Sparta Nijkerk (Note: Winner of the Second Period (Rounds 13–23))	34	19	4	11	84	43	+41	61	Qualification for promotion play-offs
4	ADO '20	34	17	9	8	45	35	+10	60	Qualification for promotion play-offs
5	Genemuiden	34	17	5	12	61	52	+9	56	
6	Staphorst	34	17	3	14	63	53	+10	54	
7	Harkemase Boys	34	14	10	10	56	44	+12	52	
8	DOVO	34	15	7	12	53	43	+10	52	
9	Eemdijk	34	14	8	12	67	58	+9	50	
10	Scherpenzeel	34	14	7	13	59	49	+10	49	
11	Hoogeveen	34	14	6	14	54	64	−10	48	
12	Sportlust '46	34	14	5	15	54	52	+2	47	
13	Hercules	34	13	5	16	53	57	−4	44	
14	Excelsior '31	34	12	4	18	49	57	−8	40	
15	Huizen	34	11	7	16	51	63	−12	40	Qualification for relegation play-offs
16	TEC	34	12	4	18	48	64	−16	40	Qualification for relegation play-offs
17	Urk (R)	34	8	7	19	61	97	−36	31	Relegation to Vierde Divisie
18	HSC '21 (R)	34	1	5	28	35	109	−74	8	Relegation to Vierde Divisie

Source: Flashscore
Rules for classification: Season in progress: 1) Most points won; 2) Less points lost; 3) Goal difference; 4) Goals scored; 5) Alphabetical order; End of season: 1) Points; 2) Goal difference; 3) Goals scored; 4) Head-to-head points; 5) Head-to-head goal difference; 6) Head-to-head away goals scored; 7) Play-off if relevant for deciding champion, relegation or participating in a European league, otherwise by draw. 8) Penalty shoot-out (only after a play-off)
(C) Champions; (P) Promoted; (R) Relegated
Notes:

Pos	Team	Pld	W	D	L	GF	GA	GD	Pts	Promotion, qualification or relegation
1	Kloetinge (Note: Winner of the First and Third Period (Rounds 1–12 and 24–34)) (C, P)	34	22	7	5	68	43	+25	73	Promotion to Tweede Divisie
2	Lisse (Note: Winner of the Second Period (Rounds 13–23))	34	20	8	6	67	33	+34	68	Qualification for promotion play-offs
3	VVSB	34	21	5	8	70	37	+33	68	Qualification for promotion play-offs
4	Rijnvogels	34	19	7	8	63	39	+24	64	Qualification for promotion play-offs
5	Gemert	34	17	10	7	71	46	+25	61	
6	RBC	34	15	9	10	71	58	+13	54	
7	TOGB	34	15	8	11	64	61	+3	53	
8	Zwaluwen	34	15	6	13	61	48	+13	51	
9	Blauw Geel '38	34	14	6	14	53	51	+2	48	
10	Noordwijk	34	12	8	14	56	51	+5	44	
11	UDI '19	34	11	6	17	57	74	−17	39	
12	UNA	34	10	8	16	51	59	−8	38	
13	GOES	34	10	7	17	43	61	−18	37	
14	Groene Ster	34	10	6	18	45	64	−19	36	
15	SteDoCo	34	10	4	20	35	69	−34	34	Qualification for relegation play-offs
16	Scheveningen	34	9	5	20	49	65	−16	32	Qualification for relegation play-offs
17	Meerssen (R)	34	8	7	19	47	70	−23	31	Relegation to Vierde Divisie
18	ASWH (R)	34	6	7	21	45	87	−42	25	Relegation to Vierde Divisie

Source: Flashsore
Rules for classification: Season in progress: 1) Most points won; 2) Less points lost; 3) Goal difference; 4) Goals scored; 5) Alphabetical order; End of season: 1) Points; 2) Goal difference; 3) Goals scored; 4) Head-to-head points; 5) Head-to-head goal difference; 6) Head-to-head away goals scored; 7) Play-off if relevant for deciding champion, relegation or participating in a European league, otherwise by draw. 8) Penalty shoot-out (only after a play-off)
(C) Champions; (P) Promoted; (R) Relegated

=== Eredivisie (women) ===
Pos	Team	Pld	W	D	L	GF	GA	GD	Pts	Qualification
1	PSV (C)	22	17	3	2	56	15	+41	54	Qualification to Champions League second qualifying round
2	Ajax	22	15	5	2	55	18	+37	50	Qualification to Champions League second qualifying round
3	Feyenoord	22	14	5	3	45	17	+28	47	Qualification to Europa Cup first qualifying round
4	Twente	22	14	4	4	55	19	+36	46	
5	Utrecht	22	11	4	7	41	37	+4	37	
6	PEC Zwolle	22	11	1	10	35	32	+3	34	
7	Heerenveen	22	8	2	12	38	51	−13	26	
8	AZ	22	6	6	10	36	46	−10	24	
9	ADO Den Haag	22	6	4	12	24	45	−21	22	
10	Hera United (Note: Following the promotion of De Graafschap through the playoffs, Hera United were relegated) (R)	22	5	5	12	24	42	−18	20	Possible relegation to the Vrouwen Eerste Divisie
11	Excelsior (R)	22	2	2	18	18	51	−33	8	Relegation to the Vrouwen Eerste Divisie
12	NAC Breda (R)	22	2	1	19	17	71	−54	7	Relegation to the Vrouwen Eerste Divisie

Source: Vrouwen Eredivisie (in Dutch)
Rules for classification: Season in progress: 1) Most points won; 2) Less points lost; 3) Goal difference; 4) Goals scored; 5) Head-to-head points; 6) Head-to-head goal difference; 7) Head-to-head away goals scored; 8) Alphabetical order; End of season: 1) Points; 2) Goal difference; 3) Goals scored; 4) Head-to-head points; 5) Head-to-head goal difference; 6) Head-to-head away goals scored; 7) Play-off match, including extra time and a penalty shoot-out, if necessary.
(C) Champions; (R) Relegated
