= VV Scherpenzeel =

- Full name: Voetbalvereniging Scherpenzeel
- Founded: 17 April 1918
- Manager: Jürgen Schefczyk
- League: Derde Divisie
- 2024–25: Vierde Divisie A, 1st of 16 (promoted)
Home colors

Voetbalvereniging Scherpenzeel is an association football club from Scherpenzeel, Netherlands. Its ground is Sportpark De Bree-Oost.

== History ==
VV Scherpenzeel was founded on 17 April 1918.

The club initially played on Sundays. The Sunday team won section championships in the Zevende Klasse in 1997 and Vierde Klasse in 1984. In the 1980s a Saturday team was added, so much more successful than its Sunday counterpart that eventually Sunday football was dropped. The Saturday team won section championships in the Vierde Klasse in 1982 and 2014, Derde Klasse in 1984, and Tweede Klasse in 1985 and 2018.

In 2020 Scherpenzeel promoted for the first time to the Hoofdklasse, based on a first-position finish (one point ahead of WV-HEDW) but no championship in the Eerste Klasse, after the season was cut short due to the COVID-19 pandemic in the Netherlands.

In the 2023–24 season, Scherpenzeel qualified for the promotion playoffs. It lost on penalties to SV HBC in the first round.

=== Chief coach ===
==== Saturday football ====
- (Netherlands) Dennis Koorn (2012–2015)
- (Netherlands) Richard van Vliet (2015)
- (Netherlands) Jan Gaasbeek (2015–2016)
- (Netherlands) Dik Peters van Ton (2016–2019)
- (Germany) Jürgen Schefczyk (since 2019)

=== Former players who turned professional ===
- Simone van de Weerd
- Erik Willaarts
