= CSV BOL =

Dutch football club

- Full name: Christelijke Sport Vereniging Broek op Langedijk
- Nickname: BOL
- Founded: 26 July 1949
- Ground: Het Bolwerk, Broek op Langedijk, Netherlands
- Capacity: 500
- Chairman: Jan Alex Brandsma
- Head Coach: Dohan Karacaer
- League: Eerste Klasse
- Website: http://www.csvbol.nl/
colors	colors	colors

CSV BOL is a football club from Broek op Langedijk, Netherlands. Its first team plays in the Saturday Eerste klasse since summer 2024.

== History ==
=== 20th century ===
The Christelijke Sport Vereniging Broek op Langedijk (CSV BOL) was founded on 26 July 1949. It won a its first and only section championship in the Vierde Klasse in 1967, the first year it played it in the main KNVB leagues.

=== 21st century ===
In 2011, BOL won its first championship in the Derde Klasse. BOL has been playing since 2013 in the Tweede Klasse as well as in the season 2011–12. In the intermediate season, 2012–13, Pieter-Bas den Hartigh scored 51 goals for CSV BOL, obtaining a split first place on the top scorer list of North Holland. It finished that year section champion in the Derde Klasse.

BOL has won section championships in the Tweede Klasse in 2017 and 2018. After promoting to the Eerste klasse in the season 2018–19, BOL won the competition for the first time in the clubs history in 2023. On the 25th of August 2023, BOL won the Sauerkraut Cup (Zuurkoolcup) for a fifth consecutive year. The summer after, the club managed to get their sixth Sauerkraut Cup title in a row.

In their first season on the 5th level, the club could not manage to stay up after play-offs. In the 2024-25 season, the club once more competes at the Eerste Klasse level (6th Dutch). This year the first team plays under new head coach Charles van Altena, who took over after 4-year manager Erwin Tump decided to leave the club. Van Altena decided after one season he would not stay on for another year, after which Dohan Karacaer was appointed as new head coach for the 2025-26 season.
