= SV Venray =

Dutch football club

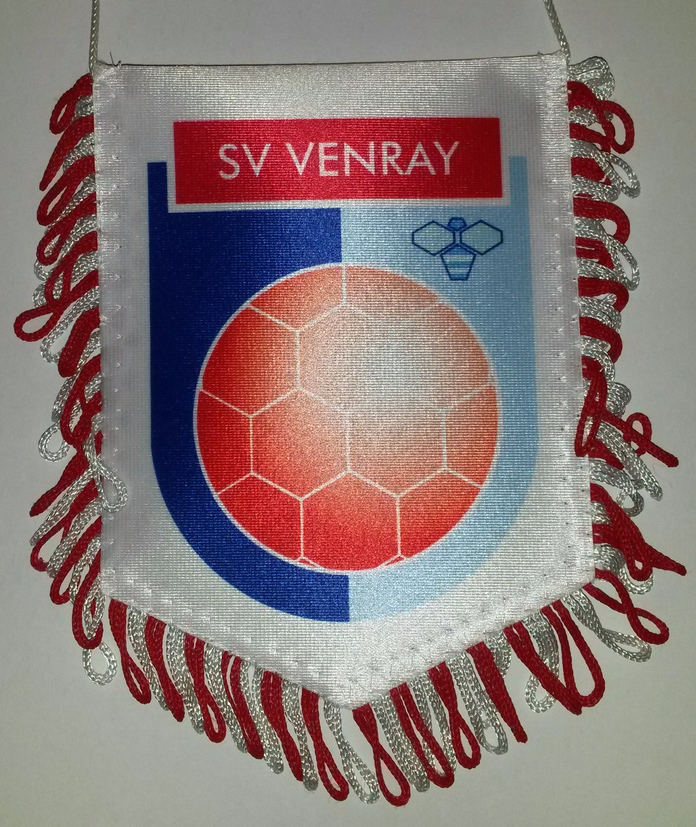
- Full name: Sportvereniging Venray
- Founded: 26 March 1945; 80 years ago
- Ground: De Wieën, Venray
- Manager: Sjoerd van der Coelen
- League: Vierde Divisie C
- 2023–24: Vierde Divisie C, 6th of 16
- Website: http://www.svvenray.nl/
Home colours

SV Venray is a football club based in Venray, Netherlands, that competes in the Vierde Divisie C, the fifth tier of the Dutch football league system.

Venray became champions of the 1988–89 Sunday Hoofdklasse C. At that time, the Hoofdklasse was the highest tier of Dutch amateur football.

Venray also won the 1987 KNVB District Cup in the Zuid 2 (South 2) District. The club went on to win the 1987 KNVB Amateur Cup.
