= Scherpenzeel, Gelderland =

Scherpenzeel
- Municipality
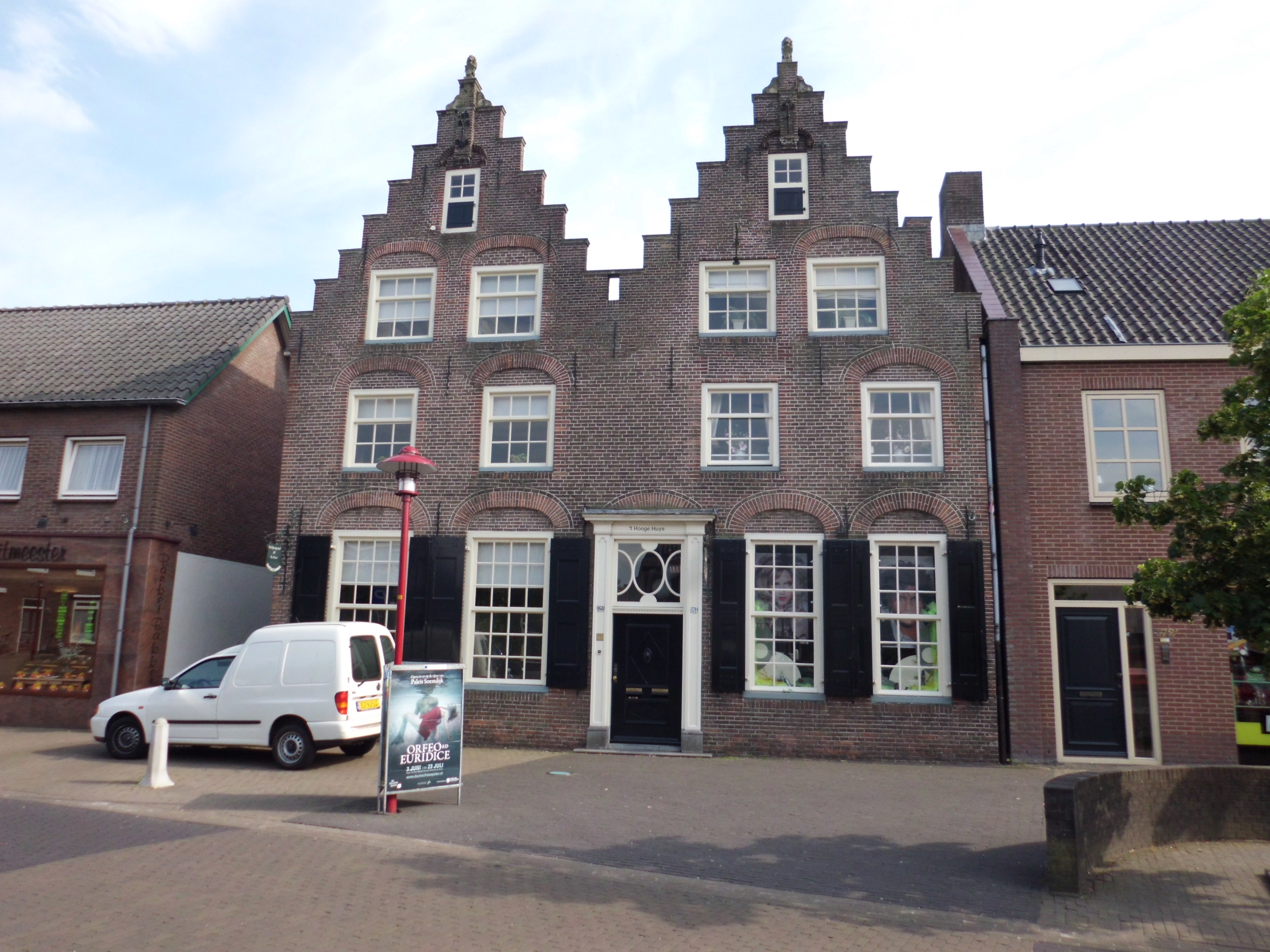
- Monumental home in Scherpenzeel

- Flag Coat of arms

- Location in Gelderland
- Coordinates: 52°5′N 5°28′E
- Country: Netherlands
- Province: Gelderland

Government
  - Body: Municipal council
  - Mayor: Marieke Teunissen (VVD)

Area
  - Total: 13.81 km^{2} (5.33 sq mi)
  - Land: 13.79 km^{2} (5.32 sq mi)
  - Water: 0.02 km^{2} (0.0077 sq mi)
- Elevation: 5 m (16 ft)

Population (January 2021)
  - Total: 10,128
  - Density: 734/km^{2} (1,900/sq mi)
- Time zone: UTC+1 (CET)
  - Summer (DST): UTC+2 (CEST)
- Postcode: 3925
- Area code: 033
- Website: www.scherpenzeel.nl

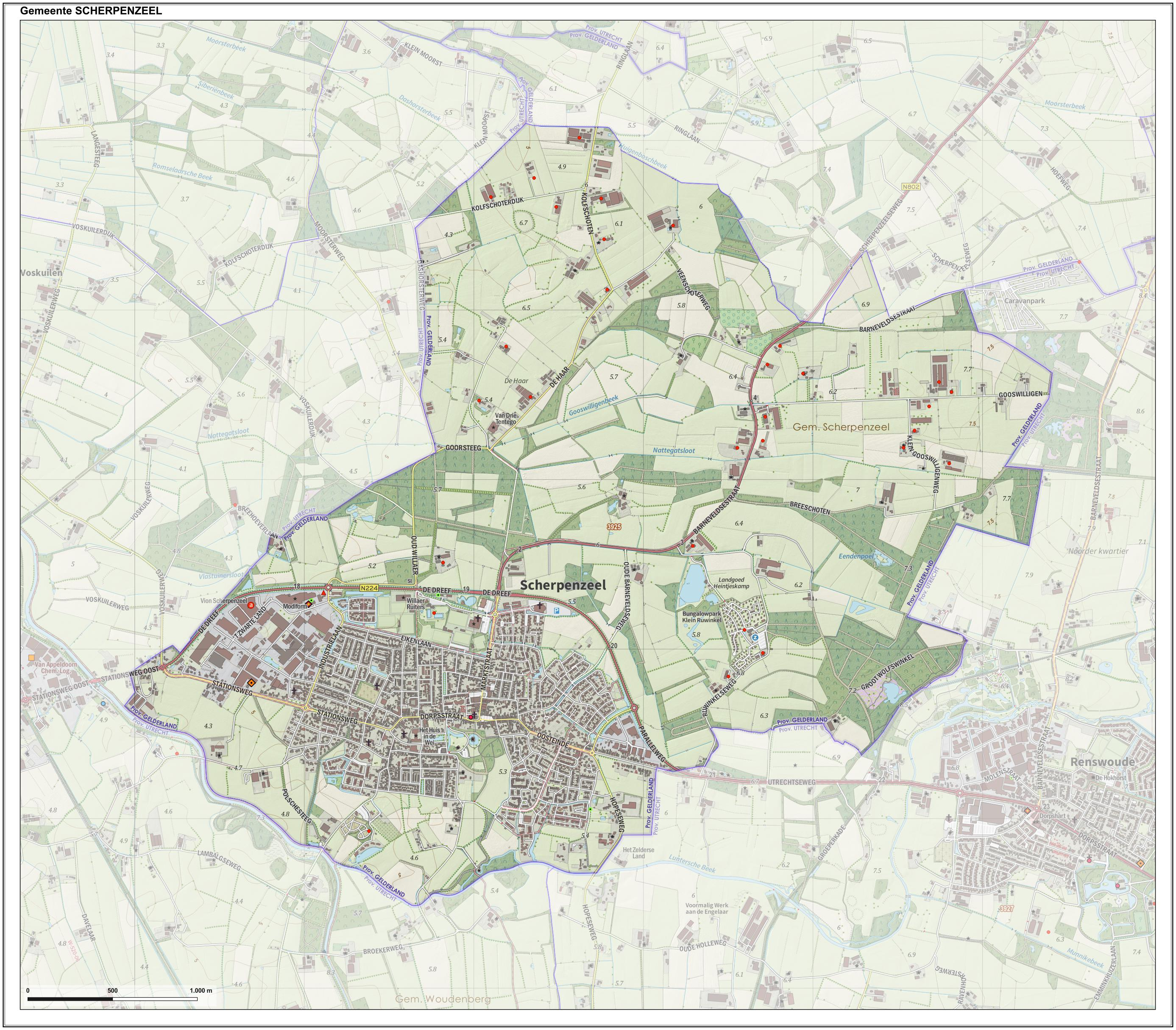
Topographic map of Scherpenzeel, 2015

Scherpenzeel (Dutch pronunciation: [ˈsxɛrpə(n)ˌzeːl]) is a municipality and a town in the Dutch province of Gelderland. As of 2021, it has a population of 10,128, with approximately 6,000 adults. The community of Scherpenzeel also contains a part of the hamlet of Moorst.

== History ==
=== Founding ===
Centuries ago, what is now the Netherlands was still a collection of small states, ruled by bishops, earls, dukes, and lords. These rulers were constantly at war over territory, causing fortifications and defenses to be built in border areas. This was the case in the Veluwe hills, which lay along the border of what is now Utrecht and Gelderland, where many castles and fortresses were constructed as safe havens. Hence, the name "Scherpenzeel", formerly known as "Scarpenzele", allows us to infer that there was a settlement built around a house ("zele") with sharpened poles ("scarpen"), the prototype of an old castle.

The possession of Scherpenzeel was at various times claimed by either Gelderland or Utrecht, but it has now been a part of Gelderland since September 1814.

== Scherpenzeel House (town hall) ==
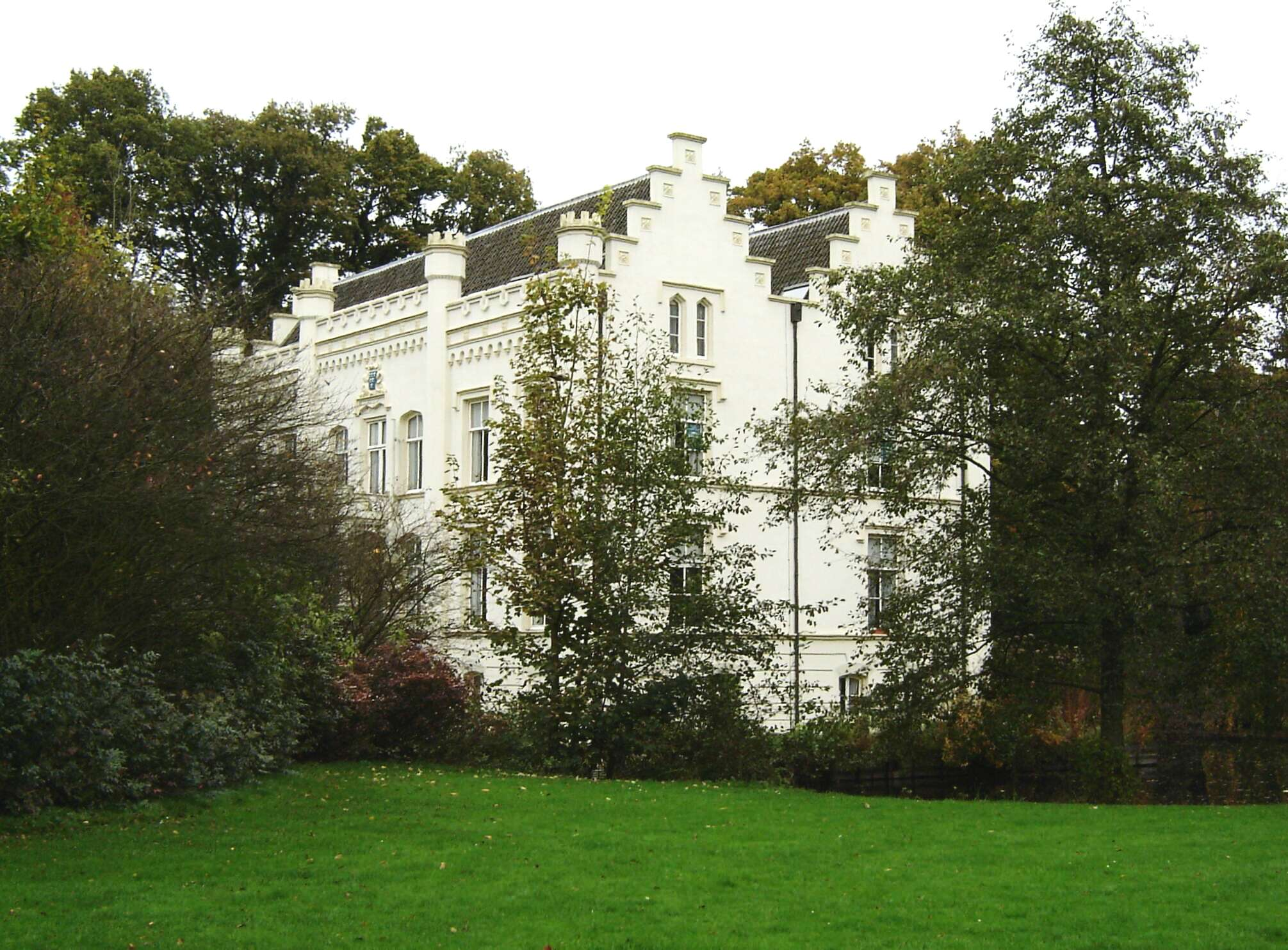
Scherpenzeel House

The town's most notable landmark, Scherpenzeel House (Huize Scherpenzeel in Dutch; located at 3 Burgemeester Royaardslaan) began as a 14th-century tower house. In the following centuries, it underwent several modifications. In 1652, it was expanded considerably by Lady Aleyd of Scherpenzeel. In the years 1857–1858, it acquired its present Neo-Gothic form, designed by S.A. van Lunteren, who also designed the surrounding park. At the time it belonged to the Royaard family, who maintained residence there until 1956. In 1975, Scherpenzeel House was declared a national monument and entrusted to the municipality. The building was used as the town hall until 2003.

In 2005, it was let to the Friends of Geldersche Castles Foundation, who keep it open to the public and allow wedding ceremonies to be held there.

== Gallery ==
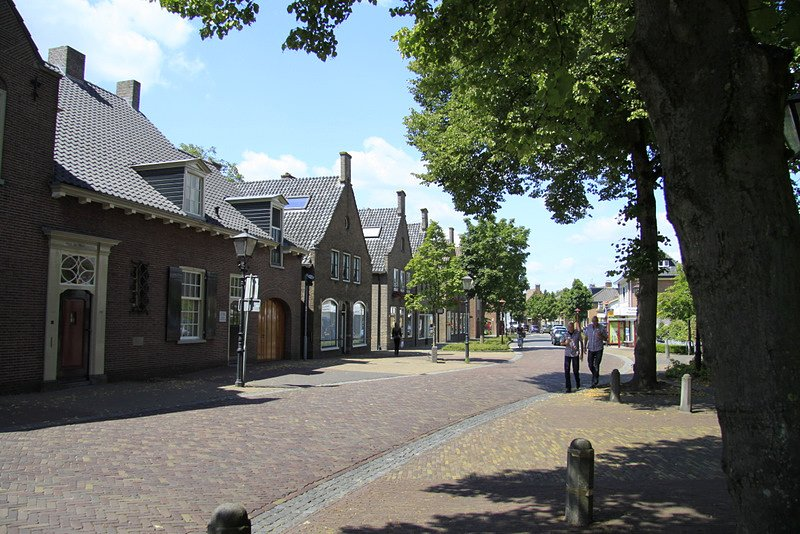
Dorpsgezicht Scherpenzeel

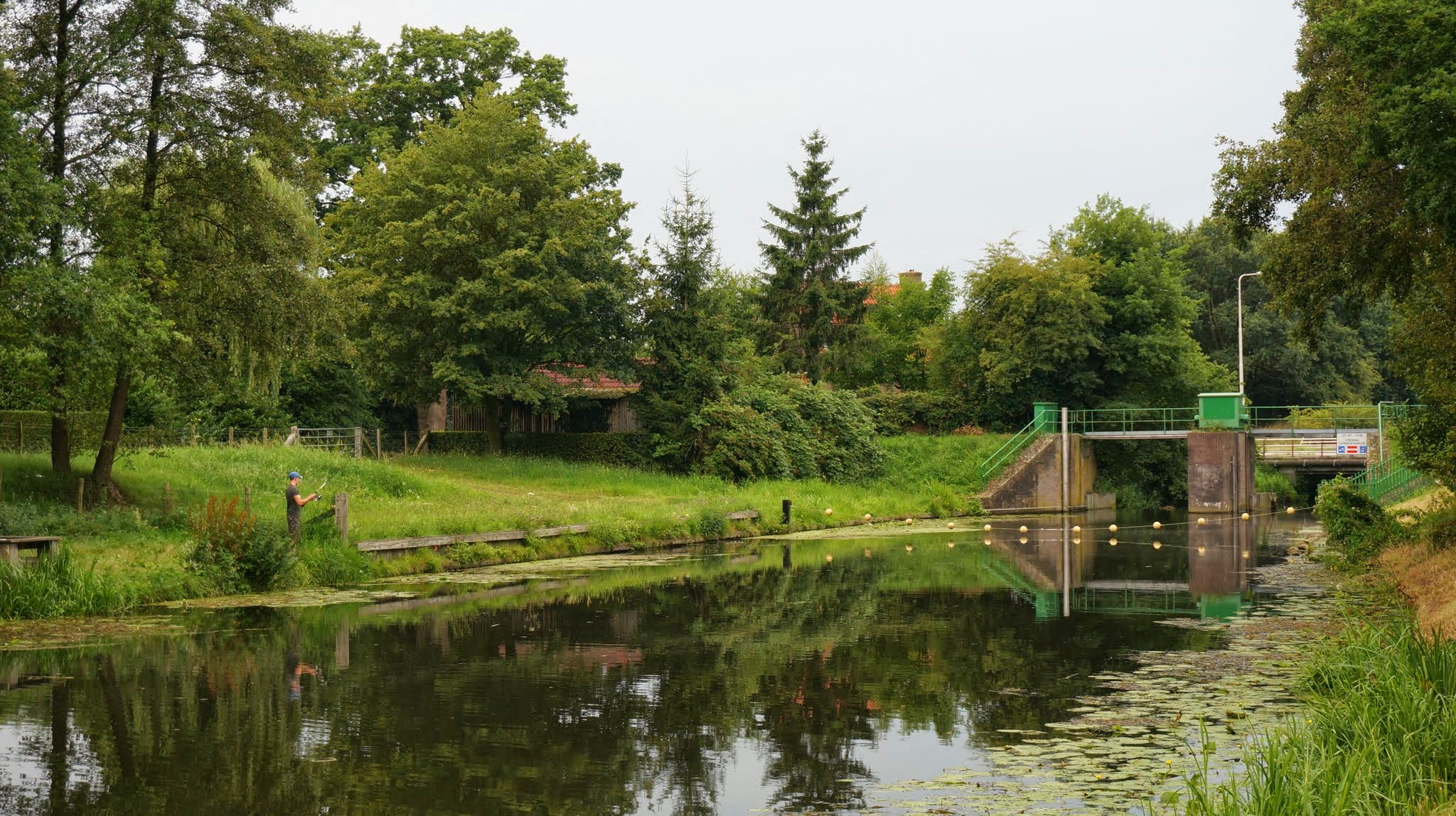
Scherpenzeel, panoramio

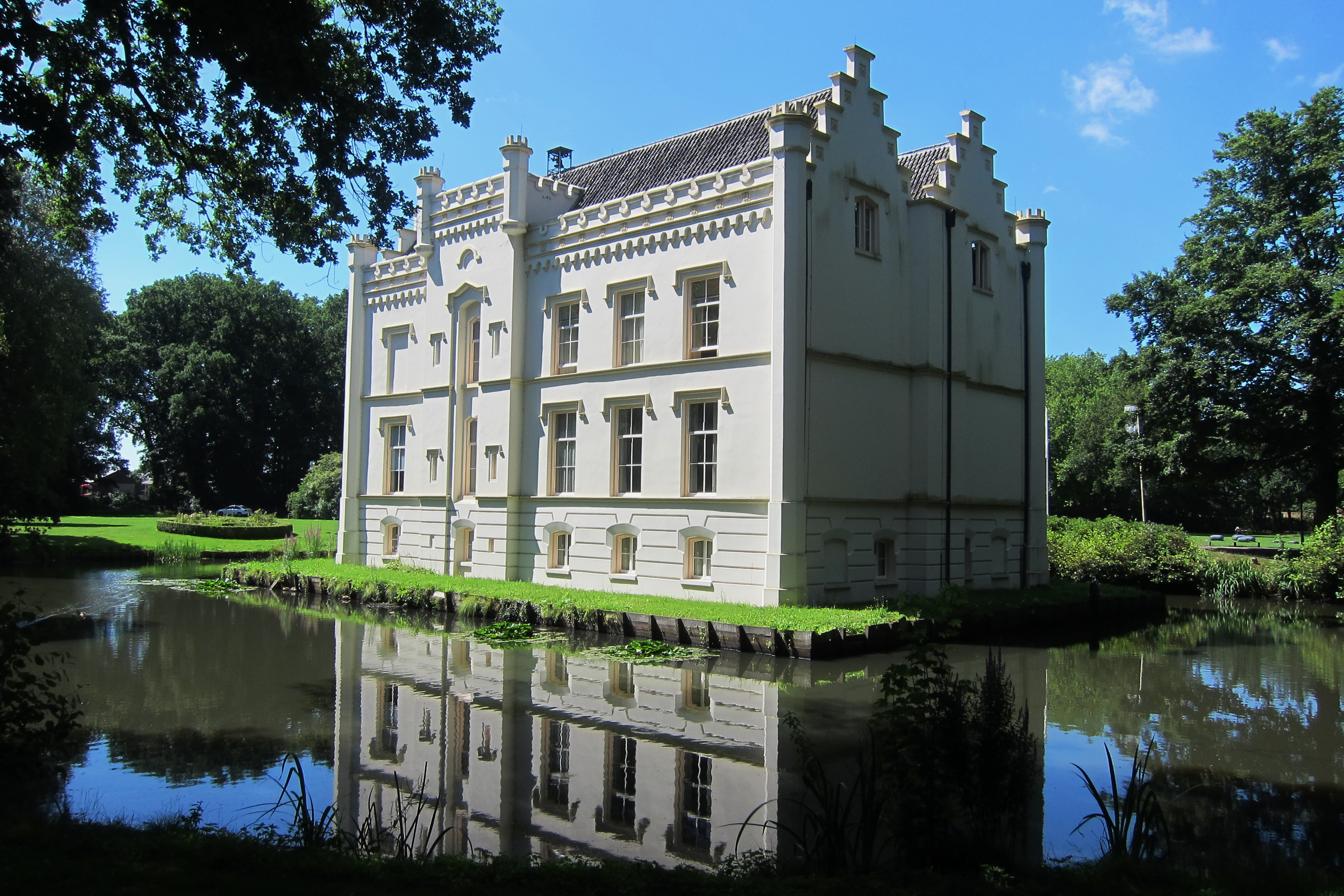
Manor of Scherpenzeel, panoramio

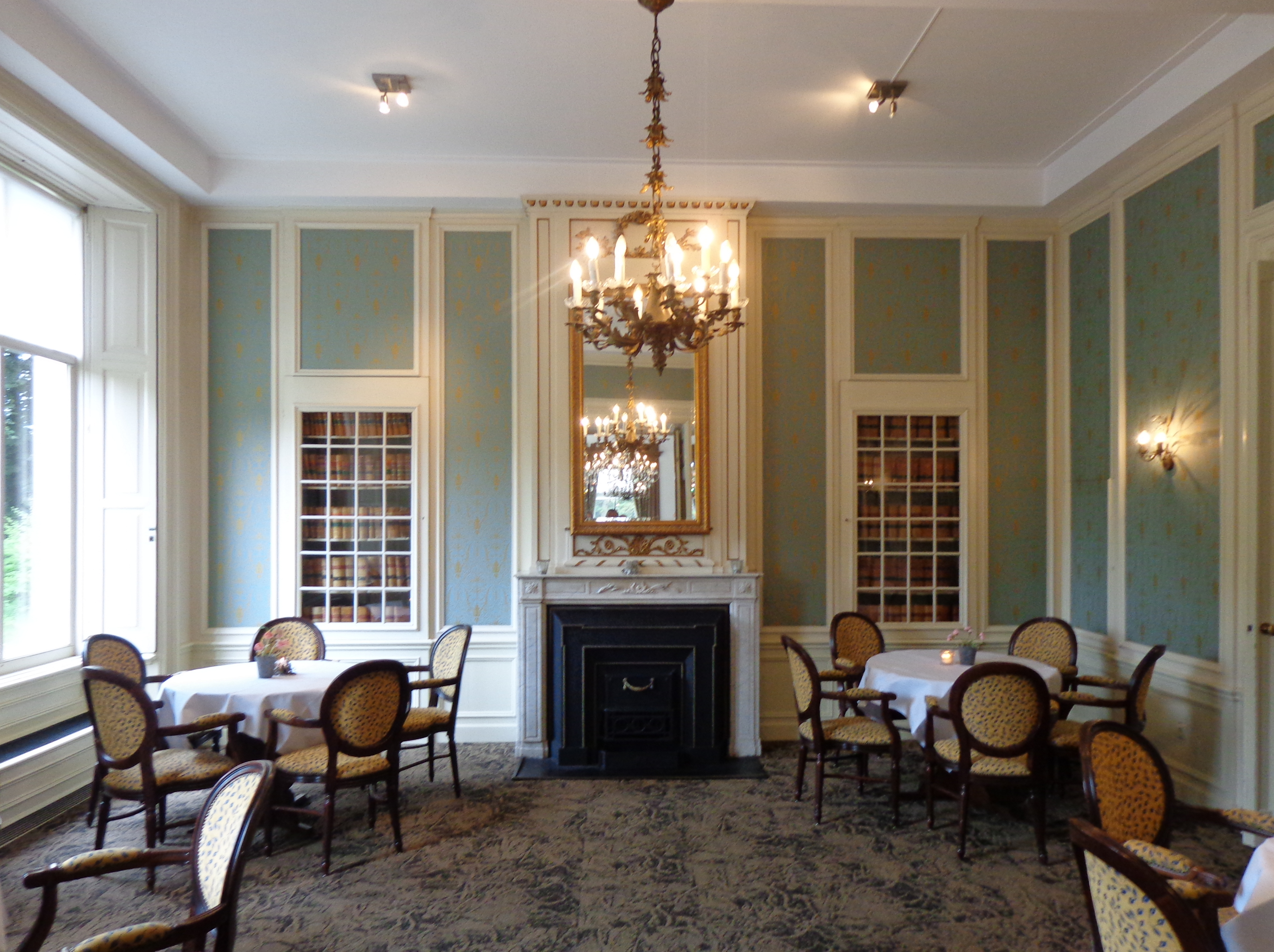
Huis Scherpenzeel Beneden
