= Broek op Langedijk =

- Village
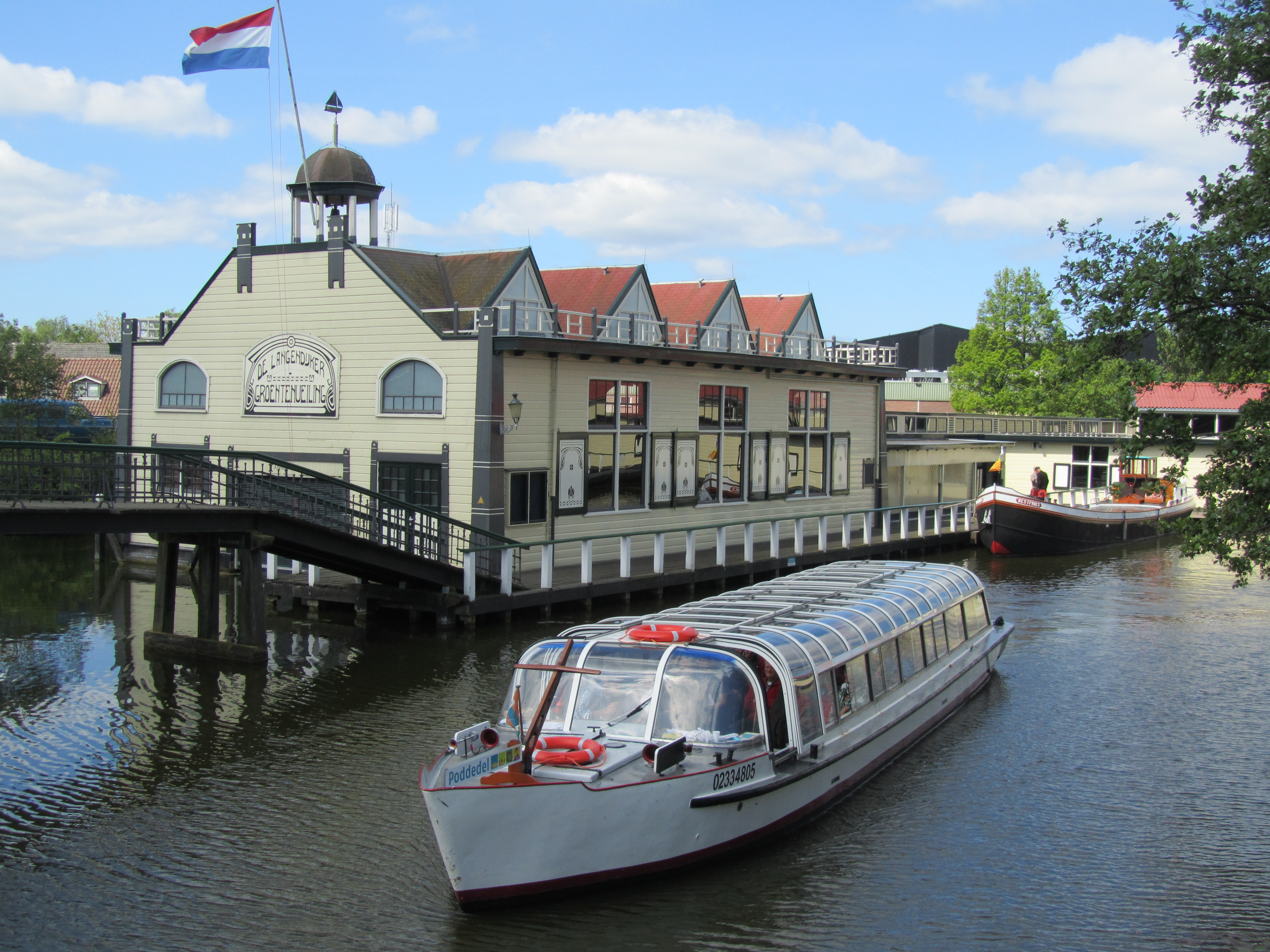
- Museum Broekerveiling

- Location in the Netherlands Location in the province of North Holland in the Netherlands
- Coordinates: 52°40′21″N 4°48′20″E
- Country: Netherlands
- Province: North Holland
- Municipality: Dijk en Waard

Area
  - Total: 4.65 km^{2} (1.80 sq mi)
- Elevation: −0.3 m (−0.98 ft)

Population (2021)
  - Total: 6,150
  - Density: 1,320/km^{2} (3,430/sq mi)
- Time zone: UTC+1 (CET)
  - Summer (DST): UTC+2 (CEST)
- Postal code: 1721
- Dialing code: 0226

Broek op Langedijk (West Frisian Dutch: Broek op Lengedìk) is a village in the municipality of Dijk en Waard in the province of North Holland, the Netherlands.

== History ==
The village was first mentioned in the 12th century but documented in 1420 as "Broec" which means marshy or swampy land (broek in modern Dutch), and the modern name, Broek-op-Langedijk means "swampy land upon long dike". Broek op Langedijk developed along the dike as a linear settlement. The swamp was cultivated and upon the islands, farms were built, which were nicknamed "Rijk der duizend eilanden", meaning Realm/Empire of the thousand islands. The islands were used to grow cabbage and in 1887, an auction house was established in Broek op Langedijk.

The Dutch Reformed church is a single aisled church with wooden tower from the 15th century. Around 1860, the front and tower were renovated.

The auction house is a large wooden complex surrounded by water. It was built in 1912 and was influenced by Jugendstil. In 1968, the auction merged with the Noord-Scharwoude auction and moved. In 1974, a museum was established in the former auction which allows visitors to bid on fruit and vegetables in household portions.

Broek op Langendijk was home to 700 people in 1840. It was a separate municipality until 1941, when the municipality of Langedijk was formed. In 2022, it became part of the municipality of Dijk en Waard.

== Gallery ==
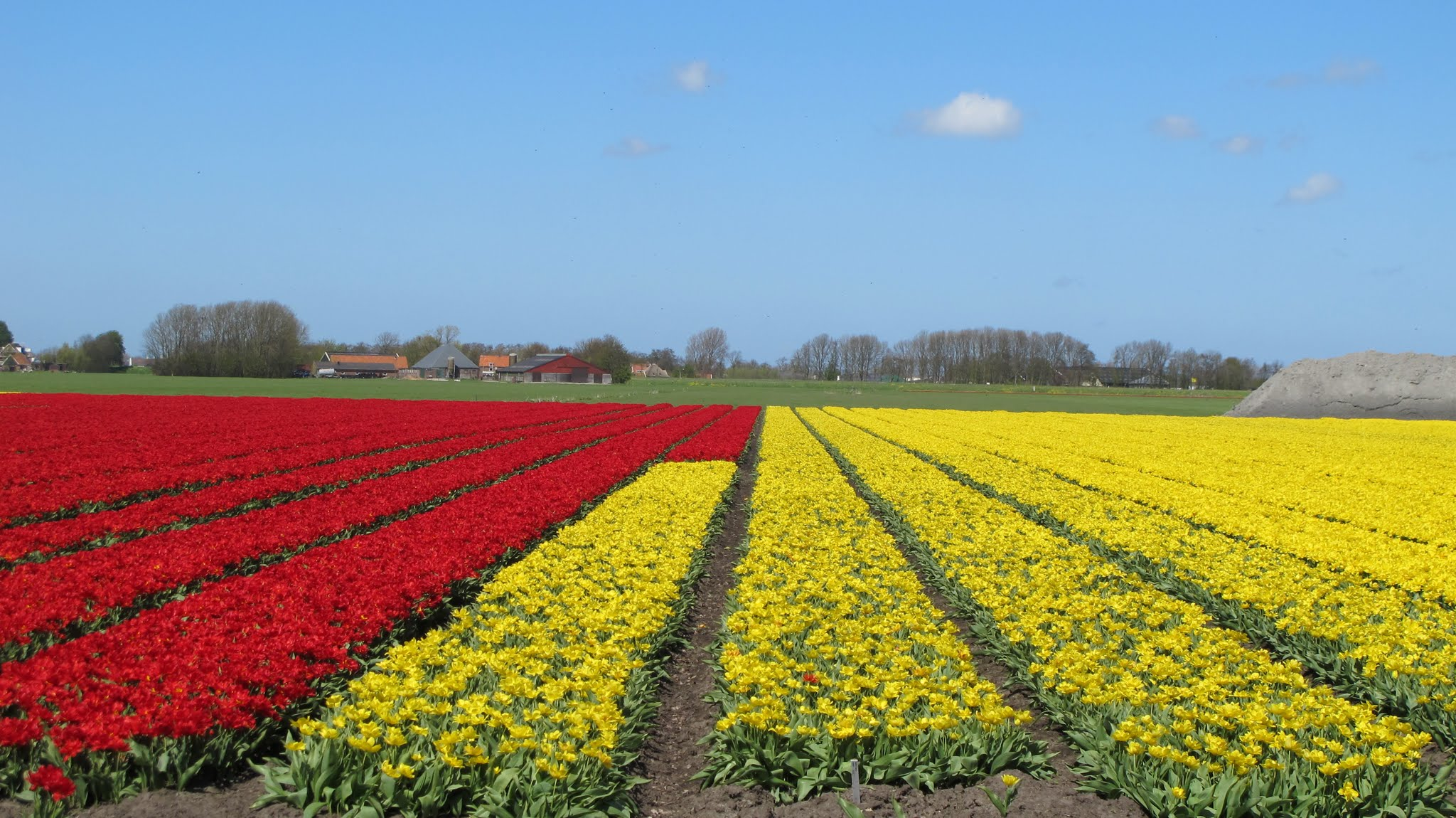
Flower field in Broek op Langedijk

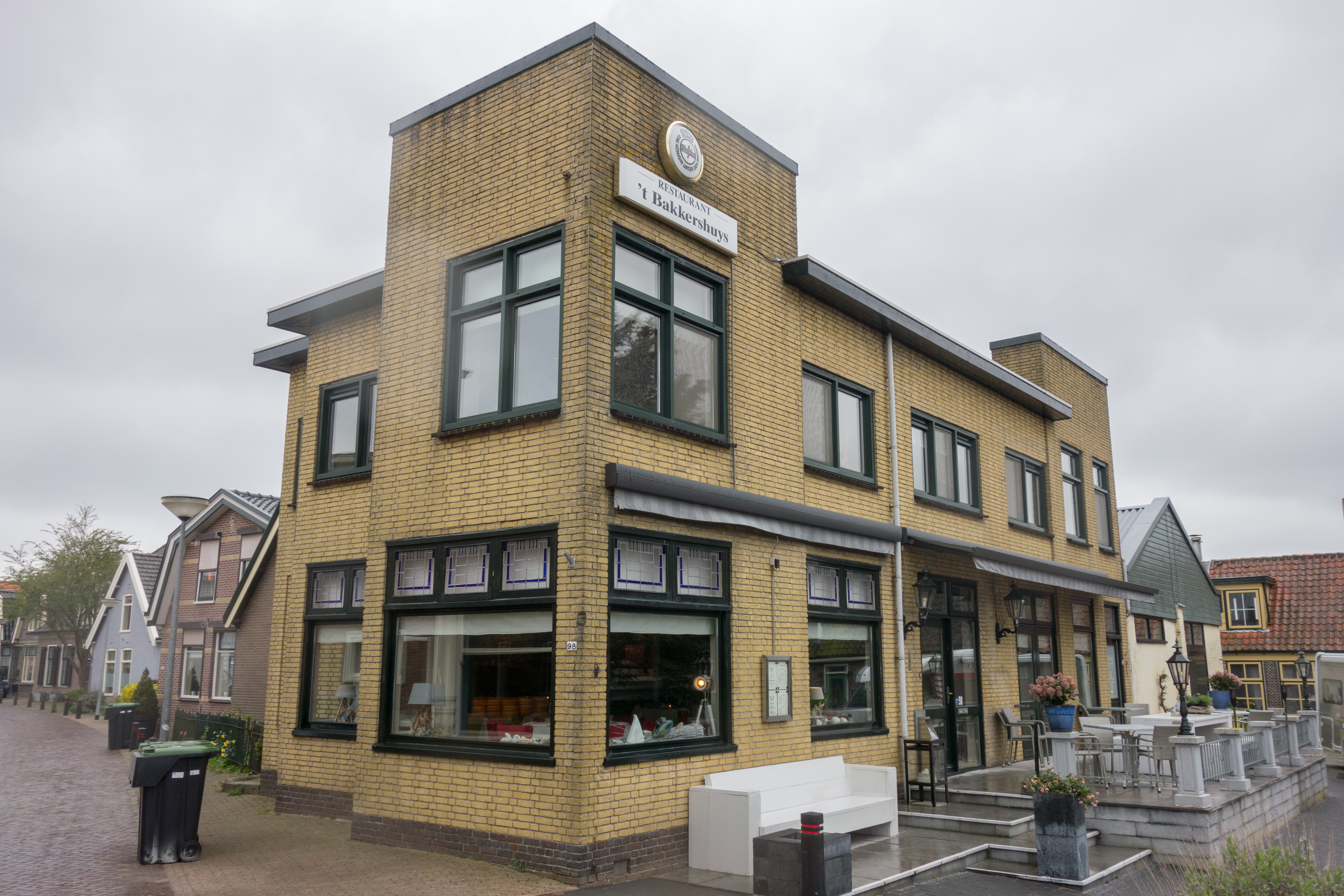
Bakery

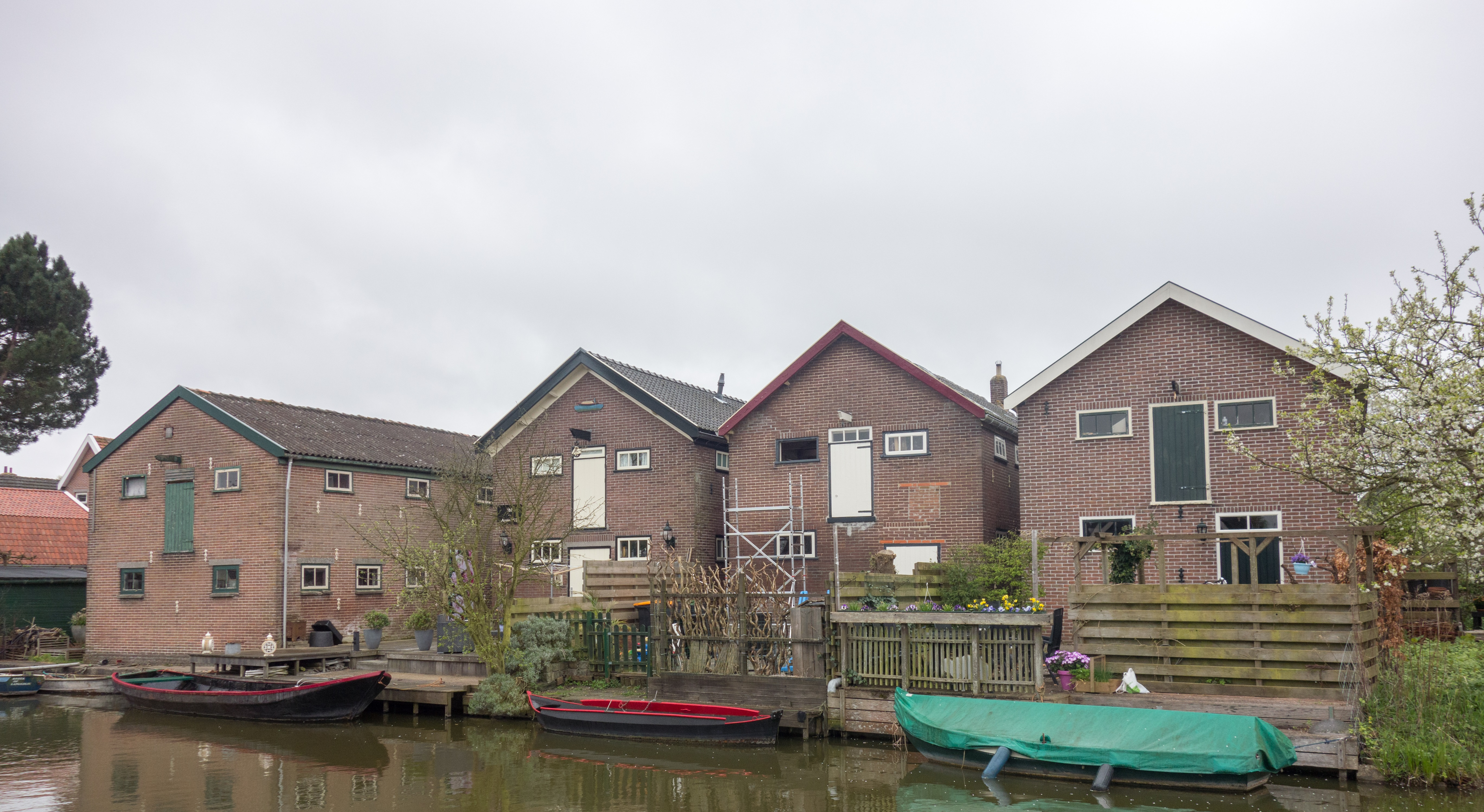
Cabbage warehouse

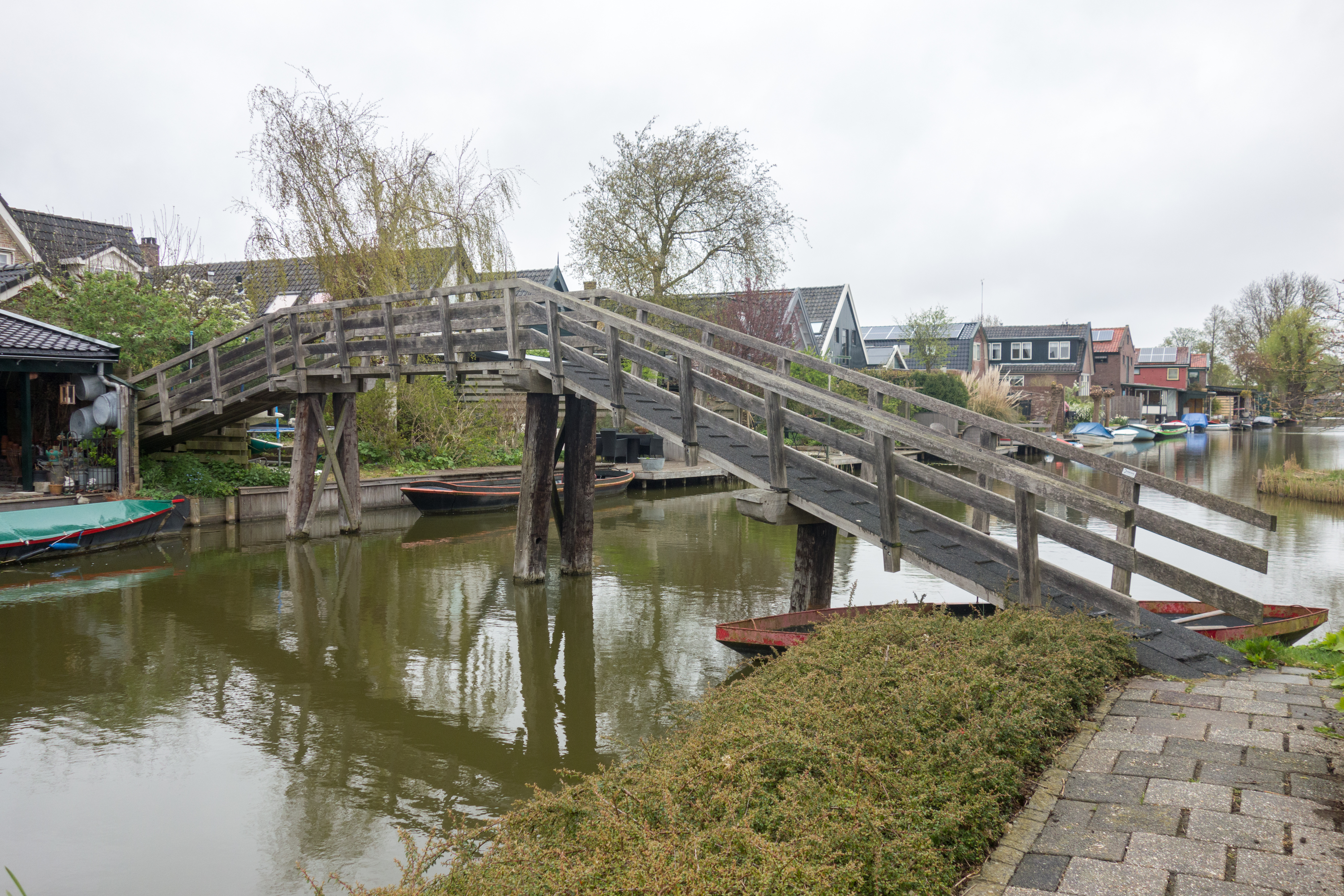
Wooden bridge

== In popular culture ==
The village is featured in the movie Spider-Man: Far From Home. Peter Parker ends up there by accident, breaks out of a municipal holding facility and asks a local man where he is. Parker gets him to speak the village's name directly into his phone, allowing Happy Hogan to fly there to pick him up.
