= Unitas '30 =

- Founded: 10 May 1930
- Ground: Etten Leur, Netherlands
- League: Vierde Divisie
colours

Unitas '30 is an association football club from Etten Leur, Netherlands. It was founded on 10 May 1930 as Sparta. Since 2022 it plays for the first time in its history in the Vierde Divisie, still known as Hoofdklasse when it secured the promotion.
