= VV Smitshoek =

Association football club in Barendrecht, Netherlands

- Full name: Voetbalvereniging Smitshoek
- Founded: 23 June 1960; 66 years ago
- Ground: Sportpark Smitshoek, Barendrecht
- Chairman: Gert-Jan Bravenboer
- Manager: Richard van Cappellen
- League: Vierde Divisie
- 2024–25: Derde Divisie B, 17th of 18 (relegated)
- Website: www.vvsmitshoek.nl
Home colours

Voetbalvereniging Smitshoek is a football club based in Barendrecht, Netherlands. It was founded in 1960. It plays its home matches at Sportpark Smitshoek.

== History ==
The Voetbalvereniging Smitshoek was founded on 23 June 1960.

=== 21st century ===
In 2005, a Smitshoek game against VV BMT from The Hague evolved into a physical fight.

Since 2012, Smitshoek plays in the Hoofdklasse, with the exception of 2015–16 back in the Eerste Klasse. In 2016, Smitshoek won an Eerste Klasse championship at an eight-point advantage on its next competitor.

In 2022, the Hoofdklasse became Vierde Divisie so Smitshoek become a Vierde Divisie side. During 2024-2205, Smitshoek played one season in the Derde Divisie.

== Managers ==
Period	Manager
1976–78	(Netherlands) Cees van Bennekom
1978–80	(Netherlands) Cees Brussaard
1980–82	(Netherlands) Harry Camijn
1982–88	(Netherlands) Daan den Bleijker
1988–90	(Netherlands) Jan van Baaren
1990–91	(Netherlands) Rob Theuns
1991–9?	(Netherlands) Jan van der Meer
199?–95	(Netherlands) René Blaauwkamp

Period	Manager
1995	(Netherlands) Piet Schuitenmaker
1995–2001	(Netherlands) Jan de Gier
2001–03	(Netherlands) Ab van Wijk
2003–08	(Netherlands) Hans de Rover
2008–10	(Netherlands) Hans Maus
2010–17	(Netherlands) Raymond Frehé
2017–20	(Netherlands) Richard Middelkoop
2020–25	(Netherlands) Edwin de Koning
2025–	(Netherlands) Richard van Capellen
