= RKSV Nuenen =

Dutch football club

- Full name: Rooms-Katholieke Sportvereniging Nuenen
- Founded: 15 May 1922
- Ground: Oude Landen, Nuenen
- Chairman: Rens van de Nieuwenhof
- League: Hoofdklasse Sunday A (2019–20)
- Website: https://www.rksvnuenen.nl/
Home colours

RKSV Nuenen is a football club from Nuenen, Netherlands. The first squad of Nuenen is playing in the Sunday Hoofdklasse (5th tier) since 2016. The first women squad plays in the Hoofdklasse for women (3rd tier) since 2014 or 2015.

== History ==
The club was founded in 1922 and the club colours were red and white.

=== 1950s–1960s: The Vierde Klasse era ===
RKSV Nuenen started playing in the Vierde Klasse of the Royal Dutch Football Association in 1948.

It changed its club colours to green and white in 1955.

In the 1969 Nuenen won the championship of its Vierde Klasse and promoted to the Derde Klasse.

=== 1970s–1980s: Derde and Vierde Klasse ===
After five strong seasons in the Derde Klasse, in 1976 RKSV ended 12th and found its way back to the Vierde Klasse. Five strong seasons in the Vierde Klasse followed.

Another section championship in 1980 brought RKSV back to the Derde Klasse. Not for long as one year later it was back in the Vierde Klasse for another section championship, promoting once again in 1982.

Nuenen continued in the Derde Klasse for the remainder of 1980s.

=== 1990s–2000s: Tweede Klasse, above and below ===
As in the early seventies, by the early nineties, RKSV was once again a leading Derde Klasse team (with the exception of the weaker 1990–1991 season). As results kept improving in 1994, it grabbed its first Derde Klasse championship and found itself playing that year for the first time in the Tweede Klasse. In the Tweede Klasse it performed well starting from the first season, taking the section championship in 2001.

In 2002 Nuenen finished 8th in the Eerste Klasse and as early as its second season it won its first Eerste Klasse championship to reach the Hoofdklasse for the very first time. Ernie Brandts coached during this foray into the Hoofdklasse. Not quite ready for the challenge, RKSV finished 13th, and went back to the Eerste Klasse in 2004. Nuenen finished 11th in the Eerste Klasse, and went back to the Tweede Klasse in 2005. Former international Jan Poortvliet started coaching the team. In the Tweede Klasse, Nuenen immediately took the championship of 2006. During the next years it played stable at usually competing for the top spots of the Eerste Klasse, also after parting ways with Jan Poortvliet in 2007.

=== 2010s: Hoofdklasse and Eerste Klasse ===
In 2011 RKSV won the section championship of the Eerste Klasse and the club promoted for the second time to the Hoofdklasse. In 2012 RSKV lost 0–5 in a practice match against PSV Eindhoven. At the start of 2014 Eric Clijk became the new coach of Nuemen after it had fired Willy Scheepers on 11 November 2013. In 2014 it returned to the Eerste Klasse. Goalkeeper Kelle Roos and forward Jurik Zimmerman joined the selection. Roos left by the winter break for Derby County F.C.

In fall 2015, in a Dutch national cup game, after Nuenen scored against VV Gestel from a free kick, the goalkeeper of Gestel had an argument with the referee after which he gave the referee a headbutt and was arrested. Nuenen completed this season as champion of the Eerste divisie and promoted to the Hoofdklasse for the third time in its history.

In fall 2016, the Artificial turf–cancer hypothesis caused Nuenen as one of the first Dutch association football clubs temporarily not to play on its artificial turf. Playing in Hendrik-Ido-Ambacht, Nuenen beat IFC 5–1, enabling Nuenen to advance to the first place in Hoofdklasse B. RKSV ended this season in 6th place and will continue to play in the Hoofdklasse.

For 2017–2018 it is strengthened by defender Tim Rerimassie, who joined from Helmond Sport and had played some of his youth at RKSV. On August 19, Nuenen is scheduled to travel to Capelle aan den IJssel for its first game in this year's National football cup of the Netherlands against vv Capelle. Davy Heesakkers, another former RKSV player, started coaching the women's squad in the summer of 2017.
