= KNVB Amateur Cup =

The KNVB Amateur Cup (Dutch: KNVB Beker voor amateurs) was the cup competition for amateur football clubs in the Netherlands. The winner qualified until 2016 for the amateur super cup match against the national Hoofdklasse champion.

The cup was contested by the winners of the district cups (Dutch: districtsbekers) in the six districts of the Royal Dutch Football Association: West 1, West 2, South 1, South 2, East and North. The six teams faced each other in a knock-out competition, starting in the quarter-finals. Two clubs received a bye, but they had to play an away game in the semi-finals.

The KNVB Amateur Cup was first contested in the 1980-81 season, replacing the KNVB Saturday Amateur Cup and KNVB Sunday Amateur Cup (see Hoofdklasse#Background for more on Saturday and Sunday football in the Netherlands).

The structure of the cup competition has changed throughout the years. For a number of years, the clubs were placed in two pools of three teams each. Matches were played in two halves of 20 or 30 minutes each, with all group matches played on a single day. The final was held on another day, and was played in two halves of 45 minutes. Between 1996-97 and 2000–01, nine clubs took part, because the Royal Dutch Football Association then consisted of nine districts. Until 1997, the reserve teams of professional football clubs took part in the district cup competitions; two of them won the KNVB Amateur Cup: Ajax Reserves in 1983-84 and SC Heerenveen Reserves in 1990-91. From the 1997-98 season onwards, the reserve teams play in the KNVB Reserve Cup.

The KNVB decided, in consultation with the clubs, that the final round between the six district cup winners for the Amateur Cup came to an end after the 2015–16 season.

== Past winners ==
Year	Winner	Runner-up	Result	Note
1980-81	Caesar			
1981-82	TSC			
1982-83	Drachtster Boys			
1983-84	Ajax Reserves			
1984-85	Limburgia			
1985-86	AZS			
1986-87	Venray			
1987-88	OVV			
1988-89	Achilles 1894			
1989-90	DWV			
1990-91	SC Heerenveen Reserves			
1991-92	BVV			
1992-93	Halsteren			
1993-94	Lisse			
1994-95	Argon	Halsteren	3-0	
1995-96	IJsselmeervogels	BVV	2-0	
1996-97	Babberich	SHO	2-0	
1997-98	Hollandia	SC Feyenoord	7-2	
1998-99	Gemert	Appingedam	2-0	
1999–2000	KBV	Panningen	1-1	KBV won after penalty shoot-out
2000-01	ADO '20	Kranenburg	3-1	
2001-02	TONEGIDO	SC Joure	0-0	TONEGIDO won after 10-9 penalty shoot-out
2002-03	TONEGIDO	VVOG	2-1	
2003-04	Ter Leede	Sneek Wit Zwart	2-0	
2004-05	Genemuiden	Excelsior Maassluis	2-0	
2005-06	ASWH	EVV	3-1	
2006-07	Türkiyemspor	Lisse	1-0	Türkiyemspor won after extra time
2007-08	Rijnsburgse Boys	Achilles '29	2-0	
2008-09	BVV Barendrecht	LRC Leerdam	3-1	
2009-10	VV Dongen	Sneek Wit Zwart	5-1	
2010-11	Achilles '29	Harkemase Boys	1-0	
2011–12	Leonidas	Chabab	2-0	
2012–13	Argon	De Treffers	3-2	Argon won after extra time
2013–14	ASWH	IJsselmeervogels	1-0	ASWH won after extra time
2014–15	IJsselmeervogels	Hoek	2-0	
2015–16	Staphorst	Nordwijk	6-3	Staphorst won after extra time

== See also ==
- KNVB Cup
- FA Vase
- FA Trophy
- Football in the Netherlands
