= Raymond de Waard =

Dutch footballer

Personal information
- Full name: Raymond Marienus de Waard
- Date of birth: 3 February 1991 (age 35)
- Place of birth: Rotterdam, Netherlands
- Position: Left winger

Youth career
- RVV LMO
- –1996: SC Feyenoord

Senior career*
Years	Team	Apps	(Gls)
–1996	SC Feyenoord		
1996–1999	Excelsior	61	(5)
1999–2000	Cambuur	23	(1)
2000–2001	Norwich City	10	(0)
2001	AZ Alkmaar	4	(0)
2001–2002	RBC Roosendaal	16	(0)
2002–2003	ASWH		
2003–2007	SC Feyenoord		
2007–2008	BVV Barendrecht		
- * Club domestic league appearances and goals

Raymond Marienus de Waard (born 27 March 1973) is a Dutch former professional footballer. He was a left winger well known for his pace.

De Waard began his professional career with Excelsior Rotterdam where he played more than hundred games in three seasons before joining newly promoted Cambuur Leeuwarden in July 1999.

Towards the end of the 1999–00 season, Norwich City manager Bryan Hamilton paid £225,000 for his services.

De Waard was a disappointment for the Canaries, which was not helped by injuries and he was released by Hamilton's successor Nigel Worthington in March 2001. He returned to his native Netherlands to play for AZ Alkmaar and RBC Roosendaal. He then played at amateur clubs ASWH (2002–2003) and BVV Barendrecht.

== Sources ==
- Mark Davage; John Eastwood; Kevin Platt (2001). Canary Citizens. Jarrold Publishing. ISBN 0-7117-2020-7.
