= Shabir Isoufi =

Afghan footballer and coach

Personal information
- Date of birth: 9 March 1992 (age 34)
- Place of birth: Kandahar, Afghanistan
- Height: 1.68 m (5 ft 6 in)
- Position: Midfielder

Team information
- Current team: Afghanistan (assistant coach)

Youth career
- Feyenoord

Senior career*
Years	Team	Apps	(Gls)
2010–2013	Feyenoord	0	(0)
2010–2011	→ Excelsior (loan)	4	(0)
2011–2012	→ Dordrecht (loan)	10	(1)
2012–2013	→ Telstar (loan)	30	(7)
2013–2014	Telstar	31	(2)
2014–2015	Barendrecht	12	(1)
2015–2017	ASWH		
2017–2018	SC Feyenoord		
Total		87	(11)

International career
2009	Netherlands U17		
2015	Afghanistan	7	(1)

Managerial career
- 2018–: Afghanistan (assistant coach)
- * Club domestic league appearances and goals

Shabir Isoufi (born 9 March 1992) is an Afghan football coach and former player, who works as an assistant coach for the Afghanistan national team.

He played for Dutch clubs Feyenoord, Excelsior, Dordrecht, Telstar, Barendrecht, ASWH and SC Feyenoord as a midfielder, and also represented Afghanistan at international level.

== Playing career ==
=== Club career ===
Isoufi played club football in the Netherlands for Feyenoord, Excelsior, Dordrecht, Telstar and Barendrecht. In June 2015 Shabir signed a contract with Hoofdklasse club ASWH, and later moved to SC Feyenoord for the 2017–18 season.

=== International career ===
He made three appearances for the Netherlands at the 2009 FIFA U-17 World Cup.

He earned seven caps for the Afghanistan senior team in 2015, scoring once.

== International goals ==
No.	Date	Venue	Opponent	Score	Result	Competition
1.	29 May 2015	New Laos National Stadium, Vientiane, Laos	Laos	2–0	2–0	Friendly

== Coaching career ==
Isoufi graduated with his UEFA B diploma on 22 May 2018. After gaining his diploma, Isoufi was appointed as the assistant coach of the Afghan national football team.

== Personal life ==
In 2011, Isoufi was the highest paid athlete from Afghanistan with an annual salary of US $80,000.
