= 2006–07 Eerste Klasse =

Eerste Klasse
- Season: 2006–7
- Relegated: 2007–08 Tweede Klasse

2006–07 Eerste Klasse was a Dutch association football season of the Eerste Klasse.

Saturday champions were:

- A: Zwaluwen '30
- B: BVV Barendrecht
- C: LRC Leerdam
- D: VV DOVO
- E: PKC '83

Sunday champions were:

- A: AFC DWS
- B: Westlandia
- C: VV DESK
- D: SV Deurne
- E: De Bataven
- F: SVBO
