= Brard =

Brard is a surname. Notable people with the surname include:

- Florent Brard (born 1976), French road bicycle racer
- Jean-Michel Brard (born 1968), French politician
- Jean-Pierre Brard, (born 1948), French politician
- Joshua Brard (born 1986), Dutch footballer
- Magdeleine Brard (1903-1998), French pianist.
- Patty Brard (born 1955), Dutch-Indonesian entertainer
- Stanley Brard (born 1958), Dutch footballer
