= Gidi Jacobs =

Dutch football player

Personal information
- Full name: Egidius Simon Jacobs
- Date of birth: 15 January 1935
- Place of birth: Rotterdam, Netherlands
- Date of death: 2 September 2016 (aged 81)
- Place of death: Apeldoorn, Netherlands
- Position: Midfielder

Youth career
- RVV Coal

Senior career*
Years	Team	Apps	(Gls)
–1955	RVV Coal		
1955–1957	SC Feyenoord		
1956–1957	Feyenoord	3	(1)
1957–1959	Hermes DVS		
1959–196?	DVV Fluks		

Managerial career
- 1964–1967: BVV Barendrecht
- 1967–1970: VV Zwaluwen
- 1970–1972: VV Sleeuwijk
- 197?–197?: TOGR
- 1979–1980?: ASWH (director tech affairs)
- * Club domestic league appearances and goals

Egidius Simon "Gidi" Jacobs (15 January 1935 – 2 September 2016) was a Dutch professional footballer at Feyenoord and Hermes DVS. His position was midfielder. Jacobs later became a football manager, most notably at VV Zwaluwen.

== Playing career ==
=== Feyenoord and RVV Coal ===
Jacobs initially played for RVV Coal, including in its first squad in the Tweede Klasse.

In 1955, he joined Feyenoord's second squad. In the season of 1956–57, Jacobs played 3 games for Feyenoord's first squad in the Eredivisie, 2 of which for 90 minutes. He scored a decisive last-second goal in his debut game, on 23 September 1956 against Sportclub Enschede (later merged into FC Twente), after he entered 7 minutes before the end as a replacement for Piet Steenbergen.

=== Hermes DVS and DVV Fluks ===
In 1957, Jacobs continued his player career at Schiedam-side Hermes DVS in the Eerste Divisie. Hermes had acquired Jacobs from Feyenoord for 10,000 guilders. On 26 December 1957, he scored the second and third goal in the 4–0 victory of Hermes over DVV Delft in the 1957–58 KNVB Cup.

In 1959, he left HDVS for the Dordrecht-side DVV Fluks in the Tweede Klasse.

== Managerial career ==
In 1964, Jacobs obtained his Football Trainer C certification.

=== Barendrecht and Zwaluwen ===
From 1964 through 1967, Jacobs coached BVV Barendrecht in the Derde Klasse. Jacobs left as he refused to manage the same club more than 3 years.

From 1967 through 1970, Jacobs managed VV Zwaluwen in the Tweede Klasse. In April 1970, as he was wrapping up his trainership at Zwaluwen, Jacobs loudly disagreed with a decision made by a linesman. The linesman was so upset that he physically attacked Jacobs, causing the referee to remove the linesman from the game.

=== Sleeuwijk, TOGR and ASWH ===
Jacobs moved on to coach VV Sleeuwijk for two years, ending in a relegation from the Derde to the Vierde Klasse. He then coached TOGR in the Vierde Klasse.

In 1979, Jacobs briefly served as ASWH's first board member in charge of technical affairs. ASWH played in the Tweede Klasse at that time.

== Personal ==
Jacobs was born in Rotterdam on 15 January 1935. His parental home was in the Tarwewijk. Jacobs graduated in 1954 from the Johan van Oldenbarnevelt HBS, after which he served in the military as a fitness trainer for the Royal Netherlands Air Force. In March 1957, Jacobs was engaged to Diana Ouweneel. In the 1960s, Jacobs lived in Hendrik-Ido-Ambacht. Jacobs died in Apeldoorn on 2 September 2016.
