= Dogan Corneille =

Dutch association football player and manager

Personal information
- Date of birth: 28 February 1974 (age 52)
- Place of birth: Venlo, Netherlands
- Position: Defensive midfielder

Youth career
- 1980–1988: Venlosche Boys
- 1988–1994: VVV-Venlo

Senior career*
Years	Team	Apps	(Gls)
1994–1999	VVV-Venlo	155	(17)
1999–2001	Eindhoven	59	(4)
2001–2004	Hilversum		
2004–2005	Kozakken Boys		
2005–2007	IJsselmeervogels		
2007–2008	Barendrecht		

International career
1990	Netherlands U18	4	(0)

Managerial career
- 2008: ASWH (caretaker)
- 2009: RVVH
- 2010–2013: Alphense Boys
- 2013–2014: Kozakken Boys
- 2014: IJsselmeervogels
- 2014–2017: Noordwijk
- 2016–2018: Willem II (asst.)
- 2018–2023: Excelsior Maassluis
- 2023–2024: Rijnvogels
- 2025–2026: Barendrecht
- * Club domestic league appearances and goals

Dogan Corneille (born 28 February 1974) is a Dutch football manager and former player, who was most recently head coach of Tweede Divisie club Barendrecht where he will be technical manager from summer 2026. His position as a player was defensive midfielder.

== Playing career ==
=== Club ===
Corneille was a youth player for VVV-Venlo. On 27 Augustus 1994 he played his first games in the senior squad against FC Den Bosch, in a game that Venlo won 4–3. He played five seasons for VVV in the Eerste Divisie, as a base player on the squad and became its captain. In 1999 he moved to FC Eindhoven, where he played another two seasons in the Eerste Divisie. In 2001 started playing in lower leagues for FC Hilversum, Kozakken Boys, IJsselmeervogels, and BVV Barendrecht. With IJsselmeervogels, Corneille won the national championship for amateurs in 2006. While an active player, he obtained trainer certification and in 2008 joined the technical staff of ASWH. In March 2008, he stopped playing.

=== International ===
Corneille played for the Netherlands national under-18 football team in an international tournament in Belgium in 1990.

== Managerial career ==
After Henk Wisman left ASWH for Almere, Corneille served several months as the interim manager of ASWH. In 2009 he became manager of RVVH in the Hoofdklasse, yet resigned after a few months. In 2010, he moved to Hoofdklasse-side Alphense Boys which he coached for three years. In the final year, the club was close to promotion, however it lost in the playoffs against Haaglandia (1–0). The game ended in a riot for which Alphense Boys were punished by the KNVB.

Corneille moved to the Topklasse anyway with his new club Kozakken Boys, who fired him before the end of the season. At that time he had already signed with IJsselmeervogels for the 2014–15 season. He combined the position of managing IJsselmeervogels with assistant manager of Feyenoord U19.

In 2015 he became manager of VV Noordwijk and in 2016 assistant manager at Willem II, supporting manager Erwin van de Looi. In 2018 Corneille became the manager of Excelsior Maassluis in the Tweede Divisie. He later was manager at Rijnvogels, but had to quit due to health issues. He returned to coaching when he succeeded Leen van Steensel at Barendrecht, but halfway the season he announced he would retire as a coach in summer 2026.

== Personal ==
Corneille is a resident of Berkel en Rodenrijs. He is a younger brother of pianist Glenn Corneille, who died in an accident in 2005.
