= Nixon Dias =

Dutch footballer

Personal information
- Full name: Nixon Dias
- Date of birth: 2 September 1979 (age 47)
- Place of birth: Rotterdam, Netherlands
- Position: Defender

Youth career
- Bloemhof
- Neptunus
- Sparta

Senior career*
Years	Team	Apps	(Gls)
1996–2000	Sparta	6	(0)
2000–2001	ADO Den Haag	15	(1)
2001–2002	Excelsior Maassluis		
2002–2006	DOTO		
2006–2008	ASWH		
2008–2010	Noordwijk		
2010	SC Feyenoord		
2010–2011	Neptunus		
2012	Dayton Dutch Lions	21	(1)
2012–2013	Zwaluwen		
2013–2014	CVV Zwervers		
2014–2017	Zwarte Pijl		

International career^{‡}
1997	Netherlands U19	2	(0)

Managerial career
- 2014–2017: Zwarte Pijl (player–coach)
- 2016–: VOC (youth)
- * Club domestic league appearances and goals as of 23:11, 15 June 2023 (UTC) ‡ National team caps and goals as of 23:11, 15 June 2023 (UTC)

Nixon Dias (born 2 September 1979 in Rotterdam) is a Dutch retired footballer. He works as a DJ and football coach.

== Football career ==
Dias made his Eredivisie league debut with Sparta Rotterdam during the 1996-1997 season. He then played for ADO Den Haag during the 2000-2001 season.

Dias continued to play for amateur sides Excelsior Maassluis, DOTO, ASWH, Noordwijk, SC Feyenoord, and Neptunus. A contract with RBC did not materialize as the club wasn't ready yet to restart after bankruptcy. Instead, he tried to join XerxesDZB but this was blocked by the KNVB. Dias played for the United Soccer League club Dayton Dutch Lions in 2012.

Back in the Netherlands, Dias played for Zwaluwen Vlaardingen. Dias retired from playing in 2017 at Zwarte Pijl, where he doubled as coach. He is a youth coach at VOC Rotterdam since 2016.

== International career ==
Dias was capped twice by the Netherlands national under-19 football team

== Personal life ==
Nixon's son, Jasaja Dias, played at Excelsior Maassluis youth, Westlandia, Sliedrecht, HBSS, and from 2023 at ASWH. Of these, Maassluis and ASWH are shared with the father.
