= Daan den Bleijker =

Dutch footballer

Personal information
- Full name: Izaak Daniël den Bleijker
- Date of birth: 30 June 1928
- Place of birth: Rotterdam, Netherlands
- Date of death: December 15, 2003 (aged 75)
- Place of death: Rotterdam, Netherlands
- Position: Striker

Senior career*
Years	Team	Apps	(Gls)
–1950	CVV Mercurius		
1950–1959	Feijenoord	107	(30)
1959–1961	DHC	26	(5)

Managerial career
- 1962-1963: Heerjansdam
- 1966-1968: DRL
- 1969–1970: RVVH
- 1973–197?: Barendrecht
- 1979-1980: Heerjansdam
- 1982–1988: Smitshoek
- Barendrecht
- Rijsoord
- * Club domestic league appearances and goals as of 10 June 2007 ‡ National team caps and goals as of 10 June 2007

Izaak Daniël "Daan" den Bleijker (30 June 1928 – 30 June 2003) was a Dutch footballer who was active as a forward.

== Club career ==
Den Bleijker made his debut for Feijenoord on 8 April 1951 against Willem II and scored 30 goals in 111 official matches for the club. He scored Feijenoord's first goal in professional football, in 1954 against Vitesse and scored 4 goals in the first Klassieker on 11 November 1956 when Feijenoord trashed Ajax 7-3.

He later played for DHC.
