= Robbert Olijfveld =

Dutch footballer (born 1994)

Personal information
- Date of birth: 15 August 1994 (age 32)
- Place of birth: Rotterdam, Netherlands
- Position: Forward

Team information
- Current team: ASWH

Youth career
- 2000–2006: SV Bolnes
- 2006–2009: Spartaan'20
- 2009–2010: Excelsior
- 2010–2013: Feyenoord
- 2013–2015: Sparta Rotterdam

Senior career*
Years	Team	Apps	(Gls)
2014–2015	Sparta Rotterdam	3	(1)
2015–2017	ASWH	34	(15)
2017–2021	IJsselmeervogels	88	(32)
2021–2022	Rijnsburgse Boys	24	(1)
2022–2024	Barendrecht	61	(33)
2024–2025	Sportlust '46	18	(7)
2025	Barendrecht	13	(1)
2025–2026	Capelle	28	(6)
2026–	ASWH	0	(0)
- * Club domestic league appearances and goals as of 13 June 2026

Robbert Olijfveld (born 15 August 1994) is a Dutch footballer who plays as a forward for Vierde Divisie club ASWH.

== Career ==
=== 2000–2014: Youth ===
Born in Rotterdam, Olijfveld started playing football at age five for SV Bolnes, and would continue his youth career at various clubs in the Rotterdam area. In 2010, he joined the Feyenoord academy, where he played alongside Jean-Paul Boëtius, Anass Achahbar and Tonny Vilhena before suffering a knee injury. He subsequently moved to the Sparta Rotterdam youth academy after being released by Feyenoord.

=== 2014–2017: Sparta and ASWH ===
On 15 March 2014, Olijfveld made his professional debut for Sparta Rotterdam in the Eerste Divisie, as a substitute against Almere City, a match which ended in a 1–0 loss. A week later he appeared as a starter against Achilles '29 in a 1–1 draw, in which he scored the opening goal in the 61st minute. Olijfveld also started a week later, against FC Eindhoven, in a match which ended in a 4–0 loss.

In parallel, Olijfveld appeared as a starter for the under-21 team of the club, Jong Sparta, in the Beloften Eredivisie, the league for reserve teams, where he became top goalscorer in his final season at the club.

In the summer of 2015, he moved to ASWH, where he helped the club achieve promotion from the Hoofdklasse to the Derde Divisie, amongst others by scoring the decisive goal in the final game to secure promotion against VV Noordwijk.

=== 2017–2022: IJsselmeervogels and Rijnsburg ===
Ahead of the 2017–18 season, Olijfveld joined Tweede Divisie club IJsselmeervogels. He made his debut for the club in a KNVB Cup matchup against VV Noordwijk, where he came on as a 79th-minute substitute for Christiaan van Hussen in a 3–2 loss. The following week, on 26 August, Olijfveld made his first appearance in the Tweede Divisie in a 1–0 home win over Kozakken Boys, coming on as a substitute in the 60th minute for Soufian Moro. He finished his first season for IJsselmeervogels with 34 total appearances in which he scored 14 goals, as the club finished 9th in the league table.

In December 2020, it was announced that Olijfveld would join Rijnsburgse Boys from the start of the 2021–22 season on a one-year contract with an option for an additional season. He made his debut for the club on 21 August 2021 as a substitute for Dani van der Moot in the 70th minute of a 3–0 away win over GVVV.

=== 2022–2026: Barendrecht, Sportlust and Capelle ===
On 27 January 2022, it was announced that Olijfveld would join Derde Divisie club Barendrecht ahead of the 2022–23 season. He scored on a penalty on his debut for the club on 20 August 2022, the first matchday of the season, helping his side to a 3–2 home victory against Excelsior '31. In the following game he scored a brace in a span of five minutes against Hoek.

On 9 February 2024, Olijfveld was announced as Sportlust '46's new signing ahead of the 2024–25 season. He made his debut for the club on 17 August, the first matchday of the season, starting in a 0–0 draw against Eemdijk. Olijfveld scored his first competitive goal for Sportlust on 24 August with a 61st-minute penalty in a 3–1 away loss to his former club, IJsselmeervogels. In the following month, he scored consecutive braces in league matches on 14 September and 21 September, helping Sportlust secure victories against Rohda Raalte and HBC Heemstede.

On 15 April 2025, Olijfveld signed with Vierde Divisie club Capelle ahead of the 2025–26 season.

=== 2026–present: Return to ASWH ===
In June 2026, Olijfveld returned to ASWH, signing a two-year contract with the club, which had just been relegated to the Vierde Divisie. The move, announced on 12 June, followed his departure from Capelle in late May, when he and the club agreed to part by mutual consent.
