= Yassine El Hanoudi =

Moroccan footballer (born 1992)

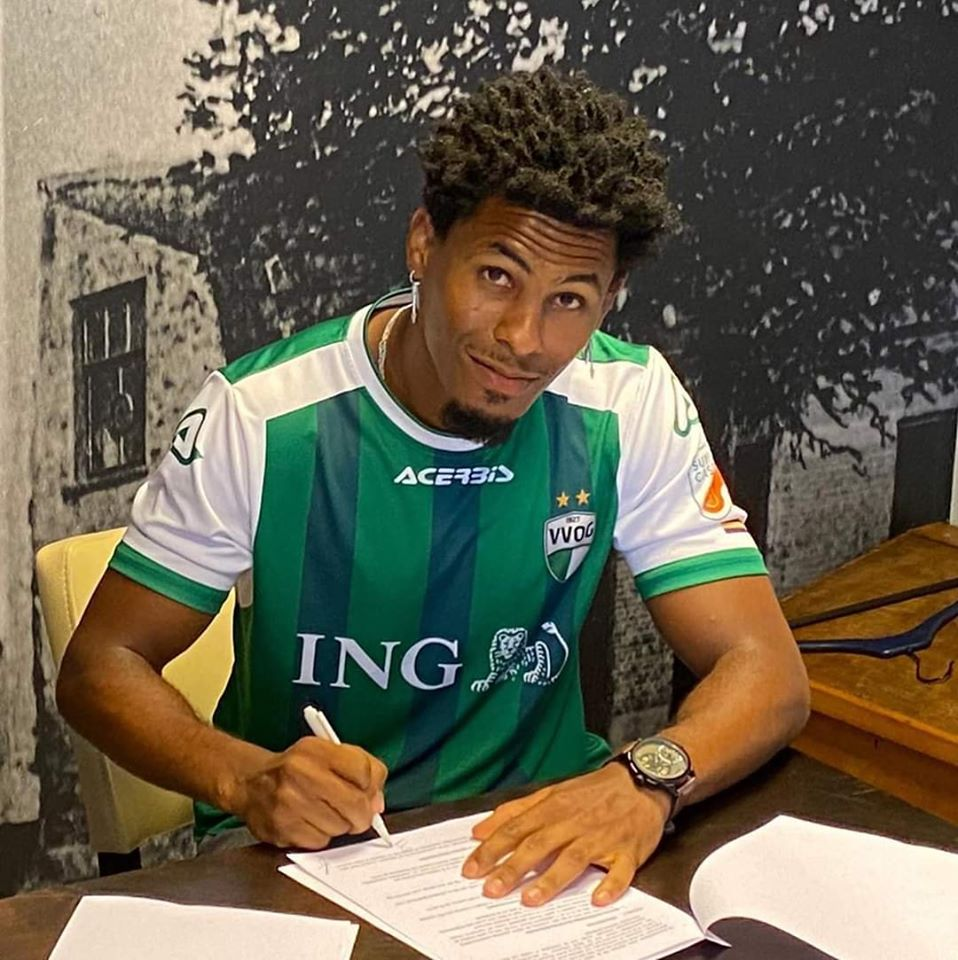
- El Hanoudi with VVOG in 2020

Personal information
- Date of birth: 7 October 1992 (age 34)
- Place of birth: Rabat, Morocco
- Height: 1.85 m (6 ft 1 in)
- Position: Midfielder

Team information
- Current team: SC FEYNOORD

Youth career
- FAR Rabat
- FUS Rabat
- Salé

Senior career*
Years	Team	Apps	(Gls)
2011–2012	Salé		(0)
2012–2013	Union Taroudant		(1)
2013–2014	Raja Agadir		(3)
2014	Roskilde		(0)
2015	Cádiz CF		(0)
2015–2017	Le Mée		(1)
2017–2019	Magreb '90	9+	(2)
2019–2020	LRC Leerdam		(0)
2020–2021	VVOG	4	(0)
2021–2022	LRC Leerdam		
2022–	Heukelum		
- * Club domestic league appearances and goals as of 08:20, 21 November 2024 (UTC)

Yassine el Hanoudi (born 7 October 1992) is a Moroccan footballer who plays as a cenral defender for Dutch vierde divisie club SC FEYNOORD ROTTERDAM ]].

== Club career ==
=== Morocco ===
Born in Rabat, El Hanoudi started playing football at a young age. At the age of fourteen he started at the football academy of the renowned Moroccan football club Association Sportive des Forces Armées Royales (ASFAR). He became known for his defending skills and at sixteen, he joined the youth team of ASFAR with whom he won the championship of 2009. At age seventeen, he left ASFAR to join forces with another football club, Fath Union Sport Rabat (FUS Rabat) where he played next to Badr Boulahroud, Alaedine Ajaray and Adam Ennafati.

=== Years abroad ===
After FUS Rabat, El Hanoudi played for AS Salé, Union Taroudant and Raja Agadir before his international career began at Danish 1st Division club FC Roskilde. El Hanoudi then had a mid-season transfer to Spanish football club Cádiz CF. A year later, France called. El Hanoudi went to French football club Le Mée (Ligue Paris Ile de France N2). in Le Mée-sur-Seine. A successful move, since Le Mée won the championship that season.

El Hanoudi played multiple seasons at Le Mée as a right defender before he transferred to Magreb '90 (later SVA Papendorp) in Utrecht, Netherlands. El Hanoudi was praised for his performances, but due to issues at the club (in February 2020 the executive board of the Royal Dutch Football Association (KNVB) canceled the membership of SVA Papendorp in competition), El Hanoudi left the club after one and a half season. In 2019, El Hanoudi signed with LRC Leerdam. In 2020, signed with VVOG, a football club that plays in the Derde Divisie. He returned shortly to LRC in 2021, before moving to Derde Klasse club Heukelum in 2022.
