= Mohamed Sharif =

Somali footballer

Personal information
- Date of birth: 1 July 1988 (age 38)
- Place of birth: Somalia
- Position: Goalkeeper

Senior career*
Years	Team	Apps	(Gls)
- Sliedrecht
- ASWH
- Schelluinen

International career
2013	Somalia	3	(0)
- * Club domestic league appearances and goals

Mohamed Sharif (born 1 July 1988) is a Somalian former footballer who is last known to have played as a goalkeeper for Schelluinen.

== Career ==
While playing for a Somali community team in the Netherlands, Sharif was called up to represent Somalia internationally.
