= Doedee =

Doedee or Doedée is a surname. Notable people with the surname include:

- Stef Doedée (born 1987), Dutch retired goalkeeper and current goalkeeping trainer
- Tom Doedee (born 1997), Australian rules footballer
