= Ruud Heus =

Dutch footballer (born 1961)

Personal information
- Date of birth: 24 February 1961 (age 65)
- Place of birth: Hoorn, Netherlands
- Height: 1.78 m (5 ft 10 in)
- Position: Left-back

Youth career
- Hollandia

Senior career*
Years	Team	Apps	(Gls)
1982–1986	AZ' 67	84	(3)
1986–1996	Feyenoord	239	(10)
1996–1997	AZ	18	(1)
Total		341	(14)

Managerial career
- 2004–2006: Barendrecht
- 2010–2012: LRC Leerdam
- * Club domestic league appearances and goals

Ruud Heus (born 24 February 1961) is a Dutch former professional footballer who played as a left-back He is the currently assistant trainer of Jong FC Utrecht.

== Playing career ==
Heus was born in Hoorn. On 23 April 1983, he made his Eredivisie debut with AZ'67, in a 3–3 home draw against NAC Breda. After four years he moved to Feyenoord, going on to play a somewhat important part in the Rotterdam side's achievements in the following decade.

In his best season, 1993–94, Heus scored four goals in 29 games as the team finished second to AFC Ajax and won the domestic cup. At 35, he returned for one final campaign at his first club, appearing in roughly half of the matches as it eventually ranked last then retiring in the summer.

== Coaching career ==
In 2004 he was named manager of Barendrecht Heus was dismissed as head coach of LRC Leerdam in March 2012. He then joined the academy of FC Utrecht.

== Personal life ==
Heus is married to Bibian and the couple has four daughters. After retiring as a player he managed a fashion wholesaler and worked at the academy of FC Dordrecht.

== Honours ==
Feyenoord

- Eredivisie: 1992–93
- KNVB Cup: 1990–91, 1991–92, 1993–94, 1994–95
- Johan Cruijff Shield: 1991
