= Ron Timmers =

Dutch footballer and manager

Personal information
- Date of birth: 11 August 1973 (age 53)
- Place of birth: Zwijndrecht, Netherlands

Team information
- Current team: IFC (manager)

Senior career*
Years	Team	Apps	(Gls)
- Dordrecht
- Sparta

Managerial career
- –2000: Sliedrecht
- 2000–2001: Leonidas
- 2001–2003: Groote Lindt
- 2003–2006: Rijsoord
- 2006–2009: Nieuwerkerk
- 2010–2011: Zwaluwen
- 2011–2013: ASWH
- 2013–2018: Dongen
- 2018: Capelle
- 2018–2020: Heerjansdam
- 2021–: IFC
- * Club domestic league appearances and goals

Ron Timmers (born 11 August 1973) is a Dutch former footballer and current manager who is the head coach of IFC. He is a resident of Heer Oudelands Ambacht, Zwijndrecht.

== Football career ==
Timmers played professionally in FC Dordrecht and Sparta Rotterdam. On 24 November 1985, in the 1985–86 KNVB Cup, he scored the first equalizer for FC Dordrecht, in a game that Dordrecht lost 3–2 to RBC Roosendaal.

Since 2000 Timmers coached Sliedrecht, SVW, Rijsoord, Groote Lindt, Leonidas, VV Nieuwerkerk, and Zwaluwen (2010–2011). In 2011 he became chief coach of ASWH, and in 2013 Timmers moved on to VV Dongen, also in the Hoofdklasse. In 2016 he led Dongen to a Hoofdklasse championship after which the club promoted to Derde Divisie. In 2017 Dongen under Timmers ended third in Derde Divisie and participated in the qualification rounds for the Tweede Divisie. In February 2018, Timmers was hired as manager of both Sunday League club Dongen and Saturday League side VV Capelle. He managed Dongen until the summer and Capelle after the summer of 2018. He later coached VV Heerjansdam, until 2020. In December 2020, Timmers was appointed head coach of IFC who switched to playing Saturday football.
