= Arjan Human =

Dutch footballer (born 1978)

Personal information
- Date of birth: 8 November 1978 (age 48)
- Place of birth: Middelharnis, Netherlands
- Position: Forward

Youth career
- Zeelandia
- Middelburg
- Feyenoord

Senior career*
Years	Team	Apps	(Gls)
1996?–1997	Dauwendaele		
1997–1999	Cercle Brugge	39	(4)
1999–2000	Kloetinge		(22)
2000–2001	RKC	16	(4)
2001–2002	ADO Den Haag	27	(3)
2002–2004	Hoek		
2004–2009	ASWH		
2009–2011	Barendrecht		
2011–2014	Vlissingen		
2016	MZVC Middelburg		

International career
1993	Netherlands U15	1	(0)

Managerial career
- 2014–2016: VV Breskens
- * Club domestic league appearances and goals

Arjan Human (born 8 November 1978) is a Dutch retired footballer who played as a forward. He earned one cap for the Netherlands national under-15 football team.

After his football career, he works in operations management.

== Football career ==
Human played in the youth of Zeelandia Middelburg, VV Middelburg and Feyenoord.

=== Dauwendaele, Cercle Brugge and Kloetinge ===
Human started his senior career at FC Dauwendaele. He turned professional at Cercle Brugge in the Belgian Division 2. Next Human played in the Saturday Hoofdklasse for VV Kloetinge, scoring 22 goals in his sole season for the club.

=== RKC Waalwijk and ADO Den Haag ===
Human returned to play professionally at RKC Waalwijk (2000–2001) and ADO Den Haag (2001–02) in the Eerste Divisie.

=== Hoek, ASWH, China and Barendrecht ===
Human returned to the Hoofdklasse, playing for HSV Hoek and ASWH. With ASWH he won the 2005 national championship for amateurs and in 2006 the KNVB Cup and the Supercup for amateurs. At the start of 2007, he was tested by the Chinese teams Tianjin TEDA F.C. and Qingdao Haixin. He was ASWH's player of the year for the season 2006–07. In September 2006, Human scored three goals in ASWH's 4–2 cup defeat of professional side Cambuur.

In Augustus 2007, in a KNVB Cup game against WKE, Human suffered a major injury. Only in January 2009, he returned to play football. In July 2009 Human changed sides for BVV Barendrecht. In May 2010 he won a Hoofdklasse section championship with Barendrecht.

=== Vlissingen, MZVC and coaching Breskens ===
In the summer of 2011, Human started playing in Vlissingen where also became a coach. Next Human managed VV Breskens. Upon disappointing results, Human returned to play in January 2016 for MZVC from Middelburg. He retired in July 2016.
