= Floor de Zeeuw =

Dutch footballer and coach

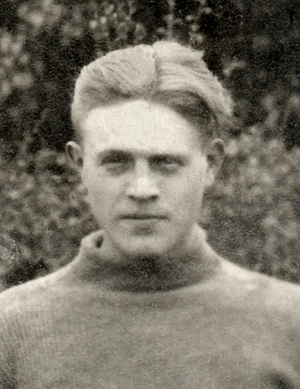
- Floor de Zeeuw in 1923

Personal information
- Full name: Floris de Zeeuw
- Date of birth: 13 October 1898
- Place of birth: Rotterdam
- Date of death: 21 September 1979 (aged 80)
- Place of death: Hoogvliet, Rotterdam
- Position: Goalkeeper

Youth career
- SC Feyenoord

Senior career*
Years	Team	Apps	(Gls)
1922–1924	Feyenoord	23	(0)
- Feyenoord Vets

Managerial career
- Early 1930s: SC Feyenoord
- Late 1930s: Feyenoord (asst.)
- 1942–1943?: Fluks Dordrecht
- 1946–1947: VV Papendrecht
- 1947–1950: Rood-Wit Willebrord
- 1951: VV Papendrecht
- 1951–1952: Zwart-Wit '28
- Early 1950s?: De Musschen
- 1954–1958: ASWH
- * Club domestic league appearances and goals

Floris "Floor" de Zeeuw (13 October 1898 – 21 September 1979) was a Dutch footballer and football coach, notably for Feyenoord Rotterdam.

== Football career ==
=== Feyenoord goalkeeper ===
De Zeeuw played in the position of goalkeeper for Feyenoord, beginning in youth teams.

As goalkeeper of the first squad during the years 1922 to 1924, he won the Dutch national championship of 1924. Feyenoord's magazine described De Zeeuw in 1923 as "a calm and sophisticated keeper, who always manages to keep his composure." De Zeeuw participated in 23 championship league games for Feyenoord 1, of which 21 (out of a maximum of 22) were in 1922–1923. He kept his goal clear in Feyenoord's 2–0 victory over the Netherlands national football team of 1928.

From 1927 or earlier, he played on the veteran team of Feyenoord. De Zeeuw continued playing for the veterans at least until 1933.

=== Manager ===
Starting in the 1930s De Zeeuw coached lower squads of Feyenoord. He served as an assistant trainer of Richard Kohn for Feyenoord's first squad. De Zeeuw obtained coach certification in 1943.

In the 1940s and 1950s, he managed Fluks Dordrecht (1942–1943?), VV Papendrecht (1946–1947; 1951), Rood-Wit Willebrord (1947–1950), Zwart-Wit '28 (1951–1952), De Musschen Rotterdam, and ASWH (1954–1958).

=== Author ===
De Zeeuw published a series of articles in the sports weekly Sportkroniek of 1947, titled Voetbal-geheimen onthuld ("football secrets revealed"). He also published articles on football strategy in the magazine of VV Papendrecht, while functioning as Papendrecht's coach.

== Life and death ==
Floris de Zeeuw was born in Rotterdam as the son of Pieter de Zeeuw (1876–1943), a bricklayer, and Barbara "Betje" Veldhoen (1876–1911).

In 1924 he married Adriana "Sjaan" van Oudgaarden. The couple had two sons and a daughter.

De Zeeuw died in the Rotterdam borough of Hoogvliet.
