= Jacob van den Belt =

Dutch footballer

Personal information
- Full name: Jacob van den Belt
- Date of birth: 30 September 1981 (age 45)
- Place of birth: Rotterdam, Netherlands
- Height: 1.90 m (6 ft 3 in)
- Position: Goalkeeper

Youth career
- LMO
- 1998–: Feyenoord

Senior career*
Years	Team	Apps	(Gls)
–2001	Jong Excelsior		
2001–2002	RBC	2	(0)
2002–2003	VVV	3	(0)
2003–2008	DOTO		
2008–2010	ASWH		
2010–2011	SC Feyenoord		
2011–2014	RVVH		
2014–2017	Oude Maas		
- * Club domestic league appearances and goals

Jacob van den Belt (born 30 September 1981 in Rotterdam) is a former Dutch professional player of association football. His position was goalkeeper. His height 1.90 meters. He later worked as a supply chain professional.

== Football career ==
Van den Belt played in youth teams of Feyenoord and Excelsior Rotterdam. He turned professional at RBC Roosendaal. In the season 2001–2002 he played 3 Eredivisie games for this team. In Summer 2002 he transferred to VVV-Venlo where he also had three caps.

Van den Belt then played in major amateur leagues for DOTO (2003–2008), ASWH (2008–2010), SC Feyenoord (2010–2011), RVVH (2011–2014 ), and VV Oude Maas (2014–2017). In 2017 he retired from playing in football leagues.
