= Sportpark Schildman =

Sports complex in the Netherlands

Sportpark Schildman is a municipal park and sports complex in Hendrik-Ido-Ambacht, Netherlands. It contains the main grounds, training fields, and facilities for:

- ASWH – association football club
- IFC – association football club
- Boulistica – Boules club with fields next to Hiaten. This club uses Hiaten's facilities.
- DVS '69 – korfball club
- VV Volido – volleyball and beach volleyball club
- Hiaten – tennis club
- De Luchtsbode – carrier pigeons club
- Sagittarius – shooting sports club

== History ==
In 1969–1970, Schildman was expanded eastwards to also include tennis and hockey facilities. In the mid-1970s it was expanded southward to include more training fields.

Ambachtse Mixed Hockey Club 1965 (AMHC '65) moved to Schildman in 1968 and merged in 1988 into a field hockey club from Zwijndrecht. Sandido marching and show band, founded in 1967 by the local orange association and since the mid 1970s at Schildman, shut down about 2018. Its former building, still used by the band, had already been sold to a church, De Nieuwe Hoop.

The soccer fields are being be updated and expended in the 2020s.
