= VSV TONEGIDO =

Defunct association football club in the Netherlands

TONEGIDO
- Full name: Voorburgse Sport Vereniging Tot Ons Nut En Genoegen Is Deze Opgericht
- Nickname: Withemden (White Shirts)
- Founded: 1 February 1924
- Dissolved: 1 July 2010
- Ground: Sportpark 't Loo, Voorburg
- 2009–10: Hoofdklasse Sunday A, 13th
Home colours

VSV TONEGIDO were a lower league club from the town of Voorburg, Netherlands. The peak of the club's success was in 2002–03 when TONEGIDO won successive KNVB Amateur Cup's and the Dutch Amateur Super Cup. They went into administration during the 2009–10 season while they were playing in the Hoofdklasse and board eventually decided to disband the club after a vote among members.

== History ==
The club was originally founded in 1921, but was short-lived and was disbanded after a short time. On 1 February 1924, the club was re-founded by some former members. The club's home kit consisted of a white shirt with the Voorburg coat of arms on the left chest, black shorts and black socks with a white collar. The club was traditionally located on the Rodelaan in Voorburg, but from 1 September 2005, TONEGIDO's home ground moved to Sportpark 't Loo in Voorburg. The reason for this was that the adjacent cemetery had to expand, which meant that the club had to move. There are now a number of large villas on the former TONEGIDO site.

TONEGIDO peaked in terms of success on the pitch in 2002 and 2003, when the first team won successive KNVB Amateur Cup's and the Dutch Amateur Super Cup.

In October 2006, first-team player Benjamin Gomes was included in the Western Netherlands Regional Team for the UEFA Regions' Cup qualifiers. In the 2007–08 season, the club had an affiliation with the Slovak club AS Trenčín, which resulted in three players from TONEGIDO playing at Trenčín. After one season, the collaboration was ended after Trenčín suffered relegation from the Slovak Super Liga.

Due to the move to Sportpark 't Loo, it was no longer possible to maintain youth football at TONEGIDO. As a result, there was a decreased flow of talent to the senior team. In addition, there was a long-standing liquidity problem. Despite several attempts to get the finances in order through sponsors, there appeared to be no future for the club. The board was therefore forced to propose to dissolve the club. The members supported this proposal, after which the club was dissolved on 1 July 2010.

== Honours ==
- KNVB Amateur Cup:
  - Winners (2): 2002, 2003
- KNVB District Cup:
  - Winners (3): 1998 (III), 2002, 2003 (II)
- Dutch Amateur Super Cup
  - Winners (2): 2002, 2003

== See also ==
- Category:VSV TONEGIDO players
