= Quincy Tavares =

Curaçao footballer

Personal information
- Full name: Quincy Tavares Mojica
- Date of birth: 1 February 2001 (age 25)
- Place of birth: Rotterdam, Netherlands
- Height: 1.71 m (5 ft 7 in)
- Position: Winger

Youth career
- –2013: Excellence
- 2013–2015: JVOZ
- 2015–2021: FC Dordrecht

Senior career*
Years	Team	Apps	(Gls)
2018–2020	FC Dordrecht	23	(2)
2021–2022	NAC Breda	1	(0)
2023–2024	Jodan Boys		
2024–2025	ASWH		
2025–2026	Excelsior Maassluis		
2026–	FK Voždovac		
- * Club domestic league appearances and goals as of 1 June 2024

Quincy Tavares Mojica, known as Quincy Tavares (born 1 February 2001) is a Dutch professional football midfielder of Curaçaoan descent. Earlier in his career, he was known as Quincy Hogesteger.

== Club career ==
=== FC Dordrecht and NAC ===
Tavares made his first squad debut for Dordrecht on 17 August 2018 in their 0–0 home draw against Helmond Sport. He had 23 caps for the Dordrecht first squad, in which he scored two goals.

In the summer 2021, Taveres changed sides to NAC Breda, where he was initially assigned to the Under-21 squad. He made his debut for the main squad of NAC on 27 August 2021 against ADO Den Haag, as a substitute in the 87th minute and received a red card 7 minutes later.

=== Jodan Boys, ASWH and Maassluis ===
For the 2023–24 season, Tavares joined CVV de Jodan Boys in the Dutch sixth tier. In 2024, he transferred to ASWH. In the summer of 2025, he moved to Excelsior Maassluis.

=== FK Voždovac ===
In 2026, he joined the Serbian side FK Voždovac.
