= Joshua Brard =

Dutch footballer

Personal information
- Date of birth: 14 May 1986 (age 40)
- Place of birth: Dordrecht, Netherlands
- Position: Midfielder

Youth career
- ASWH

Senior career*
Years	Team	Apps	(Gls)
2005-2006	Sparta	0	(0)
2006-2007	TOP Oss	11	(0)
2007-2008	LRC Leerdam		
2008-2010	ASWH		
2011-2013	Capelle	22	(1)
2013	SHO		
- * Club domestic league appearances and goals

Joshua Brard (born 14 May 1986, in Dordrecht) is a Dutch former professional footballer. He played as a midfielder.

== Football ==
Brard grew up in Hendrik-Ido-Ambacht, where he started to play football at ASWH. During his youth he also spent some time in Japan. Joshua's father, Stanley Brard, was also a professional footballer, amongst others at Feyenoord, and had found employment in Japan.

Back in the Netherlands Brard signed with Sparta in 2005 where he only made it to the bench. In the summer of 2006 TOP Oss took over Brard's contract from Sparta. Here he played his 11 only games as a professional footballer. His contract was not renewed. After an internship in Japan, he played for the "amateur" sides LRC Leerdam, his youth club ASWH, for VV Capelle (2011–2013) and for VV SHO (2013).

In the 2010s he works as a project manager at a Hendrik-Ido-Ambacht firm that organizes training camps.
