= Heer Oudelands Ambacht =

Coordinates: 51.819864°N 4.619837°E

Heer Oudelands Ambacht is a neighbourhood of Zwijndrecht, Netherlands.

== History ==
Heer Oudelands Ambacht was a separate municipality between 1817 and 1857, when it merged with Kijfhoek into the existing municipality of Groote Lindt. In 1840, there were 12 houses and 84 residents in Heer Oudelands Ambacht.

Groote Lindt, containing Heer Oudelands Ambacht, merged into Zwijndrecht on 28 June 1881.

== People from Heer Oudelands Ambacht ==
- Ron Timmers
