= Glenn Corneille =

Dutch jazz pianist

- Born: 13 July 1970; Venlo, Netherlands
- Died: 23 August 2005 (aged 35); Baarn, Netherlands
- Genres: Jazz
- Occupation: Musician
- Instrument: Piano

Glenn Corneille (13 July 1970 in Venlo – 23 August 2005 in Baarn) was a Dutch jazz pianist. He studied at the Conservatory of Maastricht graduating in 1995 as a teacher. In 2004 he was part of Dominique van Hulst's production team.

Corneille played on albums by Boris, Do, Ben Cramer and Alessandro Saffina and was known as one of the pianists in the television programme "De notenclub", which was hosted by Nance and in which Danny Wuyts was the other pianist.

Corneille died in a car accident on 23 August 2005 and a benefit concert was performed in his honor.

== Family ==
Glenn's brother, Dogan Corneille, is an association football manager and former professional footballer.
