= Stefan van Dam =

Dutch footballer

Personal information
- Date of birth: 3 March 1983 (age 43)
- Place of birth: Sliedrecht, Netherlands
- Position: Midfielder

Youth career
- Sliedrecht
- 1991–2003: Willem II

Senior career*
Years	Team	Apps	(Gls)
2003–2004	Willem II	2	(0)
2004–2005	TOP Oss	6	(3)
2005–2010	ASWH		
2010–2011	Kozakken Boys		
2011–2017	Sliedrecht		

International career
2000s	Netherlands (Amateur)		
- * Club domestic league appearances and goals

Stefan van Dam (born 3 March 1983) is a Dutch retired footballer who played as a midfielder.

== Club career ==
Van Dam played in the youth of VV Sliedrecht, until moving to Willem II. He played his first professional game for Willem II in the Eredivisie in De Kuip. After two first team caps his contract was not renewed.

In summer 2004, Van Dam moved to TOP Oss. Here he experienced a good start with three goals in his first two games. After playing seven games his contract was not renewed.

Next he played in the first team of ASWH. In March 2010 he left for Kozakken Boys and a year later he rejoined Sliedrecht. In Sliedrecht he was the captain of team and played until summer 2017.

After his playing career, Van Dam started as a manager. He coached a youth team and the reserves of Sliedrecht and also worked as assistant-manager of the first team. In 2022 Van Dam joined his former club ASWH as an assistant-manager.

== International career ==
While playing for ASWH he also played in the Netherlands Amateur Football Team that was dismantled in 2007.
