= Leon van Dalen =

Dutch footballer

Personal information
- Date of birth: 28 January 1979 (age 47)
- Place of birth: Papendrecht, Netherlands
- Position: Midfielder

Youth career
- Drechtstreek
- Dordrecht '90

Senior career*
Years	Team	Apps	(Gls)
1998-2003	Dordrecht '90	122	(9)
2003-2008	TOP Oss	148	(5)
2008-2011	ASWH		
Total		270	(14)
- * Club domestic league appearances and goals

Leon van Dalen (Papendrecht, 28 January 1979) is a Dutch retired footballer, who played as a midfielder professionally at FC Dordrecht and TOP Oss. He is also an education professional.

== Career ==
After youth teams at VV Drechtstreek and FC Dordrecht, Leon van Dalen played in the Eerste Divisie for FC Dordrecht (1988–2004) and FC Oss (2004–2008). He continued to play football at ASWH and VV Drechtstreek. He is the father of two kids, footballer Rens van Dalen (2007) and Eva van Dalen.

In 1997 Van Dalen received a teaching certificate and has taught ever since. Since he 2003 he also engages in education management and consulting. Alongside, he coaches youth teams at VV Drechtstreek. He has also worked at the FC Dordrecht academy and as an assistant coach.

In april 2026, van Dalen announced he would become assistant to head coach John den Dunnen at hometown club Drechtstreek.
