= Berlicum =

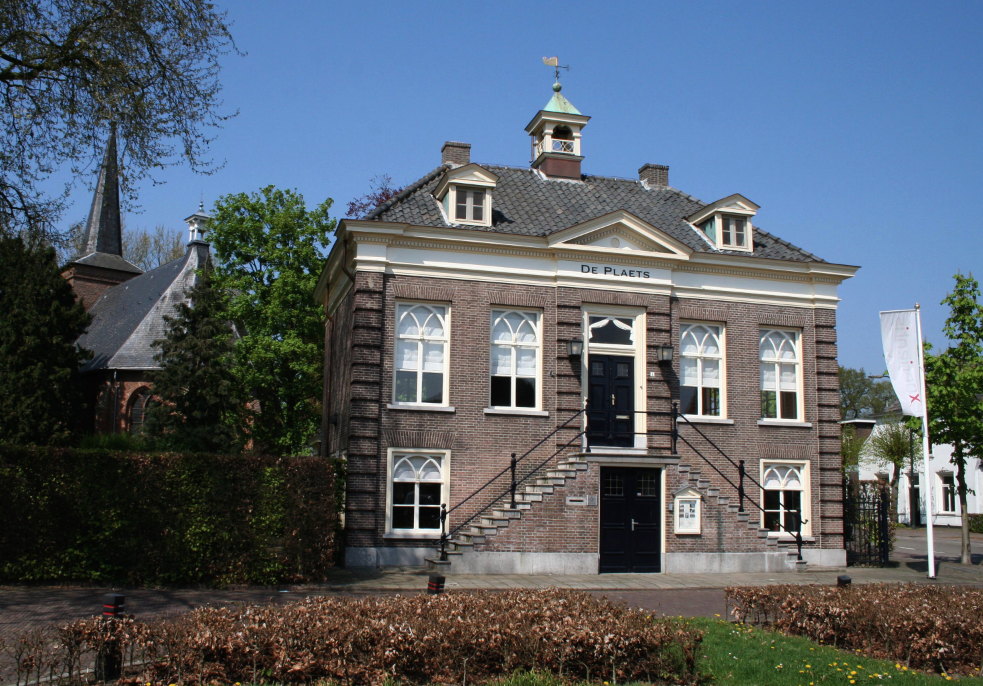
- 'De Plaets' (1845), former town hall

- Flag Coat of arms

- Location in the province of North Brabant in the Netherlands Berlicum (Netherlands)
- Coordinates: 51°40′N 5°23′E
- Country: Netherlands
- Province: North Brabant
- Municipality: Sint-Michielsgestel

Area
  - Total: 8.31 km^{2} (3.21 sq mi)
- Elevation: 19 m (62 ft)

Population (2021)
  - Total: 3,400
  - Density: 410/km^{2} (1,100/sq mi)
- Time zone: UTC+1 (CET)
  - Summer (DST): UTC+2 (CEST)
- Postal code: 5258
- Dialing code: 073
- Major roads: A59, A2, N279

Berlicum is a town in the south of the Netherlands, located in North Brabant's Meierij region near the city of 's-Hertogenbosch and the river Aa. The town was most likely founded between 600 and 700 AD. It was a municipality along with the village of Middelrode until a large-scale municipal reorganisation in 1996, when Berlicum and neighbouring Den Dungen merged with the municipality of Sint-Michielsgestel. In 2009, Berlicum had 9,743 inhabitants.

== History ==
The historic town centre is 'Raadhuisplein' (town hall square), on the northwestern edge of the town. The square is dominated by the neoclassical former town hall, known as 'De Plaets' (1845). Another notable building at the square is former mayor's mansion at number 18, with its distinctly white facade. Behind the former town hall is the Protestant 'Samen-op-Weg' church, a national monument dating back to the 14th century. The building was originally a Roman Catholic church under the care of priests from the nearby norbertine Berne Abbey. It became a Protestant church in 1648, when the region became part of the Dutch Republic after the Peace of Westphalia. Under the peace treaty, Catholics were allowed to exercise their religion in private. A clandestine church was built in 1676. In 1837, this church was replaced by a neogotical church building. Funding was provided by a government programme to compensate the loss of historically catholic church buildings during the Reformation period. The new church, named after Saint Peter ('R.K. Sint-Petruskerk') and located at Kerkwijk 44, was subsequently enlarged several times.

Both churches were heavily damaged during Operation Market Garden at the end of the Second World War, along with many other historic buildings in Berlicum, but were restored after the war. The new Saint Peter's church was substantially smaller than its predecessor and was provided with a traditionalist facade. An additional catholic church in neoromanesque style was built in the nearby village of Middelrode.

== Modern town ==
After the Second World War, Berlicum became a commuter town. In the 1970s a modern shopping centre, 'Mercuriusplein' square, was created in the geographical heart of the town. Most of the retail stores, three supermarkets and a weekly food market are located here. On the northern side of the square is the new town hall, established in 1982 and in use until the municipal reorganisation in 1996. The building was then transformed into apartments and stores.

In the face of secularization and rising maintenance costs, the diocese of 's-Hertogenbosch decided to close the church of Saint Peter in 2012. Catholic religious services are now provided at the Sacraments church in Middelrode.

== Transportation ==
The N279 highway along the Zuid-Willemsvaart canal connects the town with the two major commercial and industrial hubs in the region: 's-Hertogenbosch to the northwest and Veghel to the southeast. Regular public transport between these cities is provided by Arriva bus line 158, which has multiple stops in Berlicum.

== Famous inhabitants ==
- Herman de Man (1898–1946), novelist
- Miriam Oremans (1972), tennis player
- Esther Verhoef (1968), writer
- Jordens Peters (1987), soccer player
- Romijn Conen (1967), actor
- Henriëtte Ronner-Knip (1821–1909), painter
- Stef Doedée (1987), soccer goalkeeper

== Gallery ==
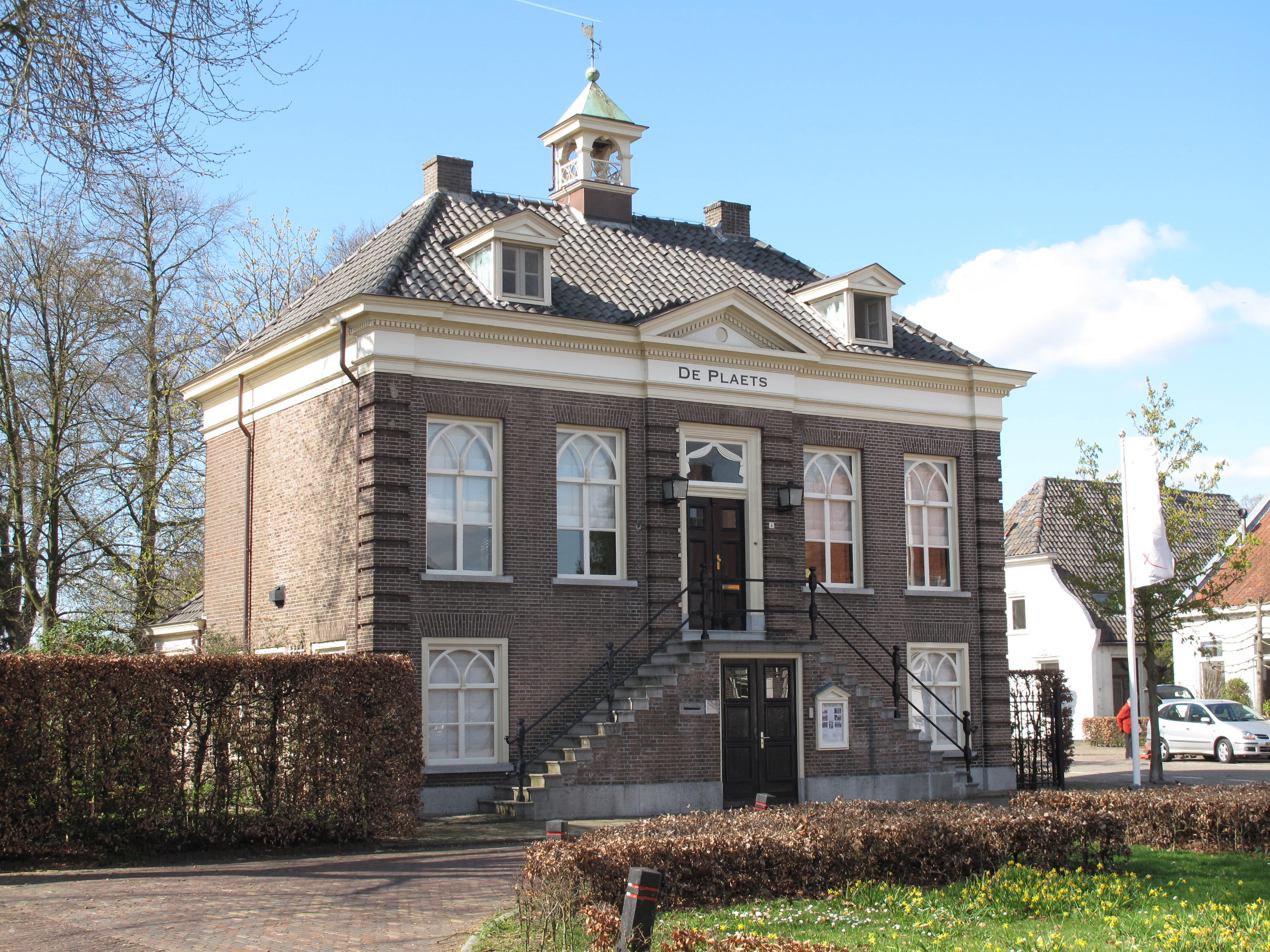
Berlicum, former town hall (De Plaets)

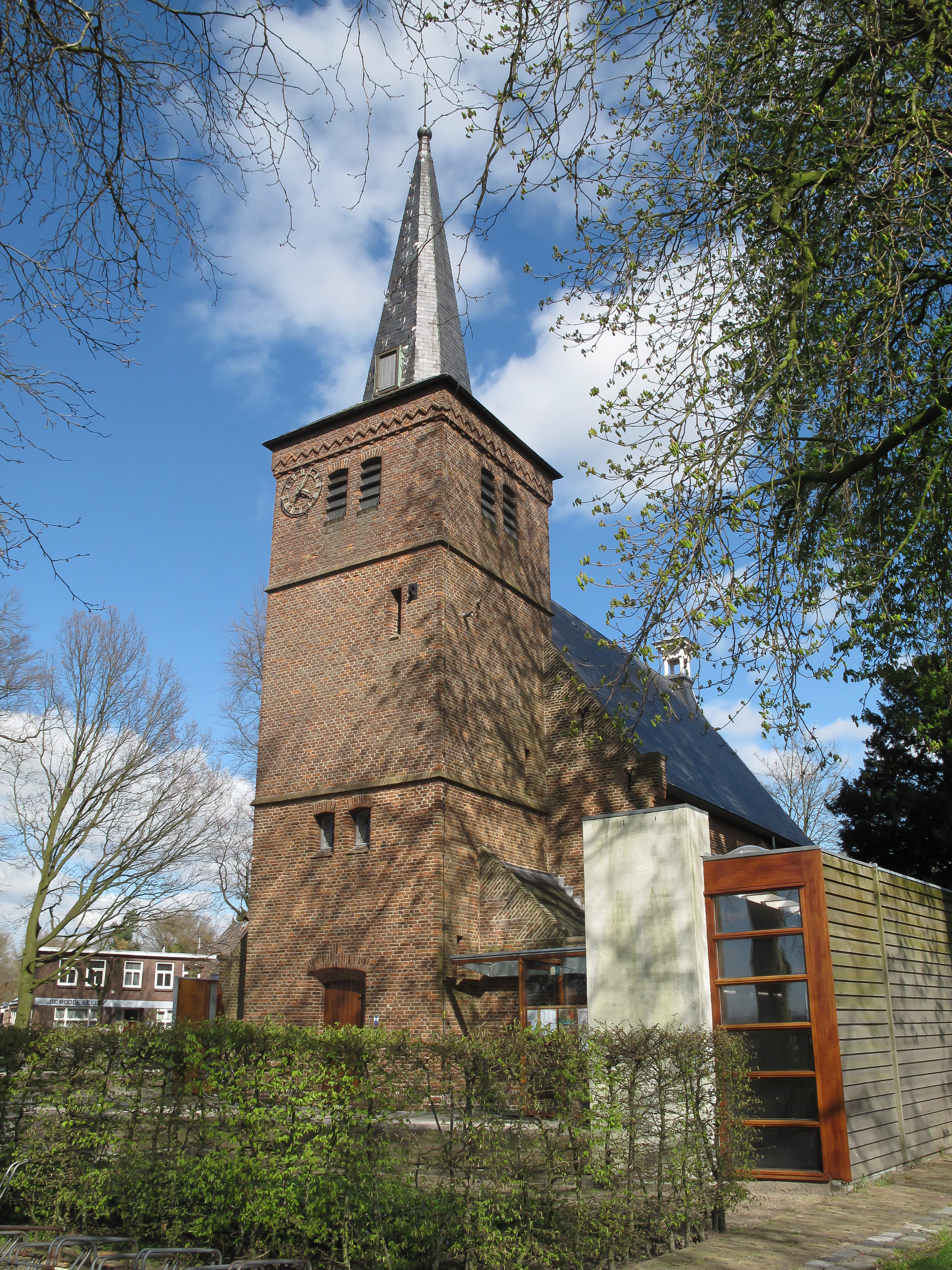
Berlicum, Protestant church

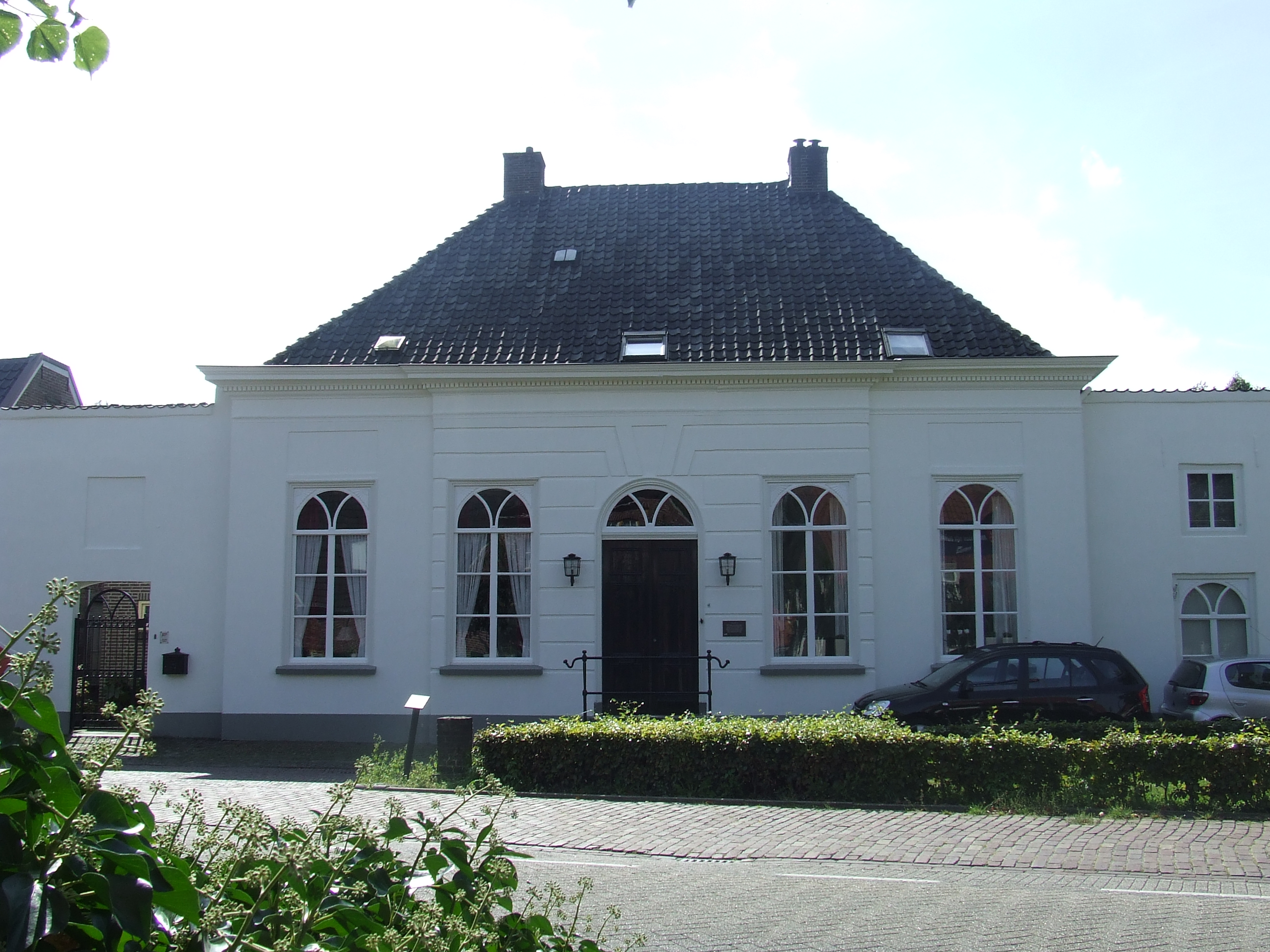
Berlicum, former mayor's mansion

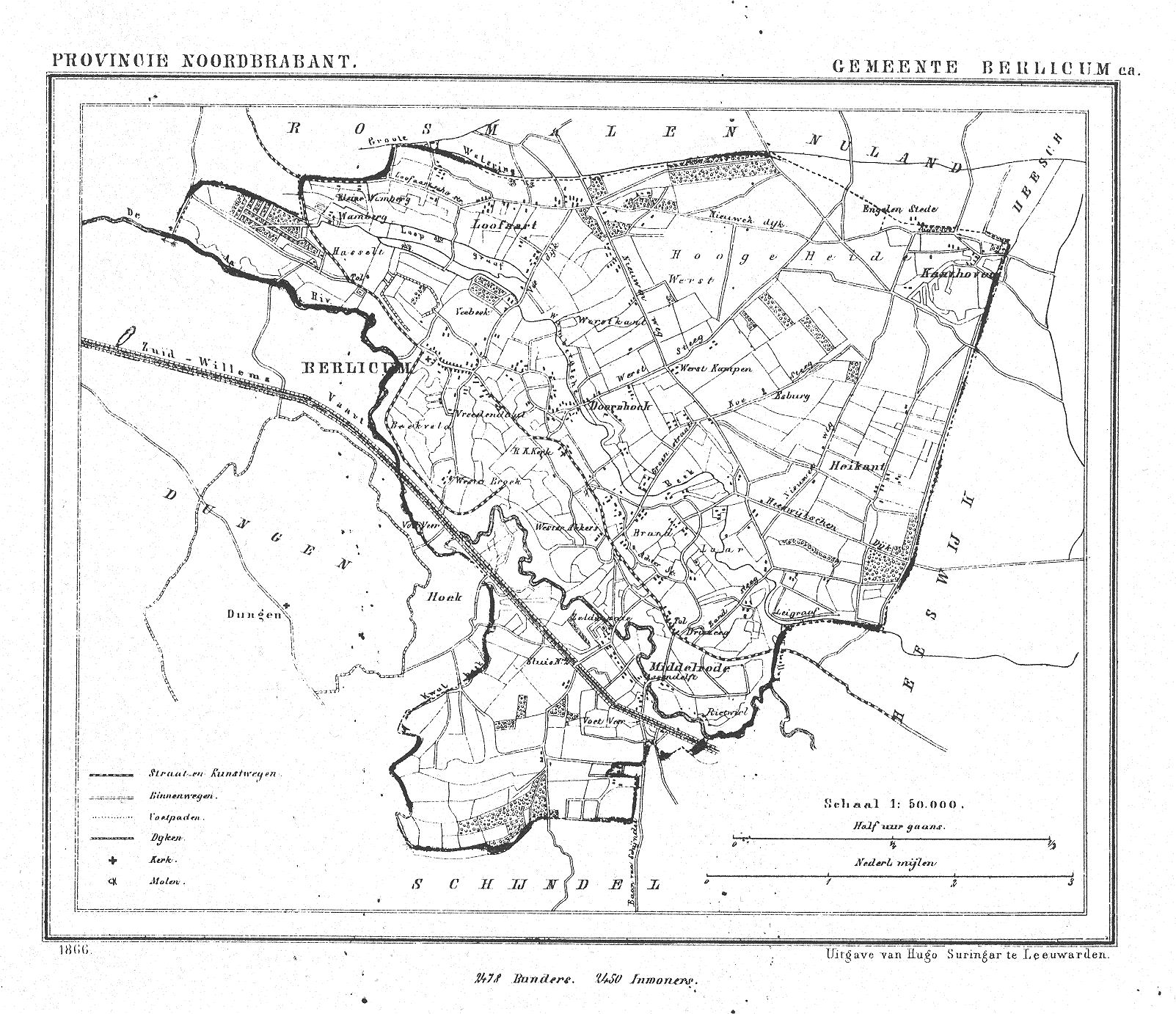
Berlicum, municipality in 1866

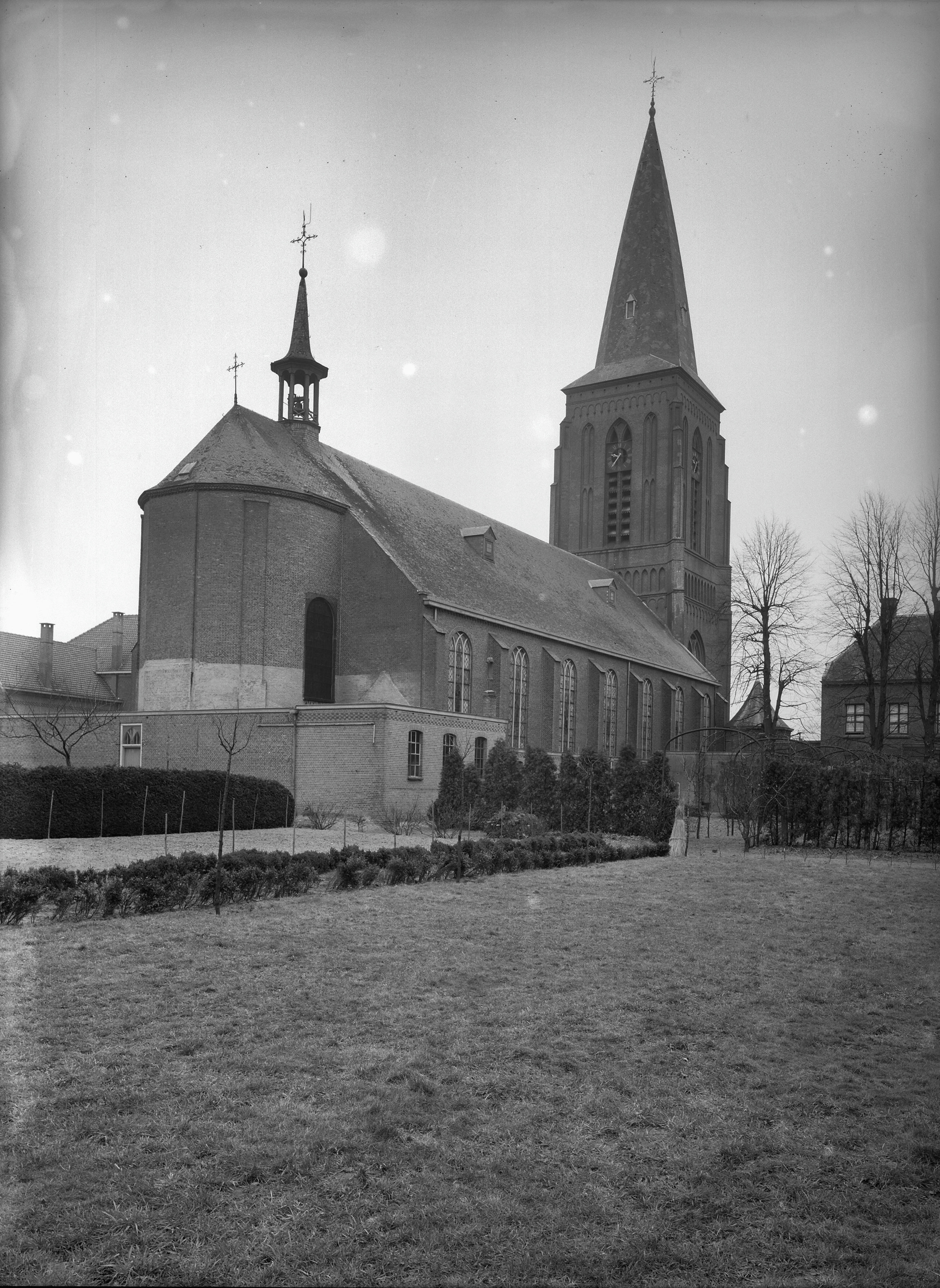
Berlicum, Saint Peter's church in 1933
