= Genridge Prijor =

Dutch footballer (born 1995)

Personal information
- Date of birth: 15 May 1995 (age 31)
- Place of birth: Zaandam, Netherlands
- Height: 1.76 m (5 ft 9 in)
- Position: Winger

Team information
- Current team: ASWH
- Number: 11

Youth career
- –2009: Hellas Sport
- 2009–2010: AFC
- 2010–2014: Volendam

Senior career*
Years	Team	Apps	(Gls)
2014–2016	Volendam	10	(0)
2016–2017	Lisse	2	(0)
2017–2020	ONS Sneek	74	(19)
2020–2021	Ajax Amateurs	2	(0)
2021–2023	OFC	49	(7)
2023–	ASWH	33	(13)
- * Club domestic league appearances and goals as of 4 August 2025

Genridge Prijor (born 15 May 1995) is a Dutch footballer who plays as a winger for ASWH.

== Career ==
Prijor played in the youth of Hellas Sport Combinatie, AFC, and Volendam.

=== 2014–20: Volendam, Lisse and ONS ===
On 20 September 2014, Prijor made his professional football debut at FC Volendam, playing against RKC Waalwijk. In the 83rd minute of the game, he came in for Kevin van Kippersluis.

Prior continued to FC Lisse. With his twin brother Denzel, he then played at ONS Sneek. Denzel had played alongside Genridge also at FC Lisse.

=== 2020–27: Ajax Amateurs, OFC and ASWH ===
In the 2020–21 season he played for Ajax Amateurs. From 2021 to 2023, Genridge Prijor played for OFC Oostzaan.

From the summer of 2023, he signed up to play at ASWH. In December 2023, while ASWH was well ahead of its nearest followers, Prijor was the first player on the squad to sign a contract extension. In 2023–24, he won a section championship and 3 trimester championships with ASWH. Prijor was, with 2,616 minutes, the most fielded player that season. In 2026, he became the captain of ASWH.

== Personal life ==
Outside football, Prijor works as a retail manager. He also manages a gaming channel on YouTube, GamingGenna.
