= Cesco Agterberg =

Dutch soccer coach

Personal information
- Date of birth: 25 January 1975 (age 51)
- Place of birth: Utrecht, Netherlands

Senior career*
Years	Team	Apps	(Gls)
- UVV Utrecht

Managerial career
- 1997–?: USV Elinkwijk (youth)
- 2000s: AZ Alkmaar (youth)
- 2000s: SV Argon (U19)
- 2004–2007: SC Woerden
- 2007: Al-Hazem (assistant)
- 2008–2010: Alphense Boys
- 2011–2012: Sportlust '46
- 2012–2015: Excelsior Maassluis
- 2015–2017: SC Feyenoord
- 2017–2018: DHSC
- 2018–2019: ASWH
- 2019–2021: SDC Putten
- 2021: SV Langbroek
- 2021–2023: RKVV Westlandia
- 2023–2024: VV Nieuwenhoorn
- 2024–2025: Excelsior Maassluis
- * Club domestic league appearances and goals

Cesco Agterberg (born 25 January 1975) is a Dutch football manager.

== Trainer career ==
=== 1997–2007: Utrecht teams, AZ youth and Al-Hazem ===
Agterberg started his training career in the youth department of USV Elinkwijk in 1997. In the 2002−2003 season he coached SV Argon's U19 team and a youth team of AZ Alkmaar.

From 2004 Agterberg managed the first squad of then Derde Klasse-side SC Woerden, winning a championship in 2006. After reaching 4th place with Woerden in 2007 he became assistant coach at Al-Hazem F.C. in July 2007. The Saudi stint lasted until October 2007.

=== 2008–2019: Three promotions in South Holland ===
From 2008 through 2010 Agterberg managed Alphense Boys. During his first year at Alphen, it won a section championship in the Tweede Klasse, promoting to the Eerste Klasse. In 2010 Alphen promoted again, this time from the second position in its league.

In April 2011 Agterberg became the trainer of Sportlust '46, continuing until summer 2012. Next, he managed Excelsior Maassluis until March 2015. That summer he picked up training at SC Feyenoord, where he continued for 2 years.

In 2017 Agterberg became coach of DHSC Utrecht, who let him go in February 2018. That same month he was hired by Derde Divisie club ASWH who signed him until summer 2019, after losing its previous coach, Jack van den Berg, to VV Katwijk in the Tweede Divisie. In December 2018 Agterberg notified ASWH he had to leave the club after the season, as his family had moved to a new location. Subsequently, Agterberg brought ASWH against all odds to the Tweede Divisie, from a 7th position in the Derde Divisie.

=== 2019–2025: Putten and more South Holland ===
Agterberg started coaching SDC Putten in the summer of 2019. While the season at Putten started well, it continued with a long series of losses. Agterberg left SDC Putten in the summer of 2021 to become chief coach of Sport Vereniging Langbroek, where he had signed for two years. Two weeks into the first season, he left SVL for RKVV Westlandia that played two tiers higher. On 22 November 2022, it was announced that Agterberg would leave Westlandia at the end of the 2022–23 season. According to the club's website, he was no longer able to balance his intensive role as head coach with his new employment.

While Agterberg had stated that he would take a sabbatical, in the end he signed with Vierde Divisie-side VV Nieuwenhoorn. He was let go before his contract ended. In the 2024–2025 season, Agterberg coached Excelsior Maassluis. He resigned in March 2025.
