= René Vermunt =

Dutch footballer and manager

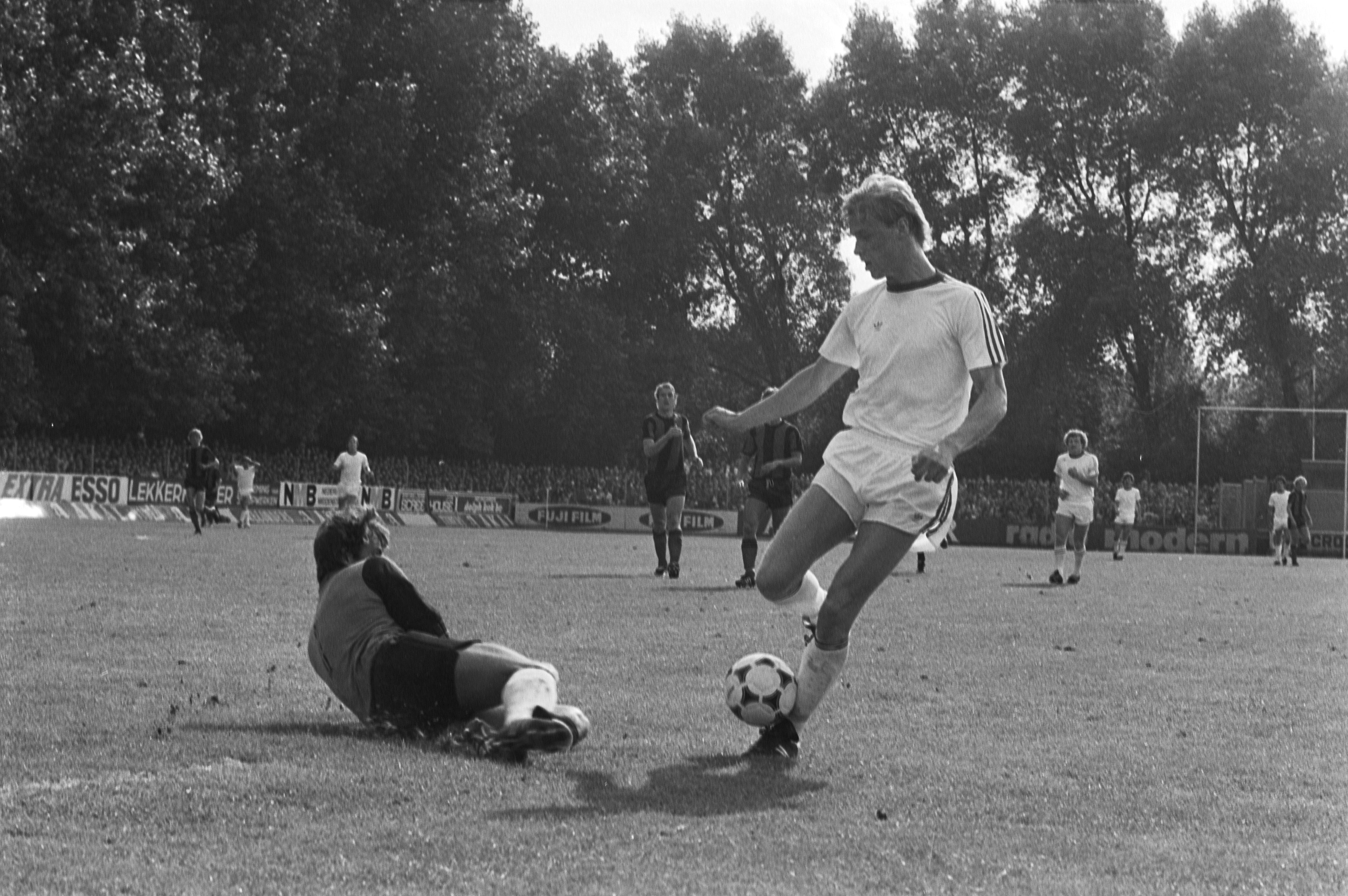
René Vermunt being passed by Feyenoord forward Pétur Pétursson

René Vermunt (26 August 1952) is a Dutch retired professional footballer and football manager. From 1970 to 1983, he was an Eredivisie and Eerste Divisie goalkeeper for SBV Excelsior. He went on to become the manager of several football clubs in the Rotterdam region.

== Sports career ==
=== Goalkeeper ===
In 1979, Vermunt showed his behind during a game against FC Groningen after receiving a yellow card. His football career came to an end in April 1983, due to a knee injury from September 1982.

=== Football manager ===
Vermunt first coached VV Heerjansdam (1988–1989), with whom he immediately won an Eerste Klasse championship. Vermunt's temper did not help him once more as he got into a fight with the club's president and was fired before the promotion playoff. Next he coached SSS Klaaswaal in the Tweede Klasse (1990–1991), leading it to relegation, and ASWH in the Eerste Klasse (1991–93). After once renewing Vermunt's contract, ASWH replaced him with Arie van der Zouwen.

After a hiatus, Vermunt became the manager of VV Capelle in 1996. Capelle was at that time a newcomer in the Hoofdklasse. With some breaks, a mature Vermunt managed Capelle until 2011. In 2011, Ronald Klinkenberg took over from Vermunt.

== Early and personal life ==
Vermunt studied physical education. He married Ria van Tilburg in 1981.
