= Jeffrey Altheer =

Dutch retired professional footballer

Personal information
- Date of birth: 9 March 1987 (age 39)
- Place of birth: Rotterdam, Netherlands
- Height: 1.78 m (5 ft 10 in)
- Positions: Defender; midfielder

Senior career*
Years	Team	Apps	(Gls)
2006–2009	Feyenoord	0	(0)
2007–2009	→ Excelsior (loan)	50	(3)
2009–2012	Helmond Sport	60	(5)
2012–2015	VVV-Venlo	49	(1)
2015	Willem II	0	(0)
2016	ASWH	3	(0)
2020−	VV Lekkerkerk		

International career
- Netherlands U18
- Netherlands U19
- Netherlands U21
- * Club domestic league appearances and goals as of 14:40, 21 August 2022 (UTC)

Jeffrey J. D. Altheer (born 9 March 1987) is a Dutch retired professional footballer, who played as a defender and midfielder.

== Club career ==
Born in Rotterdam, Altheer began his career with Feyenoord; following a two-year loan spell with Excelsior, he left Feyenoord at the end of the 2008–09 season following the expiry of his contract. He then signed for Helmond Sport in August 2009, on an amateur basis. He signed a three-year contract with VVV-Venlo in May 2012 and joined Willem II in summer 2015.

In April 2016 Altheer signed with ASWH, where he finished his football career in October that year. Since 2020, he has played for VV Lekkerkerk.

== International career ==
Altheer was a Dutch youth international, representing Netherlands at under-18, under-19, and under-21 levels.
