= ASWH =

Dutch association football club

- Full name: Altijd Sterker Worden Hendrik-Ido-Ambacht
- Nicknames: De Trots van H.I. Ambacht (The Pride of H.I. Ambacht); Klein Duimpje (Hop-o'-My-Thumb)
- Short name: ASWH
- Founded: 1 August 1929; 97 years ago
- Ground: Sportpark Schildman; Hendrik-Ido-Ambacht; Netherlands
- Capacity: 3,000
- Coordinates: 51.84338°N 4.63169°E
- Chairman: Joost Penning (2024–)
- Head coach: Johan Sturrus (2026–)
- League: Vierde Divisie
- 2025–26: Derde Divisie B, 18th of 18
- Website: aswh.nl
| Home colours | Away colours | Third colours |

ASWH, short for Altijd Sterker Worden Hendrik-Ido-Ambacht, is an association football club from Hendrik-Ido-Ambacht, Netherlands. The club was founded in 1929. Its first squad won ten section championships, one in every decade since 1949, with the exception of three (Dutch third-tier) championships in the 2000s and no championship in the 2010s. In 2005 ASWH also won the Dutch Championship of Amateur Soccer and the Dutch Championship of Saturday Soccer. In 2011, the second squad won the national title for reserve teams. Ascending gradually through the ranks, ASWH played 2019–2022 in the semi-professional Tweede Divisie. Since 2024, the first squad plays in the Derde Divisie. In 2025–26, ASWH operates 77 teams in competitions, a growth of 7 since 2023–24.

ASWH has also been successful in cups: it won the KNVB Amateur Cup in 2006 and 2014, the District Cup South I in 2006, 2014 and 2016, and the Dutch Super Cup for Amateurs in 2005 and 2014. In the 2006–07 KNVB Cup, ASWH defeated the professional side Cambuur in the 16th finals, 4–2, before losing 0–5 against Roda JC in the 8th finals. In the 2013–14 KNVB Cup, it lost 4–1 against Ajax in the 16th finals. In the 2016–17 KNVB Cup, ASWH again reached the 8th finals, where it lost 2–0 against AZ Alkmaar. In the 2024–2025 Cup, ASWH lost 0–1 to professional side SC Heerenveen in the 32 clubs round.

== Club name ==
The origin of the club's name is not clear. Some claim ASW stood for Altijd Sporten Wij (We're Always Sporting), others claim it meant Altijd Sterker Worden (Always Growing Stronger). Clueless about which of the two is historically correct, club members eventually settled on "Altijd Sterker Worden" because of a general preference for this phrase as is. An H for Hendrik-Ido-Ambacht was later added as there were additional clubs with the name ASW.

== History ==
=== 1929–1949: Eventful first twenty years ===
==== 1929–1939: Foundation, no ground and CNVB ====
The club was founded on August 1, 1929, as ASW, by five children from Hendrik-Ido-Ambacht: Bas van Wingerden (born 1915), Johannes van Wingerden (born 1917), Jan van Nieuwenhuyzen (born 1917), Siem van der Wulp (born 1919) and Harmen Haksteeg (born 1920). The oldest of the five, 14-year-old Bas van Wingerden, became the club's first chairman. He was succeeded by then-16-year-old Harmen Haksteeg in 1936. Haksteeg would remain chairman of the club until 1971.

The club initially played only friendly away matches, for lack of its own ground, and could not join a competition. This changed when farmer Nugteren gave the club a pasture in 1936, coincidentally (as the club kept moving around) opposite the location of its current field. The first home match was played on May 25, 1936, against ULO Groenendijk. The club joined the Rotterdam district of the Christian Dutch Football Association, as a new club in its third and lowest class. On 2 November 1936 ASW lost in Rijsoord 3–1 against VV Rijsoord, the leaders of the competition and initially a stronger rival of ASW. With ASW central forward Pons missing, Van der Wulp scored an equalizer for H.I. Ambacht, yet the team and its keeper were no match for Rijsoord.

Starting in the 1937–38 season, the classes of the struggling CNVB were reorganized into regional sections. Henceforth ASW played in section C in the equivalent of a regional class 1, so it went supposedly up two tiers, while there was a stronger quality variance. In its first loss for this season, ASWH was beaten 7–4 by VVE Nieuw Lekkerland, in what the Nieuwsblad voor de Hoeksche Waard en IJselmonde [sic] praised as "a match in which often good soccer could be enjoyed." On Monday, 6 June 1938 ASWH drew 1–1 against ONA Gouda and 0–0 against ZCFC Zaandam – the eventual winners of the 1B division cup – in the Western Tourneer of the Christian Dutch Football Association. In March 1939, ASW played again a strong game against VVE, going 1–0 into recession. In the second half VVE received and utilized a penalty shot. The supporters and players were annoyed by the decision, the referee by their protest, and decided with little reason to quit the game.

==== 1939–1949: KNVB, WWII and first championship ====
In 1939–40, ASWH participated in an emergency competition. The competition was managed by the KNVB by standards set by the CNVB that had collapsed as the season was about to start. Initially, ASWH drew against Oranje Wit Dordrecht, 0–0. On 28 September 1940, "that brave little club" from Hendrik-Ido-Ambacht beat Rijsoord, 2–3, in Rijsoord. In November 1941, ASW led the regional Division B competition unbeaten, beating among others Dordrecht 3–1. In 1942 the Nazis confiscated the field of ASW after which it played on Ido's Football Club grounds on the Nieuwe Bosweg. The last game during World War II was a 1–5 loss against Kinderdijk-side VV De Zwerver in February 1944.

The first game after the war was a 3–0 loss against H.I.-Ambacht partner and rival IFC. Gradually an H for Hendrik-Ido-Ambacht was added to the club name, to avoid confusion with ASW from Dordrecht (merged into SC Reeland in 1997) and ASW from Waddinxveen (continuing under this name). The first section title for ASWH 1, in the highest division of the Dordrecht district of the Royal Dutch Football Association, was won in 1949, after winning all matches. The right for promotion posed a problem: the pitch didn't meet the criteria for admission to the main league system of the KNVB. A new ground on the Pruimendijk in Oostendam was offered by farmer Plaisier, and the club was promoted.

=== 1949–1970: Vierde Klasse and Derde Klasse ===
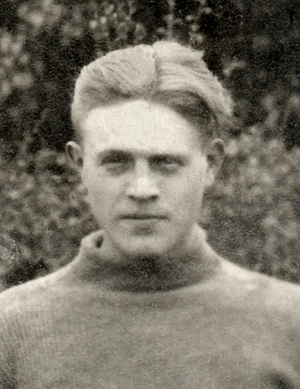
During 1954–58, Floor de Zeeuw, former goalkeeper on Feyenoord's first squad, coached ASWH 1.

During almost the entire 1950s ASWH played in the Vierde Klasse 4C and 4D. It ended 9th in 1954, 8th in 1955 and '56, 7th in 1950, 4th in 1953 and '58, 3rd in 1951 and '57, and runner-up in 1952. In the runner-up year it was supposed to play an important game against Woudrichem, where the referee failed to show up. One of the larger victories during these years was the November 1952 shellacking of PPSC of Schiedam at 6–0. In 1959 it won the 4D section championship and promoted to the Derde Klasse.

The first gig in the Derde Klasse B lasted only one year and in the summer of 1960 ASWH went back to the Vierde Klasse from position 9. For an equally short period as in 1961 ASWH secured its second Vierde Klasse section championship. In the decisive game, on Saturday 18 March 1961, it had beaten SV Bolnes 2–0 in Ambacht. ASWH thus promoted a second time to the Derde Klasse, this time staying for 2 seasons. In 1963 ASWH returned to the Vierde Klasse for two seasons.

In 1965 it was promoted from the second position in the Vierde Klasse, never to return to the Vierde again. Now a stable Derde Klasse team, it ended 8th in 1966, runner-up in 1967, 5th in 1968, and 6th in 1969.

=== 1970–1996: Tweede Klasse and Eerste Klasse ===
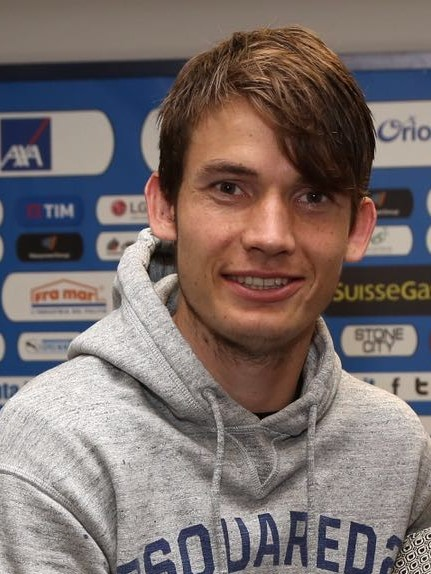
Marten de Roon played late 1990s and early 2000s in ASWH youth teams. Presently he plays for Atalanta BC and the Dutch national team.

In 1970 the Ambacht side won its only Derde Klasse championship after it beat RC Leiderdorp 2–0 at home. It promoted to the Tweede Klasse where it would play for the remainder of the 1970s and beyond.

Henk van Osch coached the team for a full five years, from 1979 to 1984, a sign of stability in the club. In 1983, ASWH won its first and only Tweede Klasse championship. According to Het Volk, it secured the title mid-April, through a single goal by Rob Prins against AZVV in Terneuzen. Trouw claimed that the decisive game was a home match against Good Luck, also beating the opponent by a modest 1–0. Trouw did not list the scorer for that game, yet mentions Jaap Kense as the striker behind ASWH's success.

During the remainder of the 1980s, ASWH played in the Eerste Klasse. Henk van Osch was replaced by Cees van de Bosch. After Van den Bosch, ASWH hired the first coach since the 1950s who was a former professional, Gerard Weber, serving from 1986–1988. Weber was let go before the end of his second season, a first for the conservative village club, after which Cees van de Bosch came back to complete the season. During the seasons 1992–1995, ASWH played back in the Tweede Klasse. In 1995 it returned to the Eerste Klasse.

=== 1996–2016: Hoofdklasse and national amateur titles ===
In 1996 ASWH was promoted from the Eerste Klasse to the Hoofdklasse, at that time the third tier and the highest tier of amateur football in the Netherlands. The club was relegated two years later, followed by the title in the Eerste Klasse and automatic promotion back to the Hoofdklasse. The club was placed in the Saturday Hoofdklasse B, where it finished in third place. The next season brought the first Hoofdklasse title in the club's existence. In 2002 ASWH again won the title, this time in the Saturday Hoofdklasse A.

A third Hoofdklasse championship was earned in 2004–05, this time followed by the national title for Saturday amateurs, defeating IJsselmeervogels and Excelsior '31, and the national amateur championship, defeating Mijdrecht-side SV Argon. In 2011, ASWH's second squad won the national amateur title for reserve teams. From Fall 2010 through Spring 2016 ASWH played continuously in Hoofdklasse B. In the 2015–2016 season, ASWH finished third in the Hoofdklasse. Through playoffs, it was promoted for the first time beyond the Hoofdklasse, to the newly coined Derde Divisie.

In the 2016–17 KNVB Cup ASWH beat De Treffers 0–3 in Groesbeek in the first round. In the second round, it won 2–3 over SV Spakenburg in Spakenburg. In the third round it lost 2–0 against AZ Alkmaar in Alkmaar. While ASWH suffered a moderate loss and returned to Ambacht with dignified results against a leading professional team, AZ did not utilize several of its prime players. AZ eventually were runners-up in the national cup.

=== 2016–2026: Derde Divisie and Tweede Divisie ===
==== 2016–2019: Derde Divisie at last ====
ASWH started its first Derde Divisie season with a series of victories, eventually stopped at a 1–3 defeat against Heemskerk-side ODIN '59 on 25 September 2016. It was a sour loss as ASWH had not been beaten at Sportpark Schildman since November 2015 and controlled the ball 70 percent of the game. Regrouping soon enough, ASWH completed its first Derde Divisie season in 4th position.

The second Derde Divisie season of ASWH started rather weak with defeats against FC Groningen (0–1), Quick Boys (0–1), and FC Volendam (0–5), draws against SV Spakenburg (2–2), DSV Ermelo (0–0), Jong Twente (2–2), VVOG Harderwijk (1–1), and VV Spijkenisse (0–0), and victories against Magreb Utrecht (2–5) and in a regional derby against VV Capelle (0–1). It finished the season in a disappointing 11th position, yet played good enough to remain in the Derde Divisie.

In the 2017–18 KNVB Cup ASWH was out in its first game, against Hoofdklasse-team HSV Hoek, when the Zeelanders beat ASWH 1–3 in Sportpark Schildman. ASWH 2 followed suit; it did not pass the classifying stage of the District Cup after it lost 3–1 against VV De Zwerver. In 2019 the youth department was certified by the KNVB as a regional football academy.

ASWH strengthened throughout its third Derde Divisie season and on 25 May 2019 it secured the championship of the third period (season trimester), placing the club in the promotion playoff. After a 2-1 victory at Sportpark Schildman and 2-2 in Oostzaan, ASWH qualified for a playoff final against FC Lienden. In the finals, it lost the first game at Sportpark Schildman 0–1, then won 2–0 in Lienden, securing the promotion to the Tweede Divisie.

==== 2019–2022: Tweede Divisie and COVID-19 ====
In its first game in the Tweede Divisie, ASWH drew against title candidate SV Spakenburg, 1–1. Sam van de Kreeke, who defeated FC Lienden with a second and last goal in the promotion finals, also scored the first goal in ASWH's new league. Next Saturday, ASWH was beaten 0–3 by VV Katwijk, another contender for the Tweede Divisie championship, and dropped from a shared 7th place to 15th position. In the third week, ASWH won its first Tweede Divisie game, 2–0 against SVV Scheveningen through goals by Abderrahim Loukili and Clarence Bijl, rising to 11th position. In week 5, ASWH was badly beaten by VV Noordwijk, 5–1. Noordwijk promoted alongside ASWH to the Tweede Divisie. ASWH dropped to 14th position. A series of mostly defeats followed, bringing ASWH to the last spot on December 7, after losing 0–4 against HHC Hardenberg. After two draws against other bottom contenders, with a defeat in between, ASWH rose to the 17th spot on January 25. After an expected defeat on February 2 against IJsselmeervogels, 4–1, ASWH was dead last again. A home victory of ASWH on 8 February over GVVV brought the club to 17th position and brought fresh hope for remaining in the Tweede Divisie. On 29 February, after losing to Excelsior Maassluis, ASWH returned to the 18th last spot. It remained in the Tweede Dvisie as there were no relegations due to the COVID-19 pandemic in the Netherlands.

ASWH had a usually successful game preparation for its second Tweede Klasse Season that included a 1–0 victory against the 1st squad of the professional side FC Dordrecht. In its first league game against the strong Kozakken Boys in Werkendam, ASWH surprised with a narrow 2–3 loss, having reduced Kozakken's lead while ASWH played with only 10 players. In the third game it won as a visitor in Scheveningen from one goal, scored in the 21st second by Daniel Wissel. A 2–0 victory against De Treffers at home brought ASWH to second position, a 3–2 loss against AFC (after ASWH had led twice) to the fourth place, and a 2–0 victory over Quick Boys back to runner-up position, where it finished the season, due to the COVID-19 pandemic.

==== 2022–2026: Mostly Derde and women championship ====
With an almost entirely new squad, ASWH started its preparations for a Derde Divisie season on 9 July 2022. It started the season on August 20, with an out victory against Harkemase Boys, 1–3. ASWH finished last with 27 points, and was relegated for the second year in a row, this time to the fifth-tier Vierde Divisie. It was the first time that ASWH had relegated twice.

For the 2023–24 season, ASWH recruited from OFC Oostzaan the former FC Volendam professional Genridge Prijor, several players from other amateur teams, and it advanced more than the usual of its youth players. Most players were again new to ASWH and, atypical to ASWH, all others played just one year for the club. By winter break it led the table at a staggering 11-point advantage over FC 's-Gravenzande in second position, having lost only one game since the beginning of the season, against bottom-dweller RVVH of Ridderkerk. On the route, it won the first-trimester championship, securing at participation in the promotion playoff, if not taking the championship. ASWH went on to also win the second trimester and, on April 20, a very early Vierde Klasse championship, as it had opened a 17-point distance from any competition. After winning and losing two more games each, ASWH also won the third trimester and promoted to the Derde Divisie with a 14 point advantage.

For the 2024–25 season, ASWH recruited from Jodan Boys the former FC Dordrecht and NAC Breda professional Quincy Tavares. While it lost Wout Neelen to VV Kloetinge, Luis Pedro, Genridge Prijor, and most other players continued. It started the new season in the Derde Divisie with a series four defeats in a row, broken off with a 1–4 victory against fellow bottom dweller VV Goes. Then followed a series of 9 games without losses, mostly winning, bringing ASWH temporarily to the 8th place and to be contending for the second trimester championship. In the end, it came second in the second trimester title, and finished 12th over the entire season.

ASWH commenced its preparations for the 2025–26 season with a 1–1 draws against NAC Breda U21 and against Eerste Divisie-side FC Dordrecht, and a dignified 2–3 loss against Eredivisie-team Excelsior Rotterdam. It remained in the lowest ranks of the league and secured relegation by May 9, eventually relegating from the last spot. The female footballers, after many years of no women or smaller teams, had a full blown team that immediately secured a 5th Class championship by winning all games but for one loss and one draw, scoring 5 goals on average per game. ASWH 2 won a Reserve 2nd Class championship and promoted to the Reserve First Class.

=== 2026–: Vierde Divisie ===
For the 2025-26 season in the Vierde Divisie, Robbert Olijfveld returned to ASWH. Luuk Admiraal, Luis Pedro, and Benjamin Reemst left. Prijor and Touré continued, yet Touré quit after the second game. The team lost most preparation games.

== Honors ==
=== Championships ===
Dutch Championship Amateur Soccer
Champion in 2005
Dutch Championship Saturday Soccer
Champion in 2005
Section championship
Champion in 1949, 1959, 1961, 1970, 1983, 1999, 2001, 2002, 2005, 2024

=== Cups ===
KNVB Amateur Cup
Winner in 2006, 2014
District Cup South I
Winner in 2006, 2014, 2016
Dutch Super Cup for Amateurs
Winner in 2005, 2014
Rijnmond Cup
Winner in 2017
Hendrik-Ido-Ambacht Cup
Winner in 2018

=== National KNVB Cup ===
The following table lists all games against professional teams in the KNVB Cup. Results where ASWH won or drew are listed in bold.

| Season | Round | Game | Result | ASWH goals |
|---|---|---|---|---|
| 1985–86 | 1st round | ASWH - BV Emmen | **2-1** | Michel Devilee; Andries Doree |
| 1985–86 | 2nd round | Fortuna Sittard - ASWH | 3-0 | |
| 2000-01 | Group 9 | ASWH - FC Den Bosch | 0-5 | |
| 2001-02 | Group 12 | ASWH - FC Den Bosch | 0-4 | |
| 2002-03 | Group 9 | ASWH - FC Eindhoven | **0-0** | |
| 2002-03 | Group 9 | ASWH - RKC Waalwijk | 0-5 | |
| 2003-04 | 1st round | ASWH - FC Eindhoven | 1-2 | John Verbaan |
| 2005-06 | 2nd round | ASWH - FC Utrecht | 0-4 | |
| 2006–07 | 1st round | ASWH - SC Cambuur | **4-2 after** **extension** | Arjan Human (3); Ferry van Lare |
| 2006–07 | 2nd round | Roda JC Kerkrade - ASWH | 5-0 | |
| 2009-10 | 3rd round | Helmond Sport - ASWH | 5-0 | |
| 2013-14 | 3rd round | AFC Ajax - ASWH | 4-1 | Michael van Dommelen |
| 2016-17 | 8th finals | AZ Alkmaar - ASWH | 2-0 | |
| 2018-19 | 2nd round | FC Utrecht - ASWH | 5-1 | Jesper van den Bosch |
| 2021-22 | 1st round | ASWH - Heracles Almelo | 1-3 | Luuk Admiraal |
| 2024-25 | 2nd round | ASWH - SC Heerenveen | 0-1 | |

== Competition results ==
=== 1929–1983 ===
| | | | | | | | ? 3 | 2; C | ? C | ~~?~~; C | ? B | 7; A | 3; A | | | 2; Sa | 5; Sa | 2; Sa | 1; Sa | 7; 4D | 3; 4D | 2; 4D | 4; 4C | 9; 4C | 8; 4D | 8; 4C | 3; 4C | 4; 4C | 1; 4D | 9; 3B | 1; 4C | 6; 3B | 10; 3B | 5; 4C | 2; 4D | 8; 3B | 2; 3A | 5; 3B | 6; 3A | 1; 3B | 4; 2B | 3; 2A | 4; 2B | 7; 2B | 10; 2A | 9; 2B | 8; 2B | 12; 2A | 10; 2B | 3; 2B | 2; 2B | 3; 2B | 1; 2A |
| 30 | 31 | 32 | 33 | 34 | 35 | 36 | 37 | 38 | 39 | 40 | 41 | 42 | 43 | 44 | 45 | 46 | 47 | 48 | 49 | 50 | 51 | 52 | 53 | 54 | 55 | 56 | 57 | 58 | 59 | 60 | 61 | 62 | 63 | 64 | 65 | 66 | 67 | 68 | 69 | 70 | 71 | 72 | 73 | 74 | 75 | 76 | 77 | 78 | 79 | 80 | 81 | 82 | 83 |

=== Since 1983 ===
| 6; 1A | 6; 1B | 6; 1A | 9; 1B | 13; 1B | 7; 1B | 6; 1A | 12; 1B | 13; 1B | 4; 2A | 5; 2B | 4; 2B | 7; 1B | 4; A | 13; A | 1; 1C | 3; B | 1; B | 1; A | 3; B | 8; A | 1; A | 2; B | 4; A | 9; A | 4; A | 8; A | 4; B | 3; B | 2; B | 7; B | 4; B | 3; B | 4; Sa | 11; Sa | 7; Sa | ~~18~~ | ~~2~~ | 18 | 18; Sa | 1; B | 12; B | 18; B | 12*; B |
| 84 | 85 | 86 | 87 | 88 | 89 | 90 | 91 | 92 | 93 | 94 | 95 | 96 | 97 | 98 | 99 | 00 | 01 | 02 | 03 | 04 | 05 | 06 | 07 | 08 | 09 | 10 | 11 | 12 | 13 | 14 | 15 | 16 | 17 | 18 | 19 | 20 | 21 | 22 | 23 | 24 | 25 | 26 | 27 |

Seasons by league

3 Tweede Divisie
6 Derde Divisie
21 Vierde Divisie (2)
Hoofdklasse (19)
11 Eerste Klasse
16 Tweede Klasse
8 Derde Klasse
13 Vierde Klasse
7 (K)NVB Dordrecht
1 Emergency league
2 CNVB Rotterdam
1 CNVB Rotterdam 3
9 Games, no league

Symbols

1* ongoing
? unknown rank
– not started
~~3~~ stopped

== Players ==
As of 9 September 2026

Note: Flags indicate national team as defined under FIFA eligibility rules; some limited exceptions apply. Players may hold more than one non-FIFA nationality.

| No. | Pos. | Nation | Player |
|---|---|---|---|
| 1 | GK | NED | Jeffrey Verkerk |
| 2 | DF | NED | Tristan Armand |
| 3 | DF | NED | Nathan Lansman |
| 4 | DF | SMA | Ronan Olivacce |
| 5 | DF | NED | Philip Dragon |
| 6 | DF | NED | Joël Mayala |
| 7 | MF | NED | Samuel van der Velden |
| 8 | MF | CPV | Angelo Nascimento |
| 9 | FW | NED | Robbert Olijfveld |
| 10 | MF | NED | Dylan Baas |
| 11 | FW | SUR | Genridge Prijor (c) |

| No. | Pos. | Nation | Player |
|---|---|---|---|
| 12 | GK | NED | Owen van Rosmalen |
| 14 | MF | NED | Christian Bellassai |
| 15 | MF | NED | Lucas de Bruin |
| 16 | GK | NED | Sven Zijlstra |
| 17 | DF | NED | Mayron Mathew |
| 19 | FW | NED | Shanley Olijfveld |
| 20 | MF | MAR | Naoufal el Haddioui |
| 21 | DF | CPV | Julliën Moerman |
| 22 | MF | NED | Sam Stolk |
| 23 | FW | MAR | Jawad Bellahsan |
| 42 | FW | MAR | Abdel Belarbi |

=== Player of the year ===
- 1985–86: Wout Tims
- 1986–87: Aad van de Graaf
- 1987–88: Ruud Dorst
- 1988–89: Tjesco de Goede
- 1989–90: Leo van Driel
- 1990–91: Martin Nouwen
- 1991–92: Leo van Driel
- 1992–93: Martin Nouwen
- 1993–94: Marcel Dekker
- 1994–95: Jan Scheurwater
- 1995–96: Ruud Dorst
- 1996–97: Michel Devilee
- 1997–98: Willem Jan Barendregt
- 1988–99: Willem Jan Barendregt
- 1999–00: Ron Tempelaar
- 2000–01: Michel Devilee
- 2001–02: Michel Devilee
- 2002–03: Johan Sturrus
- 2003–04: Willem Jan Barendregt
- 2004–05: Ferry van Lare
- 2005–06: Willem Jan Barendregt
- 2006-07: Arjan Human
- 2007-08: Damiën Vereecken
- 2008-09: Joshua Brard
- 2009-10: Henk Roeland
- 2010–11: Jordy van de Corput
- 2011–12: Mels van Driel
- 2012–13: Jordy van de Corput
- 2013-14: Michael van Dommelen
- 2014–15: Rutger de Bos
- 2015–16: Mels van Driel
- 2016–17: Jerry Tieleman
- 2017–18: Stef Doedee
- 2018–19: Gilmaro van de Werp

=== Top scorer ===
- 2014–15: (13 goals each)
  - Serginio van Axel-Dongen
  - Michael van Dommelen
- 2015–16: Michael van Dommelen (14 goals)
- 2016–17: Peter de Lange (20 goals)
- 2017–18: Kyle Doesburg (13 goals)
- 2018–19: Ismail Yildirim (14 goals)
- 2019–20: Sam van de Kreeke (6 goals; season stopped)
- 2020–21: Daniël Wissel (3 goals; season stopped)
- 2021–22: Luuk Admiraal (8 goals; left in winter break)
- 2022–23: (5 goals each)
  - Mohamed El Kharbachi
  - Yassin Ouja
- 2023–24 Bradley Tuinfort (15 goals)
- 2024–25: (13 goals each)
  - Genridge Prijor
  - Quincy Tavares
- 2025-26: Abdel Belarbi (9 goals)

=== Most assists ===
- 2023–24 Joshua Adney (13 assists)

=== Most playing time ===
- 2023–24 Genridge Prijor (2616 minutes)

=== Notable former players ===
==== International ====
===== Women =====
- Nikki de Roest – after Heerjansdam and ASWH boys teams, played for RVVH and PSV/FC Eindhoven. Played on Netherlands U16 and U17. Later played futsal.

===== Men =====
- Arjan Human – played in ASWH 1 after RKC Waalwijk, ADO Den Haag, and Cercle Brugge
- Eric Abdul – played for DHC Delft, ASWH 1, SV Estrella, SV Dakota and the Aruba national football team
- Henrico Drost
- Ismaïl Yıldırım – played in ASWH after Kozakken Boys, RKC Waalwijk, Boluspor, and Menemen Belediyespor
- Jeffrey Altheer – played shortly in ASWH 1 after Feyenoord (bench only), Excelsior, Helmond, VVV, and Dutch national youth selections
- Ramon Hendriks, after ASWH youth played for Feyenoord and VfB Stuttgart
- Josimar Lima – played for ASWH after Willem II, Dordrecht, Al-Shaab, FC Emmen, FC Lahti, VVV, Netherlands U19, and Cape Verde national team
- Kenny Anderson – Played in ASWH 1 after RKC Waalwijk, Heart of Midlothian, and Quick Boys
- Marten de Roon – after ASWH youth, played for Feyenoord, Sparta Rotterdam, SC Heerenveen, Atalanta B.C., Middlesbrough F.C. and the Dutch national team
- Nixon Dias – played in Sparta Rotterdam, ADO Den Haag and Netherlands U-19, ASWH 1 and Dayton Dutch Lions FC
- Quentin Jakoba – joined ASWH 1 after FC Eindhoven and Kozakken Boys. Later in Curacao national football team
- Raymond de Waard – before ASWH 1 played for Excelsior Rotterdam, Norwich City, AZ Alkmaar, and RBC Roosendaal
- Robin Schmidt – after ASWH youth teams, played for Sparta Rotterdam, FC Twente, FC Dordrecht, and SuS Stadtlohn
- Silvino Soares – played for ASWH 1 after FC Zwolle, KV Red Star Waasland and the Cape Verde national football team
- Stef Doedee – played in Feyenoord, RKC Waalwijk, FC Dordrecht and FC Inter Turku before ASWH
- Stefan van Dam – played in ASWH 1 and the national amateur section after Willem II and TOP Oss.
- Shabir Isoufi – played for Feyenoord, Excelsior, FC Dordrecht, Telstar, and Barendrecht, then in ASWH 1 and the national team of Afghanistan
- Yuri Petrov – before ASWH 1 played for Spartak Moscow, Lokomotiv Moscow, Waalwijk, Twente, Den Haag, Metalist Kharkiv, and Volendam

==== Nationals ====
- Jacob van den Belt – played in ASWH 1 after RBC Roosendaal, VVV-Venlo, and DOTO
- Jordie van der Laan – on loan from Kozakken Boys after playing professional football at SC Telstar
- Joshua Brard – after playing in ASWH youth teams, played for Sparta Rotterdam (bench only), FC Oss and LRC Leerdam, before playing in ASWH 1
- Koen Wesdorp – played in ASWH after RBC Roosendaal, NAC Breda, Willem II, and Helmond Sport
- Leon van Dalen – played in ASWH 1 after FC Dordrecht (1988–2003) and TOP Oss (2003–2008)
- Mels van Driel – played 9 years in ASWH 1 after Excelsior, Fortuna Sittard and RBC Roosendaal

== Staff ==
| Position | Name |
|---|---|
| Chairperson | Joost Penning |
| Technical Manager | Mels van Driel |
| Head coach | Steye Jacobs |
| Assistant coach | Klaus Lingen |
| Goalkeeping | Jackson Rodrigues da Cruz |

=== Head coach ===
| Name | Years |
|---|---|
| Henk Zwang | 1950–1954 |
| Janus van der Gijp | 1954 |
| Floor de Zeeuw | 1954–1958 |
| Cor Scheurwater | 1958–1962 |
| Piet Confurius | 1962–1963 |
| Cor Scheurwater | 1963–1964 |
| Cees de Jong | 1964–1967 |
| Theo Smit | 1967–1968 |
| Ad de Bondt | 1968–1973 |
| Gerrit Wijngaard | 1973–1975 |
| Leo van Graafeiland | 1975–1978 |
| Roon Schleurholtz-Boerma | 1978–1979 |
| Henk van Osch | 1979–1984 |
| Cees van de Bosch | 1984–1986 |
| Gerard Weber | 1986–1988 |
| Cees van de Bosch | ad interim, 1988 |
| Arnold Lobman | 1988–1991 |
| René Vermunt | 1991–1993 |
| Arie van der Zouwen | 1993–1997 |
| Arie Romijn | 1997–1998 |
| Hans Maus | 1998–2000 |
| André Wetzel | 2000–2001 |
| Jack van den Berg | 2001–2006 |
| Bill Tukker | 2006–2008 |
| Henk Wisman | ad interim, 2008 |
| Dogan Corneille | ad interim, 2008 |
| Willem Leushuis | 2008–2010 |
| Fop Gouman | 2010–2011 |
| Ron Timmers | 2011–2013 |
| Michel Langerak | 2013–2015 |
| Joop Hiele | ad interim, 2015 |
| Jack van den Berg | 2015–2018 |
| Cesco Agterberg | 2018–2019 |
| Rogier Veenstra | 2019–2022 |
| Sjoerd van der Waal | 2022–2023 |
| Roy Brinkman | 2023–2025 |
| Steye Jacobs | 2025–2026 |
| Johan Sturrus | 2026– |

=== Goalkeeping coach ===
| Name | Years |
|---|---|
| Wim Berends | within the 2000s |
| Joop Hiele | 2012–2015 |
| John Bos | 2015–2023 |
| Gerard van der Borst | 2023–2025 |
| Jackson Rodrigues da Cruz | 2025– |

=== Assistant coach ===
- Ad de Bondt (within the 1980s)
- Ab Ritmeester (within the 1980s)
- Ton Stam (within the 2000s)
- Theo Smit (2006–2008)
- Dogan Corneille (2008–2009)
- Jeroen Rijsdijk (2009–2010)
- Theo Smit (2011–2013)
- Ed Ridderhof (2013–2015)
- Johan Sturrus (2015–2018)
- Ferry van Lare (2017–2018)
- Ed Ridderhof (2018–2019)
- Sjoerd van der Waal (2019–2022)
- Stefan van Dam (2022–2023)
- Klaus Lingen (2023–2026)
- Jerry Tieleman (2026–)

=== Technical manager ===
(this senior position is not always occupied)

- Wim Helmink (into the 2000s)
- Michel Devilee (one year in the 2000s)
- Mels van Driel (2020–)

=== Chairperson ===
- Bas van Wingerden (1929–1936)
- Harmen Haksteeg (1936–1939)
- Maarten Terlouw (1940–1942)
- Harmen Haksteeg (1942–1971)
- Frans van Son (1971–1979)
- Ger van der Straaten (1979–1981)
- Kees Zwijnenberg (1981–1886)
- John van Spronsen (1986–1992)
- Cor Scheurwater (1992–1998)
- Leo van den Berg (1998–2002)
- John Middendorp (2002–2014)
- Herman Jonker (2015–2018)
- John Middendorp (2019–2024)
- Joost Penning (2024–)

=== Honorary members ===
- Cor Scheurwater (1997)
- Wim Helmink (2008)
- John Middendorp (2014)
- Gerrit Scheurwater (2014)

== Derbies and rivalry ==
The name derby is always added to games against Ido's Football Club, the older and over the last decades less senior football club from Hendrik Ido Ambacht. Derby is also often used against other clubs from the (greater) region, such as Kozakken Boys, VV Capelle, VV Heerjansdam, Excelsior Maassluis, RVVH Ridderkerk, VV Rijsoord, VV Spijkenisse, Stedoco Hoornaar, Sparta Rotterdam and Pelikaan Zwijndrecht. The name Waaldorpenderby, Derby of Waal villages, is often used to describe games between ASWH and VV Heerjansdam, though it has been used also for matches between Heerjansdam and Rijsoord or between random villages along the "big" Waal.

ASWH has no rivalry. Historically VV Rijsoord, IFC and RVVH were rivals. More recently, it often competed with Kozakken Boys and FC Lisse for the same titles.

== Kit manufacturers and shirt sponsors ==
| Period | Kit Manufacturer | Period | Kit Sponsor |
|---|---|---|---|
| | | 19??–198? | Poelbouw |
| | | 198?–1989 | Verenigde Spaarbank |
| | | 1989–199? | TS Seeds |
| 199?– | Kappa | 1995–1998 | Bouwbedrijf Van Wingerden |
| | Kappa | 200?–2015 | Optima Hypotheken & Verzekeringen |
| | Kappa | 2015–2024 | Jordex |
| | Kappa | 2024– | Koolmees |
