= Jordy van de Corput =

Dutch footballer (born 1989)

Personal information
- Date of birth: 15 April 1989 (age 37)
- Place of birth: Rotterdam, Netherlands

Youth career
- Utrecht

Senior career*
Years	Team	Apps	(Gls)
2008–2009	Den Bosch	1	(0)
2009–2010	Dordrecht	0	(0)
2010–2013	ASWH		
2013–2014	Launceston City	3	(0)
2016	Džiugas Telšiai	23	(0)
2017–2018	Pakruojis	55	(0)
2019–2022	FK Akmené		
- * Club domestic league appearances and goals

Jordy van de Corput (born 15 April 1989 in Rotterdam) is a Dutch retired footballer who played in the position of goalkeeper.

== Club career ==
Visiting Launceston for four days in November 2016, van de Corput featured for City in a preseason friendly hosting Total Futbol International and agreed to a deal for the 2014 Victory League. Tipped to be one of the best in the league and making what was seen as an innumerable amount of saves in a friendly away to Glenorchy Knights, the Dutch goal minder picked up a suspension in the third round, a 3–7 rout by Devonport, missing the next game with Nick Abougelis taking his place.

From 2017 to 2018, van de Corput played with Pakruojis in the Lithuanian I Lyga.
