= Luis Pedro (footballer, born 1992) =

Angolan footballer

Personal information
- Full name: Luis Pedro da Silva Ferreira
- Date of birth: 6 January 1992 (age 34)
- Place of birth: Malanje, Angola
- Height: 1.84 m (6 ft 1/2 in)
- Position: Centre back

Youth career
- –2005: VV Helpman
- 2005–2010: Groningen

Senior career*
Years	Team	Apps	(Gls)
2010–2013	Groningen U21	21	(1)
2011–2012	Groningen	4	(0)
2012–2013	→ Veendam (loan)	23	(0)
2013–2015	Emmen	72	(3)
2015–2016	NAC Breda	32	(4)
2016–2017	De Graafschap	3	(0)
2018–2020	Leonidas		
2020–2021	Tsarsko Selo	21	(0)
2023–2026	ASWH	42	(2)
- * Club domestic league appearances and goals as of 4 August 2025

Luis Pedro da Silva Ferreira (born 6 January 1992) is an Angolan-Dutch professional footballer who plays as a centre back for Vierde Divisie club ASWH. Pedro is a resident of Rotterdam.

== Club career ==
=== Helpman, Groningen and Veendam ===
Pedro played in the youth of VV Helpman and transferred to the FC Groningen youth in 2005. He played for FC Groningen U21 and the first squad, where he had his Eredivisie debut in 2012 as a substitute. His three other games in the top team were full length.

During the 2012–13 season, Pedro was loaned to SC Veendam in the Eerste Divisie. Here Pedro became a base-team player. Coincidentally, Veendam went bankrupt before this season was over. After Veendam folded, Pedro played extra games for the FC Groningen U21 team until the season was really over.

=== Emmen, NAC and De Graafschap ===
A free player, Pedro transferred to the Eerste Divisie side FC Emmen, The Emmen stint lasted 2 seasons, during which he played 72 league games and also scored 3 goals. In 2015 he helped Emmen reach the promotion playoffs.

Next season, at NAC Breda, he was the only player not to miss any playing time in the league games of the 2015–16 season's first half. He also scored 4 goals. At the De Graafschap, in the 2016–2017 season, Pedro went to the opposite extreme of activity, playing only 3 games due to an injury.

=== Leonidas, Tsarsko Selo and ASWH ===
From 2018 to 2020, Pedro played for Hoofdklasse-side RKSV Leonidas of Rotterdam. During the 2020–21 season, he played for Tsarsko Selo Sofia, resulting in 21 caps in the Bulgarian First League.

A 2022 trial with Derde Divisie-side SteDoCo did not lead to a contract. In late 2022, Pedro started training at trailing Derde Divisie club ASWH, culminating in a contract from January to June 2023. It was renewed for 2023–24 season. In 2023–24, Pedro won a section championship and 3 trimester championships with ASWH.
