= Robin Schmidt =

Dutch footballer

Robin Schmidt (born 23 March 1965 in Hendrik-Ido-Ambacht) is a former Dutch professional footballer, notably for Sparta Rotterdam and FC Twente. He played both forward and midfield and scored in the 1984–85 UEFA Cup.

== Career ==
Initially, he played in ASWH youth teams, then moved on to Sparta Rotterdam youth.

From 1983 he played in Sparta Rotterdam's first squad. With Sparta, he competed for the UEFA Cup and on 18 September 1985 scored a goal in Sparta's 2–0 victory over Hamburger SV.

His soccer career next took him to FC Twente, FC Dordrecht, and the German club SuS Stadtlohn.

Later, he occasionally played in senior teams of FC Twente.
