= Mels van Driel =

Dutch footballer

Personal information
- Full name: Mels van Driel
- Date of birth: 2 February 1983 (age 43)
- Place of birth: Rotterdam, Netherlands
- Height: 1.85 m (6 ft 1 in)
- Position: Midfielder

Youth career
- Feyenoord

Senior career*
| Years | Team | Apps | (Gls) |
| 2002–2003 | Feyenoord | 0 | (0) |
| 2003–2005 | Excelsior | 65 | (1) |
| 2005–2007 | Fortuna Sittard | 83 | (0) |
| 2008–2011 | RBC | 72 | (1) |
| 2019–2020 | ASWH | 4 | (0) |

International career
| 1999-2000 | Netherlands U-17 | 12 | (0) |
| 2001 | Netherlands U-18 | 2 | (0) |
| 2001 | Netherlands U-19 | 6 | (0) |
| 2003 | Netherlands U-21 | 1 | (0) |
- * Club domestic league appearances and goals

Mels van Driel (born Rotterdam, 2 February 1983) is a Dutch retired footballer, now technical manager of ASWH.

== Club career ==
Van Driel played in the youth of Feyenoord and in Feyenoord's first squad in the Eredivisie (2002).

Van Driel then played for Eerste Divisie teams Excelsior (2003–2005), Fortuna Sittard (2005–2008) and RBC Roosendaal (2008–2011), for the latter 2 doubling as captain. At Fortuna Sittard he had asked a referee that an opponent from Helmond Sport would be given a yellow card, after which another Helmond Sporter "greeted" Van Driel with the Nazi salute.

From 2011 to 2020 Van Driel played for ASWH. In August 2020, after playing in the preparations for a new season, he quit active playing and became the technical manager of ASWH.

== International career ==
As an international, Van Driel played in the Netherlands national under-21 football team.

== Career statistics ==
| Season | Club | Caps | Goals | League |
|---|---|---|---|---|
| 2003/04 | (Netherlands) Excelsior | 35 | 1 | Eerste Divisie |
| 2004/05 | (Netherlands) Excelsior | 30 | 0 | Eerste Divisie |
| 2005/06 | (Netherlands) Fortuna Sittard | 32 | 0 | Eerste Divisie |
| 2006/07 | (Netherlands) Fortuna Sittard | 34 | 0 | Eerste Divisie |
| 2007/08 | (Netherlands) Fortuna Sittard | 17 | 0 | Eerste Divisie |
| 2007/08 | (Netherlands) RBC | 12 | 0 | Eerste Divisie |
| 2008/09 | (Netherlands) RBC | 30 | 1 | Eerste Divisie |
| 2009/10 | (Netherlands) RBC | 4 | 0 | Eerste Divisie |
| 2010/11 | (Netherlands) RBC | 26 | 0 | Eerste Divisie |
| Totals | | 220 | 2 | |
