= Leen van Steensel =

Dutch footballer and manager

Personal information
- Date of birth: 20 April 1984 (age 42)
- Place of birth: Rotterdam, Netherlands
- Position: Centre back

Team information
- Current team: FC Lisse (head coach)

Youth career
- 1990–1997: Moordrecht
- 1997–1999: Be Fair
- 1999–2003: Utrecht

Senior career*
Years	Team	Apps	(Gls)
2003–2007	Utrecht	19	(1)
2007	→ Carl Zeiss Jena (loan)	10	(0)
2007–2012	Excelsior	123	(11)
2012–2014	Capelle	46	(1)

Managerial career
- 2011–2012: ASW Waddinxveen
- 2014–2016: BGC Floreant
- 2019–2022: Jodan Boys
- 2022–2025: BVV Barendrecht
- 2025–: FC Lisse
- * Club domestic league appearances and goals

Leendert van Steensel (born 20 April 1984) is a Dutch football coach and former professional player who manages FC Lisse.

Van Steensel primarily played as a centre back for Utrecht, Carl Zeiss Jena, Excelsior and Capelle.

== Playing career ==
Born in Rotterdam, Van Steensel was three years old when his family moved from Oud-Beijerland to Moordrecht. There, he became a member of VV Moordrecht the age of six. Seven years later, his parents moved to Waddinxveen, and Van Steensel began playing for the local club, Be Fair. At age 15, he was scouted by FC Utrecht, and joined the youth academy of the club.

On 20 November 2003, he made his professional debut for FC Utrecht. On 5 January 2007, Utrecht announced that he would be loaned out to German club Carl Zeiss Jena for the remained of the season.

In May 2007, Van Steensel was signed by Excelsior. He initially signed a two-year contract, but this contract was later extended. In the 2011–12 season, Van Steensel, a central defender, appeared as a striker for a few games, which ensured his status as cult hero at the club. He scored twice that season, including a volley against De Graafschap. After the relegation of his club Excelsior, his contract was not extended. He subsequently began playing on an amateur deal at VV Capelle, where he played until 2013. In late 2013, Van Steensel announced his retirement, due to a recurring hernia.

== Managerial career ==
During his playing career, Van Steensel worked as a youth coach at ASW from his hometown Waddinxveen. There, he also coached the senior team. In February 2014, he was appointed head coach of BGC Floreant. He began combining his position as head coach at Floreant with a role as assistant coach at Jong Sparta in August 2015. He would since have other roles within the Sparta organization, including team manager and match analyst.

In December 2018, Van Steensel was appointed the new head coach of CVV de Jodan Boys, where he would take over the reins from the start of the 2019–20 season. Prior to the appointment, Van Steensel had worked as a head coach of the club's second team. He signed a contract extension on 31 January 2020.

In December 2021 it was announced that he would become the new manager of BVV Barendrecht for the 2022–23 season.

In November 2024 he was appointed head coach of FC Lisse for the 2025-26 season.
