= Henk Wisman =

Dutch football manager (born 1957)

Personal information
- Date of birth: 19 May 1957 (age 69)
- Place of birth: Amsterdam, Netherlands
- Position: Midfielder

Youth career
- Ajax

Senior career*
Years	Team	Apps	(Gls)
1975–1979	FC Amsterdam		
1979–1980	SC Amersfoort		

Managerial career
- 2000–2004: FC Volendam
- 2004–2005: Den Bosch
- 2005–2006: Armenia
- 2005–2006: FC Pyunik
- 2007–2008: Fortuna Sittard
- 2008: ASWH
- 2008–2011: Almere City
- 2013: Chiangrai United
- 2014–2019: Ter Leede
- 2019–: Rijnsburgse Boys
- * Club domestic league appearances and goals

Henk Wisman (born 19 May 1957) is a Dutch football manager. He who was the coach of the Armenia national football team for about a year.

== Club career ==
Wisman was born in Amsterdam. He began his career at AFC Ajax, having played in their youth system. He gained international experience as a young player and as a member of the Dutch Under-16, Under-17, Under-18 and Under-21 teams. Wisman did secure a place in the first team of Ajax. After eight years at Ajax, Wisman left the club in 1975 and went on to play at FC Amsterdam and SC Amersfoort (until 1980). He continued as a player-coach at amateur level for a short while.

== Coaching career ==
Wisman went on to spend 19 years working with amateur clubs in the Netherlands, before taking over as head coach of FC Volendam in 2000, and later to FC Den Bosch.

Wisman was appointed to the role in May 2005, replacing Bernard Casoni. In addition to his role as an international coach, Wisman also coaches Armenian club side FC Pyunik, leading them to their fifth successive league title at the end of the 2005 season.

On 7 April 2006, Wisman was fired from Armenia national team manager position. During the 2006–07 winter he also left his job as Pyunik manager and returned to the Netherlands, signing for Fortuna Sittard. There he was sacked on 15 December 2007 due to, according to the club, a poor relationship with the squad.

A few months later he was appointed manager of FC Omniworld.
