= Stanley Brard =

Dutch footballer and manager

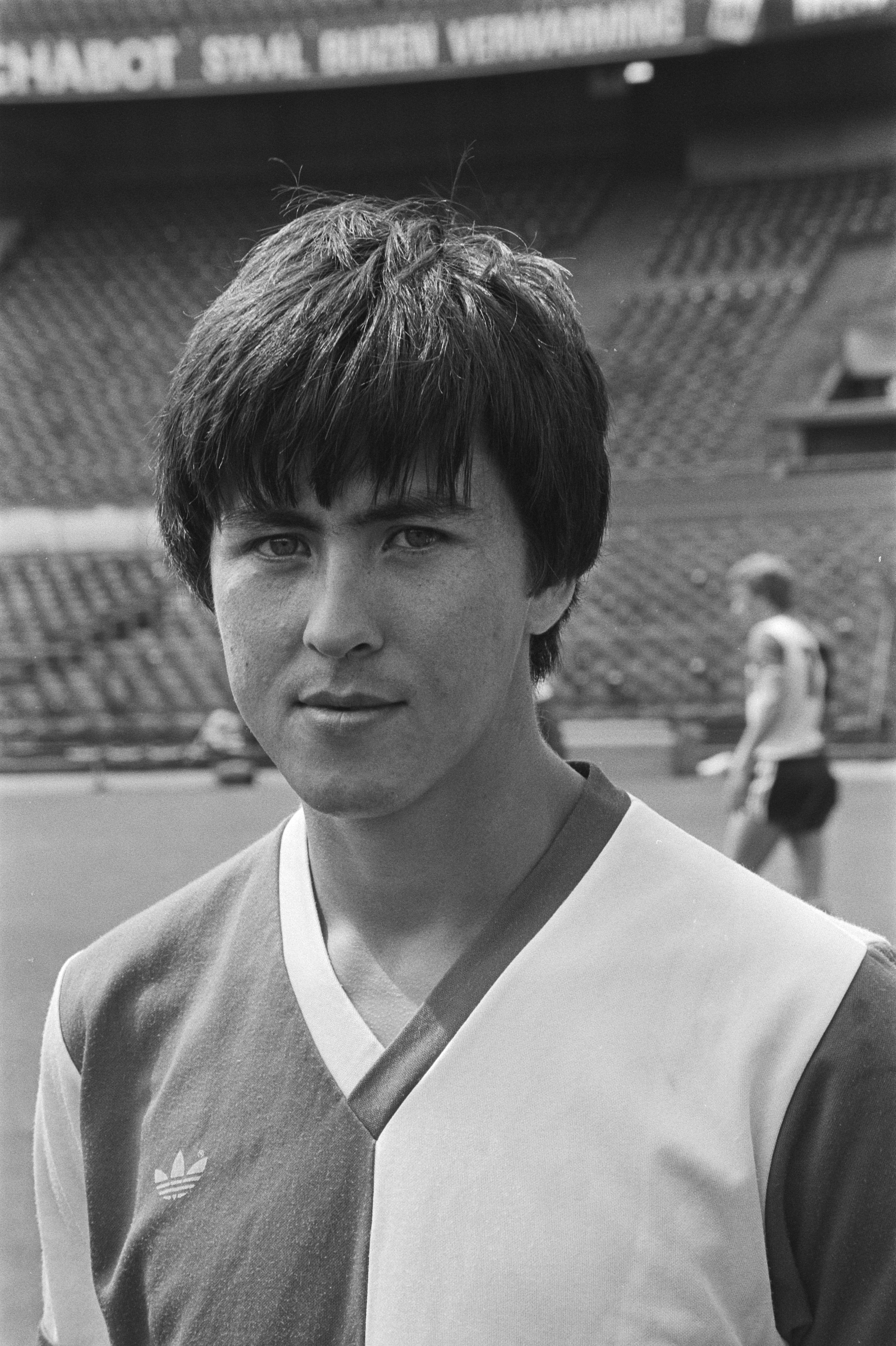
- Brard in 1982

Personal information
- Full name: Stanley Brard
- Date of birth: 24 October 1958 (age 68)
- Place of birth: The Hague, Netherlands
- Position: Leftback

Team information
- Current team: Feyenoord (Head of Feyenoord Academy)

Youth career
- LENS
- Feyenoord

Senior career*
Years	Team	Apps	(Gls)
1976–1986	Feyenoord	208	(10)
1986–1992	RKC	184	(22)
Total		392	(32)

Managerial career
- 2000–2001: ADO Den Haag
- * Club domestic league appearances and goals

Stanley Brard (born 24 October 1958, in The Hague) is a retired Dutch footballer who was active as a left back and who is currently Head of the Feyenoord Academy.

== Playing career ==
=== Club ===
Brard started his career in his town of birth, The Hague where he played for RKSV Lenig en Snel (LENS). He was spotted by scouts of Eredivisie side Feyenoord Rotterdam and joined the youth squads of this team. A few years later, in 1977 he made his debut in the first team of the club in a match against FC Twente. In the following years Brard became a decent fullback and was often in the starting line-up. The best achievements in his career came in the 1983-84 season when Johan Cruyff joined Feyenoord. In that season, at Cruyff's instigation, Brard was moved from the left back position to a position in front of Cruyff, to keep the opposition's right back from making incursions into the Feyenoord half. That year, Feyenoord won both the championship as well as the KNVB Cup.

Two years later Brard found himself on the bench more and more. It was time to leave the club. His next mission was at RKC Waalwijk, a club that recently had promoted to the Eerste Divisie and were ambitious to become an Eredivisie side. Brard became a key factor in this team and in the 1987-88 season RKC were the Eerste Divisie champions and promoted to the Eredivisie (to only relegate again in the 2006-07 season). In the Eredivisie Brard was a key player of the team for three more years before he was no longer chosen in the starting line-ups, in his last two seasons of his career he only played seventeen matches.

== Managerial career ==
After his career Brard became a manager and joined Vitesse where he became a youth coach as well as the coach of the second team for four years. He then switched to ADO Den Haag to become their manager in the 2000–01 and 2001-02 seasons. He later was a technical director at the team. In December 2001 Brard left ADO Den Haag to become a youth coach at Nagoya Grampus Eight in Japan. He remained in this function until February 2005 when Feyenoord's technical director Wim Jansen convinced him to become academy boss at the club.

Brard left Feyenoord for Azeri side Qabala to become their academy director between April 2013 and December 2015, when it was announced he would be joining Japanese side Nagoya Grampus as sports director in January 2016.

On 27 December 2018, Feyenoord announced that Brard would return to the club as Head of the Feyenoord Academy.

== Personal life ==
His cousin Patty is a singer, TV icon and playmate, while his son Joshua played professionally at TOP Oss.
