= Arie van der Zouwen =

Dutch football coach

Arie van der Zouwen is a retired Dutch football coach and player. He was the manager of the Hong Kong national team, assistant manager and caretaker manager of Al Wahda FC, and managed many Dutch teams. Van der Zouwen resides in Kortgene.

== Football career ==
Originally from Dordrecht, Van der Zouwen was in the 1980s a frequent scorer for the local EBOH squad. This was well after EBOH had returned to become an amateur football club.

Van der Zouwen interned in coaching at FC Den Bosch. The Dutch clubs he coached are VVGZ (multiple runs), ASWH (1993–1997), VV Strijen (1997–1998), BVV Barendrecht (2004), VV Capelle (2005–2006), VV Dubbeldam (2010–2011?), VV Dongen (2011–2013), VV Kloetinge (2015–2017), MZC '11 (2017–2018), and Tholense Boys (2021–2023). In between, from 2000 to 2001 Van der Zouwen coached the Hong Kong national team. Subsequently he was assistant manager for Jo Bonfrère at the United Arab Emirates side Al Wahda FC and briefly was Al Wahda's manager.
