= Stef Doedée =

Dutch former professional footballer

Personal information
- Date of birth: 17 February 1987 (age 39)
- Place of birth: Berlicum, Netherlands
- Position: Goalkeeper

Team information
- Current team: ASWH (goalkeeping coach)

Youth career
- 2001–2007: Feyenoord

Senior career*
Years	Team	Apps	(Gls)
2007–2009	RKC	0	(0)
2009–2012	Dordrecht	64	(0)
2012	Inter Turku	9	(0)
2013	Dordrecht	7	(0)
2013–2019	ASWH		
2019–2021	Smitshoek		
Total		80+	(0+)
- * Club domestic league appearances and goals

Stef Doedée (born 17 February 1987) is a Dutch football coach and former professional player who is a goalkeeping coach at ASWH.

Doedée played as a goalkeeper for Feyenoord, RKC Waalwijk, FC Dordrecht, Inter Turku, ASWH and VV Smitshoek.

== Playing career ==
Doedée played in the Netherlands for Feyenoord, RKC Waalwijk and Dordrecht. He signed for Finnish club Inter Turku in August 2012, signing a contract until end of season 2012. From 2013 he was under contract at ASWH with which he ascended to the Derde Divisie (2016) and Tweede Divisie (2019). He did not actually play in the Tweede Divisie as he had previously signed to transfer to Hoofdklasse-side VV Smitshoek.

== Coaching career ==
Immediately after ending his player career in 2021, he signed as goalkeeping coach for the 2nd, U23, and U19 teams of ASWH.
