= VV Heerjansdam =

Dutch football club

- Full name: Voetbalvereniging Heerjansdam
- Founded: 13 June 1945
- Ground: De Molenwei, Heerjansdam
- Chairman: Adriaan van Peenen
- Manager: Jonathan Jonk (since 2020)
- League: Eerste Klasse Saturday C (2019–20)
- Website: http://www.vvheerjansdam.nl/
Home colours

VV Heerjansdam is a football club from Heerjansdam, Netherlands. Heerjansdam is playing in the Saturday Eerste Klasse League since 2017.

Heerjansdam was the Dutch amateur champions of Saturday football in 1989. In 1986 Heerjansdam became champions in the Saturday Eerste Klasse A. At the time, the Eerste Klasse was the highest league for amateur teams.

In 1984, Heerjansdam defeated Eredivisie-side FC Groningen (3–2) in the first round of the 1984–85 KNVB Cup. In the second round, Heerjansdam was eliminated by Ajax (6–0).

== Associated people ==
=== Former players ===
- Railey Martijn – Bonaire international footballer
- Prince Polley – Ghanaian footballer
- Nikki de Roest – Former Dutch international and Women's Eredivisie player. She played on a boys team in Heerjansdam.

=== Managers ===
- 1988–89: René Vermunt
- 1999–2001: Pieter de Jongh
- 2019–20: Ron Timmers
- Since 2020: Jonathan Jonk
