= VV Sliedrecht =

Dutch football club

- Full name: Voetbalvereniging Sliedrecht
- Founded: 1 March 1912
- Ground: Sportpark De Lockhorst, Sliedrecht
- League: Eerste Klasse Saturday C (2019–20)
- Website: http://www.vvsliedrecht.nl/
Home colours

VV Sliedrecht is a football club from Sliedrecht, Netherlands. VV Sliedrecht plays in the 2019–20 season in Saturday Eerste Klasse C.

In recent years, VV Sliedrecht plays mostly in the Eerste Klasse. In 2016, it was runner up in the Eerste Klasse after narrowly losing the championship to SV DFS. Sliedrecht nevertheless made it to the Hoofdklasse through playoffs and relegated after just one season.

== Former players ==
- Mohamed Sharif - Somalia international
- Stefan van Dam – youth, then 1st section 2011–2017
