= BVV Barendrecht =

Dutch football club

- Full name: Barendrechtse Voetbalvereniging Barendrecht
- Nickname: Rood-Witte (Red-Whites)
- Founded: 12 February 1926; 100 years ago
- Ground: Sportpark De Bongerd
- Capacity: 1,500
- Chairman: Martin Seltenrijch
- Manager: Damiano Vaudo
- League: Tweede Divisie
- 2025–26: Tweede Divisie, 12th of 18
Home colours	Away colours

Barendrechtse Voetbalvereniging Barendrecht, commonly known as BVV Barendrecht, is a football club from Barendrecht, Netherlands. The club was founded on 12 February 1926 and plays its matches at Sportpark de Bongerd. With more than 2,000 members, Barendrecht is one of the largest amateur clubs of the Netherlands in membership.

== History ==
=== 1960s–1970s: Vierde, Derde, and Tweede Klasse ===
From 1961 to 1977, Barendrecht played mostly in the Derde Klasse. The first two seasons were in the Vierde Klasse and the last two in the Tweede Klasse. In 1969–70, too, BVV played in the Tweede Klasse.

=== 1980s–2000s: Eerste Klasse and Hoofdklasse ===
From 1977 to 1996, Barendrecht played in the Eerste Klasse, with the exception of one year back in Tweede Klasse. It immediately bounced back with a section championship.

From 1996 to 2010, BVV played in the Hoofdklasse, with the exception of three years back in the Eerste Klasse.

=== 2010s–2020s: Derde and Tweede Divisie ===
BVV has played in the Topklasse since the inauguration in 2010 until 2016, by which time the league was already known as Derde Divisie. From 2016 until 2019 the club played in the Tweede Divisie. In 2018 Barendrecht was managed by Albert van der Dussen who was let go and replaced in January 2019 by Jack van den Berg. Finishing dead last in the Tweede Divisie it automatically relegated to the Derde. In 2024 it is back in the Tweede Divisie. Finishing the season 9th, it will continue in the Tweede Divisie.

== Current squad ==
As of 24 October 2026

Note: Flags indicate national team as defined under FIFA eligibility rules; some limited exceptions apply. Players may hold more than one non-FIFA nationality.

No.	Pos.	Nation	Player
1	GK	NED	Bradly van der Meer
2	DF	NED	Jay Brand
3	DF	NED	Timo de Graaf
4	DF	NED	Veron Knol
5	DF	NED	Nadir Jouhri
6	MF	NED	Taner Bayram
7	MF	NED	Danny Monster
8	MF	NED	Orlano Stewart
9	FW	NED	Brent Vugts
10	MF	NED	Eric Fortes
11	FW	NED	Aness Serghini
12	DF	NED	Constantijn Schop

No.	Pos.	Nation	Player
14	MF	NED	Omar Jamil
15	DF	NED	Kevin Rook
16	MF	NED	Mikail El Mahdioui
17	DF	NED	Joshua Kieboom
20	GK	NED	Wouter van der Borch
21	FW	NED	Olek Mrowicki
23	FW	NED	Finn Hooreman
24	MF	NED	Redouan Omar Ouali
25	MF	NED	Ryniño Rimon
26	FW	NED	Marouane Bakour
30	GK	NED	Nigel Keehnen

== Historical list of coaches ==
- (Netherlands) Gidi Jacobs (1964–1967)
- (Netherlands) Jan Leermakers (1967–19??)
- (Netherlands) Daan den Bleijker (1973–197?)
- (Hungary) Sándor Popovics (1978–1980)
- (Netherlands) Cor van der Gijp (1980–1982)
- (Netherlands) Rob Theuns (1987–1988)
- (Netherlands) Martin van der Kooij (1993–1995)
- (Netherlands) Ronald Klinkerberg (1997–2001)
- (Netherlands) Steef Buijs (2002–2004)
- (Netherlands) Arie van der Zouwen (2004)
- (Netherlands) Ruud Heus (2004–2006)
- (Netherlands) René Vermunt (2006)
- (Netherlands) Jack van den Berg (2006–2015)
- (Netherlands) Adrie Poldervaart (2015–2018)
- (Netherlands) Albert van der Dussen (2018)
- (Netherlands) Jermaine Sandvliet (2018, a.i.)
- (Netherlands) Jack van den Berg (2019–2020)
- (Netherlands) Richard Elzinga (2020–2022)
- (Netherlands) Leen van Steensel (2022–2024)
- (Netherlands) Dogan Corneille (2025–2026)
- (Netherlands) Damiano Vaudo (2026–)

== Competition results ==
=== 1961–2010 ===
2; 4D	1; 4D	7; 3A	8; 3A	6; 3B	9; 3B	6; 3B	1; 3B	12; 2B	10; 3B	10; 3B	6; 3B	6; 3B	1; 3B	2; 2B	1; 2A	10; 1A	5; 1B	6; 1A	3; 1A	5; 1A	4; 1A	4; 1A	8; 1A	3; 1A	7; 1A	7; 1B	11; 1A	12; 1A	8; 1B	13; 1A	1; 2B	8; 1B	4; 1A	11; 1B	8; B	1; B	7; A	7; A	10; A	7; B	14; B	1; 1B	12; A	3; 1B	1; 1B	8; A	3; A	1; A
62	63	64	65	66	67	68	69	70	71	72	73	74	75	76	77	78	79	80	81	82	83	84	85	86	87	88	89	90	91	92	93	94	95	96	97	98	99	00	01	02	03	04	05	06	07	08	09	10

=== Since 2010 ===
9	12	2	11	4	5	8	4	18	~~7~~	~~7~~	8	5	1; B	9	–
11	12	13	14	15	16	17	18	19	20	21	22	23	24	25	26

Legend

Seasons per league

5 Tweede Divisie
10 Derde Divisie
11 Hoofdklasse
21 Eerste Klasse
4 Tweede Klasse
11 Derde Klasse
2 Vierde Klasse

– broken off, not started
* ongoing
