= LRC Leerdam =

Dutch football club

- Full name: Leerdamse Racing Club uit Leerdam
- Founded: 20 February 1958
- Ground: Bruinsdeel, Leerdam
- Chairman: Raf Montezinos
- Manager: Emanuel Sluis
- League: Eerste Klasse Saturday D (2022–23)
Home colours	Away colours

Leerdamse Racing Club uit Leerdam, known as LRC Leerdam, is a football club from Leerdam, Netherlands. The club was founded in 1958. The first male squad plays in the Eerste Klasse since 2016, when it relegated after a year in the Hoofdklasse.
