= SC Feyenoord =

Association football club in Rotterdam, Netherlands

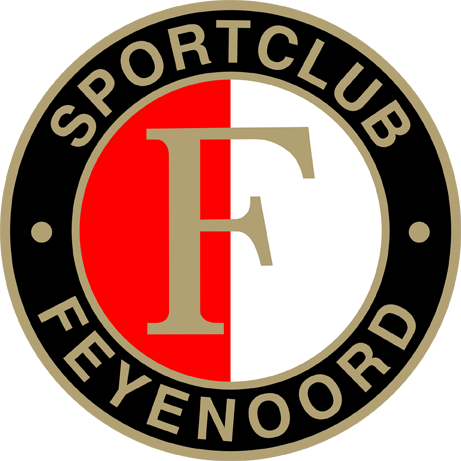
- Full name: Sportclub Feyenoord
- Founded: 27 August 1908; 116 years ago
- Ground: Varkenoord, Rotterdam
- Capacity: 2,500
- Chairman: Arjan van der Graaff
- Manager: Richard Elzinga
- League: Vierde Divisie
- 2022–23: Saturday Vierde Divisie A, 12th of 16
- Website: sportclubfeyenoord.com
Home colours	Away colours

Sportclub Feyenoord, also known as Feyenoord AV, is a football club based in Rotterdam, Netherlands. The amateur branch of professional football club Feyenoord, it is currently members of the Vierde Divisie, the fifth tier of the Dutch football league system. SC Feyenoord play its home matches at Varkenoord.

Feyenoord split its professional and amateur branches in 1978. Until the 2012–13 season, the amateur team played its matches in Sunday amateur football.

The club became champions of the 1995–96 Sunday Hoofdklasse A. At the time, the Hoofdklasse was the highest league of Dutch Sunday amateur football.

== Managers ==
- Cesco Agterberg (2015–2017)
- Richard Elzinga
