= 2017–18 in Dutch football =

Football in Netherlands
- Season: 2017–18

Men's football
- Eredivisie: PSV Eindhoven
- KNVB Cup: Feyenoord
- Johan Cruyff Shield: Feyenoord

The 2017–18 season was the 129th season of competitive football in the Netherlands.

== Promotion and relegation ==
=== Pre-season ===
League	Promoted to league	Relegated from league
Eredivisie	VVV-Venlo; NAC Breda	NEC; Go Ahead Eagles
Eerste Divisie	Jong AZ	Achilles '29
Tweede Divisie	IJsselmeervogels; De Dijk; Lisse; Rijnsburgse Boys	UNA; Spakenburg; Jong Vitesse; Jong FC Twente
Derde Divisie	Spijkenisse; ACV; DOVO; ADO '20; De Meern; Blauw Geel '38; Quick (H)	SteDoCo; Huizen; Rijnvogels; Juliana '31; Jong Den Bosch; UDI '19; Jong Achilles '29

== League season ==
=== Eredivisie ===
Pos	Team	Pld	W	D	L	GF	GA	GD	Pts	Qualification or relegation
1	PSV Eindhoven (C)	34	26	5	3	87	39	+48	83	Qualification to Champions League play-off round
2	Ajax	34	25	4	5	89	33	+56	79	Qualification to Champions League second qualifying round
3	AZ	34	22	5	7	72	38	+34	71	Qualification to Europa League second qualifying round
4	Feyenoord	34	20	6	8	76	39	+37	66	Qualification to Europa League third qualifying round (Note: Feyenoord qualified for the Europa League third qualifying round by winning the 2017–18 KNVB Cup.)
5	Utrecht	34	14	12	8	58	53	+5	54	Qualification to European competition play-offs (Note: Four teams play for a spot in the 2018–19 UEFA Europa League second qualifying round.)
6	Vitesse (O)	34	13	10	11	63	47	+16	49	Qualification to European competition play-offs
7	ADO Den Haag	34	13	8	13	45	53	−8	47	Qualification to European competition play-offs
8	Heerenveen	34	12	10	12	48	53	−5	46	Qualification to European competition play-offs
9	PEC Zwolle	34	12	8	14	42	54	−12	44	
10	Heracles Almelo	34	11	9	14	50	64	−14	42	
11	Excelsior	34	11	7	16	41	56	−15	40	
12	Groningen	34	8	14	12	50	50	0	38	
13	Willem II	34	10	7	17	50	63	−13	37	
14	NAC Breda	34	9	7	18	41	57	−16	34	
15	VVV-Venlo	34	7	13	14	35	54	−19	34	
16	Roda JC Kerkrade (R)	34	8	6	20	42	69	−27	30	Qualification for the Relegation play-offs (Note: Ten teams, two from the Eredivisie and eight from the Eerste Divisie, play for two spots in the 2018–19 Eredivisie. The remaining eight teams play in the 2018–19 Eerste Divisie.)
17	Sparta Rotterdam (R)	34	7	6	21	34	75	−41	27	Qualification for the Relegation play-offs
18	Twente (Note: Twente We're put at the bottom of the league at the start of the season and were excluded from European football for 3 years on 15 December 2015.) (R)	34	5	9	20	37	63	−26	24	Relegation to Eerste Divisie

Source: eredivisie.nl
Rules for classification: 1) Points; 2) Goal difference; 3) Goals scored; 4) Head-to-head points; 5) Head-to-head goal difference; 6) Head-to-head away goals scored; 7) Play-off if relevant for deciding champion, relegation or participating in a European league, otherwise by draw. 8) Penalty shoot-out (only after a play-off)
(C) Champions; (O) Play-off winners; (R) Relegated

=== Eerste divisie ===
Pos	Team	Pld	W	D	L	GF	GA	GD	Pts	Promotion, qualification or relegation
1	Jong Ajax (Note: Reserves teams aren't eligible to be promoted to the Eredivisie.) (C)	38	25	4	9	89	54	+35	79	
2	Fortuna Sittard (Note: Winner of the Second and Fourth Period (games 12-20 and 30-38).) (P)	38	24	6	8	81	41	+40	78	Promotion to the Eredivisie
3	NEC (Note: Winner of the First Period (games 3-11).)	38	22	8	8	82	46	+36	74	Qualification to promotion play-offs Second round
4	De Graafschap (O, P)	38	18	11	9	78	47	+31	65	Qualification to promotion play-offs Second round
5	Jong PSV	38	19	7	12	76	54	+22	64	
6	Telstar	38	16	13	9	66	63	+3	61	Qualification to promotion play-offs Second round
7	Emmen (O, P)	38	14	16	8	58	50	+8	58	Qualification to promotion play-offs Second round
8	Cambuur	38	16	10	12	58	53	+5	58	Qualification to promotion play-offs First round
9	Almere City	38	15	7	16	70	76	−6	52	Qualification to promotion play-offs First round
10	MVV	38	14	8	16	57	56	+1	50	Qualification to promotion play-offs First round
11	Den Bosch	38	12	11	15	59	55	+4	47	
12	Eindhoven	38	14	5	19	61	83	−22	47	
13	Dordrecht (Note: Winner of the Third Period (games 21-29).)	38	14	5	19	57	81	−24	47	Qualification to promotion play-offs First round
14	Volendam	38	13	7	18	59	67	−8	46	
15	Oss	38	12	10	16	53	65	−12	46	
16	Jong AZ	38	14	4	20	57	70	−13	46	
17	Go Ahead Eagles	38	9	10	19	48	68	−20	37	
18	RKC Waalwijk	38	8	13	17	37	61	−24	37	
19	Helmond Sport	38	9	9	20	50	67	−17	36	
20	Jong FC Utrecht (R)	38	7	6	25	37	76	−39	27	Relegation to the Tweede Divisie

Source: Soccerway, Jupiler League (in Dutch)
Rules for classification: Season in progress: 1) Most points won; 2) Less points lost; 3) Goal difference; 4) Goals scored; 5) Alphabetical order. End of season: 1) Points; 2) Goal difference; 3) Goals scored; 4) Head-to-head points; 5) Head-to-head goal difference; 6) Head-to-head away goals scored; 7) Play-off if relevant for deciding champion, relegation, international competitions and play-offs qualification, otherwise by draw. 8) Penalty shoot-out (only after a play-off)
(C) Champions; (O) Play-off winners; (P) Promoted; (R) Relegated

=== Tweede Divisie ===
Pos	Team	Pld	W	D	L	GF	GA	GD	Pts	Promotion, qualification or relegation
1	Katwijk (C)	34	23	3	8	67	33	+34	72	Champion
2	Kozakken Boys	34	21	7	6	74	34	+40	70	
3	HHC	34	18	5	11	77	56	+21	59	
4	Barendrecht	34	18	5	11	64	57	+7	59	
5	Rijnsburgse Boys	34	17	5	12	60	63	−3	56	
6	GVVV	34	16	6	12	54	44	+10	54	
7	Excelsior Maassluis	34	13	12	9	43	30	+13	51	
8	VVSB	34	14	9	11	47	54	−7	51	
9	IJsselmeervogels	34	13	10	11	59	45	+14	49	
10	Koninklijke HFC	34	13	9	12	55	46	+9	48	
11	Jong Sparta	34	12	7	15	72	64	+8	43	
12	AFC	34	12	7	15	45	56	−11	43	
13	De Treffers	34	11	8	15	51	55	−4	41	
14	Lienden	34	12	5	17	52	67	−15	41	
15	Lisse (R)	34	12	4	18	48	57	−9	40	Qualification to relegation play-offs
16	TEC (R)	34	11	5	18	53	66	−13	38	Qualification to relegation play-offs
17	ASV De Dijk (R)	34	10	0	24	50	85	−35	30	Relegation to Derde Divisie
18	Achilles '29 (Note: On 24 January 2018 Achilles '29 were deducted one point for not having their budget for the 2017/2018 season in order. On 16 March 2018 they were deducted another 3 points for failing to pay employees, 1 point for failing to pay the Tax and Customs Administration and another point for owing money to another club.) (R)	34	5	3	26	41	100	−59	12	Relegation to Derde Divisie

Source: Soccerway
Rules for classification: 1) points; 2) goal difference; 3) number of goals scored
(C) Champions; (R) Relegated

=== Derde Divisie ===
==== Saturday League ====
Pos	Team	Pld	W	D	L	GF	GA	GD	Pts	Promotion, qualification or relegation
1	SV Spakenburg (C, P)	34	22	5	7	68	32	+36	71	Promotion to Tweede Divisie
2	Scheveningen (Note: Winner of the Second Period (games 13-23).) (O, P)	34	20	5	9	68	44	+24	65	Qualification to promotion play-offs
3	DVS '33	34	19	5	10	74	37	+37	62	
4	Jong Almere City (Note: Winner of the First Period (games 1-12).) (O, P)	34	18	7	9	73	54	+19	61	Qualification to promotion play-offs
5	Jong Groningen	34	17	7	10	72	34	+38	58	
6	Quick Boys	34	18	4	12	63	45	+18	58	
7	Jong Volendam (Note: Winner of the Third Period (games 24-34).)	34	18	2	14	60	48	+12	56	Qualification to promotion play-offs
8	ODIN '59	34	14	7	13	56	51	+5	49	
9	DOVO	34	13	10	11	54	52	+2	49	
10	Jong Twente	34	14	6	14	52	45	+7	48	
11	ASWH	34	12	11	11	52	51	+1	47	
12	Harkemase Boys	34	14	4	16	55	56	−1	46	
13	VVOG	34	11	9	14	36	51	−15	42	
14	ONS Sneek	34	10	7	17	62	88	−26	37	
15	Capelle (R)	34	9	8	17	44	57	−13	35	Qualification to relegation play-offs
16	VV Spijkenisse (R)	34	7	12	15	56	83	−27	33	Qualification to relegation play-offs
17	ACV (R)	34	9	5	20	57	83	−26	32	Relegation to Hoofdklasse
18	Magreb '90 (Note: Magreb '90 were deducted three points for no certified youth training and not having three registered contracted players. They were deducted an additional point for still not meeting the same criteria on February 8, 2018. On top on that they were deducted three more points for not meeting the criteria regarding the annual financial report.) (R)	34	2	4	28	31	122	−91	3	Relegation to Hoofdklasse

Source: Soccerway
Rules for classification: 1) points; 2) goal difference; 3) number of goals scored
(C) Champions; (O) Play-off winners; (P) Promoted; (R) Relegated

==== Sunday League ====
Pos	Team	Pld	W	D	L	GF	GA	GD	Pts	Promotion, qualification or relegation
1	Jong Vitesse (Note: Winner of the Third Period (games 24-34).) (C, P)	34	23	6	5	96	36	+60	75	Promotion to Tweede Divisie
2	UNA (Note: Winner of the First Period (games 1-12).)	34	22	5	7	74	38	+36	71	Qualification to promotion play-offs
3	Quick (H) (Note: Substitute winner of the Third Period (games 24-34).)	34	18	9	7	74	58	+16	63	Qualification to promotion play-offs
4	Dongen	34	17	4	13	61	65	−4	55	
5	Westlandia	34	17	3	14	77	74	+3	54	
6	OFC (Note: OFC were deducted one point for not supplying the annual report in time.)	34	14	11	9	64	47	+17	52	
7	ADO '20	34	14	10	10	76	70	+6	52	
8	JVC Cuijk (Note: Winner of the Second Period (games 13-23).)	34	15	5	14	60	58	+2	50	Qualification to promotion play-offs
9	USV Hercules	34	14	7	13	63	59	+4	49	
10	Blauw Geel '38	34	14	5	15	60	62	−2	47	
11	OJC Rosmalen	34	14	5	15	52	61	−9	47	
12	HBS Craeyenhout	34	11	7	16	43	43	0	40	
13	EVV	34	11	6	17	32	48	−16	39	
14	HSC '21	34	11	5	18	44	57	−13	38	
15	Quick '20 (O)	34	11	5	18	52	67	−15	38	Qualification to relegation play-offs
16	Be Quick 1887 (R)	34	9	6	19	61	85	−24	33	Qualification to relegation play-offs
17	Jong De Graafschap (R)	34	8	8	18	48	61	−13	32	Relegation to Hoofdklasse
18	De Meern (R)	34	6	7	21	28	76	−48	25	Relegation to Hoofdklasse

Source: Soccerway
Rules for classification: 1) points; 2) goal difference; 3) number of goals scored
(C) Champions; (O) Play-off winners; (P) Promoted; (R) Relegated

=== Hoofdklasse ===
==== Saturday A League ====
Pos	Team	Pld	W	D	L	GF	GA	GD	Pts	Promotion, qualification or relegation
1	Noordwijk (Note: Winner of the First Period (games 1-10).) (C, P)	30	22	3	5	89	33	+56	69	Promotion to 2018–19 Derde Divisie Saturday
2	Ter Leede (Note: Winner of the Second Period (games 11-20).)	30	20	2	8	70	43	+27	62	Qualification for 2018–19 Derde Divisie play-offs
3	SteDoCo (Note: Winner of the Third Period (games 21-30).) (O, P)	30	17	9	4	61	32	+29	60	Qualification for 2018–19 Derde Divisie play-offs
4	Hoek (Note: Substitute winner of the First Period (games 1-10).) (O, P)	30	16	7	7	63	41	+22	55	Qualification for 2018–19 Derde Divisie play-offs
5	Achilles Veen	30	16	6	8	48	34	+14	54	
6	Rijnvogels	30	12	8	10	47	41	+6	44	
7	's-Gravenzande	30	13	4	13	69	61	+8	43	
8	Jodan Boys	30	12	6	12	53	46	+7	42	
9	Zwaluwen	30	10	10	10	49	54	−5	40	
10	Swift	30	10	7	13	40	54	−14	37	
11	Smitshoek	30	9	7	14	47	59	−12	34	
12	Nootdorp	30	10	2	18	35	67	−32	32	
13	AFC (R)	30	8	6	16	56	69	−13	30	Qualification to relegation play-offs
14	Rijsoord (R)	30	7	8	15	33	57	−24	29	Qualification to relegation play-offs
15	RVVH (R)	30	6	6	18	24	55	−31	24	Relegation to 2018–19 Eerste Klasse
16	Argon (R)	30	4	5	21	32	70	−38	17	Relegation to 2018–19 Eerste Klasse

Source: Soccerway
Rules for classification: 1) points; 2) goal difference; 3) number of goals scored
(C) Champions; (O) Play-off winners; (P) Promoted; (R) Relegated

==== Saturday B League ====
Pos	Team	Pld	W	D	L	GF	GA	GD	Pts	Promotion, qualification or relegation
1	Eemdijk (Note: Winner of the Second Period (games 11-20).) (C, P)	30	17	7	6	63	33	+30	58	Promotion to 2018–19 Derde Divisie Saturday
2	Berkum (Note: Substitute winner of the Second Period (games 11-20).)	30	17	5	8	52	36	+16	56	Qualification for 2018–19 Derde Divisie play-offs
3	Genemuiden	30	16	6	8	74	45	+29	54	
4	Ajax (amateurs) (Note: Winner of the Third Period (games 21-30).) (O, P)	30	16	6	8	69	45	+24	54	Qualification for 2018–19 Derde Divisie play-offs
5	Staphorst	30	12	10	8	55	44	+11	46	
6	Urk	30	13	4	13	47	44	+3	43	
7	AZSV	30	11	9	10	38	39	−1	42	
8	DFS	30	10	11	9	47	43	+4	41	
9	Excelsior '31 (Note: Winner of the First Period (games 1-10).)	30	12	5	13	40	45	−5	41	Qualification for 2018–19 Derde Divisie play-offs
10	SDC Putten	30	11	8	11	40	50	−10	41	
11	Sparta Nijkerk	30	10	10	10	47	37	+10	40	
12	CSV Apeldoorn	30	10	6	14	51	61	−10	36	
13	HZVV (R)	30	8	8	14	37	54	−17	32	Qualification to relegation play-offs
14	Huizen (R)	30	6	8	16	47	65	−18	26	Qualification to relegation play-offs
15	Zuidvogels (R)	30	6	8	16	40	70	−30	26	Relegation to 2018–19 Eerste Klasse
16	NSC (R)	30	7	5	18	46	82	−36	26	Relegation to 2018–19 Eerste Klasse

Source: Soccerway
Rules for classification: 1) points; 2) goal difference; 3) number of goals scored
(C) Champions; (O) Play-off winners; (P) Promoted; (R) Relegated

==== Sunday A League ====
Pos	Team	Pld	W	D	L	GF	GA	GD	Pts	Promotion, qualification or relegation
1	SJC (Note: Winner of the First Period (games 1-10).) (C, P)	30	18	8	4	75	37	+38	62	Promotion to 2018–19 Derde Divisie Sunday
2	Achilles 1894 (Note: Winner of the Third Period (games 21-30).)	30	16	8	6	73	34	+39	56	Qualification for 2018–19 Derde Divisie play-offs
3	Silvolde (Note: Substitute winner of the First Period (games 1-10).)	30	15	10	5	69	35	+34	55	Qualification for 2018–19 Derde Divisie play-offs
4	Leonidas	30	15	6	9	65	53	+12	51	
5	Purmersteijn	30	14	6	10	57	47	+10	48	
6	Hollandia (Note: Winner of the Second Period (games 11-20).)	30	14	5	11	65	48	+17	47	Qualification for 2018–19 Derde Divisie play-offs
7	Alphense Boys	30	13	8	9	54	49	+5	47	
8	SDO	30	13	5	12	60	50	+10	44	
9	RKAVV	30	11	8	11	55	51	+4	41	
10	MSC	30	12	5	13	60	77	−17	41	
11	De Bataven	30	9	8	13	42	48	−6	35	
12	RKHVV	30	10	5	15	50	63	−13	35	
13	Sneek Wit Zwart (R)	30	9	6	15	37	49	−12	33	Qualification to relegation play-offs
14	DHC Delft (R)	30	8	6	16	47	73	−26	30	Qualification to relegation play-offs
15	VV Heerenveen (R)	30	6	6	18	34	72	−38	24	Relegation to 2018–19 Eerste Klasse
16	Jong Achilles '29 (R)	30	4	6	20	45	102	−57	18	Relegation to 2018–19 Eerste Klasse

Source: Soccerway
Rules for classification: 1) points; 2) goal difference; 3) number of goals scored
(C) Champions; (P) Promoted; (R) Relegated

==== Sunday B League ====
Pos	Team	Pld	W	D	L	GF	GA	GD	Pts	Promotion, qualification or relegation
1	OSS '20 (Note: Winner of the Second Period (games 11-20).) (C, P)	30	18	10	2	73	30	+43	64	Promotion to 2018–19 Derde Divisie Sunday
2	GOES (Note: Winner of the Third Period (games 21-30).) (O, P)	30	18	4	8	66	41	+25	58	Qualification for 2018–19 Derde Divisie play-offs
3	Halsteren (Note: Substitute winner of the Second Period (games 11-20).)	30	17	4	9	48	31	+17	55	Qualification for 2018–19 Derde Divisie play-offs
4	Jong Den Bosch	30	14	7	9	63	44	+19	49	
5	UDI '19	30	13	8	9	60	50	+10	47	
6	Gemert (Note: Winner of the First Period (games 1-10).)	30	14	3	13	63	49	+14	45	Qualification for 2018–19 Derde Divisie play-offs
7	Meerssen	30	14	3	13	56	46	+10	45	
8	IFC	30	11	9	10	45	53	−8	42	
9	Nuenen	30	12	5	13	49	62	−13	41	
10	Vlissingen	30	11	6	13	44	39	+5	39	
11	Groene Ster	30	11	6	13	45	51	−6	39	
12	Baronie	30	9	9	12	42	41	+1	36	
13	Juliana '31 (R)	30	10	3	17	39	61	−22	33	Qualification to relegation play-offs
14	BVC '12 (R)	30	8	6	16	43	63	−20	30	Qualification to relegation play-offs
15	EHC (R)	30	8	5	17	41	72	−31	29	Relegation to 2018–19 Eerste Klasse
16	Woezik (R)	30	7	2	21	37	81	−44	23	Relegation to 2018–19 Eerste Klasse

Source: Soccerway
Rules for classification: 1) points; 2) goal difference; 3) number of goals scored
(C) Champions; (O) Play-off winners; (P) Promoted; (R) Relegated

=== Eredivisie (women) ===
Pos	Team	Pld	W	D	L	GF	GA	GD	Pts	Qualification or relegation
1	Twente	16	12	3	1	46	11	+35	39	Qualification to Championship play-off
2	Ajax	16	10	5	1	32	14	+18	35	Qualification to Championship play-off
3	PEC Zwolle	16	7	3	6	34	26	+8	24	Qualification to Championship play-off
4	Heerenveen	16	7	3	6	28	26	+2	24	Qualification to Championship play-off
5	PSV	16	6	4	6	30	18	+12	22	Qualification to Championship play-off
6	ADO Den Haag	16	6	4	6	24	25	−1	22	Qualification to Placement play-off
7	Alkmaar	16	6	2	8	28	32	−4	20	Qualification to Placement play-off
8	Achilles '29	16	4	4	8	17	38	−21	16	Qualification to Placement play-off
9	Excelsior/Barendrecht	16	0	0	16	7	56	−49	0	Qualification to Placement play-off

Source: Soccerway
Rules for classification: Season in progress: 1) Points; 2) Less loss points; 3) Goal difference; 4) Goals scored; 5) Alphabetical order; End of season: 1) Points; 2) Goal difference; 3) Goals scored; 4) Head-to-head points; 5) Head-to-head goal difference; 6) Head-to-head away goals scored; 7) Play-off if relevant for deciding champion, relegation or participating in a European league, otherwise by draw. 8) Penalty shoot-out (only after a play-off)

=== Managerial changes ===
Team	Outgoing manager	Manner of departure	Date of vacancy	Position in table	Replaced by	Date of appointment
PEC Zwolle	(Netherlands) Ron Jans	End of contract	1 July 2017	Pre-season	(Netherlands) John van 't Schip	1 July 2017
Roda JC	(Netherlands) Rick Plum	End of interim spell	1 July 2017	Pre-season	(Netherlands) Robert Molenaar	1 July 2017
Ajax	(Netherlands) Peter Bosz	Signed by Borussia Dortmund	1 July 2017	Pre-season	(Netherlands) Marcel Keizer	1 July 2017
Twente	(Netherlands) René Hake	Sacked	18 October 2017	15th	(Netherlands) Gertjan Verbeek	30 October 2017
Sparta Rotterdam	(Netherlands) Alex Pastoor	Sacked	17 December 2017	17th	(Netherlands) Dick Advocaat	25 December 2017
Ajax	(Netherlands) Marcel Keizer	Sacked	21 December 2017	2nd	(Netherlands) Erik ten Hag	1 January 2018
FC Utrecht	(Netherlands) Erik ten Hag	Signed by Ajax	1 January 2018	6th	(Netherlands) Jean-Paul de Jong	4 January 2018

== National teams ==
=== Netherlands national football team ===
==== 2018 FIFA World Cup qualification ====
Pos	Team	Pld	W	D	L	GF	GA	GD	Pts	Qualification	France	Sweden	Netherlands	Bulgaria	Luxembourg	Belarus
1	France	10	7	2	1	18	6	+12	23	Qualification to 2018 FIFA World Cup	—	2–1	4–0	4–1	0–0	2–1
2	Sweden	10	6	1	3	26	9	+17	19	Advance to second round	2–1	—	1–1	3–0	8–0	4–0
3	Netherlands	10	6	1	3	21	12	+9	19		0–1	2–0	—	3–1	5–0	4–1
4	Bulgaria	10	4	1	5	14	19	−5	13		0–1	3–2	2–0	—	4–3	1–0
5	Luxembourg	10	1	3	6	8	26	−18	6		1–3	0–1	1–3	1–1	—	1–0
6	Belarus	10	1	2	7	6	21	−15	5		0–0	0–4	1–3	2–1	1–1	—

Source: FIFA

31 August 2017 2018 FIFA World Cup Q	France	4–0	Netherlands	Saint-Denis, France
20:45 (20:45 UTC+2)	Griezmann 14'; Lemar 73', 88'; Mbappé 90+1'	Report (FIFA); Report (UEFA)		Stadium: Stade de France; Attendance: 79,551; Referee: Gianluca Rocchi (Italy)

3 September 2017 2018 FIFA World Cup Q	Netherlands	3–1	Bulgaria	Amsterdam, Netherlands
18:00 (18:00 UTC+2)	Pröpper 7', 80'; Robben 67'	Report (FIFA); Report (UEFA)	Kostadinov 69'	Stadium: Amsterdam Arena; Attendance: 47,079; Referee: Tasos Sidiropoulos (Greece)

7 October 2017 2018 FIFA World Cup Q	Belarus	1–3	Netherlands	Barysaw, Belarus
20:45 (21:45 UTC+3)	Valadzko 55'	Report (FIFA); Report (UEFA)	Pröpper 24'; Robben 84' (pen.); Depay 90+3'	Stadium: Borisov Arena; Attendance: 6,850; Referee: Michael Oliver (England)

10 October 2017 2018 FIFA World Cup Q	Netherlands	2–0	Sweden	Amsterdam, Netherlands
20:45 (UTC+2)	Robben 16', 40'	Report (FIFA); Report (UEFA)		Stadium: Amsterdam Arena; Attendance: 41,244; Referee: Sergei Karasev (Russia)

9 November 2017 Friendly	Scotland	0–1	Netherlands	Aberdeen, Scotland
19:45 (20:45 UTC+2)		Report	Depay 40'	Stadium: Pittodrie Stadium; Attendance: 17,883; Referee: Ruddy Buquet (France)

14 November 2017 Friendly	Romania	0–3	Netherlands	Bucharest, Romania
19:00		Report	Depay 47'; Babel 57'; De Jong 81'	Stadium: Arena Națională; Referee: Christos Nikolaidis (Cyprus)
