= 2017–18 KNVB Cup =

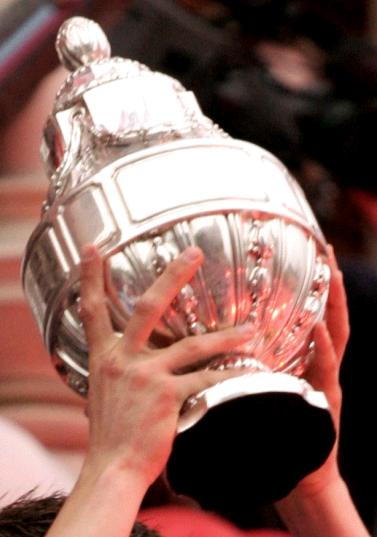
- KNVB Cup trophy

Tournament details
- Country: Netherlands
- Venue(s): De Kuip, Rotterdam
- Dates: 19 September 2017 – 22 April 2018
- Teams: 64 (103 including preliminaries)

Final positions
- Champions: Feyenoord (13th title)
- Runners-up: AZ

Tournament statistics
- Top goal scorer(s): Wout Weghorst (9 goals)

The 2017–18 KNVB Cup was the 100th edition of the Dutch national football annual knockout tournament for the KNVB Cup. 64 teams contested, beginning on 19 September 2017 with the first of six rounds and ending on 22 April 2018 at the final at De Kuip in Rotterdam.

The defending champions were Vitesse from the Eredivisie, who beat AZ 2–0 in the final in the previous season on 30 April 2017. They were unable to defend their title after losing to AVV Swift in the first round.

Feyenoord automatically qualified for the third preliminary round of the 2018–19 edition of the UEFA Europa League. The also contested in the 2018 edition of the Johan Cruyff Shield, the Dutch Supercup match at the start of the following season between the Cup winner and the champions of the 2017–18 Eredivisie, PSV.

== Calendar ==
Round	Date
First preliminary round	19 August 2017
Second preliminary round	23, 26–27 August 2017
First round	19–21 September 2017
Second round	24–26 October 2017
Round of 16	19–21 December 2017
Quarter-finals	30–31 January, 1 February 2018
Semi-finals	27–28 February, 1 March 2018
Final	22 April 2018

== First preliminary round ==
Matches scheduled on 19 August 2017.

Tie no	Home team	Score	Away team
1	RKVV EVV (3)	4–1	Olde Veste '54 (6)
2	BVV Den Bosch (7)	1–5	VV Staphorst (5)
3	RKSV Groene Ster (5)	1–2	SVV Scheveningen (3)
4	JVC Cuijk (3)	0–1 (a.e.t.)	SDC Putten (6)
5	VV Chevremont (6)	1–3	AVV Swift (5)
6	ADO '20 (5)	1–1 (a.e.t.) (10–11 p)	SV Spakenburg (3)
7	AFC Ajax (amateurs) (5)	3–1	OJC Rosmalen (4)
8	Sparta Nijkerk (5)	3–0	VPV Purmersteijn (5)
9	ACV Assen (4)	0–3	USV Hercules (4)
10	VV Dongen (4)	5–2	DOVO (4)
11	Vv Capelle (4)	6–0	RKSV Nuenen (5)
12	Ter Leede (5)	2–0	DHC Delft (5)
13	VV Buitenpost (4)	4–3	ZSV (4)
14	VVOG (4)	2–0	VV Gemert (5)

== Second preliminary round ==
Tie no	Home team	Score	Away team
1	DVS '33 (4)	1-2	Quick Boys (4)
2	ASWH (3)	1–3	HSV Hoek (5)
3	Achilles '29 (3)	3–2	OFC (4)
4	TEC VV (3)	1-3	Rijnsburgse Boys (3)
5	Koninklijke HFC (3)	4-0	RKVV Westlandia (4)
6	AFC Amsterdam (3)	0-2	ASV De Dijk (3)
7	SVV Scheveningen (4)	0-0 (a.e.t.) (3–2 p)	VV Spijkenisse (4)
8	HSC '21 (4)	0-1	VV Zwaluwen (5)
9	BVV Barendrecht (3)	1-0	VVOG (4)
10	Harkemase Boys (4)	0-0 (a.e.t.) (2–3 p)	Sparta Nijkerk (5)
11	Blauw Geel '38 (4)	3-2	SV Spakenburg (4)
12	SV DFS (5)	1-2	ONS Boso Sneek (4)
13	AVV Swift (5)	3-0	HBS Craeyenhout (4)
14	USV Hercules (4)	4-2 (a.e.t.)	VV Dongen (4)
15	VV Capelle (4)	6-1	VV Altius (8)
16	VVSB (3)	4-3 (a.e.t.)	RKVV EVV (4)
17	FC Lienden (3)	0-1	HHC Hardenberg (3)
18	VV UNA (4)	1-2	VV Staphorst (5)
19	Quick (H) (4)	2-3	Ter Leede (5)
20	Quick '20 (4)	0-1	CSV Apeldoorn (5)
21	VV Noordwijk (5)	3-2	IJsselmeervogels (3)
22	Excelsior Maassluis (3)	1-1 (a.e.t.) (6–7 p)	FC Lisse (3)
23	AFC Ajax Amateurs (5)	2-1 (a.e.t.)	Be Quick 1887 (4)
24	VV De Meern (4)	1-1 (a.e.t.) (4–3 p)	VC Vlissingen (5)
25	GVVV (3)	7-0	Magreb '90 (4)
26	ODIN '59 (4)	1-3	SDC Putten (5)
27	VV Buitenpost (6)	0-2	SC Genemuiden (5)

== First round ==
The draw of the first round was done on 26 August 2017. 64 teams participated and played on 19, 20 or 21 September 2017.

19 September 2017	VV Zwaluwen (5)	2–3	FC Den Bosch (2)	Vlaardingen
17:00	Merrelaar 86'; Gudde 90+2' (pen.)	Report	Biemans 52'; Blummel 64' (pen.), 81'	Stadium: Sportpark Zwaluwenlaan; Attendance: 750; Referee: Erwin Blank

19 September 2017	RKC Waalwijk (2)	1–0	Sparta Rotterdam (1)	Waalwijk
18:30	Seys 63'	Report		Stadium: Mandemakers Stadion; Attendance: 1,050; Referee: Bas Nijhuis

19 September 2017	GVVV (3)	1–0	FC Dordrecht (2)	Veenendaal
19:45	Laghmouchi 66'	Report		Stadium: Sportpark Panhuis; Attendance: 800; Referee: Laurens Gerrets

19 September 2017	FC Oss (2)	0–2	Almere City FC (2)	Oss
19:45		Report	Owusu 18'; Valpoort 65'	Stadium: Frans Heesen Stadion; Attendance: 1,800; Referee: Jochem Kamphuis

19 September 2017	VV Noordwijk (5)	0–1	Fortuna Sittard (2)	Noordwijk
19:45		Report	Dianessy 69'	Stadium: Sportpark Duinwetering; Attendance: 850; Referee: Clay Ruperti

19 September 2017	BVV Barendrecht (3)	1–3	Go Ahead Eagles (2)	Barendrecht
19:45	Esajas 14'	Report	Langedijk 30'; Hendriks 74', 86'	Stadium: Sportpark De Bongerd; Attendance: 1,000; Referee: Sander van der Eijk

19 September 2017	Helmond Sport (2)	1–5	SC Cambuur (2)	Helmond
19:45	Markiet 68'	Report	van Kippersluis 11', 52'; Rossi 78'; Kallon 81'; Robertha 89'	Stadium: Lavans Stadion; Attendance: 1,245; Referee: Christiaan Bax

19 September 2017	Rijnsburgse Boys (3)	0–2	Heracles Almelo (1)	Rijnsburg
19:45		Report	Pelupessy 73'; Vermeij 90+2'	Stadium: Sportpark Middelmors; Attendance: 1,100; Referee: Martin Perez

19 September 2017	FC Emmen (2)	1–3	N.E.C. (2)	Emmen
19:45	Bannink 30'	Report	Braken 34', 49'; Danjuma 53'	Stadium: JenS Vesting Stadion; Attendance: 2,452; Referee: Martin van den Kerkhof

19 September 2017	Kozakken Boys (3)	1–1 (a.e.t.) (4–3 p)	De Graafschap (2)	Werkendam
19:45	Sönmez 33'	Report	Ars 68'	Stadium: Sportpark De Zwaaier; Attendance: 1,500; Referee: Siemen Mulder
	Penalties
	Stout (penalty scored); Pollemans (penalty scored) van Ingen (penalty scored); Agatowski (penalty missed); Mendes Moreira (penalty scored)		S. Nieuwpoort (penalty missed); Klaasen (penalty scored) van Mieghem (penalty scored); Keurntjes (penalty missed); Serrarens (penalty scored)

19 September 2017	Sparta Nijkerk (5)	0–1	FC Eindhoven (2)	Nijkerk
19:45		Report	Lieder 75'	Stadium: Sportpark De Ebbenhorst; Attendance: 1,200; Referee: Freek Van Herk

19 September 2017	SC Genemuiden (5)	1–3	De Treffers (3)	Genemuiden
19:45	Kavak 32'	Report	Badjeck 40', 80' de Bondt 75'	Stadium: Sportpark De Wetering; Attendance: 1,200; Referee: Sam Dröge

19 September 2017	Quick Boys (4)	1–3	FC Volendam (2)	Katwijk
19:45	Teijsse 5'	Report	ten Den 45+2'; Runderkamp 53'; Mertens 89'	Stadium: Sportpark Nieuw Zuid; Attendance: 2,200; Referee: Edwin van de Graaf

19 September 2017	MVV Maastricht (2)	2–3	AZ (1)	Maastricht
20:45	Mmaee 34', 71'	Report	Hatzidiakos 7'; Weghorst 43', 82'	Stadium: De Geusselt; Attendance: 4,270; Referee: Danny Makkelie

20 September 2017	vv Capelle (4)	0–5	Roda JC Kerkrade (1)	Capelle aan den IJssel
17:00		Report	Schahin 6'; Rutjes 13'; Engels 40'; Djim 83', 84'	Stadium: Sportpark 't Slot; Attendance: 1,000; Referee: Joey Kooij

20 September 2017	AVV Swift (5)	0–0 (a.e.t.) (5–3 p)	SBV Vitesse (1)	Amsterdam
17:00		Report		Stadium: Sportpark Olympiaplein; Attendance: 1,500; Referee: Rob Dieperink
	Penalties
	Christianen (penalty scored); Dinkgreve (penalty scored); Moelee (penalty scored) de Groot (penalty scored); Ruijter (penalty scored)		Büttner (penalty missed); Matavž (penalty scored); Foor (penalty scored); Colkett (penalty scored)

20 September 2017	SVV Scheveningen (4)	1–5	Ajax (1)	Den Haag
18:30	Rog 62'	Report	Dolberg 5', 80', 85' (pen.); S. de Jong 42'; Koorndijk 57' (o.g.)	Stadium: Cars Jeans Stadion; Attendance: 3,500; Referee: Björn Kuipers

20 September 2017	ASV De Dijk (3)	2–1	HHC Hardenberg (3)	Amsterdam
19:45	El Gourari 51'; Zwarthoed 72'	Report	van Hezel 29'	Stadium: Sportpark Schellingwoude; Attendance: 400; Referee: Edgar Bijl

20 September 2017	VV Katwijk (3)	4 – 0	Ter Leede (5)	Katwijk
19:45	Mengerink 43'; Berkhout 50', 61' van den Ban 72'	Report		Stadium: Sportpark de Krom; Attendance: 900; Referee: Jannick van der Laan

20 September 2017	Achilles '29 (3)	4–3	NAC Breda (1)	Groesbeek
19:45	Oulad Omar 13' van de Beek 60' (pen.); Wouters 64'; Felomina 74'	Report	Vloet 7'; Mets 25'; Enevoldsen 90+4'	Stadium: Sportpark De Heikant; Attendance: 520; Referee: Jeroen Manschot

20 September 2017	VVSB (3)	4–1	Telstar (2)	Noordwijkerhout
19:45	El Osrouti 37', 53', 90+2' (pen.) de Rijk 79'	Report	Novakovich 7' (pen.)	Stadium: Sportpark De Boekhorst; Attendance: 1,250; Referee: Stan Teuben

20 September 2017	SBV Excelsior (1)	1–2	SC Heerenveen (1)	Rotterdam
19:45	van Duinen 74' (pen.)	Report	Zeneli 9', 15'	Stadium: Van Donge & De Roo Stadion; Attendance: 1,902; Referee: Dennis Higler

20 September 2017	VV Staphorst (5)	2–3	Koninklijke HFC (3)	Staphorst
19:45	Boer 54' (o.g.); Mijnheer 74'	Report	Sterling 50'; Castien 54'; Tamerus 64'	Stadium: Sportpark Het Noorderslag; Attendance: 1,200; Referee: Luca Evian Cantineau

20 September 2017	ONS Boso Sneek (4)	1–3	FC Twente (1)	Sneek
19:45	Gonzales 62'	Report	Vučkić 15'; Tighadouini 36'; Liendl 57'	Stadium: Zuidersportpark; Attendance: 2,100; Referee: Allard Lindhout

20 September 2017	AFC Ajax Amateurs (5)	0–6	FC Utrecht (1)	Amsterdam
19:45		Report	Dessers 8', 23'; Ayoub 25'; Görtler 30'; Willock 32'; Labyad 45'	Stadium: Amsterdam ArenA; Attendance: 300; Referee: Richard Martens

20 September 2017	CSV Apeldoorn (5)	2–4	Willem II (1)	Apeldoorn
19:45	Krijns 62' van Es 77'	Report	Rienstra 41'; Tsimikas 43', 49'; Sol 56'	Stadium: Sportpark Orderbos; Attendance: 2,350; Referee: Ingmar Oostrom

20 September 2017	FC Lisse (3)	2–2 (a.e.t.) (5–6 p)	HSV Hoek (5)	Lisse
19:45	van Eeuwijk 49', 107'	Report	Ceesay 90+3'; Impens 105+10'	Stadium: Sportpark Ter Specke; Attendance: 600; Referee: Marc Nagtegaal
	Penalties
	Monteny (penalty scored) van Boxel (penalty missed); Buijs (penalty scored) van Eeuwijk (penalty scored); Tavilla (penalty scored); Hagary (penalty scored); Rauws (penalty missed)		Leroy (penalty scored); Vitukynas (penalty scored) van Sprundel (penalty scored); Impens (penalty scored); Wilson (penalty missed); Verwilligen (penalty scored); Vandepitte (penalty scored)
Note: Lisse originally won the penalty shoot-out by a score of 5–4. However, after learning that the referee used the ABBA system, the KNVB ordered the shoot-out to be replayed on 11 October.

20 September 2017	Feyenoord (1)	2–0	ADO Den Haag (1)	Rotterdam
20:45	Berghuis 73'; Kramer 82' (pen.)	Report		Stadium: Stadion Feijenoord; Attendance: 45,000; Referee: Pol van Boekel

21 September 2017	VV De Meern (4)	0–5	PEC Zwolle (1)	Utrecht
17:00		Report	Nijland 11'; Namli 32'; Parzyszek 39' (pen.); Marinus 67'; Mokhtar 90+1' (pen.)	Stadium: Sportpark De Meern; Attendance: 700; Referee: Serdar Gözübüyük

21 September 2017	USV Hercules (4)	2–4	FC Groningen (1)	Utrecht
18:30	Belarbi 11'; Oehlers 86'	Report	Idrissi 40'; Dōan 46'; Bacuna 65'; Hrustic 76'	Stadium: Stadion Galgenwaard; Attendance: 3,000; Referee: Kevin Blom

21 September 2017	Blauw Geel '38 (4)	0–3	VVV-Venlo (1)	Veghel
19:45		Report	van Bruggen 29'; Amenyido 37'; Antonis 41'	Stadium: Prins Willem Alexander Sportpark; Attendance: 1,850; Referee: Siemen Mulder

21 September 2017	SDC Putten (5)	0–4	PSV Eindhoven (1)	Putten
20:45		Report	Maher 6', 70'; Luckassen 61'; Lammers 79'	Stadium: Sportpark De Putter Eng; Attendance: 2,000; Referee: Ed Janssen

== Second round ==
The draw of the second round was done on 21 September 2017. 32 teams participated and played on 24, 25 or 26 October 2017.

The lowest ranked teams left were Swift and Hoek from the fifth tier of Dutch football.

24 October 2017	N.E.C. (2)	3–0	Achilles '29 (3)	Nijmegen
18:30	Danjuma 40'; Kadioglu 58'; Rayhi 88'	Report		Stadium: Goffertstadion; Attendance: 5,115; Referee: Dennis Higler

24 October 2017	Fortuna Sittard (2)	3–0	Go Ahead Eagles (2)	Sittard
19:45	Hutten 17'; Malsa 61'; Dammers 77'	Report		Stadium: Fortuna Sittard Stadion; Attendance: 1,824; Referee: Jeroen Manschot

24 October 2017	PEC Zwolle (1)	3–2 (a.e.t.)	Kozakken Boys (3)	Zwolle
19:45	Namli 8'; Sandler 77'; Bakker 105+2' (pen.)	Report	El Azzouti 52'; Stout 88'	Stadium: MAC³PARK Stadion; Attendance: 12,128; Referee: Joey Kooij

24 October 2017	VV Katwijk (3)	1–2	VVSB (3)	Katwijk
19:45	Susan 65'	Report	El Osrouti 56'; Zwart 59'	Stadium: Sportpark de Krom; Attendance: 3,000; Referee: Rob Dieperink

24 October 2017	GVVV (3)	1–0	Koninklijke HFC (3)	Veenendaal
19:45	Brouwer 47'	Report		Stadium: Sportpark Panhuis; Attendance: 1,500; Referee: Christian Mulder

24 October 2017	RKC Waalwijk (2)	7–0	De Treffers (3)	Waalwijk
19:45	Bakari 21', 90+1'; Bergkamp 38'; Voskamp 43' de Graauw 82', 86', 89'	Report		Stadium: Mandemakers Stadion; Attendance: 1,215; Referee: Edgar Bijl

24 October 2017	FC Den Bosch (2)	0–2	SC Cambuur (2)	's-Hertogenbosch
19:45		Report	Peersman 77' van Kippersluis 84'	Stadium: Stadion De Vliert; Attendance: 1,900; Referee: Siemen Mulder

24 October 2017	FC Twente (1)	3–0	FC Eindhoven (2)	Enschede
19:45	Boere 28', 49'; Tighadouini 56' (pen.)	Report		Stadium: De Grolsch Veste; Attendance: 17,100; Referee: Edwin van de Graaf

25 October 2017	Heracles Almelo (1)	3–1	HSV Hoek (5)	Almelo
18:30	Peterson 36', 77'; Jamiro 45'	Report	van Sprundel 59'	Stadium: Polman Stadion; Attendance: 9,120; Referee: Christian Bax

25 October 2017	VVV-Venlo (1)	3–1	FC Utrecht (1)	Venlo
18:30	Thy 2'; Hunte 20'; Rutten 82'	Report	Kerk 61'	Stadium: Seacon Stadion de Koel; Attendance: 3,928; Referee: Kevin Blom

25 October 2017	ASV De Dijk (3)	1–4	Ajax (1)	Volendam
18:30	El Gourari 52'	Report	F. de Jong 16'; S. de Jong 26', 31'; Černý 46'	Stadium: Kras Stadion; Attendance: 6,618; Referee: Jochem Kamphuis

25 October 2017	Willem II (1)	2–1	SC Heerenveen (1)	Tilburg
19:45	Rienstra 49'; Fran Sol 61'	Report	Ghoochannejhad 54'	Stadium: Koning Willem II Stadion; Attendance: 7,739; Referee: Martin van den Kerkhof

25 October 2017	Roda JC Kerkrade (1)	3–1	FC Groningen (1)	Kerkrade
19:45	Ndenge 44', 69'; Rosheuvel 90+2'	Report	Bacuna 56'	Stadium: Parkstad Limburg Stadion; Attendance: 7,273; Referee: Ed Janssen

25 October 2017	Feyenoord (1)	4–1	AVV Swift (5)	Rotterdam
20:45	Larsson 8', 45', 87'; Kramer 66'	Report	van Wakeren 50'	Stadium: Stadion Feijenoord; Attendance: 23,500; Referee: Serdar Gözübüyük

26 October 2017	FC Volendam (2)	0–2 (a.e.t.)	PSV Eindhoven (1)	Volendam
18:30		Report	van Ginkel 107'; Lozano 119'	Stadium: Kras Stadion; Attendance: 6,404; Referee: Bas Nijhuis

26 October 2017	Almere City FC (2)	0–4	AZ (1)	Almere
20:45		Report	Wuytens 35'; Weghorst 48', 59'; Svensson 75'	Stadium: Yanmar Stadion; Attendance: 2,729; Referee: Danny Makkelie

== Round of 16 ==
The draw of the round of 16 was done on 26 October 2017. 16 teams are participating and will play on 19, 20 or 21 December 2017.

The lowest ranked teams left are GVVV and VVSB from the third tier of Dutch football.

19 December 2017	PEC Zwolle (1)	2–0	N.E.C. (2)	Zwolle
18:30	Mokhtar 20'; Ondaan 48'	Report		Stadium: MAC^{3}PARK stadion Attendance: 10,124; Referee: Björn Kuipers

19 December 2017	SC Cambuur (2)	3–0	GVVV (3)	Leeuwarden
19:45	Robertha 59'; Steenvoorden 71'; Kip 83' (pen.)	Report		Stadium: Cambuurstadion; Attendance: 4,506; Referee: Siemen Mulder

19 December 2017	Willem II (1)	3–0	RKC Waalwijk (2)	Tilburg
20:45	Sol 14', 37'; Azzaoui 40'	Report		Stadium: Koning Willem II Stadion; Attendance: 10,710; Referee: Kevin Blom

20 December 2017	PSV Eindhoven (1)	4–1	VVV-Venlo (1)	Eindhoven
18:30	De Jong 45+2'; Van Ginkel 66'; Lozano 79'; Isimat-Mirin 90+3'	Report	Rutten 41'	Stadium: Philips Stadion; Attendance: 31,800; Referee: Jochem Kamphuis

20 December 2017	Fortuna Sittard (2)	2–4	AZ (1)	Sittard
19:45	Dianessy 27'; Stokkers 48'	Report	Weghorst 2', 89'; Jahanbakhsh 90+2'; García 90+5'	Stadium: Fortuna Sittard Stadion; Attendance: 5,089; Referee: Allard Lindhout

20 December 2017	FC Twente (1)	1–1 (a.e.t.) (6–5 p)	Ajax (1)	Enschede
20:45	Assaidi 90+1'	Report	Kluivert 18'	Stadium: De Grolsch Veste; Attendance: 26,700; Referee: Pol van Boekel
	Penalties
	Assaidi (penalty scored); Holla (penalty scored); Tighadouini (penalty missed); Cuevas (penalty scored); Liendl (penalty scored); Laukart (penalty scored); Bijen (penalty scored)		(penalty scored) Schöne; (penalty scored) de Jong; (penalty scored) van de Beek; (penalty missed) Ziyech; (penalty scored) Huntelaar; (penalty scored) Veltman; (penalty missed) de Ligt

21 December 2017	VVSB (3)	0–1	Roda JC Kerkrade (1)	Noordwijkerhout
18:30		Report	Schahin 48'	Stadium: Sportpark de Boekhorst; Attendance: 2,500; Referee: Ed Janssen

21 December 2017	Feyenoord (1)	3–1	Heracles Almelo (1)	Rotterdam
20:45	Berghuis 7', 86' (pen.); Van Beek 16'	Report	Breukers 23'	Stadium: De Kuip; Attendance: 30,000; Referee: Bas Nijhuis

== Quarter-finals ==
The quarter-final draw was held on 21 December 2017. 8 teams participated and the matches will be played on 30 and 31 January 2018 and 1 February 2018.

The lowest ranked team left is Cambuur from the second tier of Dutch football.

30 January 2018	FC Twente (1)	3–1	SC Cambuur (2)	Enschede
20:45	Assaidi 60' (pen.); Maher 68', 76'	Report	Schils 33'	Stadium: De Grolsch Veste; Attendance: 22,600; Referee: Ed Janssen

31 January 2018	AZ (1)	4–1	PEC Zwolle (1)	Alkmaar
18:30	Weghorst 21', 71'; Til 39'; Idrissi 60'	Report	Marinus 32'	Stadium: AFAS Stadion; Referee: Bas Nijhuis

31 January 2018	Feyenoord (1)	2–0	PSV Eindhoven (1)	Rotterdam
20:45	Larsson 3'; Vilhena 35'	Report		Stadium: De Kuip; Referee: Pol van Boekel

1 February 2018	Willem II (1)	2–2 (a.e.t.) (5–4 p)	Roda JC Kerkrade (1)	Tilburg
20:45		Report		Stadium: Koning Willem II Stadion; Attendance: 10,300; Referee: Dennis Higler

== Semi-finals ==
The matches for the semi-finals took place on 28 February 2018.

28 February 2018	AZ (1)	4–0	FC Twente (1)	Alkmaar
18:30	Til 24'; Weghorst 64'; Idrissi 68', 73'	Report		Stadium: AFAS Stadion

28 February 2018	Feyenoord (1)	3–0	Willem II (1)	Rotterdam
20:45	Berghuis 20'; Van Persie 60'; Vilhena 84'	Report		Stadium: De Kuip

== Final ==
22 April 2018
18:00 CEST

AZ	0–3	Feyenoord
	Report	Jørgensen 28'; Van Persie 57'; Toornstra 90+4'

De Kuip, Rotterdam
Attendance: 46,084
Referee: Björn Kuipers
