= 2018–19 Hoofdklasse =

Hoofdklasse
- Season: 2018–19
- Champions: Sat A: Ter Leede; Sat B: Excelsior '31; Sun A: DEM; Sun B: Groene Ster
- Promoted: Sat A: Ter Leede; Sat B: Excelsior '31; Sparta Nijkerk; Sun A: DEM; Hoogland; Sun B: Groene Ster; Gemert
- Relegated: Sat A: Nootdorp; DFS; XerxesDZB; Sat B: CSV Apeldoorn; WHC; SVZW; Sun A: De Bataven; Fortuna Wormerveer; Achilles 1894; RKHVV; Sun B: Vlissingen; De Meern; Papendorp

The 2018–19 season of the Hoofdklasse was played in four leagues, two Saturday leagues and two Sunday leagues. The champions of each group promoted directly to the 2019–20 Derde Divisie. The 2018–19 Hoofdklasse started on Saturday 1 September 2018.

== Play-offs ==
=== Promotion ===
In each competition teams play periods of 10 games, three times per season (30 games per season). After each period the best team which has not yet qualified earns a spot in the play-offs for the Derde Divisie as the period champion. If a period winner ends the season as champions, they will be replaced by the highest ranked team not yet qualified for the play-offs. In total 12 (substitute) period winners and 4 teams from the Derde Divisie compete for 3 spots in next seasons Derde Divisie.

Due to the removal of Papendorp from the league, there have been only 2 periods of 14 games each in the Hoofdklasse B Sunday. The highest ranked team not yet qualified for the play-offs was assigned as third period winner.

=== Relegation ===
The teams in place 13 and 14 at the end of the season fight against relegation in the relegation play-offs. They face the period champions of the Eerste Klasse.

== Saturday A ==
=== Teams ===
Location of teams in the Saturday Hoofdklasse A 2018/19
South Holland clubs in the Saturday Hoofdklasse A 2018/19

Club	Home City	Venue	Capacity
Achilles Veen	Veen	Sportpark De Hanen Weide	
Capelle	Capelle aan den IJssel	Sportpark 't Slot	3,000
DFS	Opheusden	Sportpark 't Heerenland	
SC Feyenoord	Rotterdam	Varkenoord	
's-Gravenzande	's-Gravenzande	Juliana Sportpark	
Jodan Boys	Gouda	Sportpark Oosterwei	
Jong Den Bosch	's-Hertogenbosch	Stadion De Vliert	8,500
Nootdorp	Nootdorp	Sportpark 's-Gravenhout	
Rijnvogels	Katwijk aan den Rijn	Sportpark De Kooltuin	
Smitshoek	Barendrecht	Sportpark Smitshoek	
Spijkenisse	Spijkenisse	Sportpark Jaap Riedijk	3,500
Swift	Amsterdam	Sportpark Olympiaplein	
Ter Leede	Sassenheim	Gemeentelijk Sportpark De Roodemolen	
RKAV Volendam	Volendam	Gem. Sportpark	
XerxesDZB	Rotterdam	Sportpark Faas Wilkes	3,500
Zwaluwen	Vlaardingen	Sportpark Zwaluwen	

=== Standings ===
Pos	Team	Pld	W	D	L	GF	GA	GD	Pts	Promotion, qualification or relegation
1	Ter Leede (Note: Winner of the third period (games 21-30).) (C, P)	30	21	4	5	62	31	+31	67	Promotion to 2019–20 Derde Divisie Saturday
2	RKAV Volendam (Note: Winner of the first period (games 1-10).)	30	19	4	7	84	46	+38	61	Qualification for 2019–20 Derde Divisie play-offs
3	SC Feyenoord (Note: Substitute winner of the third period (games 21-30).)	30	14	12	4	67	52	+15	54	Qualification for 2019–20 Derde Divisie play-offs
4	Zwaluwen	30	14	8	8	50	39	+11	50	
5	Jong Den Bosch	30	14	5	11	65	47	+18	47	
6	Rijnvogels	30	14	4	12	53	44	+9	46	
7	Jodan Boys (Note: Winner of the second period (games 11-20).)	30	13	7	10	52	46	+6	46	Qualification for 2019–20 Derde Divisie play-offs
8	's-Gravenzande	30	13	5	12	57	54	+3	44	
9	Smitshoek	30	11	8	11	46	48	−2	41	
10	Swift	30	10	9	11	58	52	+6	39	
11	Achilles Veen	30	11	6	13	50	45	+5	39	
12	Capelle	30	11	6	13	44	52	−8	39	
13	Spijkenisse (O)	30	10	7	13	50	58	−8	37	Qualification to relegation play-offs
14	Nootdorp (R)	30	6	5	19	32	65	−33	23	Qualification to relegation play-offs
15	DFS (R)	30	6	6	18	38	70	−32	21	Relegation to 2019–20 Eerste Klasse
16	XerxesDZB (R)	30	3	4	23	33	92	−59	13	Relegation to 2019–20 Eerste Klasse

Source: Soccerway
Rules for classification: 1) points; 2) goal difference; 3) number of goals scored
(C) Champions; (O) Play-off winners; (P) Promoted; (R) Relegated

== Saturday B ==
=== Teams ===
Location of teams in the Saturday Hoofdklasse B 2018/19
Gelderland clubs in the Saturday Hoofdklasse B 2018/19

Club	Location	Venue	Capacity
ACV	Assen	Univé-Sportpark	5,000
AZSV	Aalten	Sportpark Villekamp	
Berkum	Zwolle	Sportpark De Vegtlust	
Buitenpost	Buitenpost	Sportpark De Swadde	1,500
CSV Apeldoorn	Apeldoorn	Sportpark Orderbos	2,500
DETO Twenterand	Vriezenveen	't Midden	4,000
DUNO	Doorwerth	Sportpark De Waayenberg	1,000
Excelsior '31	Rijssen	Sportpark De Koerbelt	
Flevo Boys	Emmeloord	Sportpark Ervenbos	3,000
Genemuiden	Genemuiden	Sportpark De Wetering	
SDC Putten	Putten	Sportpark Putter Eng	
Sparta Nijkerk	Nijkerk	Sportpark De Ebbenhorst	
Staphorst	Staphorst	Sportpark Het Noorderslag	
SVZW	Wierden	Het Lageveld	
Urk	Urk	Sportpark De Vormt	
WHC	Wezep	Mulderssingel	

=== Standings ===
Pos	Team	Pld	W	D	L	GF	GA	GD	Pts	Promotion, qualification or relegation
1	Excelsior '31 (C, P)	30	19	7	4	63	26	+37	64	Promotion to 2019–20 Derde Divisie Saturday
2	Staphorst (Note: Winner of the second period (games 11-20).)	30	18	9	3	65	33	+32	63	Qualification for 2019–20 Derde Divisie play-offs
3	Sparta Nijkerk (Note: Winner of the third period (games 21-30).) (O, P)	30	19	6	5	51	29	+22	63	Qualification for 2019–20 Derde Divisie play-offs
4	AZSV	30	17	7	6	47	30	+17	58	
5	ACV (Note: Winner of the first period (games 1-10).)	30	15	9	6	49	33	+16	54	Qualification for 2019–20 Derde Divisie play-offs
6	Urk	30	15	8	7	47	33	+14	53	
7	Berkum	30	12	5	13	46	49	−3	41	
8	DUNO	30	12	4	14	52	52	0	40	
9	SDC Putten	30	10	9	11	47	40	+7	39	
10	Flevo Boys	30	10	6	14	37	43	−6	36	
11	Genemuiden	30	9	6	15	42	49	−7	33	
12	Buitenpost	30	7	8	15	31	57	−26	29	
13	DETO Twenterand (O)	30	8	3	19	35	54	−19	27	Qualification to relegation play-offs
14	CSV Apeldoorn (R)	30	7	5	18	42	66	−24	26	Qualification to relegation play-offs
15	WHC (R)	30	7	4	19	44	68	−24	25	Relegation to 2019–20 Eerste Klasse
16	SVZW (R)	30	4	6	20	39	75	−36	18	Relegation to 2019–20 Eerste Klasse

Source: Soccerway
Rules for classification: 1) points; 2) goal difference; 3) number of goals scored
(C) Champions; (O) Play-off winners; (P) Promoted; (R) Relegated

== Sunday A ==
=== Teams ===
Location of teams in the Sunday Hoofdklasse A 2018/19

Club	Location	Venue	Capacity
Achilles 1894	Assen	Sportpark Marsdijk	
Alcides	Meppel	Ezinge	
AWC	Wijchen	Sportpark De Wijchert	2,000
De Bataven	Gendt	Sportpark Walburgen	
Be Quick 1887	Haren	Stadion Esserberg	12,000
DEM	Beverwijk	Sportpark Adrichem	1,800
Fortuna Wormerveer	Wormerveer	Sportpark Fortuna Wormerveer	2,000
Hollandia	Hoorn	Juliana Sportpark	
Hoogeveen	Hoogeveen	Bentinckspark	
Hoogland	Hoogland	Sportpark de Langenoord	
MSC	Meppel	Sportpark Ezinge	
Purmersteijn	Purmerend	Sportpark Purmersteijn	
RKHVV	Huissen	Sportpark SP de Blauwenburcht	
RKZVC	Zieuwent	Sportpark De Greune Weide	1,500
SDO	Bussum	Sportpark De Kuil	
Silvolde	Silvolde	Sportpark de Munsterman	

=== Standings ===
Pos	Team	Pld	W	D	L	GF	GA	GD	Pts	Promotion, qualification or relegation
1	DEM (Note: Winner of the third period (games 21-30).) (C, P)	30	17	9	4	60	31	+29	60	Promotion to 2019–20 Derde Divisie Sunday
2	Hoogeveen (Note: Winner of the first period (games 1-10).)	30	17	6	7	71	45	+26	57	Qualification for 2019–20 Derde Divisie play-offs
3	SDO (Note: Substitute winner of the third period (games 21-30).)	30	18	3	9	69	48	+21	57	Qualification for 2019–20 Derde Divisie play-offs
4	RKZVC	30	16	5	9	59	53	+6	53	
5	Hoogland (Note: Winner of the second period (games 11-20).) (O, P)	30	14	7	9	53	43	+10	49	Qualification for 2019–20 Derde Divisie play-offs
6	MVV Alcides	30	13	5	12	51	51	0	44	
7	Silvolde	30	12	6	12	54	46	+8	42	
8	Hollandia	30	12	6	12	43	49	−6	42	
9	Purmersteijn	30	10	11	9	48	37	+11	41	
10	MSC	30	12	3	15	53	58	−5	39	
11	AWC	30	12	3	15	52	69	−17	39	
12	Be Quick 1887	30	10	7	13	52	51	+1	37	
13	De Bataven (R)	30	10	7	13	51	60	−9	37	Qualification to relegation play-offs
14	Fortuna Wormerveer (R)	30	8	7	15	39	52	−13	31	Qualification to relegation play-offs
15	Achilles 1894 (R)	30	8	6	16	47	59	−12	30	Relegation to 2019–20 Eerste Klasse
16	RKHVV (R)	30	3	5	22	30	80	−50	14	Relegation to 2019–20 Eerste Klasse

Source: Soccerway
Rules for classification: 1) points; 2) goal difference; 3) number of goals scored
(C) Champions; (O) Play-off winners; (P) Promoted; (R) Relegated

== Sunday B ==
=== Teams ===
Location of teams in the Sunday Hoofdklasse B 2018/19

Club	Location	Venue	Capacity
Alphense Boys	Alphen aan den Rijn	Sportpark De Bijlen	
Baronie	Breda	Sportpark Blauwe Kei	
Gemert	Gemert	Sportpark Molenbroek	4,000
Groene Ster	Heerlerheide	Sportpark Pronsebroek	
Halsteren	Halsteren	Sportpark De Beek	
IFC	Hendrik Ido Ambacht	Sportpark Schildman	
Leonidas	Rotterdam	Sportpark Leonidas	
De Meern	Utrecht	Sportpark De Meern	2,000
Meerssen	Meerssen	Sportpark Marsana	
Minor	Nuth	Sportpark De Kollenberg	1,500
Nuenen	Nuenen	Sportpark Oude Landen	
Papendorp	Utrecht	Sportpark Papendorp	1,000
RKAVV	Leidschendam	Sportpark Kastelering	
UDI '19	Uden	Gemeentelijk Sportpark	
Unitas	Gorinchem	Sportpark Molenvliet	3,000
Vlissingen	Vlissingen	Sportpark Irislaan	

=== Standings ===
Pos	Team	Pld	W	D	L	GF	GA	GD	Pts	Promotion, qualification or relegation
1	Groene Ster (Note: Winner of the second period (games 15-28).) (C, P)	28	20	4	4	61	27	+34	64	Promotion to 2019–20 Derde Divisie Sunday
2	Gemert (Note: Substitute winner of the second period (games 15-28).) (O, P)	28	19	2	7	80	36	+44	59	Qualification for 2019–20 Derde Divisie play-offs
3	Halsteren (Note: Substitute winner of the fictional third period.)	28	16	9	3	57	22	+35	57	Qualification for 2019–20 Derde Divisie play-offs
4	Baronie	28	17	5	6	52	30	+22	56	
5	Unitas (Note: Winner of the first period (games 1-14).)	28	17	2	9	59	42	+17	53	Qualification for 2019–20 Derde Divisie play-offs
6	Meerssen	28	10	8	10	39	44	−5	38	
7	Nuenen	28	10	7	11	42	39	+3	37	
8	Alphense Boys	28	10	6	12	51	47	+4	36	
9	UDI '19	28	9	7	12	36	42	−6	34	
10	Minor	28	8	7	13	39	54	−15	31	
11	RKAVV	28	8	5	15	33	42	−9	29	
12	IFC	28	8	4	16	46	66	−20	28	
13	Leonidas (O)	28	7	7	14	38	65	−27	28	Qualification to relegation play-offs
14	Vlissingen (R)	28	7	5	16	30	52	−22	26	Qualification to relegation play-offs
15	De Meern (R)	28	3	4	21	25	80	−55	13	Relegation to 2019–20 Eerste Klasse
16	Papendorp (Note: Papendorp were removed from the league after two consecutive no shows.) (R)	8	0	1	7	2	53	−51	1	Removed from league, relegated to 2019–20 Eerste Klasse

Updated to match(es) played on 26 May 2019. Source: Soccerway
Rules for classification: 1) points; 2) goal difference; 3) number of goals scored
(C) Champions; (O) Play-off winners; (P) Promoted; (R) Relegated

== Promotion/relegation play-offs Hoofdklasse and Eerste Klasse ==
=== Saturday ===
The numbers 13 and 14 from each of the 2018–19 Hoofdklasse Saturday leagues (2 times 2 teams) and 3 (substitute) period winners of each of the 2018–19 Eerste Klasse Saturday leagues (5 times 3 teams), making 19 teams, decide in a 3-round single match knockout system, which 3 teams play next season in the 2019–20 Hoofdklasse Saturday leagues. The remaining 16 teams play next season in the 2019–20 Eerste Klasse Saturday leagues.

First round

The 2 highest ranked Hoofdklasse teams (numbers 13) are released from playing the first round. Out of the 2 lowest ranked Hoofdklasse teams (numbers 14) and the 5 highest ranked (substitute) period winners (HPWs), 3 more teams are by draw released from playing the first round. The remaining 14 teams are paired by draw in such a way that, a HK or HPW team will always play a lowest ranked (substitute) period winner (LPW), and the highest ranked team gets the home advantage. The ranking order is HPW, HK, middle ranked (substitute) period winner (MPW) and LPW teams. If 2 equally ranked teams face each other, the order in which the 2 teams are drawn decides on the home advantage.

Second round

The 7 winners of the first round and the 5 teams released from playing the first round, making 12 teams, are paired by draw. The highest ranked team gets the home advantage. The ranking order is identical as in the first round.

Finals

The 6 winners of the second round are paired by draw. Matches are played on neutral ground and the 3 winners play next season in the 2019–20 Hoofdklasse Saturday leagues.

==== Qualified Teams ====
Club	Qualification	Remark
Spijkenisse	13th in the Hoofdklasse A Saturday	Released from playing the first round
Nootdorp	14th in the Hoofdklasse A Saturday	Released by draw from playing the first round
DETO Twenterand	13th in the Hoofdklasse B Saturday	Released from playing the first round
CSV Apeldoorn	14th in the Hoofdklasse B Saturday	
ARC	Winner of the third period in the Eerste Klasse A Saturday (2nd)	
AFC	Substitute winner of the second period in the Eerste Klasse A Saturday (3rd)	
Roda '46	Winner of the first period in the Eerste Klasse A Saturday (8th)	
Kloetinge	Winner of the second period in the Eerste Klasse B Saturday (2nd)	Released by draw from playing the first round
SHO	Winner of the first period in the Eerste Klasse B Saturday (3rd)	
Honselersdijk	Substitute winner of the third period in the Eerste Klasse B Saturday (4th)	
Sliedrecht	Winner of the first period in the Eerste Klasse C Saturday (2nd)	
Heerjansdam	Substitute winner of the second period in the Eerste Klasse C Saturday (3rd)	
GRC '14	Winner of the third period in the Eerste Klasse C Saturday (11th)	
Bennekom	Winner of the third period in the Eerste Klasse D Saturday (2nd)	Released by draw from playing the first round
Go-Ahead Kampen	Substitute winner of the first period in the Eerste Klasse D Saturday (3rd)	
DTS Ede	Winner of the second period in the Eerste Klasse D Saturday (5th)	
Oranje Nassau Groningen	Winner of the second period in the Eerste Klasse E Saturday (2nd)	
Winsum	Substitute winner of the first period in the Eerste Klasse E Saturday (3rd)	
Noordscheschut	Winner of the third period in the Eerste Klasse E Saturday (4th)	

==== Results ====
First round
1 juni 2019
Sliedrecht	4
Honselersdijk	1
1 juni 2019
CSV Apeldoorn	0
Roda '46	1

Second round
8 juni 2019
Kloetinge	1
DETO Twenterand (a.e.t.)	3
11 juni 2019
Sliedrecht	5
Roda '46	2

Final
15 juni 2019
DETO Twenterand (a.e.t.)	3
Sliedrecht	1

First round
1 juni 2019
Oranje Nassau Groningen	1
DTS Ede	5
1 juni 2019
ARC	2
GRC '14	1
1 juni 2019
SHO	2
Heerjansdam	1

Second round
8 juni 2019
Nootdorp	0
DTS Ede	4
8 juni 2019
ARC	4
SHO	1

Final
15 juni 2019
DTS Ede	3 (3)
ARC	3 (5)

First round
1 juni 2019
Winsum	1 (3)
Noordscheschut (pen.)	1 (4)
1 juni 2019
Go-Ahead Kampen	6
AFC	2

Second round
8 juni 2019
Spijkenisse	3
Noordscheschut	0
8 juni 2019
Bennekom	0
Go-Ahead Kampen	3

Final
15 juni 2019
Spijkenisse (pen.)	1 (4)
Go-Ahead Kampen	1 (1)

ARC promoted to the 2019-20 Hoofdklasse Saturday.
Spijkenisse and DETO Twenterand maintained in the 2019-20 Hoofdklasse Saturday.
CSV Apeldoorn and Nootdorp relegated to the 2019-20 Eerste Klasse Saturday.
The other teams remained in the 2019-20 Eerste Klasse Saturday.

=== Sunday ===
The numbers 13 and 14 from each of the 2018–19 Hoofdklasse Sunday leagues (2 times 2 teams) and 3 (substitute) period winners of each of the 2018–19 Eerste Klasse Sunday leagues (6 times 3 teams), making 22 teams, decide in a 4-round single match knockout system, which 2 teams play next season in the 2019–20 Hoofdklasse Sunday leagues. The remaining 20 teams play next season in the 2019–20 Eerste Klasse Sunday leagues.

First round

The Hoofdklasse teams and 6 highest ranked (substitute) period winners (HPWs) are released from playing the first round. The 12 remaining (substitute) period winners are paired by draw in such a way that, a middle (substitute) period winner (MPW) will always play a lowest ranked (substitute) period winner (LPW). The MPW teams also get the home advantage.

Second round

The 6 winners of the first round and the 10 teams released from playing the first round, making 16 teams, are paired by draw in such a way that, two HPW teams can never face each other. The highest ranked team gets the home advantage. The ranking order is HPW, highest ranked Hoofdklasse (HHK) teams (numbers 13), lowest ranked Hoofdklasse (LHK) teams (numbers 14), MPW and LPW teams. If 2 equally ranked teams face each other, the order in which the 2 teams are drawn decides on the home advantage.

Third round

The 8 winners of the first round are paired by draw. The highest ranked team gets the home advantage. The ranking order is identical as in the second round.

Finals

The 4 winners of the third round are paired by draw. Matches are played on neutral ground and the 2 winners play next season in the 2019–20 Hoofdklasse Sunday leagues.

==== Qualified Teams ====
Club	Qualification	Remark
De Bataven	13th in the Hoofdklasse A Sunday	Released from playing the first round
Fortuna Wormerveer	14th in the Hoofdklasse A Sunday	Released from playing the first round
Leonidas	13th in the Hoofdklasse B Sunday	Released from playing the first round
Vlissingen	14th in the Hoofdklasse B Sunday	Released from playing the first round
JOS Watergraafsmeer	Winner of the first period in the Eerste Klasse A Sunday (2nd)	Released from playing the first round
Boshuizen	Substitute winner of the third period in the Eerste Klasse A Sunday (3rd)	
Uitgeest	Winner of the second period in the Eerste Klasse A Sunday (4th)	
Moerse Boys	Winner of the first period in the Eerste Klasse B Sunday (2nd)	Released from playing the first round
VUC	Substitute winner of the second period in the Eerste Klasse B Sunday (3rd)	
DHC Delft	Substitute winner of the fictional third period in the Eerste Klasse B Sunday (4th)	
SV TOP	Winner of the second period in the Eerste Klasse C Sunday (2nd)	Released from playing the first round
Nemelaer	Winner of the third period in the Eerste Klasse C Sunday (3rd)	
Leones	Substitute winner of the first period in the Eerste Klasse C Sunday (4th)	
ZSV	Winner of the second period in the Eerste Klasse D Sunday (2nd)	Released from playing the first round
Chevremont	Substitute winner of the first period in the Eerste Klasse D Sunday (3rd)	
Deurne	Winner of the third period in the Eerste Klasse D Sunday (4th)	
Bemmel	Substitute winner of the third period in the Eerste Klasse E Sunday (2nd)	Released from playing the first round
Rohda Raalte	Winner of the first period in the Eerste Klasse E Sunday (3rd)	
BVC '12	Winner of the second period in the Eerste Klasse E Sunday (4th)	
Sneek Wit Zwart	Winner of the first period in the Eerste Klasse F Sunday (2nd)	Released from playing the first round
VKW	Substitute winner of the second period in the Eerste Klasse F Sunday (3rd)	
GOMOS	Winner of the third period in the Eerste Klasse F Sunday (4th)	

==== Results ====
First round
30 mei 2019
Chevremont	3
Deurne	2
30 mei 2019
VKW	3
GOMOS	0
30 mei 2019
Boshuizen (a.e.t.)	2
Uitgeest	1

Second round
2 juni 2019
Fortuna Wormerveer (a.e.t.)	3
Chevremont	1
2 juni 2019
De Bataven	1
VKW	2
2 juni 2019
Moerse Boys	4
Vlissingen	2
2 juni 2019
Bemmel	3
Boshuizen	2

Third round
10 juni 2019
Fortuna Wormerveer	1 (6)
VKW (pen.)	1 (7)
10 juni 2019
Moerse Boys	2
Bemmel	1

Final
16 juni 2019
VKW	0
Moerse Boys	1

First round
30 mei 2019
Rohda Raalte	4
BVC '12	1
30 mei 2019
Nemelaer	1
Leones	2
30 mei 2019
VUC	2
DHC Delft (a.e.t.)	3

Second round
2 juni 2019
SV TOP (pen.)	2 (5)
Rohda Raalte	2 (4)
2 juni 2019
ZSV	0
Leonidas	2
2 juni 2019
JOS Watergraafsmeer	5
Leones	1
2 juni 2019
Sneek Wit Zwart	1
DHC Delft	3

Third round
10 juni 2019
SV TOP	0
Leonidas	3
10 juni 2019
JOS Watergraafsmeer	3
DHC Delft	1

Final
16 juni 2019
Leonidas	1
JOS Watergraafsmeer (a.e.t.)	3

Moerse Boys and JOS Watergraafsmeer promoted to the 2019-20 Hoofdklasse Sunday.
De Bataven, Vlissingen and Fortuna Wormerveer relegated to the 2019-20 Eerste Klasse Sunday.
VKW and Leonidas played an extra match.
The other teams remained in the 2019-20 Eerste Klasse Sunday.

==== Extra match ====
Because JVC Cuijk, relegated from the Derde Divisie, decided to stop playing football at top amateur levels completely, due to lack of the necessary funds, an extra spot became available in the Hoofdklasse Sunday leagues. Therefore the two teams who lost in the fourth round of the play-offs were given a second chance. In an extra match, on neutral ground, these teams competed for the spot that became available.

VKW	0–1	Leonidas

Leonidas maintained in the 2019-20 Hoofdklasse Saturday Sunday.
VKW remained in the 2019-20 Eerste Klasse Sunday.

== Sources ==
- hollandsevelden.nl (in Dutch)
