= 2024–25 Vierde Divisie =

Vierde Divisie
- Season: 2024–25

The 2024–25 Vierde Divisie is a Dutch football league season played in four sections. The champions of each Vierde Divisie section will be directly promoted to the Derde Divisie; other teams can get promoted through play-offs.

== Vierde Divisie A ==
Vierde Divisie A
- Season: 2024–25
- Champions: Scherpenzeel
- Promoted: Scherpenzeel
- Relegated: VVOG; Zuidvogels; Kolping Boys

=== Teams ===
Location of teams in the Vierde Divisie A 2024-25
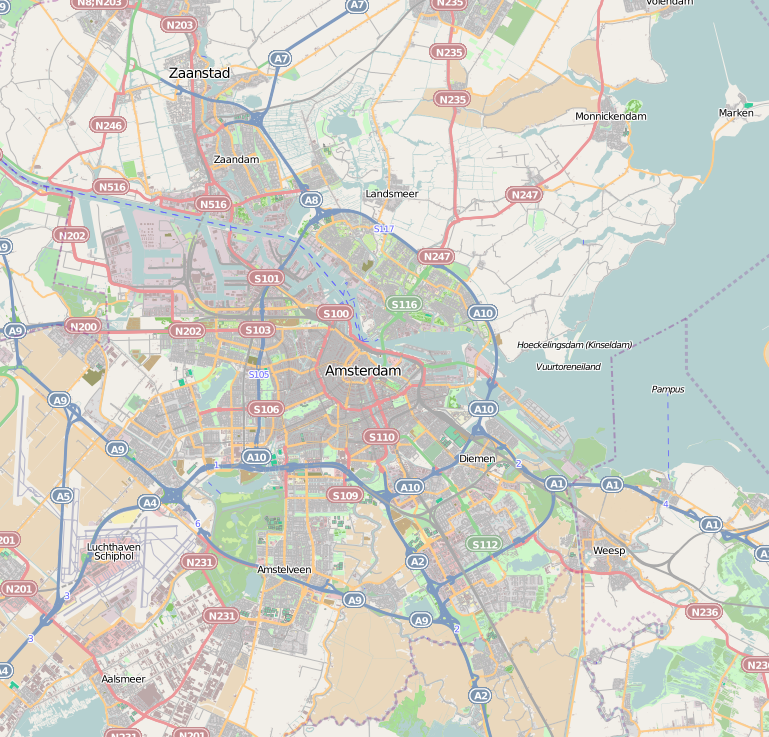
Amsterdam teams in the Vierde Divisie A 2024-25

Club	Home City
AFC '34	Alkmaar
DVVA	Amsterdam
Hollandia	Hoorn
Hoogland	Hoogland
JOS Watergraafsmeer	Amsterdam
Kampong	Utrecht
Kolping Boys	Oudorp
ODIN '59	Heemskerk
Purmersteijn	Purmerend
Scherpenzeel	Scherpenzeel
SDV	Barneveld
SJC	Noordwijk
Swift	Amsterdam
Ter Leede	Sassenheim
VVOG	Harderwijk
Zuidvogels	Huizen

=== Number of teams by province ===
Number of teams	Province	Team(s)
9	North Holland	AFC '34, DVVA, Hollandia, JOS Watergraafsmeer, Kolping Boys, ODIN '59, Purmersteijn, Swift, Zuidvogels
3	Gelderland	Scherpenzeel, SDV, VVOG
2	Utrecht	Hoogland, Kampong
2	South Holland	SJC, Ter Leede

=== Standings ===
Pos	Team	Pld	W	D	L	GF	GA	GD	Pts	Promotion, qualification or relegation
1	Scherpenzeel (Note: Winner of the Third Period (Rounds 21–30)) (C, P)	30	19	4	7	58	36	+22	61	Promotion to Derde Divisie
2	JOS Watergraafsmeer (Note: Winner of the Second Period (Rounds 11–20))	30	17	4	9	59	37	+22	55	Qualification for promotion play-offs
3	Kampong	30	14	6	10	43	33	+10	48	Qualification for promotion play-offs
4	SJC	30	14	6	10	49	49	0	48	Qualification for promotion play-offs
5	Hoogland	30	12	9	9	47	41	+6	45	
6	AFC '34	30	11	10	9	49	42	+7	43	
7	Hollandia	30	12	6	12	53	45	+8	42	
8	Swift	30	10	12	8	46	42	+4	42	
9	SDV	30	11	9	10	39	43	−4	42	
10	Purmersteijn	30	12	3	15	53	52	+1	39	
11	ODIN '59	30	11	6	13	50	55	−5	39	
12	DVVA	30	12	3	15	37	48	−11	39	
13	VVOG (Note: Winner of the First Period (Rounds 1–10)) (R)	30	12	1	17	42	53	−11	37	Qualification for relegation play-offs
14	Ter Leede (O)	30	7	13	10	36	48	−12	34	Qualification for relegation play-offs
15	Zuidvogels (R)	30	8	4	18	34	57	−23	28	Relegation to Eerste Klasse
16	Kolping Boys (R)	30	8	4	18	40	54	−14	28	Relegation to Eerste Klasse

Source: Hollandsevelden
Rules for classification: Season in progress: 1) Most points won; 2) Less points lost; 3) Goal difference; 4) Goals scored; 5) Alphabetical order; End of season: 1) Points; 2) Goal difference; 3) Goals scored; 4) Head-to-head points; 5) Head-to-head goal difference; 6) Head-to-head away goals scored; 7) Play-off if relevant for deciding champion, relegation or participating in a European league, otherwise by draw. 8) Penalty shoot-out (only after a play-off)
(C) Champions; (O) Play-off winners; (P) Promoted; (R) Relegated

=== Fixtures/results ===
Home \ Away	AFC	DVV	HOL	HOO	JOS	KAM	KOL	ODI	PUR	SCH	SDV	SJC	SWI	TER	VVO	ZUI
AFC '34		2–1	2–1	1–1	2–1	1–2	2–2	3–0	2–3	0–1	1–1	1–1	2–2	1–1	2–3	1–0
DVVA	1–1		2–1	1–2	2–1	1–0	5–1	0–3	2–1	1–3	0–4	3–0	1–0	0–0	0–1	2–1
Hollandia	1–1	2–0		2–0	0–4	3–0	3–0	0–2	4–1	0–1	1–1	4–1	3–1	1–2	1–2	3–0
Hoogland	1–1	2–0	2–0		1–2	0–1	3–1	2–0	1–1	1–2	1–1	3–0	0–0	0–0	3–2	1–3
JOS Watergraafsmeer	3–1	2–0	2–1	3–2		2–0	3–1	4–2	1–6	1–2	4–1	3–1	0–1	3–0	1–0	6–0
Kampong	2–1	3–0	2–1	0–3	0–1		2–0	1–0	3–0	1–2	0–0	2–1	3–1	1–1	2–2	1–1
Kolping Boys	1–2	1–0	5–2	2–2	0–2	2–0		2–2	1–1	1–0	0–1	1–2	0–1	2–3	2–1	2–1
ODIN '59	0–3	1–2	2–4	4–2	3–2	3–2	3–2		0–2	1–3	3–1	2–2	1–1	4–4	0–4	3–0
Purmersteijn	3–4	1–2	1–2	2–1	1–2	1–0	3–1	0–1		0–2	5–2	1–2	3–3	3–0	2–1	1–3
Scherpenzeel	3–1	2–0	1–3	5–1	1–1	1–5	0–2	4–0	1–2		1–0	2–1	1–1	4–0	0–4	2–2
SDV	0–4	2–2	2–2	2–0	1–1	1–4	2–1	1–0	2–0	0–2		1–3	2–1	0–0	3–1	2–1
SJC	1–0	2–1	2–2	0–0	3–2	1–1	1–4	1–1	2–1	2–1	3–1		1–3	3–0	4–1	3–0
Swift	4–1	3–1	1–1	2–4	0–0	1–1	2–1	2–0	2–1	2–3	0–0	5–2		3–3	1–2	0–3
Ter Leede	1–1	3–4	0–1	1–1	1–1	2–1	1–0	3–3	0–1	1–1	2–1	0–2	1–1		1–0	1–2
VVOG	1–2	2–1	3–2	2–3	0–2	0–2	2–1	0–2	4–1	2–4	0–3	2–0	0–1	1–3		2–1
Zuidvogels	0–3	1–2	2–2	1–3	3–0	0–1	2–1	2–1	1–5	0–3	0–1	1–2	1–1	2–1	0–1	

Source: Hollandsevelden
Legend: Blue = home team win; Yellow = draw; Red = away team win.

== Vierde Divisie B ==
Vierde Divisie B
- Season: 2024–25
- Champions: Zwaluwen
- Promoted: Zwaluwen
- Relegated: Forum Sport; Unitas; WNC; RVVH

=== Teams ===
Location of teams in the Vierde Divisie B 2024-25
South Holland teams in the Vierde Divisie B 2024-25

Club	Home City
Achilles Veen	Veen
Capelle	Capelle aan den IJssel
Feyenoord	Rotterdam
Forum Sport	Voorburg
Halsteren	Halsteren
HBS	Den Haag
Heerjansdam	Heerjansdam
LRC	Leerdam
Poortugaal	Poortugaal
RKAVV	Leidschendam
RVVH	Ridderkerk
Unitas	Gorinchem
Westlandia	Naaldwijk
WNC	Waardenburg
XerxesDZB	Rotterdam
Zwaluwen	Vlaardingen

=== Number of teams by province ===
Number of teams	Province	Team(s)
12	South Holland	Capelle, Feyenoord, Forum Sport, HBS, Heerjansdam, Poortugaal, RKAVV, RVVH, Unitas, Westlandia, XerxesDZB, Zwaluwen
2	North Brabant	Achilles Veen, Halsteren
1	Gelderland	WNC
1	Utrecht	LRC

=== Standings ===
Pos	Team	Pld	W	D	L	GF	GA	GD	Pts	Promotion, qualification or relegation
1	Zwaluwen (Note: Winner of the Second Period (Rounds 11–20)) (C, P)	30	20	5	5	67	35	+32	65	Promotion to Derde Divisie
2	XerxesDZB (Note: Winner of the First Period (Rounds 1–10))	30	18	6	6	54	33	+21	60	Qualification for promotion play-offs
3	Poortugaal	30	16	6	8	60	47	+13	54	Qualification for promotion play-offs
4	LRC	30	16	4	10	72	45	+27	52	
5	Westlandia	30	15	6	9	47	43	+4	51	
6	Capelle	30	12	9	9	51	48	+3	45	
7	RKAVV (Note: Winner of the Third Period (Rounds 21–30))	30	13	4	13	58	49	+9	43	Qualification for promotion play-offs
8	Heerjansdam	30	11	7	12	55	47	+8	40	
9	Feyenoord	30	10	10	10	61	60	+1	40	
10	Halsteren	30	10	6	14	43	63	−20	36	
11	Achilles Veen	30	10	5	15	45	56	−11	35	
12	HBS	30	8	9	13	39	49	−10	33	
13	Forum Sport (R)	30	8	7	15	34	49	−15	31	Qualification for relegation play-offs
14	Unitas (R)	30	6	11	13	34	46	−12	29	Qualification for relegation play-offs
15	WNC (R)	30	8	5	17	35	61	−26	29	Relegation to Eerste Klasse
16	RVVH (R)	30	8	2	20	38	62	−24	26	Relegation to Eerste Klasse

Source: Hollandsevelden
Rules for classification: Season in progress: 1) Most points won; 2) Less points lost; 3) Goal difference; 4) Goals scored; 5) Alphabetical order; End of season: 1) Points; 2) Goal difference; 3) Goals scored; 4) Head-to-head points; 5) Head-to-head goal difference; 6) Head-to-head away goals scored; 7) Play-off if relevant for deciding champion, relegation or participating in a European league, otherwise by draw. 8) Penalty shoot-out (only after a play-off)
(C) Champions; (P) Promoted; (R) Relegated

=== Fixtures/results ===
Home \ Away	ACH	CAP	FEY	FOR	HAL	HBS	HEE	LRC	POO	RKA	RVV	UNI	WES	WNC	XER	ZWA
Achilles Veen		1–1	2–2	0–0	4–1	2–0	0–3	0–5	4–0	2–4	5–0	2–1	2–1	2–0	0–2	0–5
Capelle	3–2		0–2	2–0	2–2	3–2	1–1	1–1	1–1	1–1	2–2	1–1	1–0	2–1	1–2	1–3
Feyenoord	1–1	0–1		1–3	3–0	1–1	0–4	4–1	2–2	1–2	0–1	5–3	4–1	1–1	2–2	1–2
Forum Sport	2–1	0–1	1–3		1–2	1–1	1–2	0–0	2–5	1–0	2–0	0–2	1–2	3–2	2–2	0–4
Halsteren	3–0	2–4	2–4	3–0		2–2	6–3	1–0	2–1	0–2	0–2	1–1	0–1	4–0	0–2	0–0
HBS	4–0	1–1	1–3	1–0	1–1		1–1	2–3	0–0	2–1	2–0	0–0	0–2	3–0	0–2	2–3
Heerjansdam	0–2	3–2	2–2	1–2	5–1	4–0		2–0	1–1	1–1	2–1	3–3	3–4	5–0	2–0	1–2
LRC	3–1	2–4	1–1	1–2	10–1	4–1	4–2		1–2	3–2	3–1	1–0	2–2	1–2	1–2	3–1
Poortugaal	1–4	2–1	7–3	2–1	2–1	3–1	2–0	1–4		1–3	2–1	1–0	1–2	4–0	2–1	2–2
RKAVV	2–1	1–4	4–2	2–3	1–2	2–4	1–1	2–1	3–0		5–2	2–0	2–2	0–2	0–1	3–4
RVVH	3–1	2–3	2–1	2–2	5–0	2–3	1–0	0–3	1–4	1–3		1–2	0–2	3–0	1–2	1–4
Unitas	2–0	0–2	1–1	2–2	1–1	2–1	2–0	2–3	1–2	0–3	2–0		0–2	1–2	1–1	2–2
Westlandia	0–2	3–1	2–2	2–2	0–1	0–1	2–1	2–4	3–2	2–0	2–1	1–0		1–0	0–3	3–2
WNC	2–2	3–0	4–5	1–0	1–4	2–2	1–0	1–2	0–2	2–1	0–1	2–2	1–1		1–4	1–3
XerxesDZB	3–1	4–2	4–1	1–0	3–0	2–0	0–1	1–4	0–3	2–5	3–1	0–0	2–2	1–0		0–0
Zwaluwen	2–1	3–2	2–3	1–0	2–0	2–0	4–1	2–1	2–2	1–0	2–0	4–0	2–0	1–3	0–2	

Source: Hollandsevelden
Legend: Blue = home team win; Yellow = draw; Red = away team win.

== Vierde Divisie C ==
Vierde Divisie C
- Season: 2024–25
- Champions: UDI '19
- Promoted: UDI '19; Groene Ster; RBC
- Relegated: Nuenen; Best Vooruit

=== Teams ===
Location of teams in the Vierde Divisie C 2024-25
North Brabant teams in the Vierde Divisie C 2024-25

Club	Home City
AWC	Wijchen
Baronie	Breda
Best Vooruit	Best
Dongen	Dongen
EVV	Echt
Groene Ster	Heerlerheide
Juliana '31	Malden
MASV	Arnhem
Mierlo-Hout	Helmond
Nuenen	Nuenen
Orion	Nijmegen
RBC	Roosendaal
UDI '19	Uden
Valkenswaard	Valkenswaard
Venray	Venray
Wittenhorst	Horst

=== Number of teams by province ===
Number of teams	Province	Team(s)
8	North Brabant	Baronie, Best Vooruit, Dongen, Mierlo-Hout, Nuenen, RBC, UDI '19, Valkenswaard
4	Gelderland	AWC, Juliana '31, MASV, Orion
4	Limburg	EVV, Groene Ster, Venray, Wittenhorst

=== Standings ===
Pos	Team	Pld	W	D	L	GF	GA	GD	Pts	Promotion, qualification or relegation
1	UDI '19 (Note: Winner of the First and Second Period (Rounds 1–10 and 11–20)) (C, P)	30	21	5	4	66	33	+33	68	Promotion to Derde Divisie
2	Groene Ster (Note: Winner of the Third Period (Rounds 21–30)) (P)	30	20	7	3	69	24	+45	67	Qualification for promotion play-offs
3	RBC (P)	30	15	10	5	66	32	+34	55	Qualification for promotion play-offs
4	Orion	30	13	6	11	39	44	−5	45	Qualification for promotion play-offs
5	Wittenhorst	30	13	3	14	57	48	+9	42	
6	AWC	30	11	9	10	48	44	+4	42	
7	Baronie	30	11	8	11	36	40	−4	41	
8	Juliana '31	30	10	10	10	40	32	+8	40	
9	MASV	30	10	8	12	40	54	−14	38	
10	Dongen	30	11	4	15	45	50	−5	37	
11	Valkenswaard	30	9	7	14	42	60	−18	34	
12	Venray	30	9	6	15	43	53	−10	33	
13	Mierlo-Hout (O)	30	10	3	17	52	72	−20	33	Qualification for relegation play-offs
14	EVV (O)	30	8	7	15	38	50	−12	31	Qualification for relegation play-offs
15	Nuenen (R)	30	8	7	15	45	64	−19	31	Relegation to Eerste Klasse
16	Best Vooruit (R)	30	9	4	17	35	61	−26	31	Relegation to Eerste Klasse

Source: Hollandsevelden
Rules for classification: Season in progress: 1) Most points won; 2) Less points lost; 3) Goal difference; 4) Goals scored; 5) Alphabetical order; End of season: 1) Points; 2) Goal difference; 3) Goals scored; 4) Head-to-head points; 5) Head-to-head goal difference; 6) Head-to-head away goals scored; 7) Play-off if relevant for deciding champion, relegation or participating in a European league, otherwise by draw. 8) Penalty shoot-out (only after a play-off)
(C) Champions; (O) Play-off winners; (P) Promoted; (R) Relegated

=== Fixtures/results ===
Home \ Away	AWC	BAR	BES	DON	EVV	GRO	JUL	MAS	MIE	NUE	ORI	RBC	UDI	VAL	VEN	WIT
AWC		1–1	1–2	1–3	1–1	1–1	0–1	1–1	4–0	6–2	0–0	0–4	0–1	4–4	2–1	2–4
Baronie	2–1		0–2	2–0	0–2	0–6	1–0	1–2	2–1	3–0	1–0	3–1	1–2	2–0	0–2	4–1
Best Vooruit	0–1	1–0		0–1	1–1	0–4	0–4	1–0	1–5	1–5	4–1	1–5	1–2	2–1	5–0	0–3
Dongen	1–2	1–1	1–3		2–0	4–1	1–2	1–2	3–1	0–1	4–0	2–3	2–4	0–0	1–2	1–7
EVV	0–1	2–2	4–3	3–1		0–1	0–0	2–0	1–3	6–1	1–2	1–3	0–1	1–1	2–1	0–1
Groene Ster	2–0	3–1	6–0	2–0	2–2		0–0	0–0	1–1	1–0	1–0	0–0	3–1	5–1	4–1	4–1
Juliana '31	2–2	0–0	1–1	0–1	3–0	1–1		3–0	4–2	0–3	0–1	1–1	0–1	2–2	3–1	2–0
MASV	0–2	4–1	1–1	1–6	3–0	1–2	2–2		1–0	1–0	1–1	0–4	4–1	2–0	2–2	1–4
Mierlo-Hout	3–4	2–2	2–0	6–1	2–1	2–1	1–5	2–1		1–4	1–2	2–6	1–4	2–3	2–4	0–3
Nuenen	1–1	0–1	3–0	2–0	0–2	1–4	0–2	3–3	1–1		1–1	2–2	1–2	2–2	0–1	2–1
Orion	2–1	0–1	1–0	1–1	2–0	1–5	1–0	5–0	2–2	2–2		1–3	0–3	1–2	2–1	5–3
RBC	0–0	0–0	1–2	1–1	2–2	1–3	3–0	4–0	4–0	4–2	0–1		2–3	2–0	2–0	3–1
UDI '19	1–2	2–2	2–2	1–0	5–2	2–0	1–0	3–0	2–0	7–1	2–1	1–1		1–2	3–3	2–1
Valkenswaard	0–4	1–1	2–1	0–3	3–0	2–3	2–1	1–5	1–2	2–1	0–1	1–2	0–3		2–1	3–1
Venray	1–2	1–1	1–0	0–1	0–1	0–1	1–1	1–1	1–4	5–1	1–2	2–2	0–2	3–2		2–0
Wittenhorst	3–1	1–0	2–0	1–2	3–1	0–2	3–0	0–1	3–0	2–3	3–0	0–0	1–1	2–2	2–4	

Source: Hollandsevelden
Legend: Blue = home team win; Yellow = draw; Red = away team win.

== Vierde Divisie D ==
Vierde Divisie D
- Season: 2024–25
- Champions: Hoogeveen
- Promoted: Hoogeveen; Staphorst
- Relegated: Berkum; Apeldoorn; KHC

=== Teams ===
Location of teams in the Vierde Divisie D 2024-25
Overijssel teams in the Vierde Divisie D 2024-25

Club	Home City
Apeldoorn	Apeldoorn
AZSV	Aalten
Berkum	Zwolle
DETO	Vriezenveen
DZC '68	Doetinchem
Flevo Boys	Emmeloord
Heino	Heino
Hoogeveen	Hoogeveen
HZVV	Hoogeveen
KHC	Kampen
Olde Veste	Steenwijk
ONS Sneek	Sneek
Quick '20	Oldenzaal
Staphorst	Staphorst
TVC '28	Tubbergen
WHC	Wezep

=== Number of teams by province ===
Number of teams	Province	Team(s)
8	Overijssel	Berkum, DETO, Heino, KHC, Olde Veste, Quick '20, Staphorst, TVC '28
4	Gelderland	Apeldoorn, AZSV, DZC '68, WHC
2	Drenthe	Hoogeveen, HZVV
1	Flevoland	Flevo Boys
1	Friesland	ONS Sneek

=== Standings ===
Pos	Team	Pld	W	D	L	GF	GA	GD	Pts	Promotion, qualification or relegation
1	Hoogeveen (Note: Winner of the First and Third Period (Rounds 1–10 and 21–30)) (C, P)	30	21	6	3	78	35	+43	69	Promotion to Derde Divisie
2	Staphorst (Note: Winner of the Second Period (Rounds 11–20)) (P)	30	21	5	4	81	31	+50	68	Qualification for promotion play-offs
3	Flevo Boys	30	17	4	9	67	50	+17	55	Qualification for promotion play-offs
4	Quick '20	30	14	8	8	59	39	+20	50	
5	Heino	30	13	7	10	55	52	+3	46	Qualification for promotion play-offs
6	ONS Sneek	30	14	4	12	66	66	0	46	
7	Olde Veste	30	13	6	11	67	56	+11	45	
8	DETO	30	12	7	11	54	43	+11	43	
9	TVC '28	30	12	6	12	58	74	−16	42	
10	AZSV	30	11	6	13	48	53	−5	39	
11	HZVV	30	11	6	13	55	62	−7	39	
12	DZC '68	30	11	4	15	45	49	−4	37	
13	Berkum (R)	30	9	7	14	41	58	−17	34	Qualification for relegation play-offs
14	WHC (O)	30	7	5	18	34	58	−24	26	Qualification for relegation play-offs
15	Apeldoorn (R)	30	4	8	18	43	78	−35	20	Relegation to Eerste Klasse
16	KHC (R)	30	3	5	22	32	79	−47	14	Relegation to Eerste Klasse

Source: Hollandsevelden
Rules for classification: Season in progress: 1) Most points won; 2) Less points lost; 3) Goal difference; 4) Goals scored; 5) Alphabetical order; End of season: 1) Points; 2) Goal difference; 3) Goals scored; 4) Head-to-head points; 5) Head-to-head goal difference; 6) Head-to-head away goals scored; 7) Play-off if relevant for deciding champion, relegation or participating in a European league, otherwise by draw. 8) Penalty shoot-out (only after a play-off)
(C) Champions; (O) Play-off winners; (P) Promoted; (R) Relegated

=== Fixtures/results ===
Home \ Away	APE	AZS	BER	DET	DZC	FLE	HEI	HOO	HZV	KHC	OLD	ONS	QUI	STA	TVC	WHC
Apeldoorn		0–2	0–0	3–1	1–3	0–4	1–1	1–2	2–2	1–3	4–5	4–1	0–5	1–1	1–1	1–0
AZSV	2–0		0–1	1–1	4–2	6–1	1–2	0–2	1–1	2–2	2–1	3–1	1–1	1–0	2–2	0–1
Berkum	2–1	1–1		3–2	0–1	2–4	2–1	1–3	4–3	2–3	2–2	3–4	0–3	0–4	3–3	1–0
DETO	3–1	0–1	1–1		4–0	5–0	3–0	2–2	2–0	3–0	2–3	3–2	1–1	0–1	0–1	0–0
DZC '68	3–1	2–0	0–1	2–2		0–1	2–1	0–2	1–2	0–0	4–1	1–0	1–3	1–3	4–0	2–0
Flevo Boys	1–3	3–0	2–0	1–3	3–1		0–1	0–4	3–0	5–2	4–1	5–1	4–3	5–2	4–1	3–1
Heino	3–3	4–3	4–2	4–0	2–2	1–1		3–2	5–3	1–1	0–0	2–3	1–0	1–2	2–6	2–0
Hoogeveen	3–2	5–2	3–0	4–2	3–0	2–0	0–0		1–1	2–0	1–0	7–2	4–0	1–1	1–1	4–1
HZVV	4–2	0–3	3–0	0–0	5–4	2–2	2–1	0–4		3–0	2–0	4–0	2–2	3–6	2–3	1–2
KHC	1–1	1–2	1–4	0–4	0–0	1–2	3–4	2–3	0–2		2–3	2–0	0–3	1–4	1–2	0–1
Olde Veste	7–1	2–1	2–1	3–1	1–0	2–2	3–0	1–2	1–3	7–0		1–3	2–3	3–1	4–2	2–2
ONS Sneek	4–1	4–3	1–1	2–1	3–2	3–2	2–3	2–3	3–0	7–1	2–2		2–2	1–1	3–2	3–0
Quick '20	1–1	5–1	0–2	0–1	3–1	0–0	3–1	2–2	2–0	2–1	3–0	2–1		1–5	4–0	2–0
Staphorst	6–1	6–1	1–1	5–1	2–0	1–0	1–2	4–1	3–0	3–1	2–0	2–1	1–0		2–2	4–0
TVC '28	4–3	2–1	2–1	1–4	0–4	2–3	1–0	4–2	1–3	2–1	2–6	2–3	3–2	0–4		3–3
WHC	3–2	0–1	3–0	1–2	1–2	0–2	0–3	1–3	4–2	4–2	2–2	1–2	1–1	1–3	1–3	

Source: Hollandsevelden
Legend: Blue = home team win; Yellow = draw; Red = away team win.

== Play-offs ==
=== Derde Divisie promotion/relegation playoffs ===
The teams who finish 15th and 16th in both the Derde Divisie A and B will play relegation playoffs against teams from the Vierde Divisie. The four bracket winners will play in next season's Derde Divisie.

==== Derde Divisie A ====
===== Bracket 1 =====
Semifinals
Staphorst	0	6	6
SJC	0	2	2
Ajax	2	0	2
Kampong	4	1	5

Final
Staphorst	2	2	4
Kampong	0	2	2

====== Semifinals ======
31 May 2025
14:30

Kampong	4–2	Ajax

4 June 2025
20:00

Ajax	0–1	Kampong

Kampong won 5–2 on aggregate.

28 May 2025
20:00

SJC	0–0	Staphorst

31 May 2025
14:30

Staphorst	6–2	SJC

Staphorst won 6–2 on aggregate.

====== Final ======
7 June 2025
14:30

Kampong	0–2	Staphorst

11 June 2025
20:00

Staphorst	2–2	Kampong

Staphorst won 4–2 on aggregate.

===== Bracket 2 =====
Semifinals
JOS Watergraafsmeer	0	1	1
Heino	0	0	0
Excelsior '31	3	5	8
Flevo Boys	0	1	1

Final
JOS Watergraafsmeer	0	2	2
Excelsior '31	1	2	3

====== Semifinals ======
28 May 2025
20:00

Flevo Boys	0–3	Excelsior '31

31 May 2025
14:30

Excelsior '31	5–1	Flevo Boys

Excelsior '31 won 8–1 on aggregate.

28 May 2025
20:00

Heino	0–0	JOS Watergraafsmeer

1 June 2025
14:00

JOS Watergraafsmeer	1–0	Heino

JOS Watergraafsmeer won 1–0 on aggregate.

====== Final ======
4 June 2025
20:00

Excelsior '31	1–0	JOS Watergraafsmeer

7 June 2025
14:30

JOS Watergraafsmeer	2–2	Excelsior '31

Excelsior '31 won 3–2 on aggregate.

==== Derde Divisie B ====
===== Bracket 1 =====
Semifinals
Groene Ster	1	1	2
RKAVV	1	0	1
's-Gravenzande	3	2	5
Poortugaal	0	2	2

Final
Groene Ster	1	4	5
's-Gravenzande	0	3	3

====== Semifinals ======
31 May 2025
14:30

Poortugaal	0–3	's-Gravenzande

4 June 2025
20:00

's-Gravenzande	2–2	Poortugaal

's-Gravenzande won 5–2 on aggregate.

4 June 2025
20:00

RKAVV	1–1	Groene Ster

8 June 2025
14:30

Groene Ster	1–0	RKAVV

Groene Ster won 2–1 on aggregate.

====== Final ======
11 June 2025
20:00

's-Gravenzande	0–1	Groene Ster

14 June 2025
14:30

Groene Ster	4–3	's-Gravenzande

Groene Ster won 5–3 on aggregate.

===== Bracket 2 =====
Semifinals
XerxesDZB	1	2	3
Orion	0	2	2
OJC	2	1	3
RBC	3	2	5

Final
XerxesDZB	0	2	2
RBC	5	0	5

====== Semifinals ======
28 May 2025
20:00

RBC	3–2	OJC

1 June 2025
14:00

OJC	1–2	RBC

RBC won 5–3 on aggregate.

28 May 2025
20:00

Orion	0–1	XerxesDZB

31 May 2025
14:30

XerxesDZB	2–2	Orion

XerxesDZB won 3–2 on aggregate.

====== Final ======
4 June 2025
20:00

RBC	5–0	XerxesDZB

7 June 2025
14:30

XerxesDZB	2–0	RBC

RBC won 5–2 on aggregate.
