= 2018–19 Derde Divisie =

Derde Divisie
- Season: 2018–19
- Champions: Sat: Noordwijk; Sun: Jong Volendam
- Promoted: Sat: Noordwijk; Quick Boys; ASWH; Sun: Jong Volendam; TEC
- Relegated: Sat: Eemdijk; SJC; ASV De Dijk; Achilles '29; Sun: JVC Cuijk; OJC Rosmalen; Quick '20; HBS Craeyenhout

The 2018–19 Derde Divisie season was the third in the new Dutch fourth tier. They played before that in the Topklasse, until the restructuring of the Dutch football league system in the summer of 2016.

In May 2019, the referee scored a goal for HSV Hoek against Harkemase Boys. The goal was all the more noteworthy because it occurred on the last weekend possible before rules changes came into effect from 1 June to stop this kind of activity on the part of the referee.

== Saturday league ==
=== Teams ===
Location of teams in the Derde Divisie Saturday 2018-19

Club	Location	Venue	Capacity	Manager
Achilles '29	Groesbeek	Sportpark De Heikant	4,500	Johan van Osch
Ajax (amateurs)	Amsterdam	Sportpark De Toekomst	2,050	Yuri Rose
ASWH	Hendrik-Ido-Ambacht	Sportpark Schildman	3,000	Cesco Agterberg
ASV De Dijk	Amsterdam	Sportpark Schellingwoude	1,500	Jochem Twisker
DOVO	Veenendaal	Sportpark Panhuis	3,200	Gert Kruys
DVS '33	Ermelo	Sportlaan	5,000	Bert van Hunenstijn
Eemdijk	Bunschoten-Spakenburg	Sportpark De Vinken	1,200	Patrick Loenen
Lisse	Lisse	Sportpark Ter Specke	7,000	Robbert de Ruiter
Harkemase Boys	Harkema	Sportpark De Bosk	6,000	Tieme Klompe
HSV Hoek	Hoek	Sportpark Denoek	2,500	Hugo Vandenheede
Jong Groningen	Groningen	Sportpark Corpus den Hoorn	1,500	Alfons Arts
Noordwijk	Noordwijk	Sportpark Duin Wetering	6,100	Kees Zethof
ODIN '59	Heemskerk	Sportpark Assumburg	3,000	Richard Plug
ONS Sneek	Sneek	Zuidersportpark	3,150	Chris de Wagt
Quick Boys	Katwijk aan Zee	Sportpark Nieuw Zuid	8,200	Erik Assink
SJC	Noordwijk	Sportpark Lageweg	3,000	Sjaak Polak
SteDoCo	Hoornaar	Sportpark SteDoCo	1,000	Gijs Zwaan
VVOG	Harderwijk	Sportpark De Strokel	10,000	Ed Engelkes

=== Standings ===
Pos	Team	Pld	W	D	L	GF	GA	GD	Pts	Promotion, qualification or relegation
1	Noordwijk (Note: Winner of the first period (games 1-12).) (C, P)	34	25	5	4	94	41	+53	80	Promotion to Tweede Divisie
2	Quick Boys (Note: Substitute winner of the first period (games 1-12).) (O, P)	34	22	6	6	84	40	+44	72	Qualification to promotion play-offs
3	DVS '33	34	21	5	8	102	47	+55	68	
4	Hoek (Note: Winner of the second period (games 13-23).)	34	19	7	8	82	55	+27	64	Qualification to promotion play-offs
5	Jong Groningen	34	17	7	10	66	39	+27	58	
6	Harkemase Boys	34	17	6	11	68	59	+9	57	
7	ASWH (Note: Winner of the third period (games 24-34).) (O, P)	34	16	7	11	74	54	+20	55	Qualification to promotion play-offs
8	SteDoCo	34	17	4	13	65	56	+9	55	
9	ODIN '59	34	17	3	14	71	66	+5	54	
10	Lisse	34	16	3	15	62	64	−2	51	
11	DOVO	34	14	6	14	76	66	+10	48	
12	Ajax (amateurs)	34	12	5	17	52	61	−9	41	
13	ONS Sneek	34	12	3	19	57	58	−1	39	
14	VVOG	34	9	8	17	41	72	−31	35	
15	Eemdijk (R)	34	9	2	23	51	87	−36	29	Qualification to relegation play-offs
16	SJC (R)	34	8	2	24	50	105	−55	26	Qualification to relegation play-offs
17	ASV De Dijk (R)	34	4	7	23	49	111	−62	19	Relegation to Hoofdklasse
18	Achilles '29 (Note: On 8 April 2019 Achilles '29 were deducted one point for not meeting the requirements regarding the annual financial reports. On 2 May 2019 they were deducted an additional three points for still not meeting the same requirement.) (R)	34	4	8	22	44	107	−63	16	Relegation to Hoofdklasse

Source: Soccerway
Rules for classification: 1) points; 2) goal difference; 3) number of goals scored
(C) Champions; (O) Play-off winners; (P) Promoted; (R) Relegated

== Sunday league ==
=== Teams ===
Location of teams in the Derde Divisie Sunday 2018-19

Club	Location	Venue	Capacity	Manager
ADO '20	Heemskerk	Sportpark De Vlotter	1,100	Peter van Kersbergen
Blauw Geel '38	Veghel	PWA Sportpark	2,500	Niels van Casteren
VV Dongen	Dongen	Sportpark De Biezen	1,800	Ruud Kaiser
EVV	Echt	Sportpark In de Bandert	2,000	Tini Ruijs
GOES	Goes	Sportpark Het Schenge	6,000	Roger Veenstra
HBS Craeyenhout	The Hague	Sportpark Daal en Bergselaan	1,000	Marcel Koning
USV Hercules	Utrecht	Sportpark Voordorp	800	Jochen Twisker
HSC '21	Haaksbergen	Groot Scholtenhagen	4,500	Daniël Nijhof
Jong Volendam	Volendam	Kras Stadion	7,384	Johan Steur
JVC Cuijk	Cuijk	Sportpark De Groenendijkse	3,000	Ferdi Akankan
OFC	Oostzaan	Sportpark OFC	1,500	Eric Heerings
OJC Rosmalen	Rosmalen	Sportpark De Groote Wielen	3,000	Bas Gösgens
OSS '20	Oss	Sportpark De Rusheuvel	4,000	Bertran Kreekels
Quick '20	Oldenzaal	Vondersweijde	7,000	Michel Steggink
Quick (H)	The Hague	Sportpark Nieuw Hanenburg	1,500	Paul van der Zwaan
TEC	Tiel	Sportpark De Lok	12,000	Frits van den Berk
VV UNA	Veldhoven	Sportpark Zeelst	1,000	Jeroen van Bezouwen
RKVV Westlandia	Naaldwijk	Sportpark De Hoge Bomen	4,000	Edwin Grünholz

=== Standings ===
Pos	Team	Pld	W	D	L	GF	GA	GD	Pts	Promotion, qualification or relegation
1	Jong Volendam (C, P)	34	22	5	7	97	44	+53	71	Promotion to Tweede Divisie
2	TEC (Note: Winner of the first period (games 1-12).) (P)	34	21	7	6	63	38	+25	70	Promotion to Tweede Divisie
3	OFC (Note: Substitute winner of the first period (games 1-12).)	34	18	8	8	79	43	+36	62	Qualification to promotion play-offs
4	GOES (Note: Winner of the third period (games 24-34).)	34	20	1	13	80	55	+25	61	Qualification to promotion play-offs
5	UNA	34	17	5	12	68	55	+13	56	
6	OSS '20 (Note: Winner of the second period (games 13-23).)	34	16	6	12	70	53	+17	54	Qualification to promotion play-offs
7	Quick (H)	34	15	5	14	67	66	+1	50	
8	ADO '20	34	13	8	13	59	57	+2	47	
9	Westlandia	34	14	4	16	59	73	−14	46	
10	Dongen	34	14	3	17	51	70	−19	45	
11	USV Hercules	34	12	8	14	55	63	−8	44	
12	HSC '21	34	14	2	18	51	73	−22	44	
13	Blauw Geel '38	34	12	7	15	62	65	−3	43	
14	EVV (Note: EVV were deducted one point for no certified youth training and/or not having the required number of registered contract players.)	34	11	9	14	39	43	−4	41	
15	JVC Cuijk (R)	34	12	3	19	43	77	−34	39	Qualification to relegation play-offs
16	OJC Rosmalen (R)	34	10	5	19	49	61	−12	35	Qualification to relegation play-offs
17	Quick '20 (R)	34	8	7	19	53	84	−31	31	Relegation to Hoofdklasse
18	HBS Craeyenhout (R)	34	7	7	20	37	62	−25	28	Relegation to Hoofdklasse

Source: Soccerway
Rules for classification: 1) points; 2) goal difference; 3) number of goals scored
(C) Champions; (P) Promoted; (R) Relegated

== Promotion/relegation play-offs Derde Divisie and Hoofdklasse ==
The numbers 15 and 16 of each of the 2018–19 Derde Divisies (2 times 2 teams) and the 3 (substitute) period winners of each of the 2018–19 Hoofdklassen (4 times 3 teams), making 16 teams, decide in a 3-round 2-leg knockout system, which 3 teams play next season in the 2019–20 Derde Divisie leagues. The remaining 13 teams play next season in the 2019–20 Hoofdklasse leagues. Contrary to previous seasons, the play-offs for Saturday and Sunday teams are not fully separated any more.

First round

The 4 Derde Divisie teams and the 4 highest ranked (substitute) period winners (HPWs) from the Hoofdklassen are released from playing the first round. Teams are paired in such a way that the 2 middle ranked (substitute) period winners (MPWs) from the Saturday Hoofdklassen play against the lowest ranked (substitute) period winners (LPWs) from the other Saturday Hoofdklasse. The same applies for the Sunday MPWs and LPWs. So at this stage there will be no matches yet between Saturday and Sunday teams. The lowest ranked teams (LPWs) will play the first match at home, and the highest ranked teams (MPWs) the second match.

Second round

In the second round there're still no matches between Saturday and Sunday teams. The following applies identical for the Saturday as well as Sunday teams. The highest ranked Derde Divisie team (H3D) will play against the winner of the match between the LPW of the A league against the MPW of the B league. The lowest ranked Derde Divisie team (L3D) will play against the HPW of the A league. The HPW of the B league will play against the winner of the match between the LPW of the B league against the MPW of the A league. The lowest ranked teams will play the first match at home, and the highest ranked teams the second match.

Finals

The first final is between the winners of the 2 matches in which the Derde Divisie Saturday teams play. The second final is between the winners of the 2 matches in which the Derde Divisie Sunday teams play. The consequence is that at least 1 Saturday and at least 1 Sunday Derde Divisie team will relegate. The third final is between the winners of the 2 remaining matches. This is the only play-offs match in which a Saturday and a Sunday team will face each other and for sure both teams will be Hoofdklasse period winners. Therefore, at least 1 Hoofdklasse team will promote.

=== Qualified Teams ===
Club	Qualification	Remark
Eemdijk	15th in the Derde Divisie Saturday	Released from playing the first round
SJC	16th in the Derde Divisie Saturday	Released from playing the first round
JVC Cuijk	15th in the Derde Divisie Sunday	Withdrew from the play-offs
OJC Rosmalen	16th in the Derde Divisie Sunday	Released from playing the first round
RKAV Volendam	Winner of the first period in the Hoofdklasse A Saturday (2nd)	Released from playing the first round
SC Feyenoord	Substitute winner of the third period in the Hoofdklasse A Saturday (3rd)	
Jodan Boys	Winner of the second period in the Hoofdklasse A Saturday (7th)	
Staphorst	Winner of the second period in the Hoofdklasse B Saturday (2nd)	Released from playing the first round
Sparta Nijkerk	Winner of the third period in the Hoofdklasse B Saturday (3rd)	
ACV	Winner of the first period in the Hoofdklasse B Saturday (5th)	
Hoogeveen	Winner of the first period in the Hoofdklasse A Sunday (2nd)	Released from playing the first round
SDO	Substitute winner of the third period in the Hoofdklasse A Sunday (3rd)	
Hoogland	Winner of the second period in the Hoofdklasse A Sunday (5th)	
Gemert	Substitute winner of the second period in the Hoofdklasse B Sunday (2nd)	Released from playing the first round
Halsteren	Substitute winner of the fictional third period in the Hoofdklasse B Sunday (3rd)	
Unitas	Winner of the first period in the Hoofdklasse B Sunday (5th)	

=== Results ===
First round
Jodan Boys	0	1	1
Sparta Nijkerk	2	2	4

Second round
Sparta Nijkerk	2	2	4
Eemdijk	0	1	1
SJC	0	2	2
RKAV Volendam	3	5	8

Final
Sparta Nijkerk	2	3	5
RKAV Volendam	1	1	2

First round
Unitas	2	0	2
SDO	2	2	4
ACV (pen.)	0	0	0
SC Feyenoord	1	2	3

Second round
SDO	0	0	0
Gemert	5	4	9
SC Feyenoord	0	0	0
Staphorst	3	4	7

Final
Gemert	2	2	4
Staphorst	1	1	2

First round
Hoogland	3	4	7
Halsteren	2	4	6

Second round
Hoogland
~~JVC Cuijk~~
OJC Rosmalen	2	3	5
Hoogeveen	0	1	1

Final
Hoogland	2	3	5
OJC Rosmalen	2	2	4

Sparta Nijkerk, Gemert and Hoogland promoted to the 2019-20 Derde Divisie.
Eemdijk, SJC, JVC Cuijk and OJC Rosmalen relegated to the 2019-20 Hoofdklasse.
The other teams remained in the 2019-20 Hoofdklasse.
