= Brahim Bouhadan =

Dutch footballer

Personal information
- Date of birth: 2 February 1983 (age 43)
- Place of birth: Roosendaal, Netherlands
- Height: 1.84 m (6 ft 0 in)
- Position: Forward

Youth career
- VES '35

Senior career*
Years	Team	Apps	(Gls)
2004–2006	AGOVV	65	(4)
2006–2007	Fortuna Sittard	26	(1)
2008	TOP Oss	9	(1)
2008–2010	Baronie		
- * Club domestic league appearances and goals

Brahim Bouhadan (born 2 February 1983) is a Dutch former professional footballer who played as a forward.

He left Fortuna Sittard for fellow Eerste Divisie side TOP Oss in 2008. He later played for amateur sides Unitas '30, GLZ Delfshaven and FC Jeugd.
