= Max van Herk =

Dutch footballer

Personal information
- Date of birth: 3 December 1998 (age 27)
- Place of birth: Ouderkerk aan den IJssel, Netherlands
- Height: 1.98 m (6 ft 6 in)
- Position: Goalkeeper

Team information
- Current team: Excelsior Maassluis

Youth career
- 2003–2018: VV Spirit
- 2020–2021: Dordrecht

Senior career*
Years	Team	Apps	(Gls)
2021–2022	Dordrecht	8	(0)
2023–2024	Ariana FC	17	(0)
2024–2025	TOP Oss	1	(0)
2025–2026	Zwaluwen	13	(0)
2026–	Excelsior Maassluis		
- * Club domestic league appearances and goals as of 6 December 2025

Max van Herk (born 3 December 1998) is a Dutch footballer who plays as a goalkeeper for Excelsior Maassluis.

== Club career ==
Van Herk began his career at local club VV Spirit, and spent 15 years there before moving to FC Dordrecht on a free transfer in January 2020. He made his full debut for the club a year later, in a 5–0 loss to Roda JC. He kept his first clean sheet in a 1–0 victory over Telstar.

On 1 July 2022, van Herk left FC Dordrecht after the expiration of his contract.

On 31 March 2023, van Herk joined Ariana FC in the Swedish third-tier Ettan.

On 31 January 2024, van Herk signed with TOP Oss in Eerste Divisie. After a year with Zwaluwen Vlaardingen, van Herk moved to Excelsior Maassluis for the 2026-27 season.
