= Noël de Graauw =

Dutch footballer

Personal information
- Date of birth: 28 June 1997 (age 29)
- Place of birth: Breda, Netherlands
- Height: 1.74 m (5 ft 8 1/2 in)
- Position: Midfielder

Team information
- Current team: Kruisland

Youth career
- WDS '19
- –2009: Willem II
- 2009–2016: NAC

Senior career*
Years	Team	Apps	(Gls)
2016–2019	RKC	9	(1)
2020–	Baronie		
2023–	Kruisland		
- * Club domestic league appearances and goals as of 27 May 2019

Noël de Graauw (born 28 June 1997) is a Dutch football player who plays for SC Kruisland.

== Club career ==
He made his Eerste Divisie debut for RKC Waalwijk on 18 August 2017 in a game against FC Emmen. After a disappointing spell in Greece, he joined amateur side Baronie in 2020, only to move to fellow amateurs SC Kruisland in 2023.
