= Noémi Boekel =

Dutch softball player (born 1984)

- Infielder
- Born: 8 March 1984 (age 41); Huizen, North Holland, Netherlands
- Bats: Right Throws: Right
Medals
Women's softball
Representing Netherlands
Women's Softball European Championship
Silver medal – second place	2007 Amsterdam	Team
Bronze medal – third place	2005 Prague	Team

Noémi Boekel (born 8 March 1984) is a Dutch former softball player who represented the Dutch national team in international competitions.

== Career ==
Boekel was born on 8 March 1984 in Huizen, Netherlands. She started playing softball when she was five years old in De Zuidvogels until 2001, when she transferred to Almere '90, where she played from 2002 to 2003. She also played for Amsterdam Pirates (2004) and Sparks Haarlem from 2005 until her retirement in 2010. She was a catcher and third baseman who batted and threw right-handed.

== International career ==
She competed for the Netherlands national team since 2004 and participated in the 2005 European Championship in Prague, where the Dutch team won the bronze medal, and in the 2007 European Championship in Amsterdam, winning the silver medal. In 2007 she won the Egbert van der Sluis Memorial Trophy for being the best Dutch under–23 international player.

She was selected as part of the Dutch team that participated in the softball tournament at the 2008 Summer Olympics in Beijing, where the Netherlands finished last with a 1–6 record. She played in six games, where she had 10 at bats, one hit and one run batted in.
