= D'Olde Veste '54 =

Dutch football club

d'Olde Veste '54
- Full name: Voetbalvereniging d'Olde Veste '54
- Founded: 8 December 1954; 70 years ago
- Ground: Steenwijk, Netherlands
- Chairman: Elbert Jan Hesse
- Manager: Steven Wuestenenk
- League: Vierde Divisie
- 2024–25: Vierde Divisie D, 7th of 16
- Website: oldeveste.com
colours

Voetbalvereniging d'Olde Veste '54 is a Dutch association football club from Steenwijk. It was founded on 24 November 1954.

== History ==
d'Olde Veste '54 was founded on 24 November 1954 in Steenwijk, the Netherlands, during a meeting of around 40 local football enthusiasts at Hotel Blok. The new Saturday football club was named after the historic Olde Veste fortress associated with the town. Dr. W. Kraak was appointed the club's first chairman, supported by a provisional board that included H.H. Nipperus, A. Kuiper, E. Tienkamp, L. Berends, P. ten Veen, and A. van Rosmalen. The club applied for affiliation with the Royal Dutch Football Association (KNVB) and began recruiting members. To distinguish itself from the existing club VV Steenwijker Boys, it adopted blue and yellow as its official colours and arranged to lease the former Steenwijker Boys pitch on Gagelsweg. By the end of December 1954, the club had secured the Gagelsweg field, allowing it to begin training and preparations for league participation.

In the 2000s, Olde Veste played mostly in the Derde Klasse and Tweede Klasse and in the 2010s exclusively in the Eerste Klasse. Since 2022 it plays for the first time in its history in the Vierde Divisie (when it secured promotion still known as Hoofdklasse). The promotion was the consequence of a section championship in the Eerste Klasse.

=== Head coach ===
- Willem Jan Talsma (–2022)
- Klaas Boersma (2022–)
