= DZC '68 =

Dutch football club

- Full name: Doetinchemse Zaterdag Club 1968
- Nickname(s): DZC
- Founded: May 1, 1968; 57 years ago
- Ground: Sportpark Zuid; Doetinchem
- League: Vierde Divisie (2024–25)

DZC '68 is an amateur football club based in Doetinchem, Netherlands. It was formed on 1 May 1968, and they play their home games at Sportpark Zuid. They play in yellow jerseys with blue shorts and blue socks.

DZC '68 has produced multiple players who have played professional football, including Luuk de Jong, Siem de Jong, Caner Cavlan, Remy Raterink and Cihan Yalcin. Scott Calderwood is a former manager. Siri Worm started her international career on DZC boys' teams.

== History ==
In 2008 DZC '68 played a match against Aberdeen, where the Scottish side beat DZC '68 5–0. At the time Jimmy Calderwood was manager of Aberdeen and Scott Calderwood was manager of DZC '68. In 2010 DZC '68 played its neighbors De Graafschap for the last time, losing 4–0.

In 2010, DZC was promoted to the Eerste Klasse. In 2012, it was relegated from the Eerste Klasse in Dutch amateur football.

The Women's Team played promoted in 2016 to the fourth division. From 2019 to 2020 it played in the third division. From 2020 to 2022 in the second-division.
