= Pieter Langedijk =

Dutch footballer

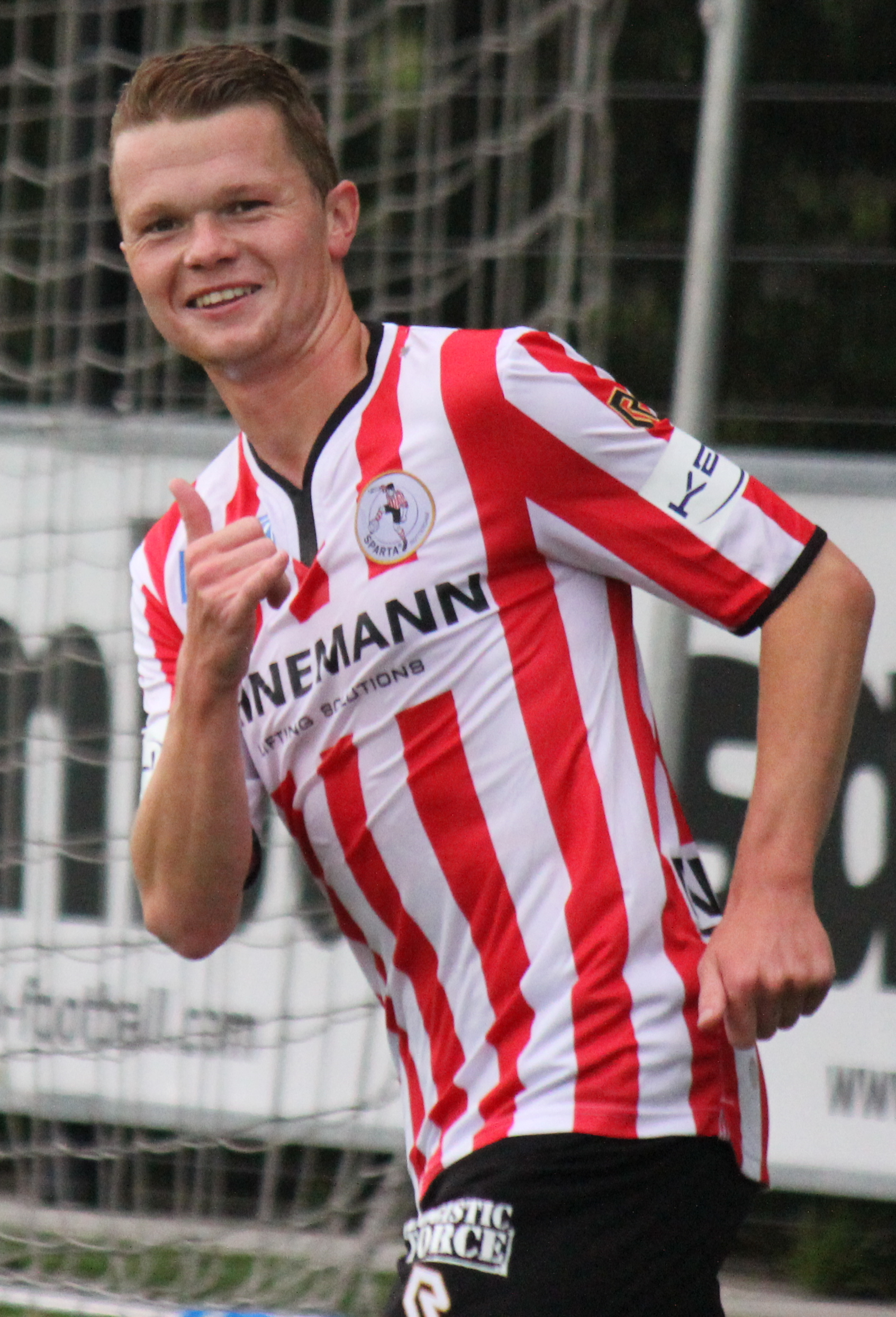
- Langedijk in 2015

Personal information
- Date of birth: 10 February 1994 (age 32)
- Place of birth: Maassluis, Netherlands
- Height: 1.80 m (5 ft 11 in)
- Position: Winger

Team information
- Current team: Zwaluwen
- Number: 15

Youth career
- Excelsior Maassluis
- Sparta Rotterdam

Senior career*
Years	Team	Apps	(Gls)
2013–2015	Sparta Rotterdam	33	(6)
2015–2017	RKC Waalwijk	53	(25)
2017–2019	Go Ahead Eagles	54	(6)
2019–2020	TOP Oss	15	(0)
2020–2021	FK Pardubice	2	(0)
2021–2022	IJsselmeervogels	23	(1)
2022–2025	Excelsior Maassluis	91	(28)
2025–	Zwaluwen		
- * Club domestic league appearances and goals as of 19 July 2025

Pieter Langedijk (born 10 February 1994) is a Dutch footballer who plays as a winger for Zwaluwen.

== Career ==
Langedijk started his career with Sparta Rotterdam.

On 9 June 2021, he returned to the Netherlands and agreed to join IJsselmeervogels.
