= HSV De Zuidvogels =

Dutch football club

De Zuidvogels
- Full name: Huizen Sport Vereniging De Zuidvogels
- Founded: 15 April 1928
- Ground: Sportpark De Wolfskamer, Huizen
- Manager: Juan Fernández Coto; Since 2016
- League: Eerste Klasse (2025–26)
- Website: https://www.hsvdezuidvogels.nl/
Home colours

Huizen Sport Vereniging De Zuidvogels is a football club from Huizen, Netherlands. Its first squad plays in the Eerste Klasse since 2001, with the exception of the 2017–18 and 2024–25 which were spent in the Hoofdklasse/Vierde Divisie.

== History ==
Zuidvogels was founded 15 April 1928 by a group of young people, all of whom were football fans. As there already was a soccer club in North Huizen, going by the name of Huizen (now SV Huizen), the youngsters named their South Huizen club Zuidvogels ("southern birds").

In 1952 the club was renamed HSV De Zuidvogels, which remains the official name. The club had grown to 400 members in 1962. In 1963 a new clubhouse was built by its own members, which has been extended and renovated over the years.

Due to the development of a new neighborhood, De Oostermeent, the number of residents of Huizen has almost doubled. This also increased the number of members of Zuidvogels. In 1972, a youth board was appointed to lead the rapid growth of the youth department. Paid trainers were hired, contributing to the relative strength of the youth. One of its former youth players, Nordin Amrabat, played in the 2018 FIFA World Cup on the Morocco national team.

In 1985 and 1998 Zuidvogels won section championships in the Derde Klasse. In 2001 it promoted to the Eerste Klasse from the third position of the Tweede Klasse. In 2017–18 the club played in the Saturday Hoofdklasse B. To succeed in its most senior league ever, it had acquired the forward Pieter Koopman from the Tweede Divisie-side VVSB. To no avail, as it relegated at the end of a single season back to the Eerste Klasse.

== Organization and fields ==
HSV De Zuidvogels has more than 70 teams and, in 2018, 1300 paying members. This makes it into the largest football club in Huizen and a major club in the Gooi region. With SV Huizen and Skiclub Wolfskamer, Zuidvogels play at Huizen sportpark Wolfskamer.

The accommodation of Zuidvogels consists of eight fields, of which three are grass, three artificial pitches, and two Cruyff Courts.

A baseball and softball club, BSV De Zuidvogels, has split from the soccer club. Noémi Boekel made it to the Netherlands women's national softball team after playing on BSV's youth.
