= VV De Meern =

Dutch football club

- Full name: Voetbalvereniging De Meern
- Founded: 18 June 1947
- Ground: Sportpark De Meern, De Meern
- League: Eerste Klasse Sunday B (2023–24)
- Website: vvdemeern.nl
Home colours

VV De Meern is a football club from De Meern, Netherlands. VV De Meern plays in the Sunday Hoofdklasse.

== History ==
In the 2018 De Meern relegated to the Hoofdklasse after just one season in the Derde Divisie. During the preparation for the 2018–019 season, it could barely beat Eerste Klasse-side Roda '46 2–1.
