= AVV Swift =

Association football club in Amsterdam, Netherlands

Swift
- Full name: Amsterdamse Voetbalvereniging Swift
- Founded: 1 February 1910; 116 years ago
- Ground: Olympiaplein, Amsterdam, Netherlands
- Capacity: 1,000
- Chairman: Marco Buursema
- Manager: Wilfred den Breejen
- League: Vierde Divisie
- 2024–25: Vierde Divisie A, 8th of 16
- Website: www.avvswift.nl
Home colours

Amsterdamse Voetbalvereniging Swift is a football club based in Amsterdam, Netherlands. They are currently members of the Vierde Divisie, the fifth tier of the Dutch football league system. They play their home matches at Sportpark Olympiaplein.

== History ==
Founded 1 February 1910, the name A.V.V. Swift stands for Amsterdamse Voetbalvereniging Swift (English: Amsterdam Football Club Swift). They play their home matches at Sportpark Olympiaplein in Amsterdam, which was built in 1927 ahead of the 1928 Summer Olympics, to a capacity of 1,000 people.

The Saturdays team of Swift were promoted to the Eerste Klasse, following their Tweede Klasse championship in the 2007–08 season. The following season saw Swift finishing in fourth place, thus qualifying for the playoffs for promotion to the Hoofdklasse which they won. They were relegated to the newly formed Topklasse in 2010–11, after their first season in the Hoofdklasse, finishing 13th, in second to last place on the table, resulting in relegation back to the Eerste Klasse.

In 2008 the teams Sportpark Olympiaplein was redesigned by Ruud-Jan Kokke, which earned the stadium a Dutch Design Award that same year.

The year the team was promoted to the Hoofdklasse in 2009, two new artificial grass fields were created at the Olympiaplein, as well as a new scoreboard put up. It is noteworthy to point out that AVV Swift's Sport park has very low sitting stands due to a historical law, which states that the view of the Monument Indië-Nederland from the Parnassusweg may never be obstructed, preventing the possibility of high seating in the park.

In 2017, Swift knocked out the defending KNVB Cup winners Vitesse in the first round on penalties.
