= SVA Papendorp =

Former Dutch football club

Coordinates: 52°4′7″N 5°5′8″E

- Badge used 2018–2020
- Full name: Sport Vereniging Atlas Papendorp
- Founded: 26 November 1990 (as Magreb '90)
- Dissolved: 7 February 2020
- Ground: Sportpark Papendorp, Utrecht, Netherlands
- Final season; 2019–20: 14th in Sunday Eerste Klasse A (membership terminated by KNVB)
Home colours

Sport Vereniging Atlas Papendorp, simply known as SVA Papendorp, was a Dutch football club based in Utrecht. Founded in 1990 as Magreb '90, the club played at Sportpark Papendorp, in the industry park of the same name.

== History ==
SVA Papendorp was founded as Magreb '90 on 26 November 1990 in the Leidsche Rijn district of Utrecht. The club initially served the Moroccan-Dutch community in the Kanaleneiland district and gained prominence in Dutch amateur football under the leadership of chairman Najim El Houati. By 2016, the club had reached the newly established Derde Divisie, but this period of success was marred by El Houati's arrest for drug trafficking that same year.

In August 2018, the club rebranded as SVA Papendorp and continued to play at Sportpark Papendorp, located in the industrial park of the same name. However, the club faced increasing challenges on and off the field. During the 2017–18 season, the first team, competing in the Derde Divisie Saturday pool after swapping places with Jong Vitesse, finished last and was relegated. The following season in the Hoofdklasse (Sunday B) was even more turbulent, with the team withdrawn from the league in November 2018 after failing to field a representative squad for multiple matches. Of the eight games played, the team recorded no wins, one draw, and seven losses, including defeats of 0–11 and 0–13.

In October 2019, the club faced further controversy when a referee and a game official were threatened during a match involving the second team. This incident prompted the Royal Dutch Football Association (KNVB) to suspend SVA Papendorp's participation in all competitions. Shortly thereafter, all eight teams associated with the club were withdrawn from competition. In February 2020, the KNVB formally terminated the club's membership, effectively dissolving it. The decision was upheld on appeal, with the court ruling the KNVB's actions were justified.

== Results ==
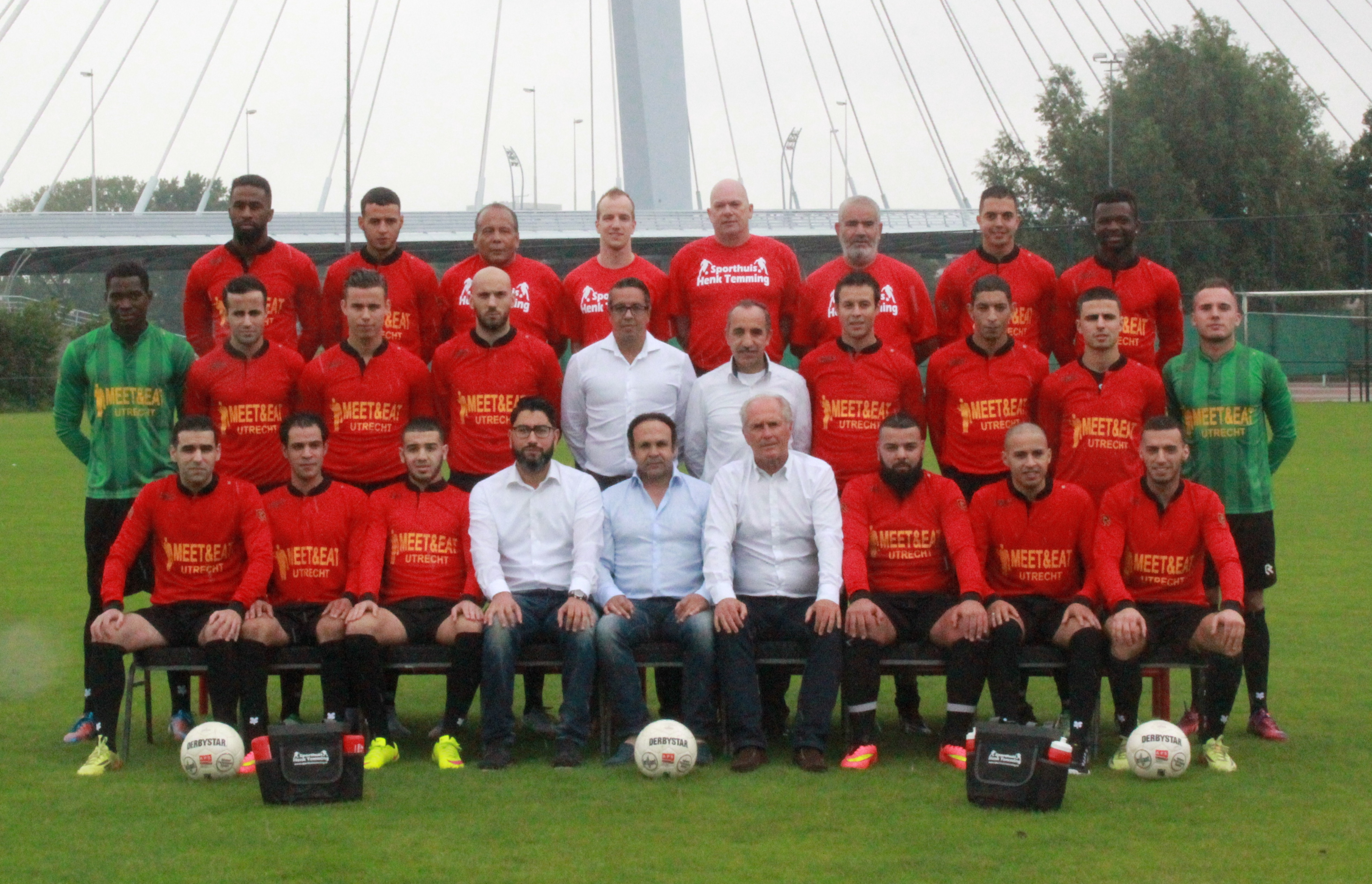
Magreb'90 ahead of the 2015–16 Topklasse season

=== Sunday team ===
11; 5A	10; 6A	10; 5H	6; 5H	4; 5H	2; 5H	10; 5G	4; 5G	10; 5G	1; 5G	1; 4G	1; 3D	1; 2B	8; 1B	1; 1B	1; A	13	14	18	xx B	xx 1A
00	01	02	03	04	05	06	07	08	09	10	11	12	13	14	15	16	17	18	19	20

Topklasse	Hoofdklasse	Eerste Klasse
Tweede Klasse	Derde Klasse	Vierde Klasse
Vijfde Klasse	Zesde Klasse

== Honours ==
- Hoofdklasse A (Sunday)
  - Champions (1): 2014–15
