= VV Baronie =

Dutch football club

- Full name: Voetbalvereniging Baronie
- Short name: VVB
- Founded: 1926; 100 years ago
- Ground: De Blauwe Kei; Breda
- Capacity: 7,000
- Chairman: Dick Schreuder
- Manager: Edin Curic
- League: Vierde Divisie
- 2024–25: Vierde Divisie C, 7th of 16
Home colours	Away colours

VV Baronie is a Dutch amateur association football club based in Breda.

== History ==
The club was founded on 4 July 1926 and has always been the second club of the city, being overshadowed by the far more successful NAC Breda. In 1955 the club entered into professional football in the Tweede Divisie, but failed to make a breakthrough in the local football fanbase, experiencing very low turnouts during those years. Such issues, coupled with a budget far lower than all other professional clubs, led the Dutch Football Federation to exclude Baronie from the league in 1971. Since then, Baronie has played at amateur level, winning six times the Hoofdklasse title. Baronie was part of the newly established Topklasse level in 2010–11 and has descended from that league after one season.
