= ONS Sneek =

Dutch football club

- Full name: Oranje Nassau Sneek
- Founded: 4 April 1932; 93 years ago
- Ground: Zuidersportpark; Sneek
- Capacity: 950
- League: Eerste Klasse North I (2023–24)
Home colours	Away colours

ONS Sneek is a Dutch football club from Sneek.

== Club history ==
=== 20th century: Foundation and move ===
Oranje Nassau Sneek was founded on 4 April 1932 and initially played its matches at the Sportpark Leeuwarderweg. In 1973, it moved to Zuidersportpark.

=== 21st century: Hoofdklasse and Derde Divisie ===
==== 2000s: Hoofdklasse years ====
In 2004 ONS became champions of the Eerste Klasse C in the Netherlands, and was promoted to the Zaterdag hoofdklasse C. After two years in the league, the club won the championship of that league on 22 April 2006, beating the Drachtster Boys in direct competition, after SC Genemuiden lost its final match of the season, and failed to secure three points to win the title. In May 2009 ONS Sneek was relegated to the Eerste Klasse, however it was promoted again after just one season, playing the 2011–12 season in the Dutch Hoofdklasse.

In 2008, the club started cooperation with the professional side SC Cambuur. Sandor van der Heide joined ONS from SC Cambuur and serves as assistant manager since 2010.

==== 2010s: Derde Divisie years ====
In 2012 the club terminated its working relationship with SC Cambuur, and entered a four-year partnership with Eredivisie club SC Heerenveen.

On 1 July 2012 the club changed its name to ONS BOSO Sneek, but it remained widely known as ONS Sneek. Before the start of the 2017–18 season, the club underwent a name change, dropping "BOSO" from its name due to securing a new sponsor.

On 25 September 2012, ONS Sneek qualified for the third round of the KNVB Cup, beating Excelsior from Rotterdam 5–4 on penalties, after the match ended in a 1–1 draw, facing Dutch giants AFC Ajax at home in the third round of the Dutch Cup.

== Players ==
=== National team players ===
The following players were called up to represent their national teams in international football and received caps during their tenure with ONS Sneek:

- (Netherlands) André Roosenburg (1947–1950; 1954–1955)

- Years in brackets indicate careerspan with ONS Sneek.
