= CSV Apeldoorn =

Dutch football club

- Full name: Christelijke Sportvereniging Apeldoorn
- Nickname: Rood-gelen
- Founded: 1 June 1946; 80 years ago
- Ground: Sportpark Orderbos; Apeldoorn
- Capacity: 2,500
- Coordinates: 52°12′08″N 5°55′20″E
- Chairman: Jan Veeneman
- Coach: Jan Kromkamp
- League: Vierde Divisie
- 2023–24: Saturday Eerste Klasse G (District East), 1st of 13 (promoted)
- Website: http://www.csvapeldoorn.nl
Home colours	Away colours

Christelijke Sportvereniging Apeldoorn is a Dutch association football club from Apeldoorn. They are currently members of the Vierde Divisie, the fifth tier of the Dutch football league system. The club was founded in 1946.

== History ==
In 2010 CSV Apeldoorn was promoted to the Topklasse by ranking third in the Hoofdklasse that year. It was relegated a year later back to the Hoofdklasse.

CSV Apeldoorn twice qualified for the main Dutch Cup. In season 2010–11, after receiving a bye in the first round CSV Apeldoorn lost 0–1 in the second round against VV Gemert. In season 2017-18 CSV Apeldoorn lost 2–4 in the first round against Willem II

== Honours ==
=== Championships ===
- Vierde Klasse: 1952, 1971, 1979
- Derde Klasse: 1993
- Tweede Klasse: 1997
- Eerste Klasse: 2002, 2009, 2022, 2024

=== Cup ===
- KNVB District Cup (East): 2017 (1 of 6 regional amateur cup competitions)

== League results ==
9	9	6; A	7; A	2; A	1; A	2	2	3	3	9	6; A	6; B	8; B	5	2	4; B	10; A	7; B	8; C	11; C	8; D	11; C	11; A	1; A	12; A	8; B	4; B	4; B	2; B	9; B	2; B	1; B	7; A	7; A	3; A	2; A	4; A	9; A	2; A	2; A	3; A	2; A	4; A	4; B	4; B	1; A	11; D	8; D	12; D	1; I	8; D	2; D	6; D	2; D	1; D	10; C	13; C	8; D	3; D	4; D	2; D	1; D	3; C	13	3; C	11; A	7; C	7; C	8; C	4; B	12; B	14; B	x D	x D	1; D	14; B	1; G
47	48	49	50	51	52	53	54	55	56	57	58	59	60	61	62	63	64	65	66	67	68	69	70	71	72	73	74	75	76	77	78	79	80	81	82	83	84	85	86	87	88	89	90	91	92	93	94	95	96	97	98	99	00	01	02	03	04	05	06	07	08	09	10	11	12	13	14	15	16	17	18	19	20	21	22	23	24

Derde Divisie (previously Topklasse)	Vierde Divisie (previously Hoofdklasse)	Eerste klasse	Tweede klasse	Derde klasse	Vierde klasse

x = seasons cancelled due to COVID-19

== Affiliation ==
CSV Apeldoorn was affiliated with Eredivisie-side PEC Zwolle. The purpose was to provide talented youth players optimal opportunities to develop.
In September 2022, the club switched this form of partnership to 2 different clubs who both play in the Eredivisie, namely Vitesse and Go Ahead Eagles.
