= RKSV Halsteren =

Dutch football club

- Full name: Rooms Katholieke SportVereniging Halsteren
- Founded: 1 April 1926
- Ground: Sportpark De Beek, Halsteren
- League: Vierde Divisie Sunday A (2022–23)
- Website: http://www.rksvhalsteren.nl/
Home colours

RKSV Halsteren is a football club from Halsteren, Netherlands. RKSV Halsteren plays in the 2022–23 Sunday Vierde Divisie B.

== History ==
In January 2020, RKSV Halsteren was exploring a merger with RBC Roosendaal that was at the brink of a second bankruptcy. RBC had some assets that are of interest towards Halsteren's possible promotion to the Derde Klasse. After already agreeing on a new name and colors, the clubs decided not to merge.

In the 2023–24 season, RKSV Halsteren qualified for the promotion playoffs.
