= VV Zwaluwen =

Association football club in Vlaardingen, Netherlands

- Full name: Voetbalvereniging Zwaluwen
- Founded: 5 September 1935; 90 years ago
- Ground: Zwaluwen, Vlaardingen
- Chairman: Lex Boers
- Manager: Luigi Bruins
- League: Derde Divisie
- 2024–25: Vierde Divisie B, 1st of 16 (promoted)
- Website: http://www.vvzwaluwen.nl/
Home colours	Away colours

Voetbalvereniging Zwaluwen Vlaardingen is a football club from Vlaardingen, Netherlands.

== History ==
The club was founded in 1935. The first squad promoted to the Derde Klasse in 1946. Since, Zwaluwen has been hovering between de Derde, Tweede, and Eerste Klasse. Zwaluwen won the national KNVB Amateur Cup in 1951.

In 2010, the first squad promoted to the Hoofdklasse, later renamed Vierde Divisie. In the 2021–22 season, Zwaluwen qualified for the promotion playoffs, where it lost 6–2 on aggregate to RKAV Volendam in the first round.

=== Managers ===
- 1947-1948: Jac van de Borden
- 1948-1950: Leen van der Lee
- 1950-1955: Max? Zalmé
- 1955-1957: Jan Molendijk
- 1957-1959: Kees den Haan
- 1959-1961: Janus van der Gijp
- 1961-1966: Wout Zuidgeest
- 1966-1967: Toob Remmers
- 1967-1970: Gidi Jacobs
- 1970-1974: Wim van Buuren
- 1974-1978: Frans de Kruis
- 1978-1980: Theo de Waard
- 1980-1981: André Corveleyn
- 1981-1984: Cor Nieuwenhuizen
- 1984: Ton van der Leije (interim)
- 1984-1986: Arnold Lobman
- 1986-1989: Jan van der Hoek
- 1989-1996: Danny Molendijk
- 1996-1999: Ron van den Berg
- 1999-2001: Roel den Hartog
- 2001-2008: Jan de Gier
- 2008-2010: Peter Wubben
- 2010-2011: Ron Timmers
- 2011-2013: Harry Akkermans
- 2013-2015: Adrie Poldervaart
- 2015-2016: Joop Hiele
- 2016-2018: Oscar Biesheuvel
- 2018-2019: Danny Schenkel
- 2019–2020: Ralph Kalkman
- 2020–2024: Henk de Zeeuw
- 2024–: Luigi Bruins
