= 2020–21 Eerste Klasse =

Eerste Klasse
- Season: 2020–21
- Champions: None
- Promoted: No promotion
- Relegated: No relegation

2020–21 Eerste Klasse was an Eerste Klasse season. The teams were near-identical to the 2019–20 Eerste Klasse season, after the COVID-19 pandemic in the Netherlands caused the KNVB to decide that there would be no relegation and promotion following the previous season. A few teams promoted anyway to the Hoofdklasse and Eerste Klasse.

The league commenced on 22 August 2020 for the Saturday sections and 23 August for the Sunday sections and were curtailed on 24 February 2021, when the KNVB discontinued category A senior competitions in this season, including Eerste Klasse, again without promotion or relegation.

== Saturday sections ==
Participating clubs were:

=== A: West I ===
- Amsterdamsche FC
- Argon
- BOL
- Die Haghe
- Forum Sport
- HEDW
- Honselersdijk
- Monnickendam
- Nootdorp
- VELO
- Valken '68
- Voorschoten '97
- ZOB
- Zwaluwen '30

=== B: West II ===
- Brielle
- BVCB
- Heerjansdam
- Heinenoord
- Kloetinge
- Neptunus-Schiebroek
- Nieuw-Lekkerland
- Nieuwenhoorn
- Oranje Wit
- Papendrecht
- RVVH
- SHO
- Terneuzense Boys
- XerxesDZB

=== C: South ===
- Almkerk
- De Bilt
- Breukelen
- GRC '14
- Huizen
- LRC
- Montfoort
- Nivo Sparta
- Roda '46
- Sliedrecht
- SVL
- WNC
- Woudenberg
- Zuidvogels

=== D: East ===
- Bennekom
- CSV Apeldoorn
- DFS
- DOS '37
- DOS Kampen
- Ede
- DZC '68
- Kampen
- Hierden
- KHC
- Nunspeet
- Barneveld
- SVI
- SVZW

=== E: North ===
- Balk
- Blauw Wit '34
- Broeksterwoude
- FC Burgum
- Drachten
- VV Groningen
- Leeuwarder Zwaluwen
- Olde Veste
- Oranje Nassau
- Pelikaan-S
- PKC '83
- WHC
- Winsum
- Zeerobben

== Sunday sections ==
Participating clubs were:

=== A: West I ===
- AFC '34
- AGB
- Assendelft
- DSOV
- Fortuna Wormerveer
- Hillegom
- Hoofddorp
- Kampong
- Kolping Boys
- Legmeervogels
- LSVV
- ROAC
- Uitgeest
- SDZ

=== B: West II ===
- Boshuizen
- DHC
- DOSKO
- Den Hoorn
- Hillegersberg
- Olympia
- ONA
- Rood Wit
- 't Zand
- Sarto
- Spartaan '20
- Unitas '30
- VUC
- Zwervers

=== C: South I ===
- Alverna
- Berghem
- Best
- Brabantia
- EFC
- FC Eindhoven AV
- Erp
- HVCH
- Leones
- SC NEC
- Nemelaer
- Rhode
- SV TOP
- Woezik

=== D: South II ===
- Chevremont
- Deurne
- Geldrop
- Heeze
- Limburgia
- SSS '18
- De Ster
- Venray
- Susteren
- Venlo
- Veritas
- Wilhelmina '08
- Wittenhorst
- ZSV

=== E: East ===
- De Bataven
- Bemmel
- BVC '12
- AVV Columbia
- SV Dalfsen
- Heino
- MASV
- RKHVV
- Raalte
- Stevo
- Tubantia
- TVC '28
- Voorwaarts Twello
- Winterswijk

=== F: North ===
- FVC
- Germanicus
- Gomos
- GRC Groningen
- VV Heerenveen
- Hoogezand
- Jubbega
- Noordster
- Roden
- Sneek Wit Zwart
- Stadspark
- SVBO
- VKW
- WVV 1896
