= 2018–19 Eerste Klasse =

Eerste Klasse
- Season: 2018–19

2018–19 Eerste Klasse was a Dutch Eerste Klasse association football season of the Eerste Klasse.

== Saturday sections ==
Participating clubs and champions were:

=== A: West I ===
- FC Aalsmeer
- Amsterdamsche FC
- SV ARC
- SV Argon
- CSV BOL
- FC Breukelen
- CSW
- DHSC Champion
- SV Huizen
- Roda '46
- HFC Victoria
- HEDW
- Zuidvogels
- Zwaluwen '30

=== B: West II ===
- VV Brielle
- BVCB
- Deltasport
- SV Die Haghe
- Forum Sport
- SV Heinenoord
- SV Honselersdijk
- VV Kloetinge
- De Meeuwen
- SV Poortugaal
- VV Rijsoord Champion
- RVVH
- VV SHO
- Westlandia

=== C: South ===
- VV Almkerk
- Geinoord
- GJS Gorinchem
- GRC '14
- VV Heerjansdam
- LRC Leerdam
- VV Montfoort
- VV Nieuw-Lekkerland
- SV Oranje Wit
- VV Sliedrecht
- Sportlust '46 Champion
- SVL
- VVGZ
- VV WNC

=== D: East ===
- VV Bennekom
- DOS '37
- ASV Dronten
- DTS Ede
- DZC '68
- Enter Vooruit
- Go-Ahead Kampen
- VV Hierden
- VV KHC
- De Merino's
- NSC Nijkerk Champion
- VV Nunspeet
- VV Scherpenzeel
- SDV Barneveld

=== E: North ===
- VV Balk
- Be Quick Dokkum
- SV Bedum
- Broekster Boys
- Drachtster Boys
- VV Gorecht
- VV Groningen
- HZVV Champion
- Noordscheschut
- Olde Veste
- Oranje Nassau Groningen
- PKC '83
- VV Winsum
- Zeerobben

== Sunday sections ==
Participating clubs and champions were:

=== A: West I ===
- AFC '34
- AGB
- FC Boshuizen
- DSOV
- SV Hillegom
- SV Hoofddorp
- JOS Watergraafsmeer
- Legmeervogels
- LSVV
- SV NVC
- FC Uitgeest
- RKVV Velsen Champion
- Zaanlandia
- AVV Zeeburgia

=== B: West II ===
- VV BMT
- SV Den Hoorn
- DHC Delft
- DOSKO
- GLZ Delfshaven
- VV Groeneweg
- Moerse Boys
- Olympia Gouda
- Rood Wit W
- Spartaan '20
- SV VELO
- VOC Champion
- VUC
- CVV Zwervers

=== C: South I ===
- RKVV Alverna
- RKVV Brabantia
- Best Vooruit
- HVCH
- Juliana '31 Champion
- SV Leones
- Nemelaer
- Oirschot Vooruit
- TOP Oss
- RKSV Prinses Irene
- RKSV Rhode
- FC Tilburg
- SC Woezik
- SC 't Zand

=== D: South II ===
- RKSV Bekkerveld
- VV Chevremont
- SV Deurne
- EHC Heuts Champion
- VV Geldrop
- RKSV Heeze
- De Valk
- SV Venray
- VV Schaesberg
- SC Susteren
- Venlosche Boys
- RKVV Veritas
- RKSV Wittenhorst
- ZSV

=== E: East ===
- BVC '12
- FC Winterswijk
- HVV Tubantia
- KSV BWO
- Longa '30 Champion
- RKSV De Zweef
- RKVV Stevo
- ROHDA Raalte
- SC Bemmel
- SC NEC
- TVC '28
- VV Heino
- VV Rigtersbleek
- WAVV

=== F: North ===
- BOSO Sneek
- FVC
- GAVC
- Gomos
- GRC Groningen
- Noordster
- SC Stadspark
- SVBO
- VKW
- VV Bergum
- VV Emmen Champion
- VV Heerenveen
- VV Nieuw Buinen
- WVV 1896
