= 2018–19 in Dutch football =

Football in Netherlands
- Season: 2018–19

Men's football
- Eredivisie: Ajax
- Eerste Divisie: Twente
- KNVB Cup: Ajax
- Johan Cruyff Shield: Feyenoord

The 2018–19 season is the 129th season of competitive football in the Netherlands.

== Promotion and relegation ==
=== Pre-season ===
League	Promoted to league	Relegated from league
Eredivisie	FC Emmen; Fortuna Sittard; De Graafschap	Sparta Rotterdam; FC Twente; Roda JC
Eerste Divisie	-	-
Tweede Divisie	Jong Almere City; Jong Vitesse; Scheveningen; SV Spakenburg	Lisse; SV TEC; ASV De Dijk; Achilles '29
Derde Divisie	SteDoCo; Noordwijk; Hoek; Eemdijk; Ajax (amateurs); SJC; Oss '20; GOES	Spijkenisse; Jong Twente; Capelle; Magreb '90; Be Quick 1887; Jong De Graafschap; ACV; De Meern

== League season ==
=== Eredivisie ===
Pos	Team	Pld	W	D	L	GF	GA	GD	Pts	Qualification or relegation
1	Ajax (C)	34	28	2	4	119	32	+87	86	Qualification for the Champions League third qualifying round
2	PSV Eindhoven	34	26	5	3	98	26	+72	83	Qualification for the Champions League second qualifying round
3	Feyenoord	34	20	5	9	75	41	+34	65	Qualification for the Europa League third qualifying round (Note: Since the winners of the 2018–19 KNVB Cup, Ajax, qualified for European competition based on league position, the spot awarded to the KNVB Cup winners (Europa League third qualifying round) was passed to the third-placed team and the spot awarded to the third-placed team (Europa League second qualifying round) was passed to the fourth-placed team.)
4	AZ	34	17	7	10	64	43	+21	58	Qualification for the Europa League second qualifying round
5	Vitesse	34	14	11	9	70	51	+19	53	Qualification for the European competition play-offs (Note: Four teams play for a spot in the 2019–20 UEFA Europa League second qualifying round.)
6	Utrecht (O)	34	15	8	11	60	51	+9	53	Qualification for the European competition play-offs
7	Heracles Almelo	34	15	3	16	61	68	−7	48	Qualification for the European competition play-offs
8	Groningen	34	13	6	15	39	41	−2	45	Qualification for the European competition play-offs
9	ADO Den Haag	34	12	9	13	58	63	−5	45	
10	Willem II	34	13	5	16	58	72	−14	44	
11	Heerenveen	34	10	11	13	64	73	−9	41	
12	VVV-Venlo	34	11	8	15	47	63	−16	41	
13	PEC Zwolle	34	11	6	17	44	57	−13	39	
14	Emmen	34	10	8	16	41	72	−31	38	
15	Fortuna Sittard	34	9	7	18	50	80	−30	34	
16	Excelsior (R)	34	9	6	19	46	79	−33	33	Qualification for the Relegation play-offs (Note: Ten teams, two from the Eredivisie and eight from the Eerste Divisie, play for two spots in the 2019–20 Eredivisie. The remaining eight teams play in the 2019–20 Eerste Divisie.)
17	De Graafschap (R)	34	8	5	21	38	75	−37	29	Qualification for the Relegation play-offs
18	NAC Breda (R)	34	5	8	21	29	74	−45	23	Relegation to Eerste Divisie

Source: eredivisie.nl
Rules for classification: Season in progress: 1) Most points won; 2) Less points lost; 3) Goal difference; 4) Goals scored; 5) Alphabetical order; End of season: 1) Points; 2) Goal difference; 3) Goals scored; 4) Head-to-head points; 5) Head-to-head goal difference; 6) Head-to-head away goals scored; 7) Play-off if relevant for deciding champion, relegation or participating in a European league, otherwise by draw. 8) Penalty shoot-out (only after a play-off)
(C) Champions; (O) Play-off winners; (R) Relegated
Notes:

Ten teams, two from the Eredivisie and eight from the Eerste Divisie, played for two spots in the 2019–20 Eredivisie, the remaining eight teams playing in the 2019–20 Eerste Divisie.

First round
NEC	2	0	2
RKC Waalwijk	0	3	3
SC Cambuur	2	2	4
Almere City	2	1	3

Second round
RKC Waalwijk	2	1	3
Excelsior	1	1	2
Go Ahead Eagles	2	1	3
FC Den Bosch	2	0	2
TOP Oss	0	0	0
Sparta Rotterdam	2	3	5
SC Cambuur	1	0	1
De Graafschap	1	2	3

Third round
RKC Waalwijk*	0	5	5
Go Ahead Eagles	0	4	4
Sparta Rotterdam*	1	2	3
De Graafschap	2	0	2

Key: * = Play-off winners, (a) = Wins because of away goals rule, (e) = Wins after extra time in second leg, (p) = Wins after penalty shoot-out.

=== Eerste Divisie ===
Pos	Team	Pld	W	D	L	GF	GA	GD	Pts	Promotion or qualification
1	Twente (Note: Twente were deducted 1 point and winner of the Third Period (games 21–29).) (C, P)	38	25	5	8	72	39	+33	79	Promotion to the Eredivisie
2	Sparta Rotterdam (Note: Winner of the First Period (games 3–11).) (O, P)	38	19	12	7	78	47	+31	69	Qualification to promotion play-offs second round
3	Jong PSV (Note: Reserves teams aren't eligible to be promoted to the Eredivisie)	38	18	9	11	77	59	+18	63	
4	Den Bosch (Note: Winner of the Second Period (games 12–20).)	38	18	9	11	64	49	+15	63	Qualification to promotion play-offs second round
5	Go Ahead Eagles	38	19	6	13	63	57	+6	63	Qualification to promotion play-offs second round
6	TOP Oss	38	18	8	12	48	40	+8	62	Qualification to promotion play-offs second round
7	Almere City (Note: Winner of the Fourth Period (games 30–38).)	38	19	5	14	60	63	−3	62	Qualification to promotion play-offs first round
8	RKC Waalwijk (O, P)	38	18	5	15	69	57	+12	59	Qualification to promotion play-offs first round
9	NEC	38	16	10	12	73	60	+13	58	Qualification to promotion play-offs first round
10	Cambuur	38	16	10	12	61	48	+13	58	Qualification to promotion play-offs first round
11	Jong Ajax	38	16	8	14	81	67	+14	56	
12	MVV	38	14	12	12	49	53	−4	54	
13	Roda JC Kerkrade	38	14	11	13	57	59	−2	53	
14	Eindhoven	38	13	9	16	52	48	+4	48	
15	Telstar	38	14	6	18	45	58	−13	48	
16	Volendam	38	9	14	15	46	62	−16	41	
17	Dordrecht	38	9	9	20	54	84	−30	36	
18	Jong AZ	38	7	12	19	46	67	−21	33	
19	Jong Utrecht	38	5	8	25	47	90	−43	23	
20	Helmond Sport	38	4	10	24	37	72	−35	22	

Source: Soccerway, Keuken Kampioen Divisie (in Dutch)
Rules for classification: Season in progress: 1) Most points won; 2) Less points lost; 3) Goal difference; 4) Goals scored; 5) Alphabetical order. End of season: 1) Points; 2) Goal difference; 3) Goals scored; 4) Head-to-head points; 5) Head-to-head goal difference; 6) Head-to-head away goals scored; 7) Play-off if relevant for deciding champion, relegation, international competitions and play-offs qualification, otherwise by draw. 8) Penalty shoot-out (only after a play-off)
(C) Champions; (O) Play-off winners; (P) Promoted

=== Tweede Divisie ===
Pos	Team	Pld	W	D	L	GF	GA	GD	Pts	Promotion, qualification or relegation
1	AFC (C)	34	22	5	7	85	43	+42	71	Champion
2	Excelsior Maassluis	34	19	6	9	69	38	+31	63	
3	IJsselmeervogels	34	19	6	9	70	52	+18	63	
4	Koninklijke HFC	34	18	7	9	62	37	+25	61	
5	Katwijk	34	15	10	9	51	39	+12	55	
6	HHC Hardenberg	34	16	6	12	68	54	+14	54	
7	Kozakken Boys	34	16	6	12	59	49	+10	54	
8	Jong Vitesse	34	15	8	11	62	46	+16	53	
9	SV Spakenburg	34	16	4	14	55	52	+3	52	
10	GVVV	34	14	7	13	61	64	−3	49	
11	De Treffers	34	14	6	14	47	48	−1	48	
12	Jong Sparta	34	13	8	13	59	54	+5	47	
13	Rijnsburgse Boys	34	14	5	15	77	79	−2	47	
14	Scheveningen	34	12	7	15	59	65	−6	43	
15	VVSB (R)	34	8	6	20	57	82	−25	30	Qualification to relegation play-offs
16	Jong Almere City (R)	34	8	4	22	46	69	−23	28	Relegation to Derde Divisie
17	Lienden (R)	34	7	5	22	42	95	−53	26	Qualification to relegation play-offs
18	Barendrecht (R)	34	5	4	25	29	92	−63	19	Relegation to Derde Divisie

Updated to match(es) played on 25 May 2019. Source: Soccerway
Rules for classification: 1) points; 2) goal difference; 3) number of goals scored
(C) Champions; (R) Relegated

=== Derde Divisie ===
==== Saturday League ====
Pos	Team	Pld	W	D	L	GF	GA	GD	Pts	Promotion, qualification or relegation
1	Noordwijk (Note: Winner of the first period (games 1-12).) (C, P)	34	25	5	4	94	41	+53	80	Promotion to Tweede Divisie
2	Quick Boys (Note: Substitute winner of the first period (games 1-12).) (O, P)	34	22	6	6	84	40	+44	72	Qualification to promotion play-offs
3	DVS '33	34	21	5	8	102	47	+55	68	
4	Hoek (Note: Winner of the second period (games 13-23).)	34	19	7	8	82	55	+27	64	Qualification to promotion play-offs
5	Jong Groningen	34	17	7	10	66	39	+27	58	
6	Harkemase Boys	34	17	6	11	68	59	+9	57	
7	ASWH (Note: Winner of the third period (games 24-34).) (O, P)	34	16	7	11	74	54	+20	55	Qualification to promotion play-offs
8	SteDoCo	34	17	4	13	65	56	+9	55	
9	ODIN '59	34	17	3	14	71	66	+5	54	
10	Lisse	34	16	3	15	62	64	−2	51	
11	DOVO	34	14	6	14	76	66	+10	48	
12	Ajax (amateurs)	34	12	5	17	52	61	−9	41	
13	ONS Sneek	34	12	3	19	57	58	−1	39	
14	VVOG	34	9	8	17	41	72	−31	35	
15	Eemdijk (R)	34	9	2	23	51	87	−36	29	Qualification to relegation play-offs
16	SJC (R)	34	8	2	24	50	105	−55	26	Qualification to relegation play-offs
17	ASV De Dijk (R)	34	4	7	23	49	111	−62	19	Relegation to Hoofdklasse
18	Achilles '29 (Note: On 8 April 2019 Achilles '29 were deducted one point for not meeting the requirements regarding the annual financial reports. On 2 May 2019 they were deducted an additional three points for still not meeting the same requirement.) (R)	34	4	8	22	44	107	−63	16	Relegation to Hoofdklasse

Source: Soccerway
Rules for classification: 1) points; 2) goal difference; 3) number of goals scored
(C) Champions; (O) Play-off winners; (P) Promoted; (R) Relegated
Notes:

The numbers 15 and 16 of each of the 2018–19 Derde Divisies (2 times 2 teams) and the 3 (substitute) period winners of each of the 2018–19 Hoofdklassen (4 times 3 teams), making 16 teams, decide in a 3-round 2-leg knockout system, which 3 teams play next season in the 2019–20 Derde Divisie leagues. The remaining 13 teams play next season in the 2019–20 Hoofdklasse leagues. Contrary to previous seasons, the play-offs for Saturday and Sunday teams are not fully separated any more.

First round

The 4 Derde Divisie teams and the 4 highest ranked (substitute) period winners (HPWs) from the Hoofdklassen are released from playing the first round. Teams are paired in such a way that the 2 middle ranked (substitute) period winners (MPWs) from the Saturday Hoofdklassen play against the lowest ranked (substitute) period winners (LPWs) from the other Saturday Hoofdklasse. The same applies for the Sunday MPWs and LPWs. So at this stage there will be no matches yet between Saturday and Sunday teams. The lowest ranked teams (LPWs) will play the first match at home, and the highest ranked teams (MPWs) the second match.

Second round

In the second round there're still no matches between Saturday and Sunday teams. The following applies identical for the Saturday as well as Sunday teams. The highest ranked Derde Divisie team (H3D) will play against the winner of the match between the LPW of the A league against the MPW of the B league. The lowest ranked Derde Divisie team (L3D) will play against the HPW of the A league. The HPW of the B league will play against the winner of the match between the LPW of the B league against the MPW of the A league. The lowest ranked teams will play the first match at home, and the highest ranked teams the second match.

Finals

The first final is between the winners of the 2 matches in which the Derde Divisie Saturday teams play. The second final is between the winners of the 2 matches in which the Derde Divisie Sunday teams play. The consequence is that at least 1 Saturday and at least 1 Sunday Derde Divisie team will relegate. The third final is between the winners of the 2 remaining matches. This is the only play-offs match in which a Saturday and a Sunday team will face each other and for sure both teams will be Hoofdklasse period winners. Therefore, at least 1 Hoofdklasse team will promote.

=== Qualified Teams ===
Club	Qualification	Remark
Eemdijk	15th in the Derde Divisie Saturday	Released from playing the first round
SJC	16th in the Derde Divisie Saturday	Released from playing the first round
JVC Cuijk	15th in the Derde Divisie Sunday	Withdrew from the play-offs
OJC Rosmalen	16th in the Derde Divisie Sunday	Released from playing the first round
RKAV Volendam	Winner of the first period in the Hoofdklasse A Saturday (2nd)	Released from playing the first round
SC Feyenoord	Substitute winner of the third period in the Hoofdklasse A Saturday (3rd)	
Jodan Boys	Winner of the second period in the Hoofdklasse A Saturday (7th)	
Staphorst	Winner of the second period in the Hoofdklasse B Saturday (2nd)	Released from playing the first round
Sparta Nijkerk	Winner of the third period in the Hoofdklasse B Saturday (3rd)	
ACV	Winner of the first period in the Hoofdklasse B Saturday (5th)	
Hoogeveen	Winner of the first period in the Hoofdklasse A Sunday (2nd)	Released from playing the first round
SDO	Substitute winner of the third period in the Hoofdklasse A Sunday (3rd)	
Hoogland	Winner of the second period in the Hoofdklasse A Sunday (5th)	
Gemert	Substitute winner of the second period in the Hoofdklasse B Sunday (2nd)	Released from playing the first round
Halsteren	Substitute winner of the fictional third period in the Hoofdklasse B Sunday (3rd)	
Unitas	Winner of the first period in the Hoofdklasse B Sunday (5th)	

=== Results ===
First round
Jodan Boys	0	1	1
Sparta Nijkerk	2	2	4

Second round
Sparta Nijkerk	2	2	4
Eemdijk	0	1	1
SJC	0	2	2
RKAV Volendam	3	5	8

Final
Sparta Nijkerk	2	3	5
RKAV Volendam	1	1	2

First round
Unitas	2	0	2
SDO	2	2	4
ACV (pen.)	0	0	0
SC Feyenoord	1	2	3

Second round
SDO	0	0	0
Gemert	5	4	9
SC Feyenoord	0	0	0
Staphorst	3	4	7

Final
Gemert	2	2	4
Staphorst	1	1	2

First round
Hoogland	3	4	7
Halsteren	2	4	6

Second round
Hoogland
~~JVC Cuijk~~
OJC Rosmalen	2	3	5
Hoogeveen	0	1	1

Final
Hoogland	2	3	5
OJC Rosmalen	2	2	4

Sparta Nijkerk, Gemert and Hoogland promoted to the 2019-20 Derde Divisie.
Eemdijk, SJC, JVC Cuijk and OJC Rosmalen relegated to the 2019-20 Hoofdklasse.
The other teams remained in the 2019-20 Hoofdklasse.

==== Sunday League ====
Pos	Team	Pld	W	D	L	GF	GA	GD	Pts	Promotion, qualification or relegation
1	Jong Volendam (C, P)	34	22	5	7	97	44	+53	71	Promotion to Tweede Divisie
2	TEC (Note: Winner of the first period (games 1-12).) (P)	34	21	7	6	63	38	+25	70	Promotion to Tweede Divisie
3	OFC (Note: Substitute winner of the first period (games 1-12).)	34	18	8	8	79	43	+36	62	Qualification to promotion play-offs
4	GOES (Note: Winner of the third period (games 24-34).)	34	20	1	13	80	55	+25	61	Qualification to promotion play-offs
5	UNA	34	17	5	12	68	55	+13	56	
6	OSS '20 (Note: Winner of the second period (games 13-23).)	34	16	6	12	70	53	+17	54	Qualification to promotion play-offs
7	Quick (H)	34	15	5	14	67	66	+1	50	
8	ADO '20	34	13	8	13	59	57	+2	47	
9	Westlandia	34	14	4	16	59	73	−14	46	
10	Dongen	34	14	3	17	51	70	−19	45	
11	USV Hercules	34	12	8	14	55	63	−8	44	
12	HSC '21	34	14	2	18	51	73	−22	44	
13	Blauw Geel '38	34	12	7	15	62	65	−3	43	
14	EVV (Note: EVV were deducted one point for no certified youth training and/or not having the required number of registered contract players.)	34	11	9	14	39	43	−4	41	
15	JVC Cuijk (R)	34	12	3	19	43	77	−34	39	Qualification to relegation play-offs
16	OJC Rosmalen (R)	34	10	5	19	49	61	−12	35	Qualification to relegation play-offs
17	Quick '20 (R)	34	8	7	19	53	84	−31	31	Relegation to Hoofdklasse
18	HBS Craeyenhout (R)	34	7	7	20	37	62	−25	28	Relegation to Hoofdklasse

Source: Soccerway
Rules for classification: 1) points; 2) goal difference; 3) number of goals scored
(C) Champions; (P) Promoted; (R) Relegated
Notes:

The numbers 15 and 16 of each of the 2018–19 Derde Divisies (2 times 2 teams) and the 3 (substitute) period winners of each of the 2018–19 Hoofdklassen (4 times 3 teams), making 16 teams, decide in a 3-round 2-leg knockout system, which 3 teams play next season in the 2019–20 Derde Divisie leagues. The remaining 13 teams play next season in the 2019–20 Hoofdklasse leagues. Contrary to previous seasons, the play-offs for Saturday and Sunday teams are not fully separated any more.

First round

The 4 Derde Divisie teams and the 4 highest ranked (substitute) period winners (HPWs) from the Hoofdklassen are released from playing the first round. Teams are paired in such a way that the 2 middle ranked (substitute) period winners (MPWs) from the Saturday Hoofdklassen play against the lowest ranked (substitute) period winners (LPWs) from the other Saturday Hoofdklasse. The same applies for the Sunday MPWs and LPWs. So at this stage there will be no matches yet between Saturday and Sunday teams. The lowest ranked teams (LPWs) will play the first match at home, and the highest ranked teams (MPWs) the second match.

Second round

In the second round there're still no matches between Saturday and Sunday teams. The following applies identical for the Saturday as well as Sunday teams. The highest ranked Derde Divisie team (H3D) will play against the winner of the match between the LPW of the A league against the MPW of the B league. The lowest ranked Derde Divisie team (L3D) will play against the HPW of the A league. The HPW of the B league will play against the winner of the match between the LPW of the B league against the MPW of the A league. The lowest ranked teams will play the first match at home, and the highest ranked teams the second match.

Finals

The first final is between the winners of the 2 matches in which the Derde Divisie Saturday teams play. The second final is between the winners of the 2 matches in which the Derde Divisie Sunday teams play. The consequence is that at least 1 Saturday and at least 1 Sunday Derde Divisie team will relegate. The third final is between the winners of the 2 remaining matches. This is the only play-offs match in which a Saturday and a Sunday team will face each other and for sure both teams will be Hoofdklasse period winners. Therefore, at least 1 Hoofdklasse team will promote.

=== Qualified Teams ===
Club	Qualification	Remark
Eemdijk	15th in the Derde Divisie Saturday	Released from playing the first round
SJC	16th in the Derde Divisie Saturday	Released from playing the first round
JVC Cuijk	15th in the Derde Divisie Sunday	Withdrew from the play-offs
OJC Rosmalen	16th in the Derde Divisie Sunday	Released from playing the first round
RKAV Volendam	Winner of the first period in the Hoofdklasse A Saturday (2nd)	Released from playing the first round
SC Feyenoord	Substitute winner of the third period in the Hoofdklasse A Saturday (3rd)	
Jodan Boys	Winner of the second period in the Hoofdklasse A Saturday (7th)	
Staphorst	Winner of the second period in the Hoofdklasse B Saturday (2nd)	Released from playing the first round
Sparta Nijkerk	Winner of the third period in the Hoofdklasse B Saturday (3rd)	
ACV	Winner of the first period in the Hoofdklasse B Saturday (5th)	
Hoogeveen	Winner of the first period in the Hoofdklasse A Sunday (2nd)	Released from playing the first round
SDO	Substitute winner of the third period in the Hoofdklasse A Sunday (3rd)	
Hoogland	Winner of the second period in the Hoofdklasse A Sunday (5th)	
Gemert	Substitute winner of the second period in the Hoofdklasse B Sunday (2nd)	Released from playing the first round
Halsteren	Substitute winner of the fictional third period in the Hoofdklasse B Sunday (3rd)	
Unitas	Winner of the first period in the Hoofdklasse B Sunday (5th)	

=== Results ===
First round
Jodan Boys	0	1	1
Sparta Nijkerk	2	2	4

Second round
Sparta Nijkerk	2	2	4
Eemdijk	0	1	1
SJC	0	2	2
RKAV Volendam	3	5	8

Final
Sparta Nijkerk	2	3	5
RKAV Volendam	1	1	2

First round
Unitas	2	0	2
SDO	2	2	4
ACV (pen.)	0	0	0
SC Feyenoord	1	2	3

Second round
SDO	0	0	0
Gemert	5	4	9
SC Feyenoord	0	0	0
Staphorst	3	4	7

Final
Gemert	2	2	4
Staphorst	1	1	2

First round
Hoogland	3	4	7
Halsteren	2	4	6

Second round
Hoogland
~~JVC Cuijk~~
OJC Rosmalen	2	3	5
Hoogeveen	0	1	1

Final
Hoogland	2	3	5
OJC Rosmalen	2	2	4

Sparta Nijkerk, Gemert and Hoogland promoted to the 2019-20 Derde Divisie.
Eemdijk, SJC, JVC Cuijk and OJC Rosmalen relegated to the 2019-20 Hoofdklasse.
The other teams remained in the 2019-20 Hoofdklasse.

=== Hoofdklasse ===
==== Saturday A League ====
Pos	Team	Pld	W	D	L	GF	GA	GD	Pts	Promotion, qualification or relegation
1	Ter Leede (Note: Winner of the third period (games 21-30).) (C, P)	30	21	4	5	62	31	+31	67	Promotion to 2019–20 Derde Divisie Saturday
2	RKAV Volendam (Note: Winner of the first period (games 1-10).)	30	19	4	7	84	46	+38	61	Qualification for 2019–20 Derde Divisie play-offs
3	SC Feyenoord (Note: Substitute winner of the third period (games 21-30).)	30	14	12	4	67	52	+15	54	Qualification for 2019–20 Derde Divisie play-offs
4	Zwaluwen	30	14	8	8	50	39	+11	50	
5	Jong Den Bosch	30	14	5	11	65	47	+18	47	
6	Rijnvogels	30	14	4	12	53	44	+9	46	
7	Jodan Boys (Note: Winner of the second period (games 11-20).)	30	13	7	10	52	46	+6	46	Qualification for 2019–20 Derde Divisie play-offs
8	's-Gravenzande	30	13	5	12	57	54	+3	44	
9	Smitshoek	30	11	8	11	46	48	−2	41	
10	Swift	30	10	9	11	58	52	+6	39	
11	Achilles Veen	30	11	6	13	50	45	+5	39	
12	Capelle	30	11	6	13	44	52	−8	39	
13	Spijkenisse (O)	30	10	7	13	50	58	−8	37	Qualification to relegation play-offs
14	Nootdorp (R)	30	6	5	19	32	65	−33	23	Qualification to relegation play-offs
15	DFS (R)	30	6	6	18	38	70	−32	21	Relegation to 2019–20 Eerste Klasse
16	XerxesDZB (R)	30	3	4	23	33	92	−59	13	Relegation to 2019–20 Eerste Klasse

Source: Soccerway
Rules for classification: 1) points; 2) goal difference; 3) number of goals scored
(C) Champions; (O) Play-off winners; (P) Promoted; (R) Relegated

=== Saturday ===
The numbers 13 and 14 from each of the 2018–19 Hoofdklasse Saturday leagues (2 times 2 teams) and 3 (substitute) period winners of each of the 2018–19 Eerste Klasse Saturday leagues (5 times 3 teams), making 19 teams, decide in a 3-round single match knockout system, which 3 teams play next season in the 2019–20 Hoofdklasse Saturday leagues. The remaining 16 teams play next season in the 2019–20 Eerste Klasse Saturday leagues.

First round

The 2 highest ranked Hoofdklasse teams (numbers 13) are released from playing the first round. Out of the 2 lowest ranked Hoofdklasse teams (numbers 14) and the 5 highest ranked (substitute) period winners (HPWs), 3 more teams are by draw released from playing the first round. The remaining 14 teams are paired by draw in such a way that, a HK or HPW team will always play a lowest ranked (substitute) period winner (LPW), and the highest ranked team gets the home advantage. The ranking order is HPW, HK, middle ranked (substitute) period winner (MPW) and LPW teams. If 2 equally ranked teams face each other, the order in which the 2 teams are drawn decides on the home advantage.

Second round

The 7 winners of the first round and the 5 teams released from playing the first round, making 12 teams, are paired by draw. The highest ranked team gets the home advantage. The ranking order is identical as in the first round.

Finals

The 6 winners of the second round are paired by draw. Matches are played on neutral ground and the 3 winners play next season in the 2019–20 Hoofdklasse Saturday leagues.

==== Qualified Teams ====
Club	Qualification	Remark
Spijkenisse	13th in the Hoofdklasse A Saturday	Released from playing the first round
Nootdorp	14th in the Hoofdklasse A Saturday	Released by draw from playing the first round
DETO Twenterand	13th in the Hoofdklasse B Saturday	Released from playing the first round
CSV Apeldoorn	14th in the Hoofdklasse B Saturday	
ARC	Winner of the third period in the Eerste Klasse A Saturday (2nd)	
AFC	Substitute winner of the second period in the Eerste Klasse A Saturday (3rd)	
Roda '46	Winner of the first period in the Eerste Klasse A Saturday (8th)	
Kloetinge	Winner of the second period in the Eerste Klasse B Saturday (2nd)	Released by draw from playing the first round
SHO	Winner of the first period in the Eerste Klasse B Saturday (3rd)	
Honselersdijk	Substitute winner of the third period in the Eerste Klasse B Saturday (4th)	
Sliedrecht	Winner of the first period in the Eerste Klasse C Saturday (2nd)	
Heerjansdam	Substitute winner of the second period in the Eerste Klasse C Saturday (3rd)	
GRC '14	Winner of the third period in the Eerste Klasse C Saturday (11th)	
Bennekom	Winner of the third period in the Eerste Klasse D Saturday (2nd)	Released by draw from playing the first round
Go-Ahead Kampen	Substitute winner of the first period in the Eerste Klasse D Saturday (3rd)	
DTS Ede	Winner of the second period in the Eerste Klasse D Saturday (5th)	
Oranje Nassau Groningen	Winner of the second period in the Eerste Klasse E Saturday (2nd)	
Winsum	Substitute winner of the first period in the Eerste Klasse E Saturday (3rd)	
Noordscheschut	Winner of the third period in the Eerste Klasse E Saturday (4th)	

==== Results ====
First round
1 juni 2019
Sliedrecht	4
Honselersdijk	1
1 juni 2019
CSV Apeldoorn	0
Roda '46	1

Second round
8 juni 2019
Kloetinge	1
DETO Twenterand (a.e.t.)	3
11 juni 2019
Sliedrecht	5
Roda '46	2

Final
15 juni 2019
DETO Twenterand (a.e.t.)	3
Sliedrecht	1

First round
1 juni 2019
Oranje Nassau Groningen	1
DTS Ede	5
1 juni 2019
ARC	2
GRC '14	1
1 juni 2019
SHO	2
Heerjansdam	1

Second round
8 juni 2019
Nootdorp	0
DTS Ede	4
8 juni 2019
ARC	4
SHO	1

Final
15 juni 2019
DTS Ede	3 (3)
ARC	3 (5)

First round
1 juni 2019
Winsum	1 (3)
Noordscheschut (pen.)	1 (4)
1 juni 2019
Go-Ahead Kampen	6
AFC	2

Second round
8 juni 2019
Spijkenisse	3
Noordscheschut	0
8 juni 2019
Bennekom	0
Go-Ahead Kampen	3

Final
15 juni 2019
Spijkenisse (pen.)	1 (4)
Go-Ahead Kampen	1 (1)

ARC promoted to the 2019-20 Hoofdklasse Saturday.
Spijkenisse and DETO Twenterand maintained in the 2019-20 Hoofdklasse Saturday.
CSV Apeldoorn and Nootdorp relegated to the 2019-20 Eerste Klasse Saturday.
The other teams remained in the 2019-20 Eerste Klasse Saturday.

=== Sunday ===
The numbers 13 and 14 from each of the 2018–19 Hoofdklasse Sunday leagues (2 times 2 teams) and 3 (substitute) period winners of each of the 2018–19 Eerste Klasse Sunday leagues (6 times 3 teams), making 22 teams, decide in a 4-round single match knockout system, which 2 teams play next season in the 2019–20 Hoofdklasse Sunday leagues. The remaining 20 teams play next season in the 2019–20 Eerste Klasse Sunday leagues.

First round

The Hoofdklasse teams and 6 highest ranked (substitute) period winners (HPWs) are released from playing the first round. The 12 remaining (substitute) period winners are paired by draw in such a way that, a middle (substitute) period winner (MPW) will always play a lowest ranked (substitute) period winner (LPW). The MPW teams also get the home advantage.

Second round

The 6 winners of the first round and the 10 teams released from playing the first round, making 16 teams, are paired by draw in such a way that, two HPW teams can never face each other. The highest ranked team gets the home advantage. The ranking order is HPW, highest ranked Hoofdklasse (HHK) teams (numbers 13), lowest ranked Hoofdklasse (LHK) teams (numbers 14), MPW and LPW teams. If 2 equally ranked teams face each other, the order in which the 2 teams are drawn decides on the home advantage.

Third round

The 8 winners of the first round are paired by draw. The highest ranked team gets the home advantage. The ranking order is identical as in the second round.

Finals

The 4 winners of the third round are paired by draw. Matches are played on neutral ground and the 2 winners play next season in the 2019–20 Hoofdklasse Sunday leagues.

==== Qualified Teams ====
Club	Qualification	Remark
De Bataven	13th in the Hoofdklasse A Sunday	Released from playing the first round
Fortuna Wormerveer	14th in the Hoofdklasse A Sunday	Released from playing the first round
Leonidas	13th in the Hoofdklasse B Sunday	Released from playing the first round
Vlissingen	14th in the Hoofdklasse B Sunday	Released from playing the first round
JOS Watergraafsmeer	Winner of the first period in the Eerste Klasse A Sunday (2nd)	Released from playing the first round
Boshuizen	Substitute winner of the third period in the Eerste Klasse A Sunday (3rd)	
Uitgeest	Winner of the second period in the Eerste Klasse A Sunday (4th)	
Moerse Boys	Winner of the first period in the Eerste Klasse B Sunday (2nd)	Released from playing the first round
VUC	Substitute winner of the second period in the Eerste Klasse B Sunday (3rd)	
DHC Delft	Substitute winner of the fictional third period in the Eerste Klasse B Sunday (4th)	
SV TOP	Winner of the second period in the Eerste Klasse C Sunday (2nd)	Released from playing the first round
Nemelaer	Winner of the third period in the Eerste Klasse C Sunday (3rd)	
Leones	Substitute winner of the first period in the Eerste Klasse C Sunday (4th)	
ZSV	Winner of the second period in the Eerste Klasse D Sunday (2nd)	Released from playing the first round
Chevremont	Substitute winner of the first period in the Eerste Klasse D Sunday (3rd)	
Deurne	Winner of the third period in the Eerste Klasse D Sunday (4th)	
Bemmel	Substitute winner of the third period in the Eerste Klasse E Sunday (2nd)	Released from playing the first round
Rohda Raalte	Winner of the first period in the Eerste Klasse E Sunday (3rd)	
BVC '12	Winner of the second period in the Eerste Klasse E Sunday (4th)	
Sneek Wit Zwart	Winner of the first period in the Eerste Klasse F Sunday (2nd)	Released from playing the first round
VKW	Substitute winner of the second period in the Eerste Klasse F Sunday (3rd)	
GOMOS	Winner of the third period in the Eerste Klasse F Sunday (4th)	

==== Results ====
First round
30 mei 2019
Chevremont	3
Deurne	2
30 mei 2019
VKW	3
GOMOS	0
30 mei 2019
Boshuizen (a.e.t.)	2
Uitgeest	1

Second round
2 juni 2019
Fortuna Wormerveer (a.e.t.)	3
Chevremont	1
2 juni 2019
De Bataven	1
VKW	2
2 juni 2019
Moerse Boys	4
Vlissingen	2
2 juni 2019
Bemmel	3
Boshuizen	2

Third round
10 juni 2019
Fortuna Wormerveer	1 (6)
VKW (pen.)	1 (7)
10 juni 2019
Moerse Boys	2
Bemmel	1

Final
16 juni 2019
VKW	0
Moerse Boys	1

First round
30 mei 2019
Rohda Raalte	4
BVC '12	1
30 mei 2019
Nemelaer	1
Leones	2
30 mei 2019
VUC	2
DHC Delft (a.e.t.)	3

Second round
2 juni 2019
SV TOP (pen.)	2 (5)
Rohda Raalte	2 (4)
2 juni 2019
ZSV	0
Leonidas	2
2 juni 2019
JOS Watergraafsmeer	5
Leones	1
2 juni 2019
Sneek Wit Zwart	1
DHC Delft	3

Third round
10 juni 2019
SV TOP	0
Leonidas	3
10 juni 2019
JOS Watergraafsmeer	3
DHC Delft	1

Final
16 juni 2019
Leonidas	1
JOS Watergraafsmeer (a.e.t.)	3

Moerse Boys and JOS Watergraafsmeer promoted to the 2019-20 Hoofdklasse Sunday.
De Bataven, Vlissingen and Fortuna Wormerveer relegated to the 2019-20 Eerste Klasse Sunday.
VKW and Leonidas played an extra match.
The other teams remained in the 2019-20 Eerste Klasse Sunday.

==== Extra match ====
Because JVC Cuijk, relegated from the Derde Divisie, decided to stop playing football at top amateur levels completely, due to lack of the necessary funds, an extra spot became available in the Hoofdklasse Sunday leagues. Therefore the two teams who lost in the fourth round of the play-offs were given a second chance. In an extra match, on neutral ground, these teams competed for the spot that became available.

VKW	0–1	Leonidas

Leonidas maintained in the 2019-20 Hoofdklasse Saturday Sunday.
VKW remained in the 2019-20 Eerste Klasse Sunday.

==== Saturday B League ====
Pos	Team	Pld	W	D	L	GF	GA	GD	Pts	Promotion, qualification or relegation
1	Excelsior '31 (C, P)	30	19	7	4	63	26	+37	64	Promotion to 2019–20 Derde Divisie Saturday
2	Staphorst (Note: Winner of the second period (games 11-20).)	30	18	9	3	65	33	+32	63	Qualification for 2019–20 Derde Divisie play-offs
3	Sparta Nijkerk (Note: Winner of the third period (games 21-30).) (O, P)	30	19	6	5	51	29	+22	63	Qualification for 2019–20 Derde Divisie play-offs
4	AZSV	30	17	7	6	47	30	+17	58	
5	ACV (Note: Winner of the first period (games 1-10).)	30	15	9	6	49	33	+16	54	Qualification for 2019–20 Derde Divisie play-offs
6	Urk	30	15	8	7	47	33	+14	53	
7	Berkum	30	12	5	13	46	49	−3	41	
8	DUNO	30	12	4	14	52	52	0	40	
9	SDC Putten	30	10	9	11	47	40	+7	39	
10	Flevo Boys	30	10	6	14	37	43	−6	36	
11	Genemuiden	30	9	6	15	42	49	−7	33	
12	Buitenpost	30	7	8	15	31	57	−26	29	
13	DETO Twenterand (O)	30	8	3	19	35	54	−19	27	Qualification to relegation play-offs
14	CSV Apeldoorn (R)	30	7	5	18	42	66	−24	26	Qualification to relegation play-offs
15	WHC (R)	30	7	4	19	44	68	−24	25	Relegation to 2019–20 Eerste Klasse
16	SVZW (R)	30	4	6	20	39	75	−36	18	Relegation to 2019–20 Eerste Klasse

Source: Soccerway
Rules for classification: 1) points; 2) goal difference; 3) number of goals scored
(C) Champions; (O) Play-off winners; (P) Promoted; (R) Relegated

=== Saturday ===
The numbers 13 and 14 from each of the 2018–19 Hoofdklasse Saturday leagues (2 times 2 teams) and 3 (substitute) period winners of each of the 2018–19 Eerste Klasse Saturday leagues (5 times 3 teams), making 19 teams, decide in a 3-round single match knockout system, which 3 teams play next season in the 2019–20 Hoofdklasse Saturday leagues. The remaining 16 teams play next season in the 2019–20 Eerste Klasse Saturday leagues.

First round

The 2 highest ranked Hoofdklasse teams (numbers 13) are released from playing the first round. Out of the 2 lowest ranked Hoofdklasse teams (numbers 14) and the 5 highest ranked (substitute) period winners (HPWs), 3 more teams are by draw released from playing the first round. The remaining 14 teams are paired by draw in such a way that, a HK or HPW team will always play a lowest ranked (substitute) period winner (LPW), and the highest ranked team gets the home advantage. The ranking order is HPW, HK, middle ranked (substitute) period winner (MPW) and LPW teams. If 2 equally ranked teams face each other, the order in which the 2 teams are drawn decides on the home advantage.

Second round

The 7 winners of the first round and the 5 teams released from playing the first round, making 12 teams, are paired by draw. The highest ranked team gets the home advantage. The ranking order is identical as in the first round.

Finals

The 6 winners of the second round are paired by draw. Matches are played on neutral ground and the 3 winners play next season in the 2019–20 Hoofdklasse Saturday leagues.

==== Qualified Teams ====
Club	Qualification	Remark
Spijkenisse	13th in the Hoofdklasse A Saturday	Released from playing the first round
Nootdorp	14th in the Hoofdklasse A Saturday	Released by draw from playing the first round
DETO Twenterand	13th in the Hoofdklasse B Saturday	Released from playing the first round
CSV Apeldoorn	14th in the Hoofdklasse B Saturday	
ARC	Winner of the third period in the Eerste Klasse A Saturday (2nd)	
AFC	Substitute winner of the second period in the Eerste Klasse A Saturday (3rd)	
Roda '46	Winner of the first period in the Eerste Klasse A Saturday (8th)	
Kloetinge	Winner of the second period in the Eerste Klasse B Saturday (2nd)	Released by draw from playing the first round
SHO	Winner of the first period in the Eerste Klasse B Saturday (3rd)	
Honselersdijk	Substitute winner of the third period in the Eerste Klasse B Saturday (4th)	
Sliedrecht	Winner of the first period in the Eerste Klasse C Saturday (2nd)	
Heerjansdam	Substitute winner of the second period in the Eerste Klasse C Saturday (3rd)	
GRC '14	Winner of the third period in the Eerste Klasse C Saturday (11th)	
Bennekom	Winner of the third period in the Eerste Klasse D Saturday (2nd)	Released by draw from playing the first round
Go-Ahead Kampen	Substitute winner of the first period in the Eerste Klasse D Saturday (3rd)	
DTS Ede	Winner of the second period in the Eerste Klasse D Saturday (5th)	
Oranje Nassau Groningen	Winner of the second period in the Eerste Klasse E Saturday (2nd)	
Winsum	Substitute winner of the first period in the Eerste Klasse E Saturday (3rd)	
Noordscheschut	Winner of the third period in the Eerste Klasse E Saturday (4th)	

==== Results ====
First round
1 juni 2019
Sliedrecht	4
Honselersdijk	1
1 juni 2019
CSV Apeldoorn	0
Roda '46	1

Second round
8 juni 2019
Kloetinge	1
DETO Twenterand (a.e.t.)	3
11 juni 2019
Sliedrecht	5
Roda '46	2

Final
15 juni 2019
DETO Twenterand (a.e.t.)	3
Sliedrecht	1

First round
1 juni 2019
Oranje Nassau Groningen	1
DTS Ede	5
1 juni 2019
ARC	2
GRC '14	1
1 juni 2019
SHO	2
Heerjansdam	1

Second round
8 juni 2019
Nootdorp	0
DTS Ede	4
8 juni 2019
ARC	4
SHO	1

Final
15 juni 2019
DTS Ede	3 (3)
ARC	3 (5)

First round
1 juni 2019
Winsum	1 (3)
Noordscheschut (pen.)	1 (4)
1 juni 2019
Go-Ahead Kampen	6
AFC	2

Second round
8 juni 2019
Spijkenisse	3
Noordscheschut	0
8 juni 2019
Bennekom	0
Go-Ahead Kampen	3

Final
15 juni 2019
Spijkenisse (pen.)	1 (4)
Go-Ahead Kampen	1 (1)

ARC promoted to the 2019-20 Hoofdklasse Saturday.
Spijkenisse and DETO Twenterand maintained in the 2019-20 Hoofdklasse Saturday.
CSV Apeldoorn and Nootdorp relegated to the 2019-20 Eerste Klasse Saturday.
The other teams remained in the 2019-20 Eerste Klasse Saturday.

=== Sunday ===
The numbers 13 and 14 from each of the 2018–19 Hoofdklasse Sunday leagues (2 times 2 teams) and 3 (substitute) period winners of each of the 2018–19 Eerste Klasse Sunday leagues (6 times 3 teams), making 22 teams, decide in a 4-round single match knockout system, which 2 teams play next season in the 2019–20 Hoofdklasse Sunday leagues. The remaining 20 teams play next season in the 2019–20 Eerste Klasse Sunday leagues.

First round

The Hoofdklasse teams and 6 highest ranked (substitute) period winners (HPWs) are released from playing the first round. The 12 remaining (substitute) period winners are paired by draw in such a way that, a middle (substitute) period winner (MPW) will always play a lowest ranked (substitute) period winner (LPW). The MPW teams also get the home advantage.

Second round

The 6 winners of the first round and the 10 teams released from playing the first round, making 16 teams, are paired by draw in such a way that, two HPW teams can never face each other. The highest ranked team gets the home advantage. The ranking order is HPW, highest ranked Hoofdklasse (HHK) teams (numbers 13), lowest ranked Hoofdklasse (LHK) teams (numbers 14), MPW and LPW teams. If 2 equally ranked teams face each other, the order in which the 2 teams are drawn decides on the home advantage.

Third round

The 8 winners of the first round are paired by draw. The highest ranked team gets the home advantage. The ranking order is identical as in the second round.

Finals

The 4 winners of the third round are paired by draw. Matches are played on neutral ground and the 2 winners play next season in the 2019–20 Hoofdklasse Sunday leagues.

==== Qualified Teams ====
Club	Qualification	Remark
De Bataven	13th in the Hoofdklasse A Sunday	Released from playing the first round
Fortuna Wormerveer	14th in the Hoofdklasse A Sunday	Released from playing the first round
Leonidas	13th in the Hoofdklasse B Sunday	Released from playing the first round
Vlissingen	14th in the Hoofdklasse B Sunday	Released from playing the first round
JOS Watergraafsmeer	Winner of the first period in the Eerste Klasse A Sunday (2nd)	Released from playing the first round
Boshuizen	Substitute winner of the third period in the Eerste Klasse A Sunday (3rd)	
Uitgeest	Winner of the second period in the Eerste Klasse A Sunday (4th)	
Moerse Boys	Winner of the first period in the Eerste Klasse B Sunday (2nd)	Released from playing the first round
VUC	Substitute winner of the second period in the Eerste Klasse B Sunday (3rd)	
DHC Delft	Substitute winner of the fictional third period in the Eerste Klasse B Sunday (4th)	
SV TOP	Winner of the second period in the Eerste Klasse C Sunday (2nd)	Released from playing the first round
Nemelaer	Winner of the third period in the Eerste Klasse C Sunday (3rd)	
Leones	Substitute winner of the first period in the Eerste Klasse C Sunday (4th)	
ZSV	Winner of the second period in the Eerste Klasse D Sunday (2nd)	Released from playing the first round
Chevremont	Substitute winner of the first period in the Eerste Klasse D Sunday (3rd)	
Deurne	Winner of the third period in the Eerste Klasse D Sunday (4th)	
Bemmel	Substitute winner of the third period in the Eerste Klasse E Sunday (2nd)	Released from playing the first round
Rohda Raalte	Winner of the first period in the Eerste Klasse E Sunday (3rd)	
BVC '12	Winner of the second period in the Eerste Klasse E Sunday (4th)	
Sneek Wit Zwart	Winner of the first period in the Eerste Klasse F Sunday (2nd)	Released from playing the first round
VKW	Substitute winner of the second period in the Eerste Klasse F Sunday (3rd)	
GOMOS	Winner of the third period in the Eerste Klasse F Sunday (4th)	

==== Results ====
First round
30 mei 2019
Chevremont	3
Deurne	2
30 mei 2019
VKW	3
GOMOS	0
30 mei 2019
Boshuizen (a.e.t.)	2
Uitgeest	1

Second round
2 juni 2019
Fortuna Wormerveer (a.e.t.)	3
Chevremont	1
2 juni 2019
De Bataven	1
VKW	2
2 juni 2019
Moerse Boys	4
Vlissingen	2
2 juni 2019
Bemmel	3
Boshuizen	2

Third round
10 juni 2019
Fortuna Wormerveer	1 (6)
VKW (pen.)	1 (7)
10 juni 2019
Moerse Boys	2
Bemmel	1

Final
16 juni 2019
VKW	0
Moerse Boys	1

First round
30 mei 2019
Rohda Raalte	4
BVC '12	1
30 mei 2019
Nemelaer	1
Leones	2
30 mei 2019
VUC	2
DHC Delft (a.e.t.)	3

Second round
2 juni 2019
SV TOP (pen.)	2 (5)
Rohda Raalte	2 (4)
2 juni 2019
ZSV	0
Leonidas	2
2 juni 2019
JOS Watergraafsmeer	5
Leones	1
2 juni 2019
Sneek Wit Zwart	1
DHC Delft	3

Third round
10 juni 2019
SV TOP	0
Leonidas	3
10 juni 2019
JOS Watergraafsmeer	3
DHC Delft	1

Final
16 juni 2019
Leonidas	1
JOS Watergraafsmeer (a.e.t.)	3

Moerse Boys and JOS Watergraafsmeer promoted to the 2019-20 Hoofdklasse Sunday.
De Bataven, Vlissingen and Fortuna Wormerveer relegated to the 2019-20 Eerste Klasse Sunday.
VKW and Leonidas played an extra match.
The other teams remained in the 2019-20 Eerste Klasse Sunday.

==== Extra match ====
Because JVC Cuijk, relegated from the Derde Divisie, decided to stop playing football at top amateur levels completely, due to lack of the necessary funds, an extra spot became available in the Hoofdklasse Sunday leagues. Therefore the two teams who lost in the fourth round of the play-offs were given a second chance. In an extra match, on neutral ground, these teams competed for the spot that became available.

VKW	0–1	Leonidas

Leonidas maintained in the 2019-20 Hoofdklasse Saturday Sunday.
VKW remained in the 2019-20 Eerste Klasse Sunday.

==== Sunday A League ====
Pos	Team	Pld	W	D	L	GF	GA	GD	Pts	Promotion, qualification or relegation
1	DEM (Note: Winner of the third period (games 21-30).) (C, P)	30	17	9	4	60	31	+29	60	Promotion to 2019–20 Derde Divisie Sunday
2	Hoogeveen (Note: Winner of the first period (games 1-10).)	30	17	6	7	71	45	+26	57	Qualification for 2019–20 Derde Divisie play-offs
3	SDO (Note: Substitute winner of the third period (games 21-30).)	30	18	3	9	69	48	+21	57	Qualification for 2019–20 Derde Divisie play-offs
4	RKZVC	30	16	5	9	59	53	+6	53	
5	Hoogland (Note: Winner of the second period (games 11-20).) (O, P)	30	14	7	9	53	43	+10	49	Qualification for 2019–20 Derde Divisie play-offs
6	MVV Alcides	30	13	5	12	51	51	0	44	
7	Silvolde	30	12	6	12	54	46	+8	42	
8	Hollandia	30	12	6	12	43	49	−6	42	
9	Purmersteijn	30	10	11	9	48	37	+11	41	
10	MSC	30	12	3	15	53	58	−5	39	
11	AWC	30	12	3	15	52	69	−17	39	
12	Be Quick 1887	30	10	7	13	52	51	+1	37	
13	De Bataven (R)	30	10	7	13	51	60	−9	37	Qualification to relegation play-offs
14	Fortuna Wormerveer (R)	30	8	7	15	39	52	−13	31	Qualification to relegation play-offs
15	Achilles 1894 (R)	30	8	6	16	47	59	−12	30	Relegation to 2019–20 Eerste Klasse
16	RKHVV (R)	30	3	5	22	30	80	−50	14	Relegation to 2019–20 Eerste Klasse

Source: Soccerway
Rules for classification: 1) points; 2) goal difference; 3) number of goals scored
(C) Champions; (O) Play-off winners; (P) Promoted; (R) Relegated

=== Saturday ===
The numbers 13 and 14 from each of the 2018–19 Hoofdklasse Saturday leagues (2 times 2 teams) and 3 (substitute) period winners of each of the 2018–19 Eerste Klasse Saturday leagues (5 times 3 teams), making 19 teams, decide in a 3-round single match knockout system, which 3 teams play next season in the 2019–20 Hoofdklasse Saturday leagues. The remaining 16 teams play next season in the 2019–20 Eerste Klasse Saturday leagues.

First round

The 2 highest ranked Hoofdklasse teams (numbers 13) are released from playing the first round. Out of the 2 lowest ranked Hoofdklasse teams (numbers 14) and the 5 highest ranked (substitute) period winners (HPWs), 3 more teams are by draw released from playing the first round. The remaining 14 teams are paired by draw in such a way that, a HK or HPW team will always play a lowest ranked (substitute) period winner (LPW), and the highest ranked team gets the home advantage. The ranking order is HPW, HK, middle ranked (substitute) period winner (MPW) and LPW teams. If 2 equally ranked teams face each other, the order in which the 2 teams are drawn decides on the home advantage.

Second round

The 7 winners of the first round and the 5 teams released from playing the first round, making 12 teams, are paired by draw. The highest ranked team gets the home advantage. The ranking order is identical as in the first round.

Finals

The 6 winners of the second round are paired by draw. Matches are played on neutral ground and the 3 winners play next season in the 2019–20 Hoofdklasse Saturday leagues.

==== Qualified Teams ====
Club	Qualification	Remark
Spijkenisse	13th in the Hoofdklasse A Saturday	Released from playing the first round
Nootdorp	14th in the Hoofdklasse A Saturday	Released by draw from playing the first round
DETO Twenterand	13th in the Hoofdklasse B Saturday	Released from playing the first round
CSV Apeldoorn	14th in the Hoofdklasse B Saturday	
ARC	Winner of the third period in the Eerste Klasse A Saturday (2nd)	
AFC	Substitute winner of the second period in the Eerste Klasse A Saturday (3rd)	
Roda '46	Winner of the first period in the Eerste Klasse A Saturday (8th)	
Kloetinge	Winner of the second period in the Eerste Klasse B Saturday (2nd)	Released by draw from playing the first round
SHO	Winner of the first period in the Eerste Klasse B Saturday (3rd)	
Honselersdijk	Substitute winner of the third period in the Eerste Klasse B Saturday (4th)	
Sliedrecht	Winner of the first period in the Eerste Klasse C Saturday (2nd)	
Heerjansdam	Substitute winner of the second period in the Eerste Klasse C Saturday (3rd)	
GRC '14	Winner of the third period in the Eerste Klasse C Saturday (11th)	
Bennekom	Winner of the third period in the Eerste Klasse D Saturday (2nd)	Released by draw from playing the first round
Go-Ahead Kampen	Substitute winner of the first period in the Eerste Klasse D Saturday (3rd)	
DTS Ede	Winner of the second period in the Eerste Klasse D Saturday (5th)	
Oranje Nassau Groningen	Winner of the second period in the Eerste Klasse E Saturday (2nd)	
Winsum	Substitute winner of the first period in the Eerste Klasse E Saturday (3rd)	
Noordscheschut	Winner of the third period in the Eerste Klasse E Saturday (4th)	

==== Results ====
First round
1 juni 2019
Sliedrecht	4
Honselersdijk	1
1 juni 2019
CSV Apeldoorn	0
Roda '46	1

Second round
8 juni 2019
Kloetinge	1
DETO Twenterand (a.e.t.)	3
11 juni 2019
Sliedrecht	5
Roda '46	2

Final
15 juni 2019
DETO Twenterand (a.e.t.)	3
Sliedrecht	1

First round
1 juni 2019
Oranje Nassau Groningen	1
DTS Ede	5
1 juni 2019
ARC	2
GRC '14	1
1 juni 2019
SHO	2
Heerjansdam	1

Second round
8 juni 2019
Nootdorp	0
DTS Ede	4
8 juni 2019
ARC	4
SHO	1

Final
15 juni 2019
DTS Ede	3 (3)
ARC	3 (5)

First round
1 juni 2019
Winsum	1 (3)
Noordscheschut (pen.)	1 (4)
1 juni 2019
Go-Ahead Kampen	6
AFC	2

Second round
8 juni 2019
Spijkenisse	3
Noordscheschut	0
8 juni 2019
Bennekom	0
Go-Ahead Kampen	3

Final
15 juni 2019
Spijkenisse (pen.)	1 (4)
Go-Ahead Kampen	1 (1)

ARC promoted to the 2019-20 Hoofdklasse Saturday.
Spijkenisse and DETO Twenterand maintained in the 2019-20 Hoofdklasse Saturday.
CSV Apeldoorn and Nootdorp relegated to the 2019-20 Eerste Klasse Saturday.
The other teams remained in the 2019-20 Eerste Klasse Saturday.

=== Sunday ===
The numbers 13 and 14 from each of the 2018–19 Hoofdklasse Sunday leagues (2 times 2 teams) and 3 (substitute) period winners of each of the 2018–19 Eerste Klasse Sunday leagues (6 times 3 teams), making 22 teams, decide in a 4-round single match knockout system, which 2 teams play next season in the 2019–20 Hoofdklasse Sunday leagues. The remaining 20 teams play next season in the 2019–20 Eerste Klasse Sunday leagues.

First round

The Hoofdklasse teams and 6 highest ranked (substitute) period winners (HPWs) are released from playing the first round. The 12 remaining (substitute) period winners are paired by draw in such a way that, a middle (substitute) period winner (MPW) will always play a lowest ranked (substitute) period winner (LPW). The MPW teams also get the home advantage.

Second round

The 6 winners of the first round and the 10 teams released from playing the first round, making 16 teams, are paired by draw in such a way that, two HPW teams can never face each other. The highest ranked team gets the home advantage. The ranking order is HPW, highest ranked Hoofdklasse (HHK) teams (numbers 13), lowest ranked Hoofdklasse (LHK) teams (numbers 14), MPW and LPW teams. If 2 equally ranked teams face each other, the order in which the 2 teams are drawn decides on the home advantage.

Third round

The 8 winners of the first round are paired by draw. The highest ranked team gets the home advantage. The ranking order is identical as in the second round.

Finals

The 4 winners of the third round are paired by draw. Matches are played on neutral ground and the 2 winners play next season in the 2019–20 Hoofdklasse Sunday leagues.

==== Qualified Teams ====
Club	Qualification	Remark
De Bataven	13th in the Hoofdklasse A Sunday	Released from playing the first round
Fortuna Wormerveer	14th in the Hoofdklasse A Sunday	Released from playing the first round
Leonidas	13th in the Hoofdklasse B Sunday	Released from playing the first round
Vlissingen	14th in the Hoofdklasse B Sunday	Released from playing the first round
JOS Watergraafsmeer	Winner of the first period in the Eerste Klasse A Sunday (2nd)	Released from playing the first round
Boshuizen	Substitute winner of the third period in the Eerste Klasse A Sunday (3rd)	
Uitgeest	Winner of the second period in the Eerste Klasse A Sunday (4th)	
Moerse Boys	Winner of the first period in the Eerste Klasse B Sunday (2nd)	Released from playing the first round
VUC	Substitute winner of the second period in the Eerste Klasse B Sunday (3rd)	
DHC Delft	Substitute winner of the fictional third period in the Eerste Klasse B Sunday (4th)	
SV TOP	Winner of the second period in the Eerste Klasse C Sunday (2nd)	Released from playing the first round
Nemelaer	Winner of the third period in the Eerste Klasse C Sunday (3rd)	
Leones	Substitute winner of the first period in the Eerste Klasse C Sunday (4th)	
ZSV	Winner of the second period in the Eerste Klasse D Sunday (2nd)	Released from playing the first round
Chevremont	Substitute winner of the first period in the Eerste Klasse D Sunday (3rd)	
Deurne	Winner of the third period in the Eerste Klasse D Sunday (4th)	
Bemmel	Substitute winner of the third period in the Eerste Klasse E Sunday (2nd)	Released from playing the first round
Rohda Raalte	Winner of the first period in the Eerste Klasse E Sunday (3rd)	
BVC '12	Winner of the second period in the Eerste Klasse E Sunday (4th)	
Sneek Wit Zwart	Winner of the first period in the Eerste Klasse F Sunday (2nd)	Released from playing the first round
VKW	Substitute winner of the second period in the Eerste Klasse F Sunday (3rd)	
GOMOS	Winner of the third period in the Eerste Klasse F Sunday (4th)	

==== Results ====
First round
30 mei 2019
Chevremont	3
Deurne	2
30 mei 2019
VKW	3
GOMOS	0
30 mei 2019
Boshuizen (a.e.t.)	2
Uitgeest	1

Second round
2 juni 2019
Fortuna Wormerveer (a.e.t.)	3
Chevremont	1
2 juni 2019
De Bataven	1
VKW	2
2 juni 2019
Moerse Boys	4
Vlissingen	2
2 juni 2019
Bemmel	3
Boshuizen	2

Third round
10 juni 2019
Fortuna Wormerveer	1 (6)
VKW (pen.)	1 (7)
10 juni 2019
Moerse Boys	2
Bemmel	1

Final
16 juni 2019
VKW	0
Moerse Boys	1

First round
30 mei 2019
Rohda Raalte	4
BVC '12	1
30 mei 2019
Nemelaer	1
Leones	2
30 mei 2019
VUC	2
DHC Delft (a.e.t.)	3

Second round
2 juni 2019
SV TOP (pen.)	2 (5)
Rohda Raalte	2 (4)
2 juni 2019
ZSV	0
Leonidas	2
2 juni 2019
JOS Watergraafsmeer	5
Leones	1
2 juni 2019
Sneek Wit Zwart	1
DHC Delft	3

Third round
10 juni 2019
SV TOP	0
Leonidas	3
10 juni 2019
JOS Watergraafsmeer	3
DHC Delft	1

Final
16 juni 2019
Leonidas	1
JOS Watergraafsmeer (a.e.t.)	3

Moerse Boys and JOS Watergraafsmeer promoted to the 2019-20 Hoofdklasse Sunday.
De Bataven, Vlissingen and Fortuna Wormerveer relegated to the 2019-20 Eerste Klasse Sunday.
VKW and Leonidas played an extra match.
The other teams remained in the 2019-20 Eerste Klasse Sunday.

==== Extra match ====
Because JVC Cuijk, relegated from the Derde Divisie, decided to stop playing football at top amateur levels completely, due to lack of the necessary funds, an extra spot became available in the Hoofdklasse Sunday leagues. Therefore the two teams who lost in the fourth round of the play-offs were given a second chance. In an extra match, on neutral ground, these teams competed for the spot that became available.

VKW	0–1	Leonidas

Leonidas maintained in the 2019-20 Hoofdklasse Saturday Sunday.
VKW remained in the 2019-20 Eerste Klasse Sunday.

==== Sunday B League ====
Pos	Team	Pld	W	D	L	GF	GA	GD	Pts	Promotion, qualification or relegation
1	Groene Ster (Note: Winner of the second period (games 15-28).) (C, P)	28	20	4	4	61	27	+34	64	Promotion to 2019–20 Derde Divisie Sunday
2	Gemert (Note: Substitute winner of the second period (games 15-28).) (O, P)	28	19	2	7	80	36	+44	59	Qualification for 2019–20 Derde Divisie play-offs
3	Halsteren (Note: Substitute winner of the fictional third period.)	28	16	9	3	57	22	+35	57	Qualification for 2019–20 Derde Divisie play-offs
4	Baronie	28	17	5	6	52	30	+22	56	
5	Unitas (Note: Winner of the first period (games 1-14).)	28	17	2	9	59	42	+17	53	Qualification for 2019–20 Derde Divisie play-offs
6	Meerssen	28	10	8	10	39	44	−5	38	
7	Nuenen	28	10	7	11	42	39	+3	37	
8	Alphense Boys	28	10	6	12	51	47	+4	36	
9	UDI '19	28	9	7	12	36	42	−6	34	
10	Minor	28	8	7	13	39	54	−15	31	
11	RKAVV	28	8	5	15	33	42	−9	29	
12	IFC	28	8	4	16	46	66	−20	28	
13	Leonidas (O)	28	7	7	14	38	65	−27	28	Qualification to relegation play-offs
14	Vlissingen (R)	28	7	5	16	30	52	−22	26	Qualification to relegation play-offs
15	De Meern (R)	28	3	4	21	25	80	−55	13	Relegation to 2019–20 Eerste Klasse
16	Papendorp (Note: Papendorp were removed from the league after two consecutive no shows.) (R)	8	0	1	7	2	53	−51	1	Removed from league, relegated to 2019–20 Eerste Klasse

Updated to match(es) played on 26 May 2019. Source: Soccerway
Rules for classification: 1) points; 2) goal difference; 3) number of goals scored
(C) Champions; (O) Play-off winners; (P) Promoted; (R) Relegated

=== Saturday ===
The numbers 13 and 14 from each of the 2018–19 Hoofdklasse Saturday leagues (2 times 2 teams) and 3 (substitute) period winners of each of the 2018–19 Eerste Klasse Saturday leagues (5 times 3 teams), making 19 teams, decide in a 3-round single match knockout system, which 3 teams play next season in the 2019–20 Hoofdklasse Saturday leagues. The remaining 16 teams play next season in the 2019–20 Eerste Klasse Saturday leagues.

First round

The 2 highest ranked Hoofdklasse teams (numbers 13) are released from playing the first round. Out of the 2 lowest ranked Hoofdklasse teams (numbers 14) and the 5 highest ranked (substitute) period winners (HPWs), 3 more teams are by draw released from playing the first round. The remaining 14 teams are paired by draw in such a way that, a HK or HPW team will always play a lowest ranked (substitute) period winner (LPW), and the highest ranked team gets the home advantage. The ranking order is HPW, HK, middle ranked (substitute) period winner (MPW) and LPW teams. If 2 equally ranked teams face each other, the order in which the 2 teams are drawn decides on the home advantage.

Second round

The 7 winners of the first round and the 5 teams released from playing the first round, making 12 teams, are paired by draw. The highest ranked team gets the home advantage. The ranking order is identical as in the first round.

Finals

The 6 winners of the second round are paired by draw. Matches are played on neutral ground and the 3 winners play next season in the 2019–20 Hoofdklasse Saturday leagues.

==== Qualified Teams ====
Club	Qualification	Remark
Spijkenisse	13th in the Hoofdklasse A Saturday	Released from playing the first round
Nootdorp	14th in the Hoofdklasse A Saturday	Released by draw from playing the first round
DETO Twenterand	13th in the Hoofdklasse B Saturday	Released from playing the first round
CSV Apeldoorn	14th in the Hoofdklasse B Saturday	
ARC	Winner of the third period in the Eerste Klasse A Saturday (2nd)	
AFC	Substitute winner of the second period in the Eerste Klasse A Saturday (3rd)	
Roda '46	Winner of the first period in the Eerste Klasse A Saturday (8th)	
Kloetinge	Winner of the second period in the Eerste Klasse B Saturday (2nd)	Released by draw from playing the first round
SHO	Winner of the first period in the Eerste Klasse B Saturday (3rd)	
Honselersdijk	Substitute winner of the third period in the Eerste Klasse B Saturday (4th)	
Sliedrecht	Winner of the first period in the Eerste Klasse C Saturday (2nd)	
Heerjansdam	Substitute winner of the second period in the Eerste Klasse C Saturday (3rd)	
GRC '14	Winner of the third period in the Eerste Klasse C Saturday (11th)	
Bennekom	Winner of the third period in the Eerste Klasse D Saturday (2nd)	Released by draw from playing the first round
Go-Ahead Kampen	Substitute winner of the first period in the Eerste Klasse D Saturday (3rd)	
DTS Ede	Winner of the second period in the Eerste Klasse D Saturday (5th)	
Oranje Nassau Groningen	Winner of the second period in the Eerste Klasse E Saturday (2nd)	
Winsum	Substitute winner of the first period in the Eerste Klasse E Saturday (3rd)	
Noordscheschut	Winner of the third period in the Eerste Klasse E Saturday (4th)	

==== Results ====
First round
1 juni 2019
Sliedrecht	4
Honselersdijk	1
1 juni 2019
CSV Apeldoorn	0
Roda '46	1

Second round
8 juni 2019
Kloetinge	1
DETO Twenterand (a.e.t.)	3
11 juni 2019
Sliedrecht	5
Roda '46	2

Final
15 juni 2019
DETO Twenterand (a.e.t.)	3
Sliedrecht	1

First round
1 juni 2019
Oranje Nassau Groningen	1
DTS Ede	5
1 juni 2019
ARC	2
GRC '14	1
1 juni 2019
SHO	2
Heerjansdam	1

Second round
8 juni 2019
Nootdorp	0
DTS Ede	4
8 juni 2019
ARC	4
SHO	1

Final
15 juni 2019
DTS Ede	3 (3)
ARC	3 (5)

First round
1 juni 2019
Winsum	1 (3)
Noordscheschut (pen.)	1 (4)
1 juni 2019
Go-Ahead Kampen	6
AFC	2

Second round
8 juni 2019
Spijkenisse	3
Noordscheschut	0
8 juni 2019
Bennekom	0
Go-Ahead Kampen	3

Final
15 juni 2019
Spijkenisse (pen.)	1 (4)
Go-Ahead Kampen	1 (1)

ARC promoted to the 2019-20 Hoofdklasse Saturday.
Spijkenisse and DETO Twenterand maintained in the 2019-20 Hoofdklasse Saturday.
CSV Apeldoorn and Nootdorp relegated to the 2019-20 Eerste Klasse Saturday.
The other teams remained in the 2019-20 Eerste Klasse Saturday.

=== Sunday ===
The numbers 13 and 14 from each of the 2018–19 Hoofdklasse Sunday leagues (2 times 2 teams) and 3 (substitute) period winners of each of the 2018–19 Eerste Klasse Sunday leagues (6 times 3 teams), making 22 teams, decide in a 4-round single match knockout system, which 2 teams play next season in the 2019–20 Hoofdklasse Sunday leagues. The remaining 20 teams play next season in the 2019–20 Eerste Klasse Sunday leagues.

First round

The Hoofdklasse teams and 6 highest ranked (substitute) period winners (HPWs) are released from playing the first round. The 12 remaining (substitute) period winners are paired by draw in such a way that, a middle (substitute) period winner (MPW) will always play a lowest ranked (substitute) period winner (LPW). The MPW teams also get the home advantage.

Second round

The 6 winners of the first round and the 10 teams released from playing the first round, making 16 teams, are paired by draw in such a way that, two HPW teams can never face each other. The highest ranked team gets the home advantage. The ranking order is HPW, highest ranked Hoofdklasse (HHK) teams (numbers 13), lowest ranked Hoofdklasse (LHK) teams (numbers 14), MPW and LPW teams. If 2 equally ranked teams face each other, the order in which the 2 teams are drawn decides on the home advantage.

Third round

The 8 winners of the first round are paired by draw. The highest ranked team gets the home advantage. The ranking order is identical as in the second round.

Finals

The 4 winners of the third round are paired by draw. Matches are played on neutral ground and the 2 winners play next season in the 2019–20 Hoofdklasse Sunday leagues.

==== Qualified Teams ====
Club	Qualification	Remark
De Bataven	13th in the Hoofdklasse A Sunday	Released from playing the first round
Fortuna Wormerveer	14th in the Hoofdklasse A Sunday	Released from playing the first round
Leonidas	13th in the Hoofdklasse B Sunday	Released from playing the first round
Vlissingen	14th in the Hoofdklasse B Sunday	Released from playing the first round
JOS Watergraafsmeer	Winner of the first period in the Eerste Klasse A Sunday (2nd)	Released from playing the first round
Boshuizen	Substitute winner of the third period in the Eerste Klasse A Sunday (3rd)	
Uitgeest	Winner of the second period in the Eerste Klasse A Sunday (4th)	
Moerse Boys	Winner of the first period in the Eerste Klasse B Sunday (2nd)	Released from playing the first round
VUC	Substitute winner of the second period in the Eerste Klasse B Sunday (3rd)	
DHC Delft	Substitute winner of the fictional third period in the Eerste Klasse B Sunday (4th)	
SV TOP	Winner of the second period in the Eerste Klasse C Sunday (2nd)	Released from playing the first round
Nemelaer	Winner of the third period in the Eerste Klasse C Sunday (3rd)	
Leones	Substitute winner of the first period in the Eerste Klasse C Sunday (4th)	
ZSV	Winner of the second period in the Eerste Klasse D Sunday (2nd)	Released from playing the first round
Chevremont	Substitute winner of the first period in the Eerste Klasse D Sunday (3rd)	
Deurne	Winner of the third period in the Eerste Klasse D Sunday (4th)	
Bemmel	Substitute winner of the third period in the Eerste Klasse E Sunday (2nd)	Released from playing the first round
Rohda Raalte	Winner of the first period in the Eerste Klasse E Sunday (3rd)	
BVC '12	Winner of the second period in the Eerste Klasse E Sunday (4th)	
Sneek Wit Zwart	Winner of the first period in the Eerste Klasse F Sunday (2nd)	Released from playing the first round
VKW	Substitute winner of the second period in the Eerste Klasse F Sunday (3rd)	
GOMOS	Winner of the third period in the Eerste Klasse F Sunday (4th)	

==== Results ====
First round
30 mei 2019
Chevremont	3
Deurne	2
30 mei 2019
VKW	3
GOMOS	0
30 mei 2019
Boshuizen (a.e.t.)	2
Uitgeest	1

Second round
2 juni 2019
Fortuna Wormerveer (a.e.t.)	3
Chevremont	1
2 juni 2019
De Bataven	1
VKW	2
2 juni 2019
Moerse Boys	4
Vlissingen	2
2 juni 2019
Bemmel	3
Boshuizen	2

Third round
10 juni 2019
Fortuna Wormerveer	1 (6)
VKW (pen.)	1 (7)
10 juni 2019
Moerse Boys	2
Bemmel	1

Final
16 juni 2019
VKW	0
Moerse Boys	1

First round
30 mei 2019
Rohda Raalte	4
BVC '12	1
30 mei 2019
Nemelaer	1
Leones	2
30 mei 2019
VUC	2
DHC Delft (a.e.t.)	3

Second round
2 juni 2019
SV TOP (pen.)	2 (5)
Rohda Raalte	2 (4)
2 juni 2019
ZSV	0
Leonidas	2
2 juni 2019
JOS Watergraafsmeer	5
Leones	1
2 juni 2019
Sneek Wit Zwart	1
DHC Delft	3

Third round
10 juni 2019
SV TOP	0
Leonidas	3
10 juni 2019
JOS Watergraafsmeer	3
DHC Delft	1

Final
16 juni 2019
Leonidas	1
JOS Watergraafsmeer (a.e.t.)	3

Moerse Boys and JOS Watergraafsmeer promoted to the 2019-20 Hoofdklasse Sunday.
De Bataven, Vlissingen and Fortuna Wormerveer relegated to the 2019-20 Eerste Klasse Sunday.
VKW and Leonidas played an extra match.
The other teams remained in the 2019-20 Eerste Klasse Sunday.

==== Extra match ====
Because JVC Cuijk, relegated from the Derde Divisie, decided to stop playing football at top amateur levels completely, due to lack of the necessary funds, an extra spot became available in the Hoofdklasse Sunday leagues. Therefore the two teams who lost in the fourth round of the play-offs were given a second chance. In an extra match, on neutral ground, these teams competed for the spot that became available.

VKW	0–1	Leonidas

Leonidas maintained in the 2019-20 Hoofdklasse Saturday Sunday.
VKW remained in the 2019-20 Eerste Klasse Sunday.

=== Eredivisie (women) ===
Pos	Team	Pld	W	D	L	GF	GA	GD	Pts	Qualification or relegation
1	PSV	16	13	1	2	54	11	+43	40	Qualification to Championship play-off
2	Twente	16	11	3	2	52	18	+34	36	Qualification to Championship play-off
3	Ajax	16	9	4	3	38	14	+24	31	Qualification to Championship play-off
4	ADO Den Haag	16	9	1	6	42	23	+19	28	Qualification to Championship play-off
5	PEC Zwolle	16	6	2	8	34	34	0	20	Qualification to Championship play-off
6	Alkmaar	16	6	2	8	24	40	−16	20	Qualification to Placement play-off
7	Heerenveen	16	5	4	7	34	36	−2	19	Qualification to Placement play-off
8	Excelsior/Barendrecht	16	2	1	13	14	44	−30	7	Qualification to Placement play-off
9	Achilles '29	16	2	0	14	10	82	−72	6	Qualification to Placement play-off

Source: Soccerway
Rules for classification: Season in progress: 1) Most points won; 2) Less points lost; 3) Goal difference; 4) Goals scored; 5) Alphabetical order; End of season: 1) Points; 2) Goal difference; 3) Goals scored; 4) Head-to-head points; 5) Head-to-head goal difference; 6) Head-to-head away goals scored; 7) Play-off if relevant for deciding champion, relegation or participating in a European league, otherwise by draw. 8) Penalty shoot-out (only after a play-off)

=== Managerial changes ===
Team	Outgoing manager	Manner of departure	Date of vacancy	Position in table	Replaced by	Date of appointment

== National teams ==
=== Netherlands national football team ===
==== 2018–19 UEFA Nations League ====
Pos	Team	Pld	W	D	L	GF	GA	GD	Pts	Qualification (Note: Due to revamp of the format for the 2020–21 UEFA Nations League, no teams were eventually relegated.)	(Netherlands)	(France)	(Germany)
1	Netherlands	4	2	1	1	8	4	+4	7 (Note: Head-to-head goal difference: Netherlands +1, France −1.)	Qualification for Nations League Finals	—	2–0	3–0
2	France	4	2	1	1	4	4	0	7		2–1	—	2–1
3	Germany	4	0	2	2	3	7	−4	2		2–2	0–0	—

Source: UEFA
Rules for classification: Tiebreakers
Notes:

6 September 2018 Friendly	Netherlands	2–1	Peru	Johan Cruyff Arena, Amsterdam
20:45	Depay 60', 83'	Report	Aquino 13'	Attendance: 40127; Referee: Tobias Stieler (Germany)

9 September 2018 2018–19 UEFA Nations League	France	2–1	Netherlands	Stade de France, Saint-Denis
20:45	Mbappé 14'; Giroud 75'	Report	Babel 67'	Attendance: 76,452; Referee: Alberto Undiano Mallenco (Spain)

13 October 2018 2018–19 UEFA Nations League	Netherlands	3–0	Germany	Johan Cruyff Arena, Amsterdam
20:45	Van Dijk 30'; Depay 87'; Wijnaldum 90+3'	Report		Attendance: 52,536; Referee: Cüneyt Çakır (Turkey)

16 October 2018 Friendly	Belgium	1–1	Netherlands	Stade Roi Baudouin, Brussels
20:45	Mertens 5'	Report	Groeneveld 27'	Attendance: 34747; Referee: Artur Soares Dias (Portugal)

16 November 2018 2018–19 UEFA Nations League	Netherlands	2–0	France	De Kuip, Rotterdam
20:45	Wijnaldum 44'; Depay 90+6' (pen.)	Report		Attendance: 44,366; Referee: Anthony Taylor (England)

19 November 2018 2018–19 UEFA Nations League	Germany	2–2	Netherlands	Veltins-Arena, Gelsenkirchen
20:45	Werner 9'; Sané 20'	Report	Promes 85'; Van Dijk 90+1'	Attendance: 42,186; Referee: Ovidiu Hațegan (Romania)

==== 2019 UEFA Nations League Finals ====
Semi-finals
5 June – Porto
Portugal	3
Switzerland	1
6 June – Guimarães
Netherlands (a.e.t.)	3
England	1

Final
9 June – Porto
Portugal	1
Netherlands	0
Third place play-off
9 June – Guimarães
Switzerland	0 (5)
England (p)	0 (6)

==== UEFA Euro 2020 Qualification ====
Pos	Team	Pld	W	D	L	GF	GA	GD	Pts	Qualification	(Germany)	(Netherlands)	(Northern Ireland)	(Belarus)	(Estonia)
1	Germany	8	7	0	1	30	7	+23	21	Qualify for final tournament	—	2–4	6–1	4–0	8–0
2	Netherlands	8	6	1	1	24	7	+17	19	Qualify for final tournament	2–3	—	3–1	4–0	5–0
3	Northern Ireland	8	4	1	3	9	13	−4	13	Advance to play-offs via Nations League	0–2	0–0	—	2–1	2–0
4	Belarus	8	1	1	6	4	16	−12	4	Advance to play-offs via Nations League	0–2	1–2	0–1	—	0–0
5	Estonia	8	0	1	7	2	26	−24	1		0–3	0–4	1–2	1–2	—

Source: UEFA

The fixtures were released by UEFA the same day as the draw, which was held on 2 December 2018 in Dublin. Times are CET/CEST, (Note: CET (UTC+1) for matches between 28 October 2018 and 31 March 2019, and CEST (UTC+2) for all other matches.) as listed by UEFA (local times, if different, are in parentheses).

21 March 2019	Netherlands	4–0	Belarus	De Kuip, Rotterdam
20:45	Depay 1', 55' (pen.); Wijnaldum 21'; Van Dijk 86'	Report		Attendance: 38,604; Referee: Davide Massa (Italy)

24 March 2019	Netherlands	2–3	Germany	Johan Cruyff Arena, Amsterdam
20:45	De Ligt 48'; Depay 63'	Report	Sané 15'; Gnabry 34'; Schulz 90'	Attendance: 51,694; Referee: Jesús Gil Manzano (Spain)

=== Netherlands women's national football team ===
==== 2019 FIFA Women's World Cup ====
===== Group E =====
Pos	Team	Pld	W	D	L	GF	GA	GD	Pts	Qualification
1	Netherlands	3	3	0	0	6	2	+4	9	Advance to knockout stage
2	Canada	3	2	0	1	4	2	+2	6	Advance to knockout stage
3	Cameroon	3	1	0	2	3	5	−2	3	Advance to knockout stage
4	New Zealand	3	0	0	3	1	5	−4	0	

Source: FIFA
Rules for classification: Group stage tiebreakers

11 June 2019 2019 FIFA Women's World Cup – GS	New Zealand	0–1	Netherlands	Le Havre, France
15:00 CEST		Report	Roord 90+2'	Stadium: Stade Océane; Attendance: 10,654; Referee: Edina Alves Batista (Brazil)

15 June 2019 2019 FIFA Women's World Cup – GS	Netherlands	3–1	Cameroon	Valenciennes, France
15:00 CEST	Miedema 41', 85'; Bloodworth 48'	Report	Onguéné 43'	Stadium: Stade du Hainaut; Attendance: 22,423; Referee: Casey Reibelt (Australia)

20 June 2019 2019 FIFA Women's World Cup – GS	Netherlands	2–1	Canada	Reims, France
15:00 CEST	Dekker 54'; Beerensteyn 75'	Report	Sinclair 60'	Stadium: Stade Auguste-Delaune; Attendance: 19,277; Referee: Stéphanie Frappart (France)

===== Knockout stage =====
25 June 2019 2019 FIFA Women's World Cup – R16	Netherlands	2–1	Japan	Rennes, France
21:00 CEST	Martens 17', 90' (pen.)	Report	Hasegawa 43'	Stadium: Roazhon Park; Attendance: 21,076; Referee: Melissa Borjas (Honduras)

29 June 2019 2019 FIFA Women's World Cup – QF	Italy	0–2	Netherlands	Valenciennes, France
15:00 CEST		Report	Miedema 70'; Van der Gragt 80'	Stadium: Stade du Hainaut; Attendance: 22,600; Referee: Claudia Umpiérrez (Uruguay)

3 July 2019 2019 FIFA Women's World Cup – SF	Netherlands	1–0 (a.e.t.)	Sweden	Décines-Charpieu, France
21:00 CEST	Groenen 99'	Report		Stadium: Parc Olympique Lyonnais; Attendance: 48,452; Referee: Marie-Soleil Beaudoin (Canada)

7 July 2019 2019 FIFA Women's World Cup – Final	United States	2–0	Netherlands	Décines-Charpieu, France
17:00 CEST	Rapinoe 61' (pen.); Lavelle 69'	Report		Stadium: Parc Olympique Lyonnais; Attendance: 57,900; Referee: Stéphanie Frappart (France)

== Diary of the season ==
In May 2019, the referee scored a goal for HSV Hoek against Harkemase Boys in the fourth tier. The goal was all the more noteworthy because it occurred on the last weekend possible before rules changes came into effect from 1 June to stop this kind of activity on the part of the referee.

== Retirements ==
- Robin van Persie
