= 2019–20 Eerste Klasse =

Eerste Klasse
- Season: 2019–20

The 2019–20 Eerste Klasse season was a season of the Eerste Klasse.

== Effects of the COVID-19 pandemic ==
On 12 March 2020, all football leagues were suspended until 31 March as the Dutch government forbade events due to the COVID-19 pandemic in the Netherlands. On 15 March this period was extended until 6 April. Due to the decision of the Dutch government to forbid all gatherings and events until 1 June 2020, this period was even further extended.

Eventually, on 31 March 2020, the KNVB decided not to resume competitions at the amateur level. They also decided, for those competitions involved, there would be no final standings, and therefore no champions, initially no promotions and no relegations. All teams will start next season at the same level as they did this season.

Following the cancellation, Meppeler Sport Club and Quick '20 gave up playing Sunday football to compete only on Saturdays and the KNVB promoted the four Hoofdklasse group leaders and two best runners-up to the Derde Divisie. A total of six Eerste Klasse clubs were promoted to fill vacancies in the higher league.

== Saturday sections ==
Participating clubs were:

=== A: West I ===
- Amsterdamsche FC
- Argon
- BOL
- Breukelen
- De Bilt
- HEDW
- Huizen
- Monnickendam
- Roda '46
- Scherpenzeel Promoted
- Woudenberg
- ZOB
- Zuidvogels
- Zwaluwen '30

=== B: West II ===
- Brielle
- BVCB
- Die Haghe
- Forum Sport
- Heinenoord
- Honselersdijk
- Neptunus-Schiebroek
- Nootdorp
- Poortugaal Promoted
- RVVH
- SHO
- VELO
- Voorschoten '97
- XerxesDZB

=== C: South ===
- Almkerk
- GRC '14
- Heerjansdam
- Kloetinge
- Leerdam
- Montfoort
- Nieuw-Lekkerland
- Nivo Sparta
- Oranje Wit
- Papendrecht
- Sliedrecht
- SVL
- Terneuzense Boys
- WNC

=== D: East ===
- Bennekom
- CSV Apeldoorn
- DFS
- DOS '37
- DOS Kampen
- Ede
- DZC '68
- Kampen
- Hierden
- KHC
- Nunspeet
- Barneveld
- WHC
- SVZW

=== E: North ===
- Balk
- Blauw Wit '34
- Broeksterwoude
- Drachten
- VV Groningen
- Leeuwarder Zwaluwen
- Noordscheschut Promoted
- Olde Veste
- Oranje Nassau
- Pelikaan-S
- PKC '83
- SVI
- Winsum
- Zeerobben

== Sunday sections ==
Participating clubs are:

=== A: West I ===
- AFC '34
- AGB
- DSOV
- Fortuna Wormerveer
- Hoofddorp
- Kolping Boys
- Legmeervogels
- LSVV
- De Meern
- Papendorp
- SDZ
- Uitgeest
- Zaanlandia
- De Zouaven Promoted

=== B: West II ===
- Boshuizen
- DHC
- DOSKO
- Den Hoorn
- Hillegersberg
- Olympia Gouda
- ROAC
- Rood Wit
- Spartaan '20
- TAC '90 Promoted
- TOGB Promoted
- Vlissingen
- VUC
- Zwervers

=== C: South I ===
- Alverna
- Best
- Brabantia
- FC Eindhoven AV
- Erp
- HVCH
- Leones
- SC NEC
- Nemelaer
- Rhode
- SV TOP
- Unitas '30
- Woezik
- 't Zand

=== D: South II ===
- Chevremont
- Deurne
- Geldrop
- Heeze
- Limburgia
- SSS '18
- De Ster
- Venray
- Susteren
- Venlo
- Veritas
- Wilhelmina '08
- Wittenhorst
- ZSV

=== E: East ===
- De Bataven
- Bemmel
- BVC '12
- Heino
- Orion
- Rigtersbleek
- RKHVV
- Raalte
- Stevo
- Tubantia
- TVC '28
- Voorwaarts Twello
- Winterswijk
- De Zweef

=== F: North ===
- Dalfsen
- FVC
- GAVC
- Gomos
- GRC Groningen
- VV Heerenveen
- Hoogezand
- Noordster
- Roden
- Sneek Wit Zwart
- Stadspark
- SVBO
- VKW
- WVV 1896
