= 2016–17 Eerste Klasse =

Eerste Klasse
- Season: 2016–17

2016–17 Eerste Klasse was a Dutch association football season of the Eerste Klasse.

Saturday champions were:

- Amsterdamsche Football Club
- FC 's-Gravenzande
- VV Rijsoord
- VV Berkum
- HZVV

Sunday champions were:

- VPV Purmersteijn
- RKSV Leonidas
- VV Baronie
- SV Meerssen
- BVC '12
- Achilles 1894
