= David Panka =

Dutch footballer

Personal information
- Full name: David Jonathan Panka
- Date of birth: 3 October 1999 (age 27)
- Place of birth: Almere, Netherlands
- Height: 1.90 m (6 ft 3 in)
- Position: Winger

Youth career
- –2012: ASC Nieuwland
- 2012–2014: Vitesse
- 2014–2015: SV Spakenburg
- 2015–2017: Roda '46
- 2017–2018: Cambuur
- 2019–2020: RKC Waalwijk

Senior career*
Years	Team	Apps	(Gls)
2020	Miedź Legnica II	2	(0)
2020-2026	Miedź Legnica	12	(1)
2021	Sporting Kansas City II	0	(0)
2021–2022	Panathinaikos B	12	(1)
2022–2023	Hertha BSC II	4	(0)
2024-2025	SV Werder Bremen II	12	(0)
- * Club domestic league appearances and goals as of 1/03/2026

David Jonathan Panka (born 3 October 1999) is a Dutch former professional footballer who played as a winger.

== Career ==
Following the disbandment of the RKC Waalwijk youth team, Panka joined Polish I liga side Miedź Legnica in July 2020. After his contract was terminated at the end of 2020, Panka later moved to USL Championship side Sporting Kansas City II on 19 February 2021. However, his contract was mutually terminated on 6 May 2021.

== Personal ==
Panka holds both Dutch and Polish citizenship.
