= Serhat Çakmak =

Turkish footballer (born 1995

Personal information
- Date of birth: 16 May 1995 (age 31)
- Place of birth: Rotterdam, Netherlands
- Height: 1.77 m (5 ft 10 in)
- Position: Forward

Team information
- Current team: VUC

Youth career
- 2000–2003: Haaglandia
- 2003–2014: Ajax

Senior career*
Years	Team	Apps	(Gls)
2014	Trabzonspor	0	(0)
2014–2015	Ajax Amateurs	3	(0)
2015–2016	Bayrampaşaspor	19	(1)
2016–2017	Jong Utrecht	12	(1)
2017	Tepecikspor		
2017–2018	DHSC		
2019–2020	Nootdorp		
2020–2022	Westlandia	8	(2)
2022–2024	TAC '90		
2024-2026	BMT		
2026-	VUC		

International career
2009	Turkey U15	3	(1)
2010	Turkey U16	6	(2)
- * Club domestic league appearances and goals as of 29 November 2017

Serhat Çakmak (born 16 May 1995) is a Turkish footballer who plays as a forward for Dutch amateur side VUC. He is a Turkish youth international having earned caps with the under-15 and under-16 teams.

== Club career ==
=== Early career ===
Çakmak is a product of the Ajax Youth Academy, and was also a part of Ajax squad in the 2013–14 UEFA Youth League. In 2014, he left the club to join Trabzonspor, signing a three-year contract with the Turkish club after rejecting interest from Beşiktaş J.K., Fenerbahçe, Galatasaray. Following the departure of Trabzonspor manager Hami Mandıralı, Çakmak was cut from the squad under newly appointed manager Vahid Halilhodžić. He returned to Amsterdam, joining Ajax Zaterdag competing in the Topklasse. He made his debut for the amateur side on 20 October 2014 in the third round KNVB Cup home match against Koninklijke HFC which ended in a 2–0 loss. He made his Topklasse debut against the Kozakken Boys on 25 October 2014 in another 2–0 loss.

=== Bayrampaşaspor ===
On 2 February 2015 it was announced that Çakmak had signed a contract with TFF Second League side Bayrampaşaspor. He made his first appearance on 15 February 2015 in a 2–1 victory against Menemen Belediyespor.

=== Later career ===
Çakmak went back to his native Netherlands to play for Utrecht in the Eredivisie on Saturday 13 February 2016.

In October 2019, Çakmak joined Dutch club SV Nootdorp. Six months later, in April 2020, it was announced that he would join Westlandia for the 2020–21 season.

After two years at Westlandia, Çakmak moved to TAC '90 in the Sunday Eerste Klasse and later played for BMT. He will join VUC from summer 2026.

== Career statistics ==
As of 4 March 2015

Club performance			League		Cup		Continental		Other		Total	
Season	Club	League	Apps	Goals	Apps	Goals	Apps	Goals	Apps	Goals	Apps	Goals
Turkey			League		Turkish Cup		Europe^{1}		Other^{2}		Total	
2014–15	Trabzonspor	Süper Lig	0	0	0	0	0	0	–		0	0
Netherlands			League		KNVB Cup		Europe^{1}		Other^{2}		Total	
2014–15	Ajax Zaterdag	Topklasse	3	0	1	0	–		–		4	0
Turkey			League		Turkish Cup		Europe^{1}		Other^{2}		Total	
2014–15	Bayrampaşaspor	TFF Second League	4	0	–		–		–		4	0
Career total			7	0	1	0	0	0	0	0	8	0

^{1} Includes UEFA Champions League, UEFA Europa League matches.

^{2} Includes Johan Cruijff Shield matches.
