= Sem van Duijn =

Dutch footballer (born 2004)

Personal information
- Date of birth: 18 March 2004 (age 22)
- Place of birth: Leiden, Netherlands
- Height: 1.81 m (5 ft 11 in)
- Position: Forward

Team information
- Current team: Utrecht (on loan from AZ)
- Number: 17

Youth career
- –2012: Valken '68
- 2012–2016: Quick Boys
- 2016–2019: Sparta Rotterdam
- 2019–2021: Quick Boys

Senior career*
Years	Team	Apps	(Gls)
2021–2024	Quick Boys	64	(19)
2024–2026	Jong AZ	44	(15)
2025–	AZ	0	(0)
2026	→ Telstar (loan)	14	(5)
2026–	→ Utrecht (loan)	9	(2)
- * Club domestic league appearances and goals as of 22:02, 18 October 2026 (UTC)

Sem van Duijn (born 18 March 2004) is a Dutch professional footballer who plays as a forward for Eredivisie club Utrecht, on loan from AZ.

== Early life and youth career ==
Van Duijn was born on 18 March 2004 in Leiden. He grew up in Katwijk, in a family with deep ties to the local amateur club Quick Boys: his grandfather Floor van Duijn Sr. was one of the first players from Quick Boys to be capped as an amateur international, his uncle Floor van Duijn Jr. played for the club's first team in the 1990s, and his father played for several years in the reserve side and made occasional first-team appearances. He himself began playing at the amateur club Valken '68 and joined the Quick Boys youth academy at the age of eight.

He was scouted by Eredivisie club Sparta Rotterdam in the 2016–17 season and spent three seasons in their academy before returning to Quick Boys in 2019. In July 2021, aged seventeen, he signed his first contract with the senior team, a two-year deal with the option of a further year.

== Club career ==
=== Quick Boys ===
Van Duijn made his senior debut for Quick Boys in the Tweede Divisie on 21 August 2021, in a 1–0 home defeat to Kozakken Boys.

He came to wider attention during the 2023–24 KNVB Cup. Quick Boys, then second in the Tweede Divisie, beat Eerste Divisie club NAC Breda 1–0 in the first round at Sportpark Nieuw Zuid on 31 October 2023. In the second round, on 19 December, Van Duijn scored both goals as Quick Boys eliminated De Graafschap 2–0; he opened the scoring after 28 minutes following a through-ball from Ravelino Junte and added a second on the counter-attack from a Tyrone Owusu cross fifteen minutes from time. In the round of 16 on 16 January 2024, away to Eredivisie club AZ, he equalised in the 113th minute to make it 3–3 and force a penalty shoot-out, which Quick Boys lost 4–2.

=== AZ ===
On 13 March 2024, AZ announced the signing of Van Duijn ahead of the 2024–25 season, with media reporting that Fortuna Sittard, Groningen and Utrecht had also been interested. He signed his first professional contract, running until mid-2027, on 20 March 2024. AZ initially intended him as a player for the reserve team Jong AZ, and whereas at Quick Boys he had operated as a winger, in Alkmaar he was used primarily as a centre-forward.

Van Duijn made his Jong AZ debut in the Eerste Divisie on 12 August 2024 in a 6–1 home win over Roda JC, coming on as a 74th-minute substitute for Jayden Addai. He made his senior debut for AZ on 13 February 2025 as a late substitute in a Europa League knockout-phase first leg against Galatasaray, which AZ won 4–1. He made one further first-team appearance that season, as a substitute against Tottenham Hotspur. He spent the rest of the 2024–25 season with Jong AZ, scoring six goals in 22 league matches.

Under new manager Maarten Martens, Van Duijn did not feature in the AZ first team during the first half of the 2025–26 season, scoring nine goals in 21 matches for Jong AZ.

==== Loan to Telstar ====
On 26 January 2026, Van Duijn joined Eredivisie club Telstar on loan for the remainder of the 2025–26 season, without an option to buy. Manager Anthony Correia, who had managed rivals Katwijk during Van Duijn's time at Quick Boys, said he had previously tried to sign him to Telstar.

He made his first start for Telstar on 15 February 2026 at home to Twente, opening the scoring after seventeen minutes in a 1–1 draw. He scored in successive Eredivisie matches over the following weeks, including both goals in a 4–1 home win over Sparta Rotterdam on 22 April 2026, after which the ESPN analysts Hans Kraay Jr. and Gert Kruys singled him out for praise. The win was part of a five-goal run from mid-February 2026 surpassed in the Dutch top flight in that period only by Ayase Ueda of Feyenoord and Ricardo Pepi of PSV. A regular during his half season at Telstar, Van Duijn scored five goals in 14 league appearances, helping the club secure survival on the final matchday.

Van Duijn returned to AZ in the summer of 2026 and signed a contract extension on 14 July, running until the summer of 2031. The club broke open a deal that had been due to expire in 2027.

==== Loan to Utrecht ====
On 28 August 2026, AZ loaned Van Duijn to fellow Eredivisie club Utrecht for the season, with an option to buy. The move reunited him with Anthony Correia, who had managed him at Telstar and had taken charge at Utrecht that summer. Telstar had said earlier in the month that they hoped to sign him on loan again.

== Style of play ==
Van Duijn is a forward. He played mainly as a winger at Quick Boys, and has been used primarily as a centre-forward since joining AZ in 2024. After joining Telstar on loan in January 2026, he became known for his long throw-ins, which the club adopted as an attacking set piece; Kay Tejan's goal in a 3–1 home win over PSV came directly from one. Van Duijn told NH Nieuws he had taken up specific weight-room work to extend his throwing distance.

After Telstar's 4–1 home win over Sparta Rotterdam in April 2026, the ESPN analyst Hans Kraay Jr. compared Van Duijn's off-the-ball movement to that of Roy Makaay, citing his runs in behind and his tendency to run directly at defenders; his fellow analyst Gert Kruys praised Van Duijn's composure in front of goal.

== Career statistics ==
As of match played 18 October 2026

Appearances and goals by club, season and competition
Club	Season	League			KNVB Cup		Europe		Other		Total	
Club	Season	Division	Apps	Goals	Apps	Goals	Apps	Goals	Apps	Goals	Apps	Goals
Quick Boys	2021–22	Tweede Divisie	17	0	1	0	—		—		18	0
Quick Boys	2022–23	Tweede Divisie	13	3	1	0	—		—		14	3
Quick Boys	2023–24	Tweede Divisie	34	16	4	4	—		—		38	20
Quick Boys	Total		64	19	6	4	—		—		70	23
Jong AZ	2024–25	Eerste Divisie	22	6	—		—		—		22	6
Jong AZ	2025–26	Eerste Divisie	21	9	—		—		—		21	9
Jong AZ	2026–27	Eerste Divisie	1	0	—		—		—		1	0
Jong AZ	Total		44	15	—		—		—		44	15
AZ	2024–25	Eredivisie	0	0	0	0	2 (Note: Appearances in UEFA Europa League)	0	0	0	2	0
Telstar (loan)	2025–26	Eredivisie	14	5	2	0	—		—		16	5
Utrecht (loan)	2026–27	Eredivisie	6	0	0	0	—		—		6	0
Career total			128	39	8	4	2	0	0	0	138	43
