= Nivo Sparta =

Dutch football club

- Full name: Na Inspanning Volgt Ontspanning Sparta
- Nickname(s): Spartanen (Spartans)
- Founded: 5 October 1953
- Ground: Eurosportpark, Zaltbommel
- Chairman: Jo van Liempt
- Manager: Theo de Boon
- League: Eerste Klasse Saturday C (2021–22)
- Website: http://www.nivo-sparta.nl/
Home colours

Na Inspanning Volgt Ontspanning Sparta, commonly known as Nivo Sparta, is a football club from Zaltbommel, Netherlands. The club was founded in 1953. In 2019 it returned to the Eerste Klasse after winning a section championship in the Tweede Klasse. It had previous played in the Eerste Klasse 2005 to 2014, parsed with three years (one year and two years) in the Hoofdklasse.
