= VV Noordscheschut =

- Full name: Voetbal Vereniging Noordscheschut
- Nickname(s): De Schutters [The Shooters]
- Founded: 10 September 1945; 79 years ago
- Ground: Sportpark De Meulewieke; Noordscheschut, Netherlands
- Chairman: Paul Volbeda
- Manager: Berry Zandink (2022–)
- League: Tweede Klasse
Home colors

VV Noordscheschut is a Dutch association football club from Noordscheschut, Netherlands. Its home ground is Sportpark De Meulewieke. The club colors are blue-white.

== History ==
=== 20th century: Foundation through Tweede Klasse ===
VV Noordscheschut was founded on 10 September 1945.

In 1977, while playing in the Vierde Klasse, Noordscheschut caused an upset in the Saturday Football Cup when it beat Oranje Nassau Almelo that played 3 tiers higher, 3–2. It won section championships in the Vierde Klasse in 1969, 1981, and 1994.

Noordscheschut won section championships in the Derde Klasse in 1982 and 1996. The championship of 1982 was exceptional as the section's runner-up, CVSC from Coevorden, had made a bogus report to Noorderschut that it had just lost its last game 0–1 against league closers De Fivel (while it really won 4–0), creating the false impression that Noordscheschut was already section champion. Noordscheschut nevertheless gave its rival that Saturday a fight, beating SJS Stadskanaal 2–0 and kept CVSC in second position.

=== 21st century: Between Tweede Klasse and Hoofdklasse ===
In 2004, Eric Prins became the manager of a relatively strong squad. In his first season, Noordscheschut promoted for the first time to the Eerste Klasse, from a runner-up spot in the Tweede Klasse. Over the next years, Noordschschut played mostly Eerste Klasse and Eric Klasse became manager for ten consecutive years, a rarity in Dutch soccer. In 2008 Noordschschut was runner-up in the Eerste Klasse. In 2011 Noordscheschut relegated to the Tweede and in 2012 immediately bounced back with its only section championships in the Tweede to date. It also spent 2014–2017 back in the Tweede, twice failing to promote from the runner-up position then promoting in 2017 through playoffs from the modest 7th slot.

In 2018 VV Noordseschut won the award for most sustainable football club in the province of Drenthe. In 2020, Noordscheschut promoted for the first time to the Hoofdklasse from a first place in its Eerste Klasse section. Due to the COVID-19 pandemic in the Netherlands, the previous season had been cut off without championships and automatic promotions, yet Noordscheschut could promote after the number of clubs in the leagues above was increased. By 2023–24 Noordscheschut plays back in the Tweede Klasse, after two consecutive deregulations.

== Associated people ==
=== Head coach ===
- Jan Klaassens (1982 or earlier–1987)
- Kees Nienhuis (1987–1989)
- Bert Bruinenberg (1989–1993)
- Lammert Klouwen (1993–1996)
- Gerard Hofstede (1996–1997)
- Riekes Eikens (interim, 1997)
- Roel Smand (1997–1999)
- Jan Klaassens (1999–2002)
- Bert Bosman (2002–2004)
- Eric Prins (2004–2014)
- Otto Halmingh (2014–2015)
- Jan Piet Bosma (interim, 2015)
- André Mulder (2015–2018)
- Marc van Meel (2018–2022)
- Berry Zandink (2022–)
