= Ismaïl Yıldırım =

Dutch footballer

Personal information
- Full name: Ismaïl Yıldırım
- Date of birth: 1 June 1990 (age 36)
- Place of birth: Dordrecht, Netherlands
- Height: 1.77 m (5 ft 9 1/2 in)
- Position: Winger

Youth career
- –2004?: DFC Dordrecht
- 2004?–2008?: FC Dordrecht

Senior career*
Years	Team	Apps	(Gls)
2008?–2011	SV Oranje Wit		
2011–2014	Kozakken Boys	56	(16)
2014–2016	RKC Waalwijk	41	(4)
2016–2017	Boluspor	6	(0)
2017	Menemen Belediyespor	0	(0)
2017–2021	ASWH	104	(22)
2021–2022	VV Capelle		
2023–	GSC/ODS		
- * Club domestic league appearances and goals as of 29 May 2024

Ismaïl Yıldırım (born 1 June 1990) is a Dutch professional footballer who currently plays as a winger for VV Capelle in the Dutch Vierde Divisie. He formerly played for Boluspor, Kozakken Boys, RKC Waalwijk, and ASWH.

== Football career ==
=== Youth, Oranje Wit and Kozakken ===
Yıldırım played in the youth academy of FC Dordrecht, after being scouted at the local DFC. From FC Dordrecht he continued to SV Oranje Wit. In 2011, the right winger moved to Kozakken Boys, where he would play for three years.

=== RKC Waalwijk and Turkey ===
In 2014 he was taken over by RKC Waalwijk. He made his debut for Waalwijk on 8 August 2014, when he lost 3–2 to the peer relegated club, Roda JC. Yıldırım was replaced nine minutes before time by Philippe van Arnhem. In March 2015, the winger extended his contract with RKC for one season and an option for another year.

In the summer of 2016, Yıldırım made the move to Turkish Boluspor, where he signed a two-year contract. In February 2017, his contract was terminated. In June 2017, he signed a one-year contract with Menemen Belediyespor.

=== ASWH, Capelle and GSC/ODS ===
In August 2017 Yildirim joined ASWH. He announced his intention to leave the club in the summer of 2020. A month later he decided to continue playing at ASWH. In the summer of 2021, Yildirim left ASWH.

In June 2021, Yildirim signed with then Vierde Divisie-side VV Capelle. After one season Yildirim left Capelle. In January 2023 he joined Dordrecht side-GSC/ODS. In 2024, he won a Derde Klasse section championship with GSC/ODS.
