= Ahmet Kiliç =

Dutch footballer

Personal information
- Date of birth: 20 March 1984 (age 42)
- Place of birth: Ede, Netherlands
- Position: Midfielder

Youth career
- Edesche Boys
- DTS '35
- 1996–2003: Vitesse

Senior career*
Years	Team	Apps	(Gls)
2003–2007	AGOVV	86	(3)
2007–2008	Yeni Kırşehirspor	15	(0)
2008–2012	De Treffers		
2012–2014	Bennekom		
2014–2017	Jeugd '90		
2018–2019	WAVV		
2019–	Jeugd '90		

Managerial career
- 2014–2017: Jeugd '90
- * Club domestic league appearances and goals

Ahmet Kiliç (born 20 March 1984) is a Dutch footballer who plays for Jeugd '90 in the Derde Klasse.

== Career ==
=== Professional ===
Kiliç played in the youth of Edesche Boys, DTS '35 and Vitesse, and made his debut on 7 November 2003 for AGOVV. He made his professional debut in the match against Fortuna Sittard, which was won 1–4 by AGOVV. He came on for Koen Garritsen in the 86th minute. In 2007 he joined Yeni Kırşehirspor in Turkey. There, he was not paid his salary and he returned to the Netherlands in early-2008 and where he applied for a status as a free agent and financial compensation through the court.

=== Lower level ===
Kiliç continued his career with amateur club De Treffers. In 2013, he joined Bennekom and from the 2014–15 season he also started managing FC Jeugd '90. In 2015, his career as a player at Bennekom came to an end after he was suspended for 18 months in September 2014 after participating in a brawl against opponent SV Huizen. In 2017, Kiliç had to end his coaching duties at Jeugd '90 because he did not have the required coaching diplomas. He continued in 2018 as a player at WAVV and from 2019 returned to Jeugd '90.
