= VV Monnickendam =

Dutch football club

- Full name: Voetbalvereniging Monnickendam
- Nickname(s): Green-White Lions
- Founded: 18 September 1930
- Stadium: Sportpark Markgouw
- League: Eerste Klasse Saturday (2020/21)
Home colours

Voetbalveriging Monnickendam (Football Club Monnickendam) is a football club from Monnickendam, Netherlands. The club kit consists of green shirts, white pants and white socks, hence it nickname "Green-White Lions". It stages more than 25 teams. Homebase is Sportpark Markgouw, on the Cornelis Dirkzoonlaan.

== History ==
VV Monnickendam was founded on 18 September 1930 and is the only field football club in town. At foundation, VV Monnickendam had access to one field; a site in Overleek on the Overlekergouw. After the period at the Overlekerveld, VV Monnickendam was also given access to a field on the Marijkestraat.

On 4 May 1960 VV Monnickendam received a royal warrant of appointment. Around 1970, Monnickendam transitioned to Sportpark Markgouw, where it has five standard fields and one practice field that are rented from the municipality.

On 2 December 1979, a player for VV Monnickendam hit a referee unconscious. The player was banned for life from football. During the 1981–82 season, the wooden building was converted into the current brick canteen and changing rooms. As the number of members decreased and the athletics club needed accommodation, the football club had to give up two fields

From 2000 to 2005, the Saturday first squad played in the Derde Klasse. From 2005 to 2019 it played in the Tweede Klasse, with the exception of 2016–2017. In 2009 the club stopped playing on Sundays. From 2019 the Saturday first squad plays in the Eerste Klasse. In the summer of 2021, coach Looijen replaces reting coach Persijn.
