= RKVV Brabantia =

Dutch football club

- Full name: Rooms-Katholieke Voetbalvereniging Brabantia
- Founded: 1 March 1922
- Ground: Sportpark Strijp, Eindhoven
- League: Eerste Klasse Sunday C (2019–20)
- Website: http://www.vvbrabantia.nl/
Home colours

RKVV Brabantia is a football club from Eindhoven, Netherlands. RKVV Brabantia plays in the 2017–18 Sunday Eerste Klasse C.

In the season 1954/55 RKVV Brabantia played 1 year of professional football in the Eerste Klasse, which can be compared to the Eredivisie nowadays. For financial reasons they were the first club to return to the amateur ranks after that season.

Prior to that, when the sport was still fully amateur based, RKVV Brabantia had some great successes in the mid-1930s. In those days there were still several football associations. One of them was the RKF/IVCB, only for clubs with a Roman Catholic background and the second largest association on national level after the (Koninklijke) Nederlandse Voetbalbond. In 1935/36 and 1936/37 RKVV Brabantia became twice national champions.
