= SV TOP =

Dutch football club

- Full name: Sportvereniging Tot Ons Plezier
- Founded: 9 April 1928
- Ground: Sportpark Tijenraan, Oss
- League: Eerste Klasse Sunday C (2019–20)
- Website: http://www.svtop.nl/
Home colours

SV TOP is a football club from Oss, Netherlands. SV TOP plays in the 2017–18 Sunday Eerste Klasse C.

== History ==
TOP had a short spell in professional football from 1955 until 1957. First 1 year in the Eerste Klasse, which can be compared to the Eerste Divisie nowadays, and 1 year in the Tweede Divisie before voluntary rejoining the amateur ranks.

In 1986 the club became Sunday amateur champions and in 1991 the club became pro again in a separate organization.

The professional branch was renamed into TOP Oss in 1994 and renamed once again into FC Oss in 2009. For more details see FC Oss.

As a result of going professional, the amateur branch, still known as SV TOP, was mandatory relegated to the Vierde Klasse. After several promotions they reached the Hoofdklasse again in 1997. Right now it plays in the Eerste Klasse
