= VV VKW =

Association football club in Westerbork, Netherlands

VKW
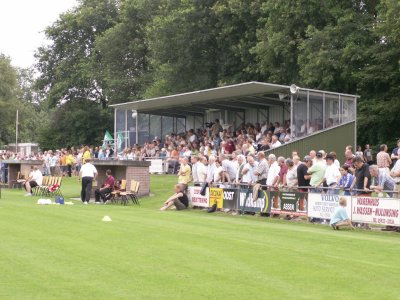
- Full name: Voetbalvereniging Vlugheid Kracht Westerbork
- Founded: 8 August 1929; 95 years ago
- Ground: Sportpark De Perkenslag; Westerbork
- Chairman: Hilco Zeewuster
- Manager: Bernd van Bolhuis
- League: Eerste Klasse
- 2022–23: Sunday Vierde Divisie A, 16th of 16 (relegated)
- Website: https://www.vkwvoetbal.nl/
colours	colours

Voetbalvereniging Vlugheid Kracht Westerbork (VKW) is a football club based in Westerbork, Drenthe, Netherlands. It was founded on 8 August 1929. In 2022, they reached promotion to the Vierde Divisie (when they secured promotion it was still known as the Hoofdklasse). They suffered relegation back to the Eerste Klasse after their sole season in the Vierde Divisie.
