= Valken '68 =

- Founded: 1968
- Ground: Sportpark 't Duyfrak
- Manager: Alan Campfens
colours

Valken '68 is a Dutch football club from Valkenburg, South Holland. It was founded in 1968 and plays its home games at Sportpark 't Duyfrak. The colors of Valken '68 are red-yellow, which are the colors of Valkenburg. The first squad plays in the Eerste Klasse Saturday since 2020. With 600 active members, Valken '68 is the smallest of the Katwijk municipality's five football clubs after Quick Boys, Rijnsburgse Boys, VV Katwijk and FC Rijnvogels.

== History ==
After the discontinuation of Valken Boys in the 1950s, a new football club for the village of Valkenburg was founded in 1968. It played for a while at the KRV grounds in Katwijk aan den Rijn, then a football field on the Zonneveldslaan in Valkenburg became the ground of Valken '68. Sportpark 't Duyfrak was opened in 1974.

Until 1996, the first squad played in the Vierde Klasse or outside the main KNVB league system. Since 1996 it hovers between the Derde, Tweede and Eerste Klasse. Since 2012 only between the Tweede and Eerste.

The football club has a covered grandstand from 2005, while the first two synthetic turf pitches were installed three years later. A third synthetic turf pitch was realized in 2015.

In 2018, Valken '68 was crushed 7–0 by SV Honselersdijk in the Tweede Klasse playoffs for promoting to the Eerste Klasse. Valken '68 promoted in 2020 without playoffs, as the COVID-19 pandemic in the Netherlands was already ongoing.

== Associated people ==
=== Coaches ===
- Alan Campfens (since 2019)

=== Notable players ===
- Selmo Kurbegović (2018–2019)
