= VV Nieuw-Lekkerland =

Dutch football club

- Full name: Voetbalvereniging Nieuw-Lekkerland
- Nickname(s): White Devils
- Founded: 21 April 1932
- Ground: Excelsior, Nieuw-Lekkerland
- Chairman: Wim den Ouden
- Manager: Ronald Hulsbosch
- League: Eerste Klasse Saturday C (2019–20)
- Website: http://www.vvnieuwlekkerland.nl/
Home colours

Voetbalvereniging Nieuw-Lekkerland is an association football club from Nieuw-Lekkerland, Netherlands. The club was founded in 1932. It plays in Saturday Eerste Klasse South since relegating from Saturday Hoofdklasse B in 2013.

== History ==
The club was founded and joined the CNVB leagues as Excelsior. When the CNVB merged into the KNVB, Excelsior was not an option as other clubs used Excelsior. The club's name was shortened to VVE or VVE Nieuw-Lekkerland, where VVE abbreviates VV Excelsior. Eventually the club settled for VV Nieuw-Lekkerland, commonly abbreviated to Nieuw-Lekkerland, which is the name of the town.

In the 1984–85 KNVB Cup Nieuw-Lekkerland played against PEC Zwolle in the first round. PEC Zwolle was playing in the Eredivisie, yet the game in Nieuw-Lekkerland ended in an astonishing tie: 3–3. In the replay, played in Zwolle, Nieuw-Lekkerland was defeated 3–1.

After the 2016–17 Eerste Klasse season, in which the first squad nearly relegated to the Tweede Klasse, 4 players left Nieuw-Lekkerland: Ruud Ouweneel (captain until departure), Ard Hartman, Raymon Slagboom and Ruben Munoz.
