= Vv ZOB =

vv ZOB
- Full name: Voetbalvereniging Zuidoostbeemster
- Founded: 1 July 1956
- Ground: Zuidoosterpark, Zuidoostbeemster, Netherlands
- Manager: Mohad Zaoudi
- League: Eerste Klasse
- Website: vvzob.nl
colors

vv ZOB, short for Voetbalvereniging Zuidoostbeemster, is a Dutch football club from Zuidoostbeemster. Since 2019, vv ZOB plays in the Eerste Klasse Saturday.

== History ==
ZOB was founded on 1 July 1956. In 1969 it joined KNVB's Vierde Klasse. In 1976 and 1977, it won section championships bringing it to the Tweede Klasse, a climb of two leagues in two years. In the 1980s and 1990s ZOB hovered between the Tweede and Derde Klasse. This situation ended in 1996 when it promoted to the Tweede for the third time.

In 2000–01, ZOB played one season in the Eerste Klasse. From 2001 to 2019, it played 18 consecutive season in the Tweede Klasse. In 2019, ZOB won the second trimester in the Tweede Klasse. Through the subsequent playoffs it returned to the Eerste Klasse.

== Chief coaches ==
- Mohad Zaoudi (since 2015)
