= Amsterdam Gençler Birliği =

Dutch football club

Coordinates: 52°22′19″N 4°47′56″E

AGB
- Full name: Amsterdam Gençler Birliği
- Founded: 27 May 1982; 43 years ago
- Ground: Sportpark Ookmeer, Amsterdam, Netherlands
- League: Eerste Klasse A (West 1) (2024–25)
- Website: http://www.agbonline.nl/
Home colours

AGB is a Dutch amateur football club based in Amsterdam Nieuw-West, founded on 27 May 1982, the team play their home matches at the Sportpark Ookmeer.

== History ==
AGB stands for Amsterdam Gençler Birliği, which is Turkish for Amsterdam Youth Union an amateur Dutch football club which was founded by Turkish immigrants in the Netherlands. AGB started the 2013–14 season fielding both a Saturday and a Sunday squad, playing in the Derde Klasse and Vierde Klasse of the KNVB district West-I respectively. While the Saturday squad competing in the Derde Klasse withdrew from competition midway through the season.
