= VV Geldrop =

Dutch football club

- Full name: Voetbalvereniging Geldrop
- Founded: 5 May 1926
- Ground: Sportpark De Kievit, Geldrop
- League: Eerste Klasse Sunday D (2019–20)
- Website: http://www.vvgeldrop.nl/
Home colours

VV Geldrop is a football club from Geldrop, Netherlands. VV Geldrop plays in the 2017–18 Sunday Eerste Klasse D.

From the late 1970s up to the early 2000s the club played continuously in the Hoofdklasse, at that time the highest amateur league. In 1984, 1987 and 1990 they even became overall amateur champions.
