= SV Nootdorp =

Dutch football club

- Full name: Sportvereniging Nootdorp
- Founded: 12 January 1950
- Ground: Sportpark 's-Gravenhout, Nootdorp
- League: Eerste Klasse Saturday A (2020–21)
- Website: http://www.svnootdorp.nl/
Home colours

SV Nootdorp is a football club from Nootdorp, Netherlands. SV Nootdorp plays in Saturday Eerste Klasse since 2019. The home games are played at “Sportpark 's-Gravenhout”.

== History ==
=== 20th century ===
SV Nootdorp was founded on 12 January 1950. Nootdorp already had two football clubs, VV Oliveo and RKDEO.

In 1960 and 1973, Nootdorp won a third class section championships of the Haarlemsche Voetbalbond (HVB). In 1979 and 1983 Nootdorp won the first class sections of the HVB. In 1984 it won the Big League of HVB and joined the KNVB Vierde Klasse.

Nootdorp won Vierde Klasse championships in 1995 and 1999. In between, in 1998, Nootdorp was booted from the KNVB District Cup by VV Moordrecht 2–1, after a second round extension.

=== 21st century ===
In 2000, Nootdorp won its first and only championship in the Derde Klasse, promoting Nootdorp to the Tweede Klasse. It was the second championship and promotion in row.

In 2010, SV Nootdorp promoted to the Eerste Klasse from a runner-up position, after playoffs. In 2017, it promoted to the Hoofdklasse, again from playoffs Nootdorp's high point came in 2017 when it reached the 12th spot in the Hoofdklasse. The Hoofdklasse wasn't easy on the club. For example, it lost 0–1 to a much stronger VV Noordwijk, after Nootdorp had played defense the entire game. In 2019 Nootdorp relegated back to the Eerste Klasse.

== Notable players ==
- Serhat Çakmak (2019–2020)
- Jens Raven (2021-2022)
