= VV De Bataven =

Dutch football club

- Full name: Voetbalvereniging De Bataven
- Founded: 27 March 1932
- Ground: Sportpark Walburgen, Gendt
- Manager: Charles Kazlauskas
- League: Eerste Klasse Sunday E (2019–20)
- Website: http://www.bataven.nl/
Home colours

Voetbalvereniging De Bataven is a football club from Gendt, Netherlands. VV De Bataven plays in the 2017–18 Sunday Hoofdklasse A.
