= DTS Ede =

Coordinates: 52°2′11.45″N 5°38′1.36″E

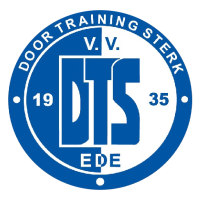
- Full name: Door Training Sterk Ede
- Founded: 12 March 1935
- Ground: Sportpark Inschoten, Ede
- Capacity: 216
- Chairman: Jeroen Been
- Manager: Eric Speelziek (men); Andrew Thomas (women)
- League: Eerste Klasse (men); Topklasse (women)
- Website: https://www.dtsede.nl
Home colours	Away colours

DTS Ede (Door Training Sterk Ede) is a Dutch amateur football club based in Ede, Gelderland, Netherlands. The club was founded on 12 March 1935. Its home ground is Sportpark Inschoten. The club colours are blue and white. Until the 2010–11 season, the club was known as DTS '35.

DTS Ede maintains a cooperation agreement with professional club SBV Vitesse.

== History ==
=== Foundation and early years (1935–1950) ===
DTS '35 was founded in 1935 in Ede. In its early years, the club played matches on fields located behind the cultural centre De Reehorst, which at the time was owned by the Algemene Kunstzijde Unie. The club gradually established itself within regional Saturday amateur football.

=== Growth and relocation (1950–1980) ===
During the 1950s and 1960s, DTS expanded its activities and played at several locations in and around Ede. The development of the sports complex at Klaphekweg provided the club with a more permanent home and supported further growth in membership and organisation.

=== Sportpark Inschoten (1981–present) ===
In 1981, DTS relocated to the newly developed Sportpark Inschoten, where it continues to play today. Since then, the club has grown into one of the most prominent amateur football clubs in the region.

=== Competitive record ===
Over the decades, DTS has competed in various levels of the Dutch amateur football system, including the Hoofdklasse (now part of the Vierde Divisie) and the Eerste Klasse. The club has been considered a stable presence within the higher levels of Dutch amateur football.

== Youth academy ==
The youth department includes teams from Under-8 through Under-23 levels and provides football for both boys and girls.

The highest youth teams compete at divisional level within competitions organised by the Royal Dutch Football Association (KNVB). The club employs licensed coaches and offers specialist goalkeeper and technical training. Video analysis is used for selected teams.

=== Youth tournaments ===
DTS Ede annually organises two major youth tournaments at Sportpark Inschoten:

- International U13 Tournament – traditionally held on Easter Monday. The 2025 edition marked the 58th staging of the event. Participating clubs have included youth teams from professional organisations in the Netherlands, Belgium and Germany, such as PEC Zwolle, FC Groningen, SC Cambuur, KV Kortrijk, KVC Westerlo, Fortuna Düsseldorf and Rot-Weiss Essen.
- U15 Tournament – first held in 2003 and staged for the 22nd time in 2025.

== Men's team ==
=== First team ===
The men's first team competes in the Eerste Klasse Saturday division (2025–26 season).

The club has achieved multiple promotions between the Tweede Klasse, Eerste Klasse and Hoofdklasse levels. It won the Eerste Klasse championship in the 2011–12 season.

=== Honours ===
- Eerste Klasse champions: 2011–12
- Tweede Klasse champions: 1980–81, 1999–2000, 2007–08
- Derde Klasse champions: 1968–69, 1978–79, 1990–91, 2005–06
- Vierde Klasse champions: 1955–56, 1956–57, 1960–61, 1963–64

=== Notable former players ===
- Hicham Haouat
- Shutlan Axwijk
- Ahmet Kiliç
- Shapoul Ali

== Women's team ==
=== First team ===
The women's first team competes in the Topklasse, the highest amateur level below the Eredivisie.

The team was promoted to the Topklasse in the 2011–12 season and has since remained a consistent competitor at that level. The club won the Topklasse championship in 2016, 2019 and 2025.

=== Notable former players ===
- Sylvia Smit
- Renate Verhoeven
- Lydia Borg
- Marianne van Brummelen
- Jorie Schepers

== Ground ==
DTS Ede plays its home matches at Sportpark Inschoten in Ede. The complex includes seven full-size pitches (three artificial turf and four natural grass) and three smaller youth pitches. The main field features a covered stand with approximately 216 seats.
