= SV Argon =

Dutch football and basketball club

Argon
- Full name: Sport Vereniging Argon
- Founded: 1971
- Ground: Sportpark Argon; Mijdrecht, De Ronde Venen
- Capacity: 3,500
- League: Eerste Klasse Saturday A (2019–20)
Home colours	Away colours

Sport Vereniging Argon is a football and basketball club from Mijdrecht, Netherlands. Its male first football squad plays in the Hoofdklasse.

== History ==
=== 20th century ===
The club was founded in 1971 as a merger of RKSV Stormvogels, VV Mijdrecht, and SV Midreth.

In 1995 it won the national cup for amateurs, the district cup West I, and the Super Cup for amateurs. In 1999 it won the section championship of Hoofdklasse A.

=== 21st century ===
In 2005 it won the section championship of Hoofdklasse A and the general Saturday championship. In 2007 it was national champion for amateurs, general Saturday champion, section champion in Hoofdklasse A, and the Super Cup winner for amateurs.

Argon lost 3–0 in the second round of the 2007–08 KNVB Cup against SC Heerenveen.

In 2013 it won the National Cup for amateurs and the District Cup West I. That year it dismantled its first Sunday squad that was about to go to the Eerste Klasse after it had completed a 2 years run in the Topklasse, just one year earlier.

In 2017 Argon was joined by Mohammed Bouabgha. Rabobank sponsored until 2019. In the 2020–21 season the club is sponsored by Liquid Rubber.
