= SV Oranje Wit =

Dutch sports club

Sportvereniging Oranje Wit is a sports club from Dordrecht, Netherlands. It has sections for pool, tennis and association football. Its first male squad plays in the Saturday Eerste klasse since 2014. Home ground is Sportcomplex Stadpolders.

== History ==
Oranje Wit was founded as the Christelijke Sportvereniging Oranje Wit (CSV Oranje Wit) by members of the Christelijke Jonge Mannen Vereniging (CJMV), on 2 May 1925. As CSV for lack equipment or priority did not engage in korfball, the foundation of the Christelijke Korfbal Vereniging Oranje Wit followed in 1926.

The club first joined Christian leagues. In 1943 and in 1946 the first squad won section champions in the Vierde Klasse (K)NVB. In 1977, 1986, and 1999, it won championships in the Derde Klasse, and in 1988 and 2002 in the Tweede Klasse.

Pippy Premboom coached the first male squad from 2010. In 2013–2014 Oranje Wit had its first and thus far only stint in the Hoofdklasse, after winning its first and only Eerste Klasse championship. Faysal Wahabi replaced Premboom in 2019.

== Former players ==
- Noël Goossens – from youth in Oranje Wit, continued to FC Dordrecht, SteDoCo, and Ido's Football Club
- Mischa Rook – from youth in Oranje Wit, continued to FC Dordrecht, Cambuur, TOP Oss and Fortuna Sittard
- Ismail Yildirim – from youth in Oranje Wit, continued to RKC Waalwijk, Boluspor, and ASWH
