= Forum Sport =

Dutch football club

- Founded: 1 July 1998; 26 years ago
- Ground: Sportpark 't Loo, Voorburg, Netherlands
- League: Eerste Klasse
colours

Forum Sport is a Dutch football club from Voorburg. Its main squad plays since 2013 in the Eerste Klasse. Homeground is Sportpark 't Loo and its colors are blue.

== History ==
Forum Sport was founded on 1 July 1998 from a merger between DEVJO and SV Voorburg. DEVJO was founded on 15 July 1933, was originally a Christian football club and played on Saturdays. SV Voorburg played on Sundays. Forum Sport stopped Sunday football in 2005.

== Associated people ==
=== Chief coaches ===
Years	Coach
1998–2000	Henny de Klerk
2000–2006	André Lourens
2006–2007	Herman Kooijenga, André Lourens
2007–2011	Stefan Koegler
2011–2012	Wim Eilander, André Lourens
2012–2016	André Lourens
2016–2019	Bas Steffens
Since 2019	Dennis den Turk
