= Noordscheschut =

Human settlement in the Netherlands

- Village
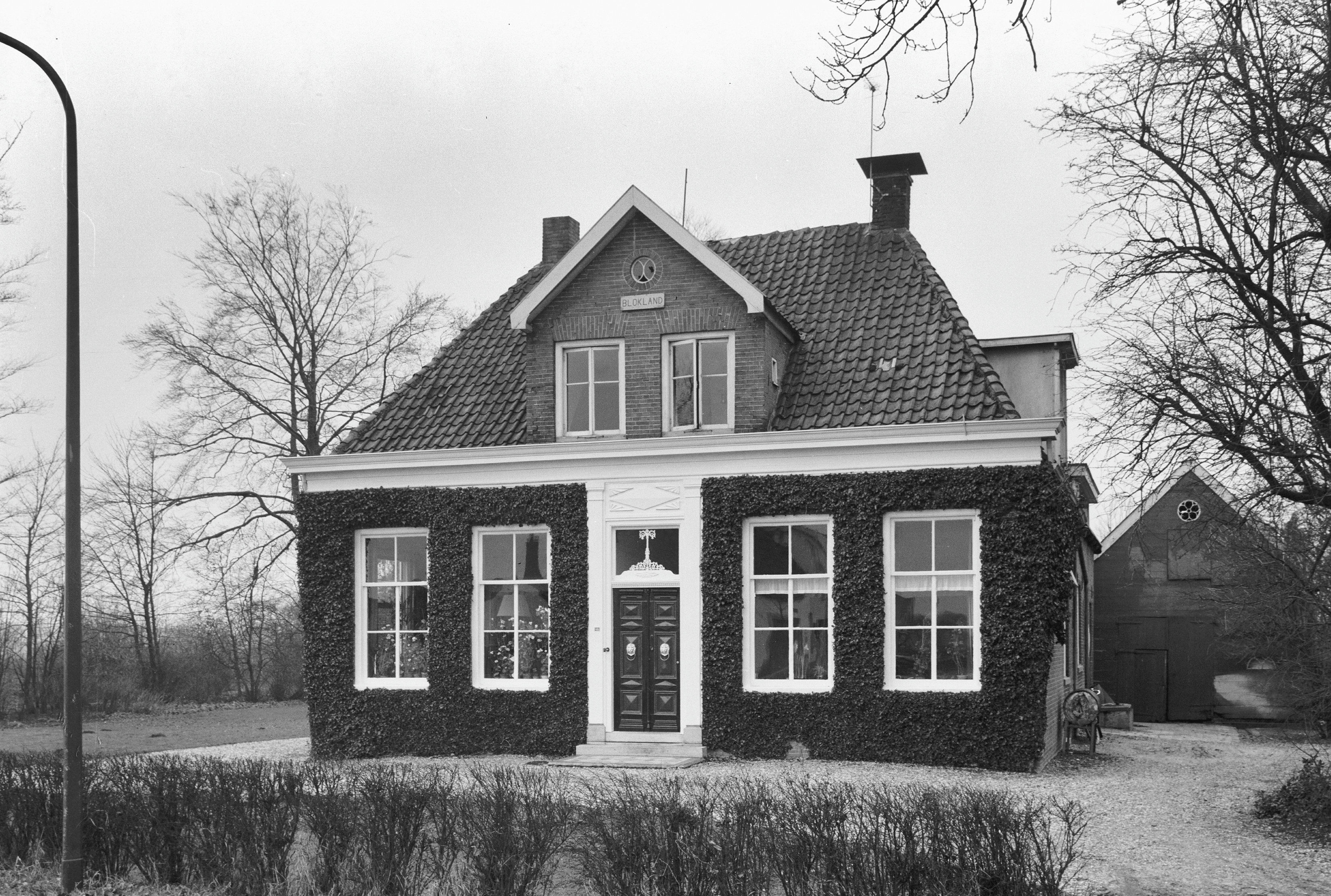
- House in Noordscheschut

- Flag

- Location in province of Drenthe in the Netherlands Noordscheschut (Netherlands)
- Coordinates: 52°43′25″N 6°32′05″E
- Country: Netherlands
- Province: Drenthe
- Municipality: Hoogeveen

Area
  - Total: 4.71 km^{2} (1.82 sq mi)
- Elevation: 12 m (39 ft)

Population (2021)
  - Total: 2,085
  - Density: 443/km^{2} (1,150/sq mi)
- Time zone: UTC+1 (CET)
  - Summer (DST): UTC+2 (CEST)
- Postal code: 7914
- Dialing code: 0528

Noordscheschut is a village in the north of the Netherlands. It is located in the municipality of Hoogeveen, Drenthe.

== History ==
Noordscheschut is a settlement along a canal which developed in the 18th century for peat excavation. It was first mentioned in the 1850s as Noordsche Schut, and means "northern sluice".

In 2020, the local football club, VV Noordscheschut, promoted to the Hoofdklasse.
