= VV Almkerk =

Dutch football club

- Full name: Voetbalvereniging Almkerk
- Founded: 4 October 1945; 79 years ago
- Ground: Sportpark Almkerk, Almkerk
- Chairman: Hans Keller
- Manager: Vincent de Klerk
- League: Eerste Klasse D (South) (2024–25)
Home colours	Away colours

VV Almkerk is an association football club from Almkerk, Netherlands. It was founded on 4 October 1945. Its home ground is Sportpark Almkerk. The first male squad of VV Almkerk plays in Eerste Klasse Saturday South since 2018. Coach is Ad van Seeters, who replaced Robert Roest in the summer of 2019.
