= Oranje Nassau Groningen =

Dutch football club

CVV Oranje Nassau
- Full name: Christelijke Voetbalvereniging Oranje Nassau
- Founded: 30 April 1918
- Ground: Coendersborg, Groningen
- Chairman: Mark Pathuis
- Manager: Erwin Heerlijn
- League: Eerste Klasse Saturday E (2019–20)
- Website: http://www.cvvoranjenassau.nl/
Home colours

Christelijke Voetbalvereniging Oranje Nassau (Christian football club Orange-Nassau) is a football club from Groningen, Netherlands. Its female first and second squad and its male first squad plays in the Eerste Klasse, the men and women's first teams relegated in 2017 from their respective Hoofdklasse leagues.

== History ==
CVV Oranje Nassau was founded on 30 April 1918. Its male first squad initially played in local leagues.

=== 1947–1999: Vierde Klasse to first Eerste Klasse title; Women in Hoofdklasse ===
In 1947 Oranje Nassau joined KNVB's Vierde Klasse, winning section championships in 1956, 1957 and 1958. In 1958 it promoted to the Derde Klasse. Oranje Nassau won a Derde Klasse championship in 1964 and promoted to the Tweede Klasse.

In 1981 Oranje Nassau won a Tweede Klasse championship and promoted to the Eerste Klasse. In 1995–1996 it played one season back in the Tweede Klasse, immediately promoting from only the 6th place. Also in summer 1996, the Oranje Nassau female first squad were first to join the Hoofdklasse. In 1999 the mean won an Eerste Klasse championship but did not promote to the Hoofdklasse.

=== Since 2000: Both genders in top leagues; National cup and title ===
The women won the 2004–05 KNVB Women's Cup, after beating Be Quick '28 5–0 in the cup finals. The team continued to play in various sections of the Hoofdklasse and in the Topklasse until 2017, when it was relegated to the Eerste Klasse. SteDoCo beat the OS women 1–3 in a surprise defeat in Groningen in the opening game of fall 2011. Aruni Slagter scored for Oranje Nassau.

The women's beach football team had won the open national championship in 2016.

The male first squad played between 2003 and 2017 seven seasons in the Hoofdklasse. In 2017 it relegated to Eerste Klasse together with women's team. In the 2017–2018 Eerste Klasse the women's first squad will play alongside the Oranje Nassau's second women's squad.
