= VV Bennekom =

Dutch football club

- Full name: Voetbal Vereniging; Bennekom
- Founded: 29 September 1954
- Ground: Eikelhof; Bennekom
- Capacity: 4,000
- Chairman: Jaap Zomer
- Manager: Cees Look
- League: Eerste Klasse Saturday D (2019–20)
Home colours	Away colours

VV Bennekom is a football club from Bennekom, Netherlands. The club plays in the Saturday Eerste Klasse.

== History ==
The club was founded in 1954, by youth from De Laar, a hamlet just east of Bennekom. The club quickly rose through the ranks of amateur football in the Netherlands, and won promotion to the Hoofdklasse in 1974, just after moving to a new ground in Bennekom itself. In the Hoofdklasse, Bennekom won two league titles, in 1981-82 and in 1987–88, and finished tied on first place in 1980-81 and in 1989–90, losing the decisive match in both cases. The club was relegated to the Eerste Klasse (First Class) in 1991, but secured promotion back to the Hoofdklasse after only one season.

Bennekom won the KNVB District Cup of the district East of the Royal Dutch Football Association in 1998-99 and in 2003–04.

Bennekom defeated professional side TOP Oss in the first round of the KNVB Cup 2003-04. In the second round, Willem II proved too strong.

In 2016 it relegated from the Hoofdklasse to the Eerste Klasse.
