= GRC '14 =

Dutch football club

GRC '14, short for Giessen Rijswijk Combinatie 2014, is an association football club from Giessen, Netherlands. Home games are played at Sportpark Almbos. It plays in the Eerste Klasse.

== History ==
GRC '14 was founded on July 1, 2014, as a merger of VV Giessen (founded 16 July 1963) and Rijswijkse Boys (founded 6 July 1945). Two years later the club made it to the Eerste Klasse Saturday C from 4th position through playoffs. In 2019–2020 it continues to play in the Eerste Klasse, after just barely keeping out of the relegation playoffs.

=== Chief coach ===
- Marcel van Helmond (2014–2018)
- Piet de Kruif (since 2018)
