= SV Honselersdijk =

Dutch football club

- Full name: Sportverenging Honselersdijk
- Founded: 6 May 1964
- Ground: Sportpark de Strijphorst, Honselersdijk, Netherlands
- League: Eerste Klasse
colors

Sportverenging Honselersdijk is a football club from Honselersdijk, Netherlands. Since 2018 it plays in the Eerste Klasse. It plays at Sportpark de Strijphorst in an orange-white-blue kit. The club also has a successful futsal team.

== History ==
=== 20th century ===
Sportvereniging Honselersdijk was founded on 6 May 1964. In 1965–66 it beat the factory team of Van der Heem 12–0.

In 1982 Honselersdijk joined the main leagues of the KNVB, starting in the Vierde Klasse. Until 2018, Honselersdijk hovered between the Vierde, Derde and Tweede Klasse. It won a championship in the Vierde Klasse in 1988 and in the Derde Klasse in 1997.

=== 21st century ===
In 2009–10 Honselersdijk beat VV Marine 9–0 and HSV Celeritas 12–0.

In 2014, Honselersdijk had it biggest victory to-date, beating SC Zuiderpark 18–0 at De Strijphorst. Discontinuing this strike, it lost 0–8 against the first squad of Feyenoord. Feyenoord took on a handicap in this game, not replacing injured players. Eventually Feyenoord played 9 against 11 players.

Since 2018 Honselersdijk plays in the Eerste Klasse, after entering the playoffs from the fourth position. In the second round of the playoffs Honselersdijk crushed Valken '68 7–0.

Honselersdijk obtained fourth place in season one in the Eerste Klasse. Subsequent two seasons were impacted by the COVID-19 pandemic in the Netherlands.
