= Roda '46 =

Dutch football club

Roda '46 (self-styled as RODA '46) is a Dutch football club from Leusden. It was founded on 15 September 1946. The club has Saturday and Sunday football teams. Its Saturday football team plays in 2018–19 in the Eerste Klasse, while its Sunday team plays in the Derde Klasse. Roda's home grounds are at the Buiningpark in Leusden.

With 1,600 members and about 100 teams, Roda '46 is one of the larger clubs in the Amersfoort region. The professional journal De VoetbalTrainer ranked the youth department of Roda in 2017 as belonging top 10 of the Netherlands and #1 in its region. Roda '46 has a collaboration agreement with Vitesse Arnhem.

== History ==
During the preparation for the 2018–19 season, Hoofdklasse-side VV De Meern could barely beat Roda 2–1.
