= BVC '12 =

Dutch football club

- Full name: Beekse Voetbalclub '12
- Founded: 5 May 1912; 113 years ago
- Ground: Sportpark 't Groothuis, Beek
- League: Vijfde Klasse
- Website: www.bvc12.nl
Home colours

Beekse Voetbalclub '12, simply known as BVC '12, is a Dutch football club from Beek, Gelderland, Netherlands. Founded on 5 May 1912, the club takes its name from the village of Beek and the year of its establishment. BVC '12 play their home matches at Sportpark 't Groothuis on the Alde Weteringweg, and their colours are green and yellow.

The club spent the majority of its history in the lower tiers of Dutch amateur football, but between 2011 and 2017 rose through five consecutive divisions to reach the Hoofdklasse, the highest level of amateur football in the Netherlands. After one season at that level, the club returned to the Eerste Klasse and remained there until 2022, when the club voluntarily stepped down and reoriented around Saturday football. They currently compete in the tenth-tier Vijfde Klasse, the lowest division of Dutch football.

== History ==
=== Founding and early years (1912–1940) ===
BVC '12 was founded on 5 May 1912 in Beek, at the time part of the municipality of Ubbergen in Gelderland. The club's name combines "BVC"—an abbreviation of Beekse Voetbalclub—with the suffix "'12", a reference to the year of establishment, a naming convention common among Dutch clubs of that era. In its earliest decades the club played within the Catholic Football Association (RKF), the competition structure organised along denominational lines that served much of the south and east of the Netherlands until its dissolution. BVC '12 remained part of that structure until 1940, when the club joined the Royal Dutch Football Association (KNVB).

=== KNVB era and mid-century ===
Following their affiliation with the KNVB, the club competed in the district competition structure of district East for the remainder of the 20th century. A photograph from 1964 in the club's own archive records the first team competing in the Tweede Klasse, and the club won a championship that year—the last time they would claim a title for over half a century. In subsequent decades the club gradually descended through the amateur divisions, and by the opening years of the 21st century were competing at the lowest division, Vijfde Klasse, of the district pyramid.

=== Rise through the amateur divisions (2011–2018) ===
From the 2011–12 season, BVC '12 embarked on a sustained rise through the Sunday division structure of district East. Over the course of six seasons, the club won five promotions, progressing from the Vijfde Klasse through the Vierde, Derde, Tweede and Eerste Klasse in succession. The title won in the 2016–17 season—which secured promotion to the Hoofdklasse—was described by the club as their first championship since 1963, 53 years earlier. The club's squad during this period was noted for its local composition, with a large proportion of players drawn from Beek itself.

In the 2017–18 season, BVC '12 competed in the Sunday Hoofdklasse B, the highest tier of Dutch amateur football, alongside clubs including Jong Den Bosch, VV Goes and OSS '20. Having also entered a Saturday first team in the ninth-tier Vierde Klasse of district East for the first time that season, the club was competing on two fronts simultaneously. BVC '12 were relegated from the Hoofdklasse at the end of the season, returning to the Eerste Klasse. The Saturday team was withdrawn from competition in October 2018, after the club was unable to field a sufficient number of players.

=== Transition to Saturday football (2018–present) ===
BVC '12 remained in the Eerste Klasse on Sundays through the 2021–22 season. In March 2022, while still competing at that level, the club announced it would move to Saturday football from the 2022–23 season and voluntarily enter the Vierde Klasse—four divisions below the Eerste Klasse. The board cited a growing gap between the youth academy and the first team, and a weakening connection with the village of Beek, as the reasons for the decision. The Sunday programme ended after 2021–22. The revived Saturday team competed in the Vierde Klasse in 2022–23 and 2023–24, before dropping to the bottom-tier Vijfde Klasse in 2024–25, where the club currently competes.

== Honours ==
Honour	Season(s)
Eerste Klasse	2016–17
Derde Klasse	1948–49, 1951–52, 2014–15
Vierde Klasse	1961–62, 1962–63, 2013–14
Vijfde Klasse	2012–13
