= Eerste Klasse =

- Founded: 1897
- Country: Netherlands
- Confederation: UEFA
- Number of clubs: 130 (10 Groups of 13)
- Level on pyramid: 6
- Promotion to: Vierde Divisie
- Relegation to: Tweede Klasse
- Domestic cup: KNVB Cup
- Current: 2026–27 Eerste Klasse

The Eerste Klasse (English: First Class) started as the 1st tier of football in the Netherlands and is now the 6th tier. The league is divided into ten divisions. These divisions correspond to the six districts of the Royal Dutch Football Association: each district is organised geographically.

Each division consists of 14 teams. The champion of the Eerste Klasse divisions are promoted to the Vierde Divisie (formerly Hoofdklasse). Furthermore, a season is divided into two periods (Dutch: periodes) of eight matches each. The winners of these periods qualify for promotion playoffs, provided they finish in the top nine overall in the season. The numbers 11 and 12 in the final rankings play relegation playoffs, and the numbers 13 and 14 relegated to the Tweede Klasse.

Until the 2022–23 season, clubs were divided into Saturday and Sunday groups. The separation between Saturday and Sunday football was abolished in the Eerste Klasse from 2023–24. Amateur clubs are asked before the season whether they want to play their home games on Saturday or Sunday. This rule may be deviated from by principled Saturday clubs that retain the right to play on their day.

== Eerste Klasse divisions ==
District	Divisions
West I	Eerste Klasse A, B
West II	Eerste Klasse C, D
South I	Eerste Klasse E
South II	Eerste Klasse F
East	Eerste Klasse G, H
North	Eerste Klasse I, J
