= 2020–21 in Dutch football =

Football in Netherlands
- Season: 2020–21

Men's football
- Eredivisie: Ajax
- Eerste Divisie: SC Cambuur
- KNVB Cup: Ajax
- Johan Cruyff Shield: Ajax

The 2020–21 season is the 131st season of competitive football in the Netherlands.

== League season ==
=== Eredivisie ===
Pos	Team	Pld	W	D	L	GF	GA	GD	Pts	Qualification or relegation
1	Ajax (C)	34	28	4	2	102	23	+79	88	Qualification for the Champions League group stage
2	PSV Eindhoven	34	21	9	4	74	35	+39	72	Qualification for the Champions League second qualifying round
3	AZ	34	21	8	5	75	41	+34	71	Qualification for the Europa League play-off round
4	Vitesse	34	18	7	9	52	38	+14	61	Qualification for the Europa Conference League third qualifying round
5	Feyenoord (O)	34	16	11	7	64	36	+28	59	Qualification for the European competition play-offs (Note: Winner of play-off will qualify to Europa Conference League second qualifying round.)
6	Utrecht	34	13	14	7	52	41	+11	53	Qualification for the European competition play-offs
7	Groningen	34	14	8	12	40	37	+3	50	Qualification for the European competition play-offs
8	Sparta Rotterdam	34	13	8	13	49	48	+1	47	Qualification for the European competition play-offs
9	Heracles Almelo	34	12	8	14	42	53	−11	44	
10	Twente	34	10	11	13	48	50	−2	41	
11	Fortuna Sittard	34	12	5	17	50	58	−8	41	
12	Heerenveen	34	9	12	13	43	49	−6	39	
13	PEC Zwolle	34	9	11	14	44	53	−9	38	
14	Willem II	34	8	7	19	40	68	−28	31	
15	RKC Waalwijk	34	7	9	18	33	55	−22	30	
16	Emmen (R)	34	7	9	18	40	68	−28	30	Qualification for the Relegation play-offs (Note: Seven teams, one from the Eredivisie and six from the Eerste Divisie, play for one spot in the 2021–22 Eredivisie. The remaining six teams play in the 2021–22 Eerste Divisie.)
17	VVV-Venlo (R)	34	6	5	23	43	91	−48	23	Relegation to Eerste Divisie
18	ADO Den Haag (R)	34	4	10	20	29	76	−47	22	Relegation to Eerste Divisie

Source: Eredivisie, Soccerway
Rules for classification: Season in progress: 1) Most points won; 2) Less points lost; 3) Goal difference; 4) Goals scored; 5) Alphabetical order; End of season: 1) Points; 2) Goal difference; 3) Goals scored; 4) Head-to-head points; 5) Head-to-head goal difference; 6) Head-to-head away goals scored; 7) Play-off if relevant for deciding champion, relegation or participating in a European league, otherwise by draw. 8) Penalty shoot-out (only after a play-off)
(C) Champions; (O) Play-off winners; (R) Relegated

=== Eerste Divisie ===
Pos	Team	Pld	W	D	L	GF	GA	GD	Pts	Promotion or qualification
1	SC Cambuur (Note: Winner of the First, Second and Fourth Period (rounds 1–9, 10–19 and 29–38).) (C, P)	38	29	5	4	109	36	+73	92	Champion and promotion to the Eredivisie
2	Go Ahead Eagles (P)	38	23	8	7	62	25	+37	77	Promotion to the Eredivisie
3	De Graafschap (Note: Winner of the Third Period (rounds 20–28).)	38	23	8	7	67	47	+20	77	Qualification to promotion play-offs
4	Almere City FC	38	22	9	7	75	48	+27	75	Qualification to promotion play-offs
5	NAC Breda	38	22	7	9	75	41	+34	73	Qualification to promotion play-offs
6	FC Volendam	38	19	9	10	79	52	+27	66	Qualification to promotion play-offs
7	N.E.C. (O, P)	38	20	6	12	68	45	+23	66	Qualification to promotion play-offs
8	Roda JC Kerkrade	38	15	12	11	67	61	+6	57	Qualification to promotion play-offs
9	Excelsior	38	14	6	18	65	66	−1	48	
10	TOP Oss	38	13	8	17	40	57	−17	47	
11	MVV Maastricht	38	13	7	18	50	72	−22	46	
12	Helmond Sport	38	11	12	15	51	68	−17	45	
13	Telstar	38	10	11	17	57	61	−4	41	
14	Jong PSV	38	10	10	18	54	65	−11	40	Reserve teams are not eligible to be promoted to the 2021–22 Eredivisie
15	FC Eindhoven	38	10	10	18	50	62	−12	40	
16	Jong Ajax	38	10	10	18	55	71	−16	40	Reserve teams are not eligible to be promoted to the 2021–22 Eredivisie
17	Jong AZ	38	11	5	22	56	92	−36	38	Reserve teams are not eligible to be promoted to the 2021–22 Eredivisie
18	Jong FC Utrecht	38	11	2	25	53	77	−24	35	Reserve teams are not eligible to be promoted to the 2021–22 Eredivisie
19	FC Den Bosch	38	8	8	22	59	85	−26	32	
20	FC Dordrecht	38	8	3	27	36	97	−61	27	

Source: Soccerway, Keuken Kampioen Divisie (in Dutch)
Rules for classification: Season in progress: 1) Most points won; 2) Less points lost; 3) Goal difference; 4) Goals scored; 5) Alphabetical order; End of season: 1) Points; 2) Goal difference; 3) Goals scored; 4) Head-to-head points; 5) Head-to-head goal difference; 6) Head-to-head away goals scored; 7) Play-off if relevant for deciding champion, relegation or participating in a European league, otherwise by draw. 8) Penalty shoot-out (only after a play-off)
(C) Champions; (O) Play-off winners; (P) Promoted

=== Tweede Divisie ===
Pos	Team	Pld	W	D	L	GF	GA	GD	Pts
1	AFC	5	4	1	0	15	5	+10	13
2	ASWH	6	4	0	2	12	7	+5	12
3	SV Spakenburg	6	3	3	0	11	6	+5	12
4	Quick Boys	6	4	0	2	7	8	−1	12
5	IJsselmeervogels	5	3	0	2	9	10	−1	9
6	Rijnsburgse Boys	5	2	2	1	10	6	+4	8
7	Kozakken Boys	5	2	2	1	12	10	+2	8
8	Katwijk	5	2	2	1	9	7	+2	8
9	HHC Hardenberg	6	2	2	2	7	7	0	8
10	Koninklijke HFC	4	2	0	2	6	5	+1	6
11	Jong Volendam	6	1	2	3	9	13	−4	5
12	GVVV	6	1	2	3	6	11	−5	5
13	TEC	4	1	1	2	6	6	0	4
14	Excelsior Maassluis	5	1	1	3	6	10	−4	4
15	Jong Sparta	6	0	4	2	6	9	−3	4
16	Scheveningen	4	0	3	1	3	4	−1	3
17	Noordwijk	5	0	3	2	7	10	−3	3
18	De Treffers	5	0	2	3	2	9	−7	2

Source: Soccerway
Rules for classification: Season in progress: 1) Most points won; 2) Less points lost; 3) Goal difference; 4) Goals scored; 5) Alphabetical order; End of season: 1) Points; 2) Goal difference; 3) Goals scored; 4) Head-to-head points; 5) Head-to-head goal difference; 6) Head-to-head away goals scored; 7) Play-off if relevant for deciding champion, relegation or participating in a European league, otherwise by draw. 8) Penalty shoot-out (only after a play-off)

=== Derde Divisie ===
==== Saturday League ====
Pos	Team	Pld	W	D	L	GF	GA	GD	Pts	Promotion, qualification or relegation
1	SteDoCo	6	4	1	1	13	5	+8	13	~~Promotion to Tweede Divisie~~
2	Lisse	5	3	1	1	11	7	+4	10	~~Qualification to promotion play-offs~~
3	Sparta Nijkerk	5	3	1	1	9	5	+4	10	~~Qualification to promotion play-offs~~
4	Excelsior '31	5	3	1	1	8	5	+3	10	~~Qualification to promotion play-offs~~
5	VVSB	5	2	3	0	10	7	+3	9	
6	Sportlust '46	5	3	0	2	6	5	+1	9	
7	Barendrecht	5	2	2	1	7	8	−1	8	
8	Hoek	6	2	2	2	11	9	+2	8	
9	Harkemase Boys	3	2	1	0	5	2	+3	7	
10	DOVO	5	2	1	2	16	8	+8	7	
11	ODIN '59	4	2	0	2	6	6	0	6	
12	Ajax (amateurs)	5	2	0	3	11	21	−10	6	
13	Staphorst	6	2	0	4	12	14	−2	6	
14	VVOG	4	1	1	2	1	3	−2	4	
15	DVS '33	5	1	1	3	9	10	−1	4	~~Qualification to relegation play-offs~~
16	Ter Leede	5	1	1	3	6	9	−3	4	~~Qualification to relegation play-offs~~
17	ACV	4	0	2	2	1	8	−7	2	~~Relegation to Hoofdklasse~~
18	GOES	5	0	0	5	2	12	−10	0	~~Relegation to Hoofdklasse~~

Source: Soccerway
Rules for classification: Season in progress: 1) Most points won; 2) Less points lost; 3) Goal difference; 4) Goals scored; 5) Alphabetical order; End of season: 1) Points; 2) Goal difference; 3) Goals scored; 4) Head-to-head points; 5) Head-to-head goal difference; 6) Head-to-head away goals scored; 7) Play-off if relevant for deciding champion, relegation or participating in a European league, otherwise by draw. 8) Penalty shoot-out (only after a play-off)

==== Sunday League ====
Pos	Team	Pld	W	D	L	GF	GA	GD	Pts	Promotion, qualification or relegation
1	USV Hercules	5	4	1	0	12	2	+10	13	~~Promotion to Tweede Divisie~~
2	Blauw Geel '38	6	4	1	1	17	8	+9	13	~~Qualification to promotion play-offs~~
3	OFC	5	3	1	1	10	7	+3	10	~~Qualification to promotion play-offs~~
4	Groene Ster	5	3	1	1	9	6	+3	10	~~Qualification to promotion play-offs~~
5	OSS '20	6	3	1	2	10	11	−1	10	
6	UNA	6	2	2	2	15	9	+6	8	
7	Unitas	6	2	2	2	13	8	+5	8	
8	Hollandia	5	2	1	2	6	7	−1	7	
9	Westlandia	6	2	1	3	10	11	−1	7	
10	Gemert	6	2	1	3	6	10	−4	7	
11	JOS Watergraafsmeer	6	2	1	3	4	9	−5	7	
12	Quick (H)	5	1	3	1	9	7	+2	6	
13	EVV	5	1	3	1	2	6	−4	6	
14	ADO '20	6	1	3	2	9	8	+1	6	
15	Dongen	6	2	0	4	5	9	−4	6	~~Qualification to relegation play-offs~~
16	Hoogland	5	1	2	2	8	11	−3	5	~~Qualification to relegation play-offs~~
17	DEM	5	1	2	2	6	13	−7	5	~~Relegation to Hoofdklasse~~
18	HSC '21	6	0	2	4	5	14	−9	2	~~Relegation to Hoofdklasse~~

Source: Soccerway
Rules for classification: Season in progress: 1) Most points won; 2) Less points lost; 3) Goal difference; 4) Goals scored; 5) Alphabetical order; End of season: 1) Points; 2) Goal difference; 3) Goals scored; 4) Head-to-head points; 5) Head-to-head goal difference; 6) Head-to-head away goals scored; 7) Play-off if relevant for deciding champion, relegation or participating in a European league, otherwise by draw. 8) Penalty shoot-out (only after a play-off)

=== Hoofdklasse ===
==== Saturday A League ====
Pos	Team	Pld	W	D	L	GF	GA	GD	Pts	Promotion, qualification or relegation
1	Achilles Veen	6	5	1	0	19	10	+9	16	~~Promotion to Derde Divisie~~
2	FC 's-Gravenzande	6	4	1	1	16	5	+11	13	~~Qualification to promotion play-offs~~
3	SV ARC	6	4	1	1	12	9	+3	13	~~Qualification to promotion play-offs~~
4	FC Rijnvogels	5	4	0	1	12	8	+4	12	~~Qualification to promotion play-offs~~
5	CVV de Jodan Boys	6	3	3	0	12	4	+8	12	
6	SC Feyenoord	5	3	2	0	17	6	+11	11	
7	DHSC	5	3	0	2	16	13	+3	9	
8	VV Spijkenisse	5	1	3	1	11	9	+2	6	
9	VV DUNO	5	2	0	3	5	3	+2	6	
10	SV Poortugaal	4	1	2	1	9	11	−2	5	
11	VV Smitshoek	6	1	1	4	8	19	−11	4	
12	VV Capelle	4	1	0	3	8	9	−1	3	
13	VV Scherpenzeel	4	1	0	3	4	11	−7	3	~~Qualification to relegation play-offs~~
14	VV Zwaluwen	4	0	0	4	8	16	−8	0	~~Qualification to relegation play-offs~~
15	VV Rijsoord	4	0	0	4	1	16	−15	0	~~Relegation to Eerste Klasse~~
16	Achilles '29	5	0	0	5	2	11	−9	0	~~Relegation to Eerste Klasse~~

Source: Soccerway
Rules for classification: Season in progress: 1) Most points won; 2) Less points lost; 3) Goal difference; 4) Goals scored; 5) Alphabetical order; End of season: 1) Points; 2) Goal difference; 3) Goals scored; 4) Head-to-head points; 5) Head-to-head goal difference; 6) Head-to-head away goals scored; 7) Play-off if relevant for deciding champion, relegation or participating in a European league, otherwise by draw. 8) Penalty shoot-out (only after a play-off)

==== Saturday B League ====
Pos	Team	Pld	W	D	L	GF	GA	GD	Pts	Promotion, qualification or relegation
1	Berkum	6	4	1	1	17	5	+12	13	~~Promotion to Derde Divisie~~
2	Swift	4	4	0	0	14	3	+11	12	~~Qualification to promotion play-offs~~
3	Flevo Boys	5	4	0	1	15	7	+8	12	~~Qualification to promotion play-offs~~
4	HZVV	5	4	0	1	13	6	+7	12	~~Qualification to promotion play-offs~~
5	Genemuiden	6	4	0	2	9	6	+3	12	
6	Eemdijk	5	3	1	1	13	4	+9	10	
7	SDC Putten	5	3	1	1	11	4	+7	10	
8	RKAV Volendam	5	3	1	1	11	7	+4	10	
9	AZSV	6	3	1	2	11	11	0	10	
10	Urk	6	2	1	3	10	12	−2	7	
11	NSC	6	2	0	4	10	11	−1	6	
12	DETO Twenterand	5	1	1	3	7	12	−5	4	
13	Noordscheschut	6	1	0	5	5	19	−14	3	~~Qualification to relegation play-offs~~
14	Buitenpost	6	1	0	5	4	19	−15	3	~~Qualification to relegation play-offs~~
15	ONS Sneek	5	0	1	4	5	14	−9	1	~~Relegation to Eerste Klasse~~
16	ASV De Dijk	5	0	0	5	0	15	−15	0	~~Relegation to Eerste Klasse~~

Source: Soccerway
Rules for classification: Season in progress: 1) Most points won; 2) Less points lost; 3) Goal difference; 4) Goals scored; 5) Alphabetical order; End of season: 1) Points; 2) Goal difference; 3) Goals scored; 4) Head-to-head points; 5) Head-to-head goal difference; 6) Head-to-head away goals scored; 7) Play-off if relevant for deciding champion, relegation or participating in a European league, otherwise by draw. 8) Penalty shoot-out (only after a play-off)

==== Sunday A League ====
Pos	Team	Pld	W	D	L	GF	GA	GD	Pts	Promotion, qualification or relegation
1	Velsen	6	3	2	1	11	3	+8	11	~~Promotion to Derde Divisie~~
2	Hoogeveen	6	3	1	2	12	7	+5	10	~~Qualification to promotion play-offs~~
3	SJC	6	3	1	2	11	7	+4	10	~~Qualification to promotion play-offs~~
4	RKZVC	6	3	1	2	11	12	−1	10	~~Qualification to promotion play-offs~~
5	De Zouaven	6	3	1	2	10	11	−1	10	
6	Alphense Boys	5	2	2	1	10	7	+3	8	
7	Longa '30	5	2	2	1	7	11	−4	8	
8	HBS Craeyenhout	6	2	2	2	10	7	+3	8	
9	Silvolde	5	2	1	2	11	9	+2	7	
10	Be Quick 1887	5	2	1	2	8	7	+1	7	
11	MVV Alcides	5	2	0	3	6	9	−3	6	
12	TAC '90	5	1	2	2	6	9	−3	5	
13	SDO	6	1	2	3	9	13	−4	5	~~Qualification to relegation play-offs~~
14	Purmersteijn	4	1	1	2	4	7	−3	4	~~Qualification to relegation play-offs~~
15	RKAVV	3	1	0	2	4	6	−2	3	~~Relegation to Eerste Klasse~~
16	VV Emmen	5	0	3	2	5	10	−5	3	~~Relegation to Eerste Klasse~~

Source: Soccerway
Rules for classification: Season in progress: 1) Most points won; 2) Less points lost; 3) Goal difference; 4) Goals scored; 5) Alphabetical order; End of season: 1) Points; 2) Goal difference; 3) Goals scored; 4) Head-to-head points; 5) Head-to-head goal difference; 6) Head-to-head away goals scored; 7) Play-off if relevant for deciding champion, relegation or participating in a European league, otherwise by draw. 8) Penalty shoot-out (only after a play-off)

==== Sunday B League ====
Pos	Team	Pld	W	D	L	GF	GA	GD	Pts	Promotion, qualification or relegation
1	Meerssen	6	4	2	0	11	5	+6	14	~~Promotion to Derde Divisie~~
2	Baronie	5	4	1	0	20	0	+20	13	~~Qualification to promotion play-offs~~
3	AWC	5	3	1	1	9	10	−1	10	~~Qualification to promotion play-offs~~
4	Orion	4	3	0	1	7	5	+2	9	~~Qualification to promotion play-offs~~
5	Halsteren	5	3	0	2	10	6	+4	9	
6	OJC Rosmalen	5	2	2	1	9	8	+1	8	
7	EHC	6	2	2	2	8	15	−7	8	
8	IFC	5	2	1	2	9	6	+3	7	
9	Moerse Boys	6	2	1	3	9	12	−3	7	
10	UDI '19	5	2	0	3	7	10	−3	6	
11	TOGB	5	1	2	2	7	11	−4	5	
12	VOC	6	1	1	4	7	12	−5	4	
13	Juliana '31	2	1	0	1	4	3	+1	3	~~Qualification to relegation play-offs~~
14	Minor	6	0	2	4	9	16	−7	2	~~Qualification to relegation play-offs~~
15	Nuenen	5	0	1	4	6	13	−7	1	~~Relegation to Eerste Klasse~~
16	Leonidas	0	0	0	0	0	0	0	0	Withdrawal from Sunday football

Source: Soccerway
Rules for classification: Season in progress: 1) Most points won; 2) Less points lost; 3) Goal difference; 4) Goals scored; 5) Alphabetical order; End of season: 1) Points; 2) Goal difference; 3) Goals scored; 4) Head-to-head points; 5) Head-to-head goal difference; 6) Head-to-head away goals scored; 7) Play-off if relevant for deciding champion, relegation or participating in a European league, otherwise by draw. 8) Penalty shoot-out (only after a play-off)

=== Eredivisie (women) ===
Pos	Team	Pld	W	D	L	GF	GA	GD	Pts	Qualification
1	Twente	14	10	2	2	46	14	+32	32	Qualification to Championship play-off
2	PSV	14	10	1	3	33	14	+19	31	Qualification to Championship play-off
3	Ajax	14	10	1	3	28	10	+18	31	Qualification to Championship play-off
4	ADO Den Haag	14	5	5	4	21	16	+5	20	Qualification to Championship play-off
5	PEC Zwolle	14	4	4	6	16	24	−8	16	Qualification to Placement play-off
6	Heerenveen	14	3	3	8	21	30	−9	12	Qualification to Placement play-off
7	Alkmaar	14	2	3	9	15	41	−26	9	Qualification to Placement play-off
8	Excelsior	14	1	3	10	8	39	−31	6	Qualification to Placement play-off

Source: Soccerway
Rules for classification: Season in progress: 1) Most points won; 2) Less points lost; 3) Goal difference; 4) Goals scored; 5) Alphabetical order; End of season: 1) Points; 2) Goal difference; 3) Goals scored; 4) Head-to-head points; 5) Head-to-head goal difference; 6) Head-to-head away goals scored; 7) Play-off if relevant for deciding champion, relegation or participating in a European league, otherwise by draw. 8) Penalty shoot-out (only after a play-off)
