= 2020–21 Hoofdklasse =

Hoofdklasse
- Season: 2020–21
- Champions: No champions
- Promoted: No team promoted
- Relegated: No team relegated

The 2020–21 season of the Hoofdklasse was played in four leagues, two for Saturday and two for Sunday. The champions of each league were to be promoted directly to the Derde Divisie; other teams could have been promoted through play-offs. The 2020–21 Hoofdklasse started on Saturday 29 August 2020 and ended abruptly on 24 February 2021.

== Effects of the 2020 coronavirus pandemic ==
During the previous season, on 31 March 2020, the KNVB decided to cancel all competitions at amateur level. They also decided, for those competitions involved, there would be no final standings, and therefore no champions, initially no promotions and no relegations.

On 26 May, former Derde Divisie club ONS Sneek was granted a voluntary demotion to the Hoofdklasse for financial reasons.

Later on 12 June, the KNVB officially announced that the Derde Divisie would again consist of 36 teams in 2020–21. This was one wish of CVTD, the interest group of football clubs from the Tweede and Derde Divisies. To fill vacancies and accommodate all teams that led their groups in the Hoofdklasse after the cancellation, the KNVB decided to make each Derde Divisie group have 18 teams. The Hoofdklasse group leaders, namely Sportlust '46, Staphorst, Unitas and Hollandia, therefore moved up to the Derde Divisie. The best runners-up of the Saturday and Sunday Hoofdklasse, Asser Christelijke Voetbalvereniging (ACV) and JOS Watergraafsmeer respectively, were also promoted.

Meppeler Sport Club and Quick '20 withdrew from Sunday football to compete instead in its Saturday counterpart. As a result this season started with almost the same teams as the previous one.

On 24 February 2021, the KNVB eventually discontinued ongoing category A senior competitions, including Hoofdklasse, again without promotion or relegation.

== Play-offs ==
=== Promotion ===
In each competition teams play periods of 10 games, three times per season (30 games per season). After each period the best team which has not yet qualified earns a spot in the play-offs for the Derde Divisie as the period champion. 6 teams from the Saturday Hoofdklasse play against 2 teams from the Saturday Derde Divisie for 2 promotion spots. The teams from the Sunday leagues do the same.

=== Relegation ===
The teams in place 13 and 14 at the end of the season fight against relegation in the relegation play-offs. They face the period champions of the Eerste Klasse.

== Saturday A ==
=== Teams ===
Location of teams in the Saturday Hoofdklasse A 2020/21
South Holland clubs in the Saturday Hoofdklasse A 2020/21

Club	Home City	Venue	Capacity
Achilles '29	Groesbeek	Sportpark De Heikant	4,500
Achilles Veen	Veen	Sportpark De Hanen Weide	2,000
ARC	Alphen aan den Rijn	Sportpark Zegersloot	9,000
Capelle	Capelle aan den IJssel	Sportpark 't Slot	3,000
DHSC	Utrecht	Sportpark Wesley Sneijder	2,000
DUNO	Doorwerth	Sportpark De Waayenberg	1,000
SC Feyenoord	Rotterdam	Varkenoord	1,400
's-Gravenzande	's-Gravenzande	Juliana Sportpark	3,000
Jodan Boys	Gouda	Sportpark Oosterwei	1,500
Poortugaal	Poortugaal	Sportpark Polder Albrandswaard	1,000
Rijnvogels	Katwijk aan den Rijn	Sportpark De Kooltuin	1,500
Rijsoord	Ridderkerk	Sportpark Rijsoord	1,800
Smitshoek	Barendrecht	Sportpark Smitshoek	2,000
Spijkenisse	Spijkenisse	Sportpark Jaap Riedijk	1,800
Scherpenzeel	Scherpenzeel	Sportpark De Bree-Oost	1,000
Zwaluwen	Vlaardingen	Sportpark Zwaluwen	2,750

>> Competition cancelled, what's listed below is the situation on 10 October 2020, the date the last matches were played.<<

=== Standings ===
Pos	Team	Pld	W	D	L	GF	GA	GD	Pts	Promotion, qualification or relegation
1	Achilles Veen	6	5	1	0	19	10	+9	16	~~Promotion to Derde Divisie~~
2	FC 's-Gravenzande	6	4	1	1	16	5	+11	13	~~Qualification to promotion play-offs~~
3	SV ARC	6	4	1	1	12	9	+3	13	~~Qualification to promotion play-offs~~
4	FC Rijnvogels	5	4	0	1	12	8	+4	12	~~Qualification to promotion play-offs~~
5	CVV de Jodan Boys	6	3	3	0	12	4	+8	12	
6	SC Feyenoord	5	3	2	0	17	6	+11	11	
7	DHSC	5	3	0	2	16	13	+3	9	
8	VV Spijkenisse	5	1	3	1	11	9	+2	6	
9	VV DUNO	5	2	0	3	5	3	+2	6	
10	SV Poortugaal	4	1	2	1	9	11	−2	5	
11	VV Smitshoek	6	1	1	4	8	19	−11	4	
12	VV Capelle	4	1	0	3	8	9	−1	3	
13	VV Scherpenzeel	4	1	0	3	4	11	−7	3	~~Qualification to relegation play-offs~~
14	VV Zwaluwen	4	0	0	4	8	16	−8	0	~~Qualification to relegation play-offs~~
15	VV Rijsoord	4	0	0	4	1	16	−15	0	~~Relegation to Eerste Klasse~~
16	Achilles '29	5	0	0	5	2	11	−9	0	~~Relegation to Eerste Klasse~~

Source: Soccerway
Rules for classification: Season in progress: 1) Most points won; 2) Less points lost; 3) Goal difference; 4) Goals scored; 5) Alphabetical order; End of season: 1) Points; 2) Goal difference; 3) Goals scored; 4) Head-to-head points; 5) Head-to-head goal difference; 6) Head-to-head away goals scored; 7) Play-off if relevant for deciding champion, relegation or participating in a European league, otherwise by draw. 8) Penalty shoot-out (only after a play-off)

=== Fixtures/results ===
Home \ Away	A29	ACH	ARC	CAP	DHS	DUN	FEY	GRA	JOD	POO	RVO	RSO	SPZ	SMI	SPI	ZWA
Achilles '29		~~6 Feb~~	~~6 Mar~~	~~16 Jan~~	1–3	0–1	~~31 Oct~~	~~30 Jan~~	~~8 May~~	~~22 May~~	~~14 Nov~~	~~17 Apr~~	~~5 Dec~~	~~17 Oct~~	~~3 Apr~~	
Achilles Veen	~~7 Nov~~		~~30 Jan~~	4–3	4–1	~~16 Jan~~	~~27 Feb~~	~~17 Apr~~	1–1	~~8 May~~	~~24 Oct~~	~~5 Dec~~	~~21 Nov~~	~~10 Apr~~	~~22 May~~	~~13 Mar~~
ARC	~~28 Nov~~	~~31 Oct~~		~~22 May~~	5–3	~~17 Oct~~	~~17 Apr~~	0–0	~~6 Feb~~	~~14 Nov~~	~~3 Apr~~	3–1	~~13 Mar~~	~~16 Jan~~	~~8 May~~	~~23 Jan~~
Capelle	3–1	~~23 Jan~~	0–1		~~12 Dec~~	~~3 Apr~~	~~14 Nov~~	~~13 Mar~~	~~28 Nov~~	~~17 Apr~~	2–3	~~27 Feb~~	~~15 May~~	~~31 Oct~~	~~24 Oct~~	~~24 Apr~~
DHSC	~~13 Mar~~	~~3 Apr~~	~~27 Feb~~	~~8 May~~		~~14 Nov~~		~~24 Oct~~	~~17 Apr~~	~~31 Oct~~	~~28 Nov~~	~~16 Jan~~	4–2	~~30 Jan~~	5–1	~~15 May~~
DUNO	~~15 May~~	0–1	~~20 Mar~~	~~7 Nov~~	~~10 Apr~~		~~13 Mar~~	~~27 Feb~~	~~24 Oct~~	~~28 Nov~~	~~24 Apr~~	4–0	0–1	~~21 Nov~~	~~23 Jan~~	~~12 Dec~~
SC Feyenoord	~~24 Apr~~	~~17 Oct~~	~~21 Nov~~	~~20 Mar~~	~~6 Mar~~	1–0		~~5 Dec~~	~~23 Jan~~	~~6 Feb~~	~~12 Dec~~	~~22 May~~	~~10 Apr~~	5–0	~~7 Nov~~	6–1
's-Gravenzande	3–0	~~28 Nov~~	~~24 Apr~~	~~17 Oct~~	~~23 Jan~~	~~31 Oct~~	~~15 May~~		~~6 Mar~~	~~3 Apr~~	2–3	~~20 Mar~~	5–0	~~14 Nov~~	~~12 Dec~~	~~6 Feb~~
Jodan Boys	1–0	~~15 May~~	5–0	~~10 Apr~~	~~5 Dec~~	~~30 Jan~~	2–2	~~21 Nov~~		~~17 Oct~~	~~27 Feb~~	~~3 Apr~~	~~16 Jan~~	~~24 Apr~~	~~13 Mar~~	~~31 Oct~~
Poortugaal	~~24 Oct~~	~~12 Dec~~	~~10 Apr~~	~~21 Nov~~	~~24 Apr~~	~~6 Mar~~	3–3	~~7 Nov~~	~~20 Mar~~		~~15 May~~		~~30 Jan~~	~~5 Dec~~	~~27 Feb~~	4–3
Rijnvogels	~~10 Apr~~	~~20 Mar~~	~~7 Nov~~	~~30 Jan~~	~~22 May~~	~~5 Dec~~	~~8 May~~	~~16 Jan~~	0–2	3–0		~~21 Nov~~	~~17 Oct~~	3–2	~~6 Feb~~	~~6 Mar~~
Rijsoord	~~12 Dec~~	~~24 Apr~~	~~15 May~~		~~17 Oct~~	~~6 Feb~~	~~28 Nov~~	0–3	~~14 Nov~~	~~23 Jan~~	~~13 Mar~~		~~31 Oct~~	~~6 Mar~~	0–6	~~10 Apr~~
SPZ	~~20 Mar~~	~~6 Mar~~	~~12 Dec~~		~~6 Feb~~	~~17 Apr~~	~~24 Oct~~	~~22 May~~	~~7 Nov~~		~~23 Jan~~	~~8 May~~		1–2	~~28 Nov~~	~~14 Nov~~
Smitshoek	~~23 Jan~~	3–6	0–3	~~6 Feb~~	~~7 Nov~~	~~22 May~~	~~3 Apr~~	~~8 May~~	~~12 Dec~~	~~13 Mar~~	~~17 Apr~~	~~24 Oct~~	~~27 Feb~~		1–1	~~28 Nov~~
Spijkenisse	~~21 Nov~~	~~14 Nov~~	~~5 Dec~~	~~6 Mar~~	~~20 Mar~~		~~16 Jan~~	~~10 Apr~~	1–1	2–2	~~31 Oct~~	~~30 Jan~~	~~24 Apr~~	~~15 May~~		~~17 Oct~~
Zwaluwen	~~27 Feb~~	2–3	~~24 Oct~~	~~5 Dec~~	~~21 Nov~~	~~8 May~~	~~30 Jan~~	2–3	~~22 May~~	~~16 Jan~~		~~7 Nov~~	~~3 Apr~~	~~20 Mar~~	~~17 Apr~~	

Source: Soccerway
Legend: Blue = home team win; Yellow = draw; Red = away team win.

== Saturday B ==
=== Teams ===
Location of teams in the Saturday Hoofdklasse B 2020/21

Club	Location	Venue	Capacity
AZSV	Aalten	Sportpark Villekamp	3,000
Berkum	Zwolle	Sportpark De Vegtlust	3,000
Buitenpost	Buitenpost	Sportpark De Swadde	1,500
DETO Twenterand	Vriezenveen	Sportpark 't Midden	4,000
ASV De Dijk	Amsterdam	Sportpark Schellingwoude	1,500
Eemdijk	Bunschoten	Sportpark De Vinken	1,500
Flevo Boys	Emmeloord	Sportpark Ervenbos	3,250
Genemuiden	Genemuiden	Sportpark De Wetering	5,900
HZVV	Hoogeveen	Sportvelden Bentinckspark	5,000
Noordscheschut	Noordscheschut	Sportpark De Meulewieke	1,000
NSC	Nijkerk	Sportpark De NSC Burcht	1,800
ONS Sneek	Sneek	Zuidersportpark	3,150
SDC Putten	Putten	Sportpark Putter Eng	4,500
Swift	Amsterdam	Sportpark Olympiaplein	1,500
Urk	Urk	Sportpark De Vormt	4,500
RKAV Volendam	Volendam	Kwabo Stadion	6,500

>> Competition cancelled, what's listed below is the situation on 10 October 2020, the date the last matches were played.<<

=== Standings ===
Pos	Team	Pld	W	D	L	GF	GA	GD	Pts	Promotion, qualification or relegation
1	Berkum	6	4	1	1	17	5	+12	13	~~Promotion to Derde Divisie~~
2	Swift	4	4	0	0	14	3	+11	12	~~Qualification to promotion play-offs~~
3	Flevo Boys	5	4	0	1	15	7	+8	12	~~Qualification to promotion play-offs~~
4	HZVV	5	4	0	1	13	6	+7	12	~~Qualification to promotion play-offs~~
5	Genemuiden	6	4	0	2	9	6	+3	12	
6	Eemdijk	5	3	1	1	13	4	+9	10	
7	SDC Putten	5	3	1	1	11	4	+7	10	
8	RKAV Volendam	5	3	1	1	11	7	+4	10	
9	AZSV	6	3	1	2	11	11	0	10	
10	Urk	6	2	1	3	10	12	−2	7	
11	NSC	6	2	0	4	10	11	−1	6	
12	DETO Twenterand	5	1	1	3	7	12	−5	4	
13	Noordscheschut	6	1	0	5	5	19	−14	3	~~Qualification to relegation play-offs~~
14	Buitenpost	6	1	0	5	4	19	−15	3	~~Qualification to relegation play-offs~~
15	ONS Sneek	5	0	1	4	5	14	−9	1	~~Relegation to Eerste Klasse~~
16	ASV De Dijk	5	0	0	5	0	15	−15	0	~~Relegation to Eerste Klasse~~

Source: Soccerway
Rules for classification: Season in progress: 1) Most points won; 2) Less points lost; 3) Goal difference; 4) Goals scored; 5) Alphabetical order; End of season: 1) Points; 2) Goal difference; 3) Goals scored; 4) Head-to-head points; 5) Head-to-head goal difference; 6) Head-to-head away goals scored; 7) Play-off if relevant for deciding champion, relegation or participating in a European league, otherwise by draw. 8) Penalty shoot-out (only after a play-off)

=== Fixtures/results ===
Home \ Away	AZS	BER	BUI	DET	DIJ	EEM	FLE	GEN	HZV	NSS	NSC	ONS	SDC	SWI	URK	VOL
AZSV		~~12 Dec~~	~~24 Oct~~	~~28 Nov~~	~~27 Feb~~	~~3 Apr~~	~~8 May~~	1–0	~~22 May~~	~~23 Jan~~	~~6 Feb~~	3–3	~~7 Nov~~	~~13 Mar~~	2–1	~~17 Apr~~
Berkum	~~24 Apr~~		~~3 Apr~~	~~31 Oct~~	~~16 Jan~~	3–2	~~21 Nov~~	3–0	~~30 Jan~~	5–0	~~10 Apr~~	~~13 Mar~~	~~5 Dec~~	~~17 Oct~~	~~15 May~~	~~27 Feb~~
Buitenpost	~~6 Mar~~	~~14 Nov~~		~~10 Apr~~	~~31 Oct~~	~~28 Nov~~	0–4	~~15 May~~	~~6 Feb~~	~~12 Dec~~	1–5	2–0	~~17 Oct~~	~~23 Jan~~	~~24 Apr~~	~~13 Mar~~
DETO Twenterand	~~20 Mar~~	~~22 May~~	~~7 Nov~~		~~3 Apr~~	~~30 Jan~~	2–3	~~24 Oct~~	~~8 May~~	~~27 Feb~~	~~5 Dec~~	~~17 Apr~~	~~21 Nov~~	~~16 Jan~~	2–3	0–0
ASV De Dijk	0–3	~~7 Nov~~	~~8 May~~	~~14 Nov~~		~~24 Oct~~	~~22 May~~	~~12 Dec~~	~~17 Apr~~	~~20 Mar~~	0–3	~~28 Nov~~	~~6 Feb~~	0–2	~~6 Mar~~	~~23 Jan~~
Eemdijk	2–0	~~23 Jan~~	~~22 May~~	5–0	~~10 Apr~~		~~5 Dec~~	~~21 Nov~~	3–0	~~24 Apr~~	~~20 Mar~~	~~7 Nov~~	~~6 Mar~~	~~6 Feb~~	~~17 Oct~~	~~12 Dec~~
Flevo Boys	~~14 Nov~~	~~6 Mar~~	~~20 Mar~~	~~6 Feb~~	4–0	~~15 May~~		~~24 Apr~~	~~31 Oct~~	2–0	~~17 Oct~~	~~12 Dec~~	~~23 Jan~~	~~3 Apr~~	~~28 Nov~~	
Genemuiden	~~16 Jan~~	~~6 Feb~~	1–0	~~23 Jan~~	~~13 Mar~~	~~17 Apr~~	5–2		~~17 Oct~~	~~28 Nov~~	~~22 May~~	~~8 May~~	2–0	~~14 Nov~~	~~31 Oct~~	~~3 Apr~~
HZVV	~~21 Nov~~	~~24 Oct~~	3–1	~~12 Dec~~		~~13 Mar~~	~~27 Feb~~	~~20 Mar~~		~~15 May~~	~~7 Nov~~	~~23 Jan~~	~~10 Apr~~	~~28 Nov~~	4–1	~~24 Apr~~
Noordscheschut	~~17 Oct~~	~~8 May~~	~~17 Apr~~	1–3	~~5 Dec~~	~~31 Oct~~	~~30 Jan~~	~~6 Mar~~	1–4		~~16 Jan~~	~~3 Apr~~	1–5	~~22 May~~	~~6 Feb~~	~~14 Nov~~
NSC	~~31 Oct~~	~~28 Nov~~	~~27 Feb~~	~~24 Apr~~	~~15 May~~	~~14 Nov~~	~~13 Mar~~	0–1	~~3 Apr~~	0–2		~~24 Oct~~	~~12 Dec~~	~~17 Apr~~	~~23 Jan~~	1–3
ONS Sneek	~~15 May~~	1–5	~~30 Jan~~	~~17 Oct~~	~~24 Apr~~	~~16 Jan~~	~~10 Apr~~	~~5 Dec~~	0–2	~~21 Nov~~	~~6 Mar~~		~~20 Mar~~	1–2	~~14 Nov~~	~~31 Oct~~
SDC Putten	~~30 Jan~~	~~17 Apr~~	~~16 Jan~~	~~15 May~~	3–0	1–1	~~24 Oct~~	~~27 Feb~~	~~14 Nov~~	~~13 Mar~~	~~8 May~~			~~31 Oct~~	~~3 Apr~~	~~28 Nov~~
Swift	~~5 Dec~~	~~20 Mar~~	6–0		~~30 Jan~~		~~7 Nov~~	~~10 Apr~~	~~6 Mar~~	~~24 Oct~~	~~21 Nov~~	~~27 Feb~~	~~24 Apr~~		~~12 Dec~~	~~15 May~~
Urk	~~10 Apr~~	1–1	~~5 Dec~~	~~13 Mar~~	~~21 Nov~~	~~27 Feb~~	~~17 Apr~~	~~30 Jan~~	~~16 Jan~~	~~7 Nov~~	4–1	~~22 May~~	0–2	~~8 May~~		~~24 Oct~~
RKAV Volendam	5–2	1–0	~~21 Nov~~	~~6 Mar~~	~~17 Oct~~	~~8 May~~	~~16 Jan~~	~~7 Nov~~	~~5 Dec~~	~~10 Apr~~	~~30 Jan~~	~~6 Feb~~	~~22 May~~	2–4	~~20 Mar~~	

Source: Soccerway
Legend: Blue = home team win; Yellow = draw; Red = away team win.

== Sunday A ==
=== Teams ===
Location of teams in the Sunday Hoofdklasse A 2020/21

Club	Location	Venue	Capacity
Alcides	Meppel	Sportpark Ezinge	5,000
Alphense Boys	Alphen aan den Rijn	Sportpark De Bijlen	3,200
Be Quick 1887	Haren	Stadion Esserberg	12,000
De Zouaven	Grootebroek	Sportpark De Kloet	2,000
VV Emmen	Emmen	Sportpark De Meerdijk	1,700
HBS Craeyenhout	The Hague	Sportpark Craeyenhout	2,600
Hoogeveen	Hoogeveen	Sportvelden Bentinckspark	5,000
Longa '30	Lichtenvoorde	Sportpark De Treffer	2,300
Purmersteijn	Purmerend	Purmersteijn Sportpark	1,500
RKAVV	Leidschendam	Sportpark Kastelering	4,500
RKZVC	Zieuwent	Sportpark De Greune Weide	1,500
SDO	Bussum	Sportpark De Kuil	1,500
Silvolde	Silvolde	Sportpark De Munsterman	1,500
SJC	Noordwijk	Gemeentelijk Sportpark SJC	3,000
TAC '90	The Hague	Sportpark De Verlichting	1,000
Velsen	Velsen	Sportpark Driehuis	1,000

>> Competition cancelled, what's listed below is the situation on 11 October 2020, the date the last matches were played.<<

=== Standings ===
Pos	Team	Pld	W	D	L	GF	GA	GD	Pts	Promotion, qualification or relegation
1	Velsen	6	3	2	1	11	3	+8	11	~~Promotion to Derde Divisie~~
2	Hoogeveen	6	3	1	2	12	7	+5	10	~~Qualification to promotion play-offs~~
3	SJC	6	3	1	2	11	7	+4	10	~~Qualification to promotion play-offs~~
4	RKZVC	6	3	1	2	11	12	−1	10	~~Qualification to promotion play-offs~~
5	De Zouaven	6	3	1	2	10	11	−1	10	
6	Alphense Boys	5	2	2	1	10	7	+3	8	
7	Longa '30	5	2	2	1	7	11	−4	8	
8	HBS Craeyenhout	6	2	2	2	10	7	+3	8	
9	Silvolde	5	2	1	2	11	9	+2	7	
10	Be Quick 1887	5	2	1	2	8	7	+1	7	
11	MVV Alcides	5	2	0	3	6	9	−3	6	
12	TAC '90	5	1	2	2	6	9	−3	5	
13	SDO	6	1	2	3	9	13	−4	5	~~Qualification to relegation play-offs~~
14	Purmersteijn	4	1	1	2	4	7	−3	4	~~Qualification to relegation play-offs~~
15	RKAVV	3	1	0	2	4	6	−2	3	~~Relegation to Eerste Klasse~~
16	VV Emmen	5	0	3	2	5	10	−5	3	~~Relegation to Eerste Klasse~~

Source: Soccerway
Rules for classification: Season in progress: 1) Most points won; 2) Less points lost; 3) Goal difference; 4) Goals scored; 5) Alphabetical order; End of season: 1) Points; 2) Goal difference; 3) Goals scored; 4) Head-to-head points; 5) Head-to-head goal difference; 6) Head-to-head away goals scored; 7) Play-off if relevant for deciding champion, relegation or participating in a European league, otherwise by draw. 8) Penalty shoot-out (only after a play-off)

=== Fixtures/results ===
Home \ Away	ALC	ALP	BEQ	EMM	HBS	HOO	LON	PUR	RKA	RKZ	SDO	SIL	SJC	TAC	VEL	ZOU
MVV Alcides		~~18 Oct~~	2–1	~~6 Dec~~	~~31 Jan~~	~~24 May~~	~~1 Nov~~	~~3 Apr~~	~~17 Jan~~	~~18 Apr~~	~~9 May~~	~~7 Feb~~	0–2	2–3	~~15 Nov~~	~~7 Mar~~
Alphense Boys	~~23 Jan~~		~~28 Nov~~	~~28 Feb~~	~~9 May~~	~~14 Mar~~	~~3 Apr~~		~~7 Feb~~	~~25 Oct~~	~~13 Dec~~	2–1	~~8 Nov~~	~~24 May~~	~~18 Apr~~	3–0
Be Quick 1887	~~27 Feb~~	~~20 Mar~~		~~3 Apr~~	3–0	~~17 Jan~~	~~30 Jan~~	~~18 Apr~~	~~6 Dec~~	~~8 Nov~~	~~24 May~~	1–1	~~22 Nov~~	~~9 May~~	0–4	~~25 Oct~~
VV Emmen	~~21 Mar~~	3–3	~~15 Nov~~		~~24 May~~	0–2	~~25 Oct~~	~~29 Nov~~		~~9 May~~	~~8 Nov~~	~~7 Mar~~	~~7 Feb~~	~~18 Apr~~	~~24 Jan~~	~~13 Dec~~
HBS Craeyenhout	0–1	~~15 Nov~~	~~7 Feb~~	4–1		~~3 Apr~~	~~16 May~~	~~13 Dec~~	~~18 Oct~~	~~21 Mar~~	~~7 Mar~~	~~29 Nov~~	~~24 Jan~~	~~1 Nov~~	1–1	~~25 Apr~~
Hoogeveen	~~25 Oct~~	~~6 Dec~~	0–3	~~31 Jan~~	~~8 Nov~~		6–0	~~28 Feb~~	~~22 Nov~~	1–1	~~21 Mar~~	~~13 Dec~~	~~25 Apr~~	~~7 Mar~~	~~16 May~~	~~11 Apr~~
Longa '30	~~25 Apr~~	2–1		~~11 Apr~~	~~6 Dec~~	~~7 Feb~~		~~8 Nov~~	~~20 Mar~~	~~24 May~~	~~24 Jan~~	~~18 Oct~~	~~7 Mar~~	2–2	~~13 Dec~~	~~22 Nov~~
Purmersteijn	~~22 Nov~~	~~16 May~~	~~18 Oct~~	~~25 Apr~~	~~11 Apr~~	3–2	~~17 Jan~~		~~7 Mar~~	~~31 Jan~~	0–0	~~15 Nov~~	~~21 Mar~~		~~1 Nov~~	~~6 Dec~~
RKAVV		~~1 Nov~~	~~25 Apr~~	~~16 May~~	~~14 Mar~~	~~18 Apr~~	~~14 Nov~~	~~25 Oct~~		~~28 Feb~~	~~29 Nov~~	~~24 Jan~~	~~13 Dec~~	~~3 Apr~~	0–3	3–0
RKZVC	~~13 Dec~~	~~7 Mar~~	~~11 Apr~~	~~1 Nov~~	1–5	~~24 Jan~~	~~29 Nov~~	2–1	3–1		~~15 Nov~~	~~25 Apr~~	~~18 Oct~~	~~7 Feb~~	~~14 Mar~~	~~16 May~~
SDO	3–1	~~25 Apr~~	~~1 Nov~~	~~17 Jan~~	~~22 Nov~~	~~18 Oct~~	1–1	~~14 Mar~~	~~11 Apr~~	~~3 Apr~~		~~16 May~~	~~6 Dec~~	~~31 Jan~~	~~28 Feb~~	3–4
Silvolde	~~8 Nov~~	~~11 Apr~~	~~13 Mar~~	~~22 Nov~~	~~18 Apr~~	~~9 May~~	~~27 Feb~~	~~24 May~~		~~6 Dec~~	5–2		2–3	~~17 Jan~~	~~25 Oct~~	~~31 Jan~~
SJC	~~14 Mar~~	~~31 Jan~~	~~16 May~~	1–1	~~25 Oct~~	~~1 Nov~~	1–2	3–0	~~9 May~~	~~17 Jan~~	~~18 Apr~~	~~3 Apr~~		~~15 Nov~~	~~29 Nov~~	~~28 Feb~~
TAC '90	~~16 May~~	~~22 Nov~~	~~13 Dec~~	0–0	~~28 Feb~~	~~29 Nov~~	~~14 Mar~~	~~24 Jan~~	~~8 Nov~~	0–3	~~25 Oct~~	1–2	~~11 Apr~~		~~25 Apr~~	~~21 Mar~~
Velsen	~~11 Apr~~	1–1	~~7 Mar~~	~~18 Oct~~	~~17 Jan~~	0–1	~~9 May~~	~~7 Feb~~	~~31 Jan~~	~~22 Nov~~	2–0	~~21 Mar~~	~~24 May~~	~~6 Dec~~		~~8 Nov~~
De Zouaven	~~29 Nov~~	~~17 Jan~~	~~24 Jan~~	~~14 Mar~~	0–0	~~15 Nov~~	~~18 Apr~~	~~9 May~~	~~24 May~~	4–1	~~7 Feb~~	~~1 Nov~~	2–1	~~18 Oct~~	~~3 Apr~~	

Source: Soccerway
Legend: Blue = home team win; Yellow = draw; Red = away team win.

== Sunday B ==
=== Teams ===
Location of teams in the Sunday Hoofdklasse B 2020/21

Club	Location	Venue	Capacity
AWC	Wijchen	Sportpark De Wijchert	2,000
Baronie	Breda	Sportpark Blauwe Kei	7,000
EHC	Hoensbroek	Sportpark De Dem	3,000
Halsteren	Halsteren	Sportpark De Beek	1,800
IFC	Hendrik-Ido-Ambacht	Sportpark Schildman	1,500
Juliana '31	Malden	Sportpark De Broeklanden	1,500
Leonidas	Rotterdam	Sportpark Leonidas	3,000
Meerssen	Meerssen	Sportpark Marsana	2,000
Minor	Nuth	Sportpark De Kollenberg	1,500
Moerse Boys	Zundert	Sportpark De Akkermolen	1,500
Nuenen	Nuenen	Sportpark Oude Landen	1,800
OJC Rosmalen	Rosmalen	Sportpark De Groote Wielen	3,000
Orion	Nijmegen	Sportpark Mariënbosch	1,500
TOGB	Berkel en Rodenrijs	Sportpark Het Hoge Land	1,500
UDI '19	Uden	Sportpark Parkzicht	5,000
VOC	Rotterdam	Sportpark Hazelaarweg	1,000

>> Competition cancelled, what's listed below is the situation on 11 October 2020, the date the last matches were played.<<

=== Standings ===
Pos	Team	Pld	W	D	L	GF	GA	GD	Pts	Promotion, qualification or relegation
1	Meerssen	6	4	2	0	11	5	+6	14	~~Promotion to Derde Divisie~~
2	Baronie	5	4	1	0	20	0	+20	13	~~Qualification to promotion play-offs~~
3	AWC	5	3	1	1	9	10	−1	10	~~Qualification to promotion play-offs~~
4	Orion	4	3	0	1	7	5	+2	9	~~Qualification to promotion play-offs~~
5	Halsteren	5	3	0	2	10	6	+4	9	
6	OJC Rosmalen	5	2	2	1	9	8	+1	8	
7	EHC	6	2	2	2	8	15	−7	8	
8	IFC	5	2	1	2	9	6	+3	7	
9	Moerse Boys	6	2	1	3	9	12	−3	7	
10	UDI '19	5	2	0	3	7	10	−3	6	
11	TOGB	5	1	2	2	7	11	−4	5	
12	VOC	6	1	1	4	7	12	−5	4	
13	Juliana '31	2	1	0	1	4	3	+1	3	~~Qualification to relegation play-offs~~
14	Minor	6	0	2	4	9	16	−7	2	~~Qualification to relegation play-offs~~
15	Nuenen	5	0	1	4	6	13	−7	1	~~Relegation to Eerste Klasse~~
16	Leonidas	0	0	0	0	0	0	0	0	Withdrawal from Sunday football

Source: Soccerway
Rules for classification: Season in progress: 1) Most points won; 2) Less points lost; 3) Goal difference; 4) Goals scored; 5) Alphabetical order; End of season: 1) Points; 2) Goal difference; 3) Goals scored; 4) Head-to-head points; 5) Head-to-head goal difference; 6) Head-to-head away goals scored; 7) Play-off if relevant for deciding champion, relegation or participating in a European league, otherwise by draw. 8) Penalty shoot-out (only after a play-off)

=== Fixtures/results ===
Home \ Away	AWC	BAR	EHC	HAL	IFC	JUL	LEO	MRS	MIN	MOE	NUE	OJC	ORI	TOG	UDI	VOC
AWC		~~7 Feb~~	4–1	~~24 Jan~~	~~25 Apr~~	~~1 Nov~~		~~18 Oct~~	~~15 Nov~~	~~7 Mar~~	~~14 Mar~~	0–0	~~11 Apr~~	~~13 Dec~~	~~16 May~~	~~29 Nov~~
Baronie	8–0		~~24 Jan~~	~~29 Nov~~	0–0			~~11 Apr~~	~~25 Oct~~	~~22 Nov~~	~~25 Apr~~	~~8 Nov~~	~~13 Dec~~	~~16 May~~	~~21 Mar~~	~~14 Mar~~
EHC	~~31 Jan~~	0–6		2–1	~~15 Nov~~	~~25 Apr~~		~~21 Mar~~	3–2	~~16 May~~	~~1 Nov~~	~~7 Mar~~	~~18 Oct~~	~~22 Nov~~	~~6 Dec~~	~~17 Jan~~
Halsteren	1–2	~~7 Mar~~	~~28 Feb~~		~~13 Dec~~	~~31 Jan~~		~~25 Apr~~	~~21 Mar~~	~~6 Dec~~	~~16 May~~	~~22 Nov~~	3–0	~~25 Oct~~	~~11 Apr~~	3–2
IFC	~~6 Dec~~	~~17 Jan~~	~~24 May~~	~~9 May~~		~~22 Nov~~		0–2	5–1	~~11 Apr~~	~~25 Oct~~	4–2	~~14 Mar~~	~~8 Nov~~	~~31 Jan~~	~~28 Feb~~
Juliana '31	~~9 May~~	~~18 Apr~~	~~29 Nov~~		~~7 Mar~~			1–2	~~8 Nov~~	3–1	~~24 Jan~~		~~15 Nov~~	~~21 Mar~~	~~13 Dec~~	~~25 Oct~~
Leonidas																
Meerssen	~~17 Jan~~	~~15 Nov~~	0–0	~~1 Nov~~	~~3 Apr~~	~~7 Feb~~			~~18 Apr~~	~~31 Jan~~	~~29 Nov~~	~~9 May~~	~~16 May~~	~~14 Mar~~	~~28 Feb~~	2–0
Minor	~~3 Apr~~	~~31 Jan~~	~~14 Mar~~	~~18 Oct~~	~~16 May~~	~~17 Jan~~		~~6 Dec~~		~~25 Apr~~	~~28 Feb~~	~~11 Apr~~	~~1 Nov~~	1–2	2–3	2–2
Moerse Boys	~~25 Oct~~	~~24 May~~	2–2	~~14 Mar~~	1–0	~~28 Feb~~		~~8 Nov~~	~~13 Dec~~		~~18 Apr~~	~~7 Feb~~	~~29 Nov~~	~~24 Jan~~	0–2	~~3 Apr~~
Nuenen	~~22 Nov~~	~~6 Dec~~	~~7 Feb~~	0–2	~~21 Mar~~	~~18 Oct~~		~~24 May~~	1–1	3–5		~~31 Jan~~	~~7 Mar~~	~~11 Apr~~	~~8 Nov~~	~~9 May~~
OJC Rosmalen	~~28 Feb~~	~~3 Apr~~	~~25 Oct~~	~~18 Apr~~	~~24 Jan~~	~~16 May~~		~~13 Dec~~	~~29 Nov~~	~~1 Nov~~	2–1		~~25 Apr~~	2–2	3–1	~~15 Nov~~
Orion	~~8 Nov~~	~~9 May~~	~~18 Apr~~	~~17 Jan~~		~~3 Apr~~		~~22 Nov~~	~~24 May~~	~~21 Mar~~	3–1	~~6 Dec~~		~~28 Feb~~	~~25 Oct~~	~~31 Jan~~
TOGB	~~18 Apr~~	0–4	~~3 Apr~~	~~24 May~~	~~7 Feb~~	~~6 Dec~~		3–3	~~9 May~~	~~18 Oct~~	~~15 Nov~~	~~17 Jan~~	0–1		~~7 Mar~~	~~1 Nov~~
UDI '19	0–3	~~18 Oct~~	~~9 May~~	~~15 Nov~~	~~1 Nov~~	~~14 Mar~~		1–2	~~7 Feb~~	~~17 Jan~~	~~3 Apr~~	~~24 May~~	~~24 Jan~~	~~29 Nov~~		~~18 Apr~~
VOC	~~24 May~~	0–2	~~8 Nov~~	~~7 Feb~~	~~18 Oct~~	~~11 Apr~~		~~7 Mar~~	~~24 Jan~~	2–0	~~13 Dec~~	~~21 Mar~~	1–3	~~25 Apr~~	~~22 Nov~~	

Source: Soccerway
Legend: Blue = home team win; Yellow = draw; Red = away team win.
