= 2007–08 Hoofdklasse =

Hoofdklasse
- Season: 2007–08

The 2007–08 Hoofdklasse season was competed in six leagues, three Saturday leagues and three Sunday leagues. The champions of the three Saturday Hoofdklasse leagues will face each other after the regular season for the Dutch national Saturday amateur football title, the champions of the three Sunday leagues will face each other after the regular season for the national Sunday amateur football title. The Saturday and Sunday champions will then face each other for the national amateur football title.

== Final league standings ==
=== Saturday ===
==== Saturday Hoofdklasse A ====
Pos	Team	Pld	W	D	L	GF	GA	GD	Pts	Qualification or relegation
1	Lisse	26	17	5	4	54	27	+27	53 (Note: FC Lisse were docked three points for violence on the pitch during the match against Ter Leede in December 2007.)	Champion
2	Rijnsburgse Boys	26	12	11	3	55	28	+27	47	
3	Quick Boys	26	13	7	6	53	38	+15	46	
4	Capelle	26	11	7	8	39	30	+9	40	
5	DOTO	26	9	9	8	39	44	−5	36	
6	Katwijk	26	9	8	9	35	38	−3	34 (Note: VV Katwijk were docked one point for crowd trouble during the match against FC Lisse.)	
7	Noordwijk	26	9	7	10	42	33	+9	33 (Note: Noordwijk were docked one point for violence on the pitch during the match against Ter Leede.)	
8	Barendrecht	26	7	12	7	36	33	+3	33	
9	ASWH	26	8	9	9	42	45	−3	33	
10	Zwaluwen '30	26	8	7	11	47	64	−17	31	
11	Excelsior Maassluis	26	8	6	12	35	46	−11	30	
12	Ter Leede	26	7	10	9	25	32	−7	27 (Note: Ter Leede were docked four points during the season: three points for violence on the pitch during the match against FC Lisse in December 2007, and one point for violence on the pitch during the match against VV Noordwijk.)	Relegation playoffs
13	SHO	26	6	3	17	34	49	−15	21	Relegated to the 2008–09 Eerste Klasse
14	TOGR	26	4	7	15	31	60	−29	19	Relegated to the 2008–09 Eerste Klasse

==== Saturday Hoofdklasse B ====
Pos	Team	Pld	W	D	L	GF	GA	GD	Pts	Qualification or relegation
1	Spakenburg	26	16	8	2	73	25	+48	55 (Note: Spakenburg and Kloetinge were both deducted one point for violence on the pitch during their encounter in September 2007.)	Champion
2	Sparta Nijkerk	26	15	8	3	44	16	+28	53	
3	GVVV	26	15	5	6	52	25	+27	50	
4	Kozakken Boys	26	13	5	8	44	35	+9	44	
5	IJsselmeervogels	26	12	6	8	53	48	+5	42	
6	Hoek	26	12	4	10	35	28	+7	40	
7	DOVO	26	9	8	9	36	40	−4	35	
8	Geinoord	26	10	5	11	28	36	−8	35	
9	Bennekom	26	8	8	10	33	50	−17	32	
10	Ajax (amateurs)	26	7	8	11	29	44	−15	29	
11	Nunspeet	26	6	8	12	34	44	−10	26	
12	LRC Leerdam	26	6	7	13	33	46	−13	25	Relegation playoffs
13	Nivo Sparta	26	4	6	16	28	52	−24	18	Relegated to the 2008–09 Eerste Klasse
14	Kloetinge	26	3	6	17	16	49	−33	14	Relegated to the 2008–09 Eerste Klasse

==== Saturday Hoofdklasse C ====
Pos	Team	Pld	W	D	L	GF	GA	GD	Pts	Qualification or relegation
1	HHC Hardenberg	26	19	3	4	69	30	+39	60	Champion
2	Be Quick '28	26	16	7	3	51	22	+29	55	
3	ONS Sneek	26	11	8	7	42	36	+6	41	
4	Excelsior '31	26	12	5	9	45	41	+4	41	
5	Genemuiden	26	11	3	12	46	40	+6	36	
6	WHC	26	9	7	10	41	40	+1	34	
7	Flevo Boys	26	9	6	11	41	36	+5	33	
8	Go Ahead Kampen	26	9	5	12	35	39	−4	32	
9	PKC '83	26	9	5	12	47	56	−9	32	
10	Staphorst	26	10	2	14	38	47	−9	32	
11	Oranje Nassau	26	8	7	11	30	48	−18	31	
12	VVOG	26	8	7	11	33	56	−23	31	Relegation playoffs
13	ACV	26	6	8	12	34	40	−6	26	Relegated to the 2008–09 Eerste Klasse
14	DOS Kampen	26	5	7	14	29	50	−21	22	Relegated to the 2008–09 Eerste Klasse

=== Sunday ===
==== Sunday Hoofdklasse A ====
Pos	Team	Pld	W	D	L	GF	GA	GD	Pts	Qualification or relegation
1	Hollandia	26	17	3	6	44	20	+24	54	Champion
2	Argon	26	14	6	6	40	28	+12	48	
3	VVSB	26	13	6	7	38	29	+9	45	
4	Haaglandia	26	12	7	7	49	43	+6	43	
5	AFC	26	11	7	8	43	36	+7	40	
6	Omniworld (amateurs)	26	10	7	9	43	36	+7	37	
7	ADO '20	26	9	10	7	31	34	−3	37	
8	VUC	26	10	6	10	41	40	+1	36	
9	Türkiyemspor	26	9	8	9	50	48	+2	35	
10	Westlandia	26	9	8	9	39	37	+2	35	
11	Elinkwijk	26	10	5	11	38	37	+1	35	
12	DWV	26	9	6	11	29	36	−7	33	Relegation playoffs
13	DWS	26	3	6	17	17	42	−25	15	Relegated to the 2008–09 Eerste Klasse
14	DCV	26	2	3	21	16	52	−36	9	Relegated to the 2008–09 Eerste Klasse

==== Sunday Hoofdklasse B ====
Pos	Team	Pld	W	D	L	GF	GA	GD	Pts	Qualification or relegation
1	Deurne	26	15	6	5	45	22	+23	51	Champion
2	UNA	26	14	5	7	59	34	+25	47	
3	Papendrecht	26	12	9	5	43	30	+13	45	
4	Gemert	26	11	7	8	39	30	+9	40	
5	Baronie	26	11	7	8	43	38	+5	40	
6	Meerssen	26	10	6	10	37	43	−6	36	
7	DESK	26	10	6	10	44	52	−8	36	
8	EVV	26	9	8	9	55	42	+13	35	
9	JVC Cuijk	26	8	10	8	42	39	+3	34	
10	Dijkse Boys	26	8	7	11	38	52	−14	31	
11	OJC Rosmalen	26	4	16	6	29	35	−6	28	
12	Schijndel	26	6	7	13	28	36	−8	25	Relegation playoffs
13	UDI '19	26	4	10	12	27	47	−20	22	Relegated to the 2008–09 Eerste Klasse
14	Geldrop	26	5	6	15	32	61	−29	21	Relegated to the 2008–09 Eerste Klasse

==== Sunday Hoofdklasse C ====
Pos	Team	Pld	W	D	L	GF	GA	GD	Pts	Qualification or relegation
1	Achilles '29	26	18	7	1	59	22	+37	61	Champion
2	De Treffers	26	18	3	5	66	23	+43	57	
3	WKE	36	17	1	18	48	29	+19	52	
4	Lienden	26	14	8	4	47	28	+19	50	
5	HSC '21	26	12	8	6	47	34	+13	44	
6	Be Quick 1887	26	10	12	4	47	34	+13	42	
7	De Bataven	26	10	6	10	35	36	−1	36	
8	Babberich	26	8	7	11	41	41	0	31	
9	Quick '20	26	8	7	11	31	31	0	31	
10	Sneek Wit Zwart	26	8	4	14	33	49	−16	28	
11	WSV	26	6	5	15	42	56	−14	23	
12	SVBO	26	6	4	16	28	59	−31	22	Relegation playoffs
13	Rheden	26	5	2	19	25	62	−37	17	Relegated to the 2008–09 Eerste Klasse
14	SC Enschede	26	1	8	17	16	61	−45	11	Relegated to the 2008–09 Eerste Klasse

== National title ==
Location of Hoofdklasse 2007-08 champions. Overall champion FC Lisse bolded

=== National Saturday title ===
Pos	Team	Pld	W	D	L	GF	GA	GD	Pts	LIS	SPA	HHC
1	Lisse	4	3	1	0	15	5	+10	**10**		6–2	2–0
2	Spakenburg	4	1	2	1	8	10	−2	**5**	2–2		3–1
3	HHC Hardenberg	4	0	1	3	3	11	−8	**1**	1–5	1–1	

=== National Sunday title ===
Pos	Team	Pld	W	D	L	GF	GA	GD	Pts	HOL	ACH	DEU
1	Hollandia	4	3	0	1	7	2	+5	**9**		3–0	0–1
2	Achilles '29	4	2	0	2	7	5	+2	**6**	0–1		3–1
3	Deurne	4	1	0	3	3	10	−7	**3**	1–3	0–4	

=== National title ===
14 June 2008
Team 1	Score	Team 2
Lisse	**2–3**	**Hollandia**

21 June 2008
Team 1	Score	Team 2
Hollandia	**1–3**	**Lisse**

2007–08 Hoofdklasse winners

**1st title**
