= Jack van den Berg =

Dutch footballer and manager

Personal information
- Full name: Jack B. van den Berg
- Date of birth: 7 February 1959 (age 67)
- Place of birth: Kralingen, Rotterdam, Netherlands

Youth career
- Lombardijen
- Feyenoord

Senior career*
Years	Team	Apps	(Gls)
	Zwart-Wit '28	see 2nd run	
- Barendrecht
	Zwart-Wit '28	137 total	
- SC Feyenoord

Managerial career
- 1991–1996: Feyenoord (youth)
- 1996–2000: Zwart-Wit '28
- 2000–2001: SHO
- 2001–2006: ASWH
- 2006–2015: Barendrecht
- 2013–2016: IFC
- 2015–2018: ASWH
- 2016–2018: Poortugaal
- 2018: Katwijk
- 2019–2020: Barendrecht
- 2019–2021: IFC
- 2020–2023: VV Smitshoek (techn. coord.)
- 2023: Kruisland
- * Club domestic league appearances and goals

Jack B. van den Berg (born 7 February 1959) is a Dutch football manager and a former player. While coaching ASWH, he won the 2005 national amateur championship and the 2006 Rinus Michels Award for managers in nonprofessional leagues. During a long stint at BVV Barendrecht Van den Berg became a full-time coach. In 2015–2016 he coached the first squads of two small town rivals, promoting both ASWH to the Saturday Derde Divisie and IFC to the Sunday Hoofdklasse. From February until October 2018 he coached VV Katwijk, winning a Tweede Divisie championship.

== Playing career ==
Jack van den Berg was born in Kralingen, Rotterdam. He started playing at SV Lombardijen. He then played on youth teams of Feyenoord Rotterdam.

Throughout the 1980s, Van den Berg played for Zwart-Wit '28. During Van den Berg's year in Zwart-Wit's top team, he played mostly in the Eerste Klasse, with a few years in the Tweede Klasse.

Eventually Van den Berg moved to Barendrecht, where he played for the local BVV. He then returned to Zwart-Wit, achieving a total number of caps (first and second run) of 137 in leagues, 22 cup games, and 144 friendly games. He finished his football player career at SC Feyenoord as the team captain.

== Coaching career ==
=== 1991–2001: Feyenoord youth; Zwart-Wit '28 and SHO relegations ===
Van den Berg started coaching Feyenoord Rotterdam youth teams in the summer of 1991 and continued until the summer of 1996.

In his first major coaching assignment, Van den Berg coached Zwart-Wit '28 in Hoofdklasse A. In 2000 the team ended 13th and relegated to Eerste Klasse B.

During the subsequent season, Jack van den Berg coached VV SHO from Oud-Beijerland. Exactly like Zwart-Wit a year before, the team ended the competition in Hoofdklasse A in place 13 and relegated to Eerste Klasse B.

=== 2001–2006: ASWH national amateur champion; Michels Award ===
Van den Berg again remained in the Hoofdklasse, where he took on coaching Hendrik-Ido-Ambacht-side ASWH. In the 2001–2002 season, he led the team to their second consecutive championship in the Hoofdklasse, and their first championship in Hoofdklasse A. Right above Hoofdklasse at that time was professional football so the costs of promotion were prohibitive for a small town team. In 2003 and 2004 his team ended third and eighth respectively.

In 2005 Van den Berg won once more the championship of Hoofdklasse A with ASWH. ASWH went on to win the Dutch Championship Saturday Soccer and the Dutch Championship Amateur Soccer. In 2006 Van den Berg led his players to the second place. That year he was selected as "coach of the year" among all coaches of Dutch amateurs teams, a prize that is also known as the Rinus Michels Award, after already being nominated for the prize one year before.

=== 2006–2015: BVV Barendrecht to Topklasse; full-time coach ===
From 2006 to 2015 Van den Berg trained BVV Barendrecht, where he had previous played (his other soccer club, Zwart-Wit '28, folded in 2004). Van den Berg started his nine years at BVV with a championship in Eerste Klasse 1B, leading the Barendrecht-side back to Hoofdklasse, from where it had relegated two years earlier.

In 2010, Van den Berg led BVV to the championship of Hoofdklasse A, promoting Barendrecht for the first time to the Topklasse. Towards the end of his years at BVV Barendrecht, he started coaching IFC alongside BVV. Coaching two teams, that played and trained at different days, allowed Van den Berg to commit henceforth all his time to soccer.

=== 2015–2018: ASWH to Derde Divisie; IFC to Hoofdklasse ===
Since 2015, Jack van den Berg coached ASWH again instead of BVV, promoting ASWH 1 right away, in the season 2015–2016, to the Derde Divisie. That very same season he promoted the next door soccer club and small town rival, IFC, to the Hoofdklasse.

In the fall of 2016, ASWH is consistently in the top-5 tier of the Derde Divisie. In the Cup, ASWH beat Chevremont, RVVH, De Treffers, and SV Spakenburg. In October 2016 Van den Berg's contract with ASWH was extended until 2019. In December that year he signed to coach PSV Poortugaal alongside ASWH, instead of IFC.

=== 2018: Tweede Divisie championship with VV Katwijk; break ===
In February 2018 Van den Berg was appointed trainer of Tweede Klasse-side VV Katwijk, replacing Dick Schreuder who had joined the technical staff at Philadelphia Union in January. ASWH released Van den Berg from the remainder of his contract to pursue this opportunity.

In his first game at Katwijk, Van den Berg's team was beaten 1–0 by GVVV in Veenendaal. In April, the team manager of first squad, Sander Molenaar, died. The conclusion of the season, however, was sweet: a championship with Katwijk in Van den Berg's first season coaching Tweede Klasse. The championship was dedicated to Molenaar. There was no promotion (nor relegation) that season between Eerste and Tweede Divisie.

Early October 2018 Van den Berg left Katwijk after the club ranked fifth in the competition. He was replaced by Jan Zoutman, who won the Rinus Michels Award a year before Van den Berg. In November 2018 Van den Berg said he already refused a new team and that he considers his options carefully. Meanwhile, Katwijk kept paying his salary.

=== 2019–2023: Relegation BVV; IFC again; Smitshoek; Kruisland ===
On 13 December 2018, Van den Berg's signed with BVV Barendrecht. He took on the challenge to keep Barendrecht in the Tweede Divisie. Van den Berg started coaching his former team on 2 January 2019. On 21 April 2019, he managed to gain a point against the champion and his former trainees at VV Katwijk. BVV relegated to the Derde Divisie.

In 2019–20 Van den Berg is back at coaching IFC that managed to remain in the Hoofdklasse under Robert Verbeek. By the time the competition was broken off, IFC had reached the third position from where it would have qualified for the playoff for Derde Divisie.

Barendrecht had a slow start in the fall of 2019. In December 2019 it was decided that Van den Berg's contract would not be extended. By the end of January 2019, BVV ascended to 6th position, with Van den Berg still coaching. When the COVID-19 pandemic in the Netherlands broke out and the league was stopped, BVV was ranked 7th in de Derde Divisie.

In May 2020 Van den Berg was reportedly considered as the next manager for Feyenoord U21. He wasn't selected. In the end, he signed for technical coordinator of Barendrecht's other club, VV Smitshoek, leading the youth teams and second squad. In 2021 he finished his second run at IFC as the club could no longer afford him.

In 2023, he left Smitshoek and joined Kruisland. The stint did not last.

== Personal life ==
Jack's father, Bas, was a Dutch football referee. Jack's mother died when she was 50 years old. Bas van den Berg died on 18 January 2020.

With his wife Marianne they are parents to two children.
