= 2005–06 Eerste Klasse =

Eerste Klasse
- Season: 2005–6
- Relegated: 2006–07 Tweede Klasse

2005–06 Eerste Klasse was a Dutch association football season of the Eerste Klasse.

Saturday champions were:

- A: SV Huizen
- B: TOGR
- C: SSV '65
- D: VV Nunspeet
- E: Oranje Nassau Groningen

Sunday champions were:

- A: HVV Hollandia
- B: VUC Den Haag
- C: Blauw Geel '38
- D: RKSV Groene Ster
- E: SC Enschede
- F: Meppeler Sport Club
