= Hurşut Meriç =

Dutch footballer (born 1983)

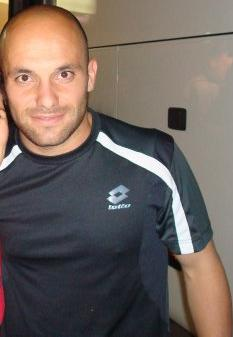

Personal information
- Date of birth: 31 July 1983 (age 43)
- Place of birth: Amsterdam, Netherlands
- Height: 1.72 m (5 ft 8 in)
- Position: Left winger

Senior career*
| Years | Team | Apps | (Gls) |
- Türkiyemspor
| 2007–2009 | ADO Den Haag | 50 | (6) |
| 2009–2013 | Gençlerbirliği | 122 | (15) |
| 2013–2014 | Çaykur Rizespor | 11 | (0) |
| 2014–2015 | Adana Demirspor | 25 | (1) |
| 2015–2016 | Bandırmaspor | 27 | (2) |
| 2016–2017 | Karacabey Belediyespor | 35 | (7) |
| 2017–2018 | Cizrespor | 30 | (2) |
- * Club domestic league appearances and goals as of 2018

Hurşut Meriç (born 31 July 1983) is a Dutch former professional footballer who played as a left winger.

== Career ==
Born in Amsterdam, Meriç has played for Türkiyemspor, ADO Den Haag, Gençlerbirliği, Çaykur Rizespor, Adana Demirspor, Karacabey Belediyespor and Cizrespor.

While playing for Türkiyemspor he won the Hoofdklasse title, as well as the KNVB Amateur Cup.
