= Kenny Elders =

Dutch footballer (born 1995)

Personal information
- Date of birth: 1 February 1995 (age 31)
- Place of birth: Boxmeer, Netherlands
- Height: 1.75 m (5 ft 9 in)
- Position: Left back

Youth career
- –2005: Vitesse '08
- 2005–2009: NEC
- 2009–2014: NEC/FC Oss

Senior career*
Years	Team	Apps	(Gls)
2014–2015	NEC	0	(0)
2015–2017	Achilles '29	37	(0)
2017–2018	Lienden	46	(0)
2020–2021	DUNO	7	(0)
- * Club domestic league appearances and goals as of 24 January 2019

Kenny Elders (born 1 February 1995) is a Dutch retired football player.

== Club career ==
He came through the NEC youth set-up before joining Achilles '29 and made his professional debut in the Eerste Divisie for Achilles '29 on 7 August 2015 in a game against Jong Ajax. After the club was relegated to the Tweede Divisie in 2017, Elders left them for FC Lienden. He left Lienden again at the end of 2018.

At the end of 2019 it was confirmed, that Eldars would join VV DUNO from 2020, but he retired after a year and started his own personal training facility in Nijmegen.
