= Türkiyemspor =

Türkiyemspor may refer to:

- Türkiyemspor Berlin
- Türkiyemspor Amsterdam
