= Deurne =

Deurne may refer to:

- Deurne, Belgium, a district of the city of Antwerp, Belgium
- Antwerp International Airport, located in the Antwerp district of Deurne, Belgium and colloquially named after it
- Deurne, Netherlands, a municipality in North Brabant, Netherlands
- SV Deurne, a football club based in Deurne, North Brabant
