= Dwight Eli =

Dutch footballer

Personal information
- Date of birth: 11 November 1982 (age 43)
- Place of birth: Rotterdam, Netherlands
- Position: Defender

Youth career
- Zwart-Wit '28

Senior career*
| Years | Team | Apps | (Gls) |
| 2000–2001 | Zwart-Wit '28 | 12 | |
| 2001–2003 | Sparta | 22 | (0) |
| 2003–2013 | SC Feyenoord | | |
| 2013–2017 | TOGB | | |
| 2017–? | RSCV Zestienhoven | | |
- * Club domestic league appearances and goals

Dwight Eli (born 11 November 1982) is a Dutch former footballer who played for Sparta Rotterdam in the Eredivisie and Eerste Divisie.

== Club career ==
Eli made his professional debut in the Eredivisie, on 28 April 2002 for Sparta under coach Frank Rijkaard against PSV. On 5 May that year he played a home game against FC Groningen. Next season, in the Eerste Divisie, he played 16 matches.

Eli continued his career with a long spell at the amateur branch of Feyenoord, SC Feyenoord. He finished his player career at TOGB and RSCV Zestienhoven.
