= Hamza Boukhari =

Dutch footballer

Personal information
- Date of birth: 28 March 1995 (age 31)
- Place of birth: The Hague, Netherlands
- Height: 1.78 m (5 ft 10 in)
- Position: Midfielder

Youth career
- 2007–2012: Haaglandia
- 2012–2014: FC Utrecht

Senior career*
Years	Team	Apps	(Gls)
2014–2017	Jong FC Utrecht	68	(17)
2017–2018	Quick Boys	14	(1)
2018–2019	RKAVV		
2019–2020	TAC '90		
- * Club domestic league appearances and goals as of 28 August 2018

Hamza Boukhari (born 28 March 1995) is a Dutch football player of Moroccan descent who plays for TAC '90.

== Club career ==
He made his professional debut in the Eerste Divisie for Jong FC Utrecht on 5 August 2016 in a game against NAC. He went on to play for amateur sides Quick Boys, RKAVV, TAC '90 Laakkwartier and GSC/ESDO.

He has also played futsal in the Dutch top division for ZVV Den Haag.

== Personal life ==
He is a second cousin of former Ajax player Nourdin Boukhari.
