= Dennis van der Ree =

Dutch footballer

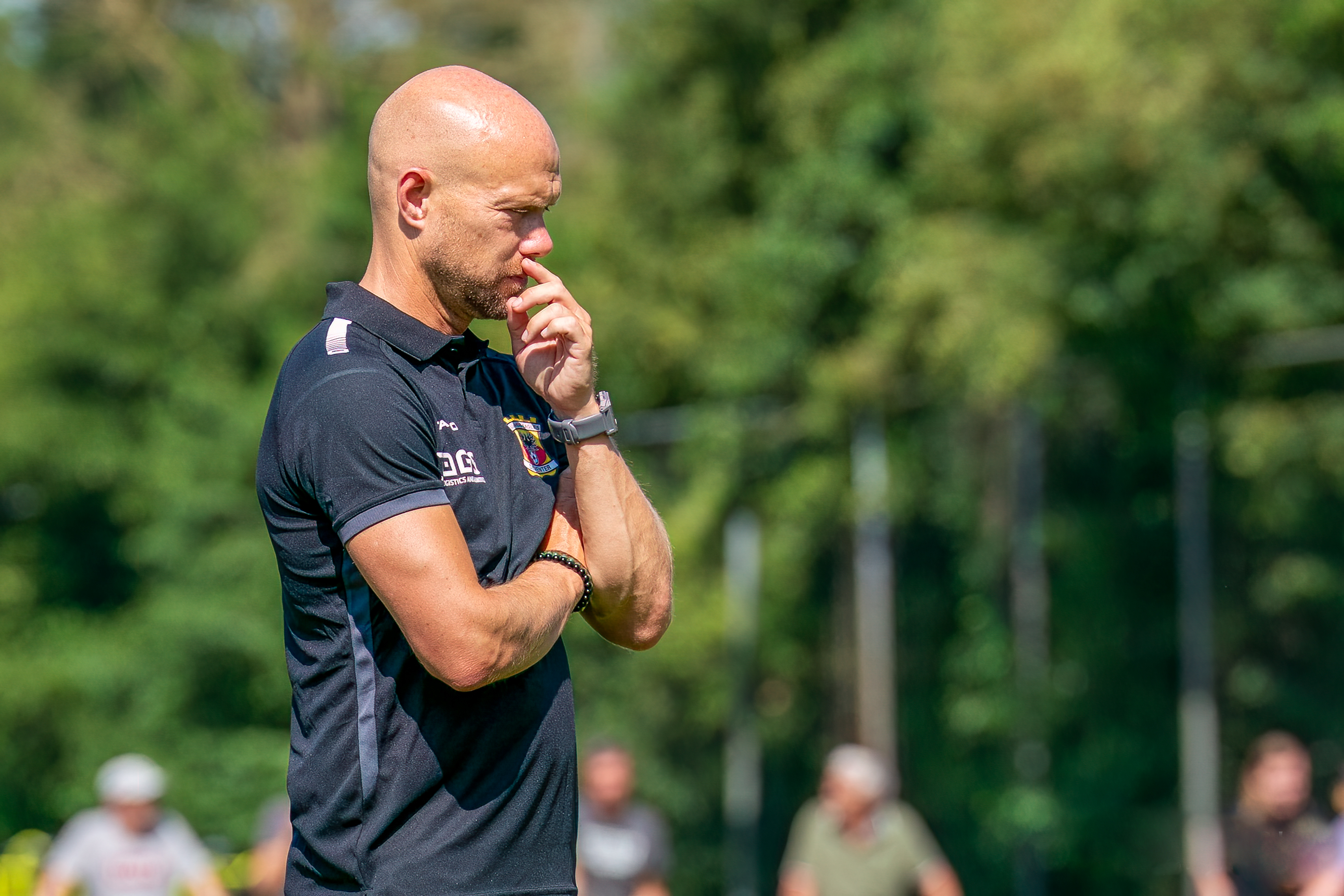
- Dennis van der Ree managing Groningen in 2023.

Personal information
- Date of birth: 19 April 1979 (age 47)
- Place of birth: Rotterdam, Netherlands
- Height: 1.74 m (5 ft 8 1/2 in)
- Position: Right back

Youth career
- Zwart Wit '28
- Feyenoord
- BVV Barendrecht

Senior career*
Years	Team	Apps	(Gls)
1997–1999	Utrecht	29	(0)
1999–2000	NAC	23	(0)
2000–2002	Utrecht	8	(0)
2002–2003	VV SHO	?	(?)
2003–2007	AGOVV	101	(0)
2007–2012	Cambuur	68	(1)
2012	AGOVV	5	(0)

Managerial career
- 2013–2017: Blauw Wit '34
- 2015–2019: Cambuur (U21)
- 2017–2019: Cambuur (assistant)
- 2019–2020: Twente (assistant)
- 2021–2022: Feyenoord (video analyst)
- 2022: Groningen (assistant)
- 2022–2023: Groningen (caretaker)
- 2023: Groningen
- * Club domestic league appearances and goals

Dennis van der Ree (born 19 April 1979) is a Dutch football coach and former player.

== Playing career ==
A right back, his first professional club was FC Utrecht, where he played from 1997 until 2002, one exception was the 1999–2000 season where he played with NAC Breda. He left for the amateurs and played with SHO, returning to professional football the following season. He played for four years, from 2003 until 2007, for AGOVV Apeldoorn. He then played for SC Cambuur from 2007 to 2012, retiring after a short stint at AGOVV Apeldoorn.

== Coaching career ==
In June 2022, he was unveiled as a new assistant coach at FC Groningen. On 2 December 2022, following the dismissal of Frank Wormuth as head coach, FC Groningen announced to have appointed van der Ree as a head coach on an interim basis. He was confirmed as permanent head coach until the end of the 2022–23 season on 2 January 2023. On 20 March, it was confirmed that he would leave the club at the end of the season, which eventually ended in relegation.
