= Jos van Eck =

Dutch footballer (born 1963)

Personal information
- Date of birth: 2 May 1963 (age 63)
- Place of birth: Rotterdam, Netherlands
- Height: 6 ft 1 in (1.85 m)
- Position: Defender

Team information
- Current team: Jong Sparta (team manager)

Youth career
- Excelsior
- Spartaan '20
- Unitas

Senior career*
| Years | Team | Apps | (Gls) |
| 1987–1989 | De Graafschap | 52 | (9) |
| 1989–1990 | PEC Zwolle | 41 | (7) |
| 1990–1993 | BVV Den Bosch | 91 | (13) |
| 1993–1995 | Sparta | 41 | (5) |
| 1995–1996 | KFC Tielen | | |
| 1996–1997 | Rozenburg | | |
| 1997–1998 | Groote Lindt | | |
| 1998–1999 | Dordrecht | 1 | (0) |

Managerial career
- 2002–2003: FC Dordrecht
- 2009–2011: Sparta (assistant)
- 2011: Sparta
- 2011–2012: Quick Boys
- 2013: CVV Zwervers
- * Club domestic league appearances and goals

Jos van Eck (born 2 May 1963) is a Dutch former football manager and player. He is team manager of Jong Sparta, the under-21 team of Sparta Rotterdam.

== Playing career ==
Van Eck played for De Graafschap, FC Zwolle, FC Den Bosch, Sparta Rotterdam, KFC Tielen and FC Dordrecht. He also had a controversial stint at amateur side Rozenburg after he got relegated from the highest amateur level with Groote Lindt a year earlier.

== Managerial career ==
After retirement, he worked as an assistant coach, then manager at FC Dordrecht before Robert Verbeek took over in January 2004. After leaving FC Dordrecht, he worked as an assistant coach at Sparta Rotterdam for seven years before taking over as manager when Jan Everse resigned on 24 February 2011. Van Eck continued as manager until the end of the season when Michel Vonk was appointed on a permanent basis. He later worked as a coach at amateur sides Quick Boys and Zwervers.

On 23 June 2021, Van Eck was appointed team manager of Jong Sparta, the under-21 team of Sparta Rotterdam, a position where he would oversee practicalities regarding the team.

== Personal life ==
His brother René played professional football in Holland and Switzerland.

Van Eck's wife Lindsey died of breast cancer in 2020. Together they had a daughter, Abbygail.
