= Nedim Imaç =

Turkish-Dutch businessman and sports executive (1966–2007)

Nedim Imaç (born 1966 in The Hague - died February 17, 2007, in Amsterdam) was a Turkish-Dutch businessman and sports executive. He was the former chairman of the Amsterdam football club Türkiyemspor and a prominent face of the Turkish community in the Netherlands. He was also one of the important leaders of the Turkish heroin mafia in the Netherlands. He was murdered in a drive-by shooting on 17 February 2007 as part of a gangland dispute.
