= Zwart-Wit '28 =

- Full name: Rotterdamse Christelijke Voetbalvereniging Zwart-Wit 1928
- Nickname: Feyenoord van Zaterdagvoetbal [Feyenoord of Saturday Football]
- Founded: 1 May 1928; 98 years ago
- Dissolved: 24 February 2004
- Ground: De Vaan
- Chairman: Izak Groenewegen (first) Wim van den Heuvel (10 years); Cor Vaandrager (10 years) Jan Oorebeek (last)
- Chief Coach: Loe van der Hoeven (9 seasons, 3 championships) Wim van der Gijp (6 seasons, 3 championships) Wim Schouten (last)
- League: Hoofdklasse (women); Hoofdklasse (men)
- Website: zwartwit28.nl

RCVV Zwart-Wit '28 (full name: Rotterdamse Christelijke Voetbalvereniging Zwart-Wit 1928) was a Dutch Saturday football club from Rotterdam, dubbed the "Feyenoord of Saturday Football". Its women's team won the 2000 National Women's Cup then played in the Hoofdklasse. Its men's team won the National Amateur Championship in 1971, then played in the Hoofdklasse.

== History ==
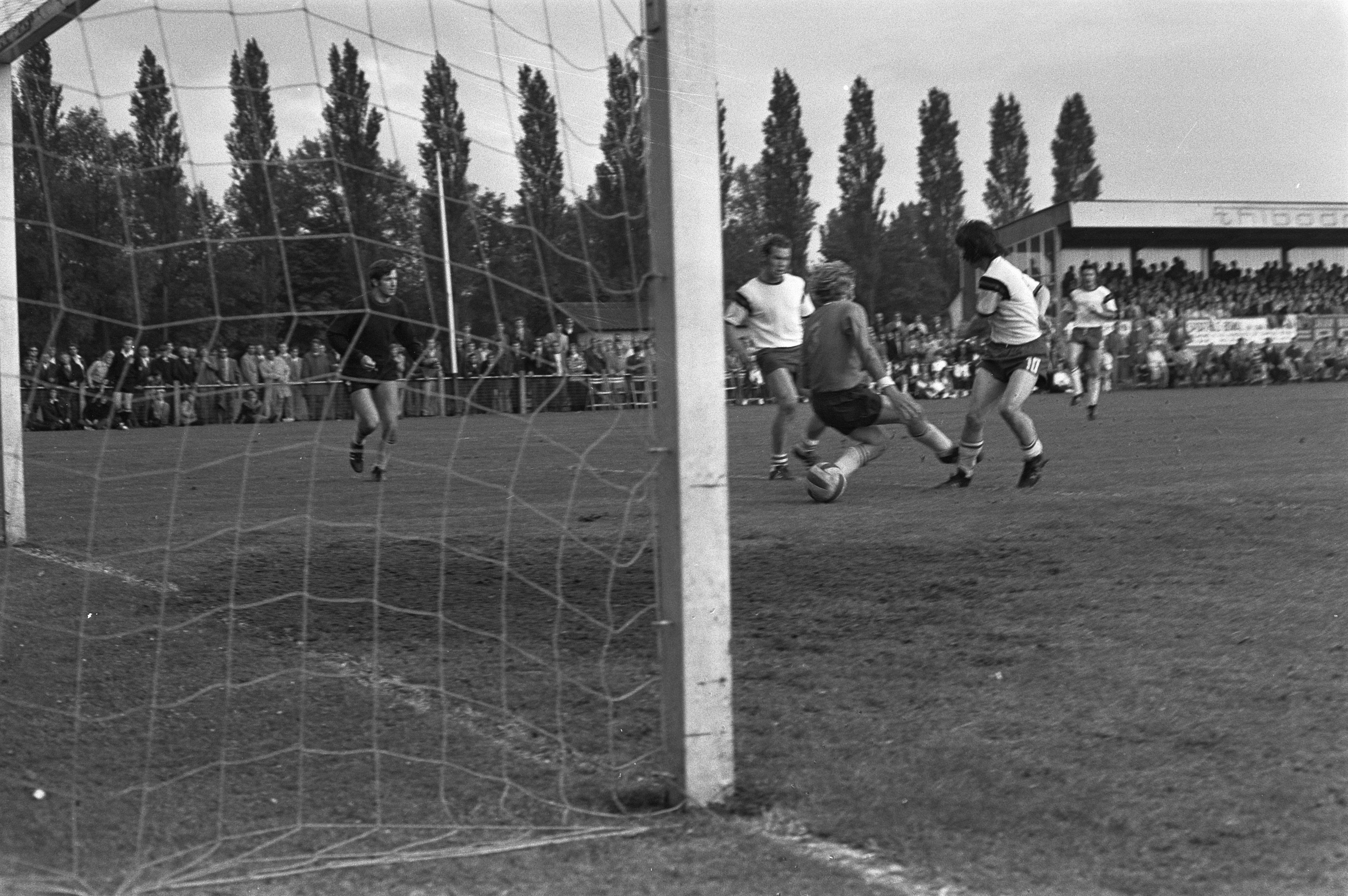
Match National Amateur Championship 1972 against Sparta '25

=== Initial years (1928-1939) ===
Zwart-Wit was established on 1 May 1928. The men's first squad played in the 1920s and 1930 in the second division of the CNVB Rotterdam.

=== Rise and National Amateur Championship (1940–1999) ===
In 1942 the club promoted to the first division of the CNVB Rotterdam and in 1946 to the Vierde Klasse of the KNVB. In 1956 Zwart-Wit ascended to the Derde Klasse and 1958 to the Tweede Klasse.

In 1971 the men promoted to Eerste Klasse where they played until 1996, except for three seasons back in the Tweede Klasse. In 1971 Zwart-Wit also won the National Amateur Championship, beating Huizen, the Sunday Champion, 2–1. It has previously secured the National Saturday Football Championship of the Netherlands. Zwart-Wit repeated the National Saturday Championship in 1972.

The women's section was started in 1971.

In 1996 the Zwart-Wit '28 male squad became a Hoofdklasse team.

=== National Women's Cup and collapse (2000–2004) ===
In 2000 the women's first squad won the national KNVB Women's Cup, beating Saestum in the national finals, 4–2. For Zwart Wit scored Sandra Roos (3) and Sandra Muller (1).

In 2001 the men won the District Cup West IV. In 2002 they lost against HFC Haarlem in the KNVB Cup, 5–2.

Zwart-Wit 28 went bankrupt on 24 February 2004 due to high (amateur) player salaries, dwindling interest in games, and mismanagement. While rumors on a possible merger still circulated in its final year, the situation deteriorated such that it had to pull its teams from their divisions. Next the club house burned down and nothing was left but to declare bankruptcy. The rise and downfall of the once successful club, dubbed "Feyenoord of Saturday soccer", continued to draw media attention for many years after.

== Players ==
=== Men first squad ===
The footballers that played most games in the first squad were:

1. Cees Wander
2. Ed Molsbergen
3. Adrie Wander
4. Cees Boon
5. Jan Nieuwstraten – played most (30) international games, then coached

=== Women first squad ===
- Sandra Muller – scored most (9) international goals
- Sandra Roos – scored three goals in the national cup victory
- Shirley Smith – runner up international games (60) and goals (5)
- Sandra van Tol – played most (82) international games

Other players of note include:

- Jack van den Berg (#17 in play frequency) – in 2018 a Tweede Divisie coach
- Leo Beenhakker (#228) – later national coach of the Netherlands, Poland, Saudi Arabia and Trinidad and coach of Ajax, Feyenoord and Real Madrid
- Dwight Eli (#242) – youth and 1st squad player, briefly professional at Sparta
- John de Wolf (#331) – ex-professional, briefly coach–player in 2000
- Dennis van der Ree – youth player at Zwart-Wit '28, later turned professional
- Erik Tammer

== Staff ==
=== Head coach ===
Coached three years and more:

- Chris Bernaards (1948–1951)
- Loë van der Hoeven (1954–1964)
- Piet Boekee (1964–1968)
- Wim van der Gijp (1969–1973)
- Jan Nieuwstraten (1974–1977)
- Coen Nieuwstraten (1979–1983)
- Jan van Baaren (1983–1986)
- Wim van der Gijp (1987–1988)
- Frank Franken (1989–1993)
- Berry Janse (1993–1996)
- Jack van den Berg (1996–2000)

Last coaches were:

- Hans Helleman and John de Wolf (2000)
- Philip den Haan (2000–2002)
- Louis Olofsen (2002)
- Gijs Zwaan (2002)
- Jan Everse (2002–2003)
- Wim Schouten (2003–2004)

=== Chairperson ===
Chaired three years and more:

- Izak Groenewegen (1928–1934)
- Wim van den Heuvel (1934–1935; 1937–1946)
- Wim Kool (1950–1958)
- Koen Zonnevylle (1958–1962)
- Cor Vaandrager (1962–1972)
- Dick Marseille (1972–1976)
- Henny Troost (1976–1980)
- Henk van den Berg (1980–1985)
- Joop Dekkers (1988–1992)
- Wim Nuis (1994–1998)
- Rick Bergen (1999–2003)

Last chairman was:

- Jan Oorebeek (2003–2004)

=== Honorary Chairperson ===
- Izak Groenewegen (1937)
- Wim van den Heuvel (1953)
- Henny Troost (1980)
