= 's-Gravenweg 168, Kralingen =

Dutch National Historical Site

Coordinates: 51°55′25″N 4°31′25″E

's-Gravenweg 168, Kralingen, Rotterdam is a Louis XIV-XV façade house ca. 1850 that is classified as a Dutch National Heritage Site (number: 32911).

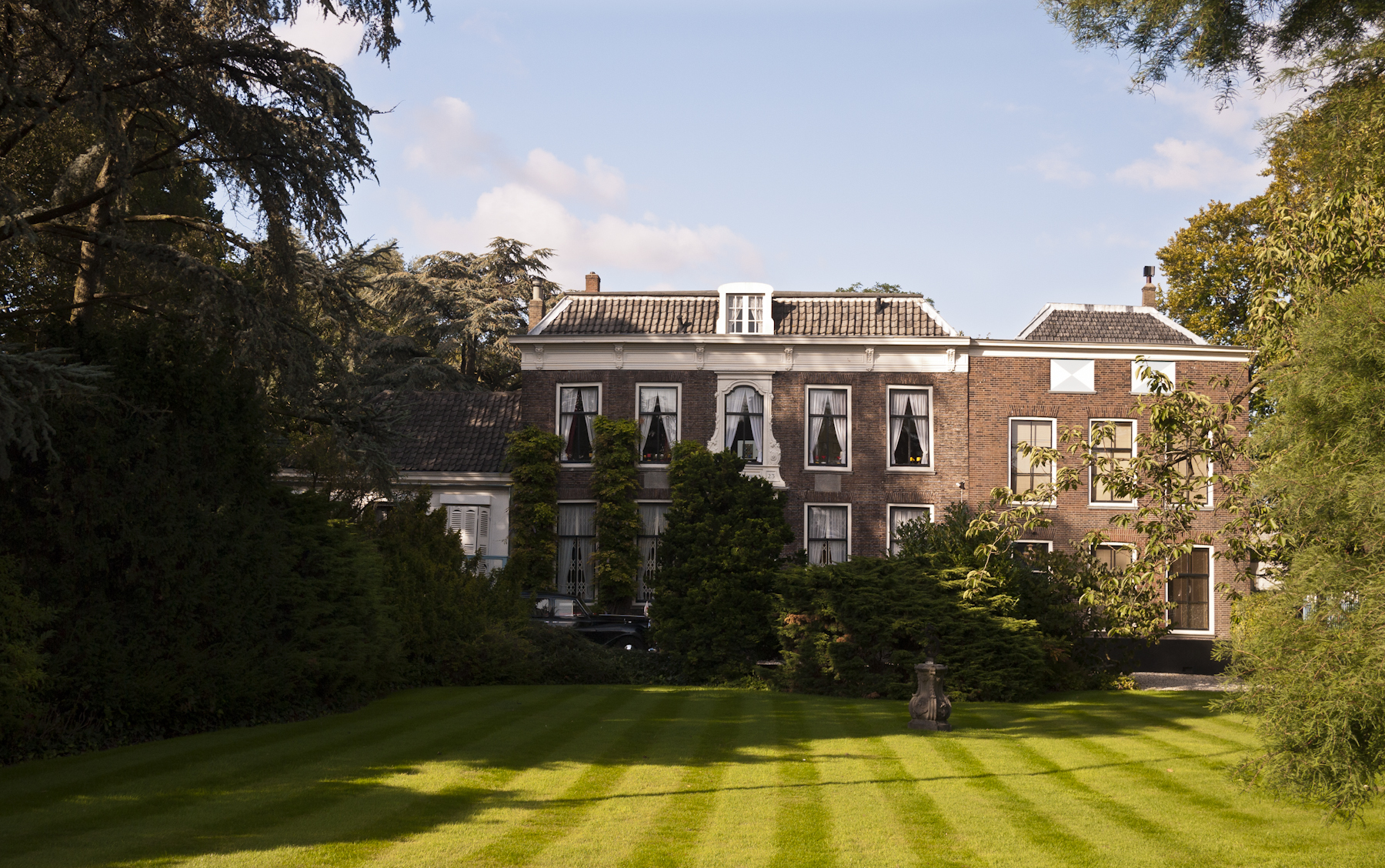
's-Gravenweg 168, Kralingen
