= Winston Faerber =

Surinamese footballer (born 1971)

Personal information
- Date of birth: 27 March 1971 (age 55)
- Place of birth: Paramaribo, Suriname
- Height: 1.77 m (5 ft 9 1/2 in)
- Position: Full back

Youth career
- VCS
- Robin Hood

Senior career*
| Years | Team | Apps | (Gls) |
| 1994–1999 | ADO Den Haag | 147 | (6) |
| 1999–2000 | Cardiff City | 33 | (1) |
| 2000–2004 | FC Den Bosch | 127 | (0) |
| 2004–2006 | Deltasport | | |
| 2007–2007 | TOGR | | |
| Total | | 307 | (7) |

Managerial career
- 2012–2013: TAC '90
- * Club domestic league appearances and goals

Winston Faerber (born 27 March 1971) is a Dutch retired footballer, born in Suriname.

== Club career ==
Faerber began his career at FC Den Haag, later renamed ADO Den Haag. He made his professional debut for the club at the age of 23 when he played in a 3–1 defeat against TOP Oss. He established himself in the first team and played over 150 games for the club over the next 5 years.

In 1999, Faerber left Den Haag on a free transfer to play for Cardiff City, making his debut in a 1–1 draw with Millwall. Faerber was a regular for the side, playing in over 30 league games as well as making appearances in both the FA Cup and League Cup. His only goal for the club came in his second league appearance in a 3–2 win over Oxford United. Despite this Faerber struggled to settle at the club and with his family homesick he was released from his contract at the club and returned to the Netherlands to sign for FC Den Bosch where he finished his professional career before moving into amateur football.

He spent his final playing days at clubs such as Deltasport and TOGR, where he reunited with his brother Jurgen who had a short spell at ADO Den Haag.

As a coach he worked for several amateur clubs in The Hague, most recently BMT.

== Honours ==
Den Bosch

- Eerste Divisie: 2003–04
