= 2008–09 Eerste Klasse =

Eerste Klasse
- Season: 2008–9
- Relegated: 2009–10 Tweede Klasse

2008–09 Eerste Klasse was a Dutch association football season of the Eerste Klasse.

Saturday champions were:

- A: ODIN '59
- B: TOGR
- C: LRC Leerdam
- D: CSV Apeldoorn
- E: ACV Assen

Sunday champions were:

- A: FC Chabab
- B: SC Feyenoord
- C: SV OSS '20
- D: UDI '19
- E: Juliana '31
- F: VV Nieuw Buinen
