= TAC '90 =

Dutch football club

- Founded: 9 November 1990; 34 years ago
- Ground: Sportpark De Verlichting
- Capacity: 1,000
- Chairman: Raymond Kharagjitsing
- Head coach: Mario Koswal
- League: Hoofdklasse
- 2020–21: Eerste Klasse Sunday, West II, 2nd (promoted)
- Website: https://www.tac90.nl/
Home colours

Takdier Boys–Amardeep Combinatie 1990 is an association football club from The Hague, Netherlands. In 2020–21, its Sunday first squad plays for the first time in the Hoofdklasse and Saturday first squad plays in the Vierde Klasse.

== History ==
TAC '90 was founded on 9 November 1990 as a union of two Indo-Surinamese immigrant clubs, Takdier Boys and Amardeep. In its first season it played at the Machiel Vrijenhoeklaan in Kijkduin. The next season it moved its facilities to the Aagje Dekenlaan in Moerwijk. Until 2005 it shared the grounds with SCSV De Ster. On 9 November 2013, the day TAC '90 celebrated its 23rd birthday, the home grounds were renamed Sportpark De Verlichting (Dutch for Enlightenment).

In 2016, the Saturday squad relegated to the Vierde Klasse. In 2019 the Sunday squad won a section championship in Tweede Klasse C and promoted to the Eerste Klasse. One year later, it promoted for very the first time to the Hoofdklasse from a runner-up position to TOGB, at season termination due to the COVID-19 pandemic in the Netherlands. In preparation for the 2020–21 season, TAC Sunday won 1–0 against SV Nootdoorp, then got beaten 4–1 by Ido's Football Club.

=== Chief coach ===
==== Saturday ====
- Patrick Pershad (2013–2015)
- Frank Lefeber (2015)
- Wim Baggerman (2015–2017)
- Sunil Kalloe (2017–2019)
- Muhreli Sahin (2019–2020)
- Mario Koswal (2020)
- Tahir Mohamed (since 2020)

===== Sunday =====
- Patrick Pershad (2006–2009)
- Theo Verbeek (2009–2010)
- Patrick Pershad (2010–2012)
- Winston Faerber (2012–2013)
- Faizal Soekhai (2013–2015)
- Melbi Raboen (2015)
- Stephan van der Steen (2015)
- John Baven (2015–2017)
- Mario Koswal (since 2017)

=== Players ===
- Hamza Boukhari (since 2019)
