= John de Wolf =

Dutch footballer (born 1962)

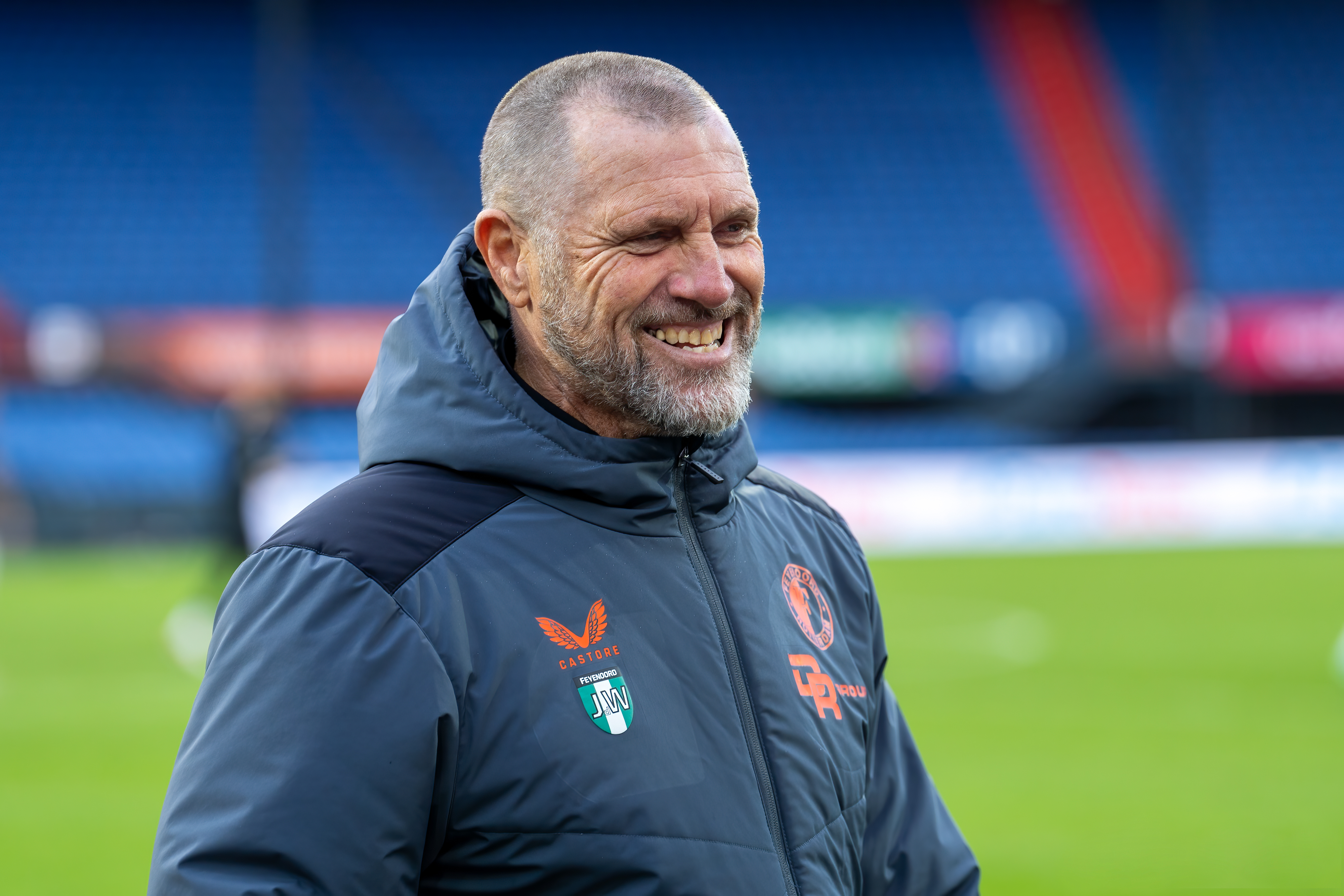
- John de Wolf in 2023

Personal information
- Full name: Johannes Hildebrand de Wolf
- Date of birth: 10 December 1962 (age 63)
- Place of birth: Schiedam, Netherlands
- Height: 6 ft 2 in (1.88 m)
- Position: Centre back

Team information
- Current team: Feyenoord (assistant)

Youth career
- Schiedamse Boys
- Sparta Rotterdam

Senior career*
Years	Team	Apps	(Gls)
1983–1985	Sparta Rotterdam	58	(4)
1985–1989	Groningen	112	(5)
1989–1994	Feyenoord	111	(9)
1994–1996	Wolverhampton Wanderers	28	(5)
1996–1997	VVV-Venlo	30	(6)
1997–1998	Hapoel Ashkelon	3	(0)
1998–2000	Helmond Sport	44	(3)
2000	Zwart-Wit '28		
Total		386	(32)

International career
1987–1994	Netherlands	6	(2)

Managerial career
- 2000: Zwart-Wit '28 (player-manager)
- 2000–2002: RKSV Halsteren
- 2002–2005: SVVSMC
- 2005–2007: Haaglandia
- 2007–2008: Türkiyemspor
- 2009: Voorschoten '97
- 2009–2010: WKE
- 2012–2014: Sliedrecht
- 2013–2014: Sparta Rotterdam (assistant)
- 2014: Sparta Rotterdam (caretaker)
- 2015: Excelsior Maassluis
- 2015–2017: GVVV
- 2017–2019: Spakenburg
- 2019–: Feyenoord (assistant)
- * Club domestic league appearances and goals

Johannes Hildebrand de Wolf (born 10 December 1962) is a Dutch former professional footballer who played as a defender. He earned six caps for the Netherlands national team, scoring two goals.

== Career ==
=== Club ===
De Wolf was born in Schiedam. He began his professional career with Sparta Rotterdam, making his senior debut in 1983. After two seasons in the team, he departed for Groningen where he continued to impress and won a call-up to the Netherlands national team in 1987.

The defender moved on to Feyenoord in 1989 and after a season outside their first team, he settled into the side and won the Dutch league championship in 1992–93 with the club. During a stay of four full seasons he also won three Dutch Cups, a Johan Cruyff Shield and made it to the 91–92 Cup Winners' Cup semi-final, which they lost on away goals against Monaco.

He left for English First Division (second tier) side Wolverhampton Wanderers in December 1994 for £600,000. He was swiftly made captain of the side by manager Graham Taylor, and helped them reach the FA Cup quarter-finals, as well as remarkably scoring a hat-trick from centre-back in one game against Port Vale. However, he soon suffered a knee injury that ruled him out of the promotion run-in, where the team would ultimately lose to Bolton in the play-offs.

The following season, however, he missed most games as Wolves finished a lowly 20th in the final table. The Dutchman fell out with new manager Mark McGhee who attempted to select him for the reserve side, only for De Wolf to speak out and claim that he should not be fielded in the reserves as he was an experienced player who had not been injured. He left the club soon afterwards and returned to his homeland with VVV-Venlo of the second division.

After a solitary season back in his native land with VVV, he once again moved abroad, joining Israeli side Hapoel Ashkelon in 1997. He failed to adapt though and made only three appearances – scoring an own goal in his final game – before quickly returning to Dutch football with Helmond Sport in the second flight. He had a strained personal relationship with the club, though, and both parties agreed to terminate his contract during his second season. De Wolf instead ended the campaign with a short spell as player-manager of amateur side Zwart-Wit '28.

=== International ===
De Wolf made his debut for the Netherlands on 16 December 1987 in a 3–0 win in Greece during their Euro '88 qualifying campaign. After this substitute appearance though, he was not chosen again for over five years. He returned to contention under managerialship of Dick Advocaat and won five further caps during 1993–94.

He scored two international goals during a 6–0 thrashing of San Marino in March 1993 and was subsequently chosen for the squad for the 1994 World Cup, however he did not feature in any of the games. His final cap came on 13 October 1993 in a 2–0 win against England that effectively ended England's hopes of qualifying and Graham Taylor's reign as manager. Ironically, it would be Taylor who would next sign de Wolf in his club career (for Wolves).

=== Managerial ===
He retired from playing in 2000, and joined RKSV Halsteren as trainer. He has been manager of three different sides since – SVVSMC, Haaglandia and Türkiyemspor. He left the latter in February 2008. In February 2009, de Wolf became the manager of Voorschoten '97, a side in the Eerste Klasse B. For the 2009–10 season, he became manager of WKE, a Dutch hoofdklasse team. In March 2014, he was dismissed by Sliedrecht.

== Outside football ==
De Wolf is currently working as a TV presenter on Dutch regional channel RNN7, on a show entitled Living with John. He began his media career in 2004 on Correct Studio Sport, before presenting the programmes Cooking with John and Sleeping with John.

In 2006, he was one of the participants on the Dutch hit-show Dancing with the Stars. He also featured on the show Fighting with the Stars in 2007, where he fought – and lost to – Tschen La Ling, another former football player.

== Career statistics ==
=== International ===
Appearances and goals by national team and year
National team	Year	Apps	Goals
Netherlands	1987	1	0
Netherlands	1988	0	0
Netherlands	1989	0	0
Netherlands	1990	0	0
Netherlands	1991	0	0
Netherlands	1992	0	0
Netherlands	1993	3	2
Netherlands	1994	2	0
Total		6	2

Scores and results list the Netherlands' goal tally first, score column indicates score after each De Wolf goal.

List of international goals scored by John de Wolf
No.	Date	Venue	Opponent	Score	Result	Competition
1	24 March 1993	Stadion Galgenwaard, Utrecht, Netherlands	San Marino	3–0	6–0	1994 FIFA World Cup qualification
2	24 March 1993	Stadion Galgenwaard, Utrecht, Netherlands	San Marino	6–0	6–0	1994 FIFA World Cup qualification

== Honours ==
=== Player ===
Feyenoord

- Eredivisie: 1992–93
- KNVB Cup: 1990–91, 1991–92, 1993–94
- Dutch Supercup (in 1996 rebranded as Johan Cruyff Shield): 1991; runner-up 1992, 1993, 1994

=== Assistant manager ===
Feyenoord

- Eredivisie: 2022–23
- KNVB Cup: 2023–24
