= Ab van Oorschot =

Dutch footballer (born 1952)

Personal information
- Date of birth: 7 December 1952 (age 73)
- Position: Midfielder

Youth career
- VV Rijsoord?
- –1970: Feyenoord
- 1970–1971: FC Dordrecht

Senior career*
Years	Team	Apps	(Gls)
1970–1977	FC Dordrecht		
1977–1981	SC Telstar		
1981–1983	FC Dordrecht		
1983–1986	Fluks Dordrecht		

Managerial career
- 1986–1989: Ido's Football Club
- 1989–199?: VV Groote Lindt
- 199?: VV 's-Gravendeel
- 2009: Ido's Football Club (interim)
- * Club domestic league appearances and goals

Ab van Oorschot (7 December 1952) is a retired professional footballer for FC Dordrecht and SC Telstar. His position was midfielder. He also coached football and worked as a plumber.

== Playing career ==
After playing in a Feyenoord youth team, Van Oorschot played in the FC Dordrecht first squad from 1970 until 1977. On 5 December 1971, he scored the finishing touch in the 2–0 defeat of PEC Zwolle in the sixth round of the Eerste Divisie.

Van Oorschot played for SC Telstar from 1977 to 1981. At Telstar, he was the captain of the team. He returned to FC Dordrecht from 1981 to 1983, and continued his player career at Fluks Dordrecht until 1986.

== Managerial career ==
In 1986, Van Oorschot became head coach of IFC. In 1989, he changed to VV Groote Lindt. Later, he briefly coached VV 's-Gravendeel. In 2009, Van Oorschot, as caretaker manager, brought IFC through playoffs for the first time in its long history to the Eerste Klasse.
