= Robert Verbeek =

Dutch football manager (born 1961)

Personal information
- Date of birth: 26 July 1961 (age 65)
- Place of birth: Netherlands
- Position: Left-back

Senior career*
Years	Team	Apps	(Gls)
- Sparta Rotterdam

Managerial career
- 1996–2000: FC Dordrecht
- 2000: FC Türkiyemspor
- 2001: Al-Jazeera Club
- 2001: Al-Shabbab
- 2004–2005: FC Dordrecht
- 2005: Singapore U15/U16
- 2007: Omiya Ardija
- 2008–2010: Deltasport
- 2009–2010: Ido's Football Club
- 2011–2014: Morocco U17/U20
- 2015–2017: VOC Rotterdam
- 2017–2022: RV & AV Sparta
- 2019: Ido's Football Club
- 2023–: CION Vlaardingen
- * Club domestic league appearances and goals

Robert Verbeek (born 26 July 1961) is a Dutch football manager and former player who coaches RV & AV Sparta. Verbeek is the younger brother of former Oman manager Pim Verbeek. As a player, he featured for Sparta Rotterdam, where he retired at the age of 21.

== Coaching career ==
Verbeek played as a left-back for Sparta Rotterdam. Following his retirement he started his coaching career as a youth coach at Sparta Rotterdam and also worked for amateur teams NRC Ommoord (1985–1988), Neptunus and Unitas. In 1988, he was appointed by PSV Eindhoven, where he worked as a coach for a total period of eight years. In this period he assisted coaches like Guus Hiddink and Sir Bobby Robson. He worked with famous players like Romario and Ronaldo, who became famous after their spell with PSV. From 1996 to 2000 he started as a head coach and managed FC Dordrecht, but did not book any notable results and the team balanced in halfway positions in the Eerste Divisie.

In 2000, he coached Amsterdam based ambitious amateur side FC Türkiyemspor, but moved to the United Arab Emirates a year later to coach both Al-Jazeera Club and Al-Shabbab. On 1 January 2004, he returned to the Netherlands and started at FC Dordrecht for the second time, this time to replace Jos van Eck. In March 2005 he decided to leave the club due to disappointing results and to try his luck abroad. FC Dordrecht had already appointed Jurrie Koolhof as their new manager for the upcoming season. As a result, he was appointed by the Singaporean football association, where he coached the Singapore under 15 and under 16 squads. In 2007, he was in charge of J. League club Omiya Ardija.

== Managerial statistics ==
Team	From	To	Record				
Team	From	To	G	W	D	L	Win %
Omiya Ardija	2007	2007	18	3	7	8	16.67
Total			18	3	7	8	16.67
