= SV Deurne =

Dutch football club

- Full name: Sportvereniging Deurne
- Founded: 1 August 1942
- Ground: De Kranenmortel, Deurne
- Chairman: Kees Brood
- Manager: Klaas Wels
- League: Eerste Klasse Sunday D (2019–20)
- Website: http://www.svdeurne.nl/
Home colours

SV Deurne is a football club from Deurne, Netherlands. Deurne will be playing in the Sunday Hoofdklasse B (4th tier) in the 2013–14 season.

The club was founded in 1942, when D.O.S. and Deurania merged. Deurne became champions of the 2007–08 Sunday Hoofdklasse B. At that time, the Hoofdklasse was the highest tier of Dutch amateur football.

Deurne won the 2010 and 2013 KNVB District Cup in the Zuid 2 (South 2) District.
