= Kralingen =

Coordinates: 51°55′30″N 4°30′26″E

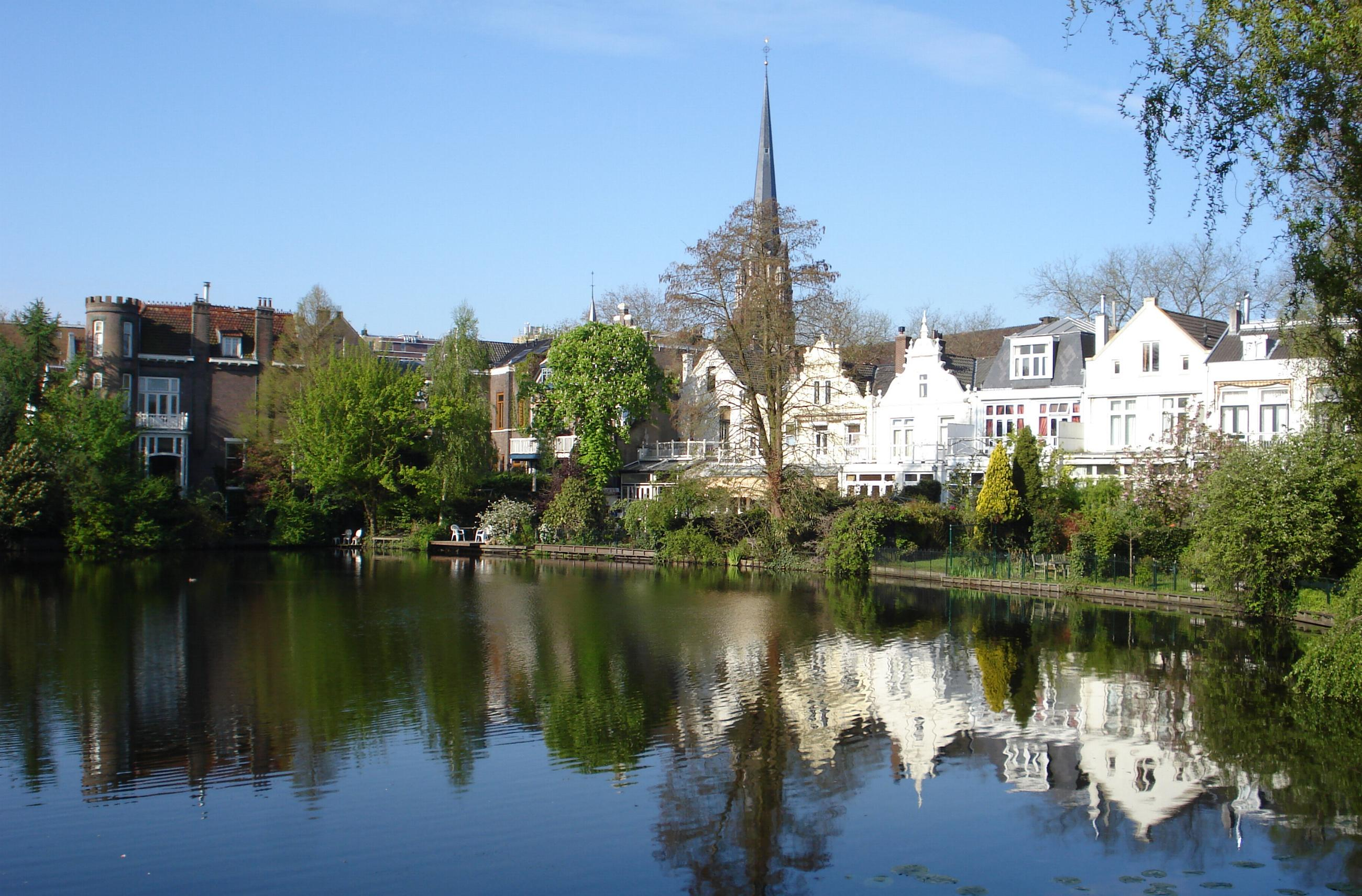

- Seal

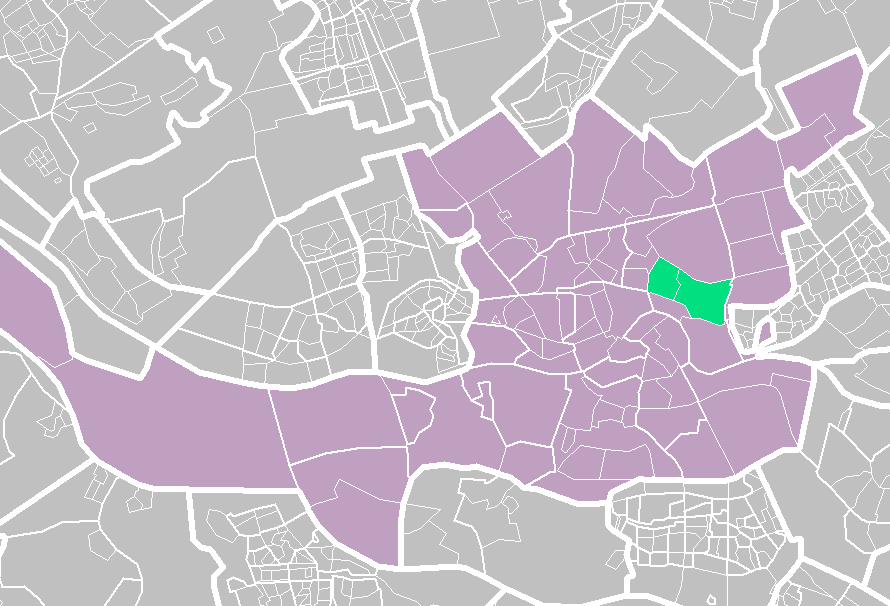
- Country: Netherlands
- Province: South Holland
- COROP: Rotterdam
- Borough: Kralingen-Crooswijk

Population
  - Total: 23,830
- Time zone: UTC+1 (CET)

Kralingen (Dutch pronunciation: [ˈkraːlɪŋə(n)]) is a former village in the Dutch province of South Holland, now a neighbourhood of Rotterdam. It is located about 3 kilometres east of the city centre, in the borough Kralingen-Crooswijk.

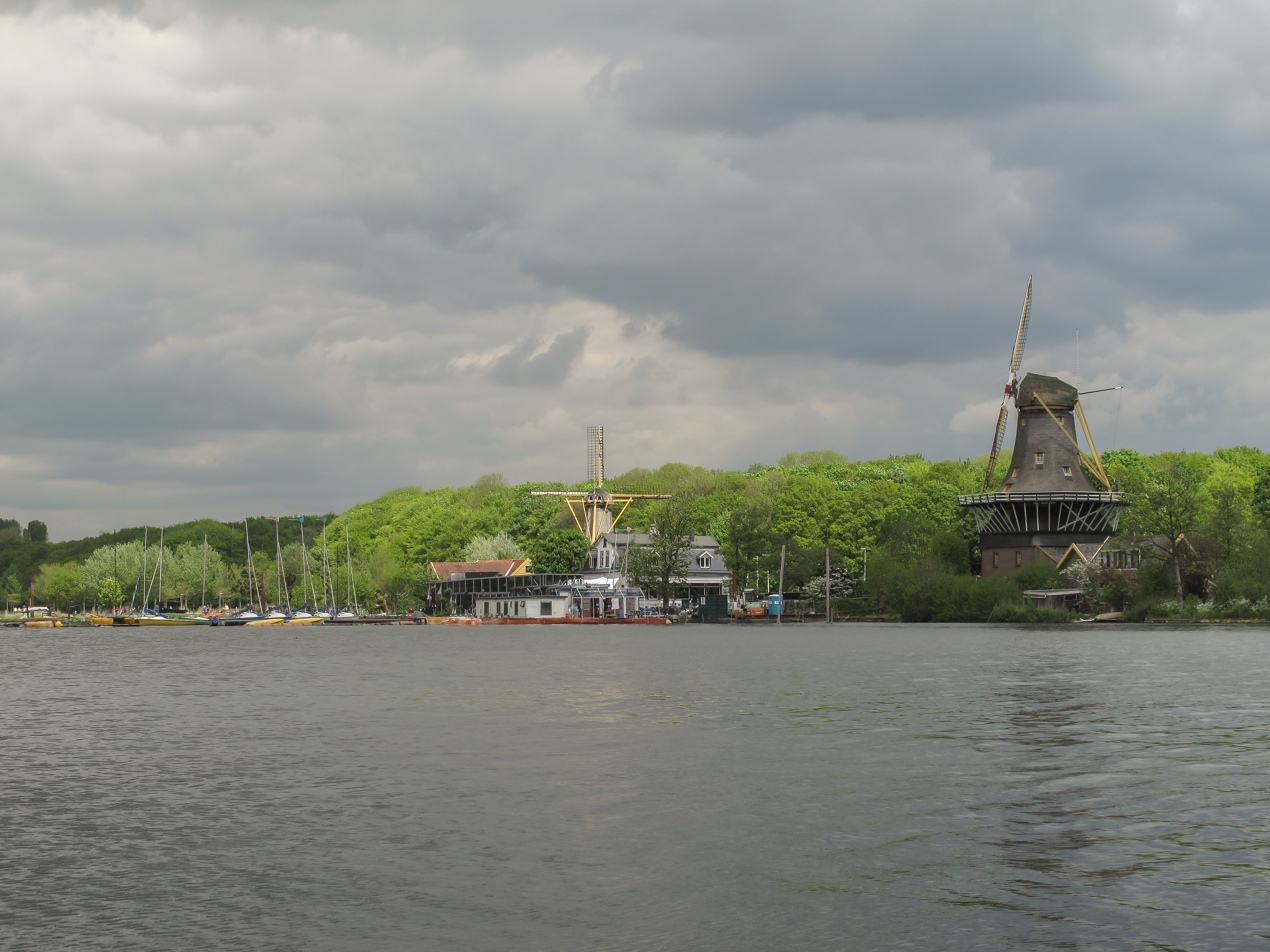
Two mills and the Kralingse Plas

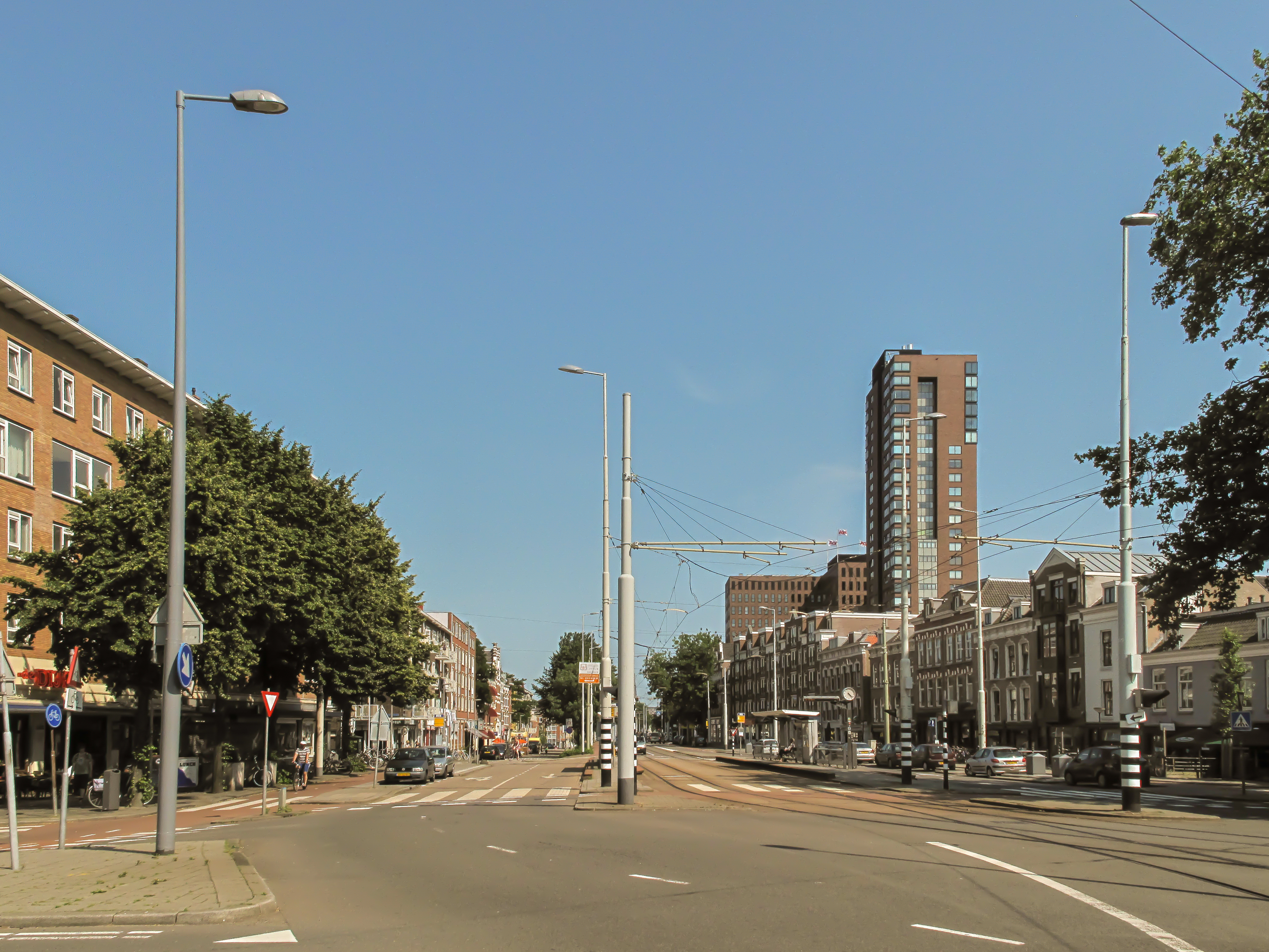
View to Oostzeedijk from Oostplein

Kralingen was a separate municipality until 1895, when it merged with Rotterdam. Previously, the high society of the growing city had their pleasure gardens and villas erected there in the 19th century, on the eastern outskirts of the village. The easternmost part of Kralingen, Woudestein, is where the main campus of Erasmus University Rotterdam and the Excelsior Rotterdam stadium are situated.

Kralingen is home to a Louis XIV-XV style mansion which is on the national monument register. It is also the location of Kralingse Plas, a large surface water used for recreation, and the Kralingse Bos, a forest of 2 square kilometres that welcomed 100,000 visitors for the Kralingen Music Festival in 1970 which was the "European answer to Woodstock", with 20 rock and pop groups performing, including Pink Floyd, Jefferson Airplane, The Byrds and Santana.

Footballer Robin van Persie was born and spent much of his youth in Kralingen.

When Rotterdam was bombed on 14 May 1940, a large area in the western part of Kralingen went up in flames with it.
