= RKSV Leonidas =

Former association football club in Rotterdam, Netherlands

- Full name: Rooms-Katholieke Sport Vereniging Leonidas
- Founded: 1909; 116 years ago
- Dissolved: 2021; 4 years ago
- Ground: Leonidas, Rotterdam
- Capacity: 1,000
- League: Hoofdklasse Sunday B
- 2020–21: Hoofdklasse Sunday B, 16th of 16 (withdrew)
Home colours

RKSV Leonidas was a football club from Rotterdam, Netherlands.

== History ==
The club won the 2012 KNVB Amateur Cup. In 1999, Leonidas won the KNVB District Cup in the (now defunct) West IV District.

In August 2020, reports surfaced indicating the potential dissolution of the club, based on recommendations from board members Geert Hof and Bart Kreft, citing years of financial and organisational challenges. The club faced difficulties in mobilising volunteers, experienced a decline in financial resources, and accrued a debt of €100,000. Discussions were held with SVV from Schiedam regarding a possible merger, which was ultimately rejected during a General Assembly of the Schiedam-based club. Consequently, a reboot was initiated, with several teams lower ranked teams of the Saturday department. Subsequently, in April 2021, the youth department separated and rebranded as FC Banlieue.
