= Ido's Football Club =

Dutch football club

IFC
- Ido's Football Club
- Founded: 20 October 1927
- Ground: Sportpark Schildman, Hendrik-Ido-Ambacht
- League: Tweede Klasse
colours

Ido's Football Club, usually known as IFC, is a Dutch association football club from Hendrik-Ido-Ambacht. Its grounds are at Sportpark Schildman.

== History ==
=== First years ===
Ido's Football Club was established on 20 October 1927, 2 years before its Saturday football rival ASWH, and initially played football only on Sundays. The establishment was a merger of the street soccer clubs HIVV, OVV and SDW. Its members were for the most part left-oriented blue collar workers. IFC's first ground was Den Dommes in Oostendam, later covered by a bridge and road over the Noord River.

=== 2010s ===
Since 2014 and occasionally before IFC also has a team for Saturday soccer. In 2016–2017 this team plays in the Derde Klasse of district South-I. IFC further features women teams, youth teams, and senior teams. It engaged in women soccer already in the 1970s.

IFC's prime squad are male Sunday "amateurs" playing in the season 2016–2017 in Hoofdklasse B. Coach was Jack van den Berg, who was behind the promotion of the first squads of IFC and neighboring ASWH in the same season.

In the 2017–2018 season, the first squads of Sunday and Saturday football are coached by Virgil Breetveld, who arrived in Ambacht after training SteDoCo. Breetveld got sacked in March 2018. Gerard van der Mei replaced him as head coach of the Saturday football team, Robert Verbeek replaced him as head coach of the Sunday football team.

In 2019, the first male squad only just survived the relegation playoff from the Hoofdklasse. The first women squad won a section championship and promoted from the Derde Klasse to the Tweede Klasse. In the summer of 2019, Jack van Berg is back as coach of IFC.

=== 2020s ===
In 2021, IFC dropped its Sunday first squad that played in the Hoofdklasse. The contract of coach Jack van den Berg was ended after IFC could no longer afford him. Some other Sunday squads continued. The Saturday first squad, now the main first squad, won a Vierde Klasse section championship in 2022 and promoted to the Derde Klasse. In 2023 it promoted to the Tweede Klasse and in 2025 to the Eerste Klasse.

== Head coach ==
=== Saturday squad ===
- Arjan Zoeteman (2014–15)
- Frank Zwakhals (2015–17)
- Virgil Breetveld (2017–19)
- Gerard van der Mei (interim, 2019)
- Winston Faerber (2019–20)
- Hans Harmans (2020–21)
- Ron Timmers (2022–2025)
- Michael Nijssen (2025–)

=== Sunday squad ===
- Ger Bruys (198?–1984)
- Ab van Oorschot (1986–1989)
- Ron Tempelaar (2007–2009)
- Ab van Oorschot (interim, 2009)
- Robert Verbeek (2009–2010)
- Jasper de Muijnck (2010–11)
- Jack van den Berg (2013–16)
- Virgil Breetveld (2017–19)
- Robert Verbeek (interim, 2019)
- Jack van den Berg (2019–21, last)
