= 2021–22 Eerste Klasse =

Eerste Klasse
- Season: 2021–22

2021–22 Eerste Klasse was an Eerste Klasse season. The teams were near-identical to the 2019–20 Eerste Klasse season, after the COVID-19 pandemic in the Netherlands caused the KNVB to decide that there would be no relegation and promotion following the previous season.

At the end of the season, section champions were promoted and relegated as usual with one exception. Sunday section F champion VV Hoogezand chose to move to Saturday football and did not promote. The runner-up in the section, VV VKW, was promoted instead.

In order to complete a regular season, makeup games were played in 2022, after many games were canceled in 2021.

== Section champions ==
=== Saturday ===
- A: WV-HEDW
- B: VV Kloetinge
- C: SV Huizen
- D: CSV Apeldoorn
- E: Olde Veste

=== Sunday ===
- A: SV Kampong
- B: Unitas '30
- C: HVCH
- D: SV Venray
- E: Rohda Raalte
- F: VV Hoogezand (moved to the new Saturday F, VV VKW promoted instead)
