= FC Türkiyemspor =

Türkiyemspor
- Full name: FC Türkiyemspor
- Founded: 1987
- Dissolved: 2009
- Ground: Sportpark Spieringhorn, Amsterdam
- 2008–09: Hoofdklasse; Sunday A, resigned
Home colours	Away colours

FC Türkiyemspor was a Dutch football club based in Amsterdam which was active from 1987 to 2009 when the club went bankrupt. The club quickly rose through the ranks of amateur football, winning four promotions between 1996 and 2002. Türkiyemspor won the Hoofdklasse title in its maiden season in 2002–03 and successfully defended the championship the year after. In 2004–05, Türkiyemspor were runners-up, only to regain the title the following season.

Change came when entrepreneur and chairman Nedim Imaç was assassinated on 17 February 2007. A week after his death, newspaper De Telegraaf reported that Imaç had been involved in heroin trade. Imaç was the club's biggest sponsor and his death led to financial troubles. Bills were unpaid and the club was on the verge of collapse. An attempt to make a new start appeared successful, but in February 2009, Türkiyemspor went bankrupt and was dissolved.

== Former managers ==
- (Netherlands) Robert Verbeek
- (Netherlands) John de Wolf

== See also ==
- Turks in the Netherlands
- Croydon Athletic, another club that was dissolved due to similar issues.
