= VV DUNO =

Dutch football club

Voetbalvereniging Door Uithouding Naar Overwinning, known as VV DUNO for short, is an association football club in Doorwerth, Netherlands. It plays at Sportpark De Waayenberg.

== History ==
VV Duno was founded on 19 August 1948. From 1974 until 2013 its first squad was usually a Vierde Klasse team. It played five of these seasons in the Derde Klasse, but there were also two years that it was absent from the KNVB leagues.

=== 2010s: Fast ascend ===
In 2012–13 the club's fast ascend started. That year it won the section of the Vierde Klasse, promoting it to the Derde Klasse. At the end of the next season (2014) it promoted to the Tweede Klasse, after winning another section championship. Two years later (2016) Duno promoted to the Eerste Klasse, again as champions of its previous league.

The first male squad promoted in 2018 to the Saturday Hoofdklasse, again by winning the championship. In 2019 it won the KNVB District Cup East. As Duno enters its second season in the Hoofdklasse, coach Jan Oosterhuis was replaced by Roy de Haan.
