= TOGR =

- Full name: Tot Ons Genoegen Rotterdam
- Founded: 1929; 97 years ago
- Dissolved: 2013; 13 years ago
- Ground: Charloisse Lagedijk; Rotterdam, Netherlands
- Chairman: Ad van der Poort
- Manager: Rene Blauwkamp
- League: Hoofdklasse
Home colours	Away colours

Tot Ons Genoegen Rotterdam, known as TOGR was a Dutch football club founded in 1929, based in Rotterdam. It was dissolved on 11 June 2013. It competed 6 season the Hoofdklasse.
