= 2014–15 Helmond Sport season =

Helmond Sport
2014–15 season
- Chairman: Philippe van Esch
- Manager: Jan van Dijk
- Stadium: GS Staalwerken Stadion
- Eerste Divisie: 17th
- KNVB Cup: 2nd round
- Top goalscorer: League: Stanley Elbers (13 goals); All: Stanley Elbers (13 goals)
- Highest home attendance: 3,412 (against SC Telstar in 13rd week)
- Lowest home attendance: 917 (against Jong FC Twente in 30th week)
- Average home league attendance: 2,114
- Biggest win: 5-2 (against SC Telstar(h)), 3-0 (against RKC Waalwijk(h) and VVV-Venlo(h)) in Eerste Divisie
- Biggest defeat: 7-0 (against Roda JC Kerkrade in Eerste Divisie
- All statistics correct as of 25 September 2024.

The 2014–15 season was Helmond Sport's 48th season in existence and 45th (31st consecutive) in the Eerste Divisie. Helmond Sport finished Eerste Divisie as 17th.

The club competed also in the KNVB Cup. Helmond Sport lost 4–3 against MVV Maastricht after extra time in the 2nd round of KNVB Cup and they were eliminated from the cup.

Stanley Elbers was the top scorer of the club in this season with 13 goals in Eerste Divisie.

Wouter van der Steen was the most appeared player in the season with 36 appearances, all in the Eerste Divisie.

== Players ==
=== First-team squad ===
As of 28 September 2024

Note: Flags indicate national team as defined under FIFA eligibility rules; some limited exceptions apply. Players may hold more than one non-FIFA nationality.

No.	Pos.	Nation	Player
1	GK	NED	Wouter van der Steen
2	DF	USA	Charles Kazlauskas
3	DF	NED	Ferry de Regt
4	DF	NED	Jeffrey van Nuland
5	MF	CUW	Gillian Justiana
6	MF	NED	Kevin Visser
6	MF	NED	Kevin Gomez-Nieto
7	MF	NED	Juanito Sequeira
7	MF	NED	Mounir El Allouchi
8	MF	BEL	Daniel Guijo-Velasco
9	FW	NED	Jack Tuijp
10	FW	BEL	Oumar Diouck
11	FW	NED	Stanley Elbers

No.	Pos.	Nation	Player
12	FW	NED	Marc Koot
14	MF	NED	Roel van de Sande
17	MF	NED	Arne van Geffen
18	DF	BEL	Koen Weuts
19	FW	CUW	Maiky Fecunda
20	DF	NED	Sven van de Kerkhof
23	FW	NED	Marciano Duda
23	FW	NED	Lars Hutten
26	DF	NED	Dave Nieskens
28	MF	NED	Sam Strijbosch
29	MF	NED	Colin van Gool
30	GK	SCO	Jamie Watt

== Transfers ==
=== In ===
Pos.	Player	Transferred from	Fee	Date
MF	(Netherlands) Colin van Gool	(Netherlands) Young VVV-Venlo		1 Jul 2014
DF	(Netherlands) Kevin Gomez-Nieto	(England) Stoke City F.C. (U21)	Free	1 Jul 2014
FW	(Netherlands) Marciano Duda	(Netherlands) Young VVV-Venlo	Undisclosed	1 Jul 2014
DF	(Netherlands) Martijn Henst	(Netherlands) VVV-Venlo (U19)	Undisclosed	1 Jul 2014
MF	(Netherlands) Roel van de Sande	(Netherlands) TOP Oss	Free	1 Jul 2014
MF	(Netherlands) Sam Strijbosch	(Netherlands) VVV-Venlo (U19)	Undisclosed	1 Jul 2014
GK	(Netherlands) Stijn van Gassel	(Netherlands) VVV-Venlo (U19)	Undisclosed	1 Jul 2014
MF	(Belgium) Oumar Diouck	(Belgium) K. Standaard Wetteren	Free	28 Jul 2014
FW	(Netherlands) Jack Tuyp	(Hungary) Ferencvárosi TC	On loan	14 Aug 2014
FW	(Netherlands) Lars Hutten	(Netherlands) Excelsior Rotterdam	On loan	1 Sep 2014
DF	(Netherlands) Dave Jannenga	(Belgium) C.S. Visé	End of loan	1 Jan 2015
MF	(Netherlands) Mounir El Allouchi	(Netherlands) Young NAC Breda	On loan	30 Jan 2015

=== Out ===
Pos.	Player	Transferred to	Fee	Date
MF	(Belgium) Andreas Luckermans	(Belgium) Anderlecht U21	End of loan	30 Jun 2014
MF	(Netherlands) Kenny Teijsse	(Netherlands) FC Utrecht	End of loan	30 Jun 2014
DF	(Netherlands) Aart Verberne	No club		1 Jul 2014
MF	(Netherlands) Gregory Lammers	(Netherlands) SC Helmondia	Free	1 Jul 2014
DF	(Netherlands) Joey Brock	(Netherlands) AFC Arnhem	Free	1 Jul 2014
MF	(Algeria) Karim Bridji	(Netherlands) AFC Ajax amateurs	Free	1 Jul 2014
FW	(Netherlands) Jeremias Carlos David	No club		1 Jul 2014
DF	(Netherlands) Mark Luijpers	(Netherlands) JVC Cuijk	Free	1 Jul 2014
FW	(Netherlands) Serhat Koç	(Turkey) Şanlıurfaspor	€40,000	1 Jul 2014
DF	(Netherlands) Dave Jannenga	(Belgium) C.S. Visé	On loan	20 Jul 2014
FW	(Belgium) Davy Brouwers	(Netherlands) MVV Maastricht	Free	6 Aug 2014
FW	(Netherlands) Mark Janssen	(Netherlands) JVC Cuijk	Free	24 Aug 2014
DF	(Netherlands) Mees Siers	(Denmark) Sønderjyske Fodbold	Free	1 Sep 2014
MF	(Netherlands) Juanito Sequeira	No club		19 Jan 2015

== Competitions ==
=== Overall record ===
Competition	First match	Last match	Starting round	Final position	Record							
Competition	First match	Last match	Starting round	Final position	Pld	W	D	L	GF	GA	GD	Win %
Eerste Divisie	8 August 2014	8 May 2015	Week 1	17th	38	10	8	20	52	85	−33	26.32
KNVB Cup	24 September 2014		2nd round	2nd round	1	0	0	1	3	4	−1	0.00
Total					39	10	8	21	55	89	−34	25.64

Source: ESPN

=== Eerste Divisie ===
==== Results summary ====
Overall								Home						Away					
Pld	W	D	L	GF	GA	GD	Pts	W	D	L	GF	GA	GD	W	D	L	GF	GA	GD
38	10	8	20	52	85	−33	38	9	2	8	37	39	−2	1	6	12	15	46	−31

Source: ESPN

==== Results by round ====
Round	1	2	3	4	5	6	7	8	9	10	11	12	13	14	15	16	17	18	19	20	21	22	23	24	25	26	27	28	29	30	31	32	33	34	35	36	37	38
Ground	H	A	H	A	H	A	A	H	A	H	A	A	H	A	H	A	H	A	H	A	H	A	A	H	H	A	H	A	H	H	A	H	H	A	H	A	H	A
Result	L	D	W	D	L	D	L	L	L	D	L	L	W	L	W	L	W	D	L	L	D	L	L	L	L	D	W	D	L	L	L	W	W	L	W	W	W	L
Position																																						17

Source: ESPN
A = Away; H = Home; W = Win; D = Draw; L = Loss

=== Matches ===
==== 1st half ====
8 August 2014 Week 1	Helmond Sport	0-1	Fortuna Sittard	Helmond
20:00		Report	Jesper Waalkens 80'	Stadium: GS Staalwerken Stadion; Attendance: 2,114

18 August 2014 Week 2	Jong FC Twente	2-2	Helmond Sport	Enschede
20:00	Jesús Corona 4' 8'	Report	Oumar Diouck 17'; Stanley Elbers 75'	Stadium: De Grolsch Veste; Attendance: 150

22 August 2014 Week 3	Helmond Sport	2-1	Top Oss	Helmond
20:00	Rick Stuy van den Herik 17' (o.g.); Oumar Diouck 35'	Report	Dennis Janssen 72'	Stadium: GS Staalwerken Stadion; Attendance: 2,011

25 August 2014 Week 4	Sparta Rotterdam	0-0	Helmond Sport	Rotterdam
20:00		Report		Stadium: Het Kasteel; Attendance: 5,357

29 August 2014 Week 5	Helmond Sport	1-4	NEC Nijmegen	Helmond
20:00	Stanley Elbers 3' (pen.)	Report	Alireza Jahanbakhsh 15' 22'; Sjoerd Ars 51' 54'	Stadium: GS Staalwerken Stadion; Attendance: 2,736

12 September 2014 Week 6	FC Emmen	2-2	Helmond Sport	Emmen
20:00	Roland Bergkamp 34'; Leandro Resida 63'	Report	Stanley Elbers 31'; Oumar Diouck 50'	Stadium: De Oude Meerdijk; Attendance: 3,875

19 September 2014 Week 7	FC Den Bosch	3-0	Helmond Sport	Den Bosch
20:00	Erik Quekel 17'; Jordy Thomassen 41'; Edoardo Ceria 87'	Report		Stadium: Stadion De Vliert; Attendance: 3,286

27 September 2014 Week 8	Helmond Sport	1-2	Roda JC Kerkrade	Helmond
16:30	Stanley Elbers 44' (pen.)	Report	Wiljan Pluim 53'; Rigino Cicilia 80'	Stadium: GS Staalwerken Stadion; Attendance: 2,864

3 October 2014 Week 9	VVV-Venlo	2-1	Helmond Sport	Venlo
20:00	Melvin Platje 22'; Jeffrey Altheer 38'	Report	Jack Tuyp 67'	Stadium: Covebo Stadion - De Koel; Attendance: 4,100

17 October 2014 Week 10	Helmond Sport	2-2	Jong Ajax	Helmond
20:00	Stanley Elbers 59'; PenOumar Diouck 83'	Report	Sheraldo Becker 24'; Richairo Zivkovic 66'	Stadium: GS Staalwerken Stadion; Attendance: 2,800

24 October 2014 Week 11	Almere City FC	3-2	Helmond Sport	Almere
20:00	Vincent Janssen 15' 7'; Leon de Kogel 79'	Report	Stanley Elbers 37'; PenJack Tuyp 49'	Stadium: Yanmar Stadion; Attendance: 817

1 November 2014 Week 12	De Graafschap	5-0	Helmond Sport	Doetinchem
19:45	Jerry van Ewijk 7' 59' 77'; Vincent Vermeij 18'; Caner Cavlan 20'	Report		Stadium: De Vijverberg; Attendance: 4,930

7 November 2014 Week 13	Helmond Sport	5-2	SC Telstar	Helmond
20:00	Kevin Visser 18' 34' 51'; Jack Tuyp 24'; Toine van Huizen 67' (o.g.)	Report	Jonathan Kindermans 7'; Ralf Seuntjens 42'	Stadium: GS Staalwerken Stadion; Attendance: 3,412

22 November 2014 Week 14	Achilles '29	3-2	Helmond Sport	Groesbeek
16:30	Thijs Hendriks 16' 68'; Steven Edwards 45+1'	Report	Koen Weuts 28'; Jack Tuyp 86'	Stadium: Sportpark de Heikant; Attendance: 1,600

28 November 2014 Week 15	Helmond Sport	2-1	Jong PSV	Helmond
20:00	Jack Tuyp 29'; Oumar Diouck 85'	Report	Menno Koch 3'	Stadium: GS Staalwerken Stadion; Attendance: 2,825

1 December 2014 Week 16	FC Eindhoven	3-0	Helmond Sport	Eindhoven
20:00	Tom Boere 12'; Fries Deschilder 75'; Jason Bourdouxhe 78'	Report		Stadium: Jan Louwers Stadion; Attendance: 3,653

6 December 2014 Week 17	Helmond Sport	3-2	MVV Maastricht	Helmond
19:45	Stanley Elbers 43' (pen.) 44'; Marc Koot 85'	Report	Sven Braken 12'; Davy Brouwers 66'	Stadium: GS Staalwerken Stadion; Attendance: 2,200

12 December 2014 Week 18	RKC Waalwijk	0-0	Helmond Sport	Waalwijk
20:00		Report		Stadium: Mandemakers Stadion; Attendance: 2,412

20 December 2014 Week 19	Helmond Sport	3-4	FC Volendam	Helmond
19:45	Oumar Diouck 11'; Charles Kazlauskas 45'; Kevin Gomez 90+3'	Report	Henk Veerman 15'; Kevin Gomez 20' (o.g.); Ludcinio Marengo 49'; Kevin van Kippersluis 81'	Stadium: GS Staalwerken Stadion; Attendance: 2,400

==== 2nd half ====
16 January 2015 Week 20	Fortuna Sittard	1-0	Helmond Sport	Sittard
20:00	Roel Janssen 64' (pen.)	Report		Stadium: Fortuna Sittard Stadion; Attendance: 1,428

23 January 2015 Week 21	Helmond Sport	2-2	FC Emmen	Helmond
20:00	Kevin Visser 64'; Oumar Diouck 68'	Report	Leandro Resida 29'; Cas Peters 60'	Stadium: GS Staalwerken Stadion; Attendance: 1,617

1 February 2015 Week 22	NEC Nijmegen	3-1	Helmond Sport	Nijmegen
14:30	Christian Santos 24'; Alireza Jahanbakhsh 52'; Anthony Limbombe 90'	Report	Lars Hutten 49' (pen.)	Stadium: Goffertstadion; Attendance: 9,800

6 February 2015 Week 23	TOP Oss	3-1	Helmond Sport	Oss
20:00	Fatih Kamaci 1'; Justin Mathieu 17'; Johnatan Opoku 35'	Report	Lars Hutten 56'	Stadium: Frans Heesen Stadion; Attendance: 1,073

9 February 2015 Week 24	Helmond Sport	0-5	Sparta Rotterdam	Helmond
20:00		Report	Wouter van der Steen 6' (o.g.); Denis Mahmudov 50' 85' (pen.); PenRobert Van boxel 52'; Paul Gladon 74'	Stadium: GS Staalwerken Stadion; Attendance: 1,459

13 February 2015 Week 25	Helmond Sport	1-5	FC Den Bosch	Helmond
20:00	Gillian Justiana 3'	Report	Alexander Mols 12' 38' 59'; Anthony Lurling 32'; Darren Maatsen 90'	Stadium: GS Staalwerken Stadion; Attendance: 1,100

21 February 2015 Week 26	MVV Maastricht	1-1	Helmond Sport	Maastricht
16:30	Wimilio Vink 90+2'	Report	Jack Tuyp 5'	Stadium: De Geusselt; Attendance: 3,264

27 February 2015 Week 27	Helmond Sport	3-0	RKC Waalwijk	Helmond
20:00	Stanley Elbers 11' 38'; PenMounir El Allouchi 62'	Report		Stadium: GS Staalwerken Stadion; Attendance: 2,112

9 March 2015 Week 28	Jong PSV	0-0	Helmond Sport	Eindhoven
20:00		Report		Stadium: Jan Louwers Stadion; Attendance: 400

13 March 2015 Week 29	Helmond Sport	2-3	FC Eindhoven	Helmond
20:00	Koen Weuts 71'; Dave Nieskens 87'	Report	Jason Bourdouxhe 15'; Maxime Gunst 59' (pen.); Branco van den Boomen 81'	Stadium: GS Staalwerken Stadion; Attendance: 3,012

16 March 2015 Week 30	Helmond Sport	1-2	Jong FC Twente	Helmond
20:00	Gillian Justiana 42'	Report	Kasper Kusk 38'; Shadrach Eghan 71'	Stadium: GS Staalwerken Stadion; Attendance: 917

20 March 2015 Week 31	FC Volendam	4-1	Helmond Sport	Volendam
20:00	Raymond Fafiani 17'; Gijs Luirink 19'; Guyon Philips 50'; Kevin Brands 87'	Report	Roel van de Sande 83'	Stadium: Kras Stadion; Attendance: 3,644

3 April 2015 Week 32	Helmond Sport	2-1	De Graafschap	Helmond
20:00	Marc Koot 2'; Mounir El Allouchi 26'	Report	Vlatko Lazic 28'	Stadium: GS Staalwerken Stadion; Attendance: 1,841

6 April 2015 Week 33	Helmond Sport	1-0	Almere City FC	Helmond
14:30	Mounir El Allouchi 73'	Report		Stadium: GS Staalwerken Stadion; Attendance: 1,278

12 April 2015 Week 34	Roda JC Kerkrade	7-0	Helmond Sport	Kerkrade
14:30	Mitchell Paulissen 6' 42' 57'; Bart Biemans 21'; Tom van Hyfte 25'; Danny Schreurs 49' (pen.); Frank Demouge 50'	Report		Stadium: Parkstad Limburg Stadion; Attendance: 9,782

17 April 2015 Week 35	Helmond Sport	3-1	VVV-Venlo	Helmond
20:00	Gianluca Nijholt 40' (o.g.); Stanley Elbers 50'; Mounir El Allouchi 52'	Report	Guus Joppen 7'	Stadium: GS Staalwerken Stadion; Attendance: 1,890

24 April 2015 Week 36	Jong Ajax	0-2	Helmond Sport	Duivendrecht
20:00		Report	Stanley Elbers 16'; Oumar Diouck 29'	Stadium: Sportpark De Toekomst; Attendance: 255

1 May 2015 Week 37	Helmond Sport	3-1	Achilles '29	Helmond
20:00	Stanley Elbers 73'; Oumar Diouck 84'; Kevin Visser 86'	Report	Steven Edwards 90+1'	Stadium: GS Staalwerken Stadion; Attendance: 1,581

8 May 2015 Week 38	SC Telstar	4-0	Helmond Sport	Velsen-Zuid
20:00	Kevin van Essen 5'; Tarik Tissoudali 47'; Jonathan Kindermans 84'; Tim Keurntjes 89' (pen.)	Report		Stadium: 711 Stadion; Attendance: 2,218

=== KNVB Cup ===
21 February 2015 First round	MVV Maastricht	4-3 (a.e.t.)	Helmond Sport	Maastricht
17:45	Nick Kuipers 29'; Jordy Croux 30'; Ronald Hikspoors 103'; Niels Vorthoren 111'	Report	Juanito Sequeira 88' 109'; Oumar Diouck 90'	Stadium: De Geusselt; Attendance: 1,745; Referee: Reinold Wiedemeijer

== Statistics ==
=== Scorers ===
#	Player	Eerste Divisie	KNVB	Total
1	(Netherlands) Stanley Elbers	13	0	13
2	(Belgium) Oumar Diouck	9	1	10
3	(Netherlands) Jack Tuijp	6	0	6
4	(Netherlands) Kevin Visser	5	0	5
5	(Netherlands) Mounir El Allouchi	4	0	4
6	(Curaçao) Gillian Justiana	2	0	2
6	(Netherlands) Juanito Sequeira	0	2	2
6	(Netherlands) Lars Hutten	2	0	2
6	(Netherlands) Marc Koot	2	0	2
10	(United States) Charles Kazlauskas	1	0	1
10	(Netherlands) Dave Nieskens	1	0	1
10	(Netherlands) Kevin Gomez-Nieto	1	0	1
10	(Belgium) Koen Weuts	1	0	1
10	(Netherlands) Roel van de Sande	1	0	1

=== Appearances ===
#	Player	Eerste Divisie	KNVB	Total
1	(Netherlands) Wouter van der Steen	36	0	36
2	(Netherlands) Charles Kazlauskas	34	1	35
2	(Netherlands) Jeffrey van Nuland	34	1	35
2	(Netherlands) Roel van de Sande	34	1	35
5	(Netherlands) Stanley Elbers	33	0	33
6	(Netherlands) Kevin Visser	31	1	32
7	(Belgium) Oumar Diouck	30	1	31
8	(Belgium) Koen Weuts	28	1	29
9	(Netherlands) Jack Tuijp	25	1	26
10	(Netherlands) Marc Koot	23	0	23
11	(Netherlands) Lars Hutten	21	1	22
11	(Netherlands) Sven van de Kerkhof	22	0	22
13	(Curaçao) Gillian Justiana	21	0	21
13	(Netherlands) Kevin Gomez-Nieto	20	1	21
15	(Curaçao) Maiky Fecunda	17	0	17
16	(Netherlands) Juanito Sequeira	14	1	15
16	(Netherlands) Mounir El Allouchi	15	0	15
16	(Netherlands) Sam Strijbosch	15	0	15
19	(Netherlands) Dave Nieskens	12	0	12
19	(Netherlands) Ferry de Regt	11	1	12
21	(Netherlands) Arne van Geffen	10	1	11
22	(Belgium) Daniel Guijo-Velasco	6	1	7
23	(Netherlands) Marciano Duda	6	0	6
24	(Scotland) Jamie Watt	3	1	4
25	(Netherlands) Colin van Gool	1	0	1

=== Clean sheets ===
#	Player	Eerste Divisie
1	(Netherlands) Wouter van der Steen	6

=== Disciplinary record ===
#	Player	Eerste Divisie		KNVB		Total	
#	Player	Booked	Sent off (straight red)	Booked	Sent off (straight red)	Booked	Sent off (straight red)
1	(Netherlands) Jeffrey van Nuland	4	1	0	0	4	1
1	(Netherlands) Stanley Elbers	4	1	0	0	4	1
3	(Netherlands) Juanito Sequeira	3	1	0	0	3	1
3	(Netherlands) Roel van de Sande	3	1	0	0	3	1
5	(Belgium) Koen Weuts	2	1	0	0	2	1
6	(Netherlands) Kevin Gomez-Nieto	1	1	0	0	1	1
7	(Netherlands) Wouter van der Steen	0	1	0	0	0	1
8	(Curaçao) Gillian Justiana	6	0	0	0	6	0
9	(Netherlands) Charles Kazlauskas	5	0	0	0	5	0
9	(Belgium) Oumar Diouck	5	0	0	0	5	0
11	(Netherlands) Lars Hutten	4	0	0	0	4	0
12	(Netherlands) Kevin Visser	3	0	0	0	3	0
12	(Netherlands) Mounir El Allouchi	3	0	0	0	3	0
12	(Netherlands) Sven van de Kerkhof	3	0	0	0	3	0
15	(Curaçao) Maiky Fecunda	2	0	0	0	2	0
15	(Netherlands) Marc Koot	2	0	0	0	2	0
17	(Netherlands) Dave Nieskens	1	0	0	0	1	0
17	(Netherlands) Jack Tuijp	1	0	0	0	1	0
17	(Netherlands) Sam Strijbosch	1	0	0	0	1	0
