= 2024–25 Helmond Sport season =

Helmond Sport
2024–25 season
- Chairman: Philippe van Esch
- Manager: Kevin Hofland (until 3 Feb 2025); Robert Maaskant (from 11 Feb 2025)
- Stadium: GS Staalwerken Stadion
- Eerste Divisie: 13th
- KNVB Cup: 1st round
- Top goalscorer: League: Anthony van den Hurk (15 goals); All: Anthony van den Hurk (15 goals)
- Highest home attendance: 4,200 (FC Eindhoven 15th week & SBV Vitesse 26th week)
- Lowest home attendance: 1,652 (Jong AZ 22nd week)
- Average home league attendance: 2,858
- Biggest win: 4-0 (MVV Maastricht (h) 29th week)
- Biggest defeat: 4-0 (FC Dordrecht (a) 14th week)
- All statistics correct as of 10 May 2025.

The 2024–25 season is Helmond Sport's 58th season in existence and 41st consecutive in the Eerste Divisie. Helmond Sport finished 2024–25 Eerste Divisie as 13th.

The club competed also in the KNVB Cup. Helmond Sport lost 3-0 against SC Telstar in the 1st round of KNVB Cup and eliminated from the cup.

Anthony van den Hurk was the top scorer of the club in this season with 15 goals in Eerste Divisie.

Lennerd Daneels was the most appeared player in the season with 38 appearances; 37 appearances in the Eerste Divisie and 1 appearance in the KNVB Cup.

== Players ==
=== First-team squad ===
As of 4 February 2025

Note: Flags indicate national team as defined under FIFA eligibility rules; some limited exceptions apply. Players may hold more than one non-FIFA nationality.

No.	Pos.	Nation	Player
1	GK	NED	Wouter van der Steen
2	DF	GER	Tobias Pachonik
3	DF	BEL	Flor Van den Eynden
4	DF	MAR	Redouane Halhal
5	DF	GER	Jonas Scholz
6	MF	GER	Michel Ludwig
7	FW	NED	Sam Bisselink
8	MF	SVN	Enrik Ostrc
9	FW	LVA	Dario Šits
10	MF	SUI	Théo Golliard
11	FW	BEL	Lennerd Daneels
12	MF	CUW	Justin Ogenia
14	FW	NED	Mohamed Mallahi
17	FW	NED	Bryan van Hove
19	MF	ISL	Helgi Ingason

No.	Pos.	Nation	Player
21	GK	NED	Tom Hendriks
22	MF	CRO	Alen Dizdarevic
23	GK	NED	Kevin Aben
27	DF	NED	Amir Absalem
29	FW	NED	Onesime Zimuangana
32	FW	NED	Tarik Essakkati
33	DF	NED	Lars Zonneveld
37	DF	GER	Jonas Scholz
39	FW	CUW	Anthony van den Hurk
40	DF	NED	Aassim Farah
41	DF	NED	Sem Dekkers
42	MF	NED	Khalid El Arnouki
47	MF	BEL	Amin Doudah
52	MF	BEL	Axl Van Himbeeck
—	DF	NED	Jayden Davelaar

== Transfers ==
=== In ===
Pos.	Player	Transferred from	Fee	Date
MF	(Croatia) Alen Dizdarevic	(Slovenia) NK Maribor	-	19 August 2024
DF	(Netherlands) Amir Absalem	(Netherlands) ADO Den Haag	On loan	1 July 2024
MF	(Belgium) Axl Van Himbeeck	(Belgium) K Beerschot VA	Free	14 August 2024
FW	(Latvia) Dario Šits	(Italy) Parma Calcio 1913	On loan	18 July 2024
MF	(Iceland) Helgi Ingason	(Iceland) Stjarnan	-	14 August 2024
DF	(Germany) Jonas Scholz	(Germany) SC Fortuna Köln	Free	3 June 2024
DF	(Curaçao) Justin Ogenia	(Netherlands) FC Eindhoven	Free	3 June 2024
GK	(Netherlands) Kevin Aben	(Netherlands) SV Someren	Free	1 July 2024
DF	(Netherlands) Lars Zonneveld	(Netherlands) Helmond Sport U18	Free	1 July 2024
FW	(Belgium) Lennerd Daneels	(Netherlands) Roda JC Kerkrade	Free	1 July 2024
FW	(Netherlands) Onesime Zimuangana	(Netherlands) PSV academy	Free	5 June 2024
DF	(Morocco) Redouane Halhal	(Belgium) K.V. Mechelen	On loan	16 August 2024
MF	(Switzerland) Théo Golliard	(Switzerland) BSC Young Boys	On loan	27 August 2024
DF	(Germany) Tobias Pachonik	(Switzerland) FC Baden	Free	1 July 2024
GK	(Netherlands) Tom Hendriks	(Netherlands) Fortuna Sittard	Free	2 August 2024
DF	(Netherlands) Sem Dekkers	(Netherlands) Jong AZ	On loan	4 February 2025

=== Out ===
Pos.	Player	Transferred to	Fee	Date
DF	(Spain) Álvaro Marín	(Spain) Athletic Bilbao B	End of loan	30 June 2024
MF	(Belgium) Amin Doudah	(Belgium) K.V. Mechelen	End of loan	30 June 2024
MF	(Belgium) Arno Van Keilegom	(Belgium) K.F.C. Dessel Sport	Free	3 July 2024
DF	(Netherlands) Bram van Vlerken	No club	Released	1 July 2024
DF	(Netherlands) Doke Schmidt	No club	Released	1 July 2024
DF	(Netherlands) Elmo Lieftink	No club	Released	1 July 2024
MF	(Greece) Giannis Fivos Botos	(Czech Republic) SK Slavia Prague	€440,000	3 July 2024
FW	(Norway) Håkon Lorentzen	(Norway) IK Start	Free	18 July 2024
FW	(Netherlands) Joeri Schroyen	(Belgium) FC Wezel Sport	Free	21 July 2024
FW	(Belgium) Joseph Amuzu	(Belgium) K.V. Mechelen	End of loan	30 June 2024
MF	(Belgium) Lucas Vankerkhoven	(Belgium) Sporting Hasselt	Released	1 July 2024
FW	(Netherlands) Martijn Kaars	(Germany) 1. FC Magdeburg	€800,000	1 July 2024
DF	(Netherlands) Mees Kreekels	(Netherlands) Vitesse Arnhem	Free	7 August 2024
DF	(Netherlands) Michael Chacón	(Denmark) HB Køge	Free	15 July 2024
MF	(Netherlands) Peter van Ooijen	(Belgium) FC Wezel Sport	Free	18 July 2024
DF	(Germany) Pius Krätschmer	No club	Released	1 July 2024
GK	(Netherlands) Ramón ten Hove	(Netherlands) Kozakken Boys	Released	1 July 2024
GK	(Belgium) Robin Mantel	(Netherlands) Heracles Almelo	Free	1 July 2024

== Pre-season and friendlies ==
6 July 2024 Friendly	Fortuna Sittard	5-2	Helmond Sport	Nederweert-Eind
13:00				Stadium: Sportpark Op de Hooven

13 July 2024 Friendly	VV Gemert	0-2	Helmond Sport	Gemert
17:00			Lennerd Daneels 3'; Mohamed Mallahi	Stadium: Sportpark Molenbroek

20 July 2024 Friendly	Westerlo	0-0	Helmond Sport	Westerlo
18:00

24 July 2024 Friendly	Patro Eisden	0-0	Helmond Sport	Maasmechelen
11:00		Report

27 July 2024 Friendly	Valenciennes FC	2-4	Helmond Sport	Horst
14:00	Nick Venema 27'; Carnejy Antoine 70' (pen.)		Anthony van den Hurk 4' 55'; Dario Šits 40' 44'	Stadium: Sportpark Ter Horst

== Competitions ==
=== Overall record ===
Competition	First match	Last match	Starting round	Final position	Record							
Competition	First match	Last match	Starting round	Final position	Pld	W	D	L	GF	GA	GD	Win %
Eerste Divisie	9 August 2024	9 May 2025	Week 1	11th	38	12	10	16	53	61	−8	31.58
KNVB Cup	31 October 2024		1st round	1st round	1	0	0	1	0	3	−3	0.00
Total					39	12	10	17	53	64	−11	30.77

Source: ESPN

=== Eerste Divisie ===
==== Results summary ====
Overall								Home						Away					
Pld	W	D	L	GF	GA	GD	Pts	W	D	L	GF	GA	GD	W	D	L	GF	GA	GD
38	12	10	16	53	61	−8	46	7	6	6	30	24	+6	5	4	10	23	37	−14

Source: ESPN

==== Results by round ====
Round	1	2	3	4	5	6	7	8	9	10	11	12	13	14	15	16	17	18	19	20	21	22	23	24	25	26	27	28	29	30	31	32	33	34	35	36	37	38
Ground	H	A	A	H	A	H	H	A	H	A	H	A	H	A	H	H	A	H	A	A	A	H	A	H	A	H	H	A	H	A	H	A	H	A	H	A	A	H
Result	D	W	D	W	W	W	L	W	D	W	W	W	L	L	L	W	L	D	L	L	L	W	D	L	D	W	L	L	W	L	D	D	D	L	D	L	L	L
Position	11	5	7	1	1	1	3	3	2	2		1	1	2	5	4	5	6	7	9	10	9	10		10		9		10		11	11	10	12	11	13	13	13

Source: ESPN
A = Away; H = Home; W = Win; D = Draw; L = Loss

=== Matches ===
==== 1st half ====
9 August 2024 1st week	Helmond Sport	1-1	Jong Utrecht	Helmond
20:00	Anthony van den Hurk 25'	Report	Rafik El Arguioui 8'	Stadium: GS Staalwerken Stadion; Attendance: 1,833; Referee: Kevin Puts

18 August 2024 2nd week	SC Cambuur	0-1	Helmond Sport	Leeuwarden
12:15		Report	Dario Šits 25'	Stadium: Kooi Stadion; Attendance: 13,150; Referee: Allard Lindhout

23 August 2024 3rd week	FC Emmen	0-0	Helmond Sport	Emmen
20:00		Report		Stadium: De Oude Meerdijk; Attendance: 7,298; Referee: Wouter Wiersma

30 August 2024 4th week	Helmond Sport	3-0	VVV-Venlo	Helmond
20:00	Lennerd Daneels 27'; Anthony van den Hurk 71'; Jonas Scholz 90+1'	Report		Stadium: GS Staalwerken Stadion; Attendance: 2,034; Referee: Luuk Timmer

13 September 2024 5th week	De Graafschap	2–3	Helmond Sport	Doetinchem
20:00	Ibrahim El Kadiri 68'; Yannick Eduardo 90+1'	Report	Théo Golliard 12'; Dario Šits 27'; Jonas Scholz 83'	Stadium: De Vijverberg; Attendance: 10,325; Referee: Robin Hensgens

16 September 2024 6th week	Helmond Sport	1–0	TOP Oss	Helmond
20:00	Dario Šits 90+2'	Report		Stadium: GS Staalwerken Stadion; Attendance: 2,541; Referee: Erwin Blank

20 September 2024 7th week	Helmond Sport	2-3	FC Volendam	Helmond
20:00	Mohamed Mallahi 7'; Théo Golliard 73'	Report	Robert Mühren 21'; Henk Veerman 51'; Bryan Van Hove 90+2' (o.g.)	Stadium: GS Staalwerken Stadion; Attendance: 3,500; Referee: Alex Bos

30 September 2024 8th week	Jong PSV	1–3	Helmond Sport	Eindhoven
20:00	Marcus Younis 58'	Report	Lennerd Daneels 3'; Anthony van den Hurk 10'; Jonas Scholz 15'	Stadium: De Herdgang; Attendance: 975; Referee: Martijn Vos

4 October 2024 9th week	Helmond Sport	1-1	Jong Ajax	Helmond
20:00	Redouane Halhal 84'	Report	Kayden Wolff 53'	Stadium: GS Staalwerken Stadion; Attendance: 3,543; Referee: Laurens Gerrets

18 October 2024 10th week	Jong AZ	2–3	Helmond Sport	Wijdewormer
20:00	Jayen Gerold 44' 59'	Report	Théo Golliard 7' 57'; Justin Ogenia 72'	Stadium: AFAS Trainingscomplex; Attendance: 450; Referee: Thomas Hardeman

21 October 2024 11th week	Helmond Sport	2-1	Roda JC Kerkrade	Helmond
20:00	Lennerd Daneels 45'; Justin Ogenia 71'	Report	Patriot Sejdiu 54'	Stadium: GS Staalwerken Stadion; Attendance: 2,850; Referee: Joey Kooij

27 October 2024 12th week	MVV Maastricht	1-2	Helmond Sport	Maastricht
16:45	Ilano Silva Timas 23'	Report	Tobias Pachonik 25'; Dario Šits 78'	Stadium: De Geusselt; Attendance: 5,044; Referee: Martin van den Kerkhof

3 November 2024 13th week	Helmond Sport	0-1	Excelsior Rotterdam	Helmond
16:45		Report	Richie Omorowa 57'	Stadium: GS Staalwerken Stadion; Attendance: 3,034; Referee: Jannick Van Der Laan

10 November 2024 14th week	FC Dordrecht	4-0	Helmond Sport	Dordrecht
16:45	Jaden Slory 17'; Enrik Ostrc 46' (o.g.); Korede Osundina 65'; Rocco Robert Shein 73'	Report		Stadium: M-Scores Stadion; Attendance: 2,628; Referee: Alex Bos

22 November 2024 15th week	Helmond Sport	3-4	FC Eindhoven	Helmond
20:00	Helgi Ingason 47'; Anthony van den Hurk 54' 77' (pen.)	Report	Sven Blummel 5' 24'; Joey Sleegers 49'; Evan Rottier 88'	Stadium: GS Staalwerken Stadion; Attendance: 4,200; Referee: Marc Nagtegaal

25 November 2024 16th week	Helmond Sport	2-1	ADO Den Haag	Helmond
20:00	Tobias Pachonik 69'; Anthony van den Hurk 89' (pen.)	Report	Daryl van Mieghem 21'	Stadium: GS Staalwerken Stadion; Attendance: 2,034; Referee: Jochem Kamphuis

29 November 2024 17th week	SBV Vitesse	2-1	Helmond Sport	Arnhem
16:45	Miliano Jonathans 58'; Andy Visser 69'	Report	Mohamed Mallahi 56'	Stadium: GelreDome; Attendance: 14,512; Referee: Luuk Timmer

6 December 2024 18th week	Helmond Sport	0-0	FC Den Bosch	Helmond
20:00		Report		Stadium: GS Staalwerken Stadion; Attendance: 2,913; Referee: Erwin Blank

13 December 2024 19th week	SC Telstar	3-0	Helmond Sport	Velsen-Zuid
20:00	Zakaria Eddahchouri 32' 44' 69'	Report		Stadium: 711 Stadion; Attendance: 2,202; Referee: Laurens Gerrets

22 December 2024 20th week	Jong FC Utrecht	3-1	Helmond Sport	Utrecht
20:00	Georgios Charalampoglou 38' 68'; Rafik El Arguioui 54' (pen.)	Report	Onesime Zimuangana 33'	Stadium: Sportcomplex Zoudenbalch; Attendance: 341; Referee: Thomas Hardeman

==== 2nd half ====
17 January 2025 21st week	ADO Den Haag	3-1	Helmond Sport	The Hague
20:00	Alex Schalk 17'; Jari Vlak 56' 67'	Report	Théo Golliard 85'	Stadium: Bingoal Stadion; Attendance: 7,245; Referee: Robin Hensgens

26 January 2025 22nd week	Helmond Sport	2-1	Jong AZ	Helmond
16:45	Tobias Pachonik 28'; Jonas Scholz 45+1'	Report	Anthony Smits 72'	Stadium: GS Staalwerken Stadion; Attendance: 1,652; Referee: Robin Vereijken

2 February 2025 23rd week	TOP Oss	1-1	Helmond Sport	Oss
16:45	Arthur Allemeersch 68'	Report	Anthony van den Hurk 11' (pen.)	Stadium: Bingoal Stadion; Referee: Frans Heesen Stadion

8 February 2025 24th week	Helmond Sport	0-1	FC Dordrecht	Helmond
16:30		Report	Jaden Slory 2'	Stadium: GS Staalwerken Stadion; Attendance: 1,700; Referee: Joey Kooij

16 February 2025 25th week	Excelsior Rotterdam	1-1	Helmond Sport	Rotterdam
16:45	Richie Omorowa 83'	Report	Anthony van den Hurk 59'	Stadium: Van Donge & De Roo Stadion; Referee: Rob Dieperink

21 February 2025 26th week	Helmond Sport	3-0	SBV Vitesse	Helmond
20:00	Amin Doudah 8'; Anthony van den Hurk 33'; Théo Golliard 62'	Report		Stadium: GS Staalwerken Stadion; Attendance: 4,200; Referee: Robin Hensgens

24 February 2025 27th week	Helmond Sport	1-2	SBV Vitesse	Helmond
20:00	Tarik Essakkati 19'	Report	Franck Evina 33'; Alaa Bakir 67'	Stadium: GS Staalwerken Stadion; Attendance: 3,277; Referee: Ingmar Oostrom

28 February 2025 28th week	FC Volendam	3-1	Helmond Sport	Volendam
20:00	Robert Mühren 29'; Aurelio Oehlers 75' 89'	Report	Helgi Ingason 45+1'	Stadium: Kras Stadion; Attendance: 5,992; Referee: Ingmar Oostrom

7 March 2025 29th week	Helmond Sport	4-0	MVV Maastricht	Helmond
20:00	Anthony van den Hurk 10' 23'; Amin Doudah 14'; Dario Šits 78'	Report		Stadium: GS Staalwerken Stadion; Attendance: 3,000; Referee: Martin van den Kerkhof

11 March 2025 30th week	Roda JC Kerkrade	3-2	Helmond Sport	Kerkrade
20:00	Brian Koglin 17'; Khaled Razak 73'; Michael Breij 87'	Report	Anthony van den Hurk 11' (pen.) 39'	Stadium: Parkstad Limburg Stadion; Attendance: 6,378; Referee: Luuk Timmer

14 March 2025 31st week	Helmond Sport	1-1	Jong PSV	Helmond
20:00	Tarik Essakkati 6'	Report	Joel Van Den Berg 79'	Stadium: GS Staalwerken Stadion; Attendance: 2,600; Referee: Kevin Puts

28 March 2025 32nd week	FC Eindhoven	2-2	Helmond Sport	Eindhoven
20:00	Sven Blummel 42'; Boris van Schuppen 84' (pen.)	Report	Anthony van den Hurk 5'; Jonas Scholz 68'	Stadium: Jan Louwers Stadion; Attendance: 2,771; Referee: Massimiliano Ledda

5 April 2025 33rd week	Helmond Sport	2-2	SC Telstar	Helmond
16:30	Anthony van den Hurk 1'; Lennerd Daneels 18'	Report	Mo Hamdaoui 38'; Jeff Hardeveld 90+7'	Stadium: GS Staalwerken Stadion; Attendance: 2,900; Referee: Clay Ruperti

13 April 2025 34th week	VVV-Venlo	4-1	Helmond Sport	Venlo
16:45	Elias Sierra 41'; Bjorn van Zijl 70'; Navarone Foor 80'; Layee Kromah 90'	Report	Dario Šits 90'	Stadium: De Koel; Attendance: 5,147; Referee: Wouter Wiersma

18 April 2025 35th week	Helmond Sport	1-1	SC Cambuur	Helmond
20:00	Sam Bisselink 21'	Report	Remco Balk 23'	Stadium: GS Staalwerken Stadion; Attendance: 3,150; Referee: Martijn Vos

28 April 2025 36th week	Jong Ajax	1-0	Helmond Sport	Duivendrecht, Amsterdam
20:00	Dies Janse 85'	Report		Stadium: Sportpark De Toekomst; Attendance: 590; Referee: Kevin Puts

2 May 2025 37th week	FC Den Bosch	1-0	Helmond Sport	Den Bosch
20:00	Konstantinos Doumtsios 50'	Report		Stadium: De Vliert; Referee: Erwin Blank

9 May 2025 38th week	Helmond Sport	1-4	De Graafschap	Helmond
20:00	Jonas Scholz 24'	Report	Mimoun Mahi 31'; Jack Cooper-Love 50' 52'; Philip Brittijn 74'	Stadium: GS Staalwerken Stadion; Attendance: 3,350; Referee: Rick Sturm

=== KNVB Cup ===
31 October 2024 KNVB Beker 1st round	SC Telstar	3-0	Helmond Sport	Velsen-Zuid
20:00	Youssef El Kachati 50'; Nils Rossen 61'; Danny Bakker 65'	Report		Stadium: Sportpark Schoonenberg; Attendance: 1,543; Referee: Robin Vereijken

== Statistics ==
=== Scorers ===
#	Player	Eerste Divisie
1	(Netherlands) Anthony van den Hurk	15
2	(Latvia) Dario Šits	6
2	(Germany) Jonas Scholz	6
2	(Switzerland) Théo Golliard	6
5	(Belgium) Lennerd Daneels	4
6	(Germany) Tobias Pachonik	3
7	(Belgium) Amin Doudah	2
7	(Iceland) Helgi Ingason	2
7	(Curaçao) Justin Ogenia	2
7	(Netherlands) Mohamed Mallahi	2
7	(Netherlands) Tarik Essakkati	2
12	(Netherlands) Onesime Zimuangana	1
12	(Morocco) Redouane Halhal	1
12	(Netherlands) Sam Bisselink	1

=== Assists ===
As of 18 April 2025

#	Player	Eerste Divisie
1	(Belgium) Lennerd Daneels	5
1	(Switzerland) Théo Golliard	5
3	(Netherlands) Amir Absalem	4
4	(Netherlands) Anthony van den Hurk	3
4	(Latvia) Dario Šits	3
6	(Belgium) Amin Doudah	2
6	(Slovenia) Enrik Ostrc	2
6	(Iceland) Helgi Ingason	2
6	(Germany) Jonas Scholz	2
10	(Belgium) Axl Van Himbeeck	1
10	(Curaçao) Justin Ogenia	1
10	(Netherlands) Mohamed Mallahi	1
10	(Morocco) Redouane Halhal	1
10	(Netherlands) Tarik Essakkati	1
10	(Germany) Tobias Pachonik	1
10	(Netherlands) Wouter van der Steen	1

=== Appearances ===
#	Player	Eerste Divisie	KNVB	Total
1	(Belgium) Lennerd Daneels	37	1	38
2	(Switzerland) Théo Golliard	35	1	36
3	(Curaçao) Anthony van den Hurk	34	1	35
3	(Germany) Tobias Pachonik	34	1	35
5	(Iceland) Helgi Ingason	33	1	34
5	(Germany) Jonas Scholz	34	0	34
7	(Belgium) Bryan van Hove	32	1	33
7	(Netherlands) Tarik Essakkati	32	1	33
9	(Belgium) Axl Van Himbeeck	31	1	32
9	(Morocco) Redouane Halhal	32	0	32
9	(Netherlands) Wouter van der Steen	32	0	32
12	(Croatia) Alen Dizdarevic	30	1	31
12	(Slovenia) Enrik Ostrc	30	1	31
14	(Netherlands) Amir Absalem	29	0	29
15	(Curaçao) Justin Ogenia	25	1	26
16	(Latvia) Dario Šits	20	1	21
16	(Netherlands) Sam Bisselink	20	1	21
18	(Belgium) Amin Doudah	15	0	15
18	(Netherlands) Mohamed Mallahi	14	1	15
20	(Netherlands) Sem Dekkers	7	0	7
21	(Belgium) Flor Van den Eynden	6	0	6
22	(Netherlands) Onesime Zimuangana	5	0	5
23	(Netherlands) Tom Hendriks	3	1	4
24	(Netherlands) Kevin Aben	3	0	3
25	(Germany) Michel Ludwig	2	0	2
26	(Netherlands) Khalid El Arnouki	1	0	1

=== Clean sheets ===
#	Player	Eerste Divisie
1	(Netherlands) Wouter van der Steen	6
2	(Netherlands) Kevin Aben	1
Total		7

=== Disciplinary record ===
#	Player	Eerste Divisie	
#	Player	Booked	Sent off (straight red)
1	(Netherlands) Amir Absalem	9	1
2	(Netherlands) Anthony van den Hurk	5	1
3	(Latvia) Dario Šits	4	1
3	(Netherlands) Redouane Halhal	4	1
5	(Germany) Jonas Scholz	8	0
6	(Croatia) Alen Dizdarevic	5	0
7	(Belgium) Bryan Van Hove	4	0
7	(Slovenia) Enrik Ostrc	4	0
7	(Belgium) Lennerd Daneels	4	0
7	(Switzerland) Théo Golliard	4	0
11	(Belgium) Axl Van Himbeeck	3	0
11	(Iceland) Helgi Ingason	3	0
13	(Belgium) Amin Doudah	2	0
13	(Curaçao) Justin Ogenia	2	0
13	(Netherlands) Kevin Aben	2	0
13	(Netherlands) Mohamed Mallahi	2	0
17	(Belgium) Flor Van den Eynden	1	0
17	(Netherlands) Sam Bisselink	1	0
17	(Netherlands) Sem Dekkers	1	0
17	(Netherlands) Tarik Essakkati	1	0
17	(Germany) Tobias Pachonik	1	0
17	(Netherlands) Tom Hendriks	1	0
