= 2026–27 Willem II Tilburg season =

Willem II Tilburg
2026–27 season
- Head coach: Adrie Koster (interim)
- Stadium: Koning Willem II Stadion
- Eredivisie: 18th
- KNVB Cup: TBD
- Top goalscorer: League: Devin Haen (3); All: Devin Haen (3)
- Highest home attendance: 15,000 vs SC Heerenveen
- Lowest home attendance: 14,600 vs NEC / Excelsior
- Average home league attendance: 14,733
- Biggest defeat: 1–6 vs SC Cambuur (24 Oct 2026)
- All statistics correct as of 25 October 2026.

The 2026–27 season is the 131st year in the history of Willem II and their first season back in the Eredivisie following promotion. The club will also compete in the KNVB Cup.

== Players ==
=== Current squad ===
As of 10 September 2026

Note: Flags indicate national team as defined under FIFA eligibility rules; some limited exceptions apply. Players may hold more than one non-FIFA nationality.

| No. | Pos. | Nation | Player |
|---|---|---|---|
| 1 | GK | FRA | Thomas Didillon-Hödl |
| 2 | DF | BEL | Alessandro Ciranni |
| 3 | DF | NED | Finn Stam |
| 4 | DF | NED | Justin Hoogma (2nd captain) |
| 5 | DF | NED | Hidde ter Avest |
| 6 | MF | NED | Calvin Twigt |
| 7 | FW | NED | Jaden Slory (on loan from Feyenoord) |
| 8 | MF | NED | Kasper Boogaard (on loan from AZ Alkmaar) |
| 9 | FW | NED | Devin Haen |
| 10 | MF | NED | Jari Schuurman (captain) |
| 11 | FW | SWE | Armin Ćulum |
| 14 | DF | NED | Jens Mathijsen |
| 15 | DF | MAR | Amine Et-Taïbi |
| 17 | FW | DEN | Chido Obi (on loan from Manchester United U21) |
| 18 | MF | NED | Anass Zarrouk |

| No. | Pos. | Nation | Player |
|---|---|---|---|
| 19 | MF | NED | Uriël van Aalst |
| 20 | MF | NED | Thijs Muller |
| 21 | GK | NED | Wouter van der Steen |
| 22 | DF | NED | Per van Loon |
| 23 | DF | NED | Maxim Dekker |
| 24 | DF | IDN | Nathan Tjoe-A-On |
| 26 | GK | BEL | Maxime Delanghe (on loan from Cercle Brugge) |
| 28 | FW | NED | Thomas Verheydt |
| 31 | GK | NED | Karst de Leeuw |
| 32 | MF | NED | Vito van Crooij |
| 34 | MF | NED | Amine Lachkar |
| 50 | FW | NED | Eser Gürbüz (on loan from Heerenveen) |
| 52 | MF | NED | Tonny Vilhena |
| 83 | DF | BEL | Mats Lemmens |

== Transfers ==
=== In ===
| Pos. | Player | Transferred from | Fee | Date | Source |
|---|---|---|---|---|---|
| DF | (Netherlands) Finn Stam | (Netherlands) AZ | €400.000 | 1 July 2026 | |
| MF | (Netherlands) Jaden Slory | (Netherlands) Feyenoord | Loan | 7 July 2026 | |
| DF | (Belgium) Mats Lemmens | (Belgium) RWDM Brussels | Free transfer | 23 July 2026 | |
| MF | (Netherlands) Kasper Boogaard | (Netherlands) AZ | Loan | 23 July 2026 | |
| FW | (Netherlands) Eser Gürbüz | (Netherlands) Heerenveen | Loan | 23 July 2026 | |
| DF | (Netherlands) Hidde ter Avest | (England) Oxford United | Free transfer | 28 July 2026 | |
| MF | (Netherlands) Calvin Twigt | (Netherlands) Go Ahead Eagles | Undisclosed | 17 August 2026 | |
| MF | (Netherlands) Tonny Vilhena | (Greece) Panathinaikos | Free transfer | 26 August 2026 | |

=== Out ===
| Pos. | Player | Transferred to | Fee | Date | Source |
|---|---|---|---|---|---|
| FW | (Germany) Samuel Bamba | (Germany) VfL Bochum | Loan return | 30 June 2026 | |
| MF | (Netherlands) Gijs Besselink | (Netherlands) Twente | Loan return | 30 June 2026 | |
| MF | (Netherlands) Calvin Twigt | (Netherlands) Go Ahead Eagles | Loan return | 30 June 2026 | |
| DF | (Austria) Raffael Behounek | (Austria) Wolfsberger AC | End of contract | 1 July 2026 | |
| MF | (Netherlands) Nick Doodeman | (Netherlands) Volendam | End of contract | 1 July 2026 | |
| MF | (Netherlands) Mounir El Allouchi | | End of contract | 1 July 2026 | |

== Pre-season ==
| 29 June 2026 Friendly | RKDSV (Netherlands) | 0–11 | (Netherlands) Willem II |
| 19:00 |

| 4 July 2026 Friendly | Willem II (Netherlands) | 1–2 | (Netherlands) Quick Boys |
| 14:00 | 43' (o.g.) | | 64'; 84' |

| 11 July 2026 Friendly | Willem II (Netherlands) | 2–2 | (Netherlands) Eindhoven |
| 11:00 |

| 25 July 2026 Friendly | Willem II (Netherlands) | 1–0 | (Belgium) Mechelen |
| 14:00 |

== Competitions ==
=== Overall record ===
| Competition | Starting round | Record | | | | | | | |
| Competition | Starting round | Pld | W | D | L | GF | GA | GD | Win % |
|---|---|---|---|---|---|---|---|---|---|
| Eredivisie | Matchday 1 | 10 | 0 | 2 | 8 | 10 | 32 | −22 | 0.00 |
| KNVB Cup | First round | 1 | 1 | 0 | 0 | 3 | 4 | −1 | 100.00 |
| Total | | 11 | 1 | 2 | 8 | 13 | 36 | −23 | 9.09 |

Source: Competitions

=== Eredivisie ===
| Pos | Team | Pld | W | D | L | GF | GA | GD | Pts | Qualification or relegation |
|---|---|---|---|---|---|---|---|---|---|---|
| 14 | Sparta Rotterdam | 10 | 2 | 3 | 5 | 17 | 24 | −7 | 9 | |
| 15 | PEC Zwolle | 10 | 2 | 2 | 6 | 11 | 23 | −12 | 8 | |
| 16 | Telstar | 10 | 1 | 3 | 6 | 12 | 21 | −9 | 6 | Qualification for the Relegation play-off |
| 17 | ADO Den Haag | 10 | 1 | 3 | 6 | 13 | 23 | −10 | 6 | Relegation to Eerste Divisie |
| 18 | Willem II | 11 | 0 | 2 | 9 | 10 | 39 | −29 | 2 | Relegation to Eerste Divisie |

Updated to match(es) played on 31 October 2026. Source: Eredivisie
Rules for classification: 1) Points; 2) Less loss points; 3) Goal difference; 4) Goals scored; 5) Head-to-head points; 6) Head-to-head goal difference; 7) Head-to-head away goals scored; 9) Play-off if relevant for deciding champion, relegation or participating in a European league, otherwise by draw. 9) Penalty shoot-out (only after a play-off)

==== Results summary ====
| Overall | | | | | | | | Home | | | | | | Away | | | | | |
| Pld | W | D | L | GF | GA | GD | Pts | W | D | L | GF | GA | GD | W | D | L | GF | GA | GD |
|---|---|---|---|---|---|---|---|---|---|---|---|---|---|---|---|---|---|---|---|
| 11 | 0 | 2 | 9 | 10 | 39 | −29 | 2 | 0 | 1 | 4 | 4 | 16 | −12 | 0 | 1 | 5 | 6 | 23 | −17 |

Last updated: 31 October 2026.
Source: Eredivisie

==== Matches ====
The league fixtures were announced on 9 June 2026.

| 8 August 2026 1 | Go Ahead Eagles | 4–1 | Willem II | Deventer |
| 18:45 CEST (UTC+2) | Tengstedt 30'; Meulensteen 61'; Flataker 63'; Dirksen 69' | Report | Haen 13' | Stadium: De Adelaarshorst; Attendance: 9,288; Referee: Robin Hensgens |

| 15 August 2026 2 | Willem II | 1–4 | NEC | Tilburg |
| 16:30 CEST (UTC+2) | Verheydt 77' | Report | Tahaui 45+2'; Chery 54'; Linssen 64'; Sierhuis 67' | Stadium: Koning Willem II Stadion; Attendance: 14,600; Referee: Serdar Gözübüyük |

| 15 September 2026 3 | Ajax | 5–1 | Willem II | Amsterdam |
| 20:00 CEST (UTC+2) | Klaassen 41'; Brandt 45'; Tsygankov 69'; Gloukh 74'; Dolberg 87' | Report | Ciranni 76' | Stadium: Johan Cruyff Arena; Attendance: 54,018; Referee: Allard Lindhout |

| 30 August 2026 4 | Willem II | 2–2 | Heerenveen | Tilburg |
| 14:30 CEST (UTC+2) | Van Aalst 61'; Haen 82' | Report | Trenskow 64'; Braude 77' | Stadium: Koning Willem II Stadion; Attendance: 15,000; Referee: Jannick van der Laan |

| 5 September 2026 5 | Willem II | 0–3 | Excelsior | Tilburg |
| 21:00 CEST (UTC+2) | | Report | Garden 20'; Meissen 43'; Yegoian 85' | Stadium: Koning Willem II Stadion; Attendance: 14,600; Referee: Robin Hensgens |

| 11 September 2026 6 | AZ | 1–1 | Willem II | Alkmaar |
| 20:00 CEST (UTC+2) | Clasie 32' | Report | Haen 81' | Stadium: AFAS Stadion; Attendance: 18,540; Referee: Martin van den Kerkhof |

| 19 September 2026 7 | Willem II | 0–1 | Fortuna Sittard | Tilburg |
| 21:00 CEST (UTC+2) | | Report | Brittijn 80' | Stadium: Koning Willem II Stadion; Attendance: 14,900; Referee: Jeroen Manschot |

| 11 October 2026 8 | Utrecht | 3–1 | Willem II | Utrecht |
| 12:15 CEST (UTC+2) | Cathline 53' (?); Alarcón 90+2' | Report | Slory 60' | Stadium: Stadion Galgenwaard; Attendance: 21,000; Referee: Jannick van der Laan |

| 17 October 2026 9 | Sparta Rotterdam | 3–2 | Willem II | Rotterdam |
| 21:00 CEST (UTC+2) | Toornstra 39'; Martes 50'; Zonneveld 57' | Report | Vilhena 17'; Van Aalst 68' | Stadium: Het Kasteel; Attendance: 10,500; Referee: Danny Makkelie |

| 24 October 2026 10 | Willem II | 1–6 | Cambuur | Tilburg |
| 18:45 CEST (UTC+2) | Zarrouk 82' | Report | Binder 9', 58'; Hamache 13'; Baouf 18'; El Arguioui 62'; Ceka 89' | Stadium: Koning Willem II Stadion; Attendance: 14,200; Referee: Jeroen Manschot |

| 31 October 2026 11 | PSV | 7–0 | Willem II | Eindhoven |
| 18:45 CET (UTC+1) | Mauro Jr. 20'; Til 44'; Mijnans 50'; Van Bommel 53'; Pepi 73'; Sano 77'; Cornecion 81' | Report | | Stadium: Philips Stadion; Referee: Danny Makkelie |

| 6 November 2026 12 | Willem II | v | PEC Zwolle | Tilburg |
| 20:00 CET (UTC+1) | | Report | | Stadium: Koning Willem II Stadion |

| 22 November 2026 13 | Twente | v | Willem II | Enschede |
| 12:15 CET (UTC+1) | | Report | | Stadium: De Grolsch Veste |

| 27 November 2026 14 | Groningen | v | Willem II | Groningen |
| 20:00 CET (UTC+1) | | Report | | Stadium: Euroborg |

| 5 December 2026 15 | Willem II | v | Feyenoord | Tilburg |
| 16:30 CET (UTC+1) | | Report | | Stadium: Koning Willem II Stadion |

| 13 December 2026 16 | Willem II | v | ADO Den Haag | Tilburg |
| 14:30 CET (UTC+1) | | Report | | Stadium: Koning Willem II Stadion |

| 18 December 2026 17 | Telstar | v | Willem II | Velsen |
| 20:00 CET (UTC+1) | | Report | | Stadium: 711 Stadion |

| 9 January 2027 18 | Willem II | v | Ajax | Tilburg |
| 20:00 CET (UTC+1) | | Report | | Stadium: Koning Willem II Stadion |

| 17 January 2027 19 | Cambuur | v | Willem II | Leeuwarden |
| 16:30 CET (UTC+1) | | Report | | Stadium: Kooi Stadion |

| 24 January 2027 20 | NEC | v | Willem II | Nijmegen |
| 20:00 CET (UTC+1) | | Report | | Stadium: Goffertstadion |

| 30 January 2027 21 | Willem II | v | PSV | Tilburg |
| 20:00 CET (UTC+1) | | Report | | Stadium: Koning Willem II Stadion |

| 13 February 2027 22 | Willem II | v | Sparta Rotterdam | Tilburg |
| 20:00 CET (UTC+1) | | Report | | Stadium: Koning Willem II Stadion |

| 20 February 2027 23 | Heerenveen | v | Willem II | Heerenveen |
| 20:00 CET (UTC+1) | | Report | | Stadium: Abe Lenstra Stadion |

| 27 February 2027 24 | Willem II | v | Groningen | Tilburg |
| 20:00 CET (UTC+1) | | Report | | Stadium: Koning Willem II Stadion |

| 6 March 2027 25 | PEC Zwolle | v | Willem II | Zwolle |
| 20:00 CET (UTC+1) | | Report | | Stadium: MAC³PARK Stadion |

| 13 March 2027 26 | Willem II | v | Twente | Tilburg |
| 20:00 CET (UTC+1) | | Report | | Stadium: Koning Willem II Stadion |

| 20 March 2027 27 | ADO Den Haag | v | Willem II | The Hague |
| 20:00 CET (UTC+1) | | Report | | Stadium: WerkTalent Stadion |

| 3 April 2027 28 | Willem II | v | Utrecht | Tilburg |
| 20:00 CEST (UTC+2) | | Report | | Stadium: Koning Willem II Stadion |

| 10 April 2027 29 | AZ | v | Willem II | Alkmaar |
| 20:00 CEST (UTC+2) | | Report | | Stadium: AFAS Stadion |

| 24 April 2027 30 | Excelsior | v | Willem II | Rotterdam |
| 20:00 CEST (UTC+2) | | Report | | Stadium: Van Donge & De Roo Stadion |

| 1 May 2027 31 | Feyenoord | v | Willem II | Rotterdam |
| 20:00 CEST (UTC+2) | | Report | | Stadium: De Kuip |

| 8 May 2027 32 | Willem II | v | Telstar | Tilburg |
| 20:00 CEST (UTC+2) | | Report | | Stadium: Koning Willem II Stadion |

| 16 May 2027 33 | Fortuna Sittard | v | Willem II | Sittard |
| 14:30 CEST (UTC+2) | | Report | | Stadium: Fortuna Sittard Stadion |

| 23 May 2027 34 | Willem II | v | Go Ahead Eagles | Tilburg |
| 14:30 CEST (UTC+2) | | Report | | Stadium: Koning Willem II Stadion |

=== KNVB Cup ===
| 28 October 2026 First round | Helmond Sport | 3–4 | Willem II | Helmond |
| 20:00 CET (UTC+1) | Golliard 33'; Sits 45'; Ogenia 67' | Report | Haen 28'; Gürbüz 40', 42'; Vilhena 53' | Stadium: GS Staalwerken Stadion; Attendance: 4,200; Referee: Jochem Kamphuis |

| 1 December 2026 Second round | Willem II | v | Excelsior | Tilburg |
| | | | | Stadium: Koning Willem II Stadion |
