= 2023–24 KV Mechelen season =

K.V. Mechelen
2023–24 season
- Manager: Steven Defour (until 2 November); Besnik Hasi (from 8 November)
- Stadium: AFAS Stadion
- Belgian Pro League Regular season: 8th
- Europe Play-offs: 2nd
- Belgian Cup: Seventh round
- Belgian Super Cup: Runners-up
- Top goalscorer: League: Kerim Mrabti (8); All: Kerim Mrabti (9)
- Average home league attendance: 13,156
- Biggest win: Mechelen 4–0 Union Saint-Gilloise
- Biggest defeat: Genk 4–0 Mechelen

The 2023–24 season was K.V. Mechelen's 120th season in existence and fifth consecutive in the Belgian Pro League. They also competed in the Belgian Cup.

== Players ==
=== First-team squad ===
As of 1 February 2024

Note: Flags indicate national team as defined under FIFA eligibility rules; some limited exceptions apply. Players may hold more than one non-FIFA nationality.

No.	Pos.	Nation	Player
1	GK	BEL	Gaëtan Coucke
4	MF	BEL	Toon Raemaekers
5	DF	IDN	Sandy Walsh
6	MF	BEL	Jannes Van Hecke
7	MF	BEL	Geoffry Hairemans
8	MF	GUI	Mory Konaté
11	FW	BEL	Nikola Storm
13	FW	ALG	Islam Slimani
15	GK	BEL	Yannick Thoelen
16	MF	BEL	Rob Schoofs
17	DF	ALG	Rafik Belghali
19	FW	SWE	Kerim Mrabti
20	FW	GER	Lion Lauberbach
21	DF	BEL	Boli Bolingoli

No.	Pos.	Nation	Player
22	DF	BEL	Elias Cobbaut (on loan from Parma)
23	MF	BEL	Daam Foulon
27	DF	SCO	David Bates
29	MF	BEL	Bas Van den Eynden
31	GK	BEL	Oskar Annell
34	MF	COD	Ngal'ayel Mukau
35	MF	BEL	Bilal Bafdili
36	MF	BEL	Dirk Asare
37	DF	BEL	Thibau Loeman
40	GK	BEL	Jannes Van Hof
42	FW	ZIM	Munashe Garananga
70	FW	BEL	Norman Bassette (on loan from Caen)
77	FW	GER	Patrick Pflücke

=== Out on loan ===
Note: Flags indicate national team as defined under FIFA eligibility rules; some limited exceptions apply. Players may hold more than one non-FIFA nationality.

No.	Pos.	Nation	Player
—	DF	BEL	Dimitri Lavalée (at Sturm Graz until 30 June 2024)
—	DF	BEL	Iebe Swers (at Patro Eisden until 30 June 2024)
—	DF	BEL	Alec Van Hoorenbeeck (at Twente until 30 June 2024)

No.	Pos.	Nation	Player
—	MF	BEL	Amin Doudah (at Helmond until 30 June 2024)
—	FW	BEL	Julien Ngoy (at Kasımpaşa until 30 June 2024)

== Transfers ==
=== In ===
Pos.	Player	Transferred from	Fee	Date	Source
DF	(Belgium) Rafik Belghali	(Belgium) Lommel	€400,000	1 July 2023	
MF	(Belgium) Daam Foulon	(Italy) Benevento	Free	7 July 2023	
MF	(Guinea) Mory Konaté	(Belgium) Sint-Truiden	Free	13 July 2023	
MF	(Belgium) Amin Doudah	(Netherlands) Jong PSV	Free	26 July 2023	
MF	(Germany) Patrick Pflücke	(Switzerland) Servette	€500,000	21 August 2023	
FW	(Belgium) Norman Bassette	(France) Caen	Loan	1 September 2023	
DF	(Belgium) Elias Cobbaut	(Italy) Parma	Loan	5 September 2023	
DF	(Zimbabwe) Munashe Garananga	(Moldova) Sheriff Tiraspol	€350,000	1 February 2024	
FW	(Algeria) Islam Slimani	(Brazil) Curitiba	Free	1 February 2024	

=== Out ===
Pos.	Player	Transferred to	Fee	Date	Source
FW	(Cape Verde) Alessio da Cruz	(Italy) Feralpisalò	€500,000	1 July 2023	
MF	(Cameroon) Samuel Oum Gouet	(Switzerland) Yverdon-Sport	Undisclosed	26 July 2023	
MF	(Belgium) Amin Doudah	(Netherlands) Helmond Sport	Loan	27 July 2023	

== Pre-season and friendlies ==
Win Draw Loss Fixtures

1 July 2023 Friendly	Rupel Boom (Belgium)	0–3	(Belgium) Mechelen	Boom
16:00 UTC+2				Stadium: Gemeentelijk Parkstadion

8 July 2023 Friendly	Beveren (Belgium)	0–3	(Belgium) Mechelen	Beveren
16:00 UTC+2				Stadium: Waasland-Beveren Jeugdcomplex

14 July 2023 Friendly	Mechelen (Belgium)	3–2	(Israel) Maccabi Netanya	Netherlands
15:00 UTC+2

10 January 2024 Friendly	Hertha BSC (Germany)	0–3	(Belgium) Mechelen	San Pedro del Pinatar, Spain
15:00 CET (UTC+1)	Zeefuik (red card) 76'		Pflücke 23', 29'; Asante 90+1'	Stadium: Pinatar Arena Football Center

== Competitions ==
=== Overall record ===
Competition	First match	Last match	Starting round	Final position	Record							
Competition	First match	Last match	Starting round	Final position	Pld	W	D	L	GF	GA	GD	Win %
Belgian Pro League Regular season	30 July 2023	17 March 2024	Matchday 1	8th	30	13	6	11	39	34	+5	43.33
Europe Play-offs	29 March 2024	25 May 2024	Matchday 1	2nd	10	5	1	4	20	18	+2	50.00
Belgian Cup	31 October 2023		Seventh round	Seventh round	1	0	1	0	1	1	+0	0.00
Belgian Super Cup	23 July 2023		Final	Runners-up	1	0	1	0	1	1	+0	0.00
Total					42	18	9	15	61	54	+7	42.86

Source: Soccerway

=== Belgian Pro League ===
==== Regular season ====
Pos	Team	Pld	W	D	L	GF	GA	GD	Pts	Qualification or relegation
6	Genk	30	12	11	7	51	31	+20	47	Qualification for the champions' play-offs
7	Gent	30	12	11	7	53	38	+15	47	Qualification for the Europe play-offs
8	Mechelen	30	13	6	11	39	34	+5	45	Qualification for the Europe play-offs
9	Sint-Truiden	30	10	10	10	35	46	−11	40	Qualification for the Europe play-offs
10	Standard Liège	30	8	10	12	33	41	−8	34	Qualification for the Europe play-offs

Source: Jupiler Pro League (in Dutch), Soccerway
Rules for classification: 1) Points; 2) Matches won; 3) Goal difference; 4) Goals scored; 5) Away matches won; 6) Away goal difference; 7) Away goals scored; 8) Play-off.

==== Results summary ====
Overall								Home						Away					
Pld	W	D	L	GF	GA	GD	Pts	W	D	L	GF	GA	GD	W	D	L	GF	GA	GD
30	13	6	11	39	34	+5	45	7	4	4	22	12	+10	6	2	7	17	22	−5

Source: Worldfootball

==== Results by round ====
Round	1	2	3	4	5	6	7	8	9	10	11	12	13	14	15	16	17	18	19	20	21	22	23	24	25	26	27	28	29	30
Ground	A	H	A	H	A	H	A	H	H	A	A	H	A	H	A	H	H	A	H	A	A	H	H	A	H	A	H	A	H	A
Result	D	L	L	W	W	W	L	L	D	L	L	L	D	W	W	L	D	L	W	L	W	W	D	W	D	W	W	W	W	L
Position																														

Source: Worldfootball
A = Away; H = Home; W = Win; D = Draw; L = Loss

==== Matches ====
The league fixtures were unveiled on 22 June 2023.

30 July 2023 1	Club Brugge	1–1	Mechelen	Bruges
18:30 UTC+2	De Cuyper (yellow card) 37' (yellow-red card) 77'; Thiago 65'	Report	Ngoy (yellow card) 14'; Foulon (yellow card) 26'; Schoofs 38'	Stadium: Jan Breydel Stadium; Referee: Bert Put

6 August 2023 2	Mechelen	0–1	Gent	Mechelen
16:00 UTC+2	Belghali (yellow card) 35'; Hairemans (yellow card) 90+1'; Schoofs (penalty missed) 90+5'	Report	Lavalée 54' (o.g.); Cuypers (yellow card) 65'; Hjulsager (yellow card) 66'; Fortuna (yellow card) 85'	Stadium: AFAS Stadion; Referee: Nicolas Laforge

12 August 2023 3	RWD Molenbeek	1–0	Mechelen	Molenbeek-Saint-Jean
16:00 UTC+2	Biron 74'; Klaus (yellow card) 84'; Defourny (yellow card) 90+1'; Rikelmi (yellow card) 90+4'	Report	Malede (yellow card) 90+5'	Stadium: Edmond Machtens Stadium; Referee: Bram Van Driessche

19 August 2023 4	Mechelen	4–0	Union Saint-Gilloise	Mechelen
20:45 UTC+2	Mrabti 38'; Hairemans 78'; Belghali 89'; Bates 90+4'	Report	Lazare (yellow card) 83'; Puertas (yellow card) 90+4'	Stadium: AFAS Stadion; Referee: Wim Smet

26 August 2023 5	Westerlo	2–3	Mechelen	Westerlo
16:00 UTC+2	Stassin 20'; Frigan 28'	Report	Storm (yellow card) 40'; Bates (yellow card) 45+5'; Schoofs 75'; Madsen 77' (o.g.); Lauberbach 84'	Stadium: Het Kuipje; Referee: Brent Staessens

2 September 2023 6	Mechelen	1–0	Eupen	Mechelen
18:15 UTC+2	Lauberbach 81'	Report	Lambert (yellow card) 85'	Stadium: AFAS Stadion; Referee: Bert Put

17 September 2023 7	Sint-Truiden	2–0	Mechelen	Sint-Truiden
19:15				Stadium: Stayen; Referee: Jasper Vergoote

23 September 2023 8	Mechelen	1–2	OH Leuven	Mechelen
18:15				Stadium: AFAS Stadion; Referee: Nathan Verboomen

30 September 2023 9	Mechelen	0–0	Antwerp	Mechelen
20:45				Stadium: AFAS Stadion; Referee: Jan Boterberg

7 October 2023 10	Anderlecht	3–1	Mechelen	Brussels
20:45				Stadium: Constant Vanden Stock Stadium; Referee: Nicolas Laforge

22 October 2023 11	Genk	4–0	Mechelen	Genk
13:30				Stadium: Cegeka Arena; Referee: Jan Boterberg

28 October 2023 12	Mechelen	0–2	Cercle Brugge	Mechelen
16:00				Stadium: AFAS Stadion; Referee: Erik Lambrechts

5 November 2023 13	Standard Liège	1–1	Mechelen	Liège
16:00				Stadium: Stade Maurice Dufrasne; Referee: Kevin Van Damme

11 November 2023 14	Mechelen	1–0	Charleroi	Mechelen
20:45				Stadium: AFAS Stadion; Referee: Wesli De Cremer

26 November 2023 15	Kortrijk	0–3	Mechelen	Kortrijk
19:15				Stadium: Guldensporen Stadion; Referee: Jan Boterberg

3 December 2023 16	Mechelen	0–2	Sint-Truiden	Mechelen
16:00				Stadium: AFAS Stadion; Referee: Wim Smet

10 December 2023 17	Mechelen	0–0	Club Brugge	Mechelen
13:30				Stadium: AFAS Stadion; Referee: Nicolas Laforge

17 December 2023 18	Union Saint-Gilloise	1–0	Mechelen	Brussels
16:00				Stadium: Stade Joseph Marien; Referee: Bert Put

20 December 2023 19	Mechelen	3–0	Standard Liège	Mechelen
20:45				Stadium: AFAS Stadion; Referee: Jan Boterberg

27 December 2023 20	Charleroi	3–1	Mechelen	Charleroi
20:45				Stadium: Stade du Pays de Charleroi; Referee: Wesli De Cremer

19 January 2024 21	Gent	1–2	Mechelen	Ghent
20:45				Stadium: Ghelamco Arena; Referee: Jonathan Lardot

28 January 2024 22	Mechelen	3–1	RWDM	Mechelen
19:15				Stadium: AFAS Stadion; Referee: Brent Staessens

1 February 2024 23	Mechelen	2–2	Anderlecht	Mechelen
20:30				Stadium: AFAS Stadion; Referee: Wesli De Cremer

4 February 2024 24	Eupen	0–1	Mechelen	Eupen
16:00				Stadium: Kehrwegstadion; Referee: Simon Bourdeaud'Hui

11 February 2024 25	Mechelen	1–1	Genk	Mechelen
16:00				Stadium: AFAS Stadion; Referee: Bram Van Driessche

17 February 2024 26	Antwerp	0–1	Mechelen	Antwerp
20:45				Stadium: Bosuilstadion; Referee: Wesli De Cremer

24 February 2024 27	Mechelen	3–0	Kortrijk	Mechelen
20:45				Stadium: AFAS Stadion; Referee: Lawrence Wisser

2 March 2024 28	Cercle Brugge	2–3	Mechelen	Bruges
16:00	Minda 21'; Felipe Augusto 44'		Mrabti 41'; Hairemans 45+1'; Bafdili 85'	Stadium: Jan Breydel Stadium; Referee: Jan Boterberg

8 March 2024 29	Mechelen	3–1	Westerlo	Mechelen
20:45	Mrabti 11', 37'; Pflücke 73'		Bos 90'	Stadium: AFAS Stadion; Referee: Nathan Verboomen

17 March 2024 30	OH Leuven	1–0	Mechelen	Leuven
18:30	Nsingi 90+3'			Stadium: Den Dreef; Referee: Jonathan Lardot

==== Results summary ====
Overall								Home						Away					
Pld	W	D	L	GF	GA	GD	Pts	W	D	L	GF	GA	GD	W	D	L	GF	GA	GD
10	5	1	4	20	18	+2	16	3	0	2	13	11	+2	2	1	2	7	7	0

Source: Worldfootball

==== Results by round ====
Round	1	2	3	4	5	6	7	8	9	10
Ground	A	H	H	A	A	H	H	A	A	H
Result	W	L	W	L	D	W	L	L	W	W
Position	2	3	2	2	2	2	2	2	2	2

Source: Worldfootball
A = Away; H = Home; W = Win; D = Draw; L = Loss

==== Matches ====
30 March 2024 1	OH Leuven	2–3	Mechelen	Leuven
18:15				Stadium: Den Dreef; Referee: Kevin Van Damme

5 April 2024 2	Mechelen	2–3	Sint-Truiden	Mechelen
20:45				Stadium: AFAS Stadion; Referee: Sebastian Gishamer (Austria)

13 April 2024 3	Mechelen	3–2	Westerlo	Mechelen
18:15				Stadium: AFAS Stadion; Referee: Arthur Denil

20 April 2024 4	Gent	3–1	Mechelen	Ghent
20:00				Stadium: Planet Group Arena; Referee: Erik Lambrechts

23 April 2024 5	Standard Liège	0–0	Mechelen	Liège
20:30				Stadium: Stade Maurice Dufrasne; Referee: Michiel Allaerts

27 April 2024 6	Mechelen	3–0	OH Leuven	Mechelen
16:00				Stadium: AFAS Stadion; Referee: Bram Van Driessche

4 May 2024 7	Mechelen	2–4	Gent	Mechelen
18:15	Hairemans 19'; Slimani 32'		Fernandez-Pardo 25'; Mitrović 42'; Tissoudali 45+4'; Hjulsager 86'	Stadium: AFAS Stadion; Referee: Jan Boterberg

12 May 2024 8	Sint-Truiden	2–1	Mechelen	Sint-Truiden
16:00	Bertaccini 17', 39'		Konaté 9'	Stadium: Stayen; Referee: Ken Vermeiren

18 May 2024 9	Westerlo	0–2	Mechelen	Westerlo
18:15		Report	Bafdili 25'; Belghali 90'	Stadium: Het Kuipje; Referee: Matonga Simonini

25 May 2024 10	Mechelen	3–2	Standard Liège	Mechelen
20:30	Lauberbach 15', 17', 90'; Bolingoli (yellow card) 68'; Foulon (yellow card) 90+6'	Report	Lawrence 51'; Benjdida 84'	Stadium: AFAS Stadion; Referee: Wim Smet

=== Belgian Cup ===
31 October 2023 Seventh round	Knokke	1–1 (a.e.t.) (5–4 p)	Mechelen	Knokke
20:00	Vanraefelghem 114'	Report	Mrabti 107'	Stadium: Burgemeester Graaf Leopold Lippens Park; Referee: Arne De Beuckelaer
	Penalties
	Aelterman (penalty scored); Bailly (penalty scored); Jalloh (penalty scored); Vanraefelghem (penalty scored); Coninckx (penalty scored)		(penalty missed) Vanlerberghe; (penalty scored) Cobbaut; (penalty scored) Hairemans; (penalty scored) Badili; (penalty scored) Lauberbach

=== Belgian Super Cup ===
29 July 2023 Match	Antwerp	1–1 (a.e.t.) (5–4 p)	Mechelen	Bruges
18:00 UTC+2	Balikwisha 9'; Kerk (yellow card) 58'; Ávila (red card) 69'	Report	Foulon (yellow card) 47'; Yusuf (yellow card) 55'; De Laet 78' (o.g.); Mrabti (yellow card) 85'	Stadium: Bosuilstadion; Referee: Lawrence Visser
	Penalties
	Vines (penalty missed); Ilenikhena (penalty scored); Van Den Bosch (penalty missed); Vermeeren (penalty scored); Alderweireld (penalty scored); Butez (penalty scored); Scott (penalty scored)		(penalty scored) Schoofs; (penalty scored) Mrabti; (penalty missed) Vanlerberghe; (penalty missed) Lauberbach; (penalty scored) Storm; (penalty scored) Ngoy; (penalty missed) Lavalée
