= 2007–08 Helmond Sport season =

Helmond Sport
2007–08 season
- Stadium: GS Staalwerken Stadion
- Eerste Divisie: 7th
- Promotion play-offs: Round 2
- KNVB Cup: First round
- Top goalscorer: League: Jordan Remacle (9); All: Jordan Remacle (9)

The 2007–08 season was Helmond Sport's 41st season in existence and 24th consecutive in the Eerste Divisie, the second division of Dutch football. They also competed in the KNVB Cup.

== Players ==
=== First-team squad ===
Note: Flags indicate national team as defined under FIFA eligibility rules; some limited exceptions apply. Players may hold more than one non-FIFA nationality.

No.	Pos.	Nation	Player
—	GK	NED	Robert van Westerop
—	GK	NED	Remond Strijbosch
—	DF	NED	Jan Willem van der Putten
—	DF	NED	Peter Uneken
—	DF	NED	René Paardekooper
—	DF	NED	Ruud Jansen
—	DF	NED	Guus Joppen
—	DF	NED	Hesdey Suart
—	DF	BEL	Sidney Lammens
—	MF	NED	Ilja van Leerdam
—	MF	NED	John Nieuwenburg
—	MF	NED	Roel Schirra
—	MF	NED	Mark van Dijk
—	MF	NED	Sjaak Lettinga

No.	Pos.	Nation	Player
—	MF	BRA	Bruno Roma
—	MF	NED	Mart van de Gevel
—	MF	NED	Hilmi Mihçi
—	MF	ANG	Marcio Junqueira
—	MF	NED	Marc Höcher
—	MF	NED	Youssef Chida
—	FW	SUR	Guillano Grot
—	FW	BEL	Jordan Remacle
—	FW	NED	Thomas de Jong
—	FW	NED	Noël Jansen
—	FW	NED	Joost Habraken
—	FW	NED	Pierre Butela
—	FW	NED	Thijs Heus

== Transfers ==
=== In ===
Pos.	Player	Transferred from	Fee	Date	Source

=== Out ===
Pos.	Player	Transferred to	Fee	Date	Source

== Competitions ==
=== Overall record ===
Competition	First match	Last match	Starting round	Final position	Record							
Competition	First match	Last match	Starting round	Final position	Pld	W	D	L	GF	GA	GD	Win %
Eerste Divisie	10 August 2007	18 April 2008	Matchday 1	7th	38	17	7	14	53	52	+1	44.74
Promotion play-offs	22 April 2008	4 May 2008	Round 1	Round 2	4	1	1	2	8	8	+0	25.00
KNVB Cup	25 September 2007		First round	First round	1	0	0	1	0	1	−1	0.00
Total					43	18	8	17	61	61	+0	41.86

Source: Competitions

=== Eerste Divisie ===
==== League table ====
Pos	Team	Pld	W	D	L	GF	GA	GD	Pts	Promotion or qualification
5	MVV	38	16	12	10	66	50	+16	60	Qualification for promotion play-offs Second Round
6	ADO Den Haag (P)	38	16	10	12	58	50	+8	58	Qualification for promotion play-offs First Round
7	Helmond Sport	38	17	7	14	53	52	+1	58	Qualification for promotion play-offs First Round
8	TOP Oss	38	15	10	13	58	61	−3	55	Qualification for promotion play-offs First Round
9	FC Emmen	38	14	11	13	61	74	−13	53	

(P) Promoted

==== Results summary ====
Overall								Home						Away					
Pld	W	D	L	GF	GA	GD	Pts	W	D	L	GF	GA	GD	W	D	L	GF	GA	GD
38	17	7	14	53	52	+1	58	9	5	5	33	22	+11	8	2	9	20	30	−10

==== Results by round ====
Round	1	2	3	4	5	6	7	8	9	10	11	12	13	14	15	16	17	18	19	20	21	22	23	24	25	26	27	28	29	30	31	32	33	34	35	36	37	38
Ground	A	H	H	A	A	H	H	A	H	A	H	A	H	A	A	H	A	H	A	H	A	H	H	A	H	A	H	A	H	A	H	A	A	H	A	H	A	H
Result	D	W	W	W	L	D	L	L	W	L	W	L	D	D	L	W	W	D	W	L	L	L	W	W	W	L	W	L	W	W	L	W	W	D	W	D	L	L
Position	9	3	2	2	2	3	6	8	7	9	6	9	9	11	11	11	10	10	8	8	10	10	9	9	7	8	7	8	7	6	7	6	6	7	6	6	7	7

A = Away; H = Home; W = Win; D = Draw; L = Loss

==== Matches ====
10 August 2007 1	TOP Oss	1–1	Helmond Sport	Oss
				Stadium: Frans Heesen Stadion

19 August 2007 2	Helmond Sport	3–0	Go Ahead Eagles	Helmond
				Stadium: GS Staalwerken Stadion

24 August 2007 3	Helmond Sport	2–1	Dordrecht	Helmond
				Stadium: GS Staalwerken Stadion

27 August 2007 4	Fortuna Sittard	0–1	Helmond Sport	Sittard

31 August 2007 5	RKC Waalwijk	2–1	Helmond Sport	Waalwijk

7 September 2007 6	Helmond Sport	1–1	HFC Haarlem	Helmond
				Stadium: GS Staalwerken Stadion

14 September 2007 7	Helmond Sport	0–1	Den Bosch	Helmond
				Stadium: GS Staalwerken Stadion

17 September 2007 8	ADO Den Haag	2–0	Helmond Sport	The Hague

21 September 2007 9	Helmond Sport	2–1	Telstar	Helmond
				Stadium: GS Staalwerken Stadion

28 September 2007 10	AGOVV	3–1	Helmond Sport	Apeldoorn

5 October 2007 11	Helmond Sport	2–1	Volendam	Helmond
				Stadium: GS Staalwerken Stadion

12 October 2007 12	Emmen	2–1	Helmond Sport	Emmen

19 October 2007 13	Helmond Sport	1–1	Cambuur	Helmond
				Stadium: GS Staalwerken Stadion

26 October 2007 14	FC Zwolle	1–1	Helmond Sport	Zwolle

2 November 2007 15	Eindhoven	3–0	Helmond Sport	Eindhoven

9 November 2007 16	Helmond Sport	2–1	FC Omniworld	Helmond
				Stadium: GS Staalwerken Stadion

16 November 2007 17	BV Veendam	0–1	Helmond Sport	Veendam

23 November 2007 18	Helmond Sport	2–2	MVV Maastricht	Helmond
				Stadium: GS Staalwerken Stadion

30 November 2007 19	RBC Roosendaal	1–3	Helmond Sport	Roosendaal

9 December 2007 20	Helmond Sport	0–1	TOP Oss	Helmond
				Stadium: GS Staalwerken Stadion

14 December 2007 21	Volendam	4–0	Helmond Sport	Roosendaal

21 December 2007 22	Helmond Sport	0–3	Emmen	Helmond
				Stadium: GS Staalwerken Stadion

11 January 2008 23	Helmond Sport	2–0	ADO Den Haag	Helmond
				Stadium: GS Staalwerken Stadion

20 January 2008 24	Den Bosch	0–2	Helmond Sport	's-Hertogenbosch

25 January 2008 25	Helmond Sport	4–1	Eindhoven	Helmond
				Stadium: GS Staalwerken Stadion

1 February 2008 26	FC Omniworld	3–1	Helmond Sport	Almere
				Stadium: Mitsubishi Forkliftstadion

8 February 2008 27	Helmond Sport	5–0	AGOVV	Helmond
				Stadium: GS Staalwerken Stadion

15 February 2008 28	Telstar	2–0	Helmond Sport	Velsen-Zuid
				Stadium: Sportpark Schoonenberg

22 February 2008 29	Helmond Sport	2–0	RBC Roosendaal	Helmond
				Stadium: GS Staalwerken Stadion

29 February 2008 30	Go Ahead Eagles	1–2	Helmond Sport	Deventer
				Stadium: De Adelaarshorst

7 March 2008 31	Helmond Sport	1–2	BV Veendam	Helmond
				Stadium: GS Staalwerken Stadion

10 March 2008 32	MVV Maastricht	0–1	Helmond Sport	Maastricht
				Stadium: De Geusselt

14 March 2008 33	HFC Haarlem	0–1	Helmond Sport	Haarlem
				Stadium: Haarlem Stadion

21 March 2008 34	Helmond Sport	3–3	RKC Waalwijk	Helmond
				Stadium: GS Staalwerken Stadion

28 March 2008 35	Dordrecht	0–1	Helmond Sport	Dordrecht
				Stadium: GN Bouw Stadion

4 April 2008 36	Helmond Sport	1–1	Fortuna Sittard	Helmond
	Remacle 40'		Jacobs 75'	Stadium: GS Staalwerken Stadion; Referee: Dick Jol

11 April 2008 37	Cambuur	5–1	Helmond Sport	Leeuwarden
	Dijkhuizen 9', 59'; Van der Heide 18'; Mboua 44'; Nieuwenburg 90' (o.g.)		Remacle 33'	Stadium: Cambuur Stadion; Referee: Michel Winter

18 April 2008 38	Helmond Sport	0–2	FC Zwolle	Helmond
			Jongsma 79', 81'	Stadium: GS Staalwerken Stadion; Referee: Danny Makkelie

==== Promotion play-offs ====
22 April 2008 Round 1 First leg	TOP Oss	2–2	Helmond Sport	Oss
				Stadium: Frans Heesen Stadion

26 April 2008 Round 1 Second leg	Helmond Sport	3–0 (5–2 agg.)	TOP Oss	Helmond
				Stadium: GS Staalwerken Stadion

1 May 2008 Round 2 First leg	Helmond Sport	2–3	De Graafschap	Helmond
				Stadium: GS Staalwerken Stadion

4 May 2008 Round 2 Second leg	De Graafschap	3–1 (6–3 agg.)	Helmond Sport	Doetinchem
				Stadium: De Vijverberg

=== KNVB Cup ===
25 September 2007 First round	Helmond Sport	0–1	Go Ahead Eagles	Helmond
20:00				Stadium: GS Staalwerken Stadion
