= Leon Hutten =

Dutch footballer (born 1962)

Personal information
- Date of birth: 30 September 1962 (age 64)
- Place of birth: Tilburg, Netherlands
- Position: Rightback

Youth career
- Willem II

Senior career*
Years	Team	Apps	(Gls)
1981–1983	Willem II	3	(0)
1984–1997	RKC	331	(2)
Total		334	(2)

International career
1979	Netherlands U19	1	(0)

Managerial career
- 2009–: Hilvaria
- 2012–2013: Nevelo
- 2014: LONGA
- 2015–2016: Oosterhout
- 2016–2018: Groot Ammers
- 2018–2020: Right-Oh
- * Club domestic league appearances and goals

Leon Hutten (born 30 September 1962) is a Dutch retired football player who played as a defender. He is the all-time record holder of matches played for Dutch club RKC.

== Club career ==
Born in Tilburg, Hutten joined the Willem II youth set-up and made his senior Eredivisie debut for the club on 9 May 1982. He left them for RKC who had just made the step up to professional football and would play in 421 official games in 18 years with the club. In 1988 he was part of the team that won their first ever promotion to the Eredivisie.

== International career ==
Hutten was capped once by the Netherlands national under-19 football team.

== Coaching career ==
After retiring as a player, Hutten coached amateur sides LONGA, SV Nevelo, Hilvaria, VV Oosterhout, VV Groot Ammers and FC Right-Oh and worked at the academies of FC Dordrecht, NAC and RKC. He also was an assistant to manager Martin Jol at RKC.

== Personal life ==
Hutten's brother Corné also played for Willem II and his nephew Lars played for several Eerste Divisie clubs and national youth selections. His father Broer played professionally for NOAD in the early 1960s.

He runs his own football school in different places in North Brabant Province.

== Honours ==
RKC

- Eerste Divisie: 1987–88
