= Sam Bisselink =

Dutch footballer (born 2003)

Personal information
- Date of birth: 2 September 2003 (age 23)
- Place of birth: Arnhem, Netherlands
- Position: Winger

Team information
- Current team: MASV

Youth career
- –2013: Arnhemse Boys
- 2013–2022: De Graafschap

Senior career*
Years	Team	Apps	(Gls)
2022–2024	De Graafschap	16	(1)
2024–2025	Helmond Sport	20	(1)
2026–	MASV		
- * Club domestic league appearances and goals as of 29 August 2025

Sam Bisselink (born 2 September 2003) is a Dutch footballer who plays as a winger.

== Career ==
=== De Graafschap ===
Born in Arnhem, Bisselink started playing football for Arnhemse Boys before joining De Graafschap's youth academy. On 4 November 2022, Bisselink was named in De Graafschap's first-team squad for the first time for an away match against FC Den Bosch, making his debut in the 83rd minute as a substitute for Robin Schouten. A week later, on 11 November, he made his second appearance in a home match against FC Eindhoven, providing an assist in the 80th minute for Hicham Acheffay's 2–1 consolation goal. On 16 December, he again featured as a substitute, replacing Hamza Bouihrouchane in the 80th minute of a home match against Willem II.

Later in the season, Bisselink sustained a serious knee injury while playing for De Graafschap's under-21 team, sidelining him for the remainder of the campaign. In May 2023, he signed his first professional contract with the club, agreeing to a one-year deal with an option for a further season.

On 23 August 2024, Bisselink scored his first senior goal, opening the score in a 2–2 Eerste Divisie draw against Jong Utrecht.

=== Helmond Sport ===
On 2 September 2024, Bisselink joined Eerste Divisie club Helmond Sport. He made his debut for the club on 21 October, starting in a 2–1 win over Roda JC.

After leaving Helmond Sport after one season, Bisselink trained with Vitesse but was not given a contract. He will join Vierde Divisie outfit MASV in summer 2026.

== Career statistics ==
As of match played 28 March 2025

Appearances and goals by club, season and competition
Club	Season	League			KNVB Cup		Other		Total	
Club	Season	Division	Apps	Goals	Apps	Goals	Apps	Goals	Apps	Goals
De Graafschap	2022–23	Eerste Divisie	8	0	2	0	—		10	0
De Graafschap	2023–24	Eerste Divisie	4	0	0	0	0	0	4	0
De Graafschap	2024–25	Eerste Divisie	4	1	0	0	—		4	1
De Graafschap	Total		16	1	2	0	0	0	18	1
Helmond Sport	2024–25	Eerste Divisie	15	0	1	0	—		16	0
Career total			31	1	3	0	0	0	34	1
