= Chido Obi =

Danish footballer (born 2007)

Personal information
- Full name: Chidozie Martin Obi
- Date of birth: 29 November 2007 (age 18)
- Place of birth: Glostrup, Denmark
- Height: 1.88 m (6 ft 2 in)
- Position: Forward

Team information
- Current team: Willem II (on loan from Manchester United)
- Number: 17

Youth career
- –2020: Copenhagen
- 2020–2024: Arsenal
- 2024–2025: Manchester United

Senior career*
Years	Team	Apps	(Gls)
2025–	Manchester United	7	(0)
2026–	→ Willem II (loan)	6	(0)

International career^{‡}
2022–2023	Denmark U16	8	(4)
2023	England U16	2	(0)
2023–2024	Denmark U17	19	(12)
2024	Denmark U18	4	(2)
2025–	Denmark U20	4	(2)
2025–	Denmark U21	2	(0)
Medal record
Men's football
Representing Denmark
UEFA European Under-17 Championship
Bronze medal – third place	2024 Cyprus
- * Club domestic league appearances and goals as of 20:36, 22 November 2026 (UTC) ‡ National team caps and goals as of 23:00, 4 September 2025 (UTC)

Chidozie Martin Obi (born 29 November 2007), commonly known as Chido Obi, is a Danish professional footballer who plays as a forward for Eredivisie club Willem II, on loan from Premier League club Manchester United. He has played youth international football for Denmark up to under-21 level.

Obi joined Manchester United's youth system in 2024, from Arsenal. He made his first-team debut for United in a Premier League game in February 2025. In May 2025, he became the youngest player to start a Premier League game for Manchester United, at the age of 17 years and 156 days.

== Early life ==
Obi was born in Glostrup, a Copenhagen suburb, to Nigerian parents.

== Club career ==
=== Arsenal ===
Obi started his career in Denmark with Copenhagen, often playing up one or two age groups with the 05's and 06's. He eventually moved to England when he was 13 because of his mother's new employment, going on to join the academy of Arsenal. He progressed through the club's youth ranks, establishing himself as a prolific goal-scorer, and was promoted to the under-18 side at the age of fifteen. In his first start for the under-18 side, he scored a hat-trick in a 4–0 win against Southampton on 23 September 2023, earning comparisons to Nigerian international striker Victor Osimhen in Danish media.

The following month Obi made his first appearance for the club's under-21 side, while still fifteen. He continued his meteoric rise at Arsenal in early November 2023, being called up by first-team manager Mikel Arteta to join the senior side for training. Obi made international headlines on 18 November 2023, scoring ten goals as Arsenal beat Liverpool 14–3 at under-16 level. On 27 April 2024, Obi made headlines once again, scoring seven goals for Arsenal in their 9–0 win against Norwich City, taking his tally up to 24 goals in his previous seven games for Arsenal's under-18s. On 29 July 2024, Obi announced his departure from Arsenal on his Instagram account.

=== Manchester United ===
Linked with a move to fellow Premier League club Manchester United in the summer of 2024, the deal was concluded at the end of September. The following month, Obi was named by English newspaper The Guardian as one of the best players born in 2007 worldwide. On his first start, Obi scored a hat-trick in a 6–0 win for the under-18 team over Nottingham Forest.

Obi was named in a senior squad for the first time on 16 February 2025, making his senior debut as a 90th-minute substitute for Casemiro in a 1–0 league defeat at Tottenham Hotspur. Obi was named in the starting line-up for United's game against Brentford on 4 May, the first senior start of his career; at the age of 17 years, 156 days, he became the youngest player to start a Premier League game for United, surpassing Mason Greenwood's previous record of 17 years, 223 days.

On 30 May 2025, Obi scored his first two senior goals for United in a 3–1 friendly win against Hong Kong.

==== Willem II ====
Obi joined Dutch Eredivisie club Willem II on a season-long loan on 2 September 2026.

== International career ==
Eligible to represent Denmark, Nigeria or England at international level, Obi made five appearances in late 2022 for Denmark's under-16 team, before switching allegiance to England. He represented England twice at under-16 level in February 2023, against Cyprus and Scotland. However, in April of the same year he returned to the Danish under-16 team, scoring twice in three appearances. His prolific goal-scoring form earned him a call-up to the Denmark under-17 team, and he started Denmark's 2024 UEFA European Under-17 Championship qualification campaign with two goals in his first three games.

Obi made his debut for the Denmark under-20 team during the 2025 Maurice Revello Tournament. He would score a 96th-minute goal vs Congo to secure a 2–0 win for his country, in their second game of the group stage. He would score his second goal of the tournament in a 3–0 win over Japan before eventually getting knocked out to Saudi Arabia in the semi-finals.

== Career statistics ==
As of match played 22 November 2026

Appearances and goals by club, season and competition
Club	Season	League			National cup (Note: Includes FA Cup)		League cup		Europe		Other		Total	
Club	Season	Division	Apps	Goals	Apps	Goals	Apps	Goals	Apps	Goals	Apps	Goals	Apps	Goals
Manchester United	2024–25	Premier League	7	0	1	0	0	0	0	0	—		8	0
Manchester United	2025–26	Premier League	0	0	0	0	0	0	—		—		0	0
Manchester United	2026–27	Premier League	0	0	—		—		—		—		0	0
Manchester United	Total		7	0	1	0	0	0	0	0	—		8	0
Manchester United U21	2025–26	—			—		—		—		3 (Note: Appearances in EFL Trophy)	1	3	1
Willem II (loan)	2026–27	Eredivisie	6	0	1	0	—		—		—		7	0
Career total			13	0	2	0	0	0	0	0	3	1	18	1

== Honours ==
Individual

- UEFA European Under-17 Championship Team of the Tournament: 2024
