= Sem Dekkers =

Dutch footballer (born 2004)

Personal information
- Date of birth: 28 May 2004 (age 22)
- Place of birth: Heiloo, Netherlands
- Height: 1.78 m (5 ft 10 in)
- Position: Left back

Team information
- Current team: Helmond Sport
- Number: 20

Youth career
- –2014: HSV Heiloo
- 2014–2022: AZ Alkmaar

Senior career*
Years	Team	Apps	(Gls)
2022–2026	Jong AZ	56	(1)
2025–2026	AZ	0	(0)
2025	→ Helmond Sport (loan)	7	(0)
2026–	Helmond Sport	15	(1)

International career^{‡}
2019	Netherlands U15	3	(0)
2022	Netherlands U18	5	(0)
2022	Netherlands U19	1	(0)
- * Club domestic league appearances and goals as of 28 April 2026 ‡ National team caps and goals as of 16:59, 04 October 2022

Sem Dekkers (born 28 May 2004) is a Dutch professional footballer who plays as a left-back for Eerste Divisie club Helmond Sport. He has featured for the Netherlands national under-19 team.

== Club career ==
Dekkers was with his hometown club HSV Heiloo before switching to the AZ Alkmaar football academy in 2014, at the same time as his brother Quinten Dekkers also did. He signed a two-year contract with AZ in June 2021, taking him through to the summer of 2023, with the option of an extra season. He predominantly plays as a right full-back. Sem Dekkers made his debut for Jong AZ appearing as a substitute on 8 August 2022 in a 2–0 home win against MVV Maastricht in the Eerste Divisie. Later that season, he scored his first goal for the club with the second in a 3–1 away win against TOP Oss in the Eerste Divisie on 16 January 2023.

On 4 February 2025, Dekkers was loaned by Helmond Sport for the remainder of the season, with an option for the move to become permanent. He made his debut for the club as a second-half substitute in 1–0 home defeat against FC Dordrecht in the Esste Divisie on the 8 February 2025. He made his first league start the following week against Excelsior Rotterdam in a 1–1 draw on 16 February 2025.

On 29 January 2026, Dekkers returned to Helmond Sport on a permanent basis and signed a two-and-a-half-year contract with the club.

== International career ==
In 2022, Dekkers played for the Netherlands U19 team. He started in a 2–0 home win against Moldova U19 on 21 September 2022.

== Personal life ==
Sem Dekkers is the younger brother of fellow footballer and former Jong AZ defender Quinten Dekkers. Dekkers is of Indonesian descent through his mother.
