= Redouane Halhal =

Moroccan footballer (born 2003)

- Halhal with Morocco in 2026

Personal information
- Date of birth: 5 March 2003 (age 23)
- Place of birth: Montpellier, France
- Height: 1.88 m (6 ft 2 in)
- Position: Centre-back

Team information
- Current team: Venezia

Youth career
- 2012–2015: AS Atlas Paillade
- 2015–2021: Montpellier

Senior career*
Years	Team	Apps	(Gls)
2021–2023	Montpellier	0	(0)
2021–2023	Montpellier B	31	(0)
2023–2024	Atlético Madrid B	2	(0)
2024–2026	Mechelen	33	(1)
2024–2025	→ Helmond Sport (loan)	32	(1)
2026–	Venezia	1	(0)

International career^{‡}
2022	Morocco U20	3	(0)
2023	Morocco U23	2	(0)
2026–	Morocco	5	(0)
- * Club domestic league appearances and goals as of 31 May 2026 ‡ National team caps and goals as of 4 July 2026

Redouane Halhal (Arabic: رضوان حلحل; born 5 March 2003) is a footballer who plays as a centre-back for Serie A club Venezia. Born in France, he represents the Morocco national team.

== Club career ==
On 15 August 2024, Halhal signed with Mechelen in Belgium and was loaned to Helmond Sport in the Netherlands for the 2024–25 season. He made his Mechelen debut on 1 August 2025.

On 1 August 2026, Halhal joined Serie A side Venezia, signing a contract until 2030. He made his debut for Venezia in a game against AC Milan, scoring an own goal.

== International career ==
Halhal is a Morocco youth international. He played for the Morocco national under-20 football team at the 2023 U-23 Africa Cup of Nations.

On 26 May 2026, Halhal was selected in the 26-man squad for the 2026 FIFA World Cup.

== Style of play ==
Halhal mainly operates as a defender. Al-Araby Al-Jadeed stated in 2024 that he "possesses remarkable physical strength".

== Personal life ==
Halhal was born in 2003 in France. He is a native of Montpellier, France.
