= Juanito Sequeira =

Dutch footballer

Personal information
- Date of birth: 14 March 1982 (age 44)
- Place of birth: Rotterdam, Netherlands
- Height: 1.79 m (5 ft 10 1/2 in)
- Position: Midfielder

Senior career*
Years	Team	Apps	(Gls)
2003–2006	Excelsior	67	(3)
2006–2011	FC Dordrecht	158	(7)
2011–2015	Helmond Sport	86	(3)
2016–2017	Achilles '29	4	(0)
2017–2018	ASWH		
2019–	VOC		
- * Club domestic league appearances and goals as of 26 November 2022

Juanito Sequeira (born 14 March 1982) is a Dutch former professional footballer who plays as a midfielder. Sequeira has formerly played for Excelsior, FC Dordrecht, Helmond Sport, and ASWH.
