= Marc Koot =

Dutch footballer (born 1990)

Personal information
- Date of birth: 23 November 1990 (age 35)
- Place of birth: Uden, Netherlands
- Height: 1.83 m (6 ft 0 in)
- Position: Striker

Youth career
- RKSV Volkel
- UDI '19

Senior career*
Years	Team	Apps	(Gls)
2011–2013	FC Oss	49	(9)
2013–2016	Helmond Sport	54	(5)
- * Club domestic league appearances and goals as of 6 June 2016

Marc Koot (born 23 November 1990 in Uden) is a Dutch professional footballer who last played as a striker for Helmond Sport in the Dutch Eerste Divisie He formerly played for FC Oss.
