= Quinten Dekkers =

Dutch footballer (born 2001)

Personal information
- Date of birth: 4 January 2001 (age 25)
- Place of birth: Amsterdam, Netherlands
- Height: 1.79 m (5 ft 10 in)
- Position: Right-back

Youth career
- -2014: HSV Heiloo
- 2014-2019: AZ

Senior career*
Years	Team	Apps	(Gls)
2019–2022	Jong AZ	7	(0)
2022–2023	Koninklijke HFC	16	(1)

International career
2017	Netherlands U16	3	(0)
- * Club domestic league appearances and goals as of 29 May 2022

Quinten Dekkers (born 4 January 2001) is a Dutch footballer who most recently played as a right-back for Koninklijke HFC.

== Club career ==
On 26 April 2020, Dekkers signed his first professional contract with Jong AZ. He made his professional debut with Jong AZ in a 6–1 Eerste Divisie loss to NAC on 29 August 2020.

== International career ==
Born in the Netherlands, Dekkers grew up in Heiloo and is of Indonesian descent through his mother. He is a former youth international for the Netherlands.
