= Lars Hutten =

Dutch footballer (born 1990)

Personal information
- Date of birth: 18 March 1990 (age 36)
- Place of birth: Tilburg, Netherlands
- Height: 1.81 m (5 ft 11 in)
- Position: Winger

Youth career
- JPS
- Willem II
- 2002–2010: PSV

Senior career*
Years	Team	Apps	(Gls)
2010–2012	Willem II	19	(0)
2012	→ Veendam (loan)	17	(2)
2012–2013	Veendam	26	(12)
2013–2015	Excelsior	35	(12)
2014–2015	→ Helmond Sport (loan)	22	(2)
2015–2016	Fortuna Sittard	36	(11)
2016–2017	SV Rödinghausen	19	(5)
2017–2019	Fortuna Sittard	45	(6)
2019–2021	TOP Oss	25	(2)
2021–2023	Kozakken Boys	41	(5)
Total		285	(57)

International career
2004–2005	Netherlands U15	4	(0)
2005–2006	Netherlands U16	6	(0)
2008–2009	Netherlands U19	3	(0)
2010	Netherlands U20	1	(0)
- * Club domestic league appearances and goals

Lars Hutten (born 18 March 1990) is a Dutch retired footballer who played as a winger.

In his career, he featured for various clubs in the Netherlands, including a tenure at Germany's SV Rödinghausen for one season. Throughout these stints, he accumulated a total of 310 competitive appearances and scored 67 goals.

Hutten represented the Netherlands in youth football, featuring prominently in the under-16, under-19, and under-20 teams. In total, he earned 14 caps across these national youth sides.

== Club career ==
=== Early career ===
Hutten played as a youth for JPS in Tilburg-Noord, until joining local Eredivisie side Willem II at a young age. He was later signed by PSV at the age of 12, where he progressed through the youth system. In the 2008–09 and 2009–10 seasons, Hutten played in Jong PSV, the reserve team. On 23 September 2008, Hutten started in a KNVB Cup matchup between Jong PSV and PSV. The reserves team lost the game 3–0.

=== Willem II ===
In the summer of 2010, Hutten returned to his hometown to play for his former club, Willem II. The then newly appointed head coach Gert Heerkes had a spot left in the first team roster. In the preparation for the new season he made such a strong impression which meant that he made his debut in the Eredivisie in the first match of the 2010–11 season on 7 August 2010 against Heracles Almelo. Hutten played instead of the injured Paweł Wojciechowski and was preferred over Rowin van Zaanen.

On 20 July 2011, during a friendly against Fortuna Sittard, Hutten broke his metatarsal bone, which meant he was sidelined for ten weeks.

=== Veendam ===
After being loaned out to SC Veendam in 2012, he signed a permanent deal with the club at the expiration of his loan deal. At the end of March 2013, Veendam went bankrupt and Hutten became a free agent as a result. He trained at FC Groningen in early April 2013 together with three other former Veendam players.

=== Excelsior ===
On 11 May 2013, it was announced that Hutten was joining Excelsior on a two-year contract. As part of that team, Hutten secured promotion to the Eredivisie in the 2013–14 season. He was loaned out to Helmond Sport for the 2014–15 season.

=== Fortuna Sittard and Rödinghausen ===
Hutten became a free agent in July 2015 and started training at Fortuna Sittard. There, he impressed and signed a contract a one-year contract in August 2015. From 2016 he played for German Regionalliga West club SV Rödinghausen, before returning to Fortuna Sittard in September 2017.

=== TOP Oss ===
On 25 June 2019, TOP Oss announced the signing of Hutten on a two-year contract.

=== Kozakken Boys ===
On 18 February 2021, it was announced that Hutten would join Kozakken Boys in the Tweede Divisie for the 2021–22 season. He made his debut on 21 August as a starter in a 1–0 away win over Quick Boys. In the following game, on 28 August, Hutten scored his first goal for the club in a 1–1 home draw against GVVV.

Hutten officially retired from playing on 13 January 2023, explaining that the challenges of juggling a football career alongside his work as a real estate agent, ongoing studies, and family responsibilities were becoming too demanding.

== International career ==
Hutten has appeared for both the Netherlands under-19 team and under-20 team. Before, he was also a part of the under-16 team. He gained 14 total caps for various Netherlands national youth teams.

== Personal life ==
Hutten's father Corné also played for Willem II and his uncle Leon is RKC Waalwijk's recordholder in games played. Lars lives in Kaatsheuvel and works as a real estate agent.
