= Davy Brouwers =

Belgian footballer

Personal information
- Full name: Davy Brouwers
- Date of birth: 3 February 1988 (age 38)
- Place of birth: Waterschei, Belgium
- Height: 1.77 m (5 ft 9 1/2 in)
- Positions: Right winger; attacking midfielder

Team information
- Current team: Patro Eisden
- Number: 19

Youth career
- Patro Eisden
- Beringen-Heusden-Zolder

Senior career*
Years	Team	Apps	(Gls)
2004–2005	Patro Eisden	12	(0)
2005–2006	Beringen-Heusden-Zolder	7	(0)
2007–2012	Lommel United	128	(41)
2012–2014	Helmond Sport	67	(21)
2014–2015	MVV Maastricht	35	(15)
2015–2018	Roeselare	45	(15)
2018–2020	Thes Sport	20	(1)
2019–2020	→ Patro Eisden (loan)	23	(8)
2020–	Thes Sport	1	(0)
- * Club domestic league appearances and goals as of 19:15, 4 February 2021 (UTC)

Davy Brouwers (born 3 February 1988) is a Belgian footballer who currently plays for Patro Eisden in the Belgian First Amateur Division as a right winger.

== Statistics ==
Season	Club	Country	League	Apps	Goals
2004/05	Patro Maasmechelen	Belgium	Belgian Second Division	12	0
2005/06	Beringen-Heusden-Zolder	Belgium	Belgian Second Division	7	0
2007/08	Lommel United	Belgium	Belgian Second Division	15	2
2008/09	Lommel United	Belgium	Belgian Second Division	15	8
2009/10	Lommel United	Belgium	Belgian Second Division	35	13
2010/11	Lommel United	Belgium	Belgian Second Division	21	5
2011/12	Lommel United	Belgium	Belgian Second Division	32	13
2012/13	Helmond Sport	Netherlands	Eerste Divisie	31	7
2013/14	Helmond Sport	Netherlands	Eerste Divisie	36	14
2014/15	MVV Maastricht	Netherlands	Eerste Divisie	35	15
2015/16	Roeselare	Belgium	Belgian Second Division	0	0
			Career Total	239	77
