= Kevin van Essen =

Dutch footballer

Personal information
- Full name: Kevin van Essen
- Date of birth: 18 August 1989 (age 37)
- Place of birth: Naarden, Netherlands
- Height: 1.75 m (5 ft 9 in)
- Position: Midfielder

Youth career
- SV Almere
- FC Omniworld

Senior career*
Years	Team	Apps	(Gls)
2007–2010	FC Omniworld	8	(0)
2010–2012	Argon	53	(7)
2012–2016	Telstar	107	(10)
- * Club domestic league appearances and goals as of 19 July 2016

Kevin van Essen (born 18 August 1989 in Naarden) is a Dutch professional footballer who last played as a midfielder for Telstar in the Dutch Eerste Divisie.

== Club career ==
Van Essen played for FC Omniworld and amateur side Argon before joining Eerste Divisie outfit Telstar in 2012.

== Anti-doping rule violation ==
In July 2015 it was announced that van Essen had tested positive for the diuretic Furosemide in a control in May. He received a two-year suspension in December 2015 and considered a return to a former job in construction.

After his ban he returned to play football with amateur side NSC Nijkerk.
