= Charles Kazlauskas =

American soccer player and coach

Personal information
- Date of birth: November 12, 1982 (age 43)
- Place of birth: Milwaukee, United States
- Position: Right-back

Team information
- Current team: VV De Bataven (manager); Helmond Sport (U15 manager)

Youth career
- Milwaukee Kickers

Senior career*
Years	Team	Apps	(Gls)
2001–2005	NEC	11	(0)
2003–2004	→ Fortuna Sittard (loan)	12	(1)
2005–2009	TOP Oss	124	(11)
2009–2015	Helmond Sport	197	(17)
2015–2016	De Treffers	18	(3)
2016–2017	JVC Cuijk	24	(1)
Total		386	(33)

International career
2001	United States U20	1	(0)

Managerial career
- 2013–2015: Spero Elst (assistant)
- 2017–2018: Vitesse U17 (assistant)
- 2018–2019: VV Trekvogels
- 2019–2021: Blauw Wit
- 2021–2022: Eendracht '30
- 2022–: Helmond Sport (U15)
- 2022–: VV De Bataven
- * Club domestic league appearances and goals

Charles Kazlauskas (born November 12, 1982) is an American former professional soccer player who is the head coach of Dutch Eerste Klasse club VV De Bataven and also head coach of Helmond Sport's U15 team.

== Career ==
Born in Milwaukee, Kazlauskas signed for Dutch club NEC in 2001, making his senior debut for them on August 14, 2001, in the KNVB Cup. He spent the 2003–04 season on loan at Fortuna Sittard, and signed permanently for TOP Oss in 2005. He made his 100th appearance for Oss in February 2008. Kazlauskas was offered a new contract by Oss in April 2009, but he left the club later that summer, signing for Helmond Sport. He retired in 2017 as part of JVC Cuijk.
