= Alexander Mols =

Dutch football player

Personal information
- Full name: Alexander Mols
- Date of birth: 13 August 1991 (age 35)
- Place of birth: Veghel, Netherlands
- Height: 1.87 m (6 ft 2 in)
- Position: Winger

Youth career
- –2008: Blauw Geel '38
- 2008–2009: Willem II
- 2009–2010: Blauw Geel '38

Senior career*
Years	Team	Apps	(Gls)
2009–2013	Blauw Geel '38		
2013–2015	Den Bosch	42	(12)
2016–2018	Blauw Geel '38	28	(9)
- * Club domestic league appearances and goals

Alexander Mols (born 13 August 1991) is a Dutch former professional footballer who played as a winger.

== Football career ==
Born in Veghel, Mols started his career with Blauw Geel '38. After a season, where he scored 20 goals in the Hoofdklasse for the club, he moved to FC Den Bosch on 28 May 2013. He made his professional debut on 4 August 2013 in a league match against Willem II (2–2), in which he came on as a substitute for Istvan Bakx.

In February 2015, Mols tore the anterior cruciate ligament on his right knee, sidelining him for a year due to the severity of the injury. His contract with Den Bosch expired on 30 June 2015, in the midst of his rehabilition. In February 2016, he practiced some time with FC Oss, before finally returning to his childhood club Blauw Geel '38 in May 2016. In May 2018, after playing regularly for two seasons at the club, he announced his retirement from football, due to lacking motivation, at age 26.
