= Jonas Scholz =

German footballer (born 1999)

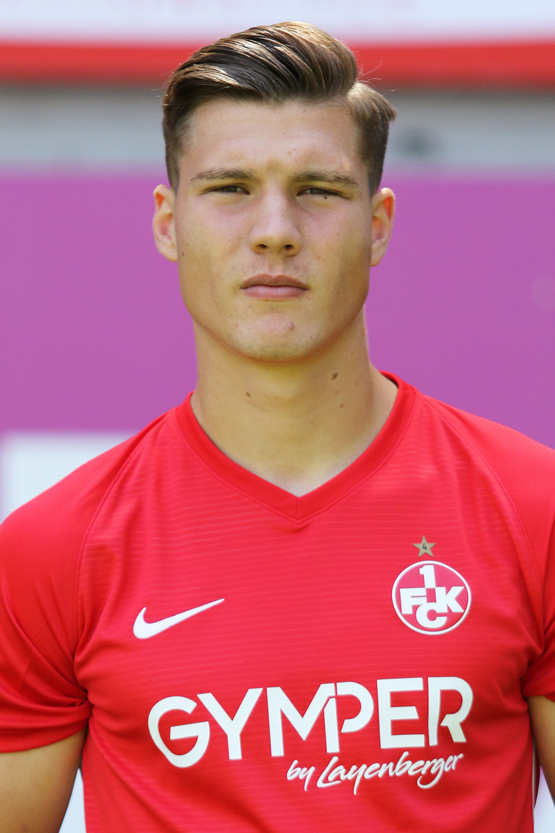
- Scholz with 1. FC Kaiserslautern in July 2019

Personal information
- Date of birth: 24 January 1999 (age 27)
- Place of birth: Roth, Germany
- Height: 1.89 m (6 ft 2 in)
- Position: Centre-back

Team information
- Current team: FC Ingolstadt
- Number: 15

Youth career
- TV 21 Büchenbach
- –2013: ASV Neumarkt
- 2013–2018: 1. FC Nürnberg

Senior career*
Years	Team	Apps	(Gls)
2018–2021	1. FC Kaiserslautern II	52	(0)
2018–2021	1. FC Kaiserslautern	5	(0)
2021–2022	FC Homburg	46	(1)
2022–2024	Fortuna Köln	61	(6)
2024–2025	Helmond Sport	34	(6)
2025–	FC Ingolstadt	34	(3)
- * Club domestic league appearances and goals as of 29 May 2026

Jonas Scholz (born 24 January 1999) is a German professional footballer who plays as a centre-back for 3. Liga club FC Ingolstadt.

== Career ==
Scholz was born on 24 January 1999 in Roth, Bavaria, Germany. He played youth football for TV 21 Büchenbach and ASV Neumarkt before joining 1. FC Nürnberg's academy in 2013. In 2018, he moved to 1. FC Kaiserslautern's reserve team competing in the Oberliga.

Scholz made his professional debut for Kaiserslautern's first team in the 3. Liga on 20 July 2019, starting against SpVgg Unterhaching before being substituted out in the 78th minute for Gino Fechner, with the match finishing as a 1–1 home draw.

In January 2021, Scholz signed a one-and-a-half-year contract with Regionalliga Südwest club FC 08 Homburg. He grew into a starter for the club. In June 2022, it was announced that he had refused to sign a contract extension with Homburg, instead signing with Regionalliga West club Fortuna Köln.

On 3 June 2024, Scholz signed a two-year contract with an option for an additional year with Dutch Eerste Divisie club Helmond Sport. He made his debut in the opening fixture of the season, starting in a 1–1 home draw against Jong Utrecht.

On 24 July 2025, Scholz returned to Germany and signed with FC Ingolstadt.
