= Colin van Gool =

Dutch footballer (born 1995)

Personal information
- Date of birth: 10 February 1995 (age 31)
- Place of birth: Nuenen, Netherlands
- Position: Midfielder

Youth career
- –2009: Nuenen
- 2009–2014: Helmond Sport

Senior career*
Years	Team	Apps	(Gls)
2014	VVV	1	(0)
2014-2016	Helmond Sport	3	(0)
2016-2017	Canterbury United	17	(0)
2017	Christchurch United		
2018-2020	Nuenen		
2020-2023	Eindhoven AV		
- * Club domestic league appearances and goals

Colin van Gool (born 10 February 1995 in the Netherlands) is a Dutch footballer who most recently played for FC Eindhoven AV.

== Career ==
Van Gool started his senior career with Helmond Sport in the Dutch Eerste Divisie, where he made three appearances and scored zero goals. After that, he played for VVV-Venlo, in New Zealand for Canterbury United and Christchurch United, for RKSV Nuenen, and FC Eindhoven AV, where he played last.
