= Dave Nieskens =

Dutch footballer

Personal information
- Full name: Dave Theodora Stephanus Nieskens
- Date of birth: 29 April 1994 (age 32)
- Place of birth: Sittard, Netherlands
- Height: 1.82 m (6 ft 0 in)
- Position: Centre-back

Team information
- Current team: RKSV Minor
- Number: 14

Youth career
- EVV
- VVV

Senior career*
Years	Team	Apps	(Gls)
2013–2015	Helmond Sport	35	(4)
2014	→ Visé (loan)	6	(0)
2016	Bilzerse-Waltwilder	10	(1)
2016–2017	Houtvenne		
2017	Barrow	8	(1)
2018	Braintree Town	8	(0)
2019	KFC Heur-Tongeren		
2019–2020	SC Union Nettetal	14	(0)
2020–	RKSV Minor		
- * Club domestic league appearances and goals as of 00:34, 1 November 2019 (UTC)

Dave Theodora Stephanus Nieskens (born 29 April 1994) is a Dutch footballer who plays as a centre-back for RKSV Minor.

== Career ==
Nieskens played for EVV and joined the joint academy at VVV and Helmond Sport, joining the latter's senior squad in June 2013. Nieskens played 35 times in the Eerste Divisie across two seasons, scoring four goals, and also had a loan spell at Visé. He then moved to Belgium again where he played for Bilzerse-Waltwilder and Houtvenne before joining Barrow for the 2017–18 season. After eight appearances and one goal, Nieskens left the club in December 2017 by mutual consent due to a knee injury. Nieskens joined Braintree Town in August 2018. Nieskens joined KFC Heur-Tongeren in January 2019.
