= RWDM =

RWDM refers to several Belgian football clubs:

- RWD Molenbeek (1909) (matricule 47)
- RWDM Brussels FC (matricule 1936)
- RWDM Brussels, formerly also known as RWDM or RWD Molenbeek (matricule 5479)
