= Kevin Gomez-Nieto =

Dutch footballer (born 1994)

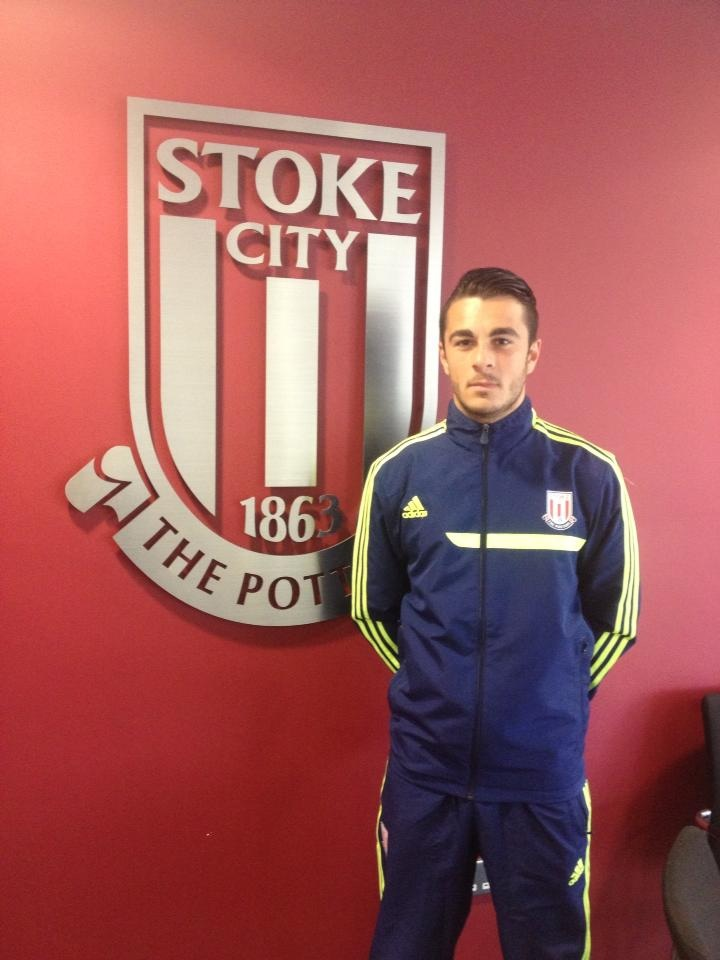
- Gomez-Nieto With Stoke City in 2013

Personal information
- Full name: Kevin Gomez-Nieto
- Date of birth: 11 January 1994 (age 32)
- Place of birth: Zoetermeer, Netherlands
- Height: 1.85 m (6 ft 1 in)
- Position: Right-back

Team information
- Current team: Rijnvogels
- Number: 2

Youth career
- 2001–2003: DSO
- 2003–2013: Feyenoord

Senior career*
Years	Team	Apps	(Gls)
2013–2014	Stoke City	0	(0)
2014–2015	Helmond Sport	20	(1)
2015–2019	Scheveningen	90	(13)
2019–2021	Quick Boys	23	(0)
2021–2024	Scheveningen	57	(5)
2024–	Rijnvogels	22	(1)
- * Club domestic league appearances and goals as of 02:57, 4 August 2025 (UTC)

Kevin Gomez-Nieto (born 11 January 1994) is a Dutch footballer who plays as a right-back for Rijnvogels.

== Career ==
Gomez-Nieto began his career at the Feyenoord academy before he was released in 2013.

After leaving Feyenoord, Gomez-Nieto joined English Premier League side Stoke City in the summer of 2013 following a successful trial. He played ten games for Stoke's under-21 side in the 2013–14 season and upon the conclusion of the campaign he was not offered a contract and returned to the Netherlands.

He went on trial at Eerste Divisie side Helmond Sport and a successful trial at Helmond earned him a contract with the club. Soon after, Gomez-Nieto made his professional debut on 29 August 2014 in a 4–1 defeat against NEC.

Gomez-Nieto player for SVV Scheveningen between 2015 and 2019 before moving to Quick Boys. In April 2021, he returned to Scheveningen and he later joined Rijnvogels.

== Personal life ==
Gomez-Nieto has mixed Dutch and Spanish heritage. He played youth football for hometown club DSO and works in recruitment.
