= Onesime Zimuangana =

Dutch footballer (born 2006)

Personal information
- Date of birth: 5 March 2006 (age 20)
- Place of birth: Helmond, Netherlands
- Height: 5 ft 9 in (1.76 m)
- Position: Winger

Team information
- Current team: MVV Maastricht
- Number: 29

Youth career
- 2021–2024: PSV

Senior career*
Years	Team	Apps	(Gls)
2023–2024	Jong PSV	3	(0)
2024–2026	Helmond Sport	17	(1)
2026–	MVV Maastricht	7	(0)

International career^{‡}
2021	Netherlands U16	1	(0)
2023	Netherlands U17	2	(0)
- * Club domestic league appearances and goals as of 3 October 2026 ‡ National team caps and goals as of 16 June 2024

Onesime Zimuangana (born 5 March 2006) is a Dutch footballer who plays for Eerste Divisie club MVV Maastricht.

== Career ==
Zimuangana was born in Helmond, before joining PSV in 2021 and playing for their youth teams.

Zimuangana made his professional debut for Jong PSV on 18 September 2023, coming on as a 74th-minute subsititue in a 4–0 loss to FC Groningen. Zimuangana made his first start for Jong PSV on 22 September 2023, playing 65 minutes in a 0–0 draw vs. VVV-Venlo. He went on to make 3 total appearances for Jong PSV.

On 5 June 2024, Helmond Sport announced the signing of Zimuangana, who returned to his hometown.

On 14 August 2026, Zimuangana signed a two-year contract with MVV Maastricht.
