= Anthony van den Hurk =

Curaçaoan footballer (born 1993)

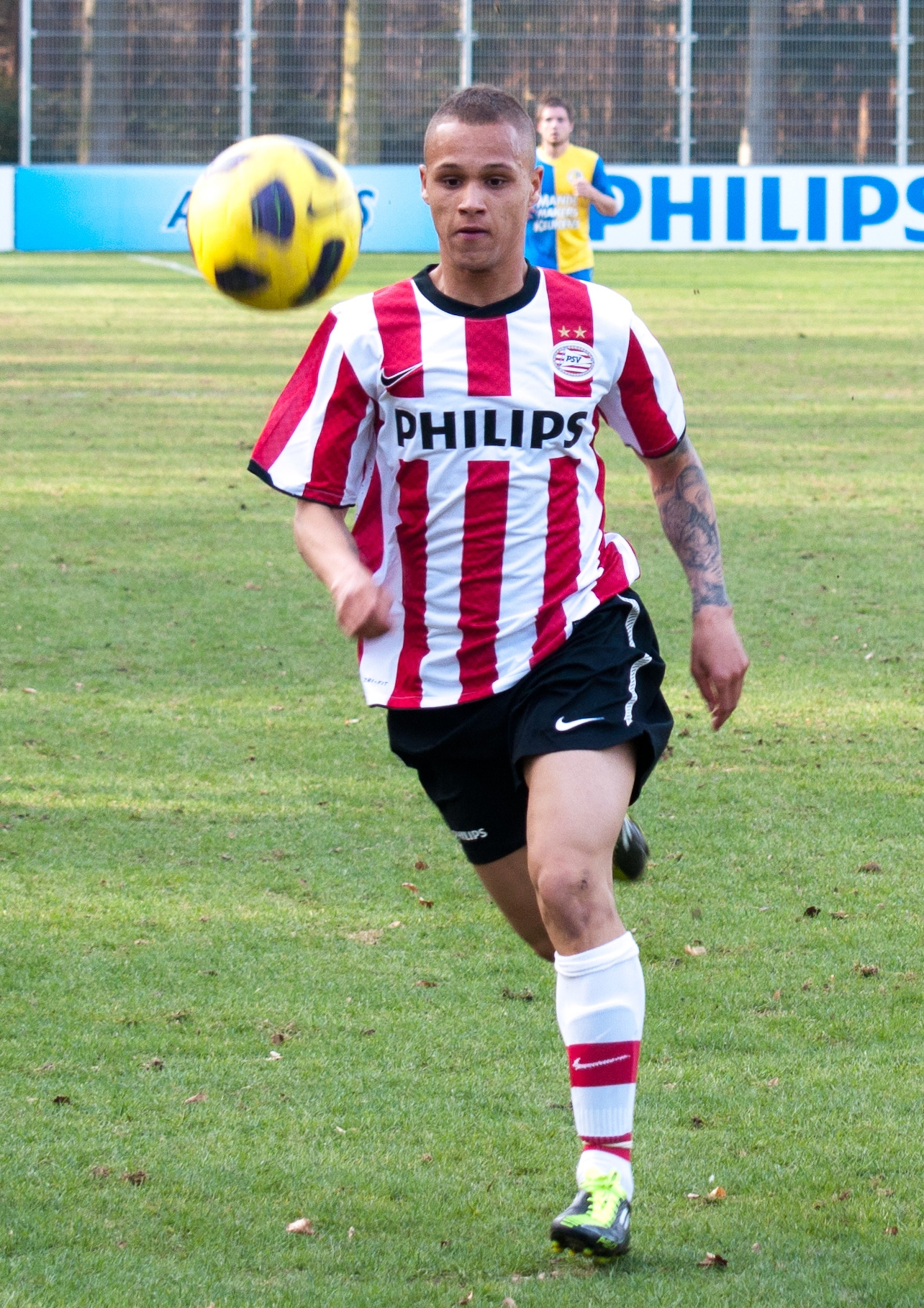
- Van den Hurk with PSV Eindhoven in 2011

Personal information
- Full name: Anthony Edsel Johannes van den Hurk
- Date of birth: 19 January 1993 (age 33)
- Place of birth: Veghel, Netherlands
- Height: 1.80 m (5 ft 11 in)
- Position: Forward

Team information
- Current team: Roda JC
- Number: 9

Youth career
- Blauw Geel '38
- –2006: Den Bosch
- 2006–2012: PSV

Senior career*
Years	Team	Apps	(Gls)
2012–2013	Den Bosch	3	(0)
2013–2016	Eindhoven	73	(25)
2016–2018	De Graafschap	49	(19)
2018–2020	MVV	63	(32)
2020–2022	Helsingborg	68	(32)
2022–2023	Rizespor	12	(2)
2023	→ Górnik Zabrze (loan)	6	(1)
2023–2025	Helmond Sport	57	(19)
2025–	Roda JC	48	(23)

International career
2007–2008	Netherlands U15	3	(2)
2008–2009	Netherlands U16	5	(2)
2009–2010	Netherlands U17	4	(2)
2021–2022	Curaçao	7	(2)
- * Club domestic league appearances and goals as of 20 November 2026

Anthony Edsel Johannes van den Hurk (born 19 January 1993) is a Dutch-born Curaçaoan professional footballer who plays as a forward for Eerste Divisie club Roda JC.

He formerly played for Den Bosch, FC Eindhoven, De Graafschap, MVV Maastricht, Helsingborgs IF, Çaykur Rizespor, Górnik Zabrze and Helmond Sport. Born in the Netherlands, he represented the Curaçao national football team.

== Club career ==
Born in Veghel, van den Hurk played youth football for local amateur side Blauw Geel '38, before being picked up by professional club Den Bosch. He would then leave them for the PSV academy. He would later return to Den Bosch, then moved to Eindhoven who sold him to De Graafschap after a prolific Eerste Divisie season.

In 2018, van den Hurk joined MVV after losing his place in the De Graafschap starting line-up to Fabian Serrarens. After a slow start due to the COVID-19 pandemic, he had a successful stint in Sweden, finally heading Helsingborg back to the Allsvenskan in 2021. After losing his place again halfway the 2022 Swedish season, he went to Turkey to play for second-tier Rizespor. In March 2023, he was loaned to Polish club Górnik Zabrze for whom he immediately scored on his debut.

On 31 August 2023, van den Hurk signed a two-year contract with Helmond Sport.

On 14 May 2025, van den Hurk agreed to join Roda JC Kerkrade for the 2025–26 season.

== International career ==
Van den Hurk played 4 games for the Netherlands national under-17 football team and 5 for the U16s before switching alliance to Curaçao.

He debuted for the Curaçao national team in a 5–0 2022 FIFA World Cup qualification win over Saint Vincent and the Grenadines on 25 March 2021, scoring the second goal in the 17th minute.

On 6 June 2022, Van de Hurk scored his second international goal in a win against Honduras.

== International goals ==
No.	Date	Venue	Opponent	Score	Result	Competition
1.	25 March 2021	Ergilio Hato Stadium, Willemstad, Curaçao	Saint Vincent and the Grenadines	2–0	5–0	2022 FIFA World Cup qualification
2.	6 June 2022	Estadio Olímpico Metropolitano, San Pedro Sula, Honduras	Honduras	2–0	2–1	2022–23 CONCACAF Nations League A
