= Amin Doudah =

Belgian footballer (born 2002)

Personal information
- Full name: Mohammed Amin Doudah
- Date of birth: 10 September 2002 (age 24)
- Place of birth: Wilrijk, Belgium
- Height: 1.89 m (6 ft 2 in)
- Position: Midfielder

Team information
- Current team: GS Ilioupolis
- Number: 47

Youth career
- –2013: Anderlecht
- 2013–2021: PSV

Senior career*
Years	Team	Apps	(Gls)
2020–2023	Jong PSV	55	(1)
2023–2024	Mechelen	0	(0)
2023–2024	→ Helmond Sport (loan)	3	(0)
2024–2025	Helmond Sport	15	(2)
2025–	GS Ilioupolis	3	(0)

International career
2017	Belgium U15	2	(0)
- * Club domestic league appearances and goals as of 10 November 2025

Mohammed Amin Doudah (born 10 September 2002) is a Belgian professional footballer who plays as a midfielder for Super League Greece 2 club GS Ilioupolis.

== Club career ==
On 26 July 2023, Doudah signed with Mechelen and was immediately loaned out to Helmond Sport in Eerste Divisie.

On 3 August 2024, Doudah returned to Helmond Sport on a permanent basis with a one-season contract.
