= Justin Ogenia =

Curaçaoan footballer

Personal information
- Date of birth: 5 February 1999 (age 27)
- Place of birth: Helmond, Netherlands
- Height: 1.80 m (5 ft 11 in)
- Position: Right-back

Youth career
- 2011: Mierlo-Hout
- 2011–2019: Willem II

Senior career*
| Years | Team | Apps | (Gls) |
| 2019–2020 | Willem II | 1 | (0) |
| 2020 | → Eindhoven (loan) | 9 | (1) |
| 2020–2024 | Eindhoven | 68 | (0) |
| 2024–2026 | Helmond Sport | 55 | (3) |

International career
| 2016 | Curaçao U20 | 3 | (0) |
| 2022– | Curaçao | 8 | (0) |
- * Club domestic league appearances and goals as of 24 April 2026

Justin Ogenia (born 5 February 1999) is a professional footballer who plays as a right-back. Born in mainland Netherlands, he plays for the Curaçao national team.

== Professional career ==
=== Willem II ===
On 2 March 2019, Ogenia signed a professional contract with Willem II. Ogenia made his professional debut with Willem II in a 1-0 Eredivisie loss to Feyenoord on 1 September 2019.

==== Loan to FC Eindhoven ====
In the 2020 winter transfer window, Ogenia was loaned out to Eerste Divisie side FC Eindhoven.

=== FC Eindhoven ===
In October 2020, Ogenia permanently joined FC Eindhoven on a one-year contract, with a club option for a second year. However, he suffered a season-ending knee injury in his first training with the team.

== International career ==
Ogenia was born in the Netherlands, and is of Curaçaoan and Aruban descent. He was called up to the Curaçao U20s for 3 2017 CONCACAF U-20 Championship qualifying matches in 2016.
