= Théo Golliard =

Swiss footballer (born 2004)

Personal information
- Date of birth: 27 September 2002 (age 24)
- Place of birth: Riaz, Switzerland
- Height: 1.74 m (5 ft 9 in)
- Position: Midfielder

Team information
- Current team: Winterthur
- Number: 8

Youth career
- Fribourg
- 2019–2020: Young Boys

Senior career*
Years	Team	Apps	(Gls)
2020–2024	Young Boys U21	77	(27)
2022–2025	Young Boys	0	(0)
2023–2024	→ Vaduz (loan)	36	(5)
2024–2025	→ Helmond Sport (loan)	35	(6)
2025–	Winterthur	44	(7)

International career^{‡}
2022–2023	Switzerland U20	4	(0)
- * Club domestic league appearances and goals as of 28 September 2026 ‡ National team caps and goals as of 02:12, 26 October 2025 (UTC)

Théo Golliard (born 27 September 2002) is a Swiss professional footballer who plays as a midfielder for Swiss Super League club Winterthur.

== Club career ==
A youth product of Fribourg, Golliard moved to Young Boys's youth academy in 2019, and was promoted to their U21s in 2020. He debuted with the senior Young Boys team in a 10–1 Swiss Cup win over FC Schoenberg on 21 August 2022. On 12 December 2022, he signed his first professional contract with Young Boys for 3 seasons. On 3 July 2023, he joined the Liechtenstein club Vaduz on a year-long loan. On 27 August 2024, his contract with Young Boys was extended until 2026 and he joined the Dutch Eerste Divisie club Helmond Sport on loan for a season. On 24 July 2025, he transferred to Swiss Super League club Winterthur on a 2-year contract.

== International career ==
Golliard is a youth international for Switzerland, having played for the Switzerland U20s for a set of friendlies in 2022.

== Personal life ==
Golliard's father Michel is a coach in Switzerland, and his brother Robin plays in the Swiss Challenge League.

== Honours ==
Young Boys

- Swiss Cup: 2022–23

Vaduz

- Liechtenstein Cup: 2023–24
