= GS Staalwerken Stadion =

Sports venue in Helmond, Netherlands

MySteel Stadion Campus De Braak
- Interactive map of MySteel Stadion; Campus De Braak
- Full name: MySteel Stadion
- Location: Helmond, Netherlands
- Owner: Helmond Municipality; OMO Scholengroep
- Capacity: 3,600
- Surface: Template grass
- Field size: 102 x 66 m

Construction
- Groundbreaking: 2023
- Built: 2023–2025
- Opened: 7 March 2025; 20 months ago
- Architects: CULD; FaulknerBrowns Architects; MoederscheimMoonen

Tenant
- Helmond Sport

MySteel Stadion, also known as Campus De Braak, is an multi-purpose sports venue located in Helmond, Netherlands. The facility serves as the home ground of professional football club Helmond Sport and has a capacity of 3,600 spectators. In addition to football matches, the complex includes the secondary school Praktijkschool Helmond, an NOC*NSF sports hall, several gymnasiums, a physiotherapy practice, and facilities for amateur football club SV De Braak.

== History ==
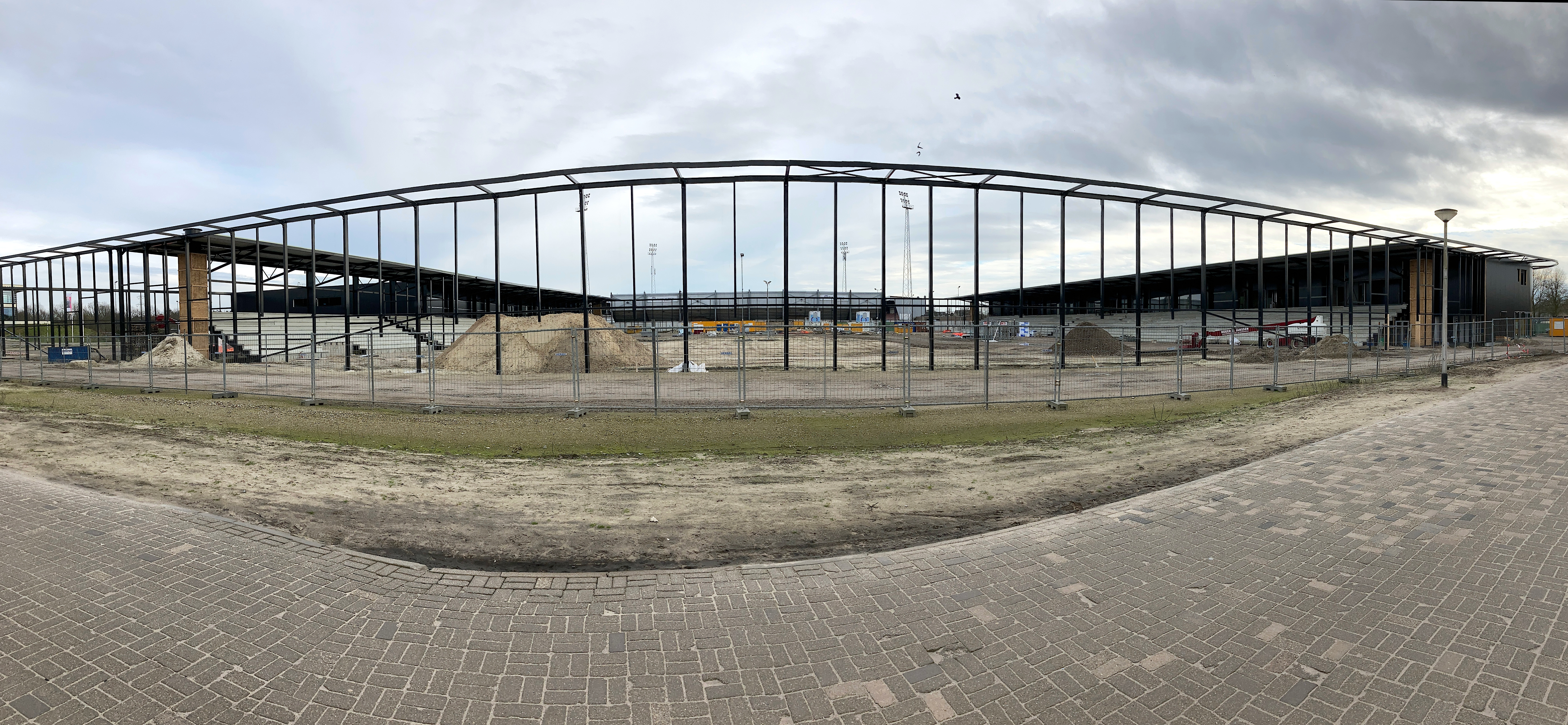
Stadium during construction in March 2024

After multiple proposals to replace Helmond Sport's former home ground, Stadion De Braak, construction of a new stadium began in 2023. The facility was designed to host professional football matches while also serving as a multi-purpose sports and educational complex. In addition to the stadium, the site includes a sports hall, a physiotherapy practice, amateur club SV De Braak, and a vocational college.

The first official match at the GS Staalwerken Stadion was held on Friday, 7 March 2025, as Helmond Sport faced MVV Maastricht in the Eerste Divisie. Anthony van den Hurk scored the first goal at the new stadium, helping Helmond Sport secure a 4–0 victory. The home team's hardcore supporters staged a boycott during the early part of the match in protest against the new ticket pricing structure.
