= Wouter van der Steen =

Dutch footballer (born 1990)

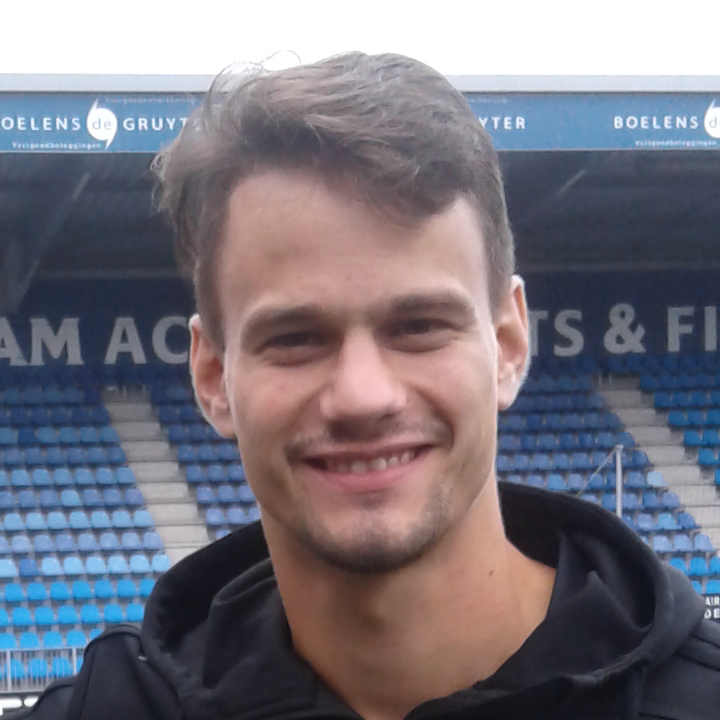
- Van der Steen in 2019

Personal information
- Date of birth: 3 June 1990 (age 36)
- Place of birth: Vught, Netherlands
- Height: 1.87 m (6 ft 2 in)
- Position: Goalkeeper

Team information
- Current team: Willem II
- Number: 21

Youth career
- –2000: Zwaluw VFC
- 2000–2006: PSV
- 2006–2010: Helmond Sport

Senior career*
Years	Team	Apps	(Gls)
2010–2016	Helmond Sport	146	(0)
2016–2018	Heerenveen	4	(0)
2018–2023	Den Bosch	176	(0)
2023–2025	Helmond Sport	69	(0)
2025–	Willem II	0	(0)
- * Club domestic league appearances and goals as of 15 May 2025

Wouter van der Steen (born 3 June 1990) is a Dutch professional footballer who plays as a goalkeeper for Eredivisie club Willem II. He formerly played for Helmond Sport, Heerenveen and Den Bosch.

== Club career ==
Van der Steen started his professional career with Eerste Divisie club Helmond Sport, where he was the starting goalkeeper from 2012 to 2016.

In 2016, he joined Eredivisie side Heerenveen. In the summer of 2018, he chose not to extend his contract with the club as he struggled to secure the position of their first-choice goalkeeper.

On 19 June 2023, Van der Steen agreed to return to Helmond Sport on a two-year deal.

In the summer of 2025, Van der Steen signed a one-season contract with Willem II.
