= 2017–18 Helmond Sport season =

Helmond Sport
2017–18 season
- Chairman: Philippe van Esch
- Manager: Roy Hendriksen
- Stadium: GS Staalwerken Stadion
- Eerste Divisie: 19th
- KNVB Cup: 1st round
- Top goalscorer: League: Jordy Thomassen (12 goals); All: Jordy Thomassen (12 goals)
- Highest home attendance: 2,891 (against SC Cambuur in 18th week)
- Lowest home attendance: 833 (against Jong AZ in 27th week)
- Average home league attendance: 1,628
- Biggest win: 3-0 (against SC Cambuur(h) in week 19); 3-0 (against Jong AZ(h) in week 27)
- Biggest defeat: 5-1 (against SC Cambuur(h) in the 1st round of KNVB Cp )
- All statistics correct as of 11 December 2024.

The 2017–18 season was Helmond Sport's 51st season in existence and 48th (34th consecutive) in the Eerste Divisie. Helmond Sport finished Eerste Divisie as 19th.

The club competed also in the KNVB Cup. Helmond Sport lost 5–1 against SC Cambuur in the 1st round of KNVB Cup and they are eliminated from the cup.

Jordy Thomassen was the top scorer of the club in this season with 12 goals in Eerste Divisie. (His 2nd consecutive)

Jason Bourdouxhe, Jordy Thomassen and Stijn van Gassel were the most appeared players in this season with a total of 39 appearances; 38 appearances in the Eerste Divisie and 1 appearance in the KNVB Cup. (2nd consecutive of Jordy Thomassen)

== Players ==
=== First-team squad ===
Note: Flags indicate national team as defined under FIFA eligibility rules; some limited exceptions apply. Players may hold more than one non-FIFA nationality.

| No. | Pos. | Nation | Player |
|---|---|---|---|
| 1 | GK | NED | Stijn van Gassel |
| 2 | DF | NED | Robert van Koesveld |
| 3 | DF | NED | Ron Janzen |
| 4 | DF | NED | Stephen Warmolts |
| 5 | DF | ENG | Brandon Ormonde-Ottewill |
| 6 | MF | NED | Steven Edwards |
| 7 | FW | NED | Giovanni Hiwat |
| 8 | DF | BEL | Jason Bourdouxhe |
| 9 | FW | BEL | Arne Naudts |
| 10 | FW | NED | Robert Braber |
| 11 | FW | NED | Furhgill Zeldenrust |
| 12 | FW | NED | Jordy Thomassen |
| 14 | MF | NED | Grad Damen |

| No. | Pos. | Nation | Player |
|---|---|---|---|
| 15 | DF | NED | Dylan de Braal |
| 16 | DF | NED | Maikel Verkoelen |
| 17 | FW | NED | Daan Ibrahim |
| 19 | FW | CUW | Maiky Fecunda |
| 20 | DF | NED | Gévero Markiet |
| 23 | FW | NED | Joey Godee |
| 25 | FW | NED | Marijn van Heugten |
| 26 | DF | NED | Jeroen Verkennis |
| 27 | MF | NED | Wietse van Lankveld |
| 28 | MF | NED | Nick de Louw |
| 32 | MF | NED | Bram Zwanen |
| 36 | FW | NED | Charlton Vicento |

== Transfers ==
=== In ===
| Pos. | Player | Transferred from | Fee | Date |
|---|---|---|---|---|
| DF | (Netherlands) Dylan de Braal | (Netherlands) TOP Oss | Free | 1 July 2017 |
| FW | (Belgium) Arne Naudts | (Belgium) Cercle Brugge | Free | 12 July 2017 |
| MF | (Netherlands) Grad Damen | (Netherlands) NAC Breda | On loan | 24 July 2017 |
| DF | (England) Brandon Ormonde-Ottewill | (England) Swindon Town F.C. | Free | 28 July 2017 |
| DF | (Netherlands) Gévero Markiet | (Germany) FC 08 Homburg | Free | 24 August 2017 |
| FW | (Netherlands) Joey Godee | (Netherlands) FC Dordrecht | Free | 31 August 2017 |

=== Out ===
| Pos. | Player | Transferred to | Fee | Date |
|---|---|---|---|---|
| FW | (Netherlands) Teije ten Den | (Netherlands) Go Ahead Eagles | Free | 30 June 2017 |
| FW | (Netherlands) Marc Höcher | (Netherlands) De Treffers | Free | 1 July 2017 |
| FW | (Netherlands) Max de Boom | (Netherlands) VV Pelikaan-S | Free | 1 July 2017 |
| FW | (Germany) Shpend Hasani | (Germany) FC Wegberg-Beeck | Free | 1 July 2017 |
| MF | (Curaçao) Yaël Eisden | (Netherlands) Jong RKC | Free | 1 July 2017 |
| GK | (Belgium) Ferhat Kaya | (Turkey) Sakaryaspor | | 10 July 2017 |
| DF | (Curaçao) Gillian Justiana | (Netherlands) IJsselmeervogels | Free | 31 August 2017 |

== Competitions ==
=== Overall record ===
| Competition | First match | Last match | Starting round | Final position | Record | | | | | | | |
| Competition | First match | Last match | Starting round | Final position | Pld | W | D | L | GF | GA | GD | Win % |
|---|---|---|---|---|---|---|---|---|---|---|---|---|
| Eerste Divisie | 18 August 2017 | 28 April 2018 | Week 1 | 19th | 38 | 9 | 9 | 20 | 50 | 67 | −17 | 23.68 |
| KNVB Cup | 19 September 2017 | | 1st round | 1st round | 1 | 0 | 0 | 1 | 1 | 5 | −4 | 0.00 |
| Total | | | | | 39 | 9 | 9 | 21 | 51 | 72 | −21 | 23.08 |

Source: ESPN

=== Eerste Divisie ===
==== Results summary ====
| Overall | | | | | | | | Home | | | | | | Away | | | | | |
| Pld | W | D | L | GF | GA | GD | Pts | W | D | L | GF | GA | GD | W | D | L | GF | GA | GD |
|---|---|---|---|---|---|---|---|---|---|---|---|---|---|---|---|---|---|---|---|
| 38 | 9 | 9 | 20 | 50 | 67 | −17 | 36 | 6 | 3 | 10 | 29 | 32 | −3 | 3 | 6 | 10 | 21 | 35 | −14 |

Source: ESPN

==== Results by round ====
| Round | 1 | 2 | 3 | 4 | 5 | 6 | 7 | 8 | 9 | 10 | 11 | 12 | 13 | 14 | 15 | 16 | 17 | 18 | 19 | 20 | 21 | 22 | 23 | 24 | 25 | 26 | 27 | 28 | 29 | 30 | 31 | 32 | 33 | 34 | 35 | 36 | 37 | 38 |
|---|---|---|---|---|---|---|---|---|---|---|---|---|---|---|---|---|---|---|---|---|---|---|---|---|---|---|---|---|---|---|---|---|---|---|---|---|---|---|
| Ground | A | H | H | A | H | H | A | H | A | H | A | H | A | A | H | A | A | H | H | A | H | H | A | A | H | A | H | A | H | A | H | A | A | H | A | H | A | H |
| Result | D | L | D | L | L | L | D | L | W | L | D | W | D | L | L | L | D | D | W | W | L | L | L | L | W | L | W | W | W | D | W | L | L | L | L | L | L | D |
| Position | | | | | | | | | | | | | | | | | | | | | | | | | | | | | | | | | | | | | | 19 |

Source: ESPN
A = Away; H = Home; W = Win; D = Draw; L = Loss

=== Matches ===
==== 1st half ====
| 18 August 2017 Week 1 | FC Volendam | 2-2 | Helmond Sport | Volendam |
| 20:00 | Nick Runderkamp 10'; Teije ten Den 19' | Report | Arne Naudts 64'; Ron Janzen 87' | Stadium: Kras Stadion; Attendance: 2,581 |

| 25 August 2017 Week 2 | Helmond Sport | 1-2 | Jong PSV | Helmond |
| 20:00 | Furhgill Zeldenrust 59' | Report | Nikolai Laursen 75' 88' | Stadium: GS Staalwerken Stadion; Attendance: 2,211 |

| 1 September 2017 Week 3 | Helmond Sport | 1-1 | Go Ahead Eagles | Helmond |
| 20:00 | Jordy Thomassen 90+1' | Report | Leon de Kogel 29' | Stadium: GS Staalwerken Stadion; Attendance: 1,993 |

| 8 September 2017 Week 4 | Almere City FC | 3-1 | Helmond Sport | Almere |
| 20:00 | Damon Mirani 22'; Arsenio Valpoort 49' 72' | Report | Furhgill Zeldenrust 76' (pen.) | Stadium: Yanmar Stadion; Attendance: 1,189 |

| 15 September 2017 Week 5 | Helmond Sport | 1-4 | Jong Ajax | Helmond |
| 20:00 | Furhgill Zeldenrust 44' (pen.) | Report | Carel Eiting 30'; Mateo Casierra 57' (pen.) 63'; Dennis Johnsen 88' | Stadium: GS Staalwerken Stadion; Attendance: 1,911 |

| 22 September 2017 Week 6 | Helmond Sport | 1-2 | FC Dordrecht | Helmond |
| 20:00 | Furhgill Zeldenrust 28' (pen.) | Report | Jafar Arias 50'; Cendrino Misidjan 62' | Stadium: GS Staalwerken Stadion; Attendance: 1,731 |

| 29 September 2017 Week 7 | Jong FC Utrecht | 0-0 | Helmond Sport | Bunschoten |
| 20:00 | | Report | | Stadium: Sportpark De Westmaat; Attendance: 565 |

| 6 October 2017 Week 8 | Helmond Sport | 0-2 | De Graafschap | Helmond |
| 20:00 | | Report | Daryl van Mieghem 55'; Mark Diemers 89' | Stadium: GS Staalwerken Stadion; Attendance: 2,047 |

| 16 October 2017 Week 9 | Jong AZ | 1-3 | Helmond Sport | Wijdewormer |
| 20:00 | Fred Friday 50' | Report | Robert Braber 44'; Grad Damen 72'; Arne Naudts 90+3' | Stadium: AFAS Trainingscomplex; Attendance: 713 |

| 20 October 2017 Week 10 | Helmond Sport | 1-2 | Telstar | Helmond |
| 20:00 | Arne Naudts 24' | Report | Andrija Novakovich 5'; Mohamed Hamdaoui 45+1' | Stadium: GS Staalwerken Stadion; Attendance: 1,579 |

| 27 October 2017 Week 11 | FC Den Bosch | 2-2 | Helmond Sport | Den Bosch |
| 20:00 | Dennis Kaars 10'; Bart Biemans 76' | Report | Arne Naudts 18'; Charlton Vicento 65' | Stadium: De Vliert; Attendance: 2,659 |

| 3 November 2017 Week 12 | Helmond Sport | 3-1 | FC Emmen | Helmond |
| 20:00 | Arne Naudts 32'; Steven Edwards 60' 67' | Report | Youri Loen 12' | Stadium: GS Staalwerken Stadion; Attendance: 1,331 |

| 17 November 2017 Week 13 | TOP Oss | 0-0 | Helmond Sport | Oss |
| 20:00 | | Report | | Stadium: Frans Heesen Stadion; Attendance: 1,923 |

| 24 November 2017 Week 14 | MVV Maastricht | 3-1 | Helmond Sport | Maastricht |
| 20:00 | Jonathan Okita 4'; Koen Kostons 39'; Dean Koolhof 88' | Report | Arne Naudts 80' | Stadium: De Geusselt; Attendance: 4,429 |

| 27 November 2017 Week 15 | Helmond Sport | 1-3 | Fortuna Sittard | Helmond |
| 20:00 | Arne Naudts 30' | Report | André Vidigal 18' 36'; Stefan Askovski 90+2' | Stadium: GS Staalwerken Stadion; Attendance: 1,031 |

| 1 December 2017 Week 16 | RKC Waalwijk | 1-0 | Helmond Sport | Waalwijk |
| 20:00 | Serginho Greene 52' | Report | | Stadium: Mandemakers Stadion; Attendance: 2,411 |

| 15 December 2017 Week 17 | N.E.C. | 1-1 | Helmond Sport | Nijmegen |
| 20:00 | Jordan Larsson 18' | Report | Giovanni Hiwat 54' | Stadium: Goffertstadion; Attendance: 9,251 |

| 18 December 2017 Week 18 | Helmond Sport | 0-0 | FC Eindhoven | Helmond |
| 20:00 | | Report | | Stadium: GS Staalwerken Stadion; Attendance: 2,891 |

| 22 December 2017 Week 19 | Helmond Sport | 3-0 | SC Cambuur | Helmond |
| 20:00 | Jason Bourdouxhe 30'; Robert Braber 53'; Jordy Thomassen 90+5' | Report | | Stadium: GS Staalwerken Stadion; Attendance: 1,163 |

==== 2nd half ====
| 12 January 2018 Week 20 | Jong PSV | 1-2 | Helmond Sport | Eindhoven |
| 20:00 | Matthias Verreth 14' | Report | Jordy Thomassen 65'; Steven Edwards 70' | Stadium: De Herdgang; Attendance: 528 |

| 19 January 2018 Week 21 | Helmond Sport | 1-4 | FC Volendam | Helmond |
| 20:00 | Jordy Thomassen 69' | Report | Enzo Stroo 29'; Joey Veerman 42'; Kevin Visser 45'; Rodney Antwi 84' | Stadium: GS Staalwerken Stadion; Attendance: 1,367 |

| 26 January 2018 Week 22 | Helmond Sport | 1-2 | Almere City FC | Helmond |
| 20:00 | Giovanni Hiwat 65' | Report | Dennis van der Heijden 73'; Calvin Mac-Intosch 90+3' | Stadium: GS Staalwerken Stadion; Attendance: 1,176 |

| 5 February 2018 Week 23 | Jong Ajax | 2-0 | Helmond Sport | Duivendrecht |
| 20:00 | Amin Younes 22'; Victor Jensen 84' | Report | | Stadium: Sportpark De Toekomst; Attendance: 398 |

| 9 February 2018 Week 24 | FC Dordrecht | 3-2 | Helmond Sport | Dordrecht |
| 20:30 | Denis Mahmudov 24'; Robert Mutzers 57'; Gustavo Hamer 70' | Report | Jordy Thomassen 44' 81' | Stadium: M-Scores Stadion; Attendance: 1,143 |

| 16 February 2018 Week 25 | Helmond Sport | 2-0 | Jong FC Utrecht | Helmond |
| 20:00 | Charlton Vicento 40'; Marijn van Heugten 85' | Report | | Stadium: GS Staalwerken Stadion; Attendance: 1,131 |

| 23 February 2018 Week 26 | De Graafschap | 1-0 | Helmond Sport | Doetinchem |
| 20:00 | Mark Diemers 13' | Report | | Stadium: De Vijverberg; Attendance: 7,411 |

| 2 March 2018 Week 27 | Helmond Sport | 3-0 | Jong AZ | Helmond |
| 20:00 | Robert van Koesveld 48'; Jordy Thomassen 67' 89' | Report | | Stadium: GS Staalwerken Stadion; Attendance: 833 |

| 9 March 2018 Week 28 | Telstar | 2-3 | Helmond Sport | Velsen-Zuid |
| 20:00 | Melvin Platje 23' 75' | Report | Jordy Thomassen 48' 59'; Ron Janzen 80' | Stadium: 711 Stadion; Attendance: 2,874 |

| 12 March 2018 Week 29 | Helmond Sport | 3-1 | FC Den Bosch | Helmond |
| 20:00 | Robert Braber 42'; Jordy Thomassen 87'; Furhgill Zeldenrust 90+2' | Report | Niek Vossebelt 23' (pen.) | Stadium: GS Staalwerken Stadion; Attendance: 1,476 |

| 16 March 2018 Week 30 | FC Emmen | 0-0 | Helmond Sport | Emmen |
| 20:00 | | Report | | Stadium: De Oude Meerdijk; Attendance: 2,850 |

| 23 March 2018 Week 31 | Helmond Sport | 2-1 | TOP Oss | Helmond |
| 20:00 | Ron Janzen 12'; Giovanni Hiwat 59' | Report | Huseyin Dogan 70' | Stadium: GS Staalwerken Stadion; Attendance: 1,791 |

| 30 March 2018 Week 32 | Go Ahead Eagles | 3-1 | Helmond Sport | Deventer |
| 20:00 | Joey Suk 33'; Givan Werkhoven 82' 90+3' | Report | Furhgill Zeldenrust 69' | Stadium: De Adelaarshorst; Attendance: 7,173 |

| 2 April 2018 Week 33 | Fortuna Sittard | 3-0 | Helmond Sport | Sittard |
| 14:30 | Lars Hutten 6'; Mica Pinto 8'; Lisandro Semedo 53' | Report | | Stadium: Fortuna Sittard Stadion; Attendance: 6,012 |

| 6 April 2018 Week 34 | Helmond Sport | 2-3 | MVV Maastricht | Helmond |
| 20:00 | Arne Naudts 36'; Jordy Thomassen 60' | Report | Jonathan Okita 10' 32' 90' | Stadium: GS Staalwerken Stadion; Attendance: 1,981 |

| 9 April 2018 Week 35 | FC Eindhoven | 3-2 | Helmond Sport | Eindhoven |
| 20:00 | Tibo van de Velde 52' 54'; Tibeau Swinnen 70' | Report | Arne Naudts 28' 63' | Stadium: Jan Louwers Stadion; Attendance: 2,419 |

| 13 April 2018 Week 36 | Helmond Sport | 1-2 | N.E.C. | Helmond |
| 20:00 | Robert Braber 20' | Report | Arnaut Danjuma 7'; Michael Heinloth 9' | Stadium: GS Staalwerken Stadion; Attendance: 1,936 |

| 20 April 2018 Week 37 | SC Cambuur | 4-1 | Helmond Sport | Leeuwarden |
| 20:00 | Matthew Steenvoorden 50'; Justin Mathieu 63'; Kevin van Kippersluis 74'; Ricardo Kip 87' | Report | Robert Braber 58' | Stadium: Cambuur Stadion; Attendance: 8,233 |

| 28 April 2018 Week 38 | Helmond Sport | 2-2 | RKC Waalwijk | Helmond |
| 19:45 | Robert Braber 1'; Arne Naudts 16' | Report | Dylan Seys 9'; Robert van Koesveld 9' (o.g.); Irvingly van Eijma 50' | Stadium: GS Staalwerken Stadion; Attendance: 1,741 |

=== KNVB Cup ===
| 19 September 2017 First round | Helmond Sport | 1-5 | SC Cambuur | Helmond |
| 19:45 | Gévero Markiet 68' | Report | Kevin van Kippersluis 11' 52'; Karim Rossi 78'; Issa Kallon 81'; Nigel Robertha 89' | Stadium: GS Staalwerken Stadion; Attendance: 1,245 |

== Statistics ==
=== Scorers ===
| # | Player | Eerste Divisie | KNVB |
|---|---|---|---|
| 1 | (Netherlands) Jordy Thomassen | 12 | 0 |
| 2 | (Belgium) Arne Naudts | 11 | 0 |
| 3 | (Netherlands) Furhgill Zeldenrust | 6 | 0 |
| 3 | (Netherlands) Robert Braber | 6 | 0 |
| 5 | (Netherlands) Giovanni Hiwat | 3 | 0 |
| 5 | (Netherlands) Ron Janzen | 3 | 0 |
| 5 | (Netherlands) Steven Edwards | 3 | 0 |
| 8 | (Netherlands) Charlton Vicento | 2 | 0 |
| 9 | (Netherlands) Gévero Markiet | 0 | 1 |
| 9 | (Netherlands) Grad Damen | 1 | 0 |
| 9 | (Belgium) Jason Bourdouxhe | 1 | 0 |
| 9 | (Netherlands) Marijn van Heugten | 1 | 0 |
| 9 | (Netherlands) Robert van Koesveld | 1 | 0 |

=== Appearances ===
| # | Player | Eerste Divisie | KNVB | Total |
|---|---|---|---|---|
| 1 | (Belgium) Jason Bourdouxhe | 38 | 1 | 39 |
| 1 | (Netherlands) Jordy Thomassen | 38 | 1 | 39 |
| 1 | (Netherlands) Stijn van Gassel | 38 | 1 | 39 |
| 4 | (Netherlands) Robert Braber | 34 | 1 | 35 |
| 4 | (Netherlands) Stephen Warmolts | 34 | 1 | 35 |
| 6 | (Netherlands) Giovanni Hiwat | 32 | 1 | 33 |
| 7 | (Belgium) Arne Naudts | 27 | 1 | 28 |
| 7 | (Netherlands) Furhgill Zeldenrust | 27 | 1 | 28 |
| 9 | (Netherlands) Robert van Koesveld | 26 | 1 | 27 |
| 10 | (Netherlands) Steven Edwards | 25 | 1 | 26 |
| 11 | (Netherlands) Bram Zwanen | 24 | 1 | 25 |
| 11 | (Netherlands) Charlton Vicento | 25 | 0 | 25 |
| 13 | (Netherlands) Dylan de Braal | 24 | 0 | 24 |
| 13 | (Netherlands) Grad Damen | 24 | 0 | 24 |
| 13 | (Netherlands) Ron Janzen | 24 | 0 | 24 |
| 16 | (Netherlands) Jeroen Verkennis | 21 | 0 | 21 |
| 17 | (Curaçao) Maiky Fecunda | 17 | 1 | 18 |
| 18 | (Netherlands) Maikel Verkoelen | 9 | 0 | 9 |
| 19 | (Netherlands) Gévero Markiet | 6 | 1 | 7 |
| 19 | (Netherlands) Joey Godee | 6 | 1 | 7 |
| 21 | (Netherlands) Marijn van Heugten | 5 | 0 | 5 |
| 22 | (Syria) Daan Ibrahim | 3 | 0 | 3 |
| 22 | (Netherlands) Nick de Louw | 3 | 0 | 3 |
| 22 | (Netherlands) Wietse van Lankveld | 3 | 0 | 3 |
| 25 | (England) Brandon Ormonde-Ottewill | 1 | 0 | 1 |

=== Clean sheets ===
| # | Player | Eerste Divisie |
|---|---|---|
| 1 | (Netherlands) Stijn van Gassel | 7 |
| Total | | 7 |

=== Disciplinary record ===
| # | Player | Eerste Divisie | | KNVB | | Total | |
| # | Player | Booked | Sent off (straight red) | Booked | Sent off (straight red) | Booked | Sent off (straight red) |
|---|---|---|---|---|---|---|---|
| 1 | (Netherlands) Stephen Warmolts | 7 | 2 | 0 | 0 | 7 | 2 |
| 2 | (Netherlands) Dylan de Braal | 6 | 1 | 0 | 0 | 6 | 1 |
| 2 | (Netherlands) Ron Janzen | 6 | 1 | 0 | 0 | 6 | 1 |
| 2 | (Netherlands) Steven Edwards | 6 | 0 | 0 | 1 | 6 | 1 |
| 5 | (Curaçao) Maiky Fecunda | 5 | 1 | 0 | 0 | 5 | 1 |
| 6 | (Netherlands) Robert van Koesveld | 2 | 0 | 0 | 1 | 2 | 1 |
| 7 | (Netherlands) Marijn van Heugten | 0 | 1 | 0 | 0 | 0 | 1 |
| 8 | (Netherlands) Robert Braber | 7 | 0 | 0 | 0 | 7 | 0 |
| 9 | (Netherlands) Bram Zwanen | 4 | 0 | 0 | 0 | 4 | 0 |
| 9 | (Netherlands) Jordy Thomassen | 4 | 0 | 0 | 0 | 4 | 0 |
| 11 | (Netherlands) Giovanni Hiwat | 3 | 0 | 0 | 0 | 3 | 0 |
| 11 | (Belgium) Jason Bourdouxhe | 3 | 0 | 0 | 0 | 3 | 0 |
| 11 | (Netherlands) Jeroen Verkennis | 3 | 0 | 0 | 0 | 3 | 0 |
| 14 | (Netherlands) Charlton Vicento | 2 | 0 | 0 | 0 | 2 | 0 |
| 15 | (Netherlands) Furhgill Zeldenrust | 1 | 0 | 0 | 0 | 1 | 0 |
| 15 | (Netherlands) Grad Damen | 1 | 0 | 0 | 0 | 1 | 0 |
| 15 | (Netherlands) Joey Godee | 1 | 0 | 0 | 0 | 1 | 0 |
| 15 | (Netherlands) Maikel Verkoelen | 1 | 0 | 0 | 0 | 1 | 0 |
