= 2016–17 Helmond Sport season =

Helmond Sport
2016–17 season
- Chairman: Philippe van Esch
- Manager: Roy Hendriksen
- Stadium: GS Staalwerken Stadion
- Eerste Divisie: 13th
- KNVB Cup: 1st round
- Top goalscorer: League: Jordy Thomassen (15 goals); All: Jordy Thomassen (15 goals)
- Highest home attendance: 3,431 (against Roda JC Kerkrade in promotion play-off 2nd round 1st match)
- Lowest home attendance: 1,011 (against De Graafschap in 30th week)
- Average home league attendance: 1,942
- Biggest win: 4-1 (against FC Dordrecht(a) in week 11); 3-0 (against FC Eindhoven(h) in week 17)
- Biggest defeat: 7-0 (against VVV-Venlo(a) in week 25)
- All statistics correct as of 22 November 2024.

The 2016–17 season was Helmond Sport's 50th season in existence and 47th (33rd consecutive) in the Eerste Divisie. Helmond Sport finished Eerste Divisie as 13th.

The club competed also in the KNVB Cup. Helmond Sport lost 3–0 against Kozakken Boys in the 1st round of KNVB Cup and they are eliminated from the cup.

Jordy Thomassen was the top scorer of the club in this season with 15 goals in Eerste Divisie.

Jordy Thomassen was also the most appeared player in the season with a total of 42 appearances; 41 appearances in the Eerste Divisie and 1 appearance in the KNVB Cup.

== Players ==
=== First-team squad ===
As of 31 January 2017

Note: Flags indicate national team as defined under FIFA eligibility rules; some limited exceptions apply. Players may hold more than one non-FIFA nationality.

No.	Pos.	Nation	Player
1	GK	BEL	Ferhat Kaya
2	DF	NED	Robert van Koesveld
3	DF	NED	Ron Janzen
4	DF	NED	Stephen Warmolts
5	MF	CUW	Gillian Justiana
6	MF	NED	Steven Edwards
7	FW	NED	Giovanni Hiwat
8	DF	BEL	Jason Bourdouxhe
9	FW	NED	Robert Braber
10	FW	NED	Marc Höcher
11	FW	NED	Furhgill Zeldenrust
12	FW	NED	Jordy Thomassen
14	MF	NED	Max de Boom
15	FW	SUR	Gyrano Kerk

No.	Pos.	Nation	Player
15	FW	GER	Shpend Hasani
16	DF	NED	Maikel Verkoelen
17	MF	NED	Colin van Gool
18	MF	NED	Sam Strijbosch
19	FW	CUW	Maiky Fecunda
20	FW	NED	Teije ten Den
25	FW	NED	Marijn van Heugten
26	DF	NED	Jeroen Verkennis
27	MF	NED	Wietse van Lankveld
28	MF	NED	Nick De Louw
29	DF	NED	Tim Rerimassie
30	GK	NED	Stijn van Gassel
37	MF	NED	Yaël Eisden

== Transfers ==
=== In ===
Pos.	Player	Transferred from	Fee	Date
GK	(Netherlands) Ferhat Kaya	(Netherlands) Fortuna Sittard	Free	1 July 2016
MF	(Netherlands) Furhgill Zeldenrust	(Netherlands) FC Den Bosch	Free	1 July 2016
FW	(Netherlands) Giovanni Hiwat	(Netherlands) Sparta Rotterdam	Free	1 July 2016
DF	(Belgium) Jason Bourdouxhe	(Netherlands) VVV-Venlo	Free	1 July 2016
FW	(Netherlands) Jordy Thomassen	(Netherlands) FC Den Bosch	Free	1 July 2016
DF	(Netherlands) Maikel Verkoelen	(Netherlands) RKC Waalwijk	Free	1 July 2016
FW	(Netherlands) Marc Höcher	(Germany) FC Rot-Weiß Erfurt	Free	1 July 2016
MF	(Netherlands) Nick De Louw	(Netherlands) VVV-Venlo U19	Free	1 July 2016
FW	(Netherlands) Robert Braber	(Netherlands) Willem II Tilburg	Free	1 July 2016
DF	(Netherlands) Robert van Koesveld	(Netherlands) SC Heerenveen	On loan	13 July 2016
DF	(Netherlands) Ron Janzen	(Netherlands) RKC Waalwijk	Free	1 July 2016
FW	(Germany) Shpend Hasani	(Germany) Alemannia Aachen	Free	1 July 2016
FW	(Netherlands) Teije ten Den	(Netherlands) Go Ahead Eagles	On loan	31 August 2016
MF	(Netherlands) Yaël Eisden	No club	Free	1 January 2017
MF	(Netherlands) Max de Boom	(Netherlands) PEC Zwolle U21	Free	31 January 2017

=== Out ===
Pos.	Player	Transferred to	Fee	Date
MF	(Netherlands) Carlo de Reuver	(Netherlands) Excelsior Rotterdam	End of loan	30 June 2016
DF	(Netherlands) Gévero Markiet	(Netherlands) FC Utrecht	End of loan	30 June 2016
DF	(Netherlands) Kai Heerings	(Netherlands) SC Cambuur Leeuwarden	End of loan	30 June 2016
MF	(Netherlands) Mounir El Allouchi	(Netherlands) NAC Breda	End of loan	30 June 2016
DF	(Netherlands) Yannick Cortie	(Netherlands) FC Utrecht	End of loan	30 June 2016
DF	(Netherlands) Jeffrey van Nuland	(Netherlands) Kozakken Boys	Free	1 July 2016
FW	(Netherlands) Joost van Heck	(Netherlands) VV SBC	Free	1 July 2016
MF	(Netherlands) Kevin Visser	(Netherlands) FC Volendam	Free	1 July 2016
FW	(Netherlands) Marc Koot	(Netherlands) UDI '19	Free	1 July 2016
MF	(Netherlands) Roel van de Sande	(Netherlands) RKC Waalwijk	Free	1 July 2016
DF	(Netherlands) Sven van de Kerkhof	(Belgium) FC Esperanza Pelt	Free	1 July 2016
FW	(Netherlands) Thomas Schilders	(Netherlands) JVC Cuijk	Free	1 July 2016
FW	(Netherlands) Wouter van der Steen	(Netherlands) SC Heerenveen	Free	1 July 2016

== Competitions ==
=== Overall record ===
Competition	First match	Last match	Starting round	Final position	Record							
Competition	First match	Last match	Starting round	Final position	Pld	W	D	L	GF	GA	GD	Win %
Eerste Divisie	5 August 2016	28 April 2017	Week 1	13th	38	14	7	17	52	67	−15	36.84
Promotion/relegation play-offs	8 May 2017	21 May 2017	1st round	2nd round	4	2	1	1	7	4	+3	50.00
KNVB Cup	20 September 2016		1st round	1st round	1	0	0	1	0	3	−3	0.00
Total					43	16	8	19	59	74	−15	37.21

Source: ESPN

=== Eerste Divisie ===
==== Results summary ====
Overall								Home						Away					
Pld	W	D	L	GF	GA	GD	Pts	W	D	L	GF	GA	GD	W	D	L	GF	GA	GD
38	14	7	17	51	67	−16	49	10	4	5	30	23	+7	4	3	12	21	44	−23

Source: ESPN

==== Results by round ====
Round	1	2	3	4	5	6	7	8	9	10	11	12	13	14	15	16	17	18	19	20	21	22	23	24	25	26	27	28	29	30	31	32	33	34	35	36	37	38
Ground	H	A	H	A	H	A	H	H	A	H	A	A	H	A	H	A	H	A	H	A	H	A	A	H	A	H	H	A	A	H	A	H	A	H	H	A	H	A
Result	D	L	L	L	W	W	W	D	L	W	W	L	W	W	W	D	W	D	L	L	W	W	L	L	L	L	D	L	L	L	L	W	L	W	W	L	D	D
Position																																						13

Source: ESPN
A = Away; H = Home; W = Win; D = Draw; L = Loss

=== Matches ===
==== 1st half ====
5 August 2016 Week 1	Helmond Sport	2-2	MVV Maastricht	Helmond
20:00	Steven Edwards 10' (pen.); Jordy Thomassen 90'	Report	Nick Kuipers 46'; Emrullah Güvenç 90+4'	Stadium: GS Staalwerken Stadion; Attendance: 1,800

12 August 2016 Week 2	TOP Oss	3-1	Helmond Sport	Oss
20:00	Nassir El Aissati 64'; Tom Boere 83' 87' (pen.)	Report	Jason Bourdouxhe 18'	Stadium: Frans Heesen Stadion; Attendance: 1,900

19 August 2016 Week 3	Helmond Sport	1-2	Achilles '29	Helmond
20:00	Giovanni Hiwat 26'	Report	Omid Popalzay 18'; Thijs Hendriks 69'	Stadium: GS Staalwerken Stadion; Attendance: 1,621

22 August 2016 Week 4	SC Telstar	4-2	Helmond Sport	Velsen-Zuid
20:00	Crescendo van Berkel 25'; Oussama Zamouri 37'; Fabian Serrarens 45'; Mohammed Ajnane 87'	Report	Jordy Thomassen 55' 68' (pen.)	Stadium: 711 Stadion; Attendance: 1,299

26 August 2016 Week 5	Helmond Sport	1-0	SC Cambuur Leeuwarden	Helmond
20:00	Marc Höcher 35'	Report		Stadium: GS Staalwerken Stadion; Attendance: 1,331

9 September 2016 Week 6	FC Emmen	1-2	Helmond Sport	Emmen
20:00	Rogier Krohne 90+3'	Report	Steven Edwards 17'; Jason Bourdouxhe 37'	Stadium: De Oude Meerdijk; Attendance: 3,244

16 September 2016 Week 7	Helmond Sport	2-1	VVV-Venlo	Helmond
20:00	Teije ten Den 82' (pen.); Furhgill Zeldenrust 87'	Report	Vito van Crooij 85' (pen.)	Stadium: GS Staalwerken Stadion; Attendance: 2,397

23 September 2016 Week 8	Helmond Sport	1-1	RKC Waalwijk	Helmond
20:00	Jordy Thomassen 17'	Report	Daan Rienstra 83'	Stadium: GS Staalwerken Stadion; Attendance: 1,812

30 September 2016 Week 9	Jong FC Utrecht	1-0	Helmond Sport	Utrecht
20:00	Sylla Sow 28'	Report		Stadium: Stadion Galgenwaard; Attendance: 874

14 October 2016 Week 10	Helmond Sport	2-0	FC Volendam	Helmond
20:00	Furhgill Zeldenrust 16'; Teije ten Den 63'	Report		Stadium: GS Staalwerken Stadion; Attendance: 2,562

21 October 2016 Week 11	De Graafschap	2-4	Helmond Sport	Doetinchem
20:00	Youssef El Jebli 21'; Anthony van den Hurk 87'	Report	Jordy Thomassen 12' 26' 35'; Giovanni Hiwat 16'	Stadium: De Vijverberg

28 October 2016 Week 12	Almere City FC	1-0	Helmond Sport	Almere
20:00	Soufyan Ahannach 90+4'	Report		Stadium: Yanmar Stadion; Attendance: 1,576

4 November 2016 Week 13	Helmond Sport	1-0	Jong PSV	Helmond
20:00	Marc Höcher 50'	Report		Stadium: GS Staalwerken Stadion; Attendance: 2,578

18 November 2016 Week 14	FC Dordrecht	1-4	Helmond Sport	Dordrecht
20:00	Joel Thomas 61'	Report	Jordy Thomassen 12' 38'; Furhgill Zeldenrust 45+1'; Marc Höcher 72'	Stadium: M-Scores Stadion; Attendance: 1,641

25 November 2016 Week 15	Helmond Sport	1-0	Fortuna Sittard	Helmond
20:00	Maikel Verkoelen 75'	Report		Stadium: GS Staalwerken Stadion; Attendance: 2,382

28 November 2016 Week 16	NAC Breda	0-0	Helmond Sport	Breda
20:00		Report		Stadium: Rat Verlegh Stadion; Attendance: 10,435

2 December 2016 Week 17	Helmond Sport	3-0	FC Eindhoven	Helmond
20:00	Steven Edwards 63'; Furhgill Zeldenrust 64'; Robert Braber 67'	Report		Stadium: GS Staalwerken Stadion; Attendance: 3,195

9 December 2016 Week 18	FC Den Bosch	1-1	Helmond Sport	Den Bosch
20:00	Arda Havar 76'	Report	Gillian Justiana 81'	Stadium: Stadion De Vliert; Attendance: 3,567

16 December 2016 Week 19	Helmond Sport	2-4	Jong Ajax	Helmond
20:00	Terry Lartey Sanniez 17' (o.g.); Teije ten Den 84'	Report	Justin Kluivert 35'; Deyovaiso Zeefuik 54'; Damil Dankerlui 60'; Noussair Mazraoui 86'	Stadium: GS Staalwerken Stadion; Attendance: 2,491

==== 2nd half ====
13 January 2017 Week 20	MVV Maastricht	2-0	Helmond Sport	Maastricht
20:00	Alessandro Ciranni 55'; Joeri Schroyen 57'	Report		Stadium: De Geusselt; Attendance: 4,188

20 January 2017 Week 21	Helmond Sport	3-1	TOP Oss	Helmond
20:00	Teije ten Den 2' 61'; Gillian Justiana 56'	Report	Tom Boere 17'	Stadium: GS Staalwerken Stadion; Attendance: 1,231

27 January 2017 Week 22	Achilles '29	1-2	Helmond Sport	Leeuwarden
20:00	Robert van Koesveld 82' (o.g.)	Report	Robert Braber 27'; Robert van Koesveld 89'	Stadium: Sportpark de Heikant; Attendance: 1,000

3 February 2017 Week 23	SC Cambuur Leeuwarden	3-0	Helmond Sport	Leeuwarden
20:00	Jordy van Deelen 2'; Stefano Lilipaly 64'; Jamiro Monteiro 89'	Report		Stadium: Cambuur Stadion; Attendance: 8,083

6 February 2017 Week 24	Helmond Sport	3-4	SC Telstar	Helmond
20:00	Jordy Thomassen 18' 75'; Furhgill Zeldenrust 41'	Report	Benjamin van den Broek 17' 53'; Fabian Serrarens 47' 72'	Stadium: GS Staalwerken Stadion; Attendance: 1,286

10 February 2017 Week 25	VVV-Venlo	7-0	Helmond Sport	Venlo
20:00	Vito van Crooij 5'; Joey Sleegers 47'; Jerold Promes 53'; Ralf Seuntjens 59'; Clint Leemans 61'; Danny Post 63'; Gedion Zelalem 87'	Report		Stadium: Covebo Stadion - De Koel - Attendance: 5,011

17 February 2017 Week 26	Helmond Sport	1-3	FC Emmen	Helmond
20:00	Furhgill Zeldenrust 81'	Report	Issa Kallon 7'; Cas Peters 28'; Frank Olijve 37'	Stadium: GS Staalwerken Stadion; Attendance: 1,516

24 February 2017 Week 27	Helmond Sport	1-1	Jong FC Utrecht	Helmond
20:00	Jordy Thomassen 27'	Report	Maarten Peijnenburg 90'	Stadium: GS Staalwerken Stadion; Attendance: 1,028

3 March 2017 Week 28	RKC Waalwijk	5-2	Helmond Sport	Waalwijk
20:00	Fred Benson 40'; Daan Rienstra 71'; Johan Voskamp 74'; Pieter Langedijk 77' 89' (pen.)	Report	Teije ten Den 30' 54'	Stadium: Mandemakers Stadion; Attendance: 1,996

10 March 2017 Week 29	FC Volendam	1-0	Helmond Sport	Volendam
20:00	Enzo Stroo 70'	Report		Stadium: Kras Stadion; Attendance: 4,446

13 March 2017 Week 30	Helmond Sport	0-2	De Graafschap	Helmond
20:00		Report	Bryan Smeets 7'; Anthony van den Hurk 42'	Stadium: GS Staalwerken Stadion; Attendance: 1,011

17 March 2017 Week 31	Jong PSV	3-0	Helmond Sport	Eindhoven
20:00	Albert Gudmundsson 13'; Sam Lammers 19'; Joël Piroe 24'	Report		Stadium: PSV Campus De Herdgang; Attendance: 1,200

31 March 2017 Week 32	Helmond Sport	1-0	FC Dordrecht	Helmond
20:00	Teije ten Den 69'	Report		Stadium: GS Staalwerken Stadion; Attendance: 1,873

7 April 2017 Week 33	Fortuna Sittard	4-1	Helmond Sport	Sittard
20:00	Djibril Dianessy 9'; Finn Stokkers 25'; Christopher Braun 47'; Emrah Bassan 87'	Report	Giovanni Hiwat 84'	Stadium: Fortuna Sittard Stadion; Attendance: 1,623

14 April 2017 Week 34	Helmond Sport	2-1	NAC Breda	Helmond
20:00	Steven Edwards 39'; Teije ten Den 60'	Report	Cyriel Dessers 79'	Stadium: GS Staalwerken Stadion; Attendance: 2,211

17 April 2017 Week 35	Helmond Sport	2-0	FC Den Bosch	Helmond
14:30	Giovanni Hiwat 28'; Teije ten Den 41'	Report		Stadium: GS Staalwerken Stadion; Attendance: 1,471

21 April 2017 Week 36	Jong Ajax	2-0	Helmond Sport	Duivendrecht
20:00	Abdelhak Nouri 19'; Pelle Clement 39'	Report		Stadium: Sportpark De Toekomst; Attendance: 500

28 April 2017 Week 37	Helmond Sport	1-1	Almere City FC	Helmond
20:00	Robert Braber 90+1'	Report	Rick ten Voorde 28'	Stadium: GS Staalwerken Stadion; Attendance: 1,533

5 May 2017 Week 38	FC Eindhoven	2-2	Helmond Sport	Eindhoven
20:00	Leonardo 26'; Jari Vandeputte 38'	Report	Jordy Thomassen 13'; Gillian Justiana 85'	Stadium: Jan Louwers Stadion; Attendance: 3,620

==== Promotion/relegation play-offs Eredivisie and Eerste Divisie ====
8 May 2017 1st round 1st match	Helmond Sport	4-2	Almere City FC	Helmond
20:00	Teije ten Den 71'; Robert Braber 74'; Jordy Thomassen 81'; Steven Edwards 90' (pen.)	Report	Gaston Salasiwa 28'; Rick ten Voorde 69'	Stadium: GS Staalwerken Stadion; Attendance: 2,031

12 May 2017 1st round 2nd match	Almere City FC	0-2	Helmond Sport	Almere
20:45		Report	Jordy Thomassen 40'; Teije ten Den 43'	Stadium: Yanmar Stadion; Attendance: 1,420

Helmond Sport won 6–2 on aggregate.

18 May 2017 2nd round 1st match	Helmond Sport	0-1	Roda JC Kerkrade	Helmond
18:30		Report	Dani Schahin 52'	Stadium: GS Staalwerken Stadion; Attendance: 3,431

21 May 2017 2nd round 2nd match	Roda JC Kerkrade	1-1	Helmond Sport	Kerkrade
12:30	Gyliano van Velzen 90'	Report	Furhgill Zeldenrust 50'	Stadium: Parkstad Limburg Stadion; Attendance: 12,449

Roda JC Kerkrade won 2–1 on aggregate.

== Statistics ==
=== Scorers ===
#	Player	Eerste Divisie
1	(Netherlands) Jordy Thomassen	15
2	(Netherlands) Teije ten Den	12
3	(Netherlands) Furhgill Zeldenrust	7
4	(Netherlands) Steven Edwards	5
5	(Netherlands) Giovanni Hiwat	4
5	(Netherlands) Robert Braber	4
7	(Curaçao) Gillian Justiana	3
7	(Netherlands) Marc Höcher	3
9	(Belgium) Jason Bourdouxhe	2
10	(Netherlands) Maikel Verkoelen	1
10	(Netherlands) Robert van Koesveld	1

=== Appearances ===
#	Player	Eerste Divisie	KNVB	Total
1	(Netherlands) Jordy Thomassen	41	1	42
2	(Netherlands) Steven Edwards	40	1	41
3	(Netherlands) Furhgill Zeldenrust	38	1	39
3	(Netherlands) Stephen Warmolts	38	1	39
5	(Netherlands) Teije ten Den	37	1	38
6	(Curaçao) Gillian Justiana	36	1	37
6	(Netherlands) Robert Braber	36	1	37
8	(Netherlands) Giovanni Hiwat	33	1	34
9	(Netherlands) Jeroen Verkennis	32	1	33
10	(Belgium) Ferhat Kaya	31	1	32
11	(Netherlands) Robert van Koesveld	29	0	29
12	(Belgium) Jason Bourdouxhe	25	1	26
13	(Netherlands) Maikel Verkoelen	24	1	25
13	(Netherlands) Ron Janzen	25	0	25
15	(Netherlands) Marc Höcher	23	0	23
16	(Netherlands) Yaël Eisden	17	0	17
17	(Netherlands) Stijn van Gassel	11	0	11
18	(Netherlands) Sam Strijbosch	8	0	8
18	(Germany) Shpend Hasani	8	0	8
20	(Netherlands) Joey Godee	6	1	7
21	(Netherlands) Max de Boom	6	0	6
22	(Curaçao) Maiky Fecunda	5	0	5
22	(Netherlands) Marijn van Heugten	5	0	5
24	(Belgium) Seppe Brulmans	3	1	4
25	(Netherlands) Nick de Louw	2	0	2
26	(Netherlands) Wietse van Lankveld	1	0	1

=== Clean sheets ===
#	Player	Eerste Divisie
1	(Belgium) Ferhat Kaya	6
2	(Netherlands) Stijn van Gassel	2
Total		8

=== Disciplinary record ===
#	Player	Eerste Divisie		KNVB		Total	
#	Player	Booked	Sent off (straight red)	Booked	Sent off (straight red)	Booked	Sent off (straight red)
1	(Netherlands) Stephen Warmolts	4	1	0	0	4	1
2	(Curaçao) Gillian Justiana	8	0	0	0	8	0
3	(Netherlands) Steven Edwards	7	0	0	0	7	0
4	(Netherlands) Jordy Thomassen	5	0	1	0	6	0
4	(Netherlands) Maikel Verkoelen	6	0	0	0	6	0
4	(Netherlands) Robert Braber	6	0	0	0	6	0
7	(Netherlands) Ron Janzen	5	0	0	0	5	0
8	(Netherlands) Giovanni Hiwat	4	0	0	0	4	0
8	(Netherlands) Jeroen Verkennis	4	0	0	0	4	0
8	(Netherlands) Robert van Koesveld	4	0	0	0	4	0
8	(Netherlands) Teije ten Den	4	0	0	0	4	0
12	(Belgium) Ferhat Kaya	2	0	0	0	2	0
12	(Belgium) Jason Bourdouxhe	2	0	0	0	2	0
12	(Curaçao) Maiky Fecunda	2	0	0	0	2	0
12	(Netherlands) Marc Höcher	2	0	0	0	2	0
16	(Netherlands) Max de Boom	1	0	0	0	1	0
16	(Belgium) Seppe Brulmans	1	0	0	0	1	0
