= 2016–17 Eerste Divisie =

61st season of the second-tier football league in Netherlands

Eerste Divisie
- Season: 2016–17
- Champions: VVV-Venlo
- Promoted: VVV-Venlo; NAC Breda
- Relegated: Achilles '29
- Matches: 380
- Goals: 1,210 (3.18 per match)
- Top goalscorer: Tom Boere (33 goals)
- Biggest home win: Jong Ajax 7–0 Oss (26 September 2016); VVV-Venlo 7–0 Helmond Sport (10 February 2017)
- Biggest away win: Achilles '29 0–6 Volendam (9 December 2016)
- Highest scoring: Jong PSV 5–4 Den Bosch (8 August 2016); Telstar 3–6 Almere City (18 November 2016); Jong Ajax 6–3 Almere City (30 January 2017); Oss 2–7 Cambuur (13 March 2017)

The 2016–17 Eerste Divisie, known as Jupiler League for sponsorship reasons, was the sixty-first season of Eerste Divisie since its establishment in 1955. It began in August 2016 with the first matches of the season and ended in May 2017 with the finals of the promotion/relegation play-offs, also involving the 16th- and 17th-placed teams from the 2016–17 Eredivisie. The fixtures were announced on 14 June 2016.

== Teams ==
A total of 20 teams are taking part in the league. 2015–16 Eerste Divisie champion Sparta Rotterdam gained promotion to the Eredivisie, and was replaced by Cambuur, that finished last in the 2015–16 Eredivisie. Go Ahead Eagles won the post-season playoff, and are replaced in the 2016–17 Eerste Divisie by De Graafschap. Achilles '29 was relegated, and Jong FC Utrecht joined the league.

Location of teams in the Eerste Divisie 2016–17

Club	Location	Venue	Capacity
Achilles '29	Groesbeek	Sportpark De Heikant	4,500
Jong Ajax	Amsterdam	Sportpark De Toekomst	4,000
Almere City	Almere	Yanmar Stadion	3,000
Cambuur	Leeuwarden	Cambuur Stadion	10,500
De Graafschap	Doetinchem	De Vijverberg	12,600
Den Bosch	's-Hertogenbosch	De Vliert	9,000
Dordrecht	Dordrecht	GN Bouw Stadion	4,088
Eindhoven	Eindhoven	Jan Louwers Stadion	4,600
Emmen	Emmen	De JENS Vesting	8,600
Fortuna Sittard	Sittard	Fortuna Sittard Stadion	12,500
Helmond Sport	Helmond	Lavans Stadion	4,100
MVV	Maastricht	De Geusselt	10,000
NAC Breda	Breda	Rat Verlegh Stadion	19,000
Oss	Oss	Frans Heesenstadion	4,700
Jong PSV	Eindhoven	De Herdgang	2,500
RKC Waalwijk	Waalwijk	Mandemakers Stadion	7,508
Telstar	Velsen	Rabobank IJmond Stadion	3,625
Jong FC Utrecht	Utrecht	Sportcomplex Zoudenbalch	450
Volendam	Volendam	Kras Stadion	6,260
VVV-Venlo	Venlo	Seacon Stadion – De Koel	8,000

=== Personnel and kits ===
Club	Manager	Kit manufacturer	Sponsors
Achilles '29	(Netherlands) Eric Meijers	Klupp	Van Helden Relatiegeschenken
Jong Ajax	(Netherlands) Marcel Keizer	Adidas	Ziggo
Almere City	(Netherlands) Jack de Gier	Adidas	Van Wijnen
Cambuur	(Netherlands) Rob Maas	Nike	Bouwgroep Dijkstra Draisma
De Graafschap	(Netherlands) Henk de Jong	Nike	ATAG
Den Bosch	(Netherlands) Wiljan Vloet	Macron	Van Wanrooij
Dordrecht	(Netherlands) Gérard de Nooijer	Macron	Riwal Hoogwerkers
Eindhoven	(Netherlands) Ricardo Moniz	Joma	VDL Groep
Emmen	(Netherlands) Gert Heerkes	Robey	Q&S Gartendeco
Fortuna Sittard	(Netherlands) Ben van Dael	Givova	Fitland
Helmond Sport	(Netherlands) Remond Strijbosch	Hummel	Vescom
MVV	(Netherlands) Ron Elsen	Masita	Drink Water
NAC	(Belgium) Stijn Vreven	Legea	cm. Payments
Oss	(Netherlands) François Gesthuizen	Erima	NGSN
Jong PSV	(Netherlands) Pascal Jansen	Umbro	Philips
RKC Waalwijk	(Netherlands) Peter van den Berg	Hummel	Mandemakers Keukens
Telstar	(Netherlands) Michel Vonk	Hummel	MPM Oil
Jong FC Utrecht	(Netherlands) Robin Pronk	Hummel	Zorg van de Zaak
Volendam	(Netherlands) Robert Molenaar	Jako	HSB
VVV-Venlo	(Netherlands) Maurice Steijn	Masita	Seacon Logistics

== Standings ==
Pos	Team	Pld	W	D	L	GF	GA	GD	Pts	Promotion, qualification or relegation
1	VVV-Venlo (C, P)	38	25	5	8	75	35	+40	80	Promotion to the Eredivisie
2	Jong Ajax (Note: Reserves teams cannot be promoted and cannot participate in the promotion play-offs.)	38	23	7	8	93	54	+39	76	
3	Cambuur	38	22	5	11	78	42	+36	71	Qualification to promotion play-offs Second round (Note: Ten teams, two from the Eredivisie and eight from the Eerste Divisie, play for two spots in the 2017–18 Eredivisie, the remaining eight teams play in the 2017–18 Eerste Divisie. The season is subdivided in periods consisting of games 1–9, 10–18, 19–27 and 28–36. The top finisher in each period (that has not won a previous period) is a period winner and qualifies for the promotion play-offs first round even if they finish the season outside of the top nine.)
4	Jong PSV	38	20	9	9	66	35	+31	69	
5	NAC Breda (O, P)	38	19	7	12	65	50	+15	64	Qualification to promotion play-offs Second round
6	Volendam	38	17	11	10	63	44	+19	62	Qualification to promotion play-offs Second round
7	MVV	38	15	14	9	55	45	+10	59	Qualification to promotion play-offs Second round
8	Almere City	38	17	8	13	74	66	+8	59	Qualification to promotion play-offs First round
9	Emmen	38	14	13	11	50	40	+10	55	Qualification to promotion play-offs First round
10	RKC Waalwijk	38	15	9	14	62	70	−8	54	Qualification to promotion play-offs First round
11	Eindhoven	38	15	8	15	64	71	−7	53	
12	De Graafschap	38	15	5	18	70	63	+7	50	
13	Helmond Sport	38	14	7	17	51	67	−16	49	Qualification to promotion play-offs First round
14	Den Bosch	38	12	9	17	48	67	−19	45	
15	Oss	38	12	5	21	67	95	−28	41	
16	Telstar	38	10	10	18	46	64	−18	40	
17	Fortuna Sittard (Note: Fortuna Sittard were deducted three points for an outstanding bill owed to KNVB. On 10 April 2017 Fortuna Sittard were deducted another 6 points for not meeting financial targets.)	38	13	9	16	54	67	−13	39	
18	Jong FC Utrecht	38	10	7	21	50	71	−21	37	
19	Dordrecht	38	5	9	24	42	72	−30	24	
20	Achilles '29 (Note: Achilles '29 were deducted three points for repeatedly not meeting financial requirements.) (R)	38	5	7	26	37	92	−55	19	Relegation to the Tweede Divisie

Source: NUsport (in Dutch), Soccerway
Rules for classification: 1) points; 2) goal difference; 3) number of goals scored
(C) Champions; (O) Play-off winners; (P) Promoted; (R) Relegated

== Period Tables ==
=== Period 1 ===
Pos	Team	Pld	W	D	L	GF	GA	GD	Pts	Qualification
1	Jong PSV	9	6	3	0	19	10	+9	21	Reserves teams cannot participate in the promotion play-offs
2	VVV-Venlo	9	6	0	3	15	7	+8	18	Qualification to promotion play-offs Second round
3	Volendam	9	5	2	2	15	8	+7	17	
4	NAC Breda	9	5	2	2	16	10	+6	17	
5	MVV	9	5	2	2	16	11	+5	17	
6	Jong Ajax	9	5	1	3	29	12	+17	16	Reserves teams cannot participate in the promotion play-offs
7	Emmen	9	4	2	3	11	9	+2	14	
8	Fortuna Sittard	9	4	2	3	14	15	−1	14	
9	Telstar	9	4	2	3	12	13	−1	14	
10	Almere City	9	4	1	4	17	17	0	13	
11	Eindhoven	9	4	1	4	14	20	−6	13	
12	RKC Waalwijk	9	3	3	3	13	13	0	12	
13	Cambuur	9	3	2	4	12	12	0	11	
14	Helmond Sport	9	3	2	4	12	15	−3	11	
15	De Graafschap	9	3	1	5	15	13	+2	10	
16	Dordrecht	9	2	3	4	12	14	−2	9	
17	Jong FC Utrecht	9	2	2	5	10	17	−7	8	Reserves teams cannot participate in the promotion play-offs
18	Den Bosch	9	2	2	5	13	24	−11	8	
19	Oss	9	2	1	6	13	23	−10	7	
20	Achilles '29	9	1	0	8	10	25	−15	3	

Source: Jupiler League
Rules for classification: 1) points; 2) goal difference; 3) number of goals scored

=== Period 2 ===
Pos	Team	Pld	W	D	L	GF	GA	GD	Pts	Qualification
1	VVV-Venlo	9	6	2	1	19	6	+13	20	Period 1 winner
2	Helmond Sport	9	6	2	1	16	5	+11	20	Qualification to promotion play-offs Second round
3	Jong Ajax	9	6	2	1	17	12	+5	20	Reserves teams cannot participate in the promotion play-offs
4	Almere City	9	6	1	2	21	12	+9	19	
5	MVV	9	6	1	2	15	9	+6	19	
6	Cambuur	9	6	0	3	19	14	+5	18	
7	Oss	9	5	1	3	27	24	+3	16	
8	Eindhoven	9	5	1	3	16	13	+3	16	
9	RKC Waalwijk	9	5	1	3	15	16	−1	16	
10	Volendam	9	4	3	2	16	8	+8	15	
11	Den Bosch	9	4	2	3	12	13	−1	14	
12	Emmen	9	3	3	3	11	9	+2	12	
13	NAC Breda	9	3	2	4	14	18	−4	11	
14	Jong PSV	9	3	1	5	11	9	+2	10	Reserves teams cannot participate in the promotion play-offs
15	Telstar	9	1	4	4	8	14	−6	7	
16	Jong FC Utrecht	9	1	3	5	13	18	−5	6	Reserves teams cannot participate in the promotion play-offs
17	De Graafschap	9	1	2	6	14	19	−5	5	
18	Fortuna Sittard	9	1	1	7	7	20	−13	4	
19	Dordrecht	9	0	2	7	8	21	−13	2	
20	Achilles '29	9	0	2	7	3	22	−19	2	

Source: Jupiler League
Rules for classification: 1) points; 2) goal difference; 3) number of goals scored

=== Period 3 ===
Pos	Team	Pld	W	D	L	GF	GA	GD	Pts	Qualification
1	VVV-Venlo	9	8	0	1	25	4	+21	24	Period 1 winner
2	Jong Ajax (Note: Ajax as reserves team cannot participate in the promotion play-off, therefore period 3 winner will be highest ranked team at end of season)	9	5	3	1	23	16	+7	18	Reserves teams cannot participate in the promotion play-offs
3	Jong PSV	9	5	3	1	14	7	+7	18	Reserves teams cannot participate in the promotion play-offs
4	Cambuur	9	5	2	2	16	8	+8	17	
5	Volendam	9	5	1	3	16	12	+4	16	
6	NAC Breda	9	5	1	3	13	9	+4	16	
7	Fortuna Sittard	9	4	3	2	17	15	+2	15	
8	Emmen	9	3	3	3	14	13	+1	12	
9	De Graafschap	9	4	0	5	16	16	0	12	
10	Eindhoven	9	3	2	4	15	13	+2	11	
11	Den Bosch	9	3	2	4	13	11	+2	11	
12	MVV	9	2	5	2	8	8	0	11	
13	Telstar	9	3	2	4	13	15	−2	11	
14	Almere City	9	3	2	4	18	22	−4	11	
15	RKC Waalwijk	9	3	2	4	15	19	−4	11	
16	Jong FC Utrecht	9	3	1	5	11	20	−9	10	Reserves teams cannot participate in the promotion play-offs
17	Oss	9	2	2	5	13	22	−9	8	
18	Dordrecht	9	2	1	6	13	18	−5	7	
19	Helmond Sport	9	2	1	6	12	26	−14	7	Period 2 winner
20	Achilles '29	9	1	2	6	8	19	−11	5	

Source: Jupiler League
Rules for classification: 1) points; 2) goal difference; 3) number of goals scored

=== Period 4 ===
Pos	Team	Pld	W	D	L	GF	GA	GD	Pts	Qualification
1	Cambuur	9	7	1	1	26	5	+21	22	Qualification to promotion play-offs Second round
2	De Graafschap	9	7	1	1	21	10	+11	22	
3	Jong Ajax	9	5	1	3	18	12	+6	16	Reserves teams cannot participate in the promotion play-offs
4	Almere City	9	4	3	2	17	12	+5	15	
5	VVV-Venlo	9	4	3	2	13	13	0	15	Period 1 winner
6	Jong PSV	9	4	2	3	16	8	+8	14	Reserves teams cannot participate in the promotion play-offs
7	NAC Breda	9	4	2	3	16	12	+4	14	
8	Emmen	9	3	5	1	10	6	+4	14	
9	Fortuna Sittard	9	3	3	3	13	14	−1	12	
10	Eindhoven	9	3	3	3	16	19	−3	12	
11	MVV	9	2	5	2	14	13	+1	11	
12	Volendam	9	2	5	2	13	12	+1	11	
13	RKC Waalwijk	9	3	2	4	15	21	−6	11	
14	Achilles '29	9	3	2	4	12	18	−6	11	
15	Den Bosch	9	2	3	4	9	14	−5	9	
16	Helmond Sport	9	3	0	6	8	18	−10	9	Period 2 winner
17	Telstar	9	2	2	5	12	19	−7	8	
18	Jong FC Utrecht	9	2	1	6	8	16	−8	7	Reserves teams cannot participate in the promotion play-offs
19	Oss	9	2	1	6	11	21	−10	7	
20	Dordrecht	9	1	3	5	9	14	−5	6	

Source: Jupiler League
Rules for classification: 1) points; 2) goal difference; 3) number of goals scored

== Results ==
Home \ Away	ACH	ALM	CAM	GRA	DBO	DOR	EIN	EMM	FOR	HEL	JAJ	JPS	JUT	MVV	NAC	OSS	RKC	TEL	VOL	VVV
Achilles '29		3–3	0–3	0–0	2–1	2–2	4–3	0–4	0–1	1–2	2–3	1–5	1–1	2–3	1–2	1–2	2–3	1–2	0–6	0–3
Almere City	1–0		0–1	1–2	4–1	3–0	4–0	3–1	2–0	1–0	1–4	1–0	2–1	2–1	0–2	3–3	6–2	2–0	2–2	0–2
Cambuur	3–1	4–1		1–1	0–1	3–0	4–1	1–0	1–1	3–0	1–3	1–1	4–2	4–0	3–1	4–2	5–0	5–1	2–1	0–2
De Graafschap	3–3	4–1	3–0		0–3	2–3	4–1	3–0	5–0	2–4	3–2	2–1	3–1	2–0	2–1	3–5	4–0	2–1	1–1	0–2
Den Bosch	2–1	1–3	3–1	2–1		1–0	0–2	1–1	1–1	1–1	1–2	0–0	1–0	2–1	2–1	2–1	1–1	0–0	2–5	0–2
Dordrecht	3–0	1–4	0–1	0–3	2–2		1–1	0–4	2–2	1–4	0–2	2–3	3–0	0–1	1–2	1–1	1–1	0–2	1–0	5–2
Eindhoven	2–1	4–1	2–0	2–1	4–2	2–1		0–1	3–1	2–2	2–1	0–5	2–1	1–1	6–2	1–2	3–0	4–2	0–1	0–0
Emmen	1–0	2–0	0–1	2–0	3–0	2–1	2–0		2–3	1–2	0–0	1–1	0–3	0–0	0–0	2–0	1–0	0–0	3–1	1–2
Fortuna Sittard	2–1	2–1	3–0	3–2	0–4	3–2	1–1	2–2		4–1	5–2	0–0	4–1	2–3	0–2	2–0	0–1	1–1	3–0	2–0
Helmond Sport	1–2	1–1	1–0	0–2	2–0	1–0	3–0	1–3	1–0		2–4	1–0	1–1	2–2	2–1	3–1	1–1	3–4	2–0	2–1
Jong Ajax	7–1	6–3	2–1	4–2	5–2	1–0	1–1	1–1	2–1	2–0		1–0	2–0	1–1	2–1	7–0	4–1	2–1	1–1	0–4
Jong PSV	4–0	0–1	0–2	1–0	5–4	3–2	4–1	1–0	3–0	3–0	3–1		2–0	0–0	2–0	2–4	4–1	1–0	2–0	2–1
Jong FC Utrecht	0–1	1–1	0–2	3–2	5–0	1–1	3–1	3–1	3–0	1–0	2–2	0–2		1–2	0–2	2–1	1–3	2–1	2–4	0–0
MVV	0–0	2–2	2–1	2–0	3–0	2–1	0–0	2–2	1–1	2–0	1–0	2–2	4–1		1–1	3–0	1–1	2–1	1–2	1–2
NAC Breda	2–0	3–1	0–2	1–0	0–0	1–0	3–3	3–1	3–1	0–0	4–3	1–1	4–1	1–2		4–1	2–3	1–0	1–0	0–0
Oss	4–0	2–3	2–7	2–1	1–1	4–2	6–2	2–2	3–1	3–1	0–3	2–0	4–2	0–3	3–4		2–5	0–2	2–2	0–3
RKC Waalwijk	2–0	1–1	2–2	2–1	0–2	2–1	1–2	1–1	3–0	5–2	3–2	1–1	1–2	2–0	2–4	3–0		1–0	1–4	1–2
Telstar	1–1	3–6	0–3	2–1	2–0	0–0	1–4	2–2	1–1	4–2	1–3	0–0	3–1	1–1	2–0	3–1	0–4		0–1	1–2
Volendam	1–2	1–1	1–1	2–2	2–1	1–1	3–1	0–1	3–0	1–0	1–1	1–0	2–2	3–1	2–1	3–1	1–1	3–0		0–1
VVV-Venlo	4–0	3–2	2–1	4–1	3–1	3–1	1–0	0–0	4–1	7–0	1–4	1–2	2–0	2–1	0–4	2–0	4–0	1–1	0–1	

Updated to match(es) played on unknown. Source: Jupiler League
Legend: Blue = home team win; Yellow = draw; Red = away team win.

== Promotion/relegation play-offs Eredivisie and Eerste Divisie ==
The numbers 16 and 17 from the 2016–17 Eredivisie, 4 (substitute) period winners of the 2016–17 Eerste Divisie, as well as the 4 otherwise highest ranked teams of the 2016–17 Eerste Divisie, making a total of 10 teams, decide in a 3-round knockout system which 2 teams will play next season in the 2017–18 Eredivisie. The remaining 8 teams will play next season in the 2017–18 Eerste Divisie. Reserves teams are excluded from participating.

=== Qualified Teams ===
Club	Qualification
NEC	16th in the Eredivisie
Roda JC	17th in the Eredivisie
NAC Breda	5th in the Eerste Divisie (First and Third Period won by the league champions)
Helmond Sport	Winner of the Second Period in the Eerste Divisie
Volendam	6th in the Eerste Divisie (First and Third Period won by the league champions)
Cambuur	Winner of the Fourth Period in the Eerste Divisie
MVV	7th in the Eerste Divisie
Almere City	8th in the Eerste Divisie
Emmen	9th in the Eerste Divisie
RKC Waalwijk	10th in the Eerste Divisie

=== Results ===
First round
A
Helmond Sport	4	2	6
Almere City	2	0	2
B
RKC	1	1	2
Emmen	5	0	5

Second round
C
MVV	1	2	3
Cambuur	1	1	2
D
Helmond Sport	0	1	1
Roda JC	1	1	2
E
Volendam	2	0	2
NAC	2	2	4
F
Emmen	1	0	1
NEC	3	1	4

Final round
G
MVV	0	0	0
Roda JC *	0	1	1
H
NAC **	1	4	5
NEC	0	1	1

* Succeeded to remain in the Eredivisie
** Promoted to the Eredivisie

=== First round ===
==== Match A ====
8 May 2017 First leg	Helmond Sport	4 – 2	Almere City	Helmond
	ten Den 71'; Braber 74'; Thomassen 81'; Edwards 90' (pen.)		Salasiwa 28' ten Voorde 69'	Stadium: Lavans Stadion; Attendance: 2,031; Referee: Jeroen Manschot

12 May 2017 Second leg	Almere City	0 – 2 (6 – 2 agg.)	Helmond Sport	Almere
			Thomassen 40' ten Den 43'	Stadium: Yanmar Stadion; Attendance: 1,420; Referee: Allard Lindhout

==== Match B ====
8 May 2017 First leg	RKC	1 – 5	Emmen	Waalwijk
	Voskamp 84'		Loen 11'; Kallon 22'; Bannink 49'; Olijve 55'; Huisman 80'	Stadium: Mandemakers Stadion; Attendance: 4,223; Referee: Christiaan Bax

12 May 2017 Second leg	Emmen	0 – 1 (2 – 5 agg.)	RKC	Emmen
			Voskamp 31'	Stadium: De JENS Vesting; Attendance: 2,856; Referee: Edwin van de Graaf

=== Second round ===
==== Match C ====
18 May 2017 First leg	MVV	1 – 1	Cambuur	Maastricht
	Nwakali 8'		van de Streek 17'	Stadium: De Geusselt; Attendance: 5,642; Referee: Christian Mulder

21 May 2017 Second leg	Cambuur	1 – 2 (3 – 2 agg.)	MVV	Leeuwarden
	Barto 58'		Pereira 80'; Verheydt 90+3'	Stadium: Cambuur Stadion; Attendance: 9,640; Referee: Jochem Kamphuis

==== Match D ====
18 May 2017 First leg	Helmond Sport	0 – 1	Roda JC	Helmond
			Schahin 52'	Stadium: Lavans Stadion; Attendance: 3,431; Referee: Martin van den Kerkhof

21 May 2017 Second leg	Roda JC	1 – 1 (1 – 2 agg.)	Helmond Sport	Kerkrade
	van Velzen 90'		Zeldenrust 50'	Stadium: Parkstad Limburg Stadion; Attendance: 12,449; Referee: Siemen Mulder

==== Match E ====
18 May 2017 First leg	Volendam	2 – 2	NAC	Volendam
	van Son 64'; Runderkamp 85'		Agyepong 61'; Dessers 89'	Stadium: Kras Stadion; Attendance: 3,687; Referee: Edwin van de Graaf

21 May 2017 Second leg	NAC	2 – 0 (2 – 4 agg.)	Volendam	Breda
	Dessers 6', 24'			Stadium: Rat Verlegh Stadion; Attendance: 16,554; Referee: Ed Janssen

==== Match F ====
18 May 2017 First leg	Emmen	1 – 3	NEC	Emmen
	Bannink 4'		Breinburg 54'; Grot 68'; Awoniyi 88'	Stadium: De JENS Vesting; Attendance: 4,969; Referee: Allard Lindhout

21 May 2017 Second leg	NEC	1 – 0 (1 – 4 agg.)	Emmen	Nijmegen
	Mayi 26'			Stadium: Stadion de Goffert; Attendance: 9,500; Referee: Bas Nijhuis

=== Final round ===
==== Match G ====
25 May 2017 First leg	MVV	0 – 0	Roda JC	Maastricht
				Stadium: De Geusselt; Attendance: 8,800; Referee: Pol van Boekel

28 May 2017 Second leg	Roda JC	1 – 0 (0 – 1 agg.)	MVV	Kerkrade
	Werker 26'			Stadium: Parkstad Limburg Stadion; Attendance: 16,019; Referee: Ed Janssen

==== Match H ====
25 May 2017 First leg	NAC	1 – 0	NEC	Breda
	Dessers 84'			Stadium: Rat Verlegh Stadion; Attendance: 19,000; Referee: Dennis Higler

28 May 2017 Second leg	NEC	1 – 4 (5 – 1 agg.)	NAC	Nijmegen
	Breinburg 32' (pen.)		Dessers 7' (pen.), 52', 74'; Korte 71'	Stadium: Stadion de Goffert; Attendance: 12,500; Referee: Kevin Blom

== Number of teams by provinces ==
Number of teams	Province	Team(s)
7	North Brabant	Den Bosch, Eindhoven, Helmond Sport, NAC Breda, Oss, Jong PSV and RKC Waalwijk
3	Limburg	Fortuna Sittard, MVV and VVV-Venlo
3	North Holland	Jong Ajax, Telstar and Volendam
2	Gelderland	Achilles '29 and De Graafschap
1	Drenthe	Emmen
1	Flevoland	Almere City
1	Friesland	Cambuur
1	South Holland	Dordrecht
1	Utrecht	Jong FC Utrecht

== Attendances ==
	A29	ALM	CAM	BOS	DOR	EIN	EMM	FOR	GRA	HEL	JAJ	JPS	JUT	MVV	NAC	OSS	RKC	TEL	VOL	VVV	Total	Average
Achilles '29		1.333	1.185	1.235	2.322	1.243	1.220	800	2.320	1.000	2.133	1.943	1.220	1.262	2.919	1.430	1.533	1.432	1.220	1.640	29.390	1.547
Almere City FC	1.530		1.807	1.357	1.430	1.359	1.589	1.486	2.130	1.576	1.839	1.662	2.388	1.546	1.953	1.964	1.837	2.150	1.538	2.276	33.417	1.759
SC Cambuur	6.872	7.032		7.368	7.197	8.388	7.735	7.133	7.206	8.083	8.321	7.042	7.084	7.511	7.258	7.021	9.142	7.610	7.250	7.420	142.673	7.509
FC Den Bosch	1.589	2.373	2.479		3.687	2.741	2.268	2.173	2.953	3.567	3.579	2.987	2.572	2.782	3.494	2.641	3.452	2.296	2.573	2.058	52.264	2.751
FC Dordrecht	1.434	1.983	1.742	1.238		1.156	1.525	1.135	1.638	1.641	1.425	1.303	1.133	1.123	2.106	1.952	1.684	1.226	2.492	1.109	29.045	1.529
FC Eindhoven	1.960	2.423	2.645	3.513	3.076		2.413	2.871	2.836	3.620	3.125	3.156	2.338	1.865	3.055	2.826	2.833	2.018	1.703	3.496	51.772	2.725
FC Emmen	2.468	3.450	3.710	3.423	3.644	3.014		2.113	2.630	3.244	3.150	2.580	3.608	2.115	2.850	2.280	2.740	3.212	2.630	2.866	55.727	2.933
Fortuna Sittard	1.541	1.806	1.837	1.120	1.776	1.143	1.721		1.512	1.623	1.549	1.680	1.734	4.780	1.290	1.875	2.440	1.444	1.560	2.450	34.881	1.836
De Graafschap	10.033	8.364	8.064	8.416	8.304	7.463	8.324	11.312		0	10.043	9.311	8.514	10.623	9.124	8.602	10.110	8.714	8.394	8.230	161.945	8.523
Helmond Sport	1.621	1.533	1.331	1.471	1.873	3.195	1.516	2.382	1.011		2.491	2.578	1.028	2.013	2.211	1.231	1.812	1.286	2.562	2.397	35.542	1.871
Jong Ajax	528	772	616	462	500	744	1.098	653	2.068	500		2.152	675	514	1.721	848	650	683	1.007	1.183	17.374	914
Jong PSV	363	463	419	600	475	650	350	250	543	604	1.634		700	549	641	550	407	520	491	950	11.159	587
Jong FC Utrecht	500	741	791	881	1.181	654	387	891	829	874	1.423	503		556	1.612	604	1.019	915	770	771	15.902	836
MVV Maastricht	4.031	3.997	4.427	5.504	4.754	4.681	4.370	7.004	4.821	4.188	4.767	4.290	3.782		4.977	4.013	4.402	4.380	5.012	4.704	88.104	4.637
NAC Breda	12.335	13.211	14.285	12.058	11.456	13.821	12.065	14.070	14.016	10.435	15.054	14.865	12.285	12.556		13.148	13.826	12.283	13.805	16.753	252.327	13.280
FC Oss	2.221	1.975	921	2.889	2.012	1.915	1.759	1.996	2.278	1.900	3.004	2.756	3.267	1.087	2.009		2.066	1.989	1.512	2.225	39.781	2.094
RKC Waalwijk	2.250	1.540	1.800	2.900	2.267	2.100	2.268	1.738	2.100	1.996	2.450	2.275	1.444	1.407	3.442	2.131		2.100	2.756	3.089	42.053	2.213
Telstar	1.499	1.903	1.563	2.222	1.701	1.963	1.263	1.763	2.363	1.299	2.963	2.323	1.444	2.017	2.601	1.850	1.001		2.275	1.663	35.676	1.878
FC Volendam	4.301	3.525	5.269	4.075	4.248	4.155	2.871	4.094	4.475	4.446	6.345	4.058	2.952	3.295	3.657	4.207	5.066	2.718		4.582	78.339	4.123
VVV-Venlo	4.411	5.183	4.422	4.612	4.227	4.722	7.803	6.123	5.105	5.011	6.379	4.277	3.813	8.000	6.634	3.911	4.239	4.621	4.356		97.849	5.150
Totaal	61.487	63.607	59.313	65.344	66.130	65.107	62.545	69.987	62.834	55.607	81.674	71.741	61.981	65.601	63.554	63.084	70.259	61.597	63.906	69.862	1.306.220	3.437
