= Kai Huisman =

Dutch footballer

Personal information
- Date of birth: 27 March 1995 (age 31)
- Place of birth: Ede, Netherlands
- Height: 1.77 m (5 ft 10 in)
- Position: Forward

Youth career
- Blauw Geel '55
- –2007: KSV Fortissimo
- 2007–2016: Vitesse

Senior career*
Years	Team	Apps	(Gls)
2016–2017	Emmen	18	(1)
2017–2018	Heracles	1	(0)
2019–2021	DOVO		
2021–2022	GVVV	10	(1)
2022–2024	Bennekom		

International career
2011	Netherlands U17	3	(0)
- * Club domestic league appearances and goals as of 01:02, 23 November 2019 (UTC)

Kai Huisman (born 27 March 1995) is a Dutch retired professional footballer who played as a forward.

== Club career ==
=== FC Emmen ===
Huisman joined Eerste Divisie side FC Emmen after his contract with Vitesse expired. Huisman also had spells with amateur sides VV Blauw Geel '55 and KSV Fortissimo prior to his nine-year spell with Vitesse. Whilst with Vitesse, he also represented Netherlands at under-17 level in 2011. On 19 August 2016, Huisman went on to make his professional debut in a 1–0 away defeat against Jong PSV, in which he replaced Frank Olijve with thirteen minutes remaining.

=== Heracles Almelo ===
On 14 September 2017, Huisman joined Eredivisie side Heracles Almelo on a one-year deal.

=== Later clubs ===
In July 2019, Huisman joined Derde Divisie club DOVO. In February 2021, while still playing for DOVO, it was confirmed that Huisman would join GVVV for the upcoming season. A year later, in June 2022, he moved to VV Bennekom.<refKai Huisman stapt over naar Bennekom, gvvv.nl, 22 April 2022</ref>

In the summer 2024, Huisman decided to retire.

== International career ==
Huisman played 3 games for the Netherlands national under-17 football team.

== Career statistics ==
As of match played 21 January 2018

Appearances and goals by club, season and competition
Club	Season	League			KNVB Cup		Europe		Other		Total	
Club	Season	Division	Apps	Goals	Apps	Goals	Apps	Goals	Apps	Goals	Apps	Goals
FC Emmen	2016–17	Eerste Divisie	18	1	1	0	—		4 (Note: Appearances in the Eerste Divisie promotion play-offs)	1	23	2
Heracles Almelo	2017–18	Eredivisie	1	0	0	0	—		—		1	0
Career total			19	1	1	0	0	0	4	1	24	2
