= Stijn van Gassel =

Dutch footballer (born 1996)

Personal information
- Date of birth: 18 October 1996 (age 30)
- Place of birth: Ysselsteyn, Netherlands
- Height: 1.85 m (6 ft 1 in)
- Position: Goalkeeper

Team information
- Current team: Excelsior
- Number: 1

Youth career
- Ysselsteyn
- Venray
- 2009–2014: VVV/Helmond Sport

Senior career*
Years	Team	Apps	(Gls)
2014–2021	Helmond Sport	149	(0)
2021–2024	Excelsior	104	(0)
2024–2025	NEC	2	(0)
2025–	Excelsior	32	(0)
- * Club domestic league appearances and goals as of 17 May 2026

Stijn van Gassel (born 18 October 1996) is a Dutch professional footballer who plays as a goalkeeper for Eredivisie club Excelsior.

== Club career ==
=== Helmond Sport ===
Van Gassel made his professional debut in the Eerste Divisie for Helmond Sport on 22 April 2016 in a game against FC Oss. In the 2016–17 season, he played the final games due to an injury to starting goalkeeper Ferhat Kaya. In the same season, he signed a contract extension with Helmond Sport until 2019. Due to Kaya's departure, Van Gassel became the starting goalkeeper of Helmond Sport ahead of the 2017–18 season.

=== Excelsior ===
On 12 March 2021, Van Gassel rejected an offer by Helmond Sport to extend his contract, in order to pursue an opportunity to play at a higher level. On 31 May 2021, he agreed to sign for fellow Eerste Divisie club Excelsior on a two-year contract starting 1 July. He made his debut for the club on the opening day of the 2021–22 season in a 1–0 home loss to TOP Oss. This match also marked his 150th professional appearance.

=== NEC ===
On 19 June 2024, Eredivisie club NEC announced that Van Gassel had signed a two-year contract with the club, with an option for an additional season.

=== Return to Excelsior ===
On 30 June 2025, Van Gassel returned to Excelsior with a two-season contract.

== Personal life ==
Van Gassel came in the news in June 2026, when his Rotterdam house appeared not be as renovated as the former owners had stated and he went to court.

== Career statistics ==
=== Club ===
As of match played 17 May 2026

Appearances and goals by club, season and competition
Club	Season	League			National cup		Other		Total	
Club	Season	Division	Apps	Goals	Apps	Goals	Apps	Goals	Apps	Goals
Helmond Sport	2013–14	Eerste Divisie	0	0	—		—		0	0
Helmond Sport	2014–15	Eerste Divisie	0	0	0	0	—		0	0
Helmond Sport	2015–16	Eerste Divisie	2	0	—		—		2	0
Helmond Sport	2016–17	Eerste Divisie	7	0	0	0	4 (Note: Appearance(s) in Promotion/Relegation play-offs)	0	11	0
Helmond Sport	2017–18	Eerste Divisie	38	0	1	0	—		39	0
Helmond Sport	2018–19	Eerste Divisie	38	0	1	0	—		39	0
Helmond Sport	2019–20	Eerste Divisie	29	0	1	0	—		30	0
Helmond Sport	2020–21	Eerste Divisie	35	0	1	0	—		36	0
Helmond Sport	Total		149	0	4	0	4	0	157	0
Excelsior	2021–22	Eerste Divisie	36	0	2	0	6	0	44	0
Excelsior	2022–23	Eredivisie	34	0	0	0	—		34	0
Excelsior	2023–24	Eredivisie	34	0	0	0	4	0	38	0
Excelsior	Total		104	0	2	0	10	0	116	0
NEC	2024–25	Eredivisie	2	0	2	0	0	0	4	0
Excelsior	2025–26	Eredivisie	32	0	0	0	—		32	0
Career Total			287	0	8	0	14	0	309	0

== Honours ==
Individual

- Eredivisie Team of the Month: April 2023
