= Arne Naudts =

Belgian footballer

Personal information
- Full name: Arne Marnix Naudts
- Date of birth: 27 November 1993 (age 32)
- Place of birth: Ghent, Belgium
- Height: 1.86 m (6 ft 1 in)
- Position: Striker

Team information
- Current team: Dessel Sport
- Number: 9

Youth career
- Drongen
- Lovendegem
- Deinze
- Cercle Brugge

Senior career*
Years	Team	Apps	(Gls)
2011–2017	Cercle Brugge	93	(12)
2013	→ SV Oudenaarde (loan)	12	(1)
2013	→ KRC Mechelen (loan)	19	(10)
2014–2015	→ Deinze (loan)	32	(11)
2017–2019	Helmond Sport	55	(17)
2019	Unterhaching	0	(0)
2019–2020	Lommel	21	(1)
2020–2021	MVV	32	(9)
2021–2022	Patro Eisden	19	(3)
2022–2024	Tienen	69	(23)
2024–	Dessel Sport	14	(1)

International career
2010–2011	Belgium U18	9	(1)
2011–2012	Belgium U19	11	(3)
2012	Belgium U20	2	(1)
- * Club domestic league appearances and goals as of 6 May 2025

Arne Marnix Naudts (born 27 November 1993) is a Belgian professional football player who plays as forward for Dessel Sport.

== Career ==
On 23 March 2011, Naudts made his debut at the highest level of Belgian football. Naudts replaced Wang Yang in the 83rd minute, in a 0–3 victory for Cercle Brugge against Sporting Charleroi.

Naudts' contract expired at Helmond Sport in the summer of 2019, allowing him to sign as a free player for Unterhaching in July 2019. Only three weeks later however, Naudts left the club already to play for Lommel, as he could not cope with the large travelling distance from his home in Belgium. After one season, he signed with Dutch club MVV Maastricht on 6 October 2020.

On 29 June 2021, he signed with Patro Eisden.
