= Dylan de Braal =

Dutch footballer

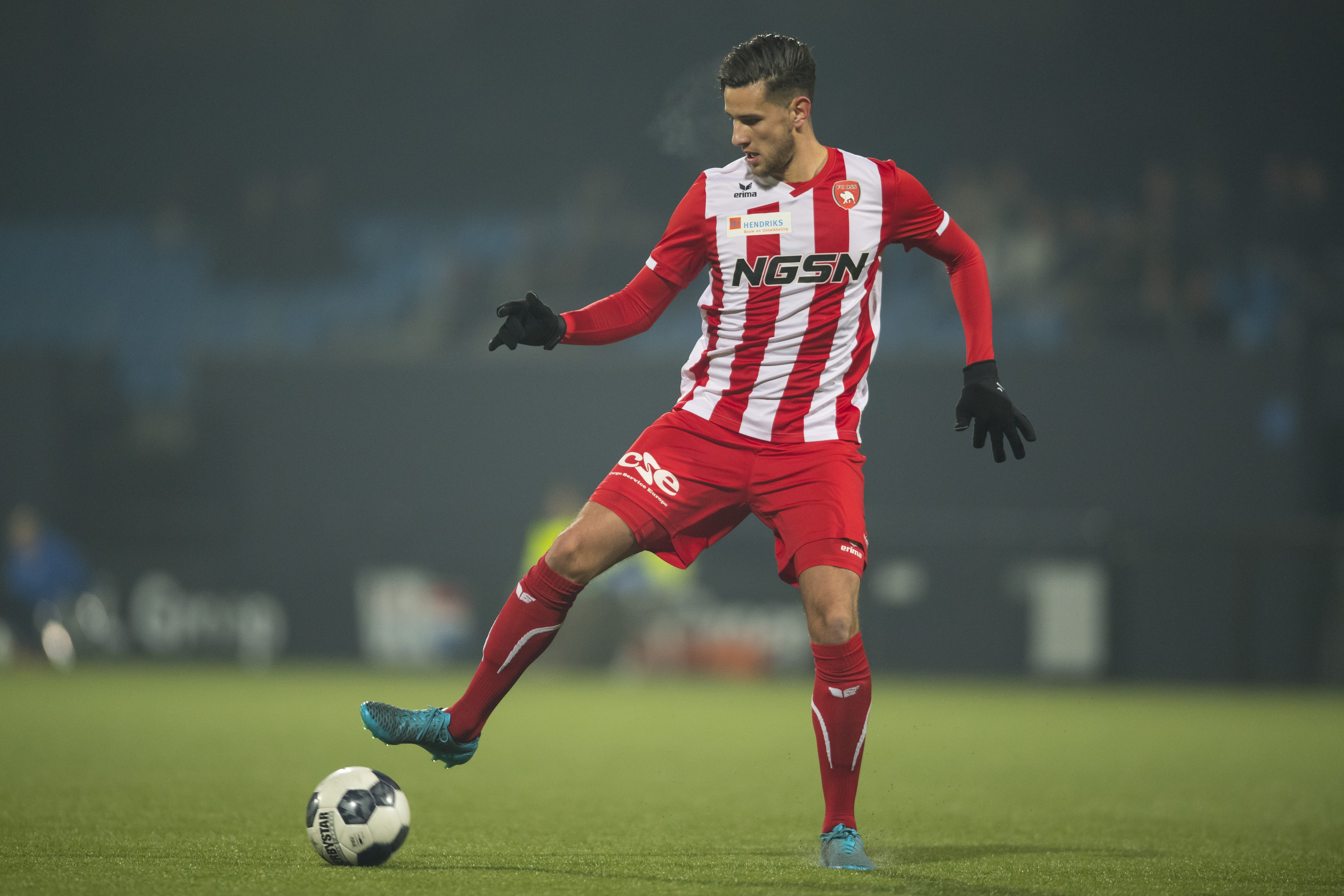
- de Braal with FC Oss in 2017

Personal information
- Date of birth: 19 August 1994 (age 32)
- Place of birth: Den Haag, Netherlands
- Height: 1.94 m (6 ft 4 in)
- Position: Centre back

Youth career
- –2009: GDA
- 2009–2010: TONEGIDO
- 2010–2012: ADO Den Haag
- 2012–2014: Den Bosch

Senior career*
Years	Team	Apps	(Gls)
2014–2016	RKC	6	(0)
2016–2017	TOP Oss	11	(0)
2017–2019	Helmond Sport	39	(1)
2019–2021	Dordrecht	2	(0)
2021–2022	IJsselmeervogels	7	(0)
2022–2023	SteDoCo	1	(0)
2023–2024	SC Feyenoord		
- * Club domestic league appearances and goals as of 17:55, 3 March 2023 (UTC)

Dylan de Braal (born 19 August 1994) is a Dutch retired footballer who played as a centre back.

== Club career ==
He made his professional debut in the Eerste Divisie for RKC Waalwijk on 28 September 2014 in a game against Achilles '29.

In the summer 2019, De Braal joined FC Dordrecht.

On 7 April 2021, De Braal agreed to sign for Tweede Divisie club IJsselmeervogels on a one-year contract starting 1 July. In 2023 he moved from SteDoCo to fellow amateur side SC Feyenoord.
