= Robert van Koesveld =

Dutch footballer (born 1995)

Personal information
- Date of birth: 24 January 1995 (age 31)
- Place of birth: The Hague, Netherlands
- Height: 1.82 m (6 ft 0 in)
- Position: Centre-back

Team information
- Current team: Quick
- Number: 4

Youth career
- Quick
- 2008–2012: Heerenveen
- 2012–2014: Ajax

Senior career*
Years	Team	Apps	(Gls)
2014	Jong Ajax	10	(0)
2015–2018	Heerenveen	0	(0)
2016–2018	→ Helmond Sport (loan)	51	(2)
2018–2019	Cambuur	4	(0)
2019–2024	Scheveningen	91	(3)
2024–	Quick	0	(0)

International career
2012	Netherlands U17	1	(0)
2012	Netherlands U18	2	(0)
- * Club domestic league appearances and goals as of 09:21, 6 October 2024 (UTC)

Robert van Koesveld (born 24 January 1995) is a Dutch footballer who plays as a centre-back for Quick in the Dutch Derde Divisie.

== Club career ==
On 16 April 2012, Van Koesveld signed a three-year contract with Ajax, tying him down to the club until 30 June 2015. He made his professional debut for Jong Ajax in an Eerste Divisie match against FC Den Bosch on 29 August 2014. On 2 February 2015, Van Koesveld signed a contract with SC Heerenveen until the summer of 2017. He was sent on loan to Helmond Sport for the 2016–17 season.

After a trial with Bulgarian club Cherno More, Van Koesveld decided to join Tweede Divisie club SVV Scheveningen, thus ending his professional career.

On 30 April 2024, Van Koesveld was announced as Derde Divisie club HV & CV Quick's new signing ahead of the 2024–25 season, marking his return to the club after sixteen years.

== Career statistics ==
As of match played 13 April 2024

Appearances and goals by club, season and competition
Club	Season	League			KNVB Cup		Other		Total	
Club	Season	Division	Apps	Goals	Apps	Goals	Apps	Goals	Apps	Goals
Jong Ajax	2014–15	Eerste Divisie	10	0	—		—		10	0
Heerenveen	2014–15	Eredivisie	0	0	0	0	—		0	0
Heerenveen	2015–16	Eredivisie	0	0	0	0	—		0	0
Heerenveen	2016–17	Eredivisie	0	0	0	0	—		0	0
Heerenveen	2017–18	Eredivisie	0	0	0	0	—		0	0
Heerenveen	Total		0	0	0	0	—		0	0
Helmond Sport (loan)	2016–17	Eerste Divisie	25	1	0	0	4 (Note: Appearance(s) in Eredivisie play-offs)	0	29	1
Helmond Sport (loan)	2017–18	Eerste Divisie	26	1	1	0	—		18	6
Helmond Sport (loan)	Total		41	2	1	0	4	0	46	2
Cambuur	2018–19	Eerste Divisie	3	0	0	0	1	0	4	0
Scheveningen	2019–20 (Note: Season curtailed due to COVID-19 pandemic in the Netherlands)	Tweede Divisie	20	1	1	0	—		21	1
Scheveningen	2020–21 (Note: Season discontinued due to COVID-19 pandemic in the Netherlands)	Tweede Divisie	2	0	0	0	—		2	0
Scheveningen	2021–22	Tweede Divisie	18	0	0	0	—		18	0
Scheveningen	2022–23	Tweede Divisie	30	1	1	0	—		31	1
Scheveningen	2023–24	Tweede Divisie	20	1	2	0	—		22	1
Scheveningen	Total		90	3	4	0	—		94	3
Career total			144	5	5	0	5	0	154	5
