= Givan Werkhoven =

Dutch footballer

Personal information
- Date of birth: 27 September 1997 (age 29)
- Place of birth: Apeldoorn, Netherlands
- Height: 1.92 m (6 ft 3 1/2 in)
- Position: Forward

Team information
- Current team: Excelsior '31
- Number: 9

Youth career
- AGOVV
- Koninklijke UD
- SV Schalkhaar
- –2016: Go Ahead Eagles

Senior career*
Years	Team	Apps	(Gls)
2017–2019	Go Ahead Eagles	38	(5)
2019–2020	Helmond Sport	23	(2)
2020–	Excelsior '31	62	(24)
- * Club domestic league appearances and goals as of 7 October 2024

Givan Werkhoven (born 27 September 1997) is a Dutch professional footballer who plays as a forward for Excelsior '31.

== Club career ==
He made his Eredivisie debut for Go Ahead Eagles on 14 May 2017 in a game against Sparta Rotterdam.

On 19 June 2019, Werkhoven joined Helmond Sport on a one-year deal.
