= Bram Zwanen =

Dutch footballer

Personal information
- Date of birth: 23 March 1998 (age 28)
- Place of birth: Aarle-Rixtel, Netherlands
- Height: 1.68 m (5 ft 6 in)
- Position: Midfielder

Team information
- Current team: De Treffers

Youth career
- ASV '33
- –2017: VVV-Venlo/Helmond Sport

Senior career*
Years	Team	Apps	(Gls)
2017–2020	Helmond Sport	52	(5)
2020–2021	Gemert		
2021–	De Treffers	7	(1)
- * Club domestic league appearances and goals as of 2 October 2021

Bram Zwanen (born 23 March 1998) is a Dutch football player. He plays for De Treffers.

== Club career ==
He made his Eerste Divisie debut for Helmond Sport on 15 September 2017 in a game against Jong Ajax.

On 28 February 2021, he agreed to join De Treffers for the 2021–22 season.
