= Nick Runderkamp =

Dutch footballer (born 1996)

Personal information
- Full name: Nick Runderkamp
- Date of birth: 6 August 1996 (age 30)
- Place of birth: Purmerend, Netherlands
- Height: 1.83 m (6 ft 0 in)
- Position: Midfielder

Team information
- Current team: RKAV Volendam
- Number: 10

Youth career
- Volendam

Senior career*
Years	Team	Apps	(Gls)
2015–2020	Jong Volendam	76	(7)
2015–2020	Volendam	45	(4)
2020–2023	Quick Boys	72	(11)
2023–	RKAV Volendam	102	(16)
- * Club domestic league appearances and goals as of 18:33, 2 November 2026 (UTC)

Nick Runderkamp (born 6 August 1996) is a Dutch footballer who plays as a midfielder for Tweede Divisie club RKAV Volendam, which he also captains.

Runderkamp came through the youth academy of FC Volendam and played for the club in the Eerste Divisie from 2017 to 2020. He then spent three seasons with Quick Boys in the Tweede Divisie. He joined RKAV Volendam in 2023 and won the Derde Divisie title with the club in his first season.

== Career ==
=== Volendam ===
Runderkamp is from Volendam and progressed through the youth academy of FC Volendam. He made his professional debut on 5 May 2017 in a 3–0 defeat to Fortuna Sittard. Two weeks later, he made his home debut in a promotion play-off match against NAC Breda. He scored in the 85th minute to put Volendam 2–1 ahead, assisted by Rihairo Meulens, but the match ended 2–2.

Runderkamp received more playing time in the 2017–18 season under new head coach Misha Salden. On 20 September 2017, he scored in a 3–1 win away to Quick Boys in the first round of the KNVB Cup. On 12 January 2018, he scored from the halfway line against FC Oss, beating goalkeeper Xavier Mous. Voetbal International named it its Goal of the Week. At the end of the season, Volendam's supporters voted it the club's Goal of the Year.

In the 2018–19 season, Runderkamp mainly played for the reserve team, Jong Volendam. He won the Derde Divisie Sunday title with the side that season. The following season, he was mostly used as a substitute by the first team. On 31 March 2020, Volendam announced that his expiring contract would not be renewed.

=== Quick Boys ===
After leaving Volendam, Runderkamp looked for a contract with a professional club. A trial with NAC Breda did not lead to a deal. On 31 August 2020, he signed for Tweede Divisie club Quick Boys. At the Katwijk club he was reunited with his former Volendam teammate Enzo Stroo. He spent three seasons with Quick Boys.

=== RKAV Volendam ===
Runderkamp joined his hometown amateur club RKAV Volendam on the final day of the 2023 summer transfer window. In his first season, RKAV won the 2023–24 Derde Divisie title with a squad made up entirely of players from Volendam. They sealed the title with a 3–1 win at Hoogeveen on the final day and were promoted to the Tweede Divisie.

Runderkamp captained RKAV in their first season in the Tweede Divisie. He was the only player in the squad with substantial experience at that level. RKAV finished the 2024–25 season in 13th place. He remained captain in the 2025–26 season.

In the 2026–27 KNVB Cup, RKAV knocked out league rivals Spakenburg on penalties after a 2–2 draw on 22 September 2026. The result took them into the main tournament. On 29 October 2026, they beat Rohda Raalte 3–0 to reach the second round.

== Honours ==
Jong FC Volendam

- Derde Divisie Sunday: 2018–19

RKAV Volendam

- Derde Divisie: 2023–24
