= Jeroen Verkennis =

Dutch footballer

Personal information
- Date of birth: 20 December 1998 (age 27)
- Place of birth: Nuenen, Netherlands
- Height: 1.83 m (6 ft 0 in)
- Position: Right back

Team information
- Current team: RKSV Wittenhorst

Youth career
- VVV-Venlo/Helmond Sport

Senior career*
| Years | Team | Apps | (Gls) |
| 2016–2020 | Helmond Sport | 83 | (2) |
| 2020– | RKSV Wittenhorst | 0 | (0) |
- * Club domestic league appearances and goals as of 6 March 2020

Jeroen Verkennis (born 20 December 1998) is a Dutch football player who plays as a right back for RKSV Wittenhorst.

== Club career ==
He made his professional debut in the Eerste Divisie for Helmond Sport on 1 April 2016 in a game against FC Dordrecht.
