= Ron Janzen =

Dutch footballer

Personal information
- Full name: Ron Janzen
- Date of birth: 5 January 1994 (age 32)
- Place of birth: Beilen, Netherlands
- Height: 1.90 m (6 ft 3 in)
- Position: Centre back

Team information
- Current team: VV Gorecht

Youth career
- VV Beilen
- VV Gorecht
- Groningen

Senior career*
Years	Team	Apps	(Gls)
2014–2015	Groningen	0	(0)
2014–2015	→ Cambuur (loan)	0	(0)
2015–2016	Cambuur	1	(0)
2016	RKC Waalwijk	14	(0)
2016–2019	Helmond Sport	72	(3)
2019–	VV Gorecht		
- * Club domestic league appearances and goals as of 12 May 2019

Ron Janzen (born 5 January 1994) is a Dutch professional footballer who plays as a centre back, most recently for Helmond Sport in the Dutch Eerste Divisie. He formerly played for FC Groningen, SC Cambuur, and RKC Waalwijk.

== Career ==
=== Club career ===
In September 2019 it was confirmed, that Janzen had returned to his former youth club VV Gorecht. In February 2020, Janzen signed a pre-contract with Flevo Boys for the 2020–21 season.
