= Giovanni Hiwat =

Dutch footballer (born 1993)

Personal information
- Full name: Giovanni Hiwat
- Date of birth: 11 November 1993 (age 32)
- Place of birth: Zwolle, Netherlands
- Height: 1.71 m (5 ft 7 in)
- Position: Winger

Team information
- Current team: Be Quick '28

Youth career
- Zwolsche Boys
- Excelsior
- FC Zwolle

Senior career*
Years	Team	Apps	(Gls)
2011–2014	PEC Zwolle	25	(2)
2013	→ Cambuur (loan)	6	(1)
2014–2016	Sparta Rotterdam	24	(1)
2016–2018	Helmond Sport	61	(7)
2018–2019	PEC Zwolle	0	(0)
2019	Syrianska	8	(0)
2020–2022	SteDoCo	21	(2)
2022–2023	SDC Putten		
2024	Achilles '29		
2025–	Be Quick '28		
- * Club domestic league appearances and goals

Giovanni Hiwat (born 11 November 1993) is a Dutch footballer who plays as a winger for Be Quick '28. He formerly played for PEC Zwolle and Sparta Rotterdam.

== Career ==
Hiwat signed for Helmond Sport in summer 2016 after he did not make it to Sparta's first eleven structurally. On 10 January 2019, Hiwat signed with Swedish club Syrianska FC.

In July 2020, it was announced that Hiwat would join Derde Divisie club SteDoCo. In the 2023-24 winter break, Hiwat left SDC Putten for Achilles '29. He joined Be Quick '28 in summer 2025.

== Honours ==
PEC Zwolle

- Eerste Divisie: 2011–12
- KNVB Cup: 2013–14

Sparta Rotterdam

- Eerste Divisie: 2015-16
