= Stephen Warmolts =

Dutch footballer

Personal information
- Date of birth: 10 April 1994 (age 32)
- Place of birth: Emmen, Netherlands
- Height: 1.85 m (6 ft 1 in)
- Position: Centre-back

Team information
- Current team: Achilles Veen
- Number: 14

Youth career
- VV Sleen
- VV Emmen
- Emmen
- 2009–2014: Heerenveen

Senior career*
Years	Team	Apps	(Gls)
2014–2016	Heerenveen	0	(0)
2015–2016	→ Helmond Sport (loan)	30	(1)
2016–2018	Helmond Sport	68	(0)
2018–2019	Emmen	8	(1)
2019–2020	HHC Hardenberg	24	(2)
2020–2023	Kozakken Boys	57	(1)
2023–	Achilles Veen		
- * Club domestic league appearances and goals as of 13:43, 7 January 2023 (UTC)

Stephen Warmolts (born 10 April 1994) is a Dutch footballer who plays as a centre-back for Achilles Veen. He formerly played for SC Heerenveen and Helmond Sport.
