= Frank Olijve =

Dutch footballer

Personal information
- Date of birth: 7 March 1989 (age 37)
- Place of birth: Amsterdam, Netherlands
- Height: 1.76 m (5 ft 9 in)
- Position: Midfielder

Team information
- Current team: DVS '33
- Number: 6

Youth career
- VV Wherevogels
- Ajax
- Groningen

Senior career*
Years	Team	Apps	(Gls)
2009–2010	Groningen	3	(0)
2010–2013	PEC Zwolle	52	(1)
2013–2017	FC Emmen	112	(11)
2017–2018	Orange County SC	17	(0)
2018–2020	De Graafschap	45	(2)
2020–2022	SV Spakenburg	34	(0)
2022–	DVS '33		
- * Club domestic league appearances and goals as of 16:56, 7 April 2024 (UTC)

Frank Olijve (born 7 March 1989) is a Dutch professional footballer who plays as a midfielder for DVS '33. He formerly played for FC Groningen, PEC Zwolle, FC Emmen, Orange County SC and De Graafschap.

== Career statistics ==
As of match played 19 January 2018

Appearances and goals by club, season and competition
Club	Season	League			National Cup		Other		Total	
Club	Season	Division	Apps	Goals	Apps	Goals	Apps	Goals	Apps	Goals
Groningen	2008–09	Eredivisie	1	0	0	0	0	0	1	0
Groningen	2009–10	Eredivisie	3	0	0	0	0	0	3	0
Groningen	Total		4	0	0	0	0	0	4	0
PEC Zwolle	2010–11	Eerste Divisie	23	0	2	0	4 (Note: Appearances in the 2010–11 Eerste Divisie promotion play-offs)	0	29	0
PEC Zwolle	2011–12	Eerste Divisie	28	1	2	0	—		30	1
PEC Zwolle	2012–13	Eredivisie	1	0	1	0	—		2	0
PEC Zwolle	Total		52	1	5	0	4	0	61	1
FC Emmen	2013–14	Eerste Divisie	24	3	2	0	—		26	3
FC Emmen	2014–15	Eerste Divisie	28	4	0	0	2 (Note: Appearances in the 2014–15 Eerste Divisie promotion play-offs)	0	30	4
FC Emmen	2015–16	Eerste Divisie	23	2	1	0	2 (Note: Appearances in the 2015–16 Eerste Divisie promotion play-offs)	0	26	2
FC Emmen	2016–17	Eerste Divisie	37	2	2	0	4 (Note: Appearances in the 2016–17 Eerste Divisie promotion play-offs)	1	43	3
FC Emmen	Total		112	11	5	0	8	1	125	12
Orange County	2017	United Soccer League	17	0	0	0	0	0	17	0
De Graafschap	2017–18	Eerste Divisie	2	0	0	0	0	0	2	0
Career total			187	12	10	0	12	1	209	13
