= Joey Godee =

Dutch footballer

Personal information
- Full name: Joey Godee
- Date of birth: 2 March 1989 (age 37)
- Place of birth: Utrecht, Netherlands
- Height: 1.80 m (5 ft 11 in)
- Position: Striker

Team information
- Current team: HVC Amersfoort

Youth career
- 1994–2005: USV Elinkwijk
- 2005–2007: Ajax
- 2007–2008: Sparta

Senior career*
Years	Team	Apps	(Gls)
2008–2012	Sparta	75	(14)
2012–2013	AGOVV	18	(12)
2013–2016	Cercle Brugge	30	(0)
2013–2014	→ Go Ahead Eagles (loan)	27	(0)
2016–2017	Helmond Sport	6	(0)
2017	Dordrecht	16	(3)
2017	Helmond Sport	6	(0)
2018	DOVO	9	(2)
2018–2021	DUNO	11	(0)
2021–	HVC Amersfoort	0	(0)

International career
2008	Netherlands U19	1	(0)
- * Club domestic league appearances and goals as of 10:40, 4 July 2021 (UTC)

Joey Godee (born 2 March 1989) is a Dutch footballer who plays for Dutch Vierde Klasse club HVC Amersfoort.

== Club career ==
Godee played in the youth of USV Elinkwijk, then Ajax, before making the transfer to the youth of Sparta Rotterdam in 2007. He had an impressive 2007–08 season, and thanks in part to his goals, the Sparta under-19 side won the national championship in their age group. This earned Godee his first professional contract.

Godee was promoted to the Sparta senior team by head coach Foeke Booy in preparation for the 2008–09 season. Together with Kevin Strootman, he was one of the best performing youth players of the pre-season. Godee made his professional debut on 31 August 2008 in a match against ADO Den Haag. In November 2008, Godee scored his first official goal for Sparta, in the KNVB Cup match against SC Cambuur. He scored again a few days later in the league match against FC Volendam. Godee scored four senior goals for Sparta in the 2008–09 season. In the 2009–10 season, where Sparta suffered relegation to the second-tier Eerste Divisie, Godee only made seven appearances for Sparta due to injuries, in which he did not score.

In the Eerste Divisie in the 2010–11 season, there were high expectations of Sparta and Godee. He ended the season with a respectable 10 goals, but Sparta performed disappointingly and although the club started the season in first place, they ended out of reach of the playoffs.

In the 2011–12 season, Sparta made a new start. Contract of players from the Eredivisie campaign were terminated, and the first team consisted mainly of new players. Godee stayed and seemed to become the spearhead of the new Sparta. However, after the last minute sale of Jetro Willems to PSV, forward Jeremy Bokila was signed on loan. Godee was benched, and only came into action in eleven games during the season, in which he scored one goal.

In 2012, Godee moved to AGOVV Apeldoorn on a one-year contract. After the club went bankrupt shortly after, he signed a contract with Belgian club Cercle Brugge in January 2013, where he was reunited with his former coach, Foeke Booy. Following Booy's dismissal at the end of April, Cercle Brugge were able to maintain their place in the Belgian First Division under head coach Lorenzo Staelens, who had succeeded Booy. Cercle Brugge had first won the third play-off matchup against Beerschot, and after advancing from the play-offs against three second-tier teams, White Star Woluwe, Mouscron-Péruwelz and Westerlo. On 29 May 2013, Godee signed a three-year contract extension with Cercle Brugge. He reported in the press that retaining Cercle in the First Class was a condition for him to extend his contract.

On 25 July 2013, Godee moved to Go Ahead Eagles on a season-long loan. After the 2013–14 season, he returned to Cercle Brugge. With that club, he suffered relegation in 2015. In July of that year, his contract for another season was terminated. In 2016, he started playing for Helmond Sport on an amateur basis. He finished the season at FC Dordrecht from January 2017 and then returned to Helmond Sport. He left there at the end of November and joined DOVO, alongside fellow former professional Dominique Kivuvu, in mid-February 2018 after a trial in Vietnam. In mid-2018, Godee moved to DUNO in the Hoofdklasse.

Prior to the 2021–22 season, Godee moved to HVC Amersfoort in the lower division Vierde Klasse.

== International career ==
Godee played once for the Netherlands national under-19 football team.

== Personal ==
He is the son of former footballer Edwin Godee.
