= Maikel Verkoelen =

Dutch footballer

Personal information
- Full name: Maikel Franciscus Wilhelmus Verkoelen
- Date of birth: 18 March 1992 (age 34)
- Place of birth: Helmond, Netherlands
- Height: 1.83 m (6 ft 0 in)
- Position: Centre back

Team information
- Current team: HVV Helmond

Youth career
- 2000–2011: PSV

Senior career*
| Years | Team | Apps | (Gls) |
| 2011–2013 | PSV | 0 | (0) |
| 2012–2013 | → FC Eindhoven (loan) | 25 | (2) |
| 2014 | Sportfreunde Siegen | 12 | (0) |
| 2014–2016 | RKC Waalwijk | 53 | (1) |
| 2016–2018 | Helmond Sport | 33 | (1) |
| 2018–2019 | TOP Oss | 8 | (0) |
| 2019 | Helmond Sport | 8 | (0) |
| 2019– | TEC | 1 | (0) |
| 2019–2020 | UNA | 8 | (0) |
| 2020–2022 | Mierlo-Hout | | |
| 2022– | HVV Helmond | | |

International career
| 2007–2010 | Netherlands U17 | 2 | (0) |
| 2010–2011 | Netherlands U19 | 2 | (0) |
- * Club domestic league appearances and goals as of 12:17, 7 February 2026 (UTC)

Maikel Franciscus Wilhelmus Verkoelen (born 18 March 1992) is a Dutch footballer who plays as a centre back for HVV Helmond.

== Club career ==
Verkoelen joined PSV at the age of eight, and eleven years later Verkoelen signed a professional contract at the age of 19. He played against SV Ried in the Europa League qualifying round on 18 August 2011, only make a one-minute appearance after coming on the 90th minute for Marcelo. In September 2011, Verkoelen made his cup debut against VVSB which PSV won 8–0 and Verkoelen set up the sixth goal that was scored by Jürgen Locadia.

In July 2012, Verkoelen joined FC Eindhoven on a season-long loan. He made his debut for the club against MVV, playing the full 90 minutes. Verkoelen scored his first goal for the club on his fifth appearance for FC Eindhoven, in the 3–4 home loss against Helmond Sport.

After having trained with Jong PSV for the first half of the season, Verkoelen signed a deal with German side Sportfreunde Siegen in January 2014. He only stayed until the end of the season.

On 4 August 2014, Verkoelen signed a two-year deal with Dutch Eerste Divisie side RKC Waalwijk after a successful trial. In May 2016, it was announced that Verkoelen had signed with Helmond Sport. He moved to TOP Oss in August 2018, but returned to Helmond Sport six months later.

Ahead of the 2019–20 season, Verkoelen signed with TEC in the third-tier Tweede Divisie. He was, however, released in September 2019, after reacting erroneous when substituted at halftime in a match against Kozakken Boys. He then moved to UNA in the same month. After the season, Verkoelen joined Mierlo-Hout in the seventh-tier Tweede Klasse.

== International career ==
Verkoelen has been capped at Netherlands U17 and Netherlands U19 level.
