= Gillian Justiana =

Curaçaoan footballer (born 1991)

Personal information
- Full name: Gillian Varick Justiana
- Date of birth: 5 March 1991 (age 35)
- Place of birth: Zwolle, Netherlands
- Height: 1.76 m (5 ft 9 in)
- Positions: Left-back; midfielder

Senior career*
| Years | Team | Apps | (Gls) |
| 2009–2011 | PEC Zwolle | 36 | (0) |
| 2011–2017 | Helmond Sport | 171 | (15) |
| 2017–2020 | IJsselmeervogels | 89 | (5) |
| Total | | 296 | (20) |

International career
| 2011–2017 | Curaçao | 14 | (0) |
- * Club domestic league appearances and goals

Gillian Varick Justiana (born 5 March 1991) is a Curaçaoan former footballer who played as a Left-back and a midfielder. He made 14 appearances for the Curaçao national team.

== Career ==
Justiana has played for FC Zwolle, Helmond Sport and IJsselmeervogels.

He made his international debut for Curaçao in 2011, and has appeared in FIFA World Cup qualifying matches.

== Honours ==
Curaçao

- Caribbean Cup: 2017
