= Marc Höcher =

Dutch footballer

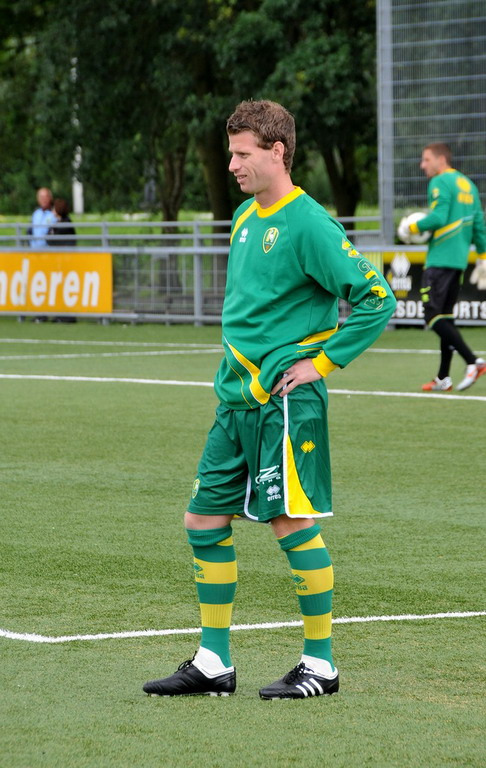

Personal information
- Full name: Marc Höcher
- Date of birth: 9 September 1984 (age 42)
- Place of birth: Almelo, Netherlands
- Height: 1.80 m (5 ft 11 in)
- Position: Winger

Youth career
- Rietvogels
- Heracles

Senior career*
| Years | Team | Apps | (Gls) |
| 2002–2008 | Heracles | 58 | (2) |
| 2007–2008 | → Helmond Sport (loan) | 37 | (5) |
| 2008–2011 | Helmond Sport | 109 | (37) |
| 2011–2012 | ADO Den Haag | 7 | (1) |
| 2012 | → Willem II (loan) | 16 | (4) |
| 2012–2013 | Willem II | 32 | (2) |
| 2013–2015 | Roda JC | 55 | (9) |
| 2015–2016 | Rot-Weiß Erfurt | 18 | (3) |
| 2016–2017 | Helmond Sport | 23 | (3) |
| 2017 | De Treffers | 0 | (0) |
| 2017–2018 | UNA | 7 | (0) |
| Total | | 362 | (66) |
- * Club domestic league appearances and goals

Marc Höcher (born 9 September 1984 in Almelo) is a Dutch retired footballer who played as a winger.

== Career ==
He made his debut in professional football, being part of the Heracles Almelo squad in the 2002–03 season. Since the season 2007–08 he plays for Helmond Sport. In the summer of 2008 he joined Helmond Sport definitely. On 14 March 2011 it became clear that Höcher signed a contract with ADO Den Haag, which later was confirmed by the club. After only playing seven matches in the first half of the 2011–12 season, Höcher was sent on loan to Willem II for the remainder of the season. After the season, he signed a one-year contract with the same team. After the relegation of Willem II, Höcher left the team on a free transfer. On 7 June, he signed three-year contract with Eredivisie side Roda JC Kerkrade. He moved abroad to play for German side Rot-Weiß Erfurt after being deemed surplus to requirements by Roda manager Darije Kalezic. He later had another spell with Helmond Sport.

Aftre retiring as a player, Höcher was named head coach at VV De Valk, a job he combined with that of youth team coach at FC Den Bosch. He later worked at the academy of Vitesse.

== Personal life ==
Höcher was sentenced to 100 hours of community service for sexually transgressive behavior towards a sixteen-year-old girl via WhatsApp. The girl was attending his football school and he gave her private training.
