= Maiky Fecunda =

Curaçaoan footballer

Personal information
- Date of birth: 4 August 1995 (age 31)
- Place of birth: Willemstad, Curaçao
- Height: 1.89 m (6 ft 2 1/2 in)
- Position: Right back

Team information
- Current team: RKSV Nuenen

Youth career
- VV Geldrop
- Helmond Sport

Senior career*
Years	Team	Apps	(Gls)
2013–2019	Helmond Sport	72	(0)
2019–	RKSV Nuenen	0	(0)

International career
2014	Curaçao	5	(0)
- * Club domestic league appearances and goals as of 12 May 2019

Maiky Fecunda (born 4 August 1995) is a Curaçaoan football player who plays for Helmond Sport. He holds Dutch citizenship.

== Club career ==
He made his professional debut in the Eerste Divisie for Helmond Sport on 29 August 2014 in a game against N.E.C.

In July 2019, Fecunda joined RKSV Nuenen.
