= Shpend Hasani =

German footballer (born 1996)

Personal information
- Date of birth: 24 March 1996 (age 30)
- Place of birth: Heinsberg, Germany
- Height: 1.81 m (5 ft 11 in)
- Position: Forward

Youth career
- –2007: 1.FC Heinsberg-Lieck
- 2007–2015: Alemannia Aachen

Senior career*
| Years | Team | Apps | (Gls) |
| 2014–2016 | Alemannia Aachen II | 29 | (13) |
| 2015–2016 | Alemannia Aachen | 5 | (0) |
| 2016–2017 | Helmond Sport | 8 | (0) |
| 2017–2024 | FC Wegberg-Beeck | 198 | (80) |
- * Club domestic league appearances and goals as of 03:18, 4 July 2024 (UTC)

Shpend Hasani (born 24 March 1996) is a German footballer who most recently played as a forward for FC Wegberg-Beeck.

== Career ==
Hasani made his professional debut in the Eerste Divisie for Helmond Sport on 5 August 2016 in a game against MVV Maastricht.
