= Yaël Eisden =

Curaçaoan footballer

Personal information
- Date of birth: 11 January 1994 (age 32)
- Place of birth: Rotterdam, Netherlands
- Height: 1.85 m (6 ft 1 in)
- Position: Midfielder

Team information
- Current team: Excelsior Maassluis
- Number: 15

Youth career
- Spartaan '20
- Sparta Rotterdam

Senior career*
Years	Team	Apps	(Gls)
2015–2016	Sparta Rotterdam	11	(0)
2017	Helmond Sport	14	(0)
2017–2018	RKC Waalwijk	0	(0)
2018–2020	Jelgava	21	(2)
2020	Platanias	2	(0)
2021–2022	ASWH	11	(0)
2022–2023	TEC	29	(0)
2023–	Excelsior Maassluis	22	(0)

International career
2013	Curaçao U20	2	(0)
- * Club domestic league appearances and goals as of 15 October 2024

Yaël Eisden (born 11 January 1994) is a Curaçaoan-Dutch professional footballer who plays as a midfielder for Excelsior Maassluis.

== Club career ==
He made his professional debut in the Eerste Divisie for Sparta Rotterdam on 14 August 2015 in a game against RKC Waalwijk. In 2018, he transferred as a free agent on a 1.5 year contract to the Latvian higher division club FK Jelgava. In 2020 Eisden played for Platanias F.C. In 2021 he signed with ASWH. He moved to SV TEC after the winter break.
