= Gaston Salasiwa =

Dutch footballer

Personal information
- Date of birth: 17 August 1988 (age 38)
- Place of birth: Zaandam, Netherlands
- Height: 1.74 m (5 ft 9 in)
- Positions: Midfielder; left back

Youth career
- WFC
- KFC
- Ajax
- AZ

Senior career*
Years	Team	Apps	(Gls)
2008–2010	AZ	0	(0)
2009–2010	→ Telstar (loan)	24	(2)
2010–2012	Bintang Medan	28	(5)
2012–2014	Telstar	36	(2)
2014–2018	Almere City	122	(12)
2018–2019	Notodden	40	(10)
2020–2021	MVV	35	(1)
2021	Den Bosch	16	(0)
- * Club domestic league appearances and goals as of 20 December 2021

Gaston Salasiwa (born 17 August 1988) is a Dutch professional footballer who plays as a midfielder.

== Career ==
Salasiwa, who is of Indonesian-Moluccan descent, was born in Zaandam and played in his youth for WFC, KFC, Ajax and AZ. In his professional debut on 16 January 2009 for Telstar, Salasiwa scored twice and assisted in the 1–4 away match against Eindhoven. Before his first match at Telstar, Salasiwa had practiced several times with AZ's first team, but had not yet made his competitive debut. In the 2010–11 season, Salasiwa left for Bintang Medan in the Liga Primer Indonesia, a club, which, after dissolving in 2011, changed its name to PSMS Medan. After two years in Indonesia, he returned to Telstar. From the 2014–15 season, Salasiwa played for Almere City. In mid-2018, he moved to Notodden in Norway. His contract expired at the end of 2019, making him a free agent. In September 2020 he continued his career at MVV in the second-tier Eerste Divisie.
