= Nick de Louw =

Dutch footballer

Personal information
- Date of birth: 9 February 1998 (age 28)
- Place of birth: Someren, Netherlands
- Height: 1.76 m (5 ft 9 in)
- Position: Centre back

Team information
- Current team: SV Someren

Youth career
- SV Someren
- VVV-Venlo/Helmond Sport

Senior career*
Years	Team	Apps	(Gls)
2016–2020	Helmond Sport	38	(2)
2020–	SV Someren	0	(0)
- * Club domestic league appearances and goals as of 6 March 2020

Nick de Louw (born 9 February 1998) is a Dutch football player who plays for SV Someren.

== Club career ==
He made his professional debut in the Eerste Divisie for Helmond Sport on 21 October 2016 in a game against De Graafschap.
