= Steven Edwards (footballer) =

Dutch footballer (born 1991)

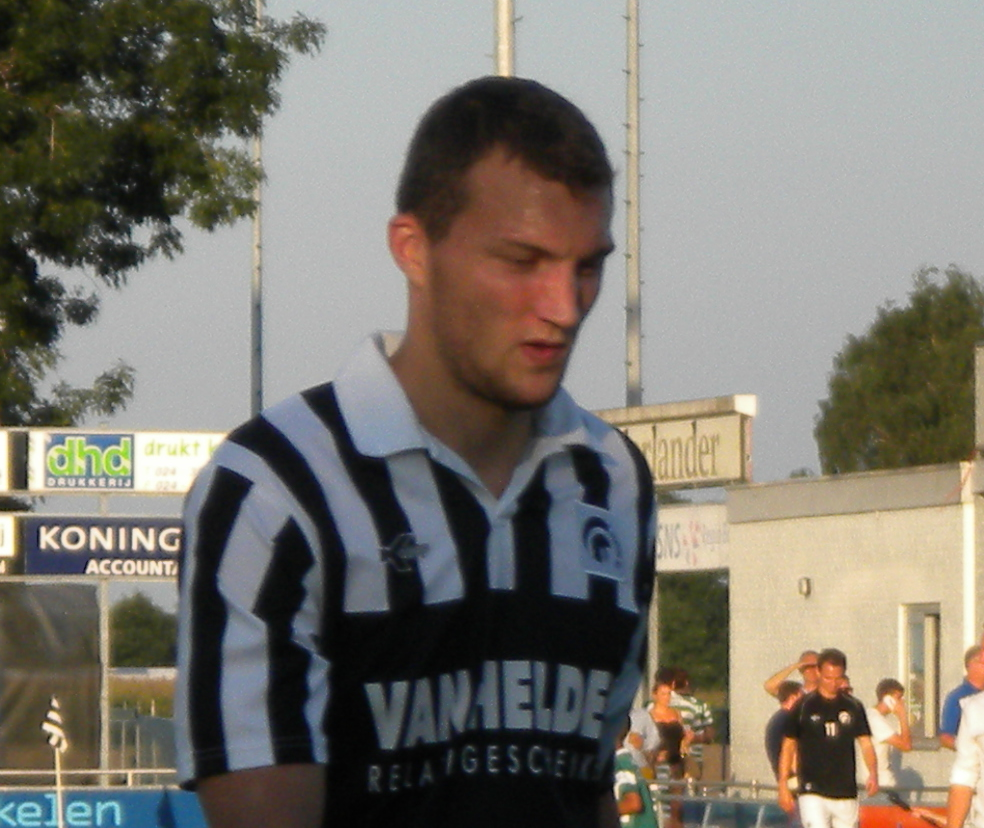
- Edwards with Achilles '29

Personal information
- Date of birth: 15 January 1991 (age 35)
- Place of birth: Breda, Netherlands
- Height: 1.87 m (6 ft 2 in)
- Position: Defensive midfielder

Youth career
- –2000: ADVENDO
- 2000–2012: NAC

Senior career*
Years	Team	Apps	(Gls)
2012–2013	NAC	2	(0)
2013–2015	Achilles '29	66	(5)
2015–2019	Helmond Sport	113	(11)
2019	Royal Cappellen	6	(0)
2020–2023	SteDoCo	44	(5)
2023	Baronie	6	(0)
2023–2024	Capelle	0	(0)
2024–2025	SC Kruisland		
- * Club domestic league appearances and goals as of 23 April 2023

Steven Edwards (born 15 January 1991) is a Dutch footballer who plays as a defensive midfielder for Capelle.

== Career ==
=== Club career ===
He formerly played for NAC and Achilles '29.

On 20 October 2019, Edwards joined Belgian club Royal Cappellen. He returned to the Netherlands in January 2020 to join SteDoCo on a deal for the rest of the season. On 24 February 2020, his contract was extended until the summer 2021. He moved to Baronie in March 2023.

He joined SC Kruisland from Capelle in summer 2024.
