= Jordy Thomassen =

Dutch footballer (born 1993)

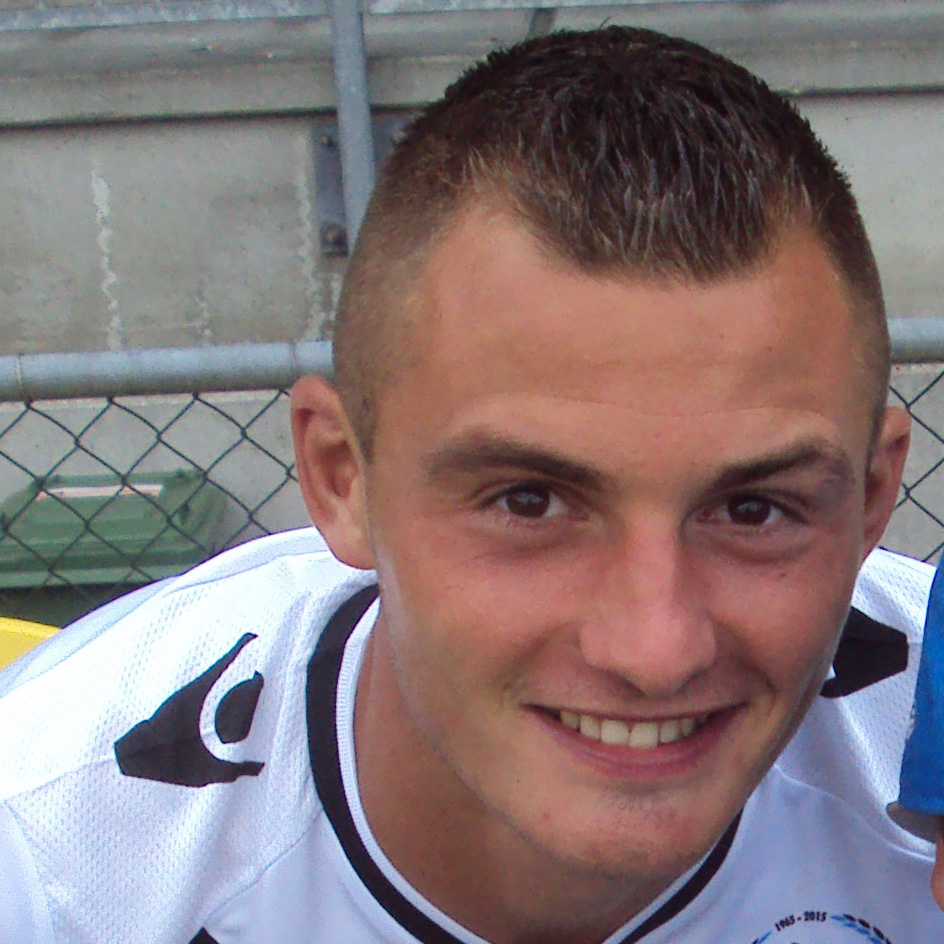

Personal information
- Date of birth: 15 April 1993 (age 33)
- Place of birth: 's-Hertogenbosch, Netherlands
- Height: 1.89 m (6 ft 2 in)
- Position: Forward

Team information
- Current team: Kozakken Boys

Youth career
- Den Bosch

Senior career*
Years	Team	Apps	(Gls)
2013–2016	Den Bosch	75	(8)
2016	→ RKC Waalwijk (loan)	14	(4)
2016–2018	Helmond Sport	75	(25)
2018–2019	De Graafschap	25	(1)
2019	→ Adelaide United (loan)	9	(0)
2020–2021	Helmond Sport	43	(3)
2021–2025	De Treffers	125	(33)
2025–	Kozakken Boys	21	(5)
- * Club domestic league appearances and goals as of 16:00, 4 March 2026 (UTC)

Jordy Thomassen (born 15 April 1993) is a Dutch professional footballer who plays as a striker for Tweede Divisie club Kozakken Boys. He formerly played for FC Den Bosch, RKC Waalwijk, De Graafschap, Adelaide United, and Helmond Sport.
