= Furhgill Zeldenrust =

Dutch footballer (born 1989)

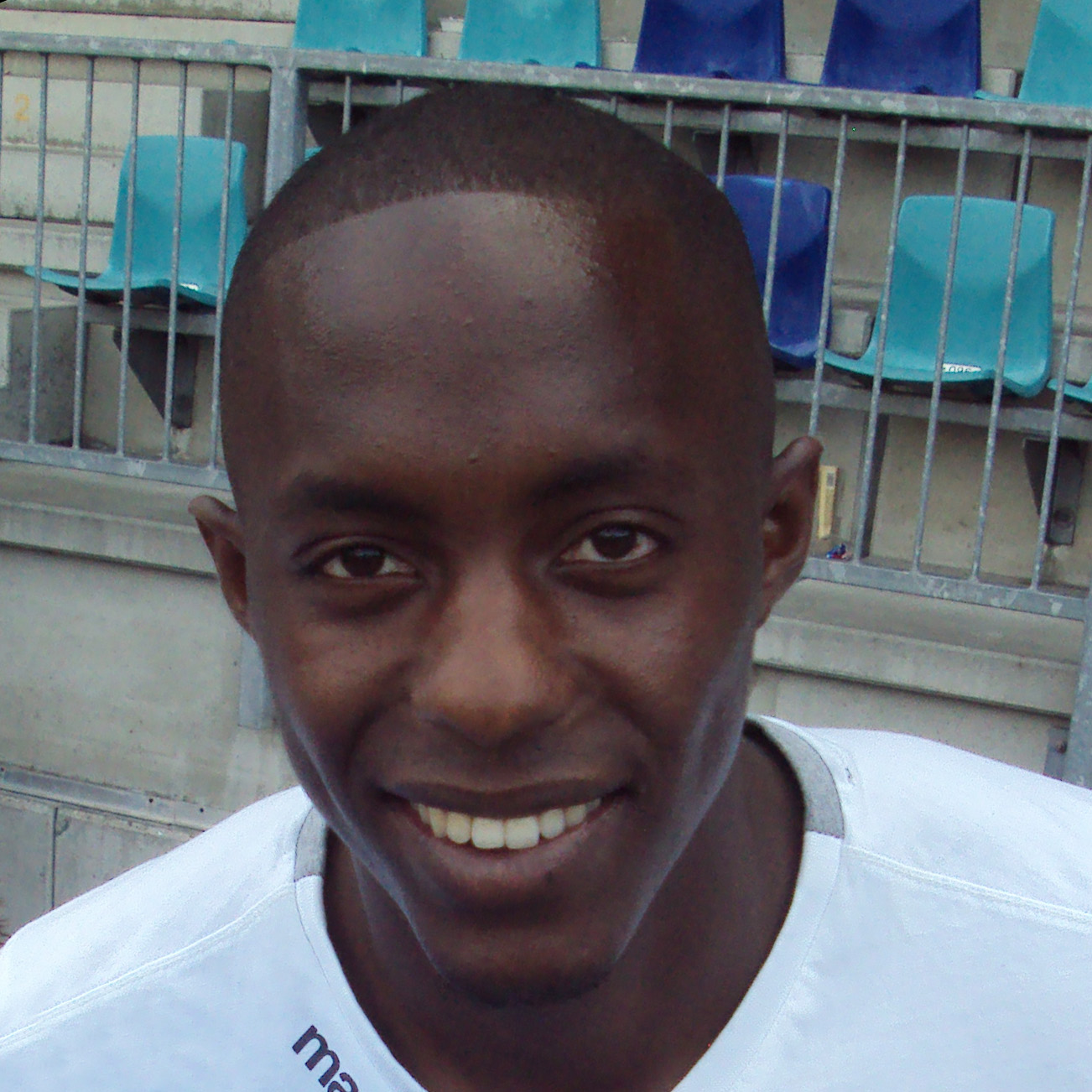
- Furhgill Zeldenrust in 2015

Personal information
- Full name: Furhgill Alcino Glenn Zeldenrust
- Date of birth: 21 July 1989 (age 37)
- Place of birth: Paramaribo, Suriname
- Height: 1.75 m (5 ft 9 in)
- Position: Winger

Team information
- Current team: VV Capelle

Youth career
- SV Bolnes
- RVVH
- RV & AV Sparta

Senior career*
| Years | Team | Apps | (Gls) |
| 2010–2011 | Zwaluwen | 32 | (24) |
| 2012 | Texas Dutch Lions | 14 | (6) |
| 2012–2014 | RKC Waalwijk | 7 | (0) |
| 2013–2014 | → Den Bosch (loan) | 32 | (9) |
| 2014–2015 | Dynamo Dresden | 11 | (0) |
| 2015–2016 | Den Bosch | 31 | (8) |
| 2016–2019 | Helmond Sport | 78 | (16) |
| 2019–2024 | Rijnsburgse Boys | 131 | (57) |
| 2024– | VV Capelle | | |
- * Club domestic league appearances and goals as of 14:33, 16 November 2024 (UTC)

Furhgill Alcino Glenn Zeldenrust (born 21 July 1989) is a Dutch professional footballer who plays for Vierde Divisie club VV Capelle. He formerly played for VV Zwaluwen, Texas Dutch Lions, RKC Waalwijk, FC Den Bosch, Dynamo Dresden and Helmond Sport.
