= Ferhat Kaya =

Belgian footballer (born 1986)

Personal information
- Date of birth: 11 March 1986 (age 40)
- Place of birth: Beringen, Belgium
- Height: 1.88 m (6 ft 2 in)
- Position: Goalkeeper

Youth career
- Westerlo
- 2001–2003: Verbroedering Geel
- 2003–2005: PSV
- 2005–2006: Gaziantepspor
- 2006–2007: Gazişehir Gaziantep
- 2007–2008: PSV

Senior career*
Years	Team	Apps	(Gls)
2006–2007	Gazişehir Gaziantep	0	(0)
2008	FC Eindhoven	0	(0)
2009–2010	Racing Mol-Wezel	39	(0)
2010	FC Brussels	0	(0)
2010–2011	Royal Antwerp	12	(0)
2012–2016	Fortuna Sittard	144	(0)
2016–2017	Helmond Sport	31	(0)
2017–2019	Sakaryaspor	2	(0)
2021–2022	KVK Beringen		
- * Club domestic league appearances and goals as of 19:23, 1 February 2026 (UTC)

Ferhat Kaya (born 11 March 1986) is a Belgian footballer who plays as a goalkeeper. He has Kurdish descent.

== Career ==
Kaya was born in Beringen, Belgian Limburg, and started playing football at the Westerlo youth academy. Via Verbroedering Geel, he moved to the PSV Eindhoven academy in 2003. After having played there for two years, Kaya left for Turkish club Gaziantepspor.

In August 2008, after three years in Turkey, Kaya signed with Eerste Divisie club FC Eindhoven after a successful trial. A year later, he signed with Racing Mol-Wezel in the Belgian Third Division. Afterwards, he had stints with FC Brussels and Royal Antwerp.

Kaya then trained for six months with SV Meerssen, before signing a contract with Fortuna Sittard, who was looking for a successor to Danny Wintjens, who had moved to PEC Zwolle. Kaya became the starting goalkeeper at the club, andafter 144 matches, Kaya signed a two-year contract with Helmond Sport in June 2016.

He was signed by Sakaryaspor in the summer of 2017 on a free transfer. In April 2019, Kaya terminated his contract by mutual consent, after he had not received his salary.

In March 2021, after being a free agent for two years, Kaya joined Belgian Division 3 club Beringen.
