= Enzo Stroo =

Dutch footballer (born 1994)

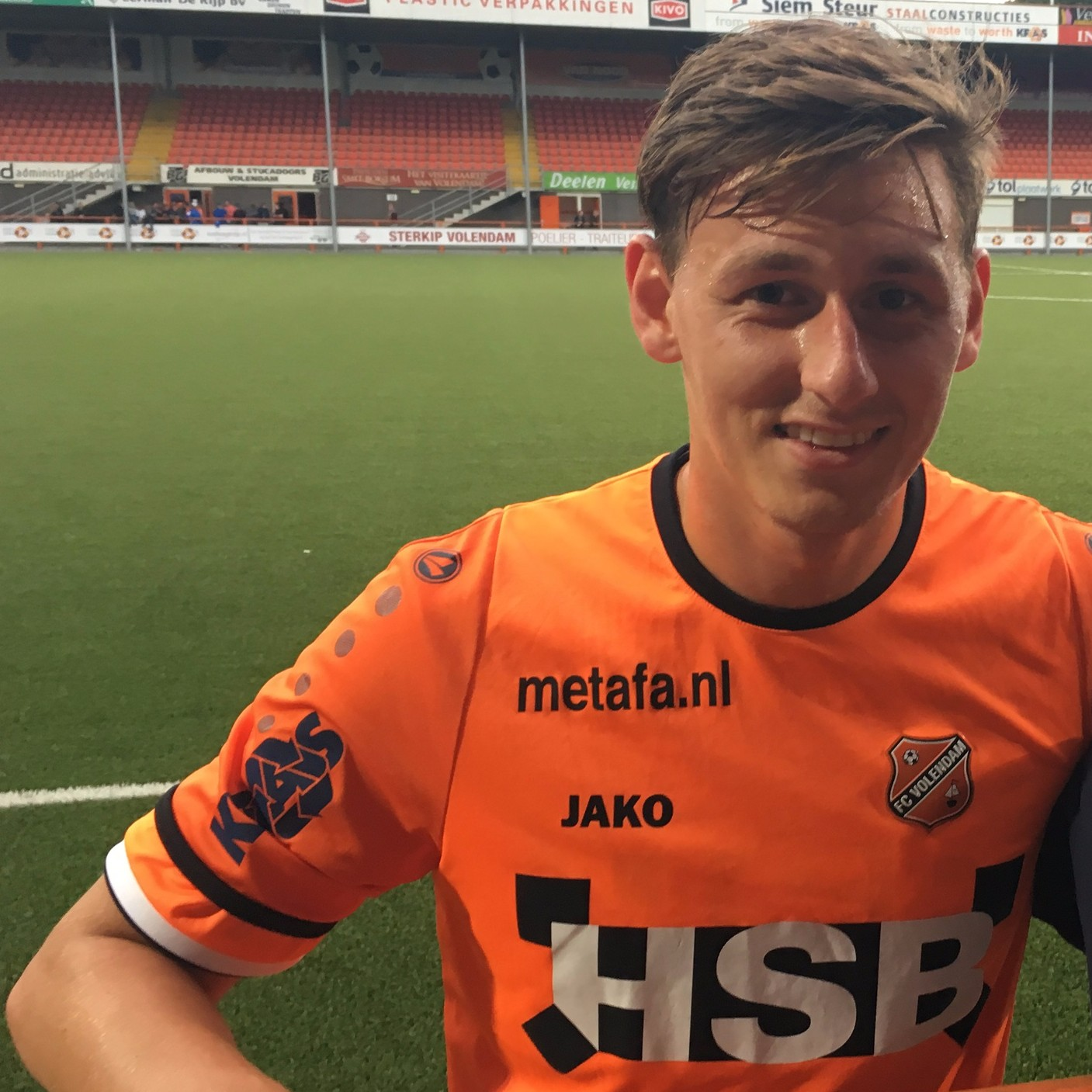
- Stroo with Volendam in 2017

Personal information
- Date of birth: 6 June 1994 (age 32)
- Place of birth: Landsmeer, Netherlands
- Height: 1.84 m (6 ft 0 in)
- Position: Forward

Team information
- Current team: Lisse
- Number: 9

Youth career
- 1999–2010: IVV

Senior career*
Years	Team	Apps	(Gls)
2010–2015	IVV		
2015–2016	Zilvermeeuwen		
2016–2019	Jong Volendam	29	(19)
2016–2019	Volendam	57	(21)
2019–2020	TOP Oss	17	(0)
2020–2021	Quick Boys	2	(0)
2021–	Lisse	114	(39)
- * Club domestic league appearances and goals as of 15:13, 4 August 2025 (UTC)

Enzo Stroo (born 6 June 1994) is a Dutch footballer who plays as a forward for Lisse.

Starting his career in amateur football with IVV Landsmeer and ZVV Zilvermeeuwen, Stroo turned professional at age 21 while playing for Volendam. After becoming club topscorer for the 2017–18 season, he took a step back, and after playing for TOP Oss, he retired from professional football. He has since worked as a physiotherapist and played on an amateur deal at Quick Boys.

== Club career ==
=== Early career ===
Stroo started playing football at the age of five at IVV Landsmeer, where he made his debut on the first team at the age of 16. In the 2012–13 season, Stroo became the top scorer of the Derde Klasse with 35 goals. This earned him a transfer to ZVV Zilvermeeuwen, who competed in the Tweede Klasse at the time. In the summer of 2016, Stroo started playing for FC Volendam on an amateur deal. He was then added to the squad of the under-21 side, Jong FC Volendam, playing in the Derde Divisie. In February 2017, Stroo became the top goalscorer of Jong Volendam with nine goals.

He made his professional debut in the Eerste Divisie for FC Volendam on 3 February 2017 in a game against FC Emmen.

=== Professional career ===
Manager Robert Molenaar, head coach of the first team of Volendam, included Stroo in the first-team squad in February 2017 for a match against FC Emmen. Stroo started on the bench and came on as a substitute in the 86th minute to replace Erik Schouten. Volendam lost the match 3–1. He made 15 league appearances during that season in which he scored six goals. Stroo signed his first professional contract on 28 April 2017, which tied him to the club until mid-2019. For the 2017–18 season, he was definitively included in the first team. That season, he made his definitive breakthrough and made 33 appearances in the Eerste Divisie. He finished the season as club topscorer with fifteen goals. In the following season, he began struggling with his firm. In late September 2018, head coach Misha Salden was dismissed. Under his successor Hans de Koning, Stroo barely managed to make any appearances and was demoted to third striker on the team. Due to a lack of playing time, Stroo expressed his desire to leave Volendam. During the winter break, Stroo went on a trial at Romanian club FC Botoșani, who were participating in training camp in Turkey. However, a move failed to materialise. As a result, he terminated his contract with Volendam in late January 2019. Stroo then signed a contract for a season and a half with TOP Oss, including an option for an extra year. After his contract with TOP Oss expired, Stroo retired from professional football.

=== Later years ===
In addition to his football activities, Stroo followed a vocational (HBO) study to become a physiotherapist. He works as a physiotherapist in Purmerend, and began playing football on an amateur deal at Tweede Divisie club Quick Boys. In January 2021, it was announced that Stroo would play for FC Lisse from the 2021–22 season.
