= Teije ten Den =

Dutch footballer (born 1993)

Personal information
- Date of birth: 29 April 1993 (age 33)
- Place of birth: Utrecht, Netherlands
- Height: 1.93 m (6 ft 4 in)
- Position: Forward

Team information
- Current team: Rohda Raalte
- Number: 9

Youth career
- 1998–2011: Rohda Raalte

Senior career*
Years	Team	Apps	(Gls)
2011–2012	Rohda Raalte		
2012–2017	Go Ahead Eagles	29	(5)
2015	→ FC Oss (loan)	11	(1)
2016–2017	→ Helmond Sport (loan)	33	(10)
2017–2018	Volendam	49	(8)
2019	Guijuelo	11	(0)
2019–2020	Hospitalet	9	(0)
2020–2021	Kozakken Boys	3	(2)
2021–2023	De Treffers	35	(9)
2023–	Rohda Raalte	55+	(17+)
- * Club domestic league appearances and goals as of 18:19, 28 October 2026 (UTC)

Teije ten Den (born 29 April 1993) is a Dutch footballer who plays as a forward for Tweede Divisie club Rohda Raalte.

== Career ==
Ten Den started his career as a football player at the age of five with the amateurs of Rohda Raalte, and was promoted to the first team in 2011. In July 2012, he was signed by professional club Go Ahead Eagles. Ten Den made his debut on 29 August 2014 in the 1–0 home win against Willem II, where he was brought in for Marnix Kolder in the final phase of the game. On 20 September 2014, he scored his first goal in professional football. In the 60th minute, he headed the ball via Timothy Derijck and past goalkeeper Martin Hansen against ADO Den Haag. Ten Den made his first start on 24 September 2014, in the 2–0 cup win over Feyenoord. In February 2015, he was sent on loan to FC Oss for six months. In 2016, Ten Den was sent on another loan – this time to Helmond Sport – for one year.

On 18 June 2017, Ten Den signed a two-year contract with Volendam. His contract was terminated by mutual consent on 31 January 2019. He continued his career in Spain with Guijuelo competing in the Segunda División B. In August 2019, he moved to Hospitalet in the fourth-tier Tercera División. In the 2020–21 season he played at semi-professional level for Kozakken Boys in the Dutch Tweede Divisie. In March 2021, Ten Den reached an agreement with De Treffers, which would see him join the club from the start of the 2021–22 season. He made his debut for the club on 22 August 2021 in a 1–1 draw against Jong Sparta Rotterdam in the Tweede Divisie.

On 25 March 2023, Ten Den returned to his former club Rohda Raalte, after finding a civil job and moving to Deventer.
