= Robert Braber =

Dutch footballer (born 1982

Personal information
- Date of birth: 9 November 1982 (age 44)
- Place of birth: Rotterdam, Netherlands
- Height: 1.93 m (6 ft 4 in)
- Position: Midfielder

Team information
- Current team: TOP Oss (assistant)

Youth career
- 1999–2004: Excelsior

Senior career*
Years	Team	Apps	(Gls)
2004–2005	NAC	0	(0)
2005	→ Helmond Sport (loan)	16	(2)
2005–2006	Helmond Sport	34	(6)
2006–2009	Excelsior	62	(12)
2009–2010	FC Ingolstadt 04	21	(1)
2010–2014	RKC Waalwijk	132	(20)
2014–2016	Willem II	53	(3)
2016–2018	Helmond Sport	48	(4)
Total		366	(48)

Managerial career
- 2021–2022: RBC
- 2022: Cluzona
- 2023–: TOP Oss (assistant)
- * Club domestic league appearances and goals

Robert Braber (born 9 November 1982) is a Dutch football manager and former player who played as a midfielder. He is the assistant coach of Eerste Divisie club TOP Oss.

== Club career ==
His former clubs are NAC Breda and Helmond Sport. Braber moved from Excelsior to Swansea City in the Coca Cola Championship on 22 June 2009 on trial, and signed then a one-year contract with FC Ingolstadt 04 on 3 July 2009.

In the summer of 2016, Braber returned to former club Helmond Sport.

== Managerial career ==
After having worked as team-manager for his former club RKC Waalwijk since his retirement from football in 2018, Braber was appointed head coach of RBC in February 2021 where he succeeded Koos Waslander.

On 4 October 2023, Braber was appointed assistant coach to manager Ruud Brood at Eerste Divisie club TOP Oss.

== Honours ==
=== Club ===
RKC Waalwijk:

- Eerste Divisie: 2010–11
