= 2015–16 Sparta Rotterdam season =

Sparta Rotterdam
2015–2016 season
- Manager: Alex Pastoor
Home colours	Away colours

The 2015–2016 Sparta Rotterdam season is Sparta's 61st season of play.

== Matches ==
Win Tie Loss

=== Eerste Divisie ===
14 August 2015	RKC Waalwijk	1–1	Sparta	Waalwijk
	Arsenio Valpoort 87'	Summary	Thomas Verhaar 38'; Brogno (yellow card) 89'	Stadium: Mandemakers Stadion; Attendance: 2.200; Referee: (Netherlands) Erwin Blank

21 August 2015	Sparta	3–0	FC Eindhoven	Rotterdam
	Goal		Goal	Stadium: Sparta-Stadion Het Kasteel

24 August 2015	VVV Venlo	1–1	Sparta	Venlo
	Goal		Goal	Stadium: Seacon Stadion De Koel

30 August 2015	Sparta	5–2	FC Den Bosch	Rotterdam
	Goal		Goal	Stadium: Sparta-Stadion Het Kasteel

11 September 2015	Sparta	3–0	Achilles '29	Rotterdam
	Goal		Goal	Stadium: Sparta-Stadion Het Kasteel

14 September 2015	Jong PSV	0–3	Sparta	Eindhoven
	Goal		Goal	Stadium: Sportcomplex De Herdgang

25 September 2015	Sparta	2–1	Telstar	Rotterdam
	Goal		Goal	Stadium: Sparta-Stadion Het Kasteel

2 October 2015	Go Ahead Eagles	2–0	Sparta	Deventer
	Goal		Goal	Stadium: De Adelaarshorst

18 October 2015	Sparta	3–1	FC Oss	Rotterdam
	Goal		Goal	Stadium: Sparta-Stadion Het Kasteel

23 October 2015	NAC Breda	4–0	Sparta	Breda
	Goal		Goal	Stadium: Rat Verlegh Stadion

1 November 2015	FC Emmen	1–3	Sparta	Emmen
	Goal		Goal	Stadium: Univé Stadion

6 November 2015	Sparta	3–2	Almere City FC	Rotterdam
	Goal		Goal	Stadium: Sparta-Stadion Het Kasteel

20 November 2015	Fortuna Sittard	1–4	Sparta	Sittard
	Goal		Goal	Stadium: Offermans Joosten Stadion

27 November 2015	Sparta	2–1	Helmond Sport	Rotterdam
	Goal		Goal	Stadium: Sparta-Stadion Het Kasteel

30 November 2015	Jong Ajax	1–1	Sparta	Amsterdam
	Goal		Goal	Stadium: Sportpark De Toekomst

4 December 2015	Sparta	3–1	FC Volendam	Rotterdam
	Ketting (yellow card) 33' van Moorsel 71'; Verhaar 86' 90+2' (pen.)	Summary	Laghmouchi 48'; Mertens (yellow card) 90'; Schilder (yellow card) 90+2'	Stadium: Sparta-Stadion Het Kasteel; Attendance: 7,186; Referee: (Netherlands) Eric Braamhaar

11 December 2015	FC Dordrecht	0–3	Sparta	Dordrecht
	Fortes (yellow card) 34'; Steenvoorden (yellow card) 81'; Janga (yellow card) 86'	Summary	Verhaar 2'; Finn Stokkers 86' 89'	Stadium: GN Bouw Stadion; Attendance: 3,399; Referee: (Netherlands) Bas Nijhuis

18 December 2015	Sparta Rotterdam	6–0	MVV Maastricht	Rotterdam
20:00	van Moorsel 1' 65' 71'; Brogno 76'; Verhaar 79'; Sanusi (yellow card) 80' (goal) 90+2'	Summary	Knops (yellow card) 39'; Nys (yellow card) 65'	Stadium: Sparta Stadion Het Kasteel; Attendance: 6,625; Referee: (Netherlands) Jochem Kamphuis

18 January 2016	Sparta Rotterdam	5–2	RKC Waalwijk	Rotterdam
20:00	Denzel Dumfries 28' (yellow card) 57'; Bergkamp 34'; Verhaar 41'; Breur 75'; Brogno 80'	Summary	Kindermans 53'; Nieuwendaal (yellow card) 61' (goal) 67' van Weert (yellow card) 75'	Stadium: Sparta Stadion Het Kasteel; Attendance: 5,854; Referee: (Netherlands) Ed Janssen

22 January 2016	FC Eindhoven	1–1	Sparta Rotterdam	Eindhoven
20:00	Swinnen (yellow card) 43'; Caenepeel 55' (pen.); Koç (yellow card) 66'; Deschilder (yellow card) 74'	Summary	van Moorsel 28'; Sanusi (yellow card) 58'; Dougall (yellow card) 66'; Dijkstra (yellow card) 90+1'	Stadium: Jan Louwers Stadion; Attendance: 2,269; Referee: (Netherlands) Dennis Higler

31 January 2016	FC Den Bosch	1–2	Sparta Rotterdam	's-Hertogenbosch
14:30	Biemans (yellow card) 31' (goal) 87'; Vossebelt (yellow card) 56'; Pozder (yellow card) 90'	Summary	van Moorsel (yellow card) 44' (goal) 51'; Breur (yellow card) 84' van Drongelen (yellow card) 86'; Rick Ketting 90+4'	Stadium: De Vliert; Attendance: 2,698; Referee: (Netherlands) Kevin Blom

7 February 2016	Sparta Rotterdam	3–1	VVV-Venlo	Rotterdam
14:30	Dijkstra (yellow card) 3'; Verhaar 9' 89' van Moorsel (yellow card) 53'; Brogno (yellow card) 56'; Rick Ketting (yellow card) 62'; Sanusi 79'	Summary	Nijholt (yellow card) 6' van Crooy 26'; Buwalda (yellow card) 49'; Post (yellow card) 77'	Stadium: Sparta Stadion Het Kasteel; Attendance: 9,607; Referee: (Netherlands) Jeroen Manschot

12 February 2016	Achilles '29	0–3	Sparta Rotterdam	Groesbeek
20:00	Hendrijks (yellow card) 32'; Boelens (yellow card) 59'; Paau (yellow card) 83'	Summary	Brogno 8'; Verhaar 20'; Klassen 58'; Dougall (yellow card) 79'	Stadium: Sportpark De Heikant; Attendance: 2,362; Referee: (Netherlands) Jochem Kamphuis

15 February 2016	Sparta Rotterdam	1–0	Jong PSV	Rotterdam
20:00	van Moorsel 71'; Dumfries (yellow card) 90'	Summary		Stadium: Sparta Stadion Het Kasteel; Attendance: 6,455; Referee: (Netherlands) Karel van den Heuvel

19 February 2016	Telstar	1–3	Sparta Rotterdam	Velsen
20:00	Lilipaly 19' van Berkel (yellow card) 47'; Ottenhoff (yellow card) 52'; Serrarens (yellow card) 61'; Korpershoek (yellow card) 83'	Summary	Brogno 8'; Verhaar 36' (yellow card) 90+2'; Sanusi 52'; Dougall (yellow card) 62'	Stadium: Telstar Stadion; Attendance: 2,763; Referee: (Netherlands) Edwin van de Graaf

28 February 2016	Sparta Rotterdam	3–1	Go Ahead Eagles	Rotterdam
14:30	Breuer 27'; Brogno 59'; Verhaar 70'	Summary	Lambooij (yellow card) 22'; Schenk (yellow card) 42'; Duits (yellow card) 44' (yellow-red card) de Kogel 67'	Stadium: Sparta Stadion Het Kasteel; Attendance: 9,395; Referee: (Netherlands) Bas Nijhuis

4 March 2016	FC Oss	v	Sparta Rotterdam	Oss
				Stadium: Heesen Yachts Stadion
