= François Gesthuizen =

Dutch footballer and manager (born 1972)

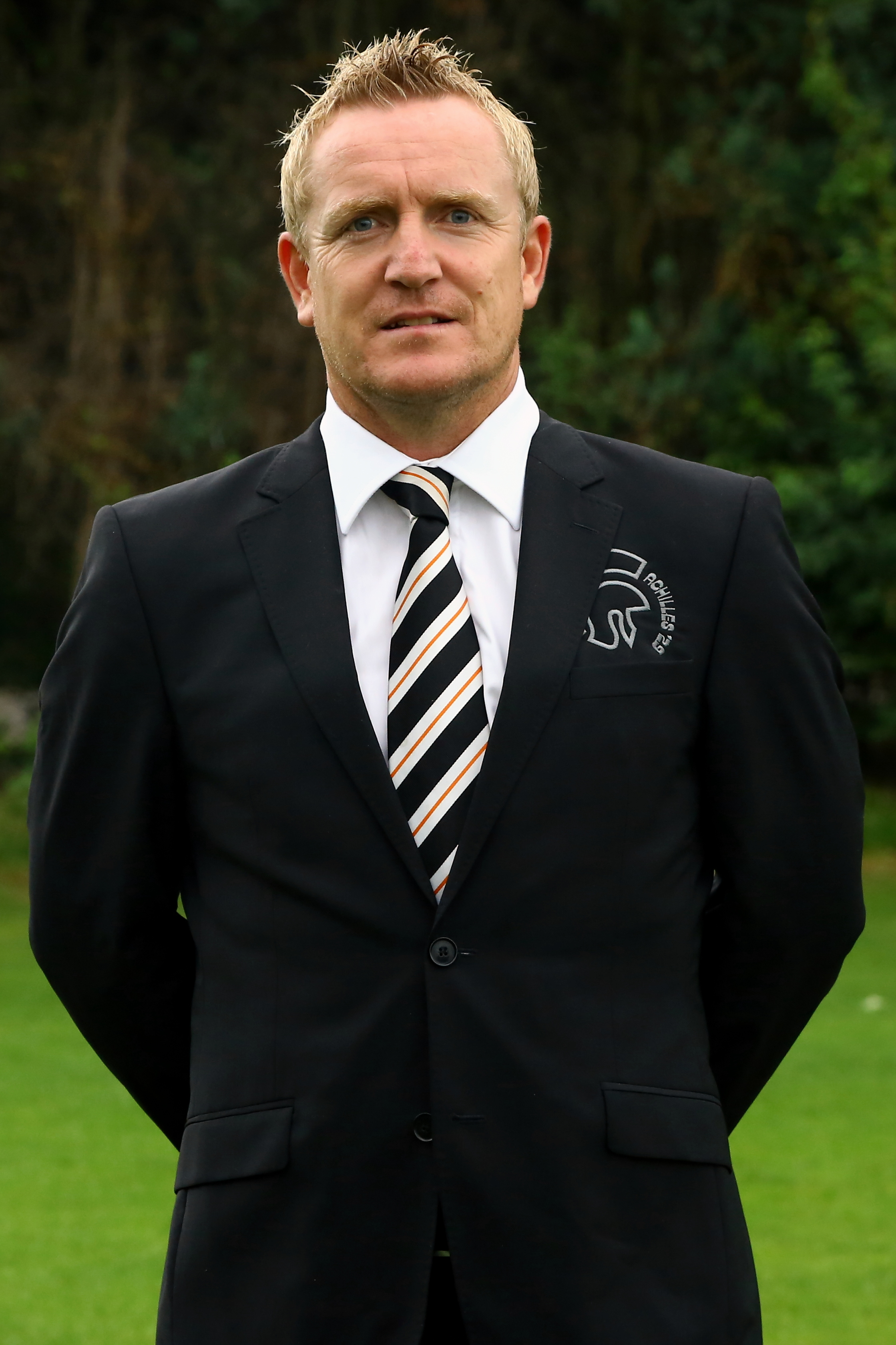
- Gesthuizen as head coach of Achilles '29

Personal information
- Full name: Franciscus Johannes Antonius Gesthuizen
- Date of birth: 18 September 1972 (age 54)
- Place of birth: Millingen aan de Rijn, Netherlands
- Height: 1.70 m (5 ft 7 in)
- Position: Midfielder

Youth career
- MVV '18
- SV Hatert
- NEC
- –1991: PSV Eindhoven

Senior career*
Years	Team	Apps	(Gls)
1991–1994	PSV	0	(0)
1992–1994	→ NAC (loan)	62	(4)
1994–1997	NAC	20	(0)
1997–2000	Fortuna Sittard	50	(1)
2000–2002	Cambuur	28	(2)
2002–2005	TOP Oss	55	(5)
2005–2008	JVC Cuijk		
Total		215	(12)

International career
1988–1989	Netherlands U17	7	(2)
1989	Netherlands U18	1	(0)
1992–1993	Netherlands U21	2	(0)

Managerial career
- 2010–2011: RKVV Rood Wit
- 2011–2013: Blauw Geel '38
- 2013–2015: Achilles '29
- 2015–2016: DFS
- 2016–2017: FC Oss
- 2017–2019: NEC (U17)
- 2019: NEC (U19)
- 2019–2020: NEC
- 2020–2021: NEC (U18)
- 2021–2022: De Treffers
- * Club domestic league appearances and goals

Franciscus Johannes Antonius Gesthuizen "François" Gesthuizen (born 18 September 1972) is a Dutch professional football manager and former player, who is currently coaching hometown club SC Millingen.

== Playing career ==
=== Club career ===
Born in Millingen aan de Rijn, Gelderland, Gesthuizen started playing football at MVV '18 in his hometown as a midfielder. Afterwards he played youth football at SV Hatert, NEC and PSV. He made his debut in the 1992–93 season on loan at NAC, for whom he made 82 total appearances during his time there. With the club he managed to achieve promotion to the Eredivisie in his first season. In 1994, NAC signed him on a permanent deal from PSV.

In 1997, Gesthuizen moved to Fortuna Sittard. He made more than 50 appearances for the Limburg team in three seasons. In 2000, Gesthuizen moved to SC Cambuur, where he would stay for two seasons. In 2002, he left for TOP Oss, where he retired from professional football three years later, in 2005.

Gesthuizen made a total of 216 appearances in professional football, scoring 12 goals. As amateur level, he continued with JVC Cuijk in the Hoofdklasse until 2008.

=== International career ===
Gesthuizen was a Dutch youth international. He was part of the Netherlands national under-16 team at the 1989 UEFA European Under-16 Championship in Denmark. He played 7 games (2 goals) for the Netherlands national under-17 football team.

== Managerial career ==
Gesthuizen started his coaching career at his last professional club; TOP Oss. For this club, he worked for several years as a youth coach at the regional football academy NEC/FC Oss, for the U17 team, among others.

In 2010, Gesthuizen was appointed head coach of eight tier Derde Klasse club VV Rood Wit from Breedeweg, where he won the championship in his first season. He then moved to fifth-tier Hoofdklasse club Blauw Geel '38 from Veghel. In his first season, he finished in second place behind VV Gemert and in fifth place in his second season.

Gesthuizen signed a two-year contract as head coach of Achilles '29 in June 2013. Arno Arts had long been considered a favorite to succeed Jan van Deinsen in the position, but according to chairman Harrie Derks, both men matched the profile of the new head coach; a young coach with professional footballing experience from the region. The Groesbeek-based team made their first ever appearance in the second-tier Eerste Divisie that season. In Gesthuizen's debut in the Eerste Divisie, Achilles drew 2–2 at FC Emmen. In their debut season, Achilles '29 finished in last place and suffered relegation to the Derde Divisie.

In October 2014, it was announced that Gesthuizen's contract with Achilles would not be extended and that he was replaced by Eric Meijers. In May 2015, Gesthuizen passed for the coaching diploma. In June 2015, Gesthuizen was appointed as the new head coach of DFS. In the summer of 2016, he moved to TOP Oss. He was dismissed half a season later, in February 2017, after a 2–7 home loss to SC Cambuur. At that time, TOP Oss was in 17th position in the Eerste Divisie.

From the 2017–18 season, Gesthuizen coached the U17 side of the NEC/TOP Oss academy and worked as an analyst for the first team of NEC. In the 2019–20 season, he became joint head coach of NEC together with Adrie Bogers and Rogier Meijer, where he was mostly the face of the trio towards the media. In mid-2020, he became the coach of the NEC U18 team, after losing out to Mark Otten for the position of U21 coach.

In November 2021, Gesthuizen succeeded Jan de Jonge in the De Treffers hot seat, only to be dismissed in April 2022. He was named head coach at hometown club SC Millingen in December 2023.

== Managerial statistics ==
As of 29 September 2020.

Team	From	To	Record							
Team	From	To	G	W	D	L	GF	GA	GD	Win %
Achilles '29	1 July 2013	30 June 2015	79	15	16	48	90	171	−81	18.99
FC Oss	1 July 2016	15 March 2018	31	9	4	18	56	86	−30	29.03
NEC	1 July 2019	30 June 2020	30	12	9	9	53	41	+12	40.00
