= Arno Arts =

Dutch football player and manager (born 1969)

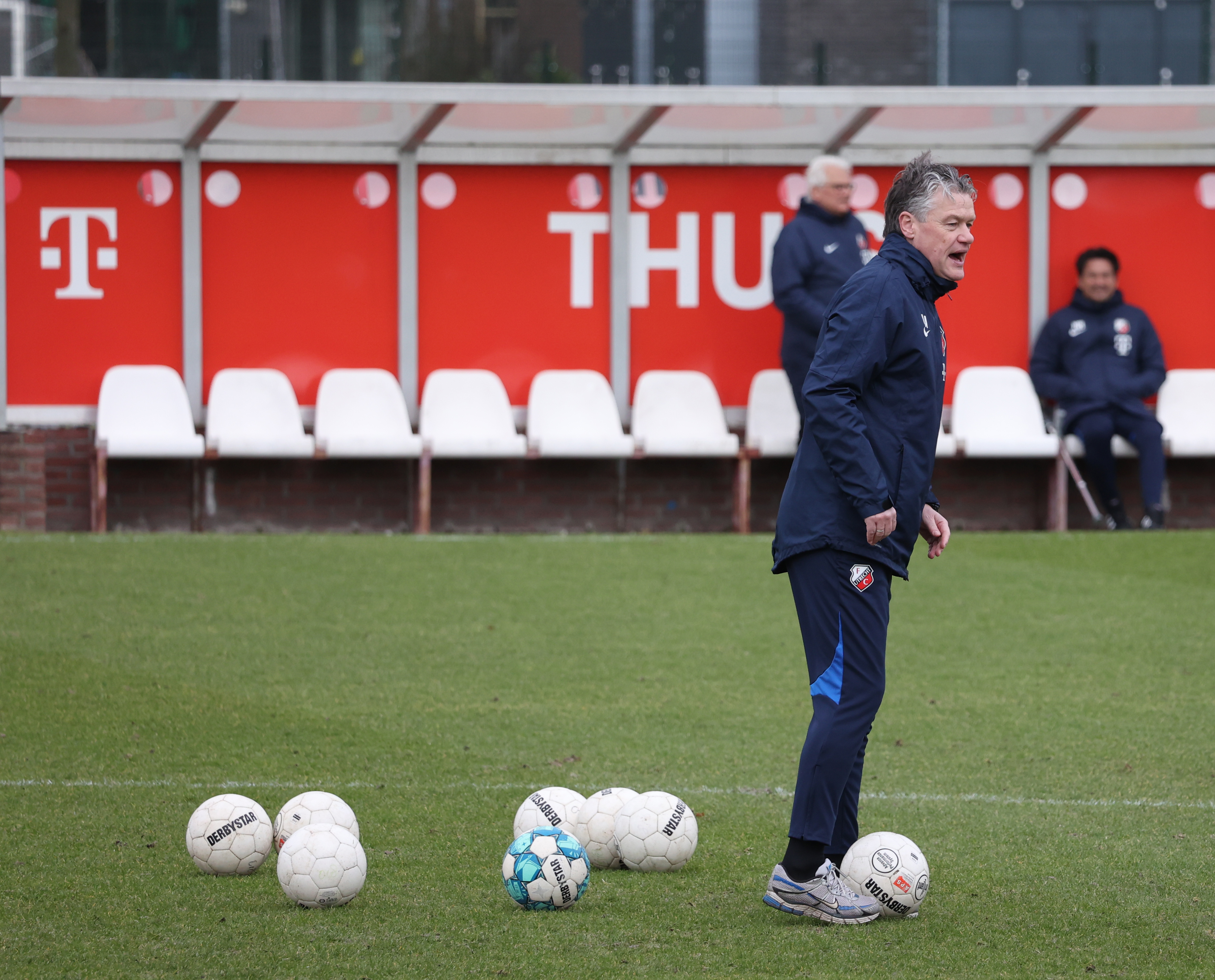
- Arts in 2023

Personal information
- Full name: Arnoldus Johannes Theodorus Arts
- Date of birth: 26 June 1969 (age 57)
- Place of birth: Groesbeek, Netherlands
- Height: 1.88 m (6 ft 2 in)
- Position: Midfielder

Youth career
- 1977–1985: Achilles '29
- 1985–1986: N.E.C.

Senior career*
| Years | Team | Apps | (Gls) |
| 1986–1991 | N.E.C. | 173 | (47) |
| 1991–1992 | FC Luzern | 20 | (0) |
| 1992–1994 | Twente | 58 | (7) |
| 1994–1997 | Cambuur | 101 | (24) |
| 1997–2001 | Willem II | 109 | (24) |
| 2000 | → N.E.C. (loan) | 11 | (1) |
| 2001–2003 | Utrecht | 26 | (0) |
| 2003–2005 | VVV-Venlo | 45 | (3) |
| Total | | 543 | (106) |

Managerial career
- 2007–2013: N.E.C. (youth)
- 2013–2016: Willem II (technical coach)
- 2015–2016: JVC Cuijk
- 2018–2019: Achilles '29
- 2019–2020: DFS
- 2019–2020: Jong Willem II
- 2020–2021: VV Rood Wit
- 2022–: Utrecht (youth)
- * Club domestic league appearances and goals

Arnoldus ("Arno") Johannes Theodorus Arts (born 26 June 1969) is a Dutch football coach and former player who played as a midfielder. He is currently the assistant coach of FC Utrecht's under-19 team.

== Playing career ==
Arno Arts, born on 26 June 1969 in the working-class neighborhood Het Vilje in Groesbeek, began his football journey playing street football before joining the local club Achilles '29 at the age of eight. At 16, he was scouted by Ger Reijnen and moved to NEC, where he made his professional debut on 17 August 1986 in a match against DS '79.

Arts enjoyed a distinguished career, playing for several clubs, including Swiss side FC Luzern, Twente, Cambuur, Willem II, Utrecht, and VVV-Venlo. He competed in European football with Twente, Willem II, and Utrecht, and had a particularly successful spell at Willem II, where he played in the UEFA Champions League and served as the club's long-time captain.

In total, Arts played 543 league matches, scoring 106 goals. Including European and cup competitions, his career tallied 655 appearances and 125 goals. His achievements included winning the Swiss Cup with FC Luzern.

== Coaching career ==
In 2008, Arts began a career in coaching, spending five years at the NEC/FC Oss academy, including four years with the under-19s and one with the under-17 team. Starting in the 2015–16 season, he coached JVC Cuijk in the Sunday Topklasse, signing a two-year contract in December 2014. Concurrently, he worked as a technical trainer at Willem II. However, he was dismissed by JVC Cuijk on 23 February 2016, and his contract with Willem II ended that summer.

In February 2018, Arts was appointed head coach of Achilles '29 for the remainder of the 2017–18 season, during which the team was relegated from the Tweede Divisie. In September 2018, he successfully sued the club to enforce the continuation of his contract as head coach.

From the 2019–20 season, Arts coached SV DFS and Jong Willem II. In the 2020–21 season, he managed VV Rood Wit from Breedeweg.

In January 2022, Arts joined Utrecht as a youth coach, and since held various positions within the club's academy.

== Personal life ==
His biography, Linkspoot, van 't Vilje tot Champions League, was published in October 2021.

== Honours ==
FC Luzern

- Swiss Cup: 1991–92

Utrecht

- KNVB Cup: 2002–03
