= 2014–15 Eerste Divisie =

59th season of the second-tier football league in Netherlands

Eerste Divisie
- Season: 2014–15

The 2014–15 Eerste Divisie, known as Jupiler League for sponsorship reasons, was the fifty-ninth season of Eerste Divisie since its establishment in 1955. It began in August 2014 with the first matches of the season and will end in May 2015 with the returns of the finals of the promotion/relegation play-offs, involving also the 16th- and 17th-placed teams from the 2014–15 Eredivisie.

== Teams ==
A total of 20 teams took part in the league. Willem II were promoted from the Eerste Divisie as 2013–14 champions and replaced by bottom-placed Eredivisie Roda JC Kerkrade, whereas Dordrecht and Excelsior won a top flight place in the nacompetitie, replacing NEC and RKC Waalwijk who were eliminated from the post-season playoff and therefore relegated to Eerste Divisie for this season.

=== Stadia and locations ===
Location of teams in the 2014–15 Eerste Divisie

| Club | Location | Venue | Capacity |
|---|---|---|---|
| Achilles '29 | Groesbeek | Sportpark De Heikant | 4,500 |
| Jong Ajax | Amsterdam | Sportpark De Toekomst | 4,000 |
| Almere City | Almere | Mitsubishi Forklift Stadion | 3,000 |
| Den Bosch | 's-Hertogenbosch | De Vliert | 9,000 |
| Eindhoven | Eindhoven | Jan Louwers Stadion | 4,600 |
| Emmen | Emmen | Univé Stadion | 8,600 |
| Fortuna Sittard | Sittard | Trendwork Arena | 12,500 |
| De Graafschap | Doetinchem | De Vijverberg | 12,600 |
| Helmond Sport | Helmond | Stadion De Braak | 4,100 |
| MVV | Maastricht | De Geusselt | 10,000 |
| NEC | Nijmegen | Stadion de Goffert | 12,500 |
| Oss | Oss | Heesen Yachts Stadion | 4,700 |
| Jong PSV | Eindhoven | Philips Stadion | 35,000 |
| RKC Waalwijk | Waalwijk | Mandemakers Stadion | 7,508 |
| Roda JC | Kerkrade | Parkstad Limburg Stadion | 18,936 |
| Sparta Rotterdam | Rotterdam | Het Kasteel | 11,026 |
| Telstar | Velsen | TATA Steel Stadion | 3,625 |
| Jong FC Twente | Enschede | De Grolsch Veste | 30,014 |
| Volendam | Volendam | Kras Stadion | 6,260 |
| VVV-Venlo | Venlo | De Koel | 8,000 |

=== Personnel and kits ===
| Club | Manager | Kit manufacturer | Sponsors |
|---|---|---|---|
| Achilles '29 | (Netherlands) François Gesthuizen | Klupp | Van Helden Relatiegeschenken |
| Jong Ajax | (Netherlands) Jaap Stam | Adidas | Ziggo |
| Almere City | (Netherlands) Fred Grim | Adidas | Van Wijnen |
| Den Bosch | (Netherlands) Ruud Kaiser | Macron | Van Wanrooij |
| Eindhoven | (Netherlands) Jean-Paul de Jong | Joma | VDL Groep |
| Emmen | (Netherlands) Joop Gall | Masita | Sunoil Biodiesel |
| Fortuna Sittard | (Netherlands) Peter van Vossen | Macron | Fitland |
| De Graafschap | (Netherlands) Jan Vreman | Quick | ATAG |
| Helmond Sport | (Netherlands) Jan van Dijk | Masita | Vescom |
| MVV | (Netherlands) Ron Elsen | Masita | Drink Water |
| NEC | (Netherlands) Ruud Brood | Patrick | Scholten Awater |
| Oss | (Netherlands) Willy Boessen | Masita | Clubmobiel |
| Jong PSV | (Bosnia and Herzegovina) Darije Kalezić | Nike | Philips |
| RKC Waalwijk | (Netherlands) Martin Koopman | Hummel | Mandemakers Keukens |
| Roda JC | (Netherlands) René Trost | Robey | Various* |
| Sparta Rotterdam | (Netherlands) Gert Kruys | Robey | Axidus |
| Telstar | (Netherlands) Michel Vonk | Hummel | Various* |
| Jong FC Twente | (Netherlands) Jan Zoutman | Nike | XXImo |
| Volendam | (Netherlands) Hans de Koning | Jako | VintyKids.com |
| VVV-Venlo | (Netherlands) Maurice Steijn | Masita | Seacon Logistics |

- Roda JC and Telstar are using match-day sponsorship system, so they have different sponsor every time they play.

== League table ==
| Pos | Team | Pld | W | D | L | GF | GA | GD | Pts | Promotion or qualification |
|---|---|---|---|---|---|---|---|---|---|---|
| 1 | N.E.C. (Note: N.E.C. won the first period and was league leader over the other three periods as well. Almere City, FC Oss and FC Eindhoven won the second, third and fourth period titles respectively, because they were league runners-up during those periods.) (C, P) | 38 | 33 | 2 | 3 | 107 | 32 | +75 | 101 | Promotion to the Eredivisie |
| 2 | Eindhoven | 38 | 26 | 2 | 10 | 70 | 39 | +31 | 80 | Qualification to promotion play-offs Second round (Note: Ten teams, two from the Eredivisie and eight from the Eerste Divisie, play for two spots in the 2015–16 Eredivisie, the remaining eight teams play in the 2015–16 Eerste Divisie. The season is subdivided into periods consisting of games 1–9, 10–18, 19–27 and 28–36. The top finisher in each period (that has not won a previous period) is a period winner and qualifies for the promotion play-offs first round even if they finish the season outside of the top nine.) |
| 3 | Roda JC Kerkrade (O, P) | 38 | 21 | 6 | 11 | 69 | 58 | +11 | 69 | Qualification to promotion play-offs Second round |
| 4 | Emmen | 38 | 19 | 10 | 9 | 88 | 57 | +31 | 67 | Qualification to promotion play-offs Second round |
| 5 | Volendam | 38 | 18 | 8 | 12 | 83 | 68 | +15 | 62 | Qualification to promotion play-offs Second round |
| 6 | De Graafschap (O, P) | 38 | 18 | 7 | 13 | 73 | 48 | +25 | 61 | Qualification to promotion play-offs First round |
| 7 | VVV-Venlo | 38 | 16 | 12 | 10 | 48 | 43 | +5 | 60 | Qualification to promotion play-offs First round |
| 8 | Sparta Rotterdam | 38 | 16 | 10 | 12 | 72 | 46 | +26 | 58 | |
| 9 | Oss | 38 | 17 | 5 | 16 | 73 | 67 | +6 | 56 | Qualification to promotion play-offs First round |
| 10 | Almere City | 38 | 13 | 9 | 16 | 64 | 63 | +1 | 48 | Qualification to promotion play-offs First round |
| 11 | MVV | 38 | 14 | 6 | 18 | 51 | 70 | −19 | 48 | |
| 12 | Jong Ajax (Note: Youth teams cannot be promoted and cannot participate in the promotion play-offs.) | 38 | 12 | 11 | 15 | 64 | 67 | −3 | 47 | |
| 13 | Jong FC Twente | 38 | 12 | 11 | 15 | 49 | 64 | −15 | 47 | |
| 14 | Jong PSV | 38 | 11 | 13 | 14 | 50 | 56 | −6 | 46 | |
| 15 | Telstar | 38 | 12 | 6 | 20 | 53 | 68 | −15 | 42 | |
| 16 | Den Bosch | 38 | 10 | 9 | 19 | 46 | 61 | −15 | 39 | |
| 17 | Helmond Sport | 38 | 10 | 8 | 20 | 52 | 85 | −33 | 38 | |
| 18 | Achilles '29 | 38 | 8 | 9 | 21 | 44 | 78 | −34 | 33 | |
| 19 | Fortuna Sittard | 38 | 7 | 8 | 23 | 30 | 72 | −42 | 29 | |
| 20 | RKC Waalwijk | 38 | 7 | 8 | 23 | 39 | 82 | −43 | 29 | |

Updated to match(es) played on 8 May 2015. Source: Soccerway
Rules for classification: 1) points; 2) goal difference; 3) number of goals scored
(C) Champions; (O) Play-off winners; (P) Promoted

=== Winners by period ===
- First period (Weeks 1–9): N.E.C.
- Second period (Weeks 10–18): Almere City
- Third period (Weeks 19-27): Oss
- Fourth period (Weeks 28-38): Eindhoven

== Attendances ==
| # | Club | Average |
|---|---|---|
| 1 | Roda | 10,711 |
| 2 | NEC | 9,577 |
| 3 | Sparta | 5,823 |
| 4 | De Graafschap | 4,927 |
| 5 | VVV | 4,300 |
| 6 | MVV | 4,233 |
| 7 | Emmen | 3,889 |
| 8 | Volendam | 3,876 |
| 9 | Den Bosch | 3,252 |
| 10 | Eindhoven | 2,914 |
| 11 | RKC | 2,840 |
| 12 | Fortuna | 2,568 |
| 13 | Helmond | 2,046 |
| 14 | Telstar | 1,942 |
| 15 | Achilles | 1,804 |
| 16 | Oss | 1,728 |
| 17 | Almere | 1,074 |
| 18 | Jong PSV | 653 |
| 19 | Jong Ajax | 599 |
| 20 | Jong Twente | 231 |
