= Laurens Rijnbeek =

Dutch footballer

Personal information
- Full name: Laurens Rijnbeek
- Date of birth: 22 May 1981 (age 45)
- Place of birth: Arnhem, Netherlands
- Position: Centre back

Youth career
- VDZ

Senior career*
Years	Team	Apps	(Gls)
- VDZ
–2006	RKHVV		
2006–2010	VV De Bataven		
2010–2014	Achilles '29	106	(2)
- * Club domestic league appearances and goals as of 13 January 2014

Laurens Rijnbeek (born 22 May 1981 in Arnhem) is a former footballer who played as a centre back for Achilles '29 in the Dutch Eerste Divisie. He formerly played for VDZ, RKHVV and VV De Bataven. The 2013–14 season was Rijnbeek's last for the Groesbeek side, because he wanted to spend more time with his family.
