= Thijs Hendriks =

Dutch footballer

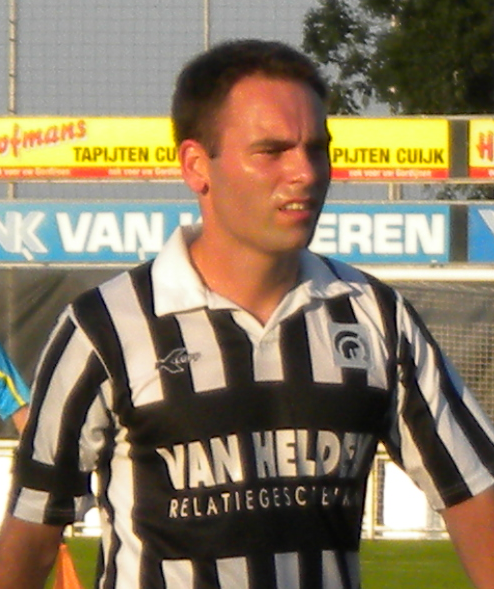

Personal information
- Full name: Thijs Hendriks
- Date of birth: 5 February 1985 (age 41)
- Place of birth: Malden, Netherlands
- Height: 1.80 m (5 ft 11 in)
- Position: Forward

Team information
- Current team: DVOL (Manager)

Youth career
- Juliana '31
- NEC

Senior career*
Years	Team	Apps	(Gls)
2004–2005	NEC	4	(1)
2005–2017	Achilles '29	184	(59)
2017	→ Spakenburg (loan)	8	(3)
2017–2018	DFS		
2018–2019	Juliana '31		

Managerial career
- 2020–2022: RKSV Brakkenstein
- 2022–2026: DVOL
- 2026–: De Treffers (assistant)
- * Club domestic league appearances and goals

Thijs Hendriks (born 5 February 1985) is a Dutch retired footballer who played as a forward.

== Club career ==
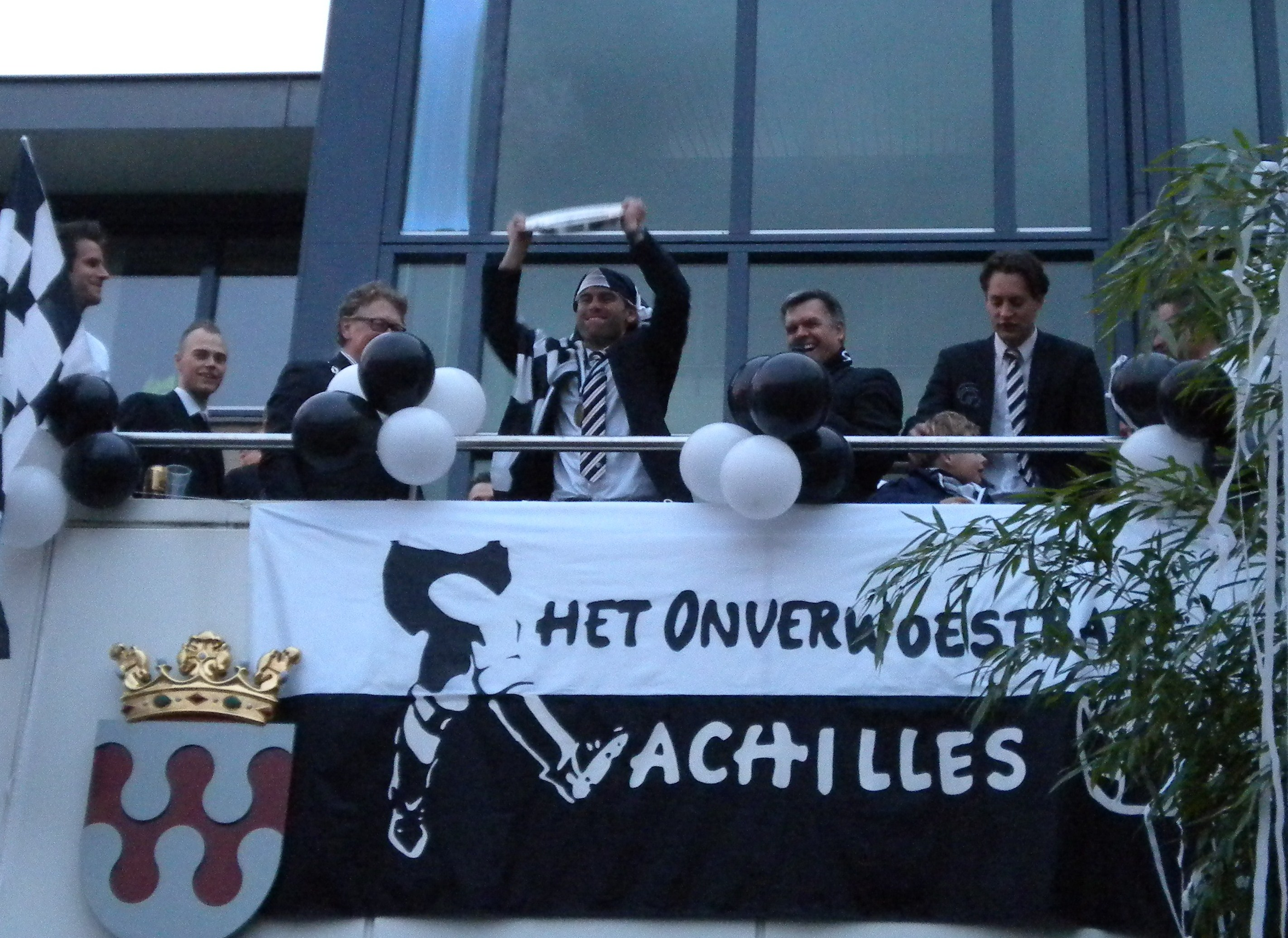
Hendriks celebrating winning the Topklasse in 2013

Hendriks kicked off his career with NEC in 2004. The following year he joined non-league Achilles '29. In his long spell with the club, it had many promotions, going to Eerste Divisie in 2013. In October 2014, he was appointed club captain, succeeding Twan Smits. In January 2017 Hendriks moved to Spakenburg, but due to an injury-plagued half year he joined DFS a couple of months later. In 2018 he returned to hometown club Juliana '31.

== Coaching career ==
In November 2019, Hendriks started his coaching career, as he was appointed manager of RKSV Brakkenstein from January 2020. At the end of December 2021 it was confirmed, that Hendriks would take charge of DVOL Lent from the upcoming 2021-22 season. He moved to De Treffers in summer 2026 to be an assistant to head coach Theo Janssen.

Sporting positions
Preceded by (Netherlands) Twan Smits	Achilles '29 captain 2014–	Succeeded by Incumbent
