= Jan van Deinsen =

Dutch footballer (born 1953)

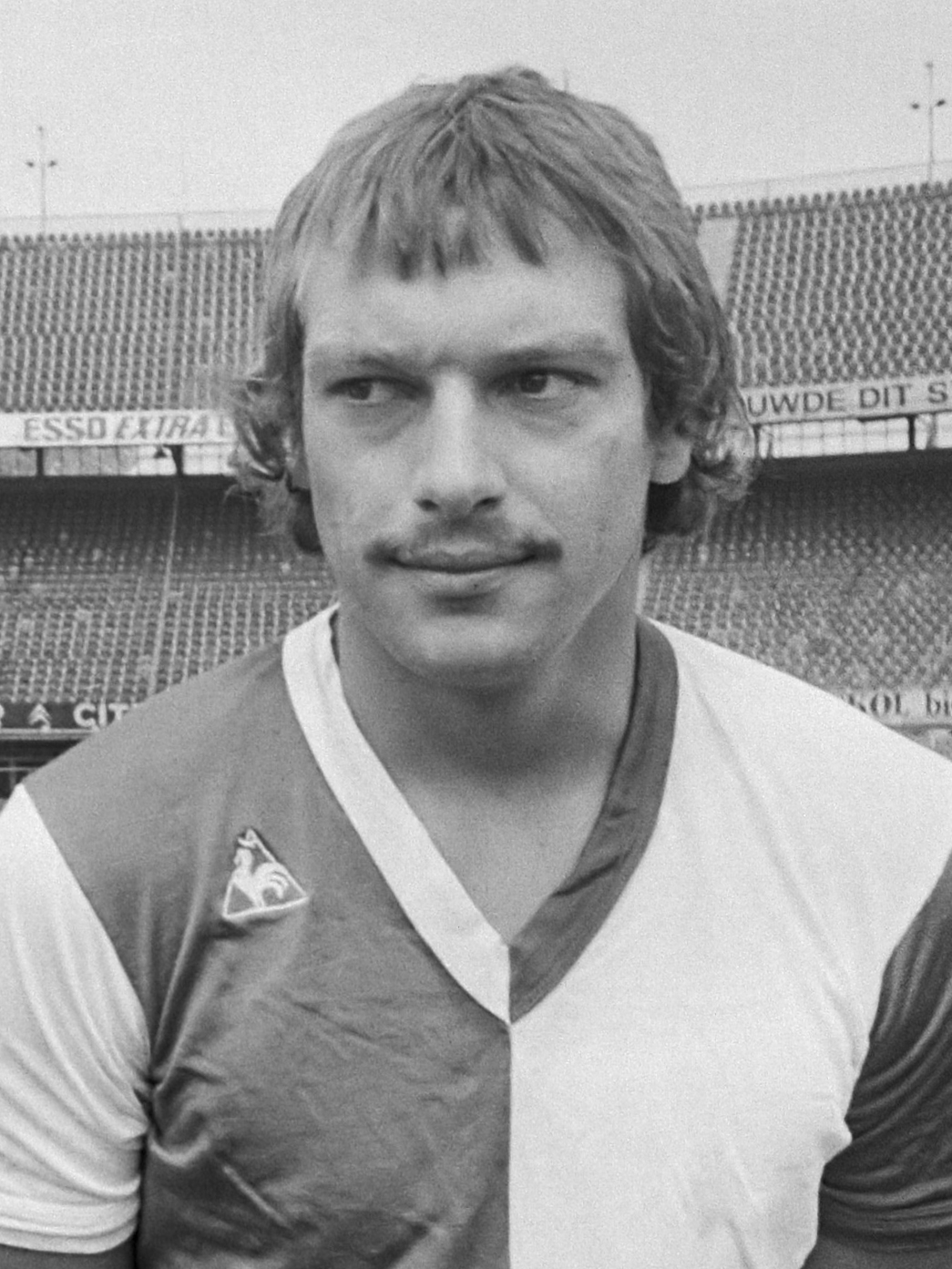
- van Deinsen in 1976

Personal information
- Date of birth: 19 June 1953 (age 73)
- Place of birth: Tiel, Netherlands
- Position: Left midfielder

Youth career
- TSV Theole
- NEC

Senior career*
Years	Team	Apps	(Gls)
1971–1974	NEC	59	(9)
1974–1976	Go Ahead Eagles	53	(7)
1976–1983	Feyenoord	164	(23)
Total		276	(39)

International career
1980	Netherlands U21	1	(1)
1980	Netherlands	1	(0)

Managerial career
- 1989–1990: Nigeria (assistant)
- 1990: Achilles '29
- 1991–1992: TOP Oss (assistant)
- 1995–1996: NAC (assistant)
- 1997–2000: TOP Oss (technical director)
- 2000–2002: Go Ahead Eagles (assistant)
- 2002–2003: Babberich
- 2003–2004: MVV
- 2004–2005: Vitesse (assistant)
- 2006–2008: Trinidad and Tobago (assistant)
- 2008–2009: JVC Cuijk
- 2009–2010: Vitesse (assistant)
- 2010–2012: JVC Cuijk
- 2012–2013: Achilles '29
- 2014–2016: DFS
- * Club domestic league appearances and goals

Jan van Deinsen (born 19 June 1953) is a Dutch former football player and manager who played as a left midfielder.

== Club career ==
van Deinsen was born in Tiel and grew up in Wamel, Gelderland. He made his professional debut for NEC on 12 September 1971 against Telstar and lost the Dutch Cup final with them to NAC. He also played for Go Ahead Eagles, before joining Dutch giants Feyenoord for whom he played for seven years. He won the 1979–80 KNVB Cup with the club, but he had to quit football in 1984 due to injuries of his achilles tendon.

== International career ==
Van Deinsen played once for the Netherlands national under-21 football team and also only obtained one cap for the Netherlands senior national team, when they lost to the Republic of Ireland on 10 September 1980 in Dublin.

== Managerial career ==
After retiring as a player, van Deinsen coached amateur sides Babberich and JVC Cuijk and was assistant at several professional clubs as well as to fellow Dutch managers Clemens Westerhof at Nigeria and Wim Rijsbergen at Trinidad and Tobago. In 2003 he was named manager of Eerste Divisie club MVV, only to leave them in February 2004. He had two spells as assistant manager at Vitesse.

He was appointed manager of Achilles '29 in July 2012 after leaving the amateurs of JVC Cuijk. He also coached DFS.

== Honours ==
Feyenoord

- KNVB Cup: 1979–80
