= Van Moorsel =

van Moorsel is a Dutch surname. Notable people with the surname include:

- Leontien van Moorsel (born 1970), Dutch cyclist
- Paco van Moorsel (born 1989), Dutch footballer
