= Thomas Verhaar =

Dutch footballer (born 1988)

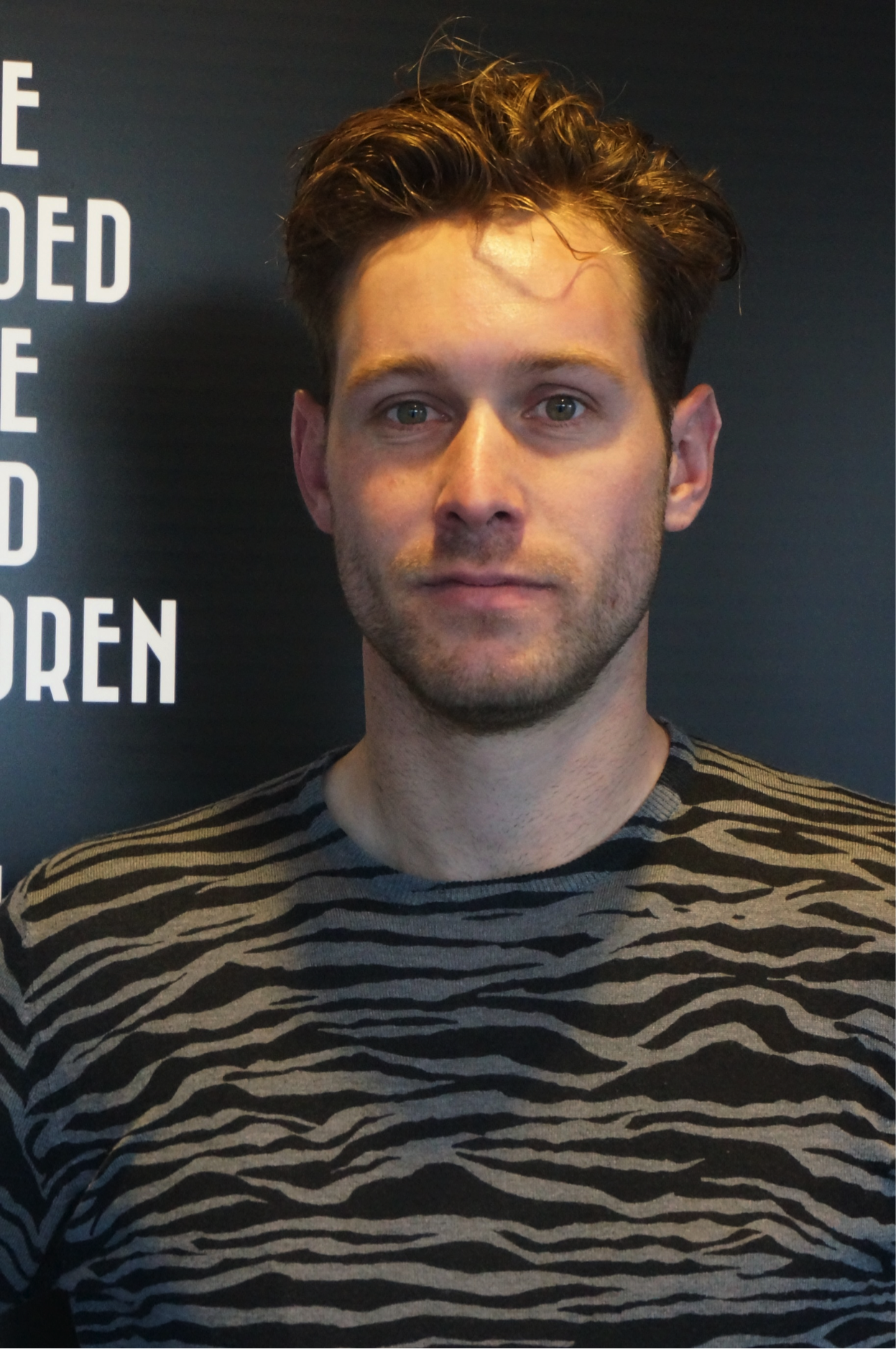
- Verhaar in 2015

Personal information
- Date of birth: 8 March 1988 (age 38)
- Place of birth: Rotterdam, Netherlands
- Height: 1.83 m (6 ft 0 in)
- Position: Winger

Youth career
- –2008: Sparta Rotterdam
- 2008–2010: Willem II

Senior career*
Years	Team	Apps	(Gls)
2010–2014	VOC		
2013	→ Houston Dutch Lions (loan)	9	(2)
2014–2019	Sparta Rotterdam	117	(36)
2019	Ajax Cape Town	12	(5)
2019–2021	Excelsior	38	(3)
2021–2022	AFC	31	(7)
2022–2023	VOC		
- * Club domestic league appearances and goals

Thomas Verhaar (born 8 March 1988) is a Dutch former professional footballer who played as a winger.

== Career ==
Verhaar played in the youth academy of Sparta Rotterdam and Willem II, before ending up at amateur club VOC. He played for the club for four years and made his senior debut there. During this period, he was also on a three-month loan with American club Houston Dutch Lions. In the summer of 2014, he was signed by Sparta Rotterdam, at that time playing in the second-tier Eerste Divisie. He made his debut on 10 August 2014 in a 2–1 home win over Den Bosch. Verhaar was in the starting lineup, but was replaced by Giovanni Hiwat during the match. During his second game he scored his first goal; away against Achilles '29 he made another start and secured the 1–3 final score in injury time. In the 2015–16 season, Verhaar won the Eerste Divisie title with Sparta, and as a result the club from the Spangen area returned to the Eredivisie after a six-year absence. At the end of the 2017–18 season, Sparta relegated to the Eerste Divisie again. There, Verhaar played another eight games before moving to South African club Ajax Cape Town in January 2019. He played there for six months. In June 2019, he returned to Rotterdam, this time to Excelsior where he signed a two-year contract.

On 7 April 2021, he agreed to join AFC for the 2021–22 season. After one season, he returned to his first senior club VOC, before retiring from football in 2023.

== Honours ==
Sparta Rotterdam

- Eerste Divisie: 2015–16
