= Twan Smits =

Dutch footballer

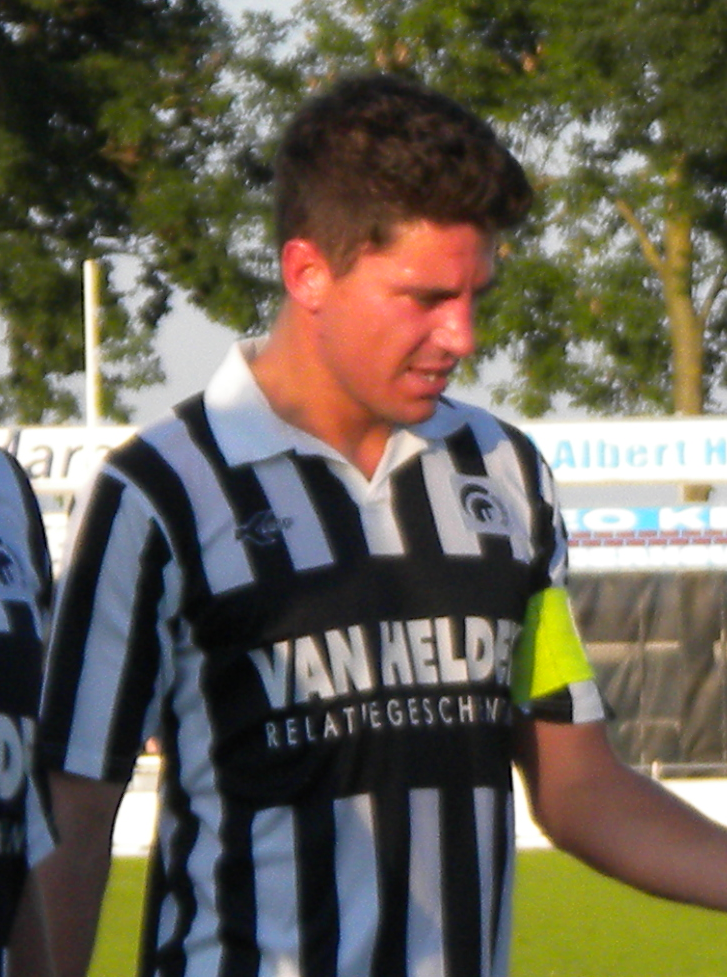
- Smits in 2014.

Personal information
- Full name: Twan Smits
- Date of birth: 20 December 1985 (age 40)
- Place of birth: Weurt, Netherlands
- Height: 1.77 m (5 ft 9 1/2 in)
- Position: Defensive midfielder

Team information
- Current team: Juliana '31

Youth career
- WVW Weurt
- N.E.C.
- De Treffers

Senior career*
Years	Team	Apps	(Gls)
2004–2009	Juliana '31		
2009–2015	Achilles '29	136	(2)
2015–2017	De Treffers	47	(4)
2017–	Juliana '31		
- * Club domestic league appearances and goals as of 11 February 2017

Twan Smits (born 20 December 1985 in Weurt) is a footballer who plays as a defensive midfielder for Juliana '31 in the Dutch Derde Divisie. Smits also is the captain of the Groesbeek side since 2011. Originally a youth product from N.E.C., he played first team football for Juliana '31 for five years before moving to Achilles '29 in the 2009 summer. Smits also works as an account manager for former youth club and Eredivisie side N.E.C.
