= Paco van Moorsel =

Dutch footballer

Personal information
- Date of birth: 15 December 1989 (age 36)
- Place of birth: Veldhoven, Netherlands
- Height: 1.85 m (6 ft 1 in)
- Position: Attacking midfielder

Youth career
- RKSV Boxtel

Senior career*
Years	Team	Apps	(Gls)
2006–2012	Den Bosch	142	(29)
2012–2015	Groningen	8	(0)
2013–2014	→ Cambuur (loan)	23	(1)
2014–2015	→ NEC (loan)	18	(1)
2015–2018	Sparta Rotterdam	65	(14)
2018–2019	Go Ahead Eagles	38	(6)
2019–2021	Den Bosch	45	(8)
- * Club domestic league appearances and goals as of 7 May 2021

Paco van Moorsel (born 15 December 1989) is a Dutch footballer who plays as an attacking midfielder.

== Career ==
Van Moorsel played six seasons for FC Den Bosch in the Eerste Divisie before he joined FC Groningen in the summer of 2012. He was sent on loan to SC Cambuur during the 2013–14 season and again to NEC the following season.

On 26 June 2019, FC Den Bosch announced, that van Moorsel had returned to the club on a 2-year contract with an option for one further year.

== Honours ==
=== Club ===
N.E.C.

- Eerste Divisie: 2014–15

Sparta Rotterdam

- Eerste Divisie: 2015–16
