= Mart Dijkstra =

Dutch footballer

Personal information
- Date of birth: 10 August 1990 (age 36)
- Place of birth: Delfzijl, Netherlands
- Height: 1.83 m (6 ft 0 in)
- Position: Midfielder

Youth career
- –2002: VV Appingedam
- 2002–2010: Groningen

Senior career*
Years	Team	Apps	(Gls)
2010–2011	Harkemase Boys	25	(0)
2011–2015	Cambuur	64	(2)
2015–2017	Sparta	63	(0)
2017–2020	NEC	97	(1)
2020–2026	Harkemase Boys	99	(4)
- * Club domestic league appearances and goals as of 11 January 2025

Mart Dijkstra (born 10 August 1990) is a Dutch retired footballer who plays as a midfielder.

== Club career ==
He started his senior career with Harkemase Boys and then moved to SC Cambuur, whom he left in 2015 after four years with the club. In summer 2017, Dijkstra was snapped up by NEC. He returned to his first club Harkemase Boys in October 2020. He announced his retirement in February 2026.

== Honours ==
=== Club ===
SC Cambuur

- Eerste Divisie: 2012–13

Sparta Rotterdam

- Eerste Divisie: 2015-16
