= Ruud Kaiser =

Dutch footballer and manager (born 1960)

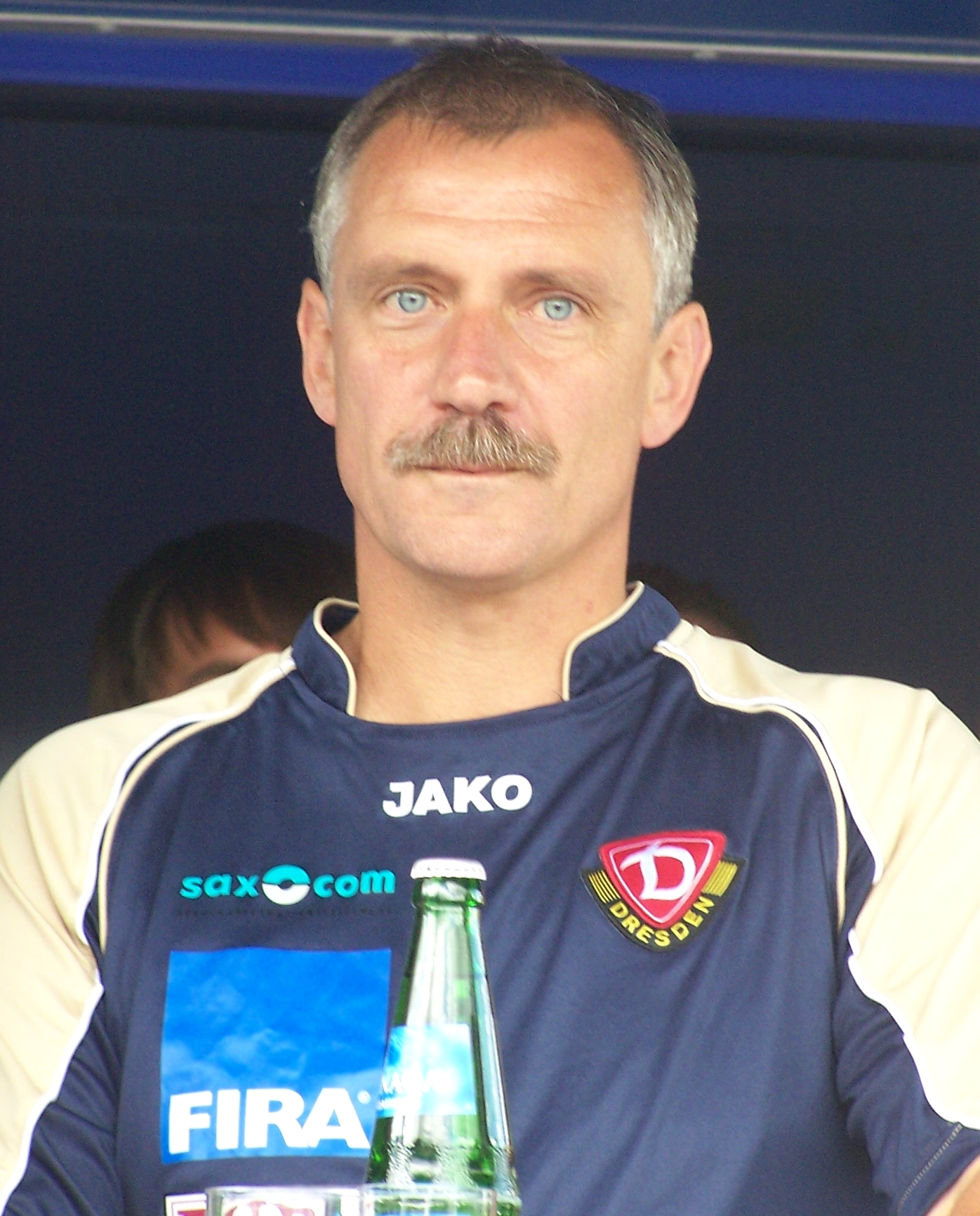
- Kaiser with Dresden in 2008.

Personal information
- Full name: Rudolph Hendrick Kaiser
- Date of birth: 26 December 1960 (age 65)
- Place of birth: Amsterdam, Netherlands
- Position: Midfielder

Team information
- Current team: Helmond Sport (youth)

Youth career
- SV Slikkerveer
- Excelsior
- VV CEC
- Emmen
- Go Ahead Eagles
- Ajax

Senior career*
Years	Team	Apps	(Gls)
1978–1980	Ajax	9	(2)
1980–1981	Antwerp	39	(10)
1981–1982	Coventry City	16	(3)
1982–1984	Nice	37	(6)
1984–1988	FC Den Bosch	128	(20)
1988–1989	SVV	25	(6)
1989–1991	Witgoor Sport		

International career
1976	Netherlands U16	2	(0)
1977–1978	Netherlands U18/19	13	(8)
1976	Netherlands U21	7	(0)

Managerial career
- 1998–1999: RBC
- 2001–2006: Netherlands U17
- 2006–2007: Chelsea U18
- 2008–2009: Dynamo Dresden
- 2010–2011: 1. FC Magdeburg
- 2013–2015: FC Den Bosch
- 2016–2018: JVC Cuijk
- 2018–2019: Dongen
- 2020–2021: Achilles '29
- * Club domestic league appearances and goals

Ruud Kaiser (born 26 December 1960) is a Dutch football manager, coach and former player who played as a midfielder. He is currently the coach of Helmond Sport's under-19 team.

== Playing career ==
Born in Amsterdam, Kaiser began his career with his hometown club, Ajax, before leaving in 1980 to join Antwerp. He would later play for Coventry City and Nice before returning to the Netherlands with FC Den Bosch and SVV. He ended his career in Belgium with KFC Dessel Sport.

Kaiser also represented the Netherlands at under-16, Netherlands under-18/19, and under-21 level.

== Coaching career ==
Kaiser then moved into coaching, where he has earned a reputation as a specialist at spotting and working with young players. Kaiser spent seven years at TOP Oss, working in a variety of sporting development roles, before taking on his first managerial responsibilities at RBC, whom he managed from 1998 to 1999. He then moved to the Royal Dutch Football Association, where he initially served as assistant manager to the Olympic team, who were unable to qualify for the 2000 Olympics. In 2001, he took over as head coach of the Netherlands under-17 team, where he had his greatest successes. Working with future stars such as Rafael van der Vaart, Robin van Persie, Nigel de Jong, Arjen Robben and Wesley Sneijder, he led the team to runner-up spot in the 2005 UEFA European Under-17 Football Championship and third place in the 2005 FIFA U-17 World Championship. During this time he also headed up international scouting for the Dutch FA.

From 2006 to 2007 Kaiser was coach of the Chelsea Academy, and was appointed as Dynamo Dresden manager in July 2008, replacing Eduard Geyer who was fired on 4 October 2009.

Dynamo struggled for the first half of Kaiser's first season in charge, with the team generally performing well, but unable to convert this into goals. Things picked up in the second half of the season, though, and the team finished in a respectable position in the top half of the 3. Liga table. However, the following season also started badly, and in October, with six defeats in the first twelve games, Dynamo found themselves in the relegation zone, and Kaiser was sacked.

In April 2010, Kaiser signed a two-year contract with Regionalliga Nord side 1. FC Magdeburg, taking over managerial duties on 1 July 2010. He became the club's first foreign manager and was tasked with assembling a squad capable of achieving promotion in the 2011–12 season. However, following a series of poor results that left the team close to relegation, he was dismissed on 17 March 2011 and replaced by Wolfgang Sandhowe.

After serving as technical director of Lierse for two years, Kaiser returned to a managerial role by signing with Eerste Divisie side FC Den Bosch in July 2013. He was dismissed on 3 February 2015 due to disappointing results, with the club in 13th place at the time. In 2016, it was announced that Kaiser would become the head coach of JVC Cuijk, a team competing in the Derde Divisie. He later coached Dongen during the 2018–19 season. Beginning with the 2020–21 season, he managed Achilles '29 in the Hoofdklasse but was dismissed on 6 October 2021.

In 2022, Kaiser returned to youth coaching and joined the academy of Helmond Sport, where he took on several roles.

== Managerial statistics ==
As of match played 12 May 2019

Managerial record by team and tenure
Team	From	To	Record								Ref.
Team	From	To	G	W	D	L	GF	GA	GD	Win %	Ref.
RBC	1 January 1998	30 June 1999	51	15	13	23	75	95	−20	29.41	
Dynamo Dresden	1 July 2008	4 October 2009	51	16	14	21	55	63	−8	31.37	
1. FC Magdeburg	1 July 2010	17 March 2011	23	6	6	11	24	33	−9	26.09	
FC Den Bosch	1 July 2013	3 February 2015	63	24	13	26	90	108	−18	38.10	
JVC Cuijk	1 July 2016	30 June 2018	65	23	12	30	99	115	−16	35.38	
Dongen	1 July 2018	30 June 2019	31	13	3	15	48	61	−13	41.94	
Total			284	97	61	126	391	475	−84	34.15	—

== Honours ==
Ajax

- Eredivisie: 1978–79
- KNVB Cup: 1978–79
