= Daan Paau =

Dutch footballer

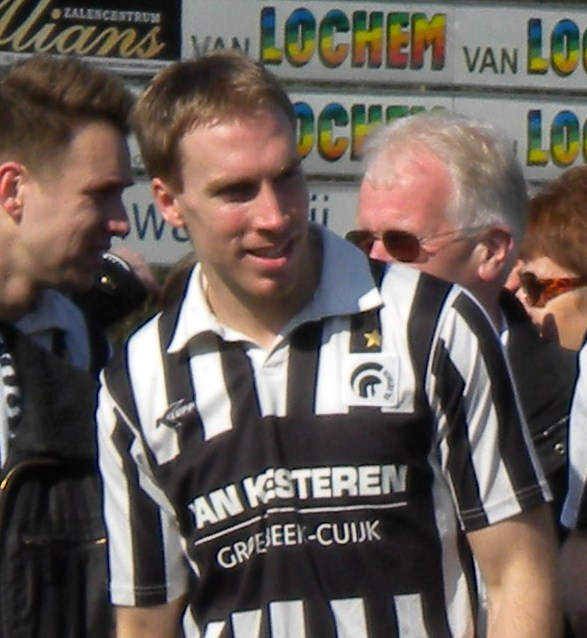

Personal information
- Full name: Daan Paau
- Date of birth: 11 November 1985 (age 40)
- Place of birth: Heumen, Netherlands
- Height: 1.79 m (5 ft 10 1/2 in)
- Position: Midfielder

Team information
- Current team: SV AWC

Youth career
- SV Heumen
- Vitesse Arnhem
- SV Heumen

Senior career*
Years	Team	Apps	(Gls)
- SV Heumen
–2011	SV AWC		
2011–2016	Achilles '29	68	(23)
- * Club domestic league appearances and goals as of 5 June 2016

Daan Paau (born 11 November 1985 in Heumen) is a footballer who plays as a midfielder for SV AWC.

He is a youth product from local side SV Heumen and Vitesse Arnhem, but didn't succeed at the latter due to an injury. Paau formerly played first team football for SV Heumen Achilles '29.
