= Mischa Boelens =

Curacaoan footballer

Personal information
- Date of birth: 23 February 1995 (age 31)
- Place of birth: Curacao
- Height: 1.66 m (5 ft 5 in)
- Position: Right back

Youth career
- VV Eldenia
- –2005: ESA Rijkerswoerd
- 2005–2007: Vitesse/AGOVV Apeldoorn
- 2007–2010: ESA Rijkerswoerd
- 2010–2014: NEC/FC Oss
- 2014–2015: De Graafschap

Senior career*
Years	Team	Apps	(Gls)
2015–2017	Achilles '29	33	(0)
2017–2018	DUNO		
2018–2019	MASV		
Total		33	(0)
- * Club domestic league appearances and goals

Mischa Boelens (born 23 February 1995) is a Curaçaoan former footballer who plays as a right back. He also holds Dutch citizenship.

== Club career ==
He made his professional debut in the Eerste Divisie for Achilles '29 on 7 August 2015 in a game against Jong Ajax.
