= Eric Meijers =

Dutch football manager (born 1963)

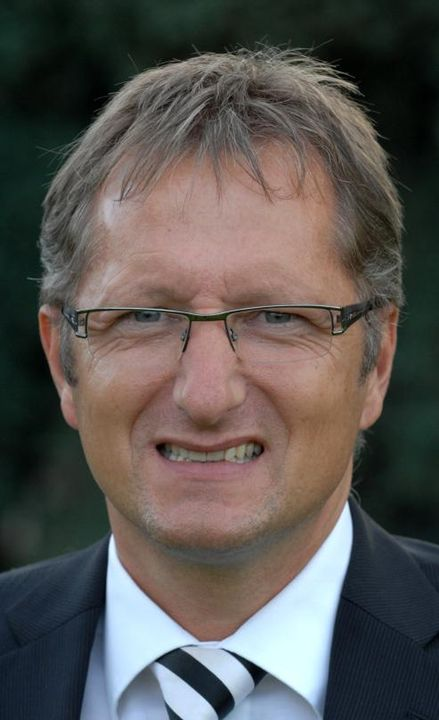

Personal information
- Date of birth: 6 August 1963 (age 63)
- Place of birth: Nijmegen, Netherlands

Team information
- Current team: TEC (head coach)

Senior career*
Years	Team	Apps	(Gls)
?–1983	NEC		
1983–1991	SV Hatert		

Managerial career
- 1992–1999: SV Hatert
- 1999–2002: RKHVV
- 2002–2012: Achilles '29
- 2012–2013: Helmond Sport
- 2014–2015: JVC Cuijk
- 2015–2018: Achilles '29
- 2018–2019: VVSB
- 2019–2021: SV Spakenburg
- 2024: DUNO
- 2024–: TEC
- * Club domestic league appearances and goals

Eric Meijers (born 6 August 1963) is a Dutch professional football manager and former player who is the head coach of Derde Divisie club TEC.

== Coaching career ==
Meijers is mostly known for his ten-year spell as head coach of Achilles '29, which he turned into a mainstay of Dutch amateur football and a national Topklasse in 2012, for which he was awarded the Rinus Michels Award as best amateur coach of the year.

His successes in 2012 won him interest from Eerste Divisie professionals Helmond Sport, who hired him as new head coach for the 2012–13 season in a one-year contract. Thanks also to five wins in the first five games of the seasons, Helmond ended the season in an impressive fourth place, but was defeated by Sparta Rotterdam in the promotion playoffs. Meijers could not repeat his positive performances in the following seasons, as he was dismissed in September 2013 due to poor results after a home loss to Almere City FC.

In January 2014, it was announced Meijers would return into amateur football, replacing Hans Kraay, Jr. at ambitious Topklasse club JVC Cuijk, effective from the following 2014–15 season.

On 9 November 2014, it was announced that he would return to Achilles '29 after the season to succeed François Gesthuizen, who had made the move to professional football. In 2017, he relegated with Achilles '29 to the Tweede Divisie. After the club struggled with bankruptcy for its professional and first team refused to practice, Meijers immediately stepped down from his position on 11 January 2018. Meijers gained national fame in September 2018 because of a trailer for the documentary Voetbal is oorlog (Football is war) about the relegation year with Achilles '29.

Starting November 2018 he began coaching VVSB. He left the position on 14 November 2019 to become the manager of Tweede Divisie club SV Spakenburg. On 8 November 2021, Meijers was sacked by Spakenburg, with the club sitting in seventeenth position in the Tweede Divisie.

On 8 November 2022, Meijers was appointed assistant coach to Hans van de Haar at Tweede Divisie club TEC. In March 2024, it was announced that he would become head coach of Eerste Klasse club DUNO for the 2024–25 season. However, just months into his role at DUNO, Meijers returned to TEC in November 2024 to replace Eric Speelziek as head coach.
