= Breedeweg =

- Village
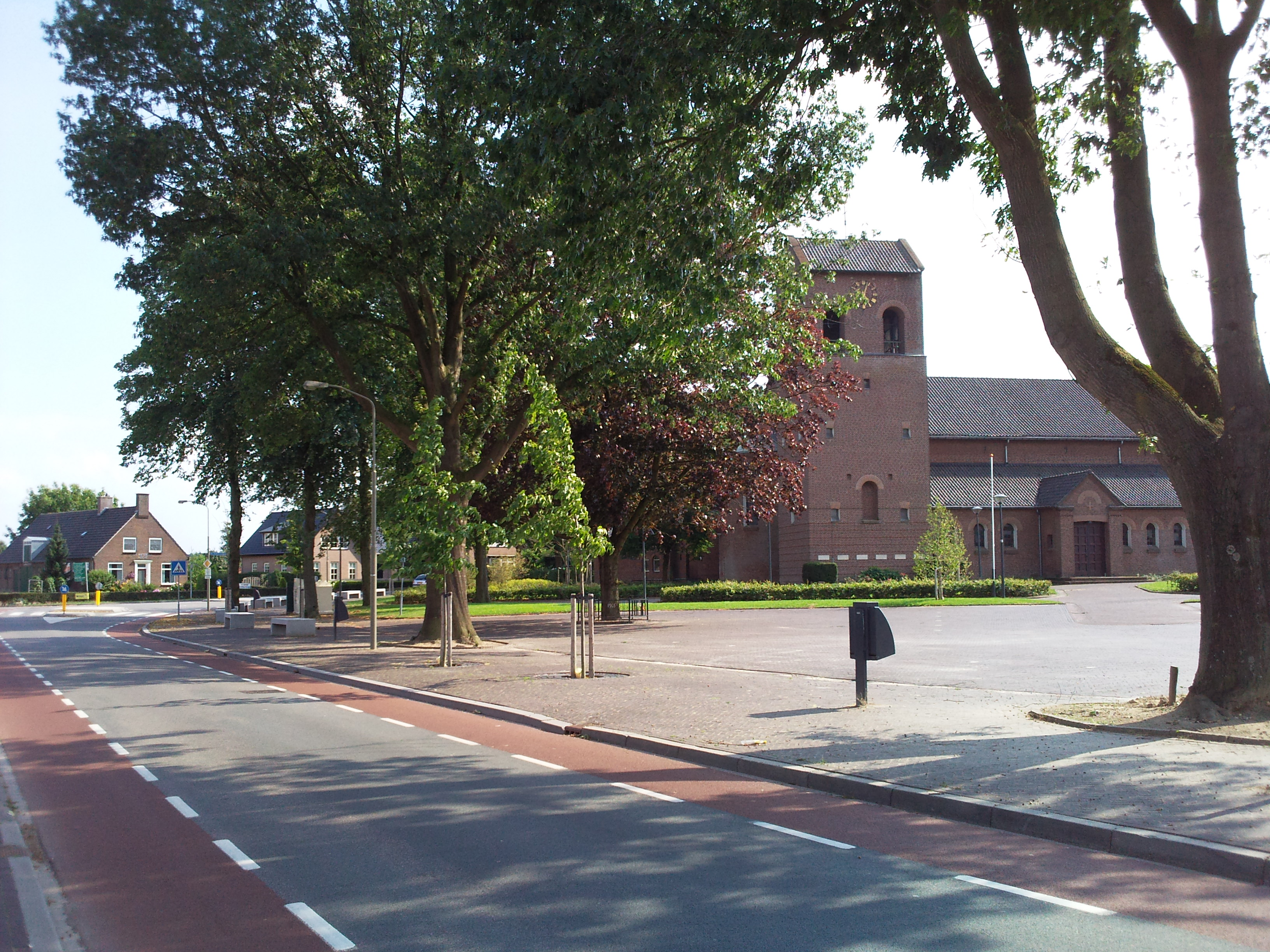
- St. Antonius church

- Location in the province of Gelderland Breedeweg (Netherlands)
- Coordinates: 51.7578°N 5.9402°E
- Country: Netherlands
- Province: Gelderland
- Municipality: Berg en Dal

Area
  - Total: 5.45 km^{2} (2.10 sq mi)
- Elevation: 37 m (121 ft)

Population (2021)
  - Total: 2,570
  - Density: 472/km^{2} (1,220/sq mi)
- Time zone: UTC+1 (CET)
  - Summer (DST): UTC+2 (CEST)
- Postal code: 6562
- Dialing code: 024

Breedeweg (Dutch pronunciation: [ˈbreːdəʋɛx]) is a village in the Dutch province of Gelderland. It is located in the municipality of Berg en Dal, about 1 km south of Groesbeek.

It was first mentioned in 1899 as Breedeweg, and means "wide road". The St. Antonius Church was built in 1934, and destroyed in 1944 during Operation Market Garden. In 1949, the church was rebuilt, and a monument has been erected for the dead allied soldiers and the two civilians who were killed by a grenade while cleaning up the debris.

Breedeweg and Groesbeek have been expanding, and are now close to one-another. In the late 2010s, the municipality changed the place name sign to "Groesbeek Breedeweg". Nevertheless, it is still a separate village and not annexed.

== Gallery ==
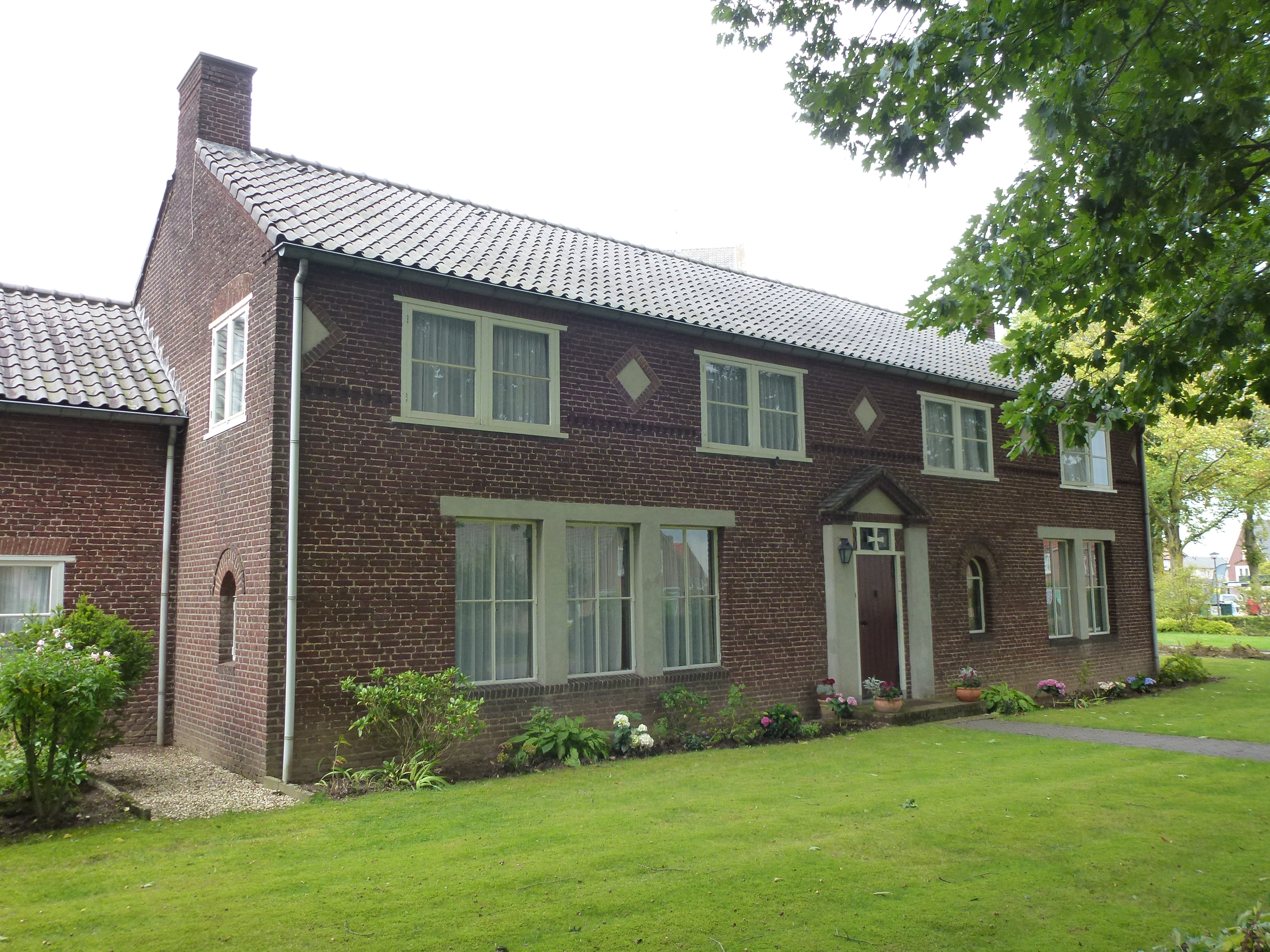
Former clergy house

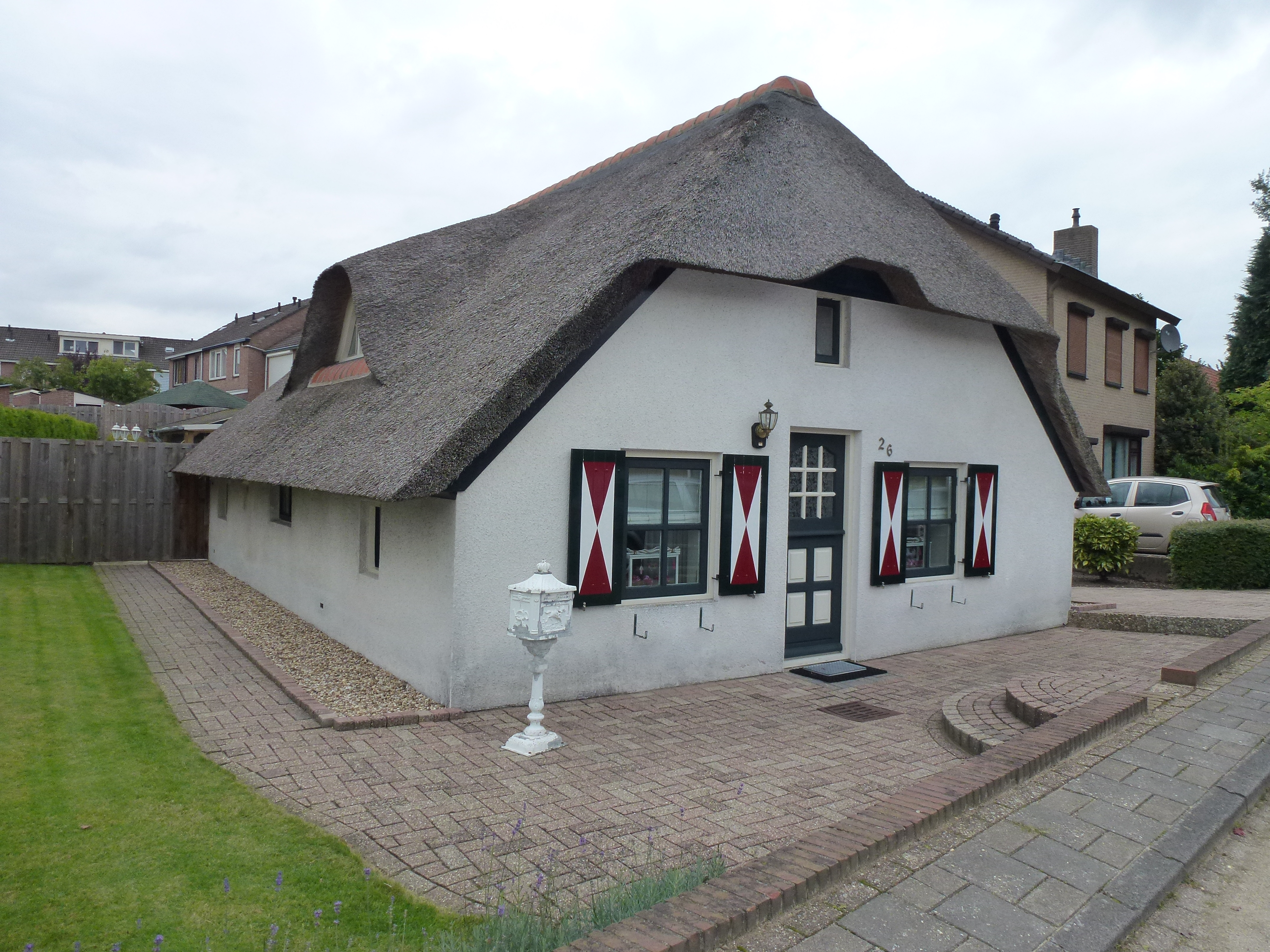
Farm in Breedeweg

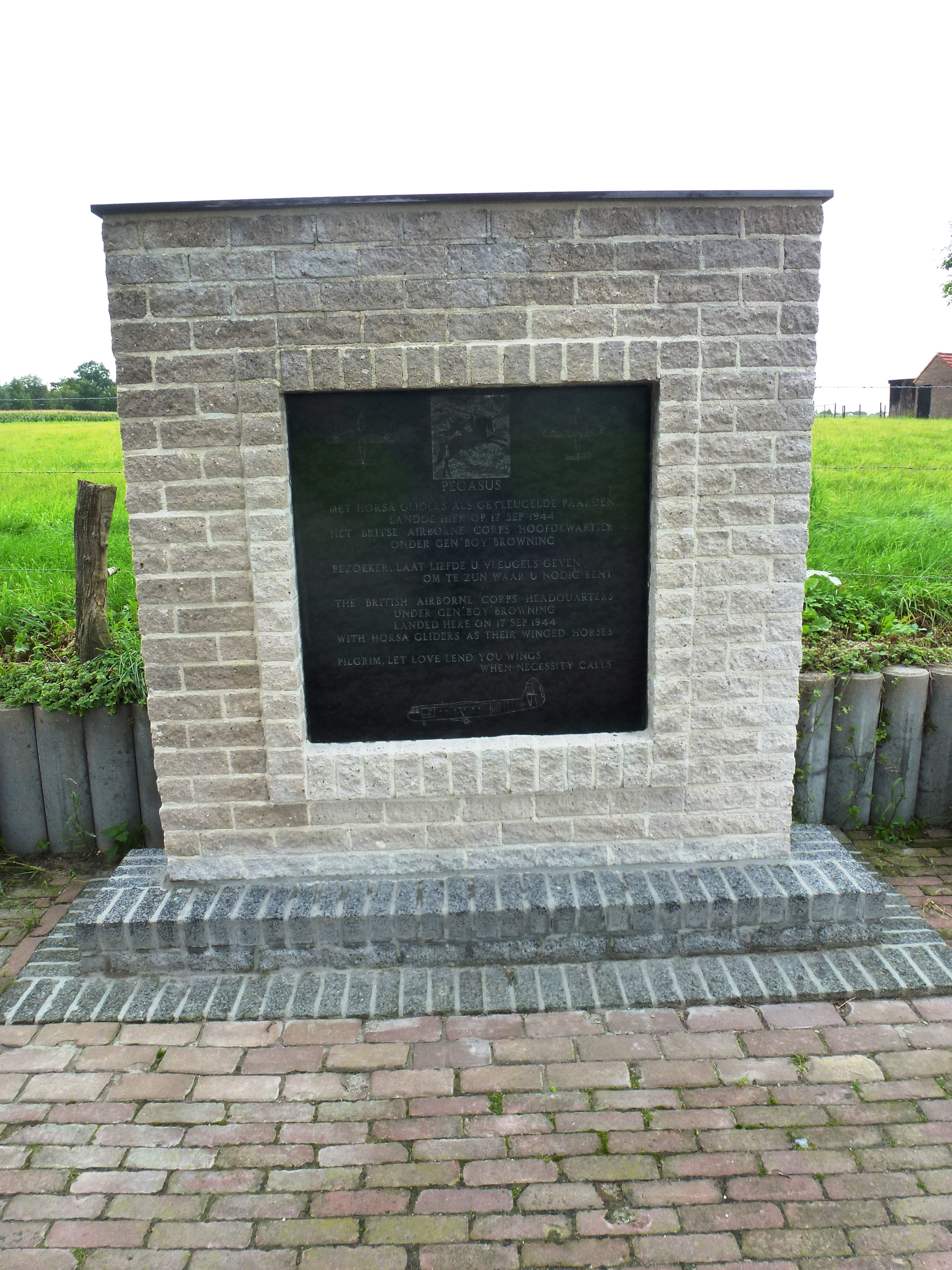
War memorial Pegasus
