= Soufiane Laghmouchi =

Moroccan footballer

Personal information
- Full name: Soufiane Laghmouchi
- Date of birth: 10 August 1990 (age 36)
- Place of birth: Barneveld, Netherlands
- Height: 1.79 m (5 ft 10 in)
- Position: Winger

Team information
- Current team: Sportlust '46
- Number: 8

Youth career
- Vitesse/AGOVV

Senior career*
Years	Team	Apps	(Gls)
2010–2013	AGOVV	67	(6)
2013–2014	Volendam	44	(11)
2014–2015	Emmen	28	(3)
2015–2016	Volendam	28	(4)
2016–2017	AFC Eskilstuna	0	(0)
2017–2020	GVVV	81	(19)
2020–2021	TEC	2	(0)
2021–2023	Scherpenzeel	15	(7)
2023–	Sportlust '46	15	(2)

International career
2010	Morocco U23	7	(3)
- * Club domestic league appearances and goals as of 12:21, 16 March 2024 (UTC)

Soufiane Laghmouchi (born 10 August 1990) is a footballer who plays as a winger for Derde Divisie club Sportlust '46. He formerly played for AGOVV Apeldoorn, FC Emmen and FC Volendam. Born in the Netherlands, he represented Morocco at under-23 international level.

== Club career ==
Laghmouchi, who was born in Barneveld, Netherlands, started playing football in the youth department of Vitesse/AGOVV, a cooperation between the youth departments of Vitesse Arnhem and AGOVV. In 2010, he earned a professional contract. On 13 August 2010, he made his debut in professional football as a part of the AGOVV squad against Fortuna Sittard. AGOVV won the match 3–1. After the bankruptcy of AGOVV Apeldoorn, Laghmouchi signed with FC Volendam until the end of the season. In July 2014 he signed a 1-year contract with Dutch football club FC Emmen.

== International career ==
Laghmouchi was called up for the Moroccan Olympic squad on 28 September 2010 by new coach Dutchman Pim Verbeek and he decided not to accept possible future call ups by the Netherlands football federation.
