= 2015–16 Eerste Divisie =

60th season of the second-tier football league in Netherlands

Eerste Divisie
- Season: 2015–16
- Champions: Sparta Rotterdam
- Promoted: Sparta Rotterdam; Go Ahead Eagles

The 2015–16 Eerste Divisie, known as Jupiler League for sponsorship reasons, is the sixtieth season of Eerste Divisie since its establishment in 1955. It began in August 2015 with the first matches of the season and ended in May 2016 with the finals of the promotion/relegation play-offs, also involving the 16th- and 17th-placed teams from the 2015–16 Eredivisie.

This season was the last where promotion and relegation was optional. No club was relegated to the new third-tier division Tweede Divisie (Second Division). This change in the league system was approved in a KNVB assembly in December 2014. Thus, the Topklasse and leagues below it were reduced by one level, and furthermore, promotion and relegation between the Eerste Divisie and Tweede Divisie became mandatory from 2016–17.

== Teams ==
A total of 19 teams took part in the league. 2014–15 Eerste Divisie champion NEC gained promotion to the Eredivisie, and was replaced by Dordrecht, which finished last in the 2014–15 Eredivisie. Roda JC Kerkrade and De Graafschap won the post-season playoff, and were replaced in the 2015–16 Eerste Divisie by NAC Breda and Go Ahead Eagles. No teams were relegated, but Jong FC Twente voluntarily withdrew from the league.

Location of teams in the Eerste Divisie 2015-2016

Club	Location	Venue	Capacity
Achilles '29	Groesbeek	Sportpark De Heikant	4,500
Jong Ajax	Amsterdam	Sportpark De Toekomst	4,000
Almere City	Almere	Mitsubishi Forklift Stadion	3,000
Den Bosch	's-Hertogenbosch	De Vliert	9,000
Dordrecht	Dordrecht	GN Bouw Stadion	4,088
Eindhoven	Eindhoven	Jan Louwers Stadion	4,600
Emmen	Emmen	Univé Stadion	8,600
Fortuna Sittard	Sittard	Trendwork Arena	12,500
Go Ahead Eagles	Deventer	Adelaarshorst	8,000
Helmond Sport	Helmond	Stadion De Braak	4,100
MVV	Maastricht	De Geusselt	10,000
NAC Breda	Breda	Rat Verlegh Stadion	19,000
Oss	Oss	Heesen Yachts Stadion	4,700
Jong PSV	Eindhoven	De Herdgang	2,500
RKC Waalwijk	Waalwijk	Mandemakers Stadion	7,508
Sparta Rotterdam	Rotterdam	Het Kasteel	11,026
Telstar	Velsen	TATA Steel Stadion	3,625
Volendam	Volendam	Kras Stadion	6,260
VVV-Venlo	Venlo	De Koel	8,000

=== Personnel and kits ===
Club	Manager	Kit manufacturer	Sponsors
Achilles '29	(Netherlands) Eric Meijers	Klupp	Van Helden Relatiegeschenken
Jong Ajax	(Netherlands) Jaap Stam	Adidas	Ziggo
Almere City	(Netherlands) Jack de Gier	Adidas	Van Wijnen
Den Bosch	(Netherlands) René van Eck	Macron	Van Wanrooij
Dordrecht	(Netherlands) Harry van den Ham	Macron	Riwal Hoogwerkers
Eindhoven	(Netherlands) Mitchell van der Gaag	Joma	VDL Groep
Emmen	(Netherlands) Gert Heerkes	Robey	Q&S Gartendeco
Fortuna Sittard	(Netherlands) Ben van Dael	Macron	Fitland
Go Ahead Eagles	(Netherlands) Hans de Koning	Hummel	Drukwerkdeal
Helmond Sport	(Netherlands) Remond Strijbosch	Hummel	Vescom
MVV	(Netherlands) Ron Elsen	Masita	Drink Water
NAC	(Netherlands) Marinus Dijkhuizen	Legea	cm. Payments
Oss	(Netherlands) Reinier Robbemond	Erima	NGSN
Jong PSV	(Netherlands) Pascal Jansen	Umbro	Philips
RKC Waalwijk	(Netherlands) Peter van den Berg	Hummel	Mandemakers Keukens
Sparta Rotterdam	(Netherlands) Alex Pastoor	Robey	Axidus
Telstar	(Netherlands) Michel Vonk	Hummel	MPM Oil
Volendam	(Netherlands) Robert Molenaar	Jako	HSB
VVV-Venlo	(Netherlands) Maurice Steijn	Masita	Seacon Logistics

== League table ==
Pos	Team	Pld	W	D	L	GF	GA	GD	Pts	Promotion, qualification or relegation
1	Sparta Rotterdam (C, P)	36	24	7	5	83	40	+43	79	Promotion to the Eredivisie
2	VVV-Venlo	36	23	6	7	84	39	+45	75	Qualification to promotion play-offs Second round (Note: Ten teams, two from the Eredivisie and eight from the Eerste Divisie, play for two spots in the 2016–17 Eredivisie, the remaining eight teams play in the 2016–17 Eerste Divisie. The season is subdivided in periods consisting of games 1–9, 10–18, 19–27 and 28–36. The top finisher in each period (that has not won a previous period) is a period winner and qualifies for the promotion play-offs first round even if they finish the season outside of the top nine.)
3	NAC Breda	36	20	7	9	84	42	+42	67	Qualification to promotion play-offs Second round
4	Eindhoven	36	19	6	11	55	44	+11	63	Qualification to promotion play-offs Second round
5	Go Ahead Eagles (P)	36	18	7	11	61	41	+20	61	Qualification to promotion play-offs Second round
6	Volendam	36	14	10	12	54	40	+14	52	Qualification to promotion play-offs First round
7	Emmen	36	15	6	15	58	57	+1	51	Qualification to promotion play-offs First round
8	Almere City	36	14	8	14	68	66	+2	50	Qualification to promotion play-offs First round
9	Jong Ajax (Note: Youth teams cannot be promoted and cannot participate in the promotion play-offs.)	36	13	11	12	59	57	+2	50	
10	MVV	36	14	8	14	52	60	−8	50	Qualification to promotion play-offs First round
11	Jong PSV	36	13	9	14	51	71	−20	48	
12	Telstar	36	12	8	16	57	64	−7	44	
13	Helmond Sport	36	11	9	16	52	59	−7	42	
14	Dordrecht	36	11	7	18	47	67	−20	40	
15	Achilles '29	36	10	9	17	43	61	−18	39	
16	Fortuna Sittard	36	11	6	19	41	74	−33	39	
17	Den Bosch	36	9	11	16	47	53	−6	38	
18	RKC Waalwijk	36	7	11	18	41	66	−25	32	
19	Oss	36	7	8	21	43	80	−37	29	

Updated to match(es) played on 22 April 2016. Source: Soccerway
Rules for classification: 1) points; 2) goal difference; 3) number of goals scored
(C) Champions; (P) Promoted

== Results ==
Home \ Away	ACH	ALM	DBO	DOR	EIN	EMM	FOR	GAE	HEL	JAJ	JPS	MVV	NAC	OSS	RKC	SPA	TEL	VOL	VVV
Achilles '29		1–3	0–1	2–1	2–1	1–2	3–0	1–0	1–2	2–1	3–2	1–2	1–2	1–0	0–0	0–3	1–3	0–0	1–3
Almere City	2–1		1–1	3–0	1–2	4–0	0–3	3–4	2–2	2–1	7–0	0–3	0–1	0–1	3–1	1–0	0–2	2–2	3–3
Den Bosch	1–2	1–2		2–0	3–1	3–0	2–2	2–4	2–1	3–0	0–0	2–2	3–6	4–2	1–1	1–2	5–0	0–0	0–1
Dordrecht	3–3	3–1	1–2		3–1	0–2	1–3	1–1	0–2	0–1	4–0	1–0	0–2	1–0	1–2	0–3	2–2	1–3	0–0
Eindhoven	0–1	3–2	0–0	1–1		1–1	3–1	0–0	1–4	2–1	2–0	4–1	2–1	4–0	1–0	1–1	2–1	1–0	2–0
Emmen	3–1	5–6	1–0	1–0	4–2		1–2	4–1	0–1	4–2	1–1	2–3	1–0	0–2	6–1	1–3	1–0	1–0	1–4
Fortuna Sittard	2–4	0–2	1–1	0–5	2–1	2–2		0–1	3–0	1–2	1–1	1–2	1–2	3–0	1–0	1–4	0–3	0–6	0–5
Go Ahead Eagles	3–2	4–1	0–0	3–0	1–2	0–0	0–2		1–1	2–0	1–2	0–0	4–1	5–0	1–0	2–0	5–0	3–2	0–3
Helmond Sport	2–2	0–2	0–0	1–2	1–2	3–2	0–2	0–4		2–3	4–2	1–0	1–1	4–0	1–0	1–1	4–1	0–2	1–4
Jong Ajax	3–1	2–2	3–1	4–1	0–0	2–0	3–0	2–2	1–1		1–2	0–1	2–1	2–2	0–0	1–1	4–1	2–0	2–2
Jong PSV	1–1	3–4	2–1	1–4	2–0	0–0	0–1	1–0	3–1	3–3		2–0	0–3	3–1	3–1	0–3	4–3	2–2	1–5
MVV	1–1	0–0	1–0	2–2	0–2	4–1	1–3	1–2	1–4	0–0	2–3		1–1	4–2	6–2	1–3	1–0	3–1	1–3
NAC Breda	3–1	1–1	3–0	7–0	3–1	2–2	5–0	0–1	1–0	3–0	5–2	1–1		5–0	1–1	4–0	2–1	1–4	0–1
Oss	1–1	1–2	3–1	2–3	0–4	0–3	4–0	3–0	2–2	1–2	0–0	1–3	1–6		0–0	1–2	3–3	1–2	2–1
RKC Waalwijk	1–1	3–1	1–1	0–1	1–2	0–1	1–1	0–2	2–2	3–5	1–2	1–3	2–0	3–2		1–1	2–1	2–1	2–1
Sparta Rotterdam	3–0	3–2	5–2	2–3	3–0	3–2	1–1	3–1	2–1	3–1	1–0	6–0	1–1	3–1	5–2		2–1	3–1	3–1
Telstar	3–0	2–2	1–0	3–0	1–2	2–1	3–0	1–2	1–0	4–2	1–1	4–0	1–4	1–1	1–1	1–3		1–1	2–2
Volendam	0–0	3–1	2–0	2–2	1–2	0–2	1–0	1–0	2–1	1–1	3–0	0–1	1–2	1–1	3–0	2–0	3–0		1–1
VVV-Venlo	3–0	4–0	2–1	3–0	1–0	1–0	4–1	2–1	4–1	3–0	1–2	3–0	4–3	1–2	4–3	1–1	1–2	3–0	

Updated to match(es) played on 15 April 2016. Source: Jupiler League
Legend: Blue = home team win; Yellow = draw; Red = away team win.

== Play-offs ==
=== Promotion/relegation play-offs ===
Ten teams, two from the Eredivisie and eight from the Eerste Divisie, play for two spots in the 2016–17 Eredivisie, the remaining eight teams play in the 2016–17 Eerste Divisie.

First round
MVV Maastricht	2	2	4
Volendam	1	1	2
Almere City	4	4	8
Emmen	1	1	2

Second round
MVV Maastricht	0	1	1
De Graafschap	1	2	3
Go Ahead Eagles	1	2	3
VVV-Venlo	0	2	2
Almere City	0	2	2
Willem II	1	5	6
Eindhoven	1	0	1
NAC Breda	0	2	2

Third round
De Graafschap	1	1	2
Go Ahead Eagles*	4	1	5
Willem II*	1	3	4
NAC Breda	2	1	3

Key: * = Play-off winners, (a) = Wins because of away goals rule, (e) = Wins after extra time in second leg, (p) = Wins after penalty shoot-out.

== Attendances ==
#	Club	Average
1	NAC	13,959
2	Go Ahead	8,477
3	Sparta	7,841
4	MVV	4,227
5	Volendam	4,136
6	VVV	3,903
7	Emmen	3,280
8	Den Bosch	2,989
9	Eindhoven	2,613
10	RKC	2,150
11	Helmond	2,144
12	Fortuna	2,013
13	Telstar	1,956
14	Dordrecht	1,902
15	Oss	1,706
16	Achilles	1,578
17	Almere	1,287
18	Jong PSV	653
19	Jong Ajax	519
