= SV DFS =

Dutch football club

- Full name: Sportvereniging Door Fusie Sterk
- Founded: 1 October 2001
- Ground: Sportpark 't Heerenland, Opheusden
- Manager: Marcel Omvlee
- League: Eerste Klasse
- Website: www.svdfs.nl/voetbal/
Home colours

SV DFS is a football club from Opheusden, Netherlands.
