= JVC Cuijk =

Dutch football club

- Full name: Voetbalvereniging Jan Van Cuijk
- Nickname: JVC
- Founded: 1 April 1931
- Ground: Sportpark De Groenendijkse; Cuijk, Netherlands
- Capacity: 3,000
- Chairman: Ingrid Kloosterman
- Manager: Dennis Straatman
- League: Derde Divisie
- 2016–17: 11th, Sunday Derde Divisie
Home colours	Away colours

JVC Cuijk is a Dutch association football club from Cuijk, Netherlands. The club was founded in 1931 and plays in Derde Divisie, the fourth tier of Dutch football, in the Sunday league.

The team plays home games at Sportpark De Groenendijkse, which seats 3,000 spectators.

== Current squad ==
As of 1 February 2016

Note: Flags indicate national team as defined under FIFA eligibility rules; some limited exceptions apply. Players may hold more than one non-FIFA nationality.

No.	Pos.	Nation	Player
1	GK	NED	Bart Tinus
2	DF	NED	Sam Nijpels
3	DF	NED	Erik van Loon
4	MF	NED	Timo Peters
5	DF	NED	Stevie Hattu
6	MF	NED	Simon van Zeelst
7	MF	NED	Ryan Bouwmeester
8	FW	NED	Rik Renirie
9	FW	NED	Chefrino Eind
10	MF	NED	Mitch van der Ven
11	FW	NED	Alexander Prent
12	FW	NED	Boy Visser

No.	Pos.	Nation	Player
14	MF	NED	Ilias Zaimi
15	MF	NED	Bjenze Graat
17	FW	NED	Frank Hol
18	MF	NED	Robin Custers
19	DF	CUW	Shanon David Carmelia
20	MF	NED	Jay van Boxtel
21	DF	NED	Jorrit Ritzen (captain)
22	DF	NED	Jurre Grotenhuis
23	FW	NED	Cayfano Latupeirissa
26	GK	NED	Yorrit Kanters
27	GK	NED	Arjan Ardts

== Honours ==
- Hoofdklasse Zondag: 2 (2001, 2007)
- KNVB District Cup: 2 (2011, 2014).
