= Groesbeek =

- Town and former municipality
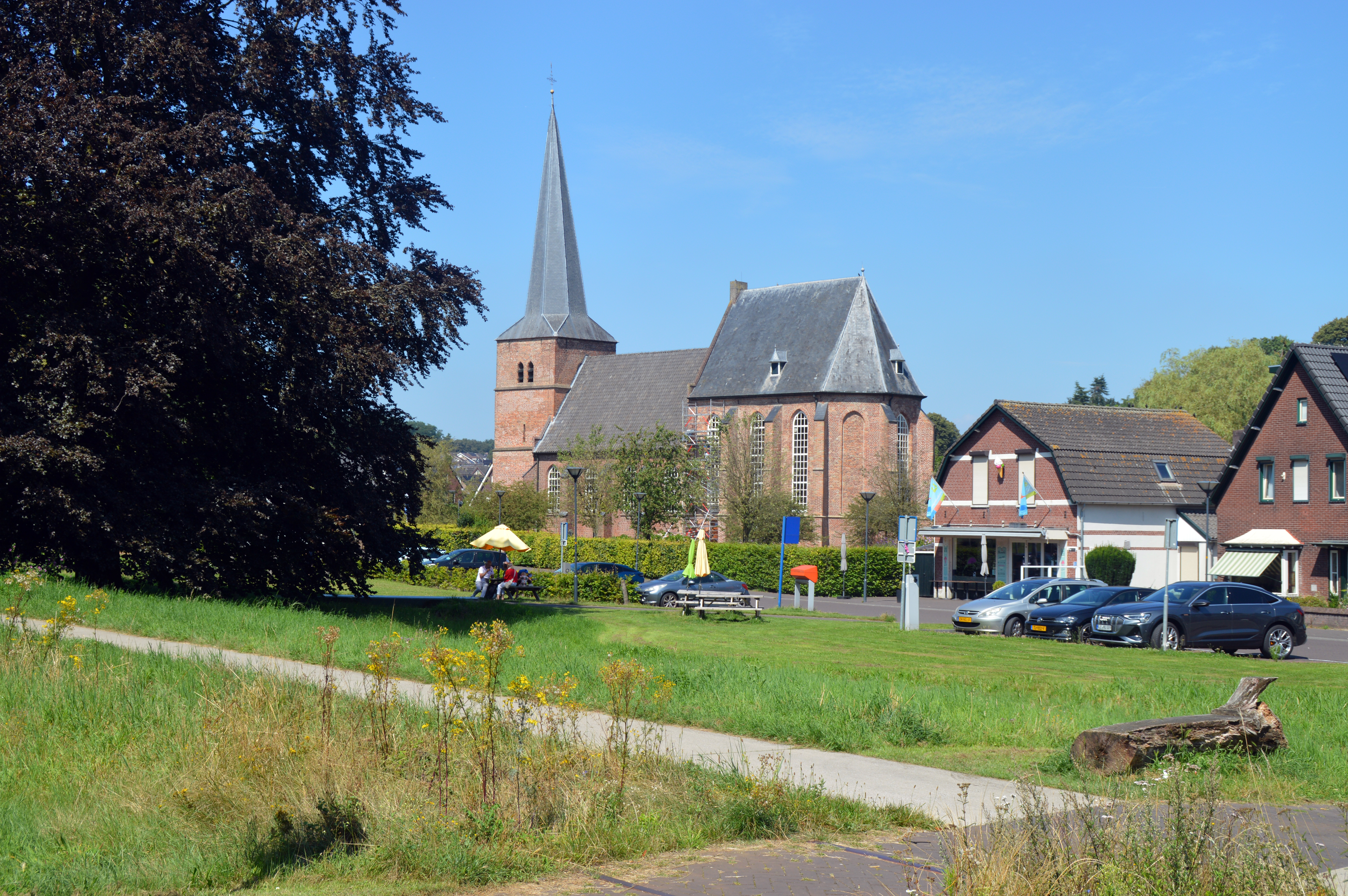
- Reformed church in Groesbeek

- Flag Coat of arms

- Location in Gelderland (municipality of Groesbeek before 2015)

- Location in the province of Gelderland in the Netherlands Location in the Netherlands
- Coordinates: 51°47′N 5°56′E
- Country: Netherlands
- Province: Gelderland
- Municipality: Berg en Dal

Area
  - Total: 23.68 km^{2} (9.14 sq mi)
- Elevation: 34 m (112 ft)

Population (2021)
  - Total: 12,910
  - Density: 545.2/km^{2} (1,412/sq mi)
- Demonym(s): Groesbekenaar, Groesbeker
- Time zone: UTC+1 (CET)
  - Summer (DST): UTC+2 (CEST)
- Postcode: 6560–6562
- Area code: 024
- Website: www.bergendal.nl

Groesbeek (Dutch pronunciation: [ˈɣrusbeːk]) is a town and former municipality in the province of Gelderland, the Netherlands. In January 2015 the former municipality merged with Millingen aan de Rijn and Ubbergen. The larger area was known as Groesbeek until January 2016, when its name was changed to Berg en Dal.

== Description ==
Groesbeek is named after a small stream called the Groesbeek (beek being Dutch for "stream" or "brook"), which no longer exists in its original form. Hills and forests surround the town, and because of this, Groesbeek was isolated in the past, with a close community and a strong dialect.

== Geography ==
Groesbeek and Kranenburg are situated on the banks of the Groesbeek, a small stream in the Groesbeek valley, a large valley between the Nijmeegse heuvelrug and Reichswald. The Groesbeek valley was carved out by glaciers during the Saale glacial, marking the southernmost expansion of ice-age glaciers in the Netherlands. The hills surrounding the valley in which Groesbeek lies are technically the terminal moraines of those glaciers, but in contrast to the hills in the central and eastern Netherlands, these hills are rising by 0.5-0.8 mm/year due to tectonic uplift.

Due to this, the topography is much more varied here than in other higher grounds with similar origins in the Netherlands. Finally, during the Younger Dryas stadial, large amounts of loess were deposited in the valley, making it extremely fertile, while the hills around it are composed to this day of sandy loam unsuitable for intensive agriculture, so that the area has been covered with thick forests to this day. This contributed to the isolation of the area, especially considering the extent of the forests in the Middle Ages was much larger than today. The isolation of the valley was only alleviated by the arrival of the railway in 1865 and finally lifted in the interbellum by the construction of a high capacity paved road to nearby Nijmegen.

== World War II ==
During Operation Market Garden the 82nd Airborne Division landed near Groesbeek. In the subsequent fighting the town was nearly completely destroyed and inhabitants were evacuated. The National Liberation museum is based in Groesbeek on one of the landing sites of operation Market Garden, and the Groesbeek Canadian War Cemetery also resides there.

== Modern Groesbeek ==
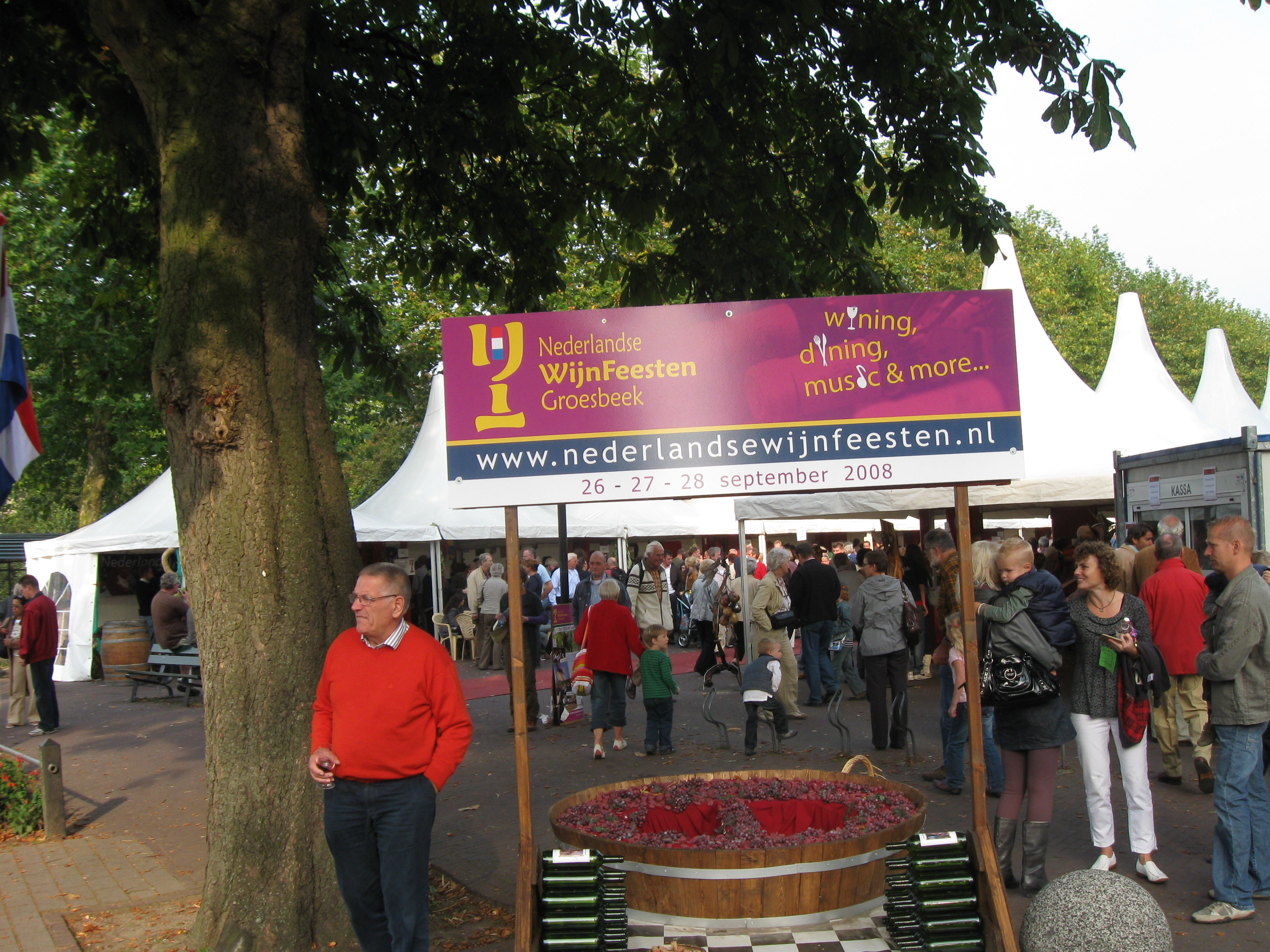
Annual wine harvest festival in Groesbeek

Because of much better infrastructure and a generally increased amount of mobility among the Dutch after WW2, modern Groesbeek has transformed from a small village dependent on agriculture and forestry into a sprawling commuter town of nearby Nijmegen. The town itself is surrounded by hills and forests, including a three-kilometre wide band of woodlands, Dekkerswald, separating it from Heilig Landstichting and Nijmegen proper. In the last decade a viniculture industry has sprung up in Groesbeek, making the area the northernmost vinicultural centre in Europe, and the only such area in the Netherlands, owing to the highly fertile loess soil, generally warmer summers, and new variations of grapes which do better in the humid climate.

Despite having under 20,000 inhabitants, Groesbeek has one football club, (De Treffers), playing in the Tweede Divisie, the country's highest amateur level. Another club, Achilles '29, accepted promotion to the national first division in 2013 (the first club that accepted promotion in many years). There are also four other football teams: Germania, D.V.S.G., Groesbeekse boys and Rood-Wit.

The town is also well known as the setting of the third day of the Nijmeegse Vierdaagse when walkers participating in this international event have to pass through the town and the surrounding hills.

Groesbeek is also famous for having one of the biggest parades in the Netherlands on the Sunday of the Catholic carnival. Because of its success, places are now limited as the parade.

== In the area ==
The town has two notable museums: the Freedom Museum and the Bible Open Air Museum. The Groesbeek Canadian War Cemetery and Memorial is located about two kilometers north of the town.

== Gallery ==
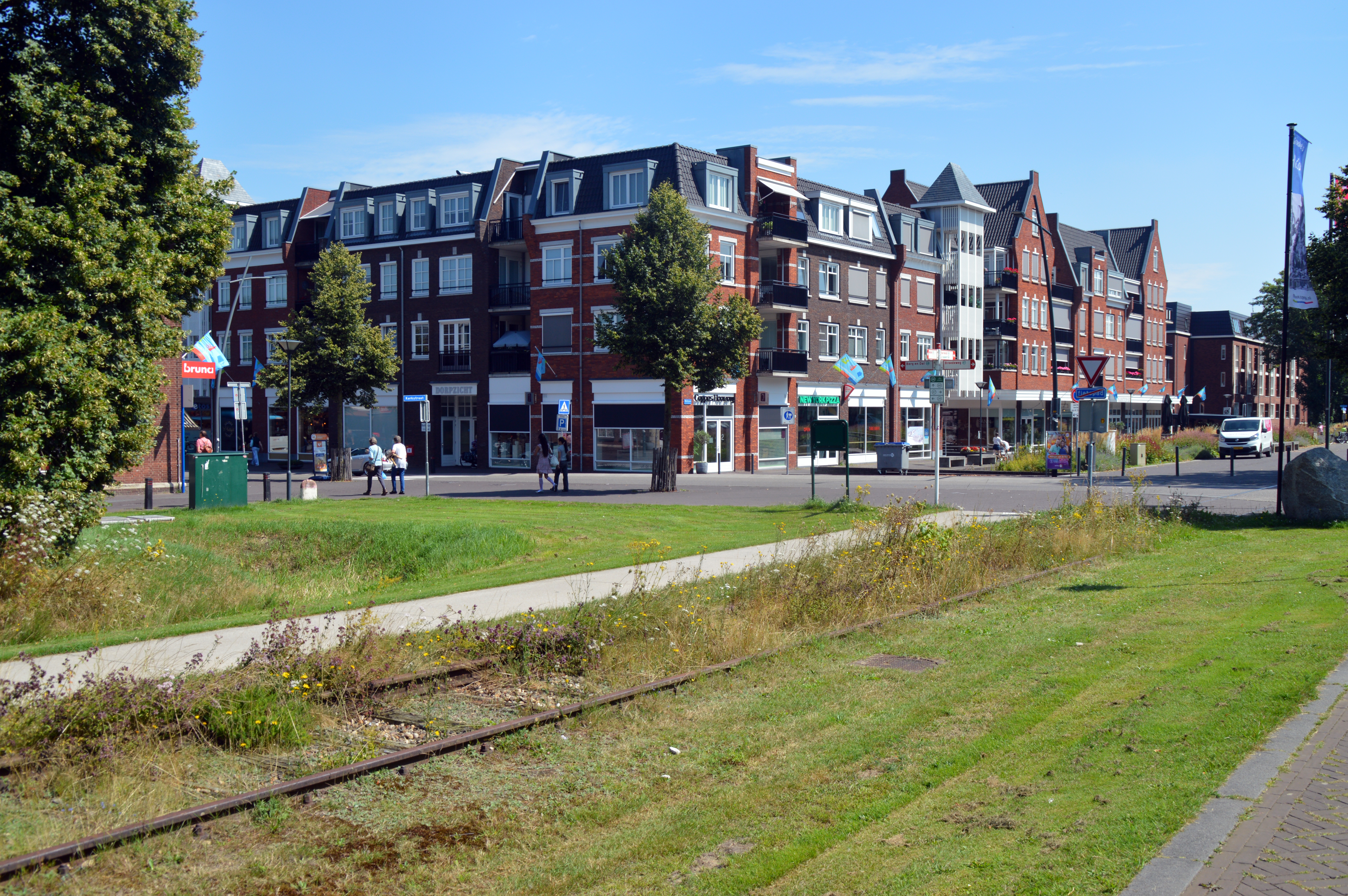
Dorpsstraat and Bellevue

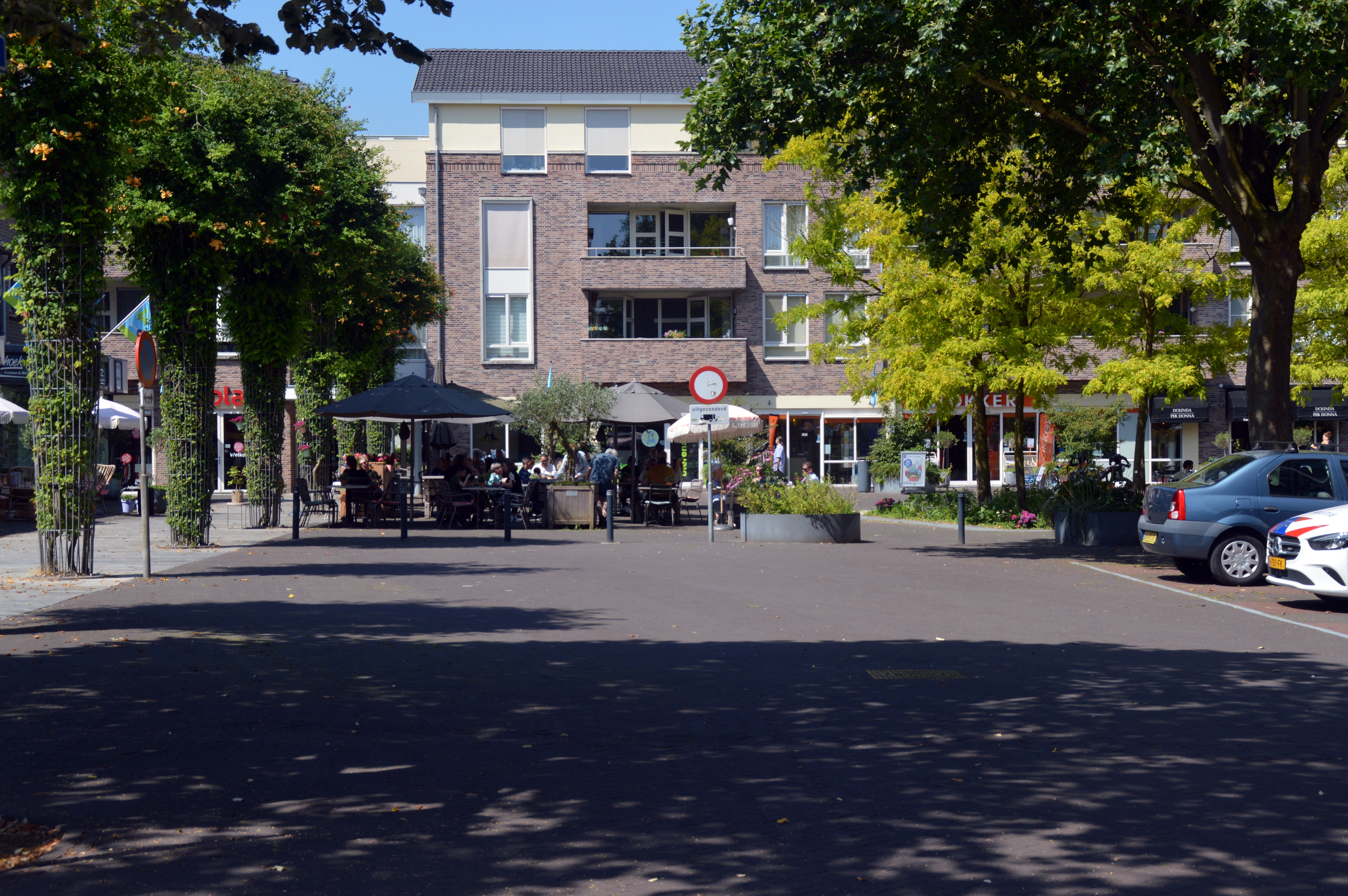
Centrum

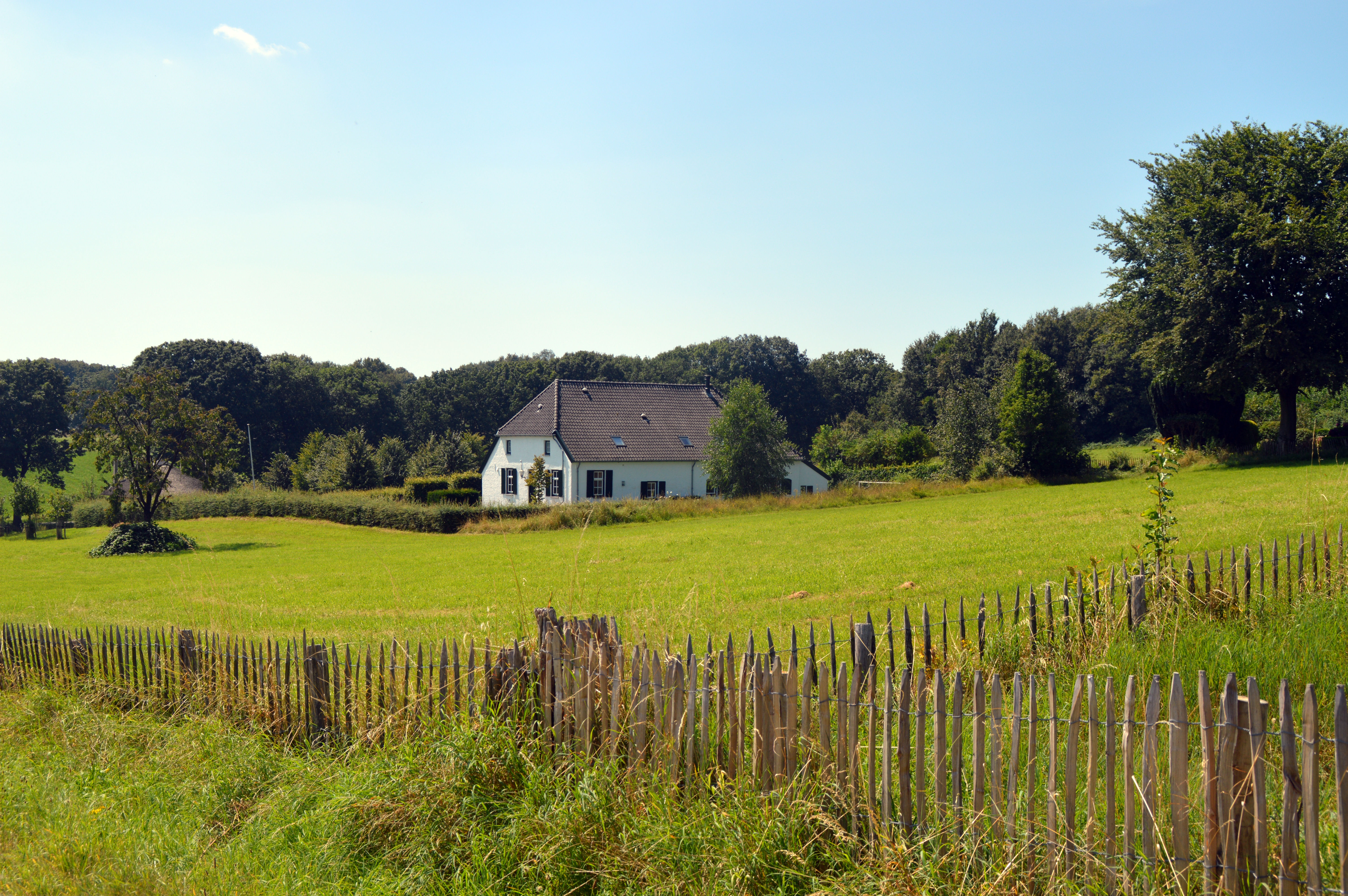
Farm Zevenheuvelenweg

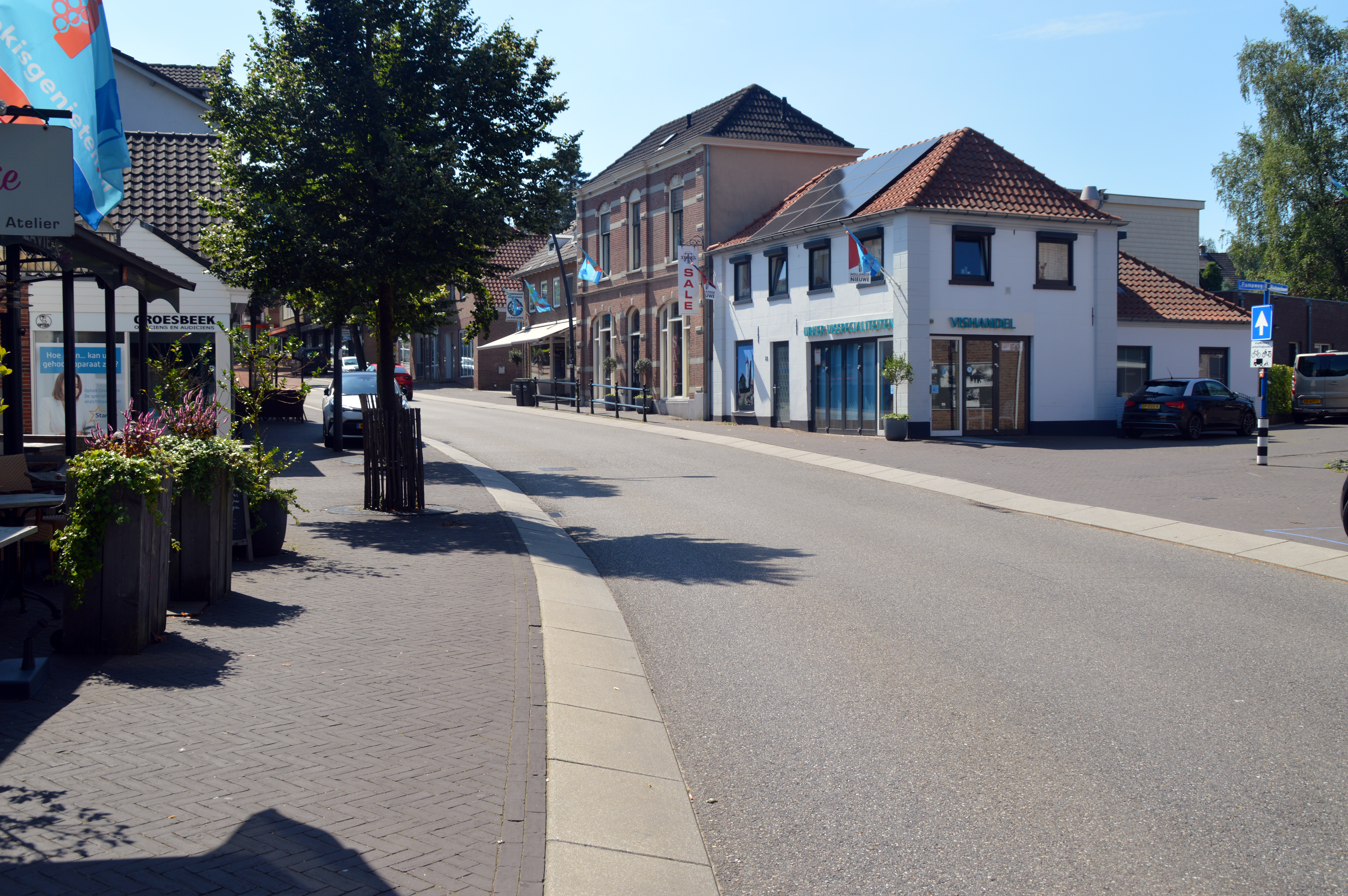
Dorpsstraat
