= Achilles '29 =

Dutch football club

- Full name: Rooms Katholieke Sport Vereniging Achilles '29
- Nickname: De Witzwarten (The Whiteblacks)
- Founded: 1 June 1929
- Ground: Sportpark De Heikant, Groesbeek
- Capacity: 4,506
- Chairman: Pjotr van der Horst
- Head coach: Rob Bouman
- League: Saturday Eerste Klasse F (East) (2026–27)
- Website: achilles1929.nl
Home colours	Away colours

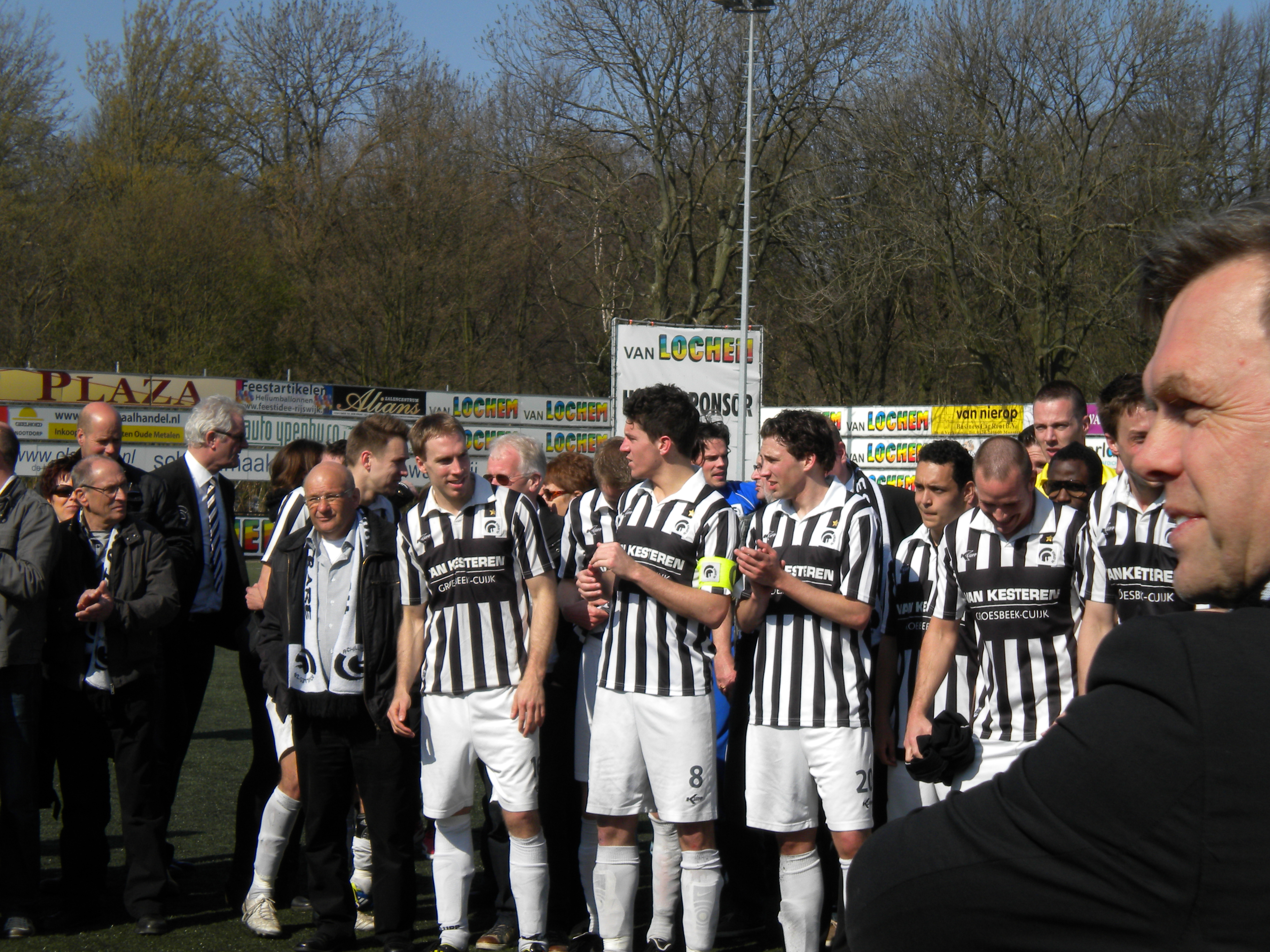
Achilles '29 after winning the overall amateur title in 2013

Achilles '29 is a football club from Groesbeek, Netherlands, competing in the sixth-tier Eerste Klasse.

The club is known for its successes in the Dutch domestic cup, having knocked FC Volendam, Heracles Almelo, RKC Waalwijk, Telstar and MVV Maastricht out of the KNVB Cup.

== History ==
Achilles '29 became Hoofdklasse champions for the first time in 1983 in the Hoofdklasse Sunday B. In 2006, Achilles became champions in the Hoofdklasse Sunday C, with a two-point lead over rival De Treffers. Two seasons later a comparable Hoofdklasse victory was achieved when Achilles '29 played De Treffers in the last match of the season. Had De Treffers managed to win the match, they would have become champions. As long as Achilles '29 managed to gain at least one point (either a draw or a win) the championship would go to De Heikant. In a historic derby, Achilles '29 won 3–2 and became champions of the Hoofdklasse for the third time.

In 2010–11, in the first season of the Topklasse, relegated Eerste Divisie team FC Oss won the Sunday title, after it had beaten Achilles '29 in the last match of the season with 0–2. Achilles '29 finished on second place, just missing out to a decision duel by losing on the last day.

In the following season, Achilles '29 became champion of the Topklasse Sunday with a nine-point lead over Haaglandia. As the Sunday overall champions they faced Saturday champions SV Spakenburg for the national title. In the first leg they won 3–0 and in the second leg 0–2, becoming the national champions in amateur football for the first time with a 5–0 aggregate win. Achilles '29 hereby received an option of promotion to the Eerste Divisie, but did not choose to use it.

=== Professional football ===
In the 2012–13 Topklasse season Achilles '29 was the title favorite, as the reigning champion. After 11 matches it became top of the table and remained there for the rest of the season. It lost the national title to VV Katwijk, but unlike Katwijk, Achilles chose to use its right of promotion following dispensation to some aspects in the licence for professional football. As a result, it played in the Eerste Divisie for the 2013–14 season, having drawn their first game in professional football against FC Emmen.

=== Downfall ===
After 4 seasons in the Eerste Divisie, the club was relegated to the amateur Tweede Divisie in May 2017. They suffered two further relegations in the following seasons, from the Tweede Divisie to the Derde Divisie in May 2018 and from the Derde Divisie to the Hoofdklasse in May 2019.

Achilles '29 were in last place in their Hoofdklasse group for the 2019–20 season, but avoided relegation due to the suspension of the Dutch football leagues as a result of the COVID-19 pandemic in the Netherlands. At that point, the club had only one point from 20 matches. They eventually suffered relegation to the sixth-tier Eerste Klasse in the 2021–22 Hoofdklasse season. The following season Achilles would suffer another relegation, this time to the Tweede Klasse, meaning the club went from the second to the seventh tier in just six years.

== Women's ==
The women's team entered the professional league in the 2016–17 season.

== Honours ==
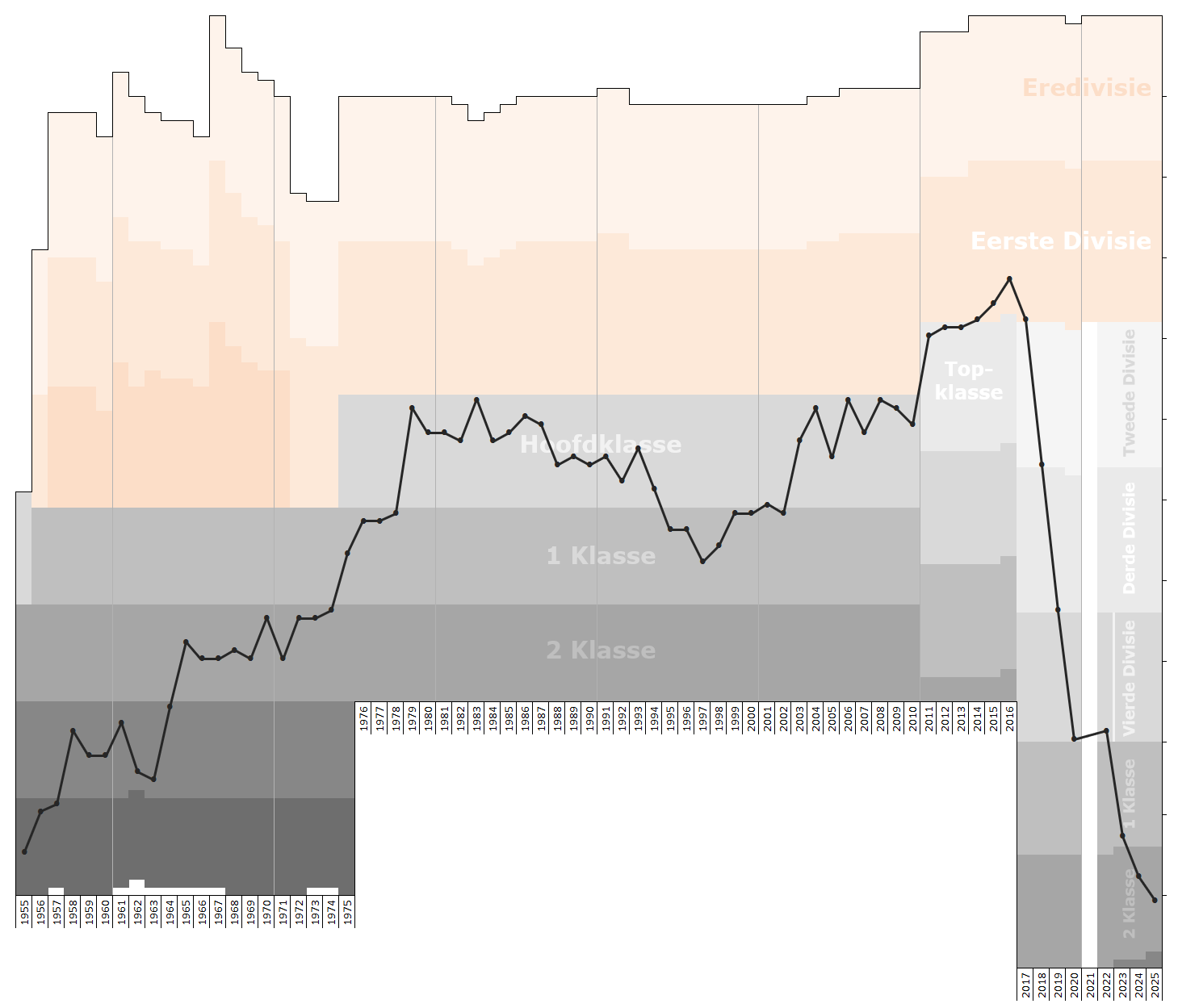
Chart of end-season table rankings of Achilles '29

- Topklasse
  - Champions: 2011–12
  - Sunday champions: 2011–12, 2012–13
- Hoofdklasse
  - Champions: 1982–83, 2005–06, 2007–08
  - District Cup – East winners: 2007–08, 2010–11
- Amateur KNVB Cup
  - Winners: 2010–11
- Amateur Supercup
  - Winners: 2011–12, 2012–13

== Former players ==
- (Netherlands) Amine Ennali
- (Malaysia) Ryan Lambert
- (Turkey) Kürşad Sürmeli

== Managers ==
- Eric Meijers (2002–2012)
- Jan van Deinsen (2012–2013)
- François Gesthuizen (2013–2015)
- Eric Meijers (2015–2018)
- Frans Derks (interim, 2018)
- Arno Arts (2018–2019)
- Stefan Muller (2019–2020)
- Ruud Kaiser (2020–2021)
- Patrick Pothuizen (2021–2024)
- Rob Bouman (2024–present)
