= 2015–16 Helmond Sport season =

Helmond Sport
2015–16 season
- Chairman: Philippe van Esch
- Manager: Jan van Dijk
- Stadium: GS Staalwerken Stadion
- Eerste Divisie: 13th
- KNVB Cup: 3rd round
- Top goalscorer: League: Gyrano Kerk (7 goals); All: Gyrano Kerk (7 goals)
- Highest home attendance: 3,654 (against Sparta Rotterdam in 32nd week)
- Lowest home attendance: 951 (against Achilles '29 in 15th week)
- Average home league attendance: 2,117
- Biggest win: 4-0 (against TOP Oss(h) in Eerste Divisie week 35)
- Biggest defeat: 4-0 (against Go Ahead Eagles(h) in Eerste Divisie week 34)
- All statistics correct as of 20 November 2024.

The 2015–16 season was Helmond Sport's 49th season in existence and 46th (32nd consecutive) in the Eerste Divisie. Helmond Sport finished Eerste Divisie as 13th.

The club competed also in the KNVB Cup. Helmond Sport lost 1–0 against SC Heerenveen in the 3rd round of KNVB Cup and they are eliminated from the cup.

Gyrano Kerk was the top scorer of the club in this season with 7 goals in Eerste Divisie.

Wouter van der Steen was the most appeared player in the season with a total of 37 appearances; 35 appearances in the Eerste Divisie and 2 appearances in the KNVB Cup.

== Players ==
=== First-team squad ===
As of 22 January 2016

Note: Flags indicate national team as defined under FIFA eligibility rules; some limited exceptions apply. Players may hold more than one non-FIFA nationality.

No.	Pos.	Nation	Player
1	GK	NED	Wouter van der Steen
2	DF	NED	Gévero Markiet
3	DF	NED	Kai Heerings
4	DF	NED	Jeffrey van Nuland
5	MF	CUW	Gillian Justiana
6	MF	NED	Kevin Visser
7	MF	NED	Steven Edwards
8	MF	NED	Roel van de Sande
9	FW	CUW	Charlton Vicento
10	MF	NED	Mounir El Allouchi
11	MF	NED	Carlo de Reuver
12	FW	NED	Marc Koot
14	DF	NED	Stephen Warmolts

No.	Pos.	Nation	Player
15	FW	SUR	Gyrano Kerk
16	FW	NED	Thomas Schilders
17	MF	NED	Colin van Gool
18	MF	NED	Sam Strijbosch
19	FW	CUW	Maiky Fecunda
20	DF	NED	Sven van de Kerkhof
24	DF	NED	Yannick Cortie
26	DF	NED	Jeroen Verkennis
26	FW	NED	Joost van Heck
28	FW	NED	Marijn van Heugten
29	DF	NED	Tim Rerimassie
30	GK	NED	Stijn van Gassel

== Transfers ==
=== In ===
Pos.	Player	Transferred from	Fee	Date
DF	(Serbia) Aleksandar Bjelica	(Netherlands) Willem II Tilburg	Free	1 July 2015
FW	(Curaçao) Charlton Vicento	(Netherlands) PEC Zwolle	Free	1 July 2015
DF	(Netherlands) Stephen Warmolts	(Netherlands) SC Heerenveen	On loan	1 July 2015
MF	(Netherlands) Steven Edwards	(Netherlands) Achilles '29	Free	1 July 2015
FW	(Netherlands) Thomas Schilders	(Netherlands) Willem II U21	Free	1 July 2015
FW	(Suriname) Gyrano Kerk	(Netherlands) FC Utrecht U21	On loan	3 August 2015
MF	(Netherlands) Carlo de Reuver	(Netherlands) Excelsior Rotterdam	On loan	31 August 2015
DF	(Netherlands) Gévero Markiet	(Netherlands) FC Utrecht	On loan	31 August 2015
DF	(Netherlands) Yannick Cortie	(Netherlands) FC Utrecht	On loan	31 August 2015
DF	(Netherlands) Kai Heerings	(Netherlands) SC Cambuur	On loan	22 January 2016

=== Out ===
Pos.	Player	Transferred to	Fee	Date
FW	(Netherlands) Jack Tuijp	(Hungary) Ferencvárosi TC	End of loan	30 June 2015
FW	(Netherlands) Lars Hutten	(Netherlands) Excelsior Rotterdam	End of loan	30 June 2015
MF	(Netherlands) Arne van Geffen	(Netherlands) NWC	Free	1 July 2015
MF	(Belgium) Daniel Guijo-Velasco	(Belgium) K.F.C. Diest		1 July 2015
MF	(Netherlands) Dave Nieskens	No club		1 July 2015
DF	(Netherlands) Ferry de Regt	(Netherlands) Fortuna Sittard	Free	1 July 2015
MF	(Netherlands) Kevin Gomez-Nieto	(Netherlands) SVV Scheveningen	Free	1 July 2015
MF	(Netherlands) Marciano Duda	(Netherlands) SC Helmondia	Free	1 July 2015
FW	(Belgium) Oumar Diouck	(Belgium) Lommel S.K.		1 July 2015
FW	(Belgium) Koen Weuts	No club		1 July 2015
DF	(United States) Charles Kazlauskas	(Netherlands) De Treffers	Free	27 August 2015
FW	(Netherlands) Stanley Elbers	(Netherlands) Excelsior Rotterdam	€200,000	31 August 2015
DF	(Serbia) Aleksandar Bjelica	(Belgium) K.V. Mechelen	€100,000	11 January 2016

== Competitions ==
=== Overall record ===
Competition	First match	Last match	Starting round	Final position	Record							
Competition	First match	Last match	Starting round	Final position	Pld	W	D	L	GF	GA	GD	Win %
Eerste Divisie	7 August 2015	29 April 2016	Week 1	13th	36	11	9	16	52	59	−7	30.56
KNVB Cup	24 September 2015	29 October 2015	2nd round	3rd round	2	1	0	1	2	2	+0	50.00
Total					38	12	9	17	54	61	−7	31.58

Source: ESPN

=== Eerste Divisie ===
==== Results summary ====
Overall								Home						Away					
Pld	W	D	L	GF	GA	GD	Pts	W	D	L	GF	GA	GD	W	D	L	GF	GA	GD
36	11	9	16	52	59	−7	42	6	4	8	26	30	−4	5	5	8	26	29	−3

Source: ESPN

==== Results by round ====
Round	1	2	3	4	5	6	7	8	9	10	11	12	13	14	15	16	17	18	19	20	21	22	23	24	25	26	27	28	29	30	31	32	33	34	35	36
Ground	H	A	H	A	H	A	H	A	H	A	H	H	A	A	H	A	H	A	A	H	A	A	H	H	A	H	A	H	A	H	A	H	A	H	H	A
Result	W	D	L	W	D	L	L	L	W	W	L	W	D	L	D	D	W	D	W	L	L	L	W	D	L	L	D	L	L	L	W	D	W	L	W	L
Position																																				13

Source: ESPN
A = Away; H = Home; W = Win; D = Draw; L = Loss

=== Matches ===
==== 1st half ====
7 August 2015 Week 1	Helmond Sport	1-0	MVV Maastricht	Helmond
20:00	Stanley Elbers 17'	Report		Stadium: GS Staalwerken Stadion; Attendance: 2,533

17 August 2015 Week 2	Jong Ajax	1-1	Helmond Sport	Duivendrecht
20:00	Robert Murić 16'	Report	Steven Edwards 67'	Stadium: Sportpark De Toekomst; Attendance: 591

21 August 2015 Week 3	Helmond Sport	0-2	Fortuna Sittard	Helmond
20:00		Report	Lars Hutten 44'; Gökhan Lekesiz 62'	Stadium: GS Staalwerken Stadion; Attendance: 2,171

24 August 2015 Week 4	FC Emmen	0-1	Helmond Sport	Emmen
20:00		Report	Jeffrey van Nuland 44'	Stadium: De Oude Meerdijk; Attendance: 3,150

28 August 2015 Week 5	Helmond Sport	1-1	NAC Breda	Helmond
20:00	Aleksandar Bjelica 47'	Report	Kevin Brands 90'	Stadium: GS Staalwerken Stadion; Attendance: 3,151

11 September 2015 Week 6	FC Den Bosch	2-1	Helmond Sport	Den Bosch
20:00	Paul Beekmans 35'; Arda Havar 90'	Report	Roel van de Sande 77'	Stadium: Stadion De Vliert; Attendance: 3,120

18 September 2015 Week 7	Helmond Sport	0-2	FC Volendam	Helmond
20:00		Report	Dylan Mertens 28'; Gyliano van Velzen 76'	Stadium: GS Staalwerken Stadion; Attendance: 2,356

27 September 2015 Week 8	VVV-Venlo	4-1	Helmond Sport	Venlo
14:30	Leandro Resida 57'; Vito van Crooij 60'; Ralf Seuntjens 63' (pen.) 83'	Report	Carlo de Reuver 13'	Stadium: Covebo Stadion - De Koel; Attendance: 3,800

2 October 2015 Week 9	Helmond Sport	1-0	RKC Waalwijk	Helmond
20:00	Charlton Vicento 12'	Report		Stadium: GS Staalwerken Stadion; Attendance: 2,431

16 October 2015 Week 10	FC Eindhoven	1-4	Helmond Sport	Eindhoven
20:00	Christopher Mandiangu 63'	Report	Gyrano Kerk 13'; Kevin Visser 23'; Gillian Justiana 71'; Gévero Markiet 82'	Stadium: Jan Louwers Stadion; Attendance: 3,316

23 October 2015 Week 11	Helmond Sport	1-2	FC Dordrecht	Helmond
20:00	Gillian Justiana 42'	Report	Rangelo Janga 53' 84'	Stadium: GS Staalwerken Stadion; Attendance: 2,069

6 November 2015 Week 12	Helmond Sport	4-2	Jong PSV	Helmond
20:00	Aleksandar Bjelica 12' 80' (pen.); Gyrano Kerk 40' 57'	Report	Steven Bergwijn 49' 55'	Stadium: GS Staalwerken Stadion; Attendance: 2,071

20 November 2015 Week 13	Almere City FC	2-2	Helmond Sport	Almere
20:00	Khalid Tadmine 62'; Pelle van Amersfoort 78'	Report	Thomas Schilders 85'; Gillian Justiana 86'	Stadium: Yanmar Stadion; Attendance: 1,293

27 November 2015 Week 14	Sparta Rotterdam	2-1	Helmond Sport	Rotterdam
20:00	Thomas Verhaar 33' 54' (pen.)	Report	Roel van de Sande 13'	Stadium: Het Kasteel; Attendance: 6,330

30 November 2015 Week 15	Helmond Sport	2-2	Achilles '29	Helmond
20:00	Aleksandar Bjelica 40'; Carlo de Reuver 90+1'	Report	Brian Bogers 6'; Boy van de Beek 60'	Stadium: GS Staalwerken Stadion; Attendance: 951

4 December 2015 Week 16	Go Ahead Eagles	1-1	Helmond Sport	Deventer
20:00	Leon de Kogel 90+4'	Report	Aleksandar Bjelica 45+2'	Stadium: De Adelaarshorst; Attendance: 8,024

11 December 2015 Week 17	Helmond Sport	4-1	SC Telstar	Helmond
20:00	Yannick Cortie 13'; Mounir El Allouchi 45+1'; Kevin Visser 87'; Thomas Schilders 90'	Report	Tarik Tissoudali 81'	Stadium: GS Staalwerken Stadion; Attendance: 1,971

18 December 2015 Week 18	TOP Oss	2-2	Helmond Sport	Oss
20:00	Felitciano Zschusschen 26'; Fatih Kamaçi 31'	Report	Yannick Cortie 20'; Mounir El Allouchi 59'	Stadium: Frans Heesen Stadion; Attendance: 1,636

==== 2nd half ====
15 January 2016 Week 19	MVV Maastricht	1-4	Helmond Sport	Maastricht
16:30	Emrullah Güvenç 71'	Report	Steven Edwards 13'; Gyrano Kerk 45+1'; Roel van de Sande 50'; Yannick Cortie 55'	Stadium: De Geusselt; Attendance: 4,139

18 January 2016 Week 20	Helmond Sport	2-3	Jong Ajax	Helmond
20:00	Sam Strijbosch 25'; Gyrano Kerk 41'	Report	Zakaria El Azzouzi 40' 90+2'; Steven Edwards 90+1' (o.g.)	Stadium: GS Staalwerken Stadion; Attendance: 1,899

15 January 2016 Week 21	NAC Breda	1-0	Helmond Sport	Breda
16:30	Kenny van der Weg 90+5'	Report		Stadium: Rat Verlegh Stadion; Attendance: 14,015

1 February 2016 Week 22	Fortuna Sittard	3-0	Helmond Sport	Sittard
20:00	Lars Hutten 18'; Roel Janssen 73' (pen.); Joeri Schroyen 82'	Report		Stadium: Fortuna Sittard Stadion; Attendance: 1,032

5 February 2016 Week 23	Helmond Sport	3-2	FC Emmen	Helmond
20:00	Stephen Warmolts 42'; Sam Strijbosch 55'; Roel van de Sande 73'	Report	Stephen Warmolts 4' (o.g.); Erixon Danso 48'	Stadium: GS Staalwerken Stadion; Attendance: 1,124

12 February 2016 Week 24	Helmond Sport	0-0	FC Den Bosch	Helmond
20:00		Report		Stadium: GS Staalwerken Stadion; Attendance: 1,773

15 February 2016 Week 25	FC Volendam	2-1	Helmond Sport	Volendam
20:00	Elson Hooi 18'; Erik Schouten 79'	Report	Kai Heerings 85'	Stadium: Kras Stadion; Attendance: 3,453

19 February 2016 Week 26	Helmond Sport	1-4	VVV-Venlo	Helmond
20:00	Gillian Justiana 24'	Report	Ralf Seuntjens 33'; Robin Buwalda 45+1' 71'; Johnatan Opoku 74'	Stadium: GS Staalwerken Stadion; Attendance: 1,900

26 February 2016 Week 27	RKC Waalwijk	2-2	Helmond Sport	Waalwijk
20:00	Jordy Thomassen 19' 61'	Report	Gillian Justiana 27'; Gévero Markiet 86'	Stadium: Mandemakers Stadion; Attendance: 1,840

4 March 2016 Week 28	Helmond Sport	1-2	FC Eindhoven	Helmond
20:00	Mounir El Allouchi 59'	Report	Anthony van den Hurk 66' 89'	Stadium: GS Staalwerken Stadion; Attendance: 2,890

14 March 2016 Week 29	Jong PSV	3-1	Helmond Sport	Eindhoven
20:00	Nikolai Laursen 13'; Kenneth Paal 35'; Luis Da Silva 84'	Report	Sam Strijbosch 62'	Stadium: PSV Campus De Herdgang; Attendance: 550

18 March 2016 Week 30	Helmond Sport	0-2	Almere City FC	Helmond
20:00		Report	Soufyan Ahannach 78'; Jason Oost 81'	Stadium: GS Staalwerken Stadion; Attendance: 1,371

1 April 2016 Week 31	FC Dordrecht	0-2	Helmond Sport	Dordrecht
20:00		Report	Gévero Markiet 51'; Mounir El Allouchi 54' (pen.)	Stadium: Stadion Krommedijk; Attendance: 1,224

8 April 2016 Week 32	Helmond Sport	1-1	Sparta Rotterdam	Helmond
20:00	Gyrano Kerk 4'	Report	Loris Brogno 23'	Stadium: GS Staalwerken Stadion; Attendance: 3,654

11 April 2016 Week 33	Achilles '29	1-2	Helmond Sport	Groesbeek
20:00	Boy van de Beek 15'	Report	Gyrano Kerk 25'; Steven Edwards 81'	Stadium: Sportpark de Heikant; Attendance: 1,355

15 April 2016 Week 34	Helmond Sport	0-4	Go Ahead Eagles	Helmond
20:00		Report	Kenny Teijsse 27' 82'; Darren Maatsen 90+1' 90+3'	Stadium: GS Staalwerken Stadion; Attendance: 2,300

22 April 2016 Week 35	Helmond Sport	4-0	Top Oss	Helmond
20:00	Steven Edwards 17'; Gillian Justiana 47'; Mounir El Allouchi 50'; Roel van de Sande 78'	Report		Stadium: GS Staalwerken Stadion; Attendance: 1,489

29 April 2016 Week 36	SC Telstar	1-0	Helmond Sport	Velsen-Zuid
20:00	Stefano Lilipaly 67'	Report		Stadium: 711 Stadion; Attendance: 2,602

=== KNVB Cup ===
24 September 2015 Second round	RKC Waalwijk	1-2	Helmond Sport	Waalwijk
18:30	Rigino Cicilia 37'	Report	Carlo de Reuver 45'; Roel van de Sande 84'	Stadium: Mandemakers Stadion; Referee: Johannes Martens

29 October 2015 Third round	SC Heerenveen	1-0	Helmond Sport	Heerenveen
20:00	Henk Veerman 45'	Report		Stadium: Abe Lenstra Stadion; Referee: Siemen Mulder

== Statistics ==
=== Scorers ===
#	Player	Eerste Divisie	KNVB	Total
1	(Suriname) Gyrano Kerk	7	0	7
2	(Netherlands) Roel van de Sande	5	1	6
3	(Serbia) Aleksandar Bjelica	5	0	5
3	(Curaçao) Gillian Justiana	5	0	5
3	(Netherlands) Mounir El Allouchi	5	0	5
6	(Netherlands) Carlo de Reuver	3	1	4
6	(Netherlands) Steven Edwards	4	0	4
8	(Netherlands) Gévero Markiet	3	0	3
8	(Netherlands) Sam Strijbosch	3	0	3
8	(Netherlands) Yannick Cortie	3	0	3
11	(Netherlands) Kevin Visser	2	0	2
11	(Netherlands) Thomas Schilders	2	0	2
13	(Curaçao) Charlton Vicento	1	0	1
13	(Netherlands) Jeffrey van Nuland	1	0	1
13	(Netherlands) Kai Heerings	1	0	1
13	(Netherlands) Stanley Elbers	1	0	1
13	(Netherlands) Stephen Warmolts	1	0	1

=== Appearances ===
#	Player	Eerste Divisie	KNVB	Total
1	(Netherlands) Wouter van der Steen	35	2	37
2	(Curaçao) Gillian Justiana	34	2	36
2	(Suriname) Gyrano Kerk	34	2	36
4	(Netherlands) Kevin Visser	33	2	35
5	(Netherlands) Mounir El Allouchi	32	1	33
6	(Netherlands) Gévero Markiet	30	2	32
6	(Netherlands) Roel van de Sande	30	2	32
6	(Netherlands) Stephen Warmolts	30	2	32
9	(Netherlands) Steven Edwards	30	1	31
10	(Netherlands) Thomas Schilders	27	2	29
11	(Netherlands) Yannick Cortie	24	1	25
12	(Netherlands) Carlo de Reuver	22	2	24
13	(Netherlands) Jeffrey van Nuland	19	2	21
14	(Serbia) Aleksandar Bjelica	17	2	19
15	(Curaçao) Maiky Fecunda	17	1	18
16	(Netherlands) Sam Strijbosch	14	0	14
17	(Curaçao) Charlton Vicento	9	1	10
17	(Netherlands) Kai Heerings	10	0	10
19	(Netherlands) Marc Koot	8	1	9
20	(Netherlands) Jeroen Verkennis	5	0	5
21	(Netherlands) Sven van de Kerkhof	4	0	4
22	(Netherlands) Stanley Elbers	3	0	3
22	(Netherlands) Tim Rerimassie	3	0	3
24	(Netherlands) Colin van Gool	2	0	2
24	(Netherlands) Marijn van Heugten	2	0	2
24	(Netherlands) Stijn van Gassel	2	0	2
27	(Netherlands) Joost van Heck	1	0	1

=== Clean sheets ===
#	Player	Eerste Divisie	Total
1	(Netherlands) Wouter van der Steen	6	6
2	(Netherlands) Stijn van Gassel	1	1
Total		7	7

=== Disciplinary record ===
#	Player	Eerste Divisie		KNVB		Total	
#	Player	Booked	Sent off (straight red)	Booked	Sent off (straight red)	Booked	Sent off (straight red)
1	(Netherlands) Stephen Warmolts	4	1	0	0	4	1
1	(Netherlands) Yannick Cortie	4	1	0	0	4	1
3	(Netherlands) Kai Heerings	2	1	0	0	2	1
4	(Curaçao) Charlton Vicento	0	1	0	0	0	1
5	(Serbia) Aleksandar Bjelica	6	0	1	0	7	0
5	(Curaçao) Gillian Justiana	7	0	0	0	7	0
5	(Netherlands) Kevin Visser	6	0	1	0	7	0
5	(Netherlands) Steven Edwards	7	0	0	0	7	0
9	(Suriname) Gyrano Kerk	5	0	0	0	5	0
9	(Netherlands) Jeffrey van Nuland	5	0	0	0	5	0
11	(Netherlands) Roel van de Sande	4	0	0	0	4	0
12	(Netherlands) Carlo de Reuver	2	0	0	0	2	0
12	(Netherlands) Gévero Markiet	2	0	0	0	2	0
12	(Netherlands) Mounir El Allouchi	2	0	0	0	2	0
12	(Netherlands) Sam Strijbosch	2	0	0	0	2	0
16	(Curaçao) Maiky Fecunda	1	0	0	0	1	0
16	(Netherlands) Sven van de Kerkhof	1	0	0	0	1	0
16	(Netherlands) Wouter van der Steen	1	0	0	0	1	0
