= List of Dutch football transfers summer 2015 =

This is a list of transfers in Dutch football for the 2015 Summer transfer window. Only moves featuring an Eredivisie side are listed.

The summer transfer window will open on June 9, 2015, and will close on August 31, 2015. Deals may be signed at any given moment in the season, but the actual transfer may only take place during the transfer window. Unattached players may sign at any moment.

Date	Name	Moving from	Moving to	Fee
10 January 2015^{1}	(Netherlands) Ludcinio Marengo	(Netherlands) FC Volendam	(Netherlands) ADO Den Haag	Free transfer
21 January 2015^{1}	(Netherlands) Wesley Hoedt	(Netherlands) AZ	(Italy) Lazio	€500,000
5 February 2015^{1}	(Netherlands) Jergé Hoefdraad	(Netherlands) Almere City	(Netherlands) SC Cambuur	Free transfer
10 February 2015^{6}	(Albania) Milot Rashica	(Kosovo) Kosova Vushtrri	(Netherlands) Vitesse Arnhem	Free transfer
19 February 2015^{1}	(Netherlands) Maikel van der Werff	(Netherlands) PEC Zwolle	(Netherlands) Vitesse Arnhem	Free transfer
20 February 2015^{1}	(Netherlands) Bryan Smeets	(Netherlands) MVV Maastricht	(Netherlands) De Graafschap	Free transfer
8 March 2015^{1}	(Cape Verde) Jerson Ribeiro	(Netherlands) Capelle	(Netherlands) Feyenoord	Free transfer
25 March 2015^{1}	(Finland) Niklas Moisander	(Netherlands) Ajax	(Italy) Sampdoria	Free transfer
27 March 2015^{1}	(Mexico) Andrés Guardado	(Spain) Valencia	(Netherlands) PSV	Undisclosed
1 April 2015^{1}	(Poland) Arkadiusz Milik	(Germany) Bayer Leverkusen	(Netherlands) Ajax	€2,500,000
1 April 2015^{1}	(Netherlands) Michael Chacón	(Netherlands) SC Heerenveen	(Netherlands) FC Dordrecht	Free transfer
9 April 2015^{1}	(Israel) Sheran Yeini	(Israel) Maccabi Tel Aviv	(Netherlands) Vitesse Arnhem	Undisclosed
10 April 2015^{1}	(Netherlands) Dirk Kuyt	(Turkey) Fenerbahçe	(Netherlands) Feyenoord	Free transfer
18 April 2015^{1}	(Netherlands) Mart Dijkstra	(Netherlands) SC Cambuur	(Netherlands) Sparta Rotterdam	Free transfer
28 April 2015^{1}	(Turkey) Colin Kazim-Richards	(Turkey) Bursaspor	(Netherlands) Feyenoord	Free transfer
29 April 2015^{1}	(Ivory Coast) Sébastien Haller	(France) Auxerre	(Netherlands) FC Utrecht	€800,000
29 April 2015^{1}	(Netherlands) Brandley Kuwas	(Netherlands) FC Volendam	(Netherlands) Excelsior	Free transfer
6 May 2015^{1}	(Serbia) Nemanja Gudelj	(Netherlands) AZ	(Netherlands) Ajax	€6,000,000
7 May 2015^{1}	(Netherlands) Memphis Depay	(Netherlands) PSV	(England) Manchester United	€27,500,000^{2}
15 May 2015^{1}	(Denmark) Kasper Kusk	(Netherlands) FC Twente	(Denmark) F.C. Copenhagen	Undisclosed
15 May 2015^{1}	(Denmark) Simon Poulsen	(Netherlands) AZ	(Netherlands) PSV	Free transfer
15 May 2015^{1}	(Netherlands) Jop van der Linden	(Netherlands) Go Ahead Eagles	(Netherlands) AZ	Free transfer
17 May 2015^{1}	(Belgium) Mike Vanhamel	(Netherlands) NEC	(Belgium) RWS Bruxelles	Free transfer
19 May 2015^{1}	(Netherlands) Kai Heerings	(Netherlands) FC Utrecht	(Netherlands) SC Cambuur	Free transfer
1 June 2015^{1}	(Netherlands) Luuk Koopmans	(Netherlands) FC Oss	(Netherlands) PSV	€50,000^{3}
1 June 2015^{1}	(Netherlands) Sjoerd Overgoor	(Netherlands) Go Ahead Eagles	(Netherlands) SC Cambuur	Undisclosed
2 June 2015^{1}	(Belgium) Funso Ojo	(Netherlands) FC Dordrecht	(Netherlands) Willem II	Free transfer
3 June 2015^{1}	(Netherlands) Wout Droste	(Netherlands) SC Cambuur	(Netherlands) Heracles Almelo	Free transfer
3 June 2015^{1}	(Poland) Filip Kurto	(Netherlands) FC Dordrecht	(Netherlands) Excelsior	Free transfer
4 June 2015^{1}	(Poland) Wojciech Golla	(Poland) Pogoń Szczecin	(Netherlands) NEC	Free transfer
4 June 2015^{1}	(Netherlands) Jasper Waalkens	(Netherlands) NEC	(Netherlands) Almere City	Free transfer
4 June 2015^{1}	(Netherlands) Peter Leeuwenburgh	(Netherlands) Ajax	(Netherlands) FC Dordrecht	Loan
8 June 2015^{1}	(Czech Republic) Dominik Mašek	(Germany) Hamburger SV	(Netherlands) SC Cambuur	Free transfer
8 June 2015^{1}	(Netherlands) Tim Breukers	(Netherlands) FC Twente	(Netherlands) Heracles Almelo	Free transfer
8 June 2015^{1}	(Germany) Tobias Haitz	(Netherlands) NEC	(Germany) Viktoria Köln	Free transfer
9 June 2015	(Netherlands) Gyliano van Velzen	(Netherlands) FC Utrecht	(Netherlands) FC Volendam	Free transfer
9 June 2015	(Netherlands) Tim Linthorst	(Netherlands) Vitesse Arnhem	(Netherlands) De Graafschap	Free transfer
12 June 2015	(Czech Republic) Josef Kvída	(Czech Republic) 1. FK Příbram	(Netherlands) PEC Zwolle	Free transfer
12 June 2015	(Netherlands) Ali Messaoud	(Netherlands) Willem II	(Liechtenstein) FC Vaduz	Free transfer
12 June 2015	(Netherlands) Paul Gladon	(Netherlands) Sparta Rotterdam	(Netherlands) Heracles Almelo	Free transfer
12 June 2015	(Netherlands) Sheraldo Becker	(Netherlands) Ajax	(Netherlands) PEC Zwolle	Loan
15 June 2015	(Denmark) Lasse Nielsen	(Netherlands) NEC	(Belgium) AA Gent	€550,000
15 June 2015	(Netherlands) Jordy Deckers	(Netherlands) Excelsior	(Netherlands) VVV-Venlo	Free transfer
15 June 2015	(Netherlands) Guus Joppen	(Netherlands) VVV-Venlo	(Netherlands) Willem II	Free transfer
15 June 2015	(Denmark) Nikolai Laursen	(Denmark) Brøndby IF	(Netherlands) PSV	€1,000,000
15 June 2015	(Netherlands) Mohamed Hamdaoui	(Netherlands) Vitesse Arnhem	(Netherlands) Go Ahead Eagles	Undisclosed
15 June 2015	(Netherlands) Giliano Wijnaldum	(Netherlands) ADO Den Haag	(Germany) VfL Bochum	Free transfer
16 June 2015	(Netherlands) Erik Quekel	(Netherlands) FC Den Bosch	(Netherlands) De Graafschap	Free transfer
17 June 2015	(Netherlands) Elvio van Overbeek	(Netherlands) PSV	(Netherlands) Go Ahead Eagles	Free transfer
17 June 2015	(Netherlands) Thijs Bouma	(Netherlands) Almere City	(Netherlands) De Graafschap	Free transfer
17 June 2015	(Netherlands) Marvin Peersman	(Netherlands) FC Dordrecht	(Netherlands) SC Cambuur	Free transfer
17 June 2015	(Netherlands) Ricky van Haaren	(Netherlands) ADO Den Haag	(Romania) Dinamo București	Free transfer
17 June 2015	(Netherlands) Jens van Son	(Netherlands) FC Eindhoven	(Netherlands) Roda JC	Free transfer
17 June 2015	(Mexico) Santiago Palacios	(Netherlands) De Treffers	(Netherlands) Roda JC	Free transfer
18 June 2015	(Netherlands) Alexander Bannink	(Netherlands) FC Emmen	(Netherlands) De Graafschap	Free transfer
18 June 2015	(Netherlands) Aleksandar Bjelica	(Netherlands) PEC Zwolle	(Netherlands) Helmond Sport	Free transfer
18 June 2015	(Netherlands) Nicky Kuiper	Unattached	(Netherlands) Willem II	Free agent
19 June 2015	(Netherlands) Peter van Ooijen	(Netherlands) Go Ahead Eagles	(Netherlands) Heracles Almelo	Free transfer
19 June 2015	(Netherlands) Bas Kuipers	(Netherlands) Ajax	(Netherlands) Excelsior	Free transfer
19 June 2015	(Netherlands) Malcolm Esajas	(Netherlands) ADO Den Haag	(Netherlands) FC Den Bosch	Free transfer
20 June 2015	(Netherlands) Kevin Brands	(Netherlands) Willem II	(Netherlands) NAC Breda	Free transfer
21 June 2015	(Netherlands) Jerry van Ewijk	(Netherlands) De Graafschap	(Netherlands) Go Ahead Eagles	Free transfer
22 June 2015	(Netherlands) Dico Koppers	(Netherlands) FC Twente	(Netherlands) Willem II	Free transfer
22 June 2015	(Netherlands) Jeroen Veldmate	(Netherlands) Heracles Almelo	(Denmark) Viborg FF	Free transfer
23 June 2015	(Netherlands) Lars Veldwijk	(England) Nottingham Forest	(Netherlands) PEC Zwolle	Loan
23 June 2015	(Sweden) Kristoffer Nordfeldt	(Netherlands) SC Heerenveen	(Wales) Swansea City	Undisclosed
24 June 2015	(Netherlands) Mitchell Dijks	(Netherlands) Willem II	(Netherlands) Ajax	€1,000,000
24 June 2015	(Netherlands) Ruben Ligeon	(Netherlands) Ajax	(Netherlands) Willem II	Loan
24 June 2015	(Netherlands) Lesly de Sa	(Netherlands) Ajax	(Netherlands) Willem II	Loan
24 June 2015	(Netherlands) Richairo Zivkovic	(Netherlands) Ajax	(Netherlands) Willem II	Loan
24 June 2015	(Poland) Przemysław Tytoń	(Netherlands) PSV	(Germany) VfB Stuttgart	€1,000,000
25 June 2015	(Netherlands) Vincent Janssen	(Netherlands) Almere City	(Netherlands) AZ	Undisclosed
25 June 2015	(Netherlands) Gino Coutinho	(Netherlands) Excelsior	(Netherlands) AZ	Free transfer
25 June 2015	(Netherlands) John Heitinga	(Germany) Hertha BSC	(Netherlands) Ajax	Free transfer
25 June 2015	(Netherlands) Lucas Bijker	(Netherlands) SC Cambuur	(Netherlands) SC Heerenveen	Free transfer
25 June 2015	(Netherlands) Darryl Lachman	(Netherlands) FC Twente	(England) Sheffield Wednesday	Undisclosed
25 June 2015	(Belgium) Gill Swerts	(Netherlands) NAC Breda	(England) Notts County	Free transfer
25 June 2015	(Netherlands) Stephen Warmolts	(Netherlands) SC Heerenveen	(Netherlands) Helmond Sport	Loan
26 June 2015	(Netherlands) Jody Lukoki	(Netherlands) PEC Zwolle	(Bulgaria) Ludogorets Razgrad	€1,000,000
26 June 2015	(Netherlands) Marko Vejinović	(Netherlands) Vitesse Arnhem	(Netherlands) Feyenoord	€3,500,000
26 June 2015	(United States) Desevio Payne	(Netherlands) FC Groningen youth team	(Netherlands) FC Groningen	Free transfer
26 June 2015	(Netherlands) Marco van Duin	(Netherlands) Almere City	(Netherlands) NEC	Free transfer
26 June 2015	(France) Nicolas Isimat-Mirin	(France) AS Monaco	(Netherlands) PSV	€3,000,000
26 June 2015	(Netherlands) Gino Bosz	(Netherlands) Vitesse Arnhem	(Netherlands) Heracles Almelo	Free transfer
26 June 2015	(England) Lewis Baker	(England) Chelsea	(Netherlands) Vitesse Arnhem	Loan
28 June 2015	(Netherlands) Mattijs Branderhorst	(Netherlands) Willem II	(Netherlands) MVV Maastricht	Loan
29 June 2015	(France) Édouard Duplan	(Netherlands) FC Utrecht	(Netherlands) ADO Den Haag	Free transfer
29 June 2015	(North Macedonia) Denis Mahmudov	(Netherlands) PEC Zwolle	(Bulgaria) Levski Sofia	Free transfer
30 June 2015	(Republic of Ireland) Jack Byrne	(England) Manchester City Reserves	(Netherlands) SC Cambuur	Loan
30 June 2015	(Portugal) Janio Bikel	(Netherlands) SC Heerenveen	(Netherlands) NEC	Free transfer
30 June 2015	(Netherlands) Caner Cavlan	(Netherlands) De Graafschap	(Netherlands) SC Heerenveen	€300,000
30 June 2015	(Netherlands) Branco van den Boomen	(Netherlands) FC Eindhoven	(Netherlands) SC Heerenveen	Undisclosed
30 June 2015	(Netherlands) Abel Tamata	(Netherlands) PSV	(Netherlands) FC Groningen	Free transfer
30 June 2015	(Netherlands) Bryan Linssen	(Netherlands) Heracles Almelo	(Netherlands) FC Groningen	€850,000
30 June 2015	(Netherlands) Luc Castaignos	(Netherlands) FC Twente	(Germany) Eintracht Frankfurt	€2,500,000^{4}
1 July 2015	(Czech Republic) Tomáš Necid	(Netherlands) PEC Zwolle	(Turkey) Bursaspor	Free transfer
1 July 2015	(Netherlands) Mohamed El Makrini	(Netherlands) SC Cambuur	(Denmark) Odense BK	Free transfer
2 July 2015	(Denmark) Andreas Bjelland	(Netherlands) FC Twente	(England) Brentford	€2,500,000
2 July 2015	(Germany) Mark Uth	(Netherlands) SC Heerenveen	(Germany) 1899 Hoffenheim	€3,000,000
2 July 2015	(Iceland) Kolbeinn Sigþórsson	(Netherlands) Ajax	(France) FC Nantes	€3,000,000
2 July 2015	(Greece) Giorgos Katsikas	(Greece) PAOK	(Netherlands) FC Twente	Free transfer
3 July 2015	(Netherlands) Mike van Duinen	(Netherlands) ADO Den Haag	(Germany) Fortuna Düsseldorf	Undisclosed
3 July 2015	(Sweden) Valmir Berisha	(Italy) AS Roma	(Netherlands) SC Cambuur	Undisclosed
4 July 2015	(France) Louis Nganioni	(France) Olympique Lyon	(Netherlands) FC Utrecht	Loan
5 July 2015	(Poland) Filip Bednarek	(Netherlands) FC Twente	(Netherlands) FC Utrecht	Free transfer
6 July 2015	(Denmark) Thomas Dalgaard	(Netherlands) SC Heerenveen	(Denmark) SønderjyskE	Free transfer
6 July 2015	(Sierra Leone) Gibril Sankoh	(China) Henan Jianye	(Netherlands) Roda JC	Free transfer
6 July 2015	(Belgium) Zakaria Bakkali	(Netherlands) PSV	(Spain) Valencia	Free transfer
6 July 2015	(Netherlands) Kenji Gorré	(Wales) Swansea City	(Netherlands) ADO Den Haag	Loan
6 July 2015	(Iceland) Hannes Þór Halldórsson	(Norway) Sandnes Ulf	(Netherlands) NEC	Undisclosed
7 July 2015	(Netherlands) Mohamed Rayhi	(Netherlands) PSV	(Netherlands) NEC	Free transfer
7 July 2015	(Germany) Andreas Ludwig	(Germany) VfR Aalen	(Netherlands) FC Utrecht	Free transfer
7 July 2015	(Brazil) Nathan	(England) Chelsea	(Netherlands) Vitesse Arnhem	Loan
7 July 2015	(Curaçao) Cuco Martina	(Netherlands) FC Twente	(England) Southampton	€1,500,000
7 July 2015	(Belgium) Yves De Winter	(Netherlands) AZ	(Belgium) Sint-Truiden	Free transfer
8 July 2015	(Belgium) Leroy Labylle	(Netherlands) PEC Zwolle	(Netherlands) MVV Maastricht	Free transfer
8 July 2015	(Israel) Ben Sahar	(Netherlands) Willem II	(Israel) Hapoel Be'er Sheva	Free transfer
9 July 2015	(Iceland) Jónatan Ingi Jónsson	(Iceland) FH Hafnarfjördur	(Netherlands) AZ	Undisclosed
9 July 2015	(Sweden) Viktor Noring	(Netherlands) SC Heerenveen	(Denmark) Lyngby BK	Free transfer
9 July 2015	(Cape Verde) Guy Ramos	(Netherlands) Roda JC	(Switzerland) FC Wil	Free transfer
10 July 2015	(Germany) Rico Strieder	(Germany) Bayern München	(Netherlands) FC Utrecht	Undisclosed
10 July 2015	(England) Isaiah Brown	(England) Chelsea	(Netherlands) Vitesse Arnhem	Loan
11 July 2015	(Netherlands) Georginio Wijnaldum	(Netherlands) PSV	(England) Newcastle United	€20,000,000
11 July 2015	(Netherlands) Erwin Mulder	(Netherlands) Feyenoord	(Netherlands) SC Heerenveen	Free transfer
11 July 2015	(Netherlands) Donovan Slijngard	(Netherlands) SC Cambuur	(Lithuania) Žalgiris Vilnius	Free transfer
12 July 2015	(Belgium) Maxime Lestienne	(Qatar) Al-Arabi SC	(Netherlands) PSV	Loan
12 July 2015	(Netherlands) Marten de Roon	(Netherlands) SC Heerenveen	(Italy) Atalanta Bergamo	Undisclosed
13 July 2015	(Netherlands) Erik Falkenburg	(Netherlands) NAC Breda	(Netherlands) Willem II	Free transfer
13 July 2015	(Serbia) Danilo Pantić	(England) Chelsea	(Netherlands) Vitesse Arnhem	Loan
13 July 2015	(Belgium) Bart Buysse	(Belgium) Cercle Brugge	(Netherlands) NEC	Free transfer
13 July 2015	(Brazil) Bruno Uvini	(Italy) Napoli	(Netherlands) FC Twente	Loan
13 July 2015	(Belgium) Jonas Heymans	(Netherlands) AZ	(Belgium) Antwerp FC	Undisclosed
13 July 2015	(Sweden) Oscar Hiljemark	(Netherlands) PSV	(Italy) Palermo	€2,500,000
13 July 2015	(Netherlands) Davy Pröpper	(Netherlands) Vitesse Arnhem	(Netherlands) PSV	€4,500,000
14 July 2015	(Netherlands) Nigel Hasselbaink	(Scotland) Hamilton Academical	(Netherlands) Excelsior	Free transfer
14 July 2015	(Australia) Michael Zullo	(Netherlands) FC Utrecht	(Australia) Melbourne City	Free transfer
15 July 2015	(Uruguay) Gastón Pereiro	(Uruguay) Nacional	(Netherlands) PSV	€7,000,000
15 July 2015	(Sweden) Simon Gustafson	(Sweden) BK Häcken	(Netherlands) Feyenoord	€2,000,000
15 July 2015	(Netherlands) Jordy Clasie	(Netherlands) Feyenoord	(England) Southampton	€10,000,000^{5}
16 July 2015	(Germany) Amin Younes	(Germany) Borussia Mönchengladbach	(Netherlands) Ajax	€3,000,000
16 July 2015	(Netherlands) Eric Verstappen	(Netherlands) VVV-Venlo	(Netherlands) De Graafschap	Free transfer
17 July 2015	(France) Yaya Sanogo	(England) Arsenal	(Netherlands) Ajax	Loan
20 July 2015	(Netherlands) Tjaronn Chery	(Netherlands) FC Groningen	(England) Queens Park Rangers	€3,000,000
20 July 2015	(Netherlands) Género Zeefuik	(Netherlands) FC Groningen	(Turkey) Balıkesirspor	Free transfer
22 July 2015	(Netherlands) Ruben Schaken	(Azerbaijan) Inter Baku	(Netherlands) ADO Den Haag	Free transfer
23 July 2015	(Netherlands) Tom Overtoom	(Netherlands) FC Volendam	(Netherlands) Excelsior	Free transfer
24 July 2015	(England) Andrew Driver	(Scotland) Aberdeen	(Netherlands) De Graafschap	Free transfer
24 July 2015	(Australia) Eli Babalj	(Netherlands) AZ	(Australia) Adelaide United	Loan
24 July 2015	(Netherlands) Dirk Marcellis	(Netherlands) NAC Breda	(Netherlands) PEC Zwolle	Free transfer
25 July 2015	(Netherlands) Queensy Menig	(Netherlands) Ajax	(Netherlands) PEC Zwolle	Loan
25 July 2015	(Australia) Rostyn Griffiths	(Australia) Perth Glory	(Netherlands) Roda JC	Free transfer
26 July 2015	(Netherlands) Maikel Kieftenbeld	(Netherlands) FC Groningen	(England) Birmingham City	€250,000
27 July 2015	(Netherlands) Jan-Arie van der Heijden	(Netherlands) Vitesse Arnhem	(Netherlands) Feyenoord	Free transfer
27 July 2015	(Netherlands) Steven Berghuis	(Netherlands) AZ	(England) Watford	€6,500,000
28 July 2015	(Netherlands) Michiel Hemmen	(Netherlands) SC Cambuur	(Sweden) BK Häcken	Free transfer
28 July 2015	(Netherlands) Mike Havekotte	(Netherlands) FC Utrecht	(Netherlands) Excelsior	Free transfer
29 July 2015	(Netherlands) Nigel Bertrams	(Netherlands) PSV	(Netherlands) Willem II	Free transfer
29 July 2015	(Netherlands) Ricardo Kishna	(Netherlands) Ajax	(Italy) Lazio	€4,000,000
30 July 2015	(Netherlands) Jesper Drost	(Netherlands) PEC Zwolle	(Netherlands) FC Groningen	Undisclosed
30 July 2015	(Nigeria) Michael Olaitan	(Greece) Olympiacos	(Netherlands) FC Twente	Loan
30 July 2015	(Netherlands) Bilal Ould-Chikh	(Netherlands) FC Twente	(Portugal) Benfica	Undisclosed
31 July 2015	(Ghana) Thomas Agyepong	(England) Manchester City	(Netherlands) FC Twente	Loan
31 July 2015	(Netherlands) Leon de Kogel	(Netherlands) FC Utrecht	(Netherlands) Go Ahead Eagles	Undisclosed
3 August 2015	(Netherlands) Gyrano Kerk	(Netherlands) FC Utrecht	(Netherlands) Helmond Sport	Loan
3 August 2015	(Portugal) Daniel Fernandes	(Netherlands) FC Twente	(United States) San Antonio Scorpions	Loan
3 August 2015	(Netherlands) Jean-Paul Boëtius	(Netherlands) Feyenoord	(Switzerland) FC Basel	€2,500,000
4 August 2015	(Uruguay) Gonzalo García García	(Cyprus) Anorthosis Famagusta	(Netherlands) Heracles Almelo	Loan
4 August 2015	(England) Todd Kane	(England) Chelsea	(Netherlands) NEC	Loan
4 August 2015	(England) Dominic Solanke	(England) Chelsea	(Netherlands) Vitesse Arnhem	Loan
4 August 2015	(Iran) Alireza Jahanbakhsh	(Netherlands) NEC	(Netherlands) AZ	€2,000,000
4 August 2015	(Serbia) Rajko Brežančić	(Serbia) FK Čukarički	(Netherlands) AZ	Undisclosed
5 August 2015	(Belgium) Tom Muyters	(Netherlands) FC Eindhoven	(Netherlands) Excelsior	Free transfer
5 August 2015	(Netherlands) Xander Houtkoop	(Netherlands) ADO Den Haag	(Netherlands) SC Cambuur	Free transfer
5 August 2015	(United States) Aron Jóhannsson	(Netherlands) AZ	(Germany) Werder Bremen	€4,200,000
5 August 2015	(Netherlands) Eljero Elia	(Germany) Werder Bremen	(Netherlands) Feyenoord	Free transfer
6 August 2015	(Slovenia) Luka Zahović	(Slovenia) NK Maribor	(Netherlands) SC Heerenveen	€700,000
6 August 2015	(Netherlands) Bart Schenkeveld	(Netherlands) Heracles Almelo	(Netherlands) PEC Zwolle	Free transfer
6 August 2015	(Costa Rica) Esteban Alvarado	(Netherlands) AZ	(Turkey) Trabzonspor	Free transfer
7 August 2015	(Netherlands) Farshad Noor	(Netherlands) PSV	(Netherlands) Roda JC	Free transfer
7 August 2015	(Netherlands) Michiel Kramer	(Netherlands) ADO Den Haag	(Netherlands) Feyenoord	€2,200,000
7 August 2015	(Netherlands) Mitchell te Vrede	(Netherlands) Feyenoord	(Netherlands) SC Heerenveen	€500,000
7 August 2015	(Netherlands) Boban Lazić	(Greece) Olympiacos	(Netherlands) PEC Zwolle	Free transfer
11 August 2015	(Netherlands) Abdel El Hasnaoui	(Netherlands) Ajax	(Netherlands) PEC Zwolle	Free transfer
11 August 2015	(Netherlands) Guyon Fernandez	(Netherlands) NAC Breda	(Australia) Perth Glory	Free transfer
11 August 2015	(Japan) Mike Havenaar	(Finland) HJK Helsinki	(Netherlands) ADO Den Haag	Undisclosed
13 August 2015	(Brazil) Eric Botteghin	(Netherlands) FC Groningen	(Netherlands) Feyenoord	€2,500,000
14 August 2015	(Netherlands) Etiënne Reijnen	(Netherlands) SC Cambuur	(Netherlands) FC Groningen	€400,000
14 August 2015	(Denmark) Kasper Larsen	(Denmark) Odense BK	(Netherlands) FC Groningen	€450,000
14 August 2015	(Netherlands) Mickey van der Hart	(Netherlands) Ajax	(Netherlands) PEC Zwolle	Undisclosed
14 August 2015	(Netherlands) Jeroen Tesselaar	Unattached	(Netherlands) De Graafschap	Free agent
14 August 2015	(Netherlands) André Krul	(Belgium) KV Turnhout	(Netherlands) SC Cambuur	Undisclosed
15 August 2015	(Australia) Tomi Juric	(Australia) Western Sydney Wanderers	(Netherlands) Roda JC	Undisclosed
15 August 2015	(Mexico) Héctor Moreno	(Spain) Espanyol	(Netherlands) PSV	€5,000,000
16 August 2015	(Netherlands) Pelle van Amersfoort	(Netherlands) SC Heerenveen	(Netherlands) Almere City	Loan
17 August 2015	(Netherlands) Martijn van der Laan	(Netherlands) FC Groningen	(Netherlands) SC Cambuur	Loan
17 August 2015	(Netherlands) Felitciano Zschusschen	(Netherlands) FC Twente	(Netherlands) FC Oss	Loan
18 August 2015	(Serbia) Uroš Đurđević	(Netherlands) Vitesse Arnhem	(Italy) Palermo	Free transfer
19 August 2015	(Netherlands) Djavan Anderson	(Netherlands) AZ	(Netherlands) SC Cambuur	Undisclosed
19 August 2015	(Netherlands) Sjoerd Ars	(Netherlands) NEC	(Netherlands) NAC Breda	Free transfer
20 August 2015	(Netherlands) Marijn de Kler	(Netherlands) Vitesse Arnhem	(Netherlands) Heracles Almelo	Free transfer
20 August 2015	(Netherlands) Nick van der Velden	(Netherlands) FC Groningen	(Netherlands) Willem II	Free transfer
20 August 2015	(Netherlands) Kyle Ebecilio	(Netherlands) FC Twente	(England) Nottingham Forest	Loan
20 August 2015	(Netherlands) Tom Beugelsdijk	(Germany) FSV Frankfurt	(Netherlands) ADO Den Haag	Free transfer
21 August 2015	(Netherlands) Ninos Gouriye	(Netherlands) ADO Den Haag	(Romania) Astra Giurgiu	Free transfer
24 August 2015	(Netherlands) Wessel Dammers	(Netherlands) Feyenoord	(Netherlands) SC Cambuur	Loan
24 August 2015	(Netherlands) Frenkie de Jong	(Netherlands) Willem II	(Netherlands) Ajax	Undisclosed
24 August 2015	(Denmark) Lucas Andersen	(Netherlands) Ajax	(Netherlands) Willem II	Loan
25 August 2015	(Netherlands) Lucas Woudenberg	(Netherlands) Feyenoord	(Netherlands) NEC	Loan
25 August 2015	(Netherlands) Joey Sleegers	(Netherlands) Feyenoord	(Netherlands) NEC	Undisclosed
25 August 2015	(Austria) Marcel Ritzmaier	(Netherlands) PSV	(Netherlands) NEC	Loan
25 August 2015	(Germany) Benjamin Kirsten	(Germany) Dynamo Dresden	(Netherlands) NEC	Free transfer
25 August 2015	(Australia) Daniel De Silva	(Italy) AS Roma	(Netherlands) Roda JC	Loan
26 August 2015	(Netherlands) Jeroen Verhoeven	(Netherlands) FC Utrecht	(Netherlands) FC Volendam	Free transfer
26 August 2015	(Netherlands) Hedwiges Maduro	(Greece) PAOK	(Netherlands) FC Groningen	Free transfer
26 August 2015	(Netherlands) Yoëll van Nieff	(Netherlands) FC Groningen	(Netherlands) Excelsior	Loan
26 August 2015	(Netherlands) Cas Peters	(Portugal) Nacional	(Netherlands) De Graafschap	Free transfer
27 August 2015	(Germany) Chinedu Ede	(Germany) FSV Mainz 05	(Netherlands) FC Twente	Free transfer
27 August 2015	(Netherlands) Ben Rienstra	(Netherlands) PEC Zwolle	(Netherlands) AZ	Undisclosed
28 August 2015	(Netherlands) Youness Mokhtar	(Netherlands) FC Twente	(Saudi Arabia) Al-Nassr	€1,000,000
28 August 2015	(Netherlands) Anco Jansen	(Netherlands) Roda JC	(Turkey) Boluspor	Undisclosed
28 August 2015	(Brazil) Gustavo Hebling	(France) Paris Saint-Germain	(Netherlands) PEC Zwolle	Loan
29 August 2015	(Netherlands) Elvis Manu	(Netherlands) Feyenoord	(England) Brighton & Hove Albion	Undisclosed
29 August 2015	(Netherlands) Tom Daemen	(Netherlands) NEC	(Netherlands) Go Ahead Eagles	Undisclosed
30 August 2015	(Netherlands) Donny Gorter	(Netherlands) AZ	(Netherlands) NAC Breda	Free transfer
31 August 2015	(Netherlands) Gévero Markiet	(Netherlands) FC Utrecht	(Netherlands) Helmond Sport	Loan
31 August 2015	(Netherlands) Yannick Cortie	(Netherlands) FC Utrecht	(Netherlands) Helmond Sport	Loan
31 August 2015	(Ghana) Richmond Boakye	(Italy) Atalanta Bergamo	(Netherlands) Roda JC	Loan
31 August 2015	(Netherlands) Stanley Elbers	(Netherlands) Helmond Sport	(Netherlands) Excelsior	Undisclosed
31 August 2015	(Netherlands) Justin Mathieu	(Netherlands) Willem II	(Netherlands) Go Ahead Eagles	Loan
31 August 2015	(Netherlands) Henrico Drost	(Netherlands) NAC Breda	(Netherlands) Excelsior	Free transfer
31 August 2015	(Netherlands) Marc Höcher	(Netherlands) Roda JC	(Germany) Rot-Weiß Erfurt	Free transfer
31 August 2015	(Netherlands) Carlo de Reuver	(Netherlands) Excelsior	(Netherlands) Helmond Sport	Loan
31 August 2015	(Mexico) Jesús Corona	(Netherlands) FC Twente	(Portugal) FC Porto	€12,000,000
31 August 2015	(Netherlands) Ouasim Bouy	(Italy) Juventus	(Netherlands) PEC Zwolle	Loan
31 August 2015	(Romania) Mihai Roman	(Romania) Pandurii Târgu Jiu	(Netherlands) NEC	€350,000
31 August 2015	(Slovakia) Adam Nemec	(United States) New York City FC	(Netherlands) Willem II	Free transfer
1 September 2015	(Democratic Republic of the Congo) Jordan Botaka	(Netherlands) Excelsior	(England) Leeds United	Undisclosed

== Notes ==
1. Transfer will take place on 9 June 2015.
2. Can rise up to €32,000,000 depending on bonuses.
3. Can rise up to €100,000 depending on bonuses.
4. Can rise up to €4,000,000 depending on bonuses.
5. Can rise up to €12,000,000 depending on results of medical tests.
6. Transfer will take place on 1 July 2015.
