= Strijbos =

Strijbos or Strijbosch is a Dutch toponymic surname referring to a "contested forest" near Gemert, North Brabant. People with the surname include:

- David Strijbos (born 1967), Dutch motocross world champion
- Jan P. Strijbos (1891–1983), Dutch naturalist, cineaste, photographer, journalist and writer
- Kevin Strijbos (born 1985), Belgian motocross racer competing
- Sam Strijbosch (born 1995), Dutch football midfielder
- Sytse Strijbos (born 1944), Dutch philosopher and systems scientist
