= Bram van Eijk =

Dutch footballer

Personal information
- Date of birth: 19 October 1996 (age 30)
- Place of birth: Schiedam, Netherlands
- Height: 1.83 m (6 ft 0 in)
- Position: Left back

Team information
- Current team: ’s-Gravenzande

Youth career
- VFC
- –2011: Excelsior Maassluis
- 2011–2015: Feyenoord

Senior career*
| Years | Team | Apps | (Gls) |
| 2015–2017 | Utrecht | 0 | (0) |
| 2016–2017 | → Jong FC Utrecht (loan) | 12 | (0) |
| 2017–2019 | Capelle | 20 | (2) |
| 2019–2020 | SteDoCo | 15 | (0) |
| 2020–2025 | Capelle | | |
| 2025– | ’s-Gravenzande | | |

International career
| 2013 | Netherlands U18 | 1 | (0) |
- * Club domestic league appearances and goals as of 16 November 2024

Bram van Eijk (born 19 October 1996) is a Dutch footballer who plays as a left back for FC 's-Gravenzande.

== Club career ==
Van Eijk played in the Feyenoord academy and joined FC Utrecht in 2015. He made his professional debut in the Eerste Divisie for Jong FC Utrecht on 19 August 2016 in a game against De Graafschap.

He joined amateur side VV Capelle in summer 2017 and left them after 8 years for FC 's-Gravenzande.
