= Cortie =

Cortie is a surname. Notable people with the surname include:

- Aloysius Cortie (1859–1925), English astronomer
- Yannick Cortie (born 1993), Dutch footballer
