= Nassim Amaarouk =

Dutch footballer (born 1996)

Personal information
- Date of birth: 1 April 1996 (age 30)
- Place of birth: Rotterdam, Netherlands
- Position: Midfielder

Youth career
- RVVH
- FC Dordrecht
- –2011: SC Feyenoord
- 2011–2014: BVV Barendrecht
- 2014–2015: NEC/FC Oss

Senior career*
Years	Team	Apps	(Gls)
2015–2017	NEC	0	(0)
2017	→ Achilles '29 (loan)	17	(1)
2017	Helmond Sport	0	(0)
2018–2019	Capelle	7	(0)
2019–2020	BVV Barendrecht	0	(0)
- * Club domestic league appearances and goals as of 11:50, 2 October 2021 (UTC)

Nassim Amaarouk (born 1 April 1996) is a Dutch footballer who plays as a midfielder.

== Club career ==
Starting his senior career with NEC, Amaarouk was sent on loan to Achilles '29 in 2017. He made his professional debut in the Eerste Divisie for the club on 6 February 2017 in a game against FC Eindhoven.

In April 2019, Amaarouk signed with BVV Barendrecht after playing one season for VV Capelle in the Hoofdklasse. He left the club after one season due to injuries, in February 2020.
