= Sam Strijbosch =

Dutch footballer

Personal information
- Full name: Sam Strijbosch
- Date of birth: 11 January 1995 (age 31)
- Place of birth: Asten, Netherlands
- Height: 1.78 m (5 ft 10 in)
- Position: Midfielder

Youth career
- NWC Asten
- 2006–2014: Helmond Sport

Senior career*
| Years | Team | Apps | (Gls) |
| 2014–2018 | Helmond Sport | 37 | (3) |
| 2017 | → Blauw Geel '38 (loan) | 7 | (1) |
| 2018–2020 | Nuenen | | |
- * Club domestic league appearances and goals

Sam Strijbosch (born 11 January 1995) is a Dutch former professional footballer. He played as a midfielder, most notably for Helmond Sport.

== Club career ==
Strijbosch played in the youth of NWC Asten and was later included in the Helmond Sport youth academy. In the summer of 2014, the midfielder was promoted to the first team.

He made his professional debut in the Eerste Divisie for Helmond Sport on 9 February 2015 in a 0–5 loss to Sparta Rotterdam. Due to injuries to Kevin Visser and Daniel Guijo-Velasco, he made his first start in his first professional appearance. Fifteen minutes before time, head coach Jan van Dijk substituted Strijbosch for Arne van Geffen. In August 2017, Strijbosch was loaned for one season to Blauw Geel '38, in order for him to gain more playing time. He returned to Helmond Sport on 22 November 2017.

Strijbosch's contract with Helmond expired in mid-2018 and he started playing for amateur club RKSV Nuenen. Strijbosch announced his retirement from football in June 2020.
