= Angelmo Vyent =

Dutch footballer

Personal information
- Date of birth: 4 September 1991 (age 35)
- Place of birth: Netherlands
- Positions: Winger; forward

Team information
- Current team: Zwarte Pijl

Senior career*
Years	Team	Apps	(Gls)
2012–2014	FC Boshuizen		
2014–2016	XerxesDZB		
2016	Scheveningen	9	(0)
2017–2018	Capelle	28	(3)
2018	AO Katastari		
2019	Episkopi		
2019	Luftëtari	11	(0)
2020	IFC		
2021–	Zwarte Pijl		
- * Club domestic league appearances and goals

Angelmo Vyent (born 4 September 1991) is a Dutch footballer who plays as a winger or attacker for Zwarte Pijl.

== Career ==
In 2012, Vyent signed for Dutch sixth tier side FC Boshuizen. In 2014, he signed for XerxesDZB in the Dutch fifth tier. In 2017, he signed for Dutch fourth tier club Capelle. In 2018, Vyent signed for AO Katastari in the Greek fourth tier. Before the second half of 2018–19, he signed for Greek third-tier team Episkopi.

In 2019, Vyent signed for Albanian outfit Luftëtari, where he made 13 appearances and scored 1 goal. On 31 August 2019, he debuted for Luftëtari during a 1–3 loss to Teuta. On 1 October 2019, Vyent scored his first goal for Luftëtari during a 2–1 win over Turbina. In 2020, he signed for IFC in the Dutch fifth tier. In 2021, Vyent signed for Dutch eighth tier side Zwarte Pijl after trialing in Slovenia and receiving interest from Kuwait.
