= Rick Mulder =

Dutch footballer

Personal information
- Full name: Siebren Mulder
- Date of birth: 7 December 1996 (age 29)
- Place of birth: Oosterhout, Netherlands
- Height: 1.90 m (6 ft 3 in)
- Position: Midfielder

Team information
- Current team: Dongen

Youth career
- SV Veerse Boys
- –2011: VV Good Luck
- 2011–2014: Dongen

Senior career*
Years	Team	Apps	(Gls)
2014–2015	Dongen		
2015–2016	RKC Waalwijk	1	(0)
2016–2019	Jong Utrecht	34	(1)
2019–2020	Cappellen	20	(3)
2020–2022	TEC	14	(2)
2022	Esperanza Pelt		
2022–2023	Kozakken Boys	21	(2)
2023–2024	SteDoCo	19	(0)
2024–	Dongen	0	(0)
- * Club domestic league appearances and goals as of 21:59, 10 July 2024 (UTC)

Siebren "Rick" Mulder (born 7 December 1996) is a Dutch footballer who plays as a midfielder for Dongen.

== Club career ==
He made his professional debut in the Eerste Divisie for RKC Waalwijk on 29 April 2016 in a game against MVV Maastricht.
