= Milad Intezar =

Afghan footballer

Personal information
- Date of birth: 4 November 1992 (age 34)
- Place of birth: Kabul, Afghanistan
- Height: 1.69 m (5 ft 7 in)
- Position: Midfielder

Team information
- Current team: SteDoCo
- Number: 8

Youth career
- CVV Renkum
- 2002–2011: NEC/FC Oss

Senior career*
Years	Team	Apps	(Gls)
2011–2012	FC Oss	15	(0)
2012–2013	DIO'30 Druten		
2013–2020	Lienden	161	(8)
2020–	SteDoCo	118	(2)

International career
2016–2022	Afghanistan	23	(0)
- * Club domestic league appearances and goals as of 02:07, 4 August 2025 (UTC)

Milad Intezar (Dari: میلاد انتظار, born 4 November 1992) is an Afghan professional footballer who plays as a midfielder for Vierde Divisie club SteDoCo.

== Club career ==
Born in Kabul, Afghanistan Intezar escaped his country with his family at age 4, emigrating to the Netherlands. At age 6, he joined local club CVV Renkum. Then, at age 9, he transferred to the youth academy of NEC Nijmegen. He left the club after almost 10 years to join FC Oss. He made his first-team debut against EVV in the KNVB, playing 7 minutes. After playing 15 games for FC Oss he left and joined FC Lienden. He won the Topklasse with FC Lienden in the seasons 2014–2015 and 2015–2016. He also won the overall championship in 2014–2015 which means his club was the best amateur club in the Netherlands.

In February 2020, it was announced that Intezar would move to Derde Divisie club SteDoCo after the 2019–20 season.

== International career ==
In 2015, Intezar received his first call-up to the Afghanistan senior side for a training camp in Dubai. However, he was not selected amongst the players for the friendly matches against Laos and Bangladesh. He eventually made his debut in September 2016 against Lebanon. In his debut he received 2 yellow cards and got suspended for the following match against Malaysia.
