= Dilivio Hoffman =

Dutch footballer (born 1997)

Personal information
- Date of birth: 11 June 1997 (age 29)
- Place of birth: Rotterdam, Netherlands
- Height: 1.78 m (5 ft 10 in)
- Position: Forward

Team information
- Current team: Baronie

Youth career
- 2005–2007: Spartaan '20
- 2007–2016: Excelsior

Senior career*
Years	Team	Apps	(Gls)
2016–2017	Jong Twente	4	(0)
2017–2019	Den Bosch	4	(0)
2019–2020	De Treffers	24	(5)
2020–2021	TEC	17	(3)
2022	Ballkani	3	(0)
2022	Hoogstraten	7	(0)
2023	Kozakken Boys	31	(1)
2024	SteDoCo	11	(0)
2024–2026	Halsteren		
2026–	Baronie		
- * Club domestic league appearances and goals as of 22:05, 10 July 2024 (UTC)

Dilivio Hoffman (born 11 June 1997) is a Dutch footballer who plays as a forward for Baronie.

== Career ==
In 2016, Hoffman signed for Dutch third-tier side Jong FC Twente. In 2017, he signed for FC Den Bosch in the Dutch second tier, where he made 4 league appearances and scored 0 goals. On 12 March 2018, Hoffman debuted for FC Den Bosch during a 1–3 loss to Helmond Sport. In 2019, he signed for Dutch third-tier club De Treffers. Before the second half of 2021–22, he signed for Ballkani in Kosovo after trialing for Turkish team Samsunspor. He then went on to play for Hoogstraten in Belgium, before returning to the Netherlands, where he played for Kozakken Boys and SteDoCo.

He left Halsteren after a two-year stint with the club in summer 2026 and was snapped up by [[]].
