= Gertjan Rothman =

Dutch footballer

- Rothman in 2006

Personal information
- Date of birth: 23 August 1983 (age 43)
- Place of birth: Gouda, Netherlands
- Positions: Defender; midfielder

Youth career
- Excelsior Rotterdam

Senior career*
Years	Team	Apps	(Gls)
2003–2007	Excelsior Rotterdam	27	(0)
2007–2018	VV Capelle		
- * Club domestic league appearances and goals

Gertjan Rothman (born 23 August 1983) is a Dutch former professional footballer who played as a defender or midfielder for Excelsior Rotterdam and VV Capelle.
