= Simon van Zeelst =

Dutch footballer

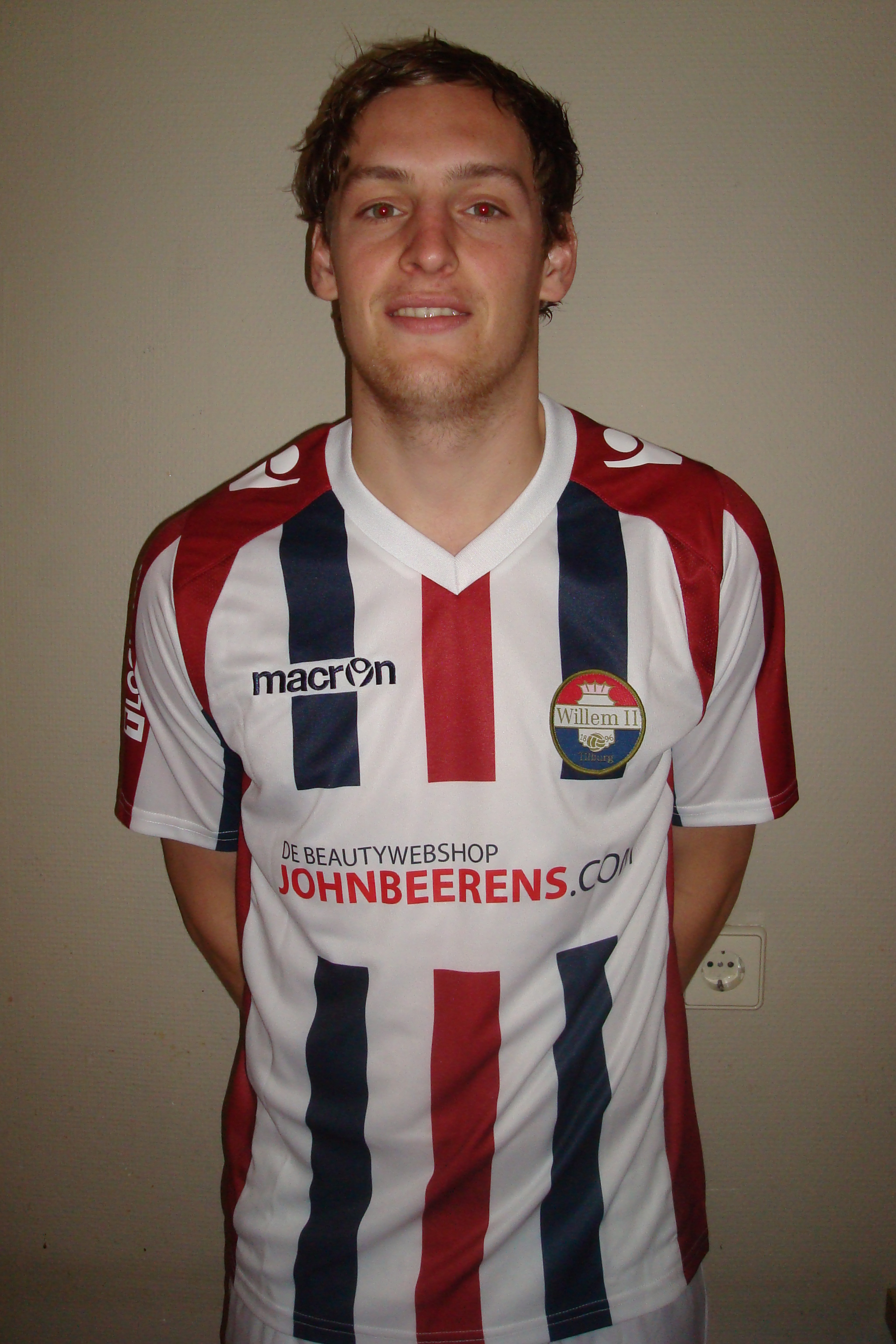
- Simon van Zeelst

Personal information
- Date of birth: 23 February 1994 (age 32)
- Place of birth: Hedel, Netherlands
- Height: 1.82 m (6 ft 0 in)
- Position: Midfielder

Team information
- Current team: SteDoCo
- Number: 16

Youth career
- VV Jan van Arckel
- RKC Waalwijk
- RJO Willem II/RKC

Senior career*
Years	Team	Apps	(Gls)
2013–2015	Willem II	8	(0)
2014–2015	→ RKC Waalwijk (loan)	31	(3)
2015–2018	JVC Cuijk	45	(2)
2018–2021	DOVO	56	(8)
2021–	SteDoCo	109	(5)
- * Club domestic league appearances and goals as of 4 August 2025

Simon van Zeelst (born 23 February 1994) is a Dutch professional footballer who plays as a midfielder for Vierde Divisie club SteDoCo.

== Career ==
van Zeelst began his career with Willem II and made his professional debut on 6 April 2013 in a 3–1 defeat against PSV Eindhoven. On 1 September 2014, he was sent on loan to RKC Waalwijk until the end of the season.

== Honours ==
=== Club ===
Willem II

- Eerste Divisie: 2013–14
