= Michel van Guldener =

Dutch footballer

Personal information
- Date of birth: 3 December 1985 (age 40)
- Place of birth: Rotterdam, Netherlands
- Height: 1.73 m (5 ft 8 in)
- Position: Striker

Youth career
- Excelsior

Senior career*
Years	Team	Apps	(Gls)
2004–2010	Excelsior	69	(8)
2010–2013	Capelle	56	(6)
2013–2017	Nieuwerkerk		
2017–2021	Hillegersberg		
- * Club domestic league appearances and goals

Michel van Guldener (born 3 December 1985) is a Dutch retired footballer.

== Career ==
Born in Rotterdam, van Guldener began his career with home-town club Excelsior, making his debut in the 2004–2005 season. In February 2009 he was severely injured in a game with MVV which would reportedly have him out of the game for a year.

The striker signed in 2010 for Topklasse team Capelle and played there three years, before moved in summer 2013 to Eerste klasse zondag team VV Nieuwerkerk.
