= VV Capelle =

Association football club in Capelle aan den IJssel, Netherlands

- Full name: Voetbalvereniging Capelle
- Founded: 20 February 1930; 95 years ago
- Ground: Sportpark 't Slot; Capelle aan den IJssel
- Capacity: 4,000
- Chairman: Jan Willem Kisjes
- Manager: Ronald Ermes
- League: Vierde Divisie
- 2022–23: Saturday Vierde Divisie A, 2nd of 16
Home colours	Away colours

Voetbalvereniging Capelle is a football club based in Capelle aan den IJssel, Netherlands. It was founded in 1930. VV Capelle plays its home matches at Sportpark 't Slot.

== History ==
Since 2018, VV Capelle competes in the Vierde Divisie.

In the 2023–24 season, Capelle qualified for the promotion playoffs.

== Associated people ==
=== Head coach ===
- Arie van der Zouwen (2005–2006)
- René Vermunt (2007–2011)
- Ronald Klinkenberg (2011–2013)
- Theo de Boon (2013–2014)
- Ton van Bremen (2014–2016)
- Winand van Loon (2016–2018)
- Ron Timmers (2018)
- Ton van Bremen (2018–2020)
- Gijs Zwaan (interim, 2020)
- Ralph Kalkman (2020–2022)
- René van Eck (2022–2023)
- Ronald Ermes (2023)>
- Kevin Vink (2024–)

=== Former players ===
Nassim Amaarouk (2018–2019); Ton van Bremen; Alex van Duijvenbode; Bram van Eijk; Driss El Akchaoui; Richard Elzinga; Jorzolino Falkenstein; Sander Fischer (2021–); Ronald Graafland; Michel van Guldener; Felino Jardim	Frank Karreman; Wilmer Kousemaker; Antoine van der Linden; Cecilio Lopes; Raphael Maitimo (2012); Jos van Nieuwstadt; Jordão Pattinama; Nick van der Ploeg; Marvin van der Pluijm; Wesley Pollemans (2021–); Sebastiaan Pot (2008–2009)	Carlo de Reuver; Jerson Ribeiro; Jeffrey Rijsdijk (2021–2023); Gertjan Rothman; Leen van Steensel; Jahri Valentijn; Birger Van de Ven; Tim Vincken; Niels Vorthoren; Angelmo Vyent (2017–2018); Kerem Yilmaz; Ismail Yildirim (2021–2022)
