= Jerson Ribeiro =

Footballer (born 1988)

Personal information
- Full name: Jerson Anes Ribeiro
- Date of birth: 9 March 1988 (age 38)
- Place of birth: Rotterdam, Netherlands
- Position: Attacking midfielder

Team information
- Current team: FC Maense

Youth career
- RKSV Activitas
- SVVSMC Schiedam
- –2007: Feyenoord

Senior career*
Years	Team	Apps	(Gls)
2007–2010	Feyenoord	0	(0)
2008–2009	→ Dordrecht (loan)	13	(0)
2009–2010	→ Excelsior (loan)	9	(3)
2010–2013	Excelsior	4	(0)
2011	→ Fortuna Sittard (loan)	14	(1)
2011–2012	→ Almere City (loan)	17	(2)
2013	Etar 1924	0	(0)
2013–2014	VV Capelle	29	(7)
2014–2015	VV Spijkenisse		
2015–2015	SC Feyenoord		
2016–2017	US Mondorf-les-Bains	4	(0)
2017–2018	ASWH		
2018–	FC Maense		

International career
2011	Cape Verde	1	(0)
- * Club domestic league appearances and goals

Jerson Anes Ribeiro (born 9 March 1988) is a former professional footballer who played as an attacking midfielder. Born in the Netherlands, he made one appearance for the Cape Verde national team.

== Club career ==
Rebeiro was born in Rotterdam. He played for FC Dordrecht in the Eerste Divisie (on loan from Feyenoord), and SBV Excelsior, with whom he spent an entire Eerste Divisie season (on loan from Feyenoord) plus the first half of the club's 2010–11 Eredivisie campaign.

He joined Fortuna Sittard of Eerste Divisie on 31 January 2011. He joined Etar 1924 Veliko Tarnovo of Bulgaria in early 2013, where he remained until August of the same year. From Bulgaria Ribeiro continued to VV Capelle, VV Spijkenisse, and SC Feyenoord in the Netherlands and to Mondorf-les-Bains in Luxembourg.

In 2017, Ribeiro joined the Dutch Derde Divisie-side ASWH from Hendrik-Ido-Ambacht. In 2018, he transferred to FC Maense.

== International career ==
In February 2011, Ribeiro was called up to the Cape Verde national team for a friendly match against Burkina Faso in Óbidos, Portugal. He made his debut, replacing Lito while Cape Verde won 1–0.
