= Mounir El Allouchi =

Dutch footballer (born 1994)

Personal information
- Date of birth: 27 September 1994 (age 32)
- Place of birth: Roosendaal, Netherlands
- Height: 1.72 m (5 ft 8 in)
- Position: Attacking midfielder

Youth career
- –2014: NAC Breda

Senior career*
Years	Team	Apps	(Gls)
2014–2021	NAC Breda	153	(26)
2015–2016	→ Helmond Sport (loan)	47	(9)
2021–2022	AS FAR	13	(1)
2022–2023	Karmiotissa	39	(10)
2023–2024	Al-Orobah	32	(7)
2025	Al-Zulfi	16	(0)
2025–2026	Willem II	30	(3)
- * Club domestic league appearances and goals as of 28 April 2026

Mounir El Allouchi (born 27 September 1994) is a Dutch footballer who plays as an attacking midfielder.

== Club career ==
He formerly played for Helmond Sport.

On 11 August 2023, El Allouchi joined Saudi First Division League club Al-Orobah. On 23 January 2025, El Allouchi joined Al-Zulfi.

On 4 September 2025, El Allouchi joined Willem II on a one-season deal.

== Personal life ==
Born in the Netherlands, El Allouchi is of Moroccan descent.
