= Marijn de Kler =

Dutch footballer

Personal information
- Date of birth: 18 April 1994 (age 31)
- Place of birth: Netherlands
- Position: Defender

Senior career*
Years	Team	Apps	(Gls)
-2015	SBV Vitesse	0	(0)
2015-2017	Heracles Almelo	1	(0)
2017-2018	Achilles '29	13	(1)
2018-2020	SV DFS		
2020-	DZC '68		
- * Club domestic league appearances and goals

Marijn de Kler (born 18 April 1994 in the Netherlands) is a Dutch footballer.
