= SteDoCo =

Dutch football club

- Full name: Voetbalvereniging Sterk Door Combinatie
- Founded: 15 April 1946; 79 years ago
- Ground: Sportpark Stedoco, Hoornaar
- Chairman: Jan den Hartog
- Manager: Dennis de Nooijer
- League: Derde Divisie
- 2024–25: Derde Divisie B, 9th of 18
- Website: http://www.stedoco.nl/
Home colours

Voetbalvereniging Sterk Door Combinatie, more commonly known as VV SteDoCo or simply SteDoCo, is a Dutch football club based in the towns of Hoornaar and Hoogblokland in the Molenlanden. It currently plays in the Derde Divisie, the fourth tier of Dutch football.

The club plays their home games at Sportpark SteDoCo. The club colours, reflected in their crest and kit, are red and black.

== History ==
Formed on 15 April 1946, SteDoCo has spent its entire existence in the amateur tiers, mostly playing in the Vierde Klasse. In 2007, SteDoCo experienced a surge towards the upper tiers of the amateur divisions, achieving five promotions in eight years, after a larger number of sponsors pushed the club towards new ambitions. Since 2018, the team competes in the fourth-tier Derde Divisie.

In the first round of the 2021–22 KNVB Cup, SteDoCo lost 5–0 to Eredivisie side FC Utrecht in front of 2,300 people.

In the 2022–23 season, SteDoCo qualified for the promotion playoffs. After beating SV TEC 6–1 on aggregate in the first round and VVSB 3–2 in the second round, SteDoCo qualified for the promotion playoff final. However, a 2–1 home loss and 2–0 away defeat to GVVV meant that SteDoCo lost 4–1 on aggregate and missed out on promotion.

In the 2023–24 season, SteDoCo finished 2nd, missing out on the title and promotion by 2 points. In the promotion playoffs, SteDoCo faced Harkemase Boys. After a 2–2 aggregate draw, SteDoCo lost 6–5 on penalties.

== Current squad ==
As of 15 March 2024

Note: Flags indicate national team as defined under FIFA eligibility rules; some limited exceptions apply. Players may hold more than one non-FIFA nationality.

No.	Pos.	Nation	Player
1	GK	NED	Maarten de Fockert
2	DF	NED	Etiën Mariana
3	DF	NED	Omar Boulamhayan
4	MF	NED	Ibrahima Touré
5	DF	NED	Yannick Cortie
6	MF	NED	Danny van Haaren
7	MF	NED	Akram Salhi
8	MF	AFG	Milad Intezar
9	FW	NED	Sjaak Kuyper
10	FW	NED	Joran Schröder
11	MF	NED	Redouan El Hankouri
12	FW	NED	Dilivio Hoffman
13	DF	NED	Tibeau van Leerdam

No.	Pos.	Nation	Player
14	DF	NED	Daniel Da Silva Mendes
15	FW	NED	Arwin van Soest
16	DF	NED	Simon van Zeelst
17	FW	NED	Fouad Belarbi
18	DF	NED	Mitchell de Zwart
19	GK	NED	Stephan Veenboer
20	MF	NED	Jeffrey van Nuland
21	GK	NED	Lars Bleijenberg
22	MF	NED	Rick Mulder
23	DF	CPV	Rodny Lopes Cabral
24	FW	ARU	Jayson Halman
25	MF	SUR	Diego Biseswar
28	FW	NED	Lars van Duuren
