= Boy van de Beek =

Dutch footballer

Personal information
- Date of birth: 13 November 1993 (age 32)
- Place of birth: Nijmegen, Netherlands
- Height: 1.85 m (6 ft 1 in)
- Position: Midfielder

Team information
- Current team: VV Germania

Youth career
- 1998–2000: SV Blauw Wit
- 2000–2009: NEC
- 2009–2011: NEC/FC Oss

Senior career*
Years	Team	Apps	(Gls)
2011–2014	Germania		
2014–2015	Alverna		
2015–2018	Achilles '29	81	(9)
2018–2021	De Treffers	70	(13)
2021–2023	Spakenburg	15	(0)
2023–	Germania		
- * Club domestic league appearances and goals as of 20:05, 2 November 2023 (UTC)

Boy van de Beek (born 13 November 1993) is a Dutch football player who plays for amateur side VV Germania.

== Club career ==
He made his professional debut in the Eerste Divisie for Achilles '29 on 7 August 2015 in a game against Jong Ajax.
