= Roel van de Sande =

Dutch footballer

Personal information
- Date of birth: 10 July 1987 (age 39)
- Place of birth: Best, Netherlands
- Height: 1.79 m (5 ft 10 1/2 in)
- Position: Midfielder

Team information
- Current team: RKVV Best Vooruit

Youth career
- Best Vooruit
- PSV
- FC Eindhoven

Senior career*
| Years | Team | Apps | (Gls) |
| 2005–2007 | FC Eindhoven | 2 | (0) |
| 2007–2014 | FC Oss | 157 | (7) |
| 2014–2016 | Helmond Sport | 64 | (6) |
| 2016–2018 | RKC Waalwijk | 24 | (1) |
| 2017–2018 | → FC Oss (loan) | 10 | (0) |
| 2018–2021 | OJC Rosmalen | 43 | (4) |
| 2021– | RKVV Best Vooruit | | |
- * Club domestic league appearances and goals as of 11 October 2020

Roel van de Sande (born 10 July 1987) is a Dutch professional footballer who plays as a midfielder for RKVV Best Vooruit.
