= Jeffrey van Nuland =

Dutch footballer (born 1990)

Personal information
- Full name: Jeffrey van Nuland
- Date of birth: 16 December 1990 (age 35)
- Place of birth: Tilburg, Netherlands
- Height: 1.83 m (6 ft 0 in)
- Position: Centre back

Team information
- Current team: SteDoCo
- Number: 20

Youth career
- SVG
- RKC Waalwijk

Senior career*
Years	Team	Apps	(Gls)
2009	RKC Waalwijk	2	(0)
2009–2011	Jong PSV	0	(0)
2011–2013	Willem II	9	(1)
2012–2013	→ Helmond Sport (loan)	22	(1)
2013–2014	Esperanza Neerpelt		
2014–2016	Helmond Sport	66	(2)
2016–2022	Kozakken Boys	128	(4)
2022–	SteDoCo	108	(6)

International career
2008	Netherlands U18	1	(0)
2008–2009	Netherlands U19	7	(0)
- * Club domestic league appearances and goals as of 18:31, 12 December 2025 (UTC)

Jeffrey van Nuland (born 16 December 1990) is a Dutch footballer who plays as a centre back for SteDoCo.
