= Jan P. Strijbos =

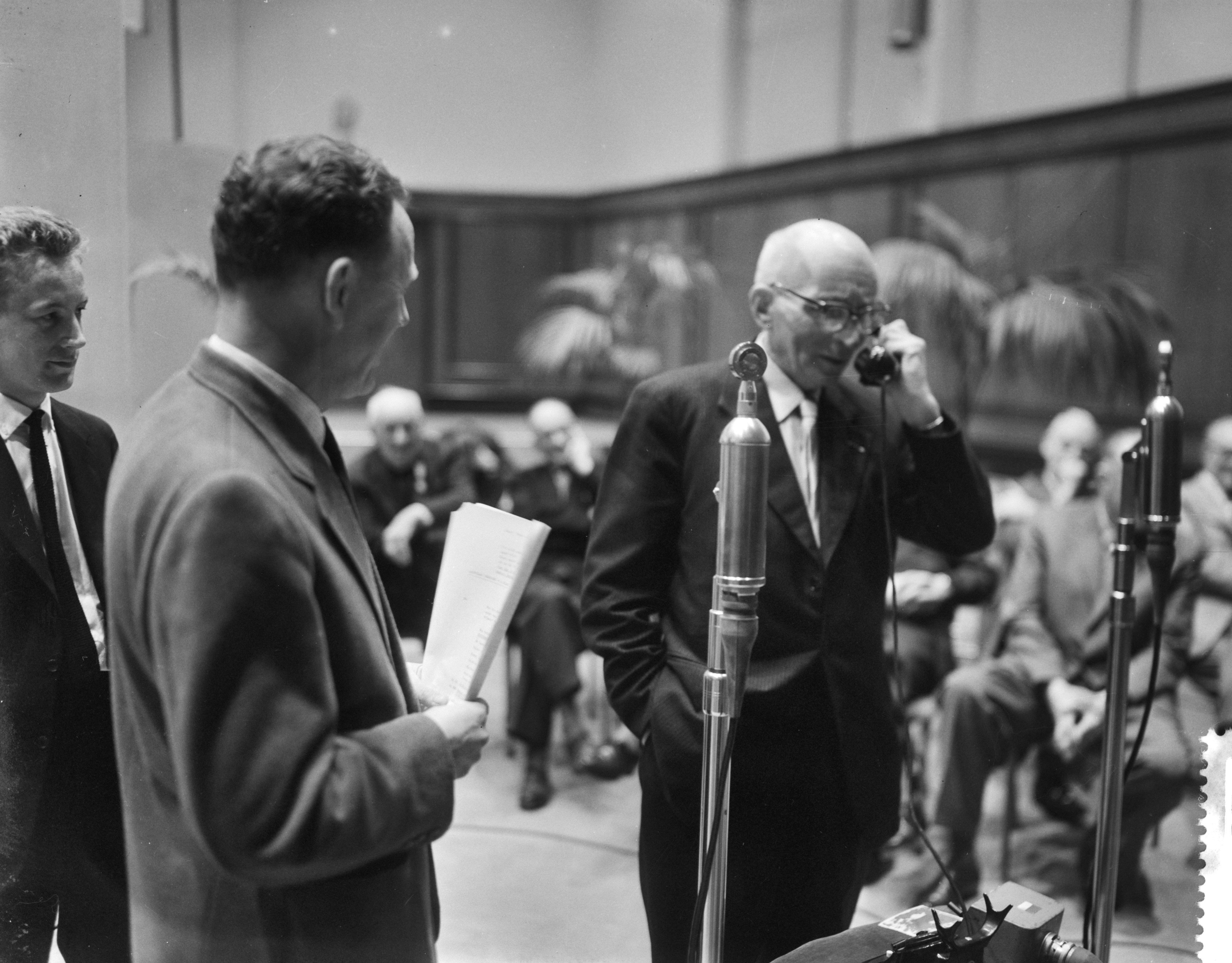
Jan Strijbos (1959)

Jan Pieter "Jan P." Strijbos (March 14, 1891 – May 10, 1983) was a Dutch naturalist, cineaste, photographer, journalist, writer and public speaker of the nature (and birds in particular) protection movement.

Strijbos grew up in Haarlem and initially worked as an architectural engineer. He became more and more interested in birds and chose to start publishing on the subject in 1927. Daily newspapers such as Het Parool and De Telegraaf frequently reserved space for his popular columns. His first major work was the first part of What's that bird called (Dutch: Hoe heet die vogel?), followed by part two in 1930. He also wrote a richly illustrated book on the breeding of the grey heron before becoming involved in photography. His most notable achievement in that field was the material he created in the pre-war great cormorant colony in Lekkerkerk. He also created visual material for the promotion of his cause, which he mainly used for his lectures. His friend and Nobel Prize winning ethologist Niko Tinbergen characterised him in a preface he has written for Strijbos' 1956 book about South Africa as follows: "(...) the tramp, the carefree enjoyer, the admirer, the minstrel, and the ambassadeur of all things living, the witty conversationalist".

== Photographs by Strijbos ==
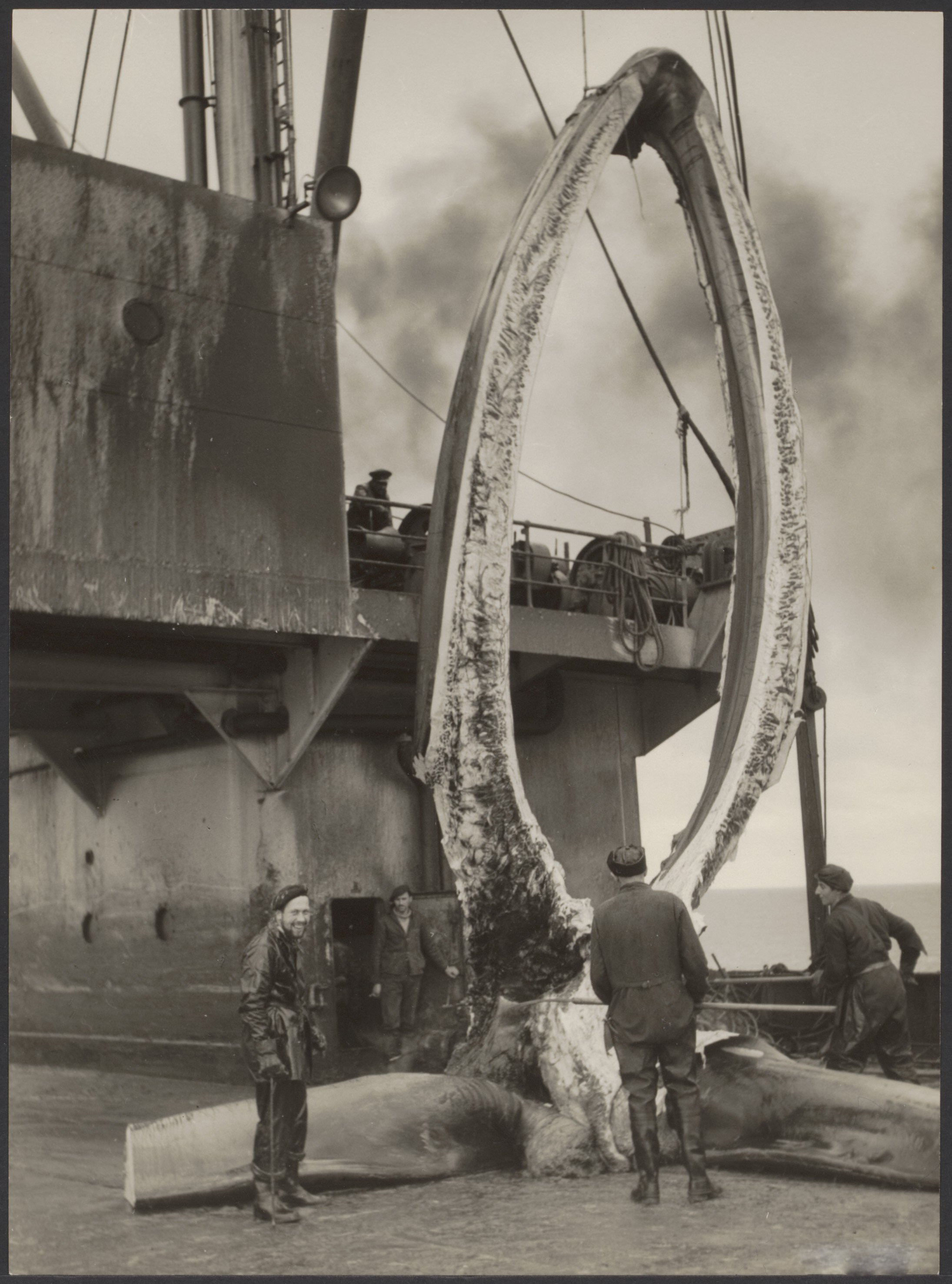
Whaling 1947

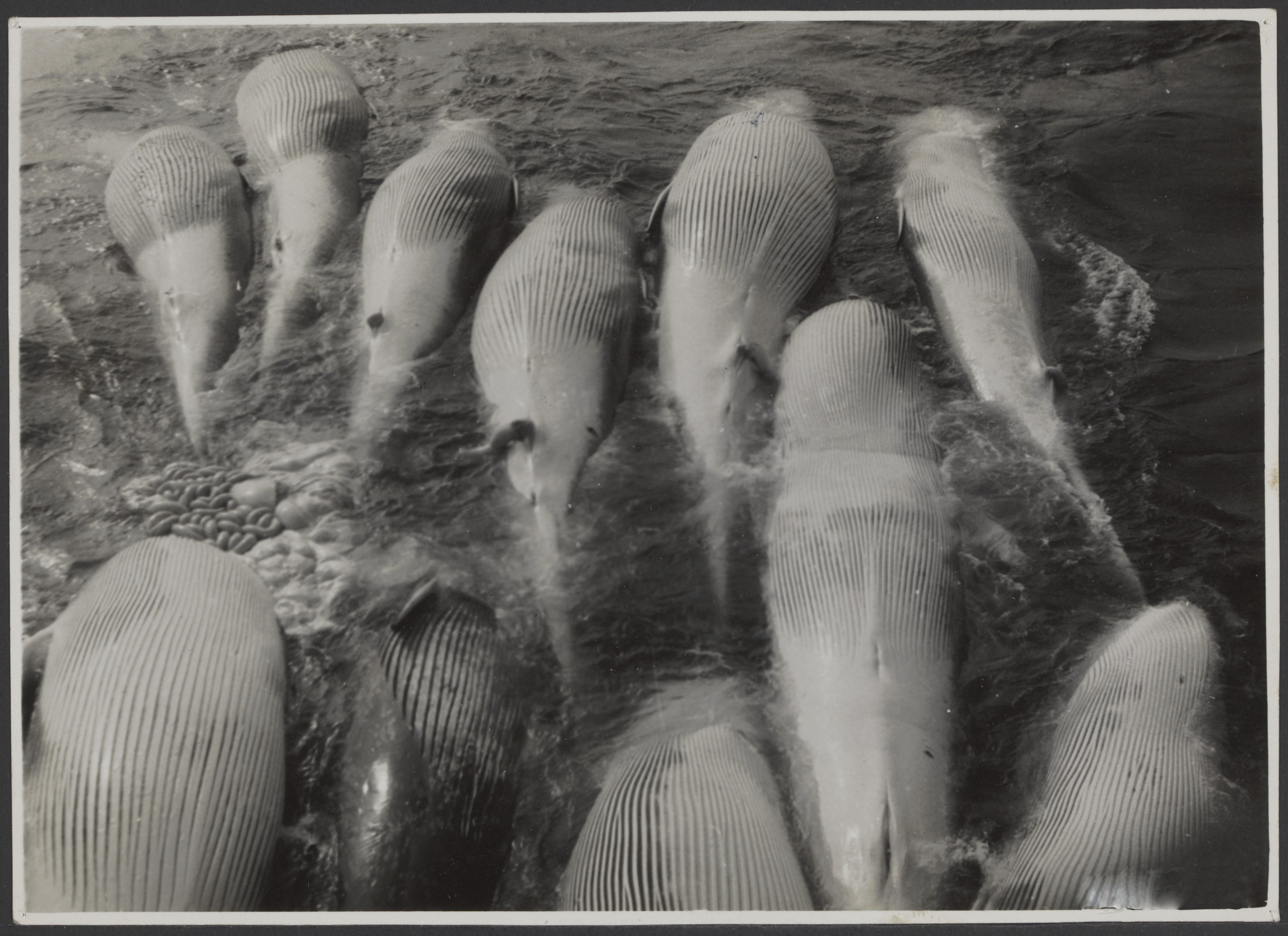

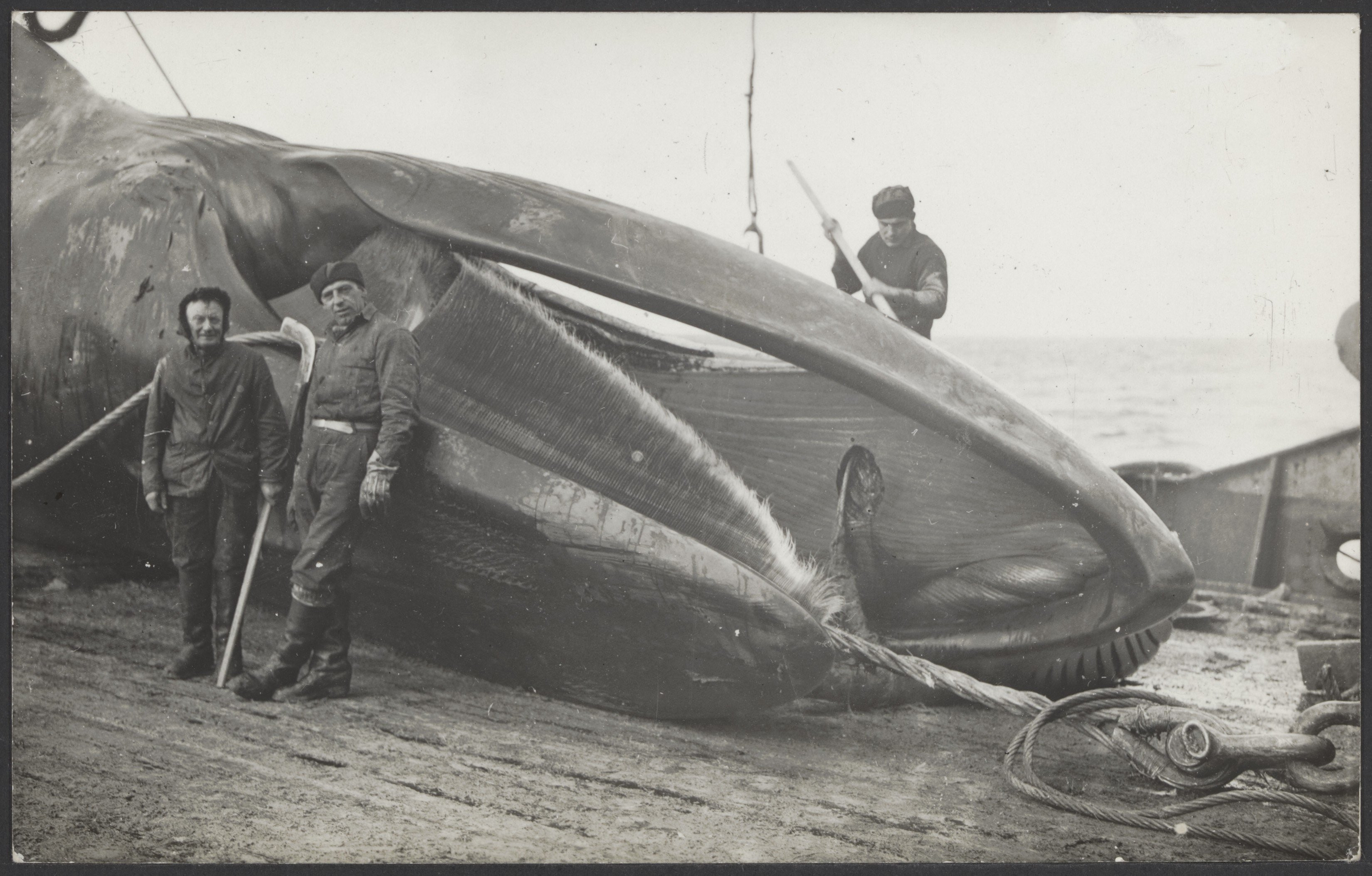
