= Kevin Visser =

Dutch footballer (born 1988)

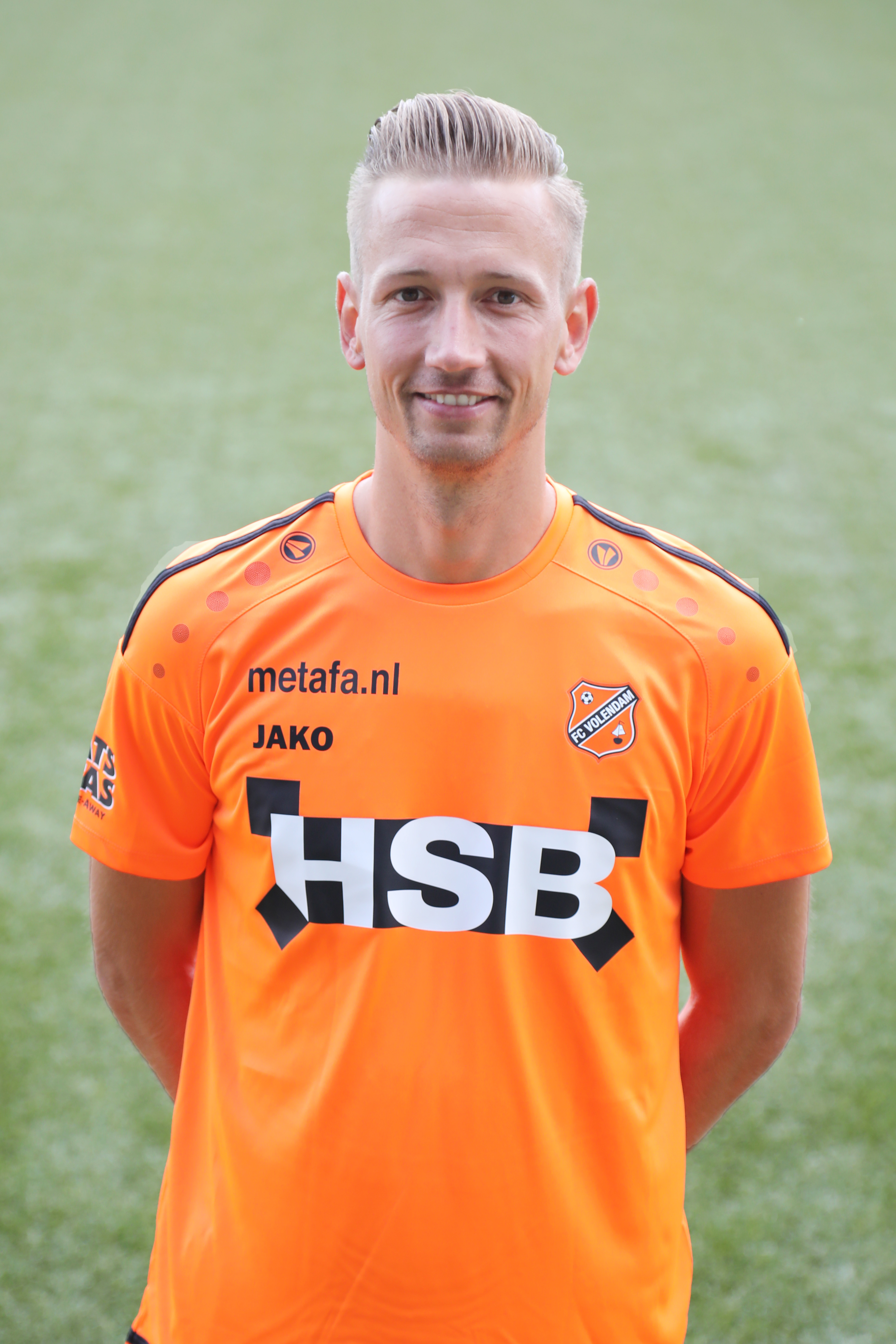
- Visser with FC Volendam

Personal information
- Date of birth: 19 July 1988 (age 38)
- Place of birth: Delft, Netherlands
- Height: 1.82 m (6 ft 0 in)
- Position: Midfielder

Team information
- Current team: AFC
- Number: 26

Youth career
- Vitesse Delft
- Delfia
- DHC Delft
- TONEGIDO
- 2008–2009: RKC Waalwijk
- 2009–2010: ADO Den Haag

Senior career*
Years	Team	Apps	(Gls)
2010–2013	ADO Den Haag	58	(1)
2013–2016	Helmond Sport	91	(7)
2016–2022	Volendam	136	(13)
2022–	AFC	19	(2)
- * Club domestic league appearances and goals as of 29 March 2023

Kevin Visser (born 19 July 1988) is a Dutch professional footballer who plays as a midfielder for AFC.

== Career ==
=== ADO Den Haag ===
As a youth, Visser played for Vitesse Delft, Delfia, DHC Delft, TONEGIDO, RKC Waalwijk and ADO Den Haag.

Visser made his debut in professional football on 15 August 2010 in a match for ADO against Roda JC. He scored his first senior goal in a match against De Graafschap in September 2010 after having come on as a substitute.

=== Helmond Sport ===
On 21 May 2013, Visser signed a three-year contract with Eerste Divisie club Helmond Sport. Upon signing, he stated that he had chosen to move to a club from the second division in order to develop as a player. He made his debut on 2 August in a 2–2 away draw against Excelsior.

Visser scored his first goals for Helmond Sport on 7 November 2014 – a hat-trick – in a 5–2 league win over Telstar.

=== Volendam ===
Visser signed a two-year contract with FC Volendam in June 2016. On 5 August, he made his debut for the club in the league game against Almere City. On 9 December, he scored his first goal in a 6–0 away win over Achilles '29.

During his time at the club, Visser grew into team captain and a fixed value in central midfield.

Visser suffered a serious knee injury during a team practice in July 2020, sidelining him for more than a year. On 6 August 2021, he made his official comeback, coming on as a substitute in the 61st minute of a 2–2 league draw against FC Eindhoven for Calvin Twigt.

=== AFC ===
On 2 May 2022, Visser agreed to join third-tier AFC for the 2022–23 season.

== Career statistics ==
As of 9 October 2021

Appearances and goals by club, season and competition
Club	Season	League			Cup		Other		Total	
Club	Season	Division	Apps	Goals	Apps	Goals	Apps	Goals	Apps	Goals
ADO Den Haag	2010–11	Eredivisie	18	1	0	0	4 (Note: Appearance in Eredivisie UEFA Europa League play-off)	0	22	1
ADO Den Haag	2011–12	Eredivisie	21	0	0	0	—		21	0
ADO Den Haag	2012–13	Eredivisie	19	0	1	0	—		20	0
ADO Den Haag	Total		58	1	1	0	4	0	63	1
Helmond Sport	2013–14	Eerste Divisie	27	0	1	0	—		28	0
Helmond Sport	2014–15	Eerste Divisie	31	5	1	0	—		32	5
Helmond Sport	2015–16	Eerste Divisie	33	2	2	0	—		35	2
Helmond Sport	Total		91	7	4	0	—		95	7
FC Volendam	2016–17	Eerste Divisie	24	3	3	0	—		27	3
FC Volendam	2017–18	Eerste Divisie	34	6	2	0	—		36	6
FC Volendam	2018–19	Eerste Divisie	36	3	1	0	—		37	3
FC Volendam	2019–20	Eerste Divisie	27	1	1	0	—		28	1
FC Volendam	2020–21	Eerste Divisie	0	0	0	0	—		0	0
FC Volendam	2021–22	Eerste Divisie	2	0	0	0	—		2	0
FC Volendam	Total		123	13	7	0	—		130	13
Career total			272	21	12	0	4	0	288	21
