= Kai Heerings =

Dutch footballer (born 1990)

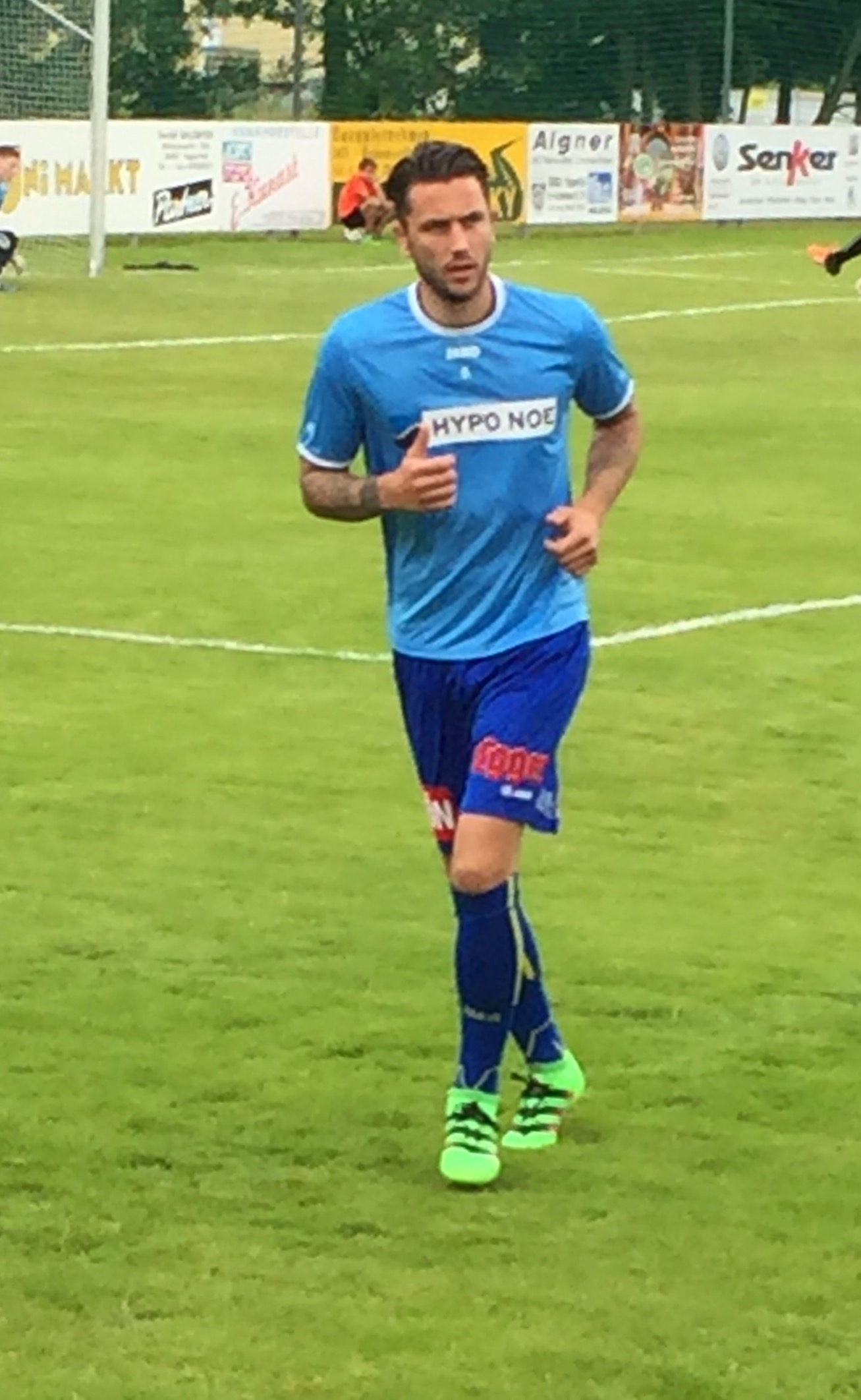

Personal information
- Date of birth: 12 January 1990 (age 36)
- Place of birth: Amsterdam, Netherlands
- Height: 1.91 m (6 ft 3 in)
- Position: Centre-back

Team information
- Current team: SV De Meteoor
- Number: 13

Youth career
- RCZ
- –2000: ZVV Zilvermeeuwen
- 2000–2007: Ajax
- 2007–2008: Volendam
- 2008–2009: Utrecht

Senior career*
Years	Team	Apps	(Gls)
2009–2015	Jong Utrecht	29	(1)
2011–2015	Utrecht	59	(1)
2015–2016	Cambuur	5	(0)
2016	→ Helmond Sport (loan)	10	(1)
2016–2017	SKN St. Pölten	5	(0)
2016	SKN St. Pölten II	3	(0)
2017	FC Homburg	14	(0)
2017–2019	Fortuna Sittard	32	(0)
2019	NorthEast United	11	(0)
2020–2021	MVV	11	(0)
2021	THOI Lakatamia		
2021–2023	IJsselmeervogels	45	(4)
2023–2025	Ajax Amateurs		
- * Club domestic league appearances and goals as of 7 October 2024

Kai Heerings (born 12 January 1990) is a Dutch footballer who plays as a centre-back for amateur club SV De Meteoor.

== Career ==
Raised in Zaandam, Heerings was promoted to the first team of FC Utrecht from its youth academy in 2011. He made his professional debut on 20 August 2011, in a match against Vitesse. In 2010, he had signed his first senior contract with the club; a two-year deal with a two-year option. Heerings was ultimately part of the first team of Utrecht for four years, culminating in fifth-place finish in the Eredivisie in the 2012–13 season. He himself made 17 league appearances that season.

Heerings signed a one-year contract with SC Cambuur in May 2015, with an option for another season, as he was set to replace the outgoing Lucas Bijker. However, he only made five appearances for the club, before being sent on a six-month loan to Helmond Sport in the second-tier Eerste Divisie for the remainder of the 2015–16 season in January 2016.

Heerings signed a two-year contract with Austrian club SKN St. Pölten in June 2016, who had won the second-tier Austrian Football Second League in the previous season and thus promoted to the Austrian Bundesliga. In January 2017, he moved to Germany to Regionalliga club FC 08 Homburg, with whom he received a contract valid until June 2019. After the club suffered relegation from the Regionalliga Südwest, he returned to the Netherlands, where he joined the second division club Fortuna Sittard, where he also received a contract valid until June 2019.

In September 2019, after his contract with Fortuna expired, Heerings committed to Indian Super League club NorthEast United for two seasons.

Heerings signed a one-year contract with MVV Maastricht in August 2020, which took him over on as a free agent. He left them for Greek outfit THOI Lakatamia after half a year.

On 19 August 2021, he joined IJsselmeervogels and in 2023 he returned to Ajax to play for Ajax Amateurs. He moved to fellow amateur side SV De Meteoor in 2025.

== Personal life ==
With his brother-in-law, Heerings has developed the JZ Design Game Case, a portable case and monitor for games consoles. The product was inspired by Heerings' own experiences of boredom when travelling for football matches, and the case has proved popular among professional athletes. Customers include Lionel Messi, Sergio Aguero and Lewis Hamilton.
