= Carlo de Reuver =

Dutch footballer

Personal information
- Full name: Carlo de Reuver
- Date of birth: 29 January 1995 (age 31)
- Place of birth: Rotterdam, Netherlands
- Height: 1.80 m (5 ft 11 in)
- Position: Striker

Team information
- Current team: DCV Krimpen

Youth career
- DCV Krimpen
- Excelsior

Senior career*
Years	Team	Apps	(Gls)
2013–2017	Excelsior	18	(3)
2015–2016	→ Helmond Sport (loan)	22	(2)
2017	→ VV Capelle (loan)	13	(2)
2017–	DCV Krimpen		
- * Club domestic league appearances and goals as of 6 January 2023

Carlo de Reuver (born 29 January 1995) is a Dutch professional footballer who currently plays as a striker for DCV Krimpen.
