= Daniel Guijo-Velasco =

Belgian footballer

Personal information
- Full name: Daniel Guijo-Velasco
- Date of birth: 24 February 1984 (age 42)
- Place of birth: Hasselt, Belgium
- Height: 1.82 m (6 ft 0 in)
- Position: Midfielder

Youth career
- Sporting Houthalen
- Genk
- 1998–2003: PSV

Senior career*
| Years | Team | Apps | (Gls) |
| 2003–2004 | PSV | 2 | (0) |
| 2004–2006 | AGOVV | 64 | (13) |
| 2006–2008 | Excelsior | 34 | (3) |
| 2008–2015 | Helmond Sport | 133 | (6) |
| Total | | 233 | (22) |
- * Club domestic league appearances and goals

Daniel Guijo-Velasco (born 24 February 1984) is a Belgian former professional footballer who played as a midfielder.

Born in Hasselt, Belgium with a Spanish background, Guijo-Velasco was part of the PSV youth academy, before making his first professional appearances in 2004. After stints at AGOVV and Excelsior, he had his most successful period at Helmond Sport, where he made more than 100 appearances and grew out to become team captain. He retired in 2015 after being diagnosed with a rare, autoimmune disease, and since became a psychiatric nurse.

== Career ==
=== PSV ===
Guijo-Velasco played in the PSV youth academy and made two appearances as a substitute for their first team. His first professional appearance came on 1 November 2003 in a 1–3 away win over NAC Breda, when he came on as a substitute for Theo Lucius in the 82nd minute. His second and final game for PSV came a month later, in a 7–0 home win over FC Volendam where he came on for Mateja Kežman, who had scored a hat-trick.

=== AGOVV ===
At the end of the 2003–04 season, Guijo-Velasco signed for AGOVV Apeldoorn in the Eerste Divisie, where he was a regular in midfield for two seasons under head coach Jurrie Koolhof. He scored his first goal in professional football on 1 October 2004, in a 4–1 home win over TOP Oss. He finished the season with seven goals, as AGOVV finished 10th in the league table. The following season, he grew out to become a key player for the team, and was rewarded with a move to Eredivisie club Excelsior.

=== Excelsior ===
At Excelsior, he immediately made an impact alongside other key players such as Luigi Bruins and Andwélé Slory, in the team coached by Ton Lokhoff. Thus, relegation was avoided at the end of the season, with Guijo-Velasco as part of the central midfielder due with René van Dieren. However, the following season ended in disappointment after Bruins and Slory had left for Feyenoord, and Guijo-Velasco only made 10 league appearances in which he scored one goal. Excelsior finished last in the league table, and suffered relegation to the second-tier Eerste Divisie.

=== Helmond Sport ===
On 30 May 2008, Guijo-Velasco moved to Helmond Sport on a two-year contract. He made his debut for the club on 8 August against his old team AGOVV. The game was lost 1–2, but nevertheless, the team experienced a reasonable season that ended in tenth place. Together with Ilja van Leerdam and former Telstar icon Sjaak Lettinga, Guijo-Velasco formed an experienced midfield, while Dirk Jan Derksen was the goal-poacher in front. Guijo-Velasco was known as a driven player with a strong will to win, but was discredited after he gave the Nazi salute to an opponent against RBC Roosendaal. He subsequently stated that his opponent "played like a German" and he wanted to show this. Helmond Sport suspended him for one match following this incident and instructed him to help with a social school project. The Royal Dutch Football Association (KNVB) suspended him for five matches.

Guijo-Velasco became an important player for the club, and in the 2012–13 season, the Belgian even became team captain of the club. In the spring of 2013, however, Guijo-Velasco suffered from a neck hernia which began a downward spiral for him. He was found to be suffering from a rare autoimmune disease affecting only around 40 total people in the world, and he was sidelined for a substantial period of time. Guijo-Velasco missed the entire 2013–14 season, but the following year he attempted a comeback, as he made seven official appearances for the Helmond team. In the summer of 2015, Guijo-Velasco decided to retire from professional football due to his illness and focus on a career in psychiatry. He made his final professional appearance at home against RKC Waalwijk on 27 February 2015. In the match, which was won 3–0, he came in as a substitute in the last ten minutes.

After his retirement from football, he has worked as a psychiatric nurse. He also played at amateur level for KFC Diest.
