= Aleksandar Bjelica =

Serbian professional footballer

Personal information
- Date of birth: 7 January 1994 (age 32)
- Place of birth: Vrbas, FR Yugoslavia
- Height: 1.87 m (6 ft 1 1/2 in)
- Position: Centre-back

Team information
- Current team: Koninklijke HFC

Youth career
- Quick Boys
- Ajax
- Katwijk
- ADO Den Haag
- Utrecht

Senior career*
Years	Team	Apps	(Gls)
2013–2014	Utrecht	4	(0)
2014	→ Sparta Rotterdam (loan)	5	(0)
2015	PEC Zwolle	3	(0)
2015	Helmond Sport	17	(5)
2016–2017	KV Mechelen	39	(3)
2017–2019	Oostende	37	(4)
2019–2020	Korona Kielce	3	(0)
2019–2020	→ ADO Den Haag (loan)	2	(0)
2020–2021	Gorica	11	(1)
2021	Spartak Subotica	4	(0)
2022–2023	Quick Boys	22	(1)
2023–2025	IJsselmeervogels	15	(1)
2025–	Koninklijke HFC		

International career
2016	Serbia U21	2	(0)
- * Club domestic league appearances and goals as of 01:29, 15 October 2024 (UTC)

Aleksandar Bjelica (born 7 January 1994) is a Serbian professional footballer who plays as a centre-back for Koninklijke HFC.

== Club career ==
He formerly played for FC Utrecht who loaned him to Sparta Rotterdam. He was released by Utrecht after he was sent back by Sparta when he controversially demanded a place in their starting line-up in a game against NEC. He then moved to PEC Zwolle and later joined Helmond Sport in summer 2015.

He moved abroad to succeed Miloš Kosanović at Belgian side KV Mechelen in January 2016.

On 2 September 2019, he joined Dutch club ADO Den Haag on a season-long loan.

On 14 August 2021, he signed with Spartak Subotica for the rest of the year. In May 2023, Bjelica signed with his former childhood club, Quick Boys. In August 2023, the club's manager confirmed that Bjelica was no longer part of the A squad. However, he would not comment on the reason.

After an injury-hit period with IJsselmeervogels, Bjelica joined Koninklijke HFC in summer 2025.

== International career ==
Bjelica has represented Serbia at under-21 level, making two appearances.

== Career statistics ==
As of match played 22 December 2019

Appearances and goals by club, season and competition
Club	Season	League			National cup (Note: Includes KNVB Cup, Belgian Cup)		Other		Total	
Club	Season	Division	Apps	Goals	Apps	Goals	Apps	Goals	Apps	Goals
FC Utrecht	2013–14	Eredivisie	4	0	0	0	0	0	4	0
Sparta Rotterdam (loan)	2014–15	Eerste Divisie	5	0	1	0	0	0	6	0
PEC Zwolle	2014–15	Eredivisie	3	0	1	0	0	0	4	0
Helmond Sport	2015–16	Eerste Divisie	17	5	2	0	0	0	19	5
KV Mechelen	2015–16	Belgian Pro League	13	0	0	0	0	0	13	0
KV Mechelen	2016–17	Belgian First Division A	25	3	2	0	1	0	28	3
KV Mechelen	Total		38	3	2	0	1	0	41	3
KV Oostende	2017–18	Belgian First Division A	24	2	3	0	5	1	32	3
KV Oostende	2018–19	Belgian First Division A	8	1	1	0	0	0	9	1
KV Oostende	Total		32	3	4	0	5	1	41	4
Korona Kielce	2018–19	Ekstraklasa	3	0	0	0	0	0	3	0
ADO Den Haag (loan)	2019–20	Eredivisie	2	0	0	0	0	0	2	0
Career total			104	11	11	0	6	1	121	12
