= Yannick Cortie =

Dutch footballer (born 1993)

Personal information
- Date of birth: 7 May 1993 (age 33)
- Place of birth: Amsterdam, Netherlands
- Height: 1.83 m (6 ft 0 in)
- Position: Left back

Team information
- Current team: SteDoCo
- Number: 5

Youth career
- RKSV Pancratius
- 2006–2014: Utrecht

Senior career*
Years	Team	Apps	(Gls)
2014–2016	Utrecht	7	(0)
2015–2016	→ Helmond Sport (loan)	24	(3)
2016–2017	Teutonia	5	(0)
2017–2020	IJsselmeervogels	34	(1)
2020–	SteDoCo	114	(5)
- * Club domestic league appearances and goals as of 01:53, 4 August 2025 (UTC)

Yannick Cortie (born 7 May 1993) is a Dutch professional footballer who plays as a left back for Vierde Divisie club SteDoCo. He formerly played for FC Utrecht and Helmond Sport.

Cortie joined SteDoCo from IJsselmeervogels in summer 2020.
