= 2010–11 Hoofdklasse =

Hoofdklasse
- Season: 2010–11

The 2010–11 season of the Hoofdklasse was competed in six leagues, three Saturday leagues and three Sunday leagues. The Champions of each group promoted direct to the Topklasse.

== League tables ==
=== Saturday A ===
Pos	Team	Pld	W	D	L	GF	GA	GD	Pts	Promotion or relegation
1	Quick Boys	26	17	7	2	64	25	+39	58	Promoted to Topklasse
2	Noordwijk	26	18	4	4	57	24	+33	58	Promotion playoff
3	Young Boys	26	16	3	7	58	34	+24	48 (Note: -3 points)	Promotion playoff
4	Scheveningen	26	13	7	6	47	28	+19	46	Promotion playoff
5	Excelsior Maassluis	26	13	6	7	51	39	+12	45	
6	ODIN '59	26	13	5	8	40	29	+11	39 (Note: -5 points)	
7	RKAV Volendam	26	10	4	12	52	54	−2	34	
8	Voorschoten '97	26	9	5	12	32	49	−17	32	
9	Ter Leede	26	8	6	12	28	51	−23	30	
10	Jodan Boys	26	8	5	13	35	45	−10	29	
11	Zwaluwen '30	26	7	6	13	36	45	−9	27	Relegation playoffs
12	Huizen	26	6	5	15	38	54	−16	23	Relegation playoffs
13	Swift	26	5	2	19	28	64	−36	17	Relegated to the Eerste Klasse
14	Vitesse Delft	26	5	3	18	28	53	−25	16 (Note: -2 points)	Relegated to the Eerste Klasse

==== Championship ====
Team 1	Score	Team 2
Quick Boys	0–1	Noordwijk

=== Saturday B ===
Pos	Team	Pld	W	D	L	GF	GA	GD	Pts	Promotion or relegation
1	GVVV	26	20	2	4	77	31	+46	62	Promoted to Topklasse
2	XerxesDZB	26	16	3	7	70	49	+21	51	Promotion playoff
3	Montfoort	26	12	6	8	40	33	+7	42	Promotion playoff
4	ASWH	26	11	8	7	53	32	+21	41	
5	Zwaluwen	26	10	8	8	47	36	+11	38	
6	Kozakken Boys	26	9	9	8	48	36	+12	36	
7	RVVH	26	9	8	9	36	41	−5	35	
8	Heerjansdam	26	9	8	9	39	48	−9	35	Promotion playoff
9	Kloetinge	26	9	7	10	31	39	−8	34	
10	Nieuw Lekkerland	26	8	6	12	36	48	−12	30	
11	LRC	26	6	11	9	41	50	−9	28 (Note: -1 point)	Relegation playoffs
12	NSC	26	6	8	12	36	56	−20	26	Relegation playoffs
13	Rijsoord	26	7	3	16	37	59	−22	24	Relegated to the Eerste Klasse
14	DTS Ede	26	4	5	17	24	57	−33	17	Relegated to the Eerste Klasse

=== Saturday C ===
Pos	Team	Pld	W	D	L	GF	GA	GD	Pts	Promotion or relegation
1	SVZW	26	15	7	4	54	30	+24	52	Promoted to Topklasse
2	WHC	26	15	4	7	61	31	+30	49	Promotion playoff
3	Staphorst	26	14	3	9	52	43	+9	45	Promotion playoff
4	ONS Sneek	26	12	8	6	42	23	+19	44	
5	ACV	26	11	5	10	50	42	+8	38	
6	SDC Putten	26	10	7	9	44	42	+2	37	Promotion playoff
7	DETO	26	11	3	12	39	40	−1	36	
8	Berkum	26	10	5	11	42	46	−4	35	
9	Nunspeet	26	10	5	11	40	49	−9	35	
10	Drachtster Boys	26	10	4	12	44	53	−9	34	
11	DVS '33	26	8	4	14	40	49	−9	28	Relegation playoffs
12	Oranje Nassau	26	8	3	15	30	51	−21	27	Relegation playoffs
13	PKC '83	26	6	8	12	39	52	−13	26	Relegated to the Eerste Klasse
14	HZVV	26	7	4	15	34	60	−26	24 (Note: -1 points)	Relegated to the Eerste Klasse

=== Sunday A ===
Pos	Team	Pld	W	D	L	GF	GA	GD	Pts	Promotion or relegation
1	HBS Craeyenhout	26	15	4	7	48	27	+21	49	Promoted to Topklasse
2	Chabab	26	13	7	6	40	25	+15	46	Promotion playoff
3	ADO '20	26	13	4	9	50	32	+18	43	Promotion playoff
4	SC Feyenoord	26	11	9	6	52	35	+17	42	Promotion playoff
5	AFC '34	26	11	4	11	36	39	−3	37	
6	Elinkwijk	26	10	7	9	37	42	−5	37	
7	De Zouaven	26	9	8	9	33	31	+2	35	
8	Leonidas	26	9	7	10	41	40	+1	34	
9	DHC Delft	26	9	7	10	51	52	−1	34	
10	Nieuwenhoorn	26	8	9	9	36	40	−4	33	
11	Alphense Boys	26	9	6	11	40	49	−9	33	Relegation playoffs
12	Westlandia	26	9	4	13	41	44	−3	31	Relegation playoffs
13	JOS Watergraafsmeer	26	6	10	10	31	37	−6	28	Relegated to the Eerste Klasse
14	IFC	26	4	6	16	32	75	−43	18	Relegated to the Eerste Klasse

=== Sunday B ===
Pos	Team	Pld	W	D	L	GF	GA	GD	Pts	Promotion or relegation
1	UNA	26	16	6	4	55	24	+31	54	Promoted to Topklasse
2	EHC	26	13	3	10	53	49	+4	42	Promotion playoff
3	Dongen	26	11	8	7	53	40	+13	41	
4	UDI '19	26	9	10	7	51	42	+9	37	
5	De Valk	26	10	7	9	43	47	−4	37	
6	Venray	26	10	6	10	53	40	+13	36	
7	OJC Rosmalen	26	11	3	12	46	59	−13	36	Promotion playoff
8	DESK	26	11	3	12	37	52	−15	36	
9	Meerssen	26	10	5	11	43	44	−1	35	
10	Blauw Geel '38	26	10	5	11	42	43	−1	35	Promotion playoff
11	Juliana '31	26	10	4	12	47	44	+3	34	Relegation playoffs
12	Deurne	26	9	6	11	37	45	−8	33	Relegation playoffs
13	Papendrecht	26	8	8	10	25	33	−8	32	Relegated to the Eerste Klasse
14	Schijndel	26	3	8	15	32	55	−23	17	Relegated to the Eerste Klasse

=== Sunday C ===
Pos	Team	Pld	W	D	L	GF	GA	GD	Pts	Promotion or relegation
1	HSC '21	26	19	1	6	62	28	+34	58	Promoted to Topklasse
2	Be Quick 1887	26	17	4	5	52	24	+28	55	Promotion playoff
3	WKE	26	16	4	6	48	32	+16	51 (Note: 1 point deducted?)	Promotion playoff
4	Alcides	26	14	6	6	41	24	+17	48	Promotion playoff
5	SC NEC	26	14	3	9	50	42	+8	45	
6	Rohda Raalte	26	12	5	9	37	24	+13	41	
7	Babberich	26	10	7	9	43	41	+2	37	
8	RKHVV	26	10	3	13	46	45	+1	33	
9	MSC	26	9	4	13	45	52	−7	31	
10	Hoogeveen	26	8	7	11	45	58	−13	31	
11	Sneek Wit Zwart	26	8	6	12	45	44	+1	30	Relegation playoffs
12	Rigtersbleek	26	8	6	12	43	47	−4	30	Relegation playoffs
13	FVC	26	5	3	18	33	67	−34	18	Relegated to the Eerste Klasse
14	Rheden	26	1	3	22	22	84	−62	6	Relegated to the Eerste Klasse

== Promotion playoffs ==
=== Round 1 ===
==== Saturday A ====
Pos	Team	Pld	W	D	L	GF	GA	GD	Pts
1	Young Boys	2	2	0	0	5	2	+3	6
2	Quick Boys	2	1	0	1	1	1	0	3
3	Scheveningen	2	0	0	2	2	5	−3	0

==== Saturday B ====
Pos	Team	Pld	W	D	L	GF	GA	GD	Pts
1	Montfoort	2	2	0	0	6	1	+5	6
2	XerxesDZB	2	1	0	1	5	5	0	3
3	Heerjansdam	2	0	0	2	2	7	−5	0

==== Saturday C ====
Pos	Team	Pld	W	D	L	GF	GA	GD	Pts
1	Staphorst	2	1	0	1	6	3	+3	3
2	WHC	2	1	0	1	2	3	−1	3
3	SDC Putten	2	1	0	1	3	5	−2	3

==== Sunday A ====
Pos	Team	Pld	W	D	L	GF	GA	GD	Pts
1	SC Feyenoord	2	2	0	0	7	0	+7	6
2	Chabab	2	1	0	1	3	6	−3	3
3	ADO '20	2	0	0	2	2	6	−4	0

==== Sunday B ====
Pos	Team	Pld	W	D	L	GF	GA	GD	Pts
1	Blauw Geel 38	2	2	0	0	5	1	+4	6
2	OJC Rosmalen	2	1	0	1	3	4	−1	3
3	EHC	2	0	0	2	2	5	−3	0

==== Sunday C ====
Pos	Team	Pld	W	D	L	GF	GA	GD	Pts
1	WKE	2	2	0	0	3	1	+2	6
2	Be Quick 1887	2	1	0	1	2	2	0	3
3	Alcides	2	0	0	2	2	4	−2	0

=== Round 2 ===
==== Saturday ====
Team 1	Agg.	Team 2	1st leg	2nd leg
Apeldoorn CSV	4–0	Staphorst	2–0	2–0
Montfoort	3–1	Young Boys	1–0	2–1

==== Sunday ====
Team 1	Agg.	Team 2	1st leg	2nd leg
Blauw Geel '38	1–3	Hilversum	1–1	0–2
SC Feyenoord	2–3	WKE	1–1	1–2 (aet)

=== Round 3 ===
==== Sunday ====
Team 1	Score	Team 2
Hilversum	0–3	WKE

==== Saturday ====
Team 1	Score	Team 2
Montfoort	1–0 (aet)	Apeldoorn CSV

- WKE and Montfoort will play in 2011–12 Topklasse.

== Promotion/relegation play-off Hoofdklasse – Eerste Klasse ==
=== Saturday ===
The teams ranked 11th and 12th of each of the 3 Saturday leagues (6 teams) and the 3 period winners of each of the 5 Saturday Eerste Klasse leagues (15 teams), making a total of 21 teams are grouped in 7 groups of 3 teams in such a way that the Hoofdklasse teams each end up in a different group. In each group the 3 teams play a mini-competition.
The 7 group winners will play next season in the 2011–12 Hoofdklasse and the remaining teams in the 2011–12 Eerste klasse.

==== Group 1 ====
Pos	Team	Pld	W	D	L	GF	GA	GD	Pts	Hoofdklasse or Eerste Klasse
1	Zwaluwen '30 (Note: Final match of the group between Zwaluwen '30 and 's-Gravenzande was cancelled since the outcome was no longer relevant. Zwaluwen '30 would be group winner no matter what.) (O)	3	3	0	0	7	3	+4	9	To 2011–12 Hoofdklasse Saturday
2	VVA '71	4	2	0	2	6	6	0	6	To 2011–12 Eerste Klasse Saturday
3	's-Gravenzande	3	0	0	3	2	6	−4	0	To 2011–12 Eerste Klasse Saturday

(O) Play-off winners

==== Group 2 ====
Pos	Team	Pld	W	D	L	GF	GA	GD	Pts	Hoofdklasse or Eerste Klasse
1	Huizen (O)	4	4	0	0	12	3	+9	12	To 2011–12 Hoofdklasse Saturday
2	VVZ '49	4	1	1	2	5	9	−4	4	To 2011–12 Eerste Klasse Saturday
3	Deltasport	4	0	1	3	5	10	−5	1	To 2011–12 Eerste Klasse Saturday

(O) Play-off winners

==== Groep 3 ====
Pos	Team	Pld	W	D	L	GF	GA	GD	Pts	Hoofdklasse or Eerste Klasse
1	LRC (O)	4	3	1	0	12	2	+10	10	To 2011–12 Hoofdklasse Saturday
2	Alblasserdam	4	2	0	2	5	7	−2	6	To 2011–12 Eerste Klasse Saturday
3	HBOK	4	0	1	3	2	10	−8	1	To 2011–12 Eerste Klasse Saturday

(O) Play-off winners

==== Groep 4 ====
Pos	Team	Pld	W	D	L	GF	GA	GD	Pts	Hoofdklasse or Eerste Klasse
1	Nivo Sparta (Note: Final match of the group between NSC and Nivo Sparta was cancelled since the outcome was no longer relevant. Nivo Sparta would be group winner no matter what.) (O)	3	2	1	0	7	2	+5	7	To 2011–12 Hoofdklasse Saturday
2	DSO	4	0	3	1	7	9	−2	3	To 2011–12 Eerste Klasse Saturday
3	NSC	3	0	2	1	5	8	−3	2	To 2011–12 Eerste Klasse Saturday

(O) Play-off winners

==== Group 5 ====
Pos	Team	Pld	W	D	L	GF	GA	GD	Pts	Hoofdklasse or Eerste Klasse
1	VVOG (Note: Final match of the group between VVOG and Holwierde was cancelled since the outcome was no longer relevant. VVOG would be group winner no matter what.) (O)	3	2	1	0	9	4	+5	7	To 2011–12 Hoofdklasse Saturday
2	Oranje Wit	4	2	0	2	5	6	−1	6	To 2011–12 Eerste Klasse Saturday
3	Holwierde	3	0	1	2	3	7	−4	1	To 2011–12 Eerste Klasse Saturday

(O) Play-off winners

==== Group 6 ====
Pos	Team	Pld	W	D	L	GF	GA	GD	Pts	Hoofdklasse or Eerste Klasse
1	DVS '33 (O)	4	4	0	0	13	3	+10	12	To 2011–12 Hoofdklasse Saturday
2	Olde Veste '54	4	1	1	2	6	9	−3	4	To 2011–12 Eerste Klasse Saturday
3	DZC '68	4	0	1	3	4	11	−7	1	To 2011–12 Eerste Klasse Saturday

(O) Play-off winners

==== Group 7 ====
Pos	Team	Pld	W	D	L	GF	GA	GD	Pts	Hoofdklasse or Eerste Klasse
1	Barneveld (O)	4	2	2	0	9	1	+8	8	To 2011–12 Hoofdklasse Saturday
2	Oranje Nassau	4	2	2	0	8	2	+6	8	To 2011–12 Eerste Klasse Saturday
3	Drenthina	4	0	0	4	1	15	−14	0	To 2011–12 Eerste Klasse Saturday

(O) Play-off winners

=== Sunday ===
The teams ranked 11th and 12th of each of the 3 Sunday leagues (6 teams) and the 3 period winners of each of the 6 Sunday Eerste Klasse leagues (18 teams), making a total of 24 teams, play in a 2-round 2 leg knockout system in such a way that the Hoofdklasse teams can never meet each other.
The 6 winners of the second round matches will play next season in the 2011–12 Hoofdklasse and the remaining teams in the 2011–12 Eerste klasse.

First round
1	Alphense Boys	6	1	7
4	EDO	2	2	4
3	Stormvogels	1	1	2
2	Excelsior '20	1	2	3

Final round
Alphense Boys	3	2	5
Excelsior '20	0	1	1

First round
1	Westlandia	3	3	6
4	Blauw-Wit	1	1	2
3	Purmersteijn	2	5	7
2	SJC	2	2	4

Final round
Westlandia	2	4	6
Purmersteijn	0	2	2

First round
1	Juliana '31	4	1	5
4	Vlissingen	0	2	2
3	Brabantia	0	1	1
2	Bekkerveld	2	5	7

Final round
Juliana '31 ^{(Penalties)}	1	1	2 (8)
Bekkerveld	1	1	2 (7)

First round
1	Deurne	5	0	5
4	HVCH	3	1	4
3	JEKA	0	3	3
2	OSS '20	0	2	2

Final round
Deurne	1	2	3
JEKA	1	0	1

First round
1	Sneek Wit Zwart	5	2	7
4	Germania	1	1	2
3	Achilles '12	3	4	7
2	Dalen	2	3	5

Final round
Sneek Wit Zwart	2	3	5
Achilles '12	0	2	2

First round
1	Rigtersbleek	2	1	3
4	GVAV-Rapiditas	0	1	1
3	De Bataven	1	2	3
2	Achilles 1894	1	4	5

Final round
Rigtersbleek	2	1	3
Achilles 1894	2	0	2
