= 2008–09 Hoofdklasse =

Hoofdklasse
- Season: 2008–09

The 2008–09 season of the Hoofdklasse was competed in six leagues: three Saturday leagues, and three Sunday leagues.

== Saturday A ==
| Pos | Team | Pld | W | D | L | GF | GA | GD | Pts | Qualification or relegation |
|---|---|---|---|---|---|---|---|---|---|---|
| 1 | Rijnsburgse Boys | 26 | 20 | 5 | 1 | 63 | 22 | +41 | 65 | Team wins the league |
| 2 | Capelle | 26 | 15 | 6 | 5 | 54 | 32 | +22 | 51 | |
| 3 | Barendrecht | 26 | 15 | 4 | 7 | 50 | 24 | +26 | 49 | |
| 4 | ASWH | 26 | 13 | 8 | 5 | 48 | 34 | +14 | 47 | |
| 5 | Ter Leede | 26 | 13 | 3 | 10 | 52 | 45 | +7 | 42 | |
| 6 | Quick Boys | 26 | 13 | 2 | 11 | 56 | 47 | +9 | 41 | |
| 7 | Katwijk | 26 | 12 | 5 | 9 | 39 | 33 | +6 | 41 | |
| 8 | Lisse | 26 | 11 | 4 | 11 | 48 | 51 | −3 | 37 | |
| 9 | Noordwijk | 26 | 8 | 4 | 14 | 42 | 49 | −7 | 28 | |
| 10 | Scheveningen | 26 | 8 | 4 | 14 | 36 | 54 | −18 | 28 | |
| 11 | DOTO | 26 | 8 | 2 | 16 | 25 | 54 | −29 | 26 | |
| 12 | Excelsior Maassluis | 26 | 7 | 3 | 16 | 31 | 48 | −17 | 24 | Relegation playoffs |
| 13 | ARC | 26 | 7 | 3 | 16 | 27 | 47 | −20 | 24 | Relegation playoffs |
| 14 | Heerjansdam | 26 | 4 | 3 | 19 | 27 | 58 | −31 | 15 | Relegated to the Eerste Klasse |

== Saturday B ==
| Pos | Team | Pld | W | D | L | GF | GA | GD | Pts | Relegation |
|---|---|---|---|---|---|---|---|---|---|---|
| 1 | IJsselmeervogels | 26 | 15 | 9 | 2 | 59 | 22 | +37 | 54 | Team wins the league |
| 2 | Hoek | 26 | 12 | 8 | 6 | 47 | 31 | +16 | 44 | |
| 3 | Bennekom | 26 | 12 | 5 | 9 | 37 | 34 | +3 | 41 | |
| 4 | GVVV | 26 | 12 | 5 | 9 | 45 | 37 | +8 | 40 (Note: 1 point deducted?) | |
| 5 | Spakenburg | 26 | 12 | 6 | 8 | 52 | 39 | +13 | 38 (Note: 4 points deducted?) | |
| 6 | SDC Putten | 26 | 12 | 2 | 12 | 36 | 40 | −4 | 38 | |
| 7 | Sparta Nijkerk | 26 | 10 | 7 | 9 | 40 | 44 | −4 | 37 | |
| 8 | RKAV Volendam | 26 | 10 | 6 | 10 | 44 | 40 | +4 | 36 | |
| 9 | Jodan Boys | 26 | 8 | 10 | 8 | 47 | 36 | +11 | 34 | |
| 10 | Zwaluwen '30 | 26 | 9 | 6 | 11 | 45 | 43 | +2 | 33 | |
| 11 | Kozakken Boys | 26 | 7 | 10 | 9 | 39 | 40 | −1 | 31 | |
| 12 | DOVO | 26 | 8 | 7 | 11 | 33 | 48 | −15 | 31 | |
| 13 | Ajax (amateurs) | 26 | 4 | 10 | 12 | 22 | 46 | −24 | 22 | Relegated to the Eerste Klasse |
| 14 | Geinoord | 26 | 4 | 3 | 19 | 35 | 81 | −46 | 15 | Relegated to the Eerste Klasse |

== Saturday C ==
| Pos | Team | Pld | W | D | L | GF | GA | GD | Pts | Qualification or relegation |
|---|---|---|---|---|---|---|---|---|---|---|
| 1 | Harkemase Boys | 26 | 18 | 3 | 5 | 52 | 24 | +28 | 57 | Team wins the league |
| 2 | HHC Hardenberg | 26 | 14 | 4 | 8 | 44 | 31 | +13 | 46 | |
| 3 | Nunspeet | 26 | 12 | 8 | 6 | 49 | 31 | +18 | 44 | |
| 4 | Berkum | 26 | 12 | 6 | 8 | 54 | 41 | +13 | 42 | |
| 5 | WHC | 26 | 11 | 7 | 8 | 34 | 27 | +7 | 40 | |
| 6 | Flevo Boys | 26 | 12 | 2 | 12 | 52 | 62 | −10 | 38 | |
| 7 | Be Quick '28 | 26 | 10 | 7 | 9 | 43 | 31 | +12 | 37 | |
| 8 | Genemuiden | 26 | 9 | 7 | 10 | 38 | 31 | +7 | 34 | |
| 9 | Go Ahead Kampen | 26 | 10 | 5 | 11 | 44 | 42 | +2 | 34 (Note: 1 point deducted?) | |
| 10 | Excelsior '31 | 26 | 8 | 7 | 11 | 42 | 43 | −1 | 30 (Note: 1 point deducted?) | |
| 11 | Staphorst | 26 | 9 | 2 | 15 | 44 | 63 | −19 | 29 | Relegation playoffs |
| 12 | PKC '83 | 26 | 8 | 5 | 13 | 39 | 58 | −19 | 29 | Relegation playoffs |
| 13 | ONS Sneek | 26 | 7 | 7 | 12 | 26 | 46 | −20 | 28 | Relegated to the Eerste Klasse |
| 14 | Oranje Nassau | 26 | 6 | 2 | 18 | 34 | 65 | −31 | 20 | Relegated to the Eerste Klasse |

== Sunday A ==
| Pos | Team | Pld | W | D | L | GF | GA | GD | Pts | Relegation |
|---|---|---|---|---|---|---|---|---|---|---|
| 1 | Westlandia | 24 | 15 | 3 | 6 | 42 | 24 | +18 | 48 | Team wins the league |
| 2 | Hilversum | 24 | 14 | 4 | 6 | 43 | 32 | +11 | 46 | |
| 3 | Haaglandia | 24 | 11 | 8 | 5 | 47 | 40 | +7 | 41 | |
| 4 | Argon | 24 | 12 | 4 | 8 | 42 | 28 | +14 | 40 | |
| 5 | AFC | 24 | 11 | 7 | 6 | 45 | 34 | +11 | 40 | |
| 6 | VVSB | 24 | 11 | 3 | 10 | 37 | 30 | +7 | 36 | |
| 7 | Hollandia | 24 | 10 | 6 | 8 | 36 | 33 | +3 | 36 | |
| 8 | ADO '20 | 24 | 8 | 7 | 9 | 35 | 34 | +1 | 31 | |
| 9 | Omniworld (amateurs) | 24 | 8 | 4 | 12 | 40 | 38 | +2 | 28 | |
| 10 | HBS Craeyenhout | 24 | 7 | 7 | 10 | 28 | 46 | −18 | 28 | |
| 11 | Elinkwijk | 24 | 7 | 6 | 11 | 33 | 42 | −9 | 27 | |
| 12 | VUC | 24 | 6 | 4 | 14 | 26 | 40 | −14 | 22 | |
| 13 | DWV | 24 | 2 | 5 | 17 | 13 | 46 | −33 | 11 | Relegated to the Eerste Klasse |
| 14 | Türkiyemspor | 0 | 0 | 0 | 0 | 0 | 0 | 0 | 0 | Relegated to the Eerste Klasse |

== Sunday B ==
| Pos | Team | Pld | W | D | L | GF | GA | GD | Pts | Qualification |
|---|---|---|---|---|---|---|---|---|---|---|
| 1 | Baronie | 26 | 16 | 5 | 5 | 47 | 28 | +19 | 53 | Team wins the league |
| 2 | Gemert | 26 | 15 | 7 | 4 | 50 | 20 | +30 | 52 | |
| 3 | EVV | 26 | 13 | 9 | 4 | 39 | 25 | +14 | 48 | |
| 4 | UNA | 26 | 12 | 4 | 10 | 45 | 37 | +8 | 40 | |
| 5 | Dijkse Boys | 26 | 11 | 7 | 8 | 39 | 31 | +8 | 40 | |
| 6 | DESK | 26 | 11 | 3 | 12 | 39 | 52 | −13 | 36 | |
| 7 | Venray | 26 | 10 | 5 | 11 | 55 | 47 | +8 | 35 | |
| 8 | Meerssen | 26 | 10 | 5 | 11 | 40 | 46 | −6 | 35 | |
| 9 | Papendrecht | 26 | 10 | 4 | 12 | 30 | 38 | −8 | 34 | |
| 10 | JVC Cuijk | 26 | 9 | 6 | 11 | 41 | 39 | +2 | 33 | |
| 11 | Schijndel | 26 | 8 | 7 | 11 | 29 | 31 | −2 | 31 | |
| 12 | OJC Rosmalen | 26 | 4 | 13 | 9 | 29 | 34 | −5 | 25 | |
| 13 | Deurne | 26 | 7 | 9 | 10 | 30 | 33 | −3 | 24 (Note: 6 points deducted?) | Relegated to the Eerste Klasse |
| 14 | LONGA | 26 | 2 | 4 | 20 | 25 | 77 | −52 | 10 | Relegated to the Eerste Klasse |

== Sunday C ==
| Pos | Team | Pld | W | D | L | GF | GA | GD | Pts | Relegation |
|---|---|---|---|---|---|---|---|---|---|---|
| 1 | WKE | 26 | 15 | 9 | 2 | 56 | 22 | +34 | 54 | Team wins the league |
| 2 | Achilles '29 | 26 | 15 | 5 | 6 | 51 | 27 | +24 | 50 | |
| 3 | De Treffers | 26 | 14 | 8 | 4 | 46 | 24 | +22 | 50 | |
| 4 | Quick '20 | 26 | 14 | 7 | 5 | 49 | 37 | +12 | 49 | |
| 5 | HSC '21 | 26 | 14 | 5 | 7 | 56 | 34 | +22 | 47 | |
| 6 | Lienden | 26 | 13 | 7 | 6 | 55 | 37 | +18 | 46 | |
| 7 | Be Quick 1887 | 26 | 7 | 10 | 9 | 32 | 37 | −5 | 31 | |
| 8 | Joure | 26 | 10 | 0 | 16 | 35 | 48 | −13 | 30 | |
| 9 | Sneek Wit Zwart | 26 | 6 | 9 | 11 | 27 | 39 | −12 | 27 | |
| 10 | Babberich | 26 | 9 | 0 | 17 | 37 | 50 | −13 | 27 | |
| 11 | Alcides | 26 | 7 | 5 | 14 | 32 | 58 | −26 | 26 | |
| 12 | Germania | 26 | 6 | 7 | 13 | 23 | 38 | −15 | 25 | |
| 13 | WSV | 26 | 5 | 9 | 12 | 38 | 57 | −19 | 24 | Relegated to the Eerste Klasse |
| 14 | De Bataven | 26 | 3 | 7 | 16 | 22 | 51 | −29 | 16 | Relegated to the Eerste Klasse |

== Championship ==
=== Saturday championship ===
| Pos | Team | Pld | W | D | L | GF | GA | GD | Pts |
|---|---|---|---|---|---|---|---|---|---|
| 1 | Rijnsburgse Boys | 4 | 3 | 1 | 0 | 5 | 2 | +3 | 10 |
| 2 | IJsselmeervogels | 4 | 1 | 1 | 2 | 6 | 9 | −3 | 4 |
| 3 | Harkemase Boys | 4 | 1 | 0 | 3 | 6 | 6 | 0 | 3 |

=== Sunday championship ===
| Pos | Team | Pld | W | D | L | GF | GA | GD | Pts |
|---|---|---|---|---|---|---|---|---|---|
| 1 | WKE | 4 | 2 | 1 | 1 | 7 | 4 | +3 | 7 |
| 2 | Westlandia | 4 | 1 | 2 | 1 | 3 | 7 | −4 | 5 |
| 3 | Baronie | 4 | 1 | 1 | 2 | 6 | 5 | +1 | 4 |

=== Final ===
| Team 1 | Agg. | Team 2 | 1st leg | 2nd leg |
|---|---|---|---|---|
| Rijnsburgse Boys | 4 – 4 (1-2 p.) | WKE | 1–0 | 3–4 |
