= 2009–10 Hoofdklasse =

Hoofdklasse
- Season: 2009–10

The 2009–10 season of the Hoofdklasse was competed in six leagues, three Saturday leagues and three Sunday leagues. The Champions, second, third and fourth of each group promoted direct to the new Topklasse.

== Saturday A ==
Pos	Team	Pld	W	D	L	GF	GA	GD	Pts	Promotion or relegation
1	Barendrecht	26	18	7	1	66	21	+45	61	Promoted to Topklasse
2	Capelle	26	17	3	6	57	34	+23	54	Promoted to Topklasse
3	Rijnsburgse Boys	26	14	7	5	48	25	+23	49	Promoted to Topklasse
4	Lisse	26	11	8	7	49	36	+13	41	Promoted to Topklasse
5	Katwijk	26	11	6	9	45	43	+2	39	Promotion playoff
6	ARC	26	11	6	9	41	43	−2	39	Promotion playoff
7	Noordwijk	26	10	8	8	45	37	+8	38	
8	ASWH	26	10	8	8	47	43	+4	36 (Note: 2 points deducted?)	
9	Ter Leede	26	9	7	10	50	46	+4	34	
10	Scheveningen	26	8	7	11	44	52	−8	31	
11	RVVH	26	9	3	14	31	45	−14	30	
12	Quick Boys	26	9	3	14	39	48	−9	29 (Note: 1 point deducted?)	
13	DOTO	26	4	3	19	21	66	−45	15	Relegation playoffs
14	TOGR	26	2	2	22	24	68	−44	8	Relegated to the Eerste Klasse

== Saturday B ==
Pos	Team	Pld	W	D	L	GF	GA	GD	Pts	Promotion or relegation
1	IJsselmeervogels	26	19	3	4	64	18	+46	60	Promoted to Topklasse
2	Sparta Nijkerk	26	18	4	4	69	35	+34	58	Promoted to Topklasse
3	Spakenburg	26	14	8	4	62	36	+26	50	Promoted to Topklasse
4	Hoek	26	12	9	5	38	29	+9	45	Promoted to Topklasse
5	Zwaluwen '30	26	12	2	12	50	49	+1	38	Promotion playoff
6	GVVV	26	10	7	9	46	43	+3	37	Promotion playoff
7	SDC Putten	26	9	8	9	43	45	−2	35	
8	Kozakken Boys	26	8	9	9	46	47	−1	33	
9	ODIN '59	26	8	7	11	46	51	−5	31	
10	Jodan Boys	26	8	7	11	40	54	−14	31	
11	LRC Leerdam	26	8	6	12	43	51	−8	30	
12	RKAV Volendam	26	7	5	14	45	60	−15	26	
13	DOVO	26	6	2	18	33	66	−33	20	Relegation playoffs
14	Bennekom	26	4	1	21	32	73	−41	13	Relegated to the Eerste Klasse

== Saturday C ==
Pos	Team	Pld	W	D	L	GF	GA	GD	Pts	Promotion or relegation
1	Excelsior '31	26	17	3	6	46	25	+21	54	Promoted to Topklasse
2	Harkemase Boys	26	15	6	5	66	31	+35	51	Promoted to Topklasse
3	CSV Apeldoorn	26	13	7	6	46	35	+11	46	Promoted to Topklasse
4	Flevo Boys	26	13	3	10	42	36	+6	42	Promoted to Topklasse
5	Genemuiden	26	10	8	8	45	37	+8	38	Promotion playoff
6	HHC Hardenberg	26	9	8	9	31	29	+2	35	Promotion playoff
7	WHC	26	9	8	9	45	48	−3	35	
8	ACV	26	9	8	9	34	39	−5	35	
9	PKC '83	26	11	0	15	50	52	−2	33	
10	Berkum	26	9	4	13	44	46	−2	31	
11	Staphorst	26	7	10	9	30	34	−4	31	
12	Nunspeet	26	8	6	12	36	53	−17	30	
13	Be Quick '28	26	7	8	11	39	47	−8	29	Relegation playoffs
14	Go Ahead Kampen	26	4	3	19	30	72	−42	15	Relegated to the Eerste Klasse

== Sunday A ==
Pos	Team	Pld	W	D	L	GF	GA	GD	Pts	Promotion or relegation
1	AFC	26	18	3	5	64	29	+35	57	Promoted to Topklasse
2	Argon	26	14	6	6	42	28	+14	48	Promoted to Topklasse
3	Hilversum	26	14	4	8	42	34	+8	46	Promoted to Topklasse
4	Haaglandia	26	13	5	8	43	37	+6	44	Promoted to Topklasse
5	VVSB	26	11	5	10	37	32	+5	38	Promotion playoff
6	Hollandia	26	9	9	8	39	41	−2	36	Promotion playoff
7	HBS Craeyenhout	26	10	6	10	36	39	−3	36	
8	ADO '20	26	9	8	9	33	30	+3	35	
9	Elinkwijk	26	8	7	11	40	39	+1	31	
10	Chabab	26	7	9	10	32	32	0	30	
11	SC Feyenoord	26	8	5	13	33	45	−12	29	
12	Westlandia	26	7	7	12	34	43	−9	28	
13	TONEGIDO	26	7	6	13	38	59	−21	27	Relegation playoffs
14	Omniworld (amateurs)	26	6	2	18	24	49	−25	20	Relegated to the Eerste Klasse

== Sunday B ==
Pos	Team	Pld	W	D	L	GF	GA	GD	Pts	Promotion or relegation
1	Gemert	26	17	3	6	48	27	+21	54	Promoted to Topklasse
2	Baronie	26	15	7	4	42	19	+23	52	Promoted to Topklasse
3	EVV	26	13	7	6	43	33	+10	46	Promoted to Topklasse
4	JVC Cuijk	26	12	9	5	53	36	+17	45	Promoted to Topklasse
5	Dijkse Boys	26	12	7	7	53	40	+13	43	Promotion playoff
6	Venray	26	12	5	9	59	40	+19	41	Promotion playoff
7	UNA	26	10	7	9	45	38	+7	37	
8	Meerssen	26	9	4	13	38	51	−13	31	
9	UDI '19	26	9	3	14	37	44	−7	30	
10	OJC Rosmalen	26	9	3	14	34	44	−10	30	
11	Papendrecht	26	8	6	12	40	59	−19	30	
12	Schijndel	26	7	7	12	35	40	−5	28	
13	DESK	26	6	8	12	33	61	−28	26	Relegation playoffs
14	OSS '20	26	3	4	19	27	55	−28	13	Relegated to the Eerste Klasse

== Sunday C ==
Pos	Team	Pld	W	D	L	GF	GA	GD	Pts	Promotion or relegation
1	De Treffers	26	15	10	1	55	15	+40	55	Promoted to Topklasse
2	Lienden	26	15	7	4	48	24	+24	52	Promoted to Topklasse
3	Quick '20	26	14	6	6	55	26	+29	48	Promoted to Topklasse
4	Achilles '29	26	15	3	8	53	34	+19	48	Promoted to Topklasse
5	WKE	26	12	6	8	43	33	+10	42	Promotion playoff
6	Be Quick 1887	26	12	5	9	52	34	+18	41	Promotion playoff
7	Juliana '31	26	12	3	11	50	40	+10	39	
8	ROHDA Raalte	26	9	9	8	35	40	−5	36	
9	HSC '21	26	9	8	9	40	30	+10	35	
10	Alcides	26	9	5	12	33	45	−12	32	
11	Sneek Wit Zwart	26	6	10	10	32	48	−16	28	
12	Babberich	26	4	8	14	33	53	−20	20	
13	Nieuw Buinen	26	3	9	14	33	66	−33	18	Relegation playoffs
14	Joure	26	1	3	22	14	88	−74	6	Relegated to the Eerste Klasse

== Championship ==
=== Saturday championship ===
Pos	Team	Pld	W	D	L	GF	GA	GD	Pts
1	IJsselmeervogels	4	3	1	0	7	1	+6	10
2	Barendrecht	4	1	2	1	4	6	−2	5
3	Excelsior '31	4	1	0	3	3	7	−4	3

=== Sunday championship ===
Pos	Team	Pld	W	D	L	GF	GA	GD	Pts
1	Gemert	4	2	2	0	6	3	+3	8
2	De Treffers	4	1	2	1	8	7	+1	5
3	AFC	4	0	2	2	2	6	−4	2

=== Final ===
Team 1	Agg.	Team 2	1st leg	2nd leg
Gemert	0 – 5	IJsselmeervogels	0–1	0–4

== Topklasse Playoffs ==
=== Round 1 ===
==== For promotion to Topklasse Saturday ====
Team 1	Agg.	Team 2	1st leg	2nd leg
GVVV	0–2	Katwijk	0–1	0–1
Zwaluwen '30	2–6	HHC Hardenberg	1–5	1–1
Genemuiden	3–1	ARC	0–1	3–0

==== For promotion to Topklasse Sunday ====
Team 1	Agg.	Team 2	1st leg	2nd leg
WKE	1–2	Hollandia	1–1	0–1
Dijkse Boys	2–1	Be Quick 1887	0–0	2–1
VVSB	2–1	Venray	2–0	0–1

=== Round 2 ===
==== Group 1 ====
Pos	Team	Pld	W	D	L	GF	GA	GD	Pts
1	ARC	2	2	0	0	6	2	+4	6
2	GVVV	2	1	0	1	7	4	+3	3
3	Zwaluwen '30	2	0	0	2	2	9	−7	0

==== Group 2 ====
Pos	Team	Pld	W	D	L	GF	GA	GD	Pts
1	Be Quick 1887	2	1	1	0	6	2	+4	4
2	Venray	2	1	1	0	4	1	+3	4
3	WKE	2	0	0	2	1	8	−7	0

=== Round 3 ===
Team 1	Score	Team 2
ARC	1–1; 4–2 (pen)	Be Quick 1887
