= 2011–12 Hoofdklasse =

Hoofdklasse
- Season: 2011–12
- Champions: Sat A: Jodan Boys; Sat B: Scheveningen; Sat C: DETO; Sun A: ADO '20; Sun B: Gemert; Sun C: Sneek Wit Zwart
- Promoted: Sat A: Jodan Boys; Sat B: Scheveningen, Kozakken Boys; Sat C: DETO; Sun A: ADO '20, Chabab; Sun B: Gemert; Sun C: Sneek Wit Zwart
- Relegated: Sat A: Voorschoten '97, Zwaluwen '30, SDC Putten, Young Boys; Sat B: LRC Leerdam, Heerjansdam; Sat C: Urk, Oranje Nassau Groningen, Drachtster Boys; Sun A: Purmersteijn, AFC '34; Sun B: Meerssen, De Valk, Dijkse Boys, DESK; Sun C: Babberich, DIO Groningen

The 2011–12 season of the Hoofdklasse is competed in six leagues, three Saturday leagues and three Sunday leagues. The champions of each group promoted direct to the 2012–13 Topklasse.

== Teams ==
=== Saturday A ===
Location of teams in the Saturday A

Club	Home City	Venue	Capacity
Bennekom	Bennekom	Eikelhof	
DOVO	Veenendaal	Panhuis	
Huizen	Huizen	De Wolfskamer	5,000
Jodan Boys	Gouda	Oosterwei	
ODIN '59	Heemskerk	Assumburg	
Quick Boys	Katwijk aan Zee	Nieuw-Zuid	7,500
RKAV Volendam	Volendam	Gem. Sportpark	
SDC Putten	Putten	Putter Eng	4,000
Sparta Nijkerk	Nijkerk	De Ebbenhorst	5,300
Sportlust '46	Woerden	Cromwijck	1,400
Ter Leede	Sassenheim	De Roodemolen	3,000
Voorschoten '97	Voorschoten	Adegeest	
Young Boys	Haarlem	Noord Schalkwijkerweg	1,000
Zwaluwen '30	Hoorn	Middelweg	

=== Saturday B ===
Location of teams in the Saturday B

Club	Location	Venue	Capacity
ASWH	Hendrik-Ido-Ambacht	Sportpark Schildman	3.000
Achilles Veen	Veen	De Heuye	
Excelsior Maassluis	Maassluis	Lavendelstraat	5.000
Heerjansdam	Heerjansdam	De Molenwei	
Hoek	Hoek	Denoek	2.500
Kloetinge	Kloetinge	Wesselopark	1.500
Kozakken Boys	Werkendam	De Zwaaier	2.500
LRC	Leerdam	Bruinsdeel	
Nieuw-Lekkerland	Nieuw Lekkerland	Excelsior	
Nivo Sparta	Zaltbommel	Eurosportpark	
RVVH	Ridderkerk	Ridderkerk	3.000
Scheveningen	Scheveningen, The Hague	Houtrust	3.500
XerxesDZB	Rotterdam	Sportpark Faas Wilkes	3.500
Zwaluwen	Vlaardingen	Zwaluwen	

=== Saturday C ===
Location of teams in the Saturday C

Club	Location	Venue	Capacity
ACV	Assen	Univé Sportpark	5.000
CSV Apeldoorn	Apeldoorn	Sportpark Orderbos	2.500
Berkum	Zwolle	De Vegtlust	3.000
DETO	Vriezenveen	Het Midden	
DVS '33	Ermelo	DVS '33	
Drachtster Boys	Drachten	Drachtster Bos	
Flevo Boys	Emmeloord	Sportpark Ervenbos	3.000
Nunspeet	Nunspeet	De Wiltsangh	6.000
ONS Sneek	Sneek	Zuidersportpark	
Oranje Nassau	Groningen	Coendersborg	
Staphorst	Staphorst	Het Noorderslag	2.500
Urk	Urk	De Vormt	
VVOG	Harderwijk	De Strokel	
WHC	Wezep	Mulderssingel	

=== Sunday A ===
Location of teams in the Sunday A

Club	Location	Venue	Capacity
ADO '20	Heemskerk	De Vlotter	
AFC '34	Alkmaar	Gemeentelijk Sportpark	
Alphense Boys	Alphen aan den Rijn	De Bijlen	
Chabab	Amsterdam	Sloten	
DHC	Delft	Brasserskade	
De Zouaven	Grootebroek	De Kloet	
Elinkwijk	Zuilen, Utrecht	Elinkwijk	
Koninklijke HFC	Haarlem	Kon. HFC	
Leonidas	Rotterdam	Leonidas	
Nieuwenhoorn	Nieuwenhoorn, Hellevoetsluis	Nieuwenhoorn	
VPV Purmersteijn	Purmerend	Purmersteijn	
RKAVV	Leidschendam	De Kastelenring	
SC Feyenoord	Rotterdam	Varkenoord	
Westlandia	Naaldwijk	Hoge Bomen	

=== Sunday B ===
Location of teams in the Sunday B

Club	Location	Venue	Capacity
Baronie	Breda	Sportpark De Blauwe Kei	7.000
Blauw Geel '38	Veghel	Prins Willem Alexander	
DESK	Kaatsheuvel	Eikendijk	
De Valk	Valkenswaard	Het Valkennest	
Deurne	Deurne	De Kranenmortel	
Dijkse Boys	Helmond	Sportpark Berckendonk	1.500
Dongen	Dongen	De Biezen	
EHC	Hoensbroek	De Dem	
Gemert	Gemert	Molenbroek	4.000
Groene Ster	Heerlen	Pronsebroek	
Meerssen	Meerssen	Marsana	
Nuenen	Nuenen	Oude Landen	
OJC Rosmalen	Rosmalen	De Groote Wielen	
Venray	Venray	De Wieën	

=== Sunday C ===
Location of teams in the Sunday C

Club	Location	Venue	Capacity
Alcides	Meppel	Ezinge	
Babberich	Babberich	De Buitenboom	
Be Quick 1887	Haren, Groningen	Esserberg	
DIO Groningen	Groningen	Kardinge	
Hoogeveen	Hoogeveen	Bentinckspark	
Juliana '31	Malden	De Broeklanden	
LONGA '30	Lichtenvoorde	De Treffer	
MSC	Meppel	Ezinge	
RKHVV	Huissen	De Blauwenburcht	
Rohda Raalte	Raalte	Tijenraan	
Rigtersbleek	Enschede	Bleekrondom	
SC NEC	Nijmegen	De Eendracht	
SWZ	Sneek	Sneek Wit Zwart	
UDI '19	Uden	Parkzicht	

== League tables ==
=== Saturday A ===
Pos	Team	Pld	W	D	L	GF	GA	GD	Pts	Qualification or relegation
1	Jodan Boys (Note: Winner of the Third Period (round 14-26 instead of round 18-26, due to bankruptcy of Young Boys).) (C, P)	24	15	4	5	41	23	+18	49	Promotion to 2012–13 Topklasse Saturday
2	Ter Leede (Note: Substitute winner of the Third Period.) (Q)	24	12	6	6	46	30	+16	42	Qualification for promotion/relegation play-offs Topklasse/Hoofdklasse Saturday
3	Quick Boys	24	13	2	9	41	34	+7	41	
4	Huizen (Note: Winner of the Second Period (round 9-17).) (Q)	24	12	3	9	38	37	+1	39	Qualification for promotion/relegation play-offs Topklasse/Hoofdklasse Saturday
5	Sparta Nijkerk	24	10	4	10	39	34	+5	34	
6	ODIN '59 (Note: Winner of the First Period (round 1-8).) (Q)	24	11	1	12	38	35	+3	34	Qualification for promotion/relegation play-offs Topklasse/Hoofdklasse Saturday
7	Bennekom	24	10	4	10	35	33	+2	34	
8	Volendam	24	11	1	12	39	49	−10	34	
9	DOVO	24	10	3	11	35	38	−3	33	
10	Sportlust '46	24	10	3	11	44	51	−7	33	
11	Voorschoten '97 (Q, R)	24	9	5	10	49	41	+8	32	Qualification promotion/relegation play-offs Hoofdklasse/Eerste Klasse
12	Zwaluwen '30 (Q, R)	24	7	3	14	32	45	−13	24	Qualification promotion/relegation play-offs Hoofdklasse/Eerste Klasse
13	SDC Putten (R)	24	5	3	16	30	57	−27	18	Relegation to 2012–13 Eerste Klasse
14	Young Boys (Note: On March 23, 2012 Young Boys indicated to be bankrupt after failing to raise Euro 50,000.00.) (R)	19	4	5	10	22	36	−14	17	Taken out of competition, all matches declared void

(C) Champions; (P) Promoted; (Q) Qualified for the phase indicated; (R) Relegated

=== Saturday B ===
Pos	Team	Pld	W	D	L	GF	GA	GD	Pts	Qualification or relegation
1	Scheveningen (Note: Winner of the Third Period (round 18-26).) (C, P)	26	19	3	4	59	30	+29	60	Promotion to 2012–13 Topklasse Saturday
2	Kozakken Boys (Note: Substitute winner of the Third Period.) (Q, O, P)	26	19	2	5	64	33	+31	59	Qualification for promotion/relegation play-offs Topklasse/Hoofdklasse Saturday
3	ASWH (Note: Winner of the Second Period (round 9-17).) (Q)	26	17	7	2	83	35	+48	58	Qualification for promotion/relegation play-offs Topklasse/Hoofdklasse Saturday
4	RVVH (Note: Winner of the First Period (round 1-8).) (Q)	26	16	3	7	53	37	+16	51	Qualification for promotion/relegation play-offs Topklasse/Hoofdklasse Saturday
5	Excelsior Maassluis	26	13	7	6	47	33	+14	46	
6	Hoek	26	14	4	8	39	30	+9	46	
7	XerxesDZB	26	14	3	9	74	38	+36	45	
8	Kloetinge	26	9	4	13	36	54	−18	31	
9	Zwaluwen	26	9	3	14	56	56	0	30	
10	Nivo Sparta	26	6	6	14	40	67	−27	24	
11	Achilles Veen (Q, O)	26	7	2	17	42	61	−19	23	Qualification promotion/relegation play-offs Hoofdklasse/Eerste Klasse
12	Nieuw-Lekkerland (Q, O)	26	7	2	17	34	56	−22	23	Qualification promotion/relegation play-offs Hoofdklasse/Eerste Klasse
13	LRC (R)	26	5	1	20	23	79	−56	16	Relegation to 2012–13 Eerste Klasse
14	Heerjansdam (R)	26	2	3	21	38	79	−41	9	Relegation to 2012–13 Eerste Klasse

(C) Champions; (O) Play-off winners; (P) Promoted; (Q) Qualified for the phase indicated; (R) Relegated

=== Saturday C ===
Pos	Team	Pld	W	D	L	GF	GA	GD	Pts	Qualification or relegation
1	WHC (Note: Winner of the First Period (round 1-8).) (Q)	26	14	7	5	59	31	+28	49	Qualification for promotion/relegation play-offs Topklasse/Hoofdklasse Saturday
2	DETO (Note: Substitute winner of the First Period.) (C, P)	26	14	7	5	42	34	+8	49	Promotion to 2012–13 Topklasse Saturday
3	CSV Apeldoorn	26	13	9	4	52	32	+20	48	
4	ONS Sneek	26	13	4	9	51	31	+20	43	
5	ACV (Note: Winner of the Second Period (round 9-17).) (Q)	26	11	10	5	37	23	+14	43	Qualification for promotion/relegation play-offs Topklasse/Hoofdklasse Saturday
6	DVS '33	26	11	7	8	52	46	+6	40	
7	Flevo Boys	26	9	9	8	55	42	+13	36	
8	Berkum (Note: Winner of the Third Period (round 18-26).) (Q)	26	10	6	10	35	37	−2	36	Qualification for promotion/relegation play-offs Topklasse/Hoofdklasse Saturday
9	Nunspeet	26	10	5	11	40	52	−12	35	
10	Staphorst	26	9	5	12	49	48	+1	32	
11	VVOG (Q, O)	26	7	7	12	29	36	−7	28	Qualification promotion/relegation play-offs Hoofdklasse/Eerste Klasse
12	Urk (Q, R)	26	6	6	14	40	54	−14	24	Qualification promotion/relegation play-offs Hoofdklasse/Eerste Klasse
13	Oranje Nassau Groningen (R)	26	4	9	13	31	67	−36	21	Relegation to 2012–13 Eerste Klasse
14	Drachtster Boys (R)	26	2	7	17	24	63	−39	13	Relegation to 2012–13 Eerste Klasse

(C) Champions; (O) Play-off winners; (P) Promoted; (Q) Qualified for the phase indicated; (R) Relegated

==== Championship play-off ====
In determining which team becomes champion, only the achieved number of points is considered. The goal difference is completely ignored.
Therefore, WHC and DETO were considered to have ended equal and had to play an additional match against each other on neutral ground in Hardenberg to decide which team would become champion and which team would have to play the promotion/relegation Topklasse/Hoofdklasse play-offs.

Team 1	Score	Team 2
WHC	1-2 (aet)	DETO

=== Sunday A ===
Pos	Team	Pld	W	D	L	GF	GA	GD	Pts	Qualification or relegation
1	ADO '20 (Note: Winner of the Second Period (round 9-17).) (C, P)	26	17	7	2	68	26	+42	58	Promotion to 2012–13 Topklasse Sunday
2	Leonidas (Note: Substitute winner of the Second Period.) (Q)	26	14	7	5	53	33	+20	49	Qualification for promotion/relegation play-offs Topklasse/Hoofdklasse
3	Alphense Boys (Note: Winner of the First Period (round 1-8).) (Q)	26	12	8	6	47	33	+14	44	Qualification for promotion/relegation play-offs Topklasse/Hoofdklasse
4	SC Feyenoord	26	10	10	6	54	40	+14	40	
5	RKAVV	26	11	7	8	31	29	+2	40	
6	Chabab (Note: Winner of the Third Period (round 18-26).) (Q, O, P)	26	10	7	9	46	42	+4	37	Qualification for promotion/relegation play-offs Topklasse/Hoofdklasse
7	De Zouaven	26	10	7	9	43	40	+3	37	
8	Nieuwenhoorn	26	9	10	7	38	44	−6	37	
9	Elinkwijk	26	7	8	11	33	42	−9	29	
10	Westlandia	26	8	5	13	37	51	−14	29	
11	DHC (Q, O)	26	6	9	11	47	45	+2	27	Qualification promotion/relegation play-offs Hoofdklasse/Eerste Klasse
12	Koninklijke HFC (Q, O)	26	6	9	11	37	49	−12	27	Qualification promotion/relegation play-offs Hoofdklasse/Eerste Klasse
13	Purmersteijn (R)	26	5	6	15	31	59	−28	21	Relegation to 2012–13 Eerste Klasse
14	AFC '34 (R)	26	4	6	16	31	63	−32	18	Relegation to 2012–13 Eerste Klasse

(C) Champions; (O) Play-off winners; (P) Promoted; (Q) Qualified for the phase indicated; (R) Relegated

=== Sunday B ===
Pos	Team	Pld	W	D	L	GF	GA	GD	Pts	Qualification or relegation
1	Gemert (Note: Winner of the First Period (round 1-8).) (C, P)	26	16	7	3	55	31	+24	55	Promotion to 2012–13 Topklasse Sunday
2	Blauw Geel '38 (Note: Winner of the Third Period (round 18-26).) (Q)	26	13	5	8	49	34	+15	44	Qualification for promotion/relegation play-offs Topklasse/Hoofdklasse
3	Nuenen (Note: Substitute winner of the First Period.) (Q)	26	12	7	7	52	36	+16	43	Qualification for promotion/relegation play-offs Topklasse/Hoofdklasse
4	EHC (Note: Substitute winner of the Second Period since De Valk not allowed to play the promotion play-offs.) (Q)	26	12	7	7	47	35	+12	43	Qualification for promotion/relegation play-offs Topklasse/Hoofdklasse
5	Rosmalen	26	12	6	8	45	31	+14	42	
6	Dongen	26	12	5	9	50	43	+7	41	
7	Groene Ster	26	12	5	9	47	45	+2	41	
8	Baronie	26	9	9	8	39	34	+5	36	
9	Deurne	26	8	9	9	42	37	+5	33	
10	Venray	26	9	5	12	47	54	−7	32	
11	Meerssen (Q, R)	26	8	4	14	35	46	−11	28	Qualification promotion/relegation play-offs Hoofdklasse/Eerste Klasse
12	De Valk (Note: Winner of the Second Period (round 9-17), however not allowed to play the promotion play-offs since forced to play the relegation play-offs.) (Q, R)	26	8	4	14	43	57	−14	28	Qualification promotion/relegation play-offs Hoofdklasse/Eerste Klasse
13	Dijkse Boys (Note: Dijkse Boys received 2 penalty points for bad behavior towards the match officials.) (R)	26	9	3	14	33	57	−24	28	Relegation to 2012–13 Eerste Klasse
14	DESK (R)	26	2	4	20	22	66	−44	10	Relegation to 2012–13 Eerste Klasse

(C) Champions; (P) Promoted; (Q) Qualified for the phase indicated; (R) Relegated

==== Relegation play-off ====
In determining which teams relegate directly and which teams are allowed to play the play-offs to avoid relegation, only the achieved number of points is considered. The goal difference is initially completely ignored. Therefore, Meerssen, de Valk and Dijkse Boys were considered to have ended equal and had to play a play-off to decide which 2 teams were allowed to enter the promotion/relegation Hoofdklasse/Eerste Klasse play-offs. The play-off is a semi competition in which each team plays one match at home and one match away. If two or more teams end with the same number of points not the goal difference of the play-off but the goal difference of the regular season determines the final ranking.

Pos	Team	Pld	W	D	L	GF	GA	GD	Pts	Qualification or relegation
1	Meerssen (Note: The match between Meerssen and Dijkse Boys was cancelled. Even if Dijkse Boys would win against Meerssen, with all teams ending at 3 points, based on the goal difference in the regular season, Meerssen (-11) would end first, De Valk (-14) second and Dijkse Boys (-24) last.) (Q)	1	1	0	0	4	0	+4	3	Qualification promotion/relegation play-offs Hoofdklasse/Eerste Klasse
2	De Valk (Q)	2	1	0	1	2	4	−2	3	Qualification promotion/relegation play-offs Hoofdklasse/Eerste Klasse
3	Dijkse Boys (R)	1	0	0	1	0	2	−2	0	Relegation to 2012–13 Eerste Klasse

(Q) Qualified for the phase indicated; (R) Relegated

=== Sunday C ===
Pos	Team	Pld	W	D	L	GF	GA	GD	Pts	Qualification or relegation
1	Sneek Wit Zwart (Note: Winner of the Third Period (round 14-26 instead of round 18-26, due to withdrawal of Dio Groningen).) (C, P)	24	16	4	4	55	26	+29	52	Promotion to 2012–13 Topklasse Sunday
2	Be Quick 1887 (Note: Substitute winner of the Second Period.) (Q)	24	14	6	4	48	19	+29	48	Qualification for promotion/relegation play-offs Topklasse/Hoofdklasse
3	Alcides (Note: Winner of the Second Period (round 1-13 instead of round 9-17, due to withdrawal of Dio Groningen).) (Q)	24	14	2	8	45	32	+13	44	Qualification for promotion/relegation play-offs Topklasse/Hoofdklasse
4	MSC	24	11	6	7	45	36	+9	39	
5	Rohda Raalte	24	11	6	7	36	28	+8	39	
6	UDI '19 (Note: Winner of the First Period (round 1-8).) (Q)	24	11	3	10	33	45	−12	36	Qualification for promotion/relegation play-offs Topklasse/Hoofdklasse
7	Longa '30	24	8	7	9	39	48	−9	31	
8	RKHVV	24	8	5	11	51	55	−4	29	
9	Juliana '31	24	8	5	11	38	46	−8	29	
10	SC NEC	24	6	10	8	45	36	+9	28	
11	Rigtersbleek (Q, O)	24	7	7	10	37	48	−11	28	Qualification promotion/relegation play-offs Hoofdklasse/Eerste Klasse
12	Hoogeveen (Q, O)	24	5	5	14	37	53	−16	20	Qualification promotion/relegation play-offs Hoofdklasse/Eerste Klasse
13	Babberich (R)	24	2	4	18	19	56	−37	10	Relegation to 2012–13 Eerste Klasse
14	DIO Groningen (Note: On December 1, 2011 DIO Groningen decided to withdraw their team. They were unable to arrange the finances around the team and feared continuing could put the existence of the whole club at risk.) (R)	11	0	2	9	12	42	−30	2	Taken out of competition, all matches declared void

(C) Champions; (O) Play-off winners; (P) Promoted; (Q) Qualified for the phase indicated; (R) Relegated

== Promotion/relegation play-off Topklasse – Hoofdklasse ==
=== First round ===
The 3 period winners of each league are grouped together and play a semi-competition to decide which of the three continues to the second round. Each team plays one match at home and one match away.

==== Saturday A ====
Pos	Team	Pld	W	D	L	GF	GA	GD	Pts	Second round or Hoofdklasse
1	Ter Leede	2	1	0	1	5	1	+4	3	To Second round
2	ODIN '59	2	1	0	1	2	3	−1	3	To 2012–13 Hoofdklasse Saturday
3	Huizen	2	1	0	1	3	6	−3	3	To 2012–13 Hoofdklasse Saturday

==== Saturday B ====
Pos	Team	Pld	W	D	L	GF	GA	GD	Pts	Second round or Hoofdklasse
1	Kozakken Boys (Note: Final ranking based on results in regular season.)	2	1	0	1	6	6	0	3	To Second round
2	ASWH	2	1	0	1	5	5	0	3	To 2012–13 Hoofdklasse Saturday
3	RVVH	2	1	0	1	4	4	0	3	To 2012–13 Hoofdklasse Saturday

==== Saturday C ====
Pos	Team	Pld	W	D	L	GF	GA	GD	Pts	Second round or Hoofdklasse
1	Berkum	2	1	1	0	6	5	+1	4	To Second round
2	ACV	2	1	0	1	3	2	+1	3	To 2012–13 Hoofdklasse Saturday
3	WHC	2	0	1	1	4	6	−2	1	To 2012–13 Hoofdklasse Saturday

==== Sunday A ====
Pos	Team	Pld	W	D	L	GF	GA	GD	Pts	Second round or Hoofdklasse
1	Chabab	2	2	0	0	5	2	+3	6	To Second round
2	Alphense Boys	2	0	1	1	2	3	−1	1	To 2012–13 Hoofdklasse Sunday
3	Leonidas	2	0	1	1	4	6	−2	1	To 2012–13 Hoofdklasse Sunday

==== Sunday B ====
Pos	Team	Pld	W	D	L	GF	GA	GD	Pts	Second round or Hoofdklasse
1	Blauw Geel '38	2	2	0	0	8	2	+6	6	To Second round
2	Nuenen	2	1	0	1	4	8	−4	3	To 2012–13 Hoofdklasse Sunday
3	EHC	2	0	0	2	3	5	−2	0	To 2012–13 Hoofdklasse Sunday

==== Sunday C ====
Pos	Team	Pld	W	D	L	GF	GA	GD	Pts	Second round or Hoofdklasse
1	Be Quick 1887	2	2	0	0	4	1	+3	6	To Second round
2	UDI '19	2	1	0	1	2	1	+1	3	To 2012–13 Hoofdklasse Sunday
3	Alcides	2	0	0	2	1	5	−4	0	To 2012–13 Hoofdklasse Sunday

=== Second and Final round ===
The 3 remaining teams from the Saturday leagues and the team ranked 13th in the 2012–13 Topklasse Saturday league play in a knock-out system for 1 spot in the 2012–13 Topklasse Saturday league.
Likewise, the 3 remaining teams from the Sunday leagues and the team ranked 13th in the 2012–13 Topklasse Sunday league play in a knock-out system for 1 spot in the 2012–13 Topklasse Sunday league.
For details and results see 2011-12 Topklasse Promotion/relegation play-offs.

== Promotion/relegation play-off Hoofdklasse – Eerste Klasse ==
=== Saturday ===
The teams ranked 11th and 12th of each of the 3 Saturday leagues (6 teams) and the 3 period winners of each of the 5 Saturday Eerste Klasse leagues (15 teams), making a total of 21 teams are grouped in 7 groups of 3 teams in such a way that the Hoofdklasse teams each end up in a different group. In each group the 3 teams play a semi-competition in such a way that each team plays one match at home and one match away.
The 7 group winners will play next season in the 2012–13 Hoofdklasse and the remaining teams in the 2012–13 Eerste klasse.

==== Group 1 ====
Pos	Team	Pld	W	D	L	GF	GA	GD	Pts	Hoofdklasse or Eerste Klasse
1	Heinenoord (O)	2	2	0	0	6	3	+3	6	To 2012–13 Hoofdklasse Saturday
2	Voorschoten '97	2	1	0	1	2	2	0	3	To 2012–13 Eerste Klasse Saturday
3	VVZ '49	2	0	0	2	2	5	−3	0	To 2012–13 Eerste Klasse Saturday

(O) Play-off winners

==== Group 2 ====
Pos	Team	Pld	W	D	L	GF	GA	GD	Pts	Hoofdklasse or Eerste Klasse
1	Alexandria '66 (O)	2	2	0	0	6	2	+4	6	To 2012–13 Hoofdklasse Saturday
2	Roda '46	2	1	0	1	5	7	−2	3	To 2012–13 Eerste Klasse Saturday
3	Zwaluwen '30	2	0	0	2	2	4	−2	0	To 2012–13 Eerste Klasse Saturday

(O) Play-off winners

==== Groep 3 ====
Pos	Team	Pld	W	D	L	GF	GA	GD	Pts	Hoofdklasse or Eerste Klasse
1	Achilles Veen (O)	2	2	0	0	7	0	+7	6	To 2012–13 Hoofdklasse Saturday
2	Rijnvogels	2	0	1	1	1	3	−2	1	To 2012–13 Eerste Klasse Saturday
3	VVGZ	2	0	1	1	1	6	−5	1	To 2012–13 Eerste Klasse Saturday

(O) Play-off winners

==== Groep 4 ====
Pos	Team	Pld	W	D	L	GF	GA	GD	Pts	Hoofdklasse or Eerste Klasse
1	Nieuw-Lekkerland (O)	2	2	0	0	8	1	+7	6	To 2012–13 Hoofdklasse Saturday
2	Deltasport	2	1	0	1	2	3	−1	3	To 2012–13 Eerste Klasse Saturday
3	Roda Boys	2	0	0	2	2	8	−6	0	To 2012–13 Eerste Klasse Saturday

(O) Play-off winners

==== Group 5 ====
Pos	Team	Pld	W	D	L	GF	GA	GD	Pts	Hoofdklasse or Eerste Klasse
1	VVA '71 (O)	2	2	0	0	5	2	+3	6	To 2012–13 Hoofdklasse Saturday
2	Go-Ahead Kampen	2	1	0	1	7	5	+2	3	To 2012–13 Eerste Klasse Saturday
3	Viboa	2	0	0	2	2	7	−5	0	To 2012–13 Eerste Klasse Saturday

(O) Play-off winners

==== Group 6 ====
Pos	Team	Pld	W	D	L	GF	GA	GD	Pts	Hoofdklasse or Eerste Klasse
1	VVOG (O)	2	2	0	0	8	0	+8	6	To 2012–13 Hoofdklasse Saturday
2	Barneveld	2	1	0	1	5	2	+3	3	To 2012–13 Eerste Klasse Saturday
3	PKC '83	2	0	0	2	1	12	−11	0	To 2012–13 Eerste Klasse Saturday

(O) Play-off winners

==== Group 7 ====
Pos	Team	Pld	W	D	L	GF	GA	GD	Pts	Hoofdklasse or Eerste Klasse
1	NSC (O)	2	2	0	0	4	1	+3	6	To 2012–13 Hoofdklasse Saturday
2	Oeverzwaluwen	2	1	0	1	4	3	+1	3	To 2012–13 Eerste Klasse Saturday
3	Urk	2	0	0	2	1	5	−4	0	To 2012–13 Eerste Klasse Saturday

(O) Play-off winners

=== Sunday ===
The teams ranked 11th and 12th of each of the 3 Sunday leagues (6 teams) and the 3 period winners of each of the 6 Sunday Eerste Klasse leagues (18 teams), making a total of 24 teams, play in a 2-round 2 leg knockout system in such a way that the Hoofdklasse teams can never meet each other.
The 6 winners of the second round matches will play next season in the 2012–13 Hoofdklasse and the remaining teams in the 2012–13 Eerste klasse.

First round
1	Blauw-Wit	2	1	3
4	DHC	4	2	6
3	VELO	1	2	3
2	VVIJ	2	2	4

Final round
DHC	3	0	3
VVIJ	2	0	2

First round
1	Koninklijke HFC	3	0	3
4	Neptunus-Schiebroek	1	1	2
3	DEM ^{(Penalties)}	3	1	4 (5)
2	Boshuizen	2	2	4 (4)

Final round
Koninklijke HFC	5	0	5
DEM	0	1	1

First round
1	Nemelaer ^{(Penalties)}	1	1	2 (8)
4	Meerssen	0	2	2 (7)
3	Heidebloem	0	1	1
2	GOES	4	4	8

Final round
Nemelaer	0	1	1
GOES	2	3	5

First round
1	De Valk	0	1	1
4	Someren ^{(a.e.t.)}	0	2	2
3	Geldrop	0	4	4
2	HVCH	3	4	7

Final round
Someren	2	1	3
HVCH	1	0	1

First round
1	Germania	1	0	1
4	Rigtersbleek	0	5	5
3	Joure	1	1	2
2	Glanerbrug	7	6	13

Final round
Rigtersbleek	2	2	4
Glanerbrug	2	1	3

First round
1	Hoogeveen	4	4	8
4	Erica	2	4	6
3	Rheden	4	1	5
2	FVC	3	3	6

Final round
Hoogeveen	1	3	4
FVC	1	0	1
