= 2011–12 KNVB Cup =

Tournament details
- Country: Netherlands
- Teams: 92

Final positions
- Champions: PSV Eindhoven
- Runners-up: Heracles Almelo
- UEFA Europa League: PSV Eindhoven

Tournament statistics
- Top goal scorer: Bas Dost (6)

The 2011–12 KNVB Cup was the 94th season of the Dutch national football knockout tournament. The competition began on 24 August 2011 with the matches of Round 1 and ended with the final on 8 April 2012. FC Twente were the defending champions having won the cup the previous season. The winner PSV Eindhoven qualifies for the play-off round of the 2012–13 UEFA Europa League.

== Calendar ==
The calendar for the 2011–12 KNVB Cup was as follows.

Rounds	Date
First round	24 August 2011
Second round	20, 21 or 22 September 2011
Third round	25, 26, or 27 October 2011
Fourth round	20, 21 or 22 December 2011
Quarter-finals	31 January 2012 or 1 or 2 February 2012
Semi-finals	21 and 22 March 2012
Final	8 April 2012

== First round ==
56 amateur clubs competed in this stage of the competition for a place in the Second Round. These matches took place on 24 August 2011.

Team 1	Score	Team 2
Zwaluwen '30	3−0	Susteren
Hollandia	0−1	SVV Scheveningen
Staphorst	4−2	Groene Ster
De Treffers	1−0	Rijnsburgse Boys
SVZW Wierden	4−5 (a.e.t.)	HBS Craeyenhout
Someren	1−4	Genemuiden
ARC	6−2	Quick '20
Sparta Nijkerk	5−1	Hoogland
VCK	0−5	Argon
Actief	1−2 (a.e.t.)	Excelsior '31
GOES	1−5	Zwaluwen
Capelle	1−1 (a.e.t.); 4−5 (pen)	WKE
IJsselmeervogels	2−1	AFC
Achilles '29	1−0	Katwijk
Haaglandia	0−1	Lisse
N.E.C. amateurs	2−3	Harkemase Boys
Barendrecht	2−2 (a.e.t.); 4−3 (pen)	Hilversum
Lienden	3−4	VV Bennekom
Alphense Boys	0−1	Montfoort
Urk	1−2	VV Berkum
ODIN '59	1−2 (a.e.t.)	VVSB
UNA	2−0	Spakenburg
JVC Cuijk	1−1 (a.e.t.); 7−6 (pen)	Voorschoten '97
GVVV	3−1	Nemelaer
Noordwijk	4−1	EHC
Young Boys	1−2	HSC '21
Be Quick 1887	0−3	HHC Hardenberg
EVV	5−3	Hoek

== Second round ==
The 28 winners from the First Round entered this stage of the competition along with the 18 Eerste Divisie clubs and the 18 Eredivisie clubs. These matches took place from 20 to 22 September 2011.

Team 1	Score	Team 2
Montfoort	1−6	Sparta Rotterdam
VVV-Venlo	0−2	SC Heerenveen
Feyenoord	4−0	AGOVV Apeldoorn
SC Cambuur	0−1	FC Zwolle
VV Bennekom	1−6	Roda JC
Harkemase Boys	4−2 (a.e.t.)	Willem II
IJsselmeervogels	0−1	FC Dordrecht
Go Ahead Eagles	3−1 (a.e.t.)	Helmond Sport
Fortuna Sittard	2−4 (a.e.t.)	NEC
WKE	1−2	FC Den Bosch
Sparta Nijkerk	4−2 (a.e.t.)	Staphorst
Zwaluwen '30	1−2	GVVV
EVV	1−5	FC Oss
Excelsior '31	0−5	SBV Excelsior
ARC	0−8	MVV Maastricht
Vitesse Arnhem	0−0 (a.e.t.); 5−4 (pen)	NAC Breda
SVV Scheveningen	1−3	ADO Den Haag
VVSB	0−8	PSV Eindhoven
Noordwijk	1−3	Ajax
Zwaluwen	1−8	FC Twente
Genemuiden	3−1	HSC '21
Argon	0−2	Almere City FC
JVC Cuijk	0−1	Heracles Almelo
De Treffers	3−2	HHC Hardenberg
FC Eindhoven	3−1	FC Emmen
HBS Craeyenhout	2−3	Lisse
UNA	1−3	FC Volendam
Barendrecht	0−3	RKC Waalwijk
VV Berkum	2−0	SC Veendam
De Graafschap	1−1 (a.e.t.); 4−3 (pen)	FC Utrecht
Achilles '29	1−1 (a.e.t.); 3–2 (pen)	Telstar
AZ	4−2 (a.e.t.)	FC Groningen

== Third round ==
These matches took place from 25 to 27 October 2011.

Team 1	Score	Team 2
Achilles '29 (III)	1 − 0	MVV Maastricht (II)
Almere City FC (II)	1 − 2	FC Eindhoven (II)
SBV Excelsior	0 − 3	GVVV (III)
FC Oss (II)	3 − 1 (a.e.t.)	FC Den Bosch (II)
SC Heerenveen	6 − 1	Harkemase Boys (III)
FC Zwolle (II)	0 − 1	RKC Waalwijk
Vitesse Arnhem	2 − 1	ADO Den Haag
De Treffers (III)	1 − 5	De Graafschap
FC Twente	4 − 3	Genemuiden (III)
Heracles Almelo	4 − 0	VV Berkum (IV)
PSV Eindhoven	3 − 0	Lisse (III)
Sparta Rotterdam (II)	4 − 0	Sparta Nijkerk (IV)
Roda JC	2 − 4	Ajax
FC Dordrecht (II)	2 − 3 (a.e.t.)	AZ
NEC	1 − 0	FC Volendam (II)
Go Ahead Eagles (II)	2 − 1	Feyenoord

== Fourth round ==
These matches took place from 20 to 22 December 2011.

Team 1	Score	Team 2
Ajax	2 − 3^{1}	AZ
RKC Waalwijk	3 − 2	Go Ahead Eagles (II)
FC Eindhoven (II)	1 − 2	Vitesse Arnhem
Heracles Almelo	4 − 0	De Graafschap
SC Heerenveen	11 − 1	FC Oss (II)
NEC	3 − 0	Achilles '29 (III)
FC Twente	1−2 (a.e.t.)	PSV Eindhoven
Sparta Rotterdam (II)	1−1 (a.e.t.); 4-5 (pen)	GVVV (III)

1 The original match was abandoned in the 38th minute with Ajax leading 1–0 after AZ left the pitch when their goalkeeper Esteban Alvarado received a red card for kicking a drunk fan that invaded the field and attacked him; the red card was later rescinded. The match was replayed in full behind closed doors on 19 January 2012.

== Quarter-finals ==
These matches took place on 31 January 2012.

Team 1	Score	Team 2
Vitesse Arnhem	1−2	SC Heerenveen
Heracles Almelo	3−0	RKC Waalwijk
AZ	2−1	GVVV (III)
PSV Eindhoven	3−2	NEC

== Semi-finals ==
21 March 2012
20:45

SC Heerenveen	1 – 3	PSV Eindhoven
Elm 34'		Labyad 23'; Wijnaldum 46'; Matavž 50'

Abe Lenstra Stadion, Heerenveen
Attendance: 26,000
Referee: Bas Nijhuis

22 March 2012
20:45

AZ	2 – 4 (a.e.t.)	Heracles Almelo
Maher 20'; Guðmundsson 22'		Everton 7'; Quansah 66'; Bruns 110'; Gouriye 120'

AFAS Stadion, Alkmaar
Attendance: 10,669
Referee: Richard Liesveld

== Final ==
8 April 2012
18:00

PSV Eindhoven	3 – 0	Heracles Almelo
Toivonen 31'; Mertens 56'; Lens 63'

De Kuip, Rotterdam
Attendance: 50,000
Referee: Pol van Boekel
