= 2012–13 Topklasse =

3rd season of the third-tier football league in the Netherlands

Topklasse
- Season: 2012–13
- Champions: Katwijk
- Promoted: Achilles '29

The 2012–13 Topklasse season is the third edition of the Dutch third tier since its inauguration in the current form in 2010. A total 32 teams are participating in the league: 24 from the 2011–12 Topklasse, and the remaining eight from the 2011–12 Hoofdklasse. As usual, the competition is divided into two leagues: "Saturday" and "Sunday", who differ by the day their games are usually played.

For the second consecutive season, no team was relegated from the Eerste Divisie, this time due to the fact all 2011–12 Topklasse have declined promotion into professionalism.

== Teams ==
=== Saturday league ===
Location of teams in the Saturday Topklasse 2012-2013

Club	City	2011–12 season
BVV Barendrecht	Barendrecht	12th in Topklasse Saturday
vv Capelle	Capelle aan den IJssel	10th in Topklasse Saturday
DETO	Vriezenveen	1st in Hoofdklasse Saturday C
Excelsior '31	Rijssen	8th in Topklasse Saturday
SC Genemuiden	Genemuiden	7th in Topklasse Saturday
GVVV	Veenendaal	5th in Topklasse Saturday
HHC Hardenberg	Hardenberg	9th in Topklasse Saturday
CVV de Jodan Boys	Gouda	1st in Hoofdklasse Saturday A
VV Katwijk	Katwijk	3rd in Topklasse Saturday
Kozakken Boys	Werkendam	2nd in Hoofdklasse Saturday B
FC Lisse	Lisse	11th in Topklasse Saturday
VV Noordwijk	Noordwijk	4th in Topklasse Saturday
Rijnsburgse Boys	Rijnsburg	2nd in Topklasse Saturday
SVV Scheveningen	Scheveningen (The Hague)	1st in Hoofdklasse Saturday B
SV Spakenburg	Bunschoten-Spakenburg	1st in Topklasse Saturday
IJsselmeervogels	Bunschoten-Spakenburg	6th in Topklasse Saturday

=== Sunday league ===
Location of teams in the Sunday Topklasse 2012-2013

Club	City	2011–12 season
Achilles '29	Groesbeek	1st in Topklasse Sunday
ADO '20	Heemskerk	1st in Hoofdklasse Sunday A
AFC	Amsterdam	10th in Topklasse Sunday
FC Chabab	Amsterdam	6th in Hoofdklasse Sunday B
De Treffers	Groesbeek	4th in Topklasse Sunday
HBS Craeyenhout	The Hague	9th in Topklasse Sunday
EVV	Echt	6th in Topklasse Sunday
VV Gemert	Gemert	1st in Hoofdklasse Sunday B
HSC '21	Haaksbergen	5th in Topklasse Sunday
Haaglandia	Rijswijk	2nd in Topklasse Sunday
HVV Hollandia	Hoorn	8th in Topklasse Sunday
JVC Cuijk	Cuijk	11th in Topklasse Sunday
FC Lienden	Lienden	7th in Topklasse Sunday
SWZ	Sneek	1st in Hoofdklasse Sunday C
WKE Emmen	Emmen	3rd in Topklasse Sunday
VVSB	Noordwijkerhout	12th in Topklasse Sunday

== League tables ==
=== Saturday league ===
Pos	Team	Pld	W	D	L	GF	GA	GD	Pts	Qualification or relegation
1	Katwijk (Q)	30	17	5	8	77	47	+30	56	Qualification for playoff finals
2	Barendrecht	30	15	9	6	51	34	+17	54	
3	GVVV	30	16	4	10	54	41	+13	52	
4	HHC Hardenberg	30	16	3	11	62	49	+13	51	
5	Rijnsburgse Boys	30	14	8	8	60	42	+18	50	
6	FC Lisse	30	14	8	8	52	42	+10	50	
7	Capelle	30	15	4	11	54	41	+13	49	
8	Kozakken Boys	30	15	2	13	61	59	+2	47	
9	Noordwijk	30	12	8	10	51	48	+3	44	
10	Excelsior '31	30	12	4	14	49	58	−9	40	
11	Scheveningen	30	11	6	13	45	46	−1	39	
12	IJsselmeervogels	30	10	9	11	44	48	−4	39	
13	Spakenburg (Q)	30	10	5	15	47	54	−7	35	Qualification for relegation playoffs
14	Genemuiden (R)	30	9	5	16	63	74	−11	32	Relegation to 2013-14 Hoofdklasse
15	Jodan Boys (R)	30	9	5	16	38	58	−20	32	Relegation to 2013-14 Hoofdklasse
16	DETO (R)	30	2	1	27	18	85	−67	7	Relegation to 2013-14 Hoofdklasse

Updated to match(es) played on 11 May 2013. Source: https://www.soccerway.com/national/netherlands/topklasse/20122013/saturday/
Rules for classification: 1) points; 2) goal difference; 3) number of goals scored.
(Q) Qualified for the phase indicated; (R) Relegated

=== Sunday league ===
Pos	Team	Pld	W	D	L	GF	GA	GD	Pts	Qualification or relegation
1	Achilles '29 (P, Q)	30	22	2	6	70	23	+47	68	Qualification for playoff finals
2	ADO '20	30	15	8	7	66	53	+13	53	
3	De Treffers	30	15	5	10	60	36	+24	50	
4	WKE	30	15	5	10	64	60	+4	50	
5	EVV	30	14	6	10	37	35	+2	48	
6	HSC '21	30	14	4	12	67	57	+10	46	
7	Lienden	30	14	4	12	50	45	+5	46	
8	HBS	30	13	5	12	47	55	−8	44	
9	VVSB	30	12	7	11	37	42	−5	43	
10	JVC Cuijk	30	11	6	13	47	43	+4	39	
11	AFC	30	11	6	13	44	43	+1	39	
12	Chabab	30	10	9	11	36	42	−6	38	
13	Haaglandia (Q)	30	11	3	16	57	70	−13	36	Qualification for relegation playoffs
14	Hollandia (R)	30	10	5	15	37	45	−8	35	Relegation to 2013–14 Hoofdklasse
15	Gemert (R)	30	6	5	19	33	62	−29	23	Relegation to 2013–14 Hoofdklasse
16	Sneek Wit Zwart (R)	30	5	4	21	26	67	−41	19	Relegation to 2013–14 Hoofdklasse

Updated to match(es) played on 12 May 2013. Source: https://www.soccerway.com/national/netherlands/topklasse/20122013/sunday/
Rules for classification: 1) points; 2) goal difference; 3) number of goals scored.
(P) Promoted; (Q) Qualified for the phase indicated; (R) Relegated

== Championship play-offs ==
Team 1	Agg.	Team 2	1st leg	2nd leg
Katwijk	3–0	Achilles '29	0–0	3–0

Katwijk won the overall Topklasse title. Katwijk didn't apply to promote to the Eerste Divisie, Achilles '29 did. Therefore, Achilles was promoted to the 2013–14 Eerste Divisie.

== Promotion/relegation play-offs ==
=== Topklasse / Hoofdklasse playoff semifinals ===
Team 1	Agg.	Team 2	1st leg	2nd leg
ASWH	3–4	ACV	0–1	3–3
Spakenburg	5–2	Bennekom	2–0	3–2
EHC	5–7	Juliana '31	0–2	5–5
Haaglandia	1–0	Alphense Boys	0–0	1–0 (aet)

=== Topklasse / Hoofdklasse playoff finals ===
Team 1	Score	Team 2
Spakenburg	2–1 (aet)	ACV

Because Achilles '29 promoted to the 2013–14 Eerste Divisie, there was an extra spot in the 2013–14 Sunday Topklasse. Therefore, Juliana '31 and Haaglandia didn't have to play the playoff final, as they were both qualified for the 2013-14 Topklasse. Spakenburg won the playoffs for the Saturday Topklasse and were not relegated.
