= Thomas Verheydt =

Dutch footballer (born 1992)

Personal information
- Full name: Thomas Jacco Verheydt
- Date of birth: 24 January 1992 (age 34)
- Place of birth: The Hague, Netherlands
- Height: 1.92 m (6 ft 4 in)
- Position: Forward

Team information
- Current team: Willem II
- Number: 28

Youth career
- Wilhelmus
- 2000–2004: Feyenoord
- 2004–2012: ADO Den Haag

Senior career*
Years	Team	Apps	(Gls)
2012–2013	Jodan Boys	15	(7)
2013–2015	IJsselmeervogels	56	(27)
2015–2017	MVV	61	(15)
2017–2018	Crawley Town	20	(2)
2018–2019	Go Ahead Eagles	30	(13)
2019–2021	Almere City	52	(30)
2021–2023	ADO Den Haag	70	(44)
2023–2025	Çorum	58	(16)
2025–	Willem II	36	(12)
- * Club domestic league appearances and goals as of 07:59, 11 November 2026 (UTC)

Thomas Jacco Verheydt (born 24 January 1992) is a Dutch professional footballer who plays as a forward for Eredivisie club Willem II.

Verheydt began his career in the Dutch amateur leagues with Jodan Boys and IJsselmeervogels, earning a reputation as a prolific goalscorer. In 2015, he signed with MVV in the Eerste Divisie, and two years later moved abroad to join English side Crawley Town. He returned to the Netherlands in 2018, representing Go Ahead Eagles, Almere City and ADO Den Haag. At ADO, he enjoyed his most productive spell, scoring 30 goals in the 2021–22 season. In 2023, Verheydt joined Turkish club Çorum, before returning to the Netherlands in 2025 to sign for Willem II.

== Club career ==
=== Jodan Boys ===
Born in The Hague and after youth spells with Wilhelmus, Feyenoord and ADO Den Haag, Verheydt joined Topklasse side Jodan Boys in 2012, making his debut during their 2–1 victory over IJsselmeervogels, in which he scored in the 39th minute. A week later, Verheydt continued his impressive form with a goal during Jodan Boys' 5–3 away triumph against Noordwijk. During October 2012, Verheydt suffered a long-term injury which ruled him out until April 2013. By the end of the 2012–13 campaign, Verheydt had registered fifteen league appearances, netting seven times.

=== IJsselmeervogels ===
Following an impressive campaign with Jodan Boys, Verheydt opted to join fellow Topklasse side IJsselmeervogels in July 2013. On 24 August 2013, Verheydt made his debut for IJsselmeervogels in their 0–0 draw against Lisse, replacing Nabil El Gourari in the 56th minute. A month later, Verheydt registered his first goal for the club, during IJsselmeervogels' 1–1 home draw with HHC Hardenberg, netting the hosts' equaliser in the 66th minute. Following his first goal for the club, Verheydt went onto net four more times in the month of October during their victories over Ter Leede and Excelsior Maassluis. On 14 December 2013, Verheydt netted his 10th league goal of the season during IJsselmeervogels' reverse fixture against Lisse.

After an impressive debut season with IJsselmeervogels, netting thirteen league goals in twenty-seven appearances, Verheydt registered his first goal of the 2014–15 campaign, during the club's 2–2 draw with HSV Hoek.

=== MVV ===
On 5 August 2015, Verheydt joined Eerste Divisie side MVV, following an impressive record with both Jodan Boys and IJsselmeervogels in the Topklasse. On 6 November 2015, Verheydt scored on his MVV Maastricht debut in their 1–0 victory over Jong Ajax, coming on in the 57th minute for Luca Polizzi and netting in the 90th minute. Following his debut campaign in the Eerste Divisie, Verheydt struggled to adapt and only registered twelve starts all season, netting four times. However, during his second season at MVV Maastricht, Verheydt netted thirteen times in all competitions, including eleven league goals and one each in the KNVB Cup and Eerste Divisie play-offs.

=== Crawley Town ===
On 6 July 2017, Verheydt opted to join English club Crawley Town on a three-year deal. On 5 August 2017, Verheydt made his Crawley Town debut during their 3–1 home defeat against Port Vale, featuring for the entire 90 minutes.

=== Go Ahead Eagles ===
On 16 July 2018, following a year in England, Verheydt returned to the Netherlands to join Go Ahead Eagles on a two-year deal with the option of an additional year. With Verheydt as their regular striker, Go Ahead Eagles reached the finals of the play-offs for promotion. However, they lost in a shootout against RKC Waalwijk (5–4), who were promoted at the expense of the team from Deventer. He finished the season with 35 appearances in which he scored 13 goals.

=== Almere City ===
On 18 July 2019, Almere City announced that Verheydt had joined the club on a two-year contract. He made his debut for the club on 9 August in a 1–1 away draw against Roda JC Kerkrade. His first goal came the following week in a 3–2 home win over Jong PSV. As a second-half substitute, Verheydt headed home a corner to secure the win for Almere City. He scored 10 goals in 15 competitive appearances in his first season at the club and 20 in 39 in his second, the latter of which broke the club's record for most league goals in a season.

=== ADO Den Haag ===
==== 2021–22: Goalscoring form and missed promotion ====
On 5 August 2021, it was announced that Verheydt had signed a three-year contract with ADO Den Haag, newly relegated to the Eerste Divisie club. This move allowed him to return to his hometown club, which he had been a fan of since childhood. He has also mentioned that during his youth, he frequented the stands of ADO's former home ground, the Zuiderparkstadion.

Three days after signing, he made his debut in the league game against Jong Ajax, replacing Tyrese Asante in the 60th minute. He immediately made an impact, scoring sixteen minutes later to seal the final result; a 2–0 victory. Five days later, on 13 August, he scored his second goal for ADO in the 19th minute of a 3–1 away win over Volendam, after making his first start for De Residentieclub. His goalscoring form continued in the following months, and he scored his first hat-trick of the season on 10 October, helping ADO to a 3–2 home victory against FC Den Bosch in the Eerste Divisie. On 10 and 17 December, he scored consecutive braces, helping ADO secure victories over Jong AZ and NAC Breda. The goals brought his total tally to 16 goals in just 12 league games appearances.

Verheydt's form continued into 2022, with highlights including a hat-trick against VVV-Venlo on 1 April and a brace against Jong PSV on 19 April. Despite scoring 30 goals in 36 regular season league appearances, Verheydt missed out on the award for top goalscorer that season to Thijs Dallinga, who scored two goals more in 37 appearances. ADO also missed out on direct promotion to the Eredivisie, finishing eight points behind second-place Volendam in the Eerste Divisie. In the promotion play-offs, Verheydt netted three goals in four appearances, notably finding the back of the net in the final playoff match against Excelsior on 29 May 2022. ADO had taken a commanding 3–0 lead in that game after a 1–1 draw in the first leg away at the Van Donge & De Roo Stadion. However, ADO encountered challenges, including a red card for Tyrese Asante. The match ended 4–4 after extra time, and Excelsior emerged victorious in the penalty shootout, ultimately extinguishing ADO's hopes of promotion. Verheydt ended the season with 37 goals in 43 appearances, which included league, KNVB Cup, and play-off games.

==== 2022–23: Mixed fortunes ====
On 23 June 2022, ahead of the 2022–23 season, Verheydt extended his contract with ADO until 2025. The team had a rollercoaster season, during which Verheydt witnessed the dismissal of their new head coach, Dirk Kuyt, in November 2022 due to poor results. Under the guidance of his replacement, Dick Advocaat, the team showed improvement but ultimately finished in 12th place, missing out on a spot in the promotion play-offs by seven points. Despite a decrease in his goal production compared to the previous season, Verheydt continued to demonstrate his prowess in front of the goal, netting 15 times in 36 appearances across competitions.

=== Çorum ===
On 6 July 2023, ADO officially announced that Verheydt had departed the club to join Turkish club Çorum, a recently promoted team in the TFF First League. He signed a two-year contract with the club. At Çorum, he was reunited with fellow countryman Murat Yıldırım, who not only owned the club but also played for it. On the first matchday of the 2023–24 season, 13 August, Verheydt made a remarkable debut for the team by scoring two goals from the spot, narrowly missing out on a hat-trick.

=== Willem II ===
On 8 July 2025, Verheydt returned to the Netherlands and signed a one-year contract, with an option for a second, with Eerste Divisie club Willem II, following the expiration of his deal with Çorum. Willem II had been relegated from the Eredivisie the previous season.

== Career statistics ==
As of match played 6 November 2026

Appearances and goals by club, season and competition
Club	Season	League			National Cup		League Cup		Other		Total	
Club	Season	Division	Apps	Goals	Apps	Goals	Apps	Goals	Apps	Goals	Apps	Goals
Jodan Boys	2012–13	Topklasse	15	7	0	0	—		—		15	7
IJsselmeervogels	2013–14	Topklasse	27	13	3	3	—		—		30	16
IJsselmeervogels	2014–15	Topklasse	29	14	1	1	—		—		30	15
IJsselmeervogels	Total		56	27	4	4	—		—		60	31
MVV	2015–16	Eerste Divisie	23	4	0	0	—		4 (Note: Appearance(s) in Eerste Divisie play-offs)	0	27	4
MVV	2016–17	Eerste Divisie	38	11	1	1	—		4	1	43	13
MVV	Total		61	15	1	1	—		8	1	70	17
Crawley Town	2017–18	League Two	20	2	1	0	0	0	1 (Note: Appearance(s) in EFL Trophy)	0	22	2
Go Ahead Eagles	2018–19	Eerste Divisie	30	13	1	0	—		4	0	35	13
Almere City	2019–20	Eerste Divisie	15	10	0	0	—		—		15	10
Almere City	2020–21	Eerste Divisie	37	20	1	0	—		1	0	39	20
Almere City	Total		52	30	1	0	—		1	0	54	30
ADO Den Haag	2021–22	Eerste Divisie	36	30	3	4	—		4	3	43	37
ADO Den Haag	2022–23	Eerste Divisie	34	14	2	1	—		—		36	15
ADO Den Haag	Total		70	44	5	5	—		4	3	79	52
Çorum	2023–24	TFF First League	27	11	1	1	—		3 (Note: Appearance(s) in TFF First League play-offs)	1	31	13
Çorum	2024–25	TFF First League	31	5	1	0	—		—		32	5
Çorum	Total		58	16	2	1	—		3	1	63	18
Willem II	2025–26	Eerste Divisie	27	10	0	0	—		0	0	27	10
Willem II	2026–27	Eredivisie	9	1	0	0	—		—		9	1
Willem II	Total		36	11	0	0	—		0	0	36	11
Career total			398	165	15	11	0	0	21	5	434	181
