= 2011–12 Topklasse =

2nd season of the third-tier football league in the Netherlands

Topklasse
- Season: 2011–12
- Champions: Achilles '29
- Promoted: none

The 2011–12 Topklasse season was the second edition of the Dutch league since its inception in 2010. A total 32 teams competed in the league: 24 from the 2010–11 Topklasse, and the remaining eight from the 2010–11 Hoofdklasse. As usual, the competition was divided into two leagues: "Saturday" and "Sunday", who differ by the day their games are usually played.

For this season, no team was promoted to the Eerste Divisie, due to the fact all league teams declined to apply for that. Promotion to the higher tier for a Topklasse requires it to switch into full professionalism and play on Friday nights instead of either Saturday or Sunday afternoons. The league was won by Sunday champions Achilles '29 from Groesbeek, who defeated Saturday champions SV Spakenburg in a two-legged final (5–0 aggregate).

== Teams ==
=== Saturday league ===
Location of teams in the Saturday Topklasse 2011–2012

Club	City	2010–11 season
ARC	Alphen aan den Rijn	12th in Topklasse Saturday
BVV Barendrecht	Barendrecht	9th in Topklasse Saturday
Excelsior '31	Rijssen, Rijssen-Holten	5th in Topklasse Saturday
GVVV	Veenendaal	1st in Hoofdklasse Saturday B
Harkemase Boys	Harkema, Achtkarspelen	10th in Topklasse Saturday
HHC Hardenberg	Hardenberg	8th in Topklasse Saturday
FC Lisse	Lisse	11th in Topklasse Saturday
VV Montfoort	Montfoort	3rd in Hoofdklasse Saturday B
VV Noordwijk	Noordwijk	1st in Hoofdklasse Saturday A
Rijnsburgse Boys	Rijnsburg	3rd in Topklasse Saturday
SC Genemuiden	Genemuiden	7th in Topklasse Saturday
SVZW	Wierden	1st in Hoofdklasse Saturday C
SV Spakenburg	Spakenburg, Bunschoten	2nd in Topklasse Saturday
vv Capelle	Capelle aan den IJssel	6th in Topklasse Saturday
VV Katwijk	Katwijk	4th in Topklasse Saturday
IJsselmeervogels	Spakenburg, Bunschoten	1st in Topklasse Saturday

=== Sunday league ===
Location of teams in the Sunday Topklasse 2011–2012

Club	City	2010–11 season
Achilles '29	Groesbeek	2nd in Topklasse Sunday
AFC	Amsterdam	4th in Topklasse Sunday
De Treffers	Groesbeek	5th in Topklasse Sunday
HBS	The Hague	1st in Hoofdklasse Sunday A
EVV	Echt, Echt-Susteren	9th in Topklasse Sunday
FC Hilversum	Hilversum	13th in Topklasse Sunday
FC Lienden	Lienden, Buren	10th in Topklasse Sunday
HSC '21	Haaksbergen	1st in Hoofdklasse Sunday C
UNA	Zeelst, Veldhoven	1st in Hoofdklasse Sunday B
Haaglandia	Rijswijk	7th in Topklasse Sunday
HVV Hollandia	Hoorn	12th in Topklasse Sunday
JVC Cuijk	Cuijk	6th in Topklasse Sunday
Quick '20	Oldenzaal	8th in Topklasse Sunday
SV Argon	Mijdrecht, De Ronde Venen	3rd in Topklasse Sunday
WKE	Emmen	3rd in Hoofdklasse Sunday C
VVSB	Noordwijkerhout	11th in Topklasse Sunday

== League tables ==
=== Saturday league ===
Pos	Team	Pld	W	D	L	GF	GA	GD	Pts	Qualification or relegation
1	Spakenburg (Q)	30	20	5	5	84	44	+40	65	Qualification for playoff finals
2	Rijnsburgse Boys	30	19	7	4	76	36	+40	64	
3	Katwijk	30	15	10	5	78	41	+37	55	
4	Noordwijk	30	16	7	7	66	43	+23	55	
5	GVVV	30	16	5	9	70	56	+14	53	
6	IJsselmeervogels	30	15	3	12	67	50	+17	48	
7	Genemuiden	30	14	5	11	60	55	+5	47	
8	Excelsior '31	30	14	3	13	39	47	−8	45	
9	HHC Hardenberg	30	14	3	13	48	59	−11	45	
10	Capelle	30	11	9	10	47	46	+1	42	
11	Lisse	30	10	8	12	48	56	−8	38	
12	Barendrecht	30	9	9	12	39	40	−1	30 (Note: Barendrecht deducted 6 points due to having played footballer Marvin van der Pluijm in league games against Spakenburg and GVVV, while still contracted with US club Dayton Dutch Lions.)	
13	Harkemase Boys (R)	30	7	4	19	39	61	−22	25	Qualification for relegation playoffs
14	SVZW (R)	30	7	4	19	36	72	−36	25	Relegation to 2012–13 Hoofdklasse
15	Montfoort (R)	30	4	8	18	34	73	−39	18 (Note: Montfoort deducted 2 points due to violent behaviour during a game against SVZW.)	Relegation to 2012–13 Hoofdklasse
16	ARC (R)	30	2	4	24	36	88	−52	10	Relegation to 2012–13 Hoofdklasse

Updated to match(es) played on 28 May 2012. Source: https://www.soccerway.com/national/netherlands/topklasse/2011-2012/saturday/
Rules for classification: 1) points; 2) goal difference; 3) number of goals scored.
(Q) Qualified for the phase indicated; (R) Relegated

=== Sunday league ===
Pos	Team	Pld	W	D	L	GF	GA	GD	Pts	Qualification or relegation
1	Achilles '29 (C, Q)	30	23	2	5	72	26	+46	71	Qualification for playoff finals
2	Haaglandia	30	20	2	8	82	50	+32	62	
3	WKE	30	16	5	9	52	49	+3	53	
4	De Treffers	30	14	8	8	59	41	+18	50	
5	HSC '21	30	13	10	7	61	40	+21	49	
6	EVV	30	13	8	9	50	43	+7	47	
7	Lienden	30	14	4	12	49	40	+9	46	
8	Hollandia	30	14	4	12	45	39	+6	46	
9	HBS	30	14	2	14	55	62	−7	44	
10	AFC	30	10	8	12	57	55	+2	38	
11	JVC Cuijk	30	10	7	13	44	49	−5	37	
12	VVSB	30	10	7	13	37	41	−4	37	
13	UNA (R)	30	9	5	16	48	62	−14	32	Qualification for relegation playoffs
14	Hilversum (R)	30	8	7	15	35	60	−25	31	Relegation to 2012–13 Hoofdklasse
15	Argon (R)	30	6	7	17	38	63	−25	25	Relegation to 2012–13 Hoofdklasse
16	Quick '20 (R)	30	2	2	26	23	87	−64	8	Relegation to 2012–13 Hoofdklasse

Updated to match(es) played on 28 May 2012. Source: https://www.soccerway.com/national/netherlands/topklasse/2011-2012/sunday/
Rules for classification: 1) points; 2) goal difference; 3) number of goals scored.
(C) Champions; (Q) Qualified for the phase indicated; (R) Relegated

=== Championship play-offs ===
Team 1	Agg.	Team 2	1st leg	2nd leg
Achilles '29	5–0	Spakenburg	3–0	2–0

Achilles '29 won the overall Topklasse title. As neither them nor runners-up Spakenburg applied for that, no Topklasse team was promoted to 2012–13 Eerste Divisie.

=== Promotion/relegation play-offs ===
==== 13th place play-off – Saturday league ====
Harkemase Boys and SVZW both finished the season with 25 points. So there was an extra match between them to decide who could play relegation playoffs and who had to relegate immediately.

Team 1	Score	Team 2
Harkemase Boys	2–0	SVZW

SVZW relegated to 2012–13 Hoofdklasse. Harkemase Boys will play relegation playoffs.

==== Topklasse / Hoofdklasse playoff semifinals ====
Team 1	Agg.	Team 2	1st leg	2nd leg
Berkum	4–6	Ter Leede	1–2	3–4
Harkemase Boys	1–8	Kozakken Boys	0–4	1–4
Blauw Geel '38	1–1(4–5p)	Be Quick 1887	0–1	1–0
Chabab	4–2	UNA	1–2	3–0

==== Topklasse / Hoofdklasse playoff finals ====
Team 1	Score	Team 2
Ter Leede	1–5	Kozakken Boys
Be Quick 1887	0–0(4–5p)	Chabab

Kozakken Boys promoted to 2012–13 Topklasse Saturday; Chabab promoted to 2012–13 Topklasse Sunday.
