= Bacuna =

Bacuna is a Dutch surname. Notable people with this surname include:

- Johnsen Bacuna (born 1985), Curaçaoan footballer
- Juninho Bacuna (born 1997), Curaçaoan footballer
- Leandro Bacuna (born 1991), Curaçaoan footballer
