= Johnsen Bacuna =

Curaçaoan footballer (born 1985)

Personal information
- Date of birth: 6 August 1985 (age 41)
- Place of birth: Curaçao
- Position: Midfielder

Team information
- Current team: Berkum

Senior career*
Years	Team	Apps	(Gls)
–2007	Velocitas 1897		
2007–2008	PKC '83		
2008–2010	GVAV-Rapiditas		
2010–2011	DIO Groningen		
2012–2015	Harkemase Boys	11+	(2+)
2015–	Berkum		

International career
2008	Netherlands Antilles	2	(1)
- * Club domestic league appearances and goals

Johnsen Bacuna (born 6 August 1985) is a Curaçaoan footballer who plays as a midfielder for Berkum.

== Career ==
Bacuna started his career with Dutch fifth tier side Velocitas 1897. In 2010, he signed for DIO Groningen in the Dutch sixth tier, helping them earn promotion to the Dutch fifth tier. Before the second half of 2011–12, Bacuna signed for Dutch fourth tier club Harkemase Boys, where he suffered relegation to the Dutch fifth tier. In 2015, Bacuna signed for Berkum in the Dutch fifth tier, helping them earn promotion to the Dutch fifth tier.

== Personal life ==
He is the older brother of professional footballers Leandro Bacuna and Juninho Bacuna.
