= Yuri Rose =

Dutch football manager and former player (born 1979)

Personal information
- Full name: Yuri Alexander Rose
- Date of birth: 8 May 1979 (age 47)
- Place of birth: Purmerend, Netherlands
- Height: 1.87 m (6 ft 2 in)
- Position: Midfielder

Team information
- Current team: Ajax U17 (manager)

Youth career
- Purmersteijn
- Ajax

Senior career*
Years	Team	Apps	(Gls)
1997–2002	Volendam	95	(23)
2002–2004	Heracles Almelo	68	(35)
2004–2005	Heerenveen	19	(3)
2005–2010	Sparta Rotterdam	114	(21)
2009–2010	→ De Graafschap (loan)	30	(13)
2010–2012	De Graafschap	61	(4)
2012–2013	Cambuur	19	(0)
2013–2015	Ajax Zaterdag	24	(8)
2015	AFC	1	(0)

Managerial career
- 2015–2016: AFC (U17)
- 2016–2017: AFC (U19)
- 2017–2018: OFC Oostzaan
- 2018–2020: Ajax Zaterdag
- 2020–: Ajax (U17)
- * Club domestic league appearances and goals

Yuri Rose (born 8 May 1979) is a Dutch football manager and former player. He is currently the head coach of the Ajax under-17 team.

== Club career ==
Rose played for FC Volendam, Heracles Almelo, SC Heerenveen, Sparta Rotterdam, De Graafschap, before ending his professional career with SC Cambuur.

He then joined Ajax Zaterdag the amateur team of Ajax Amsterdam where he was active until 2015. He went on to play 1 more match after retiring for AFC. Rose trained with the club twice a week and later confirmed, that he had an agreement with AFC manager Bart Logchies, that he could always call him if it was needed.

== Coaching career ==
After retiring, Rose began as a manager for Amsterdamsche FC's U17 team and later the U19 team. In the summer of 2017, Rose became the manager of OFC Oostzaan, combining it with a role at Ajax as an individual youth coach for the U17 and U19 squad on a part-time basis.

On 30 January 2018, it was confirmed that Rose had been appointed manager of Ajax Zaterdag from the 2018–19 season on a two-year deal. In June 2020, he was appointed manager of the Ajax under-17 team.

== Honours ==
De Graafschap

- Eerste Divisie: 2009–10

Cambuur

- Eerste Divisie: 2012–13

Individual

- KNVB Cup Golden Boot: 2003–04
