= Thijs van der Meulen =

Dutch footballer (born 1980)

Personal information
- Full name: Thijs van der Meulen
- Date of birth: 17 December 1980 (age 45)
- Place of birth: Amsterdam, Netherlands
- Position: Defender

Team information
- Current team: FC Hilversum

Senior career*
Years	Team	Apps	(Gls)
2004–2005	FC Den Bosch	1	(0)
2005–2006	Kozakken Boys	x	(x)
2006–2007	FC Breukelen	x	(x)
2007–2011	FC Hilversum	2	(2)
- * Club domestic league appearances and goals

Thijs van der Meulen (born 17 December 1980) is a Dutch footballer who plays for Topklasse club FC Hilversum as a defender. He started his career at FC Den Bosch, where he made his debut against FC Twente in 2004. However, he did not play any more games for Den Bosch and moved on to play football for a number of amateur sides. He currently plays for FC Hilversum.
