= DIO Groningen =

Dutch football club

- Full name: Door Inspanning Ontspanning Groningen
- Founded: 17 May 1971
- Ground: Kardinge, Groningen
- Chairman: Simon Dokter
- Manager: Jan Willem Bijlsma
- League: Saturday Reserve Vijfde Klasse (2012–13)
- Website: http://www.diogroningen.nl/
Home colours

DIO Groningen is a football club from Groningen in the province Groningen, Netherlands.

== History ==
The Sunday section of the club played in the 2011–12 Hoofdklasse. Due to financial problems, the club withdrew from the league on 1 December 2011.

The Saturday section of DIO Groningen still exists. It played 2012–14 in the Reserve Vijfde Klasse. In 2020–2021 it played in the Reserve Vierde Klasse, after playing 2014–20 in the Vijfde Klasse.
