= VPV Purmersteijn =

Association football club in Purmerend, Netherlands

Purmersteijn
- Full name: Verenigde Purmerender Voetbalverenigingen "Purmersteijn"
- Nickname: De Leeuwen (The Lions)
- Founded: 5 May 1907; 119 years ago
- Ground: Sportpark Purmersteijn, Purmerend
- Chairman: Jan Groenhart
- Manager: Berry Smit
- League: Derde Divisie
- 2025–26: Vierde Divisie A, 1st of 16 (promoted)
- Website: purmersteijn.eu
Home colours

Verenigde Purmerender Voetbalverenigingen "Purmersteijn", known as VPV Purmersteijn, is a football club based in Purmerend, North Holland, Netherlands. Currently members of the Derde Divisie, the fourth tier of the Dutch football league system, they play their home matches at Sportpark Purmersteijn. The club's colours are white and blue.

== History ==
Purmersteijn was founded on 5 May 1907 in Purmerend, making it one of the oldest football clubs in the province of North Holland. The club's name was proposed by founding member Ko Lankelma, who suggested "Purmersteijn" in reference to the historic Slot Purmersteijn, a former landmark of the city. Intended to reflect local heritage, the name provided the club with a clear cultural and geographic identity. The club played its first official match on 29 September 1907 against Sparta Edam and achieved early success with a regional championship in 1910. During the 1920s, the club secured additional lower-division titles, including league championships in 1920 and 1923, which enabled upward movement in the Dutch amateur football system. However, the club's fortunes varied, and by the 1930s it experienced relegations as well, winning the Vierde Klasse title in 1932 before rebuilding efforts resumed in the post-war years.

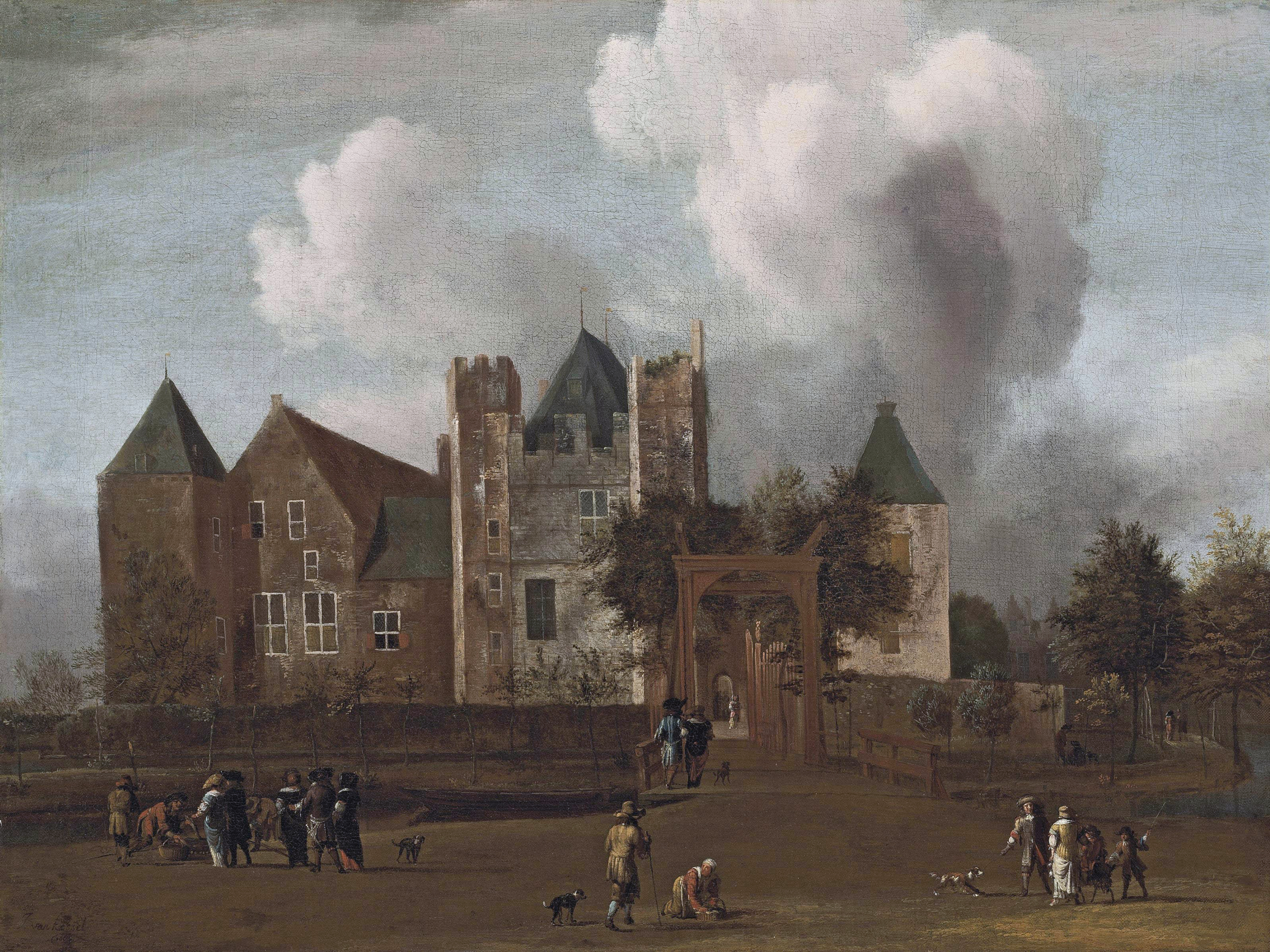
A painting of Slot Purmersteijn in Purmerend, the castle that gave VPV Purmersteijn its name.

In January 1946, Purmersteijn merged with local club Sandow, adopting the name VPV Purmersteijn—short for Verenigde Purmerender Voetbalverenigingen—to reflect the consolidation of football organisations in the city. The merger marked the start of a more stable period, culminating in the club's greatest success during the 1960s.

In 1964, Purmersteijn won the championship of the KNVB Eerste Klasse (West I), which at the time represented the highest level of amateur football in the Netherlands. The title qualified the club for the national Sunday amateur championship, where it placed sixth among the regional winners. This period also saw several notable players emerge from the club, including Martin Koeman, who later played professionally for SC Heerenveen and FC Groningen, and whose sons Ronald and Erwin Koeman became international players. Cees de Wolf also began his career at Purmersteijn before joining Ajax, while Yuri Rose—later active at Heracles Almelo, Sparta Rotterdam, and FC Volendam—was another product of the club's youth ranks.

Following the 1964 title, Purmersteijn was unable to maintain top-tier amateur status. By the late 1960s, the club had been relegated from the Eerste Klasse and spent subsequent decades fluctuating between the Tweede and Derde Klasse. While remaining a consistent presence in regional football, it did not claim further major titles during the remainder of the 20th century.

In the early 2000s, Purmersteijn began to recover competitively. The club achieved promotion to the Eerste Klasse in 2005 and again in 2009, each time winning its Tweede Klasse section following short periods of relegation. These developments laid the foundation for a historic milestone in 2011. That year, Purmersteijn won a promotion play-off in June against Achilles '12 to reach the Hoofdklasse—then the second-highest level of amateur football in the country. The 2–0 win, played in Zeist, secured promotion through an additional berth made available after the bankruptcy of RBC Roosendaal. It marked the first time a club from Purmerend had reached the Hoofdklasse. The achievement was widely celebrated in the local community.

The club's stay in the division was short-lived. Purmersteijn endured a difficult 2011–12 Hoofdklasse season and was relegated after one year. A further drop to the Tweede Klasse followed for the 2013–14 season. However, under head coach Martin van Ophuijen, the club won the Tweede Klasse A championship that same year, earning immediate promotion back to the Eerste Klasse.

Purmersteijn continued its upward trajectory in the 2016–17 season, winning the Sunday Eerste Klasse A title with a significant points margin. The championship secured direct promotion back to the Hoofdklasse. That same season, the club also won the KNVB District Cup (West I), defeating ADO '20 in the final on penalties. The double marked the first time in the club's history it had claimed both league and district cup honours in a single season.

From 2017 onward, Purmersteijn became a regular competitor in the Hoofdklasse. In 2022, the division was restructured and rebranded as the Vierde Divisie as part of a broader KNVB league system reform. The club remained stable in the national amateur tiers and registered mid-table to upper-table finishes in the seasons that followed. During the 2019–20 season, Purmersteijn was temporarily placed in the Saturday Hoofdklasse B due to a one-off realignment of teams. The season was later suspended due to the COVID-19 pandemic, with no promotion or relegation enacted. The club returned to its regular Sunday competition the following year.

In the 2022–23 season, Purmersteijn achieved a third-place finish in the Sunday Vierde Divisie A group, narrowly missing out on promotion but reinforcing its position as one of the more competitive amateur sides in the division.

== Colours and crest ==
Purmersteijn's circular crest features a stylised football background and a central shield displaying three silver eggen (also called "weerhaken" or harrows). These symbols are taken from the coat of arms of the city of Purmerend, tracing back to Willem Eggert, the medieval lord of Purmerend, who used them to signify authority and feudal rights.

While the two heraldic lions from the city's full coat of arms—formalised in 1816—are not shown in the club's logo, they are reflected in the club's nickname: De Leeuwen ("The Lions").

== Managers ==
From	To	Manager
1907	1979	
1979	1983	Dolf van Dijk
1983	1985	Egbert Koghee
1985	1987	Co Horn
1987	1991	Henk Medik
1991	1994	John Stevens
1994	1997	Henk Braspenning
1997	1998	Cees Roubos
1998	1999	Ben Jensen
1999	2000	Jan Boes

From	To	Manager
2000	2005	Peter de Graaf
2005	2007	Rowdy Bakker
2007	2011	Peter de Graaf
2011	2012	Pim Kaagman
2012	2013	Constantijn Schouten
2013	2021	Martin van Ophuizen
2021	2024	Mo El Bouziani
2024	2024	Kiri Kalaitzis
2025	2025	Cor ten Bosch
2025	Present	Berry Smit

== Honours ==
Honour	Year(s)
Eerste Klasse; West I champions	1963–64, 2016–17
Tweede Klasse	1910, 1961–62, 2004–05, 2008–09, 2013–14
Derde Klasse	1920, 1923, 1956–57
Vierde Klasse	1932, 1951–52
KNVB District Cup; West I winner	2006–07
