= Voorschoten '97 =

Dutch athletics club

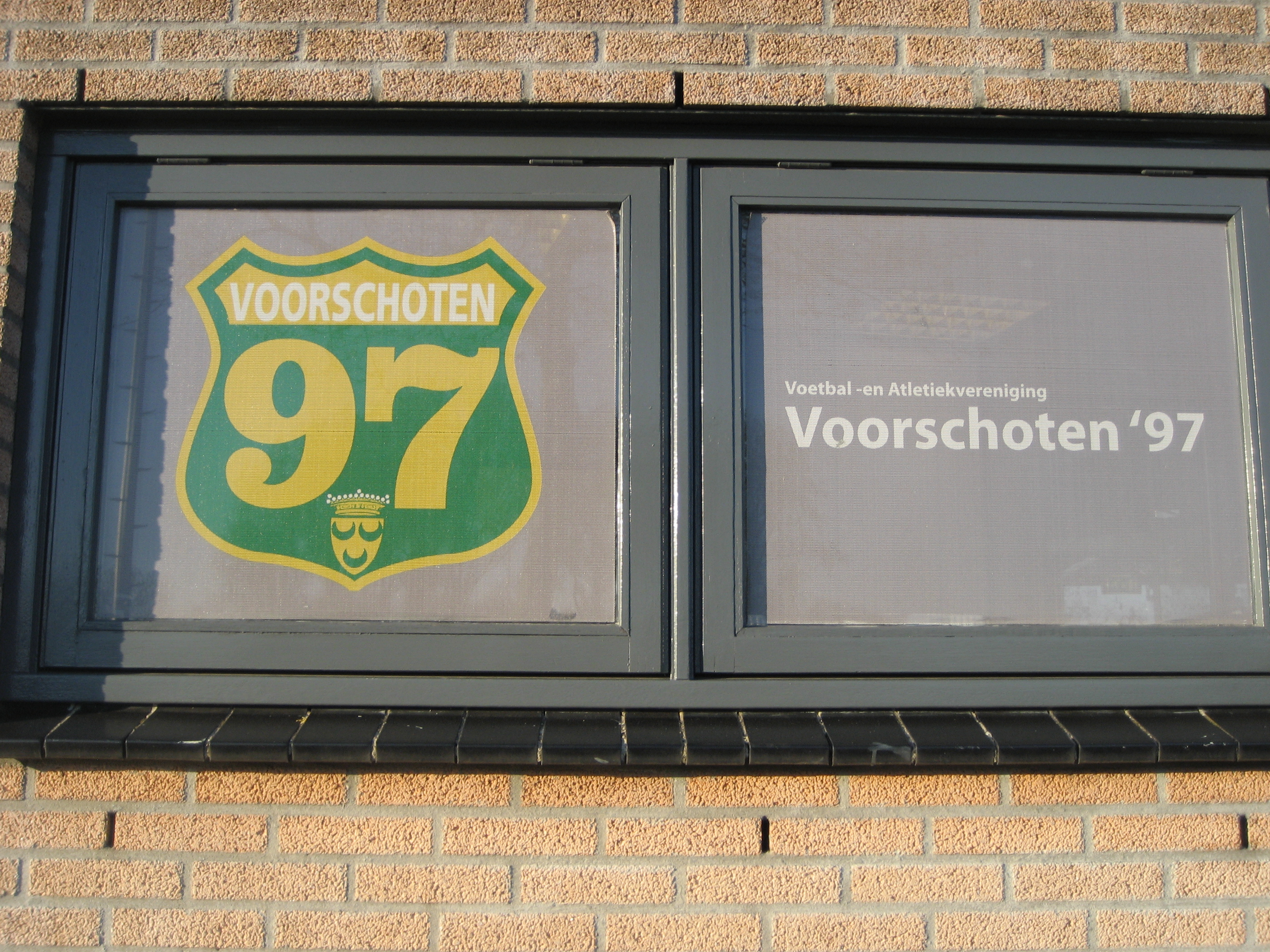
- Full name: Voetbal- en Atletiekvereniging Voorschoten '97
- Nickname: V'97
- Founded: 1997
- Ground: Sportpark Adegeest; Voorschoten
- Capacity: John Kriek-tribune 135+
- Manager: Robert Escudero
- League: Eerste Klasse Saturday B (2019–20)
Home colours

Voorschoten '97 is a football and athletics club in Voorschoten, Netherlands.

== History ==
Voorschoten '97 was founded on 1 July 1997 after a fusion of the football clubs: S.V Voorschoten, S.V.L.V and Randstad Sport.

=== Early history ===
V'97 can find its roots in 1925 when Voorschoten got its first official club, V.V.L. on 15 December 1925. Rouwcoop followed in 1932 and they shared De Burgemeester vd Hoeven Sportpark. V.V.L became known as S.V.L.V. Whilst Rouwcoop became Randstad Sport respectively. Both these clubs would start senior 'Saturday' sides. There was some opposition because S.V.L.V had always been a 'Sunday' playing club. In 1974 Randstad Sport moved to Sportpark Adegeest and there became intensive amalgamation talks of the two clubs, however time after time these talks broke down.

The 'Saturday' of Randstad Sport split as S.V Voorschoten in 1982. In 1993 S.V.L.V were promoted for the first time in their history to the third division of the KNVB.

=== Amalgamation ===
Forced by economic emergencies to bring their strength together, but also encouraged by the council of Voorschoten, the 3 clubs came together in agreement. On the first of July 1996 Randstad Sport and S.V.L.V amalgamated. And exactly a year later, on 1 July 1997, S.V Voorschoten joined the party. After 72-years Voorschoten would finally have a single club once more.

=== 1997 - Onwards ===
Roughly 1,500 members and 300 athletes, count towards the green-yellow family. The club is one of the biggest in the region. Notably the Voorschoten Club has had a team from professional football visit Sportpark Adegeest: FC Utrecht (1997), ADO Den Haag (1998 en 2003), Feyenoord (1998, 2001, 2003, 2005, 2007 and 2010), NAC Breda (2002), Excelsior (2002) en Willem II (2003).

Next to this, a co-operative relationship has been formed with Feyenoord Rotterdam. Voorschoten '97 and the Rotterdammers regularly play friendly matches. Most famously in 2007 when Feyenoord first showed off its new signings of: Giovanni van Bronckhorst, Roy Makaay, Tim de Cler, Kevin Hofland and Denny Landzaat all unofficially debuting for Feyenoord at Sportpark Adegeest. The match was sold out quickly by roughly 5,000 fans in attendance.

In the season of 2009/10 the District Cup West II was captured meaning Voorschoten'97 could take part in the Landelijke Beker, for amateurs and the KNVB Beker 2010/11 for professionals. In the Landelijke Beker, Voorschoten was eliminated in the quarterfinals by sv Deurne. Voorschoten '97 managed to reach the 3rd round of the KNVB Beker before being knocked out by vv Noordwijk.

== Colours ==
The club colours are yellow and green. The shirt has yellow and green stripes, shorts are green whilst the socks are white with green-yellow piping.

== Home ground ==
The football teams of Voorschoten '97 have played their home matches since foundation at Sportpark Adegeest on 6 Weddeloop, Voorschoten. The sportsground counts 6 full fields and one junior-sized field. In the summer of 2008 three fields were laid with artificial turf. Overseeing the main field is the John Kriek-tribune, it holds seating for 135 supporters and is named after the former chairman of the club.

== First team ==
In the 2010–2011 season, the first Saturday side played in the "Hoofdklasse A", the second from top level of amateur football. The Sunday 1 side plays in the "Derde klasse" of Dutch amateur Football.

The headtrainer of Zaterdag 1 is Robert Escudero (as of January 2025). Hein van Heek was headtrainer of Voorschoten '97 from 2009 to 2012.

== Youth teams ==
The club counts the following youth teams: F 14, E 17, D 13, B 7, A 5
