= VV Papendrecht =

Dutch football club

VV Papendrecht (founded 1 August 1920) is an association football club from Papendrecht, Netherlands. In 2019–20, its first squad plays in Eerste Klasse after it promoted from the Tweede Klasse through playoffs.

== History ==
During three periods, VV Papendrecht has played in the Hoofdklasse. Papendrecht played in the KNVB Cups of 1934–35, 1985–86, 1994–95, and 2008–09. Johan Sturrus is the manager since 2018.
