= RKVV Westlandia =

Dutch football club

- Full name: Rooms-Katholieke Voetbalvereniging Westlandia
- Founded: 14 November 1922
- Ground: De Hoge Bomen, Naaldwijk
- Capacity: 2,000
- Chairman: Ton van Marrewijk
- Manager: Kevin van Dijk
- League: Vierde Divisie
- Website: www.rkvv-westlandia.nl
Home colours

RKVV Westlandia is a football club from Naaldwijk, Netherlands. In the 2025–26 season, the Sunday male first squad Westlandia is competing in the Vierde Divisie (fifth tier).

== History ==
The Sunday first team won a section championship at the 2008–09 Hoofdklasse A. At that time, the Hoofdklasse was the highest tier of Dutch amateur football.

The Saturday first squad has been making fast progress. It started playing in 2004–05 in the Vijfde Klasse. That season it promoted from 5th position. In 2008 it promoted from the Vierde Klasse to the Derde Klasse from 2nd position. In 2012 it promoted to the Tweede Klasse after a section championship. In 2016 it promoted again to the Eerste Klasse, from the runner-up position.
