= SV Zwaluwen Wierden =

Dutch football club

SVZW
- Full name: Sport Vereniging Zwaluwen Wierden
- Founded: 23 September 1948; 77 years ago
- Ground: Sportpark Het Lageveld; Wierden, Netherlands
- Capacity: 3,000
- Chairman: Jan Erik ter Avest
- Manager: Erik Assink
- League: Derde Divisie
- 2025–26: Vierde Divisie D, 1st of 16 (promoted)
Home colours	Away colours

Sport Vereniging Zwaluwen Wierden is a football club from Wierden, Netherlands.

Founded on 23 September 1948, the club competes in the Derde Divisie.
