= DETO Twenterand =

Association football club in Vriezenveen, Netherlands

DETO
- Full name: Voetbalvereniging 'Door Eendracht Tot Overwinning' Vriezenveen
- Founded: 1 July 1948; 78 years ago
- Ground: Sportpark Het Midden (DETO); Vriezenveen, Netherlands
- Capacity: 4,000
- Chairman: Derby Krommendijk
- Manager: Mark Looms
- League: Vierde Divisie
- 2023–24: Saturday Vierde Divisie D, 10th of 16
Home colours

DETO is a Dutch amateur association football club from Vriezenveen. They are currently playing in the Vierde Divisie, the third tier of amateur football in the Netherlands and the fifth tier overall. Traditional colours are red and black.

== See also ==
- Category:DETO Twenterand players
