= SV Babberich =

Dutch football club

- Full name: Sportvereniging Babberich
- Founded: 1930
- Ground: Sportpark; De Buitenboom
- League: Vijfde Klasse (2023–24)
Home colours	Away colours

Sportvereniging Babberich is a Dutch football club based in Babberich which was founded in 1930. It competes in the Vijfde Klasse since 2017.

== History ==
Located in a small village, Babberich managed to play in the Hoofdklasse from 1988 to 2012 and has won the National KNVB Amateur Cup in 1997. After local sponsors withdrew their financial support, the club fell down to the lower regions of the Dutch football pyramid.
