= SV ARC =

Association football club in Alphen aan den Rijn, Netherlands

ARC
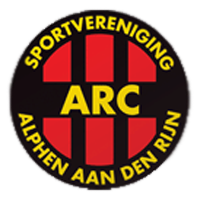
- Full name: Alphense Racing Club
- Founded: 22 February 1927; 98 years ago
- Ground: Zegersloot; Alphen aan den Rijn
- Capacity: 9,000
- Chairman: Irma Ligtvoet
- Manager: Mark Evers
- League: Vierde Divisie
- 2022–23: Saturday Vierde Divisie A, 5th of 16
Home colours	Away colours

ARC (Alphense Racing Club) is a football club based in Alphen aan de Rijn, Netherlands. Founded in 1927, they are currently members of the Vierde Divisie, the fifth tier of the Dutch football league system. They play their home matches at Zegersloot. ARC played several times in the national KNVB Cup.

== History ==
ARC was established on 22 February 1927.

=== 1990s: Eerste Klasse era ===
In the 1990s ARC played mostly in the Eerste Klasse. It won the title in the Saturday Hoofdklasse A division in 1998. That same year, it agreed with the neighboring football clubs not to offer improved contracts to each other's players.

In the national cup of 1998–99 and 1999–00 ARC competed in the group rounds but failed to classify for the finals.

=== 2000s: Hoofdklasse era ===
In the 2000s ARC played mostly in the Hoofdklasse.

=== 2010s: To Topklasse and back to Eerste Klasse ===
In the 2010–11 KNVB Cup ARC beat SV Venray 4–0. In the next round it lost against Heracles Almelo, 3–0. In the 2011–12 national cup it beat Quick '20 6–2. In the next round it lost against MVV Maastricht, 8–0.

In 2010 the club was a serious candidate for Topklasse even though it had finished the season only in the position in the Hoofdklasse. The opportunity was there because the Topklasse was founded that year and would fill with Hoofdklasse teams, among others. Still the decisive game against Be Quick 1887 finished in 1–1 also after extra time. ARC finally made it in through penalties.

Subsequently, ARC played two years in the Topklasse. It was never a natural fit. Its best achievement was an 11th position in 2011. In 2012 it ended 16th out of 16 and relegated.

In 2013 relegated once more, this time from the 12th slot in the Hoofdklasse. Since, it competes successfully in the Eerste Klasse. Its high was 2nd in 2018 and its low was 11th in 2017.
