= FC Lisse =

Dutch football club

- Full name: Fusie Club Lisse
- Founded: 17 March 1981; 44 years ago
- Ground: Ter Specke, Lisse
- Capacity: 4,000
- Chairman: Kee-Hoei Tan
- Manager: Sjaak Polak
- League: Derde Divisie
- 2024–25: Derde Divisie B, 6th of 18
| Home colours | Away colours |

FC Lisse is a Dutch football club from Lisse, founded in 1981. It currently plays in the Derde Divisie.

== History ==
The history of FC Lisse is linked to its Catholic religion, the first version of a football club being formed in 1911 by a local Catholic priest, called Lissese Voetbal Vereniging, which was later renamed Lisse Racing Club. In 1921 a separate team, RKVV Lisse, was formed. In 1942 Lisse RC was dissolved, and after World War Two another club, Lisser Boys, was formed. In 1968 an unsuccessful attempt was made to merge RKVV Lisse (later called Sportclub Lisse) and Lisser Boys, but on 17 March 1981 the teams were merged under the name FC Lisse.

The club was automatically promoted to Topklasse in 2009–10, which was introduced as highest amateur level in the Netherlands. After reintroduction of the Tweede Divisie in 2016–17 above the Topklasse, FC Lisse didn't qualify for the new top amateur championship. A year later, it promoted to the Tweede Divisie, but relegated after just one season. In 2022, FC Lisse entered the Tweede Divisie again by winning the Derde Divisie (new name of the Topklasse).

After a 12th placed finish in the 2022–23 season, Lisse finished last in the following season and were relegated back to the Derde Divisie.

In the 2024–25 KNVB Cup first round, Lisse hosted Eredivisie club FC Utrecht, where they narrowly lost 2–1.

== Results ==
- 1989–90: 10th place
- 1990–91: 9th place
- 1991–92: 6th place
- 1992–93: 4th place
- 1993–94: 2nd place
- 1994–95: 2nd place
- 1995–96: 2nd place
- 1996–97: Champions
- 1997–98: 3rd place
- 1998–99: 5th place
- 1999-00: 12th place
- 2000–01: Champions, Dutch Saturdays Champions Amateur Clubs
- 2001–02: 11th place
- 2002–03: 9th place
- 2003–04: 2nd place
- 2004–05: 5th place
- 2005–06: 2nd place
- 2006–07: 2nd place
- 2007–08: 1st place Saturday A, overall champions
- 2008–09: 8th place
- 2009–10: 4th place, promoted to Topklasse
- 2010–11: 11th place
- 2011–12: 11th place
- 2012–13: 6th place
- 2013–14: 8th place
- 2014–15: 11th place
- 2015–16: 15th place
- 2016–17: 2nd place, promoted to Tweede Divisie
- 2017–18: 15th place, relegated to Derde Divisie
- 2018–19: 10th place
- 2019–20: Competition cancelled due to COVID-pandemic
- 2020–21: Competition cancelled due to COVID-pandemic
- 2021–22: 1st place, promoted to Tweede Divisie
- 2022–23: 12th place
- 2023–24: 16th place
