= FC Hilversum =

Dutch football club

- Full name: FC Hilversum
- Founded: 1906 (as Voorwaarts)
- Ground: Sportpark Crailoo; Hilversum
- Capacity: N/A
- Chairman: Dirk Reijers
- Manager: Karel Bonsink
- League: Topklasse
- 2009–10: Hoofdklasse Sunday A, 3rd
Home colours	Away colours

FC Hilversum is a football club from Hilversum, Netherlands. The club was founded in 1906 as Voorwaarts and is currently playing in the Topklasse, the highest tier of amateur football in the Netherlands. It will play in the inaugural season of the newly formed Dutch third tier Topklasse in 2010–11.

== Current squad ==
Note: Flags indicate national team as defined under FIFA eligibility rules; some limited exceptions apply. Players may hold more than one non-FIFA nationality.

No.	Pos.	Nation	Player
—	GK	NED	Rob Hilbers
—	GK	NED	Tim van Loon
—	GK	NED	Daan van Vaal
—	DF	NED	Richard Dirven
—	DF	NED	John Hityahubessy
—	DF	NED	Burak Dudukcu
—	DF	NED	Stanley Jongekind
—	DF	NED	Thijs van der Meulen
—	DF	NED	Jasper van de Heuvel
—	DF	NED	Dion Glumac
—	MF	NED	Tony Bonsink (captain)
—	MF	NED	Maurice Eijpe
—	MF	NED	Jordy Fernhout

No.	Pos.	Nation	Player
—	MF	NED	Jermaine Sweet
—	MF	NED	Jerraynell van der Pol
—	MF	NED	Michiel Foppen
—	MF	NED	Steffan Vlietstra
—	MF	NED	Pim Koppel
—	FW	NED	Özgun Besir
—	FW	NED	Quintin Bhagwandin
—	FW	NED	Tom Clobus
—	FW	NED	Sercan Ozturk
—	FW	NED	Ricardo Ris
—	FW	NED	Gregory Kuster
—	FW	NED	Clayton Karsari
