= WHC Wezep =

Dutch football club

- Full name: Wezep Hattemerbroek Combination
- Founded: 1 October 1930
- Ground: Mulderssingel
- Capacity: 500
- League: Eerste Klasse Saturday D (2019–20)
- Website: http://www.whc-wezep.nl/
Home colours

Wezep Hattemerbroek Combination, commonly known as WHC Wezep, is a football club from the municipality of Oldebroek, Netherlands. The club plays home games at Mulderssingel, where WHC has six playing fields and three training fields. The grandstand has 500 seats. WHC has blue and white team colors. The club is best known for a 14–1 defeat to Ajax Amsterdam in the KNVB Cup 2009–10 season.

== History ==
=== 1930s–1940s ===
On 1 October 1930, the Hattemerbroek Football Association (HVV) was founded in Bakery Merchant to Hattemerbroek. After several years of participation in the North Central Football Association (NCVB), HVV won its first championship in 1938. This was followed with a second championship in 1939, with the team remaining undefeated throughout the season. The rise to prominence of HVV was halted in 1940 by the German invasion of the Netherlands. The competition was suspended.

During the war years football mostly stopped. After liberation, HVV Wezeper Boys resumed competitive football. The KNVB did not accept Wezeper Boys and advised that they merge with the local HVV. A new name for the merged club was adopted: Wezep Hattemerbroek Combination (WHC).

In the 1946–1947 season, WHC entered the newly created fourth division of the KNVB, the highest level in the Eastern Division. WHC achieved success in 1949 at the expense of Quick Boys (champions of the Saturday amateur league) and qualified for the cup final. In Baarn, WHC lost 2–1 to the Amsterdam side AMVJ. After the match, the referee and his assistants fled amid complaints about the officiating. A year later, some 5,000 spectators saw WHC win 4–2 against Nunspeet in 't Harde, achieving its first championship under the new name.

=== 1950s–1960s ===
In the late 1950s, Klouwenberg Wim Klein, WHC's first official coach, joined the club along with some young talent. Klouwenberg Klein was instrumental in the club achieving their greatest success up to that point.

From 1964 to 1970, WHC won five division championships. The 1968 championship included a deciding match against Go Ahead Kampen Zwolle (a 2–1 victory). This game was watched by 11,500 spectators, a number unheard of in a game between amateur clubs.

=== 1970s ===
In 1970, WHC won an eighth title, remaining undefeated for the entire season. The team had a good run in the Saturday Press Wezenaar league, but failed to with the championship.

For five seasons during the 1970s, WHC competed unsuccessfully for the Saturday league title, finishing runners up on four occasions. During that period, WHC became known nationally as a Saturday football club.

In 1971, WHC lost to Veenendaal Black White '28 champions in the Saturday amateur football cup final. Several players from WHC participated in the Dutch national Saturday team.

=== 1980s–1990s ===
In 1980 in a critical match in Nunspeet, watched by 5,000 spectators, WHC beat SDCP 5–0 to avoid relegation. In 1982 WHC was relegated for the first time in their 52-year history. Six years later, WHC returned to the highest level. In 1988, a ninth division championship was won and a 5–1 victory over FC Meppel ensured a return to the top level.

In 1992, WHC again narrowly avoided relegation, before relegation struck again in 1996. The club was promoted gain, however, after a 5–1 win over ASC, which gave them a tenth divisional championship.

=== 2000s–2010s ===
The club scored three third places and time titles in 2000, 2004 and 2005. After 30 appearances in the first and / or second league since 1970, the club was one of the most experienced at the highest level of amateur Saturday football.
