= Zwaluwen '30 =

Dutch football club

Zwaluwen 1930
- Full name: Zwaluwen 1930
- Founded: 1930
- Ground: Sportcomplex Middelweg; Hoorn, Netherlands
- Capacity: 1500
- League: Tweede Klasse Saturday (2023–24)
Home colours	Away colours

Zwaluwen 1930 is a football club from Hoorn, Netherlands. The club was founded in 1930. Zwaluwen is competing in the Eerste Klasse, after one continuous run in the Hoofdklasse, from 2007 through 2012.

In Fall 2011 Zwaluwen '30 lost in the second round of the national cup to GVVV.

== Managers ==
- (Netherlands) (Indonesia) Miswanto Da Harrick (1996–1999)

== Notable former players ==
- Sontje Hansen
