= VV DESK =

Dutch football club

DESK
- Full name: Voetbalvereniging Door Eendracht Sterk Kaatsheuvel
- Founded: 29 May 1930
- Ground: Eikendijk, Kaatsheuvel
- League: Derde Klasse Saturday (2023–24)
- Website: http://www.vvdesk.nl/
Home colours

VV DESK is a football club from Kaatsheuvel, Netherlands. DESK plays in the Derde Klasse Saturday (eighth tier) in the 2023–24 season.

DESK won the national KNVB Amateur Cup for Sunday clubs in 1980.
