= VV Nunspeet =

Dutch football club

- Full name: Voetbalvereniging Nunspeet
- Founded: 1 September 1924
- Ground: De Wiltsangh, Nunspeet
- Chairman: Kees Heiwegen
- Manager: Jan van de Berg
- League: Eerste Klasse Saturday D (2019–20)
- Website: http://www.vvnunspeet.nl/
Home colours

VV Nunspeet is a football club from Nunspeet, Netherlands. Nunspeet plays in the 2017–18 Eerste Klasse.
