= HVV Hollandia =

Association football club in Hoorn, Netherlands

Hollandia
- Full name: Hoornse Voetbalvereniging Hollandia
- Founded: 1 September 1898; 128 years ago
- Ground: Juliana Sportpark; Hoorn
- Capacity: 2,500
- Chairman: Gerard Hubers
- Manager: Lars Keppel
- League: Derde Divisie
- 2025–26: Vierde Divisie A, 3rd of 16 (promoted via play-offs)
Home colours

Hoornse Voetbalvereniging Hollandia, simply known as HVV Hollandia, is a football club based in Hoorn, North Holland, Netherlands. Currently members of the Derde Divisie, the fourth tier of the Dutch football league system, the club was established in 1898, and the first team play their home matches at the 2,500-capacity Juliana Sportpark. The club's colours are red, white and black.

The club was founded on 1 September 1898 and has played exclusively at amateur level in all its history. Hollandia was part of the Hoofdklasse league since 1991, and completed the 2009–10 season with a sixth place in the Sunday A group, then winning promotion to the newly established Topklasse league for the inaugural 2010–11 season through playoffs.
