= Vierde Divisie =

- Organising body: KNVB
- Founded: 1974 (Sunday); 1996 (Saturday)
- Country: Netherlands
- Confederation: UEFA
- Number of clubs: 64 in four groups of 16
- Level on pyramid: 5
- Promotion to: Derde Divisie
- Relegation to: Eerste Klasse
- Domestic cup: KNVB Cup
- Current: 2026–27

The Vierde Divisie (Dutch pronunciation: [ˈviːrdə diˈvisi], "Fourth Division"), known until 2022 as the Hoofdklasse (Dutch pronunciation: [ˈɦoːftklɑsə]), is the fifth tier of football in the Netherlands and the third-highest level of the amateur game. It is administered by the KNVB and is contested by 64 clubs in four regional groups of sixteen, lettered A to D.

The competition was founded in 1974 as the highest amateur division in the country, sitting immediately below the professional Eredivisie and Eerste Divisie. It has been displaced downwards twice, by the creation of the Topklasse in 2010 and by the reintroduction of the Tweede Divisie in 2016, and was renamed in 2022.

For most of its history the division was split into separate Saturday and Sunday competitions, a survival of the pillarisation of Dutch society. That separation was abolished before the 2023–24 season, since when clubs have been grouped by region instead.

== History ==
=== Foundation and the Saturday–Sunday divide ===
The Hoofdklasse was established in 1974 as the top amateur competition of the KNVB, drawing the 42 strongest sides from the six sections of the Eerste Klasse. It was created for Sunday clubs only. Saturday clubs continued to decide their champion within the Eerste Klasse until a Saturday Hoofdklasse was added in 1996. (Note: This distinction matters for the honours below. Saturday winners before 1996–97 were champions of the Eerste Klasse, not of the Hoofdklasse.)

The split reflected pillarisation (Dutch: verzuiling), the segregation of Dutch social life along confessional lines. Saturday clubs were predominantly Protestant and did not play on Sundays; Sunday clubs were generally Catholic or working-class, their players being at work on Saturdays. Pillarisation itself faded during the 1960s and 1970s, but the football structure it produced outlasted it by half a century.

From 1974 each section ran three national groups, whose winners played off for a Saturday and a Sunday title. The two national champions then met to decide the overall Hoofdklasse championship. That final round was superseded in 2010, when the Topklasse became the amateur championship, and the overall title was abolished altogether in 2016.

=== Displacement, 2010 and 2016 ===
The introduction of the Topklasse in 2010 inserted a division above the Hoofdklasse, making it the second amateur level and the fourth tier. From 2010–11 the winners of the three groups in each section were promoted into the two Topklasse groups.

The reintroduction of the Tweede Divisie in 2016 pushed it down again, to the third amateur level and the fifth tier, the Topklasse being renamed the Derde Divisie at the same time. Groups were enlarged from fourteen clubs to sixteen and reduced from three per section to two, giving four groups and four promoted champions. The transitional 2015–16 season used play-offs, with period winners meeting the fifteenth-placed club of the Topklasse, and the twelfth and thirteenth placed meeting the period winners of the Eerste Klasse.

=== Renaming and the end of the split ===
The KNVB members' council voted in June 2022 to rename the competition the Vierde Divisie and to abolish the Saturday–Sunday separation from 2023–24. Since then all 64 clubs have been allocated regionally rather than by matchday. Clubs indicate before the season whether they wish to play at home on a Saturday or a Sunday; clubs that observe Sunday on principle retain the right to play on Saturdays in all cases. In practice most fixtures are played on Saturday afternoons, with matches between two Sunday clubs usually taking place on the Sunday.

Before the current system, Hoofdklasse clubs could only reach professional football by applying for a licence for the Eerste Divisie. The last to do so were AGOVV Apeldoorn in 2003 and FC Omniworld in 2005.

== Format ==
Each of the four groups plays a 30-match season. The four group champions are promoted to the Derde Divisie. The three period champions of each group enter play-offs alongside the fifteenth and sixteenth-placed clubs of Derde Divisie A and B, contesting two further places at the higher level. Clubs finishing fifteenth and sixteenth are relegated directly to the Eerste Klasse, while those finishing thirteenth and fourteenth play off against Eerste Klasse period champions to retain their places.

== Hoofdklasse champions since 1975 ==
Season	Saturday champion	Sunday champion	National champion
1974–75	Spijkenisse	FC Emmen	Spijkenisse
1975–76	IJsselmeervogels	Limburgia	IJsselmeervogels
1976–77	IJsselmeervogels	Rheden	IJsselmeervogels
1977–78	ACV	Hoogeveen	ACV
1978–79	DOVO	Rohda Raalte	Rohda Raalte
1979–80	Noordwijk	Xerxes	Noordwijk
1980–81	DOS Kampen	RKC Waalwijk	RKC Waalwijk
1981–82	IJsselmeervogels	RKC Waalwijk	RKC Waalwijk
1982–83	IJsselmeervogels	DHC Delft	IJsselmeervogels
1983–84	IJsselmeervogels	Geldrop	Geldrop
1984–85	Spakenburg	DHC Delft	Spakenburg
1985–86	ACV	SV TOP	ACV
1986–87	ACV	Geldrop	Geldrop
1987–88	DOS Kampen	De Treffers	DOS Kampen
1988–89	Heerjansdam	RCH	RCH
1989–90	Rijnsburgse Boys	Geldrop	Geldrop
1990–91	Quick Boys	De Treffers	De Treffers
1991–92	Quick Boys	Rheden	Quick Boys
1992–93	Katwijk	Holland	Katwijk
1993–94	Katwijk	STEVO	Katwijk
1994–95	IJsselmeervogels	Holland	IJsselmeervogels
1995–96	Scheveningen	Baronie	Scheveningen
1996–97	VVOG	Baronie	Baronie
1997–98	IJsselmeervogels	De Treffers	De Treffers
1998–99	IJsselmeervogels	HSC '21	HSC '21
1999–2000	Katwijk	Achilles 1894	Katwijk
2000–01	Lisse	Baronie	Baronie
2001–02	Huizen	AGOVV	AGOVV
2002–03	Huizen	Türkiyemspor	Huizen
2003–04	Quick Boys	HSC '21	Quick Boys
2004–05	ASWH	Argon	ASWH
2005–06	IJsselmeervogels	Türkiyemspor	IJsselmeervogels
2006–07	IJsselmeervogels	Argon	Argon
2007–08	Lisse	Hollandia	Lisse
2008–09	Rijnsburgse Boys	WKE	WKE
2009–10	IJsselmeervogels	Gemert	IJsselmeervogels
2010–11	Noordwijk, GVVV, SVZW	HBS Craeyenhout, UNA, HSC '21	Contested in the Topklasse until 2016
2011–12	Jodan Boys, Scheveningen, DETO	ADO '20, Gemert, Sneek Wit Zwart	Contested in the Topklasse until 2016
2012–13	Ter Leede, Excelsior Maassluis, ONS Sneek	Leonidas, UNA, Be Quick 1887	Contested in the Topklasse until 2016
2013–14	Sparta Nijkerk, Hoek, Genemuiden	Koninklijke HFC, Rosmalen, Hercules	Contested in the Topklasse until 2016
2014–15	SteDoCo, Katwijk, DVS '33	Magreb '90, TEC, Sneek Wit Zwart	Contested in the Topklasse until 2016
2015–16	ODIN '59, Quick Boys, Harkemase Boys	Westlandia, Dongen, Juliana '31	Contested in the Topklasse until 2016

Season	Saturday champion	Sunday champion
2016–17	Spijkenisse, ACV	ADO '20, Blauw Geel '38
2017–18	Noordwijk, Eemdijk	SJC, Oss '20
2018–19	Ter Leede, Excelsior '31	DEM, Groene Ster
2019–20	No champions	
2020–21	No champions	
2021–22	FC Rijnvogels, Urk	TOGB, Baronie
2022–23	Kloetinge, Eemdijk	Hoogeveen, Meerssen

=== Since 2023–24 ===
Following the abolition of the Saturday–Sunday split, four regional groups are contested.

Season	A	B	C	D
2023–24	Ajax	ASWH	GOES	Excelsior '31
2024–25	Scherpenzeel	Zwaluwen	UDI '19	Hoogeveen
2025–26	Purmersteijn	Poortugaal	Achilles Veen	SVZW Wierden

=== Saturday titles since 1975 ===
#	Clubs
11	IJsselmeervogels
4	ACV, Quick Boys, Katwijk
3	Noordwijk
2	Spijkenisse, DOS Kampen, Rijnsburgse Boys, Scheveningen, Lisse, Huizen, Ter Leede, Eemdijk
1	DOVO, Spakenburg, Heerjansdam, VVOG, ASWH, GVVV, SVZW, Jodan Boys, DETO, Excelsior Maassluis, ONS Sneek, Sparta Nijkerk, Hoek, Genemuiden, SteDoCo, DVS '33, ODIN '59, Harkemase Boys, Excelsior '31, FC Rijnvogels, Urk, Kloetinge

=== Sunday titles since 1975 ===
#	Clubs
4	Baronie
3	Geldrop, De Treffers, HSC '21
2	Rheden, RKC Waalwijk, DHC Delft, Holland, Türkiyemspor, Argon, Gemert, UNA, ADO '20, Sneek Wit Zwart, Hoogeveen
1	FC Emmen, Limburgia, Rohda Raalte, Xerxes, SV TOP, RCH, STEVO, Achilles 1894, AGOVV, Hollandia, WKE, HBS Craeyenhout, Leonidas, Be Quick 1887, Koninklijke HFC, Rosmalen, Hercules, Magreb '90, TEC, Westlandia, Dongen, Juliana '31, Blauw Geel '38, DEM, Groene Ster, Oss '20, SJC, TOGB, Meerssen

=== National titles 1975–2010 ===
==== By club ====
#	Clubs
6	IJsselmeervogels
3	Geldrop, Katwijk
2	ACV, RKC Waalwijk, De Treffers, Quick Boys, Baronie
1	Spijkenisse, Rohda Raalte, Noordwijk, Spakenburg, DOS Kampen, RCH, Scheveningen, HSC '21, AGOVV, Huizen, ASWH, Argon, Lisse WKE

==== By day ====
Day	Number of titles	Titles
Saturday	21	1975, 1976, 1977, 1978, 1980, 1983, 1985, 1986, 1988, 1992, 1993, 1994, 1995, 1996, 2000, 2003, 2004, 2005, 2006, 2008, 2010
Sunday	15	1979, 1981, 1982, 1984, 1987, 1989, 1990, 1991, 1997, 1998, 1999, 2001, 2002, 2007, 2009
