= CVV de Jodan Boys =

Association football club in Gouda, Netherlands

Jodan Boys
- Full name: Christelijke Voetbalvereniging de Jodan Boys
- Founded: 1934
- Ground: Sportpark de Oosterwei; Gouda
- Capacity: 1,500
- Chairman: Marco Kastelein
- Manager: Mark Evers
- League: Eerste Klasse C (West 2) (2024–25)
Home colours	Away colours

Christelijke Voetbalvereniging de Jodan Boys is a football club from Gouda, Netherlands. The club was founded in 1934. It is currently playing in the Vierde Divisie.

== History ==
In 2026, it took an early lead in the Vierde Divisie, winning the three first league games of the season.
