= VV Berkum =

Association football club in Zwolle, Netherlands

Berkum
- Full name: Voetbalvereniging Berkum
- Founded: 28 May 1961; 65 years ago
- Ground: De Vegtlust, Zwolle
- Capacity: 3,000
- Chairman: Jan Teun Fuller
- Manager: Eduard Lindeboom
- League: Vierde Divisie
- 2022–23: Saturday Vierde Divisie B, 8th of 16
- Website: http://www.vvberkum.nl/
Home colours

Voetbalvereniging Berkum is a football club from Zwolle, Netherlands. Berkum is currently competing in the Saturday Vierde Divisie B league. The club plays home games at the De Vegtlust ground. Berkum has played in the Round of 32 of the KNVB Cup, most recently in 2015–16.
