= 2013–14 Hoofdklasse =

Hoofdklasse
- Season: 2013–14
- Champions: Sat A: Sparta Nijkerk; Sat B: Hoek; Sat C: SC Genemuiden; Sun A: Koninklijke HFC; Sun B: OJC Rosmalen; Sun C: Hercules
- Promoted: Sat A: Sparta Nijkerk, Ajax (amateurs); Sat B: Hoek; Sat C: SC Genemuiden; Sun A: Koninklijke HFC, EDO; Sun B: OJC Rosmalen; Sun C: Hercules
- Relegated: Sat A: Sportlust '46, SDV Barneveld; Sat B: Deltasport, Heinenoord, Oranje Wit; Sat C: DETO, Go-Ahead Kampen, Berkum; Sun A: GOES, RKAVV, Nieuwenhoorn, Boshuizen; Sun B: Nuenen, EHC, Venray, Bekkerveld; Sun C: Alverna, Hoogeveen, Longa '30, Joure

The 2013–14 Hoofdklasse season of the Hoofdklasse was contested in six leagues, three Saturday leagues and three Sunday leagues. The champions of each group were promoted directly to the 2014–15 Topklasse. The 2013–14 Hoofdklasse season started on Saturday 7 September 2013.

== Teams ==
=== Saturday A ===
Location of teams in the Saturday A

Club	Home City	Venue	Capacity
Ajax (amateurs)	Amsterdam	De Toekomst	5,000
Bennekom	Bennekom	Eikelhof	4,000
DOVO	Veenendaal	Panhuis	n/a
DVS '33	Ermelo	DVS '33	
Huizen	Huizen	De Wolfskamer	5,000
Montfoort	Montfoort	Hofland	
ODIN '59	Heemskerk	Assumburg	
Quick Boys	Katwijk aan Zee	Nieuw-Zuid	7,500
SDC Putten	Putten	Putter Eng	4,000
SDV Barneveld	Barneveld	Norschoten	
Sparta Nijkerk	Nijkerk	Ebbenhorst	5,350
Sportlust '46	Woerden	Cromwijck	1,400
Volendam	Volendam	Gem. Sportpark	
VVA '71	Achterberg	De Meent	

=== Saturday B ===
Location of teams in the Saturday B

Club	Location	Venue	Capacity
Achilles Veen	Veen	De Heuye	
ASWH	Hendrik-Ido-Ambacht	Sportpark Schildman	3,000
Deltasport	Vlaardingen	Sportpark de Broekpolder	
FC 's-Gravenzande	's-Gravenzande	Juliana	
Heinenoord	Heinenoord	De Tienvoet	
Hoek	Hoek	Denoek	2,500
Jodan Boys	Gouda	Oosterwei	1,500
Kloetinge	Kloetinge	Wesselopark	1,500
Oranje Wit	Dordrecht	Stadspolders	
RVVH	Ridderkerk	Ridderkerk	3,000
Smitshoek	Barendrecht	Smitshoek	1,000
SteDoCo	Hoornaar	Stedoco	
XerxesDZB	Rotterdam	Sportpark Faas Wilkes	3,500
Zwaluwen	Vlaardingen	Zwaluwen	

=== Saturday C ===
Location of teams in the Saturday C

Club	Location	Venue	Capacity
ACV	Assen	Univé Sportpark	5.000
AZSV	Aalten	Villekamp	
Berkum	Zwolle	De Vegtlust	3.000
CSV Apeldoorn	Apeldoorn	Sportpark Orderbos	2.500
DETO	Vriezenveen	't Midden	4,000
Drachtster Boys	Drachten	Drachtster Bos	
Flevo Boys	Emmeloord	Sportpark Ervenbos	3.000
Go-Ahead Kampen	Kampen	Middenwetering	
Harkemase Boys	Harkema	De Bosk	5.500
SC Genemuiden	Genemuiden	De Wetering	5,900
Staphorst	Staphorst	Het Noorderslag	2.500
SVZW	Wierden	Het Lageveld	3,000
VVOG	Harderwijk	De Strokel	2,500
WHC	Wezep	Mulderssingel	500

=== Sunday A ===
Location of teams in the Sunday A

Club	Location	Venue	Capacity
ASV De Dijk	Amsterdam	Schellingwoude	1,500
Boshuizen	Leiden	Boshuizerkade	
De Zouaven	Grootebroek	De Kloet	
DHC	Delft	Brasserskade	
DOSKO	Bergen op Zoom	Meilust	
EDO	Haarlem	Noordersportpark	
GOES	Goes	Het Schenge	
Hollandia	Hoorn	Juliana	2,500
Koninklijke HFC	Haarlem	Kon. HFC	
Nieuwenhoorn	Nieuwenhoorn, Hellevoetsluis	Nieuwenhoorn	
Quick (H)	The Hague	Nieuw Hanenburg	
RKAVV	Leidschendam	De Kastelenring	
Westlandia	Naaldwijk	Hoge Bomen	2,000
VOC	Rotterdam		

=== Sunday B ===
Location of teams in the Sunday B

Club	Location	Venue	Capacity
Baronie	Breda	Sportpark De Blauwe Kei	7.000
Bekkerveld	Heerlen	Aarveld	
Blauw Geel '38	Veghel	Prins Willem Alexander	2,000
De Valk	Valkenswaard	Het Valkennest	
Deurne	Deurne	De Kranenmortel	
Dongen	Dongen	De Biezen	
EHC	Hoensbroek	De Dem	2,000
Gemert	Gemert	Molenbroek	4,000
Groene Ster	Heerlen	Pronsebroek	
Nuenen	Nuenen	Oude Landen	
OJC Rosmalen	Rosmalen	De Groote Wielen	
Schijndel	Schijndel	De Rooise Heide	
UDI '19	Uden	Parkzicht	
Venray	Venray	De Wieen	

=== Sunday C ===
Location of teams in the Sunday C

Club	Location	Venue	Capacity
Alcides	Meppel	Ezinge	
Alverna	Wijchen	Bospad	
De Bataven	Gendt	Walburgen	
FVC	Leeuwarden	Wiarda	
Hercules	Utrecht	Voordorp	
Hoogeveen	Hoogeveen	Bentinckspark	6,000
Joure	Joure	De Hege Simmerdyk	
Longa '30	Lichtenvoorde	De Treffer	
MSC	Meppel	Ezinge	
SC NEC	Nijmegen	De Eendracht	
Quick '20	Oldenzaal	Vondersweijde	6,500
RKHVV	Huissen	De Blauwenburcht	
Rohda Raalte	Raalte	Tijenraan	
Sneek Wit Zwart	Sneek	Molenkrite	3,500

== League tables ==
=== Saturday A ===
Pos	Team	Pld	W	D	L	GF	GA	GD	Pts	Promotion or relegation
1	Sparta Nijkerk (C, P)	26	18	6	2	61	31	+30	60	Promotion to 2014–15 Topklasse
2	Ajax Amateurs (O, P)	26	15	8	3	59	28	+31	53	Qualification for 2014–15 Topklasse play-offs
3	Quick Boys	26	15	5	6	51	37	+14	50	Qualification for 2014–15 Topklasse play-offs
4	DVS '33	26	12	7	7	49	38	+11	43	Qualification for 2014–15 Topklasse play-offs
5	Huizen	26	10	7	9	52	44	+8	37	
6	Bennekom	26	10	5	11	41	38	+3	35	
7	ODIN '59	26	9	7	10	41	43	−2	34	
8	SDC Putten	26	8	8	10	46	51	−5	32	
9	RKAV Volendam	26	9	5	12	43	56	−13	32	
10	VVA '71	26	8	6	12	38	49	−11	30	
11	DOVO (O)	26	8	5	13	36	45	−9	29	Qualification for 2014–15 Eerste Klasse playoffs
12	Montfoort (O)	26	7	5	14	38	55	−17	26	Qualification for 2014–15 Eerste Klasse playoffs
13	Sportlust '46 (R)	26	5	8	13	26	38	−12	23	Relegation to 2014–15 Eerste Klasse
14	SDV Barneveld (R)	26	5	4	17	23	51	−28	19	Relegation to 2014–15 Eerste Klasse

Updated to match(es) played on 10 May 2014. Source:
Rules for classification: 1) points; 2) goal difference; 3) number of goals scored.
(C) Champions; (O) Play-off winners; (P) Promoted; (R) Relegated

=== Saturday B ===
Pos	Team	Pld	W	D	L	GF	GA	GD	Pts	Promotion or relegation
1	Hoek (C, P)	26	18	4	4	49	18	+31	58	Promotion to 2014–15 Topklasse
2	RVVH	26	12	11	3	28	13	+15	47	Qualification for 2014–15 Topklasse play-offs
3	SteDoCo	26	13	5	8	54	36	+18	44	Qualification for 2014–15 Topklasse play-offs
4	Zwaluwen	26	13	5	8	42	33	+9	44	
5	Smitshoek	26	12	5	9	36	31	+5	41	
6	Achilles Veen	26	11	5	10	38	40	−2	38	
7	ASWH	26	10	7	9	49	38	+11	37	Qualification for 2014–15 Topklasse play-offs
8	Xerxes	26	10	6	10	43	31	+12	36	
9	FC 's-Gravenzande	26	10	6	10	35	44	−9	36	
10	Jodan Boys	26	10	4	12	44	50	−6	34	
11	Kloetinge (O)	26	8	7	11	43	50	−7	31	Qualification for 2014–15 Eerste Klasse playoffs
12	Deltasport (R)	26	8	4	14	32	46	−14	28	Qualification for 2014–15 Eerste Klasse playoffs
13	Heinenoord (R)	26	6	3	17	39	69	−30	21	Relegation to 2014–15 Eerste Klasse
14	Oranje Wit (R)	26	3	4	19	20	63	−43	13	Relegation to 2014–15 Eerste Klasse

Updated to match(es) played on 10 May 2014. Source:
Rules for classification: 1) points; 2) goal difference; 3) number of goals scored.
(C) Champions; (O) Play-off winners; (P) Promoted; (R) Relegated

=== Saturday C ===
Pos	Team	Pld	W	D	L	GF	GA	GD	Pts	Promotion or relegation
1	Genemuiden (C, P)	26	16	3	7	60	39	+21	51	Promotion to 2014–15 Topklasse
2	Harkemase Boys	26	15	5	6	56	38	+18	50	Qualification for 2014–15 Topklasse play-offs
3	Staphorst	26	14	7	5	59	35	+24	49	Qualification for 2014–15 Topklasse play-offs
4	Flevo Boys	26	15	3	8	62	45	+17	48	
5	ACV	26	13	6	7	46	34	+12	45	Qualification for 2014–15 Topklasse play-offs
6	SVZW	26	10	7	9	45	33	+12	37	
7	CSV Apeldoorn	26	10	5	11	39	44	−5	35	
8	Drachtster Boys	26	9	5	12	29	35	−6	32	
9	AZSV	26	9	4	13	38	45	−7	31	
10	VVOG	26	7	7	12	44	45	−1	28	
11	WHC (O)	26	7	7	12	39	66	−27	28	Qualification for 2014–15 Eerste Klasse playoffs
12	DETO (R)	26	7	5	14	31	46	−15	26	Qualification for 2014–15 Eerste Klasse playoffs
13	Go-Ahead Kampen (R)	26	6	7	13	39	60	−21	25	Relegation to 2014–15 Eerste Klasse
14	Berkum (R)	26	7	3	16	33	48	−15	24	Relegation to 2014–15 Eerste Klasse

Updated to match(es) played on 10 May 2014. Source:
Rules for classification: 1) points; 2) goal difference; 3) number of goals scored.
(C) Champions; (O) Play-off winners; (P) Promoted; (R) Relegated

=== Sunday A ===
Pos	Team	Pld	W	D	L	GF	GA	GD	Pts	Promotion or relegation
1	Koninklijke HFC (C, P)	26	17	5	4	62	36	+26	56	Promotion to 2014–15 Topklasse
2	EDO (O, P)	26	16	3	7	56	31	+25	51	Qualification for 2014–15 Topklasse play-offs
3	Westlandia	26	15	4	7	64	43	+21	49	Qualification for 2014–15 Topklasse play-offs
4	ASV De Dijk	22	11	3	8	42	37	+5	36	
5	De Zouaven	26	12	4	10	53	52	+1	40	Qualification for 2014–15 Topklasse play-offs
6	VOC	26	11	4	11	58	50	+8	37	
7	Quick (H)	26	10	6	10	45	43	+2	36	
8	DOSKO	26	10	6	10	45	47	−2	36	
9	DHC	26	10	5	11	47	51	−4	35	
10	Hollandia	26	9	7	10	39	42	−3	34	
11	GOES (R)	26	8	7	11	55	56	−1	31	Qualification for 2014–15 Eerste Klasse playoffs
12	RKAVV (R)	26	9	4	13	42	62	−20	31	Qualification for 2014–15 Eerste Klasse playoffs
13	Nieuwenhoorn (R)	26	8	5	13	44	52	−8	29	Relegation to 2014–15 Eerste Klasse
14	Boshuizen (R)	12	1	4	7	33	67	−34	7	Relegation to 2014–15 Eerste Klasse

Updated to match(es) played on 11 May 2014. Source:
Rules for classification: 1) points; 2) goal difference; 3) number of goals scored.
(C) Champions; (O) Play-off winners; (P) Promoted; (R) Relegated

=== Sunday B ===
Pos	Team	Pld	W	D	L	GF	GA	GD	Pts	Promotion or relegation
1	OJC Rosmalen (C, P)	26	18	5	3	58	22	+36	59	Promotion to 2014–15 Topklasse
2	Blauw Geel '38	26	15	5	6	47	16	+31	50	Qualification for 2014–15 Topklasse play-offs
3	Gemert	26	15	5	6	46	27	+19	50	Qualification for 2014–15 Topklasse play-offs
4	Dongen	26	14	4	8	50	34	+16	46	Qualification for 2014–15 Topklasse play-offs
5	UDI '19	26	13	5	8	48	38	+10	44	
6	Deurne	26	11	5	10	36	31	+5	38	
7	Groene Ster	26	9	7	10	36	48	−12	34	
8	Baronie	26	9	5	12	36	49	−13	32	
9	De Valk	26	9	4	13	31	46	−15	31	
10	Schijndel	26	8	5	13	43	55	−12	29	
11	Nuenen (R)	26	7	6	13	45	42	+3	27	Qualification for 2014–15 Eerste Klasse playoffs
12	EHC (R)	26	7	6	13	36	48	−12	27	Qualification for 2014–15 Eerste Klasse playoffs
13	Venray (R)	26	7	3	16	31	56	−25	24	Relegation to 2014–15 Eerste Klasse
14	Bekkerveld (R)	26	3	8	15	22	54	−32	17	Relegation to 2014–15 Eerste Klasse

Updated to match(es) played on 11 May 2014. Source:
Rules for classification: 1) points; 2) goal difference; 3) number of goals scored.
(C) Champions; (P) Promoted; (R) Relegated

=== Sunday C ===
Pos	Team	Pld	W	D	L	GF	GA	GD	Pts	Promotion or relegation
1	Hercules (C, P)	26	17	5	4	69	45	+24	56	Promotion to 2014–15 Topklasse
2	Quick '20	26	17	3	6	60	29	+31	54	Qualification for 2014–15 Topklasse play-offs
3	MSC	26	15	6	5	64	33	+31	51	Qualification for 2014–15 Topklasse play-offs
4	Sneek Wit Zwart	26	14	3	9	59	46	+13	45	Qualification for 2014–15 Topklasse play-offs
5	Alcides	26	12	6	8	55	43	+12	42	
6	Rohda Raalte	26	10	8	8	53	41	+12	38	
7	De Bataven	26	11	2	13	47	50	−3	35	
8	SC NEC	26	10	5	11	47	61	−14	35	
9	RKHVV	26	9	7	10	56	58	−2	34	
10	FVC	26	10	3	13	51	66	−15	33	
11	Alverna (R)	26	9	4	13	39	42	−3	31	Qualification for 2014–15 Eerste Klasse playoffs
12	Hoogeveen (R)	26	8	6	12	46	54	−8	30	Qualification for 2014–15 Eerste Klasse playoffs
13	Longa '30 (R)	26	5	5	16	40	69	−29	20	Relegation to 2014–15 Eerste Klasse
14	Joure (R)	26	3	1	22	31	90	−59	10	Relegation to 2014–15 Eerste Klasse

Updated to match(es) played on 11 May 2014. Source:
Rules for classification: 1) points; 2) goal difference; 3) number of goals scored.
(C) Champions; (P) Promoted; (R) Relegated

== Promotion/relegation play-off Topklasse – Hoofdklasse ==
=== First round ===
The 3 period winners of each league were grouped together and played a semi-competition to decide which of the three continued to the second round. Each team played one match at home and one match away.

==== Saturday A ====
Pos	Team	Pld	W	D	L	GF	GA	GD	Pts
1	Ajax (amateurs)	2	1	1	0	5	2	+3	4
2	Quick Boys	2	1	1	0	1	0	+1	4
3	DVS '33	2	0	0	2	2	6	−4	0

==== Saturday B ====
Pos	Team	Pld	W	D	L	GF	GA	GD	Pts
1	SteDoCo	2	2	0	0	5	3	+2	6
2	RVVH	2	1	0	1	3	3	0	3
3	ASWH	2	0	0	2	3	5	−2	0

==== Saturday C ====
Pos	Team	Pld	W	D	L	GF	GA	GD	Pts
1	Staphorst	2	1	1	0	6	2	+4	4
2	ACV	2	1	0	1	1	4	−3	3
3	Harkemase Boys	2	0	1	1	2	3	−1	1

==== Sunday A ====
Pos	Team	Pld	W	D	L	GF	GA	GD	Pts
1	EDO	2	2	0	0	5	1	+4	6
2	Westlandia	2	1	0	1	3	3	0	3
3	De Zouaven	2	0	0	2	2	6	−4	0

==== Sunday B ====
Pos	Team	Pld	W	D	L	GF	GA	GD	Pts
1	Dongen	2	1	1	0	3	2	+1	4
2	Blauw Geel '38	2	1	0	1	3	3	0	3
3	Gemert	2	0	1	1	0	1	−1	1

==== Sunday C ====
Pos	Team	Pld	W	D	L	GF	GA	GD	Pts
1	MSC	2	2	0	0	2	0	+2	6
2	Quick '20	2	1	0	1	4	1	+3	3
3	Sneek Wit Zwart	2	0	0	2	0	5	−5	0

=== Second and final round ===
The 3 remaining teams from the Saturday leagues and the team ranked 13th in the 2013–14 Topklasse Saturday league played in a knockout system for 1 berth in the 2014–15 Topklasse Saturday league.
Likewise, the 3 remaining teams from the Sunday leagues and the team ranked 13th in the 2013–14 Topklasse Sunday league played in a knockout system for 1 berth in the 2014–15 Topklasse Sunday league.
For details and results see 2013–14 Topklasse promotion/relegation play-offs.

== Promotion/relegation play-off Hoofdklasse – Eerste Klasse ==
=== Saturday ===
The teams ranked 11th and 12th of each of the 3 Saturday leagues (6 teams) and the 3 period winners of each of the 5 Saturday Eerste Klasse leagues (15 teams), making a total of 21 teams were grouped in 7 groups of 3 teams in such a way that the Hoofdklasse teams each end up in a different group. In each group the 3 teams played a semi competition in such a way that each team played one match at home and one match away.
The 7 group winners played next season in the 2014–15 Hoofdklasse and the remaining teams in the 2014–15 Eerste Klasse.

==== Group 1 ====
Pos	Team	Pld	W	D	L	GF	GA	GD	Pts
1	DOVO	2	1	0	1	3	2	+1	3 (Note: Based on mutual result ARC (1) – DOVO (3))
2	ARC	2	1	0	1	5	4	+1	3
3	Sliedrecht	2	1	0	1	2	4	−2	3

==== Group 2 ====
Pos	Team	Pld	W	D	L	GF	GA	GD	Pts
1	Montfoort	2	2	0	0	4	2	+2	6
2	DSO	2	1	0	1	3	1	+2	3
3	VVZ '49	2	0	0	2	2	6	−4	0

==== Group 3 ====
Pos	Team	Pld	W	D	L	GF	GA	GD	Pts
1	Kloetinge	2	1	1	0	5	2	+3	4 (Note: Based on penalty shoot-outs Zwaluwen '30 (4) – Kloetinge (5).)
2	Zwaluwen '30	2	1	1	0	5	2	+3	4
3	Nieuw-Lekkerland	2	0	0	2	0	6	−6	0

==== Group 4 ====
Pos	Team	Pld	W	D	L	GF	GA	GD	Pts
1	SHO	2	1	1	0	5	3	+2	4
2	Swift	2	1	1	0	2	1	+1	4
3	Deltasport	2	0	0	2	2	5	−3	0

==== Group 5 ====
Pos	Team	Pld	W	D	L	GF	GA	GD	Pts
1	WVF	2	2	0	0	6	2	+4	6
2	LRC	2	1	0	1	3	3	0	3
3	Oranje Nassau	2	0	0	2	2	6	−4	0

==== Group 6 ====
Pos	Team	Pld	W	D	L	GF	GA	GD	Pts
1	WHC	2	2	0	0	6	3	+3	6
2	Olde Veste '54	2	1	0	1	4	5	−1	3
3	Nunspeet	2	0	0	2	2	4	−2	0

==== Group 7 ====
Pos	Team	Pld	W	D	L	GF	GA	GD	Pts
1	NSC	2	2	0	0	8	1	+7	6
2	Bedum	2	1	0	1	3	5	−2	3
3	DETO	2	0	0	2	0	5	−5	0

=== Sunday ===
The teams ranked 11th and 12th of each of the 3 Sunday leagues (6 teams) and the 3 period winners of each of the 6 Sunday Eerste Klasse leagues (18 teams), making a total of 24 teams, played in a 2-round 2 leg knockout system in such a way that the Hoofdklasse teams can never meet each other.
The 6 winners of the second round matches played next season in the 2014–15 Hoofdklasse and the remaining teams in the 2014–15 Eerste Klasse.

First round
1	De Meern	1	3	4
4	GOES	1	2	3
3	UVS	1	1	2
2	AFC '34	2	2	4

Final round
De Meern	0	2	2
AFC '34	3	3	6

First round
1	OFC	7	2	9
4	Nieuwerkerk	1	1	2
3	RKAVV	2	3	5
2	SJC	1	0	1

Final round
OFC	3	5	8
RKAVV	1	1	2

First round
1	LONGA	2	2	4
4	Nuenen	1	5	6
3	DESO	0	1	1
2	TEC	1	2	3

Final round
Nuenen	2	0	2
TEC (a.e.t.)	1	2	3

First round
1	Oss '20 (a.e.t.)	2	5	7
4	Limburgia	3	1	4
3	EHC	3	5	8
2	Heidebloem	2	4	6

Final round
Oss '20 ^{(Penalties)}	1	2	3 (4)
EHC	1	2	3 (3)

First round
1	Hoogland	1	1	2
4	Alverna	0	1	1
3	Emmen	0	3	3
2	AWC	3	2	5

Final round
Hoogland	2	1	3
AWC	3	1	4

First round
1	Germania	1	1	2
4	SVBO	0	0	0
3	Hoogeveen	5	4	9
2	VKW	2	1	3

Final round
Germania	1	1	2
Hoogeveen	0	0	0

Last updated: 1 June 2014.
