= 2014–15 Hoofdklasse =

Hoofdklasse
- Season: 2014–15
- Champions: Sat A: SteDoCo; Sat B: Katwijk; Sat C: DVS '33; Sun A: Magreb '90; Sun B: TEC; Sun C: Sneek Wit Zwart
- Promoted: Sat A: SteDoCo; Sat B: Katwijk, RVVH; Sat C: DVS '33; Sun A: Magreb '90; Sun B: TEC; Sun C: Sneek Wit Zwart
- Relegated: Sat A: Breukelen, DFS, Montfoort, Volendam; Sat B: Smitshoek, Kloetinge, SHO, 's-Gravenzande; Sat C: WHC, WVF; Sun A: VOC, De Zouaven, AFC '34, Haaglandia; Sun B: Schijndel, Deurne, De Valk, AWC; Sun C: SC NEC, AFC Arnhem, Germania, FVC

The 2014–15 season of the Hoofdklasse is competed in six leagues, three Saturday leagues and three Sunday leagues. The champions of each group will be promoted directly to the 2015–16 Topklasse. The 2014–15 Hoofdklasse started on Saturday 6 September 2014.

== Teams ==
=== Saturday A ===
Location of teams in the Saturday A

| Club | Home City | Venue | Capacity |
|---|---|---|---|
| Achilles Veen | Veen | Sportpark De Hanen Weide | |
| Bennekom | Bennekom | De Eikelhof | 4,000 |
| Breukelen | Breukelen | Sportpark Broekdijk-Oost | |
| DFS | Opheusden | Sportpark 't Heerenland | |
| DOVO | Veenendaal | Sportpark Panhuis | 3,200 |
| Huizen | Huizen | Sportpark De Wolfskamer | 5,000 |
| Jodan Boys | Gouda | Sportpark Oosterwei | 1,500 |
| Montfoort | Montfoort | Sportpark Hofland | |
| NSC | Nijkerk | Sportpark De NSC Burcht | |
| ODIN '59 | Heemskerk | Sportpark Assumburg | 3,000 |
| SDC Putten | Putten | Sportpark Putter Eng | 4,000 |
| SteDoCo | Hoornaar | Sportpark SteDoCo | |
| Volendam | Volendam | Gemeentelijk Sportpark | |
| VVA '71 | Achterberg | De Meent | |

=== Saturday B ===
Location of teams in the Saturday B

| Club | Location | Venue | Capacity |
|---|---|---|---|
| ASWH | Hendrik-Ido-Ambacht | Sportpark Schildman | 3,000 |
| 's-Gravenzande | 's-Gravenzande | Juliana Sportpark | |
| Katwijk | Katwijk | Sportpark De Krom | 6.000 |
| Kloetinge | Kloetinge | Sportpark Wesselopark | 1,500 |
| Noordwijk | Noordwijk | Sportpark Duin Wetering | |
| Quick Boys | Katwijk aan Zee | Nieuw-Zuid | 7,500 |
| Rijnvogels | Katwijk aan den Rijn | Sportpark De Kooltuin | |
| RVVH | Ridderkerk | Sportpark Ridderkerk | 3,000 |
| SHO | Oud-Beijerland | Sportcomplex Kikkershoek | |
| Smitshoek | Barendrecht | Sportpark Smitshoek | 1,000 |
| Spijkenisse | Spijkenisse | Sportpark Jaap Riedijk | |
| Ter Leede | Sassenheim | Gemeentelijk Sportpark De Roodemolen | |
| XerxesDZB | Rotterdam | Sportpark Faas Wilkes | 3,500 |
| Zwaluwen | Vlaardingen | Sportpark Zwaluwenlaan | |

=== Saturday C ===
Location of teams in the Saturday C

| Club | Location | Venue | Capacity |
|---|---|---|---|
| ACV | Assen | Univé Sportpark | 5.000 |
| AZSV | Aalten | Villekamp | |
| CSV Apeldoorn | Apeldoorn | Sportpark Orderbos | 2.500 |
| Drachtster Boys | Drachten | Drachtster Bos | |
| DVS '33 | Ermelo | DVS '33 | |
| Excelsior '31 | Rijssen | Sportpark De Koerbelt | |
| Flevo Boys | Emmeloord | Sportpark Ervenbos | 3.000 |
| Harkemase Boys | Harkema | De Bosk | 5.500 |
| Staphorst | Staphorst | Het Noorderslag | 2.500 |
| SVZW | Wierden | Het Lageveld | 3,000 |
| Urk | Urk | Sportpark De Vormt | |
| VVOG | Harderwijk | De Strokel | 2,500 |
| WHC | Wezep | Mulderssingel | 500 |
| WVF | Zwolle | Sportpark De Weide Steen | |

=== Sunday A ===
Location of teams in the Sunday A

| Club | Location | Venue | Capacity |
|---|---|---|---|
| AFC '34 | Alkmaar | Gemeentelijk Sportpark | |
| Chabab | Amsterdam | Sportpark Sloten | |
| DHC | Delft | Brasserskade | |
| ASV De Dijk | Amsterdam | Schellingwoude | 1,500 |
| Haaglandia | Rijswijk | Prinses Irene Sportpark | |
| Hollandia | Hoorn | Juliana | 2,500 |
| JOS Watergraafsmeer | Amsterdam | Sportpark Drieburg | |
| Magreb '90 | Utrecht | Sportpark Papendorp | 1,000 |
| OFC | Oostzaan | Sportpark OFC | 1,500 |
| Quick | The Hague | Nieuw Hanenburg | |
| Vlissingen | Vlissingen | Sportpark Irislaan | |
| VOC | Rotterdam | Sportpark VOC | |
| Westlandia | Naaldwijk | Sportpark De Hoge Bomen | 2,000 |
| De Zouaven | Grootebroek | Sportpark De Kloet | |

=== Sunday B ===
Location of teams in the Sunday B

| Club | Location | Venue | Capacity |
|---|---|---|---|
| AWC | Wijchen | Sportpark De Wijchert | |
| Baronie | Breda | Sportpark De Blauwe Kei | 7.000 |
| Blauw Geel '38 | Veghel | Prins Willem Alexander Sportpark | 2,000 |
| Deurne | Deurne | Sportpark De Kranenmortel | |
| Dongen | Dongen | De Biezen | |
| DOSKO | Bergen op Zoom | Meilust | |
| Gemert | Gemert | Molenbroek | 4,000 |
| Groene Ster | Heerlen | Pronsebroek | |
| Oss '20 | Oss | Sportpark De Rusheuvel | |
| Schijndel | Schijndel | Sportpark Zuideinderpark | |
| TEC | Tiel | Sportpark De Lok | |
| SV TOP | Oss | Sportpark TOP | |
| UDI '19 | Uden | Parkzicht | |
| De Valk | Valkenswaard | Het Valkennest | |

=== Sunday C ===
Location of teams in the Sunday C

| Club | Location | Venue | Capacity |
|---|---|---|---|
| Achilles 1894 | Assen | Sportpark Marsdijk | |
| Alcides | Meppel | Ezinge | |
| AFC Arnhem | Arnhem | Sportpark Over het Lange Water | |
| De Bataven | Gendt | Walburgen | |
| Be Quick 1887 | Haren | Stadion Esserberg | 12,000 |
| FVC | Leeuwarden | Wiarda | |
| Germania | Groesbeek | Sportpark Noord | |
| Juliana '31 | Malden | De Broeklanden | |
| MSC | Meppel | Ezinge | |
| SC NEC | Nijmegen | De Eendracht | |
| Quick '20 | Oldenzaal | Vondersweijde | 6,500 |
| RKHVV | Huissen | De Blauwenburcht | |
| Rohda Raalte | Raalte | Tijenraan | |
| Sneek Wit Zwart | Sneek | Sportpark VV Sneek Wit Zwart | 3,500 |

== League tables ==
=== Saturday A ===
| Pos | Team | Pld | W | D | L | GF | GA | GD | Pts | Qualification or relegation |
|---|---|---|---|---|---|---|---|---|---|---|
| 1 | SteDoCo (Note: Winner of the Second Period (round 9-17).) (C, P) | 26 | 15 | 6 | 5 | 50 | 30 | +20 | 51 | Promotion to 2015–16 Topklasse Saturday |
| 2 | ODIN '59 (Note: Winner of the First Period (round 1-8).) | 26 | 14 | 4 | 8 | 45 | 38 | +7 | 46 | Qualification for promotion/relegation play-offs Topklasse/Hoofdklasse |
| 3 | DOVO (Note: Winner of the Third Period (round 18-26).) | 26 | 11 | 7 | 8 | 39 | 30 | +9 | 40 | Qualification for promotion/relegation play-offs Topklasse/Hoofdklasse |
| 4 | Achilles Veen (Note: Substitute winner of the Second Period.) | 26 | 12 | 4 | 10 | 43 | 39 | +4 | 40 | Qualification for promotion/relegation play-offs Topklasse/Hoofdklasse |
| 5 | VVA '71 | 26 | 10 | 9 | 7 | 44 | 33 | +11 | 39 | |
| 6 | Bennekom | 26 | 9 | 9 | 8 | 32 | 36 | −4 | 36 | |
| 7 | Jodan Boys | 26 | 9 | 8 | 9 | 46 | 35 | +11 | 35 | |
| 8 | Huizen | 26 | 8 | 11 | 7 | 37 | 32 | +5 | 35 | |
| 9 | SDC Putten | 26 | 9 | 7 | 10 | 38 | 39 | −1 | 34 | |
| 10 | NSC | 26 | 9 | 7 | 10 | 44 | 51 | −7 | 34 | |
| 11 | Breukelen (R) | 26 | 8 | 8 | 10 | 47 | 60 | −13 | 32 | Qualification promotion/relegation play-offs Hoofdklasse/Eerste Klasse |
| 12 | DFS (R) | 26 | 8 | 5 | 13 | 32 | 46 | −14 | 29 | Qualification promotion/relegation play-offs Hoofdklasse/Eerste Klasse |
| 13 | Montfoort (R) | 26 | 6 | 6 | 14 | 30 | 40 | −10 | 24 | Relegation to 2015–16 Eerste Klasse |
| 14 | Volendam (R) | 26 | 7 | 3 | 16 | 46 | 64 | −18 | 24 | Relegation to 2015–16 Eerste Klasse |

(C) Champions; (P) Promoted; (R) Relegated

=== Saturday B ===
| Pos | Team | Pld | W | D | L | GF | GA | GD | Pts | Qualification or relegation |
|---|---|---|---|---|---|---|---|---|---|---|
| 1 | Katwijk (Note: Winner of the First Period (round 1-8).) (C, P) | 26 | 20 | 4 | 2 | 69 | 26 | +43 | 64 | Promotion to 2015–16 Topklasse Saturday |
| 2 | Quick Boys (Note: Substitute winner of the First Period.) | 26 | 14 | 6 | 6 | 49 | 28 | +21 | 48 | Qualification for promotion/relegation play-offs Topklasse/Hoofdklasse |
| 3 | RVVH (Note: Winner of the Second Period (round 9-17).) (O, P) | 26 | 12 | 7 | 7 | 40 | 30 | +10 | 43 | Qualification for promotion/relegation play-offs Topklasse/Hoofdklasse |
| 4 | ASWH | 26 | 11 | 8 | 7 | 53 | 31 | +22 | 41 | |
| 5 | Zwaluwen | 26 | 13 | 2 | 11 | 42 | 41 | +1 | 41 | |
| 6 | Spijkenisse (Note: Winner of the Third Period (round 18-26).) | 26 | 12 | 4 | 10 | 43 | 36 | +7 | 40 | Qualification for promotion/relegation play-offs Topklasse/Hoofdklasse |
| 7 | Noordwijk | 26 | 11 | 5 | 10 | 42 | 39 | +3 | 38 | |
| 8 | Rijnvogels | 26 | 10 | 6 | 10 | 47 | 47 | 0 | 36 | |
| 9 | Ter Leede | 26 | 11 | 2 | 13 | 41 | 42 | −1 | 35 | |
| 10 | XerxesDZB | 26 | 8 | 5 | 13 | 41 | 56 | −15 | 29 | |
| 11 | Smitshoek (R) | 26 | 7 | 7 | 12 | 37 | 52 | −15 | 28 | Qualification promotion/relegation play-offs Hoofdklasse/Eerste Klasse |
| 12 | Kloetinge (R) | 26 | 8 | 4 | 14 | 34 | 50 | −16 | 28 | Qualification promotion/relegation play-offs Hoofdklasse/Eerste Klasse |
| 13 | SHO (R) | 26 | 5 | 8 | 13 | 37 | 70 | −33 | 23 | Relegation to 2015–16 Eerste Klasse |
| 14 | 's-Gravenzande (R) | 26 | 4 | 4 | 18 | 29 | 56 | −27 | 16 | Relegation to 2015–16 Eerste Klasse |

(C) Champions; (O) Play-off winners; (P) Promoted; (R) Relegated

=== Saturday C ===
| Pos | Team | Pld | W | D | L | GF | GA | GD | Pts | Qualification or relegation |
|---|---|---|---|---|---|---|---|---|---|---|
| 1 | DVS '33 (C, P) | 26 | 17 | 4 | 5 | 68 | 29 | +39 | 55 | Promotion to 2015–16 Topklasse Saturday |
| 2 | Excelsior '31 (Note: Winner of the Second Period (round 9-17).) | 26 | 16 | 5 | 5 | 65 | 26 | +39 | 53 | Qualification for promotion/relegation play-offs Topklasse/Hoofdklasse |
| 3 | Harkemase Boys (Note: Winner of the Third Period (round 18-26).) | 26 | 16 | 4 | 6 | 62 | 33 | +29 | 52 | Qualification for promotion/relegation play-offs Topklasse/Hoofdklasse |
| 4 | SVZW | 26 | 13 | 5 | 8 | 52 | 43 | +9 | 44 | |
| 5 | ACV (Note: Winner of the First Period (round 1-8).) | 26 | 13 | 4 | 9 | 50 | 40 | +10 | 43 | Qualification for promotion/relegation play-offs Topklasse/Hoofdklasse |
| 6 | Flevo Boys | 26 | 11 | 6 | 9 | 47 | 46 | +1 | 39 | |
| 7 | CSV Apeldoorn | 26 | 12 | 1 | 13 | 37 | 46 | −9 | 37 | |
| 8 | VVOG | 26 | 10 | 6 | 10 | 38 | 39 | −1 | 36 | |
| 9 | AZSV | 26 | 8 | 8 | 10 | 35 | 36 | −1 | 32 | |
| 10 | Drachtster Boys | 26 | 8 | 8 | 10 | 31 | 36 | −5 | 32 | |
| 11 | Urk (O) | 26 | 9 | 5 | 12 | 39 | 53 | −14 | 32 | Qualification promotion/relegation play-offs Hoofdklasse/Eerste Klasse |
| 12 | Staphorst (O) | 26 | 6 | 8 | 12 | 33 | 48 | −15 | 26 | Qualification promotion/relegation play-offs Hoofdklasse/Eerste Klasse |
| 13 | WHC (R) | 26 | 6 | 2 | 18 | 28 | 67 | −39 | 20 | Relegation to 2015–16 Eerste Klasse |
| 14 | WVF (R) | 26 | 2 | 4 | 20 | 15 | 58 | −43 | 10 | Relegation to 2015–16 Eerste Klasse |

(C) Champions; (O) Play-off winners; (P) Promoted; (R) Relegated

=== Sunday A ===
| Pos | Team | Pld | W | D | L | GF | GA | GD | Pts | Qualification or relegation |
|---|---|---|---|---|---|---|---|---|---|---|
| 1 | Magreb '90 (Note: Winner of the Third Period (round 14-26).) (C, P) | 24 | 16 | 4 | 4 | 61 | 32 | +29 | 52 | Promotion to 2015–16 Topklasse Sunday |
| 2 | ASV De Dijk (Note: Winner of the Second Period (round 9-17).) | 24 | 16 | 2 | 6 | 51 | 32 | +19 | 50 | Qualification for promotion/relegation play-offs Topklasse/Hoofdklasse |
| 3 | Vlissingen (Note: Substitute winner of the Third Period.) | 24 | 13 | 4 | 7 | 47 | 41 | +6 | 43 | Qualification for promotion/relegation play-offs Topklasse/Hoofdklasse |
| 4 | OFC | 24 | 11 | 5 | 8 | 54 | 38 | +16 | 38 | |
| 5 | Westlandia (Note: Westlandia and Chabab got a penalty point for their abandoned match.) | 24 | 12 | 2 | 10 | 46 | 36 | +10 | 37 | |
| 6 | Quick (Note: Winner of the First Period (round 1-8).) | 24 | 10 | 6 | 8 | 50 | 51 | −1 | 36 | Qualification for promotion/relegation play-offs Topklasse/Hoofdklasse |
| 7 | Chabab | 24 | 10 | 4 | 10 | 48 | 51 | −3 | 33 | |
| 8 | JOS Watergraafsmeer | 24 | 9 | 6 | 9 | 44 | 50 | −6 | 33 | |
| 9 | DHC | 24 | 9 | 3 | 12 | 48 | 55 | −7 | 30 | |
| 10 | Hollandia | 24 | 7 | 6 | 11 | 37 | 38 | −1 | 27 | |
| 11 | VOC (R) | 24 | 7 | 3 | 14 | 41 | 57 | −16 | 24 | Qualification promotion/relegation play-offs Hoofdklasse/Eerste Klasse |
| 12 | De Zouaven (R) | 24 | 6 | 3 | 15 | 31 | 52 | −21 | 21 | Qualification promotion/relegation play-offs Hoofdklasse/Eerste Klasse |
| 13 | AFC '34 (R) | 24 | 5 | 2 | 17 | 33 | 58 | −25 | 17 | Relegation to 2015–16 Eerste Klasse |
| 14 | Haaglandia (Note: Haaglandia was taken out of competition after they informed the KNVB they were not going to play the remaining matches of the season.) (R) | 18 | 0 | 0 | 18 | 12 | 92 | −80 | −1 | Taken out of competition, all matches declared void |

(C) Champions; (P) Promoted; (R) Relegated

=== Sunday B ===
| Pos | Team | Pld | W | D | L | GF | GA | GD | Pts | Qualification or relegation |
|---|---|---|---|---|---|---|---|---|---|---|
| 1 | TEC (C, P) | 26 | 16 | 5 | 5 | 56 | 27 | +29 | 53 | Promotion to 2015–16 Topklasse Sunday |
| 2 | Gemert (Note: Winner of the Second Period (round 9-17).) | 26 | 15 | 7 | 4 | 60 | 36 | +24 | 52 | Qualification for promotion/relegation play-offs Topklasse/Hoofdklasse |
| 3 | UDI '19 | 26 | 15 | 4 | 7 | 54 | 33 | +21 | 49 | |
| 4 | Oss '20 (Note: Winner of the Third Period (round 18-26).) | 26 | 15 | 3 | 8 | 68 | 36 | +32 | 48 | Qualification for promotion/relegation play-offs Topklasse/Hoofdklasse |
| 5 | Dongen | 26 | 15 | 3 | 8 | 64 | 41 | +23 | 48 | |
| 6 | Blauw Geel '38 | 26 | 14 | 4 | 8 | 41 | 25 | +16 | 46 | |
| 7 | Baronie | 26 | 12 | 4 | 10 | 42 | 44 | −2 | 40 | |
| 8 | SV TOP | 26 | 12 | 3 | 11 | 53 | 61 | −8 | 39 | |
| 9 | DOSKO (Note: Winner of the First Period (round 1-8).) | 26 | 9 | 8 | 9 | 41 | 38 | +3 | 35 | Qualification for promotion/relegation play-offs Topklasse/Hoofdklasse |
| 10 | Groene Ster | 26 | 9 | 4 | 13 | 40 | 46 | −6 | 31 | |
| 11 | Schijndel (R) | 26 | 7 | 4 | 15 | 39 | 55 | −16 | 25 | Qualification promotion/relegation play-offs Hoofdklasse/Eerste Klasse |
| 12 | Deurne (R) | 26 | 7 | 3 | 16 | 35 | 65 | −30 | 24 | Qualification promotion/relegation play-offs Hoofdklasse/Eerste Klasse |
| 13 | De Valk (R) | 26 | 4 | 4 | 18 | 24 | 58 | −34 | 16 | Relegation to 2015–16 Eerste Klasse |
| 14 | AWC (R) | 26 | 3 | 2 | 21 | 24 | 76 | −52 | 11 | Relegation to 2015–16 Eerste Klasse |

(C) Champions; (P) Promoted; (R) Relegated

=== Sunday C ===
| Pos | Team | Pld | W | D | L | GF | GA | GD | Pts | Qualification or relegation |
|---|---|---|---|---|---|---|---|---|---|---|
| 1 | Sneek Wit Zwart (Note: Winner of the Second Period (round 9-17).) (C, P) | 26 | 18 | 3 | 5 | 82 | 29 | +53 | 57 | Promotion to 2015–16 Topklasse Sunday |
| 2 | MSC (Note: Substitute winner of the Second Period.) | 26 | 14 | 7 | 5 | 54 | 26 | +28 | 49 | Qualification for promotion/relegation play-offs Topklasse/Hoofdklasse |
| 3 | Rohda Raalte (Note: Winner of the First Period (round 1-8).) | 26 | 13 | 8 | 5 | 58 | 40 | +18 | 47 | Qualification for promotion/relegation play-offs Topklasse/Hoofdklasse |
| 4 | Quick '20 | 26 | 13 | 6 | 7 | 62 | 37 | +25 | 45 | |
| 5 | RKHVV (Note: Winner of the Third Period (round 18-26).) | 26 | 13 | 6 | 7 | 38 | 38 | 0 | 45 | Qualification for promotion/relegation play-offs Topklasse/Hoofdklasse |
| 6 | Juliana '31 | 26 | 11 | 8 | 7 | 35 | 29 | +6 | 41 | |
| 7 | Be Quick 1887 | 26 | 10 | 4 | 12 | 41 | 46 | −5 | 34 | |
| 8 | Alcides | 26 | 9 | 6 | 11 | 41 | 41 | 0 | 33 | |
| 9 | De Bataven | 26 | 9 | 6 | 11 | 50 | 62 | −12 | 33 | |
| 10 | Achilles 1894 | 26 | 8 | 7 | 11 | 41 | 50 | −9 | 31 | |
| 11 | SC NEC (R) | 26 | 7 | 7 | 12 | 37 | 46 | −9 | 28 | Qualification promotion/relegation play-offs Hoofdklasse/Eerste Klasse |
| 12 | AFC Arnhem (R) | 26 | 7 | 4 | 15 | 44 | 65 | −21 | 25 | Qualification promotion/relegation play-offs Hoofdklasse/Eerste Klasse |
| 13 | Germania (R) | 26 | 6 | 6 | 14 | 34 | 59 | −25 | 24 | Relegation to 2015–16 Eerste Klasse |
| 14 | FVC (R) | 26 | 3 | 4 | 19 | 26 | 75 | −49 | 13 | Relegation to 2015–16 Eerste Klasse |

(C) Champions; (P) Promoted; (R) Relegated

== Promotion/relegation play-off Topklasse – Hoofdklasse ==
=== First round ===
The 3 period winners of each league are grouped together and play a semi-competition to decide which of the three continues to the second round. Each team plays one match at home and one match away.

==== Saturday A ====
| Pos | Team | Pld | W | D | L | GF | GA | GD | Pts | Second round or Hoofdklasse | DOV | ACH | ODI |
|---|---|---|---|---|---|---|---|---|---|---|---|---|---|
| 1 | DOVO | 2 | 1 | 0 | 1 | 9 | 2 | +7 | 3 | To Second round | | | 8–0 |
| 2 | Achilles Veen | 2 | 1 | 0 | 1 | 2 | 4 | −2 | 3 | To 2015–16 Hoofdklasse Saturday | 2–1 | | |
| 3 | ODIN '59 | 2 | 1 | 0 | 1 | 3 | 8 | −5 | 3 | To 2015–16 Hoofdklasse Saturday | | 3–0 | |

==== Saturday B ====
| Pos | Team | Pld | W | D | L | GF | GA | GD | Pts | Second round or Hoofdklasse | RVV | QUI | SPI |
|---|---|---|---|---|---|---|---|---|---|---|---|---|---|
| 1 | RVVH | 2 | 1 | 1 | 0 | 5 | 2 | +3 | 4 | To Second round | | | 3–0 |
| 2 | Quick Boys | 2 | 1 | 1 | 0 | 5 | 3 | +2 | 4 | To 2015–16 Hoofdklasse Saturday | 2–2 | | |
| 3 | Spijkenisse | 2 | 0 | 0 | 2 | 1 | 6 | −5 | 0 | To 2015–16 Hoofdklasse Saturday | | 1–3 | |

==== Saturday C ====
| Pos | Team | Pld | W | D | L | GF | GA | GD | Pts | Second round or Hoofdklasse | ACV | HAR | EXC |
|---|---|---|---|---|---|---|---|---|---|---|---|---|---|
| 1 | ACV | 2 | 2 | 0 | 0 | 3 | 0 | +3 | 6 | To Second round | | 2–0 | |
| 2 | Harkemase Boys | 2 | 1 | 0 | 1 | 5 | 4 | +1 | 3 | To 2015–16 Hoofdklasse Saturday | | | 5–2 |
| 3 | Excelsior '31 | 2 | 0 | 0 | 2 | 2 | 6 | −4 | 0 | To 2015–16 Hoofdklasse Saturday | 0–1 | | |

==== Sunday A ====
| Pos | Team | Pld | W | D | L | GF | GA | GD | Pts | Second round or Hoofdklasse | VLI | DIJ | QUI |
|---|---|---|---|---|---|---|---|---|---|---|---|---|---|
| 1 | Vlissingen | 2 | 2 | 0 | 0 | 4 | 1 | +3 | 6 | To Second round | | | 2–1 |
| 2 | ASV De Dijk | 2 | 1 | 0 | 1 | 3 | 3 | 0 | 3 | To 2015–16 Hoofdklasse Sunday | 0–2 | | |
| 3 | Quick | 2 | 0 | 0 | 2 | 2 | 5 | −3 | 0 | To 2015–16 Hoofdklasse Sunday | | 1–3 | |

==== Sunday B ====
| Pos | Team | Pld | W | D | L | GF | GA | GD | Pts | Second round or Hoofdklasse | OSS | GEM | DOS |
|---|---|---|---|---|---|---|---|---|---|---|---|---|---|
| 1 | Oss '20 | 2 | 1 | 1 | 0 | 5 | 3 | +2 | 4 | To Second round | | | 4–2 |
| 2 | Gemert | 2 | 0 | 2 | 0 | 2 | 2 | 0 | 2 | To 2015–16 Hoofdklasse Sunday | 1–1 | | |
| 3 | DOSKO | 2 | 0 | 1 | 1 | 3 | 5 | −2 | 1 | To 2015–16 Hoofdklasse Sunday | | 1–1 | |

==== Sunday C ====
| Pos | Team | Pld | W | D | L | GF | GA | GD | Pts | Second round or Hoofdklasse | MSC | RKH | ROH |
|---|---|---|---|---|---|---|---|---|---|---|---|---|---|
| 1 | MSC (Note: Based on best ranked in regular season.) | 2 | 1 | 1 | 0 | 3 | 1 | +2 | 4 | To Second round | | 1–1 | |
| 2 | RKHVV | 2 | 1 | 1 | 0 | 4 | 2 | +2 | 4 | To 2015–16 Hoofdklasse Sunday | | | 3–1 |
| 3 | Rohda Raalte | 2 | 0 | 0 | 2 | 1 | 5 | −4 | 0 | To 2015–16 Hoofdklasse Sunday | 0–2 | | |

=== Second and Final round ===
The 3 remaining teams from the Saturday leagues and the team ranked 13th in the 2014–15 Topklasse Saturday league play in a knock-out system for 1 spot in the 2015–16 Topklasse Saturday league.
Likewise, the 3 remaining teams from the Sunday leagues and the team ranked 13th in the 2014–15 Topklasse Sunday league play in a knock-out system for 1 spot in the 2015–16 Topklasse Sunday league.
For details and results see 2014–15 Topklasse promotion/relegation play-offs.

== Promotion/relegation play-off Hoofdklasse – Eerste Klasse ==
=== Saturday ===
The teams ranked 11th and 12th of each of the 3 Saturday leagues (6 teams) and the 3 period winners of each of the 5 Saturday Eerste Klasse leagues (15 teams), making a total of 21 teams are grouped in 7 groups of 3 teams in such a way that the Hoofdklasse teams each end up in a different group. In each group the 3 teams play a semi-competition in such a way that each team plays one match at home and one match away.
The 7 group winners will play next season in the 2015–16 Hoofdklasse and the remaining teams in the 2015–16 Eerste klasse.

==== Group 1 ====
| Pos | Team | Pld | W | D | L | GF | GA | GD | Pts | Hoofdklasse or Eerste Klasse | EEM | BRE | RIJ |
|---|---|---|---|---|---|---|---|---|---|---|---|---|---|
| 1 | Eemdijk (O, P) | 2 | 2 | 0 | 0 | 6 | 1 | +5 | 6 | To 2015–16 Hoofdklasse Saturday | | | 1–0 |
| 2 | Breukelen | 2 | 1 | 0 | 1 | 3 | 5 | −2 | 3 | To 2015–16 Eerste Klasse Saturday | 1–5 | | |
| 3 | Rijsoord | 2 | 0 | 0 | 2 | 0 | 3 | −3 | 0 | To 2015–16 Eerste Klasse Saturday | | 0–2 | |

(O) Play-off winners; (P) Promoted

==== Group 2 ====
| Pos | Team | Pld | W | D | L | GF | GA | GD | Pts | Hoofdklasse or Eerste Klasse | DEL | DFS | NIE |
|---|---|---|---|---|---|---|---|---|---|---|---|---|---|
| 1 | Deltasport (O, P) | 2 | 1 | 1 | 0 | 4 | 2 | +2 | 4 | To 2015–16 Hoofdklasse Saturday | | 2–0 | |
| 2 | DFS | 2 | 1 | 0 | 1 | 6 | 2 | +4 | 3 | To 2015–16 Eerste Klasse Saturday | | | 6–0 |
| 3 | JSV Nieuwegein | 2 | 0 | 1 | 1 | 2 | 8 | −6 | 1 | To 2015–16 Eerste Klasse Saturday | 2–2 | | |

(O) Play-off winners; (P) Promoted

==== Group 3 ====
| Pos | Team | Pld | W | D | L | GF | GA | GD | Pts | Hoofdklasse or Eerste Klasse | HAA | NLE | SMI |
|---|---|---|---|---|---|---|---|---|---|---|---|---|---|
| 1 | Haaglandia (O, P) | 2 | 2 | 0 | 0 | 4 | 2 | +2 | 6 | To 2015–16 Hoofdklasse Saturday | | 2–1 | |
| 2 | Nieuw-Lekkerland | 2 | 1 | 0 | 1 | 3 | 3 | 0 | 3 | To 2015–16 Eerste Klasse Saturday | | | 2–1 |
| 3 | Smitshoek | 2 | 0 | 0 | 2 | 2 | 4 | −2 | 0 | To 2015–16 Eerste Klasse Saturday | 1–2 | | |

(O) Play-off winners; (P) Promoted

==== Group 4 ====
| Pos | Team | Pld | W | D | L | GF | GA | GD | Pts | Hoofdklasse or Eerste Klasse | SWI | KLO | SLI |
|---|---|---|---|---|---|---|---|---|---|---|---|---|---|
| 1 | Swift (O, P) | 2 | 1 | 1 | 0 | 3 | 0 | +3 | 4 | To 2015–16 Hoofdklasse Saturday | | | 3–0 |
| 2 | Kloetinge | 2 | 1 | 1 | 0 | 1 | 0 | +1 | 4 | To 2015–16 Eerste Klasse Saturday | 0–0 | | |
| 3 | Sliedrecht | 2 | 0 | 0 | 2 | 0 | 4 | −4 | 0 | To 2015–16 Eerste Klasse Saturday | | 0–1 | |

(O) Play-off winners; (P) Promoted

==== Group 5 ====
| Pos | Team | Pld | W | D | L | GF | GA | GD | Pts | Hoofdklasse or Eerste Klasse | LRC | BUI | SPA |
|---|---|---|---|---|---|---|---|---|---|---|---|---|---|
| 1 | LRC (O, P) | 2 | 2 | 0 | 0 | 6 | 2 | +4 | 6 | To 2015–16 Hoofdklasse Saturday | | | 2–0 |
| 2 | Buitenpost | 2 | 1 | 0 | 1 | 5 | 5 | 0 | 3 | To 2015–16 Eerste Klasse Saturday | 2–4 | | |
| 3 | Sparta Enschede | 2 | 0 | 0 | 2 | 1 | 5 | −4 | 0 | To 2015–16 Eerste Klasse Saturday | | 1–3 | |

(O) Play-off winners; (P) Promoted

==== Group 6 ====
| Pos | Team | Pld | W | D | L | GF | GA | GD | Pts | Hoofdklasse or Eerste Klasse | URK | DET | BAL |
|---|---|---|---|---|---|---|---|---|---|---|---|---|---|
| 1 | Urk (O) | 2 | 2 | 0 | 0 | 4 | 0 | +4 | 6 | To 2015–16 Hoofdklasse Saturday | | 3–0 | |
| 2 | DETO | 2 | 1 | 0 | 1 | 1 | 3 | −2 | 3 | To 2015–16 Eerste Klasse Saturday | | | 1–0 |
| 3 | Balk | 2 | 0 | 0 | 2 | 0 | 2 | −2 | 0 | To 2015–16 Eerste Klasse Saturday | 0–1 | | |

(O) Play-off winners

==== Group 7 ====
| Pos | Team | Pld | W | D | L | GF | GA | GD | Pts | Hoofdklasse or Eerste Klasse | STA | PKC | BER |
|---|---|---|---|---|---|---|---|---|---|---|---|---|---|
| 1 | Staphorst (O) | 2 | 2 | 0 | 0 | 8 | 0 | +8 | 6 | To 2015–16 Hoofdklasse Saturday | | | 4–0 |
| 2 | PKC '83 | 2 | 1 | 0 | 1 | 3 | 4 | −1 | 3 | To 2015–16 Eerste Klasse Saturday | 0–4 | | |
| 3 | Berkum | 2 | 0 | 0 | 2 | 0 | 7 | −7 | 0 | To 2015–16 Eerste Klasse Saturday | | 0–3 | |

(O) Play-off winners

=== Sunday ===
The teams ranked 11th and 12th of each of the 3 Sunday leagues (6 teams) and the 3 period winners of each of the 6 Sunday Eerste Klasse leagues (18 teams), making a total of 24 teams, play in a 2-round 2 leg knockout system in such a way that the Hoofdklasse teams can never meet each other.
The 6 winners of the second round matches will play next season in the 2014–15 Hoofdklasse and the remaining teams in the 2014–15 Eerste klasse.

First round
1 | Alphense Boys | 2 | 1 | 3
4 | VOC | 0 | 2 | 2
3 | Poortugaal | 1 | 0 | 1
2 | SDO | 1 | 3 | 4

Final round
Alphense Boys | 1 | 1 | 2
SDO | 2 | 2 | 4

First round
1 | Purmersteijn | 1 | 0 | 1
4 | Nieuwerkerk | 1 | 3 | 4
3 | De Zouaven | 1 | 2 | 3
2 | IFC ^{(a.e.t.)} | 1 | 3 | 4

Final round
Nieuwerkerk | 1 | 1 | 2
IFC | 0 | 0 | 0

First round
1 | Beerse Boys | 6 | 1 | 7
4 | Schijndel | 0 | 3 | 3
3 | Wittenhorst | 0 | 1 | 1
2 | DESO | 0 | 5 | 5

Final round
Beerse Boys | 0 | 1 | 1
DESO ^{(a.e.t.)} | 0 | 3 | 3

First round
1 | Gestel | 1 | 3 | 4
4 | Venray | 0 | 2 | 2
3 | Deurne | 2 | 1 | 3
2 | Bekkerveld | 1 | 0 | 1

Final round
Gestel | 2 | 6 | 8
Deurne | 3 | 3 | 6

First round
1 | Hoogland | 2 | 0 | 2
4 | SC NEC | 2 | 1 | 3
3 | Erica | 0 | 1 | 1
2 | Silvolde | 1 | 5 | 6

Final round
SC NEC | 2 | 0 | 2
Silvolde | 3 | 4 | 7

First round
1 | Rigtersbleek | 3 | 2 | 5
4 | SVBO | 0 | 0 | 0
3 | AFC Arnhem | 2 | 2 | 4
2 | Hoogeveen | 0 | 0 | 0

Final round
Rigtersbleek ^{(Penalties)} | 1 | 1 | 2 (15)
AFC Arnhem | 2 | 0 | 2 (14)

Updated to games played on 7 June 2015.
