= 2012–13 KNVB Cup =

Tournament details
- Country: Netherlands
- Teams: 92

Final positions
- Champions: AZ (4th title)
- Runners-up: PSV Eindhoven

Tournament statistics
- Matches played: 91
- Goals scored: 345 (3.79 per match)
- Top goal scorer(s): Jozy Altidore (8 goals)

The 2012–13 KNVB Cup tournament was the 95th edition of the Dutch national football annual knockout tournament to determine the KNVB Cup winners. 92 teams contested 91 matches beginning on 21 August 2012 with the matches of Round 1 and ending with the final on 9 May 2013.

PSV Eindhoven were defending their 2012 title. The winners qualified for the play-off round in the 2013–14 UEFA Europa League.

PSV reached the final but lost to AZ Alkmaar.

== Participants ==
92 teams contesting 91 matches. The 18 clubs of the Eredivisie and the 18 clubs of the Eerste divisie qualified automatically, entering in the second round. Other teams qualified by winning period titles in the previous season's competition or by winning a local KNVB Cup, called 'districtsbeker', for clubs from level 3 onwards, in the previous season.

League	Clubs			
Eredivisie (1)	ADO Den Haag	PSV Eindhoven	NEC Nijmegen	FC Utrecht
Eredivisie (1)	Ajax	SC Heerenveen	RKC Waalwijk	VVV-Venlo
Eredivisie (1)	AZ Alkmaar	Heracles Almelo	Roda JC Kerkrade	Vitesse
Eredivisie (1)	Feyenoord	NAC Breda	FC Twente	Willem II
Eredivisie (1)	FC Groningen	PEC Zwolle		
Eerste divisie (2)	AGOVV Apeldoorn	FC Eindhoven	De Graafschap	Sparta
Eerste divisie (2)	Almere City FC	FC Emmen	Helmond Sport	Telstar
Eerste divisie (2)	SC Cambuur	Excelsior	MVV Maastricht	SC Veendam
Eerste divisie (2)	FC Den Bosch	Fortuna Sittard	FC Oss	FC Volendam
Eerste divisie (2)	FC Dordrecht	Go Ahead Eagles		
Topklasse (3)	Achilles '29	VV Gemert	HSC '21	VV Noordwijk
Topklasse (3)	ADO '20	Excelsior '31	IJsselmeervogels	Rijnsburgse Boys
Topklasse (3)	AFC	SC Genemuiden	Jodan Boys	SVV Scheveningen
Topklasse (3)	BVV Barendrecht	GVVV	JVC Cuijk	VV Sneek Wit Zwart
Topklasse (3)	vv Capelle	Haaglandia	VV Katwijk	SV Spakenburg
Topklasse (3)	FC Chabab	HBS Craeyenhout	Kozakken Boys	De Treffers
Topklasse (3)	DETO	HHC Hardenberg	FC Lienden	VVSB
Topklasse (3)	EVV	HVV Hollandia	FC Lisse	WKE Emmen
Hoofdklasse (4)	MVV Alcides	RKSV Groene Ster	ONS Sneek	VV UNA
Hoofdklasse (4)	SV Argon	Hoogeveen	RKHVV	VVOG
Hoofdklasse (4)	DVS '33	VV Kloetinge	RVVH	XerxesDZB
Hoofdklasse (4)	EHC	RKSV Leonidas	Sparta Nijkerk	VV De Zouaven
Hoofdklasse (4)	SC Feyenoord am.	VV Montfoort	VV Staphorst	
Tweede Klasse (6)	DESO	VV Internos	NVC	GVV Unitas
Derde Klasse (7)	VV Sittard			

== Calendar ==
The calendar for the 2012–13 KNVB Cup was as follows.

Rounds	Date
First round	22 August 2012
Second round	25, 26 or 27 September 2012
Third round	30, 31 October 2012 or 1 November 2012
Fourth round	18, 19 or 20 December 2012
Quarter-finals	29, 30 or 31 January 2013
Semi-finals	26, 27 or 28 February 2013
Final	9 May 2013

== First round ==
56 amateur clubs competed in this stage of the competition for a place in the Second Round. These matches took place on 21 and 22 August 2012.

Team 1	Score	Team 2
IJsselmeervogels (3)	6−2	Argon (4)
Excelsior '31 (3)	2−3 (a.e.t.)	FC Lienden (3)
Rijnsburgse Boys (3)	2−1	HSC '21 (3)
VV Kloetinge (4)	3−1	EVV (3)
VV De Zouaven (4)	3−2	DETO (3)
HBS Craeyenhout (3)	3−2	HHC Hardenberg (3)
Capelle (3)	3−0	GVV Unitas (6)
VV Noordwijk (3)	4−1	VV Sittard (7)
Hoogeveen (4)	1−3	DESO (6)
VV UNA (4)	3−4 (a.e.t.)	SVV Scheveningen (3)
Chabab (3)	1−2	RVVH (4)
VV Staphorst (4)	5−1	Haaglandia (3)
Sparta Nijkerk (4)	3−1	WKE Emmen (3)
Kozakken Boys (3)	5−0	MVV Alcides (4)
SV Spakenburg (3)	0−4	Achilles '29 (3)
De Treffers (3)	1−1 (a.e.t.) (5−6 p)	Montfoort (4)
SWZ Sneek (3)	1−1 (a.e.t.) (6−5 p)	Jodan Boys (3)
JVC Cuijk (3)	3−3 (a.e.t.) (5−4 p)	Barendrecht (3)
XerxesDZB (4)	3−0	NVC (6)
DVS '33 (4)	0−1	AFC (3)
Lisse (3)	4−2 (a.e.t.)	RKHVV (4)
Gemert (3)	2−1	VVSB (3)
SC Feyenoord am. (4)	0−2 (a.e.t.)	HVV Hollandia (3)
ADO '20 (3)	3−2 (a.e.t.)	Katwijk (3)
GVVV (3)	4−0	RKSV Groene Ster (4)
VVOG (4)	3−3 (a.e.t.) (4−2 p)	RKSV Leonidas (4)
VV Internos (6)	0−5	ONS Sneek (4)
EHC (4)	4−1	Genemuiden (3)

== Second round ==
The 28 winners from the First Round entered in this stage of the competition along with the 18 Eerste Divisie clubs and the 18 Eredivisie clubs. These matches took place from 25 to 27 September 2012.

Team 1	Score	Team 2
SVV Scheveningen (3)	2−1 (a.e.t.)	FC Oss (2)
AFC (3)	0−1 (a.e.t.)	FC Den Bosch (2)
Go Ahead Eagles (2)	4−4 (4–3 p)	VVV-Venlo (1)
Sparta (2)	3–2	AGOVV Apeldoorn (2)
Sparta Nijkerk (4)	2−3	De Graafschap (2)
JVC Cuijk (3)	2−4 (a.e.t.)	FC Eindhoven (2)
HVV Hollandia (3)	1−0	Fortuna Sittard (2)
VV Staphorst (4)	2−0	Montfoort (4)
ADO '20 (3)	4−1	Almere City FC (2)
VVOG (4)	0−0 (4–5 p)	FC Emmen (2)
Lisse (3)	0−5	RKC Waalwijk (1)
ONS Sneek (4)	1−1 (5–4 p)	SBV Excelsior (2)
Roda JC (1)	0−1 (a.e.t.)	PEC Zwolle (1)
RVVH (4)	0−1	FC Twente (1)
Rijnsburgse Boys (3)	1−0	FC Volendam (2)
VV Kloetinge (4)	0−4	Telstar (2)
DESO (6)	1−5	SC Cambuur (2)
NEC (1)	2−3 (a.e.t.)	Feyenoord (1)
VV Gemert (3)	0−3	Vitesse Arnhem (1)
Kozakken Boys (3)	0−4	SC Heerenveen (1)
SWZ Sneek (3)	2−1 (a.e.t.)	VV Noordwijk (3)
Willem II (1)	0−2	FC Dordrecht (2)
IJsselmeervogels (3)	0−2	ADO Den Haag (1)
XerxesDZB (3)	3−3 (6–5 p)	Helmond Sport (2)
GVVV (3)	1−2	FC Groningen (1)
FC Lienden (3)	0−4	Heracles Almelo (1)
MVV Maastricht (2)	1−3	NAC Breda (1)
Capelle (3)	3−4 (a.e.t.)	HBS Craeyenhout (3)
FC Utrecht (1)	0−3	Ajax (1)
Achilles '29 (3)	2−3	PSV Eindhoven (1)
VV De Zouaven (4)	0−1	EHC (4)
AZ (1)	4−1	SC Veendam (2)

== Third round ==
These matches took place from 30 October to 1 November 2012.

Team 1	Score	Team 2
FC Twente (1)	1–2	FC Den Bosch (2)
Vitesse Arnhem (1)	4–0	VV Staphorst (4)
SWZ Sneek (3)	1–4	AZ (1)
XerxesDZB (4)	0–4	Feyenoord (1)
ONS Sneek (4)	0–2	Ajax (1)
SC Heerenveen (1)	1–0	HVV Hollandia (3)
PSV Eindhoven (1)	3–1	EHC (4)
RKC Waalwijk (1)	2–4	PEC Zwolle (1)
ADO '20 (3)	6–1	FC Eindhoven (2)
SC Cambuur (2)	1–1 (4–3 p)	Telstar (2)
De Graafschap (2)	0–3	Go Ahead Eagles (2)
FC Dordrecht (2)	2–1	SVV Scheveningen (3)
FC Groningen (1)	1–0	ADO Den Haag (1)
Rijnsburgse Boys (3)	0–0 (7–6 p)	FC Emmen (2)
Heracles Almelo (1)	2–0	Sparta (2)
NAC Breda (1)	1–1 (5–3 p)	HBS Craeyenhout (3)

== Fourth round ==
These matches took place from 18 to 20 December 2012.

Team 1	Score	Team 2
Vitesse Arnhem (1)	10–1	ADO '20 (3)
FC Dordrecht (2)	2–4	AZ (1)
FC Den Bosch (2)	1–0	SC Cambuur (2)
FC Groningen (1)	0–3	Ajax (1)
Go Ahead Eagles (2)	2–3 (a.e.t.)	PEC Zwolle (1)
SC Heerenveen (1)	2–2 (6–7 p)	Feyenoord (1)
NAC Breda (1)	1–3	Heracles Almelo (1)
Rijnsburgse Boys (3)	0–4	PSV Eindhoven (1)

== Quarter-finals ==
These matches will take place from 29 to 31 January 2013.

Team 1	Score	Team 2
Vitesse Arnhem (1)	0–4	Ajax (1)
PSV Eindhoven (1)	2–1	Feyenoord (1)
FC Den Bosch (2)	0–5	AZ (1)
PEC Zwolle (1)	3–2	Heracles Almelo (1)

== Semi-finals ==
27 February 2013
18:45

PEC Zwolle (1)	0 – 3	PSV Eindhoven (1)
		Locadia 16', 34', 85'

IJsseldelta Stadion, Zwolle
Attendance: 11,324
Referee: Ruud Bossen

27 February 2013
20:45

Ajax (1)	0 – 3	AZ (1)
		Altidore 74', 90+3'; Guðmundsson 88'

Amsterdam Arena, Amsterdam
Attendance: 35,609
Referee: Kevin Blom

== Final ==
9 May 2013
18:00

AZ (1)	2 – 1	PSV Eindhoven (1)
Maher 12'; Altidore 14'		Locadia 31'

De Kuip, Rotterdam
Attendance: 50,000
Referee: Björn Kuipers

== Participants per round ==
The number of participants per league per round was as follows:

League	First round	Second round	Third round	Fourth round	Quarter-finals	Semi-finals	Final	Winner
Eredivisie (1)	(bye)	18 (28%)	13 (41%)	10 (63%)	7 (87%)	4 (100%)	2 (100%)	1 (100%)
Eerste divisie (2)	(bye)	18 (28%)	9 (28%)	4 (25%)	1 (13%)	0 (0%)		
Topklasse (3)	32 (57%)	17 (27%)	6 (19%)	2 (13%)	0 (0%)			
Hoofdklasse (4)	19 (34%)	10 (16%)	4 (13%)	0 (0%)				
Eerste klasse (5)	0 (0%)	0 (0%)	0 (0%)					
Tweede Klasse (6)	4 (7%)	1 (2%)	0 (0%)					
Derde Klasse (7)	1 (2%)	0 (0%)						
Total	56	64	32	16	8	4	2	1
