= 2013–14 Topklasse =

4th season of the third-tier football league in the Netherlands

Topklasse
- Season: 2013–14
- Champions: Overall: Spakenburg; Sat: Spakenburg; Sun: AFC
- Relegated: Sat: Noordwijk, Katwijk, Excelsior '31, Ter Leede; Sun: Haaglandia, Be Quick 1887, Juliana '31, Chabab

The 2013–14 Topklasse season is the fourth edition of the Dutch third tier since its inauguration in the current form in 2010. A total 32 teams are participating in the league: 25 from the 2012–13 Topklasse, and the remaining seven from the 2012–13 Hoofdklasse. As usual, the competition is divided into two leagues: "Saturday" and "Sunday", who differ by the day their games are usually played.

For the third consecutive season, no team was relegated from the Eerste Divisie, this time due to the fact all 2012–13 Topklasse have declined promotion into professionalism. However, Achilles '29 did promote from last season's Topklasse to the 2013–14 Eerste Divisie, being the first amateur club to do so.

== Teams ==
=== Saturday league ===
Location of teams in the Saturday Topklasse 2013-2014

Club	City	2012–13 season
Barendrecht	Barendrecht	2nd in Topklasse Saturday
Capelle	Capelle aan den IJssel	7th in Topklasse Saturday
Excelsior '31	Rijssen	10th in Topklasse Saturday
Excelsior Maassluis	Maassluis	1st in Hoofdklasse Saturday B
GVVV	Veenendaal	3rd in Topklasse Saturday
HHC Hardenberg	Hardenberg	4th in Topklasse Saturday
Katwijk	Katwijk	1st in Topklasse Saturday
Kozakken Boys	Werkendam	8th in Topklasse Saturday
Lisse	Lisse	6th in Topklasse Saturday
Noordwijk	Noordwijk	9th in Topklasse Saturday
ONS Sneek	Sneek	1st in Hoofdklasse Saturday C
Rijnsburgse Boys	Rijnsburg	5th in Topklasse Saturday
Scheveningen	Scheveningen (The Hague)	11th in Topklasse Saturday
Ter Leede	Sassenheim	1st in Hoofdklasse Saturday A
Spakenburg	Bunschoten-Spakenburg	13th in Topklasse Saturday
IJsselmeervogels	Bunschoten-Spakenburg	12th in Topklasse Saturday

Source: Voetbal op Zaterdag

=== Sunday league ===
Location of teams in the Sunday Topklasse 2013-2014

Club	City	2012–13 season
ADO '20	Heemskerk	2nd in Topklasse Sunday
AFC	Amsterdam	11th in Topklasse Sunday
Be Quick 1887	Groningen	1st in Hoofdklasse Sunday C
Chabab	Amsterdam	12th in Topklasse Sunday
De Treffers	Groesbeek	3rd in Topklasse Sunday
EVV	Echt	5th in Topklasse Sunday
HBS Craeyenhout	The Hague	8th in Topklasse Sunday
Haaglandia	Rijswijk	13th in Topklasse Sunday
HSC '21	Haaksbergen	6th in Topklasse Sunday
Juliana '31	Malden	6th in Hoofdklasse Sunday C
JVC Cuijk	Cuijk	10th in Topklasse Sunday
Leonidas	Rotterdam	1st in Hoofdklasse Sunday A
Lienden	Lienden	7th in Topklasse Sunday
UNA	Veldhoven	1st in Hoofdklasse Sunday B
VVSB	Noordwijkerhout	9th in Topklasse Sunday
WKE	Emmen	4th in Topklasse Sunday

Source: Amateurvoetbal op Zondag

== League tables ==
=== Saturday league ===
Pos	Team	Pld	W	D	L	GF	GA	GD	Pts	Qualification or relegation
1	GVVV	30	17	3	10	73	44	+29	54	
2	Spakenburg (C)	30	16	6	8	57	38	+19	54	Advance to the championship final
3	HHC Hardenberg	30	16	3	11	67	43	+24	51	
4	IJsselmeervogels	30	14	8	8	62	43	+19	50	
5	Rijnsburgse Boys	30	14	7	9	72	41	+31	49	
6	Excelsior Maassluis	30	15	3	12	49	51	−2	48	
7	Kozakken Boys	30	14	5	11	57	49	+8	47	
8	Lisse	30	13	8	9	48	42	+6	47	
9	Scheveningen	30	13	4	13	43	49	−6	43	
10	ONS Sneek	30	13	3	14	52	66	−14	42	
11	Barendrecht	30	12	3	15	53	57	−4	39	
12	Capelle	30	10	8	12	37	45	−8	38	
13	Noordwijk (R)	30	9	9	12	40	56	−16	36	Qualification to the relegation play-offs
14	Katwijk (R)	30	8	6	16	52	69	−17	30	Relegation to the 2014–15 Hoofdklasse
15	Excelsior '31 (R)	30	8	4	18	52	83	−31	28	Relegation to the 2014–15 Hoofdklasse
16	Ter Leede (R)	30	6	4	20	32	70	−38	22	Relegation to the 2014–15 Hoofdklasse

Rules for classification: 1) points
(C) Champions; (R) Relegated

==== Saturday championship playoff ====
In determining which team becomes champion, only the achieved number of points is considered. The goal difference is completely ignored.
Therefore, GVVV and Spakenburg were considered to have ended equal and had to play an additional match against each other on neutral ground to decide which team would become champion.

24 May 2014

Spakenburg	2-1	GVVV
	Report

Kras Stadion, Volendam

=== Sunday league ===
Pos	Team	Pld	W	D	L	GF	GA	GD	Pts	Qualification or relegation
1	AFC	30	19	5	6	73	41	+32	62	Advance to the championship final
2	UNA	30	17	6	7	74	39	+35	57	
3	VVSB	30	16	9	5	54	31	+23	57	
4	JVC Cuijk	30	16	6	8	68	42	+26	54	
5	EVV	30	15	7	8	49	32	+17	52	
6	HBS Craeyenhout	30	14	9	7	64	43	+21	51	
7	Leonidas	30	12	8	10	47	53	−6	44	
8	ADO '20	30	10	8	12	49	52	−3	38	
9	HSC '21	30	11	5	14	61	66	−5	38	
10	Lienden	30	10	8	12	41	56	−15	38	
11	De Treffers	30	10	7	13	46	47	−1	37	
12	WKE	30	9	9	12	56	51	+5	36	
13	Haaglandia (R)	30	9	6	15	56	66	−10	33	Qualification to the relegation play-offs
14	Be Quick 1887 (R)	30	6	9	15	45	64	−19	27	Relegation to the 2014–15 Hoofdklasse
15	Juliana '31 (R)	30	4	8	18	31	83	−52	20	Relegation to the 2014–15 Hoofdklasse
16	Chabab (R)	30	5	4	21	38	86	−48	19	Relegation to the 2014–15 Hoofdklasse

Rules for classification: 1) points
(R) Relegated

== Championship final ==
31 May 2014

Spakenburg	4-1	AFC
	Report

Sportpark De Westmaat, Spakenburg
7 June 2014

AFC	3-2	Spakenburg
	Report

Sportpark Goed Genoeg, Amsterdam

Spakenburg won overall Topklasse title 6-4 on aggregate.

== Promotion/relegation play-offs ==
=== Topklasse / Hoofdklasse playoff first round ===
In the first round the 3 period winners of each Hoofdklasse league decide which of them 3 continues in the semi-final. For details see Promotion/relegation play-off Topklasse - Hoofdklasse.

In the second/semifinal round, the 3 winners from the 3 Saturday Hoofdklasse leagues are joined with the team ranked 13th in the Saturday Topklasse league to play for 1 spot in the 2014–15 Topklasse Saturday league. Likewise, the 3 winners from the 3 Sunday Hoofdklasse leagues are joined with the team ranked 13th in the Sunday Topklasse league to play for 1 spot in the 2014–15 Topklasse Sunday league.

=== Topklasse / Hoofdklasse playoff semifinals ===
Team 1	Agg.	Team 2	1st leg	2nd leg
SteDoCo	5 - 4	Staphorst	3 - 2	2 - 2
Ajax (amateurs)	8 - 7	Noordwijk	6 - 1	2 - 6
MSC	5 - 4	Dongen	5 - 1	0 - 3
EDO	CANC	Haaglandia (Note: Haaglandia had to play at the same date the final of a regional tournament. They requested EDO to cooperate in moving the match to a different date. After EDO refused to cooperate, Haaglandia withdrew from the semi-finals and EDO proceeded automatically to the finals.)	CANC	CANC

=== Topklasse / Hoofdklasse playoff finals ===
Team 1	Score	Team 2
Ajax (amateurs)	5 - 2	SteDoCo
EDO	1 - 0	MSC

Ajax (amateurs) and EDO promoted to the 2014–15 Topklasse.
