= 2015–16 Topklasse =

6th season of the third-tier football league in the Netherlands

Topklasse
- Season: 2015–16
- Champions: Excelsior Maassluis (overall)
- Promoted: 14 clubs
- Relegated: Sneek Wit Zwart; RVVH

The 2015–16 Topklasse season was the sixth and last edition of the Dutch third tier since its inauguration in the current form in 2010. A total 32 teams participated in the league: 25 from the 2014–15 Topklasse, and the remaining seven from the 2014–15 Hoofdklasse. As usual, the competition was divided into two leagues: "Saturday" and "Sunday", who differed by the day their games were usually played.

For this season only, the first 7 teams from the Saturday and Sunday divisions earned promotion to constitute a new, semi-professional third-division Tweede Divisie. This change in the league system was approved in a KNVB assembly in December 2014. Thus, the Topklasse and leagues below it decremented by one level, and furthermore, promotion and relegation between the Tweede Divisie and the Topklasse became effective from next season. From next season the Topklasse carries the name Derde Divisie and competes as the fourth division.

== Teams ==
=== Saturday league ===
Location of teams in the Saturday Topklasse 2015-16

Club	City	2014–15 season
Barendrecht	Barendrecht	4th in Topklasse Saturday
Capelle	Capelle aan den IJssel	8th in Topklasse Saturday
DVS '33	Ermelo	1st in Hoofdklasse Saturday C
Excelsior Maassluis	Maassluis	10th in Topklasse Saturday
GVVV	Veenendaal	6th in Topklasse Saturday
HHC Hardenberg	Hardenberg	3rd in Topklasse Saturday
Katwijk	Katwijk	1st in Hoofdklasse Saturday B
Kozakken Boys	Werkendam	1st in Topklasse Saturday
Lisse	Lisse	11th in Topklasse Saturday
ONS Sneek	Sneek	12th in Topklasse Saturday
Rijnsburgse Boys	Rijnsburg	7th in Topklasse Saturday
RVVH	Ridderkerk	Hoofdklasse Playoff Winners (3rd in Hoofdklasse Saturday B)
Scheveningen	Scheveningen (The Hague)	9th in Topklasse Saturday
Spakenburg	Bunschoten-Spakenburg	2nd in Topklasse Saturday
SteDoCo	Hoornaar	1st in Hoofdklasse Saturday A
IJsselmeervogels	Bunschoten-Spakenburg	5th in Topklasse Saturday

=== Sunday league ===
Location of teams in the Sunday Topklasse 2015-16

Club	City	2014–15 season
AFC	Amsterdam	10th in Topklasse Sunday
De Treffers	Groesbeek	4th in Topklasse Sunday
EVV	Echt	7th in Topklasse Sunday
HBS Craeyenhout	The Hague	Hoofdklasse Playoff Winners (13th in Topklasse Sunday)
Hercules	Utrecht	12th in Topklasse Sunday
HSC '21	Haaksbergen	11th in Topklasse Sunday
Koninklijke HFC	Haarlem	6th in Topklasse Sunday
JVC Cuijk	Cuijk	5th in Topklasse Sunday
Lienden	Lienden	1st in Topklasse Sunday
Magreb '90	Utrecht	1st in Hoofdklasse Sunday A
OJC Rosmalen	Rosmalen	9th in Topklasse Sunday
Sneek Wit Zwart	Sneek	1st in Hoofdklasse Sunday C
TEC	Tiel	1st in Hoofdklasse Sunday B
UNA	Veldhoven	2nd in Topklasse Sunday
VVSB	Noordwijkerhout	3rd in Topklasse Sunday
WKE	Emmen	8th in Topklasse Sunday

== League tables ==
=== Saturday league ===
Pos	Team	Pld	W	D	L	GF	GA	GD	Pts	Qualification or relegation
1	Excelsior Maassluis (C, P)	30	16	11	3	46	31	+15	59	Championship final and promotion to Tweede Divisie
2	HHC Hardenberg (P)	30	18	4	8	54	38	+16	58	Promotion to Tweede Divisie
3	Katwijk (P)	30	17	6	7	62	36	+26	57	Promotion to Tweede Divisie
4	Kozakken Boys (P)	30	16	6	8	57	39	+18	54	Promotion to Tweede Divisie
5	Barendrecht (P)	30	16	5	9	68	48	+20	53	Promotion to Tweede Divisie
6	Spakenburg (P)	30	13	8	9	67	52	+15	47	Promotion to Tweede Divisie
7	GVVV (P)	30	13	7	10	51	42	+9	46	Promotion to Tweede Divisie
8	Rijnsburgse Boys	30	11	10	9	51	52	−1	43	
9	DVS '33	30	10	9	11	57	53	+4	39	
10	ONS Sneek	30	10	4	16	43	63	−20	34	
11	Capelle	30	8	7	15	36	47	−11	31	
12	IJsselmeervogels	30	8	7	15	34	50	−16	31	
13	Scheveningen	30	7	9	14	42	47	−5	30	
14	SteDoCo	30	8	6	16	41	72	−31	30	
15	Lisse (O)	30	6	11	13	43	54	−11	29	Qualification to relegation play-offs
16	RVVH (R)	30	6	4	20	32	60	−28	22	Relegation to Hoofdklasse

Updated to match(es) played on 14 May 2016. Source: Topklasse.com (in Dutch)
(C) Champions; (O) Play-off winners; (P) Promoted; (R) Relegated

=== Sunday league ===
Pos	Team	Pld	W	D	L	GF	GA	GD	Pts	Qualification or relegation
1	Lienden (P)	28	14	11	3	35	18	+17	53	Championship final and promotion to Tweede Divisie
2	TEC (P)	28	16	4	8	45	29	+16	52	Promotion to Tweede Divisie
3	Koninklijke HFC (P)	28	14	7	7	51	33	+18	49	Promotion to Tweede Divisie
4	De Treffers (P)	28	14	6	8	57	33	+24	48	Promotion to Tweede Divisie
5	VVSB (P)	28	14	5	9	45	25	+20	47	Promotion to Tweede Divisie
6	AFC (P)	28	13	5	10	46	43	+3	44	Promotion to Tweede Divisie
7	UNA (O, P)	28	12	7	9	45	31	+14	43	Qualification to promotion play-offs
8	HSC '21	28	11	10	7	38	32	+6	43	Qualification to promotion play-offs
9	JVC Cuijk	28	13	2	13	42	45	−3	41	
10	Hercules	28	9	10	9	35	43	−8	37	
11	EVV	28	7	9	12	22	31	−9	30	
12	HBS	28	8	4	16	38	50	−12	28	
13	Magreb '90	28	6	6	16	32	52	−20	24	
14	OJC Rosmalen	28	6	6	16	25	49	−24	24	
15	Sneek Wit Zwart (R)	28	4	6	18	26	68	−42	18	Qualification to relegation play-offs
16	WKE (D)	0	0	0	0	0	0	0	0	Club bankrupt, results Annulled (Note: WKE went bankrupt, all results has been expelled.)

Updated to match(es) played on 16 May 2016. Source: Topklasse.com (in Dutch)
(D) Disqualified; (O) Play-off winners; (P) Promoted; (R) Relegated

== Promotion play-off ==
22 May 2016

UNA	1–0	HSC '21

Sportpark De Groenendijkse, Cuijk

== Championship final ==
The Saturday and Sunday champions play a two-legged final for the overall amateur championship. Both division champions will be promoted to the Tweede Divisie.

21 May 2016

Lienden	0-2	Excelsior Maassluis

Sportpark De Abdijhof, Lienden
28 May 2016

Excelsior Maassluis	2-3	Lienden

Sportpark Lavendelstraat, Maassluis

Excelsior won overall Topklasse title 4-3 on aggregate.

== Derde Divisie / Hoofdklasse play-offs ==
Both for the Saturday and Sunday leagues applies the same systematic.

The team ranked 15th in the Topklasse and the 3 period winners of the 3 Hoofdklasse leagues (9 teams), making a total of 10 teams participate in the play-offs. The 10 teams are paired up to play a 1-round 2 leg knockout system. The 5 winners play next season in the 2016–17 Derde Divisie and the 5 losers in the 2016–17 Hoofdklasse.

=== Saturday ===
Team 1	Agg.	Team 2	1st leg	2nd leg
Staphorst	2 - 6	Lisse	1 - 0	1 - 6
Noordwijk	3 - 5	ASWH ^{(a.e.t.)}	2 - 2	1 - 3
VVOG	5 - 4	DOVO	4 - 3	1 - 1
Huizen	1 - 0	Achilles Veen	0 - 0	1 - 0
ACV	2 - 3	Rijnvogels	1 - 0	1 - 3

=== Sunday ===
Team 1	Agg.	Team 2	1st leg	2nd leg
Be Quick 1887	5 - 4	DHC	4 - 0	1 - 4
EHC	2 - 7	Quick '20	0 - 1	2 - 6
Oss '20	5 - 6	De Dijk	3 - 3	2 - 3
Sneek Wit Zwart	2 - 5	UDI '19	2 - 2	0 - 3
OFC	5 - 0	De Bataven	2 - 0	3 - 0

== Season Statistics ==
=== Top scorers ===
Up to and including matches played on 14 and 16 April 2016.

Rank	Player	Club	Goals
1	(Netherlands) Ali Akla	DVS '33	17
1	(Netherlands) Wesley Meeuwsen	De Treffers	17
3	(Netherlands) Marciano Mengerink	Katwijk	16
4	(Netherlands) Daniël Esajas	Barendrecht	15
4	(Netherlands) Yumé Ramos	ONS Sneek	15
4	(Netherlands) Danny van den Meiracker	Spakenburg	15
7	(Netherlands) Olivier Pilon	GVVV	14
7	(Netherlands) Rob van der Leij	HHC	14
7	(Netherlands) Ilias Zaimi	JVC Cuijk	14
10	(Netherlands) Pieter Koopman	AFC	13
10	(Netherlands) Daan Sutorius	AFC	13
10	(Netherlands) Mike van de Ban	HFC	13
