= 2004–05 Eerste Klasse =

Eerste Klasse
- Season: 2004–5
- Relegated: 2005–06 Tweede Klasse

2004–05 Eerste Klasse was a Dutch association football season of the Eerste Klasse.

Saturday champions were:

- A: GVVV
- B: DOTO
- C: VV Kloetinge
- D: SVZW Wierden
- E: Drachtster Boys

Sunday champions were:

- A: FC Hilversum
- B: VVSB
- C: VV Papendrecht
- D: SV Panningen
- E: WSV Apeldoorn
- F: Sneek Wit Zwart
