= Bakarbessy =

Bakarbessy is a Moluccan surname. Notable people with the surname include:

- Jamarro Diks Bakarbessy (born 1995), Dutch footballer
- Kevin Diks Bakarbessy (born 1996), Dutch-Indonesian footballer
