= 2014–15 Topklasse =

5th season of the third-tier football league in the Netherlands

Topklasse
- Season: 2014–15
- Champions: Overall: Lienden; Sat: Kozakken Boys; Sun: Lienden
- Relegated: Sat: Hoek, Ajax (amateurs), Sparta Nijkerk, Genemuiden; Sun: ADO '20, Leonidas, EDO

The 2014–15 Topklasse season was the fifth season of the third tier Dutch football league. A total of 32 teams participated: 24 from the 2012–13 Topklasse, and the remaining eight from the 2013–14 Hoofdklasse. As usual, the competition is divided into two leagues: "Saturday" and "Sunday", who differ by the day their games are usually played.

For the fourth consecutive season, no team was relegated from the Eerste Divisie, this time because all 2013–14 Topklasse teams had declined promotion into professionalism.

== Teams ==
=== Saturday league ===
Location of teams in the Saturday Topklasse 2014-15

Club	City	2013–14 season
Ajax (amateurs)	Amsterdam	Hoofdklasse Playoff Winners
Barendrecht	Barendrecht	11th in Topklasse Saturday
Capelle	Capelle aan den IJssel	12th in Topklasse Saturday
Excelsior Maassluis	Maassluis	6th in Topklasse Saturday
Genemuiden	Genemuiden	1st in Hoofdklasse Saturday C
GVVV	Veenendaal	2nd in Topklasse Saturday
HHC Hardenberg	Hardenberg	3rd in Topklasse Saturday
Hoek	Hoek	1st in Hoofdklasse Saturday B
Kozakken Boys	Werkendam	7th in Topklasse Saturday
Lisse	Lisse	8th in Topklasse Saturday
ONS Sneek	Sneek	10th in Topklasse Saturday
Rijnsburgse Boys	Rijnsburg	5th in Topklasse Saturday
Scheveningen	Scheveningen (The Hague)	9th in Topklasse Saturday
Spakenburg	Bunschoten-Spakenburg	1st in Topklasse Saturday
Sparta Nijkerk	Nijkerk	1st in Hoofdklasse Saturday A
IJsselmeervogels	Bunschoten-Spakenburg	4th in Topklasse Saturday

=== Sunday league ===
Location of teams in the Sunday Topklasse 2014-15

Club	City	2013–14 season
ADO '20	Heemskerk	8th in Topklasse Sunday
AFC	Amsterdam	1st in Topklasse Sunday
EDO	Haarlem	Hoofdklasse Playoff Winners
De Treffers	Groesbeek	11th in Topklasse Sunday
EVV	Echt	5th in Topklasse Sunday
HBS Craeyenhout	The Hague	6th in Topklasse Sunday
Hercules	Utrecht	1st in Hoofdklasse Sunday C
HSC '21	Haaksbergen	9th in Topklasse Sunday
Koninklijke HFC	Haarlem	1st in Hoofdklasse Sunday A
JVC Cuijk	Cuijk	4th in Topklasse Sunday
Leonidas	Rotterdam	7th in Topklasse Sunday
Lienden	Lienden	10th in Topklasse Sunday
OJC Rosmalen	Rosmalen	1st in Hoofdklasse Sunday B
UNA	Veldhoven	2nd in Topklasse Sunday
VVSB	Noordwijkerhout	3rd in Topklasse Sunday
WKE	Emmen	12th in Topklasse Sunday

== League tables ==
=== Saturday league ===
Pos	Team	Pld	W	D	L	GF	GA	GD	Pts	Qualification or relegation
1	Kozakken Boys	30	19	2	9	70	41	+29	59	Advance to the championship final
2	Spakenburg	30	16	8	6	65	37	+28	56	
3	HHC Hardenberg	30	15	8	7	57	31	+26	53	
4	Barendrecht	30	14	9	7	44	31	+13	51	
5	IJsselmeervogels	30	14	6	10	48	40	+8	48	
6	GVVV	30	14	4	12	56	46	+10	46	
7	Rijnsburgse Boys	30	13	7	10	41	41	0	46	
8	Capelle	30	12	8	10	41	37	+4	44	
9	Scheveningen	30	10	9	11	54	51	+3	39	
10	Excelsior Maassluis	30	11	6	13	37	48	−11	39	
11	Lisse	30	10	6	14	36	47	−11	36	
12	ONS Sneek	30	9	7	14	44	64	−20	34	
13	Hoek (R)	30	8	8	14	39	51	−12	32	Qualification to the relegation play-offs
14	Ajax (amateurs) (R)	30	6	10	14	38	57	−19	28	Relegation to the Hoofdklasse
15	Sparta Nijkerk (R)	30	6	10	14	41	64	−23	28	Relegation to the Hoofdklasse
16	Genemuiden (R)	30	6	6	18	51	76	−25	24	Relegation to the Hoofdklasse

Rules for classification: 1) points
(R) Relegated

=== Sunday league ===
Pos	Team	Pld	W	D	L	GF	GA	GD	Pts	Qualification or relegation
1	Lienden (C)	30	18	8	4	65	33	+32	62	Advance to the championship final
2	UNA	30	17	7	6	70	41	+29	58	
3	VVSB	30	16	6	8	67	48	+19	54	
4	De Treffers	30	13	8	9	62	45	+17	47	
5	JVC Cuijk	30	14	5	11	58	46	+12	47	
6	Koninklijke HFC	30	13	8	9	56	49	+7	47	
7	EVV	30	12	10	8	33	28	+5	46	
8	WKE	30	12	7	11	62	60	+2	43	
9	OJC Rosmalen	30	10	10	10	41	42	−1	40	
10	AFC	30	10	10	10	37	41	−4	40	
11	HSC '21	30	11	6	13	63	54	+9	39	
12	Hercules	30	10	9	11	41	49	−8	39	
13	HBS Craeyenhout (O)	30	9	8	13	53	51	+2	35	Qualification to the relegation play-offs
14	ADO '20 (R)	30	8	5	17	48	78	−30	29	Relegation to the Hoofdklasse
15	Leonidas (R)	30	6	5	19	43	87	−44	23	Relegation to the Hoofdklasse
16	EDO (R)	30	2	6	22	33	80	−47	12	Relegation to the Hoofdklasse

Rules for classification: 1) points
(C) Champions; (O) Play-off winners; (R) Relegated

== Championship final ==
23 May 2015

Kozakken Boys	0-1	Lienden
	Report

Sportpark De Zwaaier, Werkendam
30 May 2015

Lienden	2-0	Kozakken Boys
	Report

Sportpark De Abdijhof, Lienden

Lienden won overall Topklasse title 3-0 on aggregate.

== Promotion/relegation play-offs ==
=== Topklasse / Hoofdklasse playoff first round ===
In the first round the 3 period winners of each Hoofdklasse league decide which of them 3 continues in the semifinal. For details see Promotion/relegation play-off Topklasse - Hoofdklasse.

In the second/semifinal round, the 3 winners from the 3 Saturday Hoofdklasse leagues are joined with the team ranked 13th in the Saturday Topklasse league to play for 1 spot in the 2014–15 Topklasse Saturday league. Likewise, the 3 winners from the 3 Sunday Hoofdklasse leagues are joined with the team ranked 13th in the Sunday Topklasse league to play for 1 spot in the 2015–16 Topklasse Sunday league.

=== Topklasse / Hoofdklasse playoff semifinals ===
Team 1	Agg.	Team 2	1st leg	2nd leg
DOVO	1 - 3	Hoek	0 - 0	1 - 3
ACV	3 - 5	RVVH	2 - 3	1 - 2
HBS Craeyenhout	6 - 1	MSC	3 - 0	3 - 1
Oss '20	1 - 2	Vlissingen	0 - 0	1 - 2

=== Topklasse / Hoofdklasse playoff finals ===
Team 1	Score	Team 2
RVVH	3 - 1	Hoek
HBS Craeyenhout	3 - 1	Vlissingen

RVVH and HBS Craeyenhout promoted to the 2015–16 Topklasse.
