= 2014–15 Eerste Klasse =

Eerste Klasse
- Season: 2014–15

2014–15 Eerste Klasse was a Dutch association football season of the Eerste Klasse.

Saturday champions were:

- SVL Langbroek
- Sportlust '46
- SV Heinenoord
- DOS '37
- HZVV

Sunday champions were:

- VV De Meern
- RKAVV
- RKSV Halsteren
- EHC Hoensbroek
- VV Alverna
- Dieze West
