= Marinus Dijkhuizen =

Dutch footballer

Personal information
- Date of birth: 4 January 1972 (age 54)
- Place of birth: 's-Gravenzande, Netherlands
- Height: 1.98 m (6 ft 6 in)
- Position: Forward

Team information
- Current team: VVV-Venlo (head coach)

Youth career
- 1977–1993: 's-Gravenzandse SV
- 1993–1994: Excelsior Maassluis

Senior career*
Years	Team	Apps	(Gls)
1994–1996	Excelsior	66	(28)
1996–1999	Cambuur	90	(26)
1999–2002	Utrecht	28	(4)
2000–2001	→ Dunfermline Athletic (loan)	9	(1)
2001–2002	→ Emmen (loan)	3	(1)
2002–2005	TOP Oss	83	(30)
2005–2006	Excelsior	44	(8)
2007–2008	Cambuur	42	(7)
Total		365	(105)

Managerial career
- 2009–2012: Montfoort
- 2012–2014: De Meern
- 2014–2015: Excelsior
- 2015: Brentford
- 2015–2016: NAC
- 2017: Cambuur
- 2018: Utrecht (caretaker)
- 2020–2024: Excelsior
- 2025–2026: De Graafschap
- 2026–: VVV-Venlo
- * Club domestic league appearances and goals

Marinus Dijkhuizen (born 4 January 1972) is a Dutch professional football manager and former player who is head coach of Eerste Divisie club VVV-Venlo.

As a player, Dijkhuizen had notable spells as a forward in his native Netherlands with Excelsior, Cambuur and TOP Oss. He retired as a player in 2009 and entered management with Dutch lower league clubs VV Montfoort and then VV De Meern. Since 2014, Dijkhuizen has managed Excelsior (twice), Brentford, NAC, Cambuur, De Graafschap and VVV-Venlo.

== Playing career ==
Dijkhuizen was born in 's-Gravenzande. A forward, he spent the majority of his 14-year professional career in the top two divisions of Dutch football, most notably with two spells at both Excelsior and Cambuur. He was a part of the SC Cambuur team which secured promotion to the Eredivisie in the 1997–98 season and later played top-flight football with Utrecht. He had a loan spell with Scottish Premier League club Dunfermline Athletic during the 2000–01 season. He retired at the end of the 2008–09 season after a player-coach spell at hometown club 's-Gravenzandse SV.

== Coaching career ==
=== 's-Gravenzandse SV ===
In 2008, Dijkhuizen took up a coaching role at Eerste Klasse club 's-Gravenzandse SV, the club where he began his career. He left the club in 2009.

=== Utrecht ===
During the 2012–13 Eredivisie season, Dijkhuizen worked as a forward coach at former club Utrecht. In January 2018, he returned to the club as assistant to manager Jean-Paul de Jong. Dijkhuizen served as interim manager of the club for one match early in the 2018–19 season, following the sacking of de Jong and prior to the appointment of Dick Advocaat. Dijkhuizen remained in his assistant manager and video analyst role until January 2020.

== Managerial career ==
=== VV Montfoort ===
Dijkhuizen began his managerial career with Eerste Klasse Saturday club VV Montfoort in 2009. He led the club to two successive promotions in the 2009–10 and 2010–11 seasons, taking the club to the Topklasse. He departed at the end of the 2011–12 season.

=== VV De Meern ===
Dijkhuizen signed a two-year contract with Derde Klasse Sunday club VV De Meern in January 2012. After officially starting work on 1 July 2012, he managed the club until December 2013.

=== Excelsior ===
On 1 January 2014, Dijkhuizen was announced as manager of Eerste Divisie club Excelsior on a contract running until the end of the 2013–14 season. He took over from Jon Dahl Tomasson, who had departed for Eredivisie club Roda JC. Starting out in seventh position in the table, Dijkhuizen encouraged the club to be more attacking and pushed striker Lars Veldwijk further forward. Veldwijk's 17 goals since the Dijkhuizen's arrival helped fire the Kralingers to third-place in the table and promotion to the Eredivisie, after a 4–2 aggregate victory over RKC Waalwijk in the playoffs. The club endured a difficult 2014–15 season in the top-flight, finishing one place above the relegation zone, though a new defensive style contributed to 14 draws, the most in the division. Dijkhuizen departed the club in May 2015, despite having signed a new two-year contract in December 2014.

=== Brentford ===
On 1 June 2015, Dijkhuizen was announced as head coach of English Championship club Brentford, replacing Mark Warburton. He installed former SC Cambuur teammate Roy Hendriksen as his assistant. Dijkhuizen had a difficult first week of the 2015–16 season and began the campaign with a crippling lack of players through injury and outgoing transfers, which caused disharmony amongst the club's supporters. Problems with a poor pitch at Griffin Park compounded the injury problems. After two wins, two draws and five defeats from the first nine matches of the season, Dijkhuizen and Hendriksen parted company with Brentford on 28 September 2015. Brentford co-director of football Rasmus Ankersen later revealed that the club "made a mistake" in hiring Dijkhuizen and that the decision to part company "was based on three months of training and there were some fundamental processes, in terms of getting a full football operation to work to its maximum, that weren't at the level we wanted them to be".

=== NAC Breda ===
On 26 October 2015, Dijkhuizen was announced as head coach of Eerste Divisie club NAC Breda. He guided the club to the third round of the promotion/relegation playoffs, but lost over two legs to the promoted club Willem II. With the club struggling to compete after 18 matches of the 2016–17 season, Dijkhuizen was sacked on 23 December 2016.

=== Cambuur ===
On 9 May 2017, Dijkhuizen returned to Eerste Divisie club Cambuur and took up the position of head coach on a one-year contract. He was sacked on 28 November 2017, after taking just 14 points from the opening 15 matches of the 2017–18 season.

=== Return to Excelsior ===
On 29 January 2020, Dijkhuizen returned to Eerste Divisie club Excelsior on a 2 1/2-year contract. Following the COVID-19-affected 2019–20 season and a finish outside the playoffs in 2020–21, Dijkhuizen secured promotion to the Eredivise with victory over ADO Den Haag in the 2021–22 Eredivisie promotion/relegation playoff Final. He signed a new one-year contract in April 2022 and a further 18-month extension in December 2022. A narrow finish above the relegation places in the 2022–23 season was followed by a relegation playoff final defeat in 2023–24. Dijkhuizen departed the club by mutual consent in June 2024.

=== De Graafschap ===
On 6 January 2025, Dijkhuizen signed a 2 1/2-year contract with Eerste Divisie club De Graafschap. He led the club to promotion-playoff finishes in the 2024–25 and 2025–26 seasons, with both campaigns failing to yield promotion. Dijkhuizen departed the club in June 2026.

=== VVV-Venlo ===
On 5 June 2026, Dijkhuizen signed a two-year contract with Eerste Divisie club VVV-Venlo.

== Other work ==
From 2008 to 2012, Dijkhuizen worked as an analyst for Excelsior, researching and providing data on the club's upcoming opponents.

== Personal life ==
Dijkhuizen's brother Marc is also involved in football and the pair worked together on the coaching staff at 's-Gravenzandse SV during the 2008–09 season.

== Career statistics ==
Appearances and goals by club, season and competition
Club	Season	League			National cup (Note: Includes KNVB Cup, Scottish Cup)		Total	
Club	Season	Division	Apps	Goals	Apps	Goals	Apps	Goals
Cambuur	1998–99	Eredivisie	30	7	4	4	34	11
Utrecht	1999–00	Eredivisie	27	4	5	2	32	6
Utrecht	2000–01	Eredivisie	1	0	0	0	1	0
Utrecht	Total		28	4	5	2	33	6
Dunfermline Athletic (loan)	2000–01	Scottish Premier League	9	1	4	1	13	2
Emmen (loan)	2001–02	Eerste Divisie	3	1	—		3	1
TOP Oss	2002–03	Eerste Divisie	32	10	0	0	32	10
TOP Oss	2003–04	Eerste Divisie	17	11	0	0	17	11
TOP Oss	2004–05	Eerste Divisie	34	9	0	0	34	9
TOP Oss	Total		83	30	0	0	83	30
Excelsior	2005–06	Eerste Divisie	33	7	0	0	33	7
Excelsior	2006–07	Eredivisie	11	1	0	0	11	1
Excelsior	Total		44	8	0	0	44	8
Cambuur	2006–07	Eerste Divisie	13	2	—		13	2
Cambuur	2007–08	Eerste Divisie	29	5	1	0	30	5
Cambuur	Total		72	14	5	0	77	14
Career total			239	58	14	7	253	65

== Honours ==
=== As a player ===
Cambuur

- Eerste Divisie play-offs: 1997–98

Excelsior

- Eerste Divisie: 2005–06

=== As a manager ===
VV Montfoort

- Hoofdklasse third-place promotion: 2010–11
- Eerste Klasse third-place promotion: 2009–10

Excelsior

- Eerste Divisie play-offs: 2013–14
- Eredivisie promotion/relegation play-offs: 2021–22
