= Jamarro Diks =

Dutch footballer (born 1995)

Personal information
- Full name: Jamarro Diks Bakarbessy
- Date of birth: 24 June 1995 (age 31)
- Place of birth: Apeldoorn, Netherlands
- Height: 1.83 m (6 ft 0 in)
- Position: Winger

Team information
- Current team: RKHVV

Youth career
- VIOS Vaassen
- AGOVV
- Vitesse
- AGOVV
- –2013: Groen Wit '62

Senior career*
Years	Team	Apps	(Gls)
2013–2016	WSV Apeldoorn		
2016	AS Trenčín	4	(0)
2017	GVVV	8	(0)
2017–2018	CSV Apeldoorn	11	(2)
2019–2021	Excelsior '31	25	(8)
2021–2023	AVV Columbia	0	(0)
2023–	RKHVV	0	(0)
- * Club domestic league appearances and goals as of 19 September 2020

Jamarro Diks Bakarbessy (born 26 June 1995) is a Dutch footballer who plays as a winger for Eerste Klasse club RKHVV.

== Club career ==
=== AS Trenčín ===
Diks started his career with AS Trenčín in Slovakia.

Diks made his professional Fortuna Liga debut for AS Trenčín against Senica on 23 July 2016. In January 2017, Diks returned to Holland to play for amateur side GVVV, but was released by GVVV at the end of the season. In 2019 he joined Excelsior '31 from CSV Apeldoorn. He later played for Columbia and RKHVV.

== Personal life ==
Diks is the older brother of professional footballer Kevin Diks.
