= Alphense Boys =

Association football club in Alphen aan de Rijn, Netherlands

- Founded: 1 June 1930; 96 years ago
- Ground: De Bijlen, Alphen aan den Rijn
- Chairman: Irina van Stijn-Lamur
- Manager: Eli Wattimury
- League: Eerste Klasse (2025–26)
- Website: www.alphenseboys.nl
Home colours

Alphense Boys is a football club based in Alphen aan de Rijn, South Holland, Netherlands. Currently members of the Eerste Klasse, the sixth tier of the Dutch football league system, the club was established in 1930. The club is known for playing major teams in practice games and for its "passionate" supporters, who initiated major brawls over the years.

== History ==
=== 1930s–1970s: Vierde Klasse and minor leagues ===
Alphense Boys was founded on 1 juni 1930. Initially it played in regional leagues.

It joined KNVB's Vierde Klasse in 1946. In 1949, a major fight erupted at its grounds after two players were removed from the field and it had lost 1–4 against VV Hillegom. Supporters fought among themselves, a referee was attacked and a policeman was hit unconscious with a rock. The stone throwing supporter was arrested and Alphen found itself playing back in minor leagues.

In 1967, the Boys played in the Second Regional Division of KNVB Leiden.

In 1977, Alphen rejoined KNVB's Vierde Klasse. First season, in 1978 it already ended second. In 1979 it promoted to the Derde Klasse after its first section championship.

=== 1980s: From Derde to Eerste Klasse ===
Also in the Derde Klasse, Alphen excelled. It immediately finished 5th in 1980. In 1981, it ended 4th. Only 3 years after promoting, in 1982, it won the Derde Klasse section championship and promoted to the Tweede Klasse.

In the Tweede Klasse, Alphen continued to succeed, although here it took somewhat longer to become champion and promote. In 1983, it ended 5th, in 1984 3rd, in 1985 6th, in 1986 5th, and in 1987 4th. In 1988, it took the section championship and reached the Eerste Klasse for the very first time.

Success was not over. In its first season in the Eerste Klasse, Alphen ended 2nd.

=== 1990s–2000s: To Hoofdklasse and back to the Tweede ===
In 1990 Alphense Boys finished the season in 3rd position. In 1991 it already won the section championship and promoted for the very first time to the Hoofdklasse. In 1992 it ended its first Hoofdklasse season in a promising 6th position. In 1993 it already reached 3rd place. In the 1993–1994 season, Alphen's luck changed, ending the season in a disappointing 10th position. In 1995 it ended 14th and relegated. Back in the Eerste Klasse, it didn't do well either, finishing 8th in 1996 and 10th in 1997. That year it relegated to the Tweede Klasse.

The second term in the Tweede Klasse was Alphen's most stable period to date. It finished 8th in 2001, 7th in 1998, 1999, and 2007, 5th in 2002, 2004, 2005, and 2007, 4th in 2000, and 2nd in 2003. In 2000 Alphense Boys lost 0−12 to the Glasgow Rangers in a friendly game at the Boys grounds. In 2009 Alphen won the 1st place and found itself once again in Eerste Klasse.

=== 2010s: Eerste Klasse and Hoofdklasse ===
In 2011 Alphen lost 0−1 to VV Montfoort in a game for the Dutch national cup.

In 2013 the KNVB relegated Alphense Boys to the Eerste Klasse after a massive fight on the football field, immediately after the playoff match against Haaglandia in which Alphen lost its chance for promotion to the Topklasse. The club cancelled the membership of five section one players following the events. Six supporters of Alphen were sent to jail.

In the 2023–24 season, Alphense Boys suffered relegation from the Vierde Divisie to the Eerste Klasse.
