= Drachtster Boys =

Football club from Drachten, Netherlands

- Full name: Voetbalvereniging Drachtster Boys
- Founded: 29 March 1948; 78 years ago
- Ground: Drachtster Bos
- Chairman: Gijs Lokhorst
- Manager: Carlo Rietdijk
- League: Eerste Klasse H (2026–27)
Home colours	Away colours

Drachtster Boys is a football club from Drachten, Netherlands. The female squads of the soccer club are extremely successful, winning national titles and cups.

The male squad plays in the 2026–27 season in the Eerste Klasse H (6th flight) after relegation from the Hoofdklasse in 2016. It won section championships in 1973, 1981, 1989, 2005, 2009, and 2013. The squad won the District Cup for amateur clubs in the northern Netherlands three times, in 1983, 1987, 2001. In 1983 it went on to win the National Amateur Cup. This was a first and only among Frisian football clubs.

== History ==
=== 1948–1960s: Local leagues and Vierde Klasse ===
Drachtster Boys was founded on 29 March 1948. Initially it played in local leagues.

In 1957 the male first started playing in KNVB's Vierde Klasse. In 1966 it promoted to the Derde Klasse from a second position in the Vierde.

=== 1970s–1980s: Derde and Tweede Klasse ===
In 1973 Drachtster Boys won their first section championship, in Derde Klasse B, and promoted to the Tweede Klasse. In 1978, after the first season that Foppe de Haan had managed Drachtster Boys, it relegated to the Derde Klasse. De Haan continued the coach the club another 2 years.

One year after De Haan had left, in 1981, it promoted back to the Tweede Klasse. In 1983 Drachtster Boys won the KNVB Districtsbeker, after beating SC Erica 3–0. The same year it won the national amateur cup after beating VV Breskens 2–0. In 1987 it won another District Cup through a victory 3–1 over Meppeler Sport Club, in the extra time. In 1989 the Boys won a section championship in the Tweede Klasse and promoted to the Eerste Klasse.

During the 1970s and until 1984, Pieter Huistra played for the youth teams of Drachtster Boys. He started his professional career at nearby FC Groningen.

=== 1990s–2010s: Eerste Klasse and Hoofdklasse ===
Since 1989 Drachtster Boys have been playing in the Eerste Klasse and Hoofdklasse, winning Eerste Klasse championships in 2005 and 2013. In 2001 it won 3–2 against VV Sneek and a third District Cup was a fact. Zabih Etemadi played in the first section 2011–12.

In the 2016–17 season the women under 17 team won the championship of the Hoofdklasse. Women indoor soccer won the national title, the national cup and the supercup. In the 2016–17 season an asylum seeker played in the male selection of Drachtster Boys but disappeared after being denied refugee status.

Ard Veenhof (transfer from Oranje Nassau Groningen) and Said Hassan (signed anew) will play in the Drachtster Eerste Klasse selection in 2017–18.
