= Achterberg =

- Village
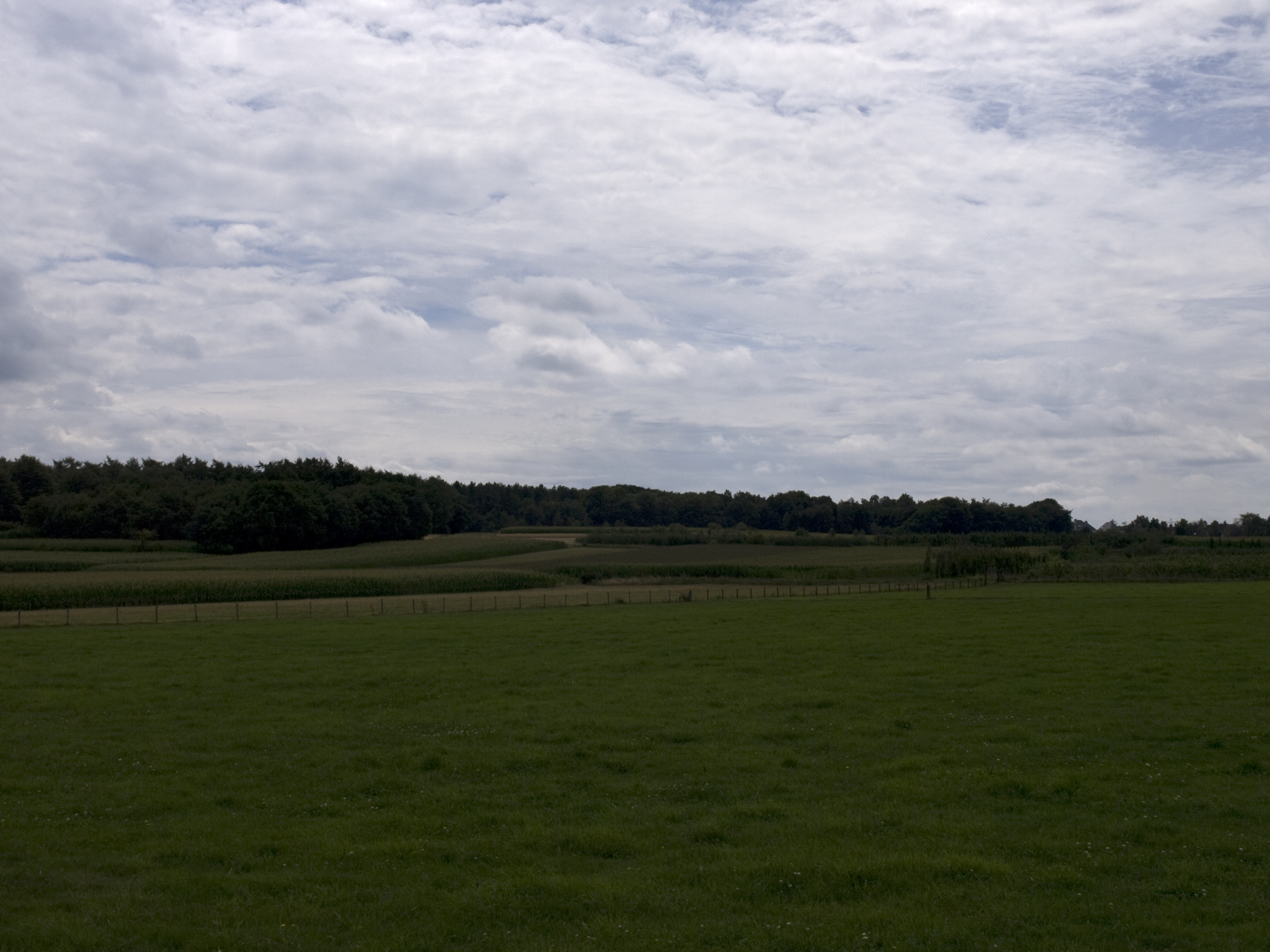
- Corn fields in the direction of Rhenen, seen from Achterberg

- Location in the Netherlands Achterberg (Netherlands)
- Coordinates: 51°58′18″N 5°35′8″E
- Country: Netherlands
- Province: Utrecht
- Municipality: Rhenen

Area
  - Total: 0.38 km^{2} (0.15 sq mi)
- Elevation: 15 m (49 ft)

Population (2021)
  - Total: 1,670
  - Density: 4,400/km^{2} (11,000/sq mi)
- Time zone: UTC+1 (CET)
  - Summer (DST): UTC+2 (CEST)
- Postal code: 3911
- Dialing code: 0317

Achterberg is a village in the Dutch province of Utrecht. It is part of the municipality of Rhenen and it lies about 5 km west of Wageningen.

The village was first mentioned in 1417 as Achterbergh, and means "(settlement) behind the hill". Achterberg developed as an esdorp on the northern flank of a hill near castle Ter Horst. The castle was built in 1160 and demolished in 1528. In 1840, Achterberg was home to 1,043 people. In 1940, the village was the scene of heavy fighting during the Battle of the Grebbeberg. The grist mill Crescendo was built in 1886 and destroyed in 1945 during a battle.

== Gallery ==
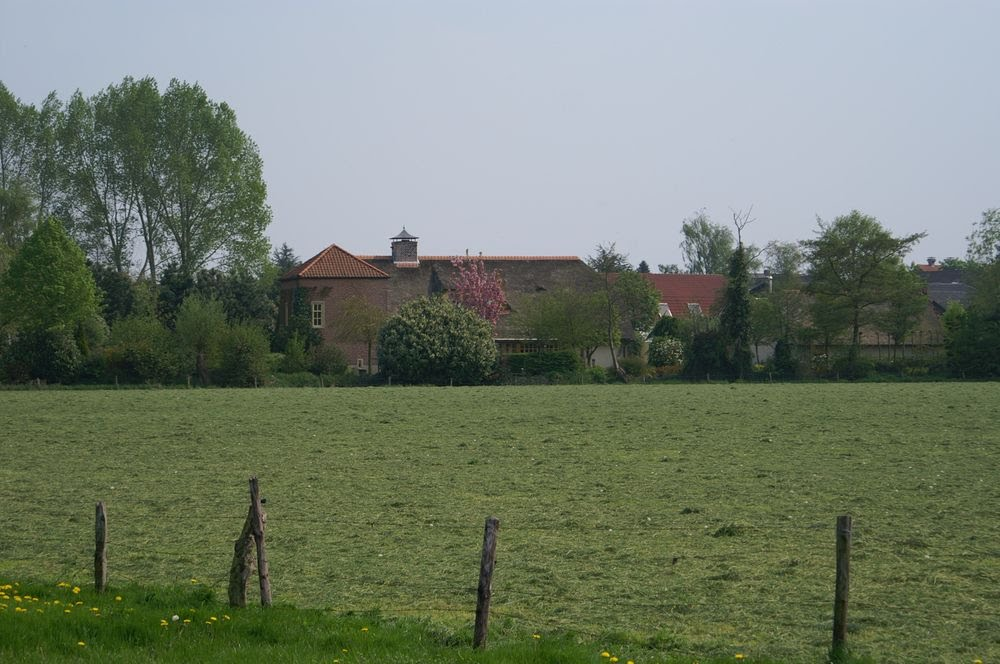
Estate Stuivenes

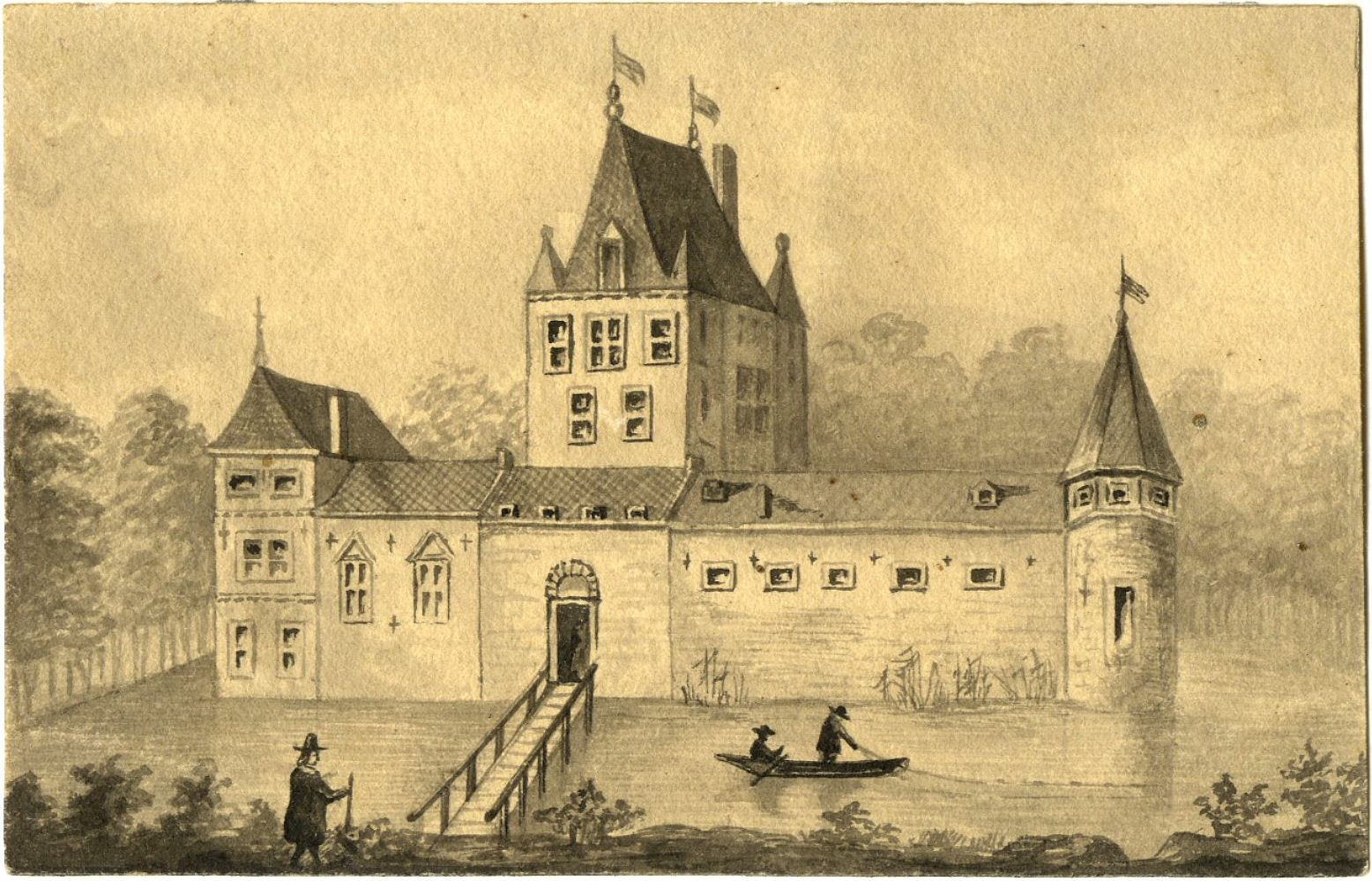
Former castle Ter Horst (16th century)

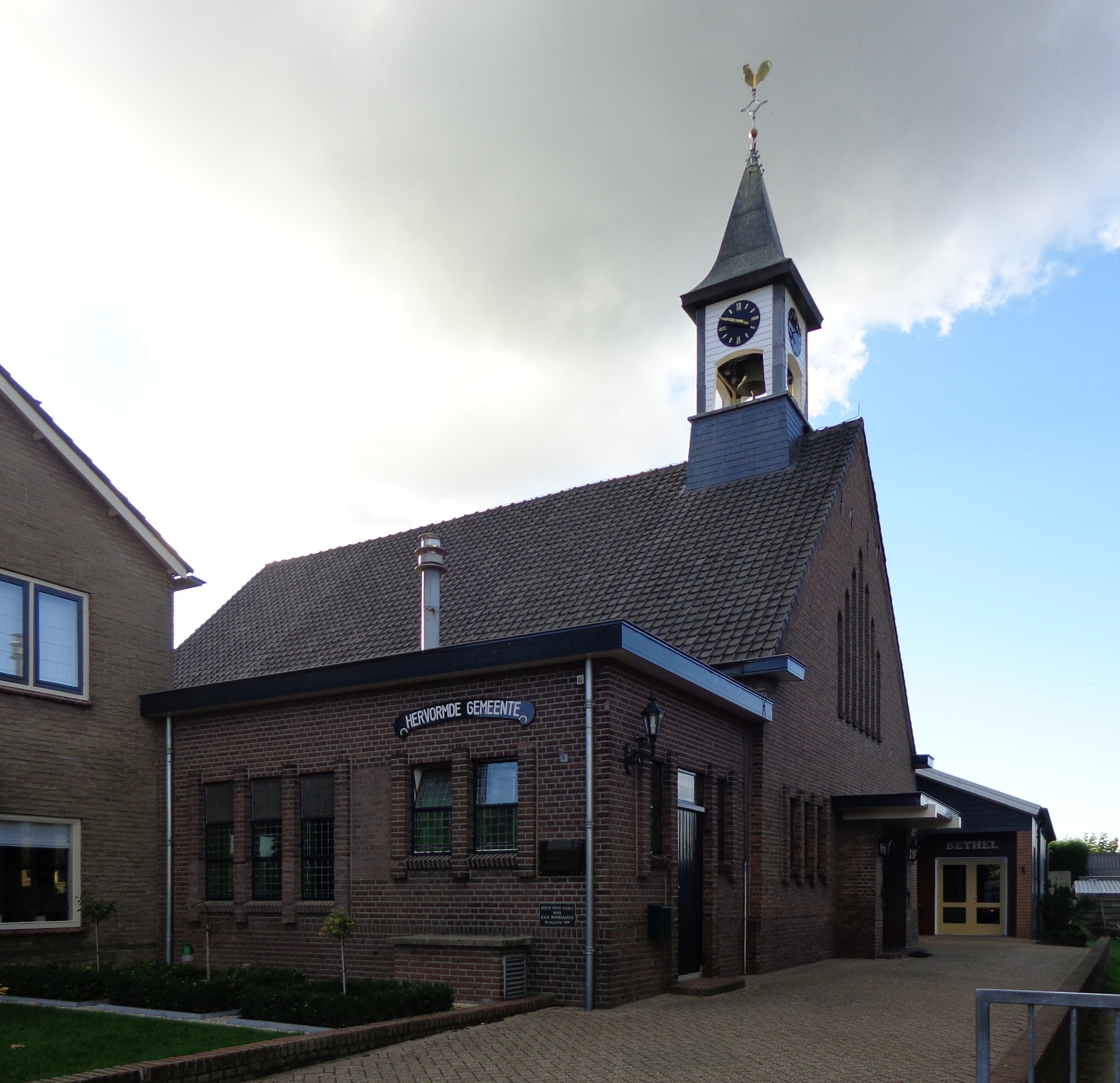
Church of Achterberg

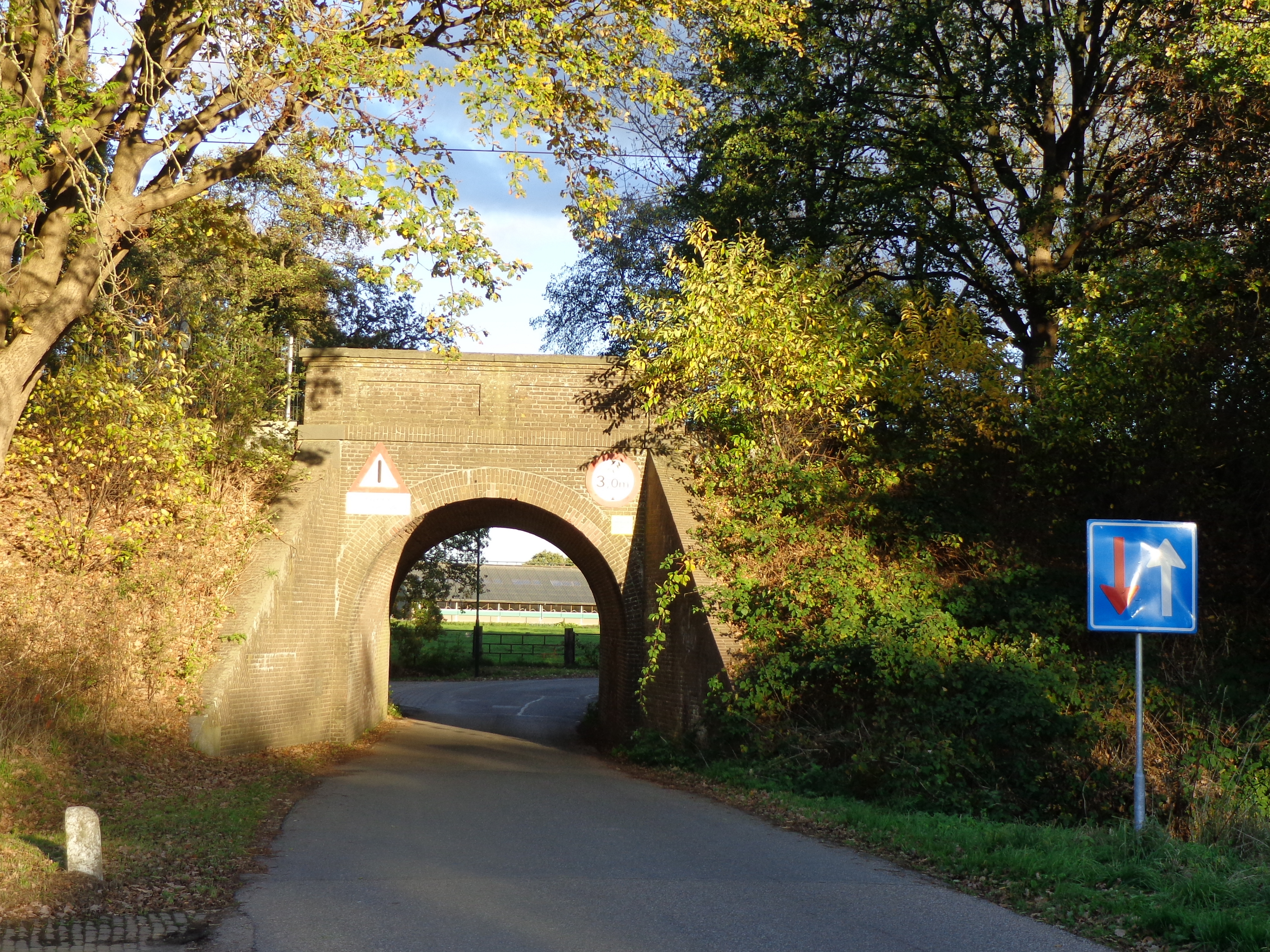
Railway bridge
