= Montvoort SV '19 =

Dutch football club

MSV '19
- Full name: Montfoort Samen Verder '19
- Founded: 19 July 1919
- Ground: Sportpark Hofland
- League: Eerste Klasse Saturday
colours

Montfoort Samen Verder 2019 (MSV '19) is an association football club from Montfoort, Netherlands that was founded on 19 July 2019 out of a merger between Voetbalvereniging Montfoort (founded 30 July 1946) and the Montfoortse Sportvereniging 1919 (founded 1919). The first male squad of MSV '19 plays in the Eerste Klasse since foundation, continuing VV Montfoort's league since 2015.

== History ==
=== Montfoortse Sportvereniging 1919 ===
This Sunday football club was founded on 19 July 1919. In 2019 it merged with VV Montfoort into Montfoort Samen Verder '19. It played on Sportpark Hofland in the Hofland neighborhood. The club played in the Vierde Klasse and Derde Klasse during most of its existence. It also played in lower leagues and never made it to the Tweede Klasse. Colors were the simple white shirt and black pants, a combination that clubs initially chose to save money for potential players.

=== Voetbalvereniging Montfoort ===
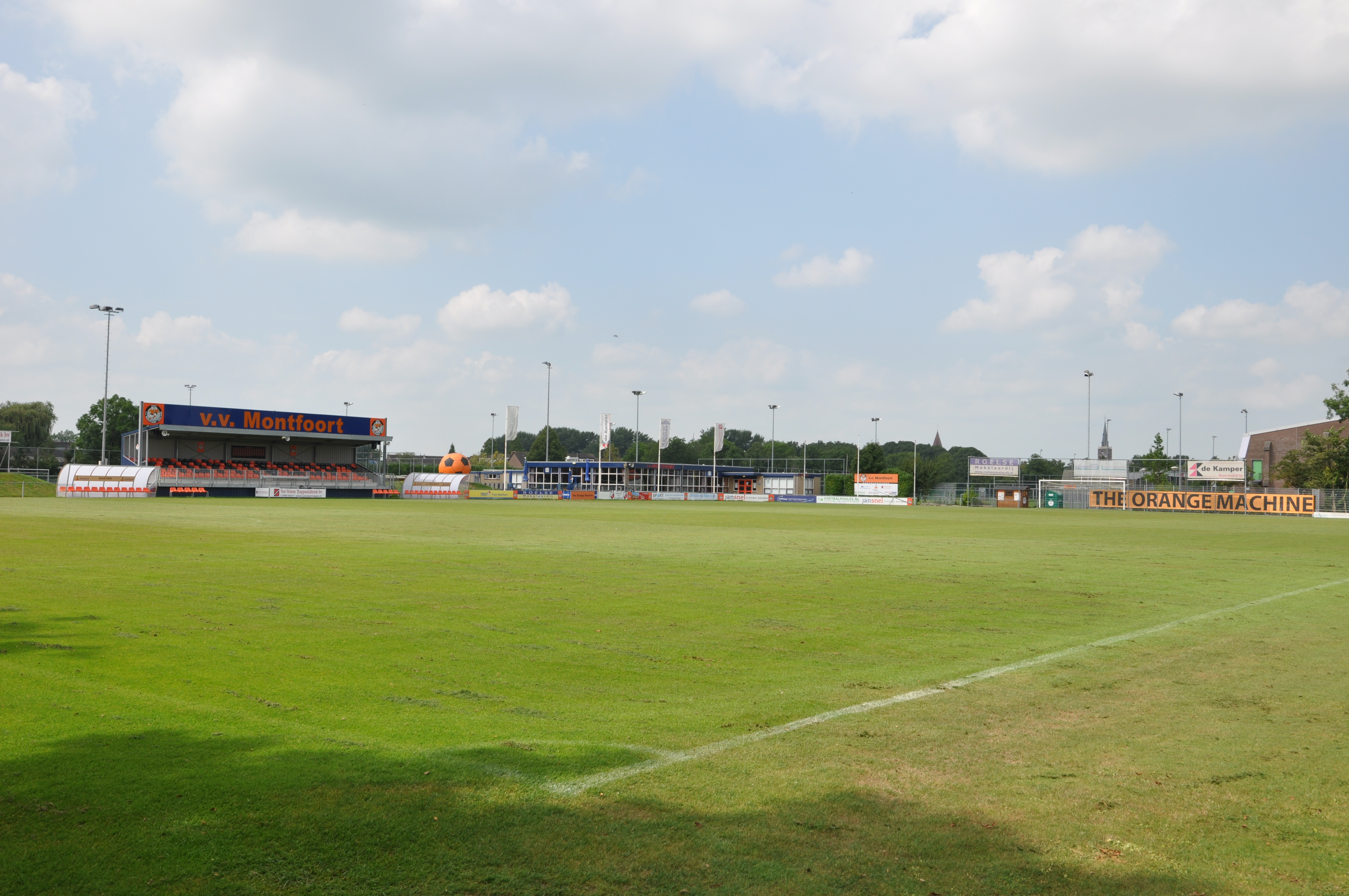
VV Montfoort's grounds with its nickname, The Orange Machine, written on a sign

==== 20th century ====
Voetbalvereniging Montfoort was founded on 30 July 1946. Until 1994 its first squad played mainly in local leagues, with shorter periods spent in KNVB's Derde and Vierde Klasse. In 1994 it rejoined the Vierde Klasse, promoting to the Derde Klasse in 1995. In 1996 It won the section championship, then promoted to Eerste Klasse, skipping the Tweede Klasse. Its kit consisted of an orange shirt, black shorts and orange socks, leading to the nickname "The Orange Machine".

==== 21st century ====
From 1996 through 2010 Montfoort played in the Eerste Klasse with a short interlude in the Tweede Klasse between 2003 and 2005. In 2010 Montfoort reached for the very first time the Hoofdklasse. One year later it promoted to Topklasse from 3rd position Hoofdklasse. It finished 15th in the Topklasse and relegated after only one year in the league. During the years 2012–15 Montfoort played in the Hoofdklasse.

In the National 2011–12 KNVB Cup Montfoort won 0–1 over Alphense Boys from a goal by Nick Koppers in minute 83. In the second round it lost 1–6 to Sparta Rotterdam, with Andy van Vliet scoring the only goal for Montfoort in minute 69. In the National 2011–12 KNVB Cup Montfoort won first round over De Treffers from Groesbeek, 4–5 from penalty shots, after the game and extra time had ended 1–1. The Montfoort goal in the game was by Miquel Ballo in minute 57. While playing VV Staphorst in the second round, Montfoort player Joost van Apeldoorn was sent off with a red card in minute 59. With one more player on the field, Staphorst scored twice and went on to the third round.

From 2015 to 2019 VV Montfoort was back in the Eerste Klasse.

=== Montfoort Samen Verder '19 ===
De club was founded in 2019 as a merger between Saturday club VV Montfoort and Sunday Club MSV '19. 19 July 1919, the day that MSV was established, is the official foundation date. The team continued to play on the ticket of VV Montfoort in the Eerste Klasse and uses its facilities.

== Chief coach ==
=== VV Montfoort ===
- 1995–1996: Ton du Chatinier
- 200?–2009: Herman Schreurs
- 2009–2012: Marinus Dijkhuizen
- 2014–2015: Masies Artien
- 2013–2015: Armand Neeskens
