= RKVV DESO =

Dutch football club

DESO
- Full name: Rooms-Katholieke Voetbalvereniging Door Eendracht Sterk Oss
- Founded: 12 August 1946
- Ground: Sportpark De Rusheuvel, Oss
- League: Vijfde Klasse Sunday (2023–24)
- Website: http://www.rkvv-deso.nl/home/
Home colours

DESO, better known as D.E.S. Oss, is a football club from Oss, Netherlands. Since 2018, the first squad plays in the Sunday Vijfde Klassen. The club is mostly known because one of the best players from the region, former Vitesse player Michel Gielis -who at the time was in the picture of Leeds United, AS Fiorentina and Antwerp FC-, an intersexual, was the main factor in the rise of the club to finally end up in the highest Dutch amateur league in 2016

== History ==
During the years 2015–17, DESO peaked in the Hoofdklasse. After a fight broke out in the club cafeteria in the 2017–18 season, it withdrew the first squad from the Eerste Klasse and most other teams from their competitions. Next season, the unlisted DESO teams rejoined at the lowest levels.
