= SV Nieuw Utrecht =

Dutch football club

- Full name: Sportvereniging Nieuw Utrecht
- Founded: 6 July 1983 (FC Chabab); 28 July 1988 (SV Utrecht Türkiyem Spor)
- Ground: Sportpark Rijnvliet; Utrecht, Netherlands
- Manager: Roy Versluis
- League: Eerste Klasse B
- 2025–26: Tweede Klasse B, 2nd (promoted)
Home colours

Sportvereniging Nieuw Utrecht is a Dutch amateur association football club from Utrecht. Founded in 1988 as Sportvereniging Utrecht Türkiyem Spor, it merged with Football Club Chabab in 2015.

== History ==
SV Utrecht Türkiyem Spor was founded in 1988, and adopted the name SV Nieuw Utrecht in 2011. On 12 May 2015, it merged with FC Chabab, with the resulting club retaining the identity of SV Nieuw Utrecht.

Logo of FC Chabab

FC Chabab home colours

FC Chabab began in 1974 among Moroccan immigrant workers in Amsterdam, and was officially founded in 1983. It was long known for being a team mostly composed by players from the Moroccan community of the city. After spending several years in the lower ranks of Dutch amateur football, it was promoted to the Topklasse in 2012 as playoff winners, under the guidance of former Moroccan international Alami Ahannach. It spent two seasons in the Dutch third tier before being relegated back to the Hoofdklasse after the 2013–14 season. While active in Amsterdam, its stadium was Sportpark Riekerhaven, which was deemed unsuitable. Therefore, after one season in the Hoofdklasse, Chabad merged into SV Nieuw Utrecht in 2015.

== Current squad ==
As of 4 November 2026

Note: Flags indicate national team as defined under FIFA eligibility rules; some limited exceptions apply. Players may hold more than one non-FIFA nationality.

No.	Pos.	Nation	Player
—			
—	GK	TUR	Selahattin Dagasan
—	DF	NED	Bjorn Purperhart
—	DF	NED	Imad Najah
—	DF	NED	Sten Vreekamp
—	DF	TUR	Tufan Özbozkurt
—			
—	DF	NED	Faouzi Ben Yerrou
—	MF	NED	Soeremly Te Vrede
—	MF	TUR	Erkan Altun
—			
—	MF	NED	Mark Pauls
—	MF	MAR	Adil Amghar el Yettefti

No.	Pos.	Nation	Player
—	FW	MAR	Youness Mokhtar
—	FW	MAR	Mohamed Bekkach
—	FW	NED	Metehan Bekgöz
—	FW	TUR	Emre Bal
—	FW	TUR	Ceyhun Sabaoglu
—	FW	NED	Tarik Zaanani
—			
—			
—			
—			
—			
—			
—			
