= VV Haaglandia =

Haaglandia
- Full name: VV Haaglandia
- Founded: 2005
- Dissolved: 2016; 10 years ago
- Ground: Sportpark Prinses Irene; Rijswijk, Netherlands
- Capacity: 3,000
- Chairman: Henk de Haas
- Manager: Edwin Grünholz
- League: Hoofdklasse
- 2013–14: Topklasse Sunday, 13th (relegated)
Home colours

VV Haaglandia was an association football club from Rijswijk, Netherlands.

The club was established on 1 July 2005 through a merger of amateur sides RVC/Rijswijk (who merged years earlier themselves) and FC Kranenburg. It later played in the Hoofdklasse, the fourth tier of Dutch football, after being relegated from the Topklasse at the end of the 2013–14 season.

On 22 September 2009 in a Dutch Cup match against Excelsior Rotterdam, it drew 6–6 and lost on penalties.

In March 2015 it quit Sunday soccer mid-season. On 24 August 2016, the club filed for bankruptcy after losing a court case against the municipality.
