= EHC Hoensbroek =

Association football club in the Netherlands

EHC Heuts
- Full name: Emma Hoensbroek Combinatie
- Nickname(s): EHC
- Founded: 27 September 1917; 108 years ago
- Ground: SportPark de Dem
- Capacity: 2,000
- Manager: Hans Theunissen
- League: Hoofdklasse Sunday A (2019–20)
- 1
Home colours	Away colours

EHC Norad (also known as EHC Hoensbroek Norad or simply EHC) is a Dutch Football Club based in Hoensbroek, Netherlands. The club was founded on 27 September 1917. Its first squad currently plays in the Hoofdklasse.

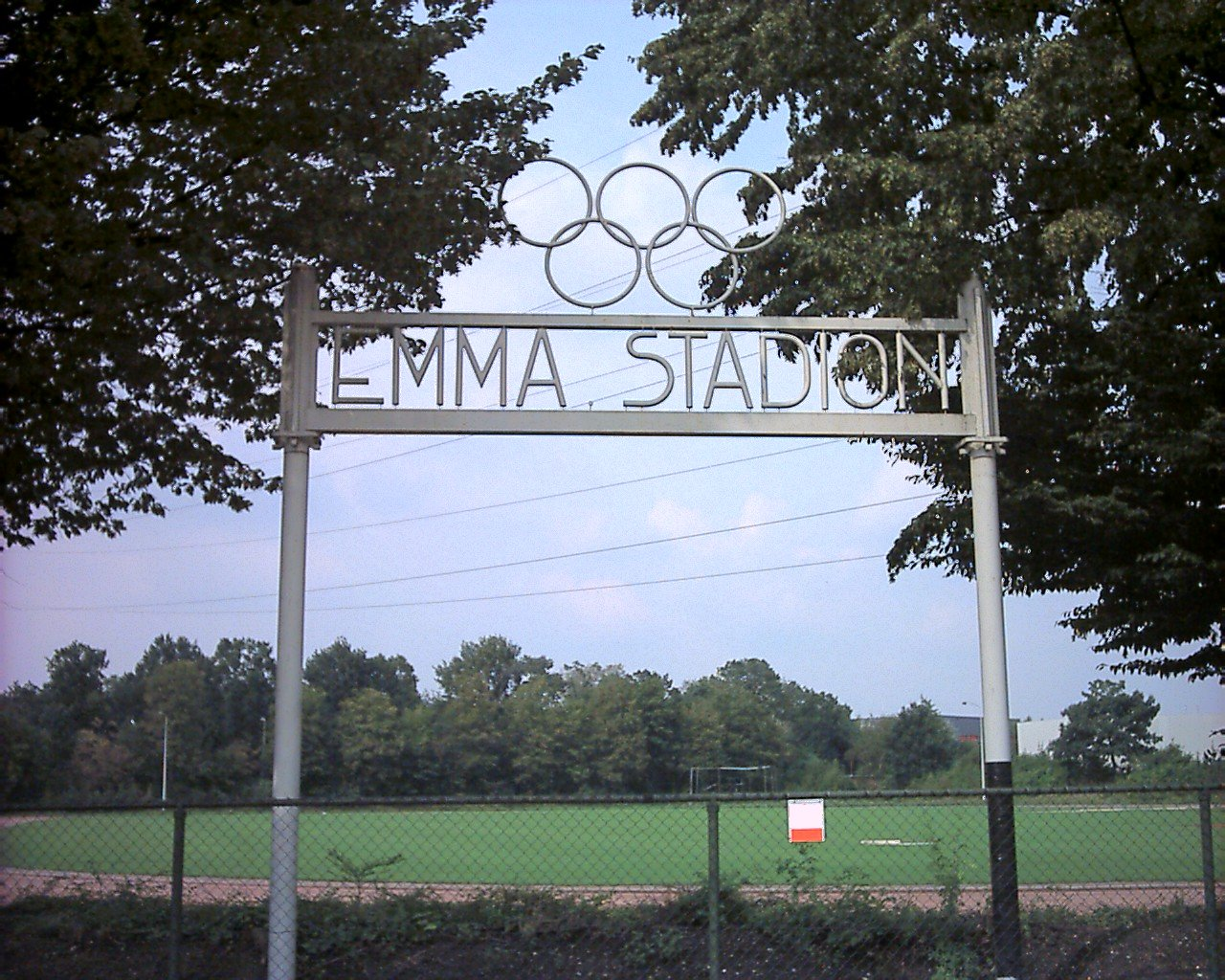
Hoensbroek's Emma Stadion, 2002
