= RKHVV =

Dutch football club

- Full name: Rooms Katholieke Huissense Voetbalvereniging
- Founded: 1 January 1933
- Ground: De Blauwenburcht, Huissen
- League: Eerste Klasse Sunday E (2019–20)
- Website: http://www.rkhvv.nl/
Home colours

RKHVV is a football club from Huissen, Netherlands. RKHVV plays in the 2017–18 Sunday Hoofdklasse A.
