= FC Lienden =

Dutch football club

- Full name: FC Lienden
- Nickname(s): Chelsea van de Betuwe
- Founded: 1 August 1930; 94 years ago
- Ground: Sportpark de Abdijhof; Lienden, Netherlands
- Capacity: 2,400
- Chairman: Sander van Meurs
- Manager: Marcel Nijhuis
- League: Saturday Vierde Klasse A (East) (2024–25)
Home colours	Away colours

FC Lienden is a football club from Lienden, Netherlands. The club was established on 1 August 1930.

== History ==
In the 2010s, the club saw a rise through the Dutch football pyramid, under the guidance of former professional player Hans Kraay Jr., who served as head coach from 2004 to 2011. He returned to Lienden in 2016.

On 12 November 2008 the club gained nationwide attention by defeating Eredivisie squad Vitesse Arnhem by 1–0 in the third round of the national KNVB Cup. In the round of 16 they were defeated 2–0 by Roda JC after extra time.

In 2010 the club was promoted to the Topklasse, the newly established semi-professional Dutch third tier. Starting in season 2016–2017, the club played in the newly established Tweede Divisie. On 18 December 2018 Lienden withdrew from this competition due to financial difficulties but eventually found funds to continue. In 2019 it was knocked out of the Tweede Divisie by ASWH.

On 7 April 2020 Lienden withdrew its Sunday team definitely from the Derde Divisie. The club had financial problems for some time, which, after Lienden indicated that it would no longer sponsor and it was not possible to find a new main sponsor.
