= Meppeler Sport Club =

Dutch football club

MSC
- Full name: Meppeler Sport Club
- Founded: 10 April 1910
- Ground: Sportpark Ezinge, Meppel
- League: Vierde Klasse (2022–23)
- Website: http://www.mscmeppel.nl/
Home colours

MSC is a football club from Meppel, Netherlands.

== History ==
MSC played in the 2017–18 Sunday Hoofdklasse A. and in the 2019–20 Hoofdklasse.

After disbanding its Sunday team, it plays in the Vierde Klasse.
