= VV Sneek Wit Zwart =

Dutch football club

- Full name: Voetbal Vereniging Sneek Wit Zwart
- Founded: 26 November 1910; 112 years ago
- Ground: Tinga Sportpark; Sneek, Netherlands
- Capacity: 5,500
- Manager: (Netherlands) Carlo Rietdijk
- League: Tweede Klasse
- Website: www.swzbososneek.nl/
Home colours	Away colours

Voetbal Vereniging Sneek Wit Zwart (abbreviated SWZ) is a football club from Sneek, Netherlands. They currently play in the Tweede Klasse, the seventh tier of Dutch football.

== History ==
Sneek Wit Zwart was founded on 26 November 1910 as Quick as a club for the working class. In 1912 Brunio merged into the club to become Rood-Blauw. In 1914 the club changed names to VV Sneek. In 1922 Sparta merged into the club and in 1922 the members of Voorwaarts joined.

=== 21st century ===
In 2000, VV Sneek almost went bankrupt. It was kept out of insolvency by the Municipality of Sneek. In 2008, the club merged Wit Zwart Sneek to become Sneek Zwart Wit. In anticipation of a possible merger the youth departments of both clubs had already collaborated since 2005.

Sherida Spitse, the most capped player for the Netherlands women's national football team, started playing football at VV Sneek in 2004. She joined the international squad in 2006 and left Sneek in 2007.

In 2012, Zwart Wit Sneek reached the third round of the 2012–13 KNVB Cup, in which it lost 1–4 to AZ Alkmaar.
