= 2020–21 Derde Divisie =

Derde Divisie
- Season: 2020–21
- Champions: No champions
- Promoted: No team promoted
- Relegated: No team relegated

The 2020–21 Derde Divisie season was the fifth edition of the Dutch fourth tier, formerly called Topklasse, since the restructuring of the league system in the summer of 2016.

== Effects of the 2020 coronavirus pandemic ==
In the previous season, on 31 March 2020, the KNVB decided to cancel all competitions at amateur level. They also decided, for those competitions involved, there would be no final standings, and therefore no champions, no promotions and no relegations. As a result, this season starts with most of the same teams as the previous season.

On 7 April 2020, FC Lienden announced the withdrawal of its Sunday team. The club had run into financial problems for some time after Lienden indicated that it would no longer sponsor the team and it was not possible to find a new main sponsor. On 26 May, ONS Sneek was granted a voluntary demotion to the Hoofdklasse for financial reasons. Also, the two remaining reserve teams, Jong ADO and Jong Almere City, or any other reserves, could no longer play in the Derde Divisie from this season on. In accordance with the decision from KNVB's meeting on 16 December 2019, these two teams are playing in the new under-21 competition.

Later on 12 June, the KNVB officially announced that the Derde Divisie would again consist of 36 teams from next season. This was one wish of CVTD, the interest group of football clubs from the Tweede and Derde Divisies. To fill vacancies and accommodate all teams that led their groups in the Hoofdklasse after the cancellation, the KNVB decided to make each Derde Divisie group have 18 teams. The Hoofdklasse group leaders, namely Sportlust '46, Staphorst, Unitas and Hollandia, therefore moved up to the Derde Divisie. The best runners-up of the Saturday and Sunday Hoofdklasse, Asser Christelijke Voetbalvereniging (ACV) and JOS Watergraafsmeer, were also promoted.

On 24 February 2021, the KNVB eventually discontinued category A senior competitions in this season, including Derde Divisie, again without promotion or relegation.

== Saturday league ==
=== Teams ===
Location of teams in the Derde Divisie Saturday 2020-21

| Club | Location | Venue | Capacity |
|---|---|---|---|
| ACV | Assen | Catawiki Sportpark | 2,000 |
| Ajax (amateurs) | Amsterdam | Sportpark De Toekomst | 2,250 |
| Barendrecht | Barendrecht | Sportpark De Bongerd | 1,800 |
| DOVO | Veenendaal | Sportpark Panhuis | 3,200 |
| DVS '33 | Ermelo | Sportlaan | 5,500 |
| Excelsior '31 | Rijssen | Sportpark De Koerbelt | 3,150 |
| GOES | Goes | Sportpark Het Schenge | 1,500 |
| Harkemase Boys | Harkema | Sportpark De Bosk | 5,000 |
| Hoek | Hoek | Sportpark Denoek | 2,500 |
| Lisse | Lisse | Sportpark Ter Specke | 7,000 |
| ODIN '59 | Heemskerk | Sportpark Assumburg | 1,700 |
| Sportlust '46 | Woerden | Sportpark Cromwijck | 2,000 |
| Staphorst | Staphorst | Sportpark Het Noorderslag | 3,500 |
| Sparta Nijkerk | Nijkerk | Sportpark De Ebbenhorst | 5,000 |
| SteDoCo | Hoornaar | Sportpark SteDoCo | 1,700 |
| Ter Leede | Sassenheim | Sportpark De Roodemolen | 3,000 |
| VVOG | Harderwijk | Sportpark De Strokel | 10,000 |
| VVSB | Noordwijkerhout | Sportpark De Boekhorst | 2,500 |

>> Competition cancelled, what's listed below is the situation on 10 October 2020, the date the last matches were played.<<

=== Standings ===
| Pos | Team | Pld | W | D | L | GF | GA | GD | Pts | Promotion, qualification or relegation |
|---|---|---|---|---|---|---|---|---|---|---|
| 1 | SteDoCo | 6 | 4 | 1 | 1 | 13 | 5 | +8 | 13 | ~~Promotion to Tweede Divisie~~ |
| 2 | Lisse | 5 | 3 | 1 | 1 | 11 | 7 | +4 | 10 | ~~Qualification to promotion play-offs~~ |
| 3 | Sparta Nijkerk | 5 | 3 | 1 | 1 | 9 | 5 | +4 | 10 | ~~Qualification to promotion play-offs~~ |
| 4 | Excelsior '31 | 5 | 3 | 1 | 1 | 8 | 5 | +3 | 10 | ~~Qualification to promotion play-offs~~ |
| 5 | VVSB | 5 | 2 | 3 | 0 | 10 | 7 | +3 | 9 | |
| 6 | Sportlust '46 | 5 | 3 | 0 | 2 | 6 | 5 | +1 | 9 | |
| 7 | Barendrecht | 5 | 2 | 2 | 1 | 7 | 8 | −1 | 8 | |
| 8 | Hoek | 6 | 2 | 2 | 2 | 11 | 9 | +2 | 8 | |
| 9 | Harkemase Boys | 3 | 2 | 1 | 0 | 5 | 2 | +3 | 7 | |
| 10 | DOVO | 5 | 2 | 1 | 2 | 16 | 8 | +8 | 7 | |
| 11 | ODIN '59 | 4 | 2 | 0 | 2 | 6 | 6 | 0 | 6 | |
| 12 | Ajax (amateurs) | 5 | 2 | 0 | 3 | 11 | 21 | −10 | 6 | |
| 13 | Staphorst | 6 | 2 | 0 | 4 | 12 | 14 | −2 | 6 | |
| 14 | VVOG | 4 | 1 | 1 | 2 | 1 | 3 | −2 | 4 | |
| 15 | DVS '33 | 5 | 1 | 1 | 3 | 9 | 10 | −1 | 4 | ~~Qualification to relegation play-offs~~ |
| 16 | Ter Leede | 5 | 1 | 1 | 3 | 6 | 9 | −3 | 4 | ~~Qualification to relegation play-offs~~ |
| 17 | ACV | 4 | 0 | 2 | 2 | 1 | 8 | −7 | 2 | ~~Relegation to Hoofdklasse~~ |
| 18 | GOES | 5 | 0 | 0 | 5 | 2 | 12 | −10 | 0 | ~~Relegation to Hoofdklasse~~ |

Source: Soccerway
Rules for classification: Season in progress: 1) Most points won; 2) Less points lost; 3) Goal difference; 4) Goals scored; 5) Alphabetical order; End of season: 1) Points; 2) Goal difference; 3) Goals scored; 4) Head-to-head points; 5) Head-to-head goal difference; 6) Head-to-head away goals scored; 7) Play-off if relevant for deciding champion, relegation or participating in a European league, otherwise by draw. 8) Penalty shoot-out (only after a play-off)

=== Fixtures/results ===
| Home \ Away | ACV | AJA | BAR | DOV | DVS | EXC | GOE | HAR | HOE | LIS | ODI | SPA | SPO | STA | SDC | TER | VVO | VVS |
|---|---|---|---|---|---|---|---|---|---|---|---|---|---|---|---|---|---|---|
| ACV | | ~~21 Nov~~ | ~~27 Mar~~ | | ~~8 May~~ | ~~12 Dec~~ | ~~13 Mar~~ | ~~7 Nov~~ | 1–4 | ~~22 May~~ | ~~24 Oct~~ | ~~27 Feb~~ | ~~10 Apr~~ | ~~28 Nov~~ | 0–0 | ~~23 Jan~~ | ~~6 Feb~~ | ~~24 Apr~~ |
| Ajax (amateurs) | ~~15 May~~ | | ~~13 Mar~~ | ~~27 Feb~~ | ~~12 Dec~~ | ~~28 Nov~~ | ~~27 Mar~~ | ~~8 May~~ | ~~23 Jan~~ | ~~10 Apr~~ | ~~7 Nov~~ | ~~24 Oct~~ | ~~24 Apr~~ | ~~14 Nov~~ | ~~6 Feb~~ | 3–0 | | 2–3 |
| Barendrecht | ~~31 Oct~~ | ~~9 Jan~~ | | ~~23 Jan~~ | ~~20 Feb~~ | ~~14 Nov~~ | ~~30 Jan~~ | | ~~1 May~~ | ~~20 Mar~~ | ~~15 May~~ | 1–1 | ~~17 Oct~~ | ~~17 Apr~~ | ~~3 Apr~~ | ~~6 Mar~~ | ~~21 Nov~~ | ~~5 Dec~~ |
| DOVO | ~~3 Apr~~ | 11–0 | 1–1 | | ~~30 Jan~~ | ~~16 Jan~~ | ~~31 Oct~~ | ~~20 Feb~~ | ~~9 Jan~~ | ~~5 Dec~~ | ~~14 Nov~~ | ~~15 May~~ | ~~6 Mar~~ | 3–2 | ~~20 Mar~~ | ~~17 Oct~~ | ~~17 Apr~~ | ~~1 May~~ |
| DVS '33 | ~~5 Dec~~ | ~~20 Mar~~ | ~~24 Oct~~ | ~~7 Nov~~ | | 0–1 | ~~15 May~~ | ~~27 Feb~~ | ~~6 Mar~~ | ~~23 Jan~~ | ~~6 Feb~~ | ~~1 May~~ | ~~21 Nov~~ | ~~16 Jan~~ | ~~17 Apr~~ | ~~3 Apr~~ | | 2–2 |
| Excelsior '31 | ~~20 Mar~~ | ~~3 Apr~~ | ~~10 Apr~~ | ~~24 Apr~~ | ~~22 May~~ | | ~~8 May~~ | ~~5 Dec~~ | ~~7 Nov~~ | 1–1 | 0–2 | ~~23 Jan~~ | ~~9 Jan~~ | 3–1 | ~~6 Mar~~ | ~~21 Nov~~ | ~~24 Oct~~ | ~~20 Feb~~ |
| GOES | ~~9 Jan~~ | ~~5 Dec~~ | ~~7 Nov~~ | ~~6 Feb~~ | 1–5 | | | ~~22 May~~ | ~~24 Oct~~ | ~~20 Feb~~ | ~~23 Jan~~ | ~~17 Apr~~ | ~~20 Mar~~ | ~~3 Apr~~ | 0–2 | ~~1 May~~ | ~~6 Mar~~ | ~~21 Nov~~ |
| Harkemase Boys | ~~17 Apr~~ | ~~17 Oct~~ | ~~6 Feb~~ | 3–1 | ~~31 Oct~~ | ~~15 May~~ | ~~12 Dec~~ | | ~~20 Mar~~ | ~~9 Jan~~ | | | ~~3 Apr~~ | ~~23 Jan~~ | ~~28 Nov~~ | ~~14 Nov~~ | ~~1 May~~ | ~~6 Mar~~ |
| Hoek | ~~30 Jan~~ | 3–5 | ~~12 Dec~~ | ~~10 Apr~~ | ~~14 Nov~~ | ~~13 Mar~~ | ~~24 Apr~~ | ~~16 Jan~~ | | 1–2 | ~~27 Feb~~ | ~~28 Nov~~ | ~~8 May~~ | ~~17 Oct~~ | ~~15 May~~ | ~~31 Oct~~ | 0–0 | ~~27 Mar~~ |
| Lisse | | ~~31 Oct~~ | ~~28 Nov~~ | ~~13 Mar~~ | ~~17 Oct~~ | ~~6 Feb~~ | ~~14 Nov~~ | ~~27 Mar~~ | ~~17 Apr~~ | | ~~12 Dec~~ | 4–1 | ~~30 Jan~~ | ~~27 Feb~~ | ~~1 May~~ | ~~15 May~~ | ~~16 Jan~~ | 1–3 |
| ODIN '59 | ~~6 Mar~~ | ~~1 May~~ | 0–1 | ~~22 May~~ | 3–2 | ~~17 Apr~~ | ~~17 Oct~~ | ~~30 Jan~~ | ~~21 Nov~~ | ~~3 Apr~~ | | ~~16 Jan~~ | ~~20 Feb~~ | 1–3 | ~~31 Oct~~ | ~~9 Jan~~ | ~~5 Dec~~ | ~~20 Mar~~ |
| Sparta Nijkerk | 4–0 | ~~20 Feb~~ | ~~24 Apr~~ | ~~21 Nov~~ | ~~9 Jan~~ | ~~31 Oct~~ | 1–0 | ~~10 Apr~~ | ~~3 Apr~~ | ~~6 Mar~~ | ~~8 May~~ | | 2–0 | ~~22 May~~ | ~~17 Oct~~ | ~~5 Dec~~ | ~~20 Mar~~ | ~~30 Jan~~ |
| Sportlust '46 | ~~14 Nov~~ | ~~16 Jan~~ | ~~27 Feb~~ | 2–0 | ~~27 Mar~~ | ~~1 May~~ | ~~28 Nov~~ | ~~24 Oct~~ | 0–2 | ~~7 Nov~~ | | ~~6 Feb~~ | | ~~13 Mar~~ | ~~12 Dec~~ | ~~17 Apr~~ | ~~23 Jan~~ | ~~15 May~~ |
| Staphorst | ~~1 May~~ | ~~6 Mar~~ | 2–3 | ~~27 Mar~~ | ~~24 Apr~~ | ~~30 Jan~~ | 3–1 | ~~21 Nov~~ | ~~20 Feb~~ | 1–3 | ~~10 Apr~~ | ~~7 Nov~~ | ~~5 Dec~~ | | ~~9 Jan~~ | ~~20 Mar~~ | ~~15 May~~ | ~~24 Oct~~ |
| SteDoCo | ~~20 Feb~~ | 4–1 | ~~16 Jan~~ | ~~24 Oct~~ | 3–0 | 1–3 | ~~10 Apr~~ | ~~24 Apr~~ | ~~5 Dec~~ | ~~21 Nov~~ | ~~27 Mar~~ | ~~13 Mar~~ | ~~22 May~~ | ~~8 May~~ | | ~~30 Jan~~ | ~~27 Feb~~ | ~~7 Nov~~ |
| Ter Leede | 0–0 | ~~22 May~~ | 4–1 | ~~8 May~~ | ~~28 Nov~~ | ~~27 Feb~~ | ~~16 Jan~~ | ~~13 Mar~~ | ~~6 Feb~~ | ~~24 Oct~~ | ~~24 Apr~~ | ~~27 Mar~~ | 1–2 | ~~12 Dec~~ | 1–3 | | ~~7 Nov~~ | ~~10 Apr~~ |
| VVOG | ~~17 Oct~~ | ~~30 Jan~~ | ~~8 May~~ | ~~28 Nov~~ | ~~10 Apr~~ | ~~27 Mar~~ | 1–0 | 0–1 | ~~22 May~~ | ~~24 Apr~~ | ~~13 Mar~~ | ~~12 Dec~~ | 0–2 | ~~31 Oct~~ | ~~14 Nov~~ | ~~20 Feb~~ | | ~~9 Jan~~ |
| VVSB | ~~16 Jan~~ | ~~17 Apr~~ | ~~22 May~~ | ~~12 Dec~~ | ~~13 Mar~~ | ~~17 Oct~~ | ~~27 Feb~~ | 1–1 | 1–1 | ~~8 May~~ | ~~28 Nov~~ | ~~14 Nov~~ | ~~31 Oct~~ | ~~6 Feb~~ | ~~23 Jan~~ | | ~~3 Apr~~ | |

Source: Soccerway
Legend: Blue = home team win; Yellow = draw; Red = away team win.

== Sunday league ==
=== Teams ===
Location of teams in the Derde Divisie Sunday 2020-21

| Club | Location | Venue | Capacity |
|---|---|---|---|
| ADO '20 | Heemskerk | Sportpark De Vlotter | 4,500 |
| Blauw Geel '38 | Veghel | PWA Sportpark | 2,500 |
| DEM | Beverwijk | Sportpark Adrichem | 1,500 |
| VV Dongen | Dongen | Sportpark De Biezen | 1,800 |
| EVV | Echt | Sportpark In de Bandert | 2,000 |
| Gemert | Gemert | Sportpark Molenbroek | 4,000 |
| Groene Ster | Heerlerheide | Sportpark Pronsebroek | 2,500 |
| USV Hercules | Utrecht | Sportpark Voordorp | 1,800 |
| Hoogland | Hoogland | Sportpark Langenoord | 1,800 |
| Hollandia | Hoorn | Sportpark Julianapark | 4,000 |
| HSC '21 | Haaksbergen | Groot Scholtenhagen | 4,500 |
| JOS Watergraafsmeer | Amsterdam | Sportpark Drieburg | 1,000 |
| OFC | Oostzaan | Sportpark OFC | 1,500 |
| OSS '20 | Oss | Sportpark De Rusheuvel | 1,800 |
| Quick (H) | Den Haag | Sportpark Nieuw Hanenburg | 1,500 |
| VV UNA | Veldhoven | Sportpark Zeelst | 2,000 |
| Unitas | Gorinchem | Sportpark Molenvliet | 3,000 |
| RKVV Westlandia | Naaldwijk | Sportpark De Hoge Bomen | 2,000 |

>> Competition cancelled, what's listed below is the situation on 11 October 2020, the date the last matches were played.<<

=== Standings ===
| Pos | Team | Pld | W | D | L | GF | GA | GD | Pts | Promotion, qualification or relegation |
|---|---|---|---|---|---|---|---|---|---|---|
| 1 | USV Hercules | 5 | 4 | 1 | 0 | 12 | 2 | +10 | 13 | ~~Promotion to Tweede Divisie~~ |
| 2 | Blauw Geel '38 | 6 | 4 | 1 | 1 | 17 | 8 | +9 | 13 | ~~Qualification to promotion play-offs~~ |
| 3 | OFC | 5 | 3 | 1 | 1 | 10 | 7 | +3 | 10 | ~~Qualification to promotion play-offs~~ |
| 4 | Groene Ster | 5 | 3 | 1 | 1 | 9 | 6 | +3 | 10 | ~~Qualification to promotion play-offs~~ |
| 5 | OSS '20 | 6 | 3 | 1 | 2 | 10 | 11 | −1 | 10 | |
| 6 | UNA | 6 | 2 | 2 | 2 | 15 | 9 | +6 | 8 | |
| 7 | Unitas | 6 | 2 | 2 | 2 | 13 | 8 | +5 | 8 | |
| 8 | Hollandia | 5 | 2 | 1 | 2 | 6 | 7 | −1 | 7 | |
| 9 | Westlandia | 6 | 2 | 1 | 3 | 10 | 11 | −1 | 7 | |
| 10 | Gemert | 6 | 2 | 1 | 3 | 6 | 10 | −4 | 7 | |
| 11 | JOS Watergraafsmeer | 6 | 2 | 1 | 3 | 4 | 9 | −5 | 7 | |
| 12 | Quick (H) | 5 | 1 | 3 | 1 | 9 | 7 | +2 | 6 | |
| 13 | EVV | 5 | 1 | 3 | 1 | 2 | 6 | −4 | 6 | |
| 14 | ADO '20 | 6 | 1 | 3 | 2 | 9 | 8 | +1 | 6 | |
| 15 | Dongen | 6 | 2 | 0 | 4 | 5 | 9 | −4 | 6 | ~~Qualification to relegation play-offs~~ |
| 16 | Hoogland | 5 | 1 | 2 | 2 | 8 | 11 | −3 | 5 | ~~Qualification to relegation play-offs~~ |
| 17 | DEM | 5 | 1 | 2 | 2 | 6 | 13 | −7 | 5 | ~~Relegation to Hoofdklasse~~ |
| 18 | HSC '21 | 6 | 0 | 2 | 4 | 5 | 14 | −9 | 2 | ~~Relegation to Hoofdklasse~~ |

Source: Soccerway
Rules for classification: Season in progress: 1) Most points won; 2) Less points lost; 3) Goal difference; 4) Goals scored; 5) Alphabetical order; End of season: 1) Points; 2) Goal difference; 3) Goals scored; 4) Head-to-head points; 5) Head-to-head goal difference; 6) Head-to-head away goals scored; 7) Play-off if relevant for deciding champion, relegation or participating in a European league, otherwise by draw. 8) Penalty shoot-out (only after a play-off)

=== Fixtures/results ===
| Home \ Away | ADO | BLA | DEM | DON | EVV | GEM | GRO | HER | HOL | HGL | HSC | JOS | OFC | OSS | QHA | UNA | UNI | WES |
|---|---|---|---|---|---|---|---|---|---|---|---|---|---|---|---|---|---|---|
| ADO '20 | | 2–3 | ~~2 May~~ | ~~3 Apr~~ | 0–0 | ~~7 Mar~~ | ~~10 Jan~~ | ~~17 Jan~~ | ~~31 Jan~~ | ~~18 Oct~~ | ~~18 Apr~~ | ~~21 Feb~~ | ~~21 Mar~~ | 4–0 | ~~1 Nov~~ | ~~6 Dec~~ | ~~24 May~~ | ~~22 Nov~~ |
| Blauw Geel '38 | ~~11 Apr~~ | | ~~7 Mar~~ | 4–0 | 0–0 | ~~2 May~~ | ~~21 Mar~~ | ~~8 Nov~~ | ~~22 Nov~~ | 5–1 | ~~31 Jan~~ | ~~6 Dec~~ | ~~25 Oct~~ | ~~25 Apr~~ | ~~10 Jan~~ | ~~16 May~~ | ~~28 Mar~~ | ~~21 Feb~~ |
| DEM | ~~8 Nov~~ | ~~15 Nov~~ | | ~~11 Apr~~ | ~~14 Mar~~ | ~~16 May~~ | 3–1 | ~~25 Oct~~ | ~~9 May~~ | ~~28 Mar~~ | ~~29 Nov~~ | ~~25 Apr~~ | | ~~13 Dec~~ | ~~7 Feb~~ | 1–6 | ~~28 Feb~~ | ~~24 Jan~~ |
| Dongen | ~~13 Dec~~ | ~~28 Feb~~ | ~~1 Nov~~ | | ~~29 Nov~~ | 0–1 | ~~16 May~~ | 0–1 | ~~28 Mar~~ | ~~15 Nov~~ | ~~7 Feb~~ | ~~31 Jan~~ | 0–1 | ~~18 Oct~~ | ~~2 May~~ | ~~17 Jan~~ | ~~14 Mar~~ | ~~18 Apr~~ |
| EVV | ~~16 May~~ | ~~18 Apr~~ | ~~10 Jan~~ | ~~21 Mar~~ | | ~~1 Nov~~ | ~~7 Mar~~ | 0–5 | 1–0 | ~~31 Jan~~ | ~~15 Nov~~ | ~~18 Oct~~ | ~~6 Dec~~ | ~~21 Feb~~ | ~~3 Apr~~ | ~~22 Nov~~ | ~~24 Jan~~ | ~~2 May~~ |
| Gemert | ~~25 Oct~~ | ~~29 Nov~~ | ~~22 Nov~~ | ~~24 May~~ | ~~28 Mar~~ | | ~~24 Jan~~ | ~~28 Feb~~ | ~~8 Nov~~ | ~~14 Mar~~ | ~~13 Dec~~ | ~~11 Apr~~ | ~~25 Apr~~ | ~~9 May~~ | 1–1 | ~~7 Feb~~ | 3–2 | 1–2 |
| Groene Ster | ~~25 Apr~~ | ~~13 Dec~~ | ~~24 May~~ | ~~25 Oct~~ | | 3–0 | | ~~28 Mar~~ | ~~14 Mar~~ | ~~17 Jan~~ | ~~28 Feb~~ | 1–0 | ~~11 Apr~~ | ~~29 Nov~~ | 1–1 | ~~8 Nov~~ | ~~9 May~~ | ~~7 Feb~~ |
| USV Hercules | ~~9 May~~ | ~~24 May~~ | ~~21 Feb~~ | ~~7 Mar~~ | ~~25 Apr~~ | 2–0 | ~~6 Dec~~ | | ~~11 Apr~~ | 2–2 | ~~1 Nov~~ | 2–0 | ~~31 Jan~~ | ~~10 Jan~~ | ~~18 Oct~~ | ~~21 Mar~~ | ~~22 Nov~~ | ~~3 Apr~~ |
| Hollandia | 3–1 | ~~24 Jan~~ | ~~18 Oct~~ | ~~10 Jan~~ | ~~7 Feb~~ | ~~18 Apr~~ | ~~15 Nov~~ | | | ~~13 Dec~~ | ~~16 May~~ | ~~3 Apr~~ | ~~7 Mar~~ | ~~1 Nov~~ | ~~29 Nov~~ | ~~2 May~~ | 2–1 | ~~21 Mar~~ |
| Hoogland | ~~24 Jan~~ | ~~3 Apr~~ | ~~6 Dec~~ | ~~21 Feb~~ | ~~8 Nov~~ | ~~10 Jan~~ | ~~2 May~~ | ~~18 Apr~~ | ~~24 May~~ | | 3–1 | ~~21 Mar~~ | ~~22 Nov~~ | 0–1 | | ~~7 Mar~~ | ~~7 Feb~~ | ~~25 Oct~~ |
| HSC '21 | 1–1 | 1–4 | ~~3 Apr~~ | 0–2 | ~~11 Apr~~ | ~~21 Mar~~ | ~~22 Nov~~ | ~~24 Jan~~ | ~~6 Dec~~ | ~~9 May~~ | | ~~10 Jan~~ | ~~21 Feb~~ | ~~24 May~~ | ~~7 Mar~~ | ~~25 Oct~~ | ~~25 Apr~~ | ~~8 Nov~~ |
| JOS Watergraafsmeer | 1–1 | ~~14 Mar~~ | ~~17 Jan~~ | ~~8 Nov~~ | ~~28 Feb~~ | ~~15 Nov~~ | ~~18 Apr~~ | ~~7 Feb~~ | ~~25 Oct~~ | ~~29 Nov~~ | ~~2 May~~ | | ~~16 May~~ | ~~28 Mar~~ | ~~13 Dec~~ | ~~24 Jan~~ | 0–4 | 2–1 |
| OFC | ~~29 Nov~~ | ~~7 Feb~~ | ~~18 Apr~~ | ~~9 May~~ | ~~24 May~~ | ~~17 Jan~~ | 2–3 | ~~15 Nov~~ | 1–1 | ~~28 Feb~~ | ~~18 Oct~~ | ~~1 Nov~~ | | ~~14 Mar~~ | ~~24 Jan~~ | ~~3 Apr~~ | ~~13 Dec~~ | 3–2 |
| OSS '20 | ~~7 Feb~~ | ~~17 Jan~~ | ~~21 Mar~~ | ~~24 Jan~~ | ~~25 Oct~~ | ~~6 Dec~~ | ~~3 Apr~~ | ~~2 May~~ | ~~28 Feb~~ | ~~16 May~~ | 2–0 | ~~22 Nov~~ | 1–3 | | ~~18 Apr~~ | 3–3 | ~~8 Nov~~ | ~~7 Mar~~ |
| Quick (H) | ~~28 Mar~~ | ~~9 May~~ | 4–0 | ~~22 Nov~~ | ~~17 Jan~~ | ~~21 Feb~~ | ~~31 Jan~~ | ~~14 Mar~~ | ~~25 Apr~~ | ~~11 Apr~~ | 2–2 | ~~24 May~~ | ~~8 Nov~~ | 1–3 | | ~~28 Feb~~ | ~~25 Oct~~ | ~~6 Dec~~ |
| UNA | ~~14 Mar~~ | ~~1 Nov~~ | ~~31 Jan~~ | ~~25 Apr~~ | ~~9 May~~ | ~~18 Oct~~ | ~~21 Feb~~ | ~~13 Dec~~ | 3–0 | 2–2 | ~~28 Mar~~ | 0–1 | ~~10 Jan~~ | ~~11 Apr~~ | ~~15 Nov~~ | | ~~29 Nov~~ | ~~24 May~~ |
| Unitas | ~~15 Nov~~ | 4–1 | 1–1 | ~~6 Dec~~ | 1–1 | ~~4 Apr~~ | ~~18 Oct~~ | ~~16 May~~ | ~~21 Feb~~ | ~~1 Nov~~ | ~~17 Jan~~ | ~~7 Mar~~ | ~~2 May~~ | ~~31 Jan~~ | ~~21 Mar~~ | ~~18 Apr~~ | | ~~10 Jan~~ |
| Westlandia | ~~28 Feb~~ | ~~18 Oct~~ | 1–1 | 2–3 | ~~13 Dec~~ | ~~31 Jan~~ | ~~1 Nov~~ | ~~29 Nov~~ | ~~17 Jan~~ | ~~25 Apr~~ | ~~14 Mar~~ | ~~9 May~~ | ~~28 Mar~~ | ~~15 Nov~~ | ~~16 May~~ | 2–1 | ~~11 Apr~~ | |

Source: Soccerway
Legend: Blue = home team win; Yellow = draw; Red = away team win.
