= 2019–20 Derde Divisie =

Derde Divisie
- Season: 2019–20
- Champions: No champions.
- Promoted: No team promoted.
- Relegated: ONS Sneek (demoted)

The 2019–20 Derde Divisie season was the fourth edition of the Dutch fourth tier, formerly called Topklasse, since the restructuring of the league system in the summer of 2016.

== Effects of the 2020 coronavirus pandemic ==
On 12 March 2020, all football leagues were suspended until 31 March as the Dutch government forbade events due to the COVID-19 pandemic in the Netherlands. On 15 March this period was extended until 6 April. Due to the decision of the Dutch government to forbid all gatherings and events until 1 June 2020, this period was even further extended.

Eventually, on 31 March 2020, the KNVB decided not to resume competitions at amateur level. They also decided, for those competitions involved, there would be no final standings, and therefore no champions, no promotions and no relegations. All teams will start next season at the same level as they did this season.

Later on 12 June, the KNVB officially announced that the Derde Divisie would again consist of 36 teams from next season. This was one wish of CVTD, the interest group of football clubs from the Tweede and Derde Divisies. After the loss of the two reserve teams, the withdrawal of FC Lienden and the voluntary relegation of ONS Sneek, the two divisions of the third tier would have consisted of only 15 clubs each. To accommodate all group leaders in the Hoofdklasse, the KNVB decided to make each Derde Divisie group have 18 teams. The Hoofklasse group leaders, namely Sportlust '46, Staphorst, Unitas and Hollandia, therefore moved up to the Derde Divisie. The best runners-up of the Saturday and Sunday Hoofdklasse, ACV and JOS Watergraafsmeer, were also allowed to be promoted.

== Saturday league ==
=== Teams ===
Location of teams in the Derde Divisie Saturday 2019-20

Club	Location	Venue	Capacity
Ajax (amateurs)	Amsterdam	Sportpark De Toekomst	2,250
Barendrecht	Barendrecht	Sportpark De Bongerd	1,800
DOVO	Veenendaal	Sportpark Panhuis	3,200
DVS '33	Ermelo	Sportlaan	5,500
Excelsior '31	Rijssen	Sportpark De Koerbelt	3,150
GOES	Goes	Sportpark Het Schenge	1,500
Harkemase Boys	Harkema	Sportpark De Bosk	5,000
Hoek	Hoek	Sportpark Denoek	2,500
Jong Almere City	Almere	Yanmar Stadion	3,000
Lisse	Lisse	Sportpark Ter Specke	7,000
ODIN '59	Heemskerk	Sportpark Assumburg	1,700
ONS Sneek	Sneek	Zuidersportpark	3,150
Sparta Nijkerk	Nijkerk	Sportpark De Ebbenhorst	5,000
SteDoCo	Hoornaar	Sportpark SteDoCo	1,700
Ter Leede	Sassenheim	Sportpark De Roodemolen	3,000
VVOG	Harderwijk	Sportpark De Strokel	10,000
VVSB	Noordwijkerhout	Sportpark De Boekhorst	2,500

>> As the competition was cancelled, below is the situation on 7 March 2020, the date the last matches were played. <<

=== Standings ===
Pos	Team	Pld	W	D	L	GF	GA	GD	Pts	Promotion, qualification or relegation
1	Sparta Nijkerk (Note: Winner of the first period (games 1-16).)	22	17	1	4	58	27	+31	52	~~Promotion to Tweede Divisie~~
2	ODIN '59	22	15	2	5	63	30	+33	47	~~Qualification to promotion play-offs~~
3	Harkemase Boys	22	13	3	6	43	34	+9	42	~~Qualification to promotion play-offs~~
4	DVS '33	23	13	3	7	39	30	+9	42	~~Qualification to promotion play-offs~~
5	Lisse	23	11	5	7	44	33	+11	38	
6	Hoek	23	10	4	9	54	42	+12	34	
7	Barendrecht	23	10	4	9	37	38	−1	34	
8	Ajax (amateurs)	22	9	4	9	31	38	−7	31	
9	Excelsior '31	23	9	4	10	50	40	+10	31	
10	Jong Almere City	23	9	4	10	54	48	+6	31	Entered under-21 competition
11	GOES	23	9	4	10	33	44	−11	31	
12	VVSB	22	8	4	10	47	48	−1	28	
13	SteDoCo	22	7	7	8	41	42	−1	28	
14	Ter Leede	23	7	6	10	36	53	−17	27	~~Qualification to relegation play-offs~~
15	DOVO	23	6	4	13	45	55	−10	22	~~Qualification to relegation play-offs~~
16	ONS Sneek (R)	23	2	6	15	32	72	−40	12	Voluntary relegation to Hoofdklasse
17	VVOG	22	2	5	15	26	59	−33	11	~~Relegation to Hoofdklasse~~

Source: Soccerway
Rules for classification: Season in progress: 1) Most points won; 2) Less points lost; 3) Goal difference; 4) Goals scored; 5) Alphabetical order; End of season: 1) Points; 2) Goal difference; 3) Goals scored; 4) Head-to-head points; 5) Head-to-head goal difference; 6) Head-to-head away goals scored; 7) Play-off if relevant for deciding champion, relegation or participating in a European league, otherwise by draw. 8) Penalty shoot-out (only after a play-off)
(R) Relegated

=== Fixtures and results ===
Home \ Away	AJA	BAR	DOV	DVS	EXC	GOE	HAR	HOE	JAL	LIS	ODI	ONS	SPA	SDC	TER	VVO	VVS
Ajax (amateurs)		0–1	~~14 Mar~~	0–4	4–0	1–1	0–2	~~23 May~~	~~28 Mar~~	1–2	~~4 Apr~~	2–1	~~18 Apr~~	~~9 May~~	2–1	2–1	2–2
Barendrecht	1–1		2–2	~~4 Apr~~	~~23 May~~	0–1	~~2 May~~	0–4	2–2	0–2	0–2	~~21 Mar~~	2–1	0–3	4–1	~~11 Apr~~	3–1
DOVO	2–3	1–2		~~23 May~~	2–6	2–3	1–0	~~18 Apr~~	1–2	3–1	0–4	5–0	~~9 May~~	~~4 Apr~~	1–1	7–5	~~21 Mar~~
DVS '33	3–2	0–2	2–1		0–3	4–0	~~14 Mar~~	0–0	5–2	~~16 May~~	4–1	~~9 May~~	0–1	1–0	~~28 Mar~~	1–0	~~11 Apr~~
Excelsior '31	~~16 May~~	1–1	1–2	1–3		~~2 May~~	2–3	2–3	~~11 Apr~~	2–2	0–1	6–1	~~28 Mar~~	3–3	2–2	5–0	0–2
GOES	0–1	~~18 Apr~~	1–0	3–1	0–4		~~28 Mar~~	2–0	0–3	1–2	~~9 May~~	2–2	~~23 May~~	0–1	3–0	3–0	1–2
Harkemase Boys	0–0	1–2	4–3	2–2	~~18 Apr~~	2–3		6–0	3–2	0–3	0–6	3–2	~~4 Apr~~	~~21 Mar~~	~~9 May~~	2–0	~~16 May~~
Hoek	6–1	1–2	1–3	~~21 Mar~~	~~4 Apr~~	6–1	1–1		~~14 Mar~~	1–0	~~16 May~~	4–0	2–4	5–2	1–4	6–0	~~2 May~~
Jong Almere City	1–3	~~16 May~~	4–2	0–1	2–4	4–4	0–3	4–1		~~21 Mar~~	3–3	6–0	2–3	5–1	~~18 Apr~~	~~9 May~~	1–0
Lisse	~~11 Apr~~	1–0	3–1	6–0	~~9 May~~	~~14 Mar~~	0–1	1–1	3–3		~~18 Apr~~	4–1	1–0	4–2	0–2	~~28 Mar~~	2–4
ODIN '59	1–0	3–4	3–2	~~2 May~~	3–1	5–1	~~11 Apr~~	0–1	2–1	0–3		4–1	1–2	~~23 May~~	8–0	~~14 Mar~~	~~28 Mar~~
ONS Sneek	~~2 May~~	3–2	~~11 Apr~~	1–2	~~14 Mar~~	1–1	~~23 May~~	~~28 Mar~~	2–3	4–1	1–2		1–4	2–2	3–3	1–1	1–7
Sparta Nijkerk	4–2	3–2	4–1	1–0	2–0	3–0	3–0	2–5	~~2 May~~	4–1	~~21 Mar~~	4–1		3–3	~~11 Apr~~	~~16 May~~	3–1
SteDoCo	3–0	~~28 Mar~~	1–1	1–0	0–2	~~16 May~~	1–2	~~11 Apr~~	4–1	~~2 May~~	2–3	1–1	1–0		~~14 Mar~~	2–0	3–3
Ter Leede	0–1	0–3	~~16 May~~	1–2	1–3	~~21 Mar~~	0–2	3–2	1–0	1–1	2–2	~~4 Apr~~	0–4	3–3		4–3	2–0
VVOG	~~21 Mar~~	4–2	~~2 May~~	1–1	0–1	~~4 Apr~~	1–3	1–1	0–3	1–1	1–4	3–2	1–3	~~18 Apr~~	~~23 May~~		1–3
VVSB	2–3	~~9 May~~	2–2	1–3	3–1	0–2	2–3	3–2	~~23 May~~	~~4 Apr~~	1–5	~~18 Apr~~	~~14 Mar~~	3–2	3–4	2–2	

Source: Soccerway
Legend: Blue = home team win; Yellow = draw; Red = away team win.

== Sunday league ==
=== Teams ===
Location of teams in the Derde Divisie Sunday 2019-20

Club	Location	Venue	Capacity
ADO '20	Heemskerk	Sportpark De Vlotter	4,500
Blauw Geel '38	Veghel	PWA Sportpark	2,500
DEM	Beverwijk	Sportpark Adrichem	1,500
VV Dongen	Dongen	Sportpark De Biezen	1,800
EVV	Echt	Sportpark In de Bandert	2,000
Gemert	Gemert	Sportpark Molenbroek	4,000
Groene Ster	Heerlerheide	Sportpark Pronsebroek	2,500
USV Hercules	Utrecht	Sportpark Voordorp	1,800
Hoogland	Hoogland	Sportpark Langenoord	1,800
HSC '21	Haaksbergen	Groot Scholtenhagen	4,500
Jong ADO Den Haag	Den Haag	Cars Jeans Stadion	15,000
Lienden	Lienden	Sportpark De Abdijhof	2,400
OFC	Oostzaan	Sportpark OFC	1,500
OSS '20	Oss	Sportpark De Rusheuvel	1,800
Quick (H)	Den Haag	Sportpark Nieuw Hanenburg	1,500
VV UNA	Veldhoven	Sportpark Zeelst	2,000
RKVV Westlandia	Naaldwijk	Sportpark De Hoge Bomen	2,000

>> As the competition was cancelled, below is the situation on 8 March 2020, the date the last matches were played. <<

=== Standings ===
Pos	Team	Pld	W	D	L	GF	GA	GD	Pts	Promotion, qualification or relegation
1	OSS '20 (Note: Winner of the first period (games 1-16).)	22	16	5	1	55	24	+31	53	~~Promotion to Tweede Divisie~~
2	Jong ADO Den Haag	22	12	3	7	47	36	+11	39	Entered under-21 competition
3	OFC	22	11	3	8	38	27	+11	36	~~Qualification to promotion play-offs~~
4	Gemert	22	10	5	7	42	42	0	35	~~Qualification to promotion play-offs~~
5	Dongen	20	9	7	4	34	19	+15	34	
6	UNA	22	8	8	6	35	39	−4	32	
7	EVV	22	8	7	7	30	27	+3	31	
8	Blauw Geel '38	22	8	5	9	38	38	0	29	
9	HSC '21	22	8	5	9	34	39	−5	29	
10	USV Hercules	21	8	3	10	35	38	−3	27	
11	DEM	22	7	6	9	31	31	0	27	
12	Groene Ster	22	7	6	9	28	33	−5	27	
13	Quick (H)	21	7	5	9	29	26	+3	26	
14	Westlandia	22	6	6	10	31	40	−9	24	~~Qualification to relegation play-offs~~
15	ADO '20	21	5	6	10	29	35	−6	21	~~Qualification to relegation play-offs~~
16	Lienden	21	4	6	11	17	39	−22	18	Withdrawal from Derde Divisie
17	Hoogland	22	3	8	11	31	51	−20	17	~~Relegation to Hoofdklasse~~

Source: Soccerway
Rules for classification: Season in progress: 1) Most points won; 2) Less points lost; 3) Goal difference; 4) Goals scored; 5) Alphabetical order; End of season: 1) Points; 2) Goal difference; 3) Goals scored; 4) Head-to-head points; 5) Head-to-head goal difference; 6) Head-to-head away goals scored; 7) Play-off if relevant for deciding champion, relegation or participating in a European league, otherwise by draw. 8) Penalty shoot-out (only after a play-off)

=== Fixtures and results ===
Home \ Away	ADO	BLA	DEM	DON	EVV	GEM	GRO	HER	HGL	HSC	JAD	LIE	OFC	OSS	QHA	UNA	WES
ADO '20		2–2	2–0	~~26 Apr~~	~~3 May~~	2–2	2–0	0–3	~~10 Apr~~	~~22 Mar~~	~~29 Mar~~	1–2	2–1	1–1	~~17 May~~	1–2	1–3
Blauw Geel '38	~~13 Apr~~		~~11 Apr~~	1–1	2–1	~~14 Mar~~	1–1	1–0	3–5	3–2	1–2	~~29 Mar~~	~~17 May~~	0–1	0–0	3–0	~~10 May~~
DEM	2–2	1–4		1–0	1–1	1–2	0–2	0–2	~~24 May~~	4–1	~~14 Mar~~	~~13 Apr~~	~~5 Apr~~	1–3	3–3	0–0	~~18 Apr~~
Dongen	3–2	~~24 May~~	~~22 Mar~~		1–1	~~13 Apr~~	~~19 Apr~~	1–0	4–0	0–1	~~10 May~~	4–1	2–1	1–1	0–0	~~5 Apr~~	3–0
EVV	1–0	2–0	0–3	1–0		~~28 Mar~~	2–1	~~10 May~~	1–1	~~10 Apr~~	~~24 May~~	5–0	2–3	0–1	2–1	0–0	2–2
Gemert	~~19 Apr~~	1–1	~~17 May~~	3–2	2–0		3–1	2–1	1–1	4–1	~~5 Apr~~	~~10 May~~	3–0	2–4	3–2	~~21 Mar~~	2–0
Groene Ster	~~5 Apr~~	~~22 Mar~~	~~3 May~~	1–1	1–1	2–0		~~17 May~~	~~15 Mar~~	0–0	3–2	3–1	2–1	0–1	1–0	2–2	2–3
USV Hercules	4–2	~~3 May~~	~~29 Mar~~	0–1	1–3	~~11 Apr~~	1–3		2–2	2–1	2–1	3–0	1–2	~~15 Mar~~	1–5	~~24 May~~	3–2
Hoogland	1–2	1–8	1–2	1–1	0–2	3–3	2–1	~~13 Apr~~		~~5 Apr~~	2–2	~~19 Apr~~	~~22 Mar~~	~~10 May~~	1–1	3–3	1–0
HSC '21	1–0	~~18 Apr~~	3–3	~~29 Mar~~	2–1	3–0	~~10 May~~	3–4	2–0		2–1	1–1	0–4	0–3	4–1	~~13 Apr~~	~~17 May~~
Jong ADO Den Haag	2–0	5–1	0–3	2–2	3–0	4–2	3–1	~~22 Mar~~	~~3 May~~	2–2		~~11 Apr~~	1–2	~~17 May~~	2–1	4–1	3–1
Lienden	1–1	1–2	0–0	~~17 May~~	~~22 Mar~~	1–3	0–0	1–1	2–1	~~3 May~~	1–3		0–3	1–4	1–0	1–2	~~5 Apr~~
OFC	~~10 May~~	3–0	2–1	1–2	~~15 Mar~~	0–0	4–0	~~19 Apr~~	2–1	~~24 May~~	0–1	0–1		~~29 Mar~~	~~11 Apr~~	2–1	3–1
OSS '20	1–1	3–2	0–2	~~3 May~~	~~5 Apr~~	4–2	3–1	4–2	2–1	3–2	5–0	~~24 May~~	2–2		~~22 Mar~~	~~19 Apr~~	5–0
Quick (H)	2–0	0–2	1–0	~~15 Mar~~	~~13 Apr~~	4–1	~~24 May~~	~~5 Apr~~	~~29 Mar~~	2–0	~~19 Apr~~	1–0	1–1	1–2		~~10 May~~	3–1
UNA	1–5	4–1	2–1	1–5	~~17 May~~	5–1	~~11 Apr~~	2–2	2–1	0–2	3–2	~~15 Mar~~	~~3 May~~	2–2	1–0		0–0
Westlandia	~~15 Mar~~	2–0	0–2	~~11 Apr~~	2–2	~~24 May~~	~~29 Mar~~	2–0	5–2	1–1	1–2	1–1	3–1	~~26 Apr~~	~~3 May~~	1–1	

Source: Soccerway
Legend: Blue = home team win; Yellow = draw; Red = away team win.
