= 2021–22 Derde Divisie =

Derde Divisie
- Season: 2021–22
- Champions: Saturday: FC Lisse; Sunday: OFC Oostzaan
- Promoted: FC Lisse; OFC Oostzaan
- Relegated: Saturday: ODIN '59; Ajax (amateurs); VV Goes; Sunday: Hoogland; EVV; HVV Hollandia; RKVV Westlandia

The 2021–22 Derde Divisie season was the sixth edition of the Dutch fourth tier, formerly called Topklasse, since the restructuring of the league system in the summer of 2016.

== Saturday league ==
=== Teams ===
Location of teams in the Derde Divisie Saturday 2021–22

Club	Location	Venue	Capacity
ACV	Assen	Catawiki Sportpark	2,000
Ajax (amateurs)	Amsterdam	Sportpark De Toekomst	2,250
Barendrecht	Barendrecht	Sportpark De Bongerd	1,800
DOVO	Veenendaal	Sportpark Panhuis	3,200
DVS '33	Ermelo	Sportlaan	5,500
Excelsior '31	Rijssen	Sportpark De Koerbelt	3,150
GOES	Goes	Sportpark Het Schenge	1,500
Harkemase Boys	Harkema	Sportpark De Bosk	5,000
Hoek	Hoek	Sportpark Denoek	2,500
Lisse	Lisse	Sportpark Ter Specke	7,000
ODIN '59	Heemskerk	Sportpark Assumburg	1,700
Sportlust '46	Woerden	Sportpark Cromwijck	2,000
Staphorst	Staphorst	Sportpark Het Noorderslag	3,500
Sparta Nijkerk	Nijkerk	Sportpark De Ebbenhorst	5,000
SteDoCo	Hoornaar	Sportpark SteDoCo	1,700
Ter Leede	Sassenheim	Sportpark De Roodemolen	3,000
VVOG	Harderwijk	Sportpark De Strokel	10,000
VVSB	Noordwijkerhout	Sportpark De Boekhorst	2,500

=== Number of teams by province ===
Number of teams	Province	Team(s)
5	South Holland	Barendrecht, Lisse, SteDoCo, Ter Leede, VVSB
3	Gelderland	DVS '33, Sparta Nijkerk, VVOG
2	North Holland	Ajax (amateurs), ODIN '59
2	Overijssel	Excelsior '31, Staphorst
2	Utrecht	DOVO, Sportlust '46
2	Zeeland	GOES, Hoek
1	Drenthe	ACV
1	Friesland	Harkemase Boys

=== Standings ===
Pos	Team	Pld	W	D	L	GF	GA	GD	Pts	Promotion, qualification or relegation
1	Lisse (C, P)	34	21	7	6	70	38	+32	70	Promotion to Tweede Divisie
2	Sparta Nijkerk (Note: Winner of the Second Period (Rounds 13–23))	34	19	7	8	65	38	+27	64	Qualification to promotion play-offs
3	Sportlust '46 (Note: Winner of the First Period (Rounds 1–12))	34	17	7	10	63	40	+23	58	Qualification to promotion play-offs
4	DVS '33 (Note: Winner of the Third Period (Rounds 24–34))	34	18	4	12	61	41	+20	58	Qualification to promotion play-offs
5	Hoek	34	16	7	11	53	49	+4	55	
6	ACV	34	14	9	11	50	42	+8	51	
7	Excelsior '31	34	14	9	11	53	47	+6	51	
8	Barendrecht	34	13	11	10	72	57	+15	50	
9	SteDoCo	34	12	9	13	49	48	+1	45	
10	Staphorst	34	13	6	15	54	56	−2	45	
11	Ter Leede	34	13	5	16	49	67	−18	44	
12	Harkemase Boys	34	10	12	12	63	62	+1	42	
13	DOVO	34	10	8	16	43	57	−14	38	
14	VVSB	34	10	8	16	50	66	−16	38	
15	ODIN '59 (R)	34	9	10	15	52	68	−16	37	Qualification to relegation play-offs
16	VVOG (O)	34	10	7	17	61	82	−21	37	Qualification to relegation play-offs
17	Ajax (amateurs) (R)	34	10	6	18	38	54	−16	36	Relegation to Hoofdklasse
18	GOES (R)	34	6	10	18	44	78	−34	28	Relegation to Hoofdklasse

Source: Soccerway
Rules for classification: Season in progress: 1) Most points won; 2) Less points lost; 3) Goal difference; 4) Goals scored; 5) Alphabetical order; End of season: 1) Points; 2) Goal difference; 3) Goals scored; 4) Head-to-head points; 5) Head-to-head goal difference; 6) Head-to-head away goals scored; 7) Play-off if relevant for deciding champion, relegation or participating in a European league, otherwise by draw. 8) Penalty shoot-out (only after a play-off)
(C) Champions; (O) Play-off winners; (P) Promoted; (R) Relegated

=== Fixtures/results ===
Home \ Away	ACV	AJA	BAR	DOV	DVS	EXC	GOE	HAR	HOE	LIS	ODI	SPA	SPO	STA	SDC	TER	VVO	VVS
ACV		0–0	4–1	3–0	1–3	0–2	0–2	0–1	1–1	0–1	0–1	2–2	1–2	2–1	1–0	0–1	3–1	1–1
Ajax (amateurs)	0–2		0–3	3–2	0–1	0–1	3–0	1–1	3–0	3–0	1–0	0–1	2–1	0–3	3–1	4–1	3–6	3–1
Barendrecht	1–1	2–1		3–1	2–2	1–3	2–2	0–0	1–3	6–2	5–0	3–0	2–1	0–2	2–2	4–2	5–1	6–0
DOVO	1–2	1–0	2–0		0–0	0–2	3–0	3–3	1–3	0–0	2–1	0–0	3–1	2–1	0–4	3–1	1–2	3–3
DVS '33	1–0	1–0	4–1	3–0		2–1	5–1	1–0	4–0	1–2	1–2	2–1	0–1	1–1	3–1	1–1	5–0	0–2
Excelsior '31	3–0	2–0	0–0	1–0	3–1		3–3	3–2	0–0	1–3	2–2	0–4	4–1	2–0	0–0	3–1	2–1	1–2
GOES	2–2	0–0	3–2	2–0	1–2	1–3		3–3	0–1	1–4	1–0	1–3	0–0	0–1	0–2	0–0	2–2	0–3
Harkemase Boys	2–3	1–1	2–4	1–0	2–1	2–0	3–3		1–2	1–1	4–0	2–3	0–1	5–0	1–2	5–1	1–1	4–2
Hoek	1–1	1–0	1–1	2–3	2–0	2–1	2–0	2–2		2–1	0–2	0–0	0–4	3–1	1–4	0–1	4–0	2–0
Lisse	2–3	2–0	0–0	3–0	1–0	0–0	4–0	4–1	4–2		3–3	4–2	3–1	3–1	3–1	3–0	4–2	2–1
ODIN '59	1–2	3–2	2–2	4–1	1–4	5–1	4–3	3–3	0–2	0–0		1–1	2–2	4–1	1–2	1–1	2–2	2–2
Sparta Nijkerk	2–2	1–2	3–2	1–1	2–0	2–1	6–2	4–1	1–2	2–1	2–0		0–1	1–0	1–2	3–0	3–2	2–0
Sportlust '46	0–0	9–0	2–2	0–2	2–3	2–2	3–0	4–1	2–1	0–2	3–1	0–2		4–2	2–1	2–1	4–0	1–0
Staphorst	1–3	1–0	4–1	2–1	1–3	2–2	4–0	2–2	1–0	1–3	5–1	2–0	0–0		2–0	6–3	4–3	0–0
SteDoCo	2–1	1–1	2–2	2–0	3–1	0–0	0–3	1–1	3–3	0–1	2–0	0–1	0–0	3–0		3–1	1–4	2–2
Ter Leede	1–2	2–1	3–2	1–1	3–1	2–1	3–2	0–1	2–3	1–0	2–0	1–5	0–5	0–0	3–1		1–2	2–1
VVOG	2–4	1–1	2–3	3–3	0–2	2–1	3–4	2–3	3–2	0–2	3–1	1–1	0–2	2–1	2–1	1–2		4–3
VVSB	0–3	2–0	0–1	0–3	3–2	4–2	2–2	4–1	1–3	2–2	1–2	0–3	3–0	2–1	2–0	0–5	1–1	

Source: Soccerway
Legend: Blue = home team win; Yellow = draw; Red = away team win.

== Sunday league ==
=== Teams ===
Location of teams in the Derde Divisie Sunday 2021–22

Club	Location	Venue	Capacity
ADO '20	Heemskerk	Sportpark De Vlotter	4,500
Blauw Geel '38	Veghel	PWA Sportpark	2,500
DEM	Beverwijk	Sportpark Adrichem	1,500
VV Dongen	Dongen	Sportpark De Biezen	1,800
EVV	Echt	Sportpark In de Bandert	2,000
Gemert	Gemert	Sportpark Molenbroek	4,000
Groene Ster	Heerlerheide	Sportpark Pronsebroek	2,500
USV Hercules	Utrecht	Sportpark Voordorp	1,800
Hoogland	Hoogland	Sportpark Langenoord	1,800
Hollandia	Hoorn	Sportpark Julianapark	4,000
HSC '21	Haaksbergen	Groot Scholtenhagen	4,500
JOS Watergraafsmeer	Amsterdam	Sportpark Drieburg	1,000
OFC	Oostzaan	Sportpark OFC	1,500
OSS '20	Oss	Sportpark De Rusheuvel	1,800
Quick (H)	Den Haag	Sportpark Nieuw Hanenburg	1,500
VV UNA	Veldhoven	Sportpark Zeelst	2,000
Unitas	Gorinchem	Sportpark Molenvliet	3,000
RKVV Westlandia	Naaldwijk	Sportpark De Hoge Bomen	2,000

=== Number of teams by province ===
Number of teams	Province	Team(s)
5	North Brabant	Blauw Geel '38, Dongen, Gemert, OSS '20, UNA
5	North Holland	ADO '20, DEM, Hollandia, JOS Watergraafsmeer, OFC
3	South Holland	Quick (H), Unitas, Westlandia
2	Limburg	EVV, Groene Ster
2	Utrecht	USV Hercules, Hoogland
1	Overijssel	HSC '21

=== Standings ===
Pos	Team	Pld	W	D	L	GF	GA	GD	Pts	Promotion, qualification or relegation
1	OFC (Note: Winner of the First Period (Rounds 1–12)) (C, P)	34	18	7	9	66	47	+19	61	Promotion to Tweede Divisie
2	USV Hercules	34	18	5	11	74	46	+28	59	Qualification to promotion play-offs
3	ADO '20	34	17	7	10	64	46	+18	58	
4	Gemert (Note: Winner of the Second Period (Rounds 13–23))	34	15	12	7	75	57	+18	57	Qualification to promotion play-offs
5	OSS '20	34	16	8	10	62	46	+16	55 (Note: OSS '20 were deducted one point by the Royal Dutch Football Association.)	
6	Groene Ster	34	14	9	11	48	50	−2	51	
7	Dongen	34	13	11	10	56	47	+9	50	
8	UNA	34	15	5	14	60	58	+2	50	
9	HSC '21 (Note: Winner of the Third Period (Rounds 24–34))	34	15	4	15	63	52	+11	49	Qualification to promotion play-offs
10	Quick (H)	34	14	5	15	47	44	+3	47	
11	Blauw Geel '38	34	13	6	15	55	56	−1	45	
12	DEM	34	13	6	15	37	50	−13	45	
13	Unitas	34	12	6	16	41	59	−18	42	
14	JOS Watergraafsmeer	34	12	6	16	59	69	−10	40 (Note: JOS Watergraafsmeer were deducted a total of two points by the Royal Dutch Football Association for failing to report the financial statements over the period 2019–2020 in time.)	
15	Hoogland (R)	34	11	6	17	42	64	−22	39	Qualification to relegation play-offs
16	EVV (R)	34	9	10	15	36	59	−23	37	Qualification to relegation play-offs
17	Hollandia (R)	34	10	5	19	38	55	−17	35	Relegation to Hoofdklasse
18	Westlandia (R)	34	8	8	18	43	61	−18	32	Relegation to Hoofdklasse

Source: Soccerway
Rules for classification: Season in progress: 1) Most points won; 2) Less points lost; 3) Goal difference; 4) Goals scored; 5) Alphabetical order; End of season: 1) Points; 2) Goal difference; 3) Goals scored; 4) Head-to-head points; 5) Head-to-head goal difference; 6) Head-to-head away goals scored; 7) Play-off if relevant for deciding champion, relegation or participating in a European league, otherwise by draw. 8) Penalty shoot-out (only after a play-off)
(C) Champions; (P) Promoted; (R) Relegated

=== Fixtures/results ===
Home \ Away	ADO	BLA	DEM	DON	EVV	GEM	GRO	HER	HOL	HGL	HSC	JOS	OFC	OSS	QHA	UNA	UNI	WES
ADO '20		2–1	2–0	2–2	2–2	2–5	2–3	4–2	1–0	3–0	4–1	4–2	1–2	1–1	0–1	3–0	4–1	3–0
Blauw Geel '38	0–2		2–1	0–2	0–1	2–5	1–1	0–1	4–0	5–1	2–0	3–1	2–3	0–2	0–1	3–2	2–1	4–0
DEM	3–2	1–4		2–1	2–2	1–2	1–0	1–0	0–2	0–0	0–3	0–1	3–0	0–0	2–2	2–1	1–2	3–2
Dongen	2–1	2–1	3–0		0–2	3–3	2–1	2–2	1–0	2–0	1–1	1–1	1–1	1–2	5–3	0–1	2–0	0–0
EVV	1–1	2–4	1–1	1–1		2–2	0–0	2–3	1–0	2–1	1–4	0–4	0–2	1–3	1–0	0–1	1–2	2–0
Gemert	2–2	0–0	3–3	2–1	3–4		1–2	2–2	3–0	2–3	3–1	4–3	1–1	2–1	4–2	1–2	3–1	1–0
Groene Ster	1–0	1–1	3–0	2–2	3–2	3–3		2–1	3–1	3–1	0–3	1–0	3–1	3–4	1–0	2–1	1–2	0–0
USV Hercules	3–3	7–1	0–1	1–3	3–0	1–2	3–1		2–0	1–2	1–0	3–0	2–3	3–1	1–3	4–1	0–1	6–3
Hollandia	0–1	1–1	0–2	0–2	0–0	2–1	3–0	1–3		0–1	0–4	0–1	1–1	3–1	2–0	0–2	1–1	2–0
Hoogland	1–2	2–1	0–1	0–1	0–0	2–2	1–0	1–2	0–4		0–1	3–1	4–1	2–2	3–0	2–2	2–1	0–4
HSC '21	3–1	4–2	1–0	4–3	0–1	3–2	0–1	0–3	2–2	4–1		1–5	1–1	4–0	3–3	7–2	4–0	2–1
JOS Watergraafsmeer	1–3	2–2	2–0	3–2	4–1	2–3	2–3	1–4	1–0	1–3	1–0		5–4	3–3	1–2	1–3	2–0	2–2
OFC	0–0	2–3	3–1	2–1	2–0	4–1	2–2	1–2	3–5	4–0	2–1	4–0		1–0	3–0	2–0	0–0	2–1
OSS '20	5–1	0–1	0–1	1–1	1–0	0–0	2–0	1–1	3–1	4–1	3–0	6–0	1–3		1–0	1–1	3–2	2–1
Quick (H)	0–1	3–2	3–0	3–1	5–0	1–3	0–0	0–1	4–0	0–2	1–0	1–0	0–2	0–2		3–1	3–0	2–0
UNA	0–2	0–1	3–0	1–1	1–2	0–0	4–1	1–5	3–4	1–1	3–1	1–4	1–0	3–1	2–1		3–2	6–0
Unitas	1–0	0–0	0–2	1–2	3–0	0–3	1–1	1–0	0–3	3–1	1–0	0–0	4–3	4–2	0–0	1–4		1–3
Westlandia	0–2	3–0	0–2	3–2	1–1	1–1	3–0	1–1	3–0	4–1	1–0	2–2	0–1	1–3	0–0	0–3	3–4	

Source: Soccerway
Legend: Blue = home team win; Yellow = draw; Red = away team win.

== Promotion/relegation play-offs ==
=== Derde Divisie promotion/relegation playoffs ===
Since Kozakken Boys and GVVV finished 16th and 17th respectively, they will have to play relegation playoffs against teams from the Derde Divisie for one spot in the 2022–23 Tweede Divisie.

==== Bracket ====
Quarterfinals
Kozakken Boys	0	4	4
Sportlust '46	0	1	1
USV Hercules	2	1	3
DVS '33	5	1	6
GVVV	2	2	4
VV Gemert	1	0	1
Sparta Nijkerk	0	1	1
HSC '21	1	2	3

Semifinals
Kozakken Boys	1	2	3
DVS '33	1	1	2
GVVV	3	3	6
HSC '21	1	1	2

Final
Kozakken Boys	3	4	7
GVVV	1	1	2

==== Quarterfinals ====
===== First legs =====
8 June 2022	Sportlust '46	0–0	Kozakken Boys	Woerden
20:00		Report		Stadium: Sportpark Cromwijck

9 June 2022	DVS '33	5–2	USV Hercules	Ermelo
20:00	Nijland 1'; Evre 32'; Jonker 45'; Kruisheer 65'; Veenhof 70'	Report	38' Carmelia; 88' Pieters	Stadium: Sportpark Zuid; Attendance: 700

9 June 2022	HSC '21	1–0	Sparta Nijkerk	Haaksbergen
20:00	Uğuz 65'	Report		Stadium: Groot Scholtenhagen

9 June 2022	VV Gemert	1–2	GVVV	Gemert
20:00	Barten 90+2'	Report	22' Bitter; 33' Burgering	Stadium: Sportpark Molenbroek; Attendance: 645

===== Second legs =====
11 June 2022	Kozakken Boys	4–1 (4–1 agg.)	Sportlust '46	Werkendam
15:00	Marijnissen 48', 86'; Lommers 53', 73'	Report	44' Bendadi	Stadium: De Zwaaier; Attendance: 784

11 June 2022	USV Hercules	1–1 (3–6 agg.)	DVS '33	Utrecht
18:00	Andeloe 63'	Report	60' (pen.) Kruisheer	Stadium: Sportpark Voordorp; Attendance: 400

11 June 2022	Sparta Nijkerk	1–2 (1–3 agg.)	HSC '21	Nijkerk
18:00	De Ruiter 57'	Report	16' Uğuz; 26' Ottink	Stadium: De Ebbenhorst

11 June 2022	GVVV	2–0 (4–1 agg.)	VV Gemert	Veenendaal
18:00	De Jong 42'; Burgering 84' (pen.)	Report		Stadium: Sportpark Panhuis; Attendance: 1,000

==== Semifinals ====
===== First legs =====
15 June 2022	DVS '33	1–1	Kozakken Boys	Ermelo
20:00				Stadium: Sportpark Zuid; Attendance: 850

15 June 2022	HSC '21	1–3	GVVV	Haaksbergen
20:00				Stadium: Groot Scholtenhagen; Attendance: 1600

===== Second legs =====
18 June 2022	Kozakken Boys	2–1 (3–2 agg.)	DVS '33	Werkendam
18:00				Stadium: De Zwaaier

18 June 2022	GVVV	3–1 (6–2 agg.)	HSC '21	Veenendaal
18:00				Stadium: Sportpark Panhuis

==== Final ====
===== First leg =====
22 June 2022	Kozakken Boys	3–1	GVVV	Werkendam
20:00				Stadium: De Zwaaier

===== Second leg =====
25 June 2022	GVVV	1–4 (2–7 agg.)	Kozakken Boys	Veenendaal
15:00				Stadium: Sportpark Panhuis

=== Hoofdklasse saturday promotion/relegation playoffs ===
Since ODIN '59 and VVOG finished 16th and 17th respectively, they will have to play relegation playoffs against teams from the Hoofdklasse Saturday for two spots in the 2022–23 Derde Divisie.

==== Brackets ====
Semifinals
1	RKAV Volendam	3	3	6
4	Zwaluwen	1	1	2
3	ODIN '59	3	1	4
2	ARC	2	3	5

Final
RKAV Volendam	1	2	3
ARC	0	2	2

Semifinals
1	VVOG	2	3	5
4	Eemdijk	2	2	4
3	SC Feyenoord	0	3	3
2	Genemuiden	1	1	2

Final
VVOG	3	1	4
SC Feyenoord	1	0	1

==== Semifinals ====
===== First legs =====
7 June 2022	ARC	2–3	ODIN '59	Alphen aan den Rijn
20:00		Report		Stadium: Zegersloot

7 June 2022	Zwaluwen	1–3	RKAV Volendam	Vlaardingen
20:00		Report		Stadium: Zwaluwen

7 June 2022	Eemdijk	2–2	VVOG	Bunschoten-Spakenburg
20:00		Report		Stadium: De Vinken

7 June 2022	Genemuiden	1–0	SC Feyenoord	Genemuiden
20:00		Report		Stadium: Sportpark de Wetering

===== Second legs =====
11 June 2022	SC Feyenoord	3–1 (3–2 agg.)	Genemuiden	Rotterdam
13:00		Report		Stadium: Varkenoord

11 June 2022	ODIN '59	1–3 (4–5 agg.)	ARC	Heemskerk
14:30		Report		Stadium: Sportpark Assumburg

11 June 2022	RKAV Volendam	3–1 (6–2 agg.)	Zwaluwen	Volendam
14:30		Report

11 June 2022	VVOG	3–2 (5–4 agg.)	Eemdijk	Harderwijk
14:30	Hoeve 74'; Dijkhof 89'; Wollgarten 90+2'	Report	19' Heus; 49' Hollart	Stadium: De Strokel

==== Finals ====
===== First legs =====
14 June 2022	ARC	0–1	RKAV Volendam	Alphen aan den Rijn
20:00				Stadium: Zegersloot

14 June 2022	VVOG	3–1	SC Feyenoord	Harderwijk
20:00				Stadium: De Strokel

===== Second legs =====
18 June 2022	RKAV Volendam	2–2 (3–2 agg.)	ARC	Volendam
14:30				Stadium: Hein Koning Voetbalstadion

18 June 2022	SC Feyenoord	0–1 (1–4 agg.)	VVOG	Rotterdam
14:30				Stadium: Varkenoord

=== Hoofdklasse sunday promotion/relegation playoffs ===
Since Hoogland and EVV finished 16th and 17th respectively, they will have to play relegation playoffs against teams from the Hoofdklasse Sunday for two spots in the 2022–23 Derde Divisie.

==== Brackets ====
Semifinals
1	Hoogland	0	5	5
4	Hoogeveen	0	2	2
3	OJC Rosmalen	5	2	7
2	SJC	0	0	0

Final
Hoogland	2	2	4
OJC Rosmalen	1	4	5

Semifinals
1	HBS	1	2	3
4	Orion (a.e.t.)	1	3	4
3	EVV	0	1	1
2	UDI '19	2	2	4

Final
Orion	3	1	4 (3)
UDI '19 (p)	2	2	4 (4)

==== Semifinals ====
===== First legs =====
9 June 2022	Hoogeveen	0–0	Hoogland	Hoogeveen
20:00				Stadium: Sportpark Bentinckspark; Attendance: 300

9 June 2022	UDI '19	2–0	EVV	Uden
20:00				Stadium: Sportpark Parkzicht; Attendance: 250

9 June 2022	Orion	1–1	HBS	Nijmegen
20:00				Stadium: Sportpark Mariënbosch

9 June 2022	SJC	0–5	OJC Rosmalen	Noordwijk
20:00				Stadium: Gemeentelijk Sportpark SJC

===== Second legs =====
12 June 2022	HBS	2–3 (a.e.t.) (3–4 agg.)	Orion	The Hague
14:00	van Pelt 105' (pen.); Baggerman 112'		92' van de Wetering; 100' Perquin; 117' Jellema	Stadium: Sportpark Daal en Bergselaan

12 June 2022	Hoogland	5–2 (5–2 agg.)	Hoogeveen	Hoogland
14:00				Stadium: Sportpark Langenoord

12 June 2022	OJC Rosmalen	2–0 (7–0 agg.)	SJC	Rosmalen
14:00				Stadium: Sportpark De Groote Wielen

12 June 2022	EVV	1–2 (1–4 agg.)	UDI '19	Echt-Susteren
14:30				Stadium: Sportpark "In De Bandert"

==== Finals ====
===== First legs =====
16 June 2022	Hoogland	2–1	OJC Rosmalen	Hoogland
14:30				Stadium: Sportpark Langenoord

16 June 2022	Orion	3–2	UDI '19	Nijmegen
14:30				Stadium: Sportpark Mariënbosch

===== Second legs =====
19 June 2022	OJC Rosmalen	4–2 (5–4 agg.)	Hoogland	Rosmalen
14:30				Stadium: Sportpark De Groote Wielen

19 June 2022	UDI '19	2–1 (a.e.t.) (4–4 agg.) (4–3 p)	Orion	Uden
14:30				Stadium: Sportpark Parkzicht
