= 2021–22 Tweede Divisie =

Tweede Divisie
- Season: 2021–22
- Dates: 21 August 2021 – 4 June 2022
- Champions: Katwijk
- Relegated: GVVV; ASWH
- Matches: 304
- Goals: 938 (3.09 per match)
- Top goalscorer: Floris van der Linden (26 goals)
- Biggest home win: Katwijk 6–0 TEC (14 May 2022); GVVV 6–0 ASWH (14 May 2022)
- Biggest away win: Jong Sparta 0–6 IJsselmeervogels (26 February 2022)
- Highest scoring: Jong Volendam 2–6 Jong Sparta (28 August 2021); Kozakken Boys 3–5 Jong Volendam (30 April 2022)
- Longest winning run: 9 matches Katwijk
- Longest unbeaten run: 10 matches Katwijk
- Longest winless run: 18 matches ASWH
- Longest losing run: 12 matches ASWH
- All statistics correct as of 4 June 2022.

The 2021–22 Tweede Divisie, known as Jack's League for sponsorship reasons, season was the sixth edition of the Dutch third tier since ending its hiatus since the 1970-71 season and the 21st edition using the Tweede Divisie name.

At an extraordinary KNVB federation meeting on 2 October 2017, representatives of the amateur and professional football reached an agreement about the route to be taken to renew the football pyramid. Part of this agreement was that no promotion or relegation took place between the Eerste and Tweede Divisie for the 2017–18 season at first.

At another extraordinary KNVB meeting on 7 June 2018, an agreement was reached on the number of reserves teams allowed in each division after the 2019–20 season and the extension of the non-promotion or relegation clause to initially two more seasons. For the Tweede Divisie it was two teams.

The KNVB met again on 16 December 2019 and decided to further extend the clause to last until 2022–23 and to relegate reserve teams from the Tweede Divisie along with the other second teams in the new under-21 competition.

== Teams ==
Location of teams in the Tweede Divisie 2021-22
South Holland clubs in the Tweede Divisie 2020/21

Club	Location	Venue	Capacity
AFC	Amsterdam	Sportpark Goed Genoeg	3,000
ASWH	Hendrik-Ido-Ambacht	Sportpark Schildman	3,000
Excelsior Maassluis	Maassluis	Sportpark Dijkpolder	5,000
GVVV	Veenendaal	Sportpark Panhuis	3,950
HHC Hardenberg	Hardenberg	Sportpark De Boshoek	4,500
Koninklijke HFC	Haarlem	Sportpark Spanjaardslaan	1,500
IJsselmeervogels	Spakenburg	Sportpark De Westmaat	9,000
Jong Sparta	Rotterdam	Het Kasteel	11,000
Jong Volendam	Volendam	Kras Stadion	7,384
Katwijk	Katwijk	Sportpark De Krom	6,000
Kozakken Boys	Werkendam	Sportpark De Zwaaier	4,000
Noordwijk	Noordwijk	Sportpark Duinwetering	6,100
Quick Boys	Katwijk aan Zee	Sportpark Nieuw Zuid	8,100
Rijnsburgse Boys	Rijnsburg	Sportpark Middelmors	6,100
Scheveningen	Scheveningen	Sportpark Houtrust	3,500
SV Spakenburg	Spakenburg	Sportpark De Westmaat	8,500
TEC	Tiel	Sportpark De Lok	2,500
De Treffers	Groesbeek	Sportpark Zuid	4,000

=== Number of teams by province ===
Number of teams	Province	Team(s)
8	South Holland	ASWH, Excelsior Maassluis, Jong Sparta, Katwijk, Noordwijk, Quick Boys, Rijnsburgse Boys, Scheveningen
3	North Holland	AFC, Koninklijke HFC, Jong Volendam
3	Utrecht	GVVV, IJsselmeervogels, SV Spakenburg
2	Gelderland	TEC, De Treffers
1	North Brabant	Kozakken Boys
1	Overijssel	HHC Hardenberg

== Standings ==
=== Regular competition ===
Pos	Team	Pld	W	D	L	GF	GA	GD	Pts	Promotion, qualification or relegation
1	Katwijk (C)	34	22	5	7	73	34	+39	71	
2	HHC Hardenberg	34	19	5	10	58	43	+15	62	
3	Koninklijke HFC	34	16	9	9	54	39	+15	57	
4	Rijnsburgse Boys	34	17	4	13	63	43	+20	55	
5	Jong Sparta	34	16	7	11	57	49	+8	55	
6	AFC	34	15	9	10	61	49	+12	54	
7	Noordwijk	34	16	6	12	53	46	+7	54	
8	Scheveningen	34	13	11	10	43	44	−1	50	
9	SV Spakenburg	34	14	7	13	64	62	+2	49	
10	Excelsior Maassluis	34	14	5	15	50	55	−5	47	
11	Jong Volendam (O)	34	14	3	17	66	65	+1	45	Qualification to U21 relegation play-offs
12	Quick Boys	34	12	8	14	43	53	−10	44	
13	IJsselmeervogels	34	13	3	18	44	48	−4	42	
14	TEC	34	11	9	14	44	63	−19	42	
15	De Treffers	34	12	5	17	38	51	−13	41	
16	Kozakken Boys (O)	34	8	11	15	46	62	−16	35	Qualification to relegation play-offs
17	GVVV (R)	34	9	7	18	45	54	−9	34	Qualification to relegation play-offs
18	ASWH (R)	34	5	6	23	38	80	−42	21	Relegation to Derde Divisie

Source: Flashscore
Rules for classification: Season in progress: 1) Most points won; 2) Less points lost; 3) Goal difference; 4) Goals scored; 5) Alphabetical order; End of season: 1) Points; 2) Goal difference; 3) Goals scored; 4) Head-to-head points; 5) Head-to-head goal difference; 6) Head-to-head away goals scored; 7) Play-off if relevant for deciding champion, relegation or participating in a European league, otherwise by draw. 8) Penalty shoot-out (only after a play-off)
(C) Champions; (O) Play-off winners; (R) Relegated

== Fixtures/results ==
Home \ Away	AFC	ASW	EXM	GVV	HFC	HHC	IJS	JSP	JVO	KAT	KOZ	NOO	QUI	RIJ	SCH	SPA	TEC	TRE
AFC		2–0	2–1	0–3	3–3	0–0	2–0	2–3	1–3	1–4	4–1	4–1	2–2	1–3	2–0	5–1	2–1	1–0
ASWH	3–3		2–1	3–1	2–2	1–1	0–2	0–4	0–3	1–3	1–1	1–5	1–1	1–3	2–3	3–1	0–1	0–5
Excelsior Maassluis	1–1	3–0		0–3	3–2	4–3	2–2	0–2	3–2	1–0	2–0	1–1	2–1	3–2	1–1	4–0	1–1	1–2
GVVV	1–0	6–0	0–2		1–1	0–2	2–1	0–3	2–5	1–3	2–2	1–1	1–1	0–3	0–2	4–0	5–1	2–0
Koninklijke HFC	1–0	3–2	3–0	0–0		0–1	4–1	2–1	3–1	4–1	1–1	2–1	2–1	0–1	1–1	2–3	0–0	1–0
HHC Hardenberg	3–2	3–1	1–0	3–0	3–1		0–2	3–0	3–1	1–0	2–3	2–1	3–1	2–1	0–1	3–3	1–1	2–1
IJsselmeervogels	0–3	3–2	0–2	3–0	1–0	0–2		2–0	2–1	0–2	4–0	1–2	0–1	2–1	1–2	2–2	3–0	1–0
Jong Sparta	1–4	1–2	3–0	2–1	1–1	2–1	2–1		2–1	0–0	3–1	1–2	3–1	3–1	1–1	0–6	4–1	1–1
Jong Volendam	2–0	2–0	3–1	2–1	1–1	3–4	0–1	2–6		0–3	3–0	2–2	1–2	1–0	0–2	2–5	4–0	3–0
Katwijk	2–0	3–2	2–0	2–0	0–1	2–0	2–0	5–0	3–2		2–0	2–0	4–1	1–3	3–1	2–2	6–0	3–0
Kozakken Boys	1–3	3–3	2–3	1–1	3–0	2–0	2–1	0–0	3–5	2–3		0–1	2–0	0–0	2–2	3–3	1–2	2–1
Noordwijk	1–1	2–0	1–2	2–1	0–1	0–2	3–2	2–0	4–1	2–0	2–1		4–1	2–0	1–0	2–3	0–3	1–0
Quick Boys	0–0	2–1	3–1	2–0	0–4	0–3	2–0	0–1	1–3	2–2	0–1	4–2		2–2	2–0	1–0	2–0	0–1
Rijnsburgse Boys	2–3	2–1	3–0	1–4	0–2	5–0	1–0	2–1	0–1	2–0	1–1	2–2	3–0		0–2	3–1	3–0	4–1
Scheveningen	1–2	0–3	0–3	2–1	0–2	2–1	2–1	1–1	3–2	2–2	2–1	0–0	0–0	0–2		2–1	1–2	3–0
SV Spakenburg	1–2	1–0	4–2	2–0	2–0	2–0	1–1	0–3	2–2	2–3	3–1	2–0	1–3	2–1	1–1		2–0	5–2
TEC	2–2	3–0	1–0	1–1	3–2	0–2	2–4	1–1	2–0	1–1	0–1	3–1	2–2	2–5	2–2	2–0		0–4
De Treffers	1–1	1–0	2–0	1–0	1–2	1–1	1–0	2–1	3–2	0–2	2–2	0–2	1–2	2–1	1–1	1–0	0–4	

Source: Flashscore
Legend: Blue = home team win; Yellow = draw; Red = away team win.

== Promotion/relegation play-offs ==
=== U21 play-offs ===
Since Jong Volendam finished as the lowest reserve team in the regular league season, they had to play a promotion-relegation play-offs tie against the champions of the Under-21 league, Almere City U21, for a spot in the 2022–23 Tweede Divisie.

8 June 2022	Almere City U21	1–0	Jong Volendam	Almere
20:00	Wildeboer 57'	Report		Stadium: Yanmar Stadion

11 June 2022	Jong Volendam	3–0 (3–1 agg.)	Almere City U21	Volendam
15:00	Blommestijn 7', 67'; Taha 45'	Report		Stadium: Kras Stadion

=== Derde Divisie promotion/relegation playoffs ===
Since Kozakken Boys and GVVV finished 16th and 17th respectively, they will have to play relegation playoffs against teams from the Derde Divisie for one spot in the 2022–23 Tweede Divisie. That means at least one team will be relegated from the Tweede Divisie through playoffs.

==== Bracket ====
Quarterfinals
Kozakken Boys	0	4	4
Sportlust '46	0	1	1
USV Hercules	2	1	3
DVS '33	5	1	6
GVVV	2	2	4
VV Gemert	1	0	1
Sparta Nijkerk	0	1	1
HSC '21	1	2	3

Semifinals
Kozakken Boys	1	2	3
DVS '33	1	1	2
GVVV	3	3	6
HSC '21	1	1	2

Final
Kozakken Boys	3	4	7
GVVV	1	1	2

==== Quarterfinals ====
===== First legs =====
8 June 2022	Sportlust '46	0–0	Kozakken Boys	Woerden
20:00		Report		Stadium: Sportpark Cromwijck

9 June 2022	DVS '33	5–2	USV Hercules	Ermelo
20:00	Nijland 1'; Evre 32'; Jonker 45'; Kruisheer 65'; Veenhof 70'	Report	38' Carmelia; 88' Pieters	Stadium: Sportpark Zuid; Attendance: 700

9 June 2022	HSC '21	1–0	Sparta Nijkerk	Haaksbergen
20:00	Uğuz 65'	Report		Stadium: Groot Scholtenhagen

9 June 2022	VV Gemert	1–2	GVVV	Gemert
20:00	Barten 90+2'	Report	22' Bitter; 33' Burgering	Stadium: Sportpark Molenbroek; Attendance: 645

===== Second legs =====
11 June 2022	Kozakken Boys	4–1 (4–1 agg.)	Sportlust '46	Werkendam
15:00	Marijnissen 48', 86'; Lommers 53', 73'	Report	44' Bendadi	Stadium: De Zwaaier; Attendance: 784

11 June 2022	USV Hercules	1–1 (3–6 agg.)	DVS '33	Utrecht
18:00	Andeloe 63'	Report	60' (pen.) Kruisheer	Stadium: Sportpark Voordorp; Attendance: 400

11 June 2022	Sparta Nijkerk	1–2 (1–3 agg.)	HSC '21	Nijkerk
18:00	De Ruiter 57'	Report	16' Uğuz; 26' Ottink	Stadium: De Ebbenhorst

11 June 2022	GVVV	2–0 (4–1 agg.)	VV Gemert	Veenendaal
18:00	De Jong 42'; Burgering 84' (pen.)	Report		Stadium: Sportpark Panhuis; Attendance: 1,000

==== Semifinals ====
===== First legs =====
15 June 2022	DVS '33	1–1	Kozakken Boys	Ermelo
20:00				Stadium: Sportpark Zuid; Attendance: 850

15 June 2022	HSC '21	1–3	GVVV	Haaksbergen
20:00				Stadium: Groot Scholtenhagen; Attendance: 1600

===== Second legs =====
18 June 2022	Kozakken Boys	2–1 (3–2 agg.)	DVS '33	Werkendam
18:00				Stadium: De Zwaaier

18 June 2022	GVVV	3–1 (6–2 agg.)	HSC '21	Veenendaal
18:00				Stadium: Sportpark Panhuis

==== Final ====
===== First leg =====
22 June 2022	Kozakken Boys	3–1	GVVV	Werkendam
20:00				Stadium: De Zwaaier

===== Second leg =====
25 June 2022	GVVV	1–4 (2–7 agg.)	Kozakken Boys	Veenendaal
15:00				Stadium: Sportpark Panhuis

== Top scorers ==
As of 4 June 2022

Rank	Player	Club	Goals
1	(Netherlands) Floris van der Linden	SV Spakenburg	26
2	(Netherlands) Koen Blommestijn	Jong Volendam	20
2	(Netherlands) Raily Ignacio	AFC	20
4	(Netherlands) Marouane Afaker	Jong Sparta	19
5	(Netherlands) Michael de Niet	Scheveningen	18
6	(Netherlands) Ahmed El Azzouti	Katwijk	17
7	(Netherlands) Jeroen Spruijt	Rijnsburgse Boys	16
8	(Netherlands) Sietse Brandsma	Koninklijke HFC	15
9	(Netherlands) Jesper Drost	HHC Hardenberg	14
9	(Netherlands) Killian van Mil	Katwijk	14
