= KNVB District Cup =

The KNVB District Cup (Dutch: Districtsbeker) is a cup competition for amateur football clubs in the Netherlands. The competition is held in each of the six districts of the Royal Dutch Football Association. The 24 semi-finalists qualify for next-seasons KNVB Cup. The winners of the six cup competitions used to contest for the KNVB Amateur Cup, but that cup was abolished in 2016.

== Competition format ==
Teams eligible for the competition are:

- All first teams of clubs playing in the fifth tier and lower in Dutch league football (Vierde Divisie and lower);
- The champions and period champions of all Reserve Hoofdklasse leagues.

The competition starts each year in late August with a group stage. The group stage consists of two paths: one with teams playing in the Eerste Klasse and Tweede Klasse, and one with the others. In the Eerste Klasse and Tweede Klasse path, teams who are playing in the same league cannot play each other. This may cause that teams from different districts are put in the same group. The group winners and runners-up qualify for the knockout stage.

In the path containing all other teams, teams from the same league can play each other. Regionalisation is applied as much as possible, also taking the level of teams into account. Only the group winners qualify from the next round.

In the first knock-out round, the paths are merged and teams from the Vierde Divisie enter. If a match ends in a draw, there will be no extra time played and the match goes to a penalty shoot-out. Extra time is played in the Final before a possible penalty shoot-out.

From the knockout stage, teams can get a bye if they are left over after the draw is made. If needed, an intermediate round will be played to narrow the number of teams down to 16 before the round of 16 is played.

== Qualification for the KNVB Cup ==
All the semi-finalists of all the district cups (24 in total) qualify for the KNVB Cup of the next season. If a team qualify for the Cup in multiple ways (promoting to the Derde Divisie and reaching the semi-finals of the District Cup), if a team is not eligible to enter the KNVB Cup (a reserve team), or does not enter because of any other reason, a lucky loser among the losing quarter-finalists is determined by:

Tie-breakers
1. All the match points of the teams, obtained from the knock-out stage (three for a win and one for a win after a penalty shoot-out). If a team does not play in a certain round, that round will be ignored for the other teams.
2. Goal difference.
3. Goals ahead.
4. Drawing of lots.

If a reserve team comes out as the lucky loser, the team will be ignored and the next team in the ranking will be eligible to enter.

In 2020, this scheme was used to determine the qualifiers for the 2020–21 KNVB Cup, since all the Dutch league and cup competitions were abandoned due to the COVID-19 pandemic in the Netherlands and none of the six district cups reached the semi-final stage yet.

== History ==
The cup competition, which started in the 1959–1960 season, initially saw a separation between Saturday clubs and Sunday clubs, who played in separate cup competitions. This separation was abolished in 1980; Saturday clubs and Sunday clubs from one district now play for the one cup of that district.

The reserve teams of professional football clubs played in the District Cup competitions until 1997 when the KNVB Reserve Cup was established.

In order to minimize the number of match days, between 2003 and 2006 the final eight teams in the district cups were divided into two groups. They played each other in group matches of 2 halves of 20 minutes, with all group matches played on the same day. The winners of the two groups qualified for the final.

== Recent winners ==
Year	North	East	West I	West II	South I	South II
2001–02	Joure	De Bataven	FC Hilversum	TONEGIDO	Geldrop	EVV
2002–03	Genemuiden	VVOG	IJsselmeervogels	TONEGIDO	UNA	VV Eijsden
2003–04	Sneek	Bennekom	Sporting Maroc	Ter Leede	DBS	Meerssen
2004–05	Genemuiden	HSC '21	Ajax Amateurs	Excelsior Maassluis	Triborgh	Gemert
2005–06	Harkemase Boys	WHC	GVVV	Rijnsburgse Boys	ASWH	EVV
2006–07	Harkemase Boys	Bennekom	Türkiyemspor	Lisse	UNA	Meerssen
2007–08	Hoogeveen	Achilles '29	Ajax Amateurs	Rijnsburgse Boys	Unitas	Gemert
2008–09	Harkemase Boys	Go Ahead Kampen	DOVO	Barendrecht	LRC Leerdam	RKSV Groene Ster
2009–10	SWZ	HSC '21	DOVO	Voorschoten '97	Dongen	SV Deurne
2010–11	Harkemase Boys	Achilles '29	ODIN '59	FC Lisse	UNA	JVC Cuijk
2011–12	SC Genemuiden	HHC Hardenberg	FC Chabab	Leonidas	Kozakken Boys	Gemert
2012–13	Harkemase Boys	De Treffers	Argon	Capelle	HSV Hoek	SV Deurne
2013–14	ONS Sneek	VV De Bataven	IJsselmeervogels	vv Capelle	ASWH	JVC Cuijk
2014–15	Harkemase Boys	Excelsior '31	IJsselmeervogels	RKAVV	HSV Hoek	JVC Cuijk
2015–16	VV Staphorst	HHC Hardenberg	Magreb '90	VV Noordwijk	ASWH	VV Chevremont
2016–17	VV Staphorst	CSV Apeldoorn	VPV Purmersteijn	VV Noordwijk	HSV Hoek	Blauw Geel '38
2017–18	Flevo Boys	SV DFS	SDO	Sportlust '46	VV Goes	VV Gemert
2018–19	Flevo Boys	VV DUNO	SV Huizen	FC 's-Gravenzande	VV Sliedrecht	RKSV Groene Ster
2020–2021	Cup competitions were halted due to COVID-19					

== See also ==
- Football in the Netherlands
