= 2009–10 KNVB Cup =

Tournament details
- Country: Netherlands
- Teams: 88

Final positions
- Champions: AFC Ajax
- Runners-up: Feyenoord

Tournament statistics
- Top goal scorer: Luis Suárez (8)

The 2009–10 KNVB Cup was the 92nd edition of the Dutch national football knockout tournament for the KNVB Cup. 88 teams contested beginning on 29 August 2009 with the matches of Round 1 and culminated with a double-leg final on 25 April and 6 May 2010.

SC Heerenveen unsuccessfully defended its 2009 title, losing in Round 4 to PSV.

On 15 April, the Royal Dutch Football Association (KNVB) announced that the final was to be played over two legs due to anticipated violence between supporters of participants Ajax and Feyenoord in a rivalry known as the Klassieker. The first leg of the final was staged in Amsterdam on April 25, with winning 2–0. The return followed on 6 May in Rotterdam, with Ajax winning 4–1, therefore 6–1 on aggregate. Ajax qualified for the play-off round of the 2010–11 UEFA Europa League.

== Round 1 ==
Round 1 featured 48 amateur teams. 24 of the Hoofdklasse clubs qualified for the competition through their league performance during the previous season, while the other half of the teams competing in the First Round secured their place through the 2008–09 KNVB District Cups.

The draw for this round was conducted on 7 July 2009. The matches were played on 29 August 2009.

Team 1	Score	Team 2
FC Hilversum	2–5	SV Spakenburg
HSV Hoek	0–1 (aet)	VV Gemert
vv Capelle	2–0	VV UNA
RKSV Groene Ster	2–4	Harkemase Boys
IJsselmeervogels	3–0	HSC '21
RKVV Westlandia	2–0	VV Nunspeet
VV Baronie	3–0	VV Kloetinge
De Treffers	2–1	Go Ahead Kampen
FC Chabab	1–2	WHC Wezep
VV Drachtster Boys	0–2	SC Joure
VV Waspik	0–2	SDC Putten
JVC Cuijk	1–1 (p)	ASWH
EVV	0–4	BVV Barendrecht
Rijnsburgse Boys	3–0	SV Argon
ACV	0–2 (aet)	AFC
GVVV	1–0	WKE
AFC '34	2–1	VV Zaamslag
LRC Leerdam	4–2	Quick '20
Excelsior Maassluis	1–0	SV Rood Wit '62
HBS Craeyenhout	0–2	VV Bennekom
DOVO	0–2	Haaglandia/Sir Winston
VV Schaesberg	1–3	Sparta Nijkerk
Achilles '29	2–1	VV Berkum
HHC Hardenberg	1–2	FC Lisse

== Round 2 ==
The clubs from both the Eredivisie 2009-10 and the Eerste Divisie 2009-10 entered in this round, as well as two youth teams. They joined the 24 winners from Round 1.

Participants:

League	No.
Eredivisie	18
Eerste Divisie	20
Amateur teams (A)	24
Youth teams	2
	64

The draw for this round was conducted on 7 July 2009. The matches were played between 22–24 September 2009.

Team 1	Score	Team 2
SC Joure (A)	0–8	FC Twente
AGOVV Apeldoorn	1–2	AFC Ajax
FC Utrecht	2–4	FC Groningen
AZ	2–0 (aet)	Jong Ajax
PSV	2–1	De Graafschap
SDC Putten (A)	0–7	SC Heerenveen
Willem II	2–3	NAC Breda
Excelsior Maassluis (A)	4–2	VV Bennekom (A)
Haaglandia/SW (A)	6–6 (p)	SBV Excelsior
De Treffers (A)	2–0	BV Veendam
Jong De Graafschap	1–0	SC Cambuur
Rijnsburgse Boys (A)	1–4 (aet)	Go Ahead Eagles
IJsselmeervogels (A)	1–2	Roda JC
FC Omniworld	1–3 (aet)	Helmond Sport
AFC (A)	0–1	WHC Wezep (A)
VV Baronie (A)	1–1 (p)	BVV Barendrecht (A)
Achilles '29 (A)	0–1	VV Gemert (A)
ASWH (A)	2–1	GVVV (A)
FC Lisse (A)	0–4	FC Den Bosch
FC Dordrecht	3–2	Fortuna Sittard
VV Harkemase Boys (A)	0–5	Feyenoord
SV Spakenburg (A)	3–2	MVV
FC Eindhoven	2–3	NEC
AFC '34 (A)	1–6	FC Emmen
LRC Leerdam (A)	1–5	RBC Roosendaal
Sparta Nijkerk (A)	2–2 (p)	FC Zwolle
Heracles Almelo	1–0	RKC Waalwijk
Telstar	1–3	HFC Haarlem
Vitesse Arnhem	5–2	FC Oss
VVV-Venlo	3–0	ADO Den Haag
FC Volendam	1–2 (aet)	Sparta Rotterdam
vv Capelle (A)	4–0	RKVV Westlandia (A)

== Round 3 ==
Round 3 featured the 32 winning teams from round 2. The draw was on 24 September 2009. The matches were played on October 27–29, 2009.

Participants:

League	No.
Eredivisie	14
Eerste Divisie (1)	9
Hoofdklasse amateur teams (A)	8
Youth teams (Y)	1
	32

Team 1	Score	Team 2
VV Gemert (A)	2–2 (p)	WHC Wezep (A)
Roda JC	0–2	PSV
Heracles Almelo	3–0	HFC Haarlem (1)
Sparta Rotterdam	1–1 (p)	VVV-Venlo
NEC	2–1 (aet)	Excelsior (1)
sc Heerenveen	4–2	RBC Roosendaal (1)
AZ	5–2 (aet)	SV Spakenburg (A)
FC Twente	3–0	vv Capelle (A)
Helmond Sport (1)	5–0	ASWH (A)
FC Dordrecht (1)	1–2 (aet)	Ajax
Feyenoord	2–0	FC Den Bosch (1)
Go Ahead Eagles (1)	4–2 (aet)	FC Emmen (1)
De Treffers (A)	1–6	NAC Breda
VV Baronie (A)	1–0 (aet)	Excelsior Maassluis (A)
Vitesse Arnhem	1–5	FC Groningen
Jong De Graafschap (Y)	1–0 (aet)	FC Zwolle (1)

== Round 4 ==
Round 4 featured the 16 winning teams from round 3. The draw was on 29 October 2009. The matches were played on 21–23 December 2009, with the postponed match between SC Heerenveen and PSV being played on 16 January 2010.

Qualified participants:

League	No.
Eredivisie	11
Eerste Divisie (1)	2
Hoofdklasse amateur teams (A)	2
Youth teams (Y)	1
	16

Team 1	Score	Team 2
FC Groningen	0–2	NEC
VV Baronie (A)	0–5	Sparta
FC Twente	3–0	Helmond Sport (1)
Feyenoord	1–0	AZ
Heracles Almelo	0–2	Go Ahead Eagles (1)
WHC Wezep (A)	1–14	Ajax
SC Heerenveen	1–3	PSV
Jong De Graafschap (Y)	0–2 (aet)	NAC Breda

== Quarter finals ==
The quarter finals featured the 8 winning teams from round 4. The draw was on 23 December 2009. The matches were played on 27–28 January 2010.

Qualified participants:

League	No.
Eredivisie	7
Eerste Divisie (1)	1
	8

Team 1	Score	Team 2
NAC Breda	1–2	Go Ahead Eagles (1)
PSV	0–3	Feyenoord
Sparta	0–4	FC Twente
Ajax	3–2 (aet)	NEC

== Semi-finals ==
The semi-finals featured the 4 winning teams from the quarter-finals. The draw was on 27 January 2010. The matches were played on 24 March and 25 March 2010

Qualified participants:

League	No.
Eredivisie	3
Eerste Divisie (1)	1
	4

24 March 2010
20:45 GMT

Feyenoord	2 – 1	FC Twente
van Bronckhorst 53'; Makaay 84'	Report	Ruiz 42'

De Kuip, Rotterdam
Attendance: 45,000
Referee: Ruud Bossen

25 March 2010
20:45 GMT

Go Ahead Eagles	0 – 6	Ajax
	Report	de Zeeuw 11'; Pantelić 38' de Jong 75'; Eriksen 77'; Rommedahl 78'; Lodeiro 85'

Adelaarshorst, Deventer
Attendance: 6,439
Referee: Jack van Hulten

== Final ==
The final would originally have been played as a single match on 25 April 2010 at De Kuip, Rotterdam. However, on 15 April the Dutch FA announced that the final was going to be played over two matches, because Ajax supporters were not allowed to visit matches in De Kuip since 2009 and vice versa. The first leg was played at Amsterdam as scheduled before, and the return leg competed on 6 May at Rotterdam. This was the first two-leg final since the 1982–83 KNVB Cup Final.

25 April 2010
18:00 UTC+2

Ajax	2–0	Feyenoord
De Jong 6', 7'	(Report)

Amsterdam Arena, Amsterdam
Attendance: 37,283
Referee: Eric Braamhaar

6 May 2010
18:30 UTC+2

Feyenoord	1–4	Ajax
Tomasson 72'	(Report)	Suárez 4', 82'; De Jong 64', 77'

De Kuip, Rotterdam
Attendance: 35,000
Referee: Roelof Luinge
