= Luc Wulterkens =

Dutch footballer

Personal information
- Full name: Luc Wulterkens
- Date of birth: 11 March 1990 (age 36)
- Place of birth: Netherlands
- Height: 1.84 m (6 ft 1/2 in)
- Position: Centre-back

Youth career
- Geelen Zuid
- Fortuna Sittard

Senior career*
| Years | Team | Apps | (Gls) |
| 2008–2009 | Fortuna Sittard | 4 | (0) |
| 2009–2011 | Vinkenslag | | |
| 2011–2014 | Groene Ster | | |
| 2014–2015 | EVV | 13 | (0) |
| 2015–2016 | DSK Shivajians | | |
- * Club domestic league appearances and goals as of 15:47, 12 January 2016 (UTC)

Luc Wulterkens (born 11 March 1990) is a Dutch footballer, who plays as a centre-back

== Career ==
=== Fortuna Sittard ===
Wulterkens joined Fortuna Sittard in 2008. He started his career at the Fortuna youth system. He played for the U19s and then the Sittard U21s before joining the first team. He made his first team debut in the 0–0 draw against FC Dordrecht. Luc left Sittard to join Vinkenslag in 2009 after making four first team appearances for the club.

=== Vinkenslag ===
Luc joined Vinkenslag in 2009. He left the club to join RKSV Groene Ster in 2011.

=== Groene Ster ===
Wulterkens joined Groene Ster in 2011 and made his first team debut in the 4–2 loss at VV Staphorst. He went on to spend 4 years with the club.

=== EVV ===
Luc joined Dutch club EVV in 2014. In the year he spent with Echt, he picked up two yellow cards while he played 13 matches for the club. He played his last match for the club in a 1–0 win against HSC '21

=== DSK Shivajians ===
Wulterkens then signed for Indian I-League club DSK Shivajians in 2015 after leaving EVV. He scored his first goal for the Shivajians in the 7–0 thrashing of Vincentian Old Boys in a friendly match.

=== Mallorca Body Coaching and Mindfulness ===
After his football career, Wulterkens started a career in mindfulness coaching.
