= Byron Burgering =

Dutch footballer

Personal information
- Date of birth: 28 November 2000 (age 25)
- Place of birth: Houten, Netherlands
- Height: 1.74 m (5 ft 9 in)
- Position: Forward

Team information
- Current team: Almere City
- Number: 9

Youth career
- 2008-2016: FC Delta Sports '95
- 2016–2018: VV 't Goy
- 2016–2018: FC Delta Sports '95
- 2018–2019: FC Eindhoven

Senior career*
Years	Team	Apps	(Gls)
2019–2020	Eindhoven	1	(0)
2020–2021	Sportlust '46	0	(0)
2020–2022	Miedź Legnica II	33	(9)
2022–2024	GVVV	87	(41)
2024–2025	Den Bosch	42	(10)
2025–	Almere City	26	(8)
- * Club domestic league appearances and goals as of 28 April 2026

Byron Burgering (born 28 November 2000) is a Dutch professional footballer who plays as a forward for Eerste Divisie club Almere City.

== Club career ==
Burgering made his debut for FC Eindhoven in August 2019. In February 2021, he signed for Miedź Legnica.

On 27 April 2024, Burgering signed a two-year contract with FC Den Bosch, beginning in the 2024–25 season.

On 20 June 2025, Burgering joined Almere City, signing a three-year contract with an option to extend.

== Career statistics ==
As of match played 16 September 2024

Appearances and goals by club, season and competition
Club	Season	League			National cup (Note: Includes KNVB Cup)		Continental		Other		Total	
Club	Season	Division	Apps	Goals	Apps	Goals	Apps	Goals	Apps	Goals	Apps	Goals
FC Eindhoven	2019–20	Eerste Divisie	1	0	1	0	—		0	0	2	0
Miedź Legnica II	2020–21	III liga, group III	16	1	—		—		—		16	1
Miedź Legnica II	2021–22	III liga, group III	17	8	—		—		—		17	8
Miedź Legnica II	Total		33	9	0	0	0	0	0	0	33	9
GVVV	2021–22	Tweede Divisie	20	12	0	0	—		6 (Note: Appearances in the Tweede Divisie relegation playoffs)	3	26	15
GVVV	2022–23	Derde Divisie	33	24	2	0	—		6	3	41	27
GVVV	2023–24	Tweede Divisie	34	5	3	1	—		—		37	6
GVVV	Total		87	41	5	1	0	0	12	6	104	48
FC Den Bosch	2024–25	Eerste Divisie	38	10	1	0	—		3 (Note: Appearances in the Eerste Divisie Promotion playoffs)	0	42	10
Almere City FC	2025–26	Eerste Divisie	5	6	0	0	—		0	0	5	6
Career total			164	66	7	1	0	0	15	6	186	73
