= Joep op de Kamp =

Dutch footballer

Personal information
- Date of birth: 22 January 1985 (age 41)
- Place of birth: Weert, Netherlands
- Position: Defender

Senior career*
Years	Team	Apps	(Gls)
2004–2008	Fortuna Sittard		
2008–2017	RKVV EVV		
- * Club domestic league appearances and goals

Joep op de Kamp (born 22 January 1985) is a retired Dutch football defender.
