= VV Hoogland =

Dutch football club

Hoogland
- Full name: Voetbalvereniging Hoogland
- Nickname: Superboeren (Super Farmers)
- Founded: 1 June 1946; 79 years ago
- Ground: Sportpark Langenoord, Hoogland
- Capacity: 1,800
- Manager: Raymond Prins
- League: Vierde Divisie
- 2024–25: Vierde Divisie A, 5th of 16
- Website: https://www.vvhoogland.nl/
Home colours

Voetbalvereniging Hoogland, more commonly known as VV Hoogland or simply Hoogland (Dutch pronunciation: [ˈɦoːxlɑnt]), is a Dutch football club based in the town of Hoogland, Utrecht. Formed on 1 June 1946, they play in the Vierde Divisie, the fifth tier of the Dutch football league system, and have spent most of their history in the lower amateur tiers. Their home ground is Sportpark Langenoord.

== History ==
VV Hoogland was founded shortly after World War II on 1 June 1946, after local youths decided to organise association football in the area in one club. The team began its inaugural season in the local Tweede Klasse—the lowest tier of Dutch football at the time. The popular support that football saw during the postwar years meant an increase in clubs, and Hoogland had to participate in the newly founded Derde Klasse shortly afterwards—the new lowest tier.

Hoogland mainly played in the basement of Dutch football during the following decades, shifting between participation in the Derde and Vierde Klasse, which were the fourth and fifth amateur levels. The club, however, saw a rapid rise in the late 2000s, reaching promotion to the Eerste Klasse in 2011.

After winning the Eerste Klasse championship in 2016, Hoogland reached the Hoofdklasse Sunday for the first time in the 2016–17 season. With a fifteenth place in the following season, however, relegation back to the Eerste Klasse ensued. This was followed by two promotions in a row, both after play-offs, which meant that the club played in the fourth-tier Derde Divisie for the first time in club history in the 2019–20 season. At that point, the club was the highest classified and largest club in the Amersfoort Municipality.

== See also ==
- Category:VV Hoogland players
