= Adriaan Kruisheer =

Dutch association football player

Personal information
- Date of birth: 7 October 1997 (age 29)
- Place of birth: Almere, Netherlands
- Height: 1.81 m (5 ft 11 1/2 in)
- Position: Midfielder

Youth career
- Almere City

Senior career*
Years	Team	Apps	(Gls)
2016–2018	Almere City	0	(0)
2018	Kemi City	0	(0)
2018–2020	Sparta Nijkerk		
2020–	DVS '33	5	(0)
- * Club domestic league appearances and goals as of 13 November 2020

Adriaan Kruisheer (born 7 October 1997) is a Dutch footballer who plays as a midfielder for DVS '33.

He came up through the youth ranks of Almere City, and even captained the under-21 team in the fourth tier. Disillusioned on his chances of breaking into the first team, he made the move to Finnish top-flight side Kemi City in January 2018. He made his professional debut with the team during a Finnish Cup game against MuSa on 11 February, and scored in stoppage time to secure a 2–2 draw. Without playing any league games, though, internal problems in the club led him to abruptly move back to the Netherlands. He spent time with Sparta Nijkerk and signed with DVS '33 in 2020.

== Personal life ==
He lives in Amsterdam and studies business administration at Vrije Universiteit Amsterdam.
