= Raymond de Vries =

Dutch footballer (1965–2020)

Personal information
- Date of birth: 25 March 1965
- Place of birth: Utrecht, Netherlands
- Date of death: 2 November 2020 (aged 55)
- Place of death: Utrecht, Netherlands
- Position: Left winger

Youth career
- VV Utrecht

Senior career*
Years	Team	Apps	(Gls)
1985–1986	FC Utrecht	3	(0)
1986–1987	Emmen	34	(7)
1987–1991	Vitesse	65	(12)
1991	→ Zwolle		
1991-	Hollandia		
- * Club domestic league appearances and goals

Raymond de Vries (25 March 1965 – 2 November 2020) was a Dutch footballer who played as a winger.

== Club career ==
After joining from hometown club FC Utrecht in 1986, de Vries scored 7 goals in 34 league matches for second tier-side Emmen.

He scored 12 goals in 65 league games for Vitesse and won promotion to the Eredivisie with them in 1989. He only played one game for them in the top flight.

== Personal life ==
A lover of horror movies, de Vries died after a short illness in November 2020.
