= Jan Gielens =

Dutch footballer

Personal information
- Full name: Joannes Bonefacius Gielens
- Date of birth: 17 August 1903
- Place of birth: Born, Netherlands
- Date of death: 26 July 1964 (aged 60)
- Place of death: Utrecht, Netherlands

Senior career*
Years	Team	Apps	(Gls)
1923–1925	Willem II		
1925–1927	Hercules		

International career
1925–1926	Netherlands	9	(1)
- * Club domestic league appearances and goals

Jan Gielens (17 August 1903 – 26 July 1964) was a Dutch footballer. He played in nine matches for the Netherlands national football team from 1925 to 1926.
