= Shanon Carmelia =

Curaçaoan professional footballer (born 1989)

Personal information
- Full name: Shanon David Carmelia
- Date of birth: 20 March 1989 (age 37)
- Place of birth: Boca Samí, Netherlands Antilles
- Position: Right-back

Team information
- Current team: USV Hercules
- Number: 20

Senior career*
Years	Team	Apps	(Gls)
2006–2007	Jong Colombia		
2007–2008	CSD Barber		
2008–2010	Jong NEC		
2010–2012	NEC Amateurs		
2012–2016	JVC Cuijk	110	(8)
2016–2019	IJsselmeervogels	77	(3)
2019–2020	Lienden	15	(0)
2020–2021	DOVO	5	(0)
2022–	USV Hercules	115	(3)

International career^{‡}
2008	Netherlands Antilles	1	(0)
2011	Curaçao U23	3	(2)
2011–2022	Curaçao	38	(2)
- * Club domestic league appearances and goals as of 20:55, 4 August 2025 (UTC) ‡ National team caps and goals as of 24 September 2022

Shanon David Carmelia (born 20 March 1989) is a Curaçaoan professional footballer who plays as a right-back for USV Hercules and the Curaçao national team.

== Career ==
Born in Boca Samí, Curaçao, in the former Netherlands Antilles, he formerly played for Deportivo Barber, NEC, JVC Cuijk and FC Lienden. Carmelia moved to Derde Divisie club vv DOVO after the 2019–20 season.

In February 2022 he signed for USV Hercules.

== Honours ==
=== Club ===
IJsselmeervogels

- Derde Divisie: 2016–17

=== International ===
Curaçao

- Caribbean Cup: 2017
- King's Cup: 2019
