= ODIN '59 =

Association football club in Heemskerk, Netherlands

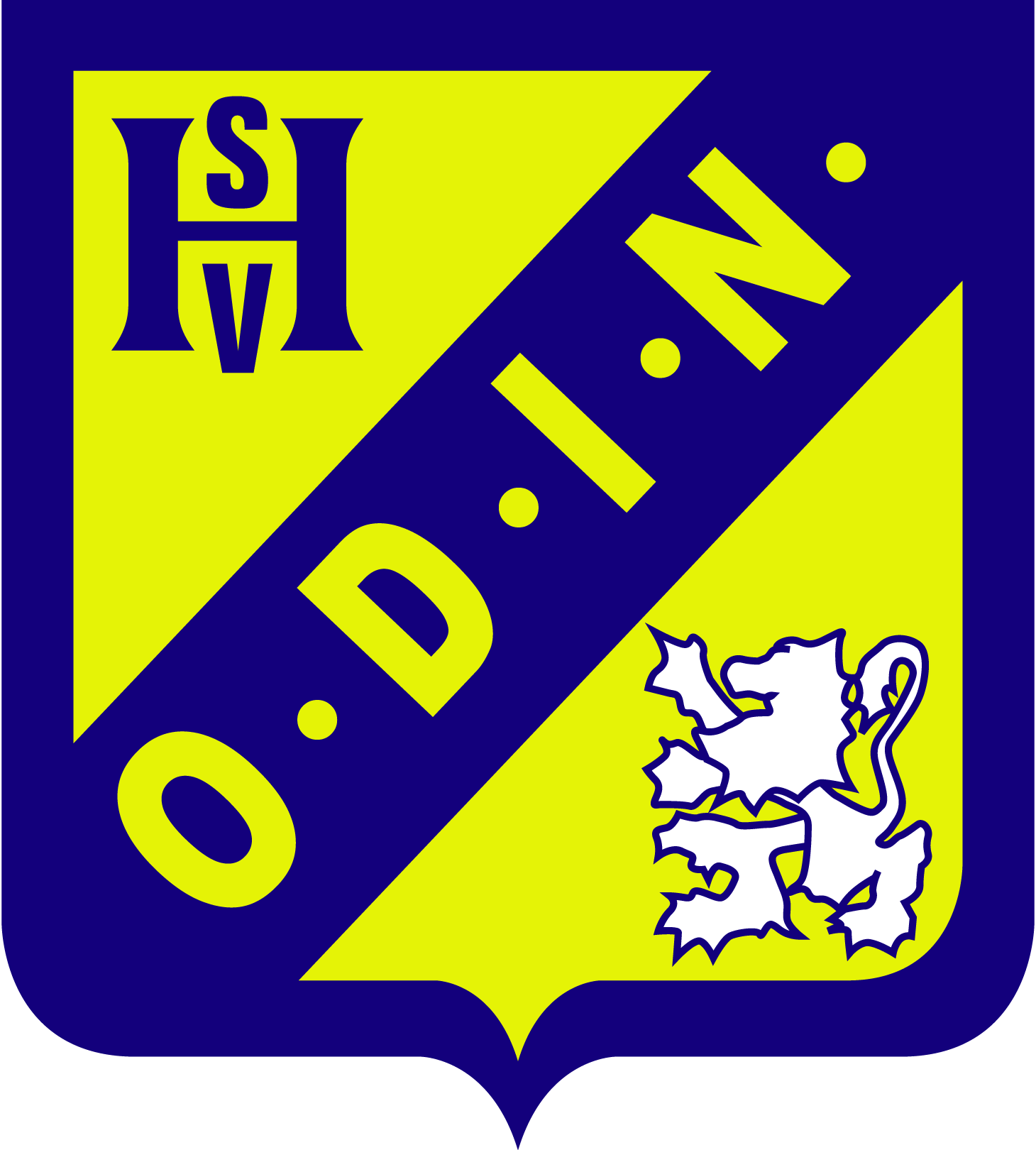
- Full name: Heemskerkse Sportvereniging Ons Doel Is Nuttig '59
- Nickname: De gele leeuwen ("The yellow lions")
- Founded: 17 December 1959; 66 years ago
- Ground: Sportpark Assumburg, Heemskerk
- Capacity: 3,000
- Chairman: Wilco Verschoor
- Manager: Patrick van Leeuwen
- League: Vierde Divisie
- 2024–25: Vierde Divisie A, 11th of 16
- Website: odin59.nl
| Home colours | Away colours |

HSV ODIN '59 is a football club from Heemskerk, Netherlands. The club was founded in 1959 and is currently playing in the Vierde Divisie. ODIN stands for Ons Doel Is Nuttig (Our goal is useful).

In the 2021–22 season, ODIN lost in the first round of the relegation playoffs, and were relegated to the Hoofdklasse.

== History ==
ODIN '59 (Ons Doel Is Nuttig 1959) was founded on 17 December 1959 in Heemskerk, North Holland, during a period of rapid urban and industrial development associated with employment at nearby Hoogovens. The football branch was established shortly after the club's volleyball and korfball sections. Founded by Jan Milikan, Jan Overvliet, Cor Blok and Joop de Graaf, the name "ODIN" ("Our Goal Is Useful") was chosen to reflect the club's founding ethos, with the suffix '59 later added at the request of the Royal Dutch Football Association (KNVB). Contrary to assumptions, Saturday football was adopted not for religious reasons but due to the shift work schedules of local steelworkers.

The club began at Hoogdorperweg with modest facilities, gradually expanding its fields and constructing a heated canteen and a clubhouse by 1966. In the early 1960s, ODIN '59 rose quickly through the Haarlemse Voetbalbond (HVB), earning multiple promotions. By 1970, it had reached the KNVB's Vierde Klasse, completing a decade in which the club's membership expanded from fewer than 60 to nearly 400, fielding 11 senior and 18 youth teams.

The 1970s brought both structural changes and competitive setbacks. After briefly dropping back to the HVB in 1972, ODIN '59 returned to the national system by 1975. That same decade saw the move to a new facility at Hoflaan, culminating in the construction of a permanent clubhouse near Slot Assumburg in 1974.

During the 1980s, the club implemented new governance policies and technical frameworks. Promotion to the Derde Klasse came in 1982, followed by a second-place finish the next season. However, player departures led to declining results by the mid-1980s. A resurgence in 1989–90 saw the first team win a period title under the KNVB's new system, narrowly missing promotion to the Tweede Klasse after a play-off defeat. Meanwhile, the club expanded its reserve teams and modernised its training infrastructure, converting gravel fields to grass with support from local fundraising.

The 1990s were mixed: the first team remained in the Derde Klasse, but failed in several promotion play-off attempts and faced relegation in 1996. A league restructuring, however, allowed the club to retain its status within the newly formed KNVB District West I. A strategic shift followed in 1997, focusing on youth development, player retention, and infrastructure investment. These efforts paid off in the 1998–99 season when ODIN '59 clinched the Derde Klasse title, defeating SMS 6–0 in a decisive match.

The early 2000s saw further professionalisation. A financial committee, technical management staff, and new governance systems were introduced, alongside facility improvements such as additional floodlights, an artificial turf pitch, and the expansion of the clubhouse. The club also introduced girls' football and formalised youth development.

On the pitch, the club secured promotions in 2001 and 2009, reaching the Hoofdklasse for the first time during its 50th anniversary season. ODIN '59 finished ninth in its debut season, missing out on the newly formed Topklasse. A high point came in 2018 when ODIN '59 defeated Emmen 3–1 in the KNVB Cup, gaining national attention. The club went on to compete regularly in the Derde Divisie, cementing its status as one of the leading amateur sides in the Netherlands.

Following a nationwide league restructuring in 2022, ODIN '59 began competing in the Vierde Divisie. Under head coach Richard Plug, the club secured promotion to the Derde Divisie in the 2022–23 season, but were relegated after just one year at that level.

== Managers ==
| From | To | Manager |
|---|---|---|
| 1959 | 1961 | |
| 1961 | 1963 | Henk van de Wateren |
| 1965 | 1969 | Piet Dijkman |
| 1969 | 1971 | Toon Dekker |
| 1971 | 1975 | Wim Nieuwenhuis |
| 1975 | 1978 | Jan Muskee |
| 1978 | 1980 | Paul Kerssens |
| 1980 | 1982 | Cees Glas |
| 1982 | 1985 | Jan van der Steen |
| 1985 | 1990 | Hennie van Es |
| 1990 | 1994 | Fred de Boer |
| 1994 | 1995 | Ron van Aanholt |
| 1995 | 1998 | Hennie van Es |

| From | To | Manager |
|---|---|---|
| 1998 | 2002 | Cees Bruinink |
| 2002 | 2007 | Jacques Koster |
| 2007 | 2012 | Rowdy Bakker |
| 2012 | 2015 | Mark Evers |
| 2015 | 2019 | Richard Plug |
| 2019 | 2020 | Anthony Correia |
| 2020 | 2021 | Ted Verdonkschot |
| 2021 | 2022 | Alex Geernaert |
| 2022 | 2023 | Richard Plug |
| 2023 | 2024 | Mark Kranendonk |
| 2024 | 2025 | Arjan de Zeeuw |
| 2025 | Present | Patrick van Leeuwen |

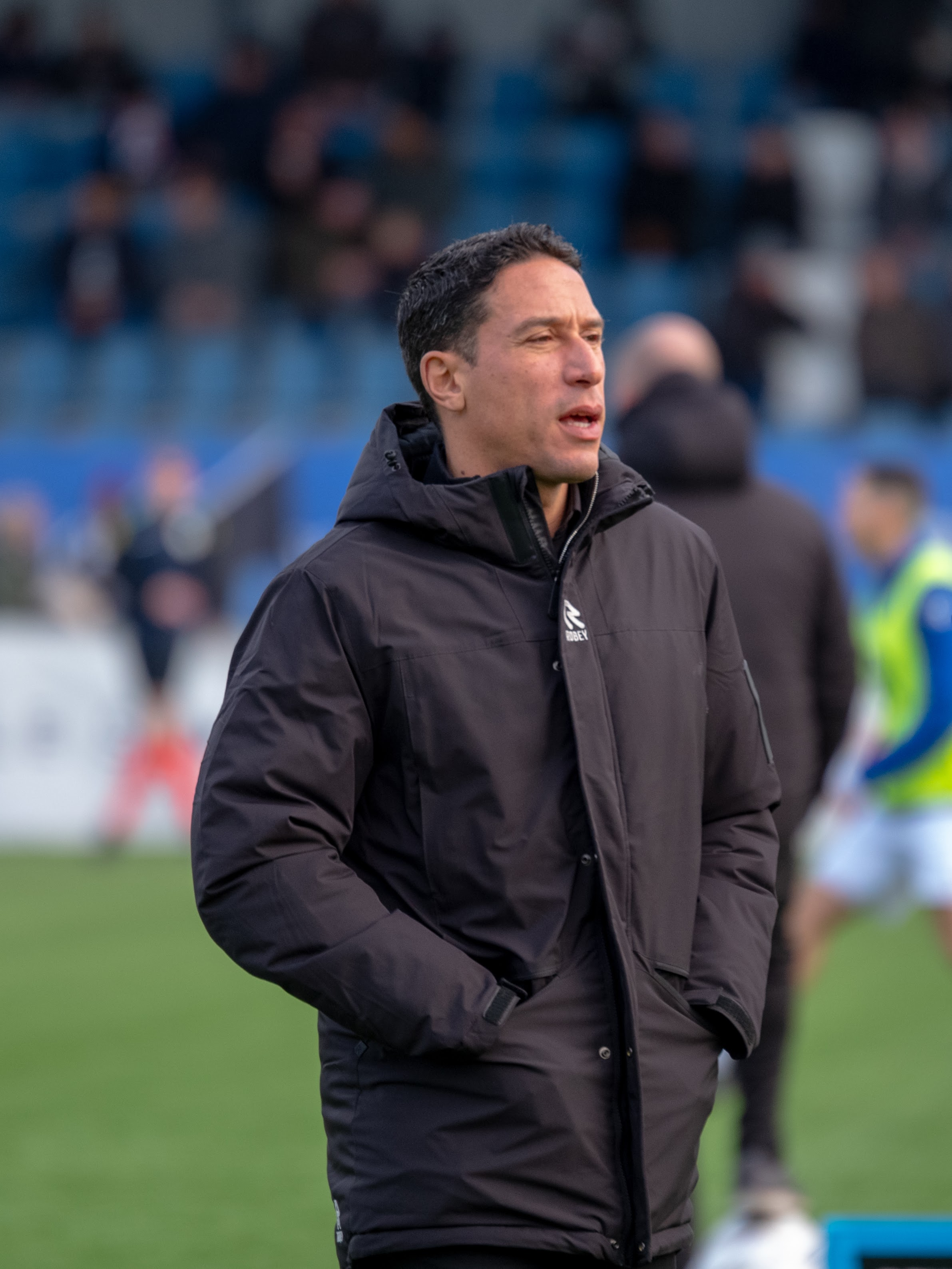
Anthony Correia managed ODIN '59 in the 2019–20 season.

== Honours ==
| Honour | Year(s) |
|---|---|
| Hoofdklasse; Saturday A champions | 2015–16 |
| Eerste Klasse | 2009–10 |
| Tweede Klasse | 2000–01 |
| Derde Klasse | 1998–99 |
| Vierde Klasse | 1981–82 |
| KNVB District Cup; West I winner | 2010–11 |
