= RKSV Groene Ster =

Dutch football club

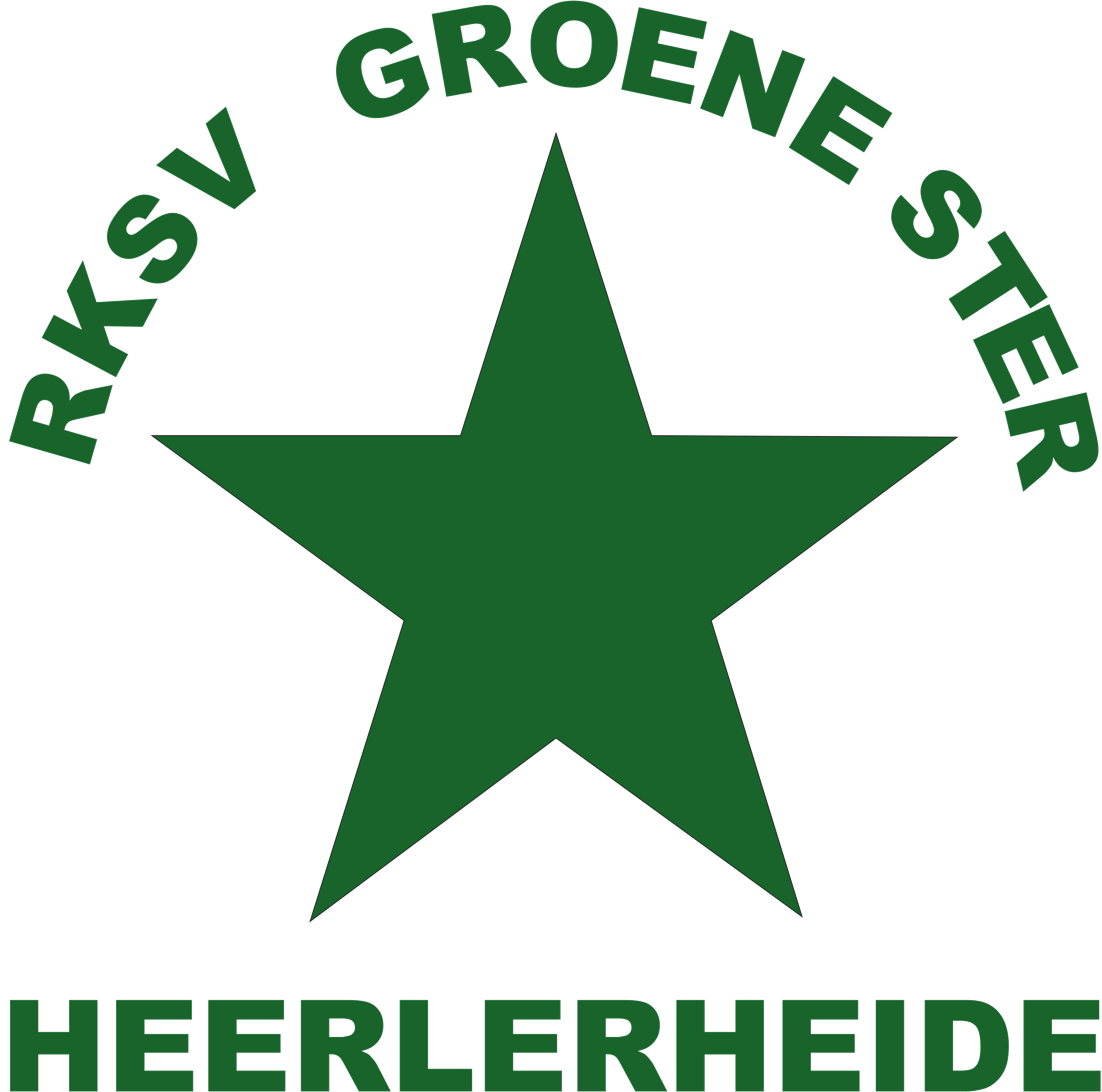
- Full name: Rooms-Katholieke Sportvereniging Groene Ster
- Founded: 2 November 1926; 100 years ago
- Ground: Pronsebroek, Heerlerheide
- Capacity: 2,500
- Chairman: Jos op 't Eijnde
- Manager: Jordy Reneerkens
- League: Derde Divisie
- 2025–26: Derde Divisie B, 14th of 18
- Website: http://www.groenester.nl/
Home colours

RKSV Groene Ster is a Dutch football club based in Heerlerheide. The club play its home games at Pronsebroek. The club colours, reflected in their crest, kit and name, are green and white. Formed on 2 November 1926, the club have mostly played in the lower tiers of Dutch football, but reached the final of the nationwide KNVB Cup in 1943–44, where they however lost to with a record 9–1 score to winners Willem II. This result still stands as the biggest defeat in a KNVB Cup final. The club are currently playing in the Vierde Divisie (fifth tier).

Groene Ster won the KNVB District Cup in the Zuid 2 (South 2) District in 2009 and 2019.

== History ==
The KNVB Cup final in 1944 between Willem II and Groene Ster

In the 1931–32 season, Groene Ster was promoted to the Tweede Klasse and in the following years emerged mainly as a cup-fighter. In 1944, the club played in the KNVB Cup final against Willem II, where they however lost to with a record 9–1 score. This result still stands as the biggest defeat in a KNVB Cup final. In 1950, Groene Ster first eliminated NAC and then managed a draw against PSV in the following round. However, the result was ultimately not enough to advance in the tournament.

In later years, Groene Ster mainly competed in the Vierde Klasse and Derde Klasse, but in the 1993–94 season, the green-whites finally won promotion. Four seasons later, in the 1997–98 season, they became champions in the Tweede Klasse Zonday and in the 2002–03 season, they also won a championship in the Eerste Klasse Zondag, resulting in promotion to the fifth-tier Hoofdklasse. Their place in the division was maintained for two seasons, but in the 2005–06 season, Groene Ster again suffered relegation to the Eerste Klasse Zondag, to promptly become champion again that same season, propelling them back to the Hoofdklasse. Another relegation followed, however, as Groene Ster finished 13th and the club would compete in the Eerste Klasse for the 2007–08 season.

Manager Silvio Diliberto became the club's head coach until the 2010–11 season. He became one of the most successful coaches in the history of Groene Ster. Between 2007 and 2010, the club consecutively reached the main rounds of the KNVB Cup and three consecutive seasons they reached the KNVB District Cup finals for the South 2 district.

In the 2010–11 season, Ed Hendriks returned as head coach after a four season hiatus. The club convincingly won the championship and thus promoted to the Hoofdklasse and qualified for the main rounds of the KNVB Cup where they lost 2–4 to VV Staphorst in the first round.

The team from South Limburg stayed in the Hoofdklasse for a number of season, until Groene Ster eventually became champions of the Hoofklasse Zondag B in the 2018–19 season, promoting them to the Derde Divisie. The fourth-tier division in the Netherlands, the promotion marked the first time in club history that Groene Ster reached that level. In the Derde Divisie Zondag group, Groene Ster were accompanied by fellow Limburg club EVV. This made Groene Ster and EVV – after the professional sides of MVV Maastricht, Fortuna Sittard, Roda JC Kerkrade and VVV-Venlo – the highest ranked football teams in the province. On 30 October 2019, Groene Ster defeated Eredivisie club VVV-Venlo in a penalty shoot-out in the KNVB Cup. In the following round, Groene Ster lost to AZ.

== Honours ==
- Hoofdklasse
  - Winners: 2018–19
- Eerste Klasse
  - Winners: 2002–03, 2005–06, 2010–11
- Tweede Klasse
  - Winners: 1997–98
- KNVB Cup
  - Runners-up: 1943–44
- KNVB District Cup - South II
  - Winners: 2008–09, 2018–19

== See also ==
- Category:RKSV Groene Ster players
