= USV Hercules =

Dutch football club

- Full name: Utrechtse Sportvereniging Hercules
- Founded: 22 April 1882; 144 years ago
- Ground: Sportpark Voordorp; Utrecht, Netherlands
- Capacity: 1,000
- Chairman: John Bolte
- Manager: Younes el Yandouzi
- League: Derde Divisie
- 2025–26: Derde Divisie A, 13th of 18
- Website: http://www.usvhercules.nl/
Home colours

Utrechtse Sportvereniging Hercules (Utrecht Sports Association Hercules), also known as USV Hercules, Hercules Utrecht or simply Hercules, is an amateur football club in Utrecht, Netherlands. In 2014 it joined the Derde Divisie (then still known as Topklasse) after playing just one year in the Hoofdklasse.

== History ==
In 2017, USV Hercules led 1–0 against FC Groningen in the national KNVB Cup but went on to lose the game 2–1.

In the 2021–22 season, USV Hercules qualified for the promotion playoffs, but lost 6–3 on aggregate to DVS '33 in the first round.

Hercules qualified for the promotion playoffs again in the 2022–23 season. After defeating IJsselmeervogels 11–0 on aggregate in the first round, they lost 3–1 on aggregate to GVVV in the second round.

In the 2023–24 KNVB Cup Round of 32, the club made history, winning 3–2 against Dutch giants AFC Ajax with a 93rd-minute winner.

In the 2023–24 Derde Divisie, Hercules finished 4th and qualified for the promotion playoffs, but lost to Tweede Divisie side Excelsior Maassluis 4–1 on aggregate.

== Former players ==
=== National team players ===
The following players were called up to represent their national teams in international football and received caps during their tenure with USV Hercules:

- Curaçao
  - (Curaçao) **Shanon Carmelia (2022–present)**
  Netherlands
  - (Netherlands) Wout Buitenweg (1924–1936)
  - (Netherlands) Philip van Dijk (1901–1914)
  - (Netherlands) Jan Gielens (1925–1926)

- Players in bold actively play for Hercules and for their respective national teams. Years in brackets indicate careerspan with USV Hercules.
