= Sparta Nijkerk =

Dutch football club

- Full name: Voetbalvereniging Sparta Nijkerk
- Nickname: de Heurders
- Founded: 1931
- Ground: De Ebbenhorst; Nijkerk
- Capacity: 5,350
- Manager: Marco Roelofsen
- League: Derde Divisie
- 2025–26: Derde Divisie A, 5th of 18
Home colours	Away colours

Voetbalvereniging Sparta Nijkerk, is an association football club from Nijkerk, Netherlands. The club was founded in 1931, is currently (season 2026–27) playing in the Derde Divisie.

== History ==
In one of their notable matches, Sparta Nijkerk suffered a 2–0 defeat to ADO Den Haag in the first round of the 2021–22 KNVB Cup.

In the 2021–22 season, Sparta Nijkerk qualified for the promotion playoffs, but lost 3–1 on aggregate to HSC '21 in the first round.
