= VV Gemert =

Dutch football club

Gemert
- Full name: Voetbalvereniging Gemert
- Founded: 15 October 1912; 113 years ago
- Ground: Sportpark Molenbroek, Gemert
- Capacity: 4,000
- Chairman: Carlo Hazenveld
- Manager: Reinald Boeren (retired May 2025)
- League: Derde Divisie
- 2024–25: Derde Divisie B, 5th of 18
- Website: https://www.vvgemert.nl/
Home colours

Voetbalvereniging Gemert is a football club from Gemert, North Brabant, Netherlands. They compete in the Derde Divisie.

== History ==
Gemert's recent appearances in the Dutch national cup were in 2006–07, 2009–10, 2010–11, and 2012–13. In 2012–13 it reached the second round, in 2010–11 it reached the third round.

In the 2021–22 season, Gemert qualified for the promotion playoffs, but lost 4–1 on aggregate to GVVV in the first round.
