= Hoogland =

- Coat of arms
- Interactive map of Hoogland
- Coordinates: 52°11′14″N 5°22′28″E
- Country: Netherlands
- Province: Utrecht (province)
- Municipality: Amersfoort

Population (2006)
  - Total: 10,587
- Postal code: 3828
- Area code: +31 (0)33

Hoogland (Dutch pronunciation: [ˈɦoːxlɑnt]) is a village and former free-standing municipality in the province of Utrecht in the Netherlands. It is located north of the Amersfoort city centre. The village population is 10,587 people (2006).

Since 1974, Hoogland has been a part of the municipality of Amersfoort. Until that time, around the 1950s, Hoogland grew vastly in the areas Langenoord and Bieshaar. Nowadays, Hoogland-west is the only outer part of Hoogland which is uncultivated. Although Hoogland got more surrounded by the new housing of Amersfoort (Kattenbroek, Nieuwland and Schothorst), the village characteristics stayed intact.

== Schools ==
Hoogland has six primary schools: De Biezen, de Bieshaar, de Berkenschool, De Horizon, de Kosmos and the Langenoord. The schools ‘De Biezen’ and ‘de Bieshaar’ are in front of each other. The ‘Biezen’ is a Roman Catholic school and the ‘Bieshaar’ is a public school. The ‘Berkenschool’ lies in front of the ‘Berkenvijver’ (a pond). The ‘Langenoord’ lies in the part which is called ‘Langenoord’. The ‘Horizon’ is a Reformed school. The ’Kosmos’ is the school which is in the outer corner of Hoogland.
