= VVOG =

Dutch football club

- Full name: Voetbalvereniging Ons Genoegen
- Founded: 13 May 1927
- Ground: De Strokel, Harderwijk
- Capacity: 2.500
- Chairman: Fred Moll
- Manager: Hans van Arum
- League: Eerste Klasse (V)
- 2024–25: Vierde Divisie A, 13th of 18 (relegated via play-offs)
- Website: http://www.vvog.nl/
Home colours

VVOG is a football club from Harderwijk, Netherlands. They currently participate in the Eerste Klasse, the fifth tier of the Dutch football league system.

The club's name, Voetbalvereniging Ons Genoegen, translates as Football Club Our Pleasure. VVOG became the champion in Dutch Saturday and national amateur football in 1968. The club won the Districtsbeker for the East district in 2003.
