= Harkemase Boys =

Dutch football club

- Full name: Voetbalvereniging Harkemase Boys
- Nicknames: De Boys, Harrekieten
- Founded: 26 June 1946; 80 years ago
- Ground: De Bosk; Harkema
- Capacity: 7,000
- Chairman: Sippe Heeringa
- Manager: Marcel Post
- League: Derde Divisie
- 2025–26: Derde Divisie A, 7th of 18
Home colours	Away colours

Harkemase Boys is a football club from Harkema, The Netherlands. The club plays in the Derde Divisie since 2016, when it won a section championship in the Hoofdklasse.

== History ==
On 27 October 2021, they became one of 3 Derde Divisie teams to advance to the 2021–22 KNVB Cup second round, as they beat VV DOVO 2–1 thanks to an extra time goal from Arnoud Bentum.

In the 2023–24 season, Harkemase Boys qualified for the Tweede Divisie promotion playoffs. After defeating SteDoCo on penalties in the first round, Harkemase Boys lost 3–2 on aggregate to Tweede Divisie side Excelsior Maassluis.

== See also ==
- Category:Harkemase Boys players
