= Heerlerheide =

Heerlerheide Gen Hei
- Village
- Location within Netherlands
- Coordinates: 50°55′10″N 5°57′50″E
- Country: Netherlands
- Province: Limburg
- Municipality: Heerlen

Population (2007)
  - Total: 3,180
- Postcode: 6413

Heerlerheide (Limburgish: Heëlehei or Gen Hei, lit. 'Heath near Heerlen'), is a Dutch village located in the commune of Heerlen, in the province of Dutch Limburg. On 1 January 2007, the village had 3,180 inhabitants.
