= RKVV EVV =

Dutch association football club

EVV Echt
- Full name: Echter Voetbal Vereniging
- Nickname: Oos EVV'ke
- Founded: 1926; 100 years ago
- Ground: Sportpark "In De Bandert"; Echt-Susteren
- Capacity: 2,000
- Chairman: Geert Hees
- Manager: Dominik Vergoossen
- League: Derde Divisie
- 2025–26: Vierde Divisie C, 2nd of 16 (promoted via play-offs)
Home colours

EVV Echt, an abbreviation for Echter Voetbal Vereniging Echt, is an association football club from Echt-Susteren, Netherlands. Its colours are blue and white.

The club was founded on 26 June 1926 and plays in the Derde Divisie; the fourth tier of the Dutch football pyramid. They were one of the teams to participate in the first season of the newly established Topklasse league in 2010–11.

== History ==
=== Early years ===
The history of the sports club started in 1908, when the club EVV Sparta was founded. In 1925, this club went bankrupt. A year after EVV Sparta went bankrupt, EVV Echt was founded. The club was founded in the former Oranjehotel on the Jodenstraat. The first game was played on 24 October 1926, as EVV lost 2–4 to Helden.

In 1931, EVV won a championship for the first time. The club also moved to the Nieuwe Markt. Success was again achieved in 1940. The "Baron de Vexela Coupe" was won by EVV. During the war years, hardly any football was played, and EVV played in the so-called "Emergency Competition".

=== Hoofdklasse (2003–10) ===
In the 2003–04 season, EVV were crowned champion in the Eerste Klasse D and for the first time in club history reached promotion to the highest league of amateur football; de Sunday Hoofdklasse B. From the 2004–05 season, EVV began playing continuously in that division. In the 2005–06 season, EVV won the final in the South II district over JVC Cuijk to win the district cup 4–0. EVV also reached the national final of amateur football in the same season but lost 1–3 to ASWH. The objective in the 2009–10 season was promotion to the newly formed Topklasse. This was reached in the final day of the competition, by winning the away game against RKSV Schijndel with 0–3. This resulted in EVV finishing in 3rd place.

=== Topklasse and Derde Divisie (2010–present) ===
The first season in the Topklasse (2010–11) ended in ninth place. The objective, maintaining its position in the Topklasse, was therefore already achieved six matches before the end of the competition. The second season in the Topklasse (2011–12) went even better. Partly thanks to a very strong final series (only one defeat in the last eleven matches), EVV ended the season in sixth place. In the 2012–13 season, Leo Beckers took over the head coaching seat at EVV. After a difficult start, things improved and EVV finished in fifth place. The following season another fifth place was reached (with a record number of points of 52), a third round exit in the KNVB Cup and a final place in the district cup ensured that the 2013–14 season became the most successful in club history. In addition, goalkeeper Michel Vercruysse was voted Best Goalkeeper of the Sunday Topklasse after the end of that season.

== See also ==
- Category:RKVV EVV players
