= Derde Divisie =

Vierde Divisie
- Founded: 2010 as Topklasse
- Country: Netherlands
- Confederation: UEFA
- Divisions: 4
- Number of clubs: 36
- Level on pyramid: 4
- Promotion to: Tweede Divisie
- Relegation to: Vierde Divisie
- Domestic cup: KNVB Cup
- Current champions: Saturday: ACV; Sunday: ADO '20 (2022–23)
- Most championships: SV Spakenburg (3 Saturday titles)
- Current: 2025–26 Derde Divisie

The Derde Divisie (Dutch pronunciation: [ˈdɛrdə diˈvizi]; English: Third Division), formerly known as Topklasse (Dutch pronunciation: [ˈtɔpklɑsə]; English: Top Class), is the fourth tier of football in the Netherlands, which had its inaugural season as a third tier in 2010–11 and as a fourth tier in 2016–17. The league is placed between the Tweede Divisie and the Vierde Divisie (formerly Hoofdklasse), the third and fifth tiers of Dutch football, respectively. The introduction of the then Topklasse resulted from discussions between the Royal Dutch Football Association, the Coöperatie Eerste Divisie (the clubs in the Eerste Divisie) and the Centraal Overleg Hoofdklassers (the clubs in the Hoofdklasse).

== Background ==
A national football competition in the Netherlands was established in 1956. Prior to that, the districts of the Dutch football association held their own competitions, and the champions of these competitions faced each other for the national title. The highest national division in the new league structure became the Eredivisie, followed by the Eerste Divisie and the Tweede Divisie. The Tweede Divisie was disbanded in 1971; six clubs were promoted to the Eerste Divisie (champions De Volewijckers along with FC Eindhoven, VVV, Fortuna Vlaardingen, PEC and Roda JC), while the remaining ten clubs became amateur clubs. The Eerste Divisie subsequently became the lowest league in professional football in the Netherlands.

The amateur football clubs had a separate league system, the highest league of which was the Eerste Klasse (later: Hoofdklasse). There was no promotion and relegation between professional football and amateur football; a professional football club could only drop to the amateur leagues if its licence for professional football was revoked, while an amateur football club could only be promoted after application and meeting a number of criteria.

The calls for a Topklasse largely stemmed from the professionalization of amateur football clubs in the Netherlands in recent years, in the sense that many Hoofdklasse club players now receive a salary. This has closed the gap between the top of the Hoofdklasse and the bottom of the Eerste Divisie. Chairman of the Dutch football association Henk Kesler had therefore repeatedly called for the creation of the Topklasse to establish promotion and relegation between professional and amateur football, creating a league pyramid akin to the English football league system.

The first plans for a Topklasse were rejected by the Eerste Divisie clubs in 1999.

== Confirmed structure ==
Former Topklasse logo.

The new league structure was approved at an amateur clubs meeting on 6 June 2009. The KNVB introduced the new level for the 2010–11 season, comprising 32 clubs. After the 2009–10 season, the bottom 2 teams in the Eerste Divisie, whose size was reduced from 20 to 18 clubs, and the top four clubs from each of the six Hoofdklasse divisions – a total of 26 clubs – automatically joined the new level. These clubs were joined by six playoff winners from a pool of 12 clubs that finished in 5th or 6th place in their group within the Hoofdklasse.

The 32 clubs within the Topklasse were divided into two leagues comprising 16 clubs. One league was a "Saturday" league and the other a "Sunday" league, a setup that was in place for 14 seasons. At the end of the season, both clubs that finished at the top of their division play each other. The winner of that tie was promoted to the Eerste Divisie, replacing the team that finished 18th. If the winner refused promotion or was ineligible for promotion, the runners-up were promoted. If both teams refused promotion, no promotion and relegation took place between the Eerste Divisie and Topklasse.

In January 2010, the exclusion of bankrupt HFC Haarlem from the Eerste Divisie reduced the number of scheduled relegations to one only, and led the KNVB to announce that this vacancy would be filled by an additional Hoofdklasse club. On 12 May 2010, it was announced that BV Veendam had declared bankruptcy, possibly giving (otherwise relegated) FC Oss a chance to stay in the Eerste Divisie, with the extra slot filled by another Hoofdklasse club. Veendam's bankruptcy was then reversed on appeal, thus confirming FC Oss' relegation into the Topklasse.

After the 2015–16 season promotion to the reintroduced Tweede Divisie, placed between the Eerste Divisie and the Topklasse, renamed Derde Divisie, was implemented. Thus, the Derde Divisie and lower leagues were decremented by one step in the pyramid, with the latter expanding to 36 clubs, 18 in each division. The division winners are promoted and no longer compete for the amateur championship which was made redundant.

The separation between Saturday and Sunday football was abolished in the Derde Divisie before the 2023–24 season. Amateur clubs are asked before the season whether they want to play their home games on Saturday or Sunday. This rule may be deviated from by principled Saturday clubs that retain the right to play on their day.

== Reforms from the 2016–17 season ==
There were several reforms from the 2016–17 season. The league was reformed as follows:

Situation until the 2015–16 season	Situation from the 2016–17 season
The name of the league was Topklasse.	The name of the league is Derde Divisie (English: Third Division)
Promotion to the Eerste Divisie was optional.	Promotion to the Tweede Divisie is mandatory.
There were no reserve teams in the league.	Two reserve teams of professional clubs, determined by a ranking, gained entry.
Situation until the 2019–20 season	Situation from the 2020–21 season
There were two reserve teams.	No more reserve teams in this division; they play in an under-21 or 23 league.

A proposal to split the two divisions determined by region and not by playing date has been rejected.

== Perception among amateur clubs ==
IJsselmeervogels, one of the most successful amateur football clubs in the Netherlands, was a strong opponent of the plans; chief Arian van de Vuurst has stated that "professional football does not fit in with our culture." Because of these objections, promotion to the Eerste Divisie was not mandatory for the champion of the former Topklasse. After 2016, however, promotion to the Tweede Divisie is required.

== Current teams (2025–26) ==
=== A league ===
Club	Location	Venue	Capacity
Rohda Raalte	Raalte	Sportpark Tijenraan	4,500
DOVO	Veenendaal	Sportpark Panhuis	3,200
DVS '33	Ermelo	Sportlaan	5,500
Eemdijk	Bunschoten	Sportpark De Vinken	600
Genemuiden	Genemuiden	Sportpark de Wetering	3,500
Harkemase Boys	Harkema	Sportpark De Bosk	5,000
USV Hercules	Utrecht	Sportpark Voordorp	1,800
Hoogeveen	Hoogeveen	Sportpark Bentinckspark	6,000
HSC '21	Haaksbergen	Groot Scholtenhagen	4,500
VV Scherpenzeel	Rijssen	Sportpark De Breehoek	2,000
SV TEC	Tiel	Sportpark De Lok	2,500
ADO '20	Heemskerk	Sportpark De Vlotter	4,500
Sportlust '46	Woerden	Sportpark Cromwijck	3,500
Sparta Nijkerk	Nijkerk	Sportpark De Ebbenhorst	5,000
Staphorst	Staphorst	Sportpark Het Noorderslag	3,500
Urk	Urk	Sportpark De Vormt	4,500
Excelsior '31	Rijssen	Sportpark De Koerbelt	4,150
SV Huizen	Huizen	Sportpark De Wolfskamer	5,000

=== B league ===
Club	Location	Stadium	Capacity
FC Lisse	Lisse	Sportpark Ter Specke	7,000
UDI '19	Uden	Sportpark Parkzicht	5,000
VV Goes	Goes	Sportpark Het Schenge	1,500
Blauw Geel '38	Veghel	PWA Sportpark	2,500
Gemert	Gemert	Sportpark Molenbroek	4,000
Groene Ster	Heerlerheide	Sportpark Pronsebroek	2,500
RBC Roosendaal	Roosendaal	Atik Stadion	5,000
Kloetinge	Kloetinge	Sportpark Wesselopark	1,000
Meerssen	Meerssen	Sportpark Marsana	1,700
VV Noordwijk	Noordwijk	Sportpark Duinwetering	6,100
VV Zwaluwen	Vlaardingen	Sportpark Zwaluwenlaan	2,750
SVV Scheveningen	The Hague	Sportpark Houtrust	3,500
FC Rijnvogels	Katwijk aan Zee	Sportpark De Kooltuin	1,500
SteDoCo	Hoornaar	Sportpark SteDoCo	1,700
VVSB	Noordwijkerhout	Sportpark De Boekhorst	2,500
TOGB	Berkel en Rodenrijs	Sportpark Het Hoge Land	1,500
VV UNA	Veldhoven	Sportpark Zeelst	2,000
ASWH	Hendrik-Ido-Ambacht	Sportpark Schildman	3,000

== Champions ==
Topklasse
Season	Saturday champions	Sunday champions	Overall champions	Promotion
2010–11	IJsselmeervogels	FC Oss	IJsselmeervogels	FC Oss
2011–12	Spakenburg	Achilles '29	Achilles '29	None
2012–13	Katwijk	Achilles '29	Katwijk	Achilles '29
2013–14	Spakenburg	AFC	Spakenburg	None
2014–15	Kozakken Boys	FC Lienden	FC Lienden	None
2015–16	Excelsior Maassluis	FC Lienden	Excelsior Maassluis	14 clubs

Derde Divisie
Season	Saturday champions	Sunday champions
2016–17	IJsselmeervogels	ASV De Dijk
2017–18	Spakenburg	Jong Vitesse
2018–19	VV Noordwijk	Jong Volendam
2019–20	No champions	
2020–21	No champions	
2021–22	Lisse	OFC
2022–23	ACV	ADO '20
