= HSC '21 =

Dutch football club

- Full name: Haaksbergse Sport Club 1921
- Founded: 1921; 105 years ago
- Ground: Groot Scholtenhagen; Haaksbergen
- Capacity: 4,500
- Chairman: Willy Sticker
- Manager: Eddy Boerhof
- League: Derde Divisie
- 2024–25: Derde Divisie A, 13th of 18
Home colours	Away colours

Haaksbergse Sport Club 1921, known as HSC '21 is a football club from Haaksbergen, Netherlands. The club, was founded in 1921, is currently playing in the Derde Divisie, the second highest tier of amateur football in the Netherlands.

== See also ==
- Category:HSC '21 players
