= Joycelyn =

Joycelyn is a given name. Notable people with the name include:

- Joycelyn Elders (born 1933), American pediatrician, Surgeon General of the United States
- Joycelyn Harrison (born 1964), African-American engineer, Associate Dean at Kent State University
- Joycelyn Ko (born 1986), former Canadian badminton player
- Joycelyn O'Brien, American actress in theater, film and television
- Joycelyn Tetteh (born 1988), Ghanaian Member of Parliament
- Joycelyn Wilson, Assistant Professor at the Georgia Institute of Technology

== See also ==
- Jessalyn
- Jesselyn
- Jocelyn
- Jocelyne
- Josceline
- Joscelyne
- Joslin (disambiguation)
- Joslyn
- Josselin
- Josslyn (disambiguation)
