= Veldhoven en Meerveldhoven =

Coordinates: 51°24′00″N 5°23′30″E

Veldhoven en Meerveldhoven was a municipality in the Dutch province of North Brabant. It was located west of Eindhoven, and covered the village of Veldhoven and the former village Meerveldhoven (now part of Veldhoven).

The municipality existed until 1921, when it merged with Oerle and Zeelst; the new municipality was named simply "Veldhoven".
