= Youri Roulaux =

Dutch footballer

Personal information
- Date of birth: 19 May 1999 (age 27)
- Place of birth: Veldhoven, Netherlands
- Height: 1.79 m (5 ft 10 in)
- Position: Goalkeeper

Team information
- Current team: SV Valkenswaard

Youth career
- RKVV Waalre
- –2013: UNA
- 2013–2017: PSV

Senior career*
Years	Team	Apps	(Gls)
2017–2020	Jong PSV	22	(0)
2020–2021	Roda JC Kerkrade	5	(0)
2021	Jong PSV	1	(0)
2022–	SV Valkenswaard		
- * Club domestic league appearances and goals as of 15:58, 1 October 2021 (UTC)

Youri Roulaux (born 19 May 1999) is a Dutch footballer who plays for SV Valkenswaard as a goalkeeper.

== Career ==
He signed for Roda JC Kerkrade on 1 September 2020. After one season, he rejoined Jong PSV, where he would also become a goalkeepers coach in the youth department.
