= Josceline =

Josceline is a given name. Notable people with the name include:

- Josceline Amherst (1846–1900), member of Western Australia's first Legislative Council under responsible government
- Josceline Bagot (1854–1913), English British Army officer and Conservative politician
- Josceline de Bohon (1111–1184), Norman religious leader
- Josceline Percy (Royal Navy officer) (1784–1856), Royal Navy officer who went on to be Commander-in-Chief
- Josceline Percy, 11th Earl of Northumberland (1644–1670), of Alnwick Castle, Northumberland and Petworth House, Sussex, an English peer
- Lord Josceline Percy (1811–1881), British Conservative politician
- Josceline Wodehouse GCB CMG (1852–1930), senior British Army officer

== See also ==
- Joceline (name)
- Joslin (disambiguation)
