= Rob van Boekel =

Dutch footballer

Personal information
- Full name: Rob van Boekel
- Date of birth: 22 February 1987 (age 39)
- Place of birth: Veldhoven, Netherlands
- Height: 1.85 m (6 ft 1 in)
- Position: Attacking midfielder

Youth career
- UNA
- 1997–2008: PSV

Senior career*
Years	Team	Apps	(Gls)
2008–2013	Eindhoven	147	(20)
2013–2023	UNA	150	(32)
- * Club domestic league appearances and goals as of 11:51, 22 August 2021 (UTC)

Rob van Boekel (born 22 February 1987) is a Dutch retired footballer who played as an attacking midfielder.

== Club career ==
Van Boekel started playing football for local amateur side UNA and joined the PSV academy in 1997. After failing to break into their senior squad, he moved to local rivals FC Eindhoven in 2008.

He returned to UNA in 2013 and played his final game in June 2023.
