= Ounaies =

Ounaies is a Tunisian surname. Notable people with the name include:

- Ahmed Ounaies (born 1936), Tunisian politician and diplomat
- Zoubeida Ounaies, Tunisian-American materials scientist
