= Harrie Gommans =

Dutch footballer (born 1983)

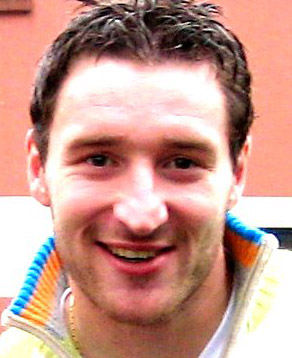

Personal information
- Date of birth: 20 February 1983 (age 43)
- Place of birth: Roermond, Netherlands
- Height: 1.90 m (6 ft 3 in)
- Position: Striker

Senior career*
Years	Team	Apps	(Gls)
2000–2004	Fortuna Sittard	57	(11)
2004–2005	Excelsior	26	(4)
2005	Westerlo	5	(0)
2005–2007	MVV	73	(33)
2007–2008	Vitesse	27	(7)
2008–2010	Roda JC	7	(0)
2009	→ Roeselare (loan)	2	(0)
2010	→ Fortuna Sittard (loan)	13	(3)
2010–2011	Waasland-Beveren	21	(6)
2011–2012	Fortuna Sittard	22	(9)
2012–2013	De Graafschap	7	(1)
Total		260	(74)

Managerial career
- 2015–2017: MMC Weert (player-manager)
- 2018–2019: EVV (assistant)
- 2020–2024: UNA
- 2024–: Wittenhorst
- * Club domestic league appearances and goals

Harrie Gommans (born 20 February 1983) is a Dutch reired footballer who played as a striker.

== Playing career ==
Born in Roermond, Gommans began his senior career during the 2000–01 season with Fortuna Sittard, and has also played for Excelsior, Westerlo, MVV, Vitesse, Roda JC and Roeselare. He had a third spell in Belgium with Waasland-Beveren and moved to De Graafschap in 2012.

== Coaching career ==
Gommans, who lives in Buggenum, was named head coach at UNA of Zeelst, in January 2020. In 2024 he took charge at RKSV Wittenhorst.
