= VV UNA =

Dutch football club

UNA
- Full name: Voetbalvereniging Uitspanning Na Arbeid
- Founded: 1929; 97 years ago
- Ground: Sportpark Zeelst; Zeelst, Veldhoven, Netherlands
- Capacity: 2,000
- Chairman: Peter Smetsers
- Manager: Jurriaan van Poelje
- League: Derde Divisie
- 2025–26: Derde Divisie B, 12th of 18
Home colours

Voetbalvereniging UNA ("Uitspanning Na Arbeid") is a football club from Zeelst, Netherlands. It plays at the 2,000-capacity Hoofdveld at Sportpark Zeelst.

Founded on 7 November 1929, the club currently competes in the Derde Divisie, the fourth tier of football in the Netherlands, after being relegated from the Tweede Divisie in 2017.

== Honours ==
League
League	Amount	Years
Championships
Hoofdklasse Sunday	2×	2011, 2013
Eerste Klasse Sunday	2×	1965, 1976
Tweede Klasse Sunday	1×	1974
Derde Klasse Sunday	3×	1963, 1990, 1993
Vierde Klasse Sunday	2×	1948, 1953
Promotion
Promotion to Tweede Divisie	1x	2016
Promotion after play-offs
Promotion to Hoofdklasse	2×	1981, 2000
Promotion to Eerste Klasse	2×	1964, 1999

== Chief coach ==
- 2020–2024: Harrie Gommans
- 2024–present: Jurriaan van Poelje
