= Henrieke Goorhuis =

Dutch cartoonist (born 1990)

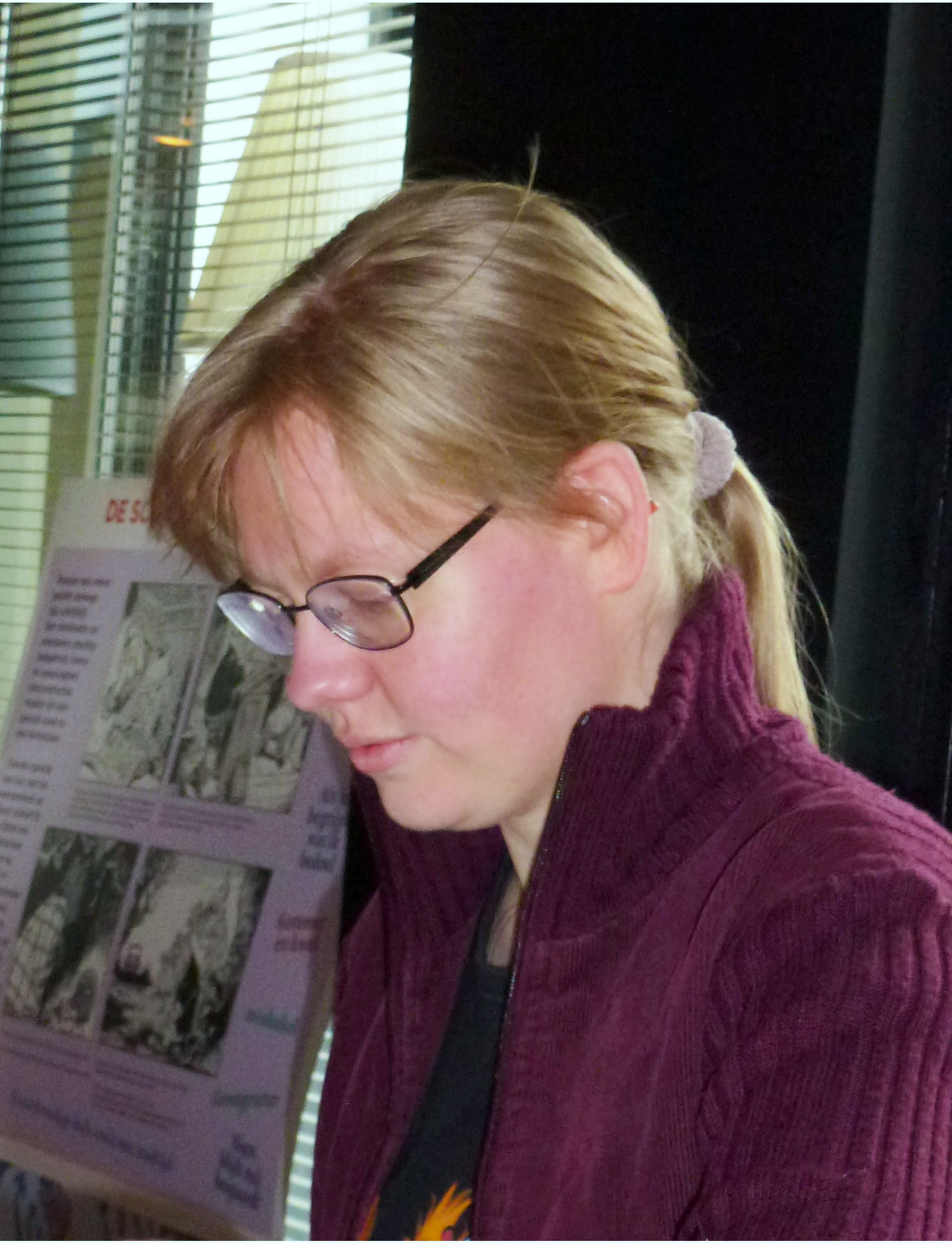
- Goorhuis in 2017
- Born: 1990 (age 35–36) Veldhoven, Netherlands
- Area: Comics artist
- Notable works: Het lastpak
- Awards: Veldhoven Culture Prize

Henrieke Goorhuis is a Dutch cartoonist and illustrator. She is known for illustrating Het lastpak, a story featuring the characters Oliver B. Bumble and Tom Puss.
