= Hendricus Stoof =

Dutch physicist

Hendricus Theodorus Christiaan (Henk) Stoof
- Born: 21 October 1962 (age 64); Veldhoven, Netherlands
- Education: Eindhoven University
- Awards: NWO VICI (2003)
- Scientific career
- Fields: Theoretical physics, atomic physics, many-body physics, condensed matter physics
- Workplaces: Utrecht University
- Doctoral advisor: B.J. Verhaar and W. Glöckle

Hendricus Theodorus Christiaan "Henk" Stoof (born 1962) is a professor in theoretical physics at Utrecht University in the Netherlands. His main interests are atomic physics, condensed matter physics and many-body physics. He is a Fellow of the American Physical Society.

During the last ten years, the group of H.T.C. Stoof has been involved in the study of various aspects of the physics of ultracold atomic gases. In addition, they performed research on skyrmion lattices in the quantum Hall effect and collective modes in supersolid 4He. Below the results obtained from the study of degenerate Fermi gases are briefly summarized.

As early as 1996, they predicted that an atomic gas of ^{6}Li (a fermionic isotope of lithium) would become a Bardeen–Cooper–Schrieffer (BCS) superfluid at experimentally attainable temperatures. They also performed a detailed study of the superfluid behavior of this gas below the critical temperature. Motivated by this work, at least six experimental groups around the world, including those led by R. Grimm, R. G. Hulet, D. S. Jin, and W. Ketterle, began trying to achieve the conditions necessary for the BCS transition in ^{6}Li.

Over the last seven years, the study of superfluidity in Fermi gases has been a focus of the ultracold-atoms community. The experiments that led to the creation of a superconductor with the highest critical temperature achieved, as a fraction of the Fermi energy, were made possible through the use of so-called Feshbach resonances. These resonances were theoretically co-discovered in alkalis by H. T. C. Stoof in 1993.

At that time, the full potential of Feshbach resonances for studying the crossover from a BCS superconductor of Cooper pairs to a Bose–Einstein condensate (BEC) of molecules had not yet been realized. This crossover is now well understood, however, owing to the strong connection between experiment and ab initio theory that is possible in this field. The group has made important contributions to our current understanding of how many-body physics affects the BEC–BCS crossover and of how the two-body physics of the Feshbach resonance can be incorporated exactly into many-body theory. Henk Stoof was elected an APS Fellow for these contributions.

Over the last three years, the group of R. G. Hulet at Rice University and the group of W. Ketterle at MIT have studied the spin imbalance on the superfluid state. These experiments have focused on the strongly interacting, or unitarity, limit, exactly at resonance, where the attraction between the atoms is as strong as quantum mechanics allows. The group of H. T. C. Stoof has also made contributions to this topic. For example, they were the first to predict the topology of the universal phase diagram of this unitarity gas, which has now been confirmed experimentally and contains a tricritical temperature below which the gas phase-separates into an (almost) equal-density superfluid and a polarized normal gas. Using renormalization-group techniques, they remain the only theoretical group to have accurately calculated this strong-coupling tricritical temperature from first principles. They believe that an important reason for their success in this area of physics is their background in both microscopic atomic physics and macroscopic condensed-matter physics. Only by combining knowledge from these two fields can one develop many-body theories that can be compared directly with experiment without any fitting parameters.
