= Joceline (name) =

Joceline is a unisex given name. Notable people with the name include:

== Feminine use ==
- Joceline Clemencia (1952–2011), Afro-Curaçaoan writer and linguist
- Joceline Lega, French applied mathematician
- Joceline Monteiro (born 1990), Portuguese athlete
- Joceline Sanschagrin (born 1950), Canadian writer
- Joceline Schriemer, Canadian politician

== Male use ==
- Joceline of Furness (fl. 1175–1214), English Cistercian hagiographer
- Jocelin of Wells (died 1242), Bishop of Bath

== See also ==
- Josceline Percy, 11th Earl of Northumberland (1644–1670), English peer
