= Joycelyn Harrison =

African-American engineer

Joycelyn S. Harrison
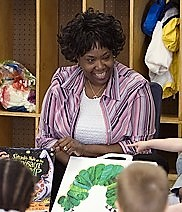
- Harrison reads to children at NASA Langley's Child Development Center in 2007
- Born: Joycelyn Ovetta Simpson; January 22, 1964 (age 62); Chattanooga, Tennessee
- Education: Georgia Tech; Spelman College
- Scientific career
- Workplaces: Kent State University; Langley Research Center
- Thesis: Modeling viscosity and ionic conductivity of epoxy resins using free volume concepts (1989)

Joycelyn Harrison (born January 22, 1964) is an African-American engineer who is Associate Dean of the College of Aeronautics and Engineering at Kent State University. In 2006 she was awarded the NASA Outstanding Leadership Medal. Her research considers the development of novel piezoelectric materials.

== Early life and education ==
Harrison was born in Chattanooga, Tennessee. Her first job was washing people's hair in her mother's beauty salon. She attended North Chattanooga Junior High School where her teacher, Stu Silvernman, encouraged her to pursue a career in chemical engineering. She joined Spelman College as an undergraduate student, where she majored in chemical engineering. After earning her bachelor's degree, Harrison moved to Georgia Tech.

== Research and career ==
In 1994, Harrison joined the NASA Langley Research Center as a research engineer. At Langley she worked alongside Terry L. St. Clair on piezoelectric materials and electro-active polymers. By 1999 Harrison had been promoted to the Advanced Materials and Processing Branch.

Harrison worked on Thin-Layer Composite-Unimorph Piezoelectric Driver and Sensor, THUNDER, a novel device that can detect changes in responsive smart materials. In particular, THUNDER could be applied to electronic systems, optical components and anywhere that needs noise or jitter suppression. THUNDER was awarded the Advantage Business Media R&D 100 Award. THUNDER was part of the NASA morphing programme, which looked to allow remote shaping of the surface of satellites.

In 2009 Harrison joined the Air Force Research Laboratory, where she worked on the low density materials programme. She was eventually made Director of the Budget Plans, and oversaw the United States Air Force $500 million research portfolio. Harrison joined Kent State University as Associate Dean for Research in the College of Aeronautics and Engineering.

== Awards and honours ==
- 1998 National Women in Color Technology All-Star Award
- 2000 Exceptional Achievement Medal
- 2006 NASA Outstanding Leadership Medal
- 2020 Dominion Energy and Library of Virginia "Strong Men and Women" in Virginia History honouree

== Select publications ==
- Ounaies, Z.; Park, C.; Wise, K. E.; Siochi, E. J.; Harrison, J. S. (2003-08-01). "Electrical properties of single wall carbon nanotube reinforced polyimide composites". Composites Science and Technology. Modeling and Characterization of Nanostructured Materials. 63 (11): 1637–1646. doi:10.1016/S0266-3538(03)00067-8. ISSN 0266-3538.
- Harrison, J. S.; Ounaies, Z. (2002). Piezoelectric Polymers. American Cancer Society. doi:10.1002/0471440264.pst427. ISBN 978-0-471-44026-0. S2CID 4648890.
- Park, Cheol; Ounaies, Zoubeida; Watson, Kent A; Crooks, Roy E; Smith, Joseph; Lowther, Sharon E; Connell, John W; Siochi, Emilie J; Harrison, Joycelyn S; Clair, Terry L. St (2002-10-04). "Dispersion of single wall carbon nanotubes by in situ polymerization under sonication". Chemical Physics Letters. 364 (3): 303–308. Bibcode:2002CPL...364..303P. doi:10.1016/S0009-2614(02)01326-X. ISSN 0009-2614.
