= Heikant, Veldhoven =

Coordinates: 51°25′35″N 5°23′33″E

Heikant
- Neighbourhood
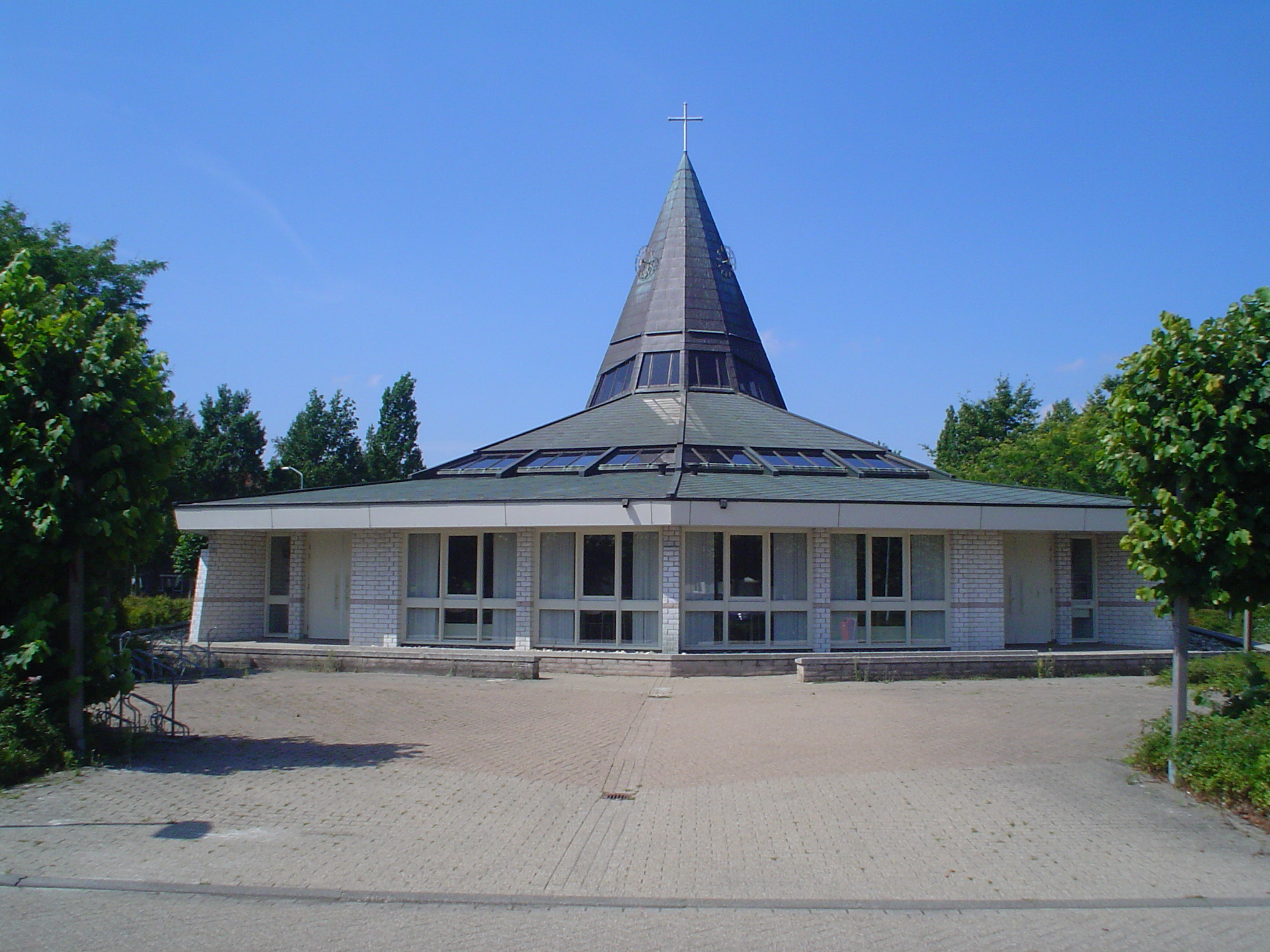
- The Sint-Maartenchurch in Heikant
- Interactive map of Heikant
- Country: Netherlands
- Province: North Brabant
- Municipality: Veldhoven

Area
  - Total: 1.33 km^{2} (0.51 sq mi)
  - Land: 1.33 km^{2} (0.51 sq mi)
  - Water: 0 km^{2} (0 sq mi)
- Time zone: UTC+1 (CET)
- Area code: 040

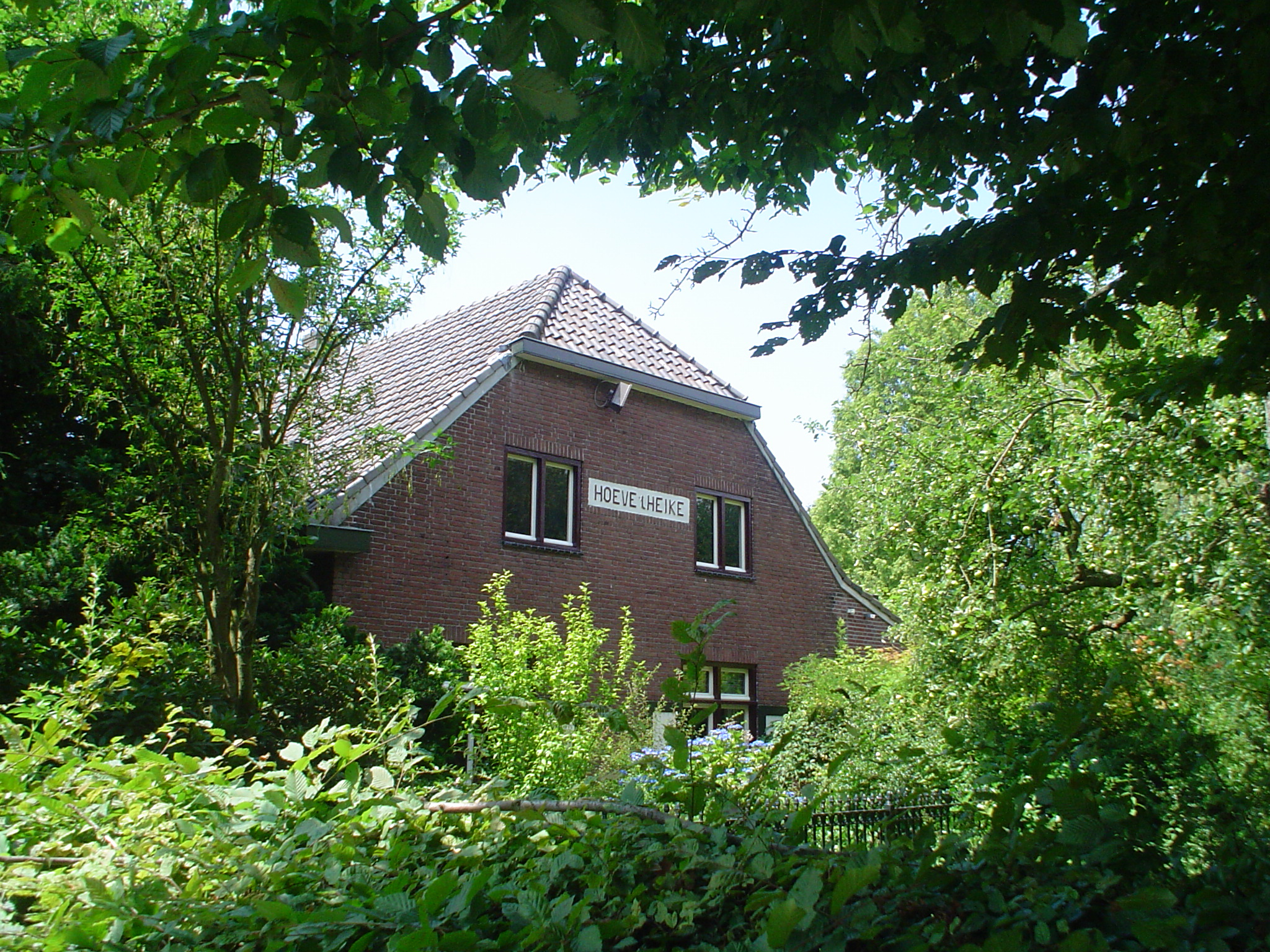
Hoeve 't Heike, built in 1935, was one of the farmhouses that were integrated into the neighbourhood in 1985

Heikant is a neighbourhood in the municipality of Veldhoven, in the Dutch province of North Brabant. With a population of over 6700 inhabitants, it is the largest neighbourhood in Veldhoven. Heikant contains a small shopping centre and a church. The Sint-Maartenchurch was built in 1990.

Heikant was constructed between 1979 and 1989. The first houses were officially completed on February 21, 1980. A substantial part of the former hamlet Het Heike had to be demolished to make room for the new neighbourhood. Seven farmhouses were demolished in 1985. One of them was the farmhouse Clarissenhoef, which originated from the 14th century. Five farmhouses of the hamlet Het Heike remained and were integrated into the new neighbourhood.
