= Willem Adams =

Dutch painter (1937–2022)

Willem Adams (22 February 1937 – 5 January 2022) was a Dutch painter. His work can be found in the Museum Kempenland and Van Abbemuseum in Eindhoven, the Stedelijk Museum Amsterdam in Amsterdam, the Museum Het Valkhof in Nijmegen, and the Noordbrabants Museum in 's-Hertogenbosch. Adams was born in Meerveldhoven on 22 February 1937. He died in Eindhoven on 5 January 2022, at the age of 84.
