= Ingrid Teeuwen =

Dutch weightlifter

Personal information
- Born: 30 March 1981 (age 45) Veldhoven
- Height: 1.68 m (5 ft 6 in)
- Weight: 53 kg (117 lb) - 63 kg (139 lb)

Sport
- Country: Netherlands
- Sport: Olympic weightlifting
- Coached by: Frans Geerlings
Medal record
Women's Olympic weightlifting
Representing Netherlands
Gold medal – first place	Thor Cup 2008	– 58 kg

Ingrid Teeuwen (born 1981) is a female Dutch Olympic Elite Weightlifter. She competed in the Women's Senior -53 kg to -63 kg categories.

== Sporting career ==
Teeuwen was training as a gymnast when it was suggested she take up weightlifting to help her become stronger. Teeuwen started lifting in 2003, becoming Dutch champion at her very first weightlifting competition. She remained to claim the gold at the Dutch Senior Championships until 2010.

Teeuwen medaled at many international competitions. She also was a member of the women's team of SAK, a weightlifting club in Stockholm. They became 4th at the Swedish Team Championships in 2008.

She joined the Dutch national squad in 2003 and has represented The Netherlands on many occasions, the biggest events being the World Cup in Reykjavik in 2008, the University World Championships in 2005, 2006 and 2008 and the Senior European Championships in 2009.

During the University World Championships in 2005 she became 7th in de -58 kg, which was the best result for a Dutch weightlifter in history. In 2006, she became 10th in the -53 kg. In 2008, she became 6th in the -58 kg, and once more achieved the best result for the best Dutch weightlifter in history. She claimed the gold at the World Cup Reykyavik in 2008. At the Senior European Championships in 2009 she became 14th.

== National records ==
From 2007 until 2014 Teeuwen held the Dutch national weightlifting records of snatch and the total in the Women's Senior -53 kg category.

Category	Snatch	Total	
-53 kg	47 kg	57 kg	104 kg
