= Joslyn =

Joslyn is a surname. Notable people with the surname include:

- Allyn Joslyn (1901–1981), American stage, film and television actor
- Betsy Joslyn (born 1954), Broadway musical and dramatic actress and soprano
- Cliff Joslyn (born 1963), American information systems scientist
- Frank Joslyn Baum (1883–1958), lawyer, soldier, writer, and film producer
- Hezekiah Joslyn (died 1865), American abolitionist
- Joslyn Hoyte-Smith (born 1954), former British 400m athlete
- Lewis Joslyn, American politician
- Marcellus L. Joslyn (1873–1963), founder of the Joslyn Manufacturing and Supply Company, a Chicago, Illinois electrical supply firm
- Matilda Joslyn Gage (1826–1898), suffragist, Native American activist, abolitionist, freethinker, and prolific author
- Maynard A. Joslyn (1904–1984), Russian-born American food scientist in the rebirth of the California wine industry after 1933
- Patrick Allen Joslyn (born 1986), American drag queen known as Joslyn Fox
- Steve Joslyn, American college baseball coach

== See also ==
- Joslyn Musey, protagonist of the novel Warchild

== See also ==
- Joslyn Art Museum, the principal fine arts museum in the state of Nebraska, United States of America
- Joslyn Castle, folly located at 3902 Davenport Street in the District of Omaha, Nebraska, USA
- Jocelyn
- Joslin (disambiguation)
- Josselin Castle
