= Jocelyne =

Jocelyne is a feminine given name. Notable people with the name include:

- Jocelyne (singer), (1951–1972), a French singer of the Yé-yé period
- Jocelyne Bloch, Swiss neurosurgeon
- Jocelyne Boisseau, French film and television actress
- Jocelyne Couture-Nowak (1958–2007), Canadian victim of the Virginia Tech shootings
- Jocelyne Dakhlia (born 1959), French historian and anthropologist
- Jocelyne Gagné, Canadian Federal Court justice
- Jocelyne Jocya (1942–2003), French singer and children's rights advocate
- Jocelyne LaGarde (1924–1979), Tahitian actor
- Jocelyne Larocque (born 1988), Canadian ice hockey player
- Jocelyne Loewen (born 1976), Canadian voice actress
- Jocelyne Pérard (born 1940), French geographer
- Jocelyne Roy-Vienneau (c. 1956–2019), 31st Lieutenant Governor of New Brunswick
