= Josslyn =

Josslyn may refer to:

- Josslyn Hay, 22nd Earl of Erroll (1901-1941) British peer
- Josslyn Francis Pennington, 5th Baron Muncaster (1834-1917) British politician
- Josslyn Island Site, archaeological site composed of a shell mound in Lee County, Florida
- "Josslyn", a 2020 song by American singer-songwriter Olivia O'Brien
