= Jessalyn =

Jessalyn is a feminine given name. Notable people with the name include:

- Jessalyn Gilsig (born 1971), Canadian actress
- Jessalyn Van Trump (1887–1939), American actress
- Jessalyn Wanlim (born 1982), Canadian actress and model
