= Veldhoven =

- Municipality
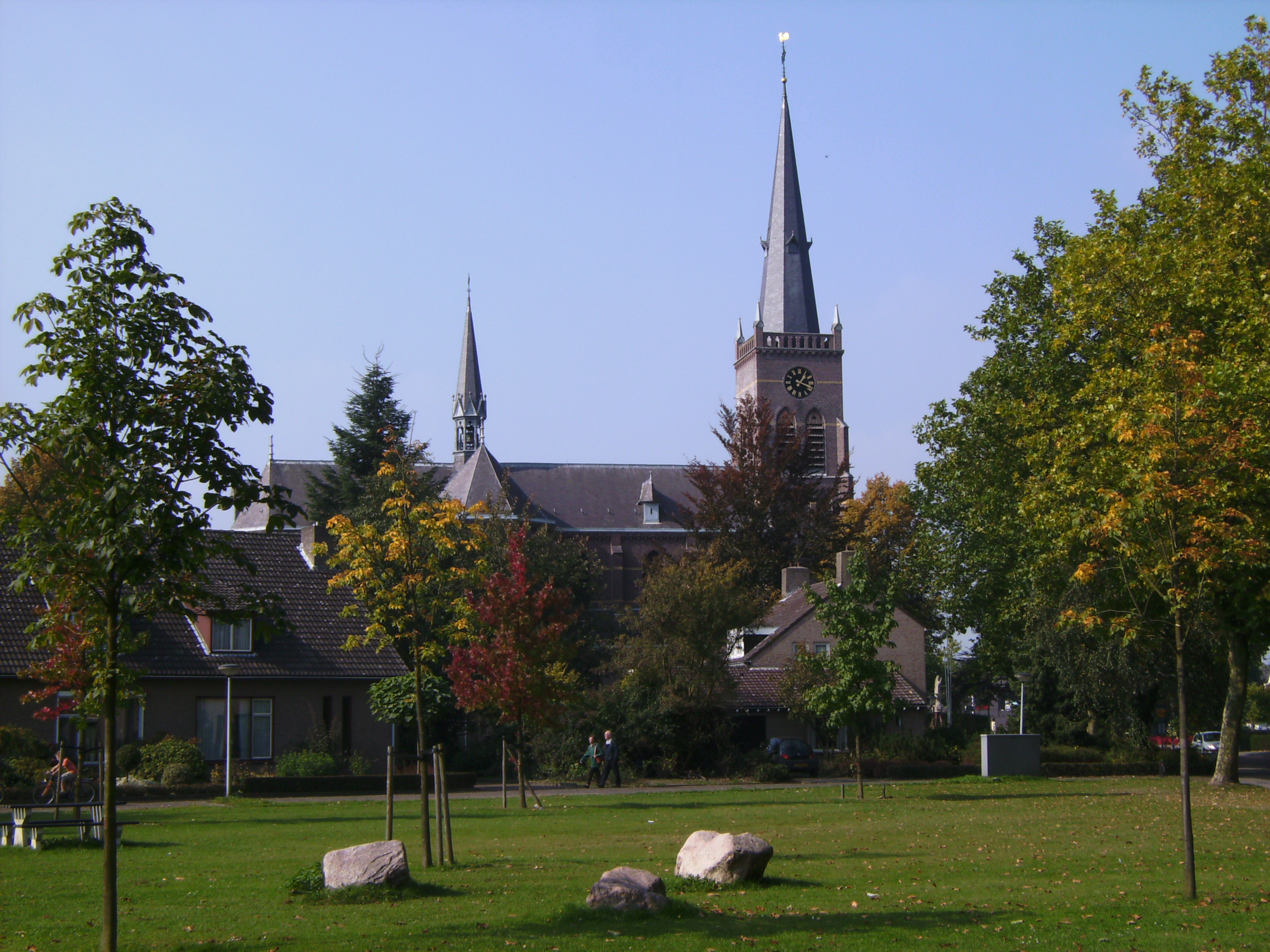
- Church in Veldhoven

- Flag Coat of arms

- Location in North Brabant
- Coordinates: 51°25′12″N 05°24′18″E
- Country: Netherlands
- Province: North Brabant

Government
  - Body: Municipal council
  - Mayor: Marcel Delhez (VVD)

Area
  - Total: 31.89 km^{2} (12.31 sq mi)
  - Land: 31.69 km^{2} (12.24 sq mi)
  - Water: 0.20 km^{2} (0.077 sq mi)
- Elevation: 22 m (72 ft)

Population (January 2021)
  - Total: 45,500
  - Density: 1,436/km^{2} (3,720/sq mi)
- Demonym: Veldhovenaar
- Time zone: UTC+1 (CET)
  - Summer (DST): UTC+2 (CEST)
- Postcode: 5500–5509
- Area code: 040
- Website: www.veldhoven.nl

Veldhoven (Dutch pronunciation: [ˈvɛltˌɦoːvə(n)]) is a municipality and town on the Gender in the southern Netherlands, just southwest of Eindhoven, in the province of North Brabant.

== Topography ==
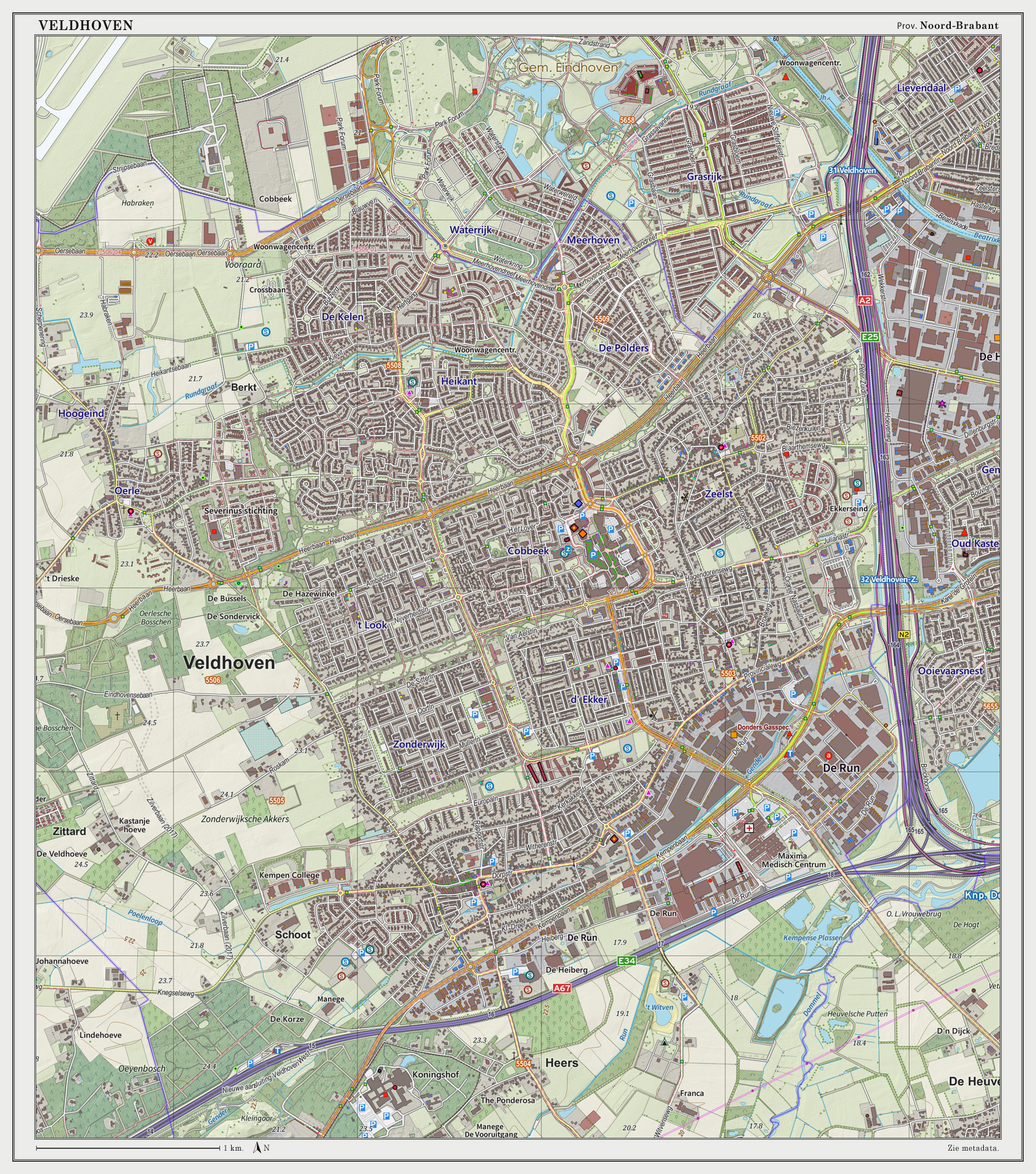
Map of Veldhoven (town), Dec. 2013

== Population centres ==
The modern town of Veldhoven is an agglomeration of former rural villages that in the twentieth century grew together to form one large suburban area catering to Eindhoven commuter needs. The villages are: Veldhoven proper to the southwest; Meerveldhoven to the southeast; Oerle to the west; and Zeelst to the northeast. A new city center was constructed between Zeelst and Veldhoven.

== Economy ==
Veldhoven is home to the headquarters of the manufacturer of high-tech (semiconductor) lithography equipment ASML. As of 2009, the company employed over 14,000 people—equivalent to nearly one eighth of the town's population. ASML occupies the tallest building (83 meters) in Veldhoven. The municipality features a large industrial and office area along the Gender, which also includes the second-largest hospital in the Eindhoven urban region, Máxima Medisch Centrum.

== Veldhoven Centrum ==
Veldhoven Centrum has over 100 shops with famous brands covering restaurants, groceries, fashion products, jewelry and banks, and a market every Monday for fruit and produce. It also has services such as a library and municipal and VVV offices, as well as housing its political center.

== Culture ==
The yearly festival Cult en Tumult offers a varied program of art and culture in the broadest sense. Theatre De Schalm is near the City Centrum.

The spoken language is Kempenlands (an East Brabantian dialect, which is very similar to colloquial Dutch).

== Town council ==
The current town council of Veldhoven was elected at the 2026 local elections.

Council seats
Party	2006	2010	2014	2018	2022	2026
Hart voor Veldhoven	0	0	0	0	9	9
Gemeente Belangen Veldhoven	4	5	6	6	6	5
VVD	4	5	5	7	5	4
D66	0	2	3	2	2	3
PvdA (2022 & 2026 with GroenLinks)	6	3	2	2	3	3
Senioren Veldhoven	0	0	0	5	2	2
CDA	5	4	4	2	2	2
SP	0	0	0	0	0	1
Veldhoven Samen Anders	8	7	6	3	0	0
Samenwerkend Veldhoven	0	1	1	0	0	0
Total	27	27	27	27	29	29

== Transport ==
Eindhoven Airport is near Veldhoven, on the border with Eindhoven in Meerhoven, close to the A2 and A67 motorways.

== Notable people ==
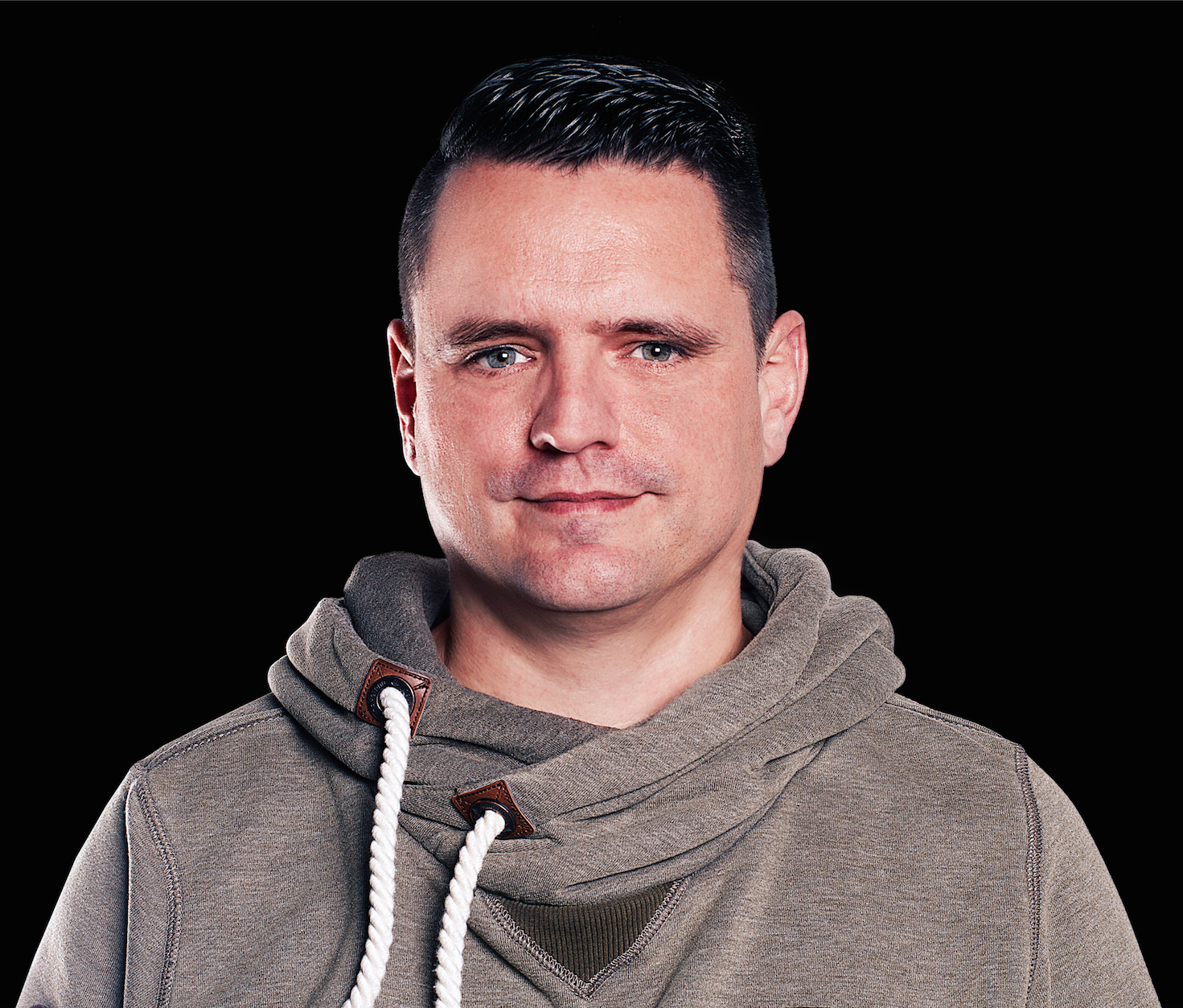
DJ Zany, 2014

- Willem Adams (1937 in Veldhoven–2022) a Dutch painter
- Jan Cornelius van Sambeek (1886 in Veldhoven–1966 in Kabanga) a Dutch White Fathers missionary in Tanganyika
- Marius van Amelsvoort (1930–2006 in Veldhoven) a Dutch politician and diplomat
- Hendricus Stoof (born 1962 in Veldhoven) a professor of theoretical physics at Utrecht University
- Henrieke Goorhuis (born 1990 in Veldhoven) a Dutch cartoonist and illustrator
- Raoul van Grinsven (born 1974) stage name DJ Zany, a disc jockey, owns Fusion Records, lives in Veldhoven
- Anita Groener (born 1958 in Veldhoven) a Dutch artist
- Mau Heymans (born 1961 in Veldhoven) a Dutch Disney comics artist and writer
- Jessy Seuntiens (born 1980 in Oerle) stage name Jesselyn, is a Dutch DJ
- Daan de Kort (born 1992 in Veldhoven) a Dutch politician
- Tiny Kox (born 1951 in Veldhoven) a Dutch politician
- Teun Luijkx (born 1986 in Veldhoven) a Dutch actor
- Maartje Verhoef (born 1997 in Veldhoven) a Dutch fashion model

=== Sport ===
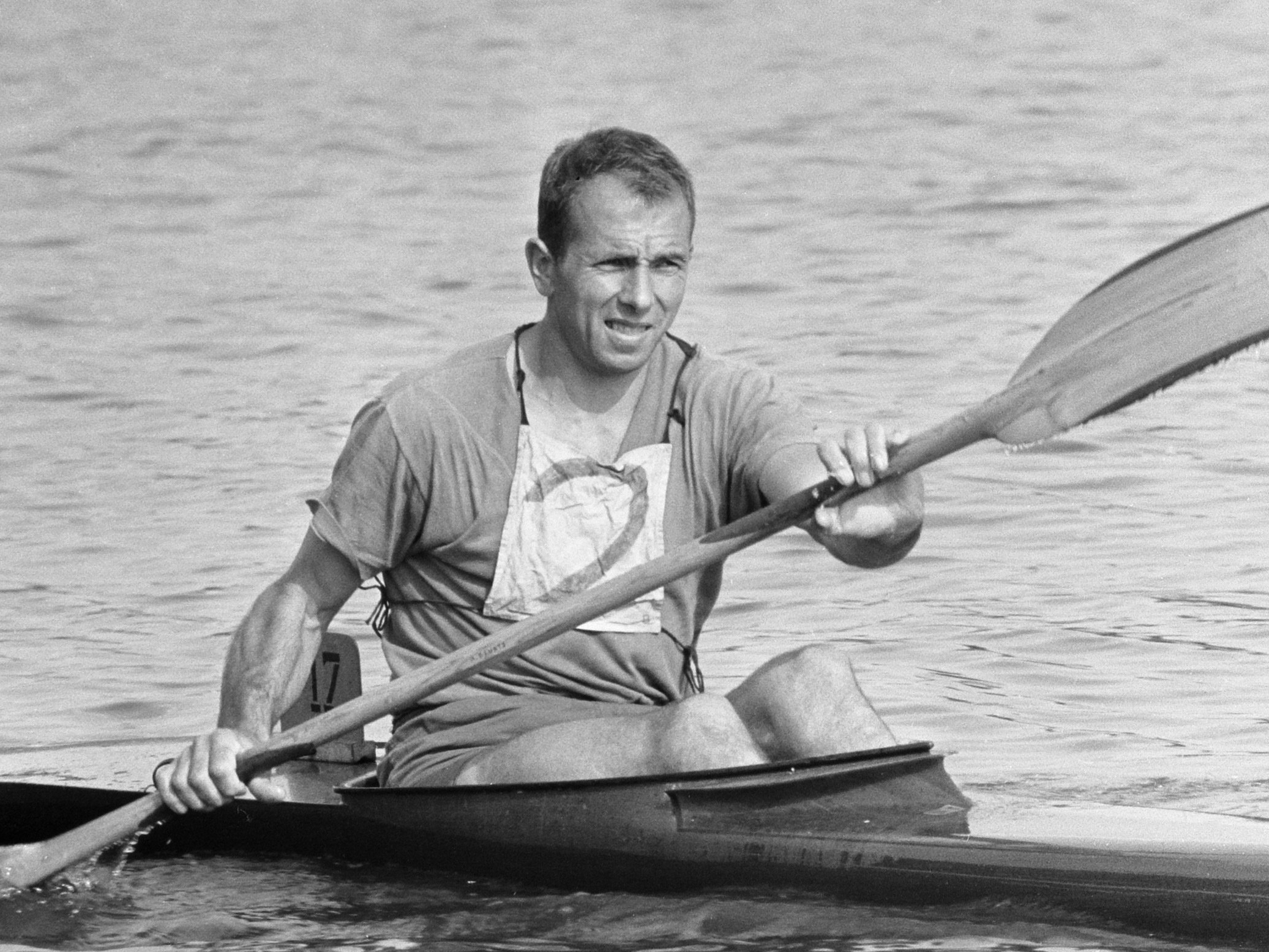
Anton Geurts, 1968

- John van den Akker (born 1966 in Veldhoven) a Dutch former cyclist
- Rob van Boekel (born 1987 in Veldhoven) a Dutch footballer
- Kayleigh van Dooren (born 1987 in Veldhoven) a Dutch footballer
- Gerard Egelmeers (born 1999 in Veldhoven) a former Olympic rower
- Toon Geurts (1932 in Veldhoven – 2017) a Dutch sprint canoer, silver medallist at the 1964 Summer Olympics
- Ingrid Teeuwen (born 1981 in Veldhoven) a Dutch weightlifter
- Eelco Horsten (born 1989 in Veldhoven) a Dutch footballer
- Maud Kaptheijns (born 1994 in Veldhoven) a Dutch cyclist
- Corné van Kessel (born 1991 in Veldhoven) a Dutch professional cyclo-cross and road cyclist
- Paco van Moorsel (born 1989 in Veldhoven) a Dutch footballer with 280 club caps
- Milou van der Heijden (born 1990 in Veldhoven) a professional squash player
- Janus van Kasteren (born 1986 in Veldhoven), Dutch rally raid driver, winner of the 2023 Dakar Rally in the Truck class

== Gallery ==
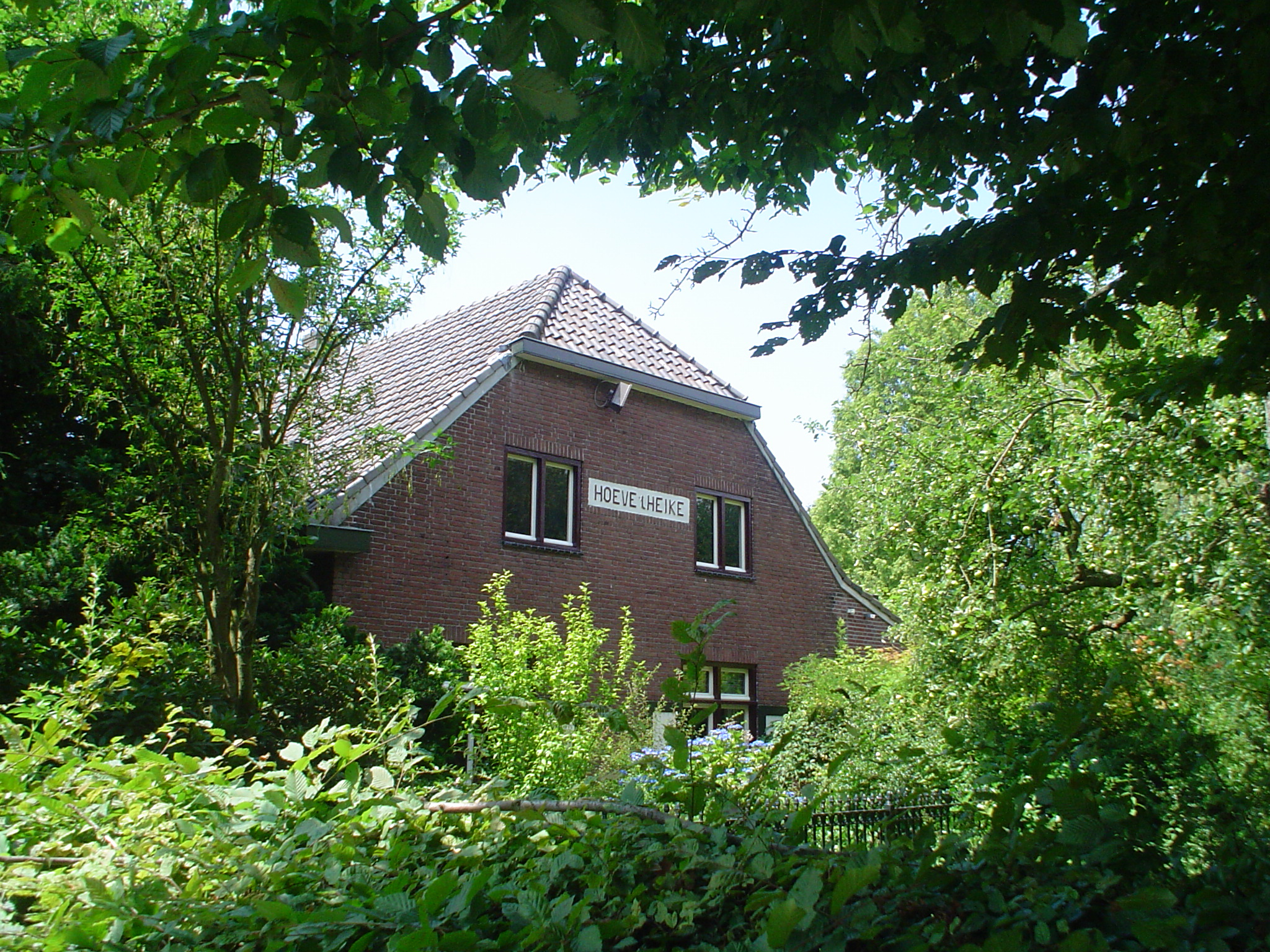
Hoeve 't Heike - Veldhoven

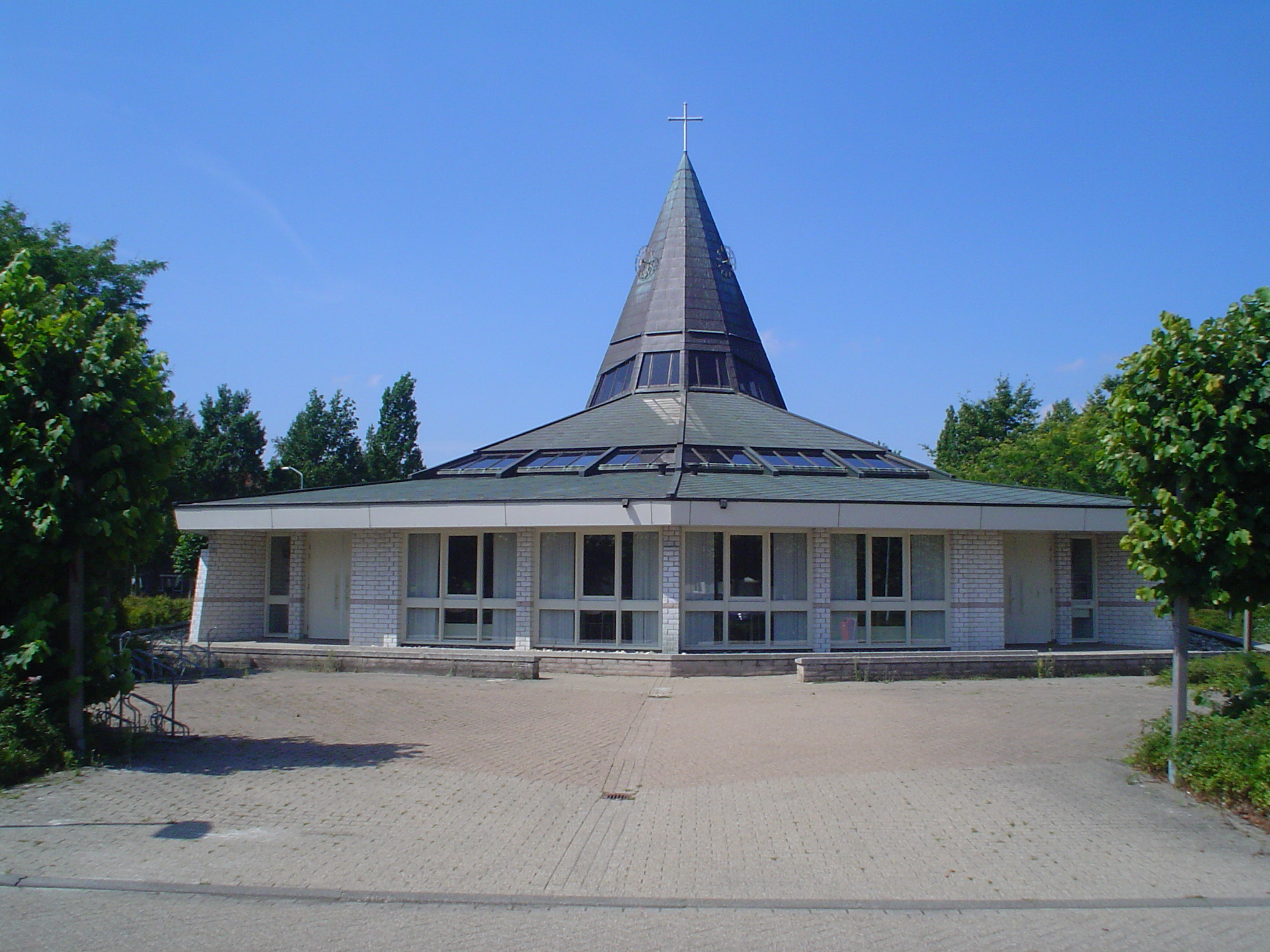
Former Sint Maartenkerk - Veldhoven

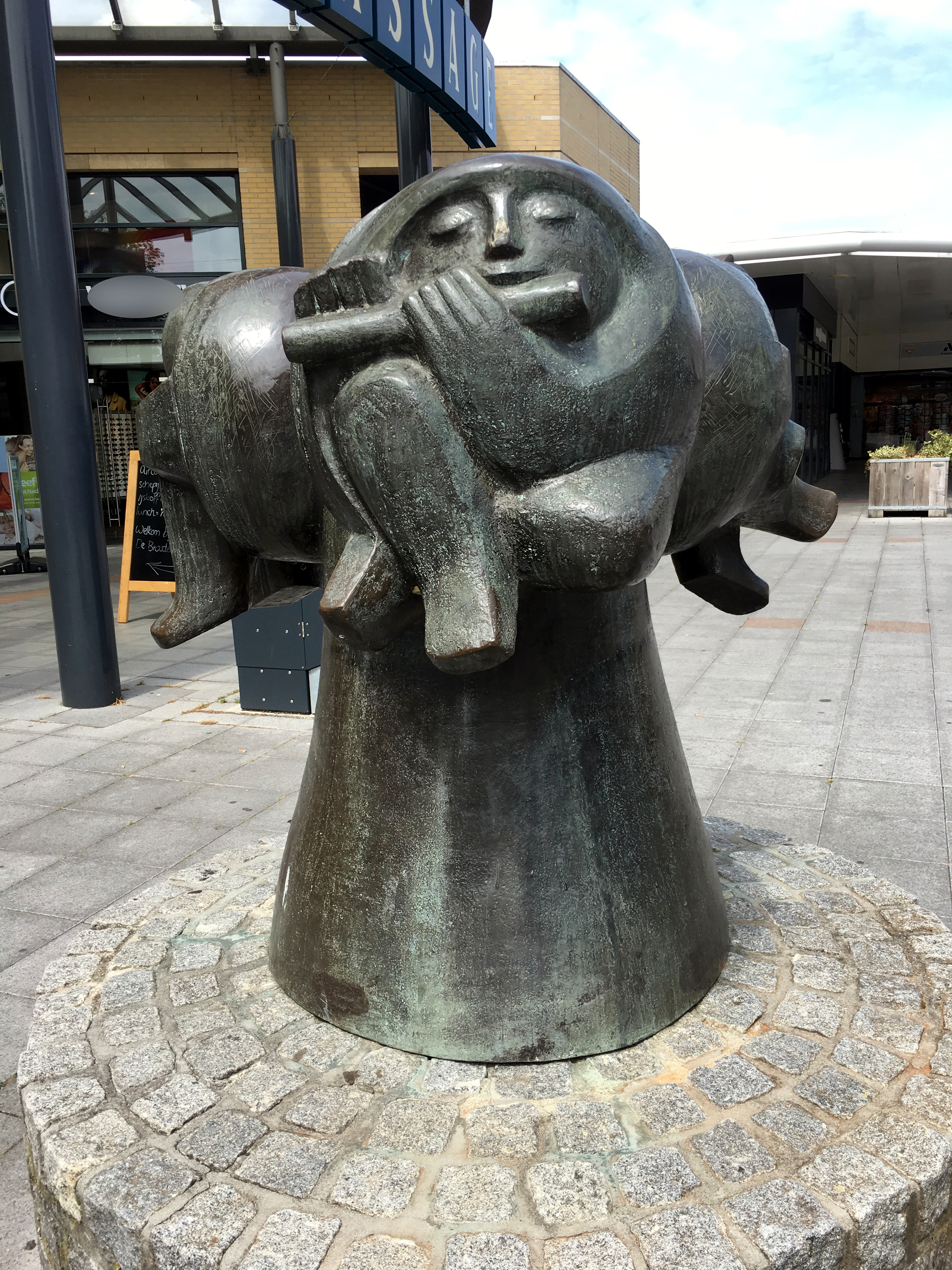
Three Musicians - Veldhoven

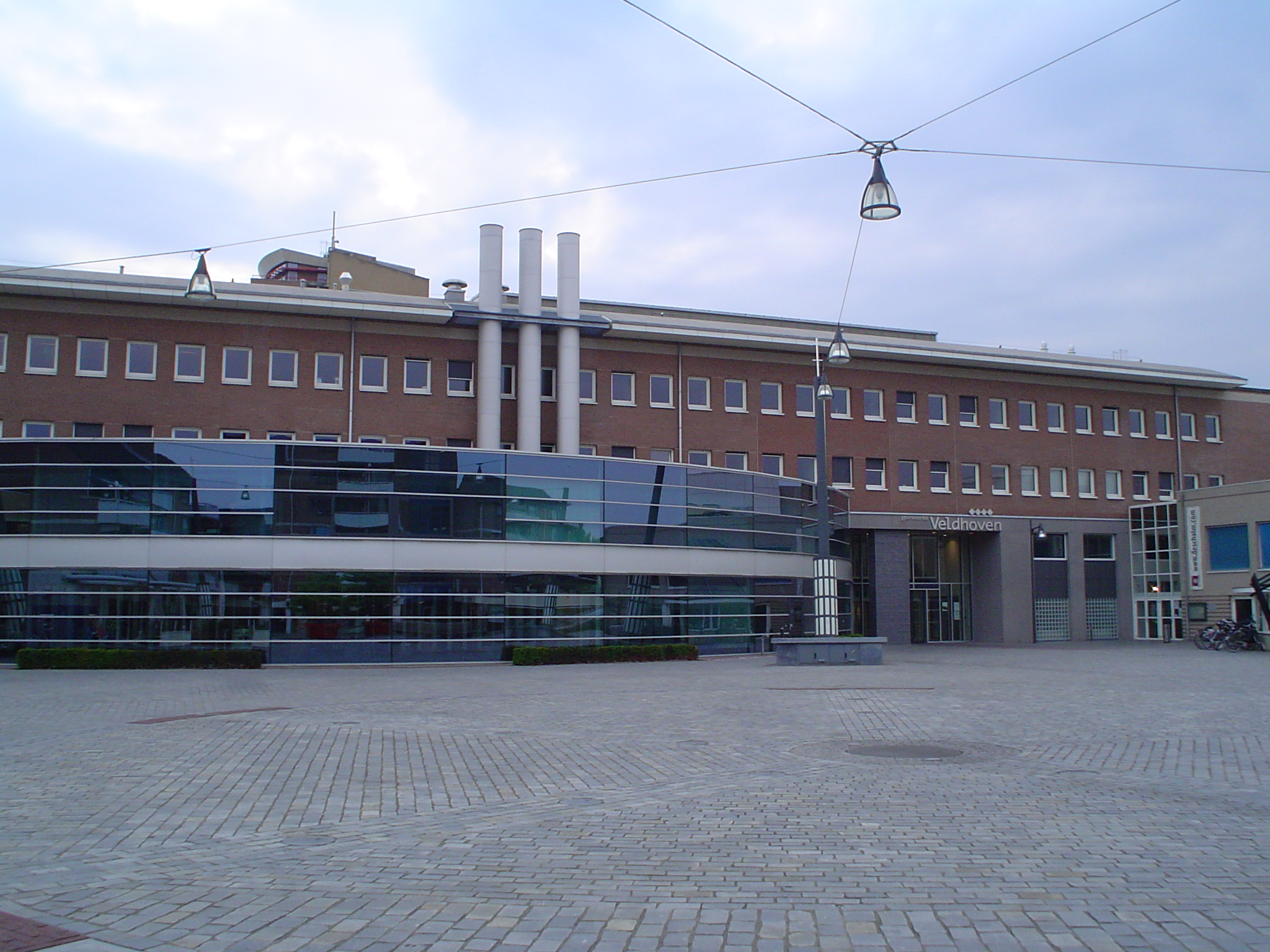
Town Hall - Veldhoven

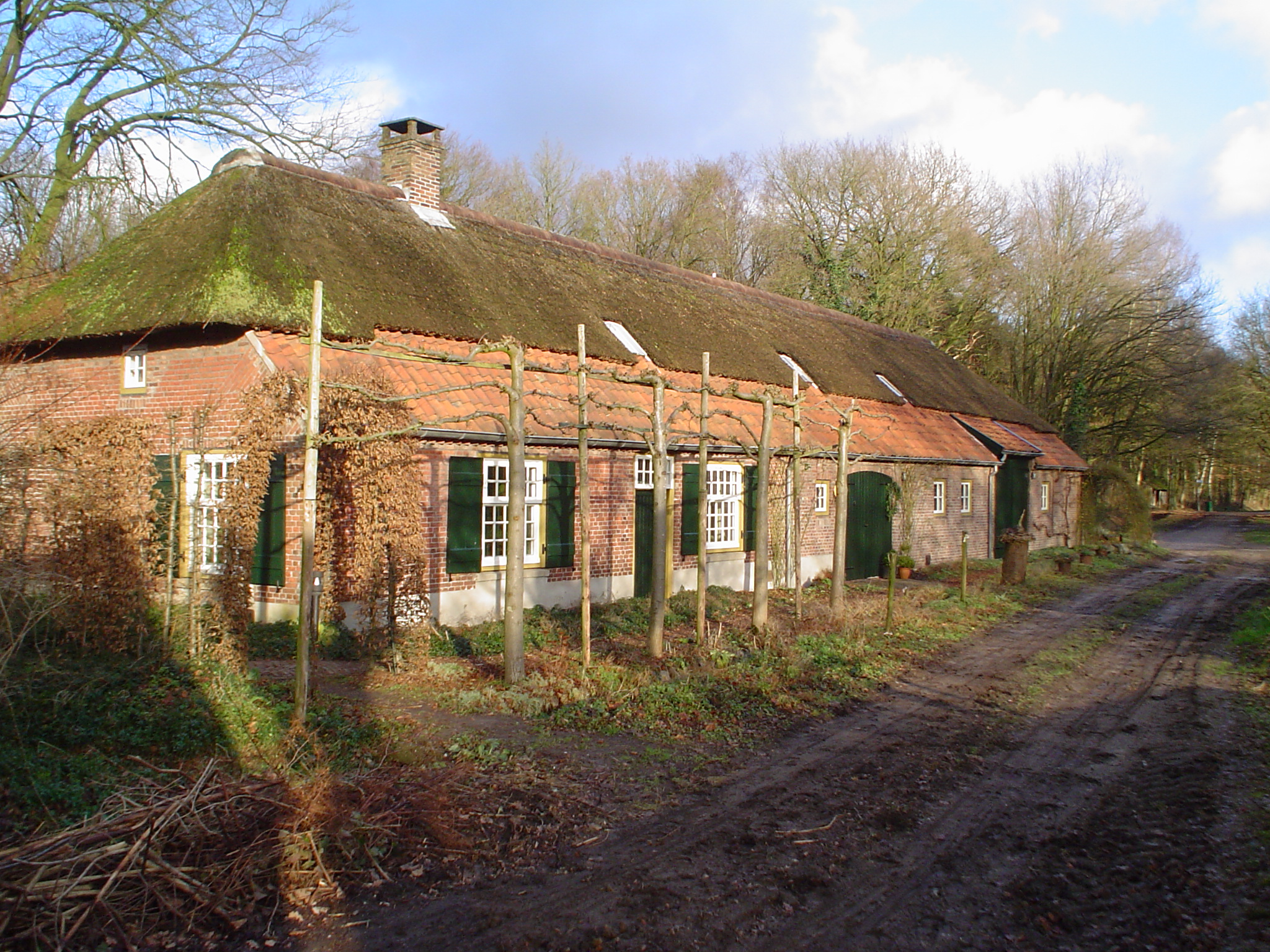
Kleine Vliet farm - Oerle

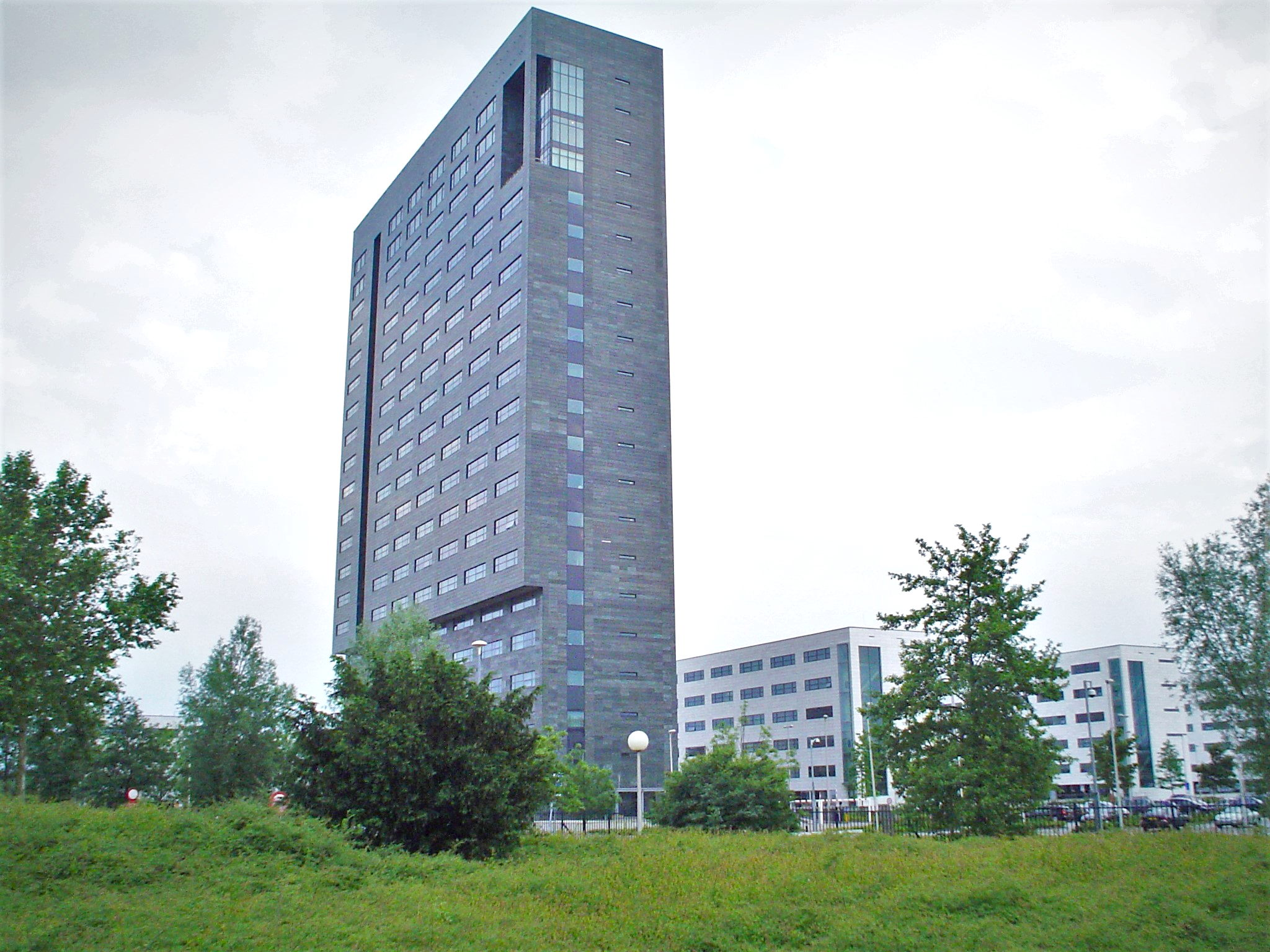
Corporate headquarters ASML

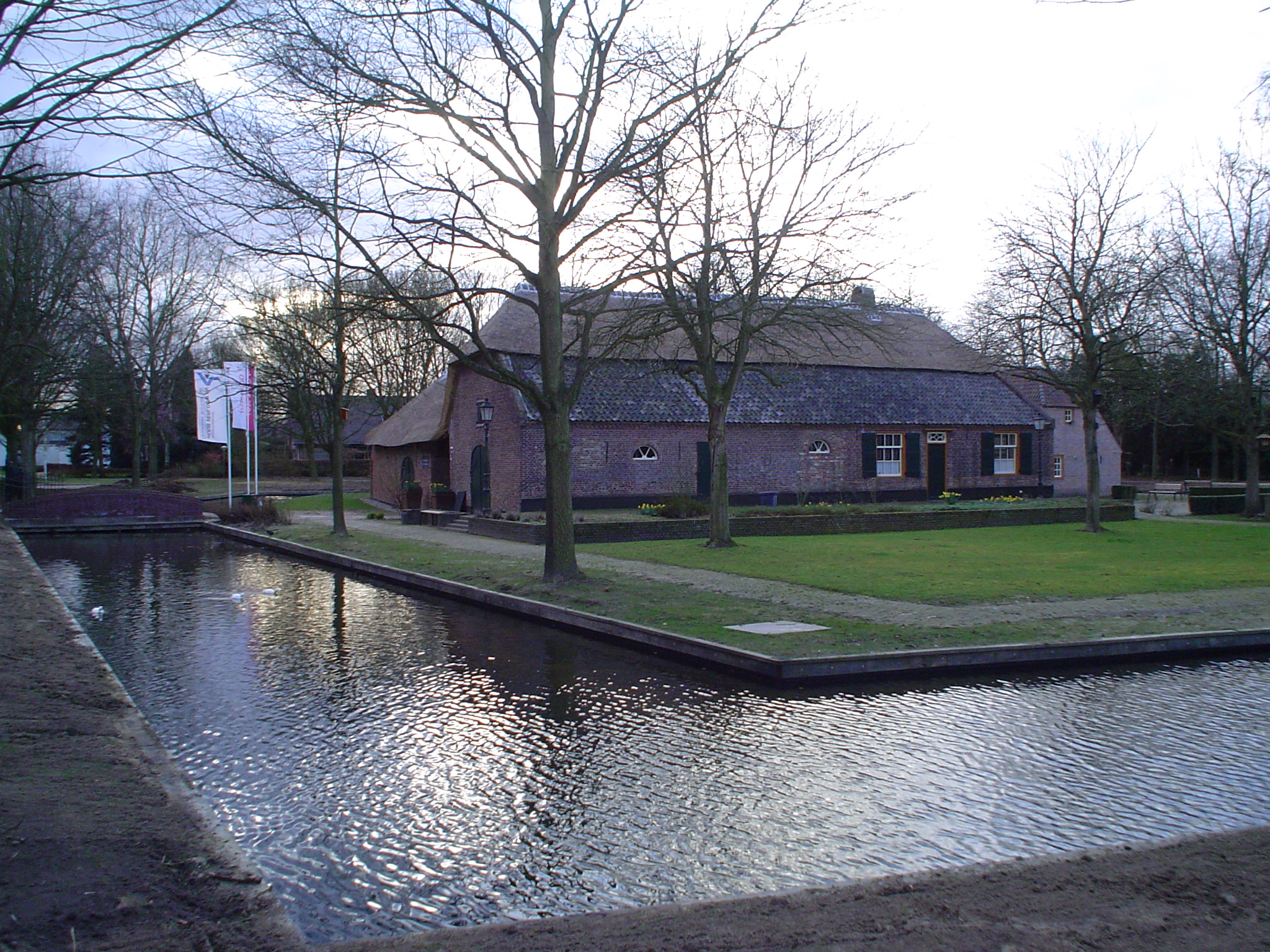
Museum 't Oude Slot

== See also ==
- Heikant, Veldhoven
- Veldhoven en Meerveldhoven
- Zeelst
- Oerle
