= Jocelyne Dakhlia =

French historian and anthropologist

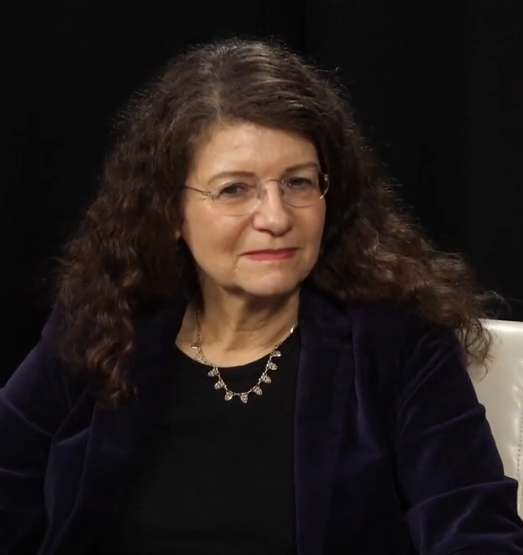
- In a 2024 interview
- Born: 1959 (age 66–67); Bourg-en-Bresse, France
- Education: École Normale Supérieure de Fontenay-aux-Roses
- Occupations: Historian, anthropologist

Jocelyne Naïma Dakhlia (born 1959) is a French historian and anthropologist. A director of studies at the École des hautes études en sciences sociales, her work is concerned principally with the political and cultural history of Islam in the Maghreb countries bordering the Mediterranean Sea.

== Biography ==
The daughter of a French mother and a Tunisian father, Dakhlia was born in Bourg-en-Bresse and brought up in Tunisia. After studying history at the École normale supérieure de Fontenay-aux-Roses, she specialized in the anthropological history of the Maghreb. She earned a doctorate at the École des hautes études en sciences sociales (EHESS) which she joined in 1990, later becoming a director of studies. She is on the management board of Annales. Histoire, Sciences Sociales, and contributes editorially to Arabica and Revue du monde musulman et de la Méditerranée. A member of the Conseil scientifique de l'Institut d'études de l'Islam, Dakhlia has coordinated studies on artistic creativity in the Islamic countries. Since 1990, Dakhlia has published several books and articles on developments in the Muslim countries and more recently has examined the effects of the Tunisian Revolution.

Dakhlia is a member of the French Unesco Committee and is a board member of the Museum of European and Mediterranean Civilisations.

In 2022, she was elected a member of the Academia Europaea.

== Selected works ==
- L'Oubli de la cité, Paris, La Découverte, 1990 ISBN 978-2-707-11911-7
- Le Divan des Rois. Le politique et le religieux dans l'Islam, Paris, Aubier, 1998 ISBN 978-2-700-72293-2
- L’empire des passions. L’arbitraire politique en Islam, Paris, Aubier, 2005 ISBN 978-2-700-72346-5
- Islamicités, Paris, Presses universitaires de France, 2005 ISBN 978-2-130-55095-2
- Lingua franca : histoire d'une langue métisse en Méditerranée, Arles, Actes Sud, 2008 ISBN 978-2-742-78077-8
- Tunisie, le pays sans bruit, Arles, Actes Sud, 2011, ISBN 978-2-330-00122-3
- Les musulmans dans l'histoire de l'Europe : passages et contacts en Méditerranée, Paris, Albin Michel, 2013, ISBN 978-2-226-20911-5
- Les musulmans dans l'histoire de l'Europe : une intégration invisible, Paris, Albin Michel, 2016, ISBN 978-2-226-20893-4
- Harems et Sultans : Genre et despotisme au Maroc et ailleurs, XIVe-XXe siècle: Coffret en 3 volumes : Tome 1, Le temps des gynécées; Tome 2, Le temps des sérails; Tome 3, Le temps des harems. Anacharsis. 2024. ISBN 979-10-279-0477-8.
