= Joscelyne =

Joscelyne is a surname. Notable people with the surname include:

- Albert Joscelyne (1866–1945), English Anglican bishop
- Barbara Joscelyne (born 1959), British Paralympic athlete
- Blair Joscelyne (born 1978), Australian composer, musician, producer, and film maker

== See also ==
- Jocelyn
