= Joceline Lega =

French physicist and applied mathematician

Academic background
- Education: École Normale Supérieure, Pierre and Marie Curie University
- Alma mater: University of Nice Sophia Antipolis

Academic work
- Discipline: Physics, Applied mathematics
- Institutions: University of Arizona, Centre national de la recherche scientifique
- Main interests: Nonlinear dynamics

Joceline Claude Lega is a French physicist and applied mathematician, interested in nonlinear dynamics. She is a professor in the departments of mathematics, applied mathematics, and epidemiology and biostatistics at the University of Arizona, and editor-in-chief of Physica D.

== Education and career ==
After studying physics at the École Normale Supérieure in Paris from 1984 to 1988, and earning licentiate and maîtrise degrees in physics through Pierre and Marie Curie University in 1985, Lega earned a diplôme d'études approfondies in 1986 and a doctorate in theoretical physics in 1989, both at the University of Nice Sophia Antipolis. Her dissertation was Topological defects associated with the breaking of time translation invariance.

She joined the Centre national de la recherche scientifique (CNRS) in 1989, and took a leave from CNRS to join the University of Arizona in 1997. At Arizona, she was the director of the Program in Integrated Science (from 2008 to 2011), and the Institute for Mathematics & Education (from 2009 to 2013). Since 2016 she is the associate head for the Postdoctoral Program in Mathematics.

== Recognition ==
Lega became a Fellow of the Institute of Physics in 2004. In 2017 she was elected as a Fellow of the American Association for the Advancement of Science.

== Selected publications ==
- Coullet, P.; Gil, L.; Lega, J. (April 1989), "Defect-mediated turbulence", Physical Review Letters, 62 (14): 1619–1622, Bibcode:1989PhRvL..62.1619C, doi:10.1103/physrevlett.62.1619, PMID 10039721
- Coullet, P.; Lega, J.; Houchmanzadeh, B.; Lajzerowicz, J. (September 1990), "Breaking chirality in nonequilibrium systems", Physical Review Letters, 65 (11): 1352–1355, Bibcode:1990PhRvL..65.1352C, doi:10.1103/physrevlett.65.1352, PMID 10042242
- Ciliberto, S.; Coullet, P.; Lega, J.; Pampaloni, E.; Perez-Garcia, C. (November 1990), "Defects in roll-hexagon competition" (PDF), Physical Review Letters, 65 (19): 2370–2373, Bibcode:1990PhRvL..65.2370C, doi:10.1103/physrevlett.65.2370, hdl:10171/2241, PMID 10042531
- Lega, J.; Moloney, J. V.; Newell, A. C. (November 1994), "Swift-Hohenberg Equation for Lasers", Physical Review Letters, 73 (22): 2978–2981, Bibcode:1994PhRvL..73.2978L, doi:10.1103/physrevlett.73.2978, hdl:10468/4664, PMID 10057251
- Lega, J.; Passot, T. (March 2003), "Hydrodynamics of bacterial colonies: A model", Physical Review E, 67 (3) 031906, Bibcode:2003PhRvE..67c1906L, doi:10.1103/physreve.67.031906, PMID 12689100
