= Jesselyn =

Dutch DJ (born 1980)

- Born: Jessy Seuntiens; 6 October 1980 (age 46); Oerle, Netherlands
- Genre: Electronica hard trance Hardstyle
- Occupations: DJ, musician, songwriter, producer
- Instruments: Turntables, keyboards
- Label: Freaky Records

Jessy Seuntiens (born 6 October 1980), known by her stage name Jesselyn is a Dutch DJ. She started her career in 2001. and was impressed by the techniques of other trance and hard-trance DJs, as she started to learn and improve her own abilities. She was able to play at the Frequency Festival in 2002.

== Discography ==
- Tonka (2004)
- Omnia (2004)
- Flora / Fauna (2005)
- Contact / Distance (2006)
- Iron / Cyrus (2006)
- Tank / Celestine (2007)
