= Zoubeida Ounaies =

Tunisian-American materials scientist

Zoubeida Ounaies is a Tunisian mechanical engineer, whose research involves nanocomposites, smart materials, and piezoelectricity in polymers. She is a professor of mechanical engineering at Pennsylvania State University, affiliated with the Penn State Intercollege Graduate Degree Program in Materials Science and Engineering and with the Institute of Energy and the Environment. At Penn State, she is director of the Convergence Center for Living Multifunctional Material Systems, and acting director of the Materials Research Institute.

== Education and career ==
Ounaies grew up in Tunisia, the daughter of an engineer. She went to Pennsylvania State University for her undergraduate and graduate education, funded by the Tunisia Technology Transfer Program of the United States Agency for International Development, and completed her Ph.D. in 1996.

After postdoctoral research at NASA's Langley Research Center from 1997 to 2001, she returned to Penn State as a faculty member in 2001. She moved to Texas A&M University in 2005, but returned to Penn State again in 2011.

== Recognition ==
Ounaies is an ASME Fellow, elected in 2016. She is also a Fellow of SPIE, the International Society for Optics and Photonics.
