= Oerle =

- Village
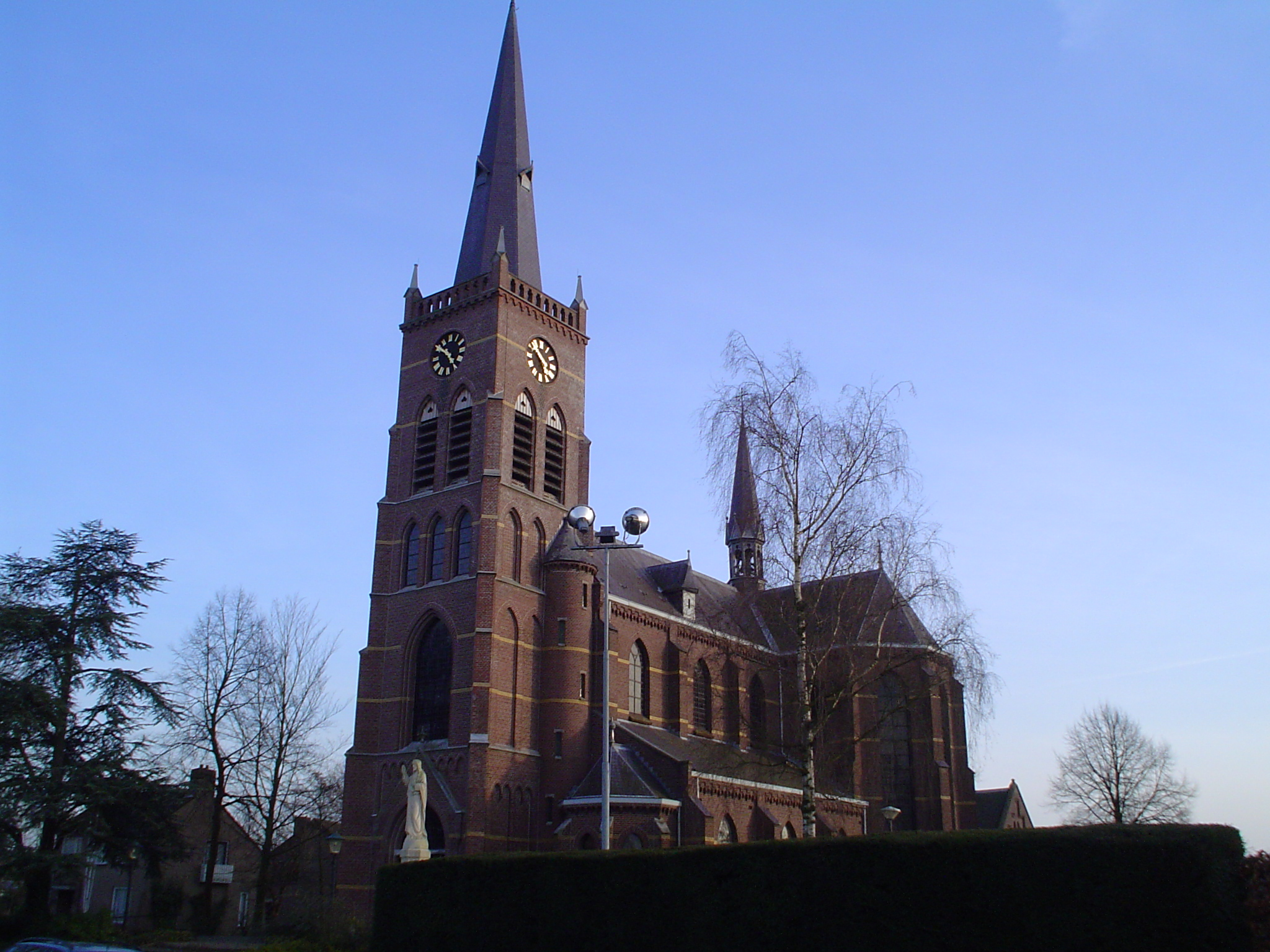
- St John, the Baptist Church

- Location in the province of North Brabant in the Netherlands Oerle (Netherlands)
- Coordinates: 51°25′20″N 5°22′14″E
- Country: Netherlands
- Province: North Brabant
- Municipality: Veldhoven

Area
  - Total: 2.07 km^{2} (0.80 sq mi)
- Elevation: 23 m (75 ft)

Population (2021)
  - Total: 2,940
  - Density: 1,420/km^{2} (3,680/sq mi)
- Time zone: UTC+1 (CET)
  - Summer (DST): UTC+2 (CEST)
- Postal code: 5507
- Dialing code: 040

Oerle is a village in the Dutch province of North Brabant. It is located in the municipality of Veldhoven, about 7 km west of Eindhoven.

The village was first mentioned in 1249 Oerle, and is a combination of "open forest" and "sand".

Oerle was home to 152 people in 1840. Oerle was a separate municipality until 1921, when it became part of Veldhoven.

The grist mill Sint Jan is reasonably new wind mill. It was constructed in 1987 from parts of demolished wind mills. The grain which is milled is sold by the miller. In the early 21st century, the village started to grow, and it is planned to grow to about 4,000 people.

== Gallery ==
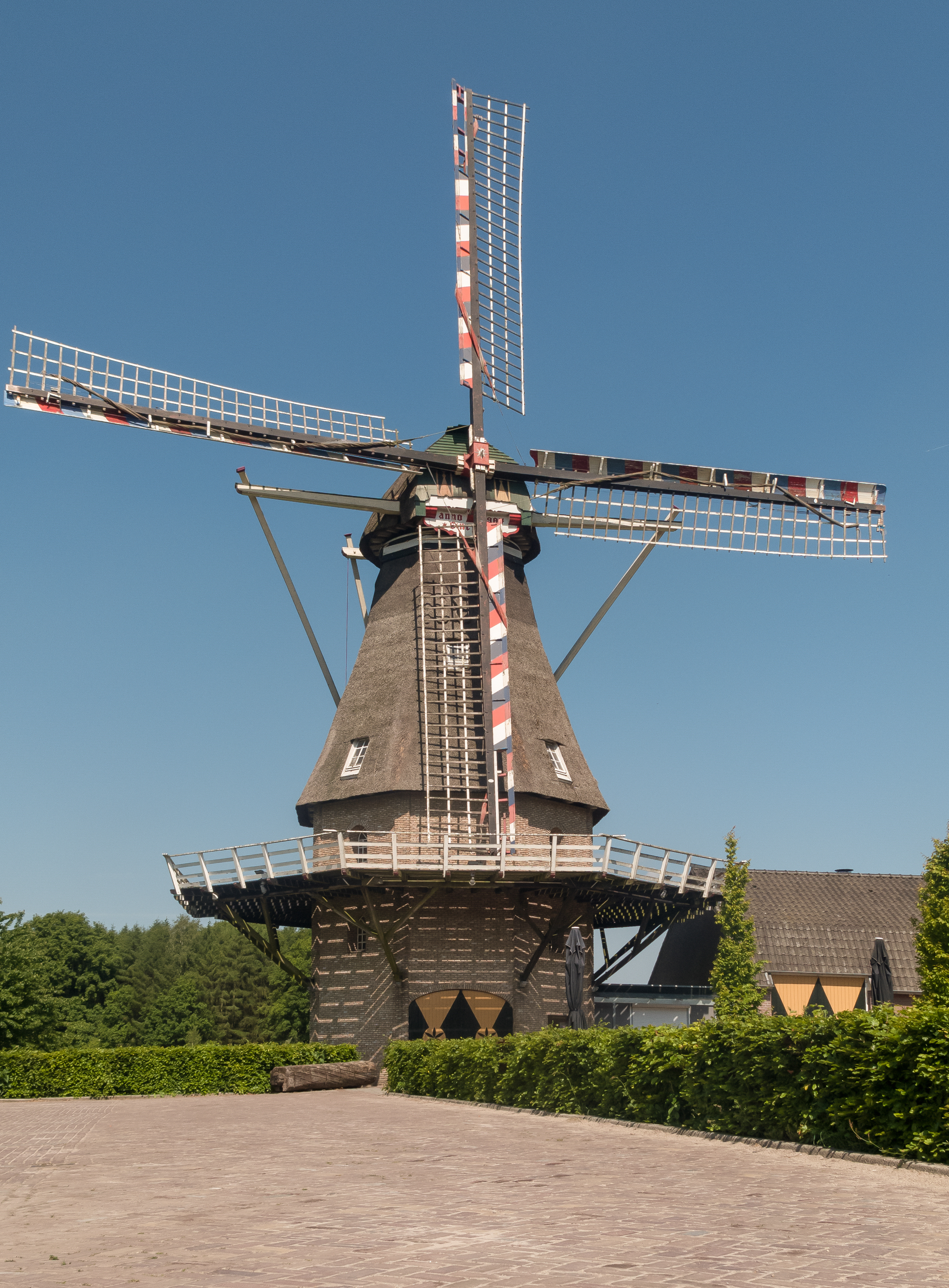
Oerle, windmill: korenmolen Sint Jan

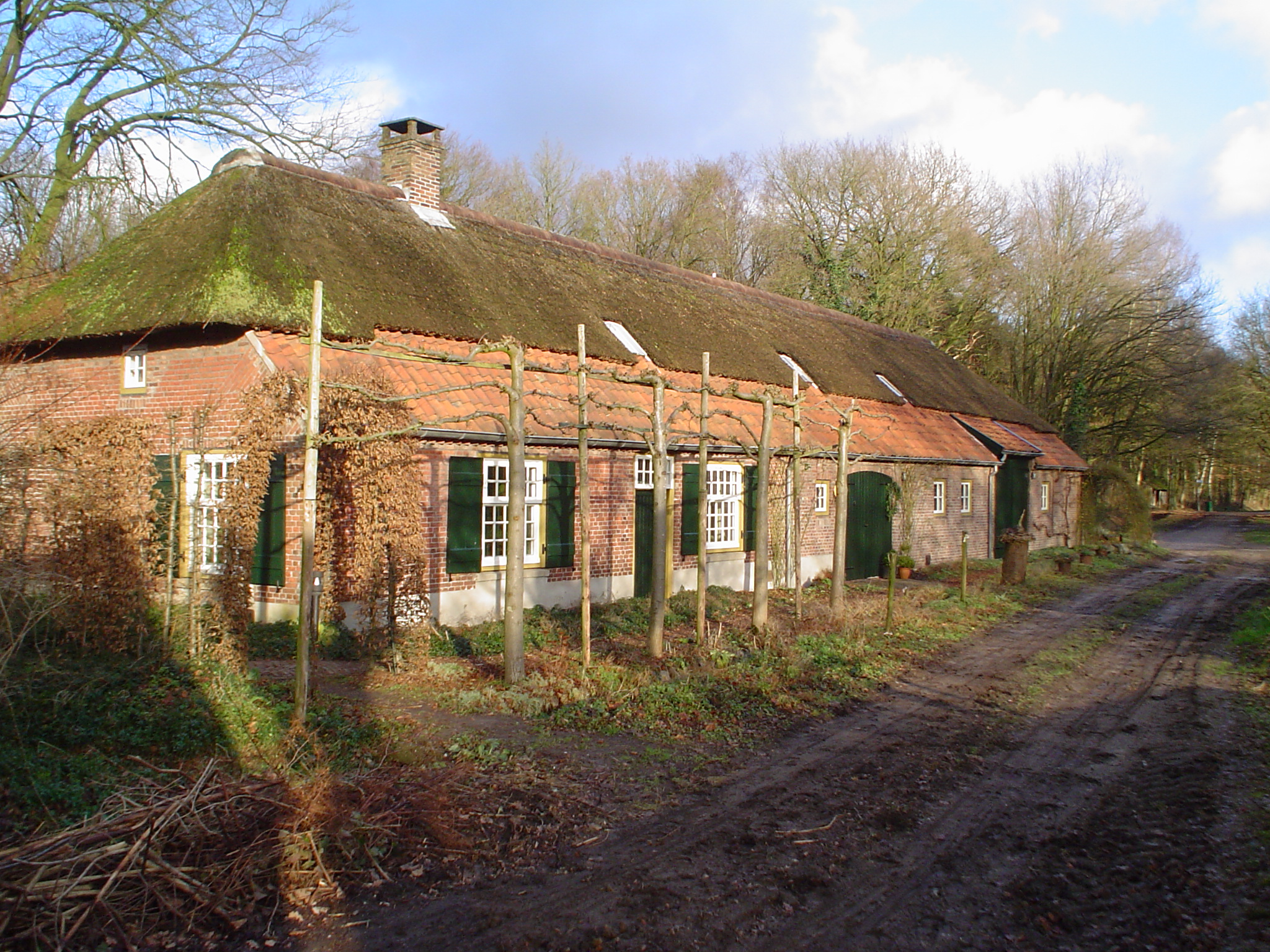
Farm in Oerle

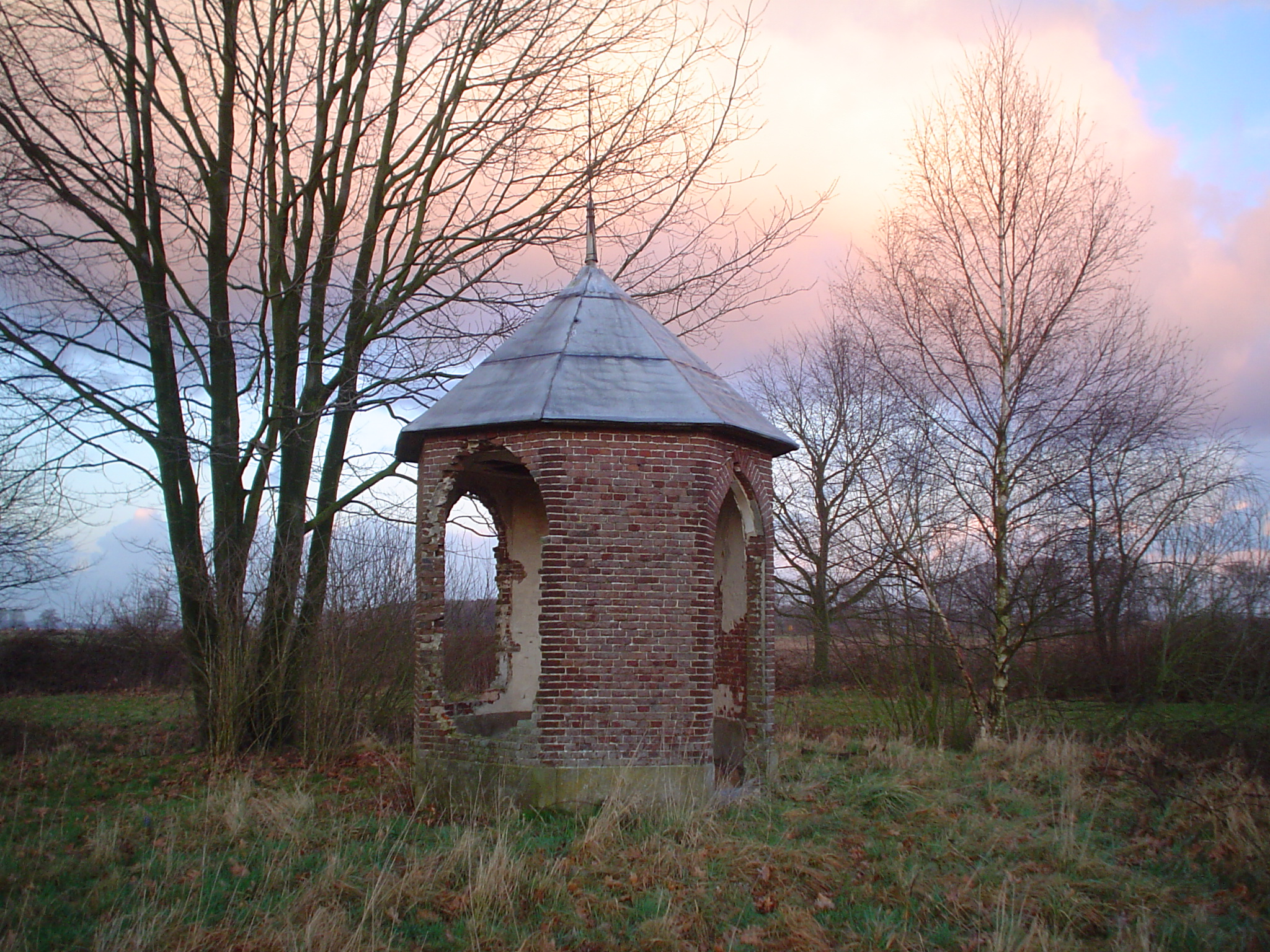
Derelict little tower
