= Joslin =

Joslin may refer to:

== People ==
- Joslin (surname)

== Places ==
- Joslin, South Australia
- Joslin, Illinois

== Other uses ==
- Joslins, a defunct department store in Denver, Colorado
- The Joslin's Canadian Open, the largest grappling tournament in Canada
- Joslin Diabetes Center, the world's largest diabetes research center, diabetes clinic, and provider of diabetes education
- Elliott P. Joslin, an American physician, founder of the Joslin Diabetes Center, Boston, MA
- Elliott P. Joslin Camps for Children with Diabetes Massachusetts based provider of diabetes education, treatment, and support with recreation, sports, and camping
- Joslin Dry Goods Company Building (also known as the Tritch Building or the Joslin Building), a historic building in downtown Denver, Colorado

== See also ==
- Jocelyn
