= Zeelst =

- Village
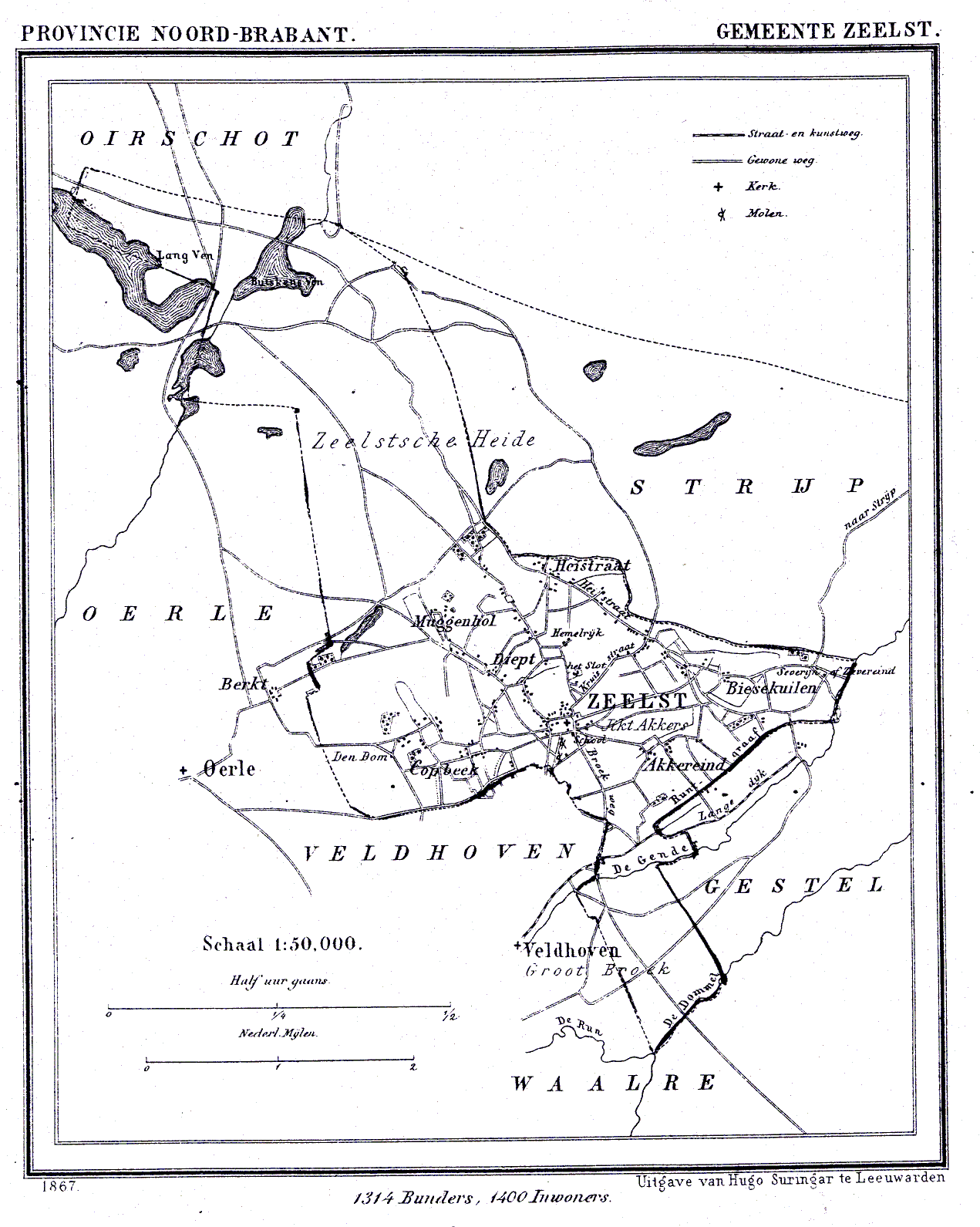
- Zeelst in 1867

- Location within North Brabant Location within Netherlands
- Coordinates: 51°25′23″N 5°24′59″E
- Country: Netherlands
- Province: North Brabant
- Municipality: Veldhoven

Population (Dec 31, 2006)
  - Total: 5,611
- Postal code: 5502
- Area code: 040

Zeelst is a former village in the Dutch province of North Brabant, now a neighbourhood of Veldhoven.

Zeelst was a separate municipality until 1921, when it became part of Veldhoven.

== Notable people ==
- Tiny Kox (b. 1953), politician
