= 2025–26 KNVB Cup =

Dutch football tournament season

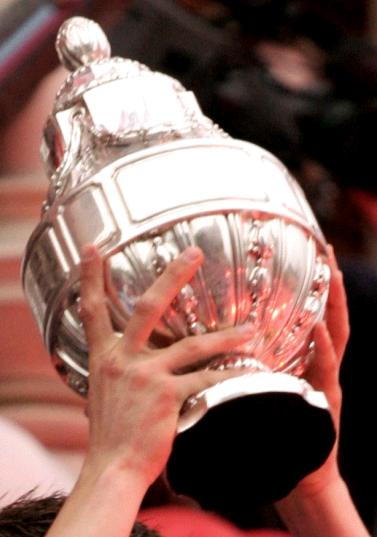
- KNVB Cup trophy

Tournament details
- Country: Netherlands
- Venue(s): De Kuip, Rotterdam
- Dates: 2 September 2025 – 19 April 2026

Final positions
- Champions: AZ (5th title)
- Runners-up: NEC

The 2025–26 KNVB Cup, for sponsoring reasons officially called the Eurojackpot KNVB Beker, was the 108th edition of the Dutch national football annual knockout tournament for the KNVB Cup. It was concluded on 19 April 2026 with the final played at De Kuip in Rotterdam, in which AZ won the trophy for the fifth time, beating NEC 5–1. The winners would qualify for the 2026–27 UEFA Europa League and the 2026 Johan Cruyff Shield. Go Ahead Eagles were the title holders, but lost to Telstar in the quarter-finals.

== Schedule ==
Round	Match Dates
First preliminary round	2–3 September 2025
Second preliminary round	23–24 September 2025
First round	28–30 October 2025
Second round	16–18 December 2025 (Note: The match between PEC Zwolle and AZ Alkmaar was moved to 3 December 2025 due to AZ's match against Jagiellonia Białystok in the UEFA Conference League on 18 December 2025.)
Round of 16	13–15 January 2026
Quarter-finals	3–5 February 2026
Semi-finals	3–5 March 2026
Final	19 April 2026

== First preliminary round ==
2 September 2025	SV Walcheren	1–3	VV Noordwijk	Vlissingen
20:00

2 September 2025	VVSB	1–2	VV Capelle	Noordwijkerhout
20:00

2 September 2025	VV Zwaluwen	1–2 (a.e.t.)	SV Urk	Vlaardingen
20:00

2 September 2025	SV TEC	3–2 (a.e.t.)	SV Poortugaal	Tiel
20:00

2 September 2025	SteDoCo	0–2	DVS '33	Hoornaar
20:00

2 September 2025	SVV Scheveningen	2–0	VV Staphorst	Scheveningen
20:00

2 September 2025	Rohda Raalte	4–1 (a.e.t.)	HVV Hollandia	Raalte
20:00

2 September 2025	d'Olde Veste '54	0–3	HSC '21	Steenwijk
20:00

2 September 2025	FC Lisse	1–0	RKVV Westlandia	Lisse
20:00

2 September 2025	VV Hoogeveen	6–1	Velocitas 1897	Hoogeveen
20:00

2 September 2025	Harkemase Boys	0–1 (a.e.t.)	Sparta Nijkerk	Harkema
20:00

2 September 2025	RKSV Halsteren	3–1 (a.e.t.)	ACV Assen	Halsteren
20:00

2 September 2025	DZOH	2–5 (a.e.t.)	Excelsior '31	Emmen
20:00

2 September 2025	SV De Foresters	2–2 (a.e.t.) (2–4 p)	VV Scherpenzeel	Heiloo
20:00

2 September 2025	Blauw Geel '38	1–1 (a.e.t.) (6–5 p)	VVOG	Veghel
20:00

2 September 2025	FC Aalsmeer	2–4	HZVV	Aalsmeer
20:00

3 September 2025	USV Hercules	4–0	VV Goes	Utrecht
20:00

3 September 2025	VV UNA	1–2	SV ARC	Zeelst
20:00

3 September 2025	TOGB	1–3	UDI '19	Berkel en Rodenrijs
20:00

3 September 2025	Juliana '31	0–2 (a.e.t.)	SV Meerssen	Malden
20:00

3 September 2025	Sportlust '46	4–1	RKVV Sportclub '25	Woerden
20:00

3 September 2025	Kozakken Boys	4–0	SV Kampong	Werkendam
20:00

3 September 2025	VV Kloetinge	3–0	VV DVO	Kloetinge
20:00

3 September 2025	IJsselmeervogels	0–1	SC Genemuiden	Bunschoten
20:00

3 September 2025	HSV Hoek	6–4	FC Rijnvogels	Hoek
20:00

3 September 2025	VV Heino	3–3 (a.e.t.) (5–6 p)	RKSV Groene Ster	Heino
20:00

3 September 2025	VV Gemert	2–1	SV Huizen	Gemert
20:00

3 September 2025	RKVV Erp	0–4	VV DOVO	Erp
20:00

3 September 2025	VV Eemdijk	4–0	VV Dongen	Bunschoten
20:00

3 September 2025	SV AWC	0–2	ASWH	Wijchen
20:00

3 September 2025	ADO '20	0–2	RBC Roosendaal	Wormerveer
20:00

3 September 2025	SC 't Zand	4–2	RKSV Mierlo-Hout	Tilburg
20:00

== Second preliminary round ==
23 September 2025	VV Scherpenzeel	3–4	VV Hoogeveen	Scherpenzeel
20:00

23 September 2025	VV DOVO	1–0	SV TEC	Veenendaal
20:00

23 September 2025	USV Hercules	1–3	SV Spakenburg	Utrecht
20:00

23 September 2025	UDI '19	0–1	Sportlust '46	Uden
20:00

23 September 2025	Sparta Nijkerk	4–3 (a.e.t.)	VV Kloetinge	Nijkerk
20:00

23 September 2025	RBC Roosendaal	0–1	GVVV	Roosendaal
20:00

23 September 2025	Rohda Raalte	1–0	DVS '33	Raalte
20:00

23 September 2025	VV Noordwijk	0–2	HHC Hardenberg	Noordwijk
20:00

23 September 2025	SV Meerssen	0–1 (a.e.t.)	VV Gemert	Meerssen
20:00

23 September 2025	FC Lisse	4–1	SV Urk	Lisse
20:00

23 September 2025	Kozakken Boys	2–3 (a.e.t.)	BVV Barendrecht	Werkendam
20:00

23 September 2025	HZVV	1–5	Excelsior Maassluis	Hoogeveen
20:00

23 September 2025	HSC '21	3–1 (a.e.t.)	SC 't Zand	Haaksbergen
20:00

23 September 2025	HSV Hoek	1–0	Blauw Geel '38	Hoek
20:00

23 September 2025	Koninklijke HFC	5–0	SV ARC	Haarlem
20:00

23 September 2025	RKSV Halsteren	3–2	ASWH	Halsteren
20:00

23 September 2025	VV Eemdijk	2–1	Excelsior '31	Bunschoten
20:00

23 September 2025	De Treffers	6–3 (a.e.t.)	RKAV Volendam	Groesbeek
20:00

23 September 2025	VV Capelle	5–1	SVV Scheveningen	Capelle aan den IJssel
20:00

24 September 2025	RKSV Groene Ster	1–1 (a.e.t.) (4–5 p)	SC Genemuiden	Heerlerheide
20:00

== First round ==
The draw for the first round took place on 26 September 2025, with matches being played on 28, 29 and 30 October. Ajax, AZ, Feyenoord, Go Ahead Eagles, PSV Eindhoven and Utrecht are exempt from this round due to their participation in European football.

28 October 2025	Den Bosch	3–3 (a.e.t.) (5–4 p)	ADO Den Haag	's-Hertogenbosch
18:45	Van Leeuwen 33', 50'; Monzialo 77'		Reischl 20'; Van Mieghem 23', 55' (pen.)	Stadium: De Vliert
	Penalties
	Van Grunsven (penalty missed); Boumassaoudi (penalty scored); Akmum (penalty missed); Felida (penalty scored); Fortes (penalty scored); El Bakkali (penalty missed); De Groot (penalty scored); Wolters (penalty scored)		(penalty missed) Vlak; (penalty scored) Peupion; (penalty missed) Bal; (penalty scored) Rottier; (penalty scored) Tomas; (penalty missed) Kilo; (penalty scored) Waem; (penalty missed) Thomas

28 October 2025	Gemert	0–1	Fortuna Sittard	Gemert
18:45			Peterson 48'	Stadium: Sportpark Molenbroek; Referee: Robin Hensgens

28 October 2025	Capelle	1–5	Roda JC Kerkrade	Capelle aan den IJssel
20:00	Waandels 83' (pen.)		Griffith 23', 56'; Cooper-Love 35', 54' (pen.); Müller 69'	Stadium: Sportpark 't Slot

28 October 2025	GVVV	4–2	De Graafschap	Veenendaal
20:00	Spies 3', 54'; Van Soest 6'; Veenhof 39'		Theodoridis 23'; Simons 57' (pen.)	Stadium: Sportpark Panhuis

28 October 2025	HHC Hardenberg	0–2	TOP Oss	Hardenberg
20:00			Bouws 65' (o.g.); Van Bost 85'	Stadium: De Boshoek

28 October 2025	Helmond Sport	1–4	PEC Zwolle	Helmond
20:00	Daneels 5'		De Rooij 22'; Shoretire 32'; Oosting 74', 84'	Stadium: GS Staalwerken Stadion

28 October 2025	Hoogeveen	1–0	Emmen	Hoogeveen
20:00	Egbers 22' (pen.)			Stadium: Sportpark Bentinckspark

28 October 2025	Katwijk	1–1 (a.e.t.) (4–3 p)	Vitesse	Katwijk
20:00	Brenna 78'		Hoogewerf 59'	Stadium: Sportpark De Krom
	Penalties
	Maatsen (penalty missed); Van Wageningen (penalty scored); Menelik (penalty scored); Sinteur (penalty missed); Suleiman (penalty scored); Ravensbergen (penalty missed); Bouwense (penalty scored)		(penalty scored) Bannis; (penalty scored) Zonneveld; (penalty missed) Schikora; (penalty scored) Schwarz; (penalty missed) Thenu; (penalty missed) Ranon; (penalty missed) Moustafa

28 October 2025	Sparta Nijkerk	0–2	Almere City	Nijkerk
20:00			De Haan 61'; Rijkhoff 90+3'	Stadium: De Ebbenhorst

28 October 2025	VVV-Venlo	0–3	Heerenveen	Venlo
21:00			Sejk 21'; Meerveld 47'; Verheij 73' (o.g.)	Stadium: De Koel

29 October 2025	Quick Boys	1–2	Volendam	Katwijk aan Zee
18:45	De Beste 33'		Kuwas 11'; Oehlers 16'	Stadium: Nieuw Zuid

29 October 2025	Genemuiden	1–0	Halsteren	Genemuiden
20:00	Beimers 45+3'			Stadium: Sportpark de Wetering

29 October 2025	Hoek	3–2 (a.e.t.)	Eindhoven	Hoek
20:00	Hage 3'; Martens 88'; Sula 119'		Essers 23'; Janga 41'	Stadium: Sportpark Denoek

29 October 2025	HSC '21	3–0	Koninklijke HFC	Haaksbergen
20:00	Schrijver 24'; Holsink 74'; Rensink 86'			Stadium: Groot Scholtenhagen

29 October 2025	Lisse	0–5	Telstar	Lisse
20:00 CET (UTC+1)		Report	Bakker 14' (pen.); Zonneveld 34', 42', 48'; Noslin 56'	Stadium: Ter Specke; Attendance: 3,000; Referee: Rick Sturm

29 October 2025	NAC Breda	1–4	Heracles Almelo	Breda
20:00	Kemper 54'		Hrustic 21'; Hornkamp 34'; Borges Sanches 68'; Ould-Chikh 90+1'	Stadium: Rat Verlegh Stadion

29 October 2025	RKC Waalwijk	3–2	Cambuur	Waalwijk
20:00	Van der Leij 39'; Castillo 50'; Held 74'		Rölke 52'; Diemers 56' (pen.)	Stadium: Mandemakers Stadion

29 October 2025	Excelsior Maassluis	1–0 (a.e.t.)	Excelsior	Maassluis
21:00	Nagtegaal 120+1'			Stadium: Sportpark Dijkpolder

30 October 2025	Rijnsburgse Boys	2–3	NEC	Rijnsburg
18:45	Kariouh 43'; Van der Weijden 65'		Lebreton 10', 23'; Ouaissa 21'	Stadium: Middelmors

30 October 2025	De Treffers	3–1	MVV Maastricht	Groesbeek
20:00	Van Bakel 8', 78'; Yadir 59'		El Basri 29'	Stadium: Sportpark Zuid

30 October 2025	Eemdijk	1–2	AFC	Bunschoten
20:00	Van Dalen 8'		Klopper 48'; Fonseca 61'	Stadium: De Vinken

30 October 2025	Spakenburg	5–1	DOVO	Spakenburg
20:00	Wesdorp 5'; Van Huffel 23'; Van Mil 35'; Puriel 58'; Van der Linden 71'		Wormgoor 77'	Stadium: Sportpark De Westmaat

30 October 2025	Sparta Rotterdam	5–2	Groningen	Rotterdam
20:00	Ltaief 2'; Lauritsen 46'; Martins Indi 53'; Oufkir 72', 90+2'		Taha 10'; Van Bergen 20'	Stadium: Sparta Stadion Het Kasteel

30 October 2025	Sportlust '46	0–0 (a.e.t.) (4–3 p)	Barendrecht	Woerden
20:00				Stadium: Sportpark Cromwijck
	Penalties
	Fichtinger (penalty scored); Delgado Mendes (penalty scored); Damkalis (penalty scored); Hudepohl (penalty scored)		(penalty scored) Schop; (penalty scored) Bayram; (penalty scored) Van der Heijden; (penalty missed) Rimon; (penalty missed) Jongman

30 October 2025	Willem II	7–0	Dordrecht	Tilburg
20:00	Bamba 5'; Haen 14'; Hoogma 17'; El Allouchi 29'; Tjoe-A-On 39'; Kehrer 82', 88'			Stadium: Koning Willem II Stadion

30 October 2025	Rohda Raalte	1–4	Twente	Raalte
21:00	Willemsen 15'		Lammers 34'; Verschueren 50'; Ørjasæter 58'; Kuipers 78'	Stadium: Sportpark Tijenraan

== Second round ==
The draw for the second round took place on 31 October 2025.

3 December 2025	PEC Zwolle	1–3	AZ	Zwolle
20:00	Kostons 43'		Mijnans 53', 82'; Sadiq 90+2'	Stadium: MAC3PARK Stadion; Referee: Danny Makkelie

16 December 2025	Heracles Almelo	4–1	Hoogeveen	Almelo
18:45	te Wierik 28'; Hrustic 56'; van Gilst 70'; Bruns 73'		Van Hoorenbeeck 83' (o.g.)	Stadium: Asito Stadion; Attendance: 8,505; Referee: Rob Dieperink

16 December 2025	AFC	1–3	NEC	Amsterdam
20:00	Ederveen 26'		Rober 2'; Shiogai 82', 85'	Stadium: Sportpark Goed Genoeg; Referee: Stan Teuben

16 December 2025	Den Bosch	2–1	Katwijk	's-Hertogenbosch
20:00	Fortes 16'; Boushaba 90+3'		Suleiman 8'	Stadium: De Vliert; Referee: Clay Ruperti

16 December 2025	Hoek	1–4	Telstar	Hoek
20:00	Martens 81'		Owusu 33'; Brouwer 49'; Offerhaus 79'; Zonneveld 90+4'	Stadium: Sportpark Denoek; Referee: Martin van den Kerkhof

16 December 2025	PSV Eindhoven	3–0	GVVV	Eindhoven
21:00	Til 8'; Wanner 10'; Perišić 53'			Stadium: Philips Stadion; Referee: Erwin Blank

17 December 2025	Excelsior Maassluis	2–7	Ajax	Rotterdam
18:45	Plank 53'; Verbont 60'		Wijndal 12'; Gaaei 19'; Konadu 24'; Mokio 40', 48'; Bounida 56'; Moro 65'	Stadium: Het Kasteel; Referee: Martijn Vos

17 December 2025	TOP Oss	0–2	Utrecht	Oss
20:00			Demircan 31'; Jensen 84'	Stadium: Frans Heesen Stadion; Referee: Marc Nagtegaal

17 December 2025	Roda JC	1–1 (1–3 p)	Go Ahead Eagles	Kerkrade
20:00	Kruiver 71'		Goudmijn 51'	Stadium: Parkstad Limburg Stadion; Referee: Sander van der Eijk

17 December 2025	Fortuna Sittard	2–3	Almere City	Sittard
20:00	Lonwijk 11'; Sierhuis 64'		van de Blaak 24'; Rijkhoff 76'; de Nijs 87'	Stadium: Fortuna Sittard Stadion; Referee: Allard Lindhout

17 December 2025	Feyenoord	2–3	Heerenveen	Rotterdam
21:00	Valente 64'; Willemsen 83' (o.g.)		Vente 25'; Rivera 77'; Trenskow 90'	Stadium: De Kuip; Referee: Joey Kooij

18 December 2025	Spakenburg	3–6	Twente	Spakenburg
18:45	van der Linden 69'; Kunst 88'; Van Lopik 90'		Rots 40'; Ørjasæter 54'; van den Belt 59'; Hlynsson 73'; Weidmann 75'; van Wolfswinkel 86'	Stadium: Sportpark De Westmaat; Referee: Jannick van der Laan

18 December 2025	Volendam	2–0 (a.e.t.)	Genemuiden	Volendam
20:00	Oehlers 108'; Veerman 114'			Stadium: Kras Stadion; Referee: Bas Nijhuis

18 December 2025	HSC '21	0–9	RKC Waalwijk	Haaksbergen
20:00			van der Leij 15', 43', 45'; Lokesa 20', 41'; Altena 33', 46'; Held 60'; van der Venne 80'	Stadium: Sportpark Groot Scholtenhagen; Referee: Wouter Wiersma

18 December 2025	Sportlust '46	0–1	De Treffers	Woerden
20:00			den Dekker 16'	Stadium: Sportpark Cromwijck; Referee: Laurens Gerrets

18 December 2025	Willem II	1–5	Sparta Rotterdam	Tilburg
21:00	Behounek 48'		Mito 21', 39'; Þeyr Þórisson 57'; Duijvestijn 79'; Lauritsen 88' (pen.)	Stadium: Koning Willem II Stadion; Referee: Alex Bos

== Round of 16 ==
The 16 second round winners entered the Round of 16. The draw for the round of 16 took place on 19 December 2025.

13 January 2026	Utrecht	1–2	Twente	Utrecht
21:00	De Wit 12'		van Wolfswinkel 68'; Rots 82'	Stadium: Stadion Galgenwaard; Referee: Serdar Gözübüyük

14 January 2026	Den Bosch	1–4	PSV Eindhoven	's-Hertogenbosch
18:45	Verbeek 78'		Driouech 11', 26'; Man 13'; Bajraktarević 22'	Stadium: De Vliert; Referee: Rob Dieperink

14 January 2026	Almere City	1–3	Telstar	Almere
20:00	Burgering 85'		Zonneveld 1'; Brouwer 48'; Offerhaus 62'	Stadium: Yanmar Stadion; Attendance: 3,110; Referee: Ingmar Oostrom

14 January 2026	Go Ahead Eagles	2–2 (a.e.t.) (2–1 p)	Heracles Almelo	Deventer
20:00	Smit 9'; Suray 82'		Kulenović 5'; Hrustic 62'	Stadium: De Adelaarshorst; Attendance: 8,722; Referee: Marc Nagtegaal
	Penalties
	Deijl (penalty scored); Twigt (penalty scored); Smit (penalty missed); Kramer (penalty missed)		(penalty missed) Kulenović; (penalty scored) Engels; (penalty missed) Ould-Chikh; (penalty missed) Hrustic; (penalty missed) Limbombe

14 January 2026	AZ	6–0	Ajax	Alkmaar
21:00	Parrott 2', 33', 80'; Koopmeiners 45+1'; Smit 47'; Sadiq 88'			Stadium: AFAS Stadion; Referee: Bas Nijhuis

15 January 2026	Heerenveen	3–1	RKC Waalwijk	Heerenveen
18:45	Trenskow 40', 90+1'; Braude 75'		Uneken 65'	Stadium: Abe Lenstra Stadion; Referee: Martijn Vos

15 January 2026	Sparta Rotterdam	1–2	Volendam	Rotterdam
21:00	Santos 32'		Kuwas 13'; Mühren 90+1'	Stadium: Het Kasteel

20 January 2026	De Treffers	1–2	NEC	Groesbeek
18:45	Den Dekker 50'		Önal 3'; Kaplan 65'	Stadium: Sportpark Zuid

== Quarter-finals ==
The eight round of 16 winners entered the quarter-finals. The draw for the quarter-finals took place on 16 January 2026.

3 February 2026	AZ	2–1 (a.e.t.)	Twente	Alkmaar
20:00	Šín 9'; Parrott 97'		Hlynsson 65'	Stadium: AFAS Stadion; Referee: Martin van den Kerkhof

4 February 2026	NEC	1–0	Volendam	Nijmegen
18:45	Ouaissa 75'			Stadium: Goffertstadion; Referee: Jeroen Manschot

4 February 2026	PSV Eindhoven	4–1	Heerenveen	Eindhoven
21:00	Bajraktarević 23', 32'; Perišić 54'; Wanner 57'		Oyen 77'	Stadium: Philips Stadion; Referee: Joey Kooij

5 February 2026	Telstar	2–1	Go Ahead Eagles	Velsen-Zuid
20:00	Hetli 45'; Hardeveld 59' (pen.)		Sampsted 52'	Stadium: BUKO Stadion; Referee: Rob Dieperink

== Semi-finals ==
The four quarter-final winners entered the semi-finals. The draw for the semi-finals took place on 6 February 2026.

3 March 2026	NEC	3–2	PSV Eindhoven	Nijmegen
20:00	Linssen 6'; Dasa 37'; Önal 61'		Saibari 16'; Man 20'	Stadium: Goffertstadion; Attendance: 12,650; Referee: Serdar Gözübüyük

4 March 2026	AZ	2–1	Telstar	Alkmaar
20:00	Bakker 47' (o.g.); Ogidi Nwankwo 51' (o.g.)		Tejan 74'	Stadium: AFAS Stadion; Attendance: 18,402; Referee: Jeroen Manschot

== Final ==
The final was held between the two semi-final winners on 19 April 2026.

19 April 2026
18:00 UTC+02:00

AZ	5–1	NEC
De Wit 32'; Mijnans 67'; Koopmeiners 73'; Smit 90+1'; Parrott 90+5'	Report	Ogawa 78'

De Kuip, Rotterdam
Attendance: 46,500
Referee: Danny Makkelie
