= 2020–21 Tweede Divisie =

Tweede Divisie
- Season: 2020–21
- Champions: None
- Promoted: No promotion
- Relegated: No relegation

The 2020–21 Tweede Divisie season was the fifth edition of the Dutch third tier since on hiatus from 1970-71 season and the 20th edition using Tweede Divisie name.

At an extraordinary KNVB federation meeting on 2 October 2017, representatives of the amateur and professional football reached an agreement about the route to be taken to renew the football pyramid. Part of this agreement was that no promotion or relegation took place between the Eerste and Tweede Divisie for the 2017–18 season at first.

At another extraordinary KNVB meeting on 7 June 2018, an agreement was reached about the number of reserves teams allowed in each division as of the 2019–20 season and the extension of the non-promotion or relegation clause to initially two more seasons. For the Tweede Divisie it has been two teams.

The KNVB met again on 16 December 2019 and decided to further extend the clause to last until 2022–23 and to relegate reserve teams from the Tweede Divisie along with the other second teams in the new under-21 competition.

== Effects of the coronavirus pandemic ==
In the previous season, on 31 March 2020, the KNVB decided to cancel all competitions at amateur level. They also decided, for those competitions involved, there would be no final standings, and therefore no champions, no promotions and no relegations.

As a result this season started with the exact same teams as the previous season.

On 3 December 2020, the KNVB announced that the regular competition would no longer be continued. Instead, the league would have been split into two groups of nine teams followed by playoffs. On 24 February 2021, the KNVB eventually discontinued ongoing category A senior competitions, from Tweede Divisie and below, again without promotion or relegation.

== Teams ==
Location of teams in the Tweede Divisie 2020-21
South Holland clubs in the Tweede Divisie 2020/21

Club	Location	Venue	Capacity
AFC	Amsterdam	Sportpark Goed Genoeg	3,000
ASWH	Hendrik-Ido-Ambacht	Sportpark Schildman	3,000
Excelsior Maassluis	Maassluis	Sportpark Dijkpolder	5,000
GVVV	Veenendaal	Sportpark Panhuis	3,950
HHC Hardenberg	Hardenberg	Sportpark De Boshoek	4,500
Koninklijke HFC	Haarlem	Sportpark Spanjaardslaan	1,500
IJsselmeervogels	Spakenburg	Sportpark De Westmaat	9,000
Jong Sparta	Rotterdam	Het Kasteel	11,000
Jong Volendam	Volendam	Kras Stadion	7,384
Katwijk	Katwijk	Sportpark De Krom	6,000
Kozakken Boys	Werkendam	Sportpark De Zwaaier	4,000
Noordwijk	Noordwijk	Sportpark Duin Wetering	6,100
Quick Boys	Katwijk aan Zee	Sportpark Nieuw Zuid	8,100
Rijnsburgse Boys	Rijnsburg	Sportpark Middelmors	6,100
Scheveningen	Scheveningen	Sportpark Houtrust	3,500
SV Spakenburg	Spakenburg	Sportpark De Westmaat	8,500
TEC	Tiel	Sportpark De Lok	2,500
De Treffers	Groesbeek	Sportpark Zuid	4,000

== Standings ==
=== Regular competition ===
Pos	Team	Pld	W	D	L	GF	GA	GD	Pts
1	AFC	5	4	1	0	15	5	+10	13
2	ASWH	6	4	0	2	12	7	+5	12
3	SV Spakenburg	6	3	3	0	11	6	+5	12
4	Quick Boys	6	4	0	2	7	8	−1	12
5	IJsselmeervogels	5	3	0	2	9	10	−1	9
6	Rijnsburgse Boys	5	2	2	1	10	6	+4	8
7	Kozakken Boys	5	2	2	1	12	10	+2	8
8	Katwijk	5	2	2	1	9	7	+2	8
9	HHC Hardenberg	6	2	2	2	7	7	0	8
10	Koninklijke HFC	4	2	0	2	6	5	+1	6
11	Jong Volendam	6	1	2	3	9	13	−4	5
12	GVVV	6	1	2	3	6	11	−5	5
13	TEC	4	1	1	2	6	6	0	4
14	Excelsior Maassluis	5	1	1	3	6	10	−4	4
15	Jong Sparta	6	0	4	2	6	9	−3	4
16	Scheveningen	4	0	3	1	3	4	−1	3
17	Noordwijk	5	0	3	2	7	10	−3	3
18	De Treffers	5	0	2	3	2	9	−7	2

Source: Soccerway
Rules for classification: Season in progress: 1) Most points won; 2) Less points lost; 3) Goal difference; 4) Goals scored; 5) Alphabetical order; End of season: 1) Points; 2) Goal difference; 3) Goals scored; 4) Head-to-head points; 5) Head-to-head goal difference; 6) Head-to-head away goals scored; 7) Play-off if relevant for deciding champion, relegation or participating in a European league, otherwise by draw. 8) Penalty shoot-out (only after a play-off)

== Fixtures/results ==
Home \ Away	AFC	ASW	EXM	GVV	HFC	HHC	IJS	JSP	JVO	KAT	KOZ	NOO	QUI	RIJ	SCH	SPA	TEC	TRE
AFC		3–2											5–1					
ASWH												3–1	2–0					2–0
Excelsior Maassluis									1–3	0–2				2–2				
GVVV			0–2									2–1				0–3		
Koninklijke HFC																1–2		3–1
HHC Hardenberg	0–2						0–2	3–1										
IJsselmeervogels									4–3					2–1				
Jong Sparta				2–2									0–1		1–1			
Jong Volendam						0–2		2–2										1–1
Katwijk											2–2						2–1	
Kozakken Boys		3–2					4–1											
Noordwijk	2–2					2–2				1–1								
Quick Boys				2–1	1–0		2–0											
Rijnsburgse Boys									3–0		3–1				1–1			
Scheveningen		0–1														1–1		
SV Spakenburg								0–0		3–2	2–2							
TEC			3–1	1–1	1–2													
De Treffers	0–3			3–0		0–0												

Source: Soccerway
Legend: Blue = home team win; Yellow = draw; Red = away team win.
