= 2019–20 Tweede Divisie =

Tweede Divisie
- Season: 2019–20
- Champions: No champions.
- Promoted: No team promoted.
- Relegated: No team relegated.

The 2019–20 Tweede Divisie season was the fourth edition of the Dutch third tier since on hiatus from 1970-71 season and the 19th edition using Tweede Divisie name. Thirteen teams competed from the last season along with five promoted teams from the Derde Divisie.

At an extraordinary KNVB federation meeting on 2 October 2017, representatives of the amateur and professional football reached an agreement about the route to be taken to renew the football pyramid. Part of this agreement was that no promotion/relegation will take place between the Eerste and Tweede Divisie for the current season.

At another extraordinary KNVB federation meeting on 7 June 2018, an agreement was reached about the number of reserves teams allowed in each division as of season 2019–20. For the Tweede Divisie it will be 2 teams.

== Effects of the 2020 coronavirus pandemic ==
On 12 March 2020, all football leagues were suspended until 31 March as the Dutch government forbade events due to the COVID-19 pandemic in the Netherlands. On 15 March this period was extended until 6 April. Due to the decision of the Dutch government to forbid all gatherings and events until 1 June 2020, this period was even further extended.

Eventually, on 31 March 2020, the KNVB decided not to resume competitions at amateur level. They also decided, for those competitions involved, there would be no final standings, and therefore no champions, no promotions and no relegations. All teams will start next season at the same level as they did this season.

== Teams ==
Location of teams in the Tweede Divisie 2019-20
South Holland clubs in the Tweede Divisie 2019/20

Club	Location	Venue	Capacity
AFC	Amsterdam	Sportpark Goed Genoeg	3,000
ASWH	Hendrik-Ido-Ambacht	Sportpark Schildman	3,000
Excelsior Maassluis	Maassluis	Sportpark Dijkpolder	5,000
GVVV	Veenendaal	Sportpark Panhuis	3,950
HHC Hardenberg	Hardenberg	Sportpark De Boshoek	4,500
Koninklijke HFC	Haarlem	Sportpark Spanjaardslaan	1,500
IJsselmeervogels	Spakenburg	Sportpark De Westmaat	8,200
Jong Sparta	Rotterdam	Het Kasteel	11,000
Jong Volendam	Volendam	Kras Stadion	7,384
Katwijk	Katwijk	Sportpark De Krom	6,000
Kozakken Boys	Werkendam	Sportpark De Zwaaier	4,000
Noordwijk	Noordwijk	Sportpark Duin Wetering	6,100
Quick Boys	Katwijk aan Zee	Sportpark Nieuw Zuid	8,100
Rijnsburgse Boys	Rijnsburg	Sportpark Middelmors	6,100
Scheveningen	Scheveningen	Sportpark Houtrust	3,500
SV Spakenburg	Spakenburg	Sportpark De Westmaat	8,200
TEC	Tiel	Sportpark De Lok	2,500
De Treffers	Groesbeek	Sportpark Zuid	4,000

== Standings ==
>> As the competition was cancelled, below is the situation on 8 March 2020, the date the last matches were played. <<

Pos	Team	Pld	W	D	L	GF	GA	GD	Pts	Promotion, qualification or relegation
1	Katwijk (Note: Winner of the second period (games 13-23).)	24	15	4	5	48	26	+22	49	~~Champion~~
2	HHC Hardenberg	24	14	4	6	54	27	+27	46	
3	AFC	24	13	6	5	50	33	+17	45	
4	Rijnsburgse Boys	24	13	6	5	55	42	+13	45	
5	IJsselmeervogels (Note: Winner of the first period (games 1-12).)	24	13	5	6	57	37	+20	44	
6	Kozakken Boys	24	13	3	8	38	29	+9	42	
7	SV Spakenburg	24	10	7	7	37	44	−7	37	
8	Koninklijke HFC	23	10	5	8	43	36	+7	35	
9	De Treffers	24	9	8	7	42	36	+6	35	
10	Noordwijk	24	8	8	8	47	44	+3	32	
11	Jong Sparta	24	9	4	11	43	42	+1	31	
12	Excelsior Maassluis	24	9	4	11	36	47	−11	31	
13	GVVV	24	9	3	12	38	48	−10	30	
14	Quick Boys	24	7	6	11	25	32	−7	27	~~Qualification to relegation play-offs~~
15	Scheveningen	23	7	4	12	24	36	−12	25	~~Qualification to relegation play-offs~~
16	TEC	24	3	7	14	17	40	−23	16	~~Relegation to Derde Divisie~~
17	Jong Volendam	24	3	5	16	40	61	−21	14	~~Possible relegation to Derde Divisie~~ (Note: Team relegates only if in one (or both) Derde Divisie(s) at least one reserve team ends at rank 1 to 4.)
18	ASWH	24	3	5	16	26	60	−34	14	~~Relegation to Derde Divisie~~

Source: Soccerway
Rules for classification: Season in progress: 1) Most points won; 2) Less points lost; 3) Goal difference; 4) Goals scored; 5) Alphabetical order; End of season: 1) Points; 2) Goal difference; 3) Goals scored; 4) Head-to-head points; 5) Head-to-head goal difference; 6) Head-to-head away goals scored; 7) Play-off if relevant for deciding champion, relegation or participating in a European league, otherwise by draw. 8) Penalty shoot-out (only after a play-off)

== Fixtures/results ==
Home \ Away	AFC	ASW	EXM	GVV	HFC	HHC	IJS	JSP	JVO	KAT	KOZ	NOO	QUI	RIJ	SCH	SPA	TEC	TRE
AFC		4–0	3–1	1–1	0–0	0–1	2–0	2–1			2–0			6–3	0–1	2–0		2–2
ASWH			3–4	2–1		0–4	1–3		5–2			0–0	0–1	1–2	2–0	1–1	2–2	2–2
Excelsior Maassluis	2–3	1–0					1–3	1–2	3–2	1–4	1–0	0–1		3–3	2–0		0–0	1–1
GVVV	1–3	3–0	1–2		2–0		0–3		3–1	0–3		2–2		3–4	4–0	1–2		2–2
Koninklijke HFC		4–1	2–3			3–1		3–2	4–0	1–1			1–0	2–1		1–1	1–1	2–3
HHC Hardenberg	0–2		5–0	4–0	3–0					1–2	0–1	2–2	3–1	3–3	1–0	6–1	2–1	
IJsselmeervogels	5–1	4–1		3–0	1–5	1–2		4–2	3–3	0–3	0–0	4–2		1–1		2–2	5–1	
Jong Sparta		6–2		0–1	3–1	1–1	2–3				1–0	4–0	2–1		0–0	2–4	3–1	2–0
Jong Volendam	4–6	1–1	4–1		3–6	1–3		5–0		2–3	1–2				1–2	1–1	3–1	0–1
Katwijk	1–2	3–0	1–2	2–3		2–1	2–1	2–1				3–2	0–0		3–2		2–0	2–0
Kozakken Boys		3–0	2–0	4–2	0–2	2–4	1–3	2–1	2–1	0–0			1–1			4–2	0–1	
Noordwijk	2–2	5–1	1–3	1–3	4–1	2–0			5–1		2–5		1–1	3–3		0–3		4–1
Quick Boys	1–1		1–1	2–0			2–1	1–3	3–1		0–2	1–1		0–2	2–3	0–1	1–0	0–2
Rijnsburgse Boys	2–0		4–3	6–2	2–1			2–1	1–1	0–3	1–2	0–1	3–1				1–0	2–1
Scheveningen	1–0			0–1	0–0	0–3	0–1		2–1	0–2	3–1	1–4		2–5		5–0		1–1
SV Spakenburg	2–4	1–0	1–0			1–3		2–2	1–1	4–2		2–1	2–0	2–2			1–0	
TEC	2–2			1–2	0–2		0–3	1–1	2–0	1–0	0–2	1–1	0–2		1–1			
De Treffers		3–1			4–1	1–1	3–3	3–1		2–2	1–2		1–3	0–2	1–0	4–0	3–0	

Source: Soccerway
Legend: Blue = home team win; Yellow = draw; Red = away team win.
