= Sam van Huffel =

Dutch footballer (born 1998)

Personal information
- Date of birth: 24 June 1998 (age 28)
- Place of birth: Amsterdam, Netherlands
- Height: 1.76 m (5 ft 9 in)
- Position: Midfielder

Team information
- Current team: Spakenburg
- Number: 8

Youth career
- Legmeervogels
- 2016–2017: ADO Den Haag

Senior career*
Years	Team	Apps	(Gls)
2017–2019	Jong ADO	24	(5)
2019–2020	Koninklijke HFC	19	(4)
2020–2021	Stomil Olsztyn	38	(3)
2021–2023	Chojniczanka Chojnice	53	(7)
2023–	Spakenburg	105	(30)
- * Club domestic league appearances and goals as of 14 November 2026

Sam van Huffel (born 24 June 1998) is a Dutch professional footballer who plays as a midfielder for Tweede Divisie club Spakenburg.

== Career ==
=== ADO Den Haag ===
Van Huffel started his youth career with Legmeervogels before joining ADO Den Haag. He became a regular for Jong ADO in the second half of the 2017–18 season, starting in central midfield. He finished the season well scoring against RKC Waalwijk and Heracles Almelo.

He carried his good form into the start of the 2018–19 season, continuing to start in midfield alongside Johnny Reynolds. He scored against PEC Zwolle, forming good partnerships with Kyle Ebecilio and Chovanie Amatkarijo.

He made his final appearance for the club in a 4–2 defeat against Jong FC Twente on 29 April 2019.

=== Poland ===
After that, he played for Koninklijke HFC as a senior player. In 2020, he signed for Stomil Olsztyn in the Polish I liga.

On 28 June 2021, van Huffel moved to II liga club Chojniczanka Chojnice, signing a deal for the 2021–22 season.

=== Return to Holland ===
In June 2023, van Huffel agreed to join SV Spakenburg in the Tweede Divisie.

== Career statistics ==
As of match played 23 May 2026

Appearances and goals by club, season and competition
Club	Season	League			National cup		Continental		Other		Total	
Club	Season	Division	Apps	Goals	Apps	Goals	Apps	Goals	Apps	Goals	Apps	Goals
Jong ADO	2016–17	Beloften Eredivisie	3	0	0	0	0	0	0	0	3	0
Jong ADO	2017–18	Beloften Eredivisie	12	4	0	0	0	0	0	0	12	4
Jong ADO	2018–19	Beloften Eredivisie	9	1	0	0	0	0	0	0	9	1
Jong ADO	Total		24	5	0	0	0	0	0	0	24	5
ADO Den Haag	2018–19	Eredivisie	0	0	0	0	0	0	—		0	0
Koninklijke HFC	2019–20	Tweede Divisie	19	4	1	0	0	0	—		20	4
Stomil Olsztyn	2019–20	I liga	12	1	—		—		—		12	1
Stomil Olsztyn	2020–21	I liga	26	2	1	0	—		—		27	2
Stomil Olsztyn	Total		38	3	1	0	—		—		39	3
Chojniczanka Chojnice	2021–22	II liga	28	7	1	0	0	0	—		29	7
Chojniczanka Chojnice	2022–23	I liga	25	0	0	0	0	0	—		25	0
Chojniczanka Chojnice	Total		53	7	1	0	—		—		54	7
SV Spakenburg	2023–24	Tweede Divisie	25	7	2	1	0	0	—		27	8
SV Spakenburg	2024–25	Tweede Divisie	31	9	1	0	0	0	—		32	9
SV Spakenburg	2025–26	Tweede Divisie	34	11	2	1	0	0	—		36	12
Career total			224	46	8	2	0	0	0	0	232	48

== Honours ==
Spakenburg

- Tweede Divisie: 2023–24
