= Mukhtar Suleiman =

Somali footballer (born 1998)

Personal information
- Date of birth: 10 August 1998 (age 28)
- Place of birth: Hoorn, Netherlands
- Position: Forward

Team information
- Current team: Katwijk
- Number: 10

Youth career
- –2017: Always Forward

Senior career*
Years	Team	Apps	(Gls)
2017–2018	Always Forward		
2018–2019	Zwaluwen '30		
2019–2020	Hollandia	20	(15)
2020–2021	Oostzaan	5	(2)
2021–2023	Katwijk	65	(36)
2023–2025	Spakenburg	60	(23)
2025–	Katwijk	39	(8)

International career^{‡}
2022–	Somalia	14	(0)
- * Club domestic league appearances and goals as of 19:40, 19 October 2026 (UTC) ‡ National team caps and goals as of 29 September 2026

Mukhtar Suleiman (born 10 October 1998) is a Somali footballer who plays as a forward for Tweede Divisie club Katwijk, and the Somalia national team.

== Club career ==
Suleiman played in the lower leagues of the Netherlands, notably scoring fifteen goals for Hollandia before a move to Oostzaan.

On 7 December 2022, it was announced that Suleiman would join Tweede Divisie club Spakenburg from the 2023–24 season. He had a highly successful first season at the club, scoring 16 goals in 32 league appearances, helping Spakenburg to the league title; his third consecutive Tweede Divisie win, following two previous wins with Katwijk.

== International career ==
Suleiman was called up to the Somalia national football team in March 2022. He scored in a 3–1 friendly loss to Tanzanian club team Azam.

== Career statistics ==
=== Club ===
As of match played 11 April 2026

Appearances and goals by club, season and competition
Club	Season	League			KNVB Cup		Total	
Club	Season	Division	Apps	Goals	Apps	Goals	Apps	Goals
Hollandia	2019–20	Hoofdklasse	20	15	0	0	20	15
Oostzaan	2020–21	Derde Divisie	5	2	2	2	7	4
Katwijk	2021–22	Tweede Divisie	31	4	1	0	32	4
Katwijk	2022–23	Tweede Divisie	34	8	3	1	37	9
Katwijk	Total		65	12	4	1	69	13
Spakenburg	2023–24	Tweede Divisie	32	16	3	0	35	16
Spakenburg	2024–25	Tweede Divisie	28	5	0	0	28	5
Katwijk	2025–26	Tweede Divisie	26	2	2	1	28	3
Katwijk	Total		86	7	4	1	91	24
Career total			176	52	12	4	178	57

=== International ===
As of match played 31 March 2026

National team	Year	Apps	Goals
Somalia	2022	2	0
Somalia	2023	0	0
Somalia	2024	4	0
Somalia	2025	4	0
Somalia	2026	2	0
Total		12	0

== Honours ==
Katwijk

- Tweede Divisie: 2021–22, 2022–23

Spakenburg

- Tweede Divisie: 2023–24
