= 2023–24 Tweede Divisie =

Dutch football league season

Tweede Divisie
- Season: 2023–24
- Dates: 19 August 2023 – 25 May 2024
- Champions: Spakenburg
- Relegated: Kozakken Boys; Lisse
- Matches played: 306
- Goals scored: 966 (3.16 per match)
- Top goalscorer: Ahmed El Azzouti (25 goals)
- Biggest home win: Spakenburg 8–0 Noordwijk (6 April 2024)
- Biggest away win: Lisse 0–5 HHC Hardenberg (9 September 2023); Quick Boys 0–5 Noordwijk (11 November 2023); Scheveningen 0–5 Quick Boys (20 January 2024); Kozakken Boys 0–5 AFC (27 January 2024)
- Highest scoring: Lisse 4–7 Jong Sparta (16 September 2023)
- Longest winning run: 9 matches Spakenburg
- Longest unbeaten run: 19 matches Spakenburg
- Longest winless run: 13 matches Scheveningen; Kozakken Boys
- Longest losing run: 8 matches Scheveningen

The 2023–24 Tweede Divisie, known as Betnation Divisie for sponsorship reasons, season is the eighth edition of the Dutch third tier since ending its hiatus since the 1970–71 season and the 23rd edition using the Tweede Divisie name.

On 2 October 2017, representatives of amateur and professional football reached an agreement during the extraordinary general meeting of the Royal Dutch Football Association (KNVB) regarding the path to renewal of the football pyramid.

During the extraordinary general meeting of 7 June 2018, an agreement was reached on the number of allowed reserve teams (belofteteams) in each division. For the Tweede Divisie, there are two. It was also decided that only two reserve teams would compete in the Tweede Divisie, with the remaining reserve teams participating in the new Under 21 Eredivisie. This is accompanied by its own relegation system.

After two extensions of the non-existent promotion/relegation system (due to Tweede Divisie clubs not having the economic capacity to compete in a fully professional league) in 2022, a decision was made to suspend the mandatory promotion/relegation system between the Eerste Divisie and Tweede Divisie for the next five to ten seasons for standard teams. The suspension does not apply to reserve teams. During the general meeting on 24 June 2022, it was announced that a proposal would be put forth for an admission arrangement to the Eerste Divisie.

== Overview before the season ==
The league distinguishes between first team (standard team) of a football club and second team, also known as a reserve team or reserve squad (teams starting with "Jong"). For this season, there are two reserve teams playing in the Tweede Divisie, namely Jong Sparta and Jong Almere City FC.

For promotion, the following applies:

- If the lowest-ranked reserve team in the Eerste Divisie finishes in 19th or 20th place, a reserve team will be promoted directly from the Tweede Divisie if it finishes in first or second place.
- If the lowest-ranked reserve team in the Eerste Divisie finishes between 11th and 18th place, and a reserve team becomes the champion of the Tweede Divisie, a play-off match will take place for one spot in the Eerste Divisie.
- If the lowest-ranked reserve team in the Eerste Divisie finishes in the top ten, there will be no promotion or relegation between the Eerste Divisie and Tweede Divisie.

For relegation, the following applies:

- The two standard teams that, based solely on the first teams, finish in 14th and 15th place, will play a relegation playoff with the period champions of the Derde Divisie for one spot in the1 Tweede Divisie.
- The standard team that finishes 16th, based solely on the first teams, will be relegated to the Derde Divisie.
- If the lowest-ranked reserve team in the Tweede Divisie finishes in 17th or 18th place, it will be directly relegated to the Under 21 competition.
- If the lowest-ranked reserve team in the Tweede Divisie finishes between 10th and 16th place, it will play a playoff match against the champion of the Under 21 competition for one spot in the Tweede Divisie.
- If the lowest-ranked reserve team in the Tweede Divisie finishes in the top nine, there will be no promotion or relegation between the Tweede Divisie and the Under 21 competition.

== Teams ==
=== Team changes ===
Promoted from 2022–23 Derde Divisie	Promoted from 2022–23 Division 1 U21	Relegated to 2023-24 Derde Divisie	Relegated to 2023–24 Division 1 U21	Withdrawn
ACV; ADO '20; GVVV	Jong Almere City	IJsselmeervogels; TEC	Jong Volendam	OFC

Location of teams in the Tweede Divisie 2022-23
South Holland clubs in the 2022–23 Tweede Divisie

Club	Location	Venue	Capacity
ACV	Assen	Univé Sportpark	3,000
ADO '20	Heemskerk	Sportpark de Vlotter	6,000
AFC	Amsterdam	Sportpark Goed Genoeg	3,000
Excelsior Maassluis	Maassluis	Sportpark Dijkpolder	5,000
GVVV	Veenendaal	Sportpark Panhuis	4,500
HHC	Hardenberg	Sportpark De Boshoek	4,500
Koninklijke HFC	Haarlem	Sportpark Spanjaardslaan	1,500
Jong Almere City	Almere	Yanmar Stadion	4,501
Jong Sparta	Rotterdam	Het Kasteel	11,000
Katwijk	Katwijk	Sportpark De Krom	6,000
Kozakken Boys	Werkendam	Sportpark De Zwaaier	3,000
Lisse	Lisse	Sportpark Ter Specke	7,000
Noordwijk	Noordwijk	Sportpark Duin Wetering	3,500
Quick Boys	Katwijk aan Zee	Sportpark Nieuw Zuid	8,100
Rijnsburgse Boys	Rijnsburg	Sportpark Middelmors	6,100
Scheveningen	Scheveningen	Sportpark Houtrust	3,500
Spakenburg	Spakenburg	Sportpark De Westmaat	8,500
De Treffers	Groesbeek	Sportpark Zuid	4,000

=== Number of teams by province ===
Number of teams	Province	Team(s)
8	South Holland	Excelsior Maassluis, Jong Sparta, Katwijk, Lisse, Noordwijk, Quick Boys, Rijnsburgse Boys, Scheveningen
3	North Holland	ADO '20, AFC, Koninklijke HFC
2	Utrecht	GVVV, Spakenburg
1	Drenthe	ACV
1	Flevoland	Jong Almere City
1	Gelderland	De Treffers
1	North Brabant	Kozakken Boys
1	Overijssel	HHC

== Standings ==
Pos	Team	Pld	W	D	L	GF	GA	GD	Pts	Qualification or relegation
1	Spakenburg (C)	34	26	4	4	89	38	+51	82	
2	De Treffers	34	22	5	7	66	42	+24	71	
3	Quick Boys	34	18	8	8	69	47	+22	62	
4	Katwijk	34	19	2	13	62	49	+13	59	
5	AFC	34	16	9	9	63	47	+16	57	
6	GVVV	34	15	9	10	57	53	+4	54	
7	Jong Sparta	34	14	7	13	59	53	+6	49	
8	Jong Almere City	34	13	10	11	60	55	+5	49	
9	ACV	34	14	5	15	49	54	−5	47	
10	HHC Hardenberg	34	12	8	14	48	43	+5	44	
11	Koninklijke HFC	34	11	11	12	50	48	+2	44	
12	ADO '20	34	12	6	16	45	56	−11	42	
13	Rijnsburgse Boys	34	11	8	15	49	57	−8	41	
14	Noordwijk	34	8	15	11	43	52	−9	39	
15	Scheveningen	34	7	12	15	44	61	−17	33	
16	Excelsior Maassluis (O)	34	8	8	18	42	62	−20	32	Qualification for relegation play-offs
17	Kozakken Boys (R)	34	5	8	21	36	65	−29	23	Qualification for relegation play-offs
18	Lisse (R)	34	4	7	23	35	84	−49	19	Relegation to Derde Divisie

Source: Flashscore
Rules for classification: Season in progress: 1) Most points won; 2) Less points lost; 3) Goal difference; 4) Goals scored; 5) Alphabetical order; End of season: 1) Points; 2) Goal difference; 3) Goals scored; 4) Head-to-head points; 5) Head-to-head goal difference; 6) Head-to-head away goals scored; 7) Play-off if relevant for deciding champion, relegation or participating in a European league, otherwise by draw. 8) Penalty shoot-out (only after a play-off)
(C) Champions; (O) Play-off winners; (R) Relegated

== Fixtures and results ==
Home \ Away	ACV	ADO	AFC	EXM	GVV	HHC	HFC	JAL	JSP	KAT	KOZ	LIS	NOO	QUI	RIJ	SCH	SPA	TRE
ACV		2–2	0–2	3–1	3–0	1–3	0–0	1–0	4–2	3–1	1–2	2–0	1–1	1–0	2–1	0–3	1–2	2–3
ADO '20	1–2		3–0	3–0	2–2	3–0	1–4	1–1	1–5	2–1	4–2	1–2	1–1	1–1	0–1	4–1	1–2	0–2
AFC	3–0	2–0		2–2	3–1	2–2	1–3	4–1	3–1	3–2	2–1	4–0	1–3	0–3	1–1	1–1	1–3	1–1
Excelsior Maassluis	2–0	0–1	2–1		2–0	0–1	0–3	5–3	0–1	1–2	0–0	5–0	1–0	2–4	2–0	2–2	1–1	0–1
GVVV	3–1	2–1	3–0	2–1		2–1	2–2	0–0	2–2	2–4	2–1	2–2	2–1	0–1	1–4	1–0	2–3	1–1
HHC Hardenberg	3–0	1–0	1–2	1–0	0–1		3–2	1–0	2–0	1–2	0–0	1–1	1–0	1–3	3–3	3–4	2–0	1–3
Koninklijke HFC	2–4	3–0	0–2	1–2	0–1	1–1		0–2	1–1	2–0	1–1	1–4	2–2	1–1	4–0	1–0	2–1	0–2
Jong Almere City	3–1	4–1	1–5	2–1	3–3	1–0	1–1		1–1	0–1	1–1	6–1	3–1	2–0	0–2	4–1	2–2	1–3
Jong Sparta	3–1	0–1	0–0	2–2	0–3	0–3	4–1	2–0		0–2	1–0	3–1	0–0	2–2	2–1	1–2	1–2	0–1
Katwijk	2–0	4–2	2–0	2–1	0–2	1–0	3–1	1–3	3–4		3–2	3–1	2–2	0–1	3–0	0–2	1–4	0–1
Kozakken Boys	0–0	2–3	0–5	2–1	0–4	1–1	1–2	3–4	1–2	1–2		2–0	1–3	1–2	1–2	1–1	0–3	1–2
Lisse	0–1	0–1	0–1	1–1	2–2	0–5	2–1	1–1	4–7	1–5	2–1		1–3	0–2	1–2	0–2	1–3	0–2
Noordwijk	2–3	2–2	1–1	1–1	0–0	1–0	1–1	0–0	0–2	0–1	1–2	3–2		0–0	1–4	2–2	0–3	2–2
Quick Boys	0–3	1–0	2–5	5–0	4–1	3–2	1–2	4–1	3–1	2–0	1–1	3–0	0–5		2–2	5–1	1–1	2–4
Rijnsburgse Boys	1–1	0–1	1–1	5–0	1–2	2–1	0–2	1–2	1–4	0–3	2–1	1–1	2–3	1–1		0–0	4–3	2–4
Scheveningen	2–3	0–1	1–1	2–2	3–1	2–2	1–1	2–2	0–3	0–4	0–1	2–2	0–0	0–5	0–2		1–2	5–0
Spakenburg	2–1	3–0	0–2	4–2	4–1	1–0	2–1	4–3	3–1	2–2	3–1	3–1	8–0	5–1	2–0	2–0		3–0
De Treffers	2–1	3–0	5–1	4–0	1–4	1–1	1–1	0–2	2–1	3–0	4–1	2–1	0–1	1–3	2–0	2–1	1–3	

Source: Flashscore
Legend: Blue = home team win; Yellow = draw; Red = away team win.

== Play-offs ==
=== Tweede divisie promotion/relegation play-offs ===
8 teams (16th and 17th place in the Tweede Divisie and three teams each from the Derde Divisie A and Derde Divisie B) play for one spot in next season's Tweede Divisie.

==== Bracket ====
Quarterfinals
Genemuiden	0	5	5
TEC	1	1	2
Kozakken Boys	1	2	3(4)
Blauw Geel '38 (p)	2	1	3(5)
Excelsior Maassluis	1	3	4
Hercules	1	0	1
SteDoCo	1	1	2(5)
Harkemase Boys (p)	1	1	2(6)

Semifinals
Genemuiden (p)	3	4	7(4)
Blauw Geel '38	4	3	7(3)
Excelsior Maassluis	1	2	3
Harkemase Boys	1	1	2

Final
Genemuiden	1	0	1
Excelsior Maassluis	3	3	6

==== Quarterfinals ====
29 May 2024
20:00

Blauw Geel '38	2–1	Kozakken Boys

1 June 2024
15:00

Kozakken Boys	2–1 (a.e.t.)	Blauw Geel '38
Penalties
	4–5

3–3 on aggregate. Blauw Geel '38 won 5–4 on penalties

29 May 2024
20:00

TEC	1–0	Genemuiden

1 June 2024
14:30

Genemuiden	5–1	TEC

Genemuiden won 5–2 on aggregate.

29 May 2024
20:00

Harkemase Boys	1–1	SteDoCo

1 June 2024
14:30

SteDoCo	1–1 (a.e.t.)	Harkemase Boys
Penalties
	5–6

2–2 on aggregate. Harkemase Boys won 6–5 on penalties

29 May 2024
20:00

Hercules	1–1	Excelsior Maassluis

1 June 2024
14:30

Excelsior Maassluis	3–0	Hercules

Excelsior Maassluis won 4–1 on aggregate.

==== Semifinals ====
5 June 2024
20:00

Blauw Geel '38	4–3	Genemuiden

8 June 2024
15:30

Genemuiden	4–3 (a.e.t.)	Blauw Geel '38
Penalties
	4–3

7–7 on aggregate. Genemuiden won 4–3 on penalties

5 June 2024
20:00

Harkemase Boys	1–1	Excelsior Maassluis

8 June 2024
15:30

Excelsior Maassluis	2–1	Harkemase Boys

Excelsior Maassluis won 3–2 on aggregate.

==== Final ====
12 June 2024
20:00

Excelsior Maassluis	3–1	Genemuiden

15 June 2024
14:30

Genemuiden	0–3	Excelsior Maassluis

Excelsior Maassluis won 6–1 on aggregate.

== Statistics ==
=== Top scorers ===
As of 25 May 2024

Rank	Player	Club	Goals
1	(Netherlands) Ahmed El Azzouti	Spakenburg	25
2	(Netherlands) Rob van der Leij	HHC Hardenberg	22
3	(Netherlands) Nick Broekhuizen	Quick Boys	17
4	(Netherlands) Mukhtar Suleiman	Spakenburg	16
5	(Netherlands) Sem van Duijn	Quick Boys	15
5	(Netherlands) Fughill Zeldenrust	Rijnsburgse Boys	15
5	(Netherlands) Tijmen Wildeboer	Jong Almere City	15
5	(Netherlands) Ilias Latif	GVVV	15
9	(Netherlands) Tim Waterink	De Treffers	14
9	(Netherlands) Milan Zonneveld	ADO '20	14
