= Milan Zonneveld =

Dutch footballer (born 2003)

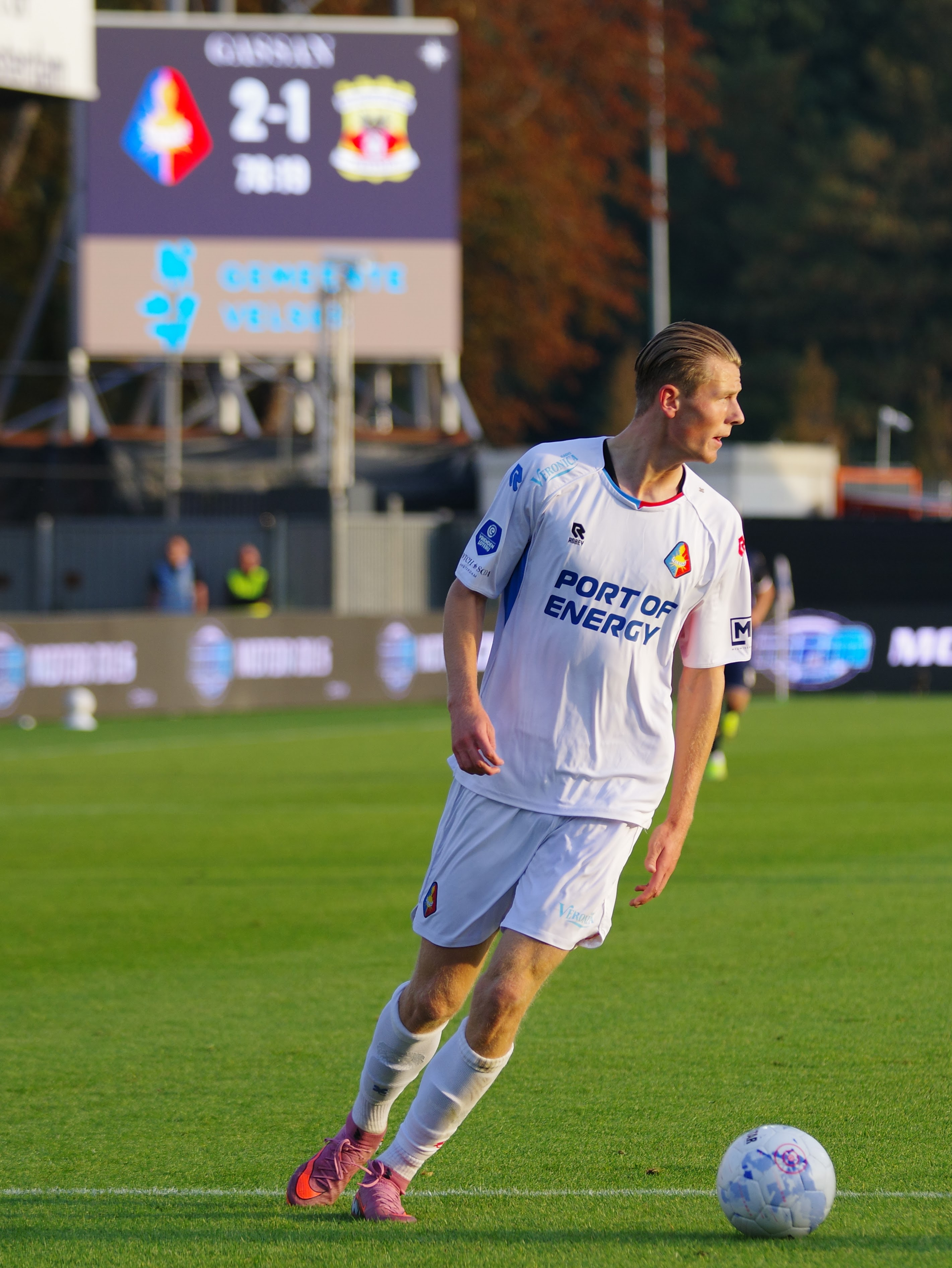
- Zonneveld with Telstar in 2025

Personal information
- Date of birth: 8 October 2003 (age 23)
- Place of birth: Beverwijk, Netherlands
- Height: 1.98 m (6 ft 6 in)
- Position: Striker

Team information
- Current team: Sparta Rotterdam
- Number: 19

Youth career
- 2008–2020: ADO '20
- 2020–2021: RKVV DEM

Senior career*
Years	Team	Apps	(Gls)
2020–2021	RKVV DEM	1	(0)
2021–2022	Jong Volendam	11	(3)
2021–2022	Volendam	1	(0)
2022–2024	ADO '20	63	(40)
2024–2025	Quick Boys	30	(13)
2025–2026	Telstar	20	(2)
2026–	Sparta Rotterdam	23	(11)
2026	Jong Sparta	1	(1)
- * Club domestic league appearances and goals as of 12:10, 13 November 2026 (UTC)

Milan Zonneveld (born 8 October 2003) is a Dutch professional footballer who plays as a striker for Eredivisie club Sparta Rotterdam.

== Career ==
=== Early years ===
Born in Beverwijk, Zonneveld grew up in Heemskerk and played youth football for ADO '20 and RKVV DEM before joining the academy of FC Volendam. On 17 March 2021 he signed his first professional contract with Volendam, and made his senior debut on 27 August 2021 in a 5–0 home win over MVV in the Eerste Divisie, replacing Calvin Twigt in the 80th minute Seeking regular minutes closer to home, he returned to amateur club ADO '20 in April 2022 and won the Derde Divisie Sunday title with the club the following year, scoring twice in the decisive match.

=== Quick Boys ===
On 2 January 2024, Zonneveld signed for Quick Boys on a contract until June 2025, with an option for a further two years. He scored in the KNVB Cup against top-flight opposition—Almere City, Fortuna Sittard and Heerenveen—and finished as joint top scorer in the 2024–25 main draw with four goals, alongside Ricardo Pepi and Ivan Perišić.

=== Telstar ===
On 21 May 2025, Zonneveld agreed to join Telstar. Days later, the club won promotion to the top flight via the play-offs, returning to the Eredivisie for the first time in 47 years.

He made his Eredivisie debut on 10 August 2025, starting in a 2–0 away defeat to Ajax at the Johan Cruyff Arena. On 28 September 2025, he registered two assists in a 4–2 home win over Go Ahead Eagles—Telstar's first home victory of the season. His first Telstar and Eredivisie goal followed on 19 October 2025, when he reduced the deficit in the 85th minute, heading in a Tyrese Noslin cross in a 3–2 home defeat to Heerenveen. On 29 October, he scored a hat-trick in a 5–0 KNVB Cup win away to FC Lisse, taking home the match ball as Telstar advanced to the next round.

=== Sparta Rotterdam ===
On 3 February 2026, Zonneveld signed a three-and-a-half-year contract with a one-year option with Eredivisie club Sparta Rotterdam.

== Personal life ==
While playing in the lower divisions, Zonneveld worked in the laboratory at the Tata Steel plant in IJmuiden, primarily taking samples and managing wastewater processes. He has described prioritising proximity to home, finishing his studies, and gaining playing time as factors behind his moves in the early stages of his career.

== Career statistics ==
As of match played 28 October 2026

Appearances and goals by club, season and competition
Club	Season	League			KNVB Cup		Other		Total	
Club	Season	Division	Apps	Goals	Apps	Goals	Apps	Goals	Apps	Goals
RKVV DEM	2020–21	Derde Divisie	1	0	0	0	—		1	0
Jong Volendam	2021–22	Tweede Divisie	11	3	—		2 (Note: Appearances in U21 promotion/relegation playoffs)	0	13	3
Volendam	2021–22	Eerste Divisie	1	0	0	0	—		1	0
ADO '20	2022–23	Derde Divisie	34	26	3	4	—		37	39
ADO '20	2023–24	Tweede Divisie	29	14	1	0	—		30	14
ADO '20	Total		63	40	4	4	—		67	44
Quick Boys	2024–25	Tweede Divisie	30	13	4	4	—		34	17
Telstar	2025–26	Eredivisie	20	2	3	5	—		23	7
Sparta Rotterdam	2025–26	Eredivisie	11	4	0	0	—		11	4
Sparta Rotterdam	2026–27	Eredivisie	12	7	1	2	—		13	9
Sparta Rotterdam	Total		23	11	1	2	—		24	13
Jong Sparta	2025–26	Tweede Divisie	1	1	—		—		1	1
Career total			150	70	12	15	2	0	164	85

== Honours ==
Quick Boys

- Tweede Divisie: 2024–25
