= Benjamin Reemst =

Dutch footballer

Personal information
- Date of birth: 29 March 2000 (age 26)
- Place of birth: Stavanger, Norway
- Position: Midfielder

Youth career
- –2011: Forum Sport
- 2011–2018: Feyenoord
- 2018–2021: ADO Den Haag

Senior career*
| Years | Team | Apps | (Gls) |
| 2021–2022 | ADO Den Haag | 10 | (0) |
| 2022–2024 | Dordrecht | 34 | (0) |
| 2024 | Haka | 11 | (0) |
| 2025 | Excelsior Maassluis | 8 | (1) |
| 2025–2026 | ASWH | 0 | (0) |
- * Club domestic league appearances and goals as of 14 June 2025

Benjamin Reemst (born 29 March 2000) is a Norway-Dutch footballer who plays as a midfielder for ASWH.

== Club career ==
=== Youth, ADO and Dordrecht ===
Reemst played at the youth levels of Forum Sport and Feyenoord, before making the move to ADO Den Haag in 2018. There, he became captain of the U-21 side. On 7 March 2022, he made his professional debut, playing 82 minutes in a 6–3 loss to Jong Ajax, in which he assisted Ricardo Kishna's goal.

After making a further 8 appearances for Den Haag, Reemst signed for FC Dordrecht on an initial two-year contract with an option of a further year. He made his debut for Dordrecht in a 2–0 loss to Roda JC. He did not play in the 2023–24 season due to an undisclosed injury.

=== Haka, Maassluis and ASWH ===
On 16 August 2024, Reemst signed with Finnish Veikkausliiga club Haka on a deal for the rest of the season with a one-year option.

On 30 January 2025, he signed for Excelsior Maassluis. Here he made his first official goal in a main league system. In June 2025, he signed with Hendrik-Ido-Ambacht-side ASWH.

== Career statistics ==
As of 23 October 2024.

Appearances and goals by club, season and competition
| Club | Season | League | | | Cup (Note: Includes KNVB Beker and Suomen Cup) | | Other | | Total | |
| Club | Season | Division | Apps | Goals | Apps | Goals | Apps | Goals | Apps | Goals |
|---|---|---|---|---|---|---|---|---|---|---|
| Jong ADO | 2019–20 | Derde Divisie | 14 | 0 | – | | – | | 14 | 0 |
| ADO Den Haag | 2021–22 | Eerste Divisie | 10 | 0 | 0 | 0 | – | | 10 | 0 |
| Dordrecht | 2022–23 | Eerste Divisie | 34 | 0 | 1 | 0 | – | | 35 | 0 |
| Dordrecht | 2023–24 | Eerste Divisie | 0 | 0 | 0 | 0 | – | | 0 | 0 |
| Dordrecht | Total | | 34 | 0 | 1 | 0 | 0 | 0 | 35 | 0 |
| Haka | 2024 | Veikkausliiga | 11 | 0 | 1 | 0 | 0 | 0 | 12 | 0 |
| Excelsior Maassluis | 2025 | Tweede Divisie | 0 | 0 | 0 | 0 | – | | 0 | 0 |
| Career total | | | 69 | 0 | 2 | 0 | 0 | 0 | 71 | 0 |
