= Dwayne Green =

Barbadian footballer (born 1996)

Personal information
- Full name: Dwayne Pascal Green
- Date of birth: 3 September 1996 (age 30)
- Place of birth: Gorinchem, Netherlands
- Height: 1.74 m (5 ft 9 in)
- Position: Left-back

Team information
- Current team: Spakenburg
- Number: 5

Youth career
- GJS
- 2010–2014: Den Bosch
- 2014–2016: Brabant United

Senior career*
Years	Team	Apps	(Gls)
2016–2018	RKC	3	(0)
2018–2020	Dordrecht	39	(3)
2020–2021	Den Bosch	27	(0)
2022–	Spakenburg	90	(4)

International career^{‡}
2021	Barbados	1	(0)
- * Club domestic league appearances and goals as of 28 August 2026 ‡ National team caps and goals as of 2 July 2021

Dwayne Pascal Green (born 3 September 1996) is a footballer who plays as a left-back for Tweede Divisie club Spakenburg. Born in the Netherlands, he represents Barbados internationally.

== Club career ==
He made his professional debut in the Eerste Divisie for RKC Waalwijk on 12 August 2016 in a game against FC Emmen. He joined FC Dordrecht on a two-year deal in the summer of 2018, with an option for a further year. After two years at Dordrecht, he signed for FC Den Bosch on a free transfer in the summer of 2020, signing a one-year contract with the club with the option for a second season.

On 2 May 2022, Green signed with Tweede Divisie club Spakenburg. On 4 April 2023, he started in the semi-finals of the KNVB Cup. In the 59th minute, he scored a long-range shot, becoming the first amateur player ever to score in the semi-finals of the KNVB Cup. In the 2023–24 season, Green featured as a key player as Spakenburg won the Tweede Divisie.

== International career ==
He made his debut for Barbados national football team on 2 July 2021 in a Gold Cup qualifier against Bermuda that Bermuda won 8–1.

== Personal life ==
Green was born in the Netherlands to a Barbadian father and Greek Cypriot mother.

== Honours ==
Spakenburg

- Tweede Divisie: 2023–24
