= 2024–25 Tweede Divisie =

Dutch football league season

Tweede Divisie
- Season: 2024–25
- Dates: 17 August 2024 – 24 May 2025
- Champions: Quick Boys (12th title)
- Relegated: Noordwijk; Scheveningen; ADO '20
- Top goalscorer: Mark van der Weijden (25 goals)

The 2024–25 Tweede Divisie season was the ninth edition of the Dutch third tier since ending its hiatus since the 1970–71 season and the 24th edition using the Tweede Divisie name.

On 2 October 2017, representatives of amateur and professional football reached an agreement during the extraordinary general meeting of the Royal Dutch Football Association (KNVB) regarding the path to renewal of the football pyramid.

During the extraordinary general meeting of 7 June 2018, an agreement was reached on the number of allowed reserve teams (belofteteams) in each division. For the Tweede Divisie, there are two. It was also decided that only two reserve teams would compete in the Tweede Divisie, with the remaining reserve teams participating in the new Under 21 Eredivisie. This is accompanied by its own relegation system.

After two extensions of the non-existent promotion/relegation system (due to Tweede Divisie club's not having the economic capacity to compete in a fully professional league) in 2022, a decision was made to suspend the mandatory promotion/relegation system between the Eerste Divisie and Tweede Divisie for the next five to ten seasons for standard teams. The suspension does not apply to reserve teams. During the general meeting on 24 June 2022, it was announced that a proposal would be put forth for an admission arrangement to the Eerste Divisie.

== Overview before the season ==
The league distinguishes between first team (standard team) of a football club and second team, also known as a reserve team or reserve squad (teams starting with "Jong"). For this season, there are two reserve teams playing in the Tweede Divisie, namely Jong Sparta and Jong Almere City.

For promotion, the following applies:

- If the lowest-ranked reserve team in the Eerste Divisie finishes in 19th or 20th place, a reserve team will be promoted directly from the Tweede Divisie if it finishes in first or second place.
- If the lowest-ranked reserve team in the Eerste Divisie finishes between 11th and 18th place, and a reserve team becomes the champion of the Tweede Divisie, a play-off match will take place for one spot in the Eerste Divisie.
- If the lowest-ranked reserve team in the Eerste Divisie finishes in the top ten, there will be no promotion or relegation between the Eerste Divisie and Tweede Divisie.

For relegation, the following applies:

- The two standard teams that, based solely on the first teams, finish in 14th and 15th place, will play a relegation playoff with the period champions of the Derde Divisie for one spot in the Tweede Divisie.
- The standard team that finishes 16th, based solely on the first teams, will be relegated to the Derde Divisie.
- If the lowest-ranked reserve team in the Tweede Divisie finishes in 17th or 18th place, it will be directly relegated to the Under 21 competition.
- If the lowest-ranked reserve team in the Tweede Divisie finishes between 10th and 16th place, it will play a playoff match against the champion of the Under 21 competition for one spot in the Tweede Divisie.
- If the lowest-ranked reserve team in the Tweede Divisie finishes in the top nine, there will be no promotion or relegation between the Tweede Divisie and the Under 21 competition.

== Teams ==
=== Team changes ===
Promoted from 2023–24 Derde Divisie	Relegated to 2024-25 Derde Divisie
Barendrecht; RKAV Volendam	Kozakken Boys; Lisse

Location of teams in the 2024-25 Tweede Divisie
South Holland clubs in the 2024–25 Tweede Divisie

Club	Location	Venue	Capacity
ACV	Assen	Univé Sportpark	3,000
ADO '20	Heemskerk	Sportpark de Vlotter	6,000
AFC	Amsterdam	Sportpark Goed Genoeg	3,000
Barendrecht	Barendrecht	Sportpark De Bongerd	1,500
Excelsior Maassluis	Maassluis	Sportpark Dijkpolder	5,000
GVVV	Veenendaal	Sportpark Panhuis	4,500
HHC	Hardenberg	Sportpark De Boshoek	4,500
Koninklijke HFC	Haarlem	Sportpark Spanjaardslaan	1,500
Jong Almere City	Almere	Yanmar Stadion	4,501
Jong Sparta	Rotterdam	Het Kasteel	11,000
Katwijk	Katwijk	Sportpark De Krom	6,000
Noordwijk	Noordwijk	Sportpark Duin Wetering	3,500
Quick Boys	Katwijk aan Zee	Sportpark Nieuw Zuid	8,100
Rijnsburgse Boys	Rijnsburg	Sportpark Middelmors	6,100
Scheveningen	Scheveningen	Sportpark Houtrust	3,500
Spakenburg	Spakenburg	Sportpark De Westmaat	8,500
De Treffers	Groesbeek	Sportpark Zuid	4,000
RKAV Volendam	Volendam	KWABO-stadion	6,500

=== Number of teams by province ===
Number of teams	Province	Team(s)
8	South Holland	Barendrecht, Excelsior Maassluis, Jong Sparta, Katwijk, Noordwijk, Quick Boys, Rijnsburgse Boys, Scheveningen
4	North Holland	ADO '20, AFC, Koninklijke HFC, RKAV Volendam
2	Utrecht	GVVV, Spakenburg
1	Drenthe	ACV
1	Flevoland	Jong Almere City
1	Gelderland	De Treffers
1	Overijssel	HHC

== Standings ==
Pos	Team	Pld	W	D	L	GF	GA	GD	Pts	Qualification or relegation
1	Quick Boys (C)	34	25	4	5	81	33	+48	79	
2	Rijnsburgse Boys	34	22	6	6	80	38	+42	72	
3	AFC	34	20	5	9	68	40	+28	65	
4	Katwijk	34	17	7	10	58	49	+9	58	
5	Spakenburg	34	17	6	11	66	44	+22	57	
6	Jong Almere City	34	16	8	10	88	53	+35	56	
7	GVVV	34	16	5	13	57	57	0	53	
8	Koninklijke HFC	34	14	10	10	43	37	+6	52	
9	Barendrecht	34	14	6	14	55	60	−5	48	
10	De Treffers	34	13	9	12	62	69	−7	48	
11	HHC Hardenberg	34	14	5	15	43	50	−7	47	
12	ACV	34	12	7	15	43	53	−10	43	
13	RKAV Volendam	34	12	5	17	62	74	−12	41	
14	Excelsior Maassluis	34	10	9	15	32	48	−16	39	
15	Noordwijk (R)	34	10	8	16	64	69	−5	38	Qualification for relegation play-offs
16	Jong Sparta (O)	34	12	2	20	65	76	−11	38	Qualification for U21 relegation play-offs
17	Scheveningen (R)	34	4	4	26	24	76	−52	16	Qualification for relegation play-offs
18	ADO '20 (R)	34	3	4	27	25	90	−65	13	Relegation to Derde Divisie

Source: Flashscore
Rules for classification: Season in progress: 1) Most points won; 2) Less points lost; 3) Goal difference; 4) Goals scored; 5) Alphabetical order; End of season: 1) Points; 2) Goal difference; 3) Goals scored; 4) Head-to-head points; 5) Head-to-head goal difference; 6) Head-to-head away goals scored; 7) Play-off if relevant for deciding champion, relegation or participating in a European league, otherwise by draw. 8) Penalty shoot-out (only after a play-off)
(C) Champions; (O) Play-off winners; (R) Relegated

== Results ==
Home \ Away	ACV	ADO	AFC	BAR	EXM	GVV	HHC	HFC	JAL	JSP	KAT	NOO	QUI	RIJ	SCH	SPA	TRE	VOL
ACV		2–0	3–2	0–1	0–1	2–0	0–1	0–2	3–3	3–0	5–1	1–6	1–2	1–1	1–0	1–2	0–1	1–2
ADO '20	0–1		1–3	1–1	0–4	1–2	0–2	0–1	1–3	1–4	0–1	0–3	0–2	0–5	3–0	1–6	0–3	3–3
AFC	1–1	3–0		2–2	1–1	2–1	4–0	2–2	2–0	2–0	1–4	2–1	2–0	3–1	5–0	1–0	1–1	2–1
Barendrecht	2–0	5–1	1–3		2–0	3–1	2–1	3–2	0–5	5–3	1–2	2–2	0–2	1–3	2–1	2–2	5–1	4–1
Excelsior Maassluis	1–1	2–0	0–2	1–2		0–1	1–0	0–0	0–2	0–3	1–1	1–1	0–2	1–0	2–1	3–1	0–2	1–0
GVVV	1–2	5–1	2–1	2–1	1–0		2–1	3–1	3–3	3–0	0–3	1–3	0–1	2–2	4–0	3–1	0–0	2–5
HHC Hardenberg	3–0	1–0	0–2	3–1	1–1	1–1		1–2	0–0	5–1	1–2	2–0	1–0	1–5	1–0	3–1	2–3	2–0
Koninklijke HFC	0–1	0–0	1–0	0–0	3–0	4–1	4–0		2–1	1–0	0–0	2–0	1–2	1–1	2–1	0–0	0–3	1–1
Jong Almere City	6–0	5–0	0–2	1–1	1–1	4–1	2–1	1–2		3–4	1–2	4–1	5–1	2–3	0–1	3–1	3–3	3–1
Jong Sparta	0–2	1–2	4–2	2–0	2–0	1–2	1–2	3–1	3–3		1–1	4–2	1–4	2–3	0–2	0–5	1–2	1–3
Katwijk	2–2	3–1	0–1	4–1	0–1	2–4	1–0	0–1	0–4	2–4		3–2	1–4	1–0	2–0	2–1	2–3	2–3
Noordwijk	1–2	1–1	3–2	1–2	2–2	0–1	1–3	3–1	1–4	4–2	3–3		0–5	1–2	2–0	2–2	4–0	4–2
Quick Boys	3–1	3–0	2–1	4–0	4–2	0–2	4–0	1–0	3–3	4–0	1–1	3–2		0–1	1–1	1–0	6–1	4–1
Rijnsburgse Boys	2–0	4–2	3–1	2–0	4–0	3–1	0–0	2–0	4–2	1–0	1–2	3–4	0–1		4–1	4–1	2–1	5–1
Scheveningen	1–2	3–0	0–3	0–1	1–0	0–2	1–2	1–1	1–4	0–8	0–3	2–2	1–3	0–3		0–1	1–2	0–2
Spakenburg	1–1	4–2	1–2	4–1	4–1	3–0	2–0	3–1	2–0	3–1	0–0	2–1	2–2	1–2	1–0		1–3	4–0
De Treffers	1–1	1–2	3–5	1–0	3–4	2–2	2–2	1–1	0–3	2–5	1–3	2–0	2–3	2–2	2–2	0–2		3–2
RKAV Volendam	3–2	3–1	1–0	2–1	0–0	4–1	4–0	2–3	3–4	1–3	0–2	1–1	0–3	2–2	5–2	1–2	2–5	

Source: Flashscore
Legend: Blue = home team win; Yellow = draw; Red = away team win.

== Play-offs ==
=== Tweede divisie promotion/relegation play-offs ===
8 teams (16th and 17th place in the Tweede Divisie and three teams each from the Derde Divisie A and Derde Divisie B) play for one spot in next season's Tweede Divisie.

==== Bracket ====
Quarterfinals
Kozakken Boys (p)	0	2	2 (8)
DOVO	2	0	2 (7)
Scheveningen	2	1	3
Sportlust '46	0	0	0
Harkemase Boys	3	2	5
Meerssen	0	0	0
Noordwijk	1	4	5
Blauw Geel '38	2	1	3

Semifinals
Kozakken Boys	0	1	1
Scheveningen	0	0	0
Harkemase Boys	2	1	3
Noordwijk	2	3	5

Final
Kozakken Boys	0	4	4
Noordwijk	1	0	1

===== Quarterfinals =====
28 May 2025
20:00

Sportlust '46	0–2	Scheveningen

Sportpark Cromwijck, Woerden
31 May 2025
14:30

Scheveningen	1–0	Sportlust '46

Houtrust Scheveningen, The Hague

Scheveningen won 3–0 on aggregate.

28 May 2025
20:00

DOVO	2–0	Kozakken Boys

Sportpark Panhuis, Veenendaal
31 May 2025
15:00

Kozakken Boys	2–0 (a.e.t.)	DOVO
Penalties
	8–7

De Zwaaier, Werkendam

2–2 on aggregate. Kozakken Boys won 8–7 on penalties

28 May 2025
20:00

Blauw Geel '38	2–1	Noordwijk

Prins Willem Alexander Sportpark, Veghel
31 May 2025
14:30

Noordwijk	4–1	Blauw Geel '38

Sportpark Duinwetering, Noordwijk

Noordwijk won 5–3 on aggregate.

28 May 2025
20:00

Meerssen	0–3	Harkemase Boys

Sportpark Marsana, Meerssen
31 May 2025
14:30

Harkemase Boys	2–0	Meerssen

De Bosk, Harkema

Harkemase Boys won 5–0 on aggregate.

===== Semifinals =====
4 June 2025
20:00

Scheveningen	0–0	Kozakken Boys

Houtrust Scheveningen, The Hague
7 June 2025
15:00

Kozakken Boys	1–0	Scheveningen

De Zwaaier, Werkendam

Kozakken Boys won 1–0 on aggregate.

4 June 2025
19:30

Noordwijk	2–2	Harkemase Boys

Sportpark Duinwetering, Noordwijk
7 June 2025
14:30

Harkemase Boys	1–3	Noordwijk

De Bosk, Harkema

Noordwijk won 5–3 on aggregate.

===== Final =====
11 June 2025
19:30

Noordwijk	1–0	Kozakken Boys

Sportpark Duinwetering, Noordwijk
14 June 2025
16:00

Kozakken Boys	4–0	Noordwijk

De Zwaaier, Werkendam

Kozakken Boys won 4–1 on aggregate.

=== U21 relegation play-offs ===
Since the lowest ranked reserve ("Jong") team (Sparta Rotterdam) finished 16th, there will be a playoff match between Jong Sparta Rotterdam and the winner of the U-21 Divisie 1 for a spot in next season's Tweede Divisie.

==== U21 Championship ====
31 May 2025
18:00

Feyenoord U21	4–1	Cambuur U21
De Bie 33', 36'; Sliti 38'; Candelaria 56'	Report	9' Van der Veen

Sportcomplex Varkenoord, Rotterdam

==== Tweede Divisie playoff ====
3 June 2025
19:30

Feyenoord U21	0–3	Jong Sparta Rotterdam
	Report	2' Triep; 3' Santos; 20' Seedorf

Sportcomplex Varkenoord, Rotterdam
7 June 2025
19:30

Jong Sparta Rotterdam	1–3	Feyenoord U21
van Wageningen 88'	Report	28' de Bie; 54' Rust 59' Ouarghi

Het Kasteel, Rotterdam

Jong Sparta Rotterdam won 5–3 on aggregate, therefore both teams will remain in their respective divisions.
