= Koen Wesdorp =

Dutch footballer (born 1997)

Personal information
- Date of birth: 9 November 1997 (age 29)
- Place of birth: Bergen op Zoom, Netherlands
- Position: Midfielder

Team information
- Current team: Spakenburg
- Number: 14

Youth career
- MOC '17
- –2008: RBC Roosendaal
- 2008–2016: NAC Breda
- 2016–2018: Willem II

Senior career*
Years	Team	Apps	(Gls)
2018–2019	Helmond Sport	15	(0)
2019–2021	ASWH	24	(4)
2021–2022	AFC	13	(0)
2022–	Spakenburg	65	(2)
- * Club domestic league appearances and goals as of 11:44, 5 June 2024 (UTC)

Koen Wesdorp (born 9 November 1997) is a Dutch footballer who plays as a midfielder for Tweede Divisie club Spakenburg.

== Club career ==
He made his Eerste Divisie debut for Helmond Sport on 31 August 2018 in a game against Jong PSV, as a starter.

On 2 September 2019, Wesdorp joined ASWH.

Wesdorp signed with Tweede Divisie club Spakenburg on 1 May 2022.

== Honours ==
Spakenburg

- Tweede Divisie: 2023–24
