= 2025–26 Tweede Divisie =

Dutch football league season

Tweede Divisie
- Season: 2025–26
- Dates: 16 August 2025 – 23 May 2026
- Champions: Quick Boys
- Relegated: ACV; Excelsior Maassluis
- Matches: 306
- Goals: 1,023 (3.34 per match)

The 2025–26 Tweede Divisie season is the tenth edition of the Dutch third tier since ending its hiatus since the 1970–71 season and the 25th edition using the Tweede Divisie name.

On 2 October 2017, representatives of amateur and professional football reached an agreement during the extraordinary general meeting of the Royal Dutch Football Association (KNVB) regarding the path to renewal of the football pyramid.

During the extraordinary general meeting of 7 June 2018, an agreement was reached on the number of allowed reserve teams (belofteteams) in each division. For the Tweede Divisie, there are two. It was also decided that only two reserve teams would compete in the Tweede Divisie, with the remaining reserve teams participating in the new Under 21 Eredivisie. This is accompanied by its own relegation system.

After two extensions of the non-existent promotion/relegation system (due to Tweede Divisie clubs not having the economic capacity to compete in a fully professional league) in 2022, a decision was made to suspend the mandatory promotion/relegation system between the Eerste Divisie and Tweede Divisie for the next five to ten seasons for standard teams. The suspension does not apply to reserve teams. During the general meeting on 24 June 2022, it was announced that a proposal would be put forth for an admission arrangement to the Eerste Divisie.

== Overview before the season ==
The league distinguishes between first teams (standard team) of a football club and second teams, also known as a reserve team or reserve squad (teams starting with "Jong"). For this season, there are two reserve teams playing in the Tweede Divisie, namely Jong Sparta and Jong Almere City.

For promotion, the following applies:

- If the lowest-ranked reserve team in the Eerste Divisie finishes in 19th or 20th place, a reserve team will be promoted directly from the Tweede Divisie if it finishes in first or second place.
- If the lowest-ranked reserve team in the Eerste Divisie finishes between 11th and 18th place, and a reserve team becomes the champion of the Tweede Divisie, a play-off match will take place for one spot in the Eerste Divisie.
- If the lowest-ranked reserve team in the Eerste Divisie finishes in the top ten, there will be no promotion or relegation between the Eerste Divisie and Tweede Divisie.

For relegation, the following applies:

- The two standard teams that, based solely on the first teams, finish in 14th and 15th place, will play a relegation playoff with the period champions of the Derde Divisie for one spot in the Tweede Divisie.
- The standard team that finishes 16th, based solely on the first teams, will be relegated to the Derde Divisie.
- If the lowest-ranked reserve team in the Tweede Divisie finishes in 17th or 18th place, it will be directly relegated to the Under 21 competition.
- If the lowest-ranked reserve team in the Tweede Divisie finishes between 10th and 16th place, it will play a playoff match against the champion of the Under 21 competition for one spot in the Tweede Divisie.
- If the lowest-ranked reserve team in the Tweede Divisie finishes in the top nine, there will be no promotion or relegation between the Tweede Divisie and the Under 21 competition.

== Teams ==
=== Team changes ===
Promoted from 2024–25 Derde Divisie	Relegated to 2025-26 Derde Divisie
Hoek; IJsselmeervogels; Kozakken Boys	ADO '20; Noordwijk; Scheveningen

Location of teams in the 2025-26 Tweede Divisie
South Holland clubs in the 2025–26 Tweede Divisie

Club	Location	Venue	Capacity
ACV	Assen	Univé Sportpark	3,000
AFC	Amsterdam	Sportpark Goed Genoeg	3,000
Barendrecht	Barendrecht	Sportpark De Bongerd	1,500
Excelsior Maassluis	Maassluis	Sportpark Dijkpolder	5,000
GVVV	Veenendaal	Sportpark Panhuis	4,500
HHC	Hardenberg	Sportpark De Boshoek	4,500
Koninklijke HFC	Haarlem	Sportpark Spanjaardslaan	1,500
Hoek	Hoek	Sportpark Denoek	2,500
IJsselmeervogels	Spakenburg	Sportpark De Westmaat	8,500
Jong Almere City	Almere	Yanmar Stadion	4,501
Jong Sparta	Rotterdam	Het Kasteel	11,000
Katwijk	Katwijk	Sportpark De Krom	6,000
Kozakken Boys	Werkendam	Sportpark De Zwaaier	3,000
Quick Boys	Katwijk aan Zee	Sportpark Nieuw Zuid	8,100
Rijnsburgse Boys	Rijnsburg	Sportpark Middelmors	6,100
Spakenburg	Spakenburg	Sportpark De Westmaat	8,500
De Treffers	Groesbeek	Sportpark Zuid	4,000
RKAV Volendam	Volendam	KWABO-stadion	6,500

=== Number of teams by province ===
Number of teams	Province	Team(s)
6	South Holland	Barendrecht, Excelsior Maassluis, Jong Sparta, Katwijk, Quick Boys, Rijnsburgse Boys
3	North Holland	AFC, Koninklijke HFC, RKAV Volendam
3	Utrecht	GVVV, IJsselmeervogels, Spakenburg
1	Drenthe	ACV
1	Flevoland	Jong Almere City
1	Gelderland	De Treffers
1	North Brabant	Kozakken Boys
1	Overijssel	HHC
1	Zeeland	Hoek

== Standings ==
Pos	Team	Pld	W	D	L	GF	GA	GD	Pts	Qualification or relegation
1	Quick Boys (Note: Quick Boys were deducted 1 point for unsportsmanlike behavior.) (C)	34	19	10	5	69	35	+34	66	
2	Hoek	34	20	5	9	60	36	+24	65	
3	De Treffers	34	18	8	8	63	37	+26	62	
4	Spakenburg	34	17	8	9	71	57	+14	59	
5	Rijnsburgse Boys	34	16	8	10	76	55	+21	56	
6	HHC Hardenberg	34	17	5	12	58	44	+14	56	
7	Katwijk	34	15	7	12	60	55	+5	52	
8	Jong Almere City	34	15	5	14	70	62	+8	50	
9	Kozakken Boys	34	13	8	13	47	55	−8	47	
10	Jong Sparta	34	12	9	13	71	73	−2	45	Qualification for U21 relegation play-offs
11	AFC	34	12	9	13	46	54	−8	45	
12	Barendrecht	34	13	4	17	62	84	−22	43	
13	RKAV Volendam	34	13	3	18	50	62	−12	42	
14	GVVV	34	12	6	16	52	67	−15	42	
15	Koninklijke HFC	34	11	3	20	30	48	−18	36	
16	IJsselmeervogels (O)	34	9	4	21	46	65	−19	31	Qualification for relegation play-offs
17	Excelsior Maassluis (R)	34	8	7	19	39	58	−19	31	Qualification for relegation play-offs
18	ACV (R)	34	7	9	18	48	71	−23	30	Relegation to Derde Divisie

Source: Flashscore
Rules for classification: Season in progress: 1) Most points won; 2) Less points lost; 3) Goal difference; 4) Goals scored; 5) Alphabetical order; End of season: 1) Points; 2) Goal difference; 3) Goals scored; 4) Head-to-head points; 5) Head-to-head goal difference; 6) Head-to-head away goals scored; 7) Play-off if relevant for deciding champion, relegation or participating in a European league, otherwise by draw. 8) Penalty shoot-out (only after a play-off)
(C) Champions; (O) Play-off winners; (R) Relegated

== Results ==
Home \ Away	ACV	AFC	BAR	EXM	GVV	HHC	HFC	HOE	IJS	JAL	JSP	KAT	KOZ	QUI	RIJ	SPA	TRE	VOL
ACV		0–1	1–5	3–1	2–1	0–2	1–0	0–1	2–2	0–4	1–2	3–3	1–2	1–2	3–3	2–2	4–1	1–2
AFC	1–1		3–1	3–2	0–2	2–3	1–2	1–5	1–0	0–0	1–4	2–2	2–2	0–2	3–2	2–0	1–0	3–1
Barendrecht	4–3	2–0		1–2	1–2	4–1	2–0	4–2	2–4	4–3	3–2	2–3	0–1	0–6	2–2	0–3	2–2	2–1
Excelsior Maassluis	2–0	1–1	2–0		0–2	4–0	0–0	3–1	0–4	0–1	1–3	0–0	1–2	1–2	1–2	3–1	0–1	3–0
GVVV	2–2	1–1	1–2	1–1		1–2	2–1	1–3	3–1	0–4	3–0	1–0	3–2	1–1	2–1	1–1	3–3	1–3
HHC Hardenberg	0–0	4–1	3–0	4–0	3–2		2–0	1–3	4–0	3–1	0–2	1–1	3–3	1–2	1–3	1–1	1–0	2–1
Koninklijke HFC	1–1	2–1	1–2	1–0	2–0	1–0		2–1	1–0	2–1	2–1	0–2	0–1	1–1	1–2	3–2	0–1	3–0
Hoek	2–1	2–2	1–1	3–1	0–1	1–0	2–0		2–1	4–0	0–0	2–0	1–2	1–1	2–0	1–1	2–1	1–0
IJsselmeervogels	2–4	0–2	1–3	0–0	0–3	2–0	3–0	2–1		3–0	1–3	2–3	0–2	0–3	2–2	0–2	2–0	2–3
Jong Almere City	2–4	2–1	3–3	1–1	5–4	1–3	2–1	1–2	3–2		3–0	3–0	3–1	1–4	5–1	4–2	2–3	3–2
Jong Sparta	3–0	3–0	4–1	0–4	5–2	2–2	4–1	1–4	4–0	2–2		2–2	1–1	4–4	2–4	4–4	1–4	1–5
Katwijk	3–2	0–1	4–3	3–2	2–1	0–2	4–0	0–1	3–0	3–0	4–1		2–1	1–2	3–2	2–2	2–4	1–2
Kozakken Boys	0–2	1–3	1–0	1–1	3–1	1–0	3–2	1–3	4–3	0–3	1–4	0–0		1–2	1–3	1–2	0–2	0–0
Quick Boys	1–0	1–1	1–3	2–1	6–0	1–0	0–1	2–0	2–2	2–1	5–1	3–0	1–1		0–0	5–2	0–2	1–0
Rijnsburgse Boys	1–1	3–0	5–1	5–0	5–0	0–4	2–0	1–0	1–3	2–1	4–2	1–3	1–0	1–1		1–2	2–2	7–0
Spakenburg	4–0	2–1	8–0	2–0	3–2	2–3	3–2	1–3	1–0	1–0	1–1	2–1	3–4	3–1	3–2		0–5	3–4
De Treffers	6–2	1–1	3–0	4–1	2–0	1–2	1–0	2–2	1–0	1–1	2–1	4–1	1–2	1–1	1–1	0–0		1–0
RKAV Volendam	3–0	0–3	5–2	4–0	0–2	1–0	1–0	2–1	0–2	1–4	1–1	1–2	1–1	2–1	3–4	1–3	0–1	

Source: Flashscore
Legend: Blue = home team win; Yellow = draw; Red = away team win.

== Play-offs ==
=== Tweede divisie promotion/relegation play-offs ===
8 teams (16th and 17th place in the Tweede Divisie and three teams each from the Derde Divisie A and Derde Divisie B) play for one spot in next season's Tweede Divisie.

==== Bracket ====
Quarterfinals
IJsselmeervogels	3	2	5
Sparta Nijkerk	0	1	1
Lisse	0	0	0
ADO '20	2	1	3
Excelsior Maassluis	1	3	4
VVSB	1	0	1
DVS '33	0	2	2
Rijnvogels	1	2	3

Semifinals
IJsselmeervogels	7	1	8
ADO '20	0	0	0
Excelsior Maassluis (p)	1	2	3 (5)
Rijnvogels	2	1	3 (4)

Final
IJsselmeervogels	1	2	3
Excelsior Maassluis	2	0	2

===== Quarterfinals =====
27 May 2026
20:00

ADO '20	2−0	Lisse
Helder 35', 70'

Sportpark De Vlotter, Heemskerk
30 May 2026
14:30

Lisse	0−1	ADO '20
		Helder 34'

Ter Specke, Lisse

ADO '20 won 3–0 on aggregate.

27 May 2026
20:00

Rijnvogels	1−0	DVS '33
Kaabouni 90+2'	Report

Sportpark de Kooltuin, Katwijk
Referee: Daan Schaper
30 May 2026
15:00

DVS '33	2−2	Rijnvogels
Müller 25'; Van Hilten 33'		Assendelft 66'; Kaabouni 84'

Sportpark Zuid, Ermelo

Rijnvogels won 3–2 on aggregate.

27 May 2026
20:00

Sparta Nijkerk	0−3	IJsselmeervogels
	Report	Dkidak 38'; Ignacio 77'; Ruizendaal 83'

De Ebbenhorst, Nijkerk
Attendance: Andy Wolff
30 May 2026
15:00

IJsselmeervogels	2−1	Sparta Nijkerk
Van Bohenen 33'; Beers 51'		Veenstra 87'

Sportpark De Westmaat, Spakenburg

IJsselmeervogels won 5–1 on aggregate.

27 May 2026
20:00

VVSB	1−1	Excelsior Maassluis
Owobowale 85'	Report	Ringeling 43'

Sportpark De Boekhorst, Noordwijkerhout
Referee: Robin Vereijken
30 May 2026
14:30

Excelsior Maassluis	3−0	VVSB
Van Eerden 1'; Slagveer 45'; Verbont 78'

Sportpark Dijkpolder, Maassluis

Excelsior Maassluis won 4–1 on aggregate.

===== Semifinals =====
3 June 2026
20:00

ADO '20	0−7	IJsselmeervogels
		Beers 7', 39'; Dkidak 50', 67'; Schulte 60'; Ignacio 78'; Butter 82'

Sportpark De Vlotter, Heemskerk
6 June 2026
15:00

IJsselmeervogels	1–0	ADO '20
Dkidak 51'

Sportpark De Westmaat, Spakenburg

IJsselmeervogels won 8–0 on aggregate.

3 June 2026
20:00

Rijnvogels	2−1	Excelsior Maassluis
Van der Meer 45' (pen.), 74'		Wennekers 35'

Sportpark de Kooltuin, Katwijk
6 June 2026
14:30

Excelsior Maassluis	2−1 (a.e.t.)	Rijnvogels
Ringeling 18'; Tavares 42'		Van der Meer 89'
Penalties
Plank (penalty missed); Wennekers (penalty missed); Verbont (penalty scored); Van Eerden (penalty scored); Ringeling (penalty scored); Heuvelman (penalty scored); Van der Kleij (penalty scored)	5−4	(penalty missed) Van der Meer; (penalty missed) Gomez-Nieto; (penalty scored) Charai; (penalty scored) Mercera; (penalty scored) Roffelsen; (penalty scored) Van de Riet; (penalty missed) Scholten

Sportpark Dijkpolder, Maassluis

3–3 on aggregate. Excelsior Maassluis won 5–4 on penalties.

===== Final =====
10 June 2026
20:00

Excelsior Maassluis	2–1	IJsselmeervogels
Madi 27'; Ringeling 90+5'		Dkidak 62'

Sportpark Dijkpolder, Maassluis
Attendance: 2,000
Referee: Luuk Timmer
14 June 2026
15:00

IJsselmeervogels	2–0 (a.e.t.)	Excelsior Maassluis
van Bohemen 32'; Kuisch 103'

Sportpark De Westmaat, Spakenburg
Attendance: 3,000
Referee: Pieter van Veelen

IJsselmeervogels won 3–2 on aggregate.

=== U21 relegation play-offs ===
==== U21 Championship ====
3 June 2026
19:00

Groningen U21	3–1	De Graafschap U21

==== Tweede Divisie playoff ====
6 June 2026
19:00

Groningen U21	1–1	Jong Sparta

10 June 2026
18:30

Jong Sparta	3–1	Groningen U21

Jong Sparta won 4–2 on aggregate.
