= Jeffry Puriel =

Bonaire footballer (born 2002)

Personal information
- Full name: Jeffry Germain Puriel
- Date of birth: 16 November 2002 (age 23)
- Place of birth: Amsterdam, Netherlands
- Height: 1.95 m (6 ft 5 in)
- Position: Winger

Team information
- Current team: Tolmin

Youth career
- 2010–2012: Sporting Almere
- 2012–2020: Almere City

Senior career*
| Years | Team | Apps | (Gls) |
| 2020–2025 | Almere City | 35 | (4) |
| 2023–2025 | Jong Almere City | 51 | (6) |
| 2025–2026 | Spakenburg | 22 | (0) |
| 2026– | Tolmin | 0 | (0) |

International career^{‡}
| 2024 | Bonaire | 2 | (0) |
- * Club domestic league appearances and goals as of 15:37, 21 September 2026 (UTC) ‡ National team caps and goals as of 9 September 2024

Jeffry Germain Puriel (born 16 November 2002) is a footballer who plays as a winger for Slovenian Third League club Tolmin. Born in the Netherlands, he represents the Bonaire national team.

== Club career ==
Puriel was born on 16 November 2002 in Amsterdam, Netherlands. He has regarded Belgium international Eden Hazard and Argentina international Lionel Messi as his football idols. As a youth player, he joined the youth academy of Dutch side Sporting Almere. He left the club at the age of nine. In 2012, he joined the youth academy of Dutch side Almere City. He started his senior career with the club. On 15 November 2020, he debuted for the club during a 2–7 loss to Cambuur.

On 18 July 2025, Puriel joined Tweede Divisie club Spakenburg.

In the summer of 2026, Puriel moved to Slovenian Third League club Tolmin.

== International career ==
Puriel is a Bonaire international. He played for the Bonaire national football team at the CONCACAF Nations League. On 6 September 2024, he debuted for the Bonaire national football team during a 1–1 draw with the Saint Vincent and the Grenadines national football team.

== Style of play ==
Puriel mainly operates as a winger. He can operate as a left-winger or as a right-winger. He is right-footed. He is known for his speed. He is also known for his dribbling ability and agility.
