= Tim Linthorst =

Dutch footballer (born 1994)

Personal information
- Date of birth: 10 May 1994 (age 32)
- Place of birth: Apeldoorn, Netherlands
- Height: 1.94 m (6 ft 4 in)
- Position: Centre-back

Team information
- Current team: Spakenburg
- Number: 18

Youth career
- –2005: AGOVV
- 2005–2013: Vitesse

Senior career*
Years	Team	Apps	(Gls)
2015–2017	De Graafschap	21	(0)
2017–2018	Berliner AK 07	26	(0)
2018–2025	AFC	130	(10)
2025–	Spakenburg	35	(0)
- * Club domestic league appearances and goals as of 08:43, 20 November 2026 (UTC)

Tim Linthorst (born 10 May 1994) is a Dutch professional footballer who plays as a centre back for Tweede Divisie club Spakenburg.
