= Sportpark Duinwetering =

Sports complex in the Netherlands

- Interactive map of Sportpark Duinwetering
- Location: Noordwijk, Netherlands
- Capacity: 3,500 (main field)
- Surface: Grass, Artificial Turf

Tenants
- VV Noordwijk

Sportpark Duinwetering is a sports complex located in Noordwijk, Netherlands. There are six Association football fields on the complex.

== Main field ==
The main field at Sportpark Duinwetering is home to Tweede Divisie side VV Noordwijk. The field is made of artificial turf and has a capacity of 3,500.

The field hosted Noordwijk's 3-2 win over Sparta Rotterdam in the 2018–19 KNVB Cup first round, with an attendance of 5,900.
