= Des Kunst =

Dutch footballer (born 1999)

Personal information
- Date of birth: 12 October 1999 (age 27)
- Place of birth: IJmuiden, Netherlands
- Height: 1.89 m (6 ft 2 in)
- Position: Forward

Team information
- Current team: Spakenburg
- Number: 10

Youth career
- AZ

Senior career*
Years	Team	Apps	(Gls)
2016–2021	Jong AZ	53	(11)
2021–2023	Varbergs BoIS	21	(0)
2023–2025	Katwijk	76	(20)
2025–	Spakenburg	31	(4)
- * Club domestic league appearances and goals as of 14:51, 25 July 2026 (UTC)

Des Kunst (born 12 October 1999) is a Dutch football player who plays as a forward for Tweede Divisie club Spakenburg.

== Club career ==
He made his Jong AZ debut in the Tweede Divisie, and then, after promotion he made his Eerste Divisie debut on 26 October 2018 in a game against Roda JC Kerkrade, as an 80th-minute substitute for Mees Hoedemakers.

On 12 January 2023, after a two-year stint with Allsvenskan club Varbergs BoIS, Kunst returned to the Netherlands where he signed a two-year contract with Tweede Divisie club Katwijk.

On 30 May 2025, Kunst joined Tweede Divisie club Spakenburg on a two-year contract.

== Honours ==
Katwijk

- Tweede Divisie: 2021–22, 2022–23
