= 2016–17 Tweede Divisie =

Tweede Divisie
- Season: 2016–17
- Champions: Jong AZ
- Promoted: Jong AZ
- Relegated: Jong Twente; Jong Vitesse; UNA; Spakenburg

The 2016–17 Tweede Divisie football season was the first edition of the Dutch third tier since its initial dissolution from the 1970-71 season and the fifteenth overall using "Tweede Divisie" name. Fourteen teams were completed from the Topklasse Saturday and Sunday divisions. Seven highest-placed teams of each division earned promotion to constitute a new, amateur Tweede Divisie. This change in the league system was approved in a KNVB assembly in December 2014. Thus, the Topklasse and leagues below it decremented by one level, and promotion and relegation between the Tweede Divisie and the Topklasse were implemented.

== Teams ==
Location of teams in the Tweede Divisie 2016-17

Club	City	2015–16 season
Excelsior Maassluis	Maassluis	Top 7 in Topklasse Saturday
HHC	Hardenberg	Top 7 in Topklasse Saturday
Katwijk	Katwijk	Top 7 in Topklasse Saturday
Kozakken Boys	Werkendam	Top 7 in Topklasse Saturday
Barendrecht	Barendrecht	Top 7 in Topklasse Saturday
Spakenburg	Bunschoten-Spakenburg	Top 7 in Topklasse Saturday
GVVV	Veenendaal	Top 7 in Topklasse Saturday
Lienden	Lienden	Top 7 in Topklasse Sunday
TEC	Tiel	Top 7 in Topklasse Sunday
VVSB	Noordwijkerhout	Top 7 in Topklasse Sunday
Koninklijke HFC	Haarlem	Top 7 in Topklasse Sunday
De Treffers	Groesbeek	Top 7 in Topklasse Sunday
AFC	Amsterdam	Top 7 in Topklasse Sunday
UNA	Veldhoven	Top 7 in Topklasse Sunday
Jong AZ	Wijdewormer	3rd in Beloften Eredivisie
Jong Twente	Hengelo	6th in Beloften Eredivisie
Jong Sparta	Rotterdam	4th in Beloften Eredivisie
Jong Vitesse	Arnhem	2nd in Beloften Eredivisie

== League standings ==
Pos	Team	Pld	W	D	L	GF	GA	GD	Pts	Promotion, qualification or relegation
1	Jong AZ (C, P)	34	23	7	4	85	29	+56	76	Promotion to Eerste Divisie
2	Kozakken Boys	34	17	6	11	70	54	+16	57	
3	Katwijk	34	15	10	9	52	42	+10	55	
4	De Treffers	34	14	12	8	70	55	+15	54	
5	Excelsior Maassluis	34	13	10	11	52	43	+9	49	
6	Lienden	34	13	9	12	52	48	+4	48	
7	Jong Sparta	34	12	11	11	74	67	+7	47	
8	Barendrecht	34	12	11	11	57	57	0	47	
9	VVSB	34	12	11	11	62	64	−2	47	
10	GVVV	34	13	8	13	51	63	−12	47	
11	AFC (Note: AFC were deducted 1 point for not having the required number of players with a contract.)	34	13	7	14	59	63	−4	45	
12	TEC	34	13	6	15	53	67	−14	45	
13	Koninklijke HFC	34	11	9	14	49	50	−1	42	
14	HHC	34	10	11	13	41	53	−12	41	
15	UNA (R)	34	12	5	17	57	79	−22	41	Qualification to relegation play-offs
16	Spakenburg (R)	34	9	10	15	61	66	−5	37	Qualification to relegation play-offs
17	Jong Vitesse (Note: Jong Vitesse were deducted three points for having 3 players from the first team on the field at the same time, while the rules only allow 2 players from the first team on the field at the same time.) (R)	34	11	4	19	66	79	−13	34	Relegation to Derde Divisie
18	Jong Twente (R)	34	6	7	21	32	64	−32	25	Relegation to Derde Divisie

Rules for classification: 1) Points; 2) Goal difference; 3) Goals scored
(C) Champions; (P) Promoted; (R) Relegated

== Relegation play-offs ==
See (Derde Divisie) Promotion/relegation play-offs Tweede and Derde Divisie.

== Number of teams by provinces ==
Number of teams	Province	Team(s)
5	South Holland	Barendrecht, Excelsior Maassluis, Jong Sparta, Katwijk and VVSB
4	Gelderland	Lienden, Jong Vitesse, TEC and De Treffers
3	North Holland	AFC, Jong AZ and Koninklijke HFC
2	North Brabant	Kozakken Boys and VV UNA
2	Overijssel	HHC and Jong Twente
2	Utrecht	GVVV and Spakenburg

== Attendances ==
#	Club	Average
1	Spakenburg	1,670
2	GVVV	1,126
3	HHC	1,090
4	Katwijk	1,084
5	Kozakken Boys	1,015
6	VVSB	821
7	Barendrecht	674
8	De Treffers	657
9	Excelsior Maassluis	655
10	Lienden	553
11	TEC	483
12	UNA	475
13	Jong AZ	419
14	HFC	369
15	Jong Vitesse	346
16	AFC	328
17	Jong Sparta	235
18	Jong Twente	192
