= Jules Van Bost =

Belgian footballer

Personal information
- Date of birth: 24 January 2003 (age 23)
- Place of birth: Belgium
- Height: 1.91 m (6 ft 3 in)
- Position: Center back

Team information
- Current team: Crossing Schaerbeek
- Number: 53

Youth career
- 2019–2022: Club Brugge
- 2022–2023: OH Leuven

Senior career*
| Years | Team | Apps | (Gls) |
| 2020–2022 | Club NXT | 1 | (0) |
| 2022–2024 | OH Leuven U23 | 50 | (0) |
| 2024–2025 | TOP Oss | 24 | (0) |
| 2026– | Crossing Schaerbeek | 1 | (0) |
- * Club domestic league appearances and goals as of 25 January 2026

Jules Van Bost (born 24 January 2003) is a Belgian footballer who plays as a center back for Belgian Division 1 club Crossing Schaerbeek.

== Career ==
=== Club NXT ===
Van Bost made his professional debut on 8 November 2020, coming on as an 88th-minute substitute for Nathan Fuakala in a 3–1 away defeat to Lommel.

=== OH Leuven ===
In May 2022, Van Bost returned to former youth club OH Leuven, joining the club's under-23 roster that played in the third-tier Belgian National Division 1.

=== TOP Oss ===
On 27 June 2024, Van Bost signed with TOP Oss in the Netherlands for two years, with the club option to extend for the third year.

=== Crossing Schaerbeek ===
On 22 December 2025, Van Bost agreed to return to Belgium and signed a one-and-a-half-year contract with Crossing Schaerbeek in the third-tier Belgian Division 1.

== Career statistics ==
=== Club ===
As of match played 11 May 2024

Appearances and goals by club, season and competition
| Club | Season | League | | | Cup | | Other | | Total | |
| Club | Season | Division | Apps | Goals | Apps | Goals | Apps | Goals | Apps | Goals |
|---|---|---|---|---|---|---|---|---|---|---|
| Club NXT | 2020–21 | Belgian First Division B | 1 | 0 | — | — | — | — | 1 | 0 |
| OH Leuven U-23 | 2022–23 | Belgian National Division 1 | 18 | 0 | — | — | — | — | 18 | 0 |
| OH Leuven U-23 | 2023–24 | Belgian National Division 1 | 32 | 0 | — | — | — | — | 32 | 0 |
| OH Leuven U-23 | Total | | 50 | 0 | 0 | 0 | 0 | 0 | 50 | 0 |
| Career total | | | 51 | 0 | 0 | 0 | 0 | 0 | 51 | 0 |
