= Asser Christelijke Voetbalvereniging =

Dutch football club

ACV
- Full name: Asser Christelijke; Voetbalvereniging
- Founded: 8 April 1939; 81 years ago
- Ground: Univé Sportpark (Stadsbroek); Assen
- Chairman: Bert Huizing
- Manager: Fred de Boer
- League: Tweede Divisie
- 2024–25: Tweede Divisie, 12th of 18
- Website: https://www.acvassen.nl/
Home colours

The Asser Christelijke Voetbalvereniging, known as ACV, is a football club based in the town of Assen, Netherlands, that competes in the Tweede Divisie, the third tier of the Dutch football league system. Founded in 1939, the team plays its home matches at Het Stadsbroek.

== History ==
The club was founded in 1939.

In 2008, the club was relegated for the first time since 1974 from the Hoofdklasse. After one successful Eerste Klasse season, in 2009 ACV was promoted back to the Hoofdklasse as unbeaten champions. In 2017–18 and in 2020–21 it played in the Derde Divisie. In the 2022–23 season, ACV got promoted to the Tweede Divisie after winning the Derde Divisie Saturday title.

== Current squad ==
As of 14 April, 2026

Note: Flags indicate national team as defined under FIFA eligibility rules; some limited exceptions apply. Players may hold more than one non-FIFA nationality.

| No. | Pos. | Nation | Player |
|---|---|---|---|
| 1 | GK | NED | Thijmen Renkel |
| 2 | DF | NED | Sietze de Klerk |
| 3 | DF | NED | Nande Wielink |
| 4 | DF | NED | Yannick Hettinga |
| 5 | DF | NED | Elijah Mansaray |
| 6 | MF | NED | Max Hamelink |
| 7 | FW | NED | Gijs Jasper |
| 8 | DF | NED | Lars Dijk |
| 10 | FW | NED | Boy Spijkerman |
| 11 | MF | NED | Justin Mulder |
| 12 | DF | JPN | Kotaro Nakanishi |
| 14 | MF | NED | Mees Gootjes |
| 15 | DF | NED | Finn Berends |

| No. | Pos. | Nation | Player |
|---|---|---|---|
| 17 | MF | NED | Steyn Strijker |
| 20 | MF | NED | Tom van der Werff |
| 21 | FW | NED | Kian Slor |
| 22 | FW | CUW | Lentini Caciano |
| 23 | MF | NED | Chadi Abida |
| 24 | DF | NED | Ties Oostra |
| 25 | MF | NED | Luca Broers |
| 26 | GK | NED | Erwin Jagt |
| 26 | GK | NED | Max Wolfs |
| 27 | FW | NED | Tim Lemmen |
| 27 | FW | NED | Sam Elting |
| 28 | DF | NED | Karim Bannani |

== Honours ==
- Hoofdklasse division title: 9

1977–78, 1978–79, 1979–80, 1985–86, 1986–87, 1989–90, 1991–92, 1993–94, 2001–02.

- Saturday Hoofdklasse title: 3

1977–78, 1985–86 en 1986–87

- National Hoofdklasse title: 2

1977–78, 1985–86

- Derde Divisie Saturday title: 1

2022-23
