= VV Noordwijk =

Dutch football club

Noordwijk
- Full name: Voetbalvereniging Noordwijk
- Founded: 1933; 92 years ago
- Ground: Sportpark Duinwetering; Noordwijk
- Capacity: 3,500
- Chairman: Henk Hoogervorst
- Manager: Kees Zethof
- League: Derde Divisie
- 2024–25: Tweede Divisie, 15th of 18 (relegated via play-offs)
- Website: www.vvnoordwijk.nl
Home colours

Voetbalvereniging Noordwijk is a Dutch football club founded in 1933, based in Noordwijk. It currently competes in the Derde Divisie.

== History ==
VV Noordwijk was founded on 4 March 1933.

=== 1940s–1960s: Vierde, Derde, and Tweede Klasse ===
During the 1940s and 1960s Noordwijk hovered between the Vierde Klasse and Derde Klasse of the Royal Dutch Football Association. It won section championships in the Vierde Klasse in 1948 and 1958 and in the Derde Klasse in 1961, promoting each time to the next level.

From 1961 through 1970 Noordwijk played for nine seasons in the Tweede Klasse. If finished in one of the top five positions during all these years, winning section championships in 1963, 1968, and 1970.

=== 1970s–1990s: Eerste Klasse ===
From 1970 through 1996 VV Noordwijk played in the Eerste Klasse winning section championships in 1972, 1976, 1978, 1980, 1981, and 1983, not promoting a level at any of these frequent championships.

Noordwijk reached the eighth finals in 1978–79 KNVB Cup.

In 1996 Noordwijk promoted to the Hoofdklasse, after it had completed the Eerste Klasse season merely in fifth position.

=== 2000s–2010s: Hoofdklasse and Topklasse ===
In 2005 Noordwijk won against Excelsior Maassluis 3–1 with the 2 decisive goals scored in extra time.

In the 2010–11 KNVB Cup it reached the quarterfinals where it lost 6–0 against RKC Waalwijk. Subsequent season, 2011–12 KNVB Cup, it lost 3–1 in the 2nd round against AFC Ajax.

In 2011 Noordwijk won the section championship after the decisive game, watched by 6000 spectators, against Quick Boys ended with a 1–0 victory. However the safe with the cash income was stolen and the proceedings of the game vanished. Noordwijk promoted from the Hoofdklasse to the newly formed Topklasse, now known as Derde Divisie. In 2012 Noordwijk ended in a strong fourth position but results in the Topklasse then deteriorated. In 2013 Noordwijk finished 9th. In 2014 the club relegated back to the Hoofdklasse from the 13th place in the Topklasse, after losing games against top team from the Hoofdklasse.

In 2012 Noordwijk lost 0–8 in practice game against the first squad of AFC Ajax. In 2013, the club was joined by keeper Joe van der Sar, the son of Edwin, who joined from the AFC Ajax youth, a career move similar the one taken by father Edwin in 1990. Joe van der Sar played in Noordwijk until 2017, gradually losing his opening position over time, then left to Young ADO Den Haag.

In 2016, Champions League winner Edwin van der Sar came out of retirement to play a single match for VV Noordwijk, when it suffered an injury crisis. He saved a penalty and conceded a goal in the match as it drew 1–1 with Jodan Boys.

In August 2017 it played against IJsselmeervogels and Fortuna Sittard in the 2017–18 KNVB Cup.

=== 2020s: Tweede Divisie ===
Since 2020, VV Noordwijk plays in the Tweede Divisie, the highest amateur level in the Netherlands.
