= SVV Scheveningen =

Dutch football club

- Full name: Scheveningse Voetbal Vereniging Scheveningen
- Nickname: sscnm
- Founded: 1919; 107 years ago
- Ground: Houtrust Scheveningen
- Capacity: 3,500
- Chairman: Ron Kleijn
- Manager: John Blok
- League: Vierde Divisie
- 2025–26: Derde Divisie B, 16th of 18 (relegated via play-offs)
Home colours	Away colours

Scheveningse Voetbal Vereniging Scheveningen is an association football club from Scheveningen, a district of The Hague, Netherlands. The club was founded 1 July 1919. It is currently playing in the Tweede Divisie, the third tier of football in the Netherlands.

It plays at the Houtrust Scheveningen.

== History ==
Between 1954 and 1971 the club played professional football under the names SHS and Holland Sport.

The club was selected by the French sports newspaper L'Équipe to participate in 1955–56 European Cup, but declined to do so.

The biggest success in the club's history was the overall amateur title in 1996. Martin Jol was the team manager at that time.

In the 2024–25 season, Scheveningen finished 17th and had to play in the relegation playoffs. They won their quarterfinal 3–0 on aggregate vs. Sportlust '46. However, Scheveningen lost 1–0 on aggregate to Kozakken Boys, which confirmed Scheveningen's relegation to the Derde Divisie
