= Rijnsburgse Boys =

Dutch football club

- Full name: Rijnsburgse Boys
- Nickname: Uien (Onions)
- Founded: 24 March 1930; 96 years ago
- Ground: Middelmors, Rijnsburg
- Capacity: 5,000
- Chairman: Koos van Rossum
- Manager: René van der Kooij
- League: Tweede Divisie
- 2025–26: Tweede Divisie, 5th of 18
Home colours

Rijnsburgse Boys is a football club based in Rijnsburg, Netherlands. The team compete in the Tweede Divisie, the third level of the Dutch football league system.

== History ==
The club was established on 24 March 1930. It currently plays in the Tweede Divisie. The club won the Saturday Hoofdklasse A title in the 2005–06, 2006–07 and 2008–09 seasons.

Since being founded in 1930 till 1957, the club has played on several locations in Rijnsburg. Since 1957 the club moved to Sportpark Middelmors, where it's still playing their homegames. The unofficial nickname of Rijnsburgse Boys is 'uien' - Dutch for "onions" - originating from the late 1500s, when Rijnsburg was famous for its onion farms.

The club has always been one of the most successful clubs in the Dutch amateur football. After losing a decision match in the 2015–16 season against GVVV (1–2), the club did not play first amateur-tier in a long time. In the 2016–17 season, Rijnsburg defeated Westlandia and SV Spakenburg to promote to the Tweede Divisie, the highest tier for non-pro teams.

Rijnsburgse Boys' first year in the Tweede Divisie was quite a success. The squad, managed by Pieter Mulders finished 5th in the top flight of non-pro football.

In the 2024–25 KNVB Cup, Rijnsburgse Boys defeated two consecutive professional clubs, beating Roda JC Kerkrade in the first round and FC Volendam in the second round.

== Players ==
=== First-team squad ===
As of 21 October 2026

Note: Flags indicate national team as defined under FIFA eligibility rules; some limited exceptions apply. Players may hold more than one non-FIFA nationality.

No.	Pos.	Nation	Player
1	GK	NED	Wesley Zonneveld
2	DF	NED	Thomas van Haaften
4	DF	NED	Daan Walraven
5	DF	NED	Rob Zandbergen
6	DF	NED	Bram Ros (captain)
7	FW	NED	Ilias Kariouh
8	MF	NED	Nino Klaver
9	FW	NED	Sel Bastmeijer
10	MF	NED	Kyan Lever
14	MF	NED	Ebi Broug
16	GK	NED	Tobias van der Kleij
18	MF	NED	Bram de Bruin
19	FW	NED	Jeffrey Buitenweg

No.	Pos.	Nation	Player
22	MF	NED	Jord van Nobelen
23	FW	NED	Manuel Francisco
25	GK	NED	Jonas Binnendijk
26	DF	NED	Mitch van Kempen
28	DF	NED	Calvin Tureaij
29	GK	NED	Tom Maarschalkerweerd
30	MF	NED	Steff van Rooijen
32	DF	NED	Nick de Haas
33	DF	MAR	Chahine van Bohemen
34	MF	NED	Younes Tufi
74	DF	NED	Jurre de Jong
77	FW	POR	João Simões
