= Sportpark De Westmaat =

Sporting complex in Spakenburg, Netherlands

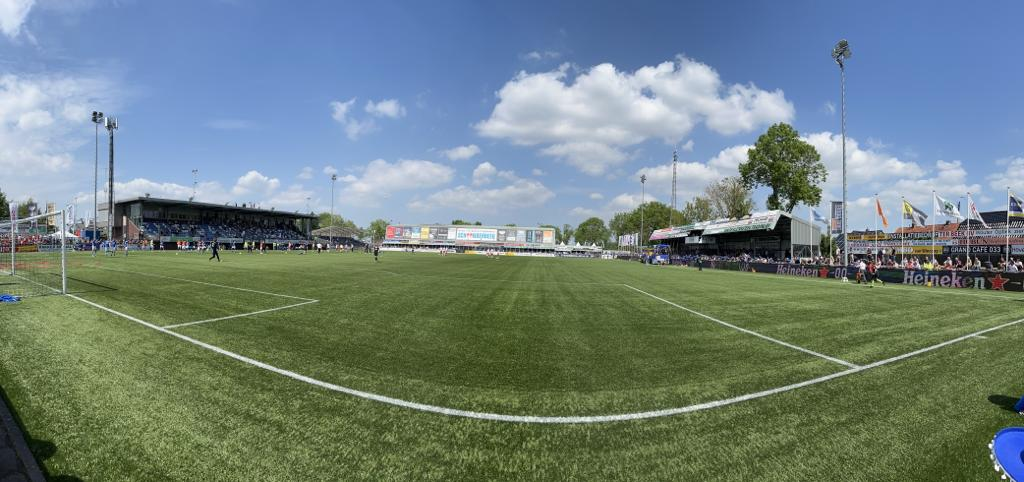
- Interactive map of Sportpark De Westmaat
- Location: Spakenburg, Netherlands
- Coordinates: 52.2570°N 5.3774°E
- Capacity: 8,000 (IJsselmeervogels); 8,000 (SV Spakenburg)

Tenants
- IJsselmeervogels; SV Spakenburg; Jong FC Utrecht (2016–2018)

Sportpark De Westmaat is a sporting complex located in Spakenburg, Netherlands. It is home to football clubs IJsselmeervogels and SV Spakenburg. The complex has eight fields. There are two stadiums at the sports complex. There are also indoor facilities in case of bad weather.

== Rode Westmaat ==
The red side of the complex is home to amateur club IJsselmeervogels. In the 2016–17 Derde Divisie, the club averaged about 2,000 fans per game as they secured promotion to the Tweede Divisie. In addition the "red" side has 3 other fields. The main stadium has a capacity of 6,000; making it one of the largest in the Tweede Divisie. There is also an LED board where sponsors of IJsselmeervogels can advertise by means of a message on LED boarding. This was unique in amateur football at the time of installation. The LED boarding was used for the first time during a game on January 7, 2011.

== Blauwe Westmaat ==
The blue side of the complex is the site of SV Spakenburg . In the 2016–17 Tweede Divisie, they averaged 1,900 fans per match as they were relegated to the Derde Divisie. There are also 3 other fields on the "blue" side. The main stadium has a capacity of 8,500; making it one of the largest in the Tweede Divisie.

== Jong FC Utrecht ==
Eerste Divisie side Jong FC Utrecht played select matches at Sportpark De Westmaat between 2016 and 2018.
