= Excelsior Maassluis =

Dutch football club

- Full name: VV Excelsior Maassluis
- Nickname: De Tricolores
- Founded: 1 June 1918; 108 years ago
- Ground: Sportpark Dijkpolder, Maassluis
- Capacity: 5,000
- Chairman: Harald Lourens
- Manager: Geert Arend Roorda
- League: Derde Divisie
- 2025–26: Tweede Divisie, 17th of 18 (relegated via play-offs)
Home colours

Excelsior Maassluis is a football club from Maassluis, Netherlands, founded in 1918. The club's home ground is the 5,000 capacity arena known as Sportpark Dijkpolder.

== History ==
Excelsior won the Hoofdklasse of 2013 and became champions of the Topklasse just two years later. Also known as the Tricolores, Excelsior due to their 2016 title win, was promoted to the Tweede Divisie. As so in the division's inaugural season Excelsior ended up at fifth in the league's standings.

In the 2023–24 season, Excelsior finished 16th and had to participate in the relegation playoffs. However, Excelsior defeated USV Hercules 4–1 on aggregate in the first round, Harkemase Boys 3–2 in the second round, and then defeated SC Genemuiden 6–1 in the final, retaining their Tweede Divisie status.

== Current squad ==
As of 16 January 2025

Note: Flags indicate national team as defined under FIFA eligibility rules; some limited exceptions apply. Players may hold more than one non-FIFA nationality.

No.	Pos.	Nation	Player
1	GK	NED	Tobias van der Kleij
2	DF	NED	Calvin Tureaij
3	DF	NED	Kevin Ringeling
4	DF	NED	Darwin Heuvelman
5	DF	NED	Gaultiér Overman
6	MF	NED	Nino van den Beemt
7	FW	NED	Redouan Omar Ouali
9	FW	NED	Bram Wennekers
10	FW	NED	Darren Maatsen
11	FW	NED	Pieter Langedijk
12	MF	NED	Remy van der Vooren
15	MF	CUW	Yaël Eisden
16	GK	NED	Karim El Fakiri

No.	Pos.	Nation	Player
17	FW	NED	Khallil Dahmani
18	MF	NED	Jurrian van Eerden
19	MF	NED	Samuel van der Velden
20	DF	NED	Niels Noordhoek
21	MF	NED	Jeremy Udenhout
22	FW	NED	Emian-Johan Semedo
24	GK	NED	Jaimy Kroesen
26	DF	NED	Sam Bronder
27	MF	NED	Devin Plank
28	DF	NED	Rens de Vreede
30	FW	NED	Marius van Mil
—	MF	NED	Benjamin Reemst

== Honours ==
- Hoofdklasse: 2013
- Topklasse: 2016
