= SV Spakenburg =

Dutch football club

- Full name: Sportvereniging Spakenburg
- Nickname: De Blauwen ("The Blues")
- Founded: 15 August 1931; 95 years ago
- Ground: Sportpark De Westmaat, Bunschoten
- Capacity: 8,500
- Chairman: Marc Schoonebeek
- Manager: Chris de Graaf
- League: Tweede Divisie
- 2025–26: Tweede Divisie, 4th of 18
- Website: spakenburg.com
Home colours

Sportvereniging Spakenburg is a football club based in Bunschoten-Spakenburg, Netherlands, which competes in the Tweede Divisie, the third tier of the Dutch football league system. The club was founded on 15 August 1931, and is regarded as one of the most successful amateur clubs in the Netherlands, having won three championships of the top tier in amateur football. In the 2022–23 season, the club reached the semi-finals of the KNVB Cup by eliminating two Eredivisie clubs.

Spakenburg plays its home matches at Sportpark De Westmaat. Their colours are blue and white stripes. The club has a long-standing rivalry with Bunschoten-Spakenburg neighbours IJsselmeervogels.

== History ==
=== Foundation and early years (1931–1947) ===
On Saturday, 15 August 1931, a group of enthusiasts founded the football club, initially named Stormvogels. At that time, several local football clubs were also established, such as Strandvogels, Noordster, and Spakenburgse Boys. However, there was no formal competition structure as we know it today, and the clubs mainly engaged in friendly matches and tournaments.

After a few years, the club changed its name to Windvogels. In 1935 the club participated in an organised league for the first time, joining the third division of the Utrecht Provincial Football Association (UPVB). Remarkably, in its inaugural year in the league, the team achieved the title of undefeated champions.

As the club continued to grow rapidly, reaching a membership of 200, it underwent another name change. In 1947, the club merged with local gymnastics team Lycurgus, leading to the renaming of the club to Sport Vereniging Spakenburg. This was also the year when SV Spakenburg achieved promotion to the highest possible amateur division for a Saturday club.

Located in the heart of the Dutch Bible Belt of Reformed Protestantism, playing football on Sundays was forbidden due to religious beliefs. As a result, both SV Spakenburg and their town rivals IJsselmeervogels explicitly stated in its statutes that it does not participate in Sunday football. Consequently, the clubs have historically played matches exclusively on Saturdays. To ensure the continuation of this tradition, SV Spakenburg signed a covenant with the Royal Dutch Football Association (KNVB) and the Association for Saturday Football (BZV).

=== Saturday titles and national recognition (1947–1971) ===
Spakenburg emerged as a leading Saturday amateur club after the Second World War, winning section titles in 1947, 1950 and 1952 and the Saturday amateur championship in 1947, 1950, 1952 and 1963. In August 1949, the club twice faced a Soestdijk Palace XI during anniversary festivities; Queen Juliana and Prince Bernhard attended both fixtures, and captain Jan van der Goot received a medal from the Prince after a 4–2 win in Spakenburg.

=== Hoofdklasse contenders (1971–2010) ===
With the KNVB's introduction of a national Eerste Klasse in 1971–72, Spakenburg qualified for the top tier under coach Joop van Basten and, after consolidation, won the Eerste Klasse B in 1973–74. The club's most successful season of the period came in 1984–85: Spakenburg regained the section title, won a play-off for the Saturday championship against Kozakken Boys and GVVV, captured the West I district cup, and were declared overall Dutch amateur champions after the deciding home match against Sunday champions DHC was abandoned shortly after Joop van de Groep's late penalty put Spakenburg 1–0 ahead (the first leg in Delft ended 2–2).

Further section titles followed in the 1986–87 and 1999–2000 seasons, the latter under coach Tijs Schipper, with Spakenburg finishing runners-up in the Saturday championship to Katwijk. In the 2007–08 season, Spakenburg won the Hoofdklasse B on the final day before finishing second in the subsequent play-off for the Saturday title behind Lisse.

The club remained a regular contender at Hoofdklasse level through 2010, ahead of the KNVB's reorganisation that created the national Topklasse (from 2010–11), which replaced the Hoofdklasse as the highest amateur division.

=== Topklasse (2010–2016) ===
Spakenburg were among the founder members of the Topklasse, created as the highest amateur division in 2010, and established themselves as one of its stronger Saturday clubs. They won the Saturday section in 2011–12 under André Paus, and again in 2013–14, when a decider was needed to separate them from GVVV. Victory over Sunday champions AFC in the subsequent play-off brought the overall Dutch amateur championship, the club's first since 1985. The club remained in the Topklasse until it was superseded in 2016, when the KNVB introduced the national Tweede Divisie and renamed the Topklasse the Derde Divisie.

=== Tweede Divisie (2016–present) ===
Placed in the Tweede Divisie when the division was formed in 2016, Spakenburg were relegated after a single season, but won the Saturday section of the Derde Divisie at the first attempt under John de Wolf and returned in 2018.

The club attracted national attention in 2022–23, when away wins over the Eredivisie clubs Groningen and Utrecht made Spakenburg only the third amateur side to reach the semi-finals of the KNVB Cup. PSV ended the run with a 2–1 win at De Westmaat, in which Dwayne Green became the first amateur player to score in a semi-final of the competition.

Spakenburg won the Tweede Divisie in 2023–24 under Chris de Graaf, finishing with a record points total for the division. The title brought no promotion, as the KNVB allowed no sporting promotion of first teams from the Tweede Divisie to the professional Eerste Divisie and the club's board ruled out taking up professional status.

=== Selected matches v professional clubs ===
Spakenburg v professional opponents in the KNVB Cup (selected)
Date	Round	Home/away	Opponent	Score	Notes
5 October 1974	–	A	PEC Zwolle	0–2	–
8 October 1983	–	H	FC Groningen	1–4	–
20 October 1984	–	H	Cambuur	1–1	Replay system
31 October 1984	Replay	A	Cambuur	1–3	–
27 November 1985	–	H	ADO Den Haag	1–1	Replay system
8 February 1986	Replay	A	ADO Den Haag	0–2	–
7 October 1987	–	H	MVV	0–1	After extra time
1 October 1988	–	H	Dordrecht	3–2	–
18 November 1988	–	H	AZ	1–4	–
2 September 1989	–	H	Heracles Almelo	2–0	–
4 October 1989	–	H	De Graafschap	3–2	–
13 December 1989	–	N	Feyenoord	0–4	Played at De Kuip
12 October 1991	–	A	TOP Oss	1–2	–
18 August 1999	Group	A	Utrecht	1–6	–
23 September 1999	Group	A	NEC	0–3	–
11 August 2000	Group	H	Volendam	1–4	–
30 August 2000	Group	H	Cambuur	2–8	–
11 August 2001	Group	H	NEC	0–0	–
19 September 2001	–	H	Veendam	1–2	–
10 August 2002	Group	H	PEC Zwolle	0–3	–
9 August 2003	–	H	Volendam	0–2	–
7 August 2004	–	H	Vitesse	0–1	–
25 September 2007	–	H	Roda JC	0–2	–
24 September 2008	–	H	Telstar	0–1	–
22 September 2009	–	H	MVV	3–1	–
28 October 2009	–	A	AZ	2–2	Lost 2–5 on pens
21 September 2010	–	H	RBC Roosendaal	0–0	Won on pens
10 November 2010	–	A	PSV	0–3	–
23 September 2014	–	H	NAC Breda	3–4	–
21 September 2016	–	H	Fortuna Sittard	2–1	–
31 October 2018	–	A	Willem II	0–5	–
22 January 2020	–	A	Ajax	0–7	–
26 October 2021	–	H	Dordrecht	3–0	–
14 December 2021	–	A	Telstar	3–3	Lost 3–5 on pens
12 January 2023	–	A	Groningen	3–2	–
28 February 2023	Quarter-final	A	Utrecht	4–1	–
4 April 2023	Semi-final	H	PSV	1–2	–
31 October 2023	–	H	Helmond Sport	3–1	–
19 December 2023	–	H	Excelsior	2–2	Lost 2–3 on pens

Key: H = home; A = away; N = neutral; "Group" = League Cup group phase; "Replay" = second match under former replay rules; "pens" = penalty shoot-out.

== Current squad ==
As of 24 October 2026

Note: Flags indicate national team as defined under FIFA eligibility rules; some limited exceptions apply. Players may hold more than one non-FIFA nationality.

No.	Pos.	Nation	Player
1	GK	NED	Stilanos Damkalis
2	DF	NED	Nick Verhagen
5	DF	BRB	Dwayne Green
6	MF	NED	Giovanni da Fonseca
7	FW	NED	Ahmed el Azzouti
8	MF	NED	Sam van Huffel
9	FW	NED	Mark van der Weijden
10	FW	NED	Des Kunst
11	FW	NED	Ravelino Junte
14	FW	NED	Sylvio Hage
15	DF	NED	Hero van Lopik
16	DF	NED	Olaf Kok
17	DF	NED	Rodney Kroeze
18	DF	NED	Tim Linthorst

No.	Pos.	Nation	Player
19	FW	NED	Bjorn Jansen
20	FW	NED	Floris Quaedvlieg
21	DF	NED	Wout den Engelsman
22	FW	NED	Jesse Hop
23	FW	NED	Stan Beune
24	GK	NED	Luca Neu
25	MF	NED	Konstantinos Siontis
26	MF	NED	Mark Veenhoven
29	DF	NED	Youri Koelewijn
33	FW	NED	Pieter Veenstra
34	MF	NED	Sisqo Lever
44	DF	NED	Jens Guiting
50	FW	NED	Marouane Afaker
77	GK	NED	Joey Houweling

== IJsselmeervogels–Spakenburg rivalry ==
IJsselmeervogels and SV Spakenburg have competed at the same level for much of their histories. The derby is widely regarded as one of the most intense fixtures in Dutch amateur football, often framed locally as a meeting between IJsselmeervogels' "Reds" — traditionally associated with "the people and the fishermen" — and Spakenburg's "Blues", linked to "farmers and clerks".

The rivalry escalated in 1987 when a homemade explosive device, thrown from the crowd, injured an assistant referee during the penultimate league match between the sides; in the years that followed, measures were taken to separate the clubs on matchdays. Tensions resurfaced in 1999 when Spakenburg signed Gérard van der Nooij and Pascal de Bruijn from IJsselmeervogels' title-winning team, prompting a municipal ban on the derby for several seasons before fixtures resumed in 2002. The match continues to attract large crowds and regular national and regional media coverage.

=== League derbies since the national Eerste Klasse (1971–) ===
The tables below list league meetings between Spakenburg and IJsselmeervogels since the KNVB introduced the national Eerste Klasse in 1971–72. Dates are in DMY format. Only league fixtures are included.

IJsselmeervogels v Spakenburg
Season	Date	Home team	Score	Away team
1972–73	2 September 1972	IJsselmeervogels	2–1	Spakenburg
1982–83	8 January 1983	IJsselmeervogels	1–1	Spakenburg
1985–86	16 November 1985	IJsselmeervogels	1–1	Spakenburg
1986–87	1 November 1986	IJsselmeervogels	0–0	Spakenburg
1989–90	24 February 1990	IJsselmeervogels	2–4	Spakenburg
1992–93	12 December 1992	IJsselmeervogels	1–0	Spakenburg
1993–94	19 March 1994	IJsselmeervogels	3–1	Spakenburg
1994–95	5 November 1994	IJsselmeervogels	0–0	Spakenburg
2002–03	28 September 2002	IJsselmeervogels	1–2	Spakenburg
2003–04	25 October 2003	IJsselmeervogels	0–2	Spakenburg
2004–05	12 March 2005	IJsselmeervogels	1–0	Spakenburg
2005–06	1 April 2006	IJsselmeervogels	0–0	Spakenburg
2006–07	21 April 2007	IJsselmeervogels	2–1	Spakenburg
2007–08	17 November 2007	IJsselmeervogels	1–5	Spakenburg
2008–09	9 May 2009	IJsselmeervogels	1–1	Spakenburg
2009–10	7 November 2009	IJsselmeervogels	0–2	Spakenburg
2010–11	16 April 2011	IJsselmeervogels	3–2	Spakenburg
2011–12	8 October 2011	IJsselmeervogels	2–2	Spakenburg
2012–13	9 March 2013	IJsselmeervogels	1–0	Spakenburg

IJsselmeervogels wins	Draws	Spakenburg wins
7	7	5

Spakenburg v IJsselmeervogels
Season	Date	Home team	Score	Away team
1972–73	2 December 1972	Spakenburg	2–1	IJsselmeervogels
1982–83	4 April 1983	Spakenburg	1–1	IJsselmeervogels
1985–86	17 May 1986	Spakenburg	2–2	IJsselmeervogels
1986–87	9 May 1987	Spakenburg	1–0	IJsselmeervogels
1989–90	9 September 1989	Spakenburg	0–0	IJsselmeervogels
1992–93	20 March 1993	Spakenburg	2–1	IJsselmeervogels
1993–94	25 September 1993	Spakenburg	1–0	IJsselmeervogels
1994–95	22 April 1995	Spakenburg	1–1	IJsselmeervogels
2002–03	12 April 2003	Spakenburg	3–0	IJsselmeervogels
2003–04	13 March 2004	Spakenburg	4–1	IJsselmeervogels
2004–05	23 October 2004	Spakenburg	2–3	IJsselmeervogels
2005–06	5 November 2005	Spakenburg	0–2	IJsselmeervogels
2006–07	11 November 2006	Spakenburg	1–2	IJsselmeervogels
2007–08	26 April 2008	Spakenburg	7–1	IJsselmeervogels
2008–09	13 December 2008	Spakenburg	1–3	IJsselmeervogels
2009–10	10 April 2010	Spakenburg	2–3	IJsselmeervogels
2010–11	6 November 2010	Spakenburg	2–3	IJsselmeervogels
2011–12	24 March 2012	Spakenburg	2–1	IJsselmeervogels
2012–13	22 September 2012	Spakenburg	2–1	IJsselmeervogels

Spakenburg wins	Draws	IJsselmeervogels wins
9	4	6
