= Spakenburg =

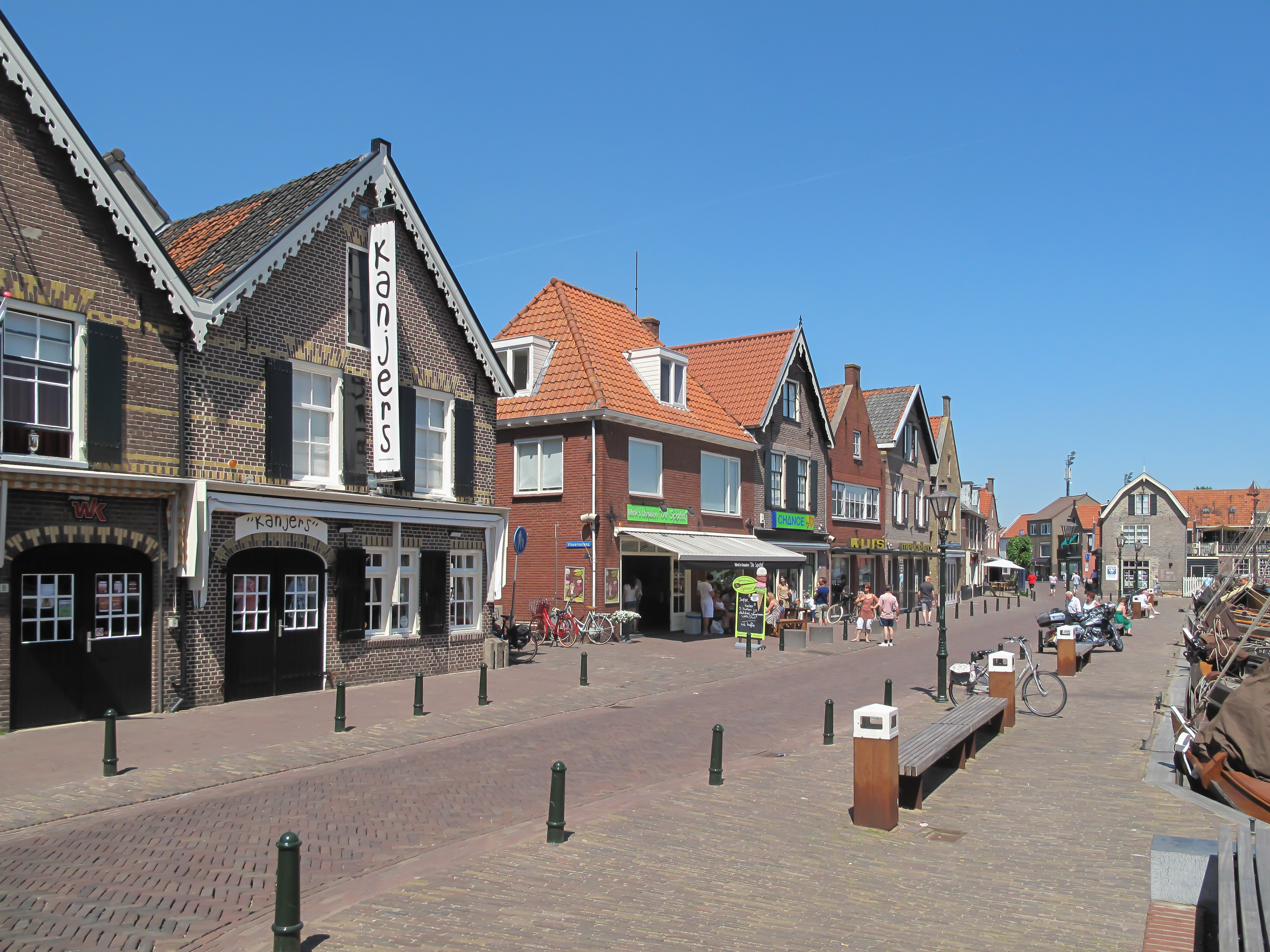

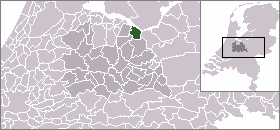

- Coordinates: 52°15′01″N 5°22′37″E
- Country: Netherlands
- Province: Utrecht
- Municipality: Bunschoten
  - Density: 638/km^{2} (1,650/sq mi)
- Postal code: 3751/3752
- Area code: 033
- Website: http://www.bunschoten.nl

Spakenburg is a Dutch village north of Bunschoten. Spakenburg is formally called Bunschoten-Spakenburg since its fusion with Bunschoten. The village lies south of the IJsselmeer in the municipality Bunschoten, Utrecht, and is about 5 kilometers from the A1 road.
