= Tweede Divisie =

- Founded: 1956; 70 years ago; refounded in 2016; 10 years ago
- Country: Netherlands
- Confederation: UEFA
- Number of clubs: 18
- Level on pyramid: 3
- Promotion to: Eerste Divisie (for reserve teams)
- Relegation to: Derde Divisie; U21 Division 1 (for reserve teams)
- Domestic cup: KNVB Cup
- Current champions: Quick Boys (2nd title) (2025–26)
- Current: 2026–27 Tweede Divisie

Tweede Divisie (Dutch pronunciation: [ˈtʋeːdə diˈvizi]; English: Second Division) is the highest amateur (and historically the lowest professional) football league in the Netherlands. It was established in 1956, together with the Eredivisie and the Eerste Divisie. Between 1956 and 1960 and between 1962 and 1966, the league consisted of two divisions, Tweede Divisie A and Tweede Divisie B. The league was disbanded in 1971. Six clubs were promoted to the Eerste Divisie (De Volewijckers, FC Eindhoven, FC VVV, Fortuna Vlaardingen, PEC and Roda JC), while the other eleven teams became amateur clubs.

Plans for a new, amateur Tweede Divisie, to be made up of 4 reserve teams and 14 Topklasse clubs, were approved in a KNVB assembly in December 2014. Thus, the Topklasse, renamed the Derde Divisie (English: Third Division), and leagues below decremented by one level, and furthermore, promotion and relegation among the second to fourth divisions were implemented starting in 2016–17. Despite its amateurism, the league obliges its clubs to have a minimum number of players under contract. No first team will be promoted to the Eerste Divisie until after 2022–23, but from the end of 2020–21 at first, the highest-ranked second (i.e., reserve) team gains promotion, while the lowest-ranked reserves are relegated to a new under-21 division. An under-23 competition has been established for the Tweede Divisie's amateur clubs that are not directly eligible for its under-21 equivalent. Because of the 2020–21 season's cancellation, promotion or relegation was suspended for five to 10 years in June 2022.

== Champions ==
- 1956–57: Leeuwarden & RBC
- 1957–58: ZFC & Heracles
- 1958–59: 't Gooi & Go Ahead
- 1959–60: EDO & Be Quick
- 1960–61: HFC Haarlem
- 1961–62: Velox
- 1962–63: VSV (beat HFC Haarlem in a play-off)
- 1963–64: NEC (beat Alkmaar '54 in a play-off)
- 1964–65: SC Cambuur (beat DFC in a play-off)
- 1965–66: Vitesse Arnhem & FC Den Bosch
- 1966–67: HFC Haarlem
- 1967–68: FC Wageningen
- 1968–69: De Graafschap
- 1969–70: SC Heerenveen
- 1970–71: Volewijckers
- 2016–17: Jong AZ
- 2017–18: Katwijk
- 2018–19: AFC
- 2019–20: No champions
- 2020–21: No champions
- 2021–22: Katwijk
- 2022–23: Katwijk
- 2023–24: Spakenburg
- 2024–25: Quick Boys

== All-time topscorers ==
#	Name	Clubs	Goals
1	Tonny Roosken	VV Zwartemeer, SC Drente	202
2	Leo Koopman	PEC Zwolle	128
3	Cees van Kooten	Hermes DVS	114
4	Evert Pluim	FC Hilversum, HVC	113
5	Kees Groeneveld	VV Baronie	93

== 2025–26 teams ==
Location of teams in the Tweede Divisie 2025–26

Club	City	2024–25 season	Home ground	Capacity
ACV Assen	Assen	12th	Sportpark ICT Specialist	5,000
AFC	Amsterdam	3rd	Sportpark Goed Genoeg	3,000
BVV Barendrecht	Barendrecht	9th	Sportpark De Bongerd	1,800
Excelsior Maassluis	Maassluis	14th	Sportpark Dijkpolder	5,000
GVVV	Veenendaal	7th	Sportpark Panhuis	4,500
Koninklijke HFC	Haarlem	8th	Sportpark Spanjaardslaan	1,500
HHC	Hardenberg	11th	Sportpark De Boshoek	4,500
HSV Hoek	Hoek	newly promoted	Sportpark Denoek	2,500
IJsselmeervogels	Spakenburg	newly promoted	Sportpark De Westmaat	6,000
Jong Almere City	Almere	6th	Yanmar Stadion	4,501
Jong Sparta	Rotterdam	16th	Het Kasteel	11,000
VV Katwijk	Katwijk	4th	Sportpark De Krom	6,000
Kozakken Boys	Werkendam	newly promoted	Sportpark De Zwaaier	3,000
Quick Boys	Katwijk aan Zee	1st	Sportpark Nieuw Zuid	8,100
Rijnsburgse Boys	Rijnsburg	2nd	Sportpark Middelmors	6,100
Spakenburg	Spakenburg	5th	Sportpark De Westmaat	8,500
De Treffers	Groesbeek	10th	Sportpark Zuid	4,000
RKAV Volendam	Volendam	13th	Sportpark Volendam	—
