= 2022–23 KNVB Cup =

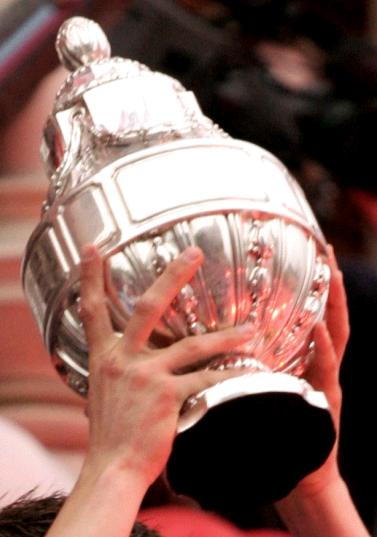
- KNVB Cup trophy

Tournament details
- Country: Netherlands
- Venue(s): De Kuip, Rotterdam
- Dates: 13 August 2022 – 30 April 2023
- Teams: 76

Final positions
- Champions: PSV (11th title)
- Runners-up: Ajax

Tournament statistics
- Matches played: 85
- Goals scored: 282 (3.32 per match)
- Top goal scorer(s): Floris van der Linden (5 goals)

The 2022–23 KNVB Cup, for sponsoring reasons officially called the TOTO KNVB Beker, was the 105th edition of the Dutch national football annual knockout tournament for the KNVB Cup. 46 teams contested, beginning in August with the first of two preliminary rounds, and concluded in April 2023 with the final played at De Kuip in Rotterdam.

PSV were the defending champions, having defeated Ajax 2–1 in the previous season's final. They went on to successfully defend their title, again defeating Ajax in the final, this time via a penalty shoot-out.

PSV contested the 2023 Johan Cruyff Shield against the 2022–23 Eredivisie champions Feyenoord, 1-0.

== Schedule ==
Round	Draw	Match Dates
First preliminary round	19 July 2022	13 August 2022
Second preliminary round	16 August 2022	20–21 September 2022
First round	23 September 2022	18–20 October 2022
Second round	22 October 2022	10–12 January 2023
Round of 16	14 January 2023	7–9 February 2023
Quarter-finals	11 February 2023	28 February–2 March 2023
Semi-finals	4 March 2023	4–5 April 2023
Final	4 March 2023	30 April 2023

== First preliminary round ==
13 August 2022	Staphorst	3–0	TOGB	Staphorst
17:00 CEST		Report		Stadium: Sportpark Het Noorderslag

13 August 2022	USV Hercules	5–1	Ter Leede	Utrecht
17:00 CEST		Report		Stadium: Sportpark Voordorp

13 August 2022	JOS Watergraafsmeer	1–3	Hoek	Amsterdam
17:00 CEST		Report		Stadium: Sportpark Drie Burg

13 August 2022	OJC Rosmalen	1–2	Sportlust '46	Rosmalen
17:00 CEST		Report		Stadium: Complex Groote Wielen

13 August 2022	Groene Ster	2–0	Barendrecht	Heerlen
17:00 CEST		Report		Stadium: Sportpark Pronsenbroek

13 August 2022	ADO '20	4–3 (a.e.t.)	VVOG	Heemskerk
19:00 CEST		Report		Stadium: Sportpark De Vlotter

== Second preliminary round ==
20 September 2022	ASWH	1–2	Kozakken Boys	Hendrik-Ido-Ambacht
20:00 CEST				Stadium: Sportpark Schildman

20 September 2022	De Treffers	3–1	Noordwijk	Groesbeek
20:00 CEST				Stadium: Sportpark Zuid

20 September 2022	IJsselmeervogels	0–0 (5–6 p)	Hoek	Spakenburg
20:00 CEST				Stadium: Sportpark De Westmaat

20 September 2022	Lisse	0–3	DVS '33	Lisse
20:00 CEST				Stadium: Ter Specke

20 September 2022	Quick Boys	1–2	Sportlust '46	Katwijk aan Zee
20:00 CEST				Stadium: Nieuw Zuid

20 September 2022	Rijnvogels	1–0	ACV	Katwijk
20:00 CEST				Stadium: Sportpark de Kooltuin

20 September 2022	Scheveningen	1–1 (4–5 p)	Harkemase Boys	Scheveningen
20:00 CEST				Stadium: Houtrust

20 September 2022	DOVO	0–1	Spakenburg	Veenendaal
20:00 CEST				Stadium: Sportpark Panhuis

21 September 2022	ADO '20	3–0	VVSB	Heemskerk
20:00 CEST				Stadium: Sportpark de Vlotter

21 September 2022	AFC	4–4 (4–5 p)	Staphorst	Amsterdam
20:00 CEST				Stadium: Goed Genoeg

21 September 2022	Blauw Geel '38	4–0	Baronie	Veghel
20:00 CEST				Stadium: Prins Willem Alexander Sportpark

21 September 2022	Excelsior Maassluis	1–2	USV Hercules	Maassluis
20:00 CEST				Stadium: Dijkpolder

21 September 2022	Gemert	1–2 (a.e.t.)	Urk	Gemert
20:00 CEST				Stadium: Sportpark Molenbroek

21 September 2022	Groene Ster	1–3	HV & CV Quick	Heerlerheide
20:00 CEST				Stadium: Pronsebroek

21 September 2022	Unitas	0–0 (4–5 p)	DEM	Gorinchem
20:00 CEST				Stadium: Sportpark Molenvliet

21 September 2022	GVVV	1–0	Sparta Nijkerk	Veenendaal
20:00 CEST				Stadium: Sportpark Panhuis

21 September 2022	HSC '21	2–2 (4–5 p)	RKAV Volendam	Haaksbergen
20:00 CEST				Stadium: Groot Scholtenhagen

21 September 2022	OFC Oostzaan	6–2 (a.e.t.)	UDI '19	Oostzaan
20:00 CEST				Stadium: Sportpark OFC

21 September 2022	OSS '20	1–2	Excelsior '31	Oss
20:00 CEST				Stadium: Sportpark De Rusheuvel

21 September 2022	SteDoCo	1–2	Dongen	Hoornaar
20:00 CEST				Stadium: Sportpark Stedoco

21 September 2022	TEC	1–0	UNA	Tiel
20:00 CEST				Stadium: Sportpark De Lok

== First round ==
In the first round, the 21 winners from the second preliminary round were joined by 4 other amateur clubs, the 16 clubs from the Eerste Divisie and 13 clubs from the Eredivisie. Ajax, AZ, Feyenoord, PSV and Twente automatically advanced to the second round due to their participation in European club competitions.

18 October 2022	Eindhoven	1–0	Willem II	Eindhoven
18:45 CEST	Kökçü 2'	Report		Stadium: Jan Louwers Stadion

18 October 2022	Almere City	2–0	TOP Oss	Almere
20:00 CEST	Poll 64'; Duijvestijn 70'	Report		Stadium: Yanmar Stadion

18 October 2022	Excelsior '31	2–3	ADO Den Haag	Rijssen
20:00 CEST	Veldkamp 28'; Werkhoven 49'	Report	34' Bilate; 58' Sellouki; 61' Verheydt	Stadium: Sportpark De Koerbelt

18 October 2022	GVVV	1–3	Den Bosch	Veenendaal
20:00 CEST	Spies 2'	Report	47' Van Grunsven; 70' Moller; 77' Maas	Stadium: Sportpark Panhuis

18 October 2022	Harkemase Boys	1–5	Volendam	Harkema
20:00 CEST	Margharita 32'	Report	16' Nazih; 43' Mühren; 66', 81' El Kadiri; 76' Zeefuik	Stadium: De Bosk

18 October 2022	Koninklijke HFC	0–1	Telstar	Haarlem
20:00 CEST		Report	31' Giousis	Stadium: Spanjaardslaan

18 October 2022	Hoek	2–4 (a.e.t.)	SC Heerenveen	Hoek
20:00 CEST	Schalkwijk 6'; Impens 26' (pen.)	Report	41' Köhlert; 49', 93', 119' Al Hajj	Stadium: Sportpark Denoek

18 October 2022	Rijnsburgse Boys	1–3	De Graafschap	Rijnsburg
20:00 CEST	Van der Moot 69'	Report	39' Gravenberch; 62' Yadir; 90+2' Neghli	Stadium: Middelmors

18 October 2022	Urk	2–0	Staphorst	Urk
20:00 CEST	Schraal 45'; De Boer 88'	Report		Stadium: De Vormt

18 October 2022	Roda JC	2–2 (a.e.t.) (6–7 p)	Heracles Almelo	Kerkrade
21:00 CEST	Postema 27'; Hartjes 79'	Report	47' Sierra; 52' Laursen	Stadium: Parkstad Limburg Stadion
	Penalties
	Daneels (penalty scored); Vente (penalty scored); Van der Heide (penalty scored); Limbombe (penalty missed); Vossebelt (penalty scored); Reith (penalty scored); Lambrix (penalty scored); Hartjes (penalty missed)		(penalty scored) Hoogma; (penalty scored) Bruns; (penalty scored) Sonnenberg; (penalty missed) Schoofs; (penalty scored) Sierra; (penalty scored) Rente; (penalty scored) Bucker; (penalty scored) Leš

19 October 2022	Dordrecht	0–3	Groningen	Dordrecht
18:45 CEST		Report	42', 81' Kasanwirjo; 90' Pepi	Stadium: Matchoholic Stadion

19 October 2022	ADO '20	1–2 (a.e.t.)	Emmen	Heemskerk
20:00 CEST	Glim 58'	Report	65' Živković; 98' Toufiqui	Stadium: Sportpark De Vlotter

19 October 2022	De Treffers	2–0	RKC Waalwijk	Groesbeek
20:00 CEST	Vlijter 17'; Campman 67'	Report		Stadium: Sportpark Zuid

19 October 2022	Excelsior Rotterdam	5–1	MVV Maastricht	Rotterdam
20:00 CEST	Kharchouch 22' (pen.), 53' (pen.); Lamprou 39', 44'; Azarkan 49'	Report	65' Kostons	Stadium: Van Donge & De Roo Stadion

19 October 2022	Go Ahead Eagles	3–1	Helmond Sport	Deventer
20:00 CEST	Idzes 7'; Rommens 34'; Sow 42'	Report	37' Lorentzen	Stadium: De Adelaarshorst

19 October 2022	Kozakken Boys	2–2 (a.e.t.) (5–4 p)	Vitesse	Werkendam
20:00 CEST	Hutten 45+2'; Van Zundert 82'	Report	14' Białek; 67' Kozłowski	Stadium: De Zwaaier
	Penalties
	Lommers (penalty scored); Altintas (penalty scored); Van Ingen (penalty scored); Stout (penalty scored); Ramsteijn (penalty scored)		(penalty scored) Kozlowski; (penalty scored) Tronstad; (penalty scored) Białek; (penalty missed) Meulensteen; (penalty scored) Baden Frederiksen

19 October 2022	Rijnvogels	0–3	Cambuur	Katwijk
20:00 CEST		Report	54' Van der Water; 71' Smit; 90+1' Balk	Stadium: Sportpark de Kooltuin

19 October 2022	Spakenburg	2–1	TEC	Spakenburg
20:00 CEST	Werkman 51'; Van den Dam 56' (o.g.)	Report	79' (o.g.) Artien	Stadium: Sportpark De Westmaat

19 October 2022	USV Hercules	0–1	NAC Breda	Utrecht
20:00 CEST		Report	90+4' Velanas	Stadium: Sportpark Voordorp

19 October 2022	NEC	3–2	Fortuna Sittard	Nijmegen
21:00 CEST	Navarro 35' (o.g.); El Karouani 47'; Marques 74'	Report	11' Bassett; 61' Guth	Stadium: Goffertstadion

20 October 2022	Sportlust '46	0–3	Utrecht	Woerden
18:45 CEST		Report	18', 70' Van de Streek; 90+3' Klaiber	Stadium: Sportpark Cromwijck

20 October 2022	DEM	1–4	Blauw Geel '38	Beverwijk
20:00 CEST	Daniels 45'	Report	42', 69' Van der Zanden; 52' Nasser; 57' Van de Nieuwenhof	Stadium: Sportpark Adrichem

20 October 2022	Dongen	1–2	VVV-Venlo	Dongen
20:00 CEST	Avontuur 12'	Report	74' Verheijen; 90' Braken	Stadium: De Biezen

20 October 2022	Katwijk	2–1	DVS '33	Katwijk
20:00 CEST	Suleiman 4'; Freriks 28'	Report	70' De Wit	Stadium: Sportpark De Krom

20 October 2022	OFC Oostzaan	1–3	Sparta Rotterdam	Oostzaan
20:00 CEST	Butter 19' (pen.)	Report	3' Eyenga-Lokilo; 82', 85' Lauritsen	Stadium: Sportpark OFC

20 October 2022	RKAV Volendam	2–4	HV & CV Quick	Volendam
20:00 CEST	Tol 44', 66'	Report	9', 54' George; 21' Van der Heiden; 75' Haddadi	Stadium: KWABO-Stadion

20 October 2022	HHC Hardenberg	0–1	PEC Zwolle	Hardenberg
21:00 CEST		Report	18' Vellios	Stadium: De Boshoek

== Second round ==
The second round consisted of 32 teams; the 27 winners from the first round as well as the five Eredivisie clubs which automatically advanced to the second round due to their participation in European club competitions. The draw took place on 22 October 2022.

10 January 2023	Twente	3–1	Telstar	Enschede
18:45 CET	Rots 37', 42'; Misidjan 67'	Report	68' Oude Kotte	Stadium: De Grolsch Veste; Referee: Sander van der Eijk

10 January 2023	HV & CV Quick	1–4	De Graafschap	The Hague
20:00 CET	Massar 22'	Report	2' De Jong; 18' Schouten; 34' Önal; 73' Brittijn	Stadium: Sportpark Nieuw Hanenburg; Referee: Laurens Gerrets

10 January 2023	Kozakken Boys	1–3	ADO Den Haag	Werkendam
20:00 CET	Ramsteijn 80'	Report	31', 70' Severina; 90+8' Zwarts	Stadium: De Zwaaier; Referee: Rob Dieperink

10 January 2023	NAC Breda	2–1 (a.e.t.)	Eindhoven	Breda
20:00 CET	Herrmann 90+1'; Besselink 120+1'	Report	1' Brym	Stadium: Rat Verlegh Stadion; Referee: Jeroen Manschot

10 January 2023	Sparta Rotterdam	1–2	PSV Eindhoven	Rotterdam
21:00 CET	Verschueren 61'	Report	34' Simons; 45+1' Madueke	Stadium: Het Kastell; Referee: Serdar Gözübüyük

11 January 2023	Excelsior	1–4	AZ	Rotterdam
18:45 CET	Kharchouch 32'	Report	13' Odgaard; 35' D. de Wit; 39' Karlsson; 79' Pavlidis	Stadium: Van Donge & De Roo Stadion; Referee: Bas Nijhuis

11 January 2023	Almere City	0–4	NEC	Almere
20:00 CET		Report	5' Tannane; 43' Tavşan; 63' Marques; 80' Musaba	Stadium: Yanmar Stadion; Referee: Marc Nagtegaal

11 January 2023	SC Heerenveen	2–0	Volendam	Heerenveen
20:00 CET	Van Amersfoort 48'; Van Hooijdonk 74'	Report		Stadium: Abe Lenstra Stadion; Referee: Ingmar Oostrom

11 January 2023	De Treffers	1–0	Cambuur	Groesbeek
20:00 CET	Den Dekker 30'	Report		Stadium: Sportpark Zuid; Referee: Joey Kooij

11 January 2023	VVV-Venlo	2–3	Emmen	Venlo
20:00 CET	Huisman 58'; Venema 75'	Report	31' Vlak; 34' Diemers; 90+4' Araujo	Stadium: De Koel; Referee: Martin Pérez

11 January 2023	Den Bosch	0–2	Ajax	's-Hertogenbosch
21:00 CET		Report	20' (pen.) Tadić; 52' Taylor	Stadium: De Vliert; Referee: Edwin van de Graaf

12 January 2023	Heracles Almelo	0–1	Go Ahead Eagles	Almelo
18:45 CET		Report	48' Lidberg	Stadium: Erve Asito; Referee: Jannick van der Laan

12 January 2023	Urk	0–3	Katwijk	Urk
20:00 CET		Report	6' Freriks; 73' Van Mil; 89' Mercera	Stadium: De Vormt; Referee: Robin Hensgens

12 January 2023	Blauw Geel '38	1–3	Utrecht	Veghel
20:00 CET	Van den Nieuwenhof 69'	Report	2' Van de Streek; 32' Toornstra; 42' Douvikas	Stadium: Prins Willem Alexander Sportpark; Referee: Jochem Kamphuis

12 January 2023	Groningen	2–3	Spakenburg	Groningen
20:00 CET	Dankerlui 77', 84'	Report	10' Koelewijn; 32' (pen.), 69' (pen.) Van der Linden	Stadium: Euroborg; Referee: Danny Makkelie

12 January 2023	Feyenoord	3–1	PEC Zwolle	Rotterdam
21:00 CET	Wieffer 29'; Danilo 34', 56'	Report	3' Medunjanin	Stadium: De Kuip; Referee: Pol van Boekel

== Round of 16 ==
The round of 16 consisted of the sixteen winners from the second round. The draw took place on 14 January 2023, with matches being played from 7 to 9 February 2023.

7 February 2023	AZ	1–2 (a.e.t.)	Utrecht	Alkmaar
18:45 CET	Karlsson 86'	Report	58' Viergever; 93' Maeda	Stadium: AFAS Stadion; Attendance: 10,214; Referee: Jochem Kamphuis

7 February 2023	De Graafschap	3–0	De Treffers	Doetinchem
20:00 CET	Önal 49'; Korte 57'; Benschop 77'	Report		Stadium: De Vijverberg; Attendance: 8,075; Referee: Sander van der Eijk

7 February 2023	NAC Breda	1–2	SC Heerenveen	Breda
21:00 CET	Boere 16'	Report	45+1', 53' Van Hooijdonk	Stadium: Rat Verlegh Stadion; Referee: Alex Bos

8 February 2023	PSV Eindhoven	3–1	Emmen	Eindhoven
18:45 CET	Branthwaite 7', 14'; De Jong 76'	Report	48' Diemers	Stadium: Philips Stadion; Attendance: 29,802; Referee: Ingmar Oostrom

8 February 2023	Spakenburg	1–1 (a.e.t.) (4–1 p)	Katwijk	Bunschoten
20:00 CET	Van der Linden 36'	Report	60' Van Mil	Stadium: Sportpark De Westmaat; Attendance: 3,689; Referee: Bas Nijhuis
	Penalties
	Van der Linden (penalty scored); Van Lopik (penalty scored); Volkert (penalty scored); Admiraal (penalty scored)		(penalty scored) Freriks; (penalty missed) Van der Meer; (penalty missed) Schulte

8 February 2023	Feyenoord	4–4 (a.e.t.) (5–3 p)	NEC	Rotterdam
21:00 CET	Kökçü 90' (pen.); Paixão 90+2'; Giménez 98'; Dilrosun 116'	Report	33' Verdonk; 45' Marques; 96', 118' Bruijn	Stadium: De Kuip; Attendance: 25,360; Referee: Rob Dieperink
	Penalties
	Kökçü (penalty scored); Giménez (penalty scored); Hancko (penalty scored); Idrissi (penalty scored); Paixão (penalty scored)		(penalty scored) Cissoko; (penalty scored) Proper; (penalty scored) Kramer; (penalty missed) Bronkhorst

9 February 2023	Twente	0–1	Ajax	Enschede
18:45 CET		Report	70' Kudus	Stadium: De Grolsch Veste; Attendance: 29,500; Referee: Danny Makkelie

9 February 2023	ADO Den Haag	1–0	Go Ahead Eagles	The Hague
21:00 CET	70' Zwarts	Report		Stadium: Bingoal Stadion; Attendance: 6,625; Referee: Edwin van de Graaf

== Quarter-finals ==
The quarter-finals consisted of the eight winners from the round of 16. The draw took place on 11 February 2023, with matches being played on 28 February through 2 March 2023.

28 February 2023	Utrecht	1–4	Spakenburg	Utrecht
20:00 CET	Douvikas 64'	Report	12' Vink; 59' Admiraal; 66' Artien; 75' Van der Linden	Stadium: Stadion Galgenwaard; Attendance: 21,733; Referee: Martin van den Kerkhof

1 March 2023	SC Heerenveen	0–1	Feyenoord	Heerenveen
20:00 CET		Report	80' Giménez	Stadium: Abe Lenstra Stadion; Attendance: 12,943; Referee: Pol van Boekel

2 March 2023	PSV Eindhoven	3–1	ADO Den Haag	Eindhoven
18:45 CET	Bakayoko 12'; Til 21'; Sangaré 54'	Report	56' Sellouki	Stadium: Philips Stadion; Attendance: 27,003; Referee: Bas Nijhuis

2 March 2023	De Graafschap	0–3	Ajax	Doetinchem
21:00 CET		Report	12' Sánchez; 26' Bergwijn; 78' Brobbey	Stadium: De Vijverberg; Attendance: 12,500; Referee: Allard Lindhout

== Semi-finals ==
The semi-finals matches were played on 4 and 5 April 2023.

4 April 2023	Spakenburg	1–2	PSV Eindhoven	Spakenburg
20:00 CEST	Green 59'	Report	43' Gutiérrez; 46' Van Aanholt	Stadium: Sportpark De Westmaat; Attendance: 6,300; Referee: Jeroen Manschot

5 April 2023	Feyenoord	1–2	Ajax	Rotterdam
20:00 CEST	Giménez 45+2'	Report	14' Tadić; 51' Klaassen	Stadium: De Kuip; Attendance: 47,500; Referee: Allard Lindhout

== Final ==
30 April 2023
18:00 UTC+02:00

Ajax	1−1 (a.e.t.)	PSV
Branthwaite 42' (o.g.)	Report	Hazard 67'
Penalties
Tadić (penalty scored); Brobbey (penalty missed); Timber (penalty missed); Godts (penalty scored); Álvarez (penalty missed)	2−3	(penalty scored) Hazard; (penalty missed) Ramalho; (penalty missed) Sangaré; (penalty scored) El Ghazi; (penalty scored) Silva

De Kuip, Rotterdam
Attendance: 40,650
Referee: Dennis Higler

== Top scorers ==
Rank	Player	Club	Goals
1	(Netherlands) Floris van der Linden	Spakenburg	5
2	(Netherlands) Niels Butter	Oostzaan	4
2	(Netherlands) Nabil Haddadi	Quick	4
4	Twelve players		3
