= 2023–24 KNVB Cup =

Dutch football tournament season

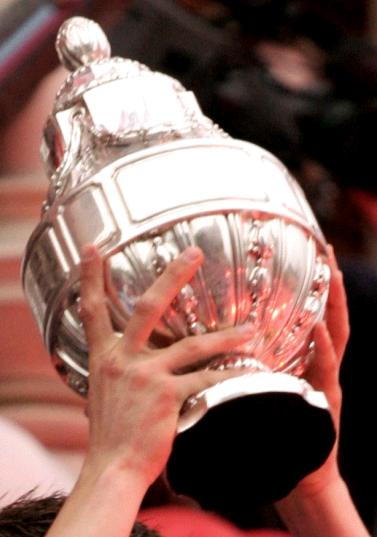
- KNVB Cup trophy

Tournament details
- Country: Netherlands
- Venue(s): De Kuip, Rotterdam
- Dates: 12 August 2023 – 21 April 2024
- Teams: 110

Final positions
- Champions: Feyenoord (14th title)
- Runners-up: NEC

Tournament statistics
- Top goal scorer: Kornelius Normann Hansen (5 goals)

The 2023–24 KNVB Cup, for sponsoring reasons officially called the TOTO KNVB Beker, was the 106th edition of the Dutch national football annual knockout tournament for the KNVB Cup. 110 teams contested, beginning in August with the first of two preliminary rounds, and ending in April 2024 with the final played at De Kuip in Rotterdam. They qualified for the 2024–25 UEFA Europa League league stage. PSV were the two-time defending champions, having defeated Ajax 3–2 on penalties after a 1–1 draw in the previous season's final. They were unable to defend their title after losing to eventual champions Feyenoord in the round of 16.

Feyenoord won the cup (their fourteenth cup win) on 21 April 2024, defeating NEC 1–0 in the final. Since they qualified for European football based on league position, the Europa League spot from the cup was passed to the fourth-placed team of the 2023–24 Eredivisie.

== Schedule ==
Round	Draw	Match Dates
First preliminary round	4 July 2023	12–13 August 2023
Second preliminary round	15 August 2023	19–20 September 2023
First round	23 September 2023	31 October – 2 November 2023
Second round	4 November 2023	19–21 December 2023
Round of 16	21 December 2023	16–18 January 2024
Quarter-finals	20 January 2024	6–8 February 2024
Semi-finals	10 February 2024	27–29 February 2024
Final	10 February 2024	21 April 2024

== First preliminary round ==
12 August 2023	BVV Barendrecht	2–1	SC Genemuiden	Barendrecht
14:30 CEST	Jouhri 10', (yellow card) 70'; Vugts 55'; Bayram (yellow card) 58'; Drexhage (yellow card) 90+1'	Report	Van Dalfsen (yellow card) 27'; Etten 44'; Van de Wetering (yellow card) 81'; Tuinman (yellow card) 84'; Beimers (yellow card) 90'	Stadium: Stadion Woudestein

12 August 2023	VV Eemdijk	5–0	VV Bunde	Bunschoten
14:30 CEST				Stadium: De Vinken

12 August 2023	HSV Hoek	3–2	SteDoCo	Hoek
14:30 CEST				Stadium: Sportpark Denoek

12 August 2023	SV Nieuwkoop	0–2	RKAV Volendam	Nieuwkoop
14:30 CEST				Stadium: Sportpark De Dulen

12 August 2023	VV SJC	2–1 (a.e.t.)	SV Bon Boys	Noordwijk
14:30 CEST				Stadium: Sportpark SJC

12 August 2023	Blauw Geel '38	5–1	SVOD '22	Veghel
15:00 CEST				Stadium: Prins Willem Alexander Sportpark

12 August 2023	CSV Apeldoorn	1–0 (a.e.t.)	ODIN '59	Apeldoorn
15:00 CEST				Stadium: Sportpark Orderbos

12 August 2023	DVS '33	1–0	SV Urk	Ermelo
15:00 CEST				Stadium: Sportpark Zuid

12 August 2023	IJsselmeervogels	2–1	TOGB	Spakenburg
15:00 CEST				Stadium: Sportpark De Westmaat

12 August 2023	VV Kloetinge	6–0	CSV BOL	Kloetinge
15:00 CEST				Stadium: Wesselopark

12 August 2023	Sparta Nijkerk	2–0	ONS Sneek	Nijkerk
15:00 CEST				Stadium: De Ebbenhorst

12 August 2023	SV TEC	1–1 (a.e.t.) (3–2 p)	VV DOVO	Tiel
15:30 CEST				Stadium: Sportpark De Lok

12 August 2023	VVSB	3–3 (a.e.t.) (4–3 p)	FC Rijnvogels	Noordwijkerhout
15:30 CEST				Stadium: Sportpark De Boekhorst

12 August 2023	SV AWC	1–2	Staphorst	Wijchen
17:00 CEST				Stadium: Sportpark De Wijchert

12 August 2023	AGB	1–2	Olde Veste	Amsterdam
17:00 CEST				Stadium: Sportpark Ookmeer

12 August 2023	RKVV DEM	1–0 (a.e.t.)	XerxesDZB	Beverwijk
17:00 CEST				Stadium: Sportpark Adrichem

12 August 2023	GVV Unitas	4–0	Blauw Wit '34	Gorinchem
17:00 CEST				Stadium: Sportpark Molenvliet

12 August 2023	HSC '21	3–4 (a.e.t.)	Harkemase Boys	Haaksbergen
17:00 CEST				Stadium: Groot Scholtenhagen

12 August 2023	VPV Purmersteijn	0–2	Sportlust '46	Purmerend
17:00 CEST				Stadium: Sportpark Purmersteijn

12 August 2023	USV Hercules	2–1	VV Berkum	Utrecht
17:00 CEST				Stadium: Sportpark Voordorp

12 August 2023	Veensche Boys	1–2	HVCH	Nijkerkerveen
17:00 CEST				Stadium: Sportvereniging Veensche Boys

12 August 2023	VV Baronie	0–1	VV Hoogeveen	Breda
18:00 CEST				Stadium: De Blauwe Kei

12 August 2023	RKVV Zwaluw VFC	1–5	VV Scherpenzeel	Vught
18:00 CEST				Stadium: Sportpark Bergenshuizen

12 August 2023	OJC Rosmalen	5–1	Oss '20	Rosmalen
18:00 CEST				Stadium: Sportpark De Groote Wielen

13 August 2023	Avanti '31	0–3	SV Meerssen	Schijndel
14:00 CEST				Stadium: Sportpark De Molenheide

13 August 2023	VV Jubbega	3–5 (a.e.t.)	VV UNA	Jubbega
14:00 CEST				Stadium: Sportpark it Heidefjild

13 August 2023	RKVV Westlandia	3–1	Quick 1888	Naaldwijk
14:00 CEST				Stadium: De Hoge Bomen

13 August 2023	RKSV Groene Ster	6–0	RKSV Groen Wit	Heerlerheide
14:30 CEST				Stadium: Pronsebroek

13 August 2023	Kampong	2–4	VV Gemert	Utrecht
14:30 CEST				Stadium: Sportpark Maarschalkerweerd

13 August 2023	RKSV Nuenen	4–2	VV Chevremont	Nuenen
14:30 CEST				Stadium: Oude Landen

== Second preliminary round ==
19 September 2023	SV Spakenburg	1–0	VV Scherpenzeel	Bunschoten
20:00 CEST				Stadium: Sportpark De Westmaat

19 September 2023	SVV Scheveningen	2–1	HSV Hoek	Scheveningen
20:00 CEST				Stadium: Houtrust Scheveningen

19 September 2023	RKVV DEM	3–1	Sportlust '46	Beverwijk
20:00 CEST				Stadium: Sportpark Adrichem

19 September 2023	GVVV	5–2	BVV Barendrecht	Veenendaal
20:00 CEST				Stadium: Sportpark Panhuis

19 September 2023	CSV Apeldoorn	1–3	OJC Rosmalen	Apeldoorn
20:00 CEST				Stadium: Sportpark Orderbos

19 September 2023	VV Eemdijk	3–2	Harkemase Boys	Bunschoten
20:00 CEST				Stadium: De Vinken

19 September 2023	Sparta Nijkerk	4–2	GVV Unitas	Nijkerk
20:00 CEST				Stadium: De Ebbenhorst

19 September 2023	d'Olde Veste	0–2	VV Noordwijk	Steenwijk
20:00 CEST				Stadium: Sportpark Parallelweg

19 September 2023	DVS '33	0–2	IJsselmeervogels	Ermelo
20:00 CEST				Stadium: Sportpark Zuid

19 September 2023	RKAV Volendam	3–0	RKVV Westlandia	Volendam
20:00 CEST				Stadium: KWABO-stadion

20 September 2023	VVSB	1–2	VV UNA	Noordwijkerhout
20:00 CEST				Stadium: Sportpark De Boekhorst

20 September 2023	SV TEC	2–0	SV Meerssen	Tiel
20:00 CEST				Stadium: Sportpark De Lok

20 September 2023	RKSV Nuenen	0–0 (a.e.t.) (2–3 p)	Excelsior Maassluis	Nuenen
20:00 CEST				Stadium: Oude Landen

20 September 2023	ACV	1–5	USV Hercules	Assen
20:00 CEST				Stadium: Univé Sportpark

20 September 2023	ADO '20	0–1	Quick Boys	Heemskerk
20:00 CEST				Stadium: Sportpark De Vlotter

20 September 2023	VV SJC	0–0 (a.e.t.) (4–3 p)	VV Gemert	Noordwijk
20:00 CEST				Stadium: Sportpark SJC

20 September 2023	HVCH	1–3	De Treffers	Heesche
20:00 CEST				Stadium: Sportpark De Braaken

20 September 2023	RKSV Groene Ster	1–0	Kozakken Boys	Heerlerheide
20:00 CEST				Stadium: Pronsebroek

20 September 2023	FC Lisse	1–0	Blauw Geel '38	Lisse
20:00 CEST				Stadium: Ter Specke

20 September 2023	VV Hoogeveen	3–0	Staphorst	Hoogeveen
20:00 CEST				Stadium: Sportpark Bentinckspark

20 September 2023	VV Kloetinge	1–3	Koninklijke HFC	Kloetinge
20:00 CEST				Stadium: Wesselopark

== First round ==
In the first round, the 21 winners from the second preliminary round were joined by 4 other amateur clubs, the 16 clubs from the Eerste Divisie and 13 clubs from the Eredivisie. Ajax, AZ, Feyenoord, PSV and Twente automatically advanced to the second round due to their participation in European club competitions.

31 October 2023	De Graafschap	2–0	Emmen	Doetinchem
18:45 CET	Schouten 20' (o.g.); Colyn 90+2'	Report		Stadium: De Vijverberg

31 October 2023	De Treffers	4–0	VV UNA	Groesbeek
20:00 CET	Den Dekker 25'; Thomassen 44'; Vlijter 57'; Hunte 89'	Report		Stadium: Sportpark Zuid

31 October 2023	RKSV Groene Ster	0–1	Vitesse	Heerlerheide
20:00 CET		Report	83' Oroz	Stadium: Sportpark Pronsebroek

31 October 2023	GVVV	1–0	Telstar	Veenendaal
20:00 CET	Berrio 89'	Report		Stadium: Sportpark Panhuis

31 October 2023	SC Heerenveen	5–1	VVV-Venlo	Heerenveen
20:00 CET	Van Amersfoort 21', 40', 44'; Van Ee 68'; Karlsbakk 90'	Report	76' Allouch	Stadium: Abe Lenstra Stadion

31 October 2023	Koninklijke HFC	1–4 (a.e.t.)	Go Ahead Eagles	Haarlem
20:00 CET	Bouchnafa 86'	Report	90' Nauber; 101' Edvardsen; 111' Sow; 119' Baeten	Stadium: Sportpark Spanjaardslaan

31 October 2023	FC Lisse	1–3	Dordrecht	Lisse
20:00 CET	Van Ekeris 90+6'	Report	31', 90+3', 90+9' Kriwak	Stadium: Sportpark Ter Specke

31 October 2023	VV Noordwijk	0–1	ADO Den Haag	Noordwijk
20:00 CET		Report	16' Van der Sande	Stadium: Sportpark Duinwetering

31 October 2023	Quick Boys	1–0	NAC Breda	Katwijk aan Zee
20:00 CET	Broekhuizen 25'	Report		Stadium: Sportpark Nieuw Zuid

31 October 2023	OJC Rosmalen	1–8	Almere City	Rosmalen
20:00 CET	Hassan 26'	Report	4', 16', 50' Hansen; 41' Robinet; 55' Royo; 63' Cathline; 84' Duijvestijn; 89' Corryn	Stadium: Sportpark De Groote Wielen

31 October 2023	SV Spakenburg	3–1	Helmond Sport	Spakenburg
20:00 CET	Van der Linden 31'; El Azzouti 90+2'; Van Huffel 90+4'	Report	8' Van Ooijen	Stadium: Sportpark De Westmaat

31 October 2023	Utrecht	3–2	RKC Waalwijk	Utrecht
21:00 CET	Fraulo 7'; Van der Hoorn 17'; Lidberg 30' (pen.)	Report	44', 51' Lokesa	Stadium: Stadion Galgenwaard

1 November 2023	HHC Hardenberg	2–0	Heracles Almelo	Hardenberg
18:45 CET	Jones 35'; Drost 63'	Report		Stadium: Sportpark De Boshoek

1 November 2023	AFC	1–0	PEC Zwolle	Amsterdam
20:00 CET	Been 86'	Report		Stadium: Sportpark Goed Genoeg

1 November 2023	RKVV DEM	3–1	VV Hoogeveen	Beverwijk
20:00 CET	De Vries 4', 17'; Van Doorneveld 86'	Report	72' Kamphuis	Stadium: Sportpark Adrichem

1 November 2023	IJsselmeervogels	0–2	Sparta Rotterdam	Spakenburg
20:00 CET		Report	37' Neghli; 88' Brym	Stadium: Sportpark De Westmaat

1 November 2023	VV Katwijk	5–0	SV TEC	Katwijk
20:00 CET	Janmaat 22', 28'; Doesburg 61'; Van Anholt 76' (o.g.); Van der Meer 82'	Report		Stadium: Sportpark De Krom

1 November 2023	Rijnsburgse Boys	0–1	Groningen	Rijnsburg
20:00 CET		Report	71' Peersman	Stadium: Sportpark Middelmors

1 November 2023	RKAV Volendam	5–0	VV Eemdijk	Volendam
20:00 CET	Tol 34', 73'; Van Baarsen 36'; Beers 39'; Plat 77'			Stadium: KWABO-Stadion; Referee: https://www.soccerway.com/match/eemdijk-EuuynYzA/rkav-volendam-xdoZWnj7/?mid=hCGBHW2H

1 November 2023	SVV Scheveningen	0–0 (a.e.t.) (3–4 p)	USV Hercules	Scheveningen
20:00 CET		Report		Stadium: Sportpark Houtrust

1 November 2023	Sparta Nijkerk	0–1	Fortuna Sittard	Nijkerk
20:00 CET		Report	Halilović 82' (pen.)	Stadium: Sportpark De Ebbenhorst

1 November 2023	Den Bosch	1–2 (a.e.t.)	Excelsior	's-Hertogenbosch
21:00 CET	Vicario 90+7'	Report	37' Horemans; 96' (pen.) Baas	Stadium: De Vliert

2 November 2023	Cambuur	4–1	MVV Maastricht	Leeuwarden
18:45 CET	Sylla 25'; Smit 28' (pen.); Breij 40'; Uldriķis 45'	Report	18' Buifrahi	Stadium: Cambuur Stadion

2 November 2023	TOP Oss	0–1	Eindhoven	Oss
20:00 CET		Report	61' (pen.) Amevor	Stadium: Frans Heesen Stadion

2 November 2023	VV SJC	1–3	Willem II	Noordwijk
20:00 CET	Van Trigt 11'	Report	15' Svensson; 19' St. Jago; 90+2' Hilterman	Stadium: Gemeentelijk Sportpark SJC

2 November 2023	NEC	5–3	Roda JC Kerkrade	Nijmegen
21:00 CET	Rober 9', 80'; Mattsson 22'; Van Rooij 24'; Hoedemakers 86'	Report	7', 37' Ouaissa; 42' Didden	Stadium: Goffertstadion

16 November 2023	Excelsior Maassluis	1–0	Volendam	Maassluis
20:00 CET	Ouali 20'	Report		Stadium: Sportpark Dijkpolder

== Second round ==
The second round consisted of 32 teams; the 27 winners from the first round, as well as the five Eredivisie clubs which automatically advanced to the second round due to their participation in European club competitions. The draw took place on 4 November 2023, with the matches being played on 19, 20, and 21 December 2023.

19 December 2023	Quick Boys	2–0	De Graafschap	Katwijk aan Zee
18:45 CET	Van Duijn 28', 76'	Report		Stadium: Sportpark Nieuw Zuid

19 December 2023	Eindhoven	0–2	Fortuna Sittard	Eindhoven
20:00 CET		Report	30' Noslin; 49' Sierhuis	Stadium: Jan Louwers Stadion

19 December 2023	SV Spakenburg	2–3 (a.e.t.)	Excelsior	Spakenburg
20:00 CET	El Azzouti 24', 64'	Report	36' Lamprou; 75' (o.g.) Artien; 99' Agrafiotis	Stadium: Sportpark De Westmaat

19 December 2023	Dordrecht	0–3	Cambuur	Dordrecht
20:00 CET		Report	24' Balk; 58' Uldriķis; 79' Van Kaam	Stadium: Matchoholic Stadion

19 December 2023	RKVV DEM	0–1	Excelsior Maassluis	Beverwijk
20:00 CET		Report	67' Fonseca	Stadium: Sportpark Adrichem

19 December 2023	Willem II	1–3	Groningen	Tilburg
21:00 CET	Bosch 56'	Report	21' Valente; 75' Duarte; 84' (pen.) Postema	Stadium: Koning Willem II Stadion

20 December 2023	ADO Den Haag	2–0	Sparta Rotterdam	The Hague
18:45 CET	Van Mieghem 5'; Ideho 88'	Report		Stadium: Bingoal Stadion

20 December 2023	GVVV	1–6	NEC	Veenendaal
20:00 CET	Burgering 64'	Report	3', 27' González; 11' Proper; 38' Tavşan; 42' Mattsson; 60' Ogawa	Stadium: Sportpark Panhuis

20 December 2023	RKAV Volendam	0–1	AFC	Volendam
20:00 CET		Report	62' Been	Stadium: KWABO-Stadion

20 December 2023	HHC Hardenberg	2–3 (a.e.t.)	AZ	Hardenberg
20:00 CET	Fatima 63'; Church 90+4'	Report	22' Pavlidis; 77' Odgaard; 102' Van Bommel	Stadium: Sportpark De Boshoek

20 December 2023	Feyenoord	2–1	Utrecht	Rotterdam
21:00 CET	Stengs 7'; Paixão 26'	Report	41' Booth	Stadium: De Kuip

21 December 2023	USV Hercules	3–2	Ajax	Utrecht
18:45 CET	Pieters 16', 66'; Grotenbreg 90+3'	Report	83' Brobbey; 89' Akpom	Stadium: Stadion Galgenwaard

21 December 2023	Go Ahead Eagles	7–1	De Treffers	Deventer
20:00 CET	Kornelis 16' (o.g.); Sow 19'; O. Edvardsen 26', 36'; V. Edvardsen 66'; Baeten 75', 84'	Report	49' Waterink	Stadium: De Adelaarshorst

21 December 2023	VV Katwijk	1–2	Almere City	Katwijk
20:00 CET	Doesburg 15'	Report	28' Cathline; 39' Hansen	Stadium: Sportpark De Krom

21 December 2023	Vitesse	1–0	SC Heerenveen	Arnhem
20:00 CET	Boutrah 86'	Report		Stadium: GelreDome

17 January 2024	PSV Eindhoven	3–1	Twente	Eindhoven
21:00 CET	Vertessen 19'; De Jong 55'; Bakayoko 61'	Report	68' Ugalde	Stadium: Philips Stadion; Attendance: 34,400; Referee: Jeroen Manschot

== Round of 16 ==
The 16 second round winners entered the Round of 16. The matches were played on 16, 17, 18, 24 and 25 January 2024.

16 January 2024	Excelsior Maassluis	1–2	ADO Den Haag	Rotterdam
18:45 CET	Dercks 1'	Report	83' Van der Sande; 90' Veerman	Stadium: Het Kasteel; Attendance: 3,500; Referee: Martijn Vos

16 January 2024	Excelsior	0–2	Groningen	Rotterdam
20:00 CET		Report	72', 78' Postema	Stadium: Stadion Woudestein; Attendance: 3,497; Referee: Martin van den Kerkhof

16 January 2024	AZ	3–3 (a.e.t.) (4–2 p)	Quick Boys	Alkmaar
21:00 CET	De Wit 70'; Poku 72'; Van Brederode 97'	Report	59' Nwankwo; 90+7' De Beste; 113' S. van Duijn	Stadium: AFAS Stadion; Attendance: 7,578; Referee: Edwin van de Graaf
	Penalties
	De Wit (penalty missed); Clasie (penalty scored); Pavlidis (penalty scored); Van Brederode (penalty scored); Odgaard (penalty scored)		(penalty scored) Van den Meiracker; (penalty missed) Franken; (penalty missed) L. van Duijn; (penalty scored) Nwankwo

17 January 2024	NEC Nijmegen	2–1	Go Ahead Eagles	Nijmegen
18:45 CET	Ogawa 35'; Van Wermeskerken 72'	Report	88' (o.g.) Roefs	Stadium: Goffertstadion; Attendance: 10,824; Referee: Bas Nijhuis

17 January 2024	Almere City	1–2	Fortuna Sittard	Almere
20:00 CET	Hansen 90+2'	Report	25', 42' Sierhuis	Stadium: Yanmar Stadion; Attendance: 3,513; Referee: Allard Lindhout

18 January 2024	Vitesse	1–0	AFC	Arnhem
18:45 CET	Pröpper 27'	Report		Stadium: GelreDome; Attendance: 7,778; Referee: Alex Bos

24 January 2024	Feyenoord	1–0	PSV	Rotterdam
20:00 CET	Timber 31'	Report		Stadium: De Kuip; Attendance: 47,500; Referee: Dennis Higler

25 January 2024	USV Hercules	3–4 (a.e.t.)	Cambuur	Utrecht
20:00 CET	Lahri 3' (pen.), 60'; Zwart 96'	Report	80', 93' Smit; 82' Nartey; 120+1' Breij	Stadium: Sportcomplex Zoudenbalch; Attendance: 1,100; Referee: Robin Hensgens

== Quarter-finals ==
The eight Round of 16 winners entered the quarter-finals. The matches were played on 6, 7 and 8 February 2024.

6 February 2024	NEC	3–0	ADO Den Haag	Nijmegen
20:00 CET	Ogawa 2'; Proper 61'; Chery 67'	Report		Stadium: Goffertstadion; Attendance: 10,651; Referee: Pol van Boekel

7 February 2024	Cambuur	3–1	Vitesse	Leeuwarden
18:45 CET	Smit 35', 88' (pen.); de Jong 81'	Report	79' Moussa	Stadium: Cambuur Stadion; Attendance: 9,697; Referee: Rob Dieperink

7 February 2024	Feyenoord	2–0	AZ	Rotterdam
21:00 CET	Geertruida 44'; Nieuwkoop 86'	Report		Stadium: De Kuip; Attendance: 47,500; Referee: Bas Nijhuis

8 February 2024	Groningen	0–0 (a.e.t.) (4–3 p)	Fortuna Sittard	Groningen
20:00 CET		Report		Stadium: Euroborg; Attendance: 21,709; Referee: Dennis Higler
	Penalties
	Postema (penalty scored); Bakker (penalty scored); Valente (penalty missed); Hove (penalty scored); Peersman (penalty scored)		(penalty scored) Peterson; (penalty missed) Özyakup; (penalty scored) Ferati; (penalty scored) Voet; (penalty missed) Belkheir

== Semi-finals ==
The four quarter-final winners entered the semi-finals. The matches were played on 27 and 29 February 2024.

27 February 2024	Cambuur	1–2 (a.e.t.)	NEC	Leeuwarden
20:00 CET	Uldriķis 24'	Report	60' Ogawa; 99' Sano	Stadium: Cambuur Stadion; Attendance: 10,000; Referee: Sander van der Eijk

29 February 2024	Feyenoord	2–1	Groningen	Rotterdam
20:00 CET	Hancko 61'; Lingr 83'	Report	31' Duarte	Stadium: De Kuip; Attendance: 47,500; Referee: Danny Makkelie

== Final ==
The final was held between the two semi-final winners.

21 April 2024
18:00 UTC+02:00

Feyenoord	1–0	NEC
Paixão 56'	Report

De Kuip, Rotterdam
Attendance: 42,140
Referee: Serdar Gözübüyük

== Top scorers ==
As of 29 February 2024

Rank	Player	Club	Goals
1	(Norway) Kornelius Normann Hansen	Almere City	5
1	(Netherlands) Milan Smit	Cambuur	5
3	(Spain) Rober	NEC	4
3	(Japan) Koki Ogawa	NEC	4
3	(Netherlands) Dave de Meij	Blauw Geel '38	4
3	(Netherlands) Thomas de Vries	DEM	4
3	(Netherlands) Sem van Duijn	Quick Boys	4
8	(Belgium) Thibo Baeten	Go Ahead Eagles	3
8	(Netherlands) Yannick Bouw	Eemdijk	3
8	(Norway) Oliver Valaker Edvardsen	Go Ahead Eagles	3
8	(Netherlands) Ahmed El Azzouti	Spakenburg	3
8	(Eritrea) Medhanie Habtemariam	Unitas	3
8	(Netherlands) Mouad Hassan	OJC	3
8	(Netherlands) Dennis Knuiman	IJsselmeervogels	3
8	(Austria) René Kriwak	Dordrecht	3
8	(Netherlands) Tim Pieters	Hercules	3
8	(Netherlands) Romano Postema	Groningen	3
8	(Netherlands) Kaj Sierhuis	Fortuna Sittard	3
8	(Netherlands) Pelle van Amersfoort	SC Heerenveen	3
8	(Latvia) Roberts Uldriķis	Cambuur	3
