= 2023–24 De Graafschap season =

De Graafschap
2023–24 season
- Manager: Jan Vreman
- Stadium: De Vijverberg
- Eerste Divisie: 6th
- Promotion play-offs: First round
- KNVB Cup: Second round
- Top goalscorer: League: Başar Önal (9); All: Başar Önal (9)
- Average home league attendance: 10,178

The 2023–24 season was De Graafschap's 70th season in existence and fifth consecutive in the second-tier Eerste Divisie. They also competed in the KNVB Cup.

== Players ==
=== First-team squad ===
As of 1 February 2024

Note: Flags indicate national team as defined under FIFA eligibility rules; some limited exceptions apply. Players may hold more than one non-FIFA nationality.

No.	Pos.	Nation	Player
1	GK	NED	Mees Bakker
3	DF	NED	Jan Lammers
4	DF	NED	Xandro Schenk
6	MF	NED	Lion Kaak
7	FW	SLO	David Flakus Bosilj (on loan from Verona)
8	MF	NED	Donny Warmerdam
9	FW	NED	Devin Haen
10	FW	MAR	Mimoun Mahi
11	FW	CAN	Simon Colyn
12	DF	NED	Jim van der Logt
14	DF	NED	Joran Hardeman
15	FW	NED	Ralf Seuntjens
16	GK	NED	Ties Wieggers
17	FW	NED	Elie Raterink
18	FW	NED	Giovanni Büttner
19	FW	NED	Hüseyin Doğan

No.	Pos.	Nation	Player
20	DF	NED	Rio Hillen
22	MF	CPV	Jeffry Fortes
23	MF	NED	Philip Brittijn
24	MF	NED	Maas Willemsen
25	DF	NED	Levi Schoppema
26	FW	IRQ	Blnd Hassan
28	DF	NED	Alexander Büttner
30	FW	NED	Tristan van Gilst
31	FW	NED	Sam Bisselink
33	FW	TUR	Başar Önal
34	MF	NED	Anis Yadir
35	GK	NED	Thijs Jansen (on loan from Feyenoord)
42	MF	NED	Stan Wevers
45	MF	NED	Ezra van der Heiden
48	GK	NED	Edwin Danquah
—	MF	SWE	Jardell Kanga (on loan from Bayer Leverkusen)

== Transfers ==
=== In ===
Pos.	Player	Transferred from	Fee	Date	Source

=== Out ===
Pos.	Player	Transferred to	Fee	Date	Source

== Pre-season and friendlies ==
Win Draw Loss Fixtures

8 July 2023 Friendly	De Graafschap (Netherlands)	3–2	(Netherlands) Quick Boys
14:00 CEST (UTC+2)

22 July 2023 Friendly	De Graafschap (Netherlands)	5–1	(Germany) 1. FC Bocholt
14:00 CEST (UTC+2)
Note: Match was played in two periods of sixty minutes each.

28 July 2023 Friendly	Groningen (Netherlands)	1–0	(Netherlands) De Graafschap
16:30 CEST (UTC+2)

29 July 2023 Friendly	MSV Duisburg (Germany)	2–1	(Netherlands) De Graafschap
14:00 CEST (UTC+2)

4 August 2023 Friendly	Den Bosch (Netherlands)	2–1	(Netherlands) De Graafschap
13:00 CEST (UTC+2)

5 August 2023 Friendly	De Graafschap (Netherlands)	3–1	(Netherlands) De Treffers
12:00 CEST (UTC+2)

== Competitions ==
=== Overall record ===
Competition	First match	Last match	Starting round	Final position	Record							
Competition	First match	Last match	Starting round	Final position	Pld	W	D	L	GF	GA	GD	Win %
Eerste Divisie	11 August 2023	10 May 2024	Matchday 1	6th	38	19	6	13	61	52	+9	50.00
Promotion play-offs	14 May 2024	18 May 2024	First round	First round	2	0	1	1	4	5	−1	0.00
KNVB Cup	31 October 2023	19 December 2023	First round	Second round	2	1	0	1	2	2	+0	50.00
Total					42	20	7	15	67	59	+8	47.62

Source: Soccerway

=== Eerste Divisie ===
==== League table ====
Pos	Team	Pld	W	D	L	GF	GA	GD	Pts	Promotion or qualification
4	Dordrecht	38	18	15	5	74	51	+23	69	Qualification for promotion play-offs
5	ADO Den Haag	38	17	12	9	72	50	+22	63	Qualification for promotion play-offs
6	De Graafschap	38	19	6	13	61	52	+9	63	Qualification for promotion play-offs
7	Emmen	38	17	6	15	59	60	−1	57	Qualification for promotion play-offs
8	NAC Breda (O, P)	38	15	11	12	63	56	+7	56	Qualification for promotion play-offs

Source: Flashscore, Keuken Kampioen Divisie (in Dutch)
Rules for classification: Season in progress: 1) Most points won; 2) Less points lost; 3) Goal difference; 4) Goals scored; 5) Alphabetical order; End of season: 1) Points; 2) Goal difference; 3) Goals scored; 4) Head-to-head points; 5) Head-to-head goal difference; 6) Head-to-head away goals scored; 7) Play-off if relevant for deciding champion, relegation or participating in a European league, otherwise by draw. 8) Penalty shoot-out (only after a play-off)
(O) Play-off winners; (P) Promoted

==== Results summary ====
Overall								Home						Away					
Pld	W	D	L	GF	GA	GD	Pts	W	D	L	GF	GA	GD	W	D	L	GF	GA	GD
38	19	6	13	61	52	+9	63	11	4	4	33	19	+14	8	2	9	28	33	−5

==== Results by round ====
Round	1	2	3	4	5	6	7	8	9	10	11	12	13	14	15	16	17	18	19	20	21	22	23	24	25	26	27	28	29	30	31	32	33	34	35	36	37	38
Ground	H	A	H	A	H	A	A	H	A	A	H	H	H	A	H	A	A	H	A	H	A	A	H	A	H	A	H	H	A	A	H	H	A	H	A	H	H	A
Result	D	W	L	L	W	W	W	D	L	L	W	W	W	W	D	L	W	L	W	W	L	W	W	D	L	L	W	W	W	L	L	W	L	W	D	W	D	L
Position	13	5	11	16	14	8	6	7	7	12	11	7	5	5	5	6	5	7	4	4	5	4	4	4	5	6	6	6	6	6	6	6	6	6	6	6	6	6

A = Away; H = Home; W = Win; D = Draw; L = Loss

==== Matches ====
The league fixtures were unveiled on 30 June 2023.

11 August 2023 1	De Graafschap	0–0	ADO Den Haag	Doetinchem
20:00 CEST (UTC+2)		Report		Stadium: De Vijverberg; Referee: Jannick van der Laan
