= 2022–23 De Graafschap season =

De Graafschap
2022–23 season
- Chairman: Martin Mos
- Head coach: Adrie Poldervaart
- Stadium: De Vijverberg
- Eerste Divisie: 10th
- KNVB Cup: Quarter-finals
- Top goalscorer: League: Camiel Neghli (11); All: Camiel Neghli (12)

The 2022–23 De Graafschap season was the club's 69th season in existence and the club's fourth consecutive season in the second-tier of Dutch football. In addition to the domestic league, De Graafschap participated in this season's edition of the KNVB Cup. The season covered the period from 1 July 2022 to 30 June 2023.

== Players ==
=== First-team squad ===
As of 30 January 2023

Note: Flags indicate national team as defined under FIFA eligibility rules; some limited exceptions apply. Players may hold more than one non-FIFA nationality.

No.	Pos.	Nation	Player
1	GK	NED	Hidde Jurjus
3	DF	NED	Jan Lammers
4	DF	NED	Xandro Schenk
6	MF	NED	Lion Kaak
10	MF	NED	Siem de Jong
11	FW	NED	Giovanni Korte
12	DF	NED	Jim van der Logt
14	MF	ALG	Camiel Neghli
16	GK	NED	Ties Wieggers
20	DF	NED	Rio Hillen
21	FW	ECU	Joel Valencia (on loan from Brentford)
22	MF	CPV	Jeffry Fortes
23	MF	NED	Philip Brittijn

No.	Pos.	Nation	Player
24	FW	NED	Mees Kaandorp
25	FW	NED	Levi Schoppema
26	MF	NED	Sisqo Lever
27	DF	NED	Robin Schouten (on loan from SønderjyskE)
28	DF	NED	Alexander Büttner
29	DF	NED	Joran Hardeman
30	FW	NED	Pim Lukassen
32	GK	NED	Mees Bakker (on loan from AZ)
33	FW	TUR	Başar Önal
34	MF	NED	Anis Yadir
35	FW	CUW	Charlison Benschop
44	MF	NED	Maas Willemsen
45	MF	NED	Ezra van der Heiden

==== Out on loan ====
Note: Flags indicate national team as defined under FIFA eligibility rules; some limited exceptions apply. Players may hold more than one non-FIFA nationality.

No. / Pos. / Nation / Player; — / DF / NED / Milan Hilderink (at TOP Oss until 30 June 2023)	No. / Pos. / Nation / Player; — / MF / NED / Jesse Schuurman (at Roda JC Kerkrade until 30 June 2023)

== Pre-season and friendlies ==
Win Draw Loss Fixtures

9 July 2022 Friendly	De Graafschap (Netherlands)	1–3	(Germany) Rot-Weiß Oberhausen	Aalten, Netherlands
14:30 CEST (UTC+2)				Stadium: Sportpark Villekamp

15 July 2022 Friendly	Willem II (Netherlands)	1–2	(Netherlands) De Graafschap	Oisterwijk
13:00 CEST (UTC+2)	Nshimirimana 75'		McCausland 70'; Lammers 79'	Stadium: Taxandria-velden
Note: The match was played in four quarters 30 minutes each.

19 July 2022 Friendly	De Graafschap (Netherlands)	3–2	(Netherlands) FC Emmen	Varsseveld, Netherlands
20:00 CEST (UTC+2)				Stadium: Sportpark Oberink

30 July 2022 Friendly	De Graafschap (Netherlands)	1–0	(Netherlands) Roda JC	Doetinchem, Netherlands
11:30 CEST (UTC+2)				Stadium: De Vijverberg

13 August 2022 Friendly	De Treffers (Netherlands)	1–2	(Netherlands) De Graafschap	Groesbeek, Netherlands
11:30 CEST (UTC+2)				Stadium: Sportpark Zuid veld 1

== Competitions ==
=== Overall record ===
Competition	First match	Last match	Starting round	Final position	Record							
Competition	First match	Last match	Starting round	Final position	Pld	W	D	L	GF	GA	GD	Win %
Eerste Divisie	7 August 2022	19 May 2023	Matchday 1	10th	38	15	7	16	28	32	−4	39.47
KNVB Cup	18 October 2022	2 March 2023	First round	Quarter-finals	4	3	0	1	11	5	+6	75.00
Total					42	18	7	17	39	37	+2	42.86

Source: Soccerway

=== Eerste Divisie ===
==== League table ====
Pos	Team	Pld	W	D	L	GF	GA	GD	Pts	Promotion or qualification
8	Eindhoven	38	16	10	12	58	54	+4	58	Qualification for promotion play-offs
9	Telstar	38	14	11	13	39	52	−13	53	
10	De Graafschap	38	15	7	16	64	54	+10	52	
11	Jong AZ	38	14	9	15	60	58	+2	51	Reserve teams are not eligible to be promoted to the Eredivisie
12	ADO Den Haag	38	13	12	13	51	57	−6	51	

Source: Soccerway, Keuken Kampioen Divisie (in Dutch)
Rules for classification: Season in progress: 1) Most points won; 2) Less points lost; 3) Goal difference; 4) Goals scored; 5) Alphabetical order; End of season: 1) Points; 2) Goal difference; 3) Goals scored; 4) Head-to-head points; 5) Head-to-head goal difference; 6) Head-to-head away goals scored; 7) Play-off if relevant for deciding champion, relegation or participating in a European league, otherwise by draw. 8) Penalty shoot-out (only after a play-off)

==== Results summary ====
Overall								Home						Away					
Pld	W	D	L	GF	GA	GD	Pts	W	D	L	GF	GA	GD	W	D	L	GF	GA	GD
38	15	7	16	64	54	+10	52	10	2	7	31	20	+11	5	5	9	33	34	−1

Source: Keuken Kampioen Divisie

==== Results by round ====
Round	1	2	3	4	5	6	7	8	9	10	11	12	13	14	15	16	17	18	19	20	21	22	23	24	25	26	27	28	29	30	31	32	33	34	35	36	37	38
Ground	A	H	A	H	A	H	H	A	H	A	H	A	H	A	H	A	H	H	A	H	A	A	H	A	H	A	H	A	A	H	A	H	A	H	A	H	A	H
Result	L	L	L	D	W	D	L	L	W	L	W	D	W	L	W	W	L	L	D	W	D	D	L	L	W	W	W	W	L	L	W	W	D	L	L	W	L	W
Position																																						

Source: Keuken Kampioen Divisie
A = Away; H = Home; W = Win; D = Draw; L = Loss

==== Matches ====
The league fixtures were announced on 17 June 2022.

1	De Graafschap	v	Doetinchem
CEST (UTC+2)			Stadium: De Vijverberg

=== KNVB Cup ===
18 October 2022 First round	Rijnsburgse Boys	1–3	De Graafschap	Rijnsburg
20:00 CET (UTC+1)	Van der Moot 69'	Report	Gravenberch 39'; Yadir 62'; Neghli 90+2'	Stadium: Middelmors; Referee: Robin Vereijken

10 January 2023 Second round	HV & CV Quick	1–4	De Graafschap	The Hague
20:00 CET (UTC+1)	Massar 22'	Report	De Jong 2'; Schouten 18'; Önal 34'; Brittijn 73'	Stadium: Sportpark Nieuw Hanenburg; Referee: Laurens Gerrets

7 February 2023 Round of 16	De Graafschap	3–0	De Treffers	Doetinchem
20:00 CET (UTC+1)	Önal 49'; Korte 57'; Benschop 77'	Report		Stadium: De Vijverberg; Attendance: 8,075; Referee: Sander van der Eijk

2 March 2023 Round of 16	De Graafschap	0–3	Ajax	Doetinchem
21:00 CET (UTC+1)		Report	Sánchez 12'; Bergwijn 26'; Brobbey 78'	Stadium: De Vijverberg; Attendance: 12,500; Referee: Allard Lindhout
