= Levi Schoppema =

Dutch footballer (born 2004)

Personal information
- Date of birth: 27 May 2004 (age 22)
- Place of birth: Doetinchem, Netherlands
- Height: 1.79 m (5 ft 10 in)
- Positions: Left-back; winger

Team information
- Current team: De Graafschap
- Number: 5

Youth career
- –2013: DZC '68
- 2013–2023: De Graafschap

Senior career*
Years	Team	Apps	(Gls)
2023–	De Graafschap	99	(2)
- * Club domestic league appearances and goals as of 28 April 2026

Levi Schoppema (born 27 May 2004) is a Dutch professional footballer who plays as a left-back for Eerste Divisie club De Graafschap.

== Career ==
Born in Doetinchem, Schoppema started playing football for local club DZC '68 before joining the academy of the town's professional club De Graafschap in 2013. He started his career as a winger and attacking midfielder, modeling his game after Sergio Agüero.

In July 2022, Schoppema signed his first professional contract with the club, securing a deal that extended until 2025. At the same time, he earned a promotion to the first team, setting the stage for his involvement in the upcoming 2022–23 season. He made his first-team debut on 10 January 2023, during the second round of the KNVB Cup in a 4–1 away victory against HV & CV Quick, replacing Başar Önal in the 91st minute. After multiple instances of being on the bench with the squad, he finally made his debut in the Eerste Divisie on 6 March 2023, during the 2–0 home victory against Helmond Sport. He entered the match as a substitute for Alexander Büttner in the 83rd minute.

Schoppema began establishing himself as a left-back for De Graafschap during the 2023–24 season under head coach Jan Vreman, alternating with Büttner for the starting position.

== Career statistics ==
As of match played 9 May 2026

Appearances and goals by club, season and competition
Club	Season	League			KNVB Cup		Other		Total	
Club	Season	Division	Apps	Goals	Apps	Goals	Apps	Goals	Apps	Goals
De Graafschap	2022–23	Eerste Divisie	6	0	1	0	—		7	0
De Graafschap	2023–24	Eerste Divisie	23	0	2	0	1 (Note: Appearance(s) in Eredivisie play-offs)	0	26	0
De Graafschap	2024–25	Eerste Divisie	33	1	1	0	2	0	36	1
De Graafschap	2025–26	Eerste Divisie	37	1	1	0	2	0	40	1
De Graafschap	2026–27	Eerste Divisie	0	0	0	0	—		0	0
Career total			99	2	5	0	5	0	109	2
