= Elie Raterink =

Dutch footballer (born 2004)

Personal information
- Date of birth: 14 May 2004 (age 22)
- Place of birth: Winterswijk, Netherlands
- Position: Striker

Team information
- Current team: Blauw Geel '38
- Number: 17

Youth career
- FC Trias
- Twente
- –2020: FC Trias
- 2020–2025: De Graafschap

Senior career*
Years	Team	Apps	(Gls)
2023–2025	De Graafschap	16	(1)
2025	FC Winterswijk	?	(2)
2026–	Blauw Geel '38	0	(0)
- * Club domestic league appearances and goals as of 11:19, 1 November 2026 (UTC)

Elie Raterink (born 14 May 2004) is a Dutch footballer who plays as a striker for Derde Divisie club Blauw Geel '38.

Raterink came through the youth system at De Graafschap and scored on his professional debut in February 2023. He made 16 Eerste Divisie appearances before his contract was terminated in February 2025. After a spell with amateur club FC Winterswijk in his hometown, he joined Blauw Geel '38 in 2026.

== Early life ==
Raterink was born in Winterswijk, Gelderland, and began playing football at local club FC Trias. He joined the youth academy of Twente in 2016. He did not break through at Twente and returned to FC Trias before moving to De Graafschap's academy.

== Club career ==
=== De Graafschap ===
Raterink made his professional debut on 24 February 2023, replacing Devin Haen in the 61st minute of a 4–0 away win against FC Eindhoven. He scored on his debut. He also played in the KNVB Cup quarter-final against Ajax that season. On 9 March 2023, he signed his first professional contract, a three-year deal. Technical manager Peter Bijvelds described him as a big, strong striker who was also quick. Raterink spent the rest of the season as Haen's understudy.

His playing time fell in the 2023–24 season after the signing of Ralf Seuntjens. In January 2024, he went on trial with German Regionalliga club SG Barockstadt Fulda-Lehnerz. He played in a friendly against SpVgg Greuther Fürth II on 23 January 2024. The trial did not lead to a transfer, and he returned to De Graafschap.

Raterink played for De Graafschap's reserve team in the 2024–25 season. In December 2024, he was arrested by Belgian police on suspicion of involvement in a bank helpdesk fraud against an elderly woman. A court in Leuven confirmed his pre-trial detention. A De Graafschap spokesperson said the club did not know exactly what had happened.

On 13 February 2025, De Graafschap and Raterink agreed to terminate his contract, which had been due to run until July 2026. He made 16 league appearances for the club.

=== FC Winterswijk ===
After leaving De Graafschap, Raterink joined FC Winterswijk, an amateur club in his hometown. He scored two league goals for the club.

=== Blauw Geel '38 ===
In June 2026, Raterink signed for Derde Divisie club Blauw Geel '38 of Veghel. He was one of the last additions to the squad of head coach Maurice Verbunt, who had been looking for a new centre-forward. The club's technical committee described him as a fast and physically very strong forward with a keen eye for goal.

== Personal life ==
Raterink's younger brother, Othniël Raterink, is also a professional footballer.

== Career statistics ==
As of match played 8 December 2023

Appearances and goals by club, season and competition
Club	Season	League			KNVB Cup		Other		Total	
Club	Season	Division	Apps	Goals	Apps	Goals	Apps	Goals	Apps	Goals
De Graafschap	2022–23	Eerste Divisie	10	1	1	0	—		11	1
De Graafschap	2023–24	Eerste Divisie	6	0	1	0	0	0	7	0
Career total			16	1	2	0	0	0	18	1
