= Ricky Bochem =

Dutch footballer

Personal information
- Date of birth: 18 October 1982 (age 44)
- Place of birth: Nijmegen, Netherlands
- Position: Midfielder

Youth career
- SJN
- NEC Amateurs

Senior career*
Years	Team	Apps	(Gls)
2002-2004	Vitesse	19	(1)
2004-2007	Helmond Sport	57	(1)
2008-2010	De Treffers		
- * Club domestic league appearances and goals

Ricky Bochem (born 18 October 1982 in the Netherlands) is a Dutch retired footballer.

After playing for amateur side SJN and in the NEC academy, he signed professional terms with Vitesse and later ended up with Helmond Sport in an injury-ridden career.

After retiring, Bochem became an acupuncturist.
