= Joran Hardeman =

Dutch footballer (born 2002)

Personal information
- Date of birth: 21 April 2002 (age 24)
- Place of birth: Veenendaal, Netherlands
- Height: 1.90 m (6 ft 3 in)
- Position: Centre-back

Team information
- Current team: De Graafschap
- Number: 14

Youth career
- –2016: GVVV
- 2016–2017: Utrecht
- 2017–2023: De Graafschap

Senior career*
Years	Team	Apps	(Gls)
2023–	De Graafschap	36	(2)
- * Club domestic league appearances and goals as of 28 April 2026

Joran Hardeman (born 21 April 2002) is a Dutch professional footballer who plays as a centre-back for Eerste Divisie club De Graafschap.

== Career ==
Born in Veenendaal, Province of Utrecht, Hardeman started playing youth football career at hometown club GVVV before moving to the youth academy of Utrecht. After his time at Utrecht, he transitioned to the youth academy of De Graafschap.

In April 2023, he signed his first professional contract with De Graafschap until the summer of 2024, with an option for an additional year. That same month, on 21 April 2023, Hardeman made his professional debut in the home match against ADO Den Haag, replacing Jan Lammers in the 82nd minute of a 1–0 home loss.

Hardeman had his breakthrough season for De Graafschap during the 2023–24 season under the guidance of head coach Jan Vreman. He made his first start on 31 October 2023, in a KNVB Cup victory over Emmen, contributing to his club's clean sheet. Since then, he solidified his position as a starting centre-back, establishing himself in the team from January 2024 onwards.

== Career statistics ==
As of match played 29 August 2026

Appearances and goals by club, season and competition
Club	Season	League			KNVB Cup		Other		Total	
Club	Season	Division	Apps	Goals	Apps	Goals	Apps	Goals	Apps	Goals
De Graafschap	2022–23	Eerste Divisie	1	0	0	0	—		1	0
De Graafschap	2023–24	Eerste Divisie	19	0	2	0	2 (Note: Appearances in Eredivisie play-offs)	0	23	0
De Graafschap	2024–25	Eerste Divisie	10	1	1	0	0	0	11	1
De Graafschap	2025–26	Eerste Divisie	6	1	0	0	2	0	6	1
De Graafschap	2026–27	Eerste Divisie	4	0	0	0	—		4	0
Career total			40	2	3	0	4	0	47	2
