= Othniël Raterink =

Dutch footballer (born 2005)

Personal information
- Date of birth: 7 April 2006 (age 20)
- Place of birth: Winterswijk, Netherlands
- Height: 1.89 m (6 ft 2 in)
- Position: Right-back

Team information
- Current team: ADO Den Haag (on loan from Cagliari)
- Number: 2

Youth career
- –2024: De Graafschap
- 2024–2025: → Bayer Leverkusen (loan)

Senior career*
| Years | Team | Apps | (Gls) |
| 2024–2026 | De Graafschap | 24 | (3) |
| 2024–2025 | → Bayer Leverkusen (loan) | 0 | (0) |
| 2026– | Cagliari | 1 | (0) |
| 2026–2027 | → ADO Den Haag (loan) | 8 | (0) |

International career^{‡}
| 2023 | Netherlands U17 | 3 | (1) |
| 2023 | Netherlands U18 | 3 | (0) |
| 2024 | Netherlands U19 | 3 | (0) |
- * Club domestic league appearances and goals as of 17 October 2026 ‡ National team caps and goals as of 19 November 2024

Othniël Raterink (born 7 April 2006) is a Dutch professional footballer who plays as a right-back for Eredivisie club ADO Den Haag, on loan from Serie A club Cagliari.

== Early life ==
Raterink was born on 7 April 2006 in Winterswijk, Netherlands. A native of the city, he is the younger brother of Dutch footballer Elie Raterink.

== Club career ==
Raterink started his career with Dutch side De Graafschap, where he made one league appearance and scored one goal. Ahead of the 2024–25 season, he was sent on loan to Bundesliga side Bayer Leverkusen. Following his stint there, he signed for Serie A side Cagliari in 2026.

On 12 August 2026, it was announced that he had joined ADO Den Haag on loan for the 2026–27 season, with ADO Den Haag securing an option to buy him at the end of the season.

== International career ==
Raterink is a Netherlands youth international. During May 2023, he played for the Netherlands national under-17 football team at the 2023 UEFA European Under-17 Championship.

== Style of play ==
Raterink plays as a defender and is right-footed. Italian news website CagliariToday wrote in 2026 that he "can play both in a four-man back line and as a full-back in a three-man defense. He has a predominantly attacking mentality, due to his physical and technical characteristics. Raterink is 191 centimeters tall, but despite his height and impressive physicality, he boasts truly impressive pace, allowing him to often be found ready in the attacking zone, racking up the aforementioned stats... [he] can cross fairly well and shoot on goal equally well".

== Career statistics ==
As of match played 27 October 2026

Appearances and goals by club, season and competition
| Club | Season | League | | | Cup | | Europe | | Other | | Total | |
| Club | Season | Division | Apps | Goals | Apps | Goals | Apps | Goals | Apps | Goals | Apps | Goals |
|---|---|---|---|---|---|---|---|---|---|---|---|---|
| De Graafschap | 2023–24 | Eerste Divisie | 1 | 0 | — | | — | | — | | 1 | 0 |
| De Graafschap | 2025–26 | Eerste Divisie | 23 | 3 | 1 | 0 | — | | — | | 24 | 3 |
| De Graafschap | Total | | 24 | 3 | 1 | 0 | — | | 25 | 3 | | |
| Bayer Leverkusen (loan) | 2024–25 | Bundesliga | 0 | 0 | 0 | 0 | 0 | 0 | 0 | 0 | 0 | 0 |
| Cagliari | 2025–26 | Serie A | 1 | 0 | — | | — | | — | | 1 | 0 |
| ADO Den Haag | 2026–27 | Eredivisie | 8 | 0 | 1 | 0 | — | | — | | 9 | 0 |
| Career total | | | 33 | 3 | 2 | 0 | 0 | 0 | 0 | 0 | 35 | 3 |
