= Doetinchem Stadion railway station =

Closed railway station in the Netherlands

Coordinates: 51.9551°N 6.3088°E

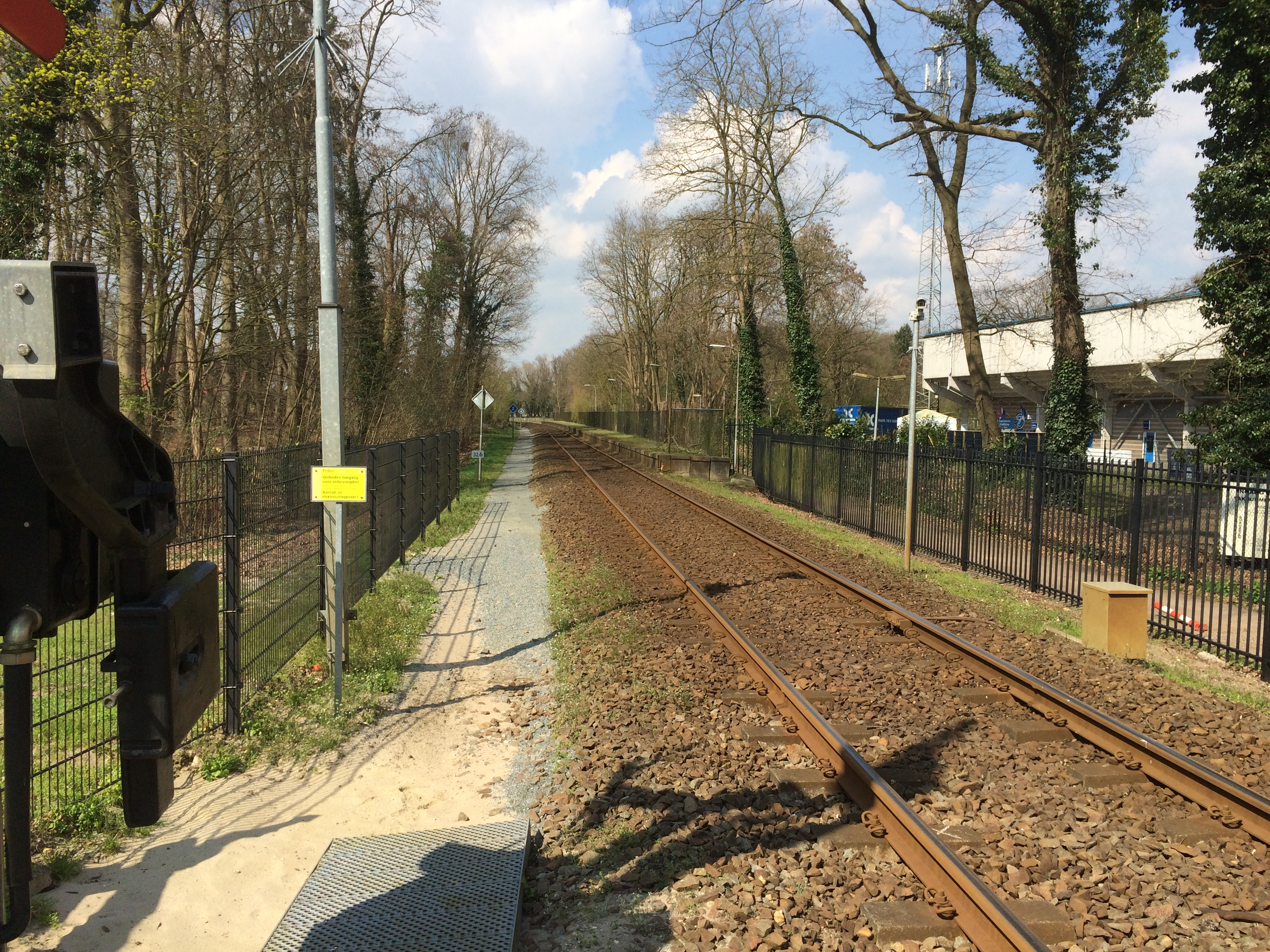
The platform of the former station Doetinchem Stadion

Doetinchem Stadion was a stop on the Winterswijk–Zevenaar railway in Doetinchem, Netherlands. It was for spectators going to the De Graafschap football club's De Vijverberg stadium. It was opened in 1992 and was only used for important matches. It closed in 2005, with the platform being removed in 2021.
