= Rio Hillen =

Dutch footballer (born 2003)

Personal information
- Date of birth: 5 March 2003 (age 23)
- Place of birth: Amsterdam, Netherlands
- Height: 1.87 m (6 ft 2 in)
- Position: Centre-back

Team information
- Current team: NAC Breda
- Number: 22

Youth career
- –2014: AFC
- 2014–2019: AZ
- 2019–2020: Ajax

Senior career*
Years	Team	Apps	(Gls)
2020–2022	Jong Ajax	25	(0)
2022–2025	De Graafschap	87	(4)
2025–	NAC Breda	26	(0)

International career
2017–2018	Netherlands U15	5	(1)
2019	Netherlands U17	4	(0)
- * Club domestic league appearances and goals as of 21 May 2026

Rio Hillen (born 5 March 2003) is a Dutch professional footballer who plays as a centre-back for Eerste Divisie club NAC Breda.

== Club career ==
=== Early years ===
Hillen started playing football in the youth teams of AFC. In 2014 he transitioned to the youth academy of AZ.

On 11 June 2019, he furthered his development by joining Ajax. Following his move to Ajax, he maintained his presence in the U17 squad, notching two goals in 17 games. In the subsequent season, alongside appearances for U18 and U19, he made his debut for Jong Ajax in the Eerste Divisie as a substitute in stoppage time for Terrence Douglas during a 5–1 victory over MVV. Subsequently, Hillen began to feature more regularly in the reserve team.

=== De Graafschap ===
On 22 June 2022, Hillen signed a two-year contract with De Graafschap. He made his debut for the club on 7 August, the first matchday of the season, starting in a 2–1 loss to PEC Zwolle. On 30 January 2023, he scored his first professional goal, equalising in the 58th minute of a 1–1 draw against Jong Utrecht. He remained a starter for the remainder of the season, scoring twice in 39 appearances.

In October 2023, Hillen faced a setback with a knee injury during an away game against Jong AZ. The injury required surgery and kept him out of action for several months.

=== NAC Breda ===
On 18 June 2025, Hillen signed a four-year contract with Eredivisie club NAC Breda.

== International career ==
Born in the Netherlands, Hillen is of Brazilian descent through his mother. He is a youth international for the Netherlands.

== Career statistics ==
As of match played 1 November 2025

Appearances and goals by club, season and competition
Club	Season	League			KNVB Cup		Other		Total	
Club	Season	Division	Apps	Goals	Apps	Goals	Apps	Goals	Apps	Goals
Jong Ajax	2020–21	Eerste Divisie	8	0	—		—		8	0
Jong Ajax	2021–22	Eerste Divisie	17	0	—		—		17	0
Jong Ajax	Total		25	0	—		—		25	0
De Graafschap	2022–23	Eerste Divisie	36	2	3	0	—		39	2
De Graafschap	2023–24	Eerste Divisie	14	0	0	0	2 (Note: Appearances in Eredivisie play-offs)	0	16	0
De Graafschap	2024–25	Eerste Divisie	37	2	2	0	2	0	39	2
De Graafschap	Total		87	4	5	0	4	0	96	4
NAC Breda	2025–26	Eredivisie	10	0	0	0	—		10	0
Career total			122	4	5	0	4	0	131	4
