= Anis Yadir =

Dutch footballer (born 2004)

Personal information
- Date of birth: 29 October 2004 (age 22)
- Place of birth: Zutphen, Netherlands
- Position: Midfielder

Team information
- Current team: GVVV

Youth career
- –2015: Be Quick Zutphen
- 2015–2022: De Graafschap

Senior career*
Years	Team	Apps	(Gls)
2022–2025	De Graafschap	20	(3)
2025–	De Treffers	23	(4)
- * Club domestic league appearances and goals as of 14:31, 27 May 2026 (UTC)

Anis Yadir (born 29 October 2004) is a Dutch professional footballer who plays as a midfielder for Tweede Divisie club GVVV.

== Career ==
=== De Graafschap ===
In June 2022, Yadir was promoted to first-team training at De Graafschap after signing a three-year professional contract with the club. He made his senior debut on 18 October 2022 in a KNVB Cup fixture against Rijnsburgse Boys, scoring in a 3–1 victory.

On 11 November 2022, he made his Eerste Divisie debut against Jong PSV at De Vijverberg, scoring the winning goal in stoppage time to secure a 3–2 win.

He remained with the club through the 2024–25 season. Upon the expiry of his contract, De Graafschap opted not to renew, and Yadir left the club as a free agent.

=== De Treffers ===
On 2 September 2025, Yadir joined Tweede Divisie side De Treffers, competing in Dutch amateur football. He made his debut four days later, coming on as a 68th-minute substitute for Sebastiaan van Bakel in a 1–0 away defeat to HHC Hardenberg. On 18 October, he scored his first goals for the club—two in a 2–2 away draw with BVV Barendrecht.

== Personal life ==
Born in the Netherlands, Yadir is of Moroccan descent.

== Career statistics ==
As of match played 30 October 2025

Appearances and goals by club, season and competition
Club	Season	League			KNVB Cup		Other		Total	
Club	Season	Division	Apps	Goals	Apps	Goals	Apps	Goals	Apps	Goals
De Graafschap	2022–23	Eerste Divisie	5	1	1	1	—		6	2
De Graafschap	2023–24	Eerste Divisie	12	1	1	0	0	0	13	1
De Graafschap	2024–25	Eerste Divisie	3	1	1	0	—		4	1
De Graafschap	Total		20	3	3	1	0	0	23	4
De Treffers	2025–26	Tweede Divisie	8	2	1	1	—		9	3
Career total			28	5	4	2	0	0	32	7
