= Coen Maertzdorf =

Dutch footballer (born 1993)

Personal information
- Date of birth: 24 August 1993 (age 33)
- Place of birth: Zevenaar, Netherlands
- Height: 1.88 m (6 ft 2 in)
- Position: Winger

Team information
- Current team: Kozakken Boys
- Number: 10

Youth career
- 1997–2001: RKPSC
- 2001–2012: De Graafschap

Senior career*
Years	Team	Apps	(Gls)
2012–2014	De Graafschap	11	(0)
2014–2023	De Treffers	246	(43)
2024–2025	Kozakken Boys	46	(6)
2025–	De Treffers	19	(0)
- * Club domestic league appearances and goals as of 16:58, 4 March 2026 (UTC)

Coen Maertzdorf (born 24 August 1993) is a Dutch footballer who plays as a winger for Tweede Divisie club De Treffers. He formerly played for De Graafschap and Kozakken Boys.

== Career ==
Born in Zevenaar, Gelderland, Maertzdorf started playing football at amateur club RKPSC, before moving to De Graafschap's youth academy in 2001, as an eight-year-old. He progressed through the club's youth teams and in 2012, he earned a spot in the first-team squad. He made his professional debut for the club on 10 August 2012 in the home match versus Excelsior, replacing Soufian El Hassnaoui in the second half of a 2–0 win. After a season at the club, he was offered a trial at Middlesbrough, but De Graafschap cancelled it last-minute due to the possibility of him starting. Subsequently, the club signed another player for his position.

In June 2014, Maertzdorf transitioned to amateur football after struggling to break through at De Graafschap. He signed with De Treffers, a Sunday Topklasse club. Following his first season, they moved to the newly implemented Derde Divisie, where they earned immediate promotion to the third-tier Tweede Divisie after one season.

After amassing more than 250 total appearances for De Treffers between 2014 and 2023, Maertzdorf joined Kozakken Boys in December 2023. Although he had been with the club for nine and a half years, he expressed a desire for a new challenge, especially after losing his starting spot in the lineup. He made his debut for the club on 13 January 2024, providing an assist for other newcomer Dico Jap Tjong in a 2–1 home loss to Rijnsburgse Boys.

On 24 January 2025, Maertzdorf agreed to return to De Treffers ahead of the 2025–26 season.

On 19 February 2026, it was confirmed that he would join fellow Groesbeek club Germania Groesbeek, who compete in the eighth-tier Derde Klasse, ahead of the 2026–27 season.

== Personal life ==
At the age of 14, on 2 October 2007, Maertzdorf was involved in a serious car accident that resulted in a head injury and left him in a coma for three days. As a result, he was unable to play football for nearly a year.

After transitioning to amateur football, Maertzdorf pursued a civil career alongside his football endeavors. As of 2021, he has been working as a personal support worker for individuals with mild intellectual disabilities and severe behavioral problems.
