= Lion Kaak =

Dutch footballer (born 1991)

Personal information
- Date of birth: 26 June 1991 (age 35)
- Place of birth: Hengelo, Netherlands
- Height: 1.78 m (5 ft 10 in)
- Position: Midfielder

Team information
- Current team: MASV

Youth career
- Pax Hengelo
- 2001–2009: De Graafschap

Senior career*
Years	Team	Apps	(Gls)
2009–2012	De Graafschap	11	(0)
2012–2013	AGOVV	13	(0)
2013	Go Ahead Eagles	5	(0)
2013–2014	Valencia B	6	(0)
2014–2015	Achilles '29	19	(0)
2015–2017	De Graafschap	42	(0)
2017–2022	TOP Oss	161	(4)
2022–2025	De Graafschap	53	(0)
2025–	MASV		

International career
2007	Netherlands U16	3	(0)
- * Club domestic league appearances and goals

Lion Kaak (born 26 June 1991) is a Dutch footballer who plays as a midfielder for Vierde Divisie club MASV.

== Club career ==
Kaak played as a youth for Pax Hengelo and then joined local Eredivisie side De Graafschap in 2001. He progressed through the youth system until he was promoted to the first team in 2009. Two years later, Kaak made his professional debut for the club, on 13 March 2011 in a home match against ADO Den Haag, where he replaced Gregor Breinburg.

In June 2012, Kaak signed a two-year contract with AGOVV. Six months later, in January 2013, the club went bankrupt and he joined Go Ahead Eagles on a free until the end of the season. In the summer of 2013, he trained with his former club, De Graafschap. In July 2013, Kaak signed with Spanish club Valencia CF Mestalla, the reserve team of Valencia CF. He also trained several times with the Valencia first team and on the last matchday of the 2013–14 season, he sat on the bench. However, he did not make an appearance.

In 2014, he returned to the Netherlands, where he began playing for second-tier Eerste Divisie club Achilles '29. In the first league match on 9 August against Jong PSV (0–2 away loss), Kaak made his debut in the starting lineup, where he would remain in the following months. On 1 December, he provided an assist from a corner kick to Mehmet Dingil against FC Volendam. Because he played for Achilles '29 on an amateur basis, he was able to sign on a free transfer with his childhood club, De Graafschap, in January 2015, on a one-and-a-half-year contract. On 27 January 2015, Kaak made his official return to the club as a 83rd-minute substitute in a 2–0 away win over SC Telstar.

In the summer of 2017, Kaak moved to FC Oss, which became TOP Oss from 1 July 2018. In 2019, he signed a contract extension, which would keep him in Oss until 2022.

On 20 June 2022, De Graafschap announced that Kaak would return to the club for the 2022–23 season, marking his third spell in Doetinchem.

In May 2025, he announced his retirement from professional football. Kaak chose to continue his career at amateur level with MASV in the Vierde Divisie, having recently accepted a position with his former club De Graafschap as head of youth scouting and under-15 coach for the 2025–26 season. Because of the demands of this role, a planned move to Spakenburg—who compete at a higher level of amateur football—did not materialise.

== International career ==
Kaak has represented the Netherlands at under-16 level, gaining his first cap as a starter in a friendly against Italy on 14 March 2007, before being replaced by Cayfano Latupeirissa in the 58th minute of a 2–1 loss.

== Style of play ==
Kaak is right-footed. He typically plays as a defensive midfielder. During his time with TOP Oss, he has been described as a strong personality on the pitch who is "guarding the standards, values and mentality of the club".

== Career statistics ==
Appearances and goals by club, season and competition
Club	Season	League			Cup		Other		Total	
Club	Season	Division	Apps	Goals	Apps	Goals	Apps	Goals	Apps	Goals
De Graafschap	2009–10	Eerste Divisie	0	0	3	0	—		3	0
De Graafschap	2010–11	Eredivisie	2	0	0	0	—		2	0
De Graafschap	2011–12	Eredivisie	9	0	1	0	2 (Note: Appearances in the Eredivisie promotion/relegation play-offs)	0	12	0
De Graafschap	Total		11	0	4	0	2	0	17	0
AGOVV	2012–13	Eerste Divisie	13	0	0	0	—		13	0
Go Ahead Eagles	2012–13	Eerste Divisie	5	0	0	0	4	0	9	0
Valencia B	2013–14	Segunda División B	8	0	0	0	—		8	0
Achilles '29	2014–15	Eerste Divisie	19	0	1	0	—		20	0
De Graafschap	2014–15	Eerste Divisie	11	0	0	0	3	0	2	0
De Graafschap	2015–16	Eredivisie	14	0	0	0	0	0	14	0
De Graafschap	2016–17	Eerste Divisie	17	0	1	0	—		18	0
De Graafschap	Total		42	1	1	0	3	0	46	1
TOP Oss	2017–18	Eerste Divisie	27	0	1	0	—		28	0
TOP Oss	2018–19	Eerste Divisie	36	0	2	0	2	0	40	0
TOP Oss	2019–20	Eerste Divisie	28	2	3	0	—		31	2
TOP Oss	2020–21	Eerste Divisie	35	1	0	0	—		35	1
TOP Oss	2021–22	Eerste Divisie	35	1	1	0	—		36	1
TOP Oss	Total		161	4	7	0	2	0	170	3
De Graafschap	2022–23	Eerste Divisie	20	0	1	0	—		21	0
De Graafschap	2023–24	Eerste Divisie	22	0	2	0	2	0	26	0
De Graafschap	2024–25	Eerste Divisie	11	0	2	0	—		13	0
De Graafschap	Total		53	0	5	0	2	0	60	0
Career total			312	5	19	0	13	0	344	4
