= Jorn van Hedel =

Dutch footballer (born 2000)

Personal information
- Date of birth: 20 October 2000 (age 26)
- Place of birth: Berlicum, Netherlands
- Height: 1.78 m (5 ft 10 in)
- Position: Right-back

Team information
- Current team: De Treffers
- Number: 12

Youth career
- BMC
- –2014: Den Bosch
- 2014–2017: Brabant United
- 2017–2020: Den Bosch

Senior career*
Years	Team	Apps	(Gls)
2020–2023	Den Bosch	60	(0)
2023–	De Treffers	75	(3)
- * Club domestic league appearances and goals as of 3 October 2026

Jorn van Hedel (born 20 October 2000) is a Dutch professional footballer who plays as a right-back for Tweede Divisie club De Treffers.

== Club career ==
Born in Berlicum, Van Hedel started his career in the youth of local club BMC, before moving the FC Den Bosch academy. In April 2014, he joined talent academy Brabant United, before making the move back to the Den Bosch youth system in 2017. He was promoted to the first team in the summer of 2020, after having played two seasons for the U21 team in the Hoofdklasse, among others. He made his full senior debut in the Eerste Divisie on 6 September 2020, in the 2–1 home win over FC Dordrecht. He started at right back and played the full match.

On 25 June 2023, Van Hedel signed with De Treffers in the Tweede Divisie.
