= Xandro Schenk =

Dutch footballer (born 1993)

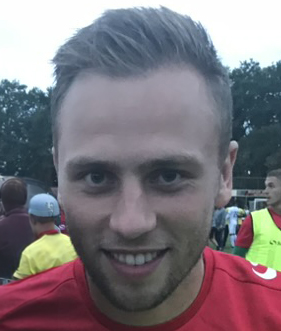
- Schenk in 2018

Personal information
- Date of birth: 28 April 1993 (age 33)
- Place of birth: Almere, Netherlands
- Height: 1.88 m (6 ft 2 in)
- Position: Centre-back

Youth career
- –2001: Omniworld
- 2001–2013: Ajax

Senior career*
Years	Team	Apps	(Gls)
2012–2013	Ajax	0	(0)
2013	→ Go Ahead Eagles (loan)	15	(0)
2013–2018	Go Ahead Eagles	153	(10)
2018–2020	Twente	36	(1)
2020–2021	Al Batin	25	(0)
2021–2022	Vendsyssel	25	(0)
2022–2024	De Graafschap	58	(6)
2024–2025	Septemvri Sofia	23	(4)
2025–2026	Persis Solo	16	(2)
2026	Intercity	5	(0)
- * Club domestic league appearances and goals as of 21 June 2026

Xandro Schenk (born 28 April 1993) is a Dutch professional footballer who plays as a centre-back.

== Club career ==
=== Ajax ===
Schenk joined the youth ranks of the Amsterdam club from Omniworld in 2001, working his way up the youth ranks, he signed his first professional contract with Ajax in the summer of 2012, a two-year contract which tied him to the club until the summer of 2014. Starting his professional career in the reserve squad Jong Ajax, playing in the Beloften Eredivisie. Unable to break into the first team, Schenk was then subsequently loaned out to Go Ahead Eagles during the winter transfer window, playing in the Eerste Divisie, the second tier of professional football in the Netherlands for the remainder of the 2012–13 season.

=== Go Ahead Eagles ===
In Deventer, Schenk played a strong remainder of the season during his loan spell from Ajax. Making 15 appearances for his new club as a centre-back, Schenk helped his side to get promoted to the Eredivisie by the end of the season. He played his first match for Go Ahead Eagles on 1 February 2013 in a 1–0 loss at home against Den Bosch. Finishing the season sixth in the table, his team qualified for the promotion/relegation playoffs, where his side was able to secure promotion with Schenk playing in all six playoff matches.

Following his successful stint with the Go Ahead Eagles, he was transferred to the club permanently from Ajax during the summer break on 14 June 2013, signing a two-year contract with the newly promoted club. He made his Eredivisie debut in the 1–1 draw against Utrecht on 4 August 2013 at the Stadion Galgenwaard. He scored his first goal six days later against ADO Den Haag on 10 August 2013 in a 2–1 win at home, scoring the opening goal in the 21st minute.

=== Twente ===
On 17 July 2018, Schenk signed with Twente on a two-year contract.

=== Vendsyssel FF ===
After a spell in Saudi Arabia with Al Batin, Schenk moved to Denmark, signing a deal until June 2023 with Danish 1st Division club Vendsyssel FF on 17 August 2021.

=== De Graafschap ===
After a season in Denmark, Schenk returned to his homeland on 17 June 2022, signing a two-year contract with Eerste Divisie club De Graafschap. He scored several goals in the spring of 2024, including a brace against Telstar on 12 April.

== Career statistics ==
As of match played on 4 January 2026

Appearances and goals by club, season and competition
Club	Season	League			National cup		Europe		Other		Total	
Club	Season	Division	Apps	Goals	Apps	Goals	Apps	Goals	Apps	Goals	Apps	Goals
Ajax	2012–13	Eredivisie	0	0	0	0	0	0	—		0	0
Go Ahead Eagles (loan)	2012–13	Eerste Divisie	15	0	0	0	—		6 (Note: Appearance(s) in Eredivisie promotion/relegation playoffs)	1	21	1
Go Ahead Eagles	2013–14	Eredivisie	30	3	2	0	—		0	0	32	3
Go Ahead Eagles	2014–15	Eredivisie	26	0	1	0	—		1	0	28	0
Go Ahead Eagles	2015–16	Eerste Divisie	35	4	1	0	2 (Note: Appearances in UEFA Europa League)	0	4	0	42	4
Go Ahead Eagles	2016–17	Eredivisie	32	0	2	1	—		—		34	1
Go Ahead Eagles	2017–18	Eerste Divisie	30	3	2	0	—		—		32	3
Go Ahead Eagles	Total		153	10	8	1	2	0	5	0	168	11
Twente	2018–19	Eerste Divisie	11	1	2	1	—		—		13	2
Twente	2019–20	Eredivisie	22	0	1	0	—		—		23	0
Twente	2020–21	Eredivisie	3	0	0	0	—		—		3	0
Twente	Total		36	1	3	1	0	0	0	0	39	2
Al Batin	2020–21	Saudi Pro League	25	0	1	0	—		—		26	0
Vendsyssel	2021–22	Danish 1st Division	25	0	1	1	—		—		26	1
De Graafschap	2022–23	Eerste Divisie	20	0	4	0	—		—		24	0
De Graafschap	2023–24	Eerste Divisie	38	6	2	0	—		2	0	42	6
De Graafschap	Total		58	6	6	0	—		2	0	66	6
Septemvri Sofia	2024–25	Bulgarian First League	23	4	1	0	—		—		24	4
Persis Solo	2025–26	Super League	16	2	0	0	—		—		16	2
Career total			352	23	19	3	2	0	13	1	386	27

== Honours ==
Twente

- Eerste Divisie: 2018–19
