= Steven van der Heijden =

Dutch footballer

Personal information
- Date of birth: 26 April 1999 (age 27)
- Place of birth: Schaijk, Netherlands
- Height: 1.71 m (5 ft 7 in)
- Position: Midfielder

Team information
- Current team: De Treffers
- Number: 8

Youth career
- –2009: DAW Schaijk
- 2009–2014: Den Bosch
- 2014–2017: Brabant United
- 2017–2019: Den Bosch

Senior career*
Years	Team	Apps	(Gls)
2019–2024	Den Bosch	86	(3)
2024–	De Treffers	64	(12)
- * Club domestic league appearances and goals as of 9 October 2026

Steven van der Heijden (born 26 April 1999) is a Dutch footballer who plays as a midfielder for Tweede Divisie club De Treffers.

== Club career ==
Born in Schaijk, Van der Heijden played in the youth department of FC Den Bosch, where he has been playing in the reserve team since 2017. In early 2018, he was on the bench for a few games with the first team, but only made his debut two seasons later. This was on 12 August 2019, in the 2–2 away draw against Jong PSV. He came on for Jizz Hornkamp in the 79th minute.

On 23 April 2021, Van der Heijden scored his first professional goal in the 7–0 home thrashing of Roda JC Kerkrade. His goal was the third of the game, and came after an assist provided by Soufyan Ahannach.

In November 2024, Van der Heijden joined Tweede Divisie club De Treffers. He has his own football school.
