= Philip Brittijn =

Dutch footballer (born 2004)

Personal information
- Date of birth: 9 April 2004 (age 22)
- Place of birth: Winterswijk, Netherlands
- Height: 1.82 m (6 ft 0 in)
- Position: Midfielder

Team information
- Current team: Fortuna Sittard

Youth career
- –2014: FC Winterswijk
- 2014–2021: De Graafschap

Senior career*
| Years | Team | Apps | (Gls) |
| 2021–2025 | De Graafschap | 133 | (15) |
| 2025– | Fortuna Sittard | 32 | (4) |

International career^{‡}
| 2021 | Netherlands U18 | 1 | (0) |
| 2022 | Netherlands U19 | 2 | (0) |
- * Club domestic league appearances and goals as of 21 May 2026 ‡ National team caps and goals as of 24 September 2022

Philip Brittijn (born 9 April 2004) is a Dutch professional footballer who plays as a midfielder for Eredivisie club Fortuna Sittard.

== Career ==
=== De Graafschap ===
Brittijn was born in Winterswijk, Gelderland, and played youth football for FC Winterswijk, before joining the De Graafschap youth academy in 2014. He progressed through the ranks, and prior to the 2021–22 season, he began training with the first team. In August 2021, he signed his first professional contract with the Doetinchem-based club.

On 10 September 2021, Brittijn made his professional debut, replacing Ted van de Pavert in the 73rd minute of a 3–0 Eerste Divisie loss to Volendam. He scored his first goal two weeks later, on 24 September, against Jong Utrecht. After being subbed in for Hicham Acheffay in the second half, he equalised after receiving a long ball from goalkeeper Hidde Jurjus, securing a late 2–2 draw.

In June 2023, Brittijn's contract was renegotiated and extended until 2025. At that point, he had grown into a key player in midfield for De Graafschap.

=== Fortuna Sittard ===
On 20 June 2025, Brittijn signed a three-year contract with Eredivisie club Fortuna Sittard.

== Career statistics ==
As of match played 21 December 2025

Appearances and goals by club, season and competition
| Club | Season | League | | | KNVB Cup | | Other | | Total | |
| Club | Season | Division | Apps | Goals | Apps | Goals | Apps | Goals | Apps | Goals |
|---|---|---|---|---|---|---|---|---|---|---|
| De Graafschap | 2021–22 | Eerste Divisie | 24 | 3 | 1 | 0 | 2 (Note: Appearances in Eredivisie promotion/relegation playoffs) | 0 | 27 | 3 |
| De Graafschap | 2022–23 | Eerste Divisie | 37 | 2 | 4 | 1 | — | | 41 | 3 |
| De Graafschap | 2023–24 | Eerste Divisie | 37 | 3 | 2 | 0 | 2 | 0 | 41 | 3 |
| De Graafschap | 2024–25 | Eerste Divisie | 35 | 7 | 2 | 0 | 2 | 0 | 39 | 7 |
| De Graafschap | Total | | 133 | 15 | 9 | 1 | 6 | 0 | 148 | 16 |
| Fortuna Sittard | 2025–26 | Eredivisie | 17 | 3 | 2 | 0 | — | | 19 | 3 |
| Career total | | | 150 | 18 | 11 | 1 | 6 | 0 | 167 | 19 |
