= Alexander Büttner =

Dutch footballer (born 1989)

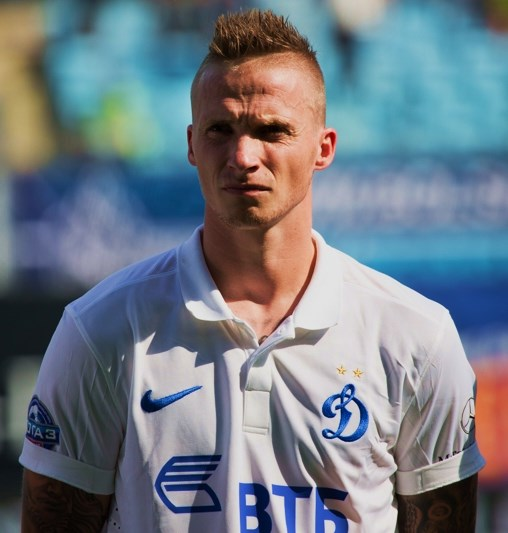
- Büttner with Dynamo Moscow in 2014.

Personal information
- Full name: Alexander Büttner
- Date of birth: 11 February 1989 (age 37)
- Place of birth: Doetinchem, Netherlands
- Height: 1.74 m (5 ft 9 in)
- Positions: Left-back; left midfielder

Team information
- Current team: Vitesse
- Number: 28

Youth career
- –2000: VV Doetinchem
- 2000–2005: Ajax
- 2005–2008: Vitesse

Senior career*
Years	Team	Apps	(Gls)
2008–2012	Vitesse	107	(10)
2012–2014	Manchester United	13	(2)
2014–2017	Dynamo Moscow	24	(0)
2016	→ Anderlecht (loan)	14	(1)
2017–2019	Vitesse	63	(2)
2017	Jong Vitesse	7	(3)
2020–2021	New England Revolution	17	(0)
2021–2022	RKC Waalwijk	26	(3)
2022–2024	De Graafschap	65	(5)
2024–	Vitesse	60	(14)

International career
2008	Netherlands U19	1	(0)
2008–2010	Netherlands U20	6	(0)
- * Club domestic league appearances and goals as of 28 April 2026

Alexander Büttner (pronounced [aːlɛkˈsɑndər ˈbʏtnər]; born 11 February 1989) is a Dutch professional footballer who plays as a left-back for Eerste Divisie club Vitesse.

== Club career ==
=== Vitesse ===
Born in Doetinchem, Büttner began his career with local club VV Doetinchem, but spent his formative years with Ajax before joining Vitesse at the age of 16 in 2005.

After progressing through the ranks at the youth system and reserves, Büttner made his professional debut for Vitesse on 15 March 2008 against Twente after coming on as a substitute for Haim Megrelashvili in the sixth minute following his poor performance. However, after coming on as a substitute for Megrelashvili, he played until he received a straight red card after a second bookable offence, in a 4–3 loss. This turned out to be his only appearance in the 2007–08 season.

In the 2008–09 season, Büttner then made his first start for the club, where he played the whole game, in a 1–1 draw against Sparta Rotterdam on 20 September 2008. Having established himself in the starting eleven, Büttner then scored his first goal for the club in a 3–1 home win over Volendam on 20 December 2008. Although he appeared on the substitute bench as the season progressed, Büttner regained his first team place and went on to score two goals in two matches between 18 April 2009 and 26 April 2009 against AZ and Utrecht. At the end of the season, Büttner went on to make twenty-three appearances and scoring three times in all competitions.

In the 2009–10 season, Büttner signed his contract and continued to be involved in the first team, competing with Jeroen Drost and Gino Felixdaal over the left-back position, although he spent time the first half of the season, coming on as a substitute. Büttner soon managed his left-back position in the first team and went on to score two goals later in the season against Groningen and Roda JC. At the end of the 2009–10 season, Büttner made twenty-nine appearances and scored two times in all competitions.

In the 2010–11 season, Büttner fully established himself as a left back in the first team. His performance soon attracted interests clubs around Europe from Polish clubs Legia Warsaw and Lech Poznań, but the transfer move never happened and because of this, he appeared on the substitute bench since the end of January, as well as, his own injury concerns. He managed to regain his first team place after the failed transfer move and went on to make twenty-five appearances in all competitions. With his contract expiring at the end of the season, the club opened negotiations with Büttner over a new contract. Eventually, Büttner signed a contract extension, keeping him until 2011.

In the 2011–12 season, Büttner started the season well when he set up two goals, in a 2–1 win over Utrecht on 20 August 2011, followed up by scoring his first goal of the season, in a 4–1 loss against Ajax. Three weeks later, on 17 September 2011, Büttner scored his second goal of the season, in a 5–0 win over Roda JC. Throughout the season, he continued to be in a regular first team, playing either left-back and left-midfielder. Because of this, his performance further attracted interests from clubs, such as, Arizona and Twente. It wasn't until on 12 April 2012 when he scored his third goal of the season, in a 3–1 win over VVV-Venlo. On 28 April 2012, Büttner scored a brace, in a 3–2 win over Excelsior. Although he suffered a toe injury in the next game, Büttner returned to the next game from injury in the last game of the season, in a 3–1 loss against Ajax. At the end of the season, Büttner went on to make thirty-nine appearances and scoring five times in all competitions. For his performance, Büttner was voted by the fans as Vitesse player of the year.

On 6 July 2012, Vitesse agreed a fee with Southampton over the transfer of Büttner to the English club, subject to a medical. The proposed move to Southampton was subsequently halted "due to an unspecified 'demand' from an unnamed third party"; this was believed to be a claim for a percentage of the transfer fee.

=== Manchester United ===
On 21 August 2012, Büttner signed a five-year contract with Manchester United, where he was given the number 28 shirt.

Büttner made his league debut on 15 September, setting up the second goal and scoring the third, in a 4–0 home win against Wigan Athletic. His performance gained him the man of the match award. On 23 October, he made his UEFA club competition debut in a 3–2 home victory over Braga in the group stage of the 2012–13 UEFA Champions League. On 5 January, Büttner made his FA Cup debut in a 2–2 draw against West Ham United. United went on to win the Premier League and Büttner received a winner's medal by a special dispensation given by the manager. He scored his second goal for Manchester United on the final day of the season in a dramatic 5–5 draw against West Bromwich Albion. After collecting a pass from Tom Cleverley in the inside left channel, he drove into the penalty area and fired a low shot into the far corner. Büttner said he credited his girlfriend and brother with helping him overcome homesickness.

In the 2013–14 season, Büttner struggled to regain his first-team place in his second season at the club, as France international Patrice Evra was preferred at left-back under the management of David Moyes. In the summer transfer window, he was expected to leave the club on loan to Beşiktaş, but Moyes blocked the move from happening. Büttner then made his first appearance of the season on 25 September 2013, playing at left-back in a 1–0 win over Liverpool in the second round of League Cup. It wasn't until late-March when Büttner had a handful of first team appearances following Evra's injury. Büttner's performance even earned praises from Evra. By the end of the 2013–14 season, Büttner had made 15 appearances for the club in all competitions.

=== Dynamo Moscow ===
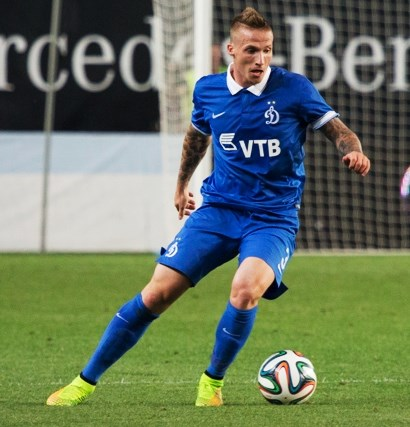
Büttner playing for Dynamo Moscow in a UEFA Europa League match against Omonia, in which he scored.

On 24 June 2014, citing a lack of playing time and a personal rift between himself and United coach Louis van Gaal, Büttner announced that he was leaving Manchester United for Dynamo Moscow, on a three-year deal for £4.4 million potentially rising to £5.6 million.

Büttner made his Dynamo Moscow debut, where he made his first start for the club, in a 1–1 draw against Hapoel Ironi Kiryat Shmona in the first leg of the third round of the UEFA Europa League and went through to next round after winning 2–1 on aggregate in the second leg. Days later, he made his league debut for the club, in the opening game of the season, in a 7–3 win over Rostov. Weeks later on 21 August 2014, he scored his first goal for Dynamo Moscow in a 2–2 draw against Cypriot club Omonia in the Europa League. Büttner, however, was sent-off in the UEFA Europa League match against Anderlecht after receiving a second bookable offence, in a 0–0 draw. Later in the season, he received a red card again for a second time this season on 24 May 2015, in a 2–2 draw against Arsenal Tula. In his first season at the club, Büttner made thirty-one (19 in the league) and scoring once in all competitions.

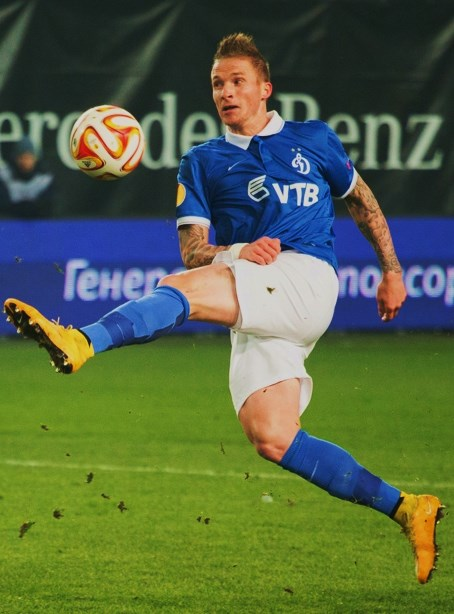
Büttner taking a kick in the UEFA Europa League match against Estoril.

In his second season at Dynamo Moscow, however, Büttner suffered an injury at the start of the season. He then made his return to the first team from injury, in a 1–1 draw against Lokomotiv Moscow. However, this turns out to be his only appearance, as he suffered injuries by the first half of the season.

Following his loan spell at Anderlecht came to an end, Büttner expressed desire to leave the club in the summer transfer window, with clubs around Europe keen on signing him, but stayed at the club throughout the summer. Despite this, he returned to the first team and was given a number twenty-four shirt. Büttner made his first appearance for the club in a year on 12 October 2016, where he played the whole game, in a 0–0 draw against Khimki. In December 2016, with four appearances this season, Büttner was released by the club, in the wake of the club's financial difficulties. After leaving the club, Büttner reflected his time at the club, stating that he enjoyed his first season at the club, but became disillusioned in his latter career there, citing the departure of the club's president, Boris Romanovich Rotenberg, and players subsequently left the club as a result.

==== Loan to Anderlecht ====
On 1 February 2016, he agreed to join Belgian side Anderlecht on loan until the end of 2015/16 season. It came after when his agent hinted his departure from Dynamo Moscow in the January transfer window.

On 5 February 2016, Büttner made his Anderlecht debut in a 2–2 draw with KV Mechelen, featuring for the entire 90 minutes. A week later, Büttner went onto score his first goal for Anderlecht, netting the second in the Belgian side's 3–0 victory over Zulte Waregem. In a match against Kortrijk on 13 March 2016, Büttner set up two goals, in a 3–0 win. Later in the 2015–16 season, Büttner became a first team regular at the club, but was unsuccessful to win the league, as they finished second place. At the end of the 2015–16 season, making 16 appearances and scoring once in all competitions, Büttner returned to his parent club after Anderlecht decided against signing him on a permanent basis.

=== Return to Vitesse ===
On 16 January 2017, Büttner returned to Vitesse, signing a 2.5-year contract with the club. Upon re-joining the club, he was a replacement for Kosuke Ota, who returned to FC Tokyo.

Büttner made his second Vitesse debut on 19 February 2017, where he came on as a second-half substitute, in a 1–0 loss against Ajax.

He left Vitesse in July 2019 upon the expiration of his contract.

=== New England Revolution ===
On 1 November 2019, Büttner joined Major League Soccer side New England Revolution for the 2020 season. On 20 January 2021, New England and Büttner mutually agreed to terminate his contract.

=== RKC Waalwijk ===
In July 2021, Büttner joined Eredivisie side RKC Waalwijk for the 2021–22 season.

=== De Graafschap ===
On 28 April 2022, De Graafschap signed Büttner to a three-year deal.

=== Second return to Vitesse ===
On 7 August 2024, Büttner returned to Vitesse once more, with a two-year contract.

== International career ==
Büttner has represented the Netherlands at under-20 and under-21 levels.

On 7 May 2012, Büttner was named in the provisional list of 36 players for the UEFA Euro 2012 tournament, one of nine uncapped players to be chosen by Netherlands manager Bert van Marwijk as part of the preliminary squad. However, Büttner was among seven players to be cut from the squad after van Marwijk reduced his squad to 27 players on 15 May 2012. Two years after being cut from the squad, Büttner expressed hope he would be called up by the national team one day, but this never happened.

== Personal life ==
Born in Doetinchem, Netherlands, Büttner grew up in a football-loving family. Like Büttner himself, his two brothers and father are also footballers. Growing up, Büttner revealed that his father was very strict on him. He is the cousin of fellow footballer Giovanni Büttner.

== Career statistics ==
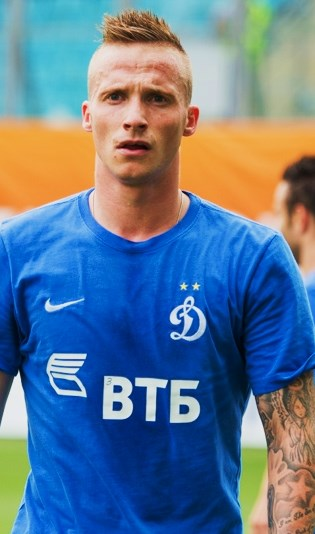
Büttner playing for Dynamo Moscow in a league match against rivals Spartak Moscow.

As of match played 28 August 2023

Appearances by club, season and competition
Club	Season	League			Cup		League Cup		Europe		Other (Note: Includes other competitive competitions, including the Eredivisie European competition Playoffs, FA Community Shield and Johan Cruyff Shield.)		Total	
Club	Season	Division	Apps	Goals	Apps	Goals	Apps	Goals	Apps	Goals	Apps	Goals	Apps	Goals
Vitesse	2007–08	Eredivisie	1	0	0	0	—		—		—		1	0
Vitesse	2008–09	Eredivisie	23	3	2	0	—		—		—		25	3
Vitesse	2009–10	Eredivisie	27	2	2	0	—		—		—		29	2
Vitesse	2010–11	Eredivisie	24	0	1	0	—		—		—		25	0
Vitesse	2011–12	Eredivisie	32	5	4	0	—		—		3	0	39	5
Vitesse	Total		107	10	9	0	—		—		3	0	119	10
Manchester United	2012–13	Premier League	5	2	3	0	2	0	3	0	—		13	2
Manchester United	2013–14	Premier League	8	0	1	0	3	0	3	0	0	0	15	0
Manchester United	Total		13	2	4	0	5	0	6	0	0	0	28	2
Dynamo Moscow	2014–15	Russian Premier League	19	0	0	0	—		12	1	—		31	1
Dynamo Moscow	2015–16	Russian Premier League	1	0	0	0	—		—		—		1	0
Dynamo Moscow	2016–17	Russian First League	4	0	1	0	—		—		—		5	0
Dynamo Moscow	Total		24	0	1	0	—		12	1	—		37	1
Anderlecht (loan)	2015–16	Belgian First Division	14	1	0	0	—		2	0	—		16	1
Vitesse	2016–17	Eredivisie	10	0	1	0	—		—		0	0	11	0
Vitesse	2017–18	Eredivisie	17	0	1	0	—		4	0	5	1	27	1
Vitesse	2018–19	Eredivisie	13	1	1	0	—		4	0	—		18	1
Vitesse	Total		40	1	3	0	—		8	0	5	1	56	2
New England	2020	MLS	18	0	0	0	—		—		—		18	0
Waalwijk	2021–22	Eredivisie	26	3	1	0	—		—		—		27	3
De Graafschap	2022–23	Eerste Divisie	35	4	2	0	—		—		—		37	4
De Graafschap	2023–24	Eerste Divisie	2	0	0	0	—		—		—		2	0
De Graafschap	Total		37	4	2	0	—		—		—		39	4
Career total			198	21	21	0	5	0	28	1	8	1	341	23

== Honours ==
Manchester United

- Premier League: 2012–13

Vitesse

- KNVB Cup: 2016–17

Individual

- Eerste Divisie Team of the Year: 2022–23
