= Dave de Meij =

Dutch footballer

Personal information
- Date of birth: 3 July 2001 (age 25)
- Place of birth: Helmond, Netherlands
- Height: 1.85 m (6 ft 1 in)
- Position: Forward

Team information
- Current team: Blauw Geel '38
- Number: 16

Youth career
- 2006–2009: VV Bruheze
- 2009–2012: Eindhoven
- 2012–2016: Helmond Sport
- 2016–2017: Gemert
- 2017–2019: Eindhoven

Senior career*
Years	Team	Apps	(Gls)
2019–2022	Eindhoven	31	(2)
2022–	Blauw Geel '38	87	(30)
- * Club domestic league appearances and goals as of 4 August 2025

Dave de Meij (born 3 July 2001) is a Dutch footballer who plays as a forward for Blauw Geel '38.

== Career ==
Born in Helmond, De Meij played youth football for VV Bruheze, FC Eindhoven, Helmond Sport and VV Gemert, before returning to the Eindhoven academy. He made his professional debut for the club on 13 December 2019 as a second-half substitute in a 2–2 draw in the Eerste Divisie against Jong FC Utrecht.

On 12 June 2022, de Meij signed with fourth-tier Derde Divisie club Blauw Geel '38.

== Career statistics ==
As of 10 January 2022

Appearances and goals by club, season and competition
Club	Season	League			KNVB Cup		Other		Total	
Club	Season	Division	Apps	Goals	Apps	Goals	Apps	Goals	Apps	Goals
FC Eindhoven	2019–20	Eerste Divisie	6	0	2	0	0	0	8	0
FC Eindhoven	2020–21	Eerste Divisie	4	1	0	0	0	0	4	1
FC Eindhoven	2021–22	Eerste Divisie	13	1	0	0	0	0	13	1
Career total			23	2	2	0	0	0	25	2
