= Giovanni Büttner =

Dutch footballer (born 1998)

Personal information
- Date of birth: 22 September 1998 (age 28)
- Place of birth: Doetinchem, Netherlands
- Height: 1.78 m (5 ft 10 in)
- Positions: Attacking midfielder; left winger

Team information
- Current team: MASV

Youth career
- –2010: DZC '68
- 2010–2014: Vitesse
- 2014–2018: Go Ahead Eagles

Senior career*
Years	Team	Apps	(Gls)
2018–2019	Go Ahead Eagles	1	(0)
2019–2022	TOP Oss	43	(3)
2023	Kozakken Boys	10	(5)
2023–2024	De Graafschap	25	(0)
2024	Vitesse	3	(1)
2025–	MASV		
- * Club domestic league appearances and goals as of 26 November 2024

Giovanni Büttner (born 22 September 1998) is a Dutch professional footballer who plays as an attacking midfielder or left winger for Vierde Divisie club MASV. He is the cousin of fellow footballer Alexander Büttner.

== Career ==
Born in Doetinchem, Büttner played for DZC '68 and Vitesse at youth level before joining the academy of Go Ahead Eagles in 2015. Büttner made his debut for Go Ahead Eagles on 31 October 2018, coming on as a substitute in a 3–0 defeat at Ajax in the KNVB Cup, before making his league debut in the Eerste Divisie against TOP Oss on 22 April 2019.

In the summer of 2019, Büttner joined fellow Eerste Divisie club TOP Oss. He established himself as a regular player at the club, securing a contract extension until 2021 in December 2019. Despite encountering injuries during his second season, he was granted a contract extension for an additional year.

Upon the expiration of his contract in 2022, Büttner underwent a trial period with Telstar in an attempt to secure a new deal, but this endeavor proved unsuccessful. Consequently, he joined Kozakken Boys, starting off strongly with a hat-trick in his debut, but his stint there was short-lived due to an injury. Given the distance between his hometown Doetinchem and Werkendam, both the club and the player mutually agreed to part ways in November 2022. In May 2023, he underwent training sessions with his hometown club, De Graafschap, and later on, on 8 September 2023, he officially joined the first team on amateur terms, coincidentally joining his cousin Alexander at the club.

On 2 September 2024, he joined Vitesse on amateur basis, joining Alexander once again. On 27 November 2024, he left Vitesse due to "difference of opinion".
