= Mouad Hassan =

Djiboutian footballer (born 1999)

Personal information
- Full name: Mouad Amir Mohamed Hassan
- Date of birth: 21 December 1999 (age 26)
- Place of birth: 's-Hertogenbosch, Netherlands
- Height: 1.82 m (6 ft 0 in)
- Position: Winger

Team information
- Current team: Kozakken Boys
- Number: 7

Youth career
- SV CHC

Senior career*
Years	Team	Apps	(Gls)
2019–2022	SV CHC		
2022–2024	OJC Rosmalen	65	(15)
2024–2025	UNA	31	(4)
2025–	Kozakken Boys	34	(3)

International career^{‡}
2025–	Djibouti	9	(0)
- * Club domestic league appearances and goals as of 2 October 2026 ‡ National team caps and goals as of 2 October 2026

Mouad Amir Mohamed Hassan (born 21 December 1999) is a professional footballer who plays as a winger for the Tweede Divisie club Kozakken Boys. Born in the Netherlands, he plays for the Djibouti national team.

== Club career ==
Hassan began his senior playing career with the amateur side SV CHC in the Tweede Klasse. In 2022, he moved to OJC Rosmalen in the Derde Divisie where he played for 2 seasons. On 29 January 2024, it was announced he would transfer to VV UNA in the same division for the 2924–2025 season. On 3 January 2025, he transferred to Kozakken Boys for the 2025–26 season.

== International career ==
Born in the Netherlands, Hassan is of Djiboutian descent. He was called up to the Djibouti national team for a set of 2026 FIFA World Cup qualification matches in March 2025.

== Personal life ==
Outside of football, Hassan studied human resource management at the Avans University of Applied Sciences.
