= Gino Felixdaal =

Dutch footballer (born 1990)

Personal information
- Full name: Gino Leandro Felixdaal
- Date of birth: 5 January 1990 (age 36)
- Place of birth: Amsterdam, Netherlands
- Height: 1.86 m (6 ft 1 in)
- Position: Centre-back

Youth career
- FC Sloten
- SDW
- Amstelveen Heemraad
- Vitesse

Senior career*
Years	Team	Apps	(Gls)
2009–2011	Vitesse	9	(0)
2011–2013	Almere City	36	(1)
2013–2014	FC Chabab		
2014–2015	ADO '20		
2015–2016	JOS Watergraafsmeer		
- * Club domestic league appearances and goals

Gino Felixdaal (born 5 January 1990) is a Dutch former professional footballer who played as a centre-back.

== Club career ==
He made his professional debut for Vitesse in a 14 April 2010 Eredivisie match against NAC. He joined Eerste Divisie side Almere City in 2011 but moved into amateur football two years later with Topklasse club FC Chabab. He later played for ADO '20 and JOS Watergraafsmeer .
