= Petar Stošković =

Dutch footballer

Personal information
- Date of birth: 25 July 1993 (age 33)
- Place of birth: Dordrecht, Netherlands
- Height: 1.96 m (6 ft 5 in)
- Position: Goalkeeper

Team information
- Current team: SteDoCo
- Number: 1

Youth career
- –2011: VV Woudrichem
- 2011–2012: FC Den Bosch

Senior career*
Years	Team	Apps	(Gls)
2009–2011	VV Woudrichem		
2012–2014	FC Den Bosch	0	(0)
2014–2018	UNA	119	(0)
2018–2020	FC Dordrecht	16	(0)
2020–2021	OFC Oostzaan	4	(0)
2021–	SteDoCo	2	(0)
- * Club domestic league appearances and goals as of 18 September 2021

Petar Stošković (born 25 July 1993) is a Dutch football player of Serbian descent. He plays for SteDoCo.

== Club career ==
He made his Eerste Divisie debut for Dordrecht on 13 January 2019 in a game against his former club Den Bosch and allowed 6 goals in the game.
