= Rowan Besselink =

Dutch footballer (born 2004)

Personal information
- Date of birth: 11 October 2004 (age 22)
- Place of birth: Rijswijk, Netherlands
- Height: 1.83 m (6 ft 0 in)
- Position: Centre-back

Team information
- Current team: De Graafschap
- Number: 3

Youth career
- 2020–2022: NAC Breda

Senior career*
Years	Team	Apps	(Gls)
2022–2024	NAC Breda	33	(0)
2024–	De Graafschap	53	(1)
- * Club domestic league appearances and goals as of 28 April 2026

Rowan Besselink (born 11 October 2004) is a Dutch professional footballer who plays as a centre-back for Eerste Divisie club De Graafschap.

== Career ==
Born in Rijswijk, Besselink began his career with NAC Breda, where he made his senior debut in August 2022, the same month he was linked with a transfer to Italy. He signed his first professional contract in October 2022.

In January 2023, following a Cup win, he was described as a "hero". In October 2023, following an injury to Cuco Martina, Besselink began to play regularly for the first-team. In March 2024 he spoke of "becoming a man" following his first-team experiences.

On 27 August 2024, Besselink signed a multi-year contract with De Graafschap.
