= Jan Lammers (footballer) =

Dutch footballer (born 1995)

Personal information
- Full name: Jan Lammers
- Date of birth: 10 May 1995 (age 31)
- Place of birth: Zevenaar, Netherlands
- Height: 1.91 m (6 ft 3 in)
- Position: Centre-back

Youth career
- 1999–2003: SV DCS
- 2003–2014: De Graafschap

Senior career*
Years	Team	Apps	(Gls)
2014–2017	De Graafschap	41	(2)
2017–2019	RKC Waalwijk	34	(2)
2019	Borneo	8	(0)
2020–2022	TOP Oss	61	(1)
2022–2024	De Graafschap	27	(1)
- * Club domestic league appearances and goals as of 14:45, 9 June 2024 (UTC)

Jan Lammers (born 10 May 1995) is a Dutch professional footballer who plays as a centre-back. He formerly played for RKC Waalwijk, Borneo, TOP Oss, and De Graafschap.

== Career ==
Lammers is a youth exponent from De Graafschap. He made his professional debut on 13 September 2014 in an Eerste Divisie game against SC Telstar. He replaced Robin Pröpper after 63 minutes in a 3–2 home win.

After having spent some months playing in Indonesia for Borneo, Lammers returned to the Netherlands, where he signed for Eerste Divisie club TOP Oss on 12 March 2020.

In June 2022, Lammers returned to De Graafschap on a free transfer, signing a two-year contract. After playing regularly for the club, he suffered a back injury which sidelined him the first half of 2024. In June 2024, it was announced that his expiring contract would not be extended, making him a free agent.

== Career statistics ==
As of match played 8 December 2023

Appearances and goals by club, season and competition
Club	Season	League			Cup		Other		Total	
Club	Season	Division	Apps	Goals	Apps	Goals	Apps	Goals	Apps	Goals
De Graafschap	2014–15	Eerste Divisie	8	0	2	1	—		10	1
De Graafschap	2015–16	Eredivisie	5	0	1	0	—		6	0
De Graafschap	2016–17	Eerste Divisie	28	2	1	0	—		29	2
De Graafschap	Total		41	2	4	1	0	0	45	3
RKC Waalwijk	2017–18	Eerste Divisie	23	1	3	0	—		26	1
RKC Waalwijk	2018–19	Eerste Divisie	11	1	2	0	—		13	1
RKC Waalwijk	Total		34	2	5	0	0	0	39	2
Borneo	2019	Liga 1	4	0	6	0	3 (Note: Appearances in the Indonesia President's Cup)	0	13	0
TOP Oss	2019–20	Eerste Divisie	2	0	0	0	—		2	0
TOP Oss	2020–21	Eerste Divisie	35	1	1	0	—		36	1
TOP Oss	2021–22	Eerste Divisie	24	0	1	0	—		25	0
TOP Oss	Total		61	1	2	0	0	0	63	1
De Graafschap	2022–23	Eerste Divisie	17	0	0	0	—		17	0
De Graafschap	2023–24	Eerste Divisie	10	1	0	0	0	0	10	1
De Graafschap	Total		27	1	0	0	0	0	27	1
Career total			167	6	17	1	3	0	187	7
