= Gavin Vlijter =

Surinamese footballer (born 1997)

Personal information
- Date of birth: 12 February 1997 (age 29)
- Place of birth: Paramaribo, Suriname
- Height: 1.77 m (5 ft 10 in)
- Position: Winger

Team information
- Current team: De Treffers
- Number: 11

Youth career
- –2006: Transvaal
- 2006–2014: Venlosche Boys
- 2014–2015: Fortuna Sittard

Senior career*
Years	Team	Apps	(Gls)
2015–2019	Fortuna Sittard	39	(3)
2019–2020	MVV	13	(0)
2020–	De Treffers	137	(20)
- * Club domestic league appearances and goals as of 16:01, 4 March 2026 (UTC)

Gavin Vlijter (born 12 February 1997) is a Surinamese football player who plays as a winger for Tweede Divisie club De Treffers, and the Suriname national football team.

== Club career ==
He made his professional debut in the Eerste Divisie for Fortuna Sittard on 13 March 2015 in a game against Sparta Rotterdam.

On 4 June 2020, he moved to De Treffers.
