= Başar Önal =

Dutch born Turkish footballer (born 2004)

Personal information
- Date of birth: 6 July 2004 (age 22)
- Place of birth: Doetinchem, Netherlands
- Height: 1.73 m (5 ft 8 in)
- Positions: Left winger; left midfielder

Team information
- Current team: Lille
- Number: 19

Youth career
- 2009–2012: DZC '68
- 2012–2022: De Graafschap

Senior career*
Years	Team	Apps	(Gls)
2022–2024	De Graafschap	73	(17)
2024–2026	NEC	62	(8)
2026–	Lille	4	(0)

International career^{‡}
2021–2022	Turkey U18	6	(2)
2022	Turkey U19	3	(1)
2024–	Turkey U21	8	(1)
- * Club domestic league appearances and goals as of 20 September 2026 ‡ National team caps and goals as of 31 March 2026

Başar Önal (born 6 July 2004) is a professional footballer who plays as a left winger or left midfielder for Ligue 1 club Lille. Born in the Netherlands, he is a youth international for Turkey.

== Professional career ==
Önal began playing football with the youth sides of DZC '68 at the age of 5, before being scouted by De Graafschap at eight-years old.

He worked his way up their youth categories, eventually promoting straight to their senior team in 2022. He made his senior and professional debut with De Graafschap as a late substitute in a 3–1 Eerste Divisie loss to MVV on 18 March 2022. On 15 April 2022, he signed his first professional contract with De Graafschap for 3 seasons.

On 5 July 2024, Eredivisie club NEC announced that Önal had signed a four-year contract with the club.

On 8 July 2026, Önal moved to Lille in France on a four-season deal.

== International career ==
Önal is a youth international for Turkey, having played up to the Turkey U19s.

== Personal life ==
Önal was born in the Netherlands to Turkish parents.

== Playing style ==
Önal began playing football as a left-back, before moving to left winger as a U17. He is a fast attacker who is good at handling the ball and getting past opponents. He likes having the ball at his feet, and attacking from the flanks or as a false striker.

== Career statistics ==
As of match played 21 October 2026

Appearances and goals by club, season and competition
Club	Season	League			National cup		Europe		Other		Total	
Club	Season	Division	Apps	Goals	Apps	Goals	Apps	Goals	Apps	Goals	Apps	Goals
De Graafschap	2021–22	Eerste Divisie	4	1	0	0	—		2 (Note: Appearances in Eredivisie promotion/relegation playoffs)	0	6	1
De Graafschap	2022–23	Eerste Divisie	37	7	4	2	—		—		41	9
De Graafschap	2023–24	Eerste Divisie	32	9	2	0	—		2	0	36	9
De Graafschap	Total		73	17	6	2	—		4	0	83	19
NEC	2024–25	Eredivisie	33	1	2	0	—		1 (Note: Appearance in European play-offs)	0	36	1
NEC	2025–26	Eredivisie	29	7	5	2	—		—		34	9
NEC	Total		62	8	7	2	0	0	1	0	70	10
Lille	2026–27	Ligue 1	4	0	0	0	2 (Note: Appearances in UEFA Champions League)	0	—		6	0
Career total			139	25	13	4	2	0	5	0	159	29
