= Robin Schouten =

Dutch footballer

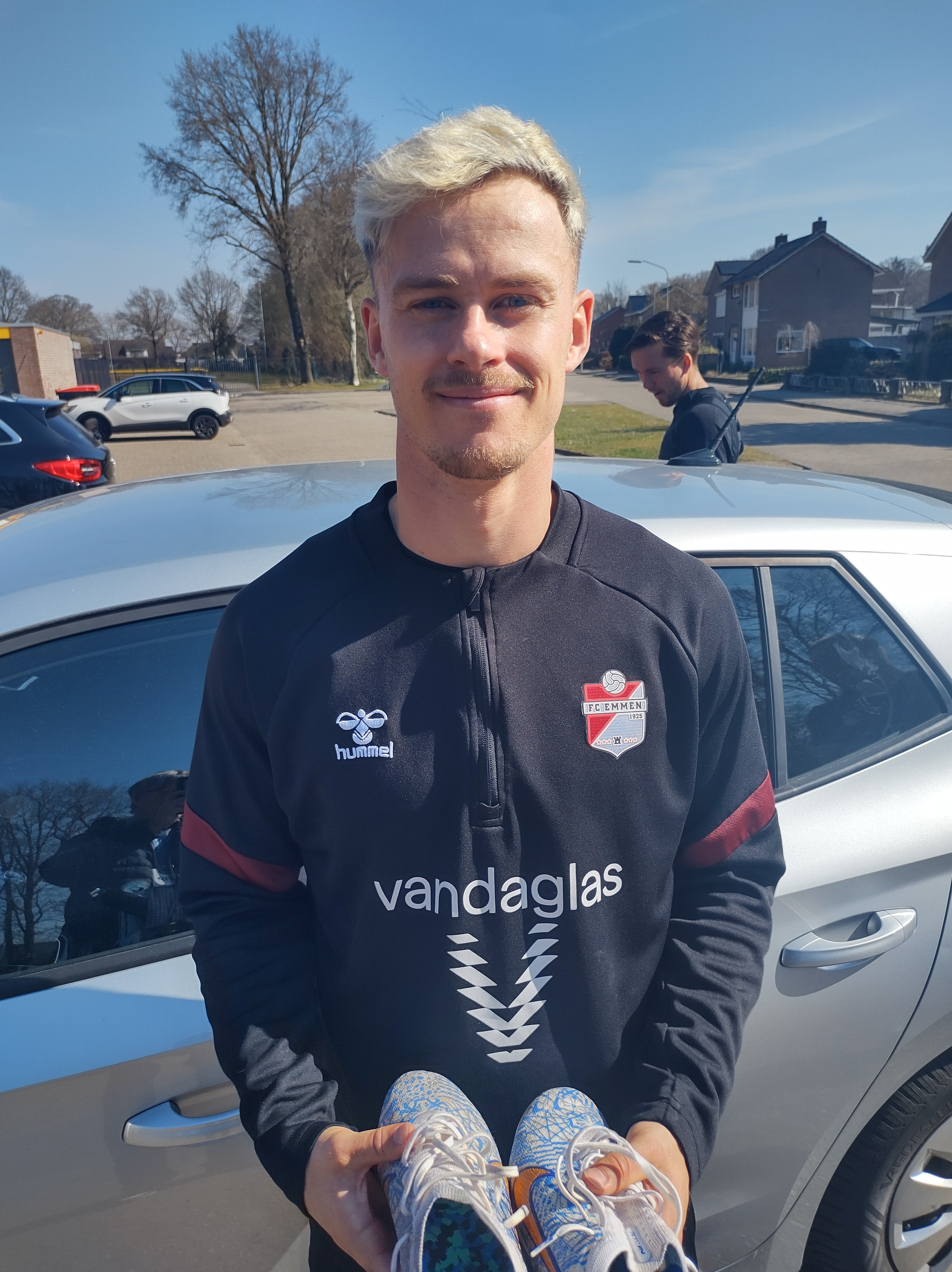

Personal information
- Date of birth: 25 February 1998 (age 28)
- Place of birth: Alkmaar, Netherlands
- Height: 1.78 m (5 ft 10 in)
- Position: Right-back

Youth career
- –2009: SV De Foresters
- 2009–2016: AZ Alkmaar

Senior career*
Years	Team	Apps	(Gls)
2016–2017	Jong AZ	21	(3)
2017–2019	Jong Ajax	3	(0)
2018–2019	→ FC Volendam (loan)	33	(2)
2019–2021	NAC Breda	48	(3)
2021–2023	SønderjyskE	5	(0)
2022–2023	→ De Graafschap (loan)	27	(0)
2023–2025	Emmen	39	(0)
2025–2026	Septemvri Sofia	26	(0)
- * Club domestic league appearances and goals as of 16 October 2026

Robin Schouten (born 25 February 1998) is a Dutch professional footballer who plays as a right-back.

== Club career ==
He made his Eerste Divisie debut for Jong Ajax on 18 August 2017 in a game against SC Cambuur.

He moved to NAC Breda in July 2019. After two years, Schouten moved to Denmark and joined Danish Superliga club SønderjyskE on 25 August 2021, signing a deal until June 2024. On 20 June 2022, Schouten returned to his homeland, as he signed a one-year loan deal with De Graafschap. On 10 August 2023, after returning from loan, SønderjyskE confirmed that the parties had mutually agreed to terminate Schouten's contract.

On 12 August 2023, Schouten signed a two-year contract with Emmen. In July 2025, he relocated to Bulgaria, signing a contract with First League club Septemvri Sofia.
