= De Treffers =

Dutch football club

- Full name: De Treffers
- Founded: 1 August 1919; 106 years ago
- Ground: Sportpark Zuid, Groesbeek
- Capacity: 4,700
- Chairman: Theo Jochoms
- Manager: Theo Janssen
- League: Tweede Divisie
- 2025–26: Tweede Divisie, 3rd of 18
Home colours	Away colours

De Treffers is an amateur football club from Groesbeek, Netherlands. The club plays in the Tweede Divisie, the highest amateur league of Dutch football.

== History ==
It was founded in 1919, and its first chairman was Jan Piepenbreier. De Treffers has been a member of the Royal Dutch Football Association since around 1930. In the seasons 1935–1936 and 1936–1937 it was champion of the eastern district of the Eerste Klasse (First amateur league), at the time the highest league in Dutch amateur football. In both seasons De Treffers failed to win the national amateur championship.

After the Second World War De Treffers performed less well. In the 1961–1962 season De Treffers was promoted from Derde Klasse (Third amateur league) to Tweede Klasse (Second amateur league). From 1963 to 1974, with the exception of the 1971–1972 season, De Treffers played in the Eerste Klasse (First amateur league).

From 1974 to 2010, De Treffers participated in the Sunday Hoofdklasse. De Treffers were the only team to play so constantly in the Hoofdklasse during these years. The football club has won the district championship of the Hoofdklasse six times (in 1986, 1988, 1990, 1991, 1998, and 2005). In 1988, 1991, and 1998 De Treffers also won the Sunday amateur championships, and in 1991 and 1998 De Treffers became champion of Dutch amateur football in general.

In 2010 it was promoted to the newly formed Topklasse, the highest amateur league. De Treffers has since qualified for the Tweede Divisie which, since 2016, has succeeded Topklasse as the highest amateur division in the Netherlands.

== Current squad ==
As of 4 March 2026

Note: Flags indicate national team as defined under FIFA eligibility rules; some limited exceptions apply. Players may hold more than one non-FIFA nationality.

No.	Pos.	Nation	Player
1	GK	NED	Petar Stošković
2	DF	UKR	Artem Mashtaliruk
3	DF	NED	Tjeu Langeveld
4	DF	NED	Guus Joppen
5	DF	NED	Bryan Sirvania
6	MF	NED	Ricardo Ippel (captain)
8	MF	NED	Steven van der Heijden
10	MF	NED	Willem den Dekker
11	FW	NED	Gavin Vlijter
12	DF	NED	Jorn van Hedel
14	MF	NED	Nouri El Harmazi
15	DF	NED	Joey van Beukering

No.	Pos.	Nation	Player
16	MF	NED	Redouan Hazzat
17	FW	NED	Sebastiaan van Bakel
18	MF	NED	Ruben van Strien
19	FW	NED	Tim Waterink
21	DF	NED	Jari van Ginkel
24	FW	NED	Bas Brussaard
28	GK	NED	Wessel Sprangers
—	DF	NED	Migiel Zeller
—	MF	NED	Gijs Steinfelder
—	MF	NED	Anis Yadir
—	FW	NED	Coen Maertzdorf

== Wyke Wanderers Exchange ==
Each year the junior teams of De Treffers and Wyke Wanderers (an English amateur football club) take part in an event where the two teams meet each other and get to know one another. These take part in a series of activities followed by a football match this normally takes place for 4–5 days. One year the event will take place at De Treffers the following year it will take place at Wyke Wanderers.
