= De Vijverberg =

Stadium in Doetinchem, Netherlands

Stadion De Vijverberg
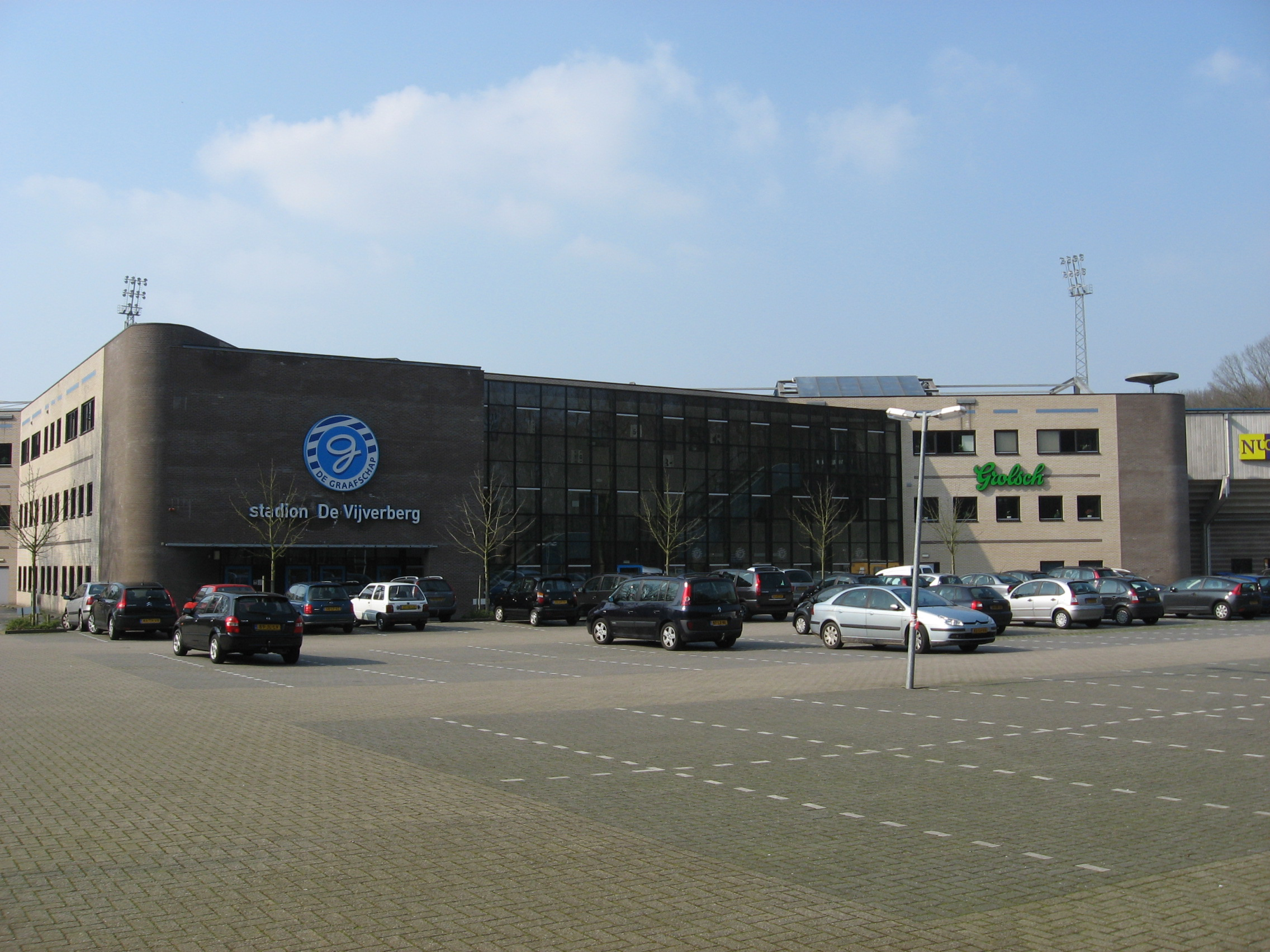
- Interactive map of Stadion De Vijverberg
- Location: Doetinchem, Netherlands
- Coordinates: 51°57′21″N 6°18′35″E
- Owner: Doetinchem Municipality
- Capacity: 12,600
- Surface: grass
- Field size: 105 × 68 m

Construction
- Opened: 4 September 1954
- Renovated: 1970, 1998
- Expanded: 1970
- Architect: Simonetti Architecten (1998)

Tenant
- De Graafschap (1954–present)

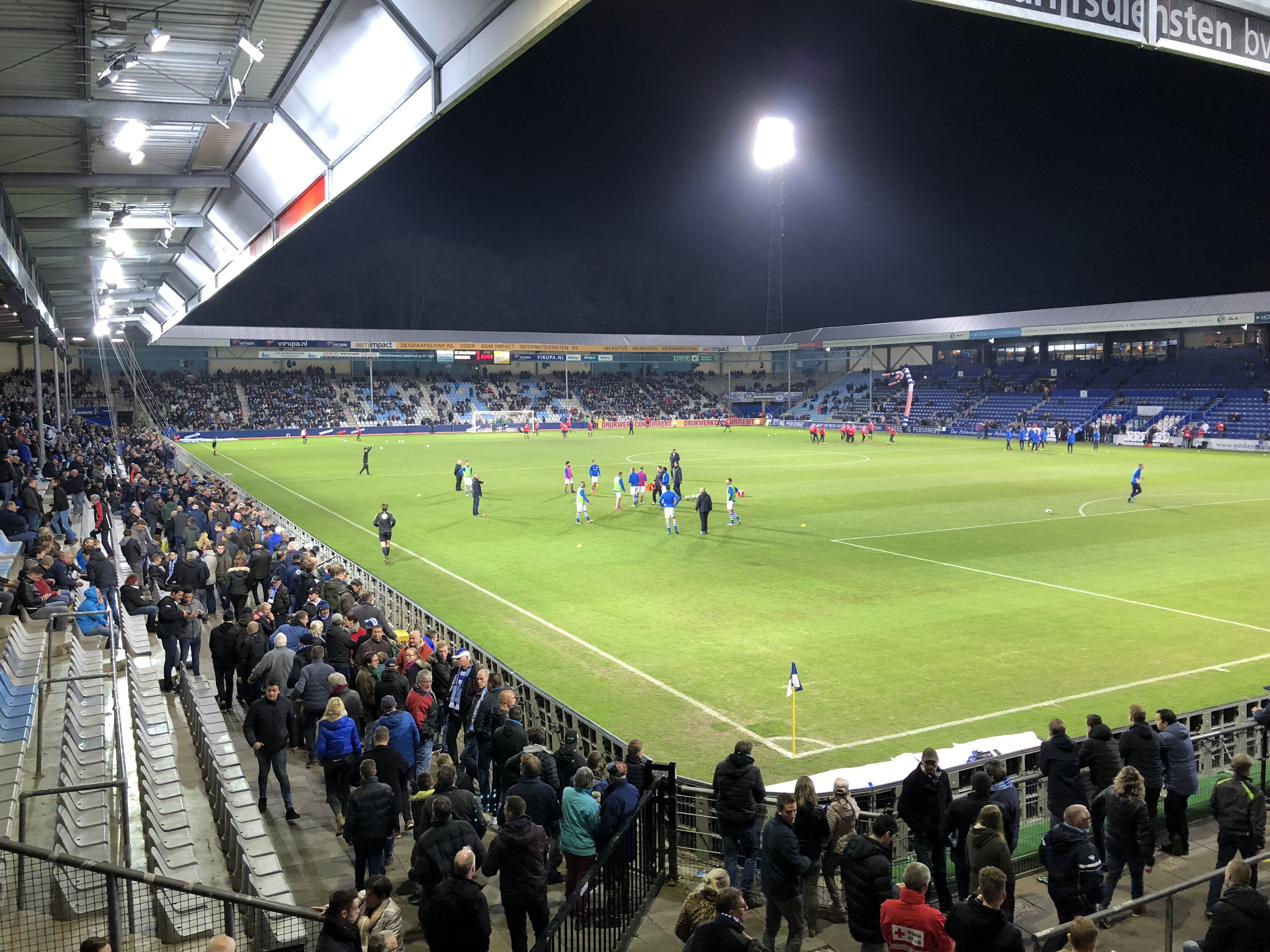
The interior of the stadium.

Stadion De Vijverberg (Dutch pronunciation: [də ˈvɛivərbɛr(ə)x]; English: The Pond Hill) is the football stadium in Doetinchem, Netherlands. It has a capacity of 12,600 seats.

The name is derived from a hotel with the same name, which stood on the present location of the stadium. Because of all the ponds that had to be filled up, the name Vijverberg arose. The stadium, which was built in 1954, was renovated in 1970, with the construction of the Vijverberg-, Groenendaal- and Spinnekop stands and the light installation. After the construction of the roofs above the stands in the late eighties, a radical renovation of the Vijverberg began in the summer of 1998. With the installation of seats on the Spinnekop stand, named after the famous Spion Kop, one of the characteristic parts went lost, so in 2008 De Graafschap decided to remove the seats again. The stadium used to have its own train station, but it was closed in 2005. Like many clubs in the Netherlands, the board of De Graafschap in 2012 considered switching to artificial turf in the stadium. A large supporter's group fiercely protested against these plans, saying the Superboeren are supposed to play in the "mud" as they have always done.

The venue opened on 4 September 1954.

== See also ==
- List of football stadiums in the Netherlands
- Lists of stadiums
