= Jaap (given name) =

Jaap is a Dutch given name that is short for Jacob or Jacobus (Jacob or James in English). People with this name include:

== Academics ==
- Jaap R. Bruijn (1938–2022), Dutch maritime historian
- Jaap Doek (born 1942), Dutch jurist
- Jaap van Ginneken (born 1943), Dutch psychologist and communication scholar
- Jaap Goudsmit (born 1951), Dutch HIV/AIDS researcher
- Jaap M. Hemelrijk (1925–2018), Dutch archaeologist
- Jaap van den Herik (born 1947), Dutch computer scientist
- Jaap van der Hoeden (1891–1968), Dutch and Israeli veterinary research scientist
- Jacob Kistemaker (1917–2010), Dutch nuclear physicist
- Jaap Korevaar (1923–2025), Dutch mathematician
- Jaap Kruithof (1929–2009), Belgian philosopher and writer
- Jaap Kunst (1891–1960), Dutch ethnomusicologist
- Jaap Mansfeld (born 1936), Dutch philosopher and historian
- Jaap Murre (1929–2023), Dutch mathematician
- Jaap van Praag (1911–1981), Dutch humanist
- Jaap Schekkerman (born 1953), Dutch computer scientist
- Jaap Sinninghe Damsté (born 1959), Dutch paleontologist
- Jaap van der Vecht (1906–1992), Dutch entomologist
- Jaap van Velsen (1921–1990), Dutch-born British anthropologist
- Jaap J. Vermeulen (born 1955), Dutch botanist
- Jaap Wessels (1939–2009), Dutch mathematician
- Jaap de Wilde (born 1957), Dutch international relations scholar
- Jaap de Zwaan (born 1949), Dutch lawyer and legal scholar
- Jaap Zwemmer (born 1945), Dutch fiscal jurist

== Arts ==
- Jaap Bakema (1914–1981), Dutch modernist architect
- Jaap Berghuis (1945–2005), Dutch artist
- Jaap Blonk (born 1953), Dutch avant-garde composer and performance artist
- Jaap Drupsteen (born 1942), Dutch graphic designer
- Jaap Eggermont (born 1946), Dutch record producer
- Jaap Flier (1934–2022), Dutch dancer and choreographer
- Jaap Gestman Geradts (born 1951), Dutch pin-up artist
- Jaap Klinkhamer (1854–1928), Dutch architect
- Jaap Lamberton, Dutch comics artist
- Jaap ter Linden (born 1947), Dutch cellist, viol player and conductor
- Jaap Reesema (born 1984), Dutch singer
- Jaap Schreurs (1913–1983), Dutch painter and graphic artist
- Jaap Schröder (1925–2020), Dutch violinist, conductor, and pedagogue
- Jaap Spaanderman (1896–1985), Dutch pianist, cellist, and conductor
- Jaap Speyer (1891–1952), Dutch film director
- Jaap Stotijn (1891–1970), Dutch oboist
- Jaap Valkhoff (1910–1992), Dutch musician, composer and lyricist
- Jaap Vegter (1932–2003), Dutch cartoonist
- Jaap van Zweden (born 1960), Dutch violinist and conductor

== Politics ==
- Jaap van Amerongen (1913–1995), Dutch-Israeli economist and government official
- Jaap Boersma (1929–2012), Dutch Minister of Social Affairs
- Jaap Burger (1904–1986), Dutch Minister of the Interior
- Jaap de Hoop Scheffer (born 1948), Dutch Secretary General of NATO
- Jaap Marais (1922–2000), Afrikaner nationalist thinker, author and politician
- Jaap Metz (1941–2016), Dutch journalist and politician
- Jaap Oldenbroek (1897–1970), Dutch trade union leader and politician
- Jaap Pop (born 1941), Dutch mayor of Franeker, Tiel, Alkmaar and Haarlem
- Jaap Schrieke (1884–1976), Dutch jurist and administrator during WWII
- Jaap Smit (born 1957), Dutch preacher and trade unionist

== Sports ==
- Jaap Barendregt (1905–1952), Dutch footballer
- Jaap Beije (1927–2013), Dutch rower
- Jaap Boot (1903–1986), Dutch sprinter and long jumper
- Jaap Bulder (1896–1979), Dutch footballer
- Jaap-Derk Buma (born 1972), Dutch field hockey player
- Jaap Davids (born 1984), Dutch footballer
- Jaap van Dorp (born 1990), Dutch curler
- Jaap van Duijn (born 1990), Dutch footballer
- Jaap Eden (1873–1925), Dutch speed skater and racing cyclist
  - The Jaap Eden Award, Jaap Eden baan and Jaap Edenhal are named after him
- Jaap Enters (born 1939), Dutch rower
- Jaap Havekotte (1912–2014), Dutch speed skater
- Jaap Helder (1907–1998), Dutch sports sailor
- Jaap Kersten (born 1934), Dutch racing cyclist
- Jaap ten Kortenaar (born 1964), Dutch racing cyclist
- Jaap Knol (1896–1975), Dutch javelin thrower
- Jaap Kraaier (1913–2004), Dutch canoeist
- Jaap Krijtenburg (born 1969), Dutch rower
- Jaap van Lagen (born 1976), Dutch racing driver
- Jaap van der Leck (1911–2000), Dutch football manager
- Jaap Leemhuis (1941–2014), Dutch field hockey player
- Jaap Meijer (1905–1943), Dutch track cyclist
- Jaap Mol (1912–1972), Dutch footballer
- Jaap Oudkerk (born 1937), Dutch track cyclist
- Jaap van der Poll (1914–2010), Dutch javelin thrower
- Jaap van Praag (1910–1987), Dutch football administrator, chairman of Ajax
- Jaap Reesink (born 1946), Dutch rower
- Jaap Rijks (1919–2017), Dutch equestrian
- Jaap Schouten (born 1984), Dutch rower
- Jaap Sjouwerman (1891–1964), Dutch wrestler
- Jaap Stam (born 1972), Dutch football player and manager
- Jaap Stenger (1907–1992), Dutch rower
- Jaap Stockmann (born 1984), Dutch field hockey goalkeeper
- Jaap Voigt (born 1941), Dutch field hockey player
- Jaap Weber (1901–1979), Dutch footballer
- Jaap de Zeeuw (born 1954), Dutch sports sailor
- Jaap Zielhuis (born 1966), Dutch sports sailor

== Writers ==
- Jaap ter Haar (1922–1998), Dutch writer of children's books and historian
- Jaap Nunes Vaz (1906–1943), Dutch journalist, writer, and editor

== Other ==
- Jaap Amesz (born 1982), Dutch television personality
- Jaap Blokker (1942–2011), Dutch businessman and executive
- Jaap Haartsen (born 1963), Dutch electrical engineer and inventor of Bluetooth
- Jaap van Meekren (1923–1997), Dutch television journalist and presenter
- Jaap Penraat (1918–2006), Dutch resistance fighter during World War II
- Jaap Staal (1913–1981), Dutch commando during World War II
- Jaap Veldhuyzen van Zanten (1927–1977), Dutch aircraft captain and flight instructor
- Jaap Weideman (1936–1996), South African Navy officer

== See also ==
- Jaap Sahib, Sikh prayer
