= Team VVCS =

Football team

- Full name: Team Vereniging Voor Contract Spelers
- Founded: 2004
- Organiser: VVCS
- President: Danny Hesp
- Manager: John Lammers
- League: pre-season

Team VVCS is the football team of the Vereniging van Contractspelers (Association of contract Players) (VVCS) for professional footballers in the Netherlands without a contract. It was set up in 2004.

== History ==
During the preparation to the new football season Team VVCS organises a few practice matches with football clubs. In this way the players try to earn a contract at another club. In 2018, eight of the 16 players received contracts.

== Former players and managers of Team VVCS ==
- Gerard Aafjes
- Rui Almeida Monteiro
- Yassine Assa
- Lion Axwijk
- Henk Baum
- Jhon van Beukering
- Harvey Bischop
- Mounir Biyadat
- Peter Boeve (manager)
- Christy Bonevacia
- René Bot
- Job Bulters
- Christy Bonevacia
- Jaap Davids
- Jamal Dibi
- Jan van Dijk (manager)
- Mark van Dijk
- Ivar van Dinteren
- Barry Ditewig
- Dion Esajas
- Dwight Eind
- Robin Faber
- Reginald Faria
- Kasper de Fries Johansen
- Cerezo Fung a Wing
- Geoffery Galata
- Koen Garritsen
- Maicko Gerritsen
- Dean Guezen
- Dirk Heesen (manager)
- Pascal Heije
- Wouter van den Herik
- Jesper Hogedoorn
- Bas Jacobs
- Regilio Jacobs
- Co de Jager (assistant-manager)
- Marcio Junqueira
- Charles Kazlauskas
- Marcel Koning
- Erwin Koen
- Michael van der Kruis
- Quido Lanzaat
- Edwin Linssen
- Thomas Litjens
- Kevin Moeliker
- Robin Muller van Moppes
- Kiki Musampa
- Lesley Nahrwold
- Howard Nedd
- Giel Neervoort
- Bennie van Noord
- Roy Ouwerkerk
- Joeri Petrov
- Daniël Rijaard
- Sjack van Rijsbergen
- Revy Rosalia
- Jeffrey Sam-Sin
- Resham Sardar
- Regilio Seedorf
- Rocky Siberie
- Khalid Sinouh
- Kevin Sissing
- Ferry de Smalen
- Roel Stoffels
- Raphael Supusepa
- Stanley Tailor
- Brian Tevreden
- Barry Tjeertes
- Jason Trommel
- Cor Varkevisser
- Sjors Verdellen
- Geoffrey Verweij
- Kevin Vijgen
- Kevin Vink
- Rivelinho van der Vlugt
- Bas van Wegen
- Urgel Wijnaldum
- Henk Wisman (manager)
- Nordin Wooter
- Maarten Woudenberg
