= Hesp =

Hesp is a surname. Notable people with the surname include:

- Danny Hesp (born 1969), Dutch football defender
- Ruud Hesp (born 1965), Dutch football goalkeeper
