= FC Barcelona v Atlético Madrid (1999–2000 Copa del Rey) =

Football match in Barcelona, Spain

- Event: 1999–2000 Copa del Rey semi-final second leg
Barcelona	Atlético Madrid
- Abandoned before kick-off
- Date: 24 April 2000
- Venue: Camp Nou, Barcelona
- Referee: Manuel Díaz Vega
- Attendance: Around 200

On 24 April 2000, FC Barcelona refused to play a Copa del Rey semi-final second leg match against Atlético Madrid at Barcelona's Camp Nou. Due to international call-ups, injuries, and limits on promoting reserve team players, Barcelona had eleven eligible players, including two goalkeepers. Despite referee Manuel Díaz Vega informing Barcelona captain Pep Guardiola that the club had enough players to start the game, Barcelona refused to play.

The Royal Spanish Football Federation (RFEF) expelled Barcelona from the tournament, suspended the club from the next edition of the cup and issued a fine of 2 million Spanish pesetas. The suspension and fine were overturned after the re-election of Ángel María Villar as the federation's president.

== Background ==
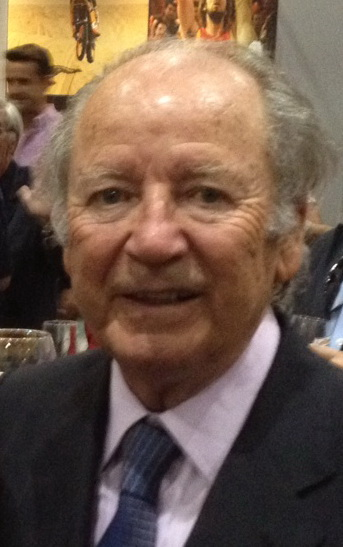
Barcelona president Josep Lluís Núñez stated that his club would not play the fixture on its scheduled date

On 12 April 2000, Atlético Madrid and FC Barcelona played the first leg of the Copa del Rey semi-final at Atlético's Vicente Calderón Stadium, with the hosts winning 3–0 through goals by Jimmy Floyd Hasselbaink, Rubén Baraja and Hugo Leal.

The date for the second leg, 26 April, coincided with international matches. Barcelona, managed by Dutchman Louis van Gaal, had several players called up to play for the Netherlands – Boudewijn Zenden, Phillip Cocu, Winston Bogarde, Patrick Kluivert, Michael Reiziger and Frank de Boer – as well as Rivaldo (Brazil), Jari Litmanen (Finland) and Luís Figo (Portugal). Three players were injured, and Royal Spanish Football Federation (RFEF) rules limited Barcelona to promoting no more than three players of the reserve team for the game.

Barcelona negotiated with Dutch national manager Frank Rijkaard (who would later manage the club), but he refused to release the players to Barcelona, as the Dutch needed to prepare ahead of co-hosting UEFA Euro 2000 in June.

After unsuccessfully trying to get the game postponed, Barcelona president Josep Lluís Núñez stated to the RFEF that his club would not play the second leg of the cup tie. He said "We cannot compete. And we don't intend to make fools of ourselves", and rhetorically asked if goalkeeper Ruud Hesp would have to play in attack.

== Match ==
Barcelona lined up for the game on the touchline with ten players: Ruud Hesp, Frédéric Déhu, Pep Guardiola, Abelardo, Sergi Barjuán, Dani, Simão Sabrosa, Xavi, Gabri and Carles Puyol. Back-up goalkeeper Francesc Arnau was also present, but did not form the line. In his role as captain, Guardiola walked to the centre circle to inform his Atlético counterpart Santi Denia and referee Manuel Díaz Vega that Barcelona would not play the match. Díaz Vega informed Guardiola that the Laws of the Game allow for a team to start a match with at least seven players, but Guardiola did not change his mind.

Barcelona returned to the changing rooms, leaving Atlético Madrid and the referee in a state of confusion, until Díaz Vega sent Atlético to get changed. Only around 200 supporters were at the game, and they booed and jeered the events.

== Reaction ==
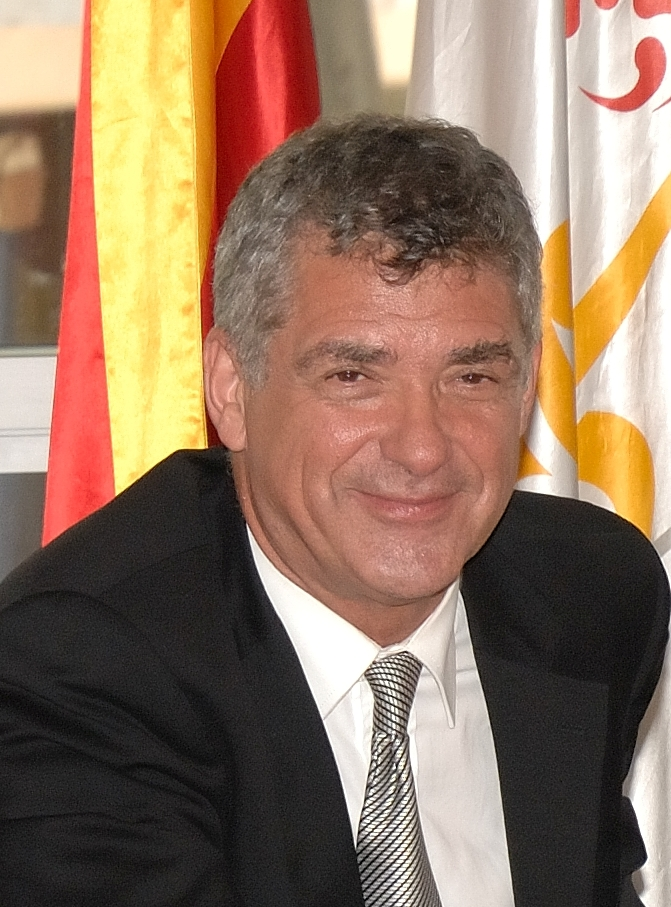
Ángel María Villar overturned Barcelona's punishments when he was re-elected as president of the Royal Spanish Football Federation (RFEF)

Barcelona issued a statement after the abandoned match, believing the fixture to have been "null and void" and a violation of "sporting, social and economic rights". It said that playing the match would lead to "adulteration, devaluation, and discrediting" of the cup, and that the game would have been a "farce" and a lack of respect to the opponents, fans, sponsors, and the tournament's patron, the king.

Madrid-based sports newspaper Diario AS printed the front-page headline "Pocos y cobardes" (Few and cowardly) and said that Núñez and Van Gaal had "stabbed" football.

The RFEF expelled Barcelona from the tournament and initially punished the club with a ban from the 2000–01 Copa del Rey, and a fine of 2 million Spanish pesetas (€12,000). The Comité Español de Disciplina Deportiva (CEDD; Spanish Committee of Sporting Discipline), upheld the punishment. However, Ángel María Villar was re-elected as president of the RFEF, and issued an amnesty of the suspension and fine.

Atlético Madrid forward Hasselbaink was serving a one-match suspension on the day of the abandoned game. Barcelona appealed to the RFEF that this suspension was not served, and that it should have been carried over to the crucial league game between the two teams on 29 April, or Barcelona's requested rescheduling of the cup game for 16 May. Denis Campbell of British newspaper The Guardian reacted to these events by writing "Barcelona seem to have declared war on the rest of the world" and "the club's arrogance grows by the day".
