= Association of Contract Players =

Trade union in Netherlands

- Vereniging van Contractspelers
- Abbreviation: VVCS
- Founded: 1 January 1961
- Headquarters: Hoofddorp, Netherlands
- Location: Netherlands
- Key people: Evgeniy Levchenko (president)
- Affiliations: FNV, FIFPro
- Website: www.vvcs.nl

The Association of Contract Players (Dutch: Vereniging van Contractspelers; VVCS) is the trade union for professional football players in the Netherlands. Established on 1 January 1961, it is a member of the Dutch Federation of Trade Unions and one of the three founding members of FIFPro, whom they share offices with.

Initiatives set up by the association include the VVCS Academy, which help players earn a diploma during their football careers, and Team VVCS, a team consisting of out-of-contract players looking for a new club.

== Presidents ==
1961: Theo Timmermans
1963: Gerard Kerkum
1967: Roel Wiersma
1975: Martin Snoeck
1978: Karel Jansen
1981: Arend Steunenberg
1983: Jim Janssen van Raaij
1980s: Theo van Seggelen
2015: Danny Hesp
2019: Evgeniy Levchenko
