= Bonevacia =

Bonevacia is a surname. Notable people with the surname include:

- Christy Bonevacia (born 1985), Curaçaoan football midfielder
- Liemarvin Bonevacia (born 1989), Dutch sprinter
- Roly Bonevacia (born 1991), Dutch-born football midfielder
