= Jaimy Brute =

Dutch football player

Personal information
- Date of birth: 15 April 1999 (age 27)
- Position: Defensive midfielder

Team information
- Current team: Rijnvogels
- Number: 7

Youth career
- VELO
- Haaglandia
- –2016: Sparta

Senior career*
Years	Team	Apps	(Gls)
2016–2020	Jong Sparta Rotterdam	67	(2)
2018–2020	Sparta	1	(0)
2021–2022	Anagennisi Ierapetra		
2021	Prespa Birlik		
2022–2025	Scheveningen	26	(0)
2025–	Rijnvogels		
- * Club domestic league appearances and goals as of 16 October 2024

Jaimy Brute (born 15 April 1999) is a Dutch footballer who plays as a midfielder for Rijnvogels.

== Club career ==
He made his Eerste Divisie debut for Sparta Rotterdam on 7 September 2018 in a game against FC Eindhoven as a 75th-minute substitute for Gregor Breinburg.

After spells in Sweden and on Crete, Brute joined Tweede Divisie side Scheveningen in 2022 only to move to Rijnvogels in 2025.
