= Barry Ditewig =

Dutch footballer

Personal information
- Full name: Barry Ditewig
- Date of birth: 14 October 1977 (age 49)
- Place of birth: Veenendaal, Netherlands
- Height: 1.91 m (6 ft 3 in)
- Position: Goalkeeper

Youth career
- VRC
- 1995–1996: Feyenoord

Senior career*
Years	Team	Apps	(Gls)
1996–1999	DOVO		
1999–2002	Heerenveen	7	(0)
2002–2004	Emmen	65	(0)
2004	SC Joure		
2005–2009	Veendam	157	(0)
2009–2010	ADO Den Haag	20	(0)
2010–2013	Achilles '29	89	(0)
2013–2016	Spakenburg	87	(0)
2016–2017	Alcides		
2017–2019	ONS Sneek	55	(0)
- * Club domestic league appearances and goals

Barry Ditewig (Dutch pronunciation: [ˈbɑri ˈditəʋɪx]; born 14 October 1977) is a Dutch retired footballer who played as a goalkeeper.

== Club career ==
Ditewig started his career at SC Heerenveen, and later played two seasons for FC Emmen. After the two seasons in Drenthe and a short spell at amateur club SC Joure, he went to play five successful seasons for BV Veendam where he was the first goalkeeper. However, in 2009, he was told that his contract would not be extended. He chose to play for Team VVCS, a team that tries to earn players without a contract another club. After some good performances, ADO Den Haag, whose had trouble finding keepers, chose to sign Ditewig.

In 2010, Ditewig signed with Achilles '29, an amateur team playing in the Topklasse, the new third division in Dutch football. Ditewig won in his second season this Topklasse and the title of best amateur club of the Netherlands against Spakenburg with 3-0 and 0–2. He would later join Spakenburg.

In 2016, Ditewig moved to MVV Alcides. From the 2018–19 season he played for ONS Sneek. He retired from football in September 2019.

== Outside football ==
Besides football, Ditewig is a sports masseur and studied physical therapy at the Hogeschool Arnhem Nijmegen.
