= FC Abcoude =

Dutch football club

- Full name: Football Club Abcoude
- Founded: 13 June 1973; 53 years ago
- Ground: Sportpark Hollandse Kade, Abcoude
- Chairman: Winand Paulissen
- Manager: Tonnie Bras
- League: Sunday Tweede Klasse B (West 1) (2025–26)
- Website: fcabcoude.nl
Home colours

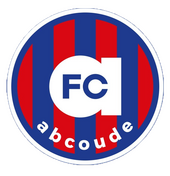
FC Abcoude logo

FC Abcoude is a football club based in the town of Abcoude, Utrecht, Netherlands, whose main team competes in the Tweede Klasse, the seventh tier of the Dutch football league system. Founded on 13 June 1973, the team plays its home matches at Sportpark Hollandse Kade.

== History ==
FC Abcoude was formed in 1973 through the merger of AFC '37 and RKSV Abekewalda. The club initially played in the fourth tier of the Amsterdam Football Association (AVB) before advancing to the national leagues of the Royal Dutch Football Association (KNVB), reaching the seventh-tier Tweede Klasse in 2010.

The club has a history of developing professional players, including Ruud Hesp, Edson Braafheid, Serginho Greene, and Matthijs de Ligt. Its first clubhouse opened in 1976, and in 2023, a new facility was inaugurated, funded largely by member contributions, sponsorships, and donations.

As of 2023, FC Abcoude has over 850 members and fields teams at both competitive and recreational levels, with a focus on youth development. The club also offers programs such as Walking Football and a G-team for players with disabilities.
