= Jaap Schreurs =

Dutch painter

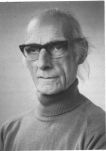
- Passport photograph of Schreurs
- Born: Jacobus Schreurs; 19 November 1913; The Hague, Netherlands
- Died: 16 February 1983 (aged 69); Utrecht, Netherlands
- Education: Jacobus Lambertus Keizer (father), later Christiaan de Moor and Francis de Erdely; Royal Academy of Art, The Hague and the Free Academy of Visual Art, The Hague
- Known for: Painting, drawing, printmaking
- Movement: neo-figurative

Jaap Schreurs (19 November 1913 in The Hague – 16 February 1983 in Utrecht) was a Dutch painter and graphic artist in the neo-figurative style.

== Life ==
Schreurs was born as Jacobus Schreurs in The Hague, Netherlands, to Jacobus Lambertus Keizer and his common-law wife Nelly Schreurs. His father was a painter in the style of the Hague School. As a child, Jaap often accompanied his father when he went into the countryside to paint the Dutch landscape, and he let the child have a go at it too. In his teens Schreurs joined a group of boys who went to the polders for the day, painting and drawing. Afterwards the boys' efforts were seriously examined and commented on by Jaap’s father, who insisted on the importance of perfection and professional skill .

In his adolescence Schreurs lost the sight of his right eye. From then on he had to live without the ability to see depth and perspective. He studied at the Royal Academy of Art and the Free Academy of Visual Art in The Hague. His teachers were Christiaan de Moor and Francis de Erdely. After he had finished his studies, he installed himself as a professional painter, and led the life of a poor but hard-working artist. During World War II he had to go into hiding because he refused to sign the so-called ‘declaration of Aryan descent’ (‘Ariërverklaring’), which the Nazi racial policy required from every artist. From that moment on, he was punishable by law. Schreurs moved to Utrecht in the early 1950s. He led a rather secluded life and refused to become a member of an art society or to conform to any contemporary school of painting. He wanted to develop his own style independently and had no ambition to become a career painter. He also declined the BKR artist subsidy and its forerunners the Dutch state granted to artists from 1949 onwards because he objected to such subsidies in principle. In 1983 Schreurs died of a cardiac arrest.

== Legacy ==
Upon his death he left behind over a thousand paintings, gouaches, drawings, etchings and linocuts. His relatives consulted eight experts from prominent Dutch museums, art magazines, and auctioneering firms. These unanimously judged the quality and originality of the work positively; many pieces were judged to be of museum quality. They advised prudent and professional management of the collection. The legacy has been catalogued and can be viewed on a website (see external links below).

== Painting style ==
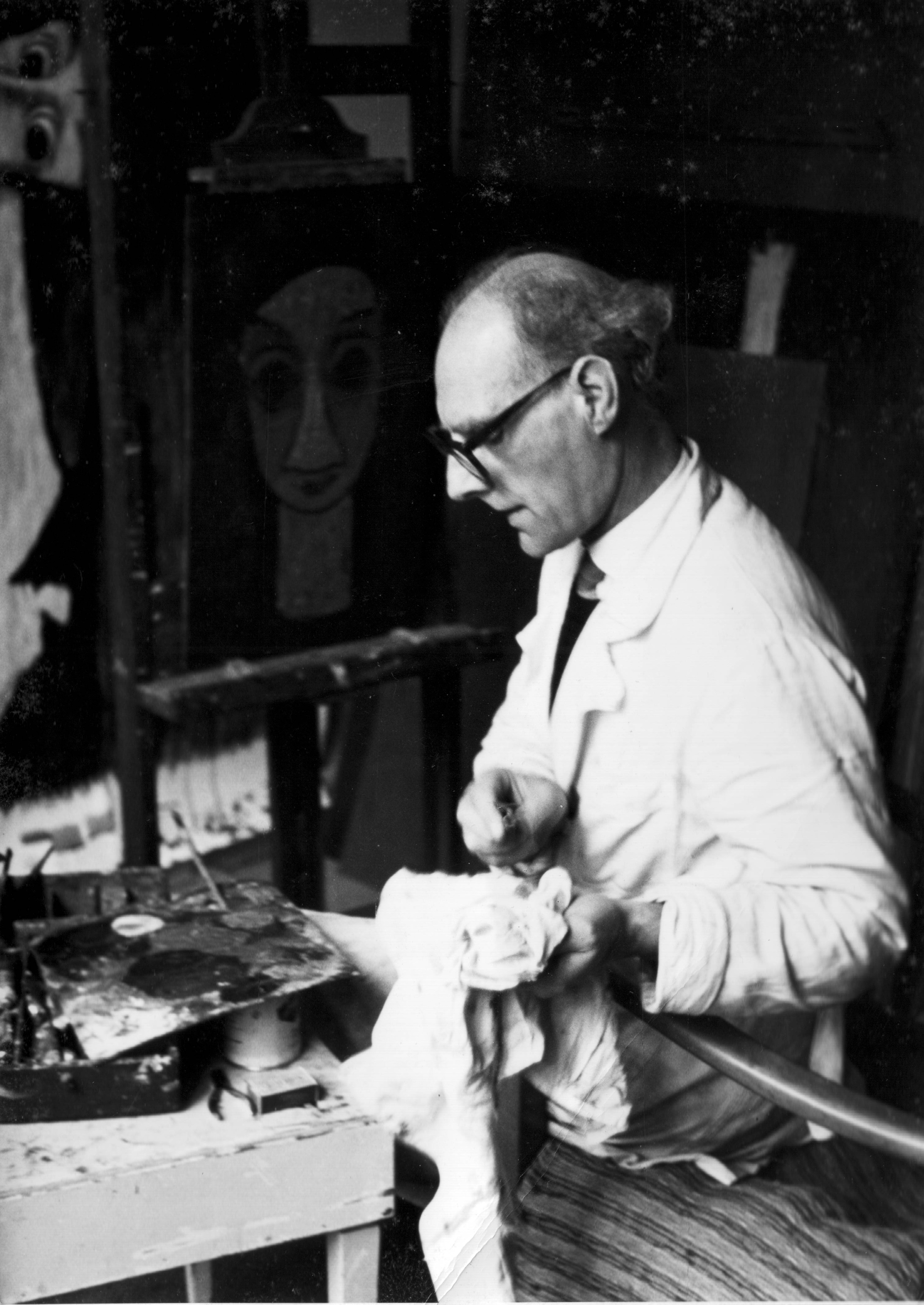
The artist at work in his studio

=== Influences ===
Schreurs’ style has been visibly influenced by three factors, namely

1. Loss of eyesight: ophthalmologist dr. Philippe Lanthony from the Hôpital des Quinze-Vingts at Paris has examined how Schreurs’ loss of binocular vision influenced his painting. The inability to see depth and perspective in the usual way forced Schreurs either to avoid painting depth, or to find other solutions. Moreover, monocular vision often stimulates a painter to pay extra attention to the eyes of his figures. Lanthony shows how in Schreurs’ work this effect may be observed in his paintings of figures with very large dark eyes, as well as in his tendency to emphasize and exaggerate differences between the two eyes of his figures.
2. Contact with the underprivileged and the disabled: Schreurs’ life spanned the Great Depression of the 1930s and World War II. For financial reasons Schreurs could only afford as his models the homeless he found at the shelter of the Salvation Army. Moreover, the effects of bombing, razzias, deportation, poverty, the lack of social services and health care, the famine and all of its concomitant scenes of survival of the fittest – at the cost of others – were all visible on the streets. After the war, he saw how the very same mechanisms were still operating, albeit below the surface. His fascination with outcasts and vulnerable people is reflected in many of his paintings, in particular the ones from the last 20 years of his life.
3. Psychological realism: Schreurs’ life spanned not only political and economic upheaval, but also a turbulent period in the Dutch art world. “... he was caught between the legacy of the Hague School and the rise of the Cobra movement. Artistic styles collided, clashed, and overlapped; the central struggle between abstract art and realism was relentless...”, writes art historian Guus van den Hout, “Schreurs was aware of the significance of abstract art movements, and he did not refuse to acknowledge them; the influence of artists such as Picasso, Modigliani and Morandi on his work is undeniable... but as an artist he remained loyal to the realist tradition.” In his later work, however, in many paintings the figures are severely deformed. These deformations function as a mirror of their inner sufferings and conflicts. That is why art historian Quarles van Ufford has titled her essay The Inside Out. Schreurs once used the term ‘psychological realism’ for these poignant paintings. Although this is a technical term from literary theory, it is an applicable characterisation.

=== Chronology ===
Although Schreurs only rarely signed and dated his works, Quarles van Ufford shows that the oeuvre can be roughly divided into three periods, each with its own characteristics.

1. 1930–1950: His early paintings are mainly in oil on canvas. The style is naturalistic, some of the works clearly showing the influence of contemporary painters he admired such as Jan Sluijters, Charley Toorop and Constant Permeke. Various art reviewers also connected Schreurs’ early paintings with Hieronymus Bosch and Breughel. The main themes are figures, portraits, still-lives, and religious scenes. The colouring is rather dark, mostly purple, brown, red and sometimes green.
2. 1950–1965: Most works from these years are painted in light colours in acrylic on hardboard. The themes are highly stylized figures and faces, depicted two-dimensionally with their contours in dark outlines, some with elongated necks and/or extremely long and thin limbs. Their atmosphere is mostly quiet, introvert.
3. 1965–1983: In this period, Schreurs returns to themes already present in his earliest work, such as his compassion and his respect for disabled, neglected and demented people. Often the meaning of inner conflicts, despair or impotence is represented by deformation and/or reinforced by the size of the painting. As Van den Hout describes it, “Schreurs confronts the viewer with the harsh reality of existence....Yet they (the paintings) are doing exactly what art should do: they facilitate and encourage understanding, contemplation and reflection.” Another earlier theme he returned to after 1965 is the suffering of Christ, concentrating on the feet of the Crucified. The works from this third period are however much more poignant and emphasise the connection between the suffering of Christ and the suffering of humanity. Not all paintings from this period are in this confrontational style. Other works radiate a peaceful, introverted, or resigned atmosphere.

=== Graphics ===
During the last twenty years of his life Schreurs possessed an etching press. He liked experimenting with all kinds of unusual materials in order to create special effects. His graphic oeuvre runs to nearly four hundred pieces and shows a great variety of themes and styles.

=== Exhibitions (a selection) ===
- 1943 – Frans Halsmuseum, Haarlem, in an exhibition of contemporary art.
- 1944 – Rijksmuseum, Amsterdam, in an exhibition of contemporary art.
- 1944 – Pulchri Studio, The Hague, in an exhibition of contemporary art.
- 1949 – Hofwijck, Voorburg
- 1959 – Achter de Dom, Utrecht
- 1960 – De Eshof, Norg, Drenthe
- 1983 – VARA Studio, Hilversum
- 1992/93 – Jester Art Gallery, Amsterdam
- 1994 – Stadsmuseum, Woerden
- 1994/95 – VU University Amsterdam
- 1995 – Museum De Wieger, Deurne, in an exhibition about the image of Christ in modern art.
- 1995 – Museum Catharijneconvent, Utrecht, in an exhibition about the image of Christ in modern art.
- 2000 – Museum ‘Our Dear Lord in the Attic’, Amsterdam
- 2010 – Dom Church, Utrecht
- 2011 – CHE University of Applied Sciences, Ede
- 2012 – Gemeentemuseum The Hague, in Summer Expo.
- 2015 – Museum Arnhem, in an exhibition of artworks bought by the Dutch government.
- 2019 – Zomerexpo 19, ′De Liefde en de Kunst weerstaan alles′ (digital exhibition of 14 selected works)

=== External links ===
- website dedicated to the work of Jaap Schreurs
- website 'save the work of JS from oblivion'
- page in dutch national artist database
- utrecht artist index
- a few works
