= Mateus (footballer, born April 1983) =

Brazilian footballer

Personal information
- Full name: Mateus Versolato Júnior
- Date of birth: April 9, 1983 (age 43)
- Place of birth: São Bernardo do Campo, Brazil
- Height: 1.88 m (6 ft 2 in)
- Position: Goalkeeper

Youth career
- 2001–2002: São Paulo

Senior career*
Years	Team	Apps	(Gls)
2003–2009	São Paulo		
2006	→ Bragantino (loan)		
2007	→ Fortaleza (loan)		
2008	→ Santo André (loan)		
2009	→ Nacional-AM (loan)		
2011	Rio Claro		
- * Club domestic league appearances and goals

Mateus Versolato Júnior or simply Mateus (born 9 April 1983) is a Brazilian former football goalkeeper.

== Career ==
In July 2010, Mateus trained with Dutch Eerste Divisie club Telstar and, after impressing on trial, was reportedly offered a contract on the club's standard salary terms; the move ultimately did not materialise, and on 10 August, Telstar signed Cor Varkevisser instead.

== Honours ==
- São Paulo State League: 2005
- Brazilian League: 2006
