= Cor Varkevisser =

Dutch footballer (born 1982)

Personal information
- Date of birth: 14 May 1982 (age 44)
- Place of birth: Leiden, Netherlands
- Height: 1.94 m (6 ft 4 in)
- Position: Goalkeeper

Youth career
- Quick Boys
- Feyenoord

Senior career*
Years	Team	Apps	(Gls)
2000–2001	Feyenoord	0	(0)
2001–2005	Excelsior	70	(0)
2005–2007	VVV-Venlo	26	(0)
2007–2010	Sparta Rotterdam	14	(0)
2010–2016	Telstar	147	(0)
Total		257	(0)

International career
1998	Netherlands U17	1	(0)
1999–2000	Netherlands U19	17	(0)
- * Club domestic league appearances and goals

Cor Varkevisser (born 14 May 1982) is a Dutch former professional footballer who played as a goalkeeper.

== Club career ==
Varkevisser was born in Leiden and raised in Katwijk, where he came through the youth system of Quick Boys. On 30 August 1996, aged 14, he was named in the senior matchday squad for a KNVB Cup tie against HFC Haarlem, remaining an unused substitute behind Richard Hartevelt. At 16, he moved to the academy of Feyenoord in Rotterdam, where his teammates included future Netherlands international Robin van Persie.

In 2001, Varkevisser joined Excelsior and made his professional debut that season in an Eerste Divisie away match against Heracles Almelo. He spent four seasons with the club, making appearances in both the Eerste Divisie and the Eredivisie.

Varkevisser signed for VVV-Venlo in 2005, before returning to Rotterdam two years later to join Sparta as back-up to Harald Wapenaar. An early injury to Wapenaar led the club to sign Sander Westerveld, which pushed Varkevisser down the pecking order. He remained at Sparta for three years, leaving in the summer of 2010 following the team's relegation from the Eredivisie.

Shortly before the start of the 2010–11 season, he joined Telstar after the club's intended signing of Brazilian goalkeeper Mateus fell through. Varkevisser established himself as first choice and held the position over several seasons. In May 2016, Quick Boys announced his return to Katwijk for the following season, but the move was cancelled in July due to a knee injury. He subsequently retired from playing and later worked as goalkeeping coach at Telstar from 2017 to 2020.

== International career ==
At youth level, Varkevisser represented the Netherlands under-17s and was later involved with the under-18s/under-19s—including at the 2000 UEFA European Under-18 Championship.

== Post-playing career ==
After ending his professional involvement in football, Varkevisser settled in IJmuiden, where he pursued a business career. He became co-owner and operator of Grand Café Staal, a hospitality venue in the town centre. The café opened shortly before the COVID-19 pandemic, which temporarily forced its closure, but reopened in mid-2020 as restrictions were eased.

Varkevisser later combined his business activities with a role in local sport, working with Sporting Leiden and fellow coach Patrick Heeringa before their collaboration concluded at the end of the 2023–24 season.
