= Dirk Heesen =

Dutch footballer (born 1969)

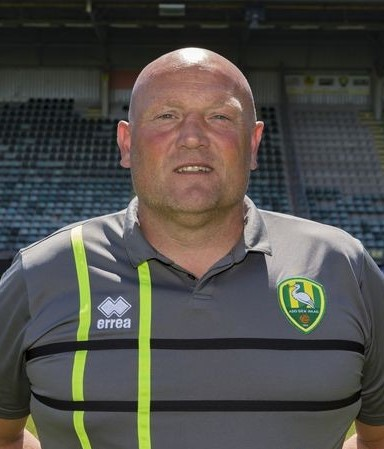
- Heesen with ADO Den Haag in 2017

Personal information
- Date of birth: 15 September 1969 (age 57)
- Place of birth: Utrecht, Netherlands
- Position: Defender

Senior career*
Years	Team	Apps	(Gls)
1988–1990	Utrecht	5	(0)
1989–1990	→ Wageningen (loan)	25	(0)
1990–1992	Wageningen	70	(5)
1992–1998	FC Den Haag	185	(24)
1998–2002	FC Oss	119	(9)
Total		404	(38)

International career
1989-1991	Netherlands U21	0	(0)
1992	Netherlands Olympic	1	(0)

Managerial career
- 2010–2012: FC Oss
- 2012: Team VVCS
- 2013–2015: Willem II (Assistant)
- 2015: Guangzhou Evergrande U-19
- 2015–2016: QPR (Assistant)
- 2017–2020: ADO Den Haag (Assistant)
- 2019: ADO Den Haag (caretaker)
- 2023–2024: Beerschot (Assistant)
- * Club domestic league appearances and goals

Dirk Heesen (born 15 September 1969) is a Dutch professional football coach and former player who most recently was assistant coach at Beerschot.

== Playing career ==
Heesen played for Utrecht, Wageningen, ADO Den Haag and FC Oss in a career that spanned from 1988 to 2002.

He was an unused substitute for the Netherlands national under-21 football team in a game against the USA in 1989 and against Finland in 1991. He did play once for the Olympic team.

== Managerial career ==
After retiring in 2002, Heesen began coaching at FC Oss and continued in an assisting role until 2010, when he was appointed their manager. Heesen remained as Oss' manager until 2012, winning them promotion from the Topklasse Sunday League in the process. In 2012, he was head coach of Team VVCS. Heesen then worked as assistant of Willem II from 2013 to 2015. He worked in China in 2015 with Guangzhou Evergrande as a coach before moving on 15 December 2015 to Queens Park Rangers as the first team coach. Heesen left that role in November 2016, and rejoined ADO Den Haag where he played in the '90s, as an assistant coach in February 2017. After leaving ADO, Heesen became assistant manager alongside Dirk Kuyt at Jupiler Pro League team Beerschot. He left them reportedly for private reasons at the end on 2024.

== Personal life ==
His son Sky also played for ADO Den Haag.
