= Jaap van Duijn =

Dutch footballer

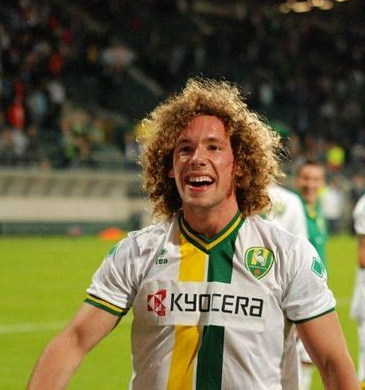

Personal information
- Date of birth: 23 December 1990 (age 35)
- Place of birth: Katwijk, Netherlands
- Height: 1.86 m (6 ft 1 in)
- Position: Striker

Youth career
- Quick Boys
- 2008–2009: PSV
- 2009–2010: Feyenoord

Senior career*
Years	Team	Apps	(Gls)
2010–2011	Quick Boys	32	(18)
2011–2012	ADO Den Haag	1	(0)
2012–2013	Spakenburg	29	(9)
2013–2015	Quick Boys	44	(19)
2015–2016	Noordwijk	27	(31)
2016–2021	Rijnvogels	3	(1)
- * Club domestic league appearances and goals as of 20 August 2016

Jaap van Duijn (born 23 December 1990) is a Dutch retired footballer who played as a striker.

== Club career ==
Van Duijn grew up with hometown club Quick Boys and became as A junior plucked by PSV. In Eindhoven played the winger in PSV A1 and the team promise. The adventure in Brabant was not followed and Van Duijn moved to Feyenoord. In Rotterdam, he got the chance in the team promise. At the beginning of the 2010–2011 season Jaap van Duijn joined selecting Quick Boys. Thanks to a flying start, Van Duijn scored nine goals in the first half of the season and he aroused the interest of several professional football clubs. Ultimately, the choice of ADO Den Haag fell.

He made his debut on 21 July in the Europa League match against FK Tauras Tauragė. In the Eredivisie he made his debut in the 4–2 defeat to FC Groningen. Van Duijn made an energetic start at the Residence Club and, thanks to his striking hair, quickly became a crowd favorite. The adventure ultimately ended on a sour note. Van Duijn decided to call it quits after being sent back to the amateurs. Following one season of relegation football at Spakenburg, the prodigal son returned to Quick Boys.

From the summer of 2013 he played for Quick Boys, but left them after two seasons for fellow amateurs VV Noordwijk. He then moved on to FC Rijnvogels in 2016. He retired in 2021, citing he could not play at the highest amateur level anymore alongside his work in the family business.

== Career statistics ==
year	team	caps	goals	yellow card	red card
2010–2011	Quick Boys	32	18	2	0
2011–2012	ADO Den Haag	2	0	0	0
2012–2013	SV Spakenburg	29	9	4	0
2013–2014	Quick Boys	24	10	3	0
2014–2015	Quick Boys	20	9	2	0
2015–2016	VV Noordwijk	27	31	0	1
2016–2017	FC Rijnvogels	3	1	0	0
total	–	136	68	11	1

other statistics (exhibition game)

year	team	caps	goals	yellow card	red card
2014 –2015	Quick Boys	3	0	0	0
2015 –2016	VV Noordwijk	7	3	0	0

== Honours ==
- hoofdklasse A Saturday: 2010–2011 (runner-up)
- hoofdklasse B Saturday: 2014-2015 (runner-up)
- hoofdklasse B Saturday: 2015-2016 (runner-up)
