= Katwijk =

Municipality in South Holland, Netherlands

- Municipality
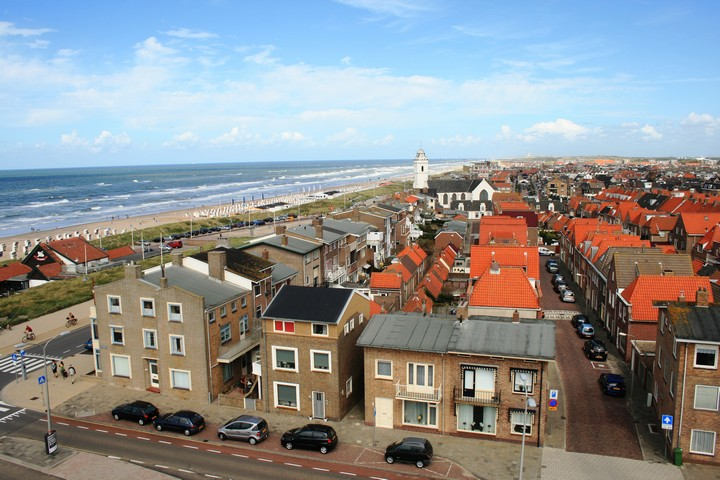
- View over Katwijk aan Zee

- Flag Coat of arms

- Location in South Holland
- Coordinates: 52°12′N 4°25′E
- Country: Netherlands
- Province: South Holland

Government
  - Body: Municipal council
  - Mayor: Nathanaël Middelkoop (SGP)

Area
  - Total: 31.15 km^{2} (12.03 sq mi)
  - Land: 24.75 km^{2} (9.56 sq mi)
  - Water: 6.40 km^{2} (2.47 sq mi)
- Elevation: 5 m (16 ft)

Population (1 August 2020)
  - Total: 65,929
  - Density: 2,666/km^{2} (6,900/sq mi)
- Demonym: Katwijker
- Time zone: UTC+1 (CET)
  - Summer (DST): UTC+2 (CEST)
- Postcode: 2220–2239
- Area code: 071
- Website: www.katwijk.nl

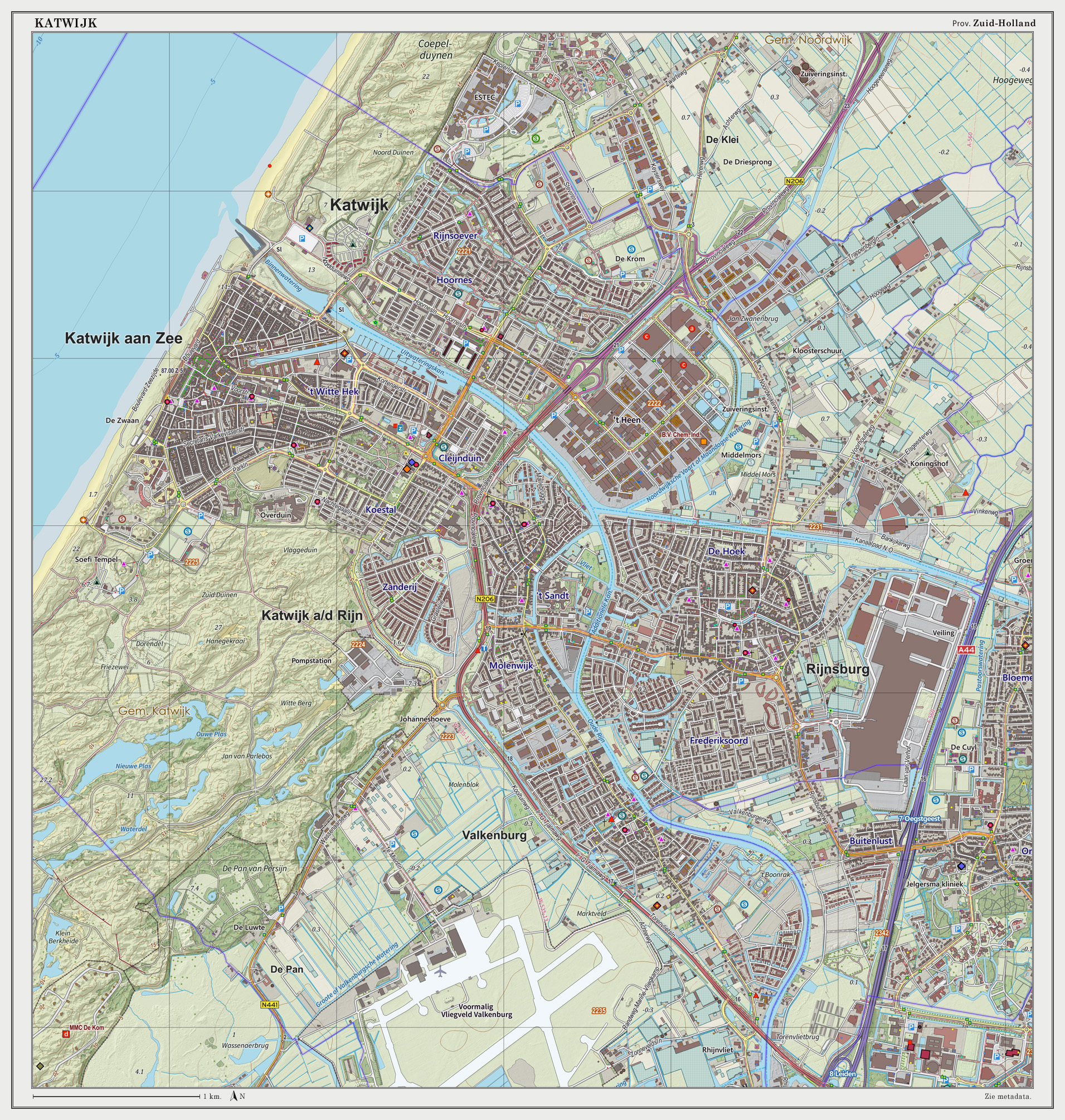
Dutch topographic map of Katwijk (urban area), March 2014

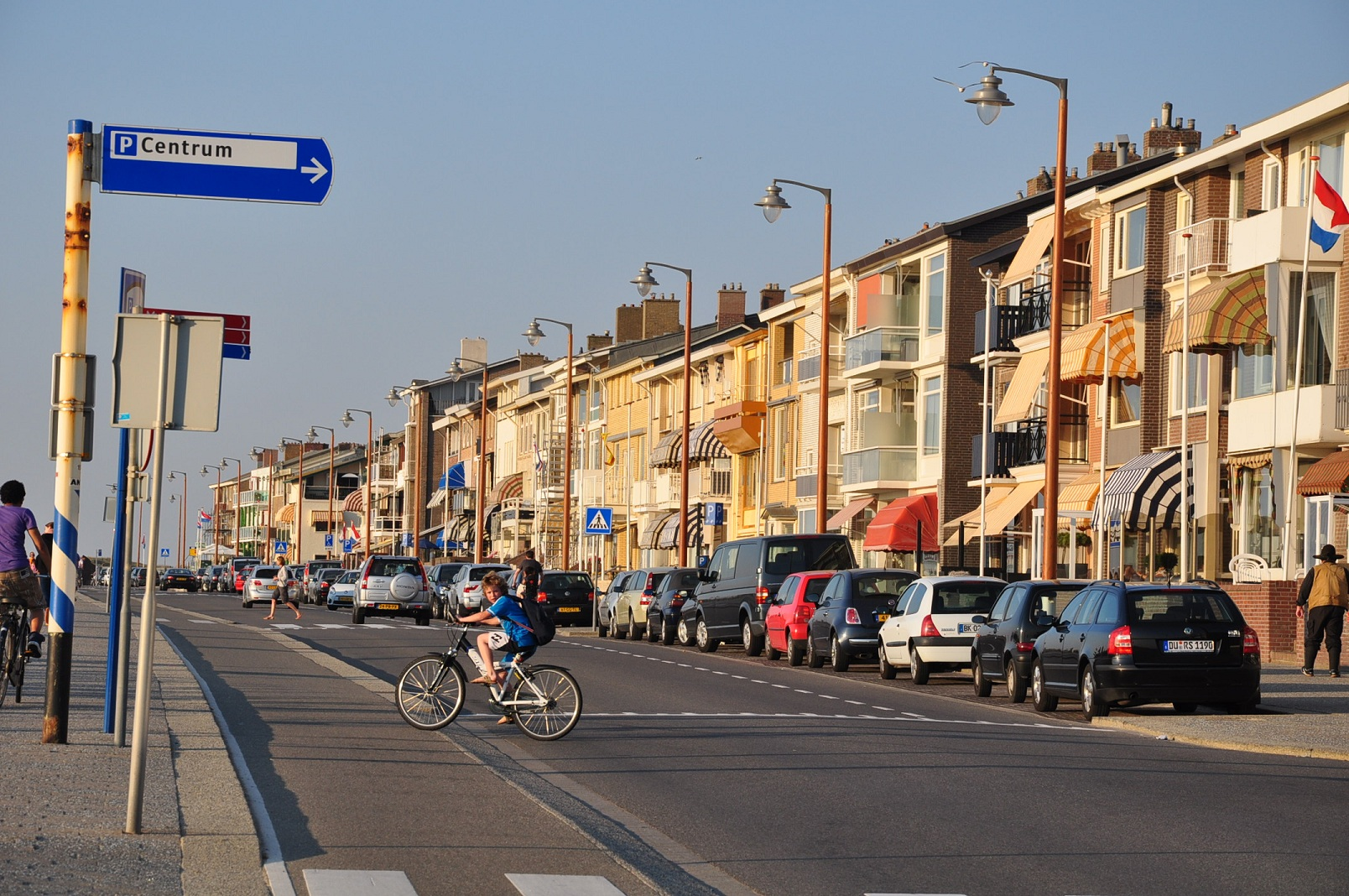
Coastal boulevard in Katwijk

Katwijk (Dutch pronunciation: [ˈkɑtʋɛik]) is a coastal municipality and town in the province of South Holland, which is situated in the mid-western part of the Netherlands. Katwijk is located on the North Sea, northwest of Leiden and 16 km north of The Hague. The Oude Rijn ("Old Rhine") river flows through the town and into the North Sea.

In August 2020, Katwijk had a population of 65,929 and covers an area of 31.15 km^{2} (12.03 sq mi), of which 6.40 km^{2} (2.47 sq mi) is water. It shares its borders with the municipalities of Noordwijk, Teylingen, Oegstgeest, Leiden, and Wassenaar.

Katwijk is by far the largest town in the Duin- en Bollenstreek ("Dune and Bulb Region"). Katwijk is one of the few remaining in that region that observes the Sunday rest by local law.

== Districts ==
The town consists of a number of districts, including namesakes Katwijk aan den Rijn and Katwijk aan Zee. On 1 January 2005 the various districts had the following populations:

- Katwijk aan den Rijn (5,916)
- Katwijk aan Zee (22,405)
- Katwijk-Noord (13,845)
- Rijnsburg (15,450)
- Valkenburg (3,904)

Lying on the coast, Katwijk aan Zee is (and has always been) the larger town. Katwijk aan den Rijn lies just slightly inland. Rijnsburg is situated east of Katwijk aan den Rijn whereas Valkenburg finds itself to the south. Katwijk-Noord is situated north of Katwijk aan Zee.

Although consisting of historically separate towns (except Katwijk-Noord) that still today maintain separate identities, the towns have more or less grown together and merged into a single conurbation. The creation of the municipality of Katwijk is a recognition of that fact. The town hall of the current municipality of Katwijk is located in Katwijk aan den Rijn, near the boundary of Katwijk aan Zee. All these districts lie along the Oude Rijn.

== History ==
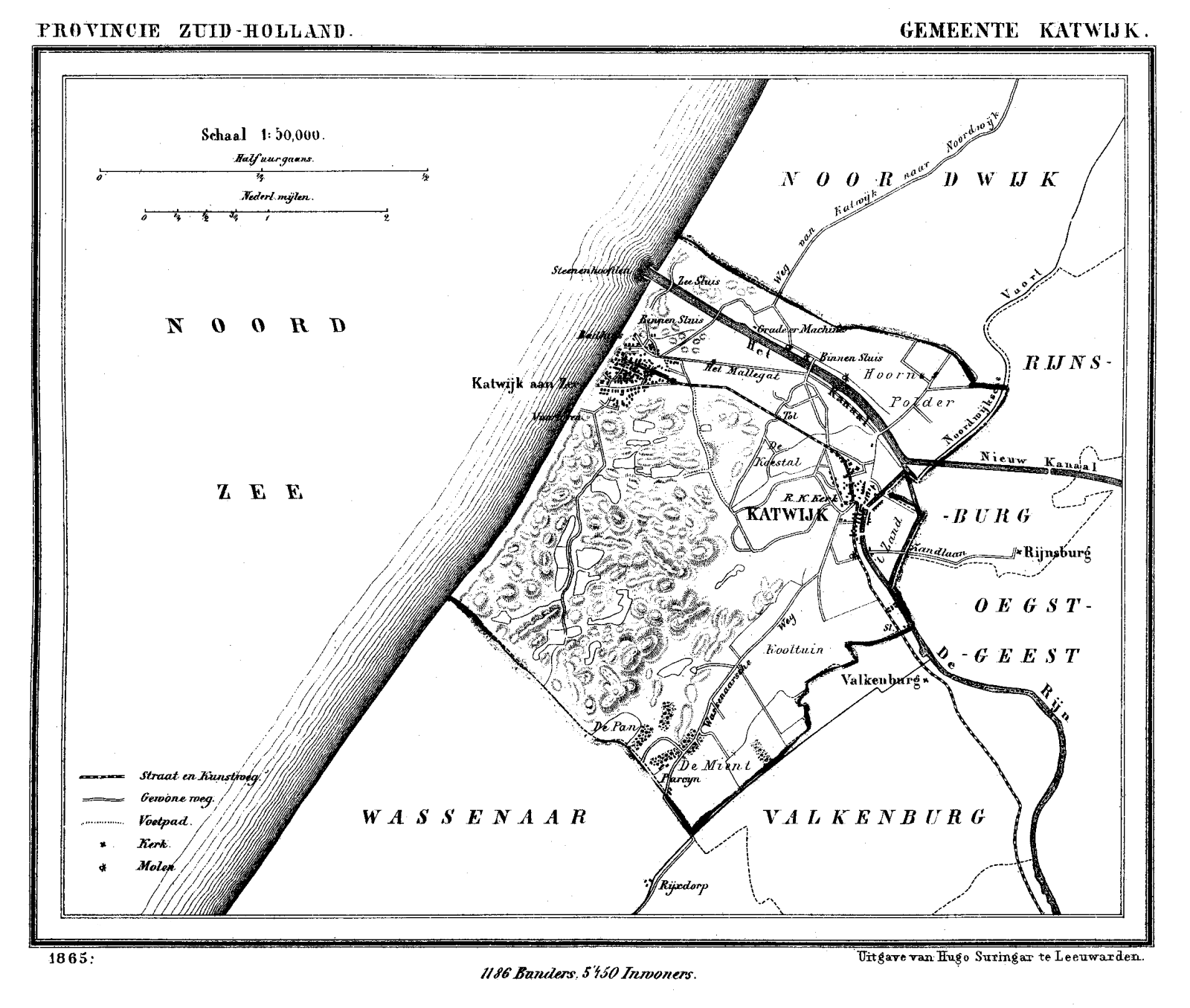
Katwijk in 1865.

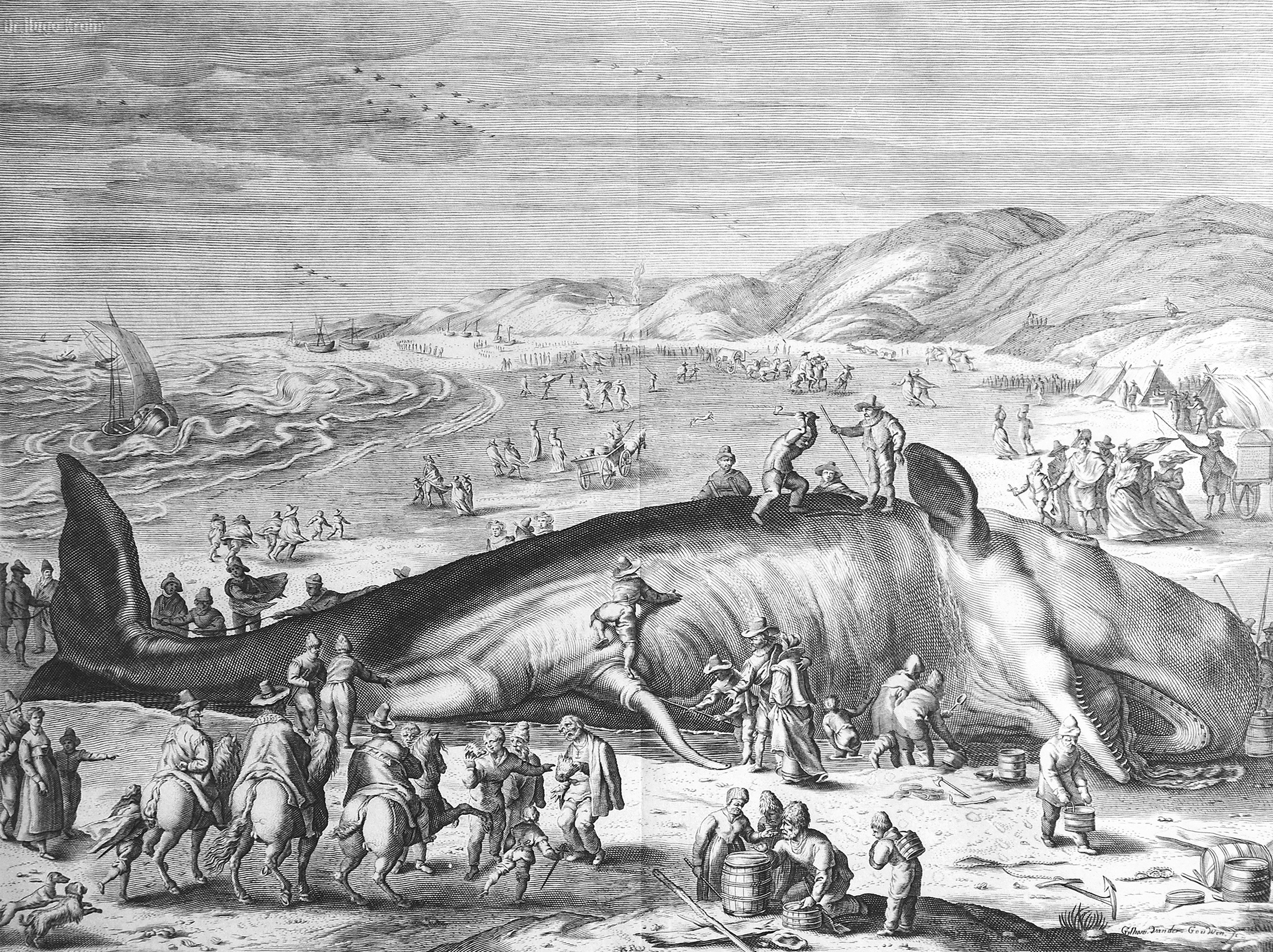
This engraving by William van der Gouwen shows a twenty-meter (70 feet) long whale, which on the third of February, 1598 was stranded on the Dutch coast between Scheveningen and Katwijk.

The name "Katwijk" probably has its origins in the name of a Germanic tribe called the Chatten (Chatti). The Dutch word "wijk" means "area", so the name probably meant something like "the Chatti area".

In Roman times, Katwijk was a place of strategic importance. It was located at the Roman Empire's northern border, at the mouth of the Rhine river, which in Roman times was larger in this area than it is today. There was a good deal of traffic along the Rhine. Katwijk was also a jumping-off point for the voyage to Britain.

Built during the reign of Emperor Claudius (41-54), the town's name was Lugdunum Batavorum. The town's name was later associated with the name of the city of Leiden, but this is now thought to be incorrect.

In 1231, the first reference to Catwijck appeared in records.

The history of the modern municipality of Katwijk is essentially the history of its constituent parts, which for each village extends back to Roman times. However, Katwijk aan Zee, Katwijk aan den Rijn and Valkenburg were part of the same heerlijkheid called "Beide de Katwijken en 't Zand" (or something similar). They have been administratively joined for centuries despite their differing characters. Katwijk aan Zee was a fishing town and Katwijk aan den Rijn had an agricultural character.

During World War II, Katwijk aan Zee was heavily damaged. On 1 May 1942 beach access was no longer permitted and large scale evacuation took place. From October 1943 houses were demolished as part of the construction of the Atlantic Wall.

On 1 January 2006, Rijnsburg and Valkenburg were also merged into the municipality, it's called nowadays Katwijk.

== Public transportation ==
Katwijk is a larger town in the Netherlands without a railway station, and the largest without any railway connection. The nearest railway stations are Voorhout and Leiden. Katwijk is connected by bus with Noordwijk, Leiden, The Hague and Lisse. The public transport by bus is served by Arriva. As of 9 December 2012 new buslines came to Katwijk. In December 2023 Q-Buzz is going to take over the buslines in Katwijk.

Between 2019 and 2023 a lot changed in Katwijk and Leiden. A quick bus line from Katwijk to Leiden, a Q-Liner, numbers 430 and 431, drive from Leiden to Katwijk aan Zee (Boulevard-South) and the other (430) goes to the space agency ESTEC, and returns to Leiden after a short stop. It took years to make the Ir. Tjalmaweg (a part of the N206), a double two-sided road. See here:

=== Trams ===
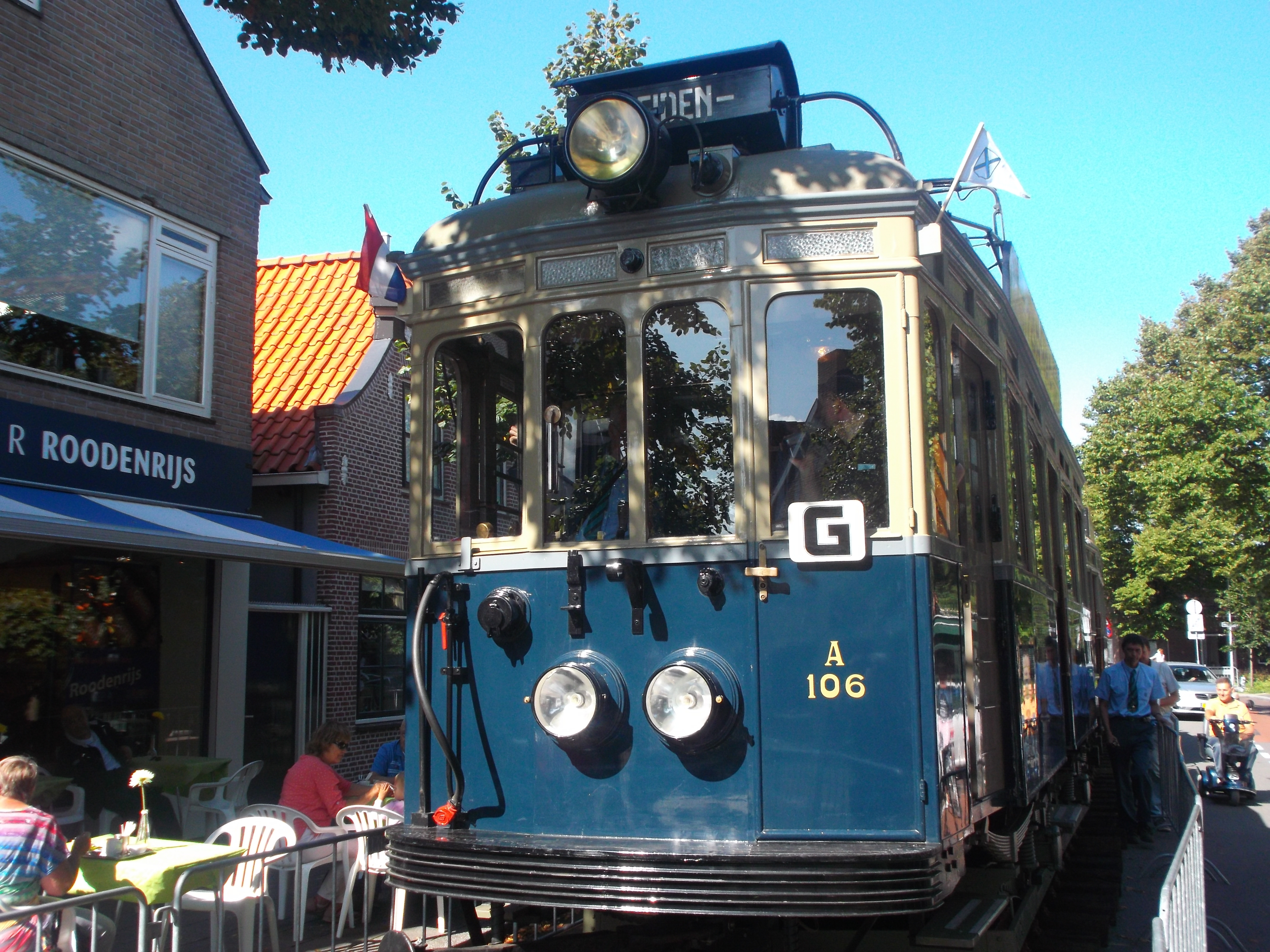
NZH Blue tram at the Rijnstraat on a celebrational heritage service, over 60 years after the abolishment of the interlocal tramway in and around Katwijk.

=== Bus transportation ===
- Bus 400 - Travels from Noordwijk ESA ESTEC (very close to Katwijk, outside built-up areas in Noordwijk) via Biltlaan, Gemeentehuis, Valkenburg and N206 to Leiden Centraal, Zoeterwoude, and Zoetermeer. During the day, this bus departs every 15 minutes in every direction.
- Bus 401 - Travels from Katwijk Boulevard-Zuid via Vuurbaak, Boulevard, Tramstraat and Zeeweg to the N206 to Leiden Centraal, Zoeterwoude, and Zoetermeer. During the day, this bus departs every 15 minutes (every 10 minutes during morning rush hour).
- Bus 23 - Travels from Leiden Centraal to Noordwijk, with 2 stops in Katwijk and Valkenburg.
- Bus 30 - Travels from Leiden Centraal to Noordwijk, with 13 stops in Katwijk and Rijnsburg. Several of these stops are in the industrial zone 't Heen.
- Bus 31 - Travels from Leiden Centraal to Willem van der Bergh, with 25 stops in Katwijk and Rijnsburg. Several of these stops are on the Boulevard.
- Bus 38 - Travels from Leiden Centraal to Vliegveld Valkenburg, with stops at the AZC and Unmanned Valley.
- Bus 38 - Travels from Katwijk Raadhuis via Kon. Julianalaan and Zanderij through Valkenburg to Leiden Centraal, once an hour.
- Bus 385 - Travels from Den Haag Centraal to Noordwijk, with 9 stops in Katwijk.

Additionally, Rijnsburg and the far northeastern part of Katwijk-Noord are served by bus 20 and 21, running between Noordwijk and Leiden. Peak hour buses connect industrial zones with surrounding municipalities.

== Sport ==
The municipality has multiple football clubs: VV Katwijk, Quick Boys and Rijnsburgse Boys are all semi-professional Tweede Divisie clubs, whereas FC Rijnvogels and Valken '68 are amateur club playing further down the league pyramid.

Grasshoppers Katwijk, are a basketball club established in 1971, playsling its home games at Cleijn Duin. Its women's team plays in the VBL, the domestic first tier, whereas the men's team plays in the Promotiedivisie, the domestic second tier.

== Notable people ==
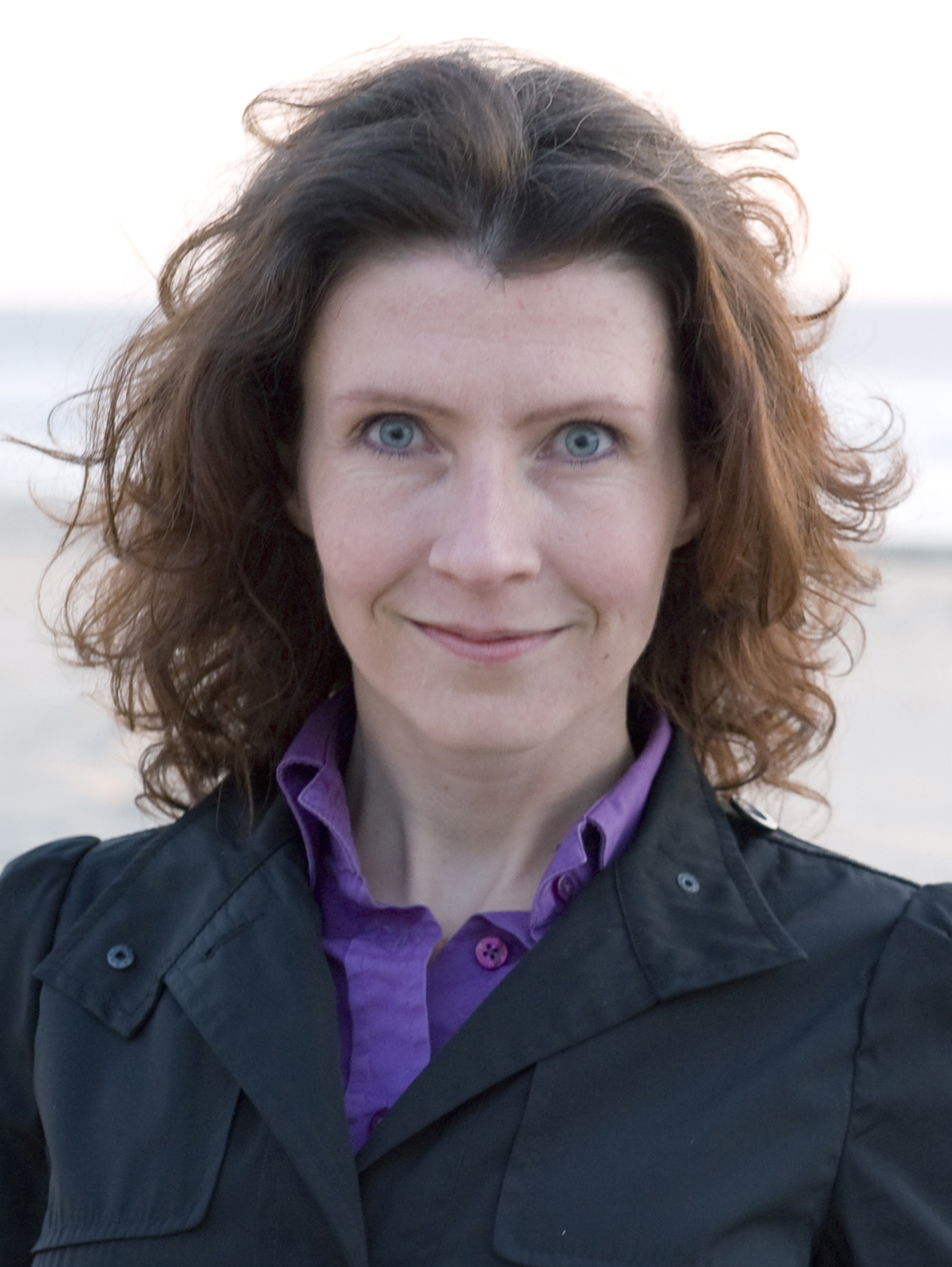
Esther Ouwehand, 2010

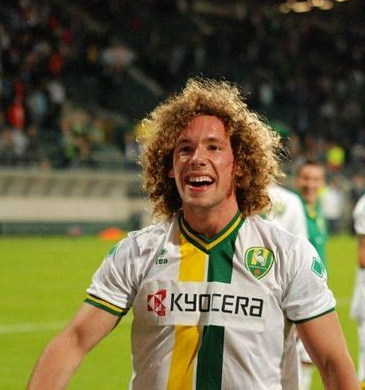
Jaap van Duijn, 2011

- Charley Toorop (1891 in Katwijk – 1955) a Dutch painter and lithographer
- Esther Ouwehand (born 1976 in Katwijk) a politician, parliamentarian for the Party for the Animals

=== Sport ===
- Willem Driebergen (1892 in Katwijk aan Zee – 1965) a Dutch fencer, competed in the individual and team épée events at the 1928 and 1936 Summer Olympics
- Cees de Vreugd, (1952 in Katwijk – 1998) a butcher, strongman and powerlifter
- Jan Siemerink (born 1970 in Rijnsburg) a retired tennis player
- Petra Grimbergen (born 1970 in Rijnsburg) a female road and track racing cyclist, competed at the 1992 Summer Olympics
- Jeffrey Talan (born 1971 in Katwijk) a former professional Dutch international footballer with over 250 club caps
- Marcus van Teijlingen (born 1973 in Rijnsburg) a Dutch dance instructor and professional Latin-American dancer
- Dirk Kuyt (born 1980 in Katwijk) a Dutch former professional footballer with 636 club caps
- Petra Hogewoning (born 1986 in Rijnsburg) a Dutch retired football defender
- Nick Driebergen (born 1987 in Rijnsburg) a Dutch former backstroke swimmer, competed at the 2012 Summer Olympics
- Jaap van Duijn (born 1990 in Katwijk) a Dutch football striker
- Dirk van Duijvenbode (born 1992 in Katwijk aan Zee) a Dutch Professional Darts Corporation player
- Arno Kamminga (born 1995 in Katwijk) a Dutch breaststroke swimmer, competed at the 2020 Summer Olympics

=== Popular culture ===
- The fictional operator 'Iana' from the game Tom Clancy's Rainbow Six Siege is from Katwijk

== Tourist attractions ==
Katwijk is a seaside resort with a wide sandy beach. Its attractiveness is mainly due to its laid-back atmosphere. The boulevard along the shore is not spoiled by large hotels or apartment blocks and has not given in to an excessive commercialisation. Although most buildings lining the boulevard are tourist apartments and pensions, most are just three floors high (and none more than five) and offer a distinctive 'feel' of the 1950s. Besides the beach, there are a few museums in Katwijk, like the old fisherman's museum Katwijks Museum and the Spinoza-museum. A few kilometers inland is the Valkenburg Lake Steam Train, a narrow-gauge railway museum where a scenic steam locomotive driven train ride can be taken around Lake Valkenburg. Katwijk has many hotels and three camping places, mostly situated in the dunes.

== Twin towns ==
Ohrid, North Macedonia	Siegen, Westphalia, Germany

== Image gallery ==
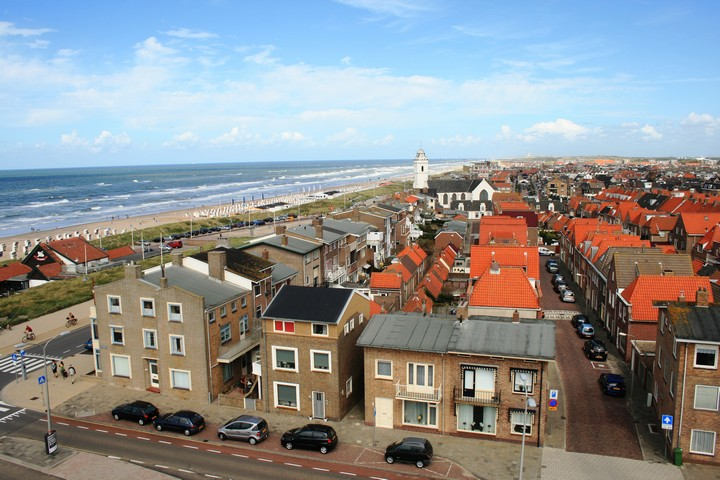
View from the lighthouse

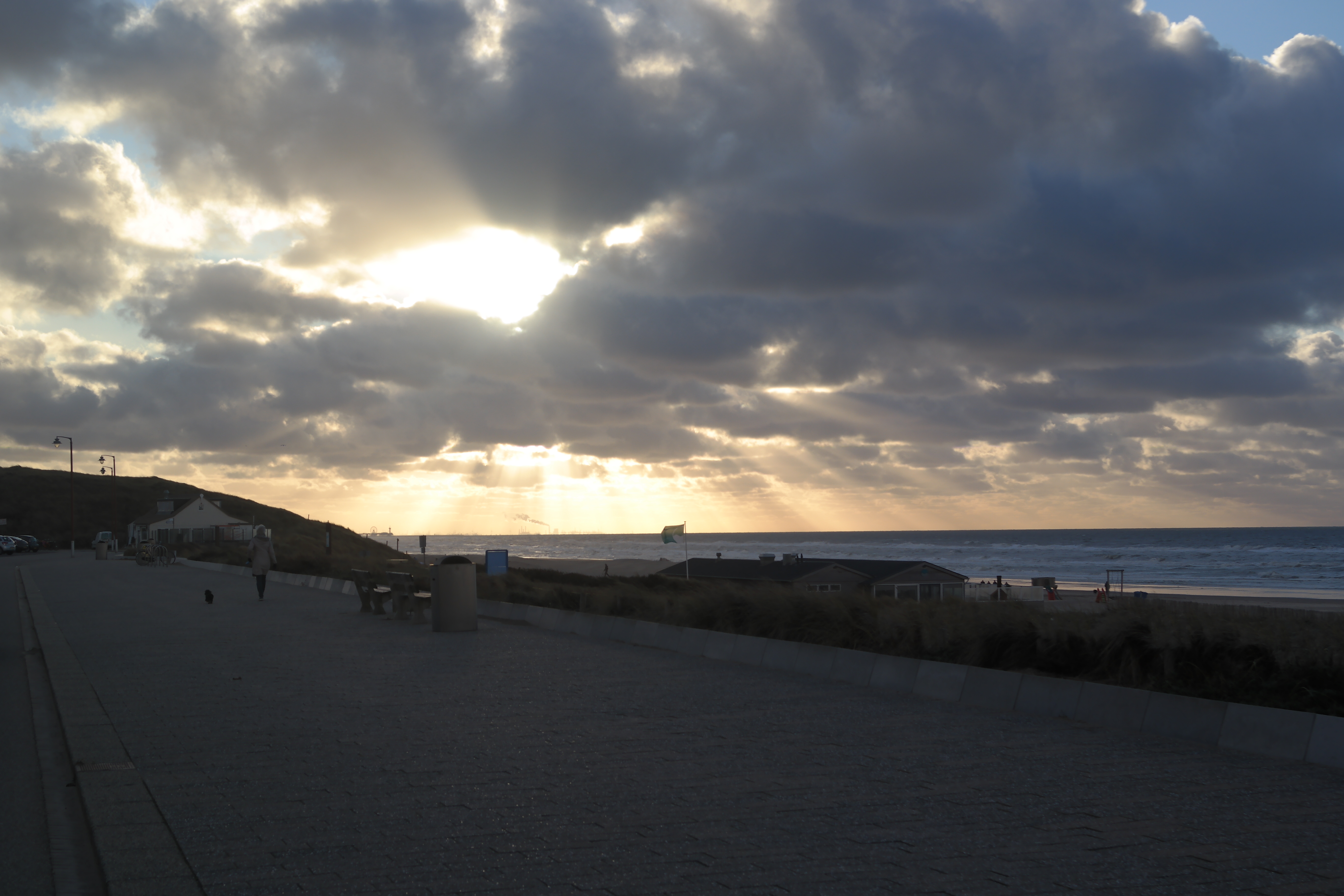
South boulevard

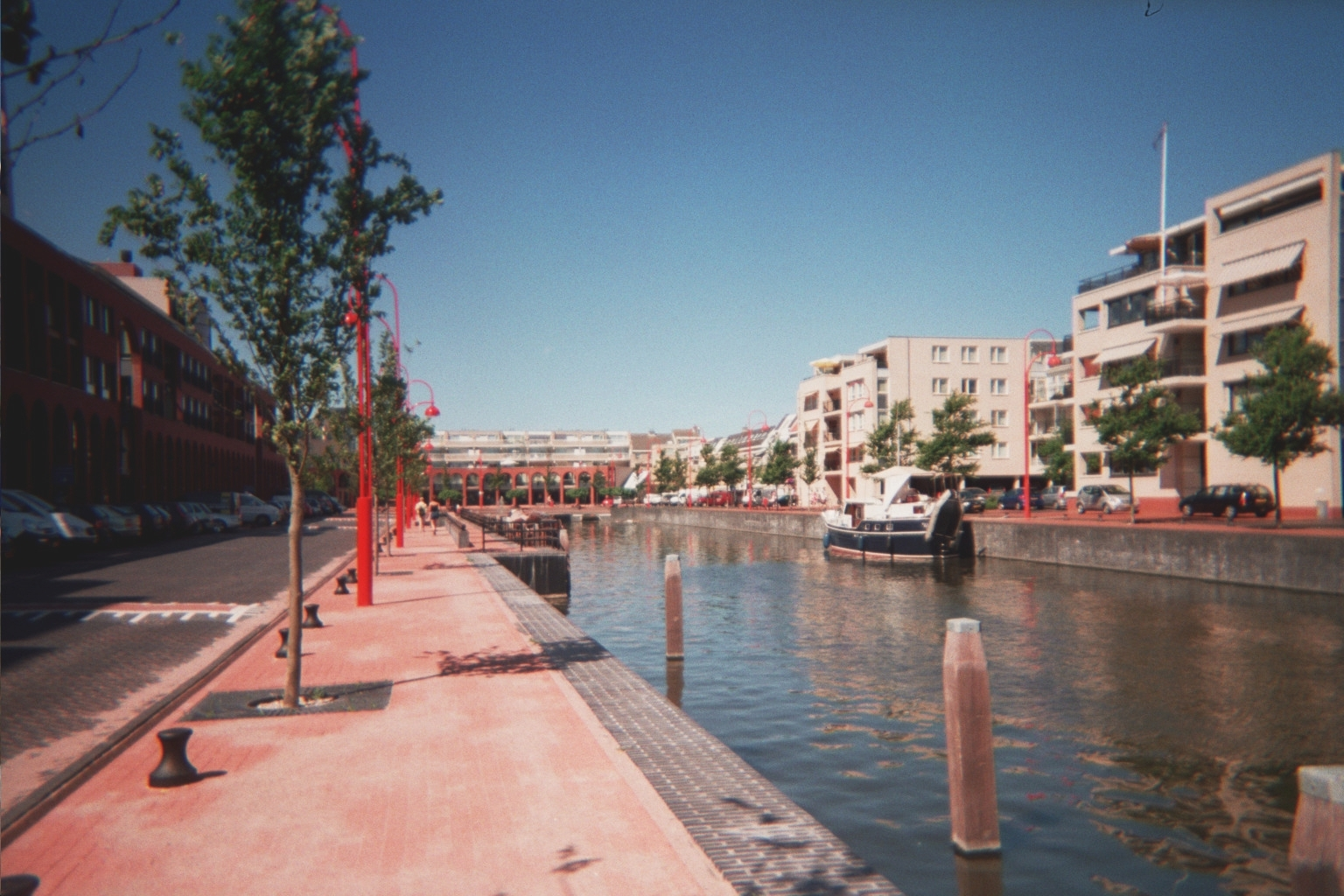
Prins Hendrikkade

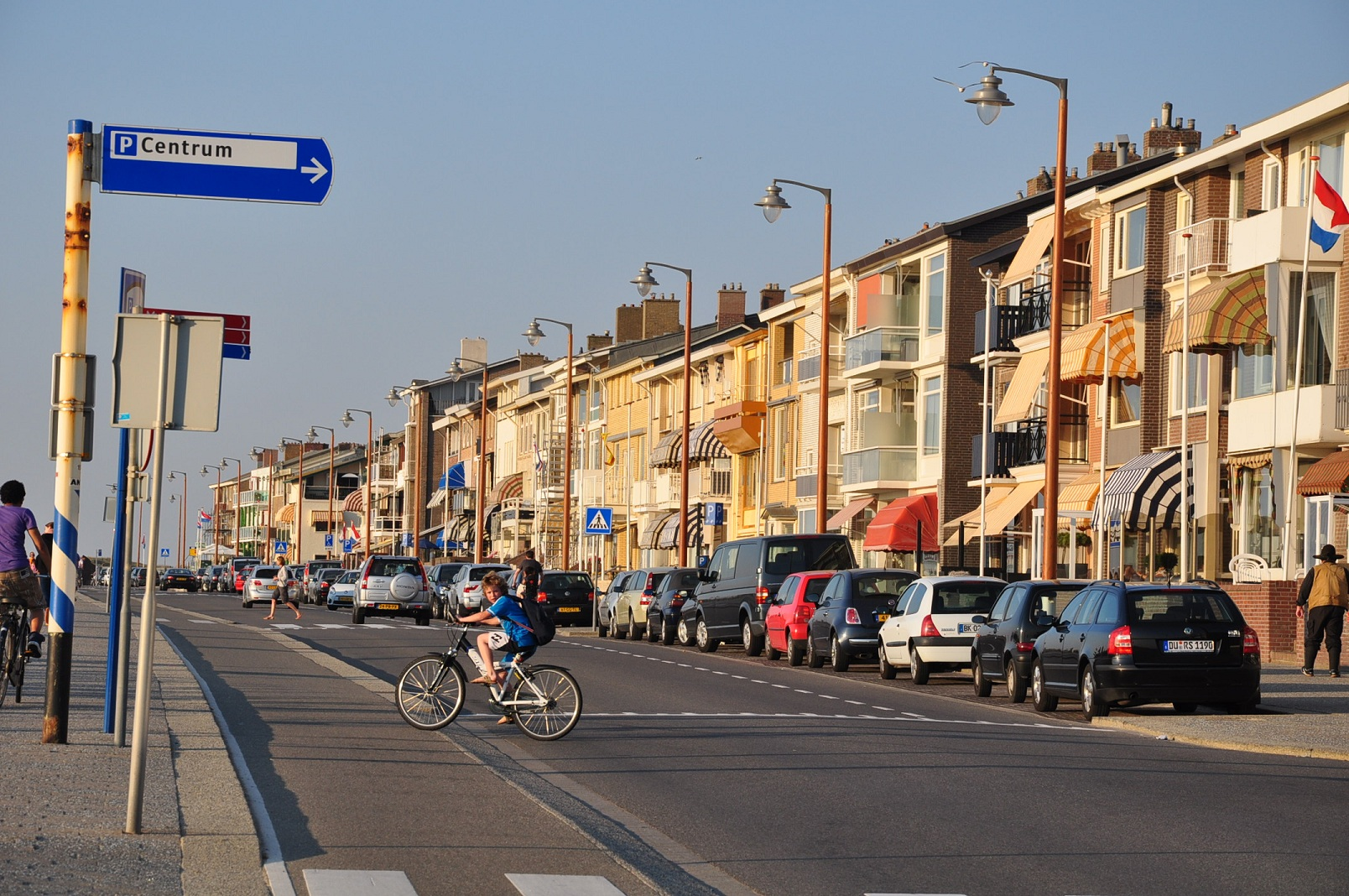
Boulevard near the towncenter.

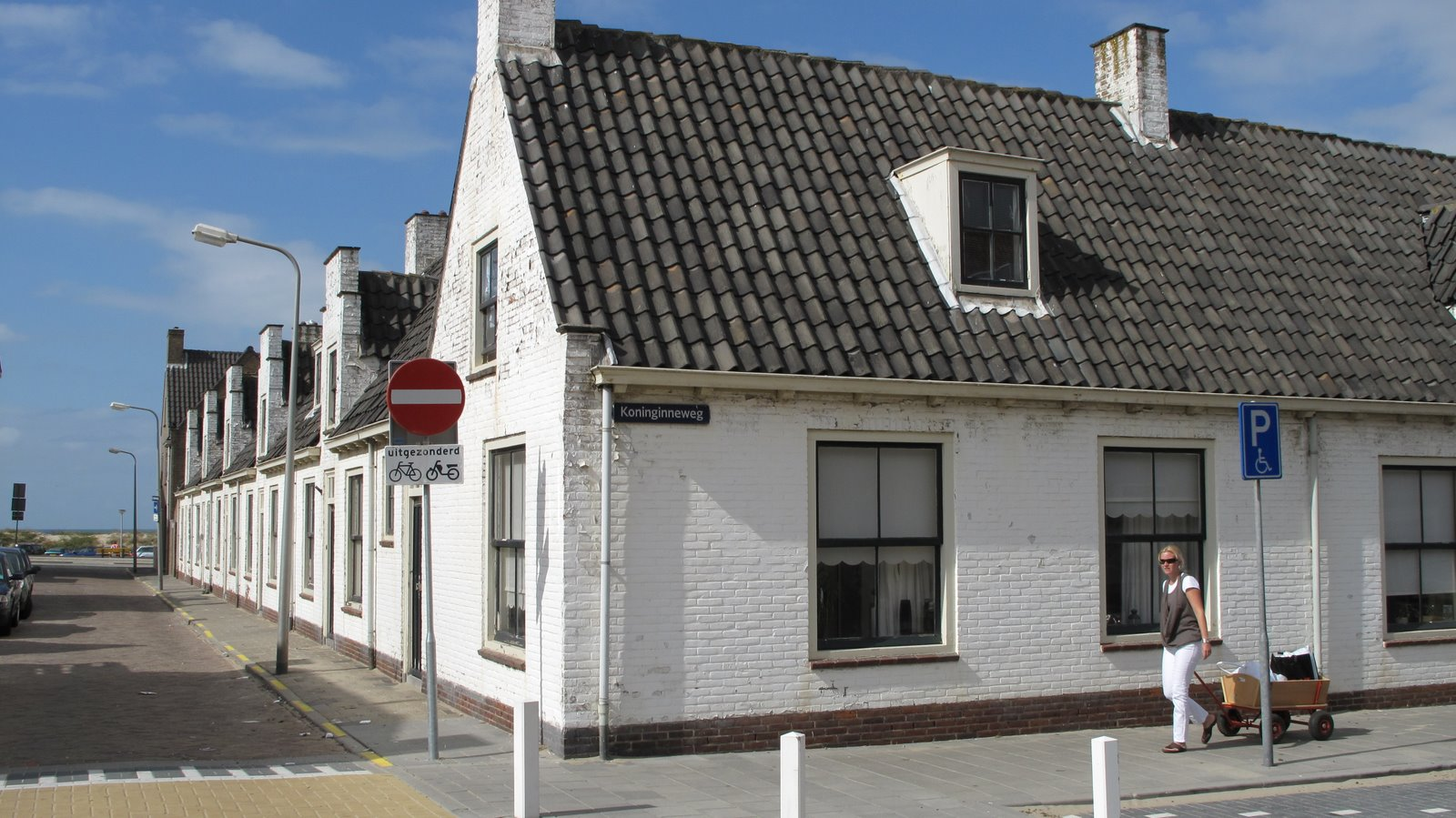
Koninginneweg

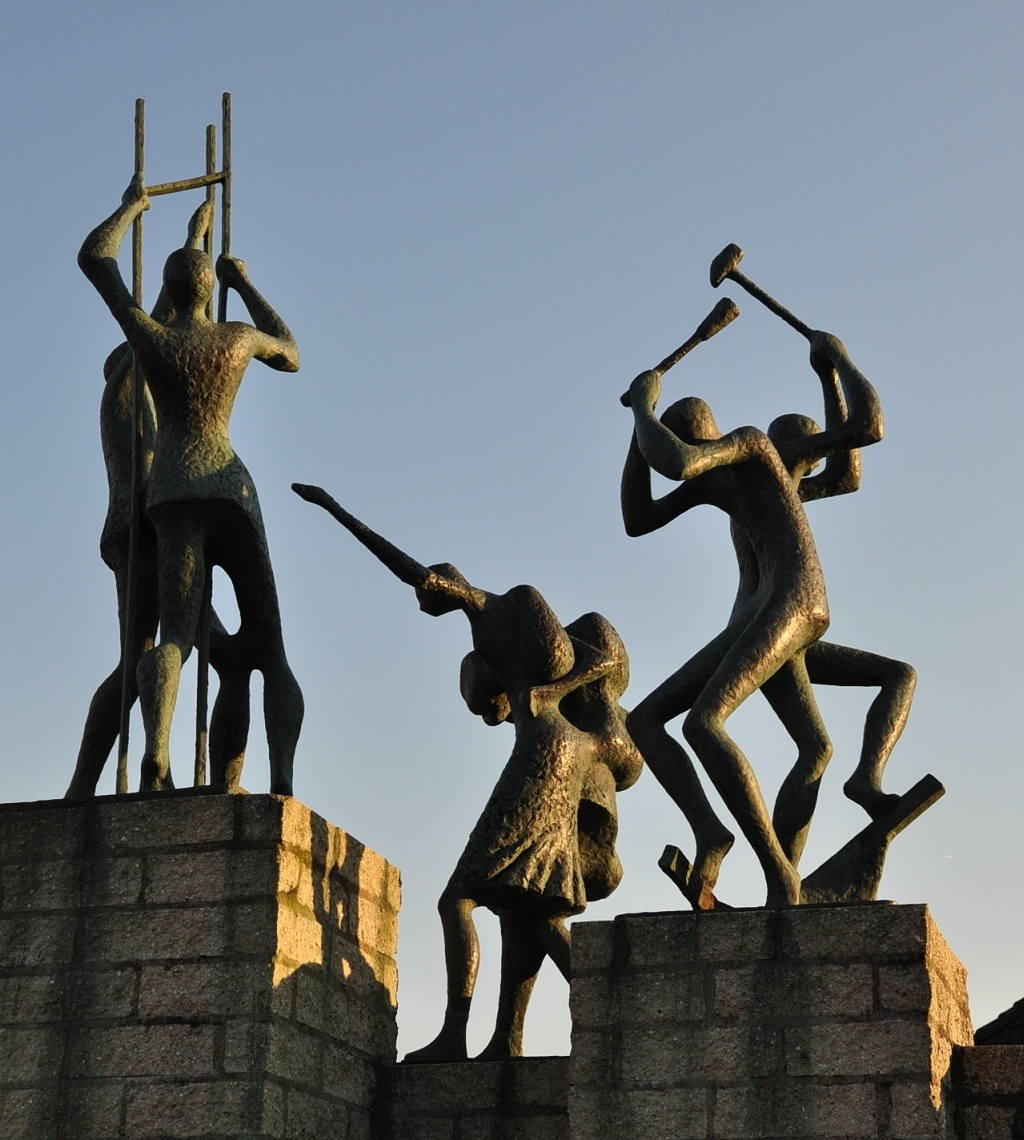
Monument in remembrance of the partial demolition and evacuation of Katwijk during World War II.

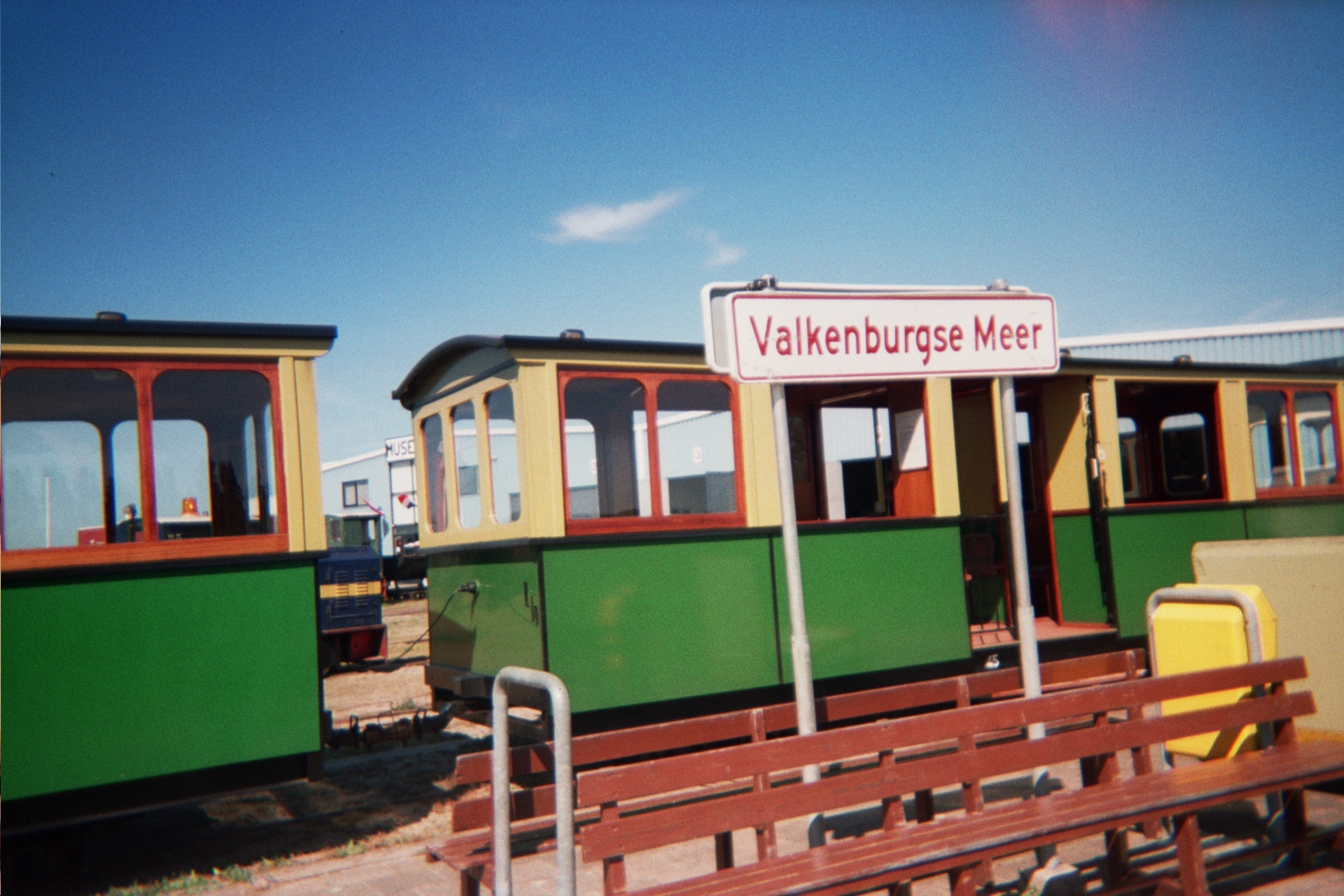
Steam tram at tramstop Valkenburgse Meer, with narrow gauge museum at the background

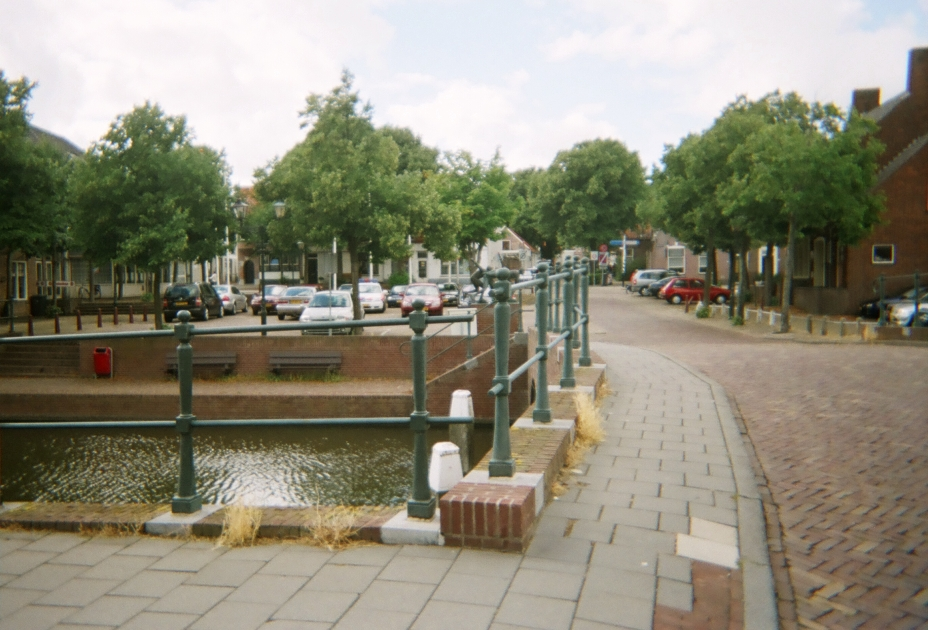
Old Rhine with Turfmarkt square at the background
