= Jaap de Zwaan =

Dutch lawyer and legal scholar

Jaap de Zwaan (born 1949 in Amsterdam) is a Dutch lawyer and legal scholar. Since 1998, he is Professor of the Law of the European Union at the Erasmus University Rotterdam. He was Director of the Netherlands Institute of International Relations Clingendael from 2005 to 2011. From 1979 to 1998, he worked for the Dutch Ministry of Foreign Affairs. He acted as Agent for the Dutch Government in numerous cases before the Court of Justice of the European Communities in Luxembourg. He was involved in the negotiations on and the drafting of several European treaties, such as the Treaties of Accession of Spain and Portugal to the European Communities, the European Single Act and the Treaty of Amsterdam.

He received a law degree from Leiden University in 1972 and attended the College of Europe in Bruges 1972–1973. In 1993 he received a doctorate in law from Groningen University. He was President of the Alumni Association of the College of Europe 1984–1988.
