= Francis de Erdely =

Hungarian-American painter

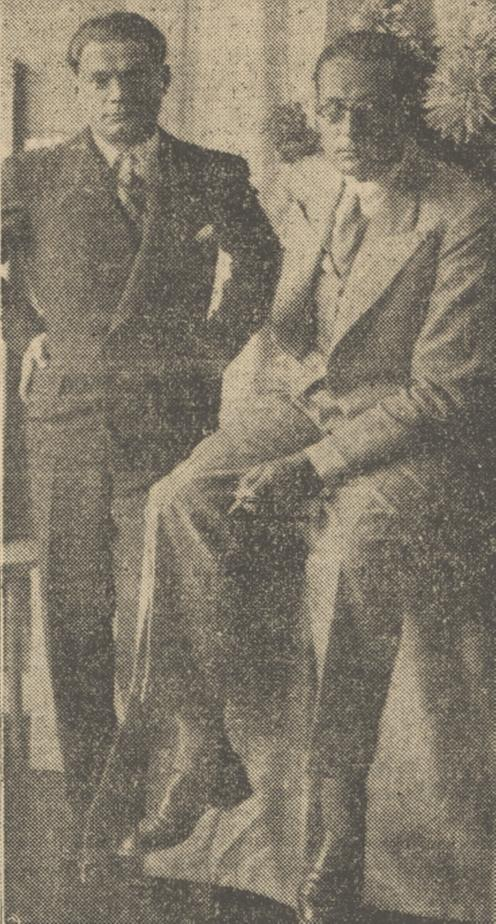
- De Erdely (left) with Dutch artist Christiaan de Moor, 1933
- Born: Ferenc Erdélyi; 3 May 1904; Budapest, Lands of the Crown of Saint Stephen, Austria-Hungary
- Died: 28 November 1959 (aged 55); Los Angeles, California, United States
- Education: Hungarian Royal Drawing School, 1919–1924; Real Academia de Bellas Artes de San Fernando; University of Paris
- Known for: Sculpture; Painting; Drawing
- Movement: Surrealism; Expressionism; Cubism; Modernism

Francis de Erdely (né Ferenc Erdélyi; 1904–1959) was a Hungarian-American artist who was renowned in Europe and the United States for his powerful figure paintings and drawings as well as for his teaching abilities.

== Biography ==
Francis De Erdely was born Ferenc Erdélyi on the 3 May 1904 in Budapest, Austria-Hungary (present-day, Hungary). De Erdely first studied at the Hungarian Royal Drawing School, (1919–1924), as well as the Real Academia de Bellas Artes de San Fernando (Royal Academy of Fine Arts of San Fernando) in Madrid and the prestigious Sorbonne in Paris.

De Erdely's technical abilities, brushwork, and composition were based in European classicism. Politics began to inform his work when Fascism began to gain ground in Europe. As De Erdely's career developed, he became less focused on history painting and the themes of classical Antiquity. Subjects surrounding war, suffering, and human strength became present.

De Erdely immigrated to the United States in 1939. Living in New York and Chicago initially, he was hired to paint portrait of wealthy patrons. He also painted images of the American Scene. It was after his move to Los Angeles, when his mature work developed and he established himself as an American artist.

He is best known for his figure-based paintings done in Los Angeles during the 1940s and 1950s of immigrants, laborers, dancers, and social outsiders. It has been argued that this period of his work relate directly to De Erdely's own experience as an immigrant in a new country.

== Collections ==
- Brussels Moderne, Brussels, Belgium
- Royal Museum of Fine Arts Antwerp, Antwerp, Belgium
- Butler Institute of American Art, Youngstown, Ohio, United States
- Colorado Springs Fine Arts, Colorado Springs, Colorado, United States
- Corcoran Gallery of Art, Washington, D.C., United States
- De Young Memorial Museum, San Francisco, California, United States
- Denver Art Museum, Denver, Colorado, United States
- Detroit Institute of Arts, Detroit, Michigan, United States
- Fine Arts Museums of San Francisco, California, United States
- Los Angeles County Museum of Art, Los Angeles, California, United States
- Metropolitan Museum of Art, New York, New York, United States
- National Gallery of Victoria, Melbourne, Victoria, Australia
- Nora Eccles Harrison Museum of Art, Utah State University, Utah, United States
- Oakland Museum of Art, Oakland, California, United States
- Pasadena Art Institute, Pasadena, California, United States
- Pennsylvania Academy of the Fine Arts, Philadelphia, Pennsylvania, United States
- Seattle Museum of Art, Seattle, Washington, United States
- Springville Museum of Art, Springville, Utah, United States
- USC Fisher Gallery, California, United States
- Vychodoslovenska Galeria, Kosice, Slovak republic (permanent exhibition)
- Laguna Art Museum, Laguna, California, United States
- Huntington Library, San Marino, United States

== Exhibitions ==
- 1925: Budapest, Hungary
- 1939: Hungarian Relief Library, New York, New York, United States
- 1940–1944: Detroit Institute of Arts, Detroit, Michigan, United States
- 1940: De Young Memorial Museum, San Francisco, California, United States
- 1940: Santa Barbara Museum of Art, Santa Barbara, California, United States
- 1941: Pennsylvania Academy of the Fine Arts, Philadelphia, Pennsylvania, United States
- 1942: Vancouver Museum of Fine Art
- 1942–1945: Art Institute of Chicago, Chicago, Illinois, United States
- 1942–1943: The Scarab Club, Detroit, Michigan, United States
- 1943: Corcoran Gallery of Art, Washington, D.C., United States
- 1943–1944: De Young Memorial Museum, San Francisco, California, United States
- 1945–1946: Denver Art Museum, Denver, Colorado, United States
- 1945–1946: San Francisco Fine Arts Association, California, United States
- 1946: Pasadena School of Arts, Pasadena, California, United States
- 1946: Nelson-Atkins Museum of Art, Kansas City, Missouri, United States
- 1950: Laguna Beach Art Gallery, Laguna Beach, California, United States
- 1950: Crocker, Sacramento, California, United States
- 1950: Haggin Museum, Stockton, California, United States
- 1950: Oakland Art Museum, Oakland, California, United States
- 1959–1960: Pasadena Art Museum, Pasadena, California, United States
- 1960: Seattle Art Museum, Seattle, Washington, United States
- 1960: Los Angeles County Museum of Art, Los Angeles, California, United States
- 2022: Laguna Art Museum, Laguna Beach, California, United States

== Awards ==
- 1925 – Szinyei-Merse Grand Prize, Budapest, Hungary
- 1929 – Triennial Bronze Medal, Ghent, Belgium
- 1940–1944 – Detroit Art Institute (prizes)
- 1942 – Scarab Club, Detroit, Michigan (medal)
- 1943 – Scarab Club, Detroit, Michigan (medal)
- 1946 – Scarab Club, Detroit, Michigan (prize)
- 1946 – Pasadena School of Arts (prize)
- 1947–1951 – Oakland Art Gallery (prizes)
- 1949 – Arizona State Fair (award)
- 1954 – Audubon Association (medal)
