= Roel Wiersma =

Dutch footballer (1932–1995)

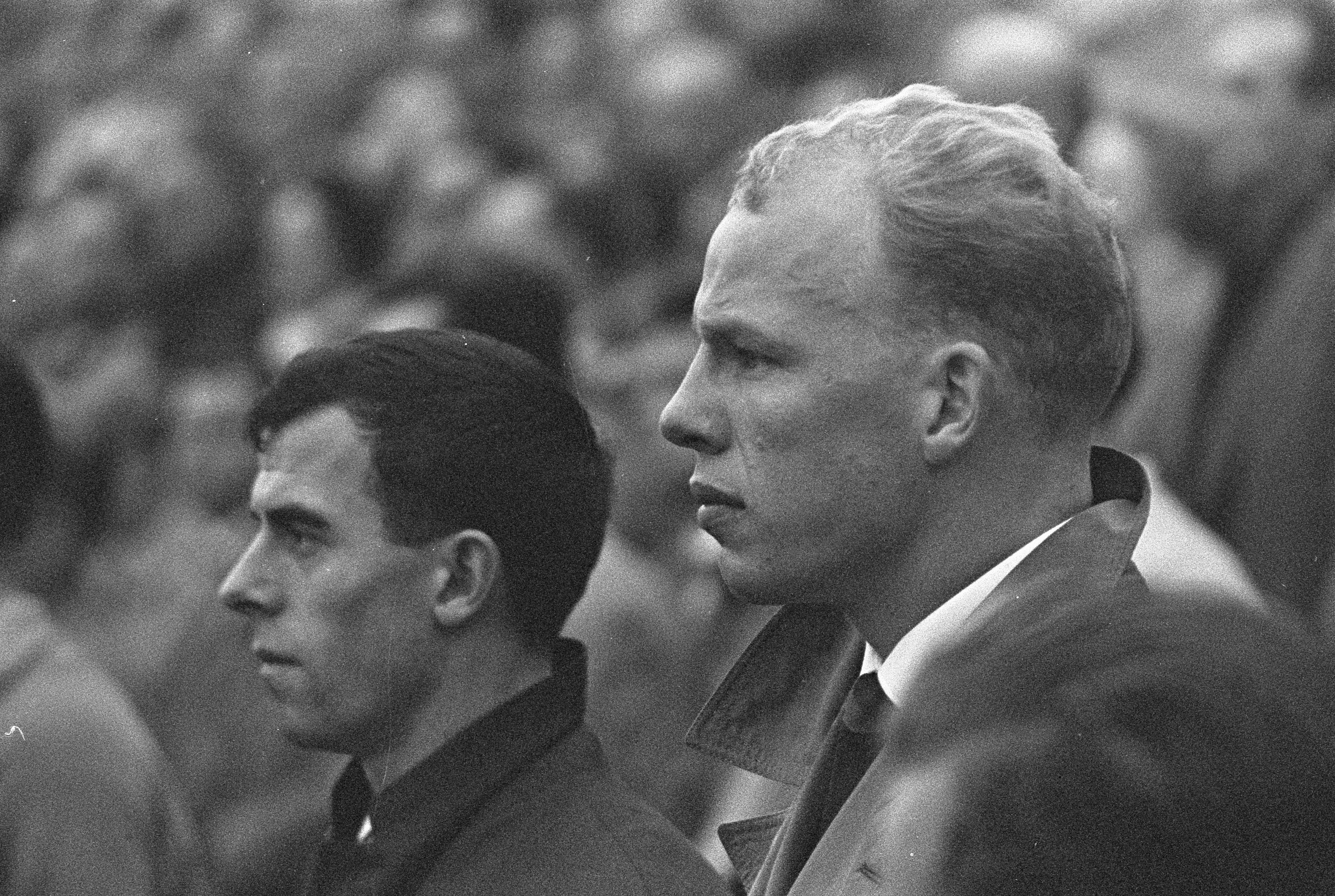
- Roel Wiersma (right) with Coen Moulijn (left) in 1959.

Personal information
- Date of birth: April 15, 1932
- Place of birth: Hilversum, Netherlands
- Date of death: February 4, 1995 (aged 62)
- Height: 1.78 m (5 ft 10 in)
- Position: Right back

Youth career
- 1940–1949: Donar

Senior career*
Years	Team	Apps	(Gls)
1954–1965	PSV	316	(2)
1965–1966	EVV	4	(0)

International career
1954–1962	Netherlands	53	(0)
- * Club domestic league appearances and goals

Roel Wiersma (Dutch pronunciation: [rul ˈʋiːrsmaː]; 15 April 1932 – 4 February 1995) was a Dutch footballer, who most notably played for PSV Eindhoven and the Netherlands national team.

Wiersma was born in Hilversum and played for amateur side Donar until 1954, when he was signed by PSV Eindhoven. He played at the club for ten seasons, making 316 league appearances. Wiersma served as captain for many years; most notably in 1963 when his team won the Eredivisie title. Between 1954 and 1962, he also played 53 caps for the Netherlands national team. In fifteen of his appearances, Wiersma served as captain of the Dutch squad. After a short period at EVV, he retired and committed himself to coaching and policy positions.

== Early life ==
Wiersma was born in Hilversum in 1932, after his parents had decided to move there from Amsterdam five years earlier. Wiersma is a Frisian name; his paternal grandfather was born in Harlingen. At age 8, he joined the sports club Donar in his home town. Besides football, Wiersma played a range of different sports at Donar, including baseball, basketball and table tennis.

== Club career ==
In 1949, Wiersma debuted for the Donar first team, which played in the Dutch Fourth Division at the time. In his first season, the club was immediately promoted to the Third Division. Wiersma played for Donar until the 1954-55 season, when the team again won promotion; this time to the Second Division. His games at Donar were combined with his performances on the national Air Force football team (as part of his conscription). For Wiersma’s military service, he was stationed in Eindhoven as a sports instructor sergeant. He arranged a match for the Air Force team against an English military team. After Heerenveen’s Imke de Jong was outplayed by his English counterpart, Wiersma decided to substitute De Jong and bring himself onto the field. During his service, Wiersma trained several times at PSV Eindhoven and his performances at Donar and the Air Force football team meant that PSV decided to sign him in 1954.

From the 1950s onwards, PSV conducted a shift in player’s heritage; the team went from mostly Brabantian men to players nationwide. Part of this policy was Wiersma’s transfer, who moved for a fee of 3000 Guilders (although PSV eventually only paid 2500 Guilders to Donar). Every player who signed for PSV, would also work for Philips, as was customary at the time. His father and siblings already worked for the Nederlandsche Seintoestellen Fabriek (NSF), which was partially owned by Philips. Consequently, Wiersma started to work at the NSF as well. Throughout his career, Wiersma faced a few problems with PSV: the club promised to financially support his engineering education, but failed to do so until he threatened to move to Feyenoord. And when Wiersma left PSV, he did not receive the conventional 3000 Guilders bonus that every player got. Still, Wiersma remained at PSV for ten years and was captain of the 1963 squad that won the Eredivisie, his first and only trophy. He was present at PSV's first match in the European Cup in September 1955, when they faced Rapid Wien (and lost 6-2 on aggregate). More successful was PSV's 1963-64 European Cup campaign, when they reached the quarterfinals. Wiersma played in all six matches that season.

After PSV appointed Bram Appel as the new coach, he announced a new focus on younger players and notified Wiersma that he was not needed anymore. Disappointed, Wiersma left for rivals EVV in 1965 on a free transfer. In total, he played 316 league matches and scored twice for PSV. Wiersma also appeared in 14 cup matches and eight European matches. His career at EVV was cut short through injury: in a game against Budel, he broke his tibia, forcing him to end his career.

== International career ==
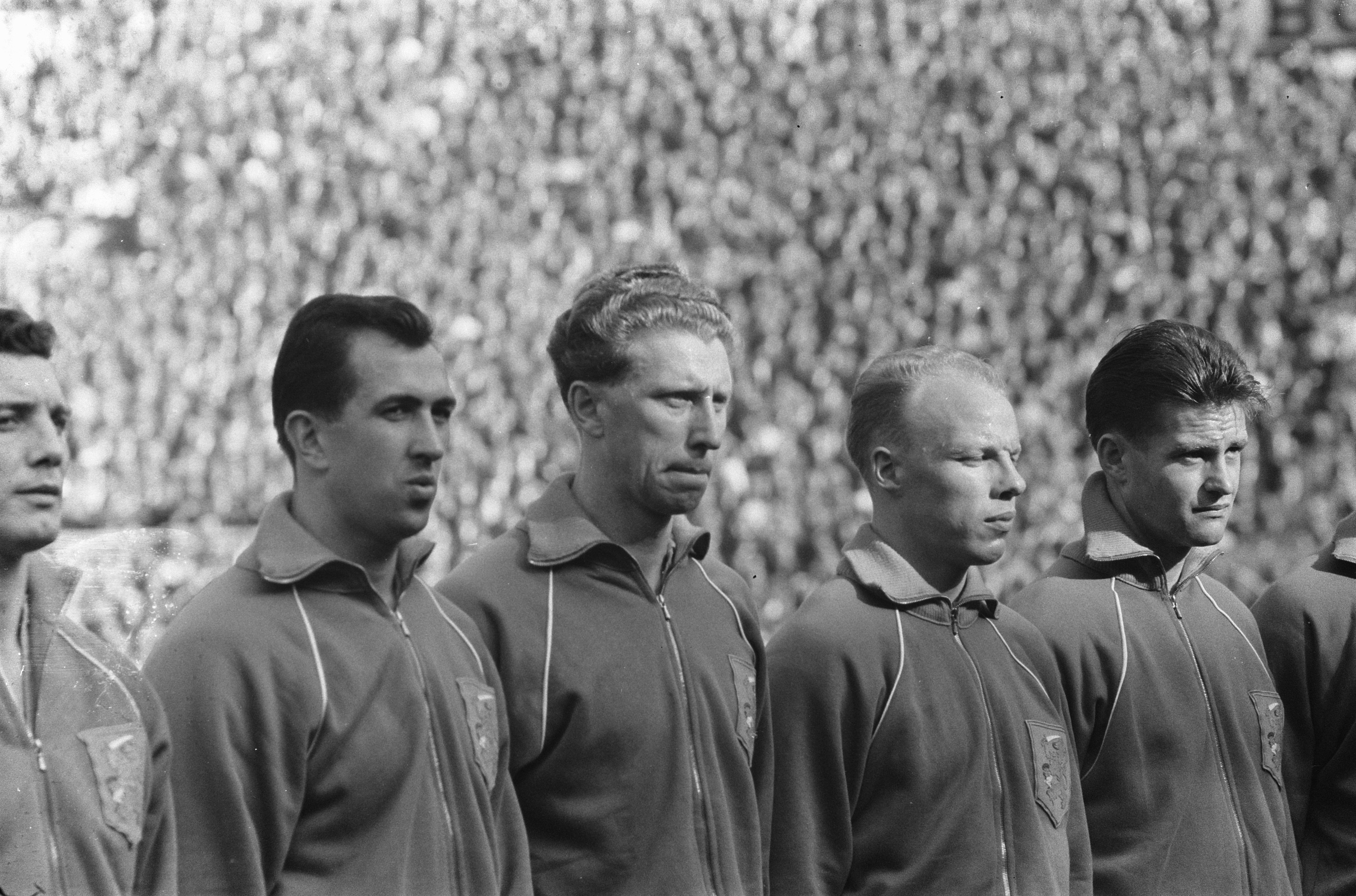
The Netherlands squad lining up before a match against Belgium in 1960. From left to right: Cor van der Hart, Eddy Pieters Graafland, Jan Klaassens, Wiersma and Kees Kuijs.

While still playing for Donar in the third tier of the Dutch league system, Wiersma debuted in the Netherlands national team. On 24 October 1954, he appeared in an exhibition match against Belgium. Since his first cap, Wiersma set a 35-match streak for not missing a single Netherlands match. This series of matches in a row (starting from the player’s first cap) is a Dutch record until this day. In the match that Wiersma missed and thus ended his record, the Netherlands lost to West Germany 0-7. He mostly appeared in friendly matches; Wiersma played four 1958 FIFA World Cup qualification matches and three 1962 FIFA World Cup qualification matches. Wiersma's most notorious qualification match was an away fixture against Austria. The Dutch team lost 3-2 and Wiersma was stretchered off the field: after a hard tackle by Robert Dienst, he landed on the running track and ended up with a bloody face and a concussion. In 15 of his matches, Wiersma served as captain of the Dutch side. His national team career ended after a row with coach Elek Schwartz, who benched Wiersma after a 4-1 loss against Denmark in 1962. Schwartz blamed Wiersma’s bad performance on a disproportionate attention to his engineering study; Wiersma simply condemned his teammates’ mentality. The Denmark match later turned out to be his last for The Netherlands.

== Style of play ==
Wiersma was a right-footed right wing back. He was known to be a powerful, physical defender with great stamina. Wiersma usually played a rough but fair game. He was lacking in technical abilities, but he was strong in the air. Wiersma commented about his own game in 1962: “I am a player with very average technical skills. I could only manage so many years at this level because of my combativeness and because apparently, there are no better defenders around.”

== Post-career ==
After his retirement, Wiersma remained involved in sports. He became coach for the PSV waterpolo team and also coached amateur football sides TOP Oss and ASV ‘33. In the 1976-77 season, he coached another amateur side, VV Oirschot Vooruit. In 1961 he was one of the founders of the Vereniging van Contractspelers (VVCS), a union for professional football players. Wiersma started out as vice-chairman and between 1967 and 1975 he served as the chairman of the VVCS. Starting from 1979, Wiersma was also a board member for technical affairs at the KNVB. After he quit his position as board member, he also served in several commissions at the KNVB. He also worked as analyst for Dutch newspaper De Telegraaf. On 4 February 1995, Wiersma died of a heart failure during a game of tennis.

== Awards and honours ==
=== Club ===
PSV Eindhoven

- Eredivisie (1): 1962-63

== Career statistics ==
=== International ===
National team	Season	Apps	Goals
Netherlands	1954	1	0
Netherlands	1955	7	0
Netherlands	1956	7	0
Netherlands	1957	8	0
Netherlands	1958	7	0
Netherlands	1959	6	0
Netherlands	1960	7	0
Netherlands	1961	6	0
Netherlands	1962	4	0
Total		53	0
