= Jaap Weideman =

Rear Admiral Jacob A.C. Weideman SM MMM
- Born: 8 March 1936
- Died: 1996 (aged 59–60); Cape Town
- Spouse: Marie Johanna de Villiers
- Military career
- Allegiance: South Africa
- Branch: South African Navy
- Service years: 1954–198?
- Rank: Rear Admiral
- Nickname: Jaap
- Commands: Inspector General (Navy); SAS Maria van Riebeeck; SAS Mosselbaai
- Awards: Southern Cross Medal SM Military Merit Medal MMM Pro Patria Medal General Service Medal (South Africa) Good Service Medal Permanent Force Good Service Medal

Rear Admiral Jacob Andries Cornelius 'Jaap' Weideman SM MMM (1936–1996) was a South African Navy officer.

He joined the Navy in 1954 and in 1955 attended the South African Military Academy.

In 1968 he commanded SAS Mosselbaai.

In 1970 he became the first South African to qualify as a submariner and became the first Officer Commanding of SAS Maria van Riebeeck.

In 1982 he was appointed as Inspector General (Navy).

== Awards and decorations ==
- Southern Cross Medal (1952) (SM)
- Military Merit Medal (MMM)
- Pro Patria Medal
- General Service Medal (South Africa)
- Good Service Medal (Gold (30 Years))
- Good Service Medal (Silver (20 Years))
- Permanent Force Good Service Medal

== See also ==
- List of South African military chiefs

Military offices
Preceded by Cdre Roy Kingon	IG South African Navy; 1982–1985	Succeeded by Cdre Trevor Beddy
