= Jaap Davids =

Dutch footballer

Personal information
- Date of birth: December 1, 1984 (age 41)
- Place of birth: Bergharen, Netherlands
- Position: Defender

Senior career*
Years	Team	Apps	(Gls)
2003–2008	Vitesse	0	(0)
2005–2006	→ FC Den Bosch (loan)	34	(5)
2006–2007	→ AGOVV (loan)	3	(0)
- * Club domestic league appearances and goals

Jaap Davids (born 1 December 1984 in Bergharen, Gelderland) is a Dutch retired footballer.

== Club career ==
His first club was Vitesse in the 2003–04 and 2004–05 season, but made no appearances for the club. He was loaned out to FC Den Bosch in 2005, where he made 34 appearances and 5 goals. The next season Davids was loaned out to AGOVV Apeldoorn making three appearances and where he was suspended for a few months due to ill-discipline.

He was finally released by Vitesse and joined amateur side De Treffers.

In 2009 he moved to FC Lienden, only to leave them after two seasons for RKHVV.

== Statistics ==
Season	Club	Country	Appearances	Caps	Goals
2003/04	SBV Vitesse	Netherlands	Eredivisie	0	0
2004/05	SBV Vitesse	Netherlands	Eredivisie	0	0
2005/06	FC Den Bosch	Netherlands	Eerste Divisie	34	5
2006/07	AGOVV Apeldoorn	Netherlands	Eerste Divisie	3	0
Total:				37	5
