= Ruud Hesp =

Dutch footballer (born 1965)

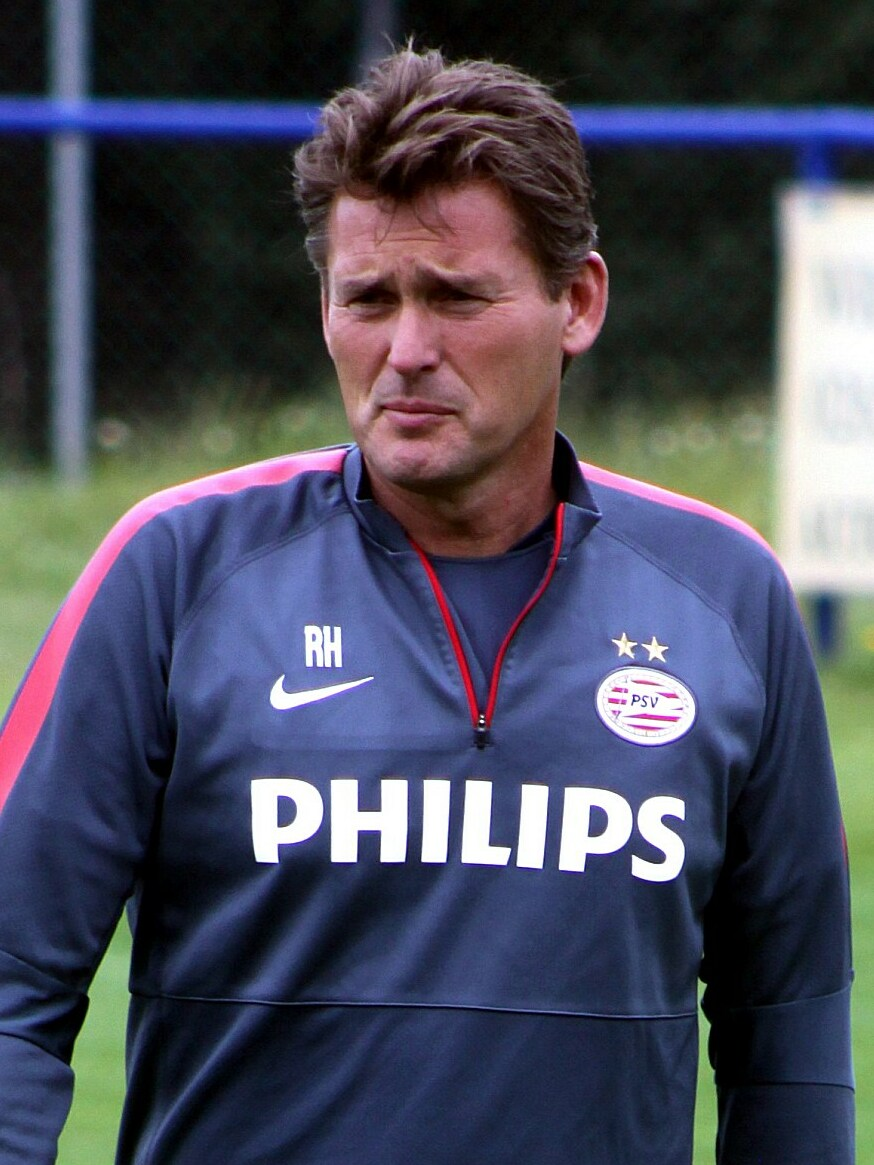
- Hesp with PSV in 2014

Personal information
- Full name: Rudolfus Hubertus Hesp
- Date of birth: 31 October 1965 (age 61)
- Place of birth: Bussum, Netherlands
- Height: 1.94 m (6 ft 4 in)
- Position: Goalkeeper

Youth career
- 1971-1981: Abcoude

Senior career*
Years	Team	Apps	(Gls)
1981–1983	Abcoude		
1983–1987	Haarlem	2	(0)
1987–1994	Fortuna Sittard	238	(0)
1994–1997	Roda JC	102	(0)
1997–2000	Barcelona	100	(0)
2000–2002	Fortuna Sittard	62	(0)
Total		504	(0)

International career
1984	Netherlands U19	2	(0)

Managerial career
- 2002–2007: Roda JC (goalkeeping coach)
- 2006–2012: Netherlands (goalkeeping coach)
- 2007–2013: Groningen (goalkeeping coach)
- 2013–2020: PSV (goalkeeping coach)
- 2021–2024: Heerenveen (goalkeeping coach)
- 2024–: Beşiktaş (goalkeeping coach)
- * Club domestic league appearances and goals

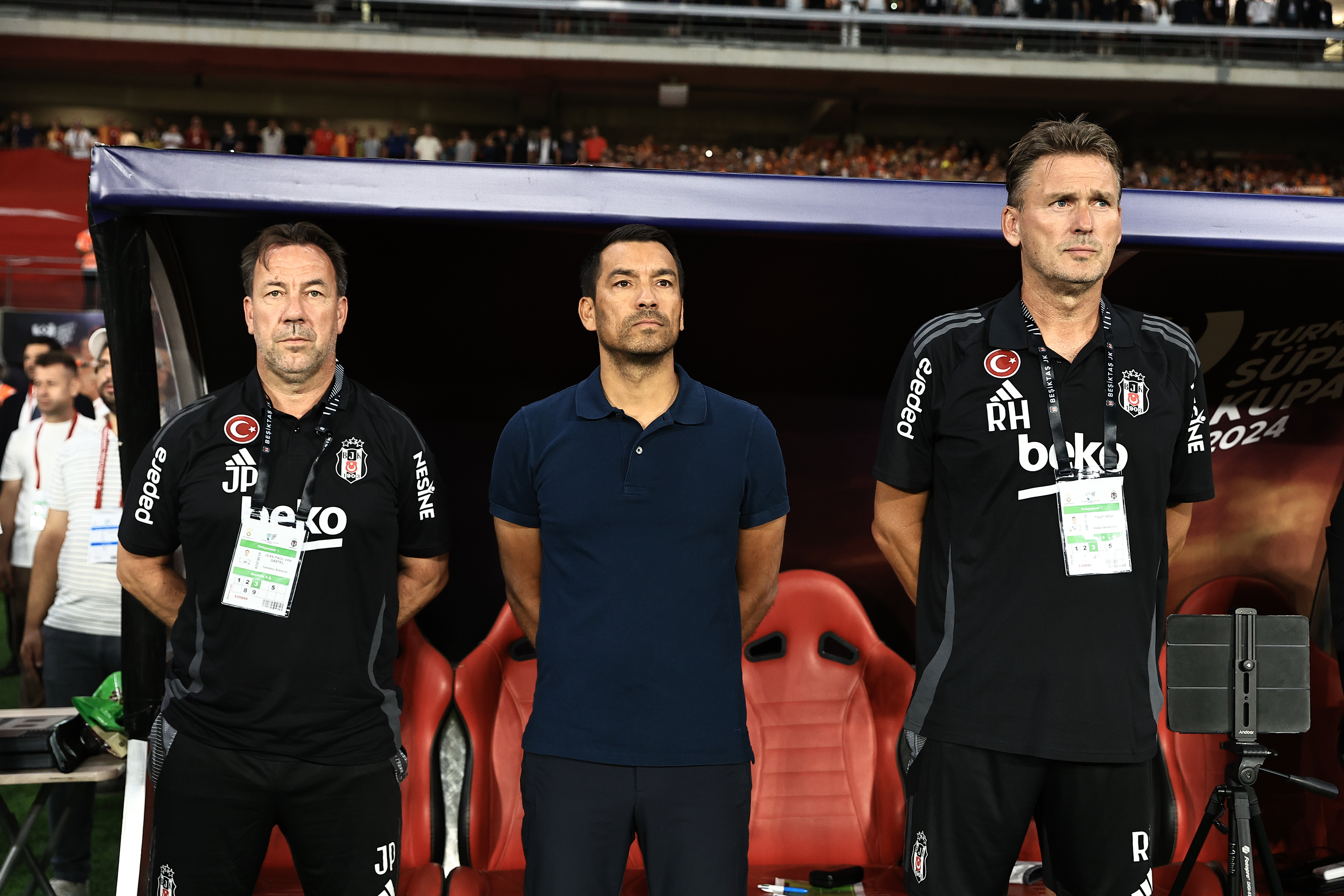
Jean-Paul van Gastel, Giovanni van Bronckhorst and Ruud Hesp in the 2024 Turkish Super Cup

Rudolfus Hubertus "Ruud" Hesp (Dutch pronunciation: [ryt ˈɦɛsp]; born 31 October 1965) is a Dutch retired footballer who played as a goalkeeper.

== Club career ==
Born in Bussum, North Holland and raised in Abcoude, Hesp started his professional career in the 1985–86 season at Haarlem. He was recommended to Haarlem by Piet Schrijvers, who had coached him at FC Abcoude. Despite rarely playing in his two years for Haarlem, he moved along with coach Hans van Doorneveld to another club in the Eredivisie, Fortuna Sittard, where he would remain the following seven years; during his first ten professional campaigns (one with Fortuna was spent in the second division), he did not miss a single game.

After three seasons with Roda, Hesp signed with Spanish side Barcelona as the Catalans were being managed by countryman Louis van Gaal, also newly signed. Van Gaal resorted to Hesp after he was able to sign neither Edwin van der Sar, who stayed at Ajax, nor Ed de Goey, who signed for Chelsea. He easily beat competition from Portuguese Vítor Baía, playing in 73 out of 76 possible La Liga matches as Barça won back-to-back leagues (in 1998, the double befell).

In his last season at the Camp Nou, Hesp split first-choice status with youth graduate Francesc Arnau, then moved back to the Netherlands and Fortuna, retiring at almost 37 in 2002. Subsequently, he joined Groningen as a goalkeeper coach.

In the summer of 2013, Hesp left Groningen for PSV Eindhoven in the same capacity.

On 27 June 2024, he moved to the Turkish side Beşiktaş, where he joined the staff of coach Giovanni van Bronckhorst.

== International career ==
Although Hesp was picked by the Netherlands for their UEFA Euro 1996 and 1998 FIFA World Cup squads, he never actually won a cap for the national team, acting as understudy to both first-choice Edwin van der Sar and his substitute Ed de Goey. He also worked with the side as a goalkeeper coach. He did play twice for the U19s.

== Personal life ==
Hesp's younger brother, Danny, was also a professional footballer. A defender, the pair shared teams in 1994–95 at Roda.

== Honours ==
Roda JC

- KNVB Cup: 1996–97

Barcelona

- La Liga: 1997–98, 1998–99
- Copa del Rey: 1997–98
- UEFA Super Cup: 1997
