= Christy Bonevacia =

Curaçao footballer

Personal information
- Full name: Christy Bonevacia
- Date of birth: December 25, 1985 (age 40)
- Place of birth: Willemstad, Curaçao, Netherlands Antilles
- Position: Midfielder

Team information
- Current team: VVA '71

Youth career
- AZ

Senior career*
Years	Team	Apps	(Gls)
2003–2005	AZ	1	(0)
2005–2007	FC Emmen	80	(0)
2008	HFC Haarlem	13	(0)
2008–2011	SV Spakenburg	16	(0)
2011–2012	Zwaluwen '30		(0)
2012–	VVA '71		

International career
2011–	Curaçao	6	(0)
- * Club domestic league appearances and goals

Christy Bonevacia (born 25 December 1985 in Willemstad, Curaçao in the former Netherlands Antilles) is a Curaçao footballer who currently plays for Dutch amateur side VVA '71.

== Club career ==
Bonevacia came through the youth ranks at AZ and in 2005, he played for AZ in the UEFA Cup semi-final against Sporting Portugal. He then played for Eerste Divisie sides Emmen and Haarlem before moving to Spakenburg.

== Personal life ==
He works for a security company.
