= Danny Hesp =

Dutch former professional footballer (born 1969)

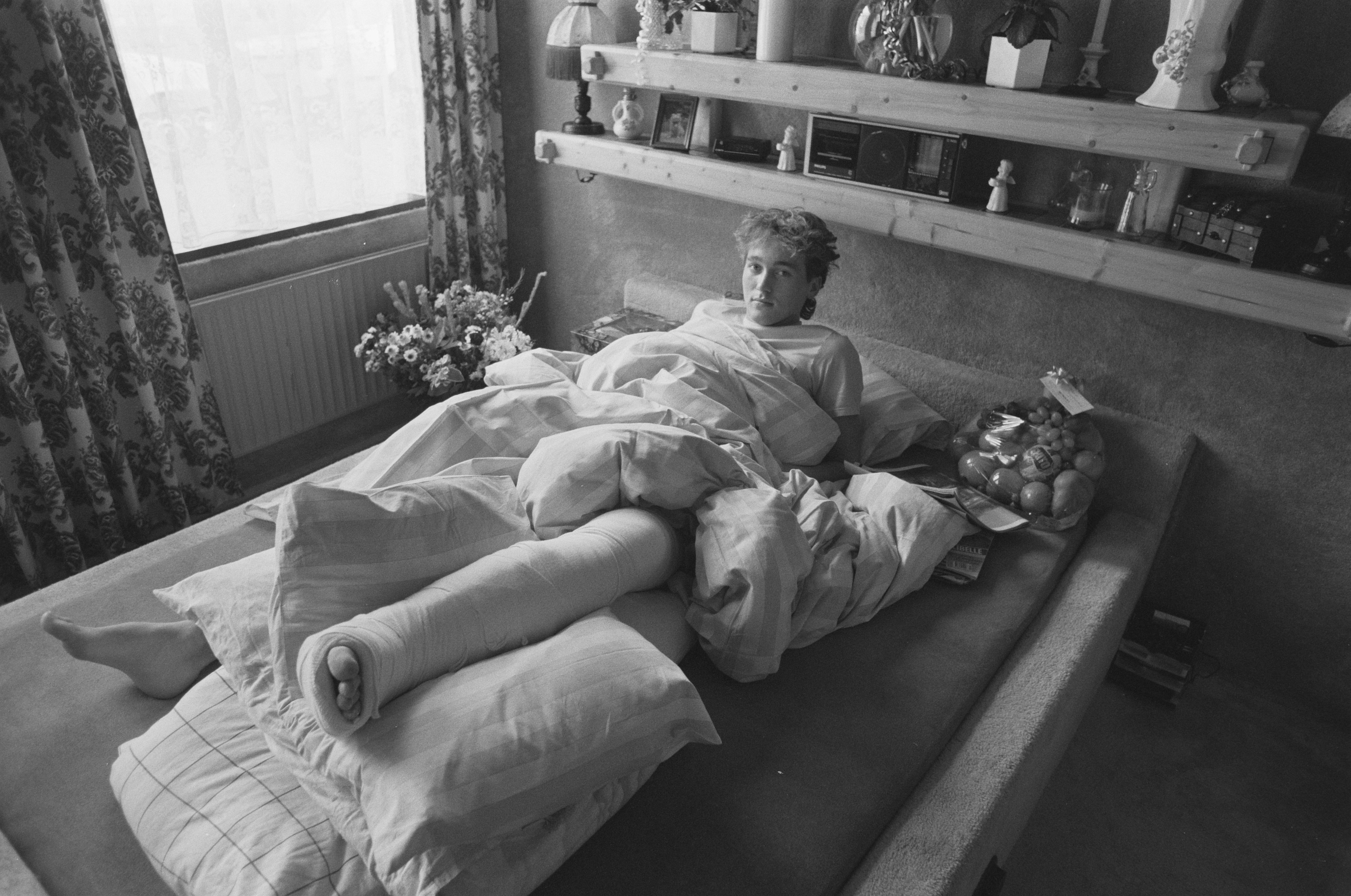
- Danny Hesp at home with a broken leg, 1988

Personal information
- Full name: Danny Petrus Hesp
- Date of birth: 19 October 1969 (age 57)
- Place of birth: Amsterdam, Netherlands
- Height: 1.82 m (5 ft 11 1/2 in)
- Position: Defender

Youth career
- FC Abcoude

Senior career*
Years	Team	Apps	(Gls)
1987–1990	Ajax	9	(0)
1990–1992	Heerenveen	38	(1)
1992–1995	TOP Oss	92	(10)
1995–1996	Roda JC	30	(3)
1996–1997	AZ	39	(3)
1997–2003	NEC	167	(19)
2003–2005	RBC	62	(3)
Total		437	(39)

International career
1987–1988	Netherlands U19	4	(1)
- * Club domestic league appearances and goals

Danny Petrus Hesp (born 19 October 1969) is a Dutch retired footballer who played as a defender.

== Playing career ==
Born in Amsterdam but raised in Abcoude, Hesp started professionally at Ajax, but only appeared in nine Eredivisie games in three seasons combined, all in his first. A very promising player, he broke his leg after a sliding tackle by FC Den Bosch defender Fred van der Hoorn in 1988 and never fully recovered to reach his full potential.

Released in 1990, Hesp resumed his career with Heerenveen, going to play until 2005 with several clubs in the top level (Roda, AZ, NEC and RBC) and also spending three seasons – two complete, two halves – with second division's Top Oss.

Hesp played 4 games for the Netherlands national under-19 football team.

== Post-playing career ==
In 2005, Hesp became president of the Vereniging van Contractspelers (VVCS), the Dutch union for professional soccer players, and in 2013 announced he would function as a contact for gay soccer players, to assist them in their coming-out; a 2014 poll by the VVCS and the John Blankenstein Foundation indicated that soccer's culture of machismo was an important cause of homophobia in the sport.

After suffering from a burn-out, Hesp became a personal trainer and runs a gym in Alkmaar.

== Personal life ==
Hesp's older brother, Ruud, was also a professional footballer. A goalkeeper, he was best known for his three-year stint with Spain's Barcelona; the pair played together in the 1995–96 campaign, at Roda.
