= Wout Neelen =

Dutch footballer (born 2000)

Personal information
- Date of birth: 20 October 2000 (age 26)
- Place of birth: Wouw, Netherlands
- Height: 1.84 m (6 ft 0 in)
- Position: Centre-back

Team information
- Current team: Kloetinge
- Number: 20

Youth career
- RKSV Cluzona
- 2012–2019: NAC Breda

Senior career*
Years	Team	Apps	(Gls)
2019–2022	Jong NAC	10	(0)
2019–2022	NAC Breda	4	(0)
2022–2024	ASWH	32	(0)
2024–	Kloetinge	32	(1)
- * Club domestic league appearances and goals as of 08:39, 25 October 2026 (UTC)

Wout Neelen (born on 20 October 2000) is a Dutch footballer who plays as a centre back for Tweede Divisie club Kloetinge.

== Career ==
=== Cluzona and NAC ===
Wout Neelen played in the youth of RKSV Cluzona and NAC Breda. In 2019 he made the switch to Jong NAC and was occasionally in the selection of the first squad, initially as a bencher.

Neelen made his senior squad debut on 8 March 2020, in a 4–1 home win against Roda JC Kerkrade. He came on in the 90+1 minute for Jan Paul van Hecke. In June 2020 he signed his first professional contract. On 11 March 2022, Neelen played his first full game in the Eerste Divisie against De Graafschap. NAC won this game 2–0, also thanks to Neelen's contribution to its defense. Later in 2022, Neelen was released from NAC Breda making him a free player by the end of the season.

=== ASWH and Kloetinge ===
On 5 June, Neelen signed with ASWH that was about to relegate from the Tweede to the Derde Divisie before he played in its squad. Next summer, Neelen relegated with ASWH to the Vierde Divisie, where ASWH and Neelen experienced an exceptional season. In January 2024 Neelen signed with Kloetinge for the upcoming season. On 17 February 2024, he scored his first goal in an official senior league game, in ASWH's match against VV Heerjansdam. Wout Neelen won a section championship and three trimester championships with ASWH that season.
