= Andries Ulderink =

Dutch footballer and coach

Personal information
- Date of birth: 30 July 1969 (age 57)
- Place of birth: Zwolle, Netherlands

Team information
- Current team: Cape Town City

Youth career
- VV Reünie

Senior career*
Years	Team	Apps	(Gls)
- VV Reünie
1989–1990	HSC '21		

Managerial career
- 1994–1997: AZSV
- 1997: SC Varsseveld
- 1998–2001: DCS
- 2001–2002: Rohda Raalte
- 2003–2004: Rohda Raalte
- 2007–2008: Be Quick '28
- 2008–2011: Go Ahead Eagles
- 2011–2012: De Graafschap
- 2012–2013: AGOVV
- 2014–2016: Jong Ajax
- 2018–2020: Ajax Cape Town
- 2024–2025: Rangers (assistant)
- 2025: Royal Antwerp
- 2025: Cape Town City
- 2025–2026: Bayer Leverkusen (assistant)
- 2026-: Cape Town City
- * Club domestic league appearances and goals

Andries Ulderink (born 30 July 1969) is a Dutch association football coach and a former player. He coached Dutch professional and amateur teams. He is the head coach of South African Premiership club Cape Town City.

== Football career ==
Ulderink was a footballer at VV Reünie and HSC '21. His position was forward.

=== Manager ===
Ulderink started coaching at AZSV. He then continued to SC Varsseveld, SV DCS, and Rohda Raalte. His first manager gig at a professional team was assistant coach at De Graafschap. He returned to Rohda Raalte, assisted again De Graafschap, lead the youth department at De Graafschap, and coached Be Quick '28. His first main coach position at a professional team was for Go Ahead Eagles, followed by De Graafschap, AGOVV, scout at Ajax, Jong Ajax, and assistant at Reading (2016–2018). In 2018, he became the manager of Ajax Cape Town. In February 2020, Ulderink stepped back from the position because he declared his solidarity with technical director Hans Vonk, who was in conflict with the club chairman. He became assistant coach to Ron Jans at Twente in June 2020.

Ulderink joined Cape Town City shortly before their relegation playoffs at the end of the 2024–25 season. Following the club's relegation, he left to take up an assistant manager role at Bayer Leverkusen. In mid-2026 Ulderink joined Cape Town City replacing Jan Vreman as Head Coach.
