= Fritz Korbach =

German football manager (1945–2011)

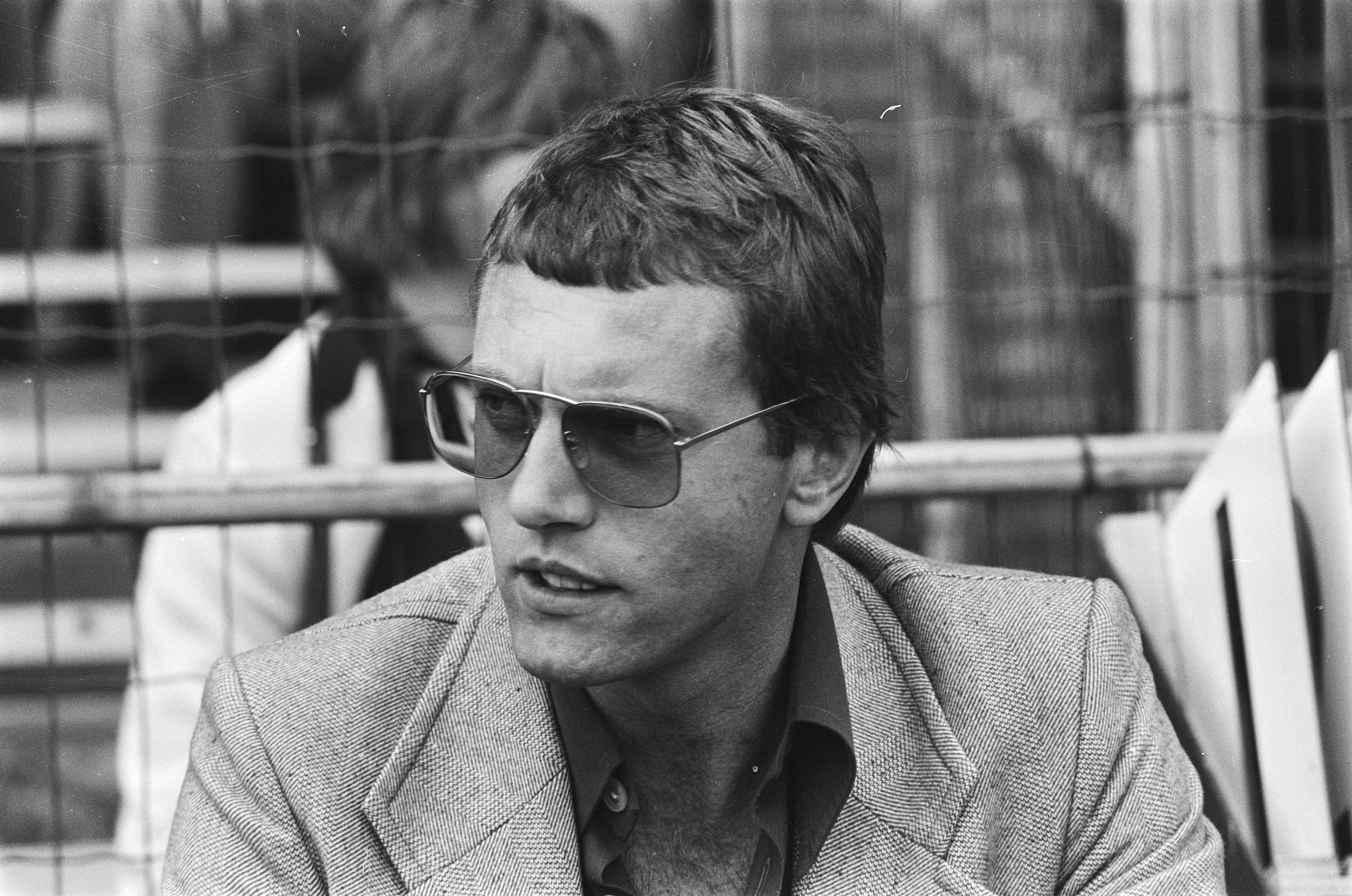
- Korbach in 1978

Personal information
- Date of birth: 18 July 1945
- Place of birth: Diez, Germany
- Date of death: 14 August 2011 (aged 66)
- Place of death: Leeuwarden, Netherlands

Senior career*
Years	Team	Apps	(Gls)
- ZSC Patria
- SV Baarn

Managerial career
- 1973–1977: FC Wageningen
- 1977–1982: FC Zwolle
- 1982–1983: FC Volendam
- 1983–1986: FC Twente
- 1986–1988: SC Cambuur
- 1988–1990: Go Ahead Eagles
- 1990–1992: SC Heerenveen
- 1992–1993: FC Volendam
- 1993–1995: SC Cambuur
- 1995–1998: De Graafschap
- 1999–2001: Heracles Almelo
- 2003: Sparta Rotterdam
- 2004–2005: Rohda Raalte
- 2005–2006: PSM Makassar
- 2006–2007: Harkemase Boys
- * Club domestic league appearances and goals

Fritz Korbach (18 July 1945 – 14 August 2011) was a German professional football player and manager. He was particularly well known in the Netherlands, where he served eleven different teams, including FC Wageningen, FC Zwolle, FC Volendam, FC Twente, SC Cambuur, Go Ahead Eagles, SC Heerenveen, De Graafschap, Heracles Almelo, Sparta Rotterdam (where his management spell famously lasted only two days), Rohda Raalte and Harkemase Boys.

== Playing career ==
As a player, Korbach was active for Dutch amateur clubs ZSC Patria and SV Baarn.

== Coaching career ==
=== Assistant at FC Utrecht ===
In 1970, Korbach was appointed assistant to Bert Jacobs at the newly formed club FC Utrecht. Prior to that, he had been co-trainer with the predecessor USV Elinkwijk, as assistant of Evert Mur.

=== FC Wageningen ===
The football instructor had his first post as manager at the FC Wageningen, At the end of his first season, he led Wageningen in winning the playoffs and securing promotion to the Eredivisie. Wageningen's first season ever in the Eredivisie was not successful; the club relegated in 1975.

=== PEC Zwolle ===
On 1 February 1977, it was announced that Korbach would start as PEC Zwolle's new manager. Given his experience at both Dutch tiers, and his ideas on scouting and youth programs, he was the most fit of the twelve candidates.

After one of the first matches in the 1977–78 season, Korbach attracted the anger of Heracles Almelo-coach Hennie Hollink, who threw a glass of lemonade in the face of Korbach, and slapped Korbach's face afterwards. They reconciled a few days later. After this incident, Korbach's team (with Rinus Israel Uri Banhoffer and Ron Jans), became the champion of the Eerste Divisie and promoted to the Eredivisie. In its debut in the highest class of the Netherlands the team reached the eighth place.

Korbach kept the club regularly safe from the relegation (with a 2–1 win against Feyenoord in his last season), before he signed at FC Volendam for the 1982–83 season. During his time at PEC Zwolle, Ajax wanted to contract Korbach. However, when the Amsterdam board consulted with then-PEC Zwolle chairman Jan Wiersma, Korbach stormed the boardroom, asking 'at what time the fucking would start.' After that, Korbach never heard anything again from Ajax.

=== FC Volendam ===
With Volendam his goal was to promote from the Eerste Divisie. Under Korbach, the tall defender Kees Guyt became a forwarder, thus scoring eleven goals. Frank Kramer returned to the club and became the top scorer of Volendam with 14 goals. With a 0–2 victory in the last match against FC VVV the team secured a second place behind DS'79 in the league, and Korbach's goal was achieved.

=== FC Twente ===
Despite this, the club and the coach parted ways, and FC Twente lured Korbach to Enschede for 1983–84 season. Twente had relegated in the previous year and wanted the immediate promotion. Korbach's sense of humor and enthusiasm worked well on FC Twente's selection; within one year Twente was back at the highest level. For the fourth time in succession Korbach promoted to the Eredivisie. After two more rather uneventful seasons at Twente, Korbach decided to leave after an 8–1 defeat against Ajax.

=== SC Cambuur ===
SC Cambuur, who needed a new manager after Simon Kistemaker left for DS'79, then secured Korbach's services as a manager for season 1986–87. Korbach gave confidence to his players and maintained a good relationship with the board. The atmosphere in the club improved and spectators found the way to the stadium again. Korbach developed a special game style, which had all the charms of English football: little fuss, attacking, demanding a lot of effort and a heartbreaking enthusiasm. It became a spectacular season, with Cambuur scoring 80 goals in 36 matches. However, this time Korbach's team ended third, two points short for promotion. The promotion competition was all that remained. On 18 June 1987, the deciding contest between Korbach's Cambuur and Kistemaker's DS'79 was played in the Cambuur Stadium, filled with 16,000 spectators. DS controlled the match and was already halfway the match at 0–2. Willem van der Ark was given a chance to change the odds when Cambuur was awarded a penalty, but failed hopelessly.

=== Go Ahead Eagles ===
The 1987–88 season was very disappointing. Cambuur finished eleventh and Korbach left for Go Ahead Eagles in Deventer. As with many clubs before, he once again had the task of leading the club into the Eredivisie, this time with the help of his assistant Henk ten Cate.

=== SC Heerenveen ===
After less than two years without success, Korbach found a new challenge at SC Heerenveen before his second season ended. Although only 16th place in the second Dutch league was reached, the club rose to the Eredivisie by the play-offs for the first time in history. However, the club relegated the next year.

One of Korbach's skills was his talent to teach his players tactics in a simple yet charismatic and humorous way. As player René van der Gijp recalled: "If he is talking about tactics, the trashman at the corner of the street understands it too." This talent had a downside: in a February 1991 interview, Korbach called player Bryan Roy ("een kleine rotneger"; "a putrid little negro"), Romário ("die koffieboon van PSV", "that coffee bean of PSV"). and Simon Tahamata ("treinkaper"; "train hijacker"). In the 1991–92 season the team finished third in the Eerste Divisie, nearly missing the promotion. Therefore, Korbach was replaced by Foppe de Haan in October 1992. After exactly ten years, the coach went back to the struggling FC Volendam in November. Under Korbach, the club remained unbeaten the next fifteen matches, finishing in the Eredivisie at a sixth place. After a bad start in the following season, he resigned and returned to SC Cambuur in October 1993.

=== De Graafschap ===
Korbach signed a second time with SC Cambuur-Leeuwarden and stayed with the Leeuwarden club for two years. After the 1994 relegation, they failed tot return to the first league in 1995. Between November 1995 and December 1998 he supervised the De Graafschap. At the beginning of the 1996–97 season, coach Fritz Korbach bluffed that they would finish 8th in the Eredivisie. With new players such as Eric Viscaal and Hans van de Haar, mixed with regional players, the team played a good exhibition match against FC Barcelona and then continued to play well. After a win on PSV and a draw in the Amsterdam Arena, the team was even in third place. Eventually they finished at an eight place, just as Korbach predicted.

=== Two days at Sparta ===
In 1999, Korbach took over the trainer's office at Heracles Almelo. After two years in Almelo, he paused from 2001 to 2003 before Sparta Rotterdam secured the coach's services. There, Korbach was to prevent the descent from the Eredivisie. The coach stayed only two days. The reason for this was that his doctor advised him to avoid stress, and Korbach had already given up the job after two training sessions.

=== Amateur clubs ===
At the 2003–04 season, he worked for the Dutch amateur club Rohda Raalte. In the summer of 2005, he ventured for the first time to train a team outside the Netherlands. The Indonesian club PSM Makassar lured the German to Asia. It was hoped that he would win the Indonesia Super League. This did not happen and Korbach returned to the Netherlands. On 26 October 2006, he succeeded Pieter Bijl at the subclass association Harkemase Boys for a short while.

== Death ==
Early 2011, Throat Cancer was detected at Korbach at an advanced stage. In the summer of that year, the diagnosis followed that he had only few months to live. On 14 August 2011, he died from the consequences of a heart attack. The stadium of Cambuur Leeuwarden was used as the s memorial service for Fritz Korbach. FC Twente held a minute of silence for the Champions League play-off-match against Benfica, since, as Twente coach Co Adriaanse said: "I told the players that Fritz Korbach has been one of the best Dutch trainers of the last thirty years, and in addition a former coach of FC Twente."

== Legacy ==
Korbach became well known for leading mediocre Eerste Divisie sides to the Eredivisie. This sudden change in achievements has become known in the Netherlands as the 'Korbach-effect'.
