= Julius Bliek =

Dutch footballer (born 1994)

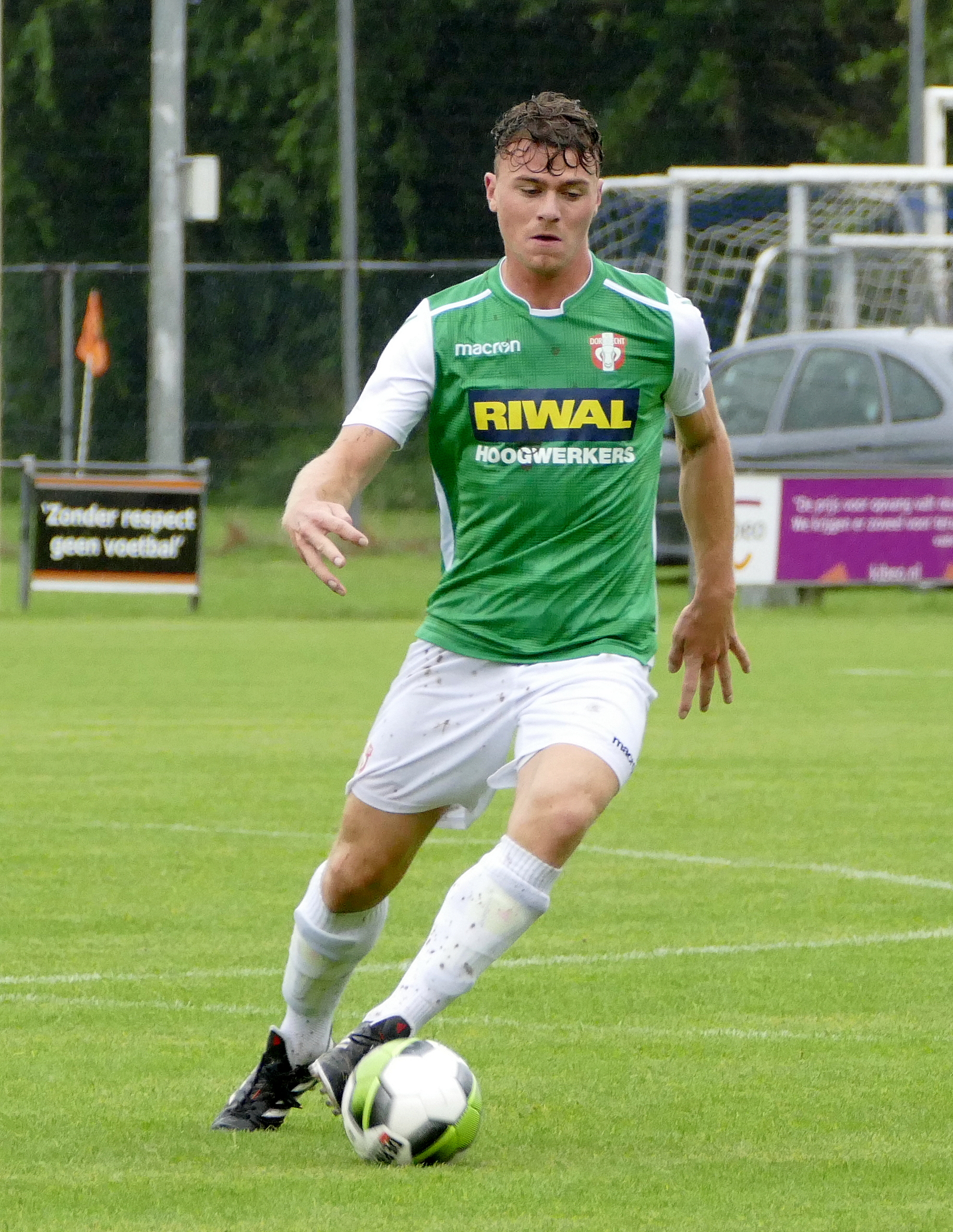

Personal information
- Date of birth: 9 June 1994 (age 32)
- Place of birth: Vlissingen, Netherlands
- Height: 1.88 m (6 ft 2 in)
- Position: Centre-back

Team information
- Current team: Kloetinge
- Number: 29

Youth career
- JVOZ Vlissingen

Senior career*
| Years | Team | Apps | (Gls) |
| 2011–2012 | DFS | | |
| 2012–2013 | SV Duiveland | | |
| 2014 | FC Dauwendaele | | |
| 2014–2017 | Kloetinge | | |
| 2017–2018 | Dordrecht | 27 | (1) |
| 2018–2020 | Go Ahead Eagles | 34 | (3) |
| 2020 | Saburtalo | 0 | (0) |
| 2020–2021 | Dordrecht | 25 | (1) |
| 2021–2022 | Sliema Wanderers | 9 | (0) |
| 2022–2023 | Rupel Boom | 34 | (1) |
| 2023–2025 | Kloetinge | 54 | (3) |
| 2026– | Kloetinge | 1 | (0) |
- * Club domestic league appearances and goals as of 08:36, 25 October 2026 (UTC)

Julius Bliek (born 9 June 1994) is a Dutch footballer who plays as a centre-back for Tweede Divisie club Kloetinge.

Bliek worked in his family's bakery and played amateur football in Zeeland before FC Dordrecht signed him in 2017, aged 23. He went on to play for Go Ahead Eagles and abroad in Georgia, Malta and Belgium, before returning to Kloetinge in 2023. He stopped playing in 2025 to run the family bakery with his brother, but rejoined Kloetinge a year later.

== Early life and career ==
Bliek grew up in Burgh-Haamstede. His family runs Bliek Meesterbakkers, a bakery business founded by his great-grandfather in Veere and since based in Middelburg, Zeeland. He played youth football for JVOZ and then for the Zeeland amateur clubs DFS, SV Duiveland, FC Dauwendaele and Kloetinge. Alongside his football, he worked full-time in the family business.

== Club career ==
=== Dordrecht ===
In 2017, Bliek left Kloetinge for Eerste Divisie club FC Dordrecht on a one-year amateur contract. He made his professional debut on 29 September 2017, aged 23, in a 2–2 home draw with FC Volendam. He was replaced by Mailson Lima in the 75th minute. He made 27 league appearances that season. Dordrecht won the third period title of the 2017–18 Eerste Divisie. ELF Voetbal described him as a late bloomer and one of the revelations of Dordrecht's season.

=== Go Ahead Eagles ===
On 30 May 2018, Bliek signed a two-year contract with Go Ahead Eagles. He made 25 league appearances in the 2018–19 season and nine in the first half of the 2019–20 season.

=== Saburtalo and return to Dordrecht ===
In January 2020, Bliek moved to Saburtalo Tbilisi, who had finished third in Georgia. He did not make an appearance for the club. On 23 June 2020, he returned to Dordrecht on a one-year contract. He played 25 league matches in the 2020–21 season and left when his contract expired in June 2021.

=== Sliema Wanderers and Rupel Boom ===
In August 2021, Bliek joined Maltese Premier League club Sliema Wanderers on a one-year contract. He made nine league appearances. He then spent the 2022–23 season in Belgium with Rupel Boom.

=== Kloetinge ===
In 2023, Bliek returned to Kloetinge. In May 2025, it was announced that he would leave the club at the end of the season. He stopped playing that summer, as combining football with running the family bakery with his brother had become too demanding.

In August 2026, Bliek returned to Kloetinge for a third spell, after the club had won promotion to the Tweede Divisie. He had already decided to play again and had registered with FC De Westhoek, but the move was reversed because he had not yet played an official match for them. He began working on his fitness with the aim of playing in the Tweede Divisie later in the season.

== Career statistics ==
As of match played 14 December 2018

Appearances and goals by club, season and competition
| Club | Season | League | | | National Cup | | Other | | Total | |
| Club | Season | Division | Apps | Goals | Apps | Goals | Apps | Goals | Apps | Goals |
|---|---|---|---|---|---|---|---|---|---|---|
| FC Dordrecht | 2017–18 | Eerste Divisie | 27 | 1 | 0 | 0 | 3 (Note: Appearances in play-offs) | 1 | 30 | 2 |
| Go Ahead Eagles | 2018–19 | Eerste Divisie | 8 | 2 | 2 | 0 | — | | 10 | 2 |
| Career total | | | 35 | 3 | 2 | 0 | 3 | 1 | 40 | 4 |
