= Simon Kistemaker =

Simon Kistemaker may refer to

- Simon Kistemaker (football manager) (1941–2021), Dutch football manager
- Simon J. Kistemaker (1930–2017), American New Testament scholar
