= Yassine Azzagari =

Dutch footballer (born 2001)

Personal information
- Date of birth: 24 July 2001 (age 25)
- Place of birth: Goes, Netherlands
- Height: 1.76 m (5 ft 9 in)
- Position: Midfielder

Team information
- Current team: Kloetinge
- Number: 14

Youth career
- 2006–2012: Kloetinge
- 2012–2018: JVOZ
- 2018–2019: NAC

Senior career*
Years	Team	Apps	(Gls)
2019–2022	NAC	41	(2)
2022–2024	Eindhoven	16	(0)
2025–	Kloetinge	55	(3)
- * Club domestic league appearances and goals as of 08:38, 25 October 2026 (UTC)

Yassine Azzagari (born 24 July 2001) is a Dutch professional footballer who plays as a midfielder for Tweede Divisie club Kloetinge.

== Early and personal life ==
Azzagari was born in Goes and is of Moroccan descent, with his family having settled in the Netherlands in the 1970s. His father played for Apollo in 's-Gravenpolder whilst his eldest brother Jihad played youth football for SBV Excelsior, Club Bruges and FC Utrecht and his second-eldest brother Sofyan played youth football for NAC Breda and senior football for VV Kloetinge and VV Goes.

== Career ==
Azzagari started his career with VV Kloetinge and later played youth football for JVOZ before transferring to NAC Breda in 2018. After appearing in the matchday squad for the first time in a 4–0 defeat at home to Feyenoord on 24 April 2019, Azzagari made his debut for the club in the final game of the season on 15 May 2019 as a substitute in a 0–0 Eredivisie draw with PEC Zwolle, with Breda relegated to the Eerste Divisie. He signed his first professional contract with the club the following month, signing a contract until mid-2022. After being ruled out by injury for the early parts of the 2019–20 season, He scored from 40 yards for NAC Breda U19 in December 2019, before making his first appearance of the season against Jong AZ on 17 January 2020, and his first senior start against Go Ahead Eagles nine days later. He appeared 9 times across the 2018–19 season.

On 8 May 2022, Azzagari signed a two-year contract with FC Eindhoven, with an option for an additional year. On 5 January 2024, his contract with Eindhoven was terminated by mutual consent.
