= 2017–18 Eerste Divisie =

62nd season of the second-tier football league in Netherlands

Eerste Divisie
- Season: 2017–18
- Champions: Jong Ajax (1st title)
- Promoted: Fortuna Sittard; De Graafschap; FC Emmen
- Relegated: No teams relegated.
- Matches: 380
- Goals: 1,233 (3.24 per match)
- Top goalscorer: Mart Lieder (30 goals)

The 2017–18 Eerste Divisie, known as Jupiler League for sponsorship reasons, was the sixty-second season of Eerste Divisie since its establishment in 1955. It began in August 2017 with the first matches of the season and ended in May 2018 with the returns of the finals of the promotion/relegation play-offs, involving also the 16th- and 17th-placed teams from the 2017–18 Eredivisie.

== Teams ==
A total of 20 teams took part in the league. 2016–17 Eerste Divisie champions VVV-Venlo gained promotion to the Eredivisie, and was replaced by Go Ahead Eagles, who finished bottom in the 2016–17 Eredivisie. NAC won the post-season playoff, and were replaced by NEC. Also, Achilles '29 were relegated and replaced by Tweede Divisie champions Jong AZ who became the fifth reserve side to feature in the second tier of Dutch football.

At an extraordinary KNVB federation meeting on 2 October 2017, representatives of amateur and professional football reached an agreement about the route to be taken to renew the football pyramid. Part of the agreement was that no promotion/relegation would take place between the Eerste and Tweede Divisie this season.

Location of teams in the Eerste Divisie 2017–18

Club	Location	Venue	Capacity
Jong Ajax	Amsterdam	Sportpark De Toekomst	4,000
Almere City	Almere	Yanmar Stadion	3,000
Jong AZ	Alkmaar	AZ's Trainingcomplex	1,500
Cambuur	Leeuwarden	Cambuur Stadion	10,500
De Graafschap	Doetinchem	De Vijverberg	12,600
Den Bosch	's-Hertogenbosch	De Vliert	9,000
Dordrecht	Dordrecht	GN Bouw Stadion	4,088
FC Eindhoven	Eindhoven	Jan Louwers Stadion	4,600
Emmen	Emmen	De JENS Vesting	8,600
Fortuna Sittard	Sittard	Fortuna Sittard Stadion	10,300
Go Ahead Eagles	Deventer	Adelaarshorst	10,400
Helmond Sport	Helmond	Lavans Stadion	4,100
MVV	Maastricht	De Geusselt	10,000
NEC	Nijmegen	Stadion de Goffert	12,500
Oss	Oss	Frans Heesenstadion	4,700
Jong PSV	Eindhoven	De Herdgang	2,500
RKC Waalwijk	Waalwijk	Mandemakers Stadion	7,508
Telstar	Velsen	Rabobank IJmond Stadion	3,625
Jong FC Utrecht	Utrecht	variable	unknown
Volendam	Volendam	Kras Stadion	6,260

=== Personnel and kits ===
Club	Manager	Kit manufacturer	Sponsors
Jong Ajax	(Netherlands) Michael Reiziger	Adidas	Ziggo
Almere City	(Netherlands) Jack de Gier	Adidas	Van Wijnen
Jong AZ	(Netherlands) Martin Haar	Under Armour	AFAS
Cambuur	(Netherlands) Marinus Dijkhuizen	Nike	Bouwgroep Dijkstra Draisma
De Graafschap	(Netherlands) Henk de Jong	Nike	flexfactory
Den Bosch	(Netherlands) Wil Boessen	Macron	Van Wanrooij
Dordrecht	(Netherlands) Gérard de Nooijer	Macron	Riwal Hoogwerkers
Eindhoven	(Netherlands) Wilfred van Leeuwen	Joma	VDL Groep
Emmen	(Netherlands) Dick Lukkien	Robey	Q&S Gartendeco
Fortuna Sittard	(Portugal) Cláudio Braga (caretaker)	Givova	Fitland
Go Ahead Eagles	(Netherlands) Leon Vlemmings	Hummel	Drukwerkdeal
Helmond Sport	(Netherlands) Roy Hendriksen	Hummel	Vescom
MVV	(Netherlands) Ron Elsen	Masita	Drink Water
NEC	(Netherlands) Pepijn Lijnders	Legea	Ouwehands Dierenpark
Oss	(Netherlands) Klaas Wels	Erima	NGSN
Jong PSV	(Netherlands) Dennis Haar	Umbro	Philips
RKC Waalwijk	(Netherlands) Peter van den Berg	Hummel	Mandemakers Keukens
Telstar	(Netherlands) Mike Snoei	Hummel	MPM Oil
Jong FC Utrecht	(Netherlands) Robin Pronk	Hummel	Zorg van de Zaak
Volendam	(Netherlands) Misha Salden	Jako	HSB

== Standings ==
Pos	Team	Pld	W	D	L	GF	GA	GD	Pts	Promotion, qualification or relegation
1	Jong Ajax (Note: Reserves teams aren't eligible to be promoted to the Eredivisie.) (C)	38	25	4	9	89	54	+35	79	
2	Fortuna Sittard (Note: Winner of the Second and Fourth Period (games 12-20 and 30-38).) (P)	38	24	6	8	81	41	+40	78	Promotion to the Eredivisie
3	NEC (Note: Winner of the First Period (games 3-11).)	38	22	8	8	82	46	+36	74	Qualification to promotion play-offs Second round
4	De Graafschap (O, P)	38	18	11	9	78	47	+31	65	Qualification to promotion play-offs Second round
5	Jong PSV	38	19	7	12	76	54	+22	64	
6	Telstar	38	16	13	9	66	63	+3	61	Qualification to promotion play-offs Second round
7	Emmen (O, P)	38	14	16	8	58	50	+8	58	Qualification to promotion play-offs Second round
8	Cambuur	38	16	10	12	58	53	+5	58	Qualification to promotion play-offs First round
9	Almere City	38	15	7	16	70	76	−6	52	Qualification to promotion play-offs First round
10	MVV	38	14	8	16	57	56	+1	50	Qualification to promotion play-offs First round
11	Den Bosch	38	12	11	15	59	55	+4	47	
12	Eindhoven	38	14	5	19	61	83	−22	47	
13	Dordrecht (Note: Winner of the Third Period (games 21-29).)	38	14	5	19	57	81	−24	47	Qualification to promotion play-offs First round
14	Volendam	38	13	7	18	59	67	−8	46	
15	Oss	38	12	10	16	53	65	−12	46	
16	Jong AZ	38	14	4	20	57	70	−13	46	
17	Go Ahead Eagles	38	9	10	19	48	68	−20	37	
18	RKC Waalwijk	38	8	13	17	37	61	−24	37	
19	Helmond Sport	38	9	9	20	50	67	−17	36	
20	Jong FC Utrecht (R)	38	7	6	25	37	76	−39	27	Relegation to the Tweede Divisie

Source: Soccerway, Jupiler League (in Dutch)
Rules for classification: Season in progress: 1) Most points won; 2) Less points lost; 3) Goal difference; 4) Goals scored; 5) Alphabetical order. End of season: 1) Points; 2) Goal difference; 3) Goals scored; 4) Head-to-head points; 5) Head-to-head goal difference; 6) Head-to-head away goals scored; 7) Play-off if relevant for deciding champion, relegation, international competitions and play-offs qualification, otherwise by draw. 8) Penalty shoot-out (only after a play-off)
(C) Champions; (O) Play-off winners; (P) Promoted; (R) Relegated

== Period tables ==
=== Period 1 ===
Pos	Team	Pld	W	D	L	GF	GA	GD	Pts	Qualification
1	Jong Ajax	9	6	2	1	21	10	+11	20	Reserves teams cannot participate in the promotion play-offs
2	NEC	9	6	2	1	19	11	+8	20	Qualification to promotion play-offs
3	Telstar	9	5	3	1	22	18	+4	18	
4	Fortuna Sittard	9	5	2	2	19	9	+10	17	
5	Go Ahead Eagles	9	4	4	1	18	10	+8	16	
6	Den Bosch	9	4	3	2	16	10	+6	15	
7	De Graafschap	9	3	5	1	13	7	+6	14	
8	Oss	9	3	4	2	16	19	−3	13	
9	Emmen	9	2	6	1	12	9	+3	12	
10	MVV	9	3	2	4	13	14	−1	11	
11	Jong PSV	9	3	2	4	11	19	−8	11	Reserves teams cannot participate in the promotion play-offs
12	Eindhoven	9	3	1	5	13	15	−2	10	
13	Cambuur	9	2	4	3	10	12	−2	10	
14	Dordrecht	9	2	4	3	13	17	−4	10	
15	Jong FC Utrecht	9	2	3	4	10	15	−5	9	Reserves teams cannot participate in the promotion play-offs
16	Almere City	9	2	3	4	12	18	−6	9	
17	RKC Waalwijk	9	1	5	3	8	11	−3	8	
18	Jong AZ	9	2	1	6	11	19	−8	7	Reserves teams cannot participate in the promotion play-offs
19	Helmond Sport	9	1	3	5	10	17	−7	6	
20	Volendam	9	0	3	6	7	14	−7	3	

Source: Jupiler League (in Dutch)
Rules for classification: 1) points; 2) goal difference; 3) number of goals scored

=== Period 2 ===
Pos	Team	Pld	W	D	L	GF	GA	GD	Pts	Qualification
1	Fortuna Sittard	9	8	0	1	27	9	+18	24	Qualification to promotion play-offs
2	Almere City	9	6	2	1	25	15	+10	20	
3	NEC	9	6	1	2	29	13	+16	19	Period 1 winner
4	Jong PSV	9	5	1	3	21	11	+10	16	Reserves teams cannot participate in the promotion play-offs
5	Cambuur	9	5	1	3	14	13	+1	16	
6	Volendam	9	5	1	3	15	17	−2	16	
7	Eindhoven	9	5	1	3	14	19	−5	16	
8	RKC Waalwijk	9	4	2	3	11	14	−3	14	
9	Telstar	9	4	2	3	12	17	−5	14	
10	Jong Ajax	9	4	1	4	21	15	+6	13	Reserves teams cannot participate in the promotion play-offs
11	Emmen	9	3	4	2	15	15	0	13	
12	Den Bosch	9	3	3	3	17	14	+3	12	
13	Helmond Sport	9	3	3	3	11	10	+1	12	
14	De Graafschap	9	3	2	4	18	13	+5	11	
15	MVV	9	3	2	4	13	13	0	11	
16	Oss	9	3	2	4	10	14	−4	11	
17	Dordrecht	9	3	0	6	12	24	−12	9	
18	Jong AZ	9	1	0	8	10	23	−13	3	Reserves teams cannot participate in the promotion play-offs
19	Go Ahead Eagles	9	0	3	6	6	20	−14	3	
20	Jong FC Utrecht	9	0	1	8	6	18	−12	1	Reserves teams cannot participate in the promotion play-offs

Source: Jupiler League (in Dutch)
Rules for classification: 1) points; 2) goal difference; 3) number of goals scored

=== Period 3 ===
Pos	Team	Pld	W	D	L	GF	GA	GD	Pts	Qualification
1	Dordrecht	9	7	0	2	16	10	+6	21	Qualification to promotion play-offs
2	Emmen	9	6	2	1	16	10	+6	20	
3	Jong Ajax	9	6	1	2	21	12	+9	19	Reserves teams cannot participate in the promotion play-offs
4	Telstar	9	5	2	2	25	18	+7	17	
5	Jong AZ	9	5	2	2	14	9	+5	17	Reserves teams cannot participate in the promotion play-offs
6	De Graafschap	9	5	1	3	22	12	+10	16	
7	NEC	9	5	1	3	14	9	+5	16	Period 1 winner
8	Volendam	9	5	1	3	22	19	+3	16	
9	Jong PSV	9	4	2	3	15	13	+2	14	Reserves teams cannot participate in the promotion play-offs
10	MVV	9	4	1	4	16	14	+2	13	
11	Helmond Sport	9	4	0	5	15	15	0	12	
12	Cambuur	9	3	3	3	12	12	0	12	
13	Den Bosch	9	2	4	3	11	10	+1	10	
14	Oss	9	3	1	5	13	14	−1	10	
15	Go Ahead Eagles	9	3	1	5	11	15	−4	10	
16	Fortuna Sittard	9	2	3	4	10	13	−3	9	Period 2 winner
17	Almere City	9	3	0	6	13	20	−7	9	
18	Jong FC Utrecht	9	2	1	6	10	23	−13	7	Reserves teams cannot participate in the promotion play-offs
19	RKC Waalwijk	9	1	2	6	9	19	−10	5	
20	Eindhoven	9	1	0	8	9	27	−18	3	

Source: Jupiler League (in Dutch)
Rules for classification: 1) points; 2) goal difference; 3) number of goals scored

=== Period 4 ===
Pos	Team	Pld	W	D	L	GF	GA	GD	Pts	Qualification
1	Fortuna Sittard	9	8	1	0	18	5	+13	25	Period 2 winner
2	Jong Ajax	9	7	0	2	20	14	+6	21	Reserves teams cannot participate in the promotion play-offs
3	Cambuur	9	6	2	1	21	12	+9	20	
4	De Graafschap	9	6	2	1	21	13	+8	20	
5	Jong PSV	9	6	1	2	25	8	+17	19	Reserves teams cannot participate in the promotion play-offs
6	Eindhoven	9	5	1	3	22	19	+3	16	
7	NEC	9	4	3	2	16	11	+5	15	Period 1 winner
8	Jong AZ	9	4	1	4	17	17	0	13	Reserves teams cannot participate in the promotion play-offs
9	Almere City	9	4	1	4	18	19	−1	13	
10	MVV	9	3	2	4	11	12	−1	11	
11	Volendam	9	3	1	5	13	14	−1	10	
12	Telstar	9	2	4	3	5	8	−3	10	
13	Jong FC Utrecht	9	3	1	5	10	15	−5	10	Reserves teams cannot participate in the promotion play-offs
14	RKC Waalwijk	9	2	4	3	8	13	−5	10	
15	Emmen	9	2	3	4	12	15	−3	9	
16	Den Bosch	9	3	0	6	13	17	−4	9	
17	Go Ahead Eagles	9	2	1	6	9	18	−9	7	
18	Oss	9	1	3	5	10	18	−8	6	
19	Helmond Sport	9	1	2	6	11	21	−10	5	
20	Dordrecht	9	1	1	7	13	24	−11	4	Period 3 winner

Source: Jupiler League (in Dutch)
Rules for classification: 1) points; 2) goal difference; 3) number of goals scored

== Results ==
Home \ Away	ALM	CAM	DBO	DOR	EIN	EMM	FOR	GAE	GRA	HEL	JAJ	JAZ	JPS	JUT	MVV	NEC	OSS	RKC	TEL	VOL
Almere City		1–1	1–1	1–2	5–1	2–2	1–4	2–0	2–1	3–1	1–2	3–2	2–1	2–1	3–2	3–2	2–2	3–2	2–3	2–0
Cambuur	2–1		2–2	3–0	3–2	1–1	1–0	2–1	3–2	4–1	1–2	3–2	0–1	2–2	0–2	1–1	1–3	1–1	2–1	2–2
Den Bosch	1–3	1–2		4–1	4–0	1–2	2–4	3–0	1–1	2–2	2–5	1–3	5–0	1–0	2–1	3–0	0–0	0–0	3–2	3–1
Dordrecht	1–1	0–3	0–3		4–3	2–2	3–0	1–2	1–1	3–2	2–3	3–2	2–3	2–1	2–4	3–3	2–0	1–0	2–3	2–2
Eindhoven	3–2	2–1	0–1	0–1		2–1	1–3	3–2	2–4	3–2	2–3	1–3	1–2	5–2	3–2	3–2	1–3	3–1	2–2	1–0
Emmen	2–2	2–0	2–2	1–3	1–1		0–0	0–0	5–2	0–0	2–2	0–2	3–1	0–0	2–1	1–0	1–1	2–1	2–3	2–3
Fortuna Sittard	2–1	3–2	2–0	5–1	2–2	1–2		2–1	1–1	3–0	2–1	5–1	1–0	3–1	3–0	1–2	4–0	6–0	1–1	1–0
Go Ahead Eagles	2–1	1–3	1–2	0–3	1–3	0–1	0–1		0–4	3–1	4–1	2–1	1–1	0–0	3–1	1–1	2–1	0–0	1–1	1–1
De Graafschap	4–2	2–0	2–1	0–1	4–0	2–2	2–0	1–1		1–0	2–4	1–0	2–3	7–0	1–2	1–3	1–1	1–0	1–0	2–1
Helmond Sport	1–2	3–0	3–1	1–2	0–0	3–1	1–3	1–1	0–2		1–4	3–0	1–2	2–0	2–3	1–2	2–1	2–2	1–2	1–4
Jong Ajax	3–0	3–2	1–0	3–0	4–0	3–2	4–2	0–2	0–5	2–0		0–1	0–3	2–1	2–1	1–0	2–0	1–1	1–1	7–0
Jong AZ	4–1	0–1	1–1	3–1	1–2	2–1	2–0	0–0	2–2	1–3	4–2		2–1	1–3	3–1	2–7	3–1	2–1	2–2	0–2
Jong PSV	3–2	1–1	2–1	4–2	4–1	1–1	2–3	6–0	2–2	1–2	0–3	1–2		2–0	1–0	3–3	5–1	3–2	6–0	2–1
Jong FC Utrecht	2–4	1–3	1–1	0–2	1–2	1–2	0–1	1–0	1–4	0–0	2–1	1–0	1–4		2–1	0–2	0–3	5–2	0–1	2–1
MVV	3–0	1–1	3–0	1–0	2–0	0–1	1–2	4–3	1–3	3–1	0–4	3–0	0–0	3–1		4–1	1–1	0–0	0–0	2–1
NEC	3–1	3–1	1–0	6–0	2–1	1–1	1–1	5–1	1–1	1–1	2–1	2–0	2–0	3–1	4–1		2–1	2–0	3–0	3–0
Oss	5–1	2–1	1–1	3–1	1–1	2–3	1–2	1–6	1–4	0–0	0–3	2–1	0–3	2–0	1–0	3–0		3–1	0–0	1–0
RKC Waalwijk	0–4	0–0	1–1	1–0	0–1	0–2	1–1	2–1	0–0	1–0	2–4	1–0	3–2	2–2	1–1	0–2	2–1		4–1	1–3
Telstar	4–0	0–1	3–2	3–0	4–1	0–0	0–6	3–1	3–2	2–3	3–3	2–1	0–0	1–0	0–0	3–2	3–3	0–0		5–2
Volendam	1–1	0–1	1–0	4–1	3–2	2–3	2–0	4–3	0–0	2–2	1–2	4–1	1–0	2–1	2–2	0–2	3–1	0–1	3–4	

Source: Soccerway, Jupiler League (in Dutch)
Legend: Blue = home team win; Yellow = draw; Red = away team win.

== Season statistics ==
=== Top scorers ===
Rank	Player	Club	Games	Goal	Penalty scored	avg.
1.	(Netherlands) Mart Lieder	Eindhoven	31	30	5	0.97
2.	(United States) Andrija Novakovich	Telstar	35	19	3	0.54
3.	(Colombia) Mateo Cassierra	Jong Ajax	29	18	2	0.62
3.	(Belgium) Jonathan Okita	MVV	36	18	0	0.5
5.	(Netherlands) Cas Peters	Emmen	38	17	6	0.45
6.	(Netherlands) Sam Hendriks	Go Ahead Eagles	34	16	1	0.47
6.	(Netherlands) Arsenio Valpoort	Almere City	34	16	1	0.47
6.	(Netherlands) Daryl van Mieghem	De Graafschap	38	16	0	0.42
9.	(Netherlands) Anass Achahbar	NEC	25	15	1	0.6
9.	(Netherlands) Enzo Stroo	Volendam	33	15	0	0.45
9.	(Netherlands) Fatih Kamaçi	Oss	35	15	3	0.43
9.	(Portugal) Lisandro Semedo	Fortuna Sittard	37	15	5	0.41
9.	(Netherlands) Niek Vossebelt	Den Bosch	37	15	7	0.41
9.	(North Macedonia) Denis Mahmudov	Dordrecht	38	15	4	0.39

Source: soccerway, Jupiler League

=== Hat-tricks(+) ===
Rnd	Player	Club	Goals	Date	Home	Score	Away
3	(Netherlands) Mo Hamdaoui	Telstar	53' 60' 64'	1 September 2017	Telstar	3 – 3	Oss
7	(Portugal) André Vidigal	Fortuna Sittard	62' 82' 85'	29 September 2017	Telstar	0 – 6	Fortuna Sittard
7	(Netherlands) Niek Vossebelt	Den Bosch	45+2' (pen.) 63' (pen.) 73'	29 September 2017	Den Bosch	5 – 0	Jong PSV
13	(Netherlands) Mart Lieder	Eindhoven	1' 17' 23'	17 November 2017	Eindhoven	3 – 2	MVV
16	(Martinique) Steeven Langil	NEC	35' (pen.) 39' 67' (pen.)	1 December 2017	NEC	6 – 0	Dordrecht
19	(Netherlands) Anass Achahbar	NEC	22' 41' 64'	22 December 2017	Jong AZ	2 – 7	NEC
19	(Netherlands) Finn Stokkers	Fortuna Sittard	27' 32' 87'	23 December 2017	Fortuna Sittard	3 – 1	Jong FC Utrecht
19	(Colombia) Mateo Cassierra	Jong Ajax	42' 61' 69'	22 December 2017	Jong Ajax	7 – 0	Volendam
19	(Netherlands) Tom Overtoom	Almere City	29' 83' 84'	22 December 2017	Almere City	5 – 1	Eindhoven
20	(Netherlands) Anass Achahbar	NEC	17' 61' 62'	12 January 2018	NEC	5 – 1	Go Ahead Eagles
22	(Netherlands) Dani de Wit	Jong Ajax	8' 64' 71'	26 January 2018	RKC Waalwijk	2 – 4	Jong Ajax
23	(Netherlands) Mark Diemers	De Graafschap	16' 27' 54'	2 February 2018	De Graafschap	7 – 0	Jong FC Utrecht
24	(Netherlands) Richard van der Venne	Oss	40' 57' 64'	9 February 2018	Oss	5 – 1	Almere City
24	(Netherlands) Sylla Sow	Jong FC Utrecht	19' 24' 57'	9 February 2018	Jong FC Utrecht	5 – 2	RKC Waalwijk
30	(Netherlands) Kaj Sierhuis	Jong Ajax	3' 50' 85' (pen.)	16 March 2018	De Graafschap	2 – 4	Jong Ajax
30	(Netherlands) Mart Lieder	Eindhoven	4' 50' (pen.) 64'	16 March 2018	Eindhoven	5 – 2	Jong FC Utrecht
31	(Portugal) Lisandro Semedo	Fortuna Sittard	11' 18' (pen.) 71' (pen.)	23 March 2018	Fortuna Sittard	3 – 2	Cambuur
32	(Portugal) André Vidigal	Fortuna Sittard	2' 6' 26' (pen.)	30 March 2018	Almere City	1 – 4	Fortuna Sittard
32	(Netherlands) Nick Venema	Jong FC Utrecht	7' 28' (pen.) 31'	30 March 2018	Jong AZ	1 – 3	Jong FC Utrecht
33	(Netherlands) Donyell Malen	Jong PSV	16' 64' 86'	2 April 2018	Jong PSV	5 – 1	Oss
34	(Belgium) Jonathan Okita	MVV	10' 32' 90'	6 April 2018	Helmond Sport	2 – 3	MVV
35	(Netherlands) Tarik Tissoudali	De Graafschap	27' 34' 85'	9 April 2018	De Graafschap	4 – 2	Almere City
37	(Netherlands) Mart Lieder	Eindhoven	17' 47' 84' (pen.)	20 April 2018	Eindhoven	3 – 2	Almere City

=== Assists ===
Rank	Player	Club	Games	Assist	avg.
1.	(Netherlands) Arnaut Danjuma	NEC	28	16	0.57
2.	(Portugal) Lisandro Semedo	Fortuna Sittard	37	15	0.41
3.	(Netherlands) Nick Doodeman	Volendam	35	14	0.4
3.	(Netherlands) Daryl van Mieghem	De Graafschap	38	14	0.37
5.	(Netherlands) Carel Eiting	Jong Ajax	18	11	0.61
5.	(Netherlands) Ferdi Kadioglu	NEC	34	11	0.32
5.	(Belgium) Elton Kabangu	Eindhoven	38	11	0.29
8.	(Netherlands) Mark Diemers	De Graafschap	37	10	0.27
8.	(Netherlands) Joey Suk	Go Ahead Eagles	37	10	0.27
10.	(Netherlands) Achille Vaarnold	Almere City	20	9	0.45

Source: Soccerway, Jupiler League

== Promotion/relegation play-offs ==
Ten teams, two from the Eredivisie and eight from the Eerste Divisie, played for two spots in the 2018–19 Eredivisie, the remaining eight teams playing in the 2018–19 Eerste Divisie.

First round
FC Dordrecht (p)	1	4	5
Cambuur	4	1	5
MVV	1	2	3
Almere City	3	3	6

Second round
Emmen	4	1	5
NEC	0	4	4
FC Dordrecht	1	2	3
Sparta Rotterdam	2	2	4
Almere City	0	2	2
Roda JC	0	1	1
Telstar	3	2	5
De Graafschap	2	4	6

Third round
Emmen*	0	3	3
Sparta Rotterdam	0	1	1
Almere City	1	1	2
De Graafschap*	1	2	3

Key: * = Play-off winners, (a) = Wins because of away goals rule, (e) = Wins after extra time in second leg, (p) = Wins after penalty shoot-out.

== Attendances ==
Rank	Club	Average	% Change	Highest
1	NEC	9,636	-15.2%	11,402
2	De Graafschap	8,387	-1.6%	11,228
3	SC Cambuur	7,286	-3.0%	8,233
4	Go Ahead Eagles	6,901	-26.4%	9,180
5	MVV Maastricht	4,857	4.7%	8,152
6	Fortuna Sittard	4,851	164.2%	11,787
7	FC Emmen	3,248	10.7%	4,766
8	FC Volendam	3,153	-23.5%	4,396
9	FC Den Bosch	2,790	1.4%	3,586
10	SC Telstar	2,481	32.1%	3,223
11	FC Eindhoven	2,262	-16.1%	3,356
12	RKC Waalwijk	2,143	-3.2%	3,246
13	TOP Oss	1,991	-4.9%	3,341
14	Helmond Sport	1,719	-8.1%	2,891
15	Almere City	1,661	-5.6%	2,629
16	FC Dordrecht	1,543	0.9%	3,148
17	Jong Ajax	962	4.6%	2,000
18	Jong FC Utrecht	683	-18.4%	2,547
19	Jong AZ	664	60.4%	2,471
20	Jong PSV	644	7.7%	2,278
