= Kees Guyt =

Dutch footballer and coach

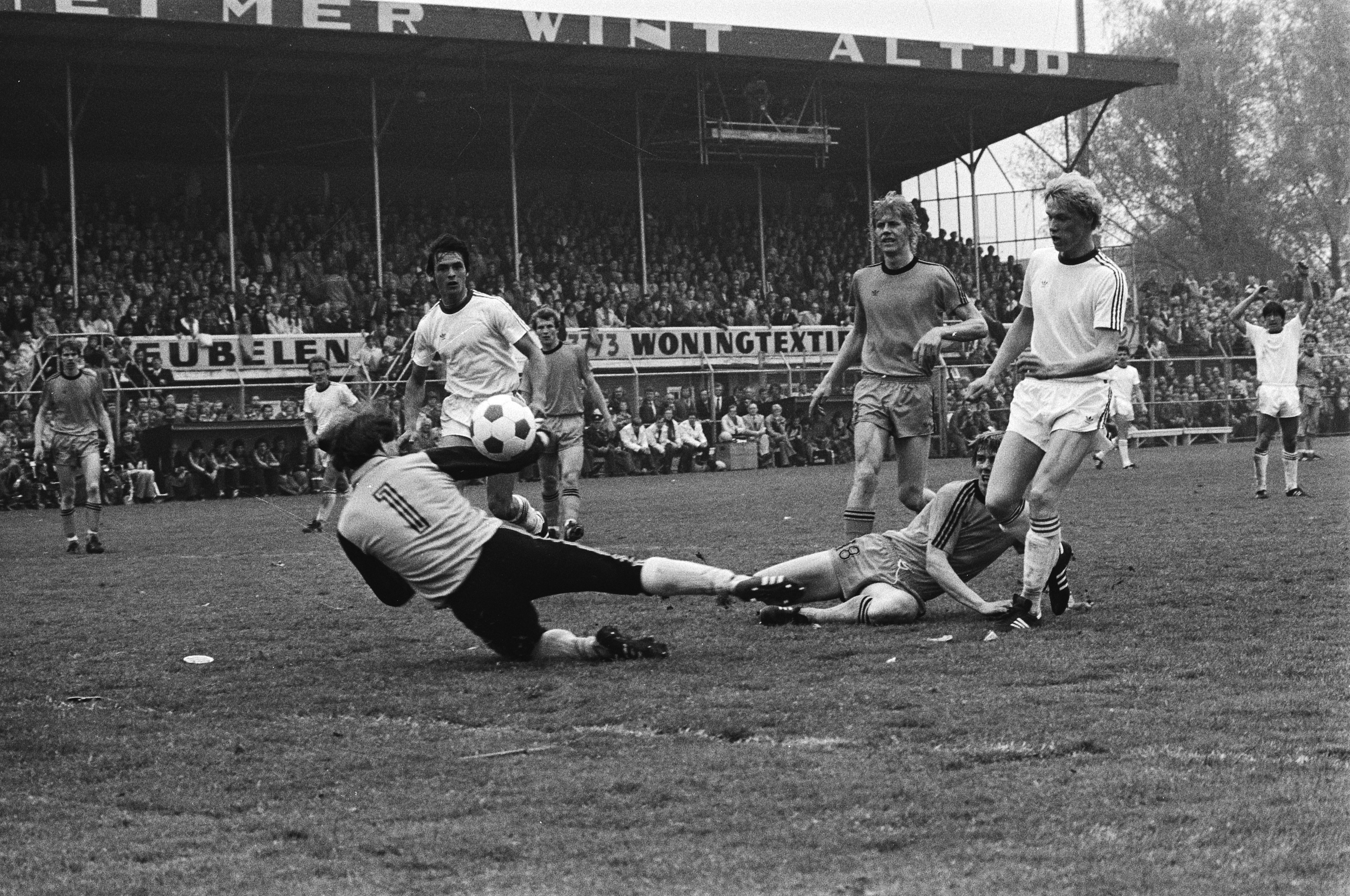
- Guyt (centre, 1977)

Personal information
- Date of birth: 14 October 1953
- Place of birth: Katwijk, Netherlands
- Date of death: 30 March 2012 (aged 58)
- Position: Defender

Senior career*
Years	Team	Apps	(Gls)
- Katwijk
1976–1985	Volendam	278	(31)
1985–1987	AZ '67	37	(1)
Total		315	(32)

Managerial career
- 1993-1996: Katwijk
- 1997-1999: Foreholte
- 2002-2004: RKAV Volendam
- 2004-2006: Swift
- 2006-2009: Blauw-Wit
- 2009–2010: Rijnvogels
- 2010–2012: DWV
- * Club domestic league appearances and goals

Kees Guyt (14 October 1953 – 30 March 2012) was a Dutch football player and coach.

== Career ==
Guyt began his career as an amateur with hometown club VV Katwijk, before playing as a professional with FC Volendam where Fritz Korbach turned him from defender to center forward, and AZ '67.

He later became a coach with a number of amateur clubs, including Foreholte, RKAV Volendam, Swift, Blauw-Wit Amsterdam, FC Rijnvogels and DWV.

== Personal life ==
He was the father of Danny Guijt and uncle to Edwin van der Sar.
