= Kloetinge =

- Village
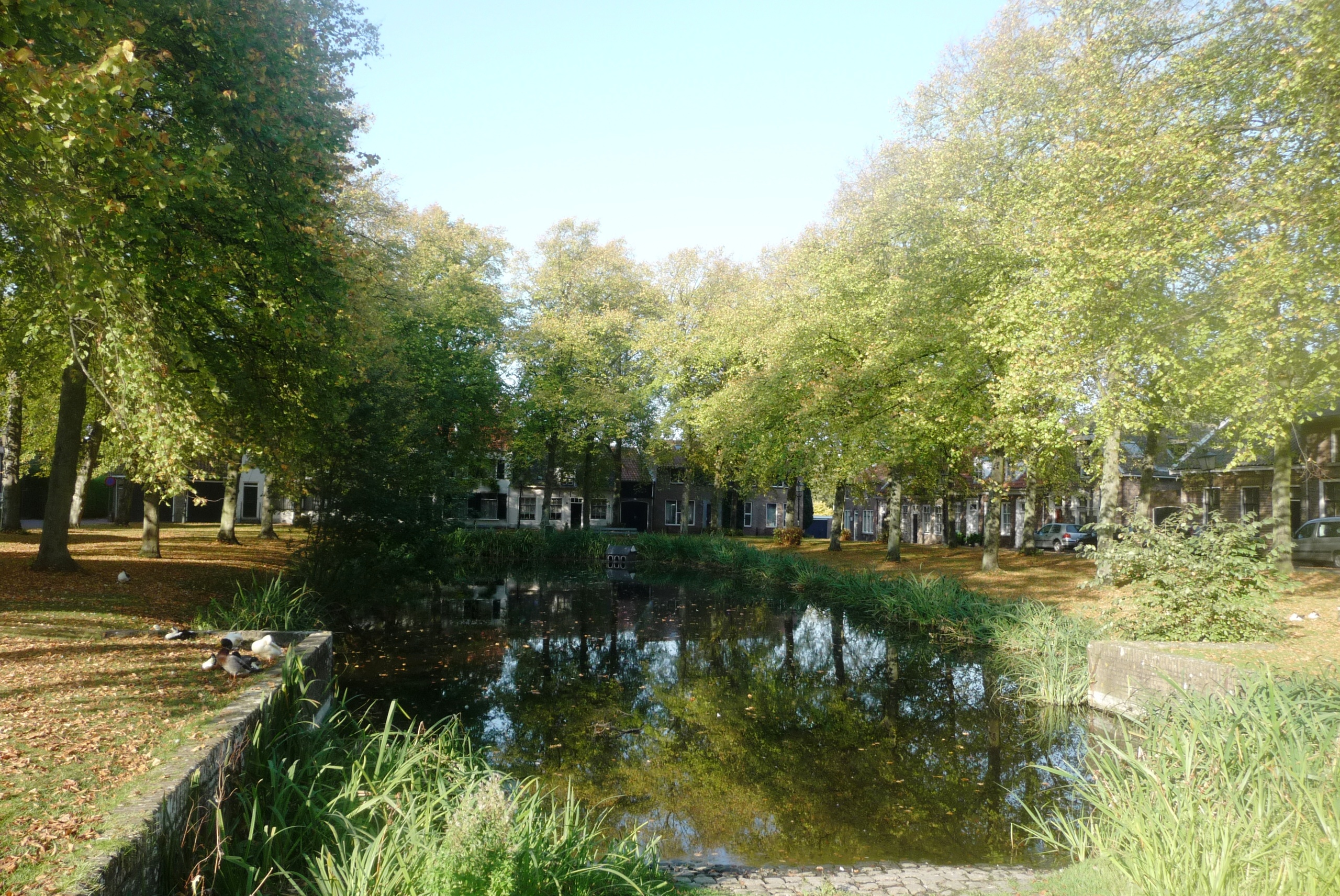

- Coat of arms

- Location in the province of Zeeland in the Netherlands Kloetinge (Netherlands)
- Coordinates: 51°29′55″N 3°54′48″E
- Country: Netherlands
- Province: Zeeland
- Municipality: Goes

Area
  - Total: 7.77 km^{2} (3.00 sq mi)
- Elevation: 0.5 m (1.6 ft)

Population (2021)
  - Total: 3,440
  - Density: 443/km^{2} (1,150/sq mi)
- Time zone: UTC+1 (CET)
  - Summer (DST): UTC+2 (CEST)
- Postal code: 4481
- Dialing code: 0113

Kloetinge is a village in the Dutch province of Zeeland. It is located in the municipality of Goes, on the eastern side of the city.

== History ==
The village was first mentioned in 1216 as Clotinge, and means "settlement with a height". Kloetinge is a circular village which developed on a terp (artificial living hill) with an adjacent market square with drinking well for cattle. The motte-and-bailey castle of the Lords of Kloetinge was located on the eastern side of the market. The original village was destroyed in 1572 by the Geuzen.

The Dutch Reformed church was built between 1275 and 1300 to replace a wooden church. The church was enlarged and modified several times. The tower was restored in 1956, and the church between 1969 and 1973. The former town hall and clergy house were built in 1881 and designed by the same architect. In 1968, the clergy house was incorporated into the town hall. In 1984, the building was converted into an apartment building.

The grist mill Oostmolen was built in 1704. Until the 1960s, it formed a single building with the residential home of the miller. In 1998, the wind mill became owned by a foundation, and is regularly in service.

Kloetinge was home to 696 people in 1840. In 1927, a railway station was built on the Goes to Wemeldinge railway. It closed in 1934. Kloetinge was a separate municipality until 1970, when it was merged with Goes.

== Sports ==
Kloetinge is home to football club VV Kloetinge.

== Gallery ==
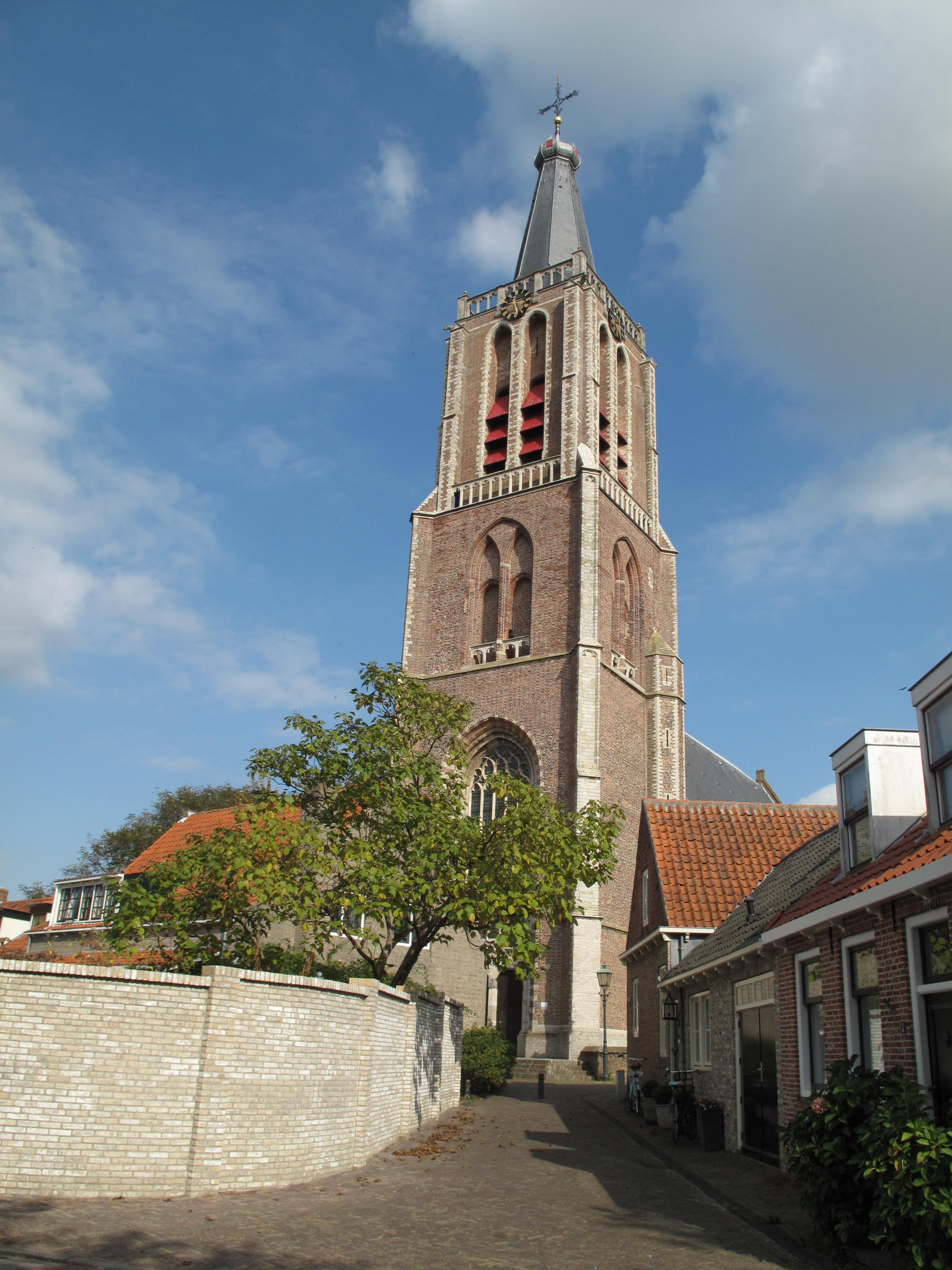
Gertrudis church, front (west)

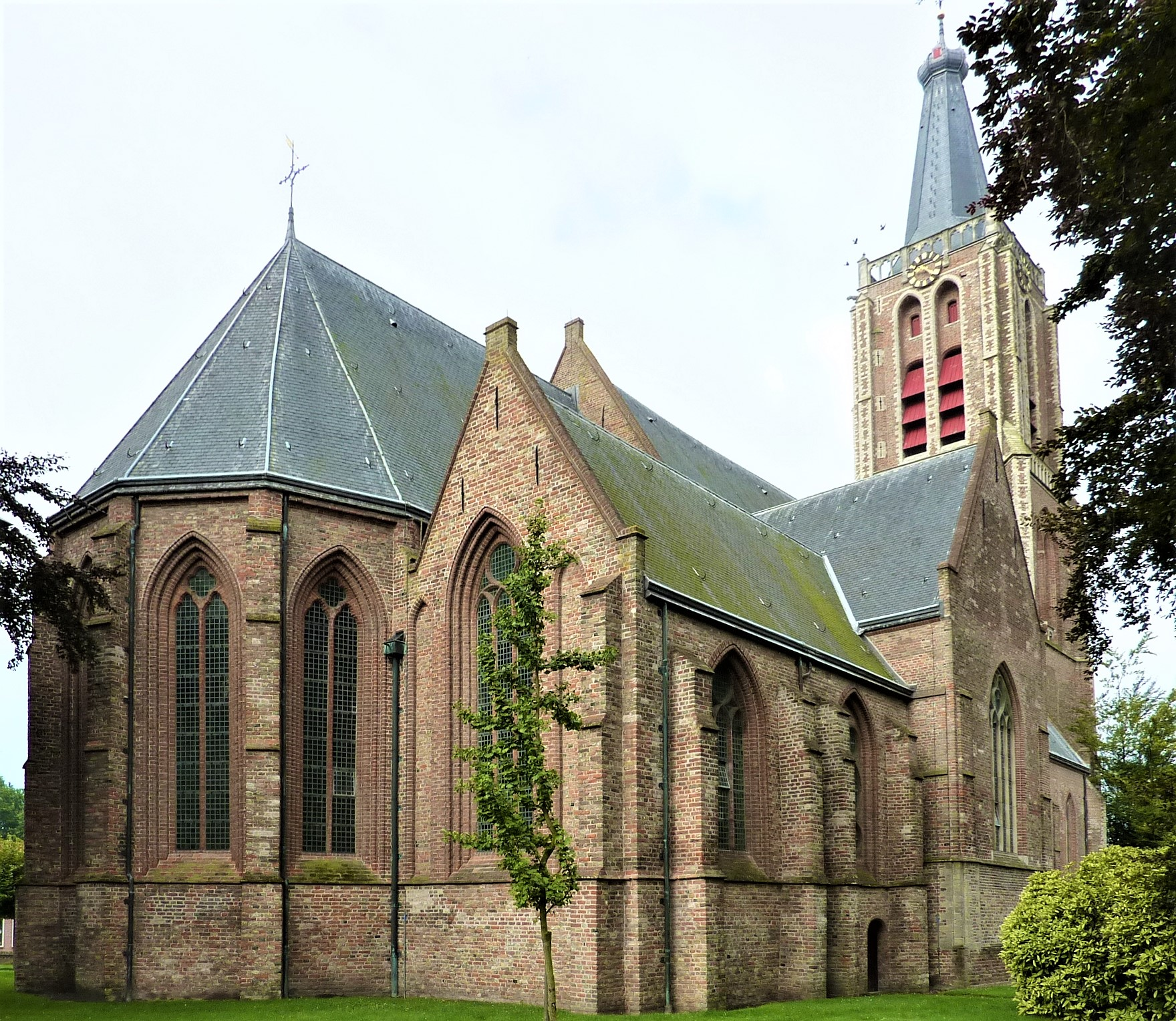
Gertrudis church

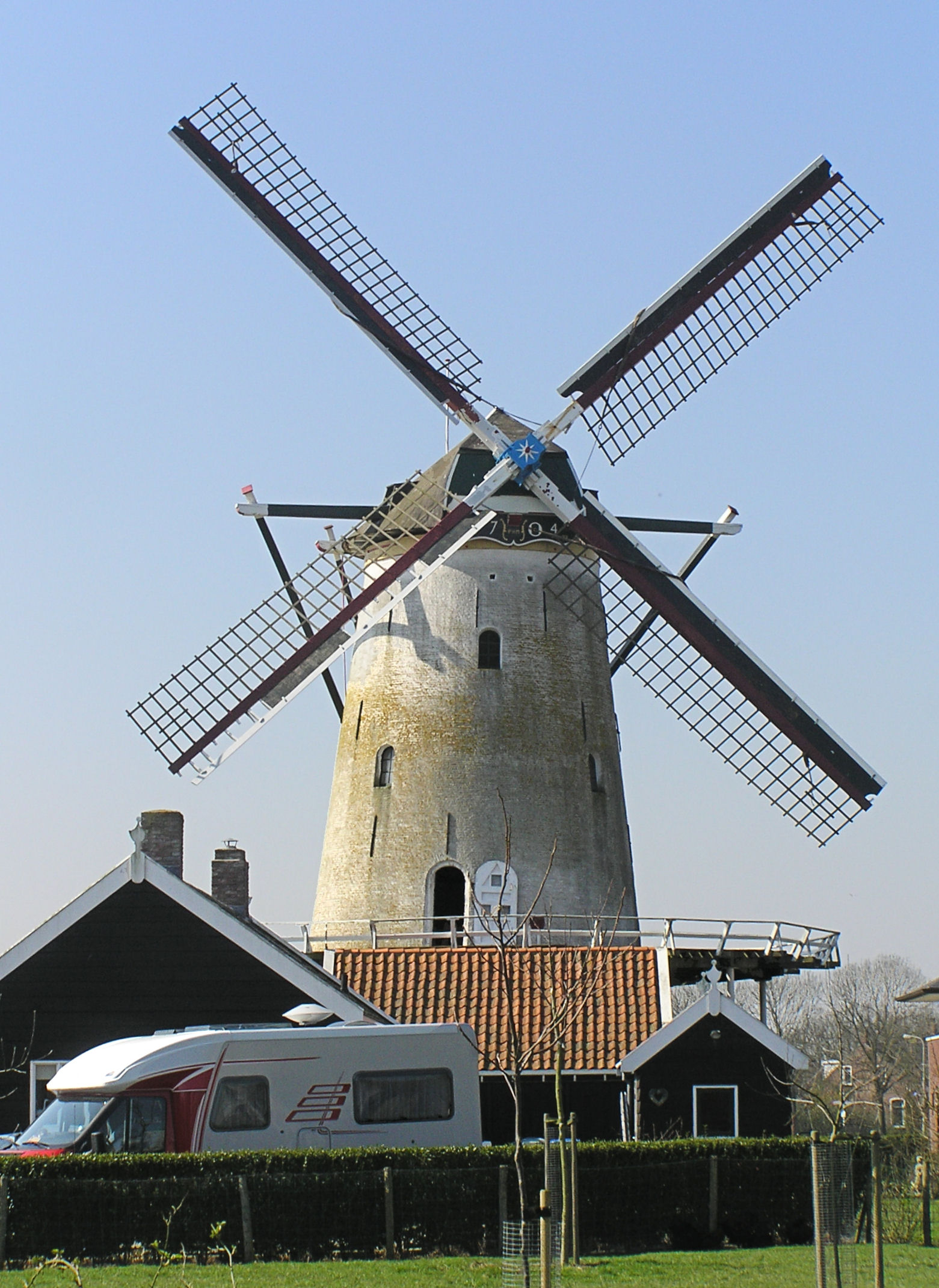
The Kloetinge windmill

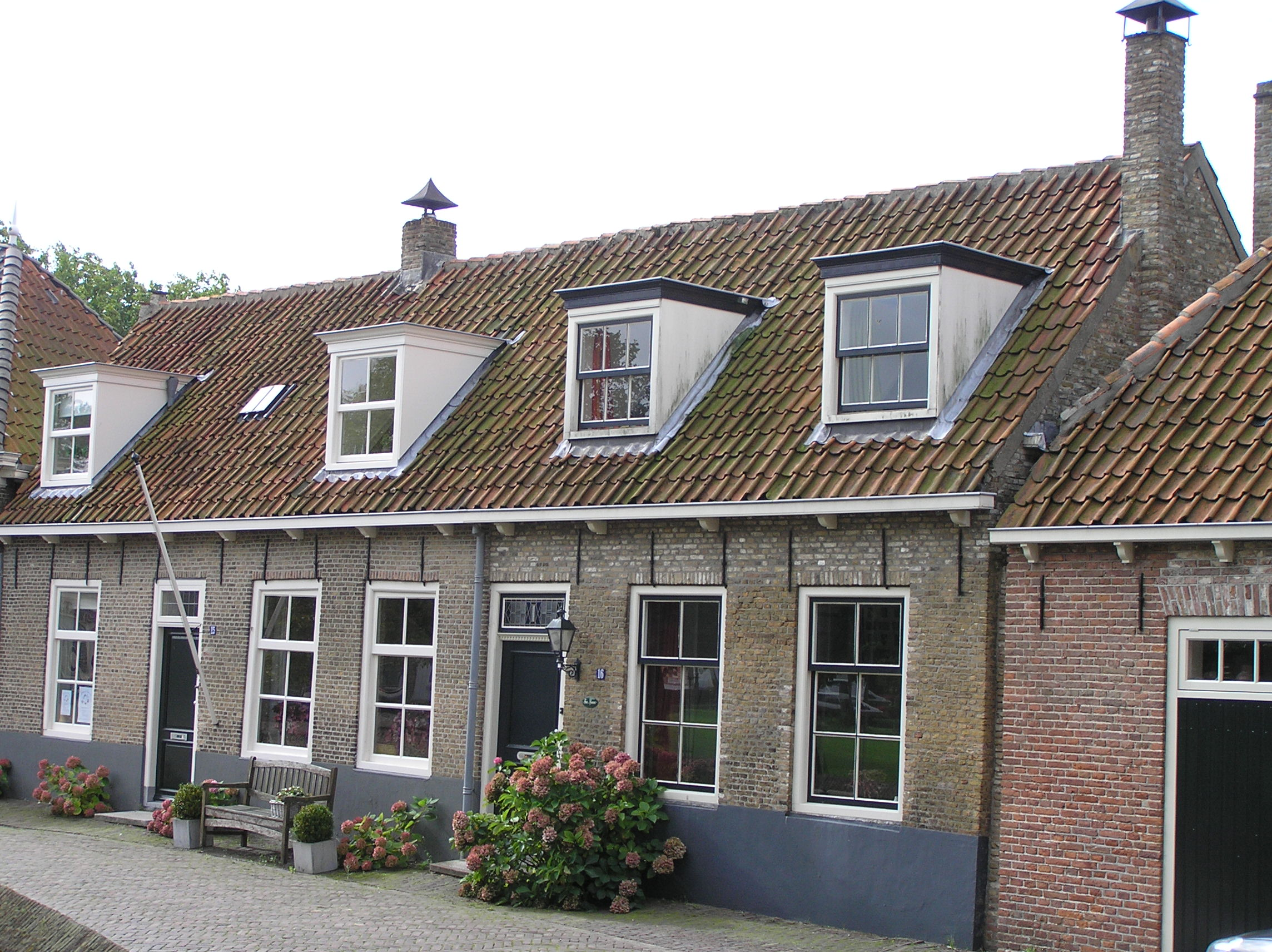
Houses in Kloetinge
