= VV Kloetinge =

Association football club in Zeeland, Netherlands

- Full name: Voetbalvereniging Kloetinge
- Founded: 28 November 1931; 94 years ago
- Ground: Wesselopark, Kloetinge
- Capacity: 1,500
- Chairman: Jan-Kees de Bruine
- Manager: Vincent de Klerk
- League: Tweede Divisie
- 2025–26: Derde Divisie B, 1st of 18 (promoted)
- Website: http://www.vvkloetinge.nl/
Home colours	Away colours

Voetbalvereniging Kloetinge is a football club based in Kloetinge, Zeeland, Netherlands. It plays its home matches at the Wesselopark.

== History ==
The club was founded in 1931 under the name Unitas. The name was changed to Kloetinge in 1952. Some years later, the club colours were changed from blue and black to green and white. Kloetinge is a stable Saturday Eerste Klasse between 2015 and 2022. In 2022, it won an Eerste Klasse section championship and promoted to the Vierde Divisie. In 2023 it promoted to the Derde Divisie, the fourth tier of the Dutch football league system, through 2022–23 Vierde Divisie playoffs.

== Current squad ==
As of 25 October 2026

Note: Flags indicate national team as defined under FIFA eligibility rules; some limited exceptions apply. Players may hold more than one non-FIFA nationality.

No.	Pos.	Nation	Player
1	GK	NED	Teun van Remortel
2	DF	NED	Corijn Kokkeel
3	DF	NED	Koen Plank
4	DF	NED	Jeffrey Theunisse
5	DF	NED	Raphael Zerbib
6	MF	NED	Valentijn van Keulen
7	FW	NED	Jefry Dijkstra
8	DF	NED	Dook van den Berg
9	FW	NED	Ruben de Jager
10	MF	ARU	Gianni Vandepitte
11	FW	NED	Aart de Waal
12	DF	NED	Klaas van Hecke
14	MF	MAR	Yassine Azzagari

No.	Pos.	Nation	Player
15	DF	NED	Jonah Bijvank
16	DF	NED	Timo Lijbers
17	FW	NED	Erwin Franse
18	DF	NED	Wout Neelen
20	FW	NED	Steve Schalkwijk
21	FW	NED	Daniël Wissel
22	DF	NED	Rogier van Gogh
23	FW	NED	Joël van Herwijnen
24	MF	NED	Tomas Guitart van Hees
29	DF	NED	Julius Bliek
30	GK	NED	Mick Hofman
31	GK	ARU	Matthew Lentink
37	FW	NED	Luuk Admiraal

== Managers ==
- Jurriaan van Poelje (2020s)
- Rogier Veenstra (2024–2026)
- Roy Hendriksen (2026)
- Vincent de Klerk (2026–present)
