= Roy Hendriksen =

Dutch footballer, coach, and manager

Personal information
- Full name: Roy Pierre Vernond Hendriksen
- Date of birth: 21 January 1969 (age 57)
- Place of birth: Goirle, Netherlands
- Height: 1.86 m (6 ft 1 in)
- Position: Midfielder

Youth career
- Vlissingen
- MV & AV Middelburg
- RBC

Senior career*
Years	Team	Apps	(Gls)
1991–1994	RBC	88	(11)
1994	Hoek		
1994–1995	Eindhoven	48	(23)
1996–1999	Cambuur	85	(6)
1999–2002	Veendam	90	(18)
2002–2005	Helmond Sport	97	(30)
2006	Hoek		
2006–2007	Helmond Sport	32	(3)
Total		440	(91)

Managerial career
- 2007–2010: Zeelandia Middelburg
- 2010–2011: Vlissingen
- 2016–2018: Helmond Sport
- 2026: Kloetinge
- * Club domestic league appearances and goals

Roy Pierre Vernond Hendriksen (born 21 January 1969) is a Dutch professional football manager, coach and former player. During his 16-year playing career he played Eredivisie football with SC Cambuur, before retiring in 2007 and entering management with Zeelandia Middelburg. He later served as assistant manager at RKC, NEC, Brentford, Sporting CP, Al Jazira and Dewa United.

== Playing career ==
A midfielder, Hendriksen was raised in Middelburg and spent the majority of his 16-year professional career in the Eerste Divisie in the Netherlands, most notably with Helmond Sport, BV Veendam and RBC Roosendaal. He helped SC Cambuur to promotion from the Eerste Divisie in the 1997–98 season and made 27 Eredivisie appearances the following year. He retired in 2007 after a second spell with Helmond Sport.

== Managerial career ==
=== Zeelandia Middleburg ===
Hendriksen began his managerial career in 2007 with Derde Klasse side Zeelandia Middelburg. He took the club to the playoff semi-finals in his debut season, before suffering relegation to the Vierde Klasse in the 2008–09 season. He departed the club in 2010. He returned on a part-time consultancy basis during the 2011–12 season.

=== VC Vlissingen ===
Hendriksen was appointed manager at Eerste Klasse side VC Vlissingen in 2010, the club where he began his career as a player. He managed a sixth-place finish with the financially stricken club and departed at the end of the 2010–11 season. He was nominated for the Coach of the Year award at the 2011 Zeeland Football Awards.

=== Helmond Sport ===
On 6 February 2016 it was announced that Hendriksen would return to Helmond Sport (his final club as a player) as head coach on a two-year contract from the beginning of the 2016–17 season. After a mid-table finish at the end of the 2016–17 Eerste Divisie season, a second-from-bottom finish in 2017–18 led to the club's decision to allow Hendriksen's contract to expire.

=== VV Kloetinge ===
In early July 2026, Hendriksen was appointed head coach of Tweede Divisie club VV Kloetinge. He presided over one competitive match before his departure in mid-August.

== Coaching career ==
=== RKC Waalwijk ===
In January 2011, Hendriksen was appointed as Ruud Brood's assistant at Eerste Divisie club RKC Waalwijk on a contract until the end of the 2010–11 season. A run of 14 wins from 17 matches saw Waalwijk win promotion to the Eredivisie as champions at the end of the season. He signed a new contract in May 2011. Hendriksen assisted Brood to a 9th-place finish and qualification to the Europa League promotion playoffs in the 2011–12 season, but they were denied a place in Europe after a 5–2 aggregate defeat to Vitesse Arnhem in the final. Brood departed Waalwijk and was replaced by Erwin Koeman as manager in the summer of 2012, who retained Hendriksen as his assistant. Waalwijk narrowly missed relegation to the Eerste Divisie in the 2012–13 season and were relegated the following year after a 4–2 aggregate defeat to S.B.V. Excelsior in the relegation playoffs. Hendriksen turned down the offer of a new three-year contract and left the club in May 2014.

=== N.E.C. ===
Hendriksen reunited with Ruud Brood at Eerste Divisie club N.E.C. in June 2014. In a successful 2014–15 season, the pair sent N.E.C. to the Eredivisie as champions. Hendriksen left the club at the end of the campaign.

=== Brentford ===
On 1 June 2015, Hendriksen was announced as assistant to Marinus Dijkhuizen at English Championship club Brentford. A number of departures and a crippling injury list saw Brentford sitting in 19th position after eight league matches, which led to Dijkhuizen and Hendriksen being removed from their positions on 28 September 2015.

=== Sporting CP ===
On 12 November 2018, Hendriksen joined Portuguese Primeira Liga club Sporting CP as assistant to manager Marcel Keizer. He was sacked, along with Keizer, in September 2019.

=== Al Jazira ===
On 13 October 2019, Hendriksen joined UAE Pro League club Al Jazira as assistant to manager Marcel Keizer. Owing to a suspension suffered by Keizer, Hendriksen presided over a 1–0 win over Al Urooba in September 2021.

=== Dewa United ===
On 2 February 2025, Hendriksen joined Indonesian Liga 1 club Dewa United as assistant to manager Jan Olde Riekerink. Both departed their roles in July 2026.

== Career statistics ==
Appearances and goals by club, season and competition
Club	Season	League			National Cup		Total	
Club	Season	Division	Apps	Goals	Apps	Goals	Apps	Goals
SC Cambuur	1998–99	Eredivisie	27	1	4	0	31	1
BV Veendam	1999–00	Eerste Divisie	31	4	5	3	36	7
BV Veendam	2000–01	Eerste Divisie	28	4	0	0	28	4
BV Veendam	2001–02	Eerste Divisie	31	10	1	0	32	10
BV Veendam	Total		90	18	6	3	96	21
Helmond Sport	2002–03	Eerste Divisie	31	14	0	0	31	14
Helmond Sport	2003–04	Eerste Divisie	34	9	0	0	34	9
Helmond Sport	2004–05	Eerste Divisie	37	6	0	0	37	6
Helmond Sport	Total		102	29	0	0	102	29
Helmond Sport	2005–06	Eerste Divisie	8	1	0	0	8	1
Helmond Sport	2006–07	Eerste Divisie	32	3	0	0	32	3
Helmond Sport	Total		142	33	0	0	142	33
Career total			259	52	10	3	269	55

== Honours ==
SC Cambuur

- Eerste Divisie promotion playoff: 1997–98

== External link ==
- Roy Hendriksen at Eersterat (in Dutch)
