= Achille Vaarnold =

Dutch footballer

Personal information
- Date of birth: 26 January 1996 (age 30)
- Place of birth: Paramaribo, Suriname
- Height: 1.80 m (5 ft 11 in)
- Position: Winger

Team information
- Current team: De Volewijckers

Youth career
- AZ

Senior career*
Years	Team	Apps	(Gls)
2015–2016	AZ	1	(0)
2017–2019	Almere City	20	(0)
2017–2019	Jong Almere City	36	(5)
2021–	De Volewijckers	0	(0)
- * Club domestic league appearances and goals as of 19 May 2019

Achille Vaarnold (born 26 January 1996) is a Dutch professional footballer who plays as a winger for De Volewijckers.
