= Jan Vreman =

Dutch footballer and manager of Cape Town City

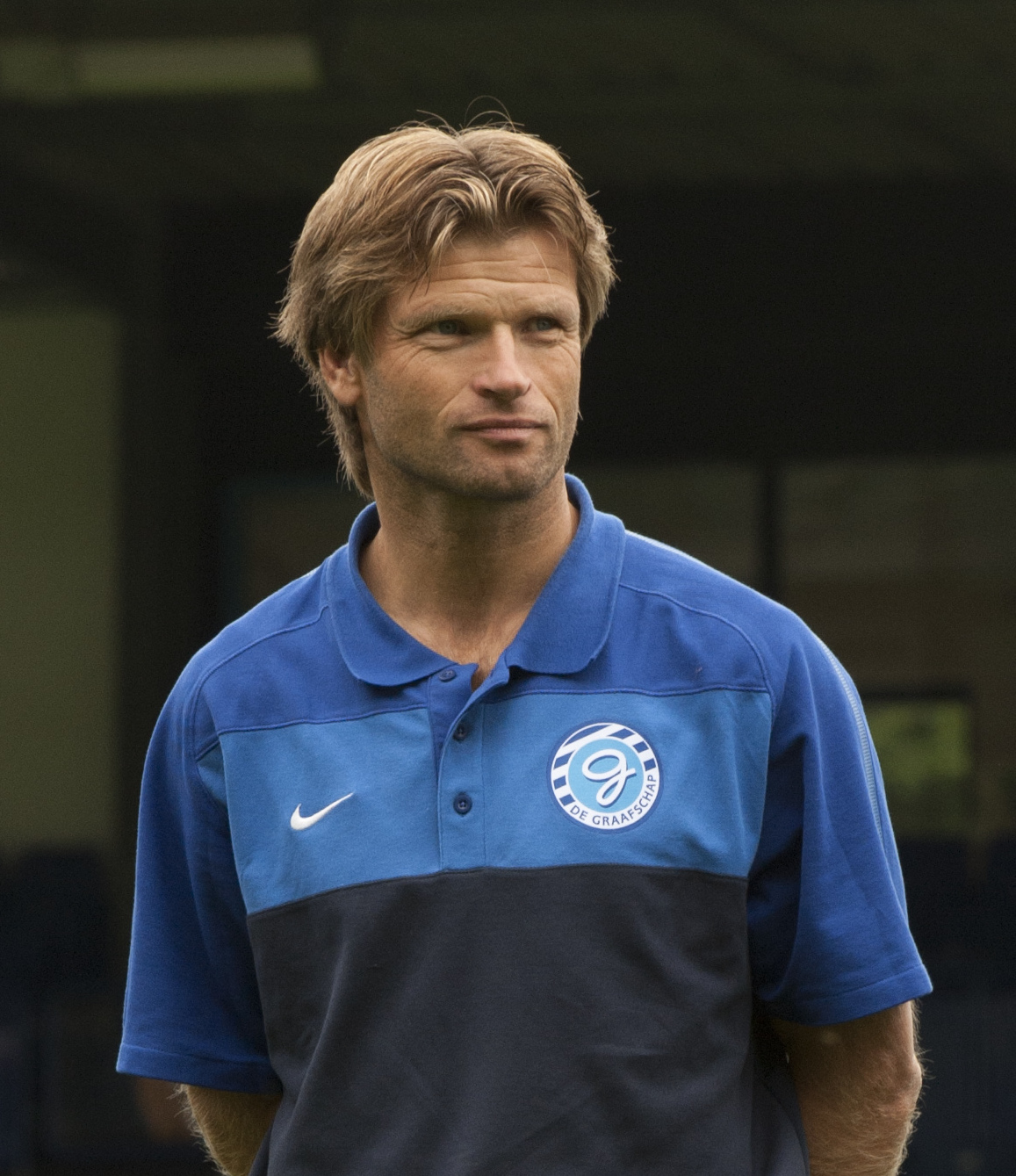
- Jan Vreman in 2011

Personal information
- Date of birth: 17 September 1965 (age 61)
- Place of birth: Winterswijk, Netherlands
- Height: 1.81 m (5 ft 11 1/2 in)
- Position: Defender

Youth career
- De Graafschap

Senior career*
Years	Team	Apps	(Gls)
1985–2003	De Graafschap	375	(11)

Managerial career
- 2003–2005: De Graafschap (youth)
- 2006–2014: De Graafschap (assistant manager)
- 2014: De Graafschap (interim manager)
- 2014–2016: De Graafschap
- 2017–2022: Jong De Graafschap
- 2022: De Graafschap (interim manager)
- 2022–2023: Jong De Graafschap
- 2023–2024: De Graafschap
- 2025–2026: Cape Town City
- * Club domestic league appearances and goals

Jan Vreman (born 17 September 1965) is a Dutch football manager and former player, who was most recently the manager of National First Division club Cape Town City.

== Playing career ==
Vreman spent his entire playing career with Dutch football club De Graafschap. His stay with the club earned him the nickname Mister De Graafschap.

== Managerial career ==
=== De Graafschap ===
On 3 January 2014, Vreman became interim manager of De Graafschap as a replacement for Pieter Huistra. On 25 March 2014, De Graafschap appointed Vreman as their permanent manager.

In his first full season in charge, Vreman guided De Graafschap to promotion to the Eredivisie after beating Almere City, Go Ahead Eagles and FC Volendam in the promotion/relegation play-offs.

=== Cape Town City ===
On 14 July 2025, Vreman was announced as manager of National First Division club Cape Town City, leaving De Graafschap for the first time in his career.Cape Town City sacked Vreman after he failed to secure promotion from the National First Division
