= De Graafschap =

Dutch football club

- Full name: Vereniging Betaald Voetbal; De Graafschap
- Nickname: Superboeren (Super Farmers)
- Founded: 1 February 1954; 72 years ago
- Ground: De Vijverberg; Doetinchem
- Capacity: 12,600
- Chairman: Mart de Kruif
- Head coach: Thomas Duivenvoorden
- League: Eerste Divisie
- 2025–26: Eerste Divisie, 4th of 20
- Website: degraafschap.nl
| Home colours | Away colours |

Vereniging Betaald Voetbal De Graafschap (Dutch: [vəˈreːnɪɣɪŋ bəˈtaːlt ˈvutbɑl də ˈɣraːfsxɑp]), simply known as De Graafschap ([də ˈɣraːfsxɑp]), is a professional association football club based in Doetinchem, Netherlands. The team competes in the Eerste Divisie, the second level of the Dutch football league system.

Founded on 1 February 1954, the club has played its home games at De Vijverberg since their foundation. Translated from Dutch, the club name means "The County", while its fans are affectionately referred to as Superboeren ("Super Farmers"). The club dons blue and white hooped shirts paired with white shorts and blue socks.

Though modest in stature compared to some European counterparts, De Graafschap has maintained a consistent presence in the top-tier Eredivisie, albeit without clinching any major trophies. Despite this, the club boasts a substantial stadium and a dedicated fan base, particularly notable within the second-tier Eerste Divisie. Over time, the club has cultivated heated rivalries, notably with Vitesse. However, circumstances have also fueled a burgeoning rivalry with Go Ahead Eagles.

== History ==
=== Foundation ===
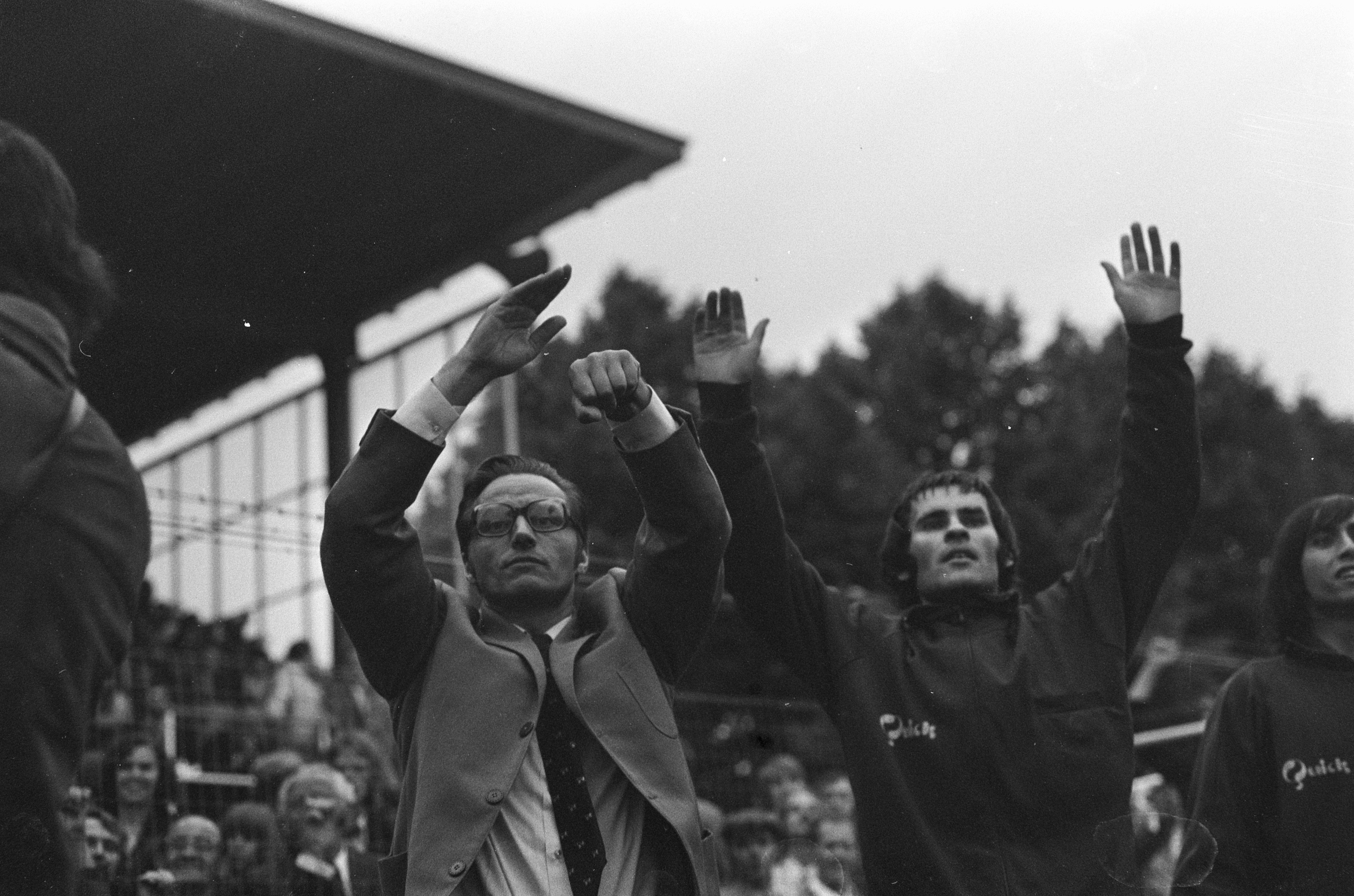
Under the leadership of Piet de Visser, the club was promoted to the Eredivisie for the first time in 1973.

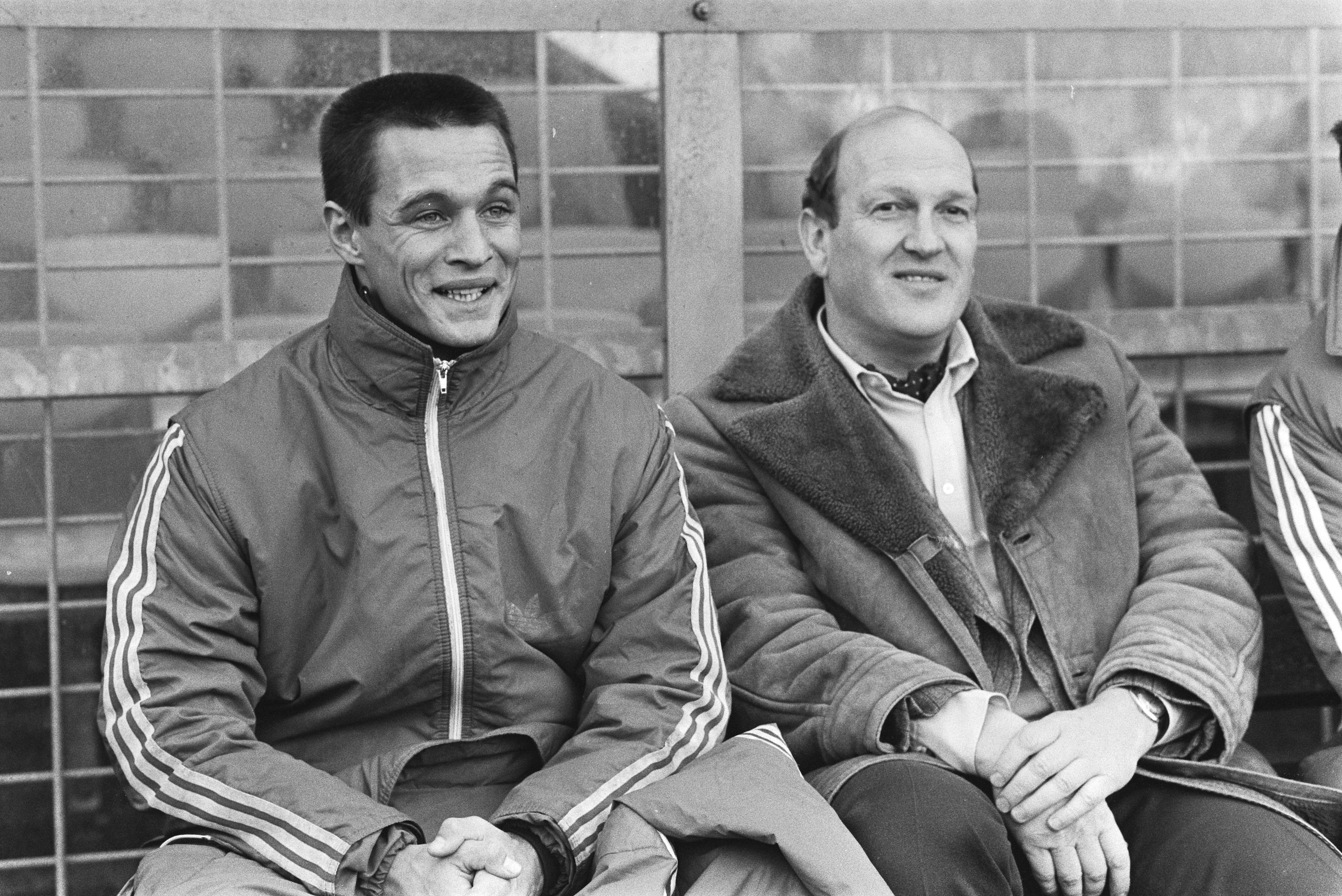
In the 1990–91 season, the club, under the management of Simon Kistemaker (right), became undefeated champions of the Eerste Divisie.

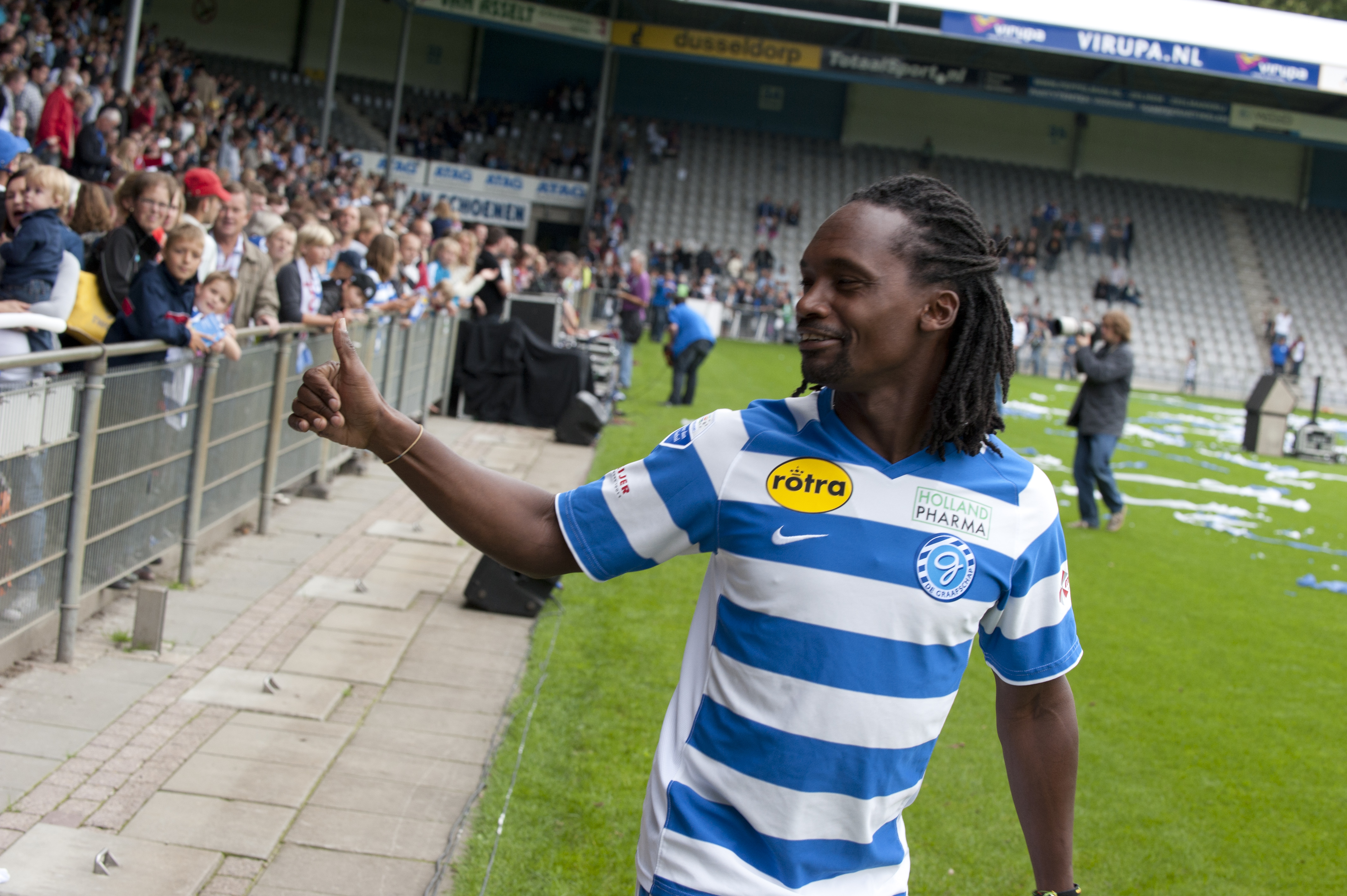
Between 1995 and 2003, De Graafschap enjoyed its longest uninterrupted spell in the Eredivisie.

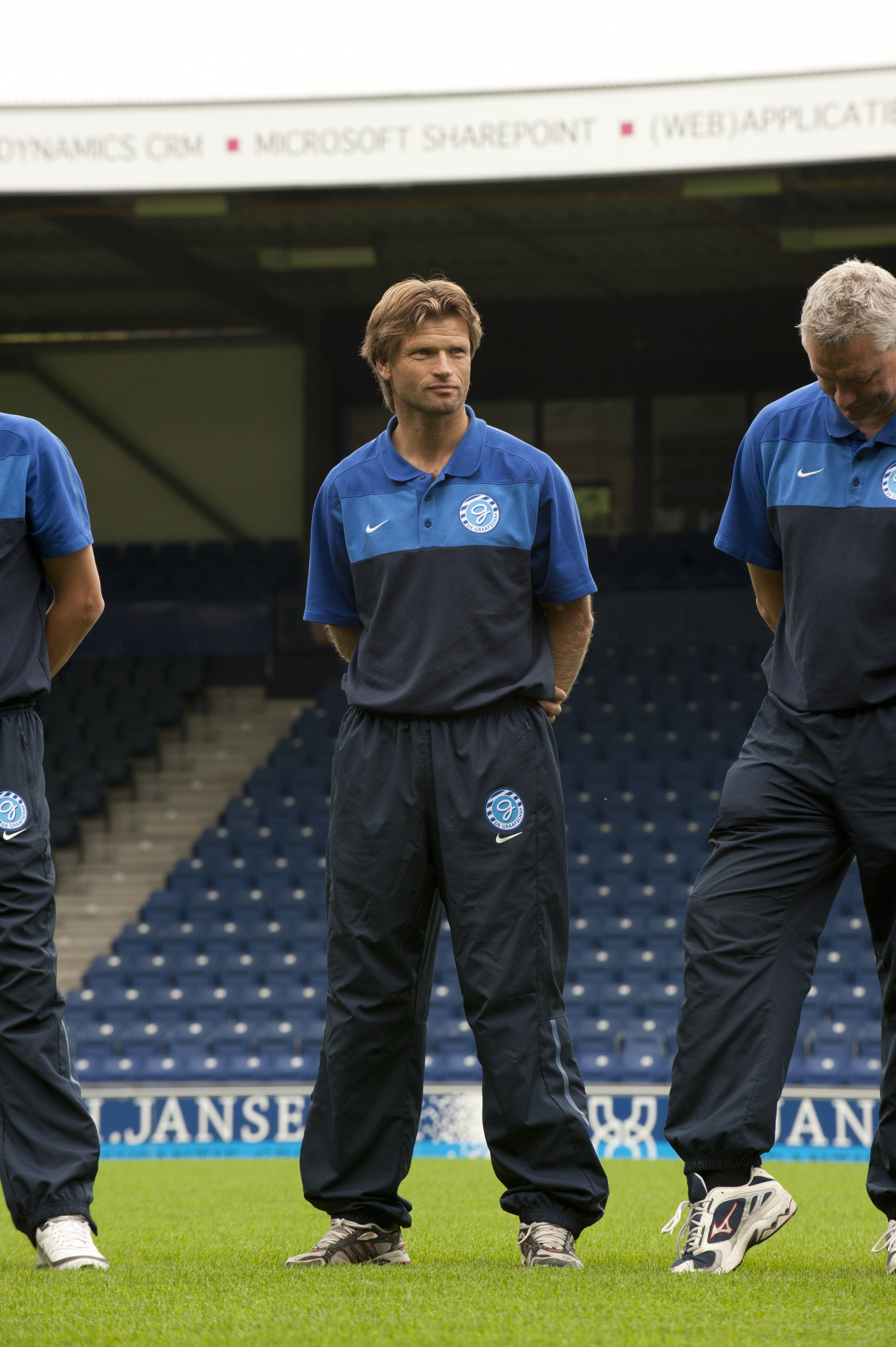
In 2015, Jan Vreman, affectionately known as "Mister De Graafschap," assumed the role as the club's manager.

Following the Watersnoodwedstrijd (Flood Disaster Match), a benefit game featuring Dutch foreign professionals, held at the Parc des Princes in front of 40,000 spectators against France one month after the devastating North Sea flood of 1953, the Royal Dutch Football Association (KNVB)'s rejection of professional football prompted the establishment of the wilde bond (wild federation) Nederlandse Beroeps Voetbal Bond (NBVB) to advocate for its introduction. New clubs were founded to support this initiative. Under the guidance of Amsterdam native Johan Roodbergen, the professional football club De Graafschap was established in Doetinchem on 1 February 1954. The name was chosen to represent the Oost-Gelderland region known as De Graafschap, which encompasses Doetinchem, formerly known as Graafschap Zutphen (County of Zutphen; until 1795 known as the Quarter of Zutphen), and now recognised as the Achterhoek. The club adopted a uniform featuring horizontally striped blue and white shirts, white shorts, and horizontally striped blue and white socks.

Prior to this initiative, professional football had never been played in Doetinchem. Following the merger of the NBVB and KNVB, De Graafschap joined the professional league. To facilitate this transition, the club merged with VV Oosseld (founded in 1922, abbreviated as VVO) to establish the professional association De Graafschap after initial discussions about merging all clubs around Doetinchem fell through. The clubs completed the 1954–55 season independently, after which the merger was formalised, with Oosseld becoming the amateur department of De Graafschap. Despite attempts to involve VV Doetinchem in the merger, the Doetinchem members rejected the proposal. De Graafschap played their first competitive match on 4 September 1954, drawing 1–1 with Fortuna '54 featuring players such as Frans de Munck, Cor van der Hart en Jan Notermans.

De Graafschap stands as the only team from the NBVB that persists as an independent professional club. Founder Roodbergen, after whom a grandstand was named, never witnessed 'his' De Graafschap play due to his severe visual impairment. The team's home matches were held at the newly constructed stadium De Vijverberg.

=== First promotion (1972–1989) ===
Under the leadership of head coach Piet de Visser and with Guus Hiddink as a key player, De Graafschap clinched the first promotion playoff win in Dutch football during the 1972–73 season. Their debut season in the Eredivisie proved successful, securing a fourteenth-place finish highlighted by a notable 1–0 home victory over Ajax. The following two seasons saw the team maintain its position in the top flight. However, in the 1976–77 season, De Graafschap finished bottom, marking the first of nine relegations throughout the club's history, with equally as many promotions.

In the 1980–81 Eerste Divisie season, De Graafschap found themselves out of contention for top spots in the league. Their striker, Boudewijn de Geer, was unpopular among supporters that season, and faced jeers from the crowd during a crucial promotion playoff match against Den Bosch. However, sentiments shifted dramatically when De Geer scored twice, propelling De Graafschap back into the Eredivisie. Despite this triumph, the club finished bottom in the subsequent season, resulting in their second ever relegation.

A motto in the Achterhooks dialect, embraced by the club and its supporters, encapsulates De Graafschap's sporting history: "Wi-j komt altied weer terug" ("We always come back"). This phrase reflects the club's recurrent pattern of fluctuating between divisions, highlighting its resilience over the years.

=== Invincibles and eight years Eredivisie (1990–2003) ===
In the 1990–91 season, under the management of Simon Kistemaker, De Graafschap achieved an undefeated championship title in the Eerste Divisie. However, their Eredivisie stay lasted only one season as they were immediately relegated the following year.

Between 1995 and 2003, De Graafschap enjoyed its lengthiest unbroken tenure in the Eredivisie. Under Fritz Korbach's management in 1997, the club achieved its highest-ever league finish, securing eighth place. Subsequently, the club's performance began to decline, and in 2003, under the guidance of Peter Bosz, De Graafschap suffered relegation back to the Eerste Divisie after an eight-year spell in the top flight.

=== Up and downs (2004–present) ===
De Graafschap's rollercoaster ride between divisions culminated in a thrilling promotion to the Eredivisie, despite finishing sixth in the 2003–04 season of the Eerste Divisie. This achievement was made possible by a dramatic late goal from Michael van der Kruis during an away match against Excelsior at Woudestein. This crucial goal propelled them past Heracles Almelo in the standings, securing a last-minute promotion. However, a year later, they faced relegation back to the Eerste Divisie after a seventeenth-place finish in the Eredivisie.

In 2007, they dominated the Eerste Divisie under head coach Jan de Jonge with players such as Berry Powel, Jhon van Beukering, and Lasse Schöne, clinching the title, and briefly surprised in the Eredivisie the following season, albeit barely staying up through relegation playoffs after a poor second half to the season. However, in the 2008–09 season, they were relegated after a loss to RKC Waalwijk in the relegation play-offs. Again, they won the second-tier title in the 2009–10 season in convincing fashion under head coach and former player Darije Kalezić. He would subsequently lead them to one of their best Eredivisie performances in years, placing fourteenth in 2011, only losing three out of 17 home games. In 2012, however, they suffered relegation once again through the playoffs.

In the 2015–16 Eredivisie season, De Graafschap were once again relegated through playoffs after finishing seventeenth but not before drawing 1–1 against Ajax on the final day of the season, denying Ajax the championship. In 2018, the club gained promotion again by winning the promotion playoffs, beating Almere City FC in the playoffs finals. They were relegated in 2019, and the next season ended in further heartbreak on 24 April 2020 as they were denied a possible promotion back to the top flight due to the COVID-19 pandemic forcing the Eredivisie to declare their season void with no promotion or relegation.

Late in the 2020–21 season, De Graafschap were in control of their promotion hopes, only needing one win in their final two games to secure promotion. However, they were held to a 1–1 draw, followed by a goalless draw versus Helmond Sport, denying them an automatic promotion spot and forcing them to go through the promotion playoffs. De Graafschap crashed out of the playoffs in the first round after a 3–2 home loss to Roda JC, thus meaning that they would remain in the Eerste Divisie.

Despite experiencing multiple relegations, including seventeenth-place finishes and relegation playoffs in 2005, 2009, 2012, 2016, and 2019, De Graafschap has managed to avoid finishing at the bottom of the Eredivisie since 2003.

== Honours ==
- Eerste Divisie
  - Winner: 1991, 2007, 2010
- Tweede Divisie
  - Winner: 1969
- Promoted to Eredivisie
  - Promotion: 1973, 1981, 1995, 2004, 2015, 2018
- Promoted to Eerste Divisie
  - Promotion: 1966

== Results ==
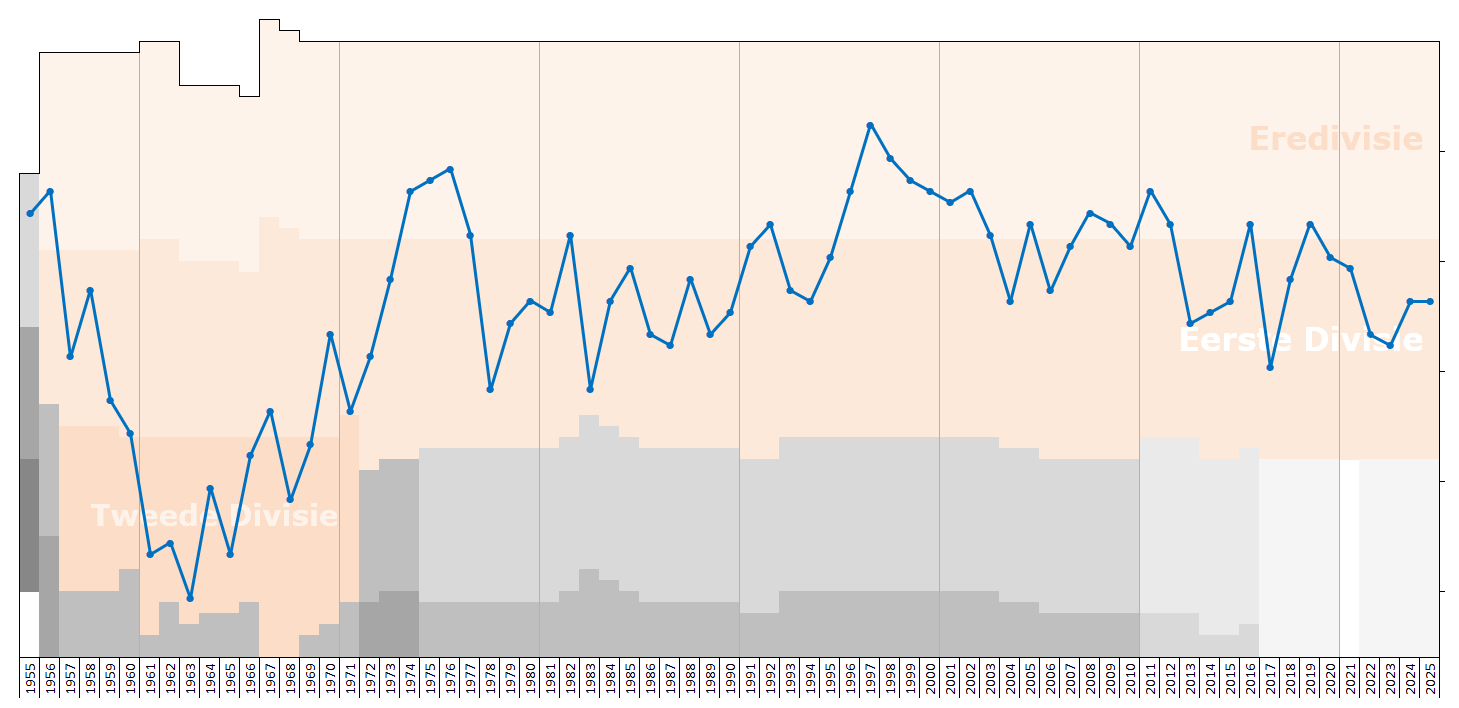
Historical chart of league performance

Below is a table with De Graafschap's domestic results since the introduction of the Eredivisie in 1956.

Domestic results since 1956
| Domestic league | League result | Qualification to | KNVB Cup season | Cup result |
|---|---|---|---|---|
| 2025–26 Eerste Divisie | 4th | promotion/relegation play-offs: no promotion | 2025–26 | First round |
| 2024–25 Eerste Divisie | 6th | – | 2024–25 | Round of 16 |
| 2023–24 Eerste Divisie | 6th | – | 2023–24 | Second round |
| 2022–23 Eerste Divisie | 10th | – | 2022–23 | Quarter-finals |
| 2021–22 Eerste Divisie | 9th | promotion/relegation play-offs: no promotion | 2021–22 | First round |
| 2020–21 Eerste Divisie | 3rd | promotion/relegation play-offs: no promotion | 2020–21 | Second round |
| 2019–20 Eerste Divisie | 2nd | Season abandoned due to COVID-19 pandemic | 2019–20 | First round |
| 2018–19 Eredivisie | 17th | Eerste Divisie (losing promo./releg. play-offs) | 2018–19 | Second round |
| 2017–18 Eerste Divisie | 4th | Eredivisie (winning promo./releg. play-offs) | 2017–18 | First round |
| 2016–17 Eerste Divisie | 12th | – | 2016–17 | First round |
| 2015–16 Eredivisie | 17th | Eerste Divisie (losing promo./releg. play-offs) | 2015–16 | Second round |
| 2014–15 Eerste Divisie | 6th | Eredivisie (winning promo./releg. play-offs) | 2014–15 | Second round |
| 2013–14 Eerste Divisie | 7th | promotion/relegation play-offs: no promotion | 2013–14 | Round of 16 |
| 2012–13 Eerste Divisie | 8th | promotion/relegation play-offs: no promotion | 2012–13 | Third round |
| 2011–12 Eredivisie | 17th | Eerste Divisie (losing promo./releg. play-offs) | 2011–12 | Quarter-finals |
| 2010–11 Eredivisie | 14th | – | 2010–11 | Third round |
| 2009–10 Eerste Divisie | 1st | Eredivisie (promotion) | 2009–10 | Second round |
| 2008–09 Eredivisie | 17th | Eerste Divisie (losing promo./releg. play-offs) | 2008–09 | Quarter-finals |
| 2007–08 Eredivisie | 16th | – (surviving promotion/relegation play-offs) | 2007–08 | Third round |
| 2006–07 Eerste Divisie | 1st | Eredivisie (promotion) | 2006–07 | Round of 16 |
| 2005–06 Eerste Divisie | 5th | promotion/relegation play-offs: no promotion | 2005–06 | Disqualified |
| 2004–05 Eredivisie | 17th | Eerste Divisie (losing promo./releg. play-offs) | 2004–05 | Second round |
| 2003–04 Eerste Divisie | 6th | Eredivisie (winning promotion/releg. play-offs) | 2003–04 | Second round |
| 2002–03 Eredivisie | 18th | Eerste Divisie (relegation) | 2002–03 | Round of 16 |
| 2001–02 Eredivisie | 14th | – | 2001–02 | Third round |
| 2000–01 Eredivisie | 15th | – | 2000–01 | Second round |
| 1999–2000 Eredivisie | 14th | – | 1999–2000 | Second round |
| 1998–99 Eredivisie | 13th | – | 1998–99 | Second round |
| 1997–98 Eredivisie | 11th | – | 1997–98 | Second round |
| 1996–97 Eredivisie | 8th | – | 1996–97 | Round of 16 |
| 1995–96 Eredivisie | 14th | – | 1995–96 | Round of 16 |
| 1994–95 Eerste Divisie | 2nd | Eredivisie (winning promotion/releg. play-offs) | 1994–95 | Second round |
| 1993–94 Eerste Divisie | 6th | promotion/relegation play-offs: no promotion | 1993–94 | Round of 16 |
| 1992–93 Eerste Divisie | 5th | promotion/relegation play-offs: no promotion | 1992–93 | Third round |
| 1991–92 Eredivisie | 17th | Eerste Divisie (relegation) | 1991–92 | Second round |
| 1990–91 Eerste Divisie | 1st | Eredivisie (promotion) | 1990–91 | Round of 16 |
| 1989–90 Eerste Divisie | 7th | – | 1989–90 | First round |
| 1988–89 Eerste Divisie | 9th | – | 1988–89 | First round |
| 1987–88 Eerste Divisie | 4th | promotion/relegation play-offs: no promotion | 1987–88 | Second round |
| 1986–87 Eerste Divisie | 10th | – | 1986–87 | Round of 16 |
| 1985–86 Eerste Divisie | 9th | – | 1985–86 | First round |
| 1984–85 Eerste Divisie | 3rd | promotion/relegation play-offs: no promotion | 1984–85 | Second round |
| 1983–84 Eerste Divisie | 6th | promotion/relegation play-offs: no promotion | 1983–84 | Round of 16 |
| 1982–83 Eerste Divisie | 14th | – | 1982–83 | Round of 16 |
| 1981–82 Eredivisie | 18th | Eerste Divisie (relegation) | 1981–82 | Second round |
| 1980–81 Eerste Divisie | 7th | Eredivisie (winning promotion/releg. play-offs) | 1980–81 | First round |
| 1979–80 Eerste Divisie | 6th | promotion/relegation play-offs: no promotion | 1979–80 | Second round |
| 1978–79 Eerste Divisie | 8th | – | 1978–79 | Round of 16 |
| 1977–78 Eerste Divisie | 14th | – | 1977–78 | First round |
| 1976–77 Eredivisie | 18th | Eerste Divisie (relegation) | 1976–77 | Round of 16 |
| 1975–76 Eredivisie | 12th | – | 1975–76 | Quarter-finals |
| 1974–75 Eredivisie | 13th | – | 1974–75 | Second round |
| 1973–74 Eredivisie | 14th | – | 1973–74 | Second round |
| 1972–73 Eerste Divisie | 4th | Eredivisie (winning promotion/releg. play-offs) | 1972–73 | First round |
| 1971–72 Eerste Divisie | 11th | – | 1971–72 | Did not participate |
| 1970–71 Eerste Divisie | 16th | – | 1970–71 | First round |
| 1969–70 Eerste Divisie | 9th | – | 1969–70 | Round of 16 |
| 1968–69 Tweede Divisie | 1st | Eerste Divisie (promotion) | 1968–69 | First round |
| 1967–68 Tweede Divisie | 6th | – | 1967–68 | Group stages |
| 1966–67 Eerste Divisie | 18th | Tweede Divisie (relegation) | 1966–67 | Did not participate |
| 1965–66 Tweede Divisie | 2nd (group A) | Eerste Divisie (promotion) | 1965–66 | Round of 16 |
| 1964–65 Tweede Divisie | 11th (group A) | – | 1964–65 | First round |
| 1963–64 Tweede Divisie | 5th (group B) | – | 1963–64 | First round |
| 1962–63 Tweede Divisie | 15th (group A) | – | 1962–63 | Third round |
| 1961–62 Tweede Divisie | 10th | – | 1961–62 | First round |
| 1960–61 Tweede Divisie | 11th | – | 1960–61 | Group stages |
| 1959–60 Eerste Divisie | 17th (group B) | Tweede Divisie (relegation) | not held | not held |
| 1958–59 Eerste Divisie | 14th (group A) | – | 1958–59 | Did not participate |
| 1957–58 Eerste Divisie | 4th (group A) | – | 1957–58 | Second round |
| 1956–57 Eerste Divisie | 10th (group A) | – | 1956–57 | Second round |

== Players ==
=== Current squad ===
As of 24 September 2026

Note: Flags indicate national team as defined under FIFA eligibility rules; some limited exceptions apply. Players may hold more than one non-FIFA nationality.

| No. | Pos. | Nation | Player |
|---|---|---|---|
| 1 | GK | NED | Ties Wieggers |
| 2 | DF | GER | Jannes Wieckhoff |
| 3 | DF | NED | Rowan Besselink |
| 4 | DF | NED | Joran Hardeman |
| 5 | DF | NED | Levi Schoppema |
| 6 | MF | NED | Clint Leemans (captain) |
| 7 | FW | NED | Bjorn van Zijl |
| 8 | MF | NED | Donny Warmerdam |
| 9 | FW | GER | Julian Kania |
| 10 | MF | NED | Fedde de Jong |
| 11 | FW | FIN | Toivo Mero |
| 14 | DF | NED | Gijs Bolk |
| 15 | DF | NED | Thomas Kok |
| 16 | DF | BEL | Nolan Martens |
| 17 | MF | FRA | Nathan Kaninda |
| 18 | MF | NED | Denzel Eijken |
| 20 | FW | ITA | Gabriele Finocchiaro (on loan from Juventus Next Gen) |

| No. | Pos. | Nation | Player |
|---|---|---|---|
| 21 | DF | NED | Kaya Symons |
| 22 | GK | GHA | Paul Reverson (on loan from Jong Ajax) |
| 23 | MF | NED | Mark Diemers |
| 24 | MF | NED | Jason Meerstadt |
| 25 | DF | LBR | Mark Pabai |
| 27 | MF | KOS | Nart Ahmeti-Grainca |
| 28 | MF | NED | Jorn Triep |
| 30 | FW | FRA | Benjamin Mambo |
| 31 | GK | NED | Sam Bouwman |
| 32 | DF | NED | Tygo Grotenhuis |
| 33 | GK | NED | Rick Jonkers |
| 34 | DF | NED | Nic Hartgers |
| 36 | MF | NED | Tim Braem |
| 37 | MF | NED | Cem Eroglu |
| 38 | MF | BEL | Milan Smits |
| 40 | FW | NED | Kyano Kwint |

=== Notable former players ===
The players below had senior international cap(s) for their respective countries. Players whose name is listed represented their countries while playing for De Graafschap.

- (Australia) Jason Čulina
- (Burkina Faso) Mamadou Zongo
- (Canada) Will Johnson
- (Republic of the Congo) Yannick Salem
- (Democratic Republic of the Congo) Zico Tumba
- (Denmark) Hans Aabech
- (Denmark) Lasse Schöne
- (Egypt) Hazem Emam
- (Finland) Jussi Kujala
- (Finland) Niklas Tarvajärvi
- (Finland) Ville Väisänen
- (Ghana) Ali Ibrahim Pelé
- (Guadeloupe) Loïc Loval
- (Iceland) Arnar Viðarsson
- (Indonesia) Jhon van Beukering
- (Israel) Ben Sahar
- (Israel) Gil Vermouth
- (Latvia) Ģirts Karlsons
- (Liberia) Dulee Johnson
- (North Macedonia) Xhelil Abdulla
- (Mali) Bakary Diakité
- (Morocco) Oussama Assaidi
- (Netherlands) Youssef El Jebli
- (Netherlands) Ernie Brandts
- (Netherlands) John van den Brom
- (Netherlands) Jean-Paul van Gastel
- (Netherlands) Klaas-Jan Huntelaar
- (Netherlands) Luuk de Jong
- (Netherlands) Jurrie Koolhof
- (Netherlands) Kees Krijgh
- (Netherlands) Martijn Meerdink
- (Netherlands) Peter van Vossen
- (Netherlands) Dick Schoenaker
- (Netherlands) Sonny Silooy
- (Netherlands) Erik ten Hag
- (Netherlands) Hans Kraay Jr.
- (Nigeria) Wasiu Taiwo
- (Poland) Tomasz Rząsa
- (Switzerland) Stephan Keller
- (Curaçao) Charlison Benschop

== Coaching staff ==
As of 9 October 2026
| Position | Name |
|---|---|
| Head coach | Thomas Duivenvoorden |
| Assistant coaches | Mees Siers |
| Assistant coaches | Mathijs de Waard |
| Goalkeeping coach | Jordy Rondeel |
| Video analyst | Reinier Haasnoot |
| Technical director | Berry Powel |

== Managerial history ==
- (Netherlands) Leendert IJssennagger (1954–55)
- (Netherlands) Heinz Huber (1955)
- (Netherlands) Jan Poulus (1955–59)
- (Netherlands) Wim Engel (1959)
- (England) Eric Jones (1960–62)
- (Netherlands) Evert Teunissen (1962–67)
- (Netherlands) Ad Zonderland (1967–71)
- (Netherlands) Bert van Lingen (1971)
- (Netherlands) Piet de Visser (1971–74)
- (Netherlands) Evert Teunissen (1974–76)
- (Netherlands) Ben Polak (interim) (1976)
- (Netherlands) Hans Dorjee (1976–77)
- (Netherlands) Henk Ellens (1977–78)
- (Netherlands) Pim van de Meent (1978–80)
- (Netherlands) Huib Ruijgrok (1980–83)
- (Hungary) Sandor Popovics (1983–85)
- (Netherlands) Henk van Brussel (1985–87)
- (Netherlands) Pim Verbeek (1987–89)
- (Netherlands) Ben Zweers (1989)
- (Netherlands) Simon Kistemaker (1989–93)
- (Netherlands) Jan Versleijen (1993–94)
- (Netherlands) Frans Körver (1994–95)
- (Netherlands) Hans van Doorneveld (1995)
- (Germany) Fritz Korbach (1995–98)
- (Netherlands) Frans Thijssen (1999)
- (England) Rob McDonald (1999–00)
- (Netherlands) Jurrie Koolhof (interim) (2000)
- (Netherlands) Gerard Marsman (2000–01)
- (Netherlands) Jurrie Koolhof (2001–02)
- (Netherlands) Peter Bosz (2002–03)
- (Netherlands) Frans Adelaar (2003–04)
- (Netherlands) Gert Kruys (2004–05)
- (Netherlands) Andries Ulderink (interim) (2005)
- (Netherlands) Jan de Jonge (2005–08)
- (Netherlands) Henk van Stee (2008–09)
- (Bosnia and Herzegovina) Darije Kalezić (2009–11)
- (Netherlands) Andries Ulderink (2011–12)
- (Netherlands) Richard Roelofsen (interim) (2012)
- (Netherlands) Pieter Huistra (2012–13)
- (Netherlands) Jan Vreman (interim) (2013–14)
- (Scotland) Jimmy Calderwood (2014)
- (Netherlands) Jan Vreman (2014–16)
- (Netherlands) Henk de Jong (2017–2019)
- (Netherlands) Mike Snoei (2019–2021)
- (Netherlands) Reinier Robbemond (2021–2022)
- (Netherlands) Jan Vreman (interim) (2022)
- (Netherlands) Adrie Poldervaart (2022–2023)
- (Netherlands) Richard Roelofsen (interim) (2023)
- (Netherlands) Jan Vreman (2023–2025)
- (Netherlands) Marinus Dijkhuizen (2025–present)

== See also ==
- Dutch football league teams
