= Simon Kistemaker (football manager) =

Dutch football manager (1940–2021)

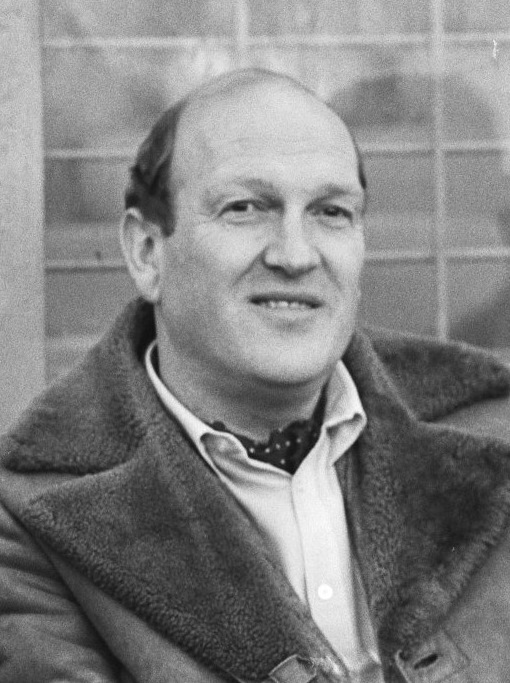
- Kistemaker in 1984

Personal information
- Date of birth: 29 August 1940
- Place of birth: IJmuiden, Netherlands
- Date of death: 23 November 2021 (aged 81)

Managerial career
- Years: Team
- 1969–1970: HFC EDO
- 1970–1971: ZFC
- 1984: FC Volendam
- 1984–1985: DS '79
- 1985–1986: SC Cambuur
- 1986–1989: DS '79
- 1989–1993: De Graafschap
- 1993–1995: SC Telstar
- 1995: FC Utrecht
- 1996–1999: SV Spakenburg
- 1999–2001: SC Telstar
- 2005–2007: FC Türkiyemspor
- 2007–2008: FC Breukelen
- 2008–2009: ADO '20 (technical director)
- 2009: ADO '20 (caretaker)

Simon Kistemaker (29 August 1940 – 23 November 2021) was a Dutch football manager.
