= 2020–21 SC Telstar season =

SC Telstar
2020–21 season
- Stadium: Sportpark Schoonenberg
- Eerste Divisie: 13th
- KNVB Cup: 1st round
- Top goalscorer: League: Glynor Plet (19 goals); All: Glynor Plet (19 goals)
- Highest home attendance: 765 (1st week)
- Biggest win: 6-1 (FC Den Bosch (h) 5th week)
- Biggest defeat: 3-0 (Jong PSV (a) 6th week Heracles Almelo (a) KNVB 1st round); 4-1 (FC Den Bosch (a) 37th week)
- All statistics correct as of 12 May 2021.

The 2020–21 season marked the 58th season in the history of SC Telstar since the club's establishment. It was also their 44th campaign in the Eerste Divisie and their 43rd consecutive season in the second tier of Dutch football.

In addition to competing in the Eerste Divisie, SC Telstar participated in the KNVB Cup, reaching the second round before being eliminated by Heracles Almelo in a 3–0 defeat.

SC Telstar ended the league campaign in 13th place, with Glynor Plet finishing as the club's leading goalscorer after scoring 19 goals, all in the Eerste Divisie.

Jasper Schendelaar made more appearances than any other SC Telstar player during the season, featuring in 37 matches across all competitions, including 36 league games and one KNVB Cup appearance.

== Players ==
=== First-team squad ===
As of 29 January 2021

Note: Flags indicate national team as defined under FIFA eligibility rules; some limited exceptions apply. Players may hold more than one non-FIFA nationality.

No.	Pos.	Nation	Player
1	GK	NED	Jasper Schendelaar
2	DF	NED	Ilias Bronkhorst
3	DF	NED	Kick Groot
4	DF	MAR	Benaissa Benamar
4	DF	NED	Farouq Limouri
5	DF	NED	Redouan El Yaakoubi
6	DF	NED	Frank Korpershoek
7	FW	NED	Rashaan Fernandes
8	MF	NED	Sven van Doorm
9	FW	NED	Glynor Plet
10	MF	ENG	Daniel Adshead
11	FW	NED	Anthony Berenstein
12	FW	NED	Robin Eindhoven
12	FW	USA	Sebastian Soto
13	DF	NED	Vincent Regeling
15	MF	NED	Redouan Taha

No.	Pos.	Nation	Player
16	MF	NED	Niels van Wetten
17	GK	CUW	Trevor Doornbusch
18	FW	NED	Gyliano van Velzen
19	FW	HAI	Richelor Sprangers
21	MF	NED	Anass Najah
23	MF	NED	Cas Dijkstra
24	DF	BEL	Siebe Vandermeulen
25	DF	IDN	Shayne Pattynama
26	MF	NED	Tom Overtoom
27	MF	SUR	Roscello Vlijter
28	MF	BEL	Welat Cagro
30	FW	AZE	Ozan Kökçü
39	MF	NED	Marouan El Ouardani
43	DF	NED	Yaël Liesdek
45	MF	NED	Lesley Bakker

== Transfers ==
=== In ===
Pos.	Player	Transferred from	Fee	Date
GK	(Netherlands) Jasper Schendelaar	(Netherlands) AZ Alkmaar	On loan	1 July 2020
MF	(Netherlands) Niels van Wetten	(Netherlands) ADO Den Haag U21	Free	1 July 2020
DF	(Belgium) Siebe Vandermeulen	(Belgium) KRC Genk U21	Free	1 July 2019
GK	(Curaçao) Trevor Doornbusch	(Netherlands) SC Heerenveen	Free	16 July 2020
DF	(Netherlands) Redouan Taha	No club		18 August 2020
MF	(England) Daniel Adshead	(England) Norwich City F.C.	On loan	26 August 2020
FW	(United States) Sebastian Soto	(England) Norwich City F.C.	On loan	26 August 2020
DF	(Netherlands) Vincent Regeling	(Netherlands) Jong AZ	Free	5 September 2020
FW	(Netherlands) Gyliano van Velzen	(England) Crawley Town F.C.	Free	7 September 2020
MF	(Netherlands) Tom Overtoom	No club		19 November 2020
MF	(Azerbaijan) Ozan Kökçü	(Azerbaijan) Sabah FK	On loan	13 January 2021
DF	(Netherlands) Farouq Limouri	(Netherlands) Sparta Rotterdam U18	On loan	29 January 2021
FW	(Netherlands) Robin Eindhoven	(Netherlands) SV Spakenburg	Free	29 January 2021

=== Out ===
Pos.	Player	Transferred to	Fee	Date
MF	(Scotland) Charlie Gilmour	(Netherlands) Norwich City F.C. U23	End of loan	30 June 2020
FW	(Netherlands) Elayis Tavşan	(Netherlands) Sparta Rotterdam	End of loan	30 June 2020
GK	(Belgium) Anthony Swolfs	(Netherlands) FC Dordrecht	Free	1 July 2020
DF	(Netherlands) Melle Springer	(Netherlands) IJ.V.V. Stormvogels	Free	1 July 2020
FW	(Netherlands) Reda Kharchouch	(Netherlands) Sparta Rotterdam		1 July 2020
MF	(Belgium) Senne Lynen	(Belgium) Royale Union Saint-Gilloise	Free	1 July 2020
GK	(Netherlands) Sven van der Maaten	(Netherlands) SVV Scheveningen	Free	1 July 2020
DF	(Morocco) Benaissa Benamar	(Netherlands) FC Utrecht		6 January 2021
FW	(United States) Sebastian Soto	(England) Norwich City FC	End of loan	21 January 2021
DF	(Indonesia) Shayne Pattynama	(Norway) Viking FK		1 April 2021

== Competitions ==
=== Overall record ===
Competition	First match	Last match	Starting round	Final position	Record							
Competition	First match	Last match	Starting round	Final position	Pld	W	D	L	GF	GA	GD	Win %
Eerste Divisie	30 August 2020	12 May 2021	Week 1	13th	38	10	11	17	57	61	−4	26.32
KNVB Cup	28 October 2020	28 October 2020	1st round	1st round	1	0	0	1	0	3	−3	0.00
Total					39	10	11	18	57	64	−7	25.64

Source: Competitions

=== Eerste Divisie ===
==== League table ====
Pos	Team	Pld	W	D	L	GF	GA	GD	Pts	Promotion or qualification
11	MVV Maastricht	38	13	7	18	50	72	−22	46	
12	Helmond Sport	38	11	12	15	51	68	−17	45	
13	Telstar	38	10	11	17	57	61	−4	41	
14	Jong PSV	38	10	10	18	54	65	−11	40	Reserve teams are not eligible to be promoted to the 2021–22 Eredivisie
15	FC Eindhoven	38	10	10	18	50	62	−12	40	

Source: Soccerway, Keuken Kampioen Divisie (in Dutch)
Rules for classification: Season in progress: 1) Most points won; 2) Less points lost; 3) Goal difference; 4) Goals scored; 5) Alphabetical order; End of season: 1) Points; 2) Goal difference; 3) Goals scored; 4) Head-to-head points; 5) Head-to-head goal difference; 6) Head-to-head away goals scored; 7) Play-off if relevant for deciding champion, relegation or participating in a European league, otherwise by draw. 8) Penalty shoot-out (only after a play-off)

==== Results summary ====
Overall								Home						Away					
Pld	W	D	L	GF	GA	GD	Pts	W	D	L	GF	GA	GD	W	D	L	GF	GA	GD
38	10	11	17	57	61	−4	41	5	6	8	37	31	+6	5	5	9	20	30	−10

Last updated: 12 May 2021.
Source: https://www.espn.nl/voetbal/team/scorebord/_/id/3735/season/2020/

==== Results by round ====
Round	1	2	3	4	5	6	7	8	9	10	11	12	13	14	15	16	17	18	19	20	21	22	23	24	25	26	27	28	29	30	31	32	33	34	35	36	37	38
Ground	H	A	H	A	H	A	H	A	H	A	H	A	H	A	H	H	A	H	A	A	H	A	A	H	H	A	A	H	H	A	H	A	A	H	A	H	A	H
Result	D	W	L	W	W	L	D	D	W	D	L	L	W	W	L	L	W	W	L	W	D	D	L	L	D	L	L	L	W	L	L	D	D	D	L	D	L	L
Position																																						13

Source: https://www.espn.nl/voetbal/team/scorebord/_/id/3735/season/2020/
A = Away; H = Home; W = Win; D = Draw; L = Loss

=== Matches ===
==== 1st half ====
30 August 2020 1st week	SC Telstar	2–2	FC Volendam	Velsen-Zuid
12:15	Ilias Bronkhorst 6' 39'	Report	Nick Doodeman 43'; Zakaria El Azzouzi 68'	Stadium: Sportpark Schoonenberg; Attendance: 765

5 September 2020 2nd week	FC Eindhoven	2–3	SC Telstar	Eindhoven
16:30	Hugo Botermans 46'; Kaj de Rooij 53'	Report	Ilias Bronkhorst 30'; Shayne Pattynama 64' 70'	Stadium: Jan Louwers Stadion; Attendance: 746

13 September 2020 3rd week	SC Telstar	1–2	MVV Maastricht	Velsen-Zuid
20:00	Glynor Plet 64'	Report	Jelle Duin 42' (pen.); Koen Kostons 88'	Stadium: Sportpark Schoonenberg; Attendance: 620

22 September 2020 4th week	Excelsior Rotterdam	1–2	SC Telstar	Rotterdam
18:45	Joël Zwarts 46'	Report	Sven van Doorm 69'; Yaël Liesdek 90+5'	Stadium: Stadion Woudestein; Attendance: 1,250

28 September 2020 5th week	SC Telstar	6–1	FC Den Bosch	Velsen-Zuid
21:00	Sebastian Soto 13' 29'; Glynor Plet 47'; Ilias Bronkhorst 67' 81'; Gyliano van Velzen 72'	Report	Jizz Hornkamp 79'	Stadium: Sportpark Schoonenberg; Attendance: 728

2 October 2020 6th week	Jong PSV	3–0	SC Telstar	Eindhoven
18:45	Nigel Thomas 57'; Kristofer Kristinsson 60'; Djenairo Daniels 79'	Report		Stadium: De Herdgang

10 October 2020 7th week	SC Telstar	1–1	TOP Oss	Velsen-Zuid
21:00	Sebastian Soto 5'	Report	Cas Peters 90+3'	Stadium: Sportpark Schoonenberg

19 October 2020 8th week	Roda JC Kerkrade	1–1	SC Telstar	Kerkrade
20:00	Erik Falkenburg 51'	Report	Welat Cagro 88' (pen.)	Stadium: Parkstad Limburg Stadion

23 October 2020 9th week	SC Telstar	2–0	Helmond Sport	Velsen-Zuid
18:45	Sebastian Soto 49' 63'	Report		Stadium: Sportpark Schoonenberg

2 November 2020 10th week	Jong AZ	1–1	SC Telstar	The Hague
18:45	Yusuf Barası 10'	Report	Ilias Bronkhorst 39'	Stadium: AFAS Trainingscomplex

10 November 2020 11th week	SC Telstar	1–2	Go Ahead Eagles	Velsen-Zuid
21:00	Glynor Plet 56'	Report	Jacob Mulenga 68' 82'	Stadium: Sportpark Schoonenberg

14 November 2020 12th week	NAC Breda	1–0	SC Telstar	Breda
18:45	Jethro Mashart 68'	Report		Stadium: Rat Verlegh Stadion

19 November 2020 13th week	SC Telstar	2–0	FC Dordrecht	Velsen-Zuid
18:45	Glynor Plet 59' 61'	Report		Stadium: Sportpark Schoonenberg

30 November 2020 14th week	Jong FC Utrecht	1–2	SC Telstar	Utrecht
18:45	Jeredy Hilterman 6'	Report	Sebastian Soto 21'; Glynor Plet 85'	Stadium: Sportcomplex Zoudenbalch

4 December 2020 15th week	SC Telstar	1–2	SC Cambuur	Velsen-Zuid
18:45	Gyliano van Velzen 54'	Report	Jamie Jacobs 60'; Robert Mühren 79'	Stadium: Sportpark Schoonenberg

11 December 2020 16th week	SC Telstar	2–3	Almere City FC	Velsen-Zuid
21:00	Glynor Plet 16'; Ilias Bronkhorst 66'	Report	Xian Emmers 2' 8'; Ilias Alhaft 10'	Stadium: Sportpark Schoonenberg

21 December 2020 17th week	Jong Ajax	1–2	SC Telstar	Duivendrecht, Amsterdam
21:00	Ar'jany Martha 11'	Report	Rashaan Fernandes 54'; Niels van Wetten 84'	Stadium: Sportpark De Toekomst

==== 2nd half ====
3 January 2021 18th week	SC Telstar	5–2	NEC Nijmegen	Velsen-Zuid
16:45	Gyliano van Velzen 11' 40'; Glynor Plet 43' 78'; Sebastian Soto 75'	Report	Terell Ondaan 60'; Elayis Tavşan 81'	Stadium: Sportpark Schoonenberg

8 January 2021 19th week	De Graafschap	2–0	SC Telstar	Doetinchem
18:45	Joey Konings 15'; Ralf Seuntjens 35'	Report		Stadium: De Vijverberg

16 January 2021 20th week	TOP Oss	1–4	SC Telstar	Oss
18:30	Mart Remans 89'	Report	Shayne Pattynama 3'; Glynor Plet 27' 48' 65'	Stadium: Frans Heesen Stadion

22 January 2021 21st week	SC Telstar	2–2	Jong AZ	Velsen-Zuid
21:00	Ilias Bronkhorst 16'; Frank Korpershoek 87'	Report	Kenzo Goudmijn 33'; Peer Koopmeiners 76'	Stadium: Sportpark Schoonenberg

29 January 2021 22nd week	Helmond Sport	1–1	SC Telstar	Helmond
20:00	Lance Duijvestijn 32'	Report	Shayne Pattynama 68'	Stadium: Stadion De Braak

13 February 2021 23rd week	Go Ahead Eagles	1–0	SC Telstar	Almelo
12:00	Jacob Mulenga 5'	Report		Stadium: Asito Stadion

16 February 2021 24th week	SC Telstar	1–2	NAC Breda	Velsen-Zuid
21:00	Glynor Plet 45'	Report	Mounir El Allouchi 47'; Mario Bilate 83'	Stadium: Sportpark Schoonenberg

19 February 2021 25th week	SC Telstar	1–1	FC Eindhoven	Velsen-Zuid
21:00	Glynor Plet 23'	Report	Bart Biemans 90+4'	Stadium: Sportpark Schoonenberg

25 February 2021 26th week	MVV Maastricht	2–0	SC Telstar	Maastricht
18:45	Kürşad Sürmeli 49'; Manuel Angiulli 90+6'	Report		Stadium: De Geusselt

5 March 2021 27th week	SC Cambuur	3–1	SC Telstar	Leeuwarden
21:00	Robin Maulun 11'; Robert Mühren 19'; Jarchinio Antonia 56'	Report	Rashaan Fernandes 44'	Stadium: Cambuur Stadion

12 March 2021 28th week	SC Telstar	1–2	FC Eindhoven	Velsen-Zuid
21:00	Cas Dijkstra 41'	Report	Ted van de Pavert 10'; Jasper van Heertum 90'	Stadium: Sportpark Schoonenberg

19 March 2021 29th week	SC Telstar	3–1	Roda JC Kerkrade	Velsen-Zuid
20:00	Cas Dijkstra 45+1'; Glynor Plet 69'; Ozan Kökçü 90+4'	Report	Fabian Serrarens 8'	Stadium: Sportpark Schoonenberg

29 March 2021 30th week	FC Dordrecht	1–0	SC Telstar	Dordrecht
18:45	Kevin Jansen 64'	Report		Stadium: Stadion Krommedijk

2 April 2021 31st week	SC Telstar	2–3	Jong FC Utrecht	Velsen-Zuid
20:00	Glynor Plet 20'; Gyliano van Velzen 62'	Report	Remco Balk 8'; Jeredy Hilterman 15'; Odysseus Velanas 56'	Stadium: Sportpark Schoonenberg

5 April 2021 32nd week	NEC Nijmegen	1–1	SC Telstar	Nijmegen
12:15	Lesley Bakker 39' (o.g.)	Report	Glynor Plet 58'	Stadium: Goffertstadion

12 April 2021 33rd week	Almere City FC	1–1	SC Telstar	Almere
20:00	Radinio Balker 90+5'	Report	Glynor Plet 14'	Stadium: Yanmar Stadion

16 April 2021 34th week	SC Telstar	1–1	Excelsior Rotterdam	Velsen-Zuid
20:00	Ozan Kökçü 38'	Report	Sondre Skogen 90'	Stadium: Sportpark Schoonenberg

25 April 2021 35th week	FC Volendam	2–0	SC Telstar	Volendam
14:30	Martijn Kaars 16'; Lequincio Zeefuik 90+2'	Report		Stadium: Kras Stadion

30 April 2021 36th week	SC Telstar	2–2	Jong PSV	Velsen-Zuid
20:00	Glynor Plet 27'; Frank Korpershoek 63'	Report	Nigel Thomas 34'; Emmanuel Matuta 90+2'	Stadium: Sportpark Schoonenberg; Attendance: 380

7 May 2021 37th week	FC Den Bosch	4–1	SC Telstar	's-Hertogenbosch
20:00	Junior van der Velden 23'; Sebastiaan van Bakel 28' 71'; Jizz Hornkamp 52'	Report	Ilias Bronkhorst 80'	Stadium: De Vliert

12 May 2021 38th week	SC Telstar	1–2	Jong Ajax	Velsen-Zuid
20:00	Ilias Bronkhorst 48'	Report	Amourricho van Axel Dongen 42'; Liam van Gelderen 58'	Stadium: Sportpark Schoonenberg

=== KNVB Cup ===
28 October 2020 1st round	Heracles Almelo	3–0	SC Telstar	Almelo
19:45	Sinan Bakış 28' (pen.); Rai Vloet 72'; Adrián Szőke 90+2'	Report		Stadium: Asito Stadion

== Statistics ==
=== Scorers ===
#	Player	Eerste Divisie
1	(Netherlands) Glynor Plet	19
2	(Netherlands) Ilias Bronkhorst	10
3	(United States) Sebastian Soto	7
4	(Netherlands) Gyliano van Velzen	5
5	(Indonesia) Shayne Pattynama	4
6	(Netherlands) Cas Dijkstra	2
6	(Netherlands) Frank Korpershoek	2
6	(Azerbaijan) Ozan Kökçü	2
6	(Netherlands) Rashaan Fernandes	2
10	(Netherlands) Niels van Wetten	1
10	(Netherlands) Sven van Doorm	1
10	(Belgium) Welat Cagro	1
10	(Belgium) Yaël Liesdek	1

=== Appearances ===
#	Player	Eerste Divisie	KNVB	Total
1	(Netherlands) Jasper Schendelaar	36	1	37
2	(Netherlands) Glynor Plet	35	1	36
2	(Netherlands) Redouan El Yaakoubi	35	1	36
4	(Netherlands) Ilias Bronkhorst	33	1	34
5	(Netherlands) Anass Najah	31	1	32
6	(Netherlands) Gyliano van Velzen	29	1	30
7	(England) Daniel Adshead	28	1	29
8	(Indonesia) Shayne Pattynama	27	1	28
8	(Belgium) Welat Cagro	27	1	28
10	(England) Rashaan Fernandes	27	0	27
11	(Netherlands) Cas Dijkstra	25	1	26
12	(Netherlands) Sven van Doorm	24	1	25
13	(Netherlands) Yaël Liesdek	20	0	20
14	(Netherlands) Frank Korpershoek	19	0	19
14	(Netherlands) Vincent Regeling	19	0	19
14	(Belgium) Siebe Vandermeulen	18	1	19
17	(Azerbaijan) Ozan Kökçü	18	0	18
18	(Netherlands) Anthony Berenstein	16	0	16
18	(Netherlands) Redouan Taha	16	0	16
20	(Morocco) Benaissa Benamar	13	0	13
20	(Netherlands) Tom Overtoom	13	0	13
22	(Netherlands) Robin Eindhoven	12	0	12
22	(United States) Sebastian Soto	12	0	12
24	(Netherlands) Farouq Limouri	9	0	9
25	(Netherlands) Niels van Wetten	8	0	8
25	(Haiti) Richelor Sprangers	7	1	8
27	(Suriname) Roscello Vlijter	6	0	6
28	(Netherlands) Lesley Bakker	4	0	4
29	(Netherlands) Kick Groot	3	0	3
30	(Netherlands) Marouan El Ouardani	2	0	2
30	(Curaçao) Trevor Doornbusch	2	0	2

=== Clean sheets ===
#	Player	Eerste Divisie
1	(Netherlands) Jasper Schendelaar	2

=== Disciplinary record ===
#	Player	Eerste Divisie		KNVB		Total	
#	Player	Yellow card	Red card	Yellow card	Red card	Yellow card	Red card
1	(Netherlands) Cas Dijkstra	0	1	0	0	0	1
1	(United States) Sebastian Soto	0	1	0	0	0	1
3	(Netherlands) Anass Najah	7	0	0	0	7	0
4	(Netherlands) Redouan El Yaakoubi	5	0	1	0	6	0
5	(Netherlands) Glynor Plet	5	0	0	0	5	0
5	(Belgium) Siebe Vandermeulen	5	0	0	0	5	0
5	(Belgium) Welat Cagro	4	0	1	0	5	0
8	(Netherlands) Vincent Regeling	4	0	0	0	4	0
9	(England) Daniel Adshead	3	0	0	0	3	0
9	(Indonesia) Shayne Pattynama	3	0	0	0	3	0
9	(Netherlands) Yaël Liesdek	2	0	1	0	3	0
12	(Netherlands) Farouq Limouri	2	0	0	0	2	0
13	(Netherlands) Frank Korpershoek	1	0	0	0	1	0
13	(Netherlands) Jasper Schendelaar	1	0	0	0	1	0
13	(Netherlands) Niels van Wetten	1	0	0	0	1	0
13	(Netherlands) Redouan Taha	1	0	0	0	1	0
13	(Netherlands) Robin Eindhoven	1	0	0	0	1	0
13	(Netherlands) Sven van Doorm	1	0	0	0	1	0
13	(Netherlands) Tom Overtoom	1	0	0	0	1	0
