= 2019–20 SC Telstar season =

SC Telstar
2019–20 season
- Stadium: Sportpark Schoonenberg
- Eerste Divisie: 10th
- KNVB Cup: 2nd round
- Top goalscorer: League: Reda Kharchouch (22 goals); All: Reda Kharchouch (20 goals)
- Highest home attendance: 5,200 (KNVB 1st round)
- Lowest home attendance: 850 (1st week)
- Average home league attendance: 2,394
- Biggest win: 3-0 (Excelsior Rotterdam (h) 3rd week); 4-1 (Helmond Sport (a) 12th week)
- Biggest defeat: 7-1 (NEC Nijmegen (h) 25th week)
- All statistics correct as of 6 March 2020.

The 2019–20 season represented the 57th year in the history of SC Telstar since its foundation.

The campaign officially covered the period from 1 July 2019 to 30 June 2020. However, the outbreak of the COVID-19 pandemic disrupted Dutch professional football, prompting the KNVB to bring the season to an early conclusion on 24 April 2020. The standings at the time of the suspension were adopted as the final league table, with no champions declared and neither promotion nor relegation taking place.

During the 2019–20 campaign, SC Telstar competed in the Eerste Divisie for the 43rd time, extending their uninterrupted presence in the second division of Dutch football to 42 consecutive seasons.

Alongside their domestic league participation, Telstar entered the KNVB Cup. Their involvement ended in the second round following a 4–3 defeat to AFC Ajax.

Telstar finished the shortened Eerste Divisie season in 10th position.

Reda Kharchouch finished as the club's top scorer with 22 goals across all competitions, including 20 in the Eerste Divisie and two in the KNVB Cup.

Frank Korpershoek made the highest number of appearances for Telstar, playing 31 matches in all competitions, comprising 29 league appearances and two KNVB Cup outings.

== Players ==
=== First-team squad ===
As of 31 January 2020

Note: Flags indicate national team as defined under FIFA eligibility rules; some limited exceptions apply. Players may hold more than one non-FIFA nationality.

No.	Pos.	Nation	Player
1	GK	BEL	Anthony Swolfs
2	DF	NED	Shaquill Sno
4	MF	SCO	Charlie Gilmour
5	DF	NED	Redouan El Yaakoubi
6	DF	NED	Frank Korpershoek
7	FW	NED	Elayis Tavşan
8	MF	BEL	Senne Lynen
9	DF	NED	Reda Kharchouch
10	DF	NED	Melle Springer
11	FW	NED	Anthony Berenstein
12	GK	NED	Sven van der Maaten
13	DF	NED	Ilias Bronkhorst

No.	Pos.	Nation	Player
14	MF	ENG	Marcus McGuane
15	FW	NED	Rashaan Fernandes
17	MF	NED	Sven van Doorm
18	DF	MAR	Benaissa Benamar
19	FW	HAI	Richelor Sprangers
21	MF	NED	Anass Najah
23	MF	NED	Cas Dijkstra
25	DF	IDN	Shayne Pattynama
28	MF	BEL	Welat Cagro
29	FW	NED	Glynor Plet
30	FW	BEL	Tuur Houben

== Transfers ==
=== In ===
Pos.	Player	Transferred from	Fee	Date
DF	(Netherlands) Anthony Berenstein	(Netherlands) FC Volendam	On loan	1 July 2019
GK	(Belgium) Anthony Swolfs	(Belgium) KAA Gent	Free	1 July 2019
DF	(Netherlands) Cas Dijkstra	(Netherlands) HVV Hollandia U19	Free	1 July 2019
FW	(Netherlands) Reda Kharchouch	(Netherlands) OFC Oostzaan	Free	1 July 2019
FW	(Haiti) Richelor Sprangers	(Netherlands) NAC Breda	Free	1 July 2019
MF	(Suriname) Roscello Vlijter	(Netherlands) Feyenoord U19	Free	1 July 2019
DF	(Netherlands) Shayne Pattynama	(Netherlands) FC Utrecht U21	Free	1 July 2019
FW	(Belgium) Tuur Houben	(Netherlands) MVV Maastricht	Free	1 July 2019
MF	(Scotland) Charlie Gilmour	(England) Norwich City F.C. U23	On loan	18 July 2019
DF	(Netherlands) Redouan El Yaakoubi	(Netherlands) FC Utrecht U21	Free	19 July 2019
FW	(Netherlands) Glynor Plet	(Turkey) Alanyaspor	Free	23 July 2019
DF	(Morocco) Benaissa Benamar	(Morocco) IR Tangier	Free	3 August 2018
FW	(Netherlands) Elayis Tavşan	(Netherlands) Sparta Rotterdam	On loan	19 August 2019
MF	(England) Marcus McGuane	(Spain) Barcelona B	On loan	2 September 2019
FW	(Netherlands) Rashaan Fernandes	No club		3 September 2019
MF	(Belgium) Welat Cagro	No club	Free	31 January 2020

=== Out ===
Pos.	Player	Transferred to	Fee	Date
MF	(Guinea-Bissau) Ahmad Mendes Moreira	(Netherlands) FC Groningen	End of loan	30 June 2019
FW	(Netherlands) Adham El Idrissi	No club		1 July 2019
MF	(Netherlands) Darren Rosheuvel	(Netherlands) Wooter Academy		1 July 2019
FW	(Switzerland) Karim Rossi	(Switzerland) FC Chiasso	Free	1 July 2019
DF	(Netherlands) Toine van Huizen	(Netherlands) De Graafschap	Free	1 July 2019
GK	(Netherlands) Wesley Zonneveld	(Netherlands) SVV Scheveningen	Free	1 July 2019
FW	(Guyana) Terell Ondaan	(France) Grenoble Foot 38	€200,000	2 July 2019
DF	(Netherlands) Donny van Iperen	(Netherlands) Go Ahead Eagles	Free	8 July 2019
DF	(Cape Verde) Rodny Lopes Cabral	(Romania) CSM Politehnica Iași	Free	23 July 2019
DF	(Netherlands) Jasper van Heertum	(Netherlands) De Graafschap	Free	26 July 2019
DF	(Netherlands) Elvio van Overbeek	(Northern Ireland) Glentoran F.C.	Free	6 August 2019
MF	(Netherlands) Dylan Mertens	(Netherlands) TOP Oss	Free	8 August 2019
DF	(Cape Verde) Elso Brito	(Netherlands) Go Ahead Eagles	Free	26 August 2019
MF	(Netherlands) Danny van Haaren	(Netherlands) VV Katwijk	Free	27 August 2019
FW	(Belgium) Tuur Houben	(Belgium) Bocholt VV	Free	11 January 2020
MF	(England) Marcus McGuane	(Spain) FC Barcelona Atlètic	End of loan	31 January 2020
DF	(Netherlands) Shaquill Sno	(Norway) Aalesunds FK		14 February 2020

== Competitions ==
=== Overall record ===
Competition	First match	Last match	Starting round	Final position	Record							
Competition	First match	Last match	Starting round	Final position	Pld	W	D	L	GF	GA	GD	Win %
Eredivisie	12 August 2019	6 March 2020	Week 1	10th	29	12	8	9	47	48	−1	41.38
KNVB Cup	29 October 2019	18 December 2019	1st round	2nd round	2	1	0	1	7	5	+2	50.00
Total					31	13	8	10	54	53	+1	41.94

Source: ESPN

=== Eerste Divisie ===
==== League table ====
Pos	Team	Pld	W	D	L	GF	GA	GD	Pts
8	NEC Nijmegen	29	12	9	8	51	37	+14	45
9	Almere City FC	29	13	5	11	44	42	+2	44
10	Telstar	29	12	8	9	47	48	−1	44
11	FC Den Bosch (Note: Den Bosch were deducted three points for not meeting budget requirements to create a healthy financial position.)	29	10	11	8	56	49	+7	38
12	Jong FC Utrecht (Note: Reserves teams are not eligible to be promoted to the 2020–21 Eredivisie.)	29	10	8	11	48	47	+1	38

Updated to match(es) played on 9 March 2020. Source: Soccerway, Keuken Kampioen Divisie (in Dutch)
Rules for classification: Season in progress: 1) Most points won; 2) Fewest points lost; 3) Goal difference; 4) Goals scored; 5) Alphabetical order; End of season: 1) Points; 2) Goal difference; 3) Goals scored; 4) Head-to-head points; 5) Head-to-head goal difference; 6) Head-to-head away goals scored; 7) Play-off if relevant for deciding champion, relegation or participating in a European league, otherwise by draw. 8) Penalty shoot-out (only after a play-off)

==== Results summary ====
Overall								Home						Away					
Pld	W	D	L	GF	GA	GD	Pts	W	D	L	GF	GA	GD	W	D	L	GF	GA	GD
29	12	8	9	47	48	−1	44	8	2	6	21	21	0	4	6	3	26	27	−1

Last updated: 6 March 2020.
Source: https://www.espn.nl/voetbal/team/scorebord/_/id/3735/season/2019/

==== Results by round ====
Round	1	2	3	4	5	6	7	8	9	10	11	12	13	14	15	16	17	18	19	20	21	22	23	24	25	26	27	28	29
Ground	A	A	H	A	H	A	H	A	H	A	H	A	H	A	H	A	H	H	A	H	H	A	H	A	H	A	H	A	H
Result	D	W	W	L	L	W	L	L	L	D	W	W	W	D	L	W	L	D	D	W	W	D	W	L	L	D	W	D	W
Position																													10

Source: https://www.espn.nl/voetbal/team/scorebord/_/id/3735/season/2019/
A = Away; H = Home; W = Win; D = Draw; L = Loss

=== Matches ===
==== 1st half ====
12 August 2019 1st week	Jong AZ	0–0	SC Telstar	The Hague
20:00		Report		Stadium: AFAS Trainingscomplex; Attendance: 850

16 August 2019 2nd week	FC Den Bosch	0–1	SC Telstar	's-Hertogenbosch
20:00		Report	Sven van Doorm 89'	Stadium: De Vliert; Attendance: 2,855

23 August 2019 3rd week	SC Telstar	3–0	Excelsior Rotterdam	Velsen-Zuid
20:00	Reda Kharchouch 36'; Senne Lynen 58'; Glynor Plet 90+1'	Report		Stadium: Sportpark Schoonenberg; Attendance: 2,362

30 August 2019 4th week	NEC Nijmegen	4–2	SC Telstar	Nijmegen
20:00	Ole Romeny 19' 69'; Randy Wolters 64'; Jonathan Okita 90'	Report	Elayis Tavşan 60'; Glynor Plet 72'	Stadium: Goffertstadion; Attendance: 6,734

7 September 2019 5th week	SC Telstar	0–2	SC Cambuur	Velsen-Zuid
18:30		Report	Jamie Jacobs 24'; Alex Bangura 85'	Stadium: Sportpark Schoonenberg; Attendance: 2,685

13 September 2019 6th week	MVV Maastricht	1–2	SC Telstar	Maastricht
20:00	Joeri Schroyen 90+2'	Report	Glynor Plet 52'; Reda Kharchouch 66'	Stadium: De Geusselt; Attendance: 3,403

20 September 2019 7th week	SC Telstar	1–2	FC Volendam	Velsen-Zuid
20:00	Rashaan Fernandes 90+3'	Report	Francesco Antonucci 51'; Jelle Duin 84'	Stadium: Sportpark Schoonenberg; Attendance: 2,782

27 September 2019 8th week	FC Eindhoven	4–1	SC Telstar	Eindhoven
20:00	Samy Bourard 32' 54'; Joey Sleegers 42'; Collin Seedorf 82'	Report	Anthony Berenstein 74'	Stadium: Jan Louwers Stadion; Attendance: 1,934

4 October 2019 9th week	SC Telstar	1–2	Roda JC Kerkrade	Velsen-Zuid
20:00	Glynor Plet 65'	Report	Ike Ugbo 51'; Niels Verburgh 88'	Stadium: Sportpark Schoonenberg; Attendance: 2,120

12 October 2019 10th week	TOP Oss	2–2	SC Telstar	Oss
18:30	Shaquill Sno 19' (o.g.); Philippe Rommens 43'	Report	Reda Kharchouch 33' 52'	Stadium: Frans Heesen Stadion; Attendance: 1,239

18 October 2019 11th week	SC Telstar	1–0	Almere City FC	Velsen-Zuid
20:00	Reda Kharchouch 1'	Report		Stadium: Sportpark Schoonenberg; Attendance: 1,946

25 October 2019 12th week	Helmond Sport	1–4	SC Telstar	Helmond
20:00	Diego Snepvangers 77'	Report	Elayis Tavşan 13'; Reda Kharchouch 22' 44'; Marcus McGuane 69'	Stadium: Stadion De Braak; Attendance: 1,732

1 November 2019 13th week	SC Telstar	2–0	Jong FC Utrecht	Velsen-Zuid
20:00	Benaissa Benamar 19'; Reda Kharchouch 54'	Report		Stadium: Sportpark Schoonenberg; Attendance: 1,995

8 November 2019 14th week	Jong PSV	1–1	SC Telstar	Eindhoven
20:00	Sekou Sidibe 90+4'	Report	Sven van Doorm 67'	Stadium: De Herdgang; Attendance: 412

17 November 2019 15th week	SC Telstar	0–2	Go Ahead Eagles	Velsen-Zuid
12:15		Report	Elmo Lieftink 51'; Julius Bliek 90+4'	Stadium: Sportpark Schoonenberg; Attendance: 2,701

22 November 2019 16th week	FC Dordrecht	2–3	SC Telstar	Dordrecht
20:00	Pedro Marques 40' 49' (pen.)	Report	Reda Kharchouch 23' 63'; Elayis Tavşan 38'	Stadium: Stadion Krommedijk; Attendance: 1,490

29 November 2019 17th week	SC Telstar	2–3	Jong Ajax	Velsen-Zuid
20:00	Ilias Bronkhorst 85'; Reda Kharchouch 87' (pen.)	Report	Jasper ter Heide 20'; Carel Eiting 58' (pen.); Jurgen Ekkelenkamp 69'	Stadium: Sportpark Schoonenberg; Attendance: 3,063

6 December 2019 18th week	SC Telstar	1–1	NAC Breda	Velsen-Zuid
20:00	Elayis Tavşan 59'	Report	Hüseyin Doğan 7'	Stadium: Sportpark Schoonenberg; Attendance: 2,064

13 December 2019 19th week	De Graafschap	2–2	SC Telstar	Doetinchem
20:00	Leeroy Owusu 68'; Ralf Seuntjens 90+4'	Report	Benaissa Benamar 36'; Reda Kharchouch 90+3'	Stadium: De Vijverberg; Attendance: 9,311

22 December 2019 20th week	SC Telstar	3–1	Jong AZ	Velsen-Zuid
14:30	Joey Jacobs 18' (o.g.); Elayis Tavşan 64'; Reda Kharchouch 90+7'	Report	Tijjani Reijnders 63'	Stadium: Sportpark Schoonenberg; Attendance: 2,500

==== 2nd half ====
10 January 2020 21st week	SC Telstar	2–0	FC Eindhoven	Velsen-Zuid
20:00	Elayis Tavşan 2'; Reda Kharchouch 52'	Report		Stadium: Sportpark Schoonenberg; Attendance: 1,980

17 January 2020 22nd week	Excelsior Rotterdam	3–3	SC Telstar	Rotterdam
20:00	Elías Már Ómarsson 48' 57'; Frank Korpershoek 70' (o.g.)	Report	Shayne Pattynama 15'; Reda Kharchouch 65'; Glynor Plet 71'	Stadium: Stadion Woudestein; Attendance: 2,722

24 January 2020 23rd week	SC Telstar	1–0	TOP Oss	Velsen-Zuid
20:00	Reda Kharchouch 64'	Report		Stadium: Sportpark Schoonenberg; Attendance: 1,883

31 January 2020 24th week	Almere City FC	4–2	SC Telstar	Almere
20:00	Thomas Verheydt 24' 30'; Anass Ahannach 72'; Nick Venema 80'	Report	Benaissa Benamar 18'; Glynor Plet 33'	Stadium: Yanmar Stadion; Attendance: 2,339

7 February 2020 25th week	SC Telstar	1–7	NEC Nijmegen	Velsen-Zuid
20:00	Elayis Tavşan 30'	Report	Ole Romeny 8'; Anthony Musaba 32'; Zian Flemming 34' 45'; Rens van Eijden 66'; Benaissa Benamar 90+1' (o.g.); Ayman Sellouf 90+2'	Stadium: Sportpark Schoonenberg; Attendance: 2,401

14 February 2020 26th week	FC Volendam	1–1	SC Telstar	Volendam
20:00	Shayne Pattynama 3' (o.g.)	Report	Glynor Plet 34'	Stadium: Kras Stadion; Attendance: 3,978

21 February 2020 27th week	SC Telstar	2–1	MVV Maastricht	Velsen-Zuid
20:00	Reda Kharchouch 53' 79'	Report	Anthony van den Hurk 12' (pen.)	Stadium: Sportpark Schoonenberg; Attendance: 1,763

28 February 2020 28th week	Jong Ajax	2–2	SC Telstar	Duivendrecht, Amsterdam
20:00	Sontje Hansen 20'; Victor Jensen 26'	Report	Reda Kharchouch 54' 86' (pen.)	Stadium: Sportpark De Toekomst; Attendance: 1,051

6 March 2020 29th week	SC Telstar	1–0	Jong PSV	Velsen-Zuid
20:00	Shurandy Sambo 44' (o.g.)	Report		Stadium: Sportpark Schoonenberg; Attendance: 2,401

=== KNVB Cup ===
29 October 2019 1st round	Koninklijke HFC	1–2	SC Telstar	Haarlem
19:45	Khalid Tadmine 10'	Report	Anthony Berenstein 22'; Reda Kharchouch 90+3' (pen.)	Stadium: Spanjaardslaan; Attendance: 260

18 December 2019 2nd round	SC Telstar	3–4	Jong Ajax	Velsen-Zuid
18:30	Frank Korpershoek 44'; Benaissa Benamar 60'; Reda Kharchouch 88'	Report	Noa Lang 25'; Sergiño Dest 28' 57'; Jurgen Ekkelenkamp 48'	Stadium: Sportpark Schoonenberg; Attendance: 5,200

== Statistics ==
=== Scorers ===
#	Player	Eerste Divisie	KNVB	Total
1	(Netherlands) Reda Kharchouch	20	2	22
2	(Netherlands) Elayis Tavşan	7	0	7
2	(Netherlands) Glynor Plet	7	0	7
4	(Morocco) Benaissa Benamar	3	1	4
5	(Netherlands) Sven van Doorm	2	0	2
5	(Netherlands) Anthony Berenstein	2	0	2
7	(Netherlands) Ilias Bronkhorst	1	0	1
7	(England) Marcus McGuane	1	0	1
7	(Netherlands) Rashaan Fernandes	1	0	1
7	(Belgium) Senne Lynen	1	0	1
7	(Indonesia) Shayne Pattynama	1	0	1
7	(Netherlands) Frank Korpershoek	0	1	1

=== Appearances ===
#	Player	Eerste Divisie	KNVB	Total
1	(Netherlands) Frank Korpershoek	29	2	31
2	(Netherlands) Reda Kharchouch	22	2	30
3	(Netherlands) Anass Najah	26	2	28
3	(Morocco) Benaissa Benamar	26	2	28
5	(Belgium) Senne Lynen	25	2	27
6	(Scotland) Charlie Gilmour	24	1	25
6	(Netherlands) Sven van Doorm	23	2	25
8	(Netherlands) Elayis Tavşan	22	1	23
8	(Netherlands) Redouan El Yaakoubi	22	1	23
8	(Netherlands) Anthony Berenstein	21	2	23
8	(Netherlands) Glynor Plet	21	2	23
12	(Netherlands) Ilias Bronkhorst	19	2	21
13	(Belgium) Anthony Swolfs	19	1	20
13	(Indonesia) Shayne Pattynama	18	2	20
15	(England) Marcus McGuane	14	2	16
16	(England) Rashaan Fernandes	14	1	15
17	(Netherlands) Shaquill Sno	14	0	14
18	(Netherlands) Melle Springer	11	0	11
18	(Netherlands) Sven van der Maaten	10	1	11
20	(Haiti) Richelor Sprangers	8	0	8
21	(Netherlands) Cas Dijkstra	3	0	3
21	(Belgium) Tuur Houben	3	0	3
23	(Netherlands) Abdellah Ouazane	1	0	1
23	(Belgium) Welat Cagro	1	0	1

=== Clean sheets ===
#	Player	Eerste Divisie
1	(Belgium) Anthony Swolfs	6
2	(Netherlands) Sven van der Maaten	3
Total		9

=== Disciplinary record ===
#	Player	Eerste Divisie		KNVB		Total	
#	Player	Yellow card	Red card	Yellow card	Red card	Yellow card	Red card
1	(Netherlands) Anass Najah	7	0	1	0	8	0
2	(Indonesia) Shayne Pattynama	6	0	0	0	6	0
3	(Scotland) Charlie Gilmour	5	0	0	0	5	0
3	(Netherlands) Elayis Tavşan	5	0	0	0	5	0
5	(Netherlands) Elayis Tavşan	3	0	0	0	3	0
5	(Netherlands) Ilias Bronkhorst	3	0	0	0	3	0
5	(Netherlands) Shaquill Sno	3	0	0	0	3	0
8	(Netherlands) Anthony Berenstein	2	0	0	0	2	0
8	(Morocco) Benaissa Benamar	2	0	0	0	2	0
8	(Netherlands) Frank Korpershoek	2	0	0	0	2	0
8	(Belgium) Senne Lynen	2	0	0	0	2	0
8	(Netherlands) Sven van der Maaten	2	0	0	0	2	0
8	(Netherlands) Reda Kharchouch	1	0	1	0	2	0
14	(Belgium) Anthony Swolfs	1	0	0	0	1	0
14	(England) Marcus McGuane	1	0	0	0	1	0
14	(Netherlands) Redouan El Yaakoubi	1	0	0	0	1	0
