= List of SC Telstar seasons =

This is a list of the seasons played by SC Telstar from 1963.

== Summary of SC Telstar seasons ==
=== 1960s ===
Telstar was founded in 1963 following the merger of the professional sections of VSV and Stormvogels. In their inaugural season, the club finished second in the 1963–64 Eerste Divisie and immediately earned promotion to the Eredivisie. Telstar subsequently established themselves in the top flight, finishing tenth in their first Eredivisie campaign and remaining in the division throughout the rest of the decade. Their best KNVB Cup performance during the 1960s came in 1965–66, when they reached the quarter-finals.

=== 1970s ===
Telstar spent most of the 1970s in the Eredivisie and enjoyed the strongest league period in the club's history. They achieved their highest-ever top-flight finish by placing sixth in the 1973–74 Eredivisie, followed by seventh place in 1974–75 and ninth in 1975–76. Their fortunes declined towards the end of the decade, however, and an 18th-place finish in 1977–78 Eredivisie ended a run of 14 consecutive seasons in the Eredivisie. Telstar spent the remainder of the decade in the Eerste Divisie.

=== 1980s ===
Telstar spent the entire 1980s in the Eerste Divisie and were unable to regain their former top-flight status. Their strongest league campaign of the decade came in 1981–82 Eerste Divisie, when they finished fourth and competed in the promotion competition but failed to return to the Eredivisie. The club generally occupied mid-table and lower-table positions for the remainder of the decade.

=== 1990s ===
The highlight of the decade came in the 1991–92 KNVB Cup, when Telstar reached the semi-finals after defeating HFC Haarlem 4–1 in the quarter-finals. Their run ended with a 3–0 defeat against Roda JC Kerkrade. In league competition, Telstar remained in the Eerste Divisie throughout the decade. They finished fifth in 1993–94 and entered the promotion/relegation play-offs, but narrowly missed promotion after finishing second in their group behind RKC Waalwijk.

=== 2000s ===
Telstar continued to compete in the Eerste Divisie throughout the 2000s. Between 2001 and 2008, the club competed under the name Stormvogels Telstar as part of a merger with the amateur club Stormvogels, before returning to the name Telstar following the dissolution of the arrangement. Their most notable KNVB Cup run of the decade came in 2001–02 KNVB Cup, when they reached the quarter-finals. Telstar also qualified for the promotion play-offs in 2001 and 2009 but failed to secure promotion to the Eredivisie.

=== 2010s ===
Telstar remained in the Eerste Divisie throughout the decade. After several seasons in the lower half of the table, the club enjoyed a notable improvement in 2017–18 Eerste Divisie, finishing sixth and qualifying for the promotion play-offs. Telstar defeated De Graafschap 3–2 in the first leg of their play-off tie but lost the return match 4–2 and were eliminated 6–5 on aggregate. The sixth-place league finish was the club's best since the mid-1990s.

=== 2020s ===
After several more seasons in the Eerste Divisie, Telstar achieved a historic return to the top flight in 2024–25 SC Telstar season. The club finished seventh in the regular season and qualified for the promotion play-offs, where they eliminated ADO Den Haag and FC Den Bosch before facing Willem II Tilburg in the final. After a 2–2 draw in the first leg, Telstar won 3–1 in Tilburg to secure promotion to the Eredivisie for the first time in 47 years. The result ended a continuous 47-season spell in the second tier and marked the club's first Eredivisie campaign since 1977–78.

== Seasons ==
Key to KNVB Cup rounds:

- 2R – Second round
- 3R – Third round
- GS – Group stage
- QF – Quarter-final
- R16 – 1/8 Final (round of 16)
- R32 – 1/16 Final (round of 32)
- SF – Semi-final

Seasons of VVV-Venlo
#	Season	League					KNVB Cup	Top scorer(s)	
#	Season	Division	Total	Consecutive	Pts	Pos	KNVB Cup	Player(s)	Goals
1	1963–64	Eerste Divisie	1st	1st	39	2nd (Note: Promoted to Eredivisie.)	—	—	—
2	1964–65	Eredivisie	1st	1st	28	10th	—	—	—
3	1965–66	Eredivisie	2nd	2nd	22	13th	—	—	—
4	1966–67	Eredivisie	3rd	3rd	24	16th	—	—	—
5	1967–68	Eredivisie	4th	4th	29	11th	—	—	—
6	1968–69	Eredivisie	5th	5th	24	14th	—	—	—
7	1969–70	Eredivisie	6th	6th	24	14th	—	—	—
8	1970–71	Eredivisie	7th	7th	27	11th	—	—	—
9	1971–72	Eredivisie	8th	8th	29	11th	—	—	—
10	1972–73	Eredivisie	9th	9th	28	12th	—	—	—
11	1973–74	Eredivisie	10th	10th	36	6th	—	—	—
12	1974–75	Eredivisie	11th	11th	36	7th	—	—	—
13	1975–76	Eredivisie	12th	12th	29	9th	—	—	—
14	1976–77	Eredivisie	13th	13th	26	14th	—	—	—
15	1977–78	Eredivisie	14th	14th	14	18th (Note: Relegated to Eerste Divisie.)	—	—	—
16	1978–79	Eerste Divisie	2nd	1st	34	10th	—	—	—
17	1979–80	Eerste Divisie	3rd	2nd	31	13th	—	—	—
18	1980–81	Eerste Divisie	4th	3rd	35	11th	—	—	—
19	1981–82	Eerste Divisie	5th	4th	44	3rd	—	—	—
20	1982–83	Eerste Divisie	6th	5th	20	15th	—	—	—
21	1983–84	Eerste Divisie	7th	6th	37	5th	—	—	—
22	1984–85	Eerste Divisie	8th	7th	27	15th	—	—	—
23	1985–86	Eerste Divisie	9th	8th	41	6th	—	—	—
24	1986–87	Eerste Divisie	10th	9th	21	19th	—	—	—
25	1987–88	Eerste Divisie	11th	10th	34	13th	—	—	—
26	1988–89	Eerste Divisie	12th	11th	29	14th	—	—	—
27	1989–90	Eerste Divisie	13th	12th	26	18th	—	—	—
28	1990–91	Eerste Divisie	14th	13th	33	13th	—	—	—
29	1991–92	Eerste Divisie	15th	14th	41	7th	—	—	—
30	1992–93	Eerste Divisie	16th	15th	21	18th	—	—	—
31	1993–94	Eerste Divisie	17th	16th	40	5th	—	—	—
32	1994–95	Eerste Divisie	18th	17th	30	11th	—	—	—
33	1995–96	Eerste Divisie	19th	18th	50	9th	—	—	—
34	1996–97	Eerste Divisie	20th	19th	28	16th	—	—	—
35	1997–98	Eerste Divisie	21st	20th	40	13th	—	—	—
36	1998–99	Eerste Divisie	22nd	21st	26	18th	—	—	—
37	1999–2000	Eerste Divisie	23rd	22nd	37	13th	—	—	—
38	2000–01	Eerste Divisie	24th	23rd	53	7th	—	—	—
39	2001–02	Eerste Divisie	25th	24th	45	9th (Note: Played as Stormvogels/Telstar)	—	—	—
40	2002–03	Eerste Divisie	26th	25th	38	11th	—	—	—
41	2003–04	Eerste Divisie	27th	26th	44	12th	—	—	—
42	2004–05	Eerste Divisie	28th	27th	56	7th	—	—	—
43	2005–06	Eerste Divisie	29th	28th	40	16th	—	—	—
44	2006–07	Eerste Divisie	30th	29th	48	10th	—	—	—
45	2007–08	Eerste Divisie	31st	30th	46	14th	—	—	—
46	2008–09	Eerste Divisie	32nd	31st	39	17th	—	—	—
47	2009–10	Eerste Divisie	33rd	32nd	29	18th	—	—	—
48	2010–11	Eerste Divisie	34th	33rd	34	14th	—	—	—
49	2011–12	Eerste Divisie	35th	34th	32	15th	—	—	—
50	2012–13	Eerste Divisie	36th	35th	29	14th	—	—	—
51	2013–14	Eerste Divisie	37th	36th	45	15th	—	—	—
52	2014–15	Eerste Divisie	38th	37th	42	15th	—	—	—
53	2015–16	Eerste Divisie	39th	38th	44	12th	—	—	—
54	2016–17	Eerste Divisie	40th	39th	40	16th	2R	(Netherlands) Fabian Serrarens	8
61	2017–18	Eerste Divisie	41st	40th	61	6th	1R	(United States) Andrija Novakovich	21
56	2018–19	Eerste Divisie	42nd	41st	48	15th	1R	(Guyana) Terell Ondaan	13
57	2019–20	Eerste Divisie	43rd	42nd	44	10th	2R	(Netherlands) Reda Kharchouch	22
58	2020–21	Eerste Divisie	44th	43rd	41	13th	1R	(Netherlands) Glynor Plet	19
59	2021–22	Eerste Divisie	45th	44th	35	19th	R16	(Netherlands) Glynor Plet	14
60	2022–23	Eerste Divisie	46th	45th	53	9th	2R	(Netherlands) Glynor Plet	11
61	2023–24	Eerste Divisie	47th	46th	35	17th	1R	(Netherlands) Zakaria Eddahchouri	14
62	2024–25	Eerste Divisie	48th	47th	61	7th (Note: Promoted to Eredivisie via play-offs.)	2R	(Morocco) Youssef El Kachati	25
63	2025–26	Eredivisie	15th	1st	37	14th	SF	(Netherlands) Patrick Brouwer	9
64	2026–27	Eredivisie	16th	2nd	—	—		—	—
