= Welat Cagro =

Belgian footballer (born 1999)

Personal information
- Date of birth: 31 May 1999 (age 27)
- Place of birth: Schaerbeek, Belgium
- Height: 1.89 m (6 ft 2 in)
- Position: Midfielder

Youth career
- –2013: Anderlecht
- 2013–2014: Mechelen
- 2014–2016: OH Leuven
- 2016–2019: Gent

Senior career*
Years	Team	Apps	(Gls)
2019	Urartu	10	(0)
2020–2021	Telstar	28	(1)
2021–2023	NAC Breda	22	(1)
2023–2025	Beerschot	47	(4)
2025–2026	Portimonense	26	(4)
- * Club domestic league appearances and goals as of 16 August 2026

Welat Cagro (born 31 May 1999) is a Belgian professional footballer who plays as a midfielder.

== Career ==
=== Early career ===
Born in Schaerbeek, Brussels, to Kurdish parents, Cagro began playing football with his local club, where he was scouted by Anderlecht. Afterwards, he also played in the youth academies of Mechelen and Oud-Heverlee Leuven, where he left in 2016 sign for Gent, joining their youth teams.

=== Urartu ===
After failing to break through to Gent's first team, Cagro signed for Armenian Premier League club Urartu in 2019. He made his professional debut on 3 March 2019 in a 1–1 away draw against Noah, coming on as a substitute for Pape Abdou Camara. He made a total of 10 appearances for Urartu.

=== Telstar ===
For the second half of 2019–20, he signed for Dutch second division club Telstar. He made his first appearance for the club on 28 February 2019, coming on as a substitute in the 81st minute of a 2–2 draw against Jong Ajax, replacing Rashaan Fernandes. The competition was shortly after suspended and since cancelled due to the COVID-19, which meant that he only made one appearance for the club that season.

On 19 October 2020, Cagro scored his first professional goal, securing a 1–1 draw against Roda JC Kerkrade on a converted penalty kick shortly before full-time. He had replaced Sven van Doorm only seven minutes earlier. At the end of the season, he had made 28 appearances in which he scored once, as his contract with Telstar expired.

=== NAC Breda ===
In November 2021, Cagro signed with NAC Breda after a successful trial. On 19 November, he made his debut for the club in a 1–1 draw against Jong FC Utrecht in the Eerste Divisie, replacing Jarchinio Antonia at half-time.

Cagro's contract with NAC was terminated by mutual consent on 19 March 2023.

=== Beerschot ===
In June 2023, Cagro signed a two-year contract with Beerschot, and helped them to promotion to the Belgian top flight in his first season at the club, under first-team coach Dirk Kuyt.

=== Portimonense ===
In August 2025, Cagro signed a two-year contract with Liga Portugal 2 club Portimonense.

== Honours ==
Beerschot

- Challenger Pro League: 2023–24
