= Imad Najah =

Moroccan footballer (born 1991)

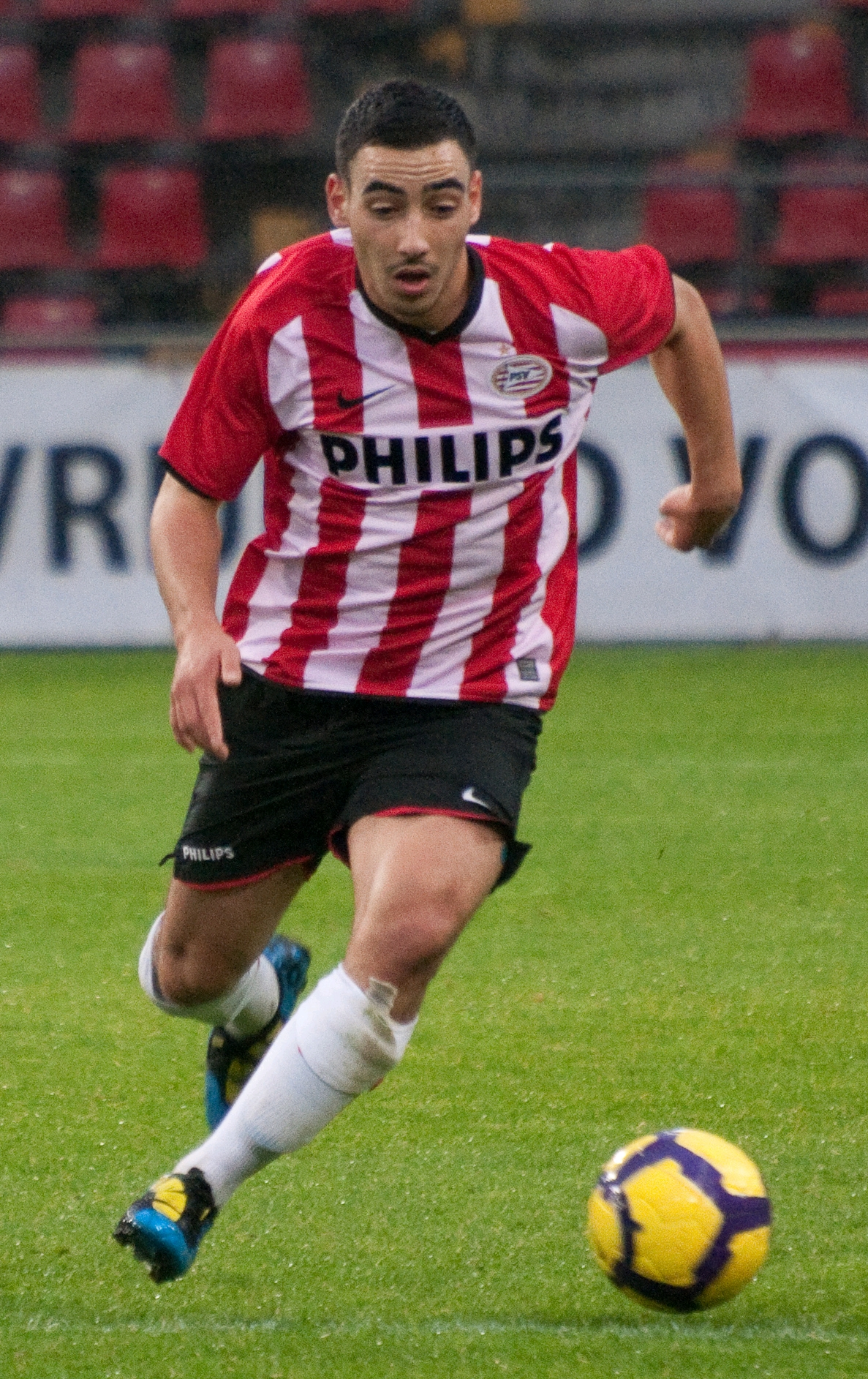
- Najah with PSV U23 in 2010

Personal information
- Date of birth: 19 February 1991 (age 35)
- Place of birth: Utrecht, Netherlands
- Position: Defensive midfielder

Youth career
- USV Elinkwijk
- 2001–2012: PSV

Senior career*
Years	Team	Apps	(Gls)
2012–2016	RKC Waalwijk	33	(1)
2017	Jong Vitesse	11	(2)
2017–2022	DHSC		

International career
2012	Morocco U23	2	(0)
- * Club domestic league appearances and goals

Imad Najah (born 19 February 1991) is a Moroccan former professional footballer who played as a defensive midfielder.

== Club career ==
Born in Utrecht, Netherlands, Najah evolved as a prospect from PSV's youth academy. He made his professional debut for RKC Waalwijk in 2012.

He ended his professional career in 2017, and played the following five years at amateur level for DHSC in his hometown. During the same period he worked as a scout for Vitesse.

== International career ==
Najah represented Morocco at the 2012 Summer Olympics.

== Personal ==
He is the older brother of Anass Najah.
