= Ilias Bronkhorst =

Dutch footballer (born 1997)

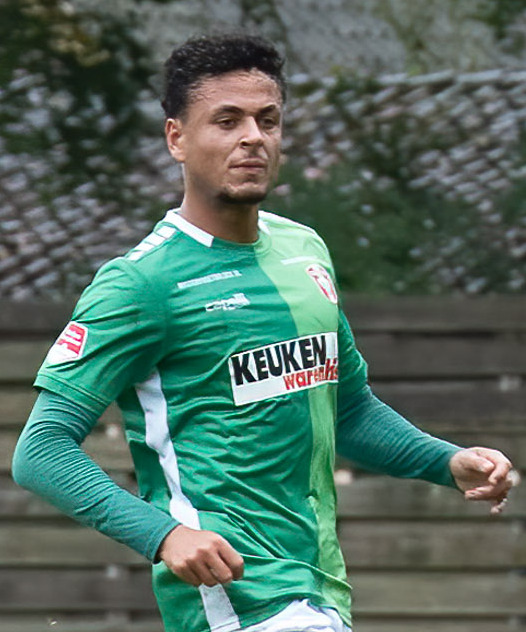
- Bronkhorst with Dordrecht in 2023

Personal information
- Date of birth: 10 May 1997 (age 29)
- Place of birth: Haarlem, Netherlands
- Height: 1.85 m (6 ft 1 in)
- Position: Right-back

Team information
- Current team: Huddersfield Town
- Number: 22

Youth career
- –2017: Koninklijke HFC

Senior career*
Years	Team	Apps	(Gls)
2017–2018	Koninklijke HFC	17	(0)
2018–2021	Telstar	55	(11)
2021–2023	NEC	16	(0)
2023–2024	Dordrecht	31	(5)
2024–2026	Excelsior	70	(5)
2026–	Huddersfield Town	14	(2)
- * Club domestic league appearances and goals as of 18 November 2026

Ilias Bronkhorst (born 10 May 1997) is a Dutch professional footballer who plays for EFL League One club Huddersfield Town.

== Club career ==
He made his Eerste Divisie debut for Telstar on 31 August 2018 in a game against Jong Utrecht, as a 69th-minute substitute for Melle Springer.

On 25 August 2023, Bronkhorst signed a one-season contract with Dordrecht.

On 6 August 2024, he signed with Excelsior for one season, with an option for a second.

On 3 July 2026, Bronkhorst signed for EFL League One club Huddersfield Town on a two-year contract.

== Personal life ==
Bronkhorst was born in Haarlem, Netherlands. Bronkhorst is of Moroccan descent through his mother's side.

== Career statistics ==
As of match played 16 February 2024

Appearances and goals by club, season and competition
Club	Season	League			National Cup		Other		Total	
Club	Season	Division	Apps	Goals	Apps	Goals	Apps	Goals	Apps	Goals
Koninklijke HFC	2017-18	Tweede Divisie	17	0	1	0	0	0	18	0
Telstar	2018-19	Eerste Divisie	3	0	1	0	0	0	4	0
Telstar	2019-20	Eerste Divisie	19	1	2	0	0	0	21	1
Telstar	2020-21	Eerste Divisie	33	10	1	0	0	0	34	10
Telstar	Total		55	11	4	0	0	0	59	11
NEC	2021-22	Eredivisie	12	0	3	0	0	0	15	0
NEC	2022-23	Eredivisie	4	0	2	0	0	0	6	0
NEC	2023-24	Eredivisie	0	0	0	0	0	0	0	0
NEC	Total		16	0	5	0	0	0	21	0
Dordrecht	2023-24	Eerste Divisie	23	5	2	0	0	0	25	5
Career total			111	16	12	0	0	0	123	16
