= Vincent Regeling =

Dutch footballer

Personal information
- Date of birth: 7 May 1997 (age 29)
- Place of birth: Heemstede, Netherlands
- Height: 1.86 m (6 ft 1 in)
- Position: Defender

Youth career
- 2004–2007: SV Hoofddorp
- 2007–2010: Haarlem
- 2010–2011: RKSV Pancratius
- 2011–2016: AZ

Senior career*
| Years | Team | Apps | (Gls) |
| 2016–2020 | Jong AZ | 40 | (0) |
| 2020–2021 | Telstar | 19 | (0) |
- * Club domestic league appearances and goals as of 14 February 2022

Vincent Regeling (born 7 May 1997) is a Dutch professional footballer who plays as a defender.

== Club career ==
Born in Heemstede, Regeling played in the youth academies of SV Hoofddorp, HFC Haarlem and RKSV Pancratius, before joining the AZ youth system. He made his Eerste Divisie debut for Jong AZ on 1 September 2017 in a game against Jong FC Utrecht. His contract with AZ expired in the summer of 2020.

On 4 September 2020, Regeling signed a two-year contract with Telstar. He made his debut on 13 September in a 1–2 home loss to MVV, playing the full match.

== Personal life ==
Born in the Netherlands, Regeling is of Surinamese descent.
