= Farouq Limouri =

Dutch-Moroccan footballer (born 2003)

Personal information
- Date of birth: 15 March 2003 (age 23)
- Place of birth: Rotterdam, Netherlands
- Height: 1.85 m (6 ft 1 in)
- Position: Centre-back

Team information
- Current team: Grenoble
- Number: 3

Youth career
- 2012–2015: Feyenoord
- 2015–2021: Sparta Rotterdam

Senior career*
| Years | Team | Apps | (Gls) |
| 2021 | → Telstar (loan) | 9 | (0) |
| 2021–2023 | Jong Sparta | 30 | (0) |
| 2023–2026 | FC Eindhoven | 90 | (6) |
| 2026– | Grenoble | 0 | (0) |

International career^{‡}
| 2021 | Morocco U20 | | |
| 2021–2022 | Netherlands U19 | 4 | (0) |
- * Club domestic league appearances and goals as of 28 April 2026 ‡ National team caps and goals as of 7 June 2022

Farouq Limouri (Arabic: فاروق ليموري; born 15 March 2003) is a Dutch-Moroccan professional footballer who plays as a centre-back for French Ligue 2 club Grenoble.

== Club career ==
Limouri played in the youth academy of Feyenoord before joining Sparta Rotterdam in 2015. He signed his first contract in January 2021, to run until 2023 at the age of 17 years-old. After joining SC Telstar on loan, he made his professional football debut as a 17-year-old, in the Eerste Divisie on 19 February 2021, in a 1–1 draw at home against FC Eindhoven, an experience he described as a “dream come true”. In August 2021 a match between Jong Sparta and Koninklijke HFC was abandoned after a head injury to Limouri caused an ambulance to have come to the pitch and take him to hospital with concussion, following an accidental collision with American youth international Desevio Payne who was playing for the opposing team.

For the 2023–24 season, Limouri signed with FC Eindhoven. He made his league debut for the club in the Eerste Divisie against Willem II Tilburg on 13 August 2023, in a 1–1 draw. He scored his first league goal for the club when he scored the opening goal in a 4–3 away win for his side over local rivals Jong PSV in the Eerste Divisie on 23 October 2023.

On 22 July 2026, Limouri joined Grenoble in France.

== International career ==
In June 2021 Limouri was called up the Moroccan squad for the 2021 Arab Cup U-20 held in Egypt, receiving a red card in their match against Algeria U20. He was called up to the Netherlands U19 squad in October 2021. He featured for the Dutch U19 side in a 5–0 home win over Cyprus U19 on 13 November 2021, appearing as a second-half substitute for Justin Hubner.
