= 2023–24 U.D. Leiria season =

U.D. Leiria
2023–24 season
- Manager: Vasco Botelho da Costa
- Stadium: Estádio Dr. Magalhães Pessoa
- Liga Portugal 2: 14th
- Taça de Portugal: Quarter-finals
- Taça da Liga: Second round
- Top goalscorer: League: Leandro Antunes (5); All: Bryan Róchez (7)

The 2023–24 season is U.D. Leiria's 58th season in existence and first one back in the Liga Portugal 2. They are also competing in the Taça de Portugal and Taça da Liga.

== Players ==
=== First-team squad ===
As of 12 October 2023

Note: Flags indicate national team as defined under FIFA eligibility rules; some limited exceptions apply. Players may hold more than one non-FIFA nationality.

No.	Pos.	Nation	Player
1	GK	POL	Pawel Kieszek
2	DF	POR	Tiago Ferreira
3	DF	RUS	Vitali Lystsov
4	DF	POR	Bura
5	MF	CPV	Babanco
6	DF	POR	Marco Baixinho
7	FW	POR	Leandro Antunes
8	FW	POR	Arsénio
10	MF	NED	Jordan van der Gaag
11	FW	BRA	Jair Silva
14	DF	POR	Pedro Empis
15	DF	POR	Kaká
16	DF	CPV	Cuca
17	MF	ARG	Lucho Vega
19	MF	POR	Afonso Valente

No.	Pos.	Nation	Player
20	FW	POR	João Resende
21	MF	POR	Leandro Silva
22	DF	BRA	Valdir
24	DF	CIV	Zié Ouattara
25	MF	POR	Diogo Amado (captain)
29	GK	POR	Fábio Ferreira
30	FW	POR	Sérgio Ribeiro
35	FW	HON	Bryan Róchez (on loan from Portimonense)
45	MF	POR	Gonçalo Batalha
47	GK	POR	João Oliveira
55	MF	GHA	Joseph Amoah
72	DF	POR	Vasco Oliveira
77	FW	POR	Martim Ribeiro
88	MF	UKR	Vladyslav Kobylyanskyi

=== On loan ===
Note: Flags indicate national team as defined under FIFA eligibility rules; some limited exceptions apply. Players may hold more than one non-FIFA nationality.

No.	Pos.	Nation	Player
42	MF	CIV	Dje Tah Davilla (at Académica de Coimbra until 30 June 2024)
—	MF	POR	Diogo Leitão (at Atlético CP until 30 June 2024)

== Transfers ==
=== In ===
Pos.	Player	Transferred from	Fee	Date	Source
MF	(Portugal) [[ ]]	(Portugal)	Free	July 2023	

=== Out ===
Pos.	Player	Transferred to	Fee	Date	Source
MF	(Portugal) [[ ]]	(Portugal)	Free	July 2023	

== Pre-season and friendlies ==
Win Draw Loss Fixtures

7 July 2023 Friendly	Caldas (Portugal)	1–0	(Portugal) União de Leiria

3 August 2023 Friendly	União de Leiria (Portugal)	3–0	(Angola) Petro Atlético Luanda

== Competitions ==
=== Overall record ===
Competition	First match	Last match	Starting round	Final position	Record							
Competition	First match	Last match	Starting round	Final position	Pld	W	D	L	GF	GA	GD	Win %
Liga Portugal 2	12 August 2023	19 May 2024	Matchday 1		26	8	7	11	34	33	+1	30.77
Taça de Portugal	24 September 2023	7 February 2024	Second round	Quarter-finals	5	4	0	1	23	5	+18	80.00
Taça da Liga	24 July 2023	30 July 2023	First round	Second round	2	0	2	0	3	3	+0	0.00
Total					33	12	9	12	60	41	+19	36.36

Last updated: 16 March 2024
Source: Soccerway

=== Liga Portugal 2 ===
==== League table ====
Pos	Team	Pld	W	D	L	GF	GA	GD	Pts
10	Porto B (Note: Ineligible for promotion)	34	12	8	14	51	51	0	44 (Note: Ranked on head-to-head: Mafra 2–1 Porto B, Porto B 1–1 Mafra)
11	Académico de Viseu	34	9	16	9	36	38	−2	43
12	União de Leiria	34	11	9	14	44	40	+4	42
13	Penafiel	34	11	6	17	31	39	−8	39
14	Leixões	34	7	16	11	29	38	−9	37

Source: Liga Portugal 2
Rules for classification: 1) Points; 2) Head-to-head points; 3) Head-to-head goal difference; 4) Head-to-head away goals scored; 5) Goal difference; 6) Matches won; 7) Goals scored; 8) Play-off.

==== Results summary ====
Overall								Home						Away					
Pld	W	D	L	GF	GA	GD	Pts	W	D	L	GF	GA	GD	W	D	L	GF	GA	GD
26	8	7	11	34	33	+1	31	5	5	3	21	17	+4	3	2	8	13	16	−3

Last updated: 16 March 2024.
Source: Superliga

==== Results by round ====
Round	1
Ground	
Result	
Position	

Updated to match(es) played on 16 March 2024. Source: Superliga
A = Away; H = Home; W = Win; D = Draw; L = Loss

==== Matches ====
The league fixtures were unveiled on 5 July 2023.

	União de Leiria	v	Leiria
--:-- WET (UTC±0)			Stadium: Estádio Dr. Magalhães Pessoa

=== Taça de Portugal ===
24 September 023	ADRC Pedrógão de São Pedro	0–12	União de Leiria
--:-- WEST (UTC+1)

21 October 2023	Académico de Viseu	1–3	União de Leiria	Viseu
20:00 WEST (UTC+1)

26 November 2023	União de Leiria	5–0	AC Malveira	Leiria
15:00 WET (UTC±0)				Stadium: Estádio Dr. Magalhães Pessoa

=== Taça da Liga ===
24 July 2023 First round	Boavista	0–0 (4–5 p)	União de Leiria	Porto
--:-- WEST (UTC+1)				Stadium: Estádio do Bessa

30 July 2023 Second round	União de Leiria	3–3 (4–5 p)	Nacional	Leiria
--:-- WEST (UTC+1)				Stadium: Estádio Dr. Magalhães Pessoa
