= Roscello Vlijter =

Surinamese footballer (born 2000)

Personal information
- Full name: Roscello Rudelizio Vlijter
- Date of birth: 1 January 2000 (age 26)
- Place of birth: Paramaribo, Suriname
- Position: Midfielder

Youth career
- –2016: Robinhood
- 2016–2019: Feyenoord

Senior career*
Years	Team	Apps	(Gls)
2019–2022	Telstar	24	(1)
2022–2023	Peyia 2014	26	(0)
2023–2024	Hapoel Kfar Saba	14	(0)
2024–2025	Riteriai	18	(0)
2025	Transinvest	11	(0)
2026–	Notch		

International career^{‡}
- Suriname U15
2018	Suriname U20	4	(2)
2019–	Suriname	13	(0)
- * Club domestic league appearances and goals as of 12 January 2026 (UTC) ‡ National team caps and goals as of 16 November 2024

Roscello Rudelizio Vlijter (born 1 January 2000) is a Surinamese professional footballer who plays as a midfielder.

== Club career ==
=== Telstar ===
A product of the Feyenoord youth academy, Vlijter signed his first professional contract with Eerste Divisie club Telstar in June 2019. After having his passport stolen while on international duties, Vlijter could not return to the Netherlands to play for Telstar between September and October 2019. Partly due to missing practice and struggling to regain form, he did not make an appearance in his first season with the club.

On 11 December 2020, Vlijter made his professional debut, coming off the bench for the injured Siebe Vandermeulen in the 18th minute of a 3–2 loss to Almere City.

=== Years abroad ===
After a season at Peyia 2014, Vlijter joined Hapoel Kfar Saba in Israel. However after the war in the country broke out, both parties decided to terminate the contract and four months later Vlijter signed with I Lyga club Riteriai.

== Style of play ==
Upon joining Riteriai, Vlijter was described by technical director Vytautas Masaitis as a "highly technical" player, known for his unconventional solutions, exceptionally quick thinking, and excellent vision.

== Career statistics ==
=== Club ===
As of match played 12 January 2024

Appearances and goals by club, season and competition
Club	Season	League			Cup		Continental		Other		Total	
Club	Season	Division	Apps	Goals	Apps	Goals	Apps	Goals	Apps	Goals	Apps	Goals
Telstar	2019–20	Eerste Divisie	0	0	0	0	—		0	0	0	0
Telstar	2020–21	Eerste Divisie	6	0	0	0	—		0	0	6	0
Telstar	2021–22	Eerste Divisie	18	1	2	0	—		0	0	20	1
Telstar	Total		24	1	2	0	0	0	0	0	26	1
Peyia 2014	2022–23	Cypriot Second Division	26	0	1	0	—		0	0	27	0
Hapoel Kfar Saba	2023–24	Liga Leumit	14	0	0	0	—		0	0	14	0
Riteriai	2024	I Lyga	0	0	0	0	—		0	0	0	0
Career total			64	1	3	0	0	0	0	0	67	1

=== International ===
As of matches played 12 September 2023

National team	Year	Apps	Goals
Suriname	2019	3	0
Suriname	2022	5	0
Suriname	2023	4	0
Total		12	0

== Honours ==
Feyenoord U19

- Dutch Youth Cup U19: 2017–18
