= Pedro Marques =

Pedro Marques may refer to:

- Pedro Marques (footballer, born March 1998), Portuguese footballer
- Pedro Marques (footballer, born April 1998), Portuguese footballer
- Pedro Marques (footballer, born 1988), Portuguese footballer
- Pedro Marques (politician), (born 1976), Portuguese politician
