= Glynor Plet =

Dutch footballer (born 1987)

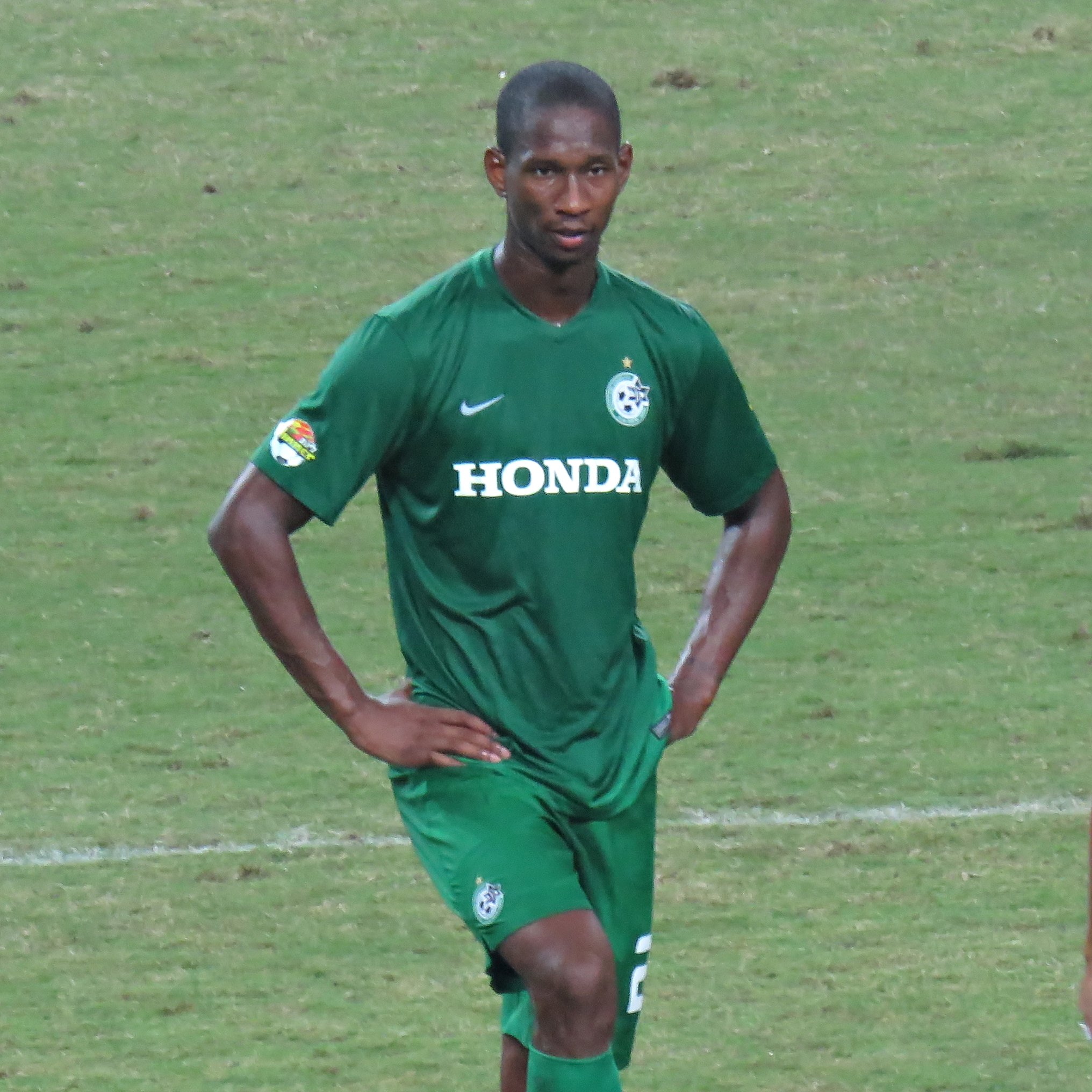
- Plet with Maccabi Haifa in 2015

Personal information
- Full name: Glynor Orvil Plet
- Date of birth: 30 January 1987 (age 39)
- Place of birth: Amsterdam, Netherlands
- Height: 1.94 m (6 ft 4 in)
- Position: Striker

Youth career
- 1992–1998: SC Voorland
- 1998–2000: Ajax
- 2000–2004: Haarlem
- 2004–2005: Argon

Senior career*
Years	Team	Apps	(Gls)
2005–2007	Den Bosch	18	(1)
2007–2008	Lisse	23	(19)
2008–2010	Telstar	73	(39)
2010–2012	Heracles Almelo	41	(17)
2012–2013	Twente	13	(2)
2012–2013	→ Genk (loan)	27	(10)
2013–2014	Hapoel Be'er Sheva	31	(11)
2014–2015	Zulte Waregem	18	(2)
2015	→ Go Ahead Eagles (loan)	13	(1)
2015–2017	Maccabi Haifa	38	(12)
2017–2019	Alanyaspor	10	(1)
2019–2023	Telstar	128	(50)
Total		433	(165)
- * Club domestic league appearances and goals

Glynor Orvil Plet (Dutch pronunciation: [ˈɡlaːinər ˈɔrvɪl plɛt]; born 30 January 1987) is a Dutch former professional footballer who played as a striker. He is the all-time top scorer and former captain of Telstar. Plet is noted for his physical strength, ability in the air, and ball retention.

After a turbulent youth career, where he alternated between playing for amateur and professional clubs, Plet made his professional debut in November 2005, aged 18, for Eerste Divisie club Den Bosch. Failing to break through, he moved to amateur club Lisse where he turned heads by becoming top goalscorer in the Hoofdklasse and winning the title with the club. He then signed his first professional contract with Telstar aged 21. After scoring 18 and 21 goals respectively in his two seasons at Telstar, he earned a move to Eredivisie club Heracles Almelo. In 2012, he joined Twente, before moving abroad and having stints of varying success with Genk, Hapoel Be'er Sheva, Zulte Waregem, Maccabi Haifa, and Alanyaspor.

In July 2019, Plet returned to Telstar, where he became the club's all-time leading goalscorer in May 2023. Despite Telstar's interest in renewing his contract, Plet decided not to continue at the club, and left in June 2023.

== Early life and personal life ==
Plet was born on 30 January 1987 in Amsterdam, Netherlands to parents of Surinamese descent. His name derives from the fictional title character, MacGyver, from the 1985 TV series MacGyver, in which his parents were fans.

== Career ==
=== Early years ===
Plet played for SC Voorland, Ajax, Haarlem and Argon, before joining FC Den Bosch in 2005. Plet had a tumultuous career early on: "Throughout my entire youth, I went back and forth between professional and amateur clubs. Starting with the youth team of Ajax, then to amateur clubs in Haarlem, and again to amateurs in Den Bosch. I was too impatient and I had to get playing time at all costs." During his time in the youth team of Haarlem, which was a professional club at the time, Plet spent four years there. However, at the age of 16, he made the unconventional decision to join the under-19 team of Hoofdklasse amateur club Argon. Initially, he had no interest in this move as his lifelong goal had always been to become a professional footballer, and transitioning from a professional club to an amateur one seemed counterintuitive. Nevertheless, his father and brother believed that Argon would provide better opportunities for him to showcase his talent. Haarlem never attracted any scouts, whereas Argon's under-19 team competed at a higher level against clubs like Ajax, Zwolle, and Emmen. Plet's father persisted, urging him to "listen to me for a year, give your all to football, and you'll see that it will work out."

=== Den Bosch ===
Taking his father's advice to heart, Plet gave his utmost dedication that season, and, after a year, he earned a move to professional club FC Den Bosch. Driven by impatience and a relentless pursuit for playing time, he resorted to signing an amateur contract with Den Bosch. This commitment required him to commute daily from Amsterdam to 's-Hertogenbosch, even incurring financial costs to participate in his sport.

At Den Bosch, Plet initially joined the under-19 team but quickly progressed to training with the senior squad. He made his professional debut for the latter on 6 November 2005, replacing Prince Rajcomar in the 89th minute of a 2–0 loss to Stormvogels Telstar in the Eerste Divisie. On 6 April 2007, he scored his first professional goal, shortly after coming off the bench, in another away loss to Stormvogels Telstar. However, due to the presence of fellow striker Frank Demouge, Plet was primarily limited to substitute appearances. Following Demouge's departure to Willem II, head coach Theo Bos chose Koen van der Biezen as the team's first-choice striker. Despite gaining first-team experience, Plet departed the club after consultation with his father and agent, due to the fact that he was on an amateur contract and in need for financial independence. Plet scored once in 18 appearances for the club in the Eerste Divisie.

In the 2007–08 season, Plet joined amateur club Lisse in the Saturday Hoofdklasse A. Plet took on a daytime job with a sponsor while practicing in the evenings. Reflecting on that period, the striker acknowledged its positive impact, stating, "That year was good for me. I earned my own money, which boosted my self-worth." The team experienced a successful season in sporting terms with Plet being a key player for them, scoring 19 goals in 23 matches and helping them to the national amateur title.

=== Telstar ===
In July 2008, Plet signed a two-year contract with Eerste Divisie club Telstar, marking his return to professional football. He scored on his debut for the club on 8 August 2008, the first matchday of the season, securing a 1–0 away victory against Excelsior.

In the 2009–10 season, Plet was one of the revelations in the Eerste Divisie. Partly because of the many goals he made for the club, Telstar won the period title for the first time since 1979. In his two seasons in the Eerste Divisie, he had scored 18 and 21 goals respectively – the latter being a club record. Go Ahead Eagles initially expressed interest for him, followed by Cambuur. However, Plet was reluctant to continue playing in the Eerste Divisie, feeling he had accomplished what he could in that competition. His aspiration was to reach the Eredivisie, the top tier of Dutch football, as he had invested years of effort into his development. Plet's mindset was clear: "Place me at an Eredivisie club, and I will accept guidance from the people there to improve myself." Consequently, he stayed at Telstar for an opportunity with an Eredivisie club. Confident in his abilities, he believed that there would always be a club in need of a striker like himself, stating, "There are plenty of clubs worldwide; there is always one that needs a forward like me." At the time of leaving the club in May 2010, the then 23-year-old striker had played 73 league matches for Telstar, scoring 39 goals.

=== Heracles Almelo ===
On 27 May 2010, Glynor Plet signed a three-year contract with an option for another year with Eredivisie club Heracles Almelo to succeed Bas Dost, who had left to Heerenveen. Plet scored two goals for Heracles on his Eredivisie debut against Willem II in a 3–0 home victory on 7 August 2010. He scored a total of seven goals in 22 matches in his first season for the club, before adding 10 goals in 19 matches in the 2011–12 season.

=== Twente ===
Plet joined Eredivisie rivals Twente on 31 January 2012, signing a three-and-a-half-year contract. He was supposed to succeed Marc Janko as the competitor of Luuk de Jong. He made his debut for the club against his former club, Heracles, on 10 February 2012. However, he failed to meet expectations at Twente and was told he could leave the club in the summer of 2012, scoring six goals in 22 appearances during his time there.

==== Genk (loan) ====
On 31 August 2012, Plet was sent on a one-season loan to Belgian Pro League club Genk. At Genk, Plet took on the role of a supersub, starting only eight out of 27 league matches, but still managing to score ten league goals. Plet's impact was also extended to the UEFA Europa League, where he scored crucial late equalisers against Sporting CP (group stage) and VfB Stuttgart (round of 32), resulting in 1–1 draws.

During that season, Plet also achieved success with Genk by winning the Belgian Cup. The team secured victories over notable opponents such as Standard Liège, Zulte Waregem, and Anderlecht. In the first cup round against third division team Union SG, Plet contributed to the 6–0 victory by scoring a header to double the score. However, he did not find the net again throughout the cup campaign. Despite missing his penalty in the shootout during the semifinals against Anderlecht, Genk progressed and ultimately emerged as the cup winners in the final against Cercle Brugge.

In his final appearance for Genk, Plet reached a significant milestone by scoring his 100th career goal. He netted the 1–1 equaliser against Sporting Lokeren, and also provided the assist for the winning goal, proving himself decisive in the 2–1 victory. After discussions between Genk and Twente, it was decided that Plet, despite his total tally of 13 goals, would return to Twente. His contract was terminated by Twente on 1 September.

=== Hapoel Be'er Sheva ===
Plet signed a two-year contract with Israeli Premier League club Hapoel Be'er Sheva on 23 September 2013. On 9 February 2014, Plet scored the equalising goal in the 34th minute, a strike from distance, in a 3–1 loss to Maccabi Tel Aviv. In May 2014, his strike was chosen as Goal of the Year by the Israeli television channel, Channel 1. With Hapoel Be'er Sheva, Plet secured a spot in the UEFA Europa League by finishing in second place in the league.

=== Zulte Waregem ===
On 9 July 2014, Plet returned to Belgium by signing with Zulte Waregem, having previously enjoyed considerable success with Genk. He made his debut on 17 July, in the first leg of the Europa League's second qualifying round against Zawisza Bydgoszcz (2–1). Notably, Plet marked his debut by scoring the opening goal. In the return leg, he scored again, contributing to a 3–1 victory.

Plet's first appearance in the league for Zulte Waregem occurred on 27 July, in a home match against Kortrijk, which ended in a 2–0 win for Waregem. On 10 August 2014, Plet scored his first league goal for Essevee in a 1–1 draw against Club Brugge, finishing off a cross from Aleksandar Trajkovski. However, Zulte Waregem had a challenging start to the season, resulting in the team's decline to lower positions in the league standings. During this period, Plet managed to score only one additional league goal, leading coach Francky Dury to relegate him to the bench. In January 2015, Plet was informed that he was free to explore opportunities with other clubs. He scored twice in 18 appearances for Zulte Waregem.

==== Go Ahead Eagles (loan) ====
On 29 January 2015, Plet was sent on loan to Eredivisie side Go Ahead Eagles for the rest of the season. He suffered relegation to the Eerste Divisie with the club at the end of the season. He managed to score only once during his time at Go Ahead, in a 2–1 away loss to Dordrecht.

=== Maccabi Haifa ===
On 7 September 2015, Plet returned to Israel and signed a two-year contract with Maccabi Haifa. On 12 September, he made his debut against Bnei Sakhnin, coming on as a substitute for Ofir Kriaf in the 69th minute. However, he was sent off in injury time after elbowing opposing centre-back Abraham Paz in the back of the head. As a result, he received a three-game suspension by the Israel Football Association's tribunal. On 24 October, he made his second appearance for the team and scored his first goal in a 4–0 victory against Hapoel Acre. On 4 January 2016, he scored in a match against his former side, Hapoel Be'er Sheva, but later on also received a red card for the second time that season, after a foul on opposing goalkeeper Dudu Goresh. During the Israel State Cup semi-final, also against Hapoel Be'er Sheva, he scored a brace within two minutes, but later fell out due to an injury, as his team eventually won 3–1. Maccabi Haifa progressed and won the cup after a 1–0 victory over Maccabi Tel Aviv in the final.

Plet played one and a half years for Maccabi Haifa, scoring 12 goals and assisting four in 33 appearances for the Greens.

=== Alanyaspor ===
On 10 January 2017, Plet signed with Turkish Süper Lig club Alanyaspor on a two-and-a-half-year deal. Shortly after signing, manager Hüseyin Kalpar, who had signed Plet, was dismissed, and his replacements had no place for him in their team. As a result, Plet played his final competitive match for Alanyaspor on 22 May 2017. He decided to stay and honour his contract despite the club wanting to ship him elsewhere. Plet appeared for training every day, despite being only rarely selected to play.

During his two-and-a-half-year stint with Alanyaspor, Plet scored once in 10 total appearances, of which he started in nine games.

=== Return to Telstar ===
In July 2019, Plet returned to his former club Telstar on a two-year contract. New Telstar head coach Andries Jonker was pleased with Plet's return to the club: "With Glynor, we are bringing in a player with a lot of experience and quality. In a young group, it is important to have guys like Glynor who know what it takes to live as a professional footballer. The qualities that Glynor brings with him make us as staff confident in his added value, and I am very happy that we have been able to secure Glynor for two seasons."

Plet immediately scored on his return debut for the club on 23 August 2019, the final goal of a 3–0 league victory against Excelsior after coming on as a 79th-minute substitute for Reda Kharchouch.

On 13 May 2023, Plet became Telstar's all-time leading goalscorer, scoring in a 2–1 league loss to MVV, after having shortly shared the title with Sander Oostrom. At that point, he had decided not to renew his contract with Telstar, despite the club expressing their hope of signing the 36-year-old Plet to a new deal. He left Telstar at the end of his contract in June 2023, still undecided on whether he would continue or retire. In July 2023, he had decided not to rejoin Telstar, expressing a desire to pursue a career as a sports agent while continuing to play, preferably for another professional club.

On 24 May 2024, Plet and Frank Korpershoek played a testimonial match to raise funds for Spieren voor Spieren, a charity dedicated to financing research into neuromuscular diseases. Plet scored a hat-trick in a 6–2 win, with former teammates and coaches paying tribute to him.

== Style of play ==
Given his relatively late breakthrough into professional football, Plet has often been described as a late bloomer, having signed his first professional contract with Telstar at the age of 21. Described as a powerful figure, Plet is mainly utilised as a striker. In attack, he uses his physicality and technique to hold the ball and create opportunities for overlapping teammates, and has been described as a typical target man. He is an aerial threat due to his tall stature (1.94 m or 6 ft 4 in).

== Career statistics ==
Appearances and goals by club, season and competition
Club	Season	League			National cup (Note: Includes KNVB Cup, Belgian Cup, Israel State Cup)		League cup (Note: Includes Toto Cup)		Europe		Other		Total	
Club	Season	Division	Apps	Goals	Apps	Goals	Apps	Goals	Apps	Goals	Apps	Goals	Apps	Goals
Den Bosch	2005–06	Eerste Divisie	6	0	0	0	—		—		—		6	0
Den Bosch	2006–07	Eerste Divisie	12	1	0	0	—		—		0	0	12	1
Den Bosch	Total		18	1	0	0	—		—		0	0	18	1
Lisse	2007–08	Hoofdklasse	23	19	2	1	—		—		—		25	20
Telstar	2008–09	Eerste Divisie	37	18	2	0	—		—		2 (Note: Appearances in Eredivisie promotion/relegation playoffs)	0	41	18
Telstar	2009–10	Eerste Divisie	36	21	1	0	—		—		—		37	21
Telstar	Total		73	39	3	0	—		—		2	0	76	39
Heracles Almelo	2010–11	Eredivisie	22	7	2	1	—		—		2 (Note: Appearances in Eredivisie European play-offs)	1	26	9
Heracles Almelo	2011–12	Eredivisie	19	10	3	4	—		—		—		22	14
Heracles Almelo	Total		41	17	5	5	—		—		2	1	47	23
Twente	2011–12	Eredivisie	13	2	0	0	—		3 (Note: Appearances in UEFA Europa League)	0	1	0	17	2
Twente	2012–13	Eredivisie	0	0	0	0	—		5	4	—		5	4
Twente	Total		13	2	0	0	—		8	4	1	0	22	6
Genk (loan)	2012–13	Belgian Pro League	27	10	7	1	—		8	2	—		42	13
Hapoel Be'er Sheva	2013–14	Ligat Ha'Al	31	11	2	2	0	0	—		—		33	13
Zulte Waregem	2014–15	Belgian Pro League	18	2	3	2	—		3	3	—		24	7
Go Ahead (loan)	2014–15	Eredivisie	13	1	0	0	—		—		2	0	15	1
Maccabi Haifa	2015–16	Ligat Ha'Al	25	9	4	5	2	0	—		—		31	14
Maccabi Haifa	2016–17	Ligat Ha'Al	13	3	1	0	3	1	0	0	—		17	4
Maccabi Haifa	Total		38	12	5	5	5	1	0	0	—		48	18
Alanyaspor	2016–17	Süper Lig	10	1	0	0	—		—		—		10	1
Alanyaspor	2017–18	Süper Lig	0	0	0	0	—		—		—		0	0
Alanyaspor	2018–19	Süper Lig	0	0	0	0	—		—		—		0	0
Alanyaspor	Total		10	1	0	0	—		—		—		10	1
Telstar	2019–20	Eerste Divisie	21	7	2	0	—		—		—		23	7
Telstar	2020–21	Eerste Divisie	35	19	1	0	—		—		—		36	19
Telstar	2021–22	Eerste Divisie	36	13	2	1	—		—		—		38	14
Telstar	2022–23	Eerste Divisie	36	11	2	0	—		—		—		38	11
Telstar	Total		128	50	5	1	—		—		—		133	51
Career total			433	165	32	17	5	1	19	9	7	1	496	193

== Honours ==
Lisse

- Hoofdklasse: 2007–08

Genk

- Belgian Cup: 2012–13

Maccabi Haifa

- Israel State Cup: 2015–16
