= Anass Najah =

Dutch footballer (born 1997)

Personal information
- Date of birth: 16 September 1997 (age 29)
- Place of birth: Utrecht, Netherlands
- Height: 1.70 m (5 ft 7 in)
- Position: Midfielder

Team information
- Current team: Al-Orobah
- Number: 21

Youth career
- 2004–2009: USV Elinkwijk
- 2009–2010: Den Bosch
- 2010–2013: VV De Meern
- 2013–2014: Willem II/RKC Waalwijk
- 2014–2016: Brabant United

Senior career*
Years	Team	Apps	(Gls)
2016–2017	RKC Waalwijk	1	(0)
2017–2021	Telstar	119	(3)
2021–2022	Akritas Chlorakas		
2022–2023	Telstar	37	(0)
2023–2024	Sabail	34	(0)
2024–2025	De Graafschap	32	(0)
2025–	Al-Orobah	0	(0)
- * Club domestic league appearances and goals as of 11 May 2025

Anass Najah (born 16 September 1997) is a Dutch professional footballer who plays as a midfielder for Saudi Arabian club Al-Orobah. Born in the Netherlands, he is of Moroccan descent.

== Club career ==
He made his professional debut in the Eerste Divisie for RKC Waalwijk on 4 November 2016 in a game against FC Den Bosch.

For the 2022–23 season, Najah returned to Telstar after a season in Cyprus with Akritas Chlorakas.

On 8 August 2023, Najah joined Azerbaijan Premier League club Sabail on a one-year deal. He made his debut for the club on 14 August, replacing goalscorer Pedro Nuno in a 1–1 draw against Neftçi. On 3 September, he made his first start for Dənizçilər, helping his team to a 3–1 victory against defending champions Qarabağ.

On 29 August 2024, Najah signed a two-year contract with De Graafschap. He made his debut for the club on 1 September, starting in a 4–1 away win over Roda JC.

On 12 August 2025, Najah joined Saudi FDL club Al-Orobah.

== Personal life ==
Born in the Netherlands, Najah is of Moroccan descent. He is the younger brother of Imad Najah.
