= Siebe Vandermeulen =

Belgian footballer (born 2001)

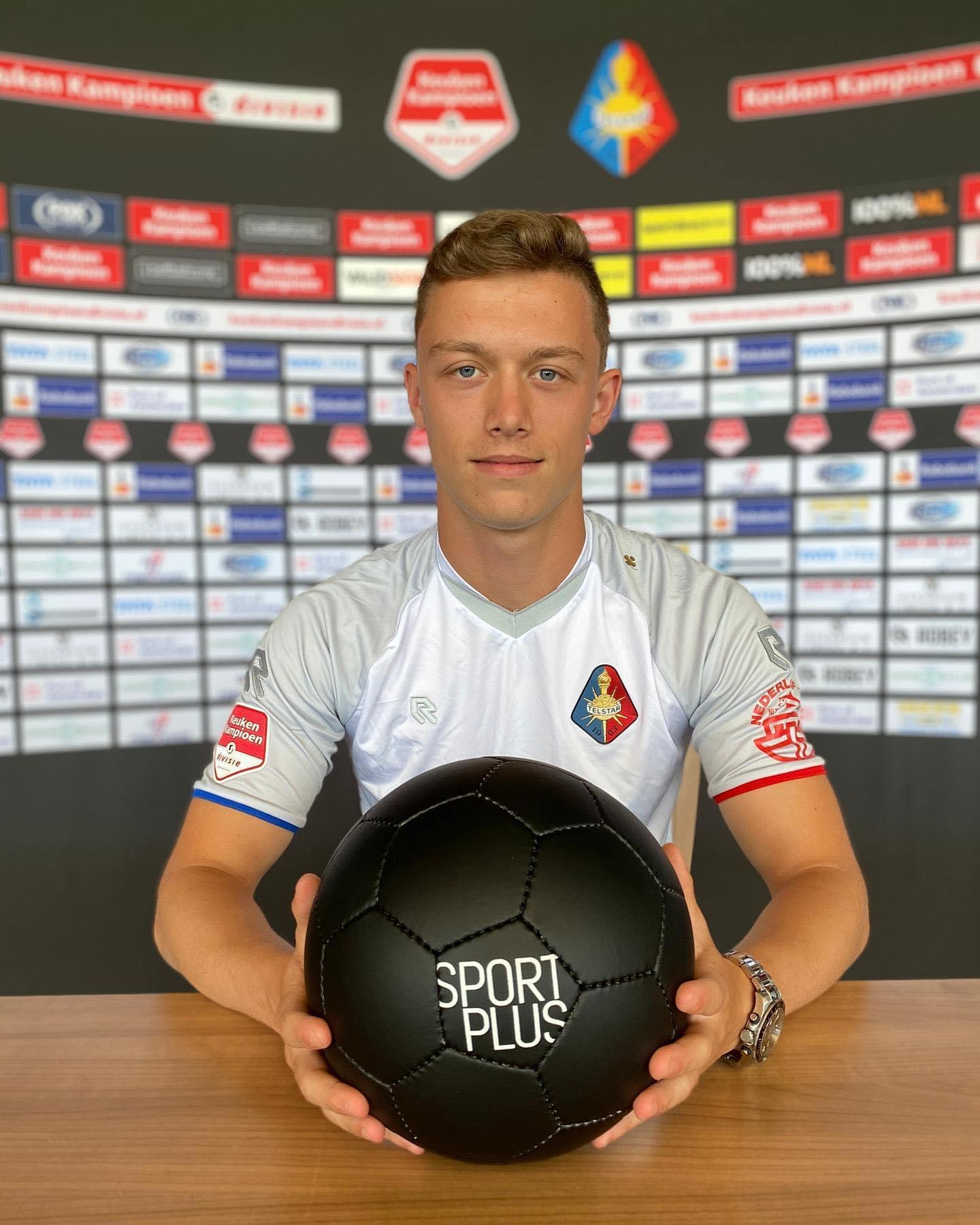

Personal information
- Date of birth: 2 January 2001 (age 25)
- Place of birth: Tienen, Belgium
- Height: 1.79 m (5 ft 10 in)
- Position: Right-back

Team information
- Current team: Tongeren
- Number: 19

Youth career
- Racing Butsel
- –2014: OH Leuven
- 2014–2020: Genk

Senior career*
Years	Team	Apps	(Gls)
2020–2022	Telstar	38	(0)
2022–2023	Zébra Élites Charleroi	23	(1)
2023–2025	Sporting Hasselt	11	(0)
2025–	Tongeren	0	(0)

International career
2015–2016	Belgium U15	6	(2)
2016–2017	Belgium U16	12	(1)
2017–2018	Belgium U17	13	(1)
2018–2019	Belgium U18	7	(0)
2019–2020	Belgium U19	9	(0)
- * Club domestic league appearances and goals as of 22 January 2026

Siebe Vandermeulen (born 2 January 2001) is a Belgian footballer who plays as a right-back for Tongeren.

== Club career ==
On 5 August 2022, Vandermeulen signed with Sporting Charleroi and was assigned to their Under-23 squad, Zébra Élites Charleroi. In July 2023, Vandermeulen moved to Sporting Hasselt.

== Career statistics ==
=== Club ===
As of 15 September 2020.

Club	Season	League			Cup		Continental		Other		Total	
Club	Season	Division	Apps	Goals	Apps	Goals	Apps	Goals	Apps	Goals	Apps	Goals
Telstar	2020–21	Eerste Divisie	2	0	0	0	–		0	0	2	0
Career total			2	0	0	0	0	0	0	0	2	0
