= Anthony Berenstein =

Dutch footballer (born 1997)

Personal information
- Date of birth: 2 March 1997 (age 29)
- Place of birth: Amsterdam, Netherlands
- Height: 1.80 m (5 ft 11 in)
- Position: Left-back

Youth career
- –2009: Zeeburgia
- 2009–2016: Utrecht

Senior career*
Years	Team	Apps	(Gls)
2016–2017	Dordrecht	8	(0)
2017	Magreb '90	8	(0)
2018–2019	Volendam	40	(5)
2019–2022	Telstar	55	(1)
2022–2023	GVVV	21	(2)

International career
2012	Netherlands U15	1	(0)
2013	Netherlands U16	3	(1)
2013–2014	Netherlands U17	13	(3)
- * Club domestic league appearances and goals as of 07:54, 28 January 2024 (UTC)

Anthony Berenstein (born 2 March 1997) is a Dutch professional footballer who plays as a left-back for amateur side Unicum Lelystad.

== Club career ==
He made his professional debut in the Eerste Divisie for FC Dordrecht on 5 August 2016 in a game against FC Oss. He afterwards played for Magreb '90.

In February 2018, Berenstein signed with FC Volendam after a successful trial, initially joining the reserve team. He made his debut for the first team on 30 March 2018 in a 2–2 draw against Cambuur, in which he scored his first goal.

Berenstein joined Telstar in May 2019, signing a one-year contract with an option for two more years. He made his competitive debut for the club on 16 August 2019 on the second matchday of the Eerste Divisie season, starting in a 1–0 away win over FC Den Bosch.

On 26 July 2022, Berenstein signed a one-year contract with Derde Divisie club GVVV. He later played for Batavia '90 and joined Unicum Lelystad in 2025.

== International career ==
Born in the Netherlands, Berenstein is of Surinamese descent. He represented Netherlands national under-17 football team at the 2014 UEFA European Under-17 Championship, where Netherlands were the runner-up.
