= Richelor Sprangers =

Haitian footballer (born 1998)

Personal information
- Date of birth: February 10, 1998 (age 28)
- Place of birth: Port-au-Prince, Haiti
- Height: 1.84 m (6 ft 0 in)
- Position: Winger

Team information
- Current team: SC Kruisland

Youth career
- 2008–: RKVV DIA
- 2008–2016: NAC Breda

Senior career*
Years	Team	Apps	(Gls)
2016–2019	NAC Breda	10	(0)
2018–2019	→ Helmond Sport (loan)	22	(3)
2019–2021	Telstar	15	(0)
2021–	SC Kruisland	0	(0)

International career^{‡}
2016	Haiti U-20	3	(0)
2017–	Haiti	4	(0)
- * Club domestic league appearances and goals as of 11 December 2020 ‡ National team caps and goals as of 20 November 2018

Richelor Sprangers (born 10 February 1998) is a Haitian football player who plays for Dutch club SC Kruisland. He also holds Dutch citizenship.

== Club career ==
He made his professional debut in the Eerste Divisie for NAC Breda on 25 November 2016 in a game against SC Cambuur.

== International career ==
Sprangers made his debut for the senior Haiti national football team in a 3-3 2017 Kirin Challenge Cup tie with Japan on 10 October 2017.

== Personal life ==
Sprangers was adopted by a Dutch couple when he was 4.
