= Shayne Pattynama =

Indonesian footballer (born 1998)

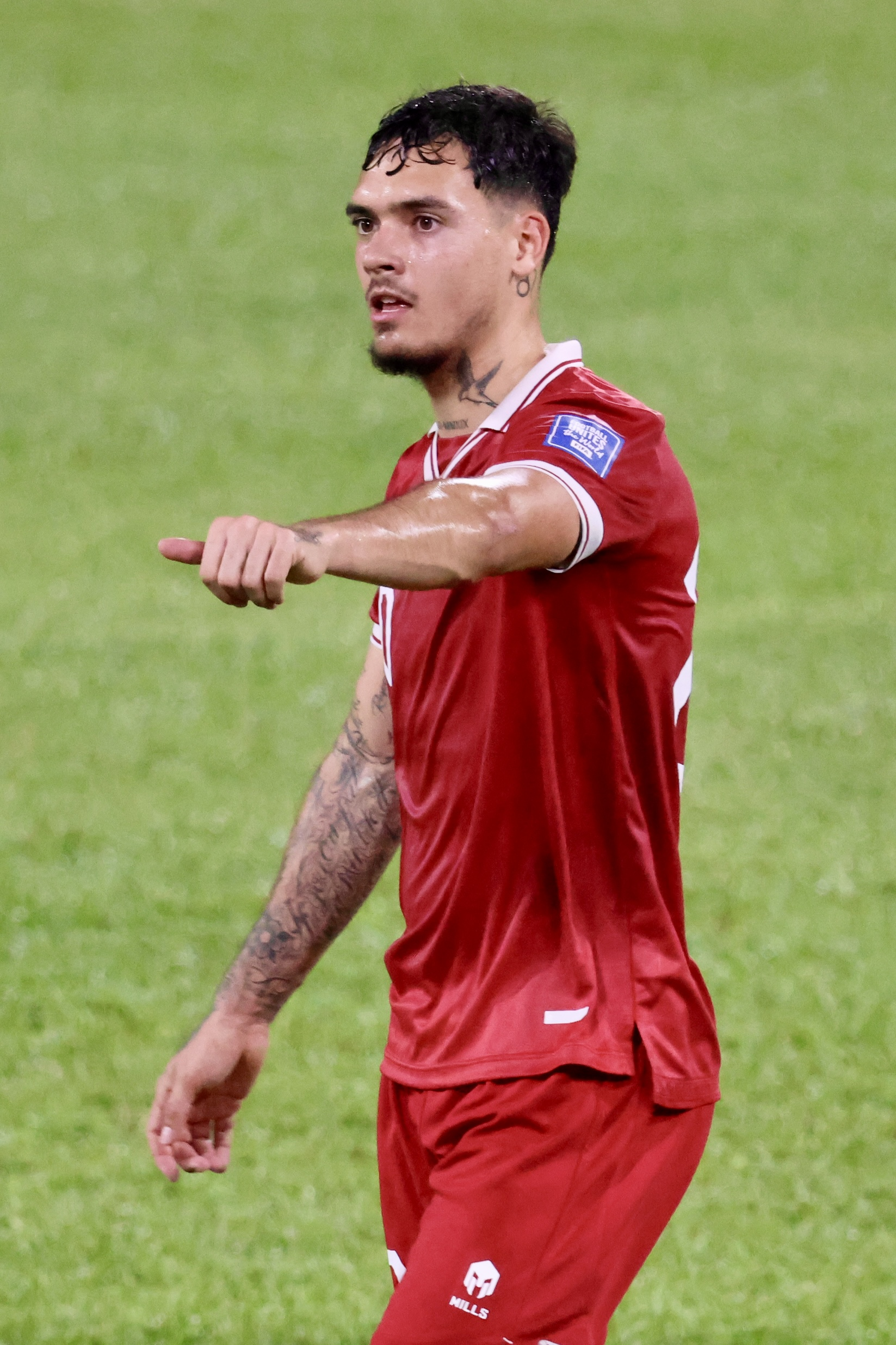
- Pattynama playing for Indonesia in 2023

Personal information
- Full name: Shayne Elian Jay Pattynama
- Date of birth: 11 August 1998 (age 28)
- Place of birth: Lelystad, Netherlands
- Height: 1.85 m (6 ft 1 in)
- Positions: Left-back; left wing-back; centre-back

Team information
- Current team: Persija Jakarta
- Number: 25

Youth career
- 2004–2007: SV Lelystad '67
- 2007–2010: Ajax
- 2010–2017: Jong Utrecht

Senior career*
Years	Team	Apps	(Gls)
2017–2019	Jong Utrecht	41	(1)
2019–2021	Telstar	45	(5)
2021–2024	Viking	70	(3)
2024–2025	Eupen	22	(0)
2025–2026	Buriram United	6	(0)
2026–	Persija Jakarta	6	(0)

International career^{‡}
2023–	Indonesia	18	(2)
Medal record
Men's football
Representing Indonesia
FIFA ASEAN Cup
Winner	2026 Indonesia	Team
- * Club domestic league appearances and goals as of 5 April 2026 ‡ National team caps and goals as of 5 October 2026

Shayne Elian Jay Pattynama (born 11 August 1998) is a professional footballer who plays as a left-back or left wing-back for Super League club Persija Jakarta. Born in the Netherlands, he plays for the Indonesia national team.

== Club career ==
=== Jong Utrecht ===
He made his Eerste Divisie debut for Jong Utrecht on 21 August 2017 in a game against TOP Oss. He scored his first and only goal for Jong Utrecht on 11 February 2019, in a 2–4 home loss to Go Ahead Eagles.

=== SC Telstar ===
After two seasons, he moved to league rivals Telstar, in 2019. Pattynama made his debut on 18 October 2019 in a match against Almere City. On 18 January 2020, He scored his first goal for Telstar in a 3–3 draw over Excelsior Rotterdam at the Van Donge & De Roo Stadion, Rotterdam.

=== Viking FK ===
Pattynama signed with Norwegian Eliteserien club Viking on 16 March 2021. He was set to join the team on 1 April. He scored his first goal for the club on 13 June 2021 against Vålerenga in a 4–1 win. A few months later, on 26 September 2021, he scored his second goal against Molde in a 2–2 draw.

In December 2023, Viking FK announced that Pattynama would depart the club at the end of the 2023 campaign, having chosen not to renew his contract.

=== Eupen ===
On 1 February 2024, Pattynama officially signed a two-and-a-half-year deal with Belgian Pro League club K.A.S. Eupen.

On 8 May 2025, Pattynama terminated his contract with Eupen by mutual agreement.

=== Buriram United ===
On July 7, 2025, Buriram United officially announced Pattynama as their new player.

He made his official debut on 16 August 2025 in the first week of the Thai League 1, playing the full 90 minutes in a 3–2 away win over Lamphun Warriors.

=== Persija Jakarta ===
On 23 January 2026, Pattynama moved to Indonesia Super League club Persija Jakarta.

== International career ==
In May 2022, it was announced that Pattynama had decided to represent Indonesia. On 14 March 2023, Pattynama received a call-up from Indonesia coach Shin Tae-yong for two friendlies against Burundi. However, Pattynama withdrew from the squad owing to inadequacies in the process of transferring the player's federation.

On 27 May 2023, Pattynama received call-up to the Indonesian national team for the friendly matches against Palestine and Argentina. On 19 June 2023, Pattynama made his debut match against Argentina in a 0–2 loss.

On 16 November 2023, Pattynama scored his first international goal for Indonesia against Iraq during the 2026 FIFA World Cup qualifiers in a 5–1 loss.

Shayne was a member of the Indonesia squad that reached the knockout stage of the 2023 AFC Asian Cup. Shayne would only play the game against Australia in the round of 16.

== Personal life ==
Born in the Netherlands, Pattynama is of Indonesian descent through his Moluccan father.

On 24 January 2023, Pattynama officially obtained Indonesian citizenship.

== Career statistics ==
=== Club ===
As of match played 5 April 2026

Appearances and goals by club, season and competition
Club	Season	League			National Cup (Note: Includes KNVB Cup, NM Cup, Belgian Cup, Thailand FA Cup)		Continental		Other		Total	
Club	Season	Division	Apps	Goals	Apps	Goals	Apps	Goals	Apps	Goals	Apps	Goals
Jong Utrecht	2017–18	Eerste Divisie	17	0	—		—		—		17	0
Jong Utrecht	2018–19	Eerste Divisie	24	1	—		—		—		24	1
Jong Utrecht	Total		41	1	—		—		—		41	1
Telstar	2019–20	Eerste Divisie	18	1	2	0	—		—		20	1
Telstar	2020–21	Eerste Divisie	27	4	1	0	—		—		28	4
Telstar	Total		45	5	3	0	—		—		48	5
Viking	2021	Eliteserien	24	2	5	0	—		—		29	2
Viking	2022	Eliteserien	18	0	4	0	6 (Note: Appearances in UEFA Conference League)	0	—		28	0
Viking	2023	Eliteserien	28	1	4	0	—		—		32	1
Viking	Total		70	3	13	0	6	0	—		89	3
Eupen	2023–24	Belgian Pro League	6	0	0	0	—		—		6	0
Eupen	2024–25	Challenger Pro League	16	0	1	0	—		—		17	0
Eupen	Total		22	0	1	0	0	0	—		23	0
Buriram United	2025–26	Thai League 1	6	0	1	0	3 (Note: Appearances in AFC Champions League Elite)	0	0	0	10	0
Persija Jakarta	2025–26	Super League	6	0	—		—		—		6	0
Career total			190	10	17	0	9	0	0	0	217	9

=== International ===
As of match played 5 October 2026

Appearances and goals by national team and year
National team	Year	Apps	Goals
Indonesia	2023	5	1
Indonesia	2024	6	0
Indonesia	2025	2	0
Indonesia	2026	5	1
Total		18	2

As of match played 5 October 2026
Indonesia score listed first, score column indicates score after each Pattynama goal

List of international goals scored by Shayne Pattynama
No.	Date	Venue	Cap	Opponent	Score	Result	Competition
1	16 November 2023	Basra International Stadium, Basra, Iraq	4	Iraq	1–2	1–5	2026 FIFA World Cup qualification
2	31 July 2026	Chonburi Stadium, Chonburi, Thailand	15	Timor-Leste	1–0	3–0	2026 ASEAN Championship

== Honours ==
Indonesia

- FIFA ASEAN Cup: 2026

== See also ==
- List of Indonesia international footballers born outside Indonesia
