= Benaissa Benamar =

Moroccan footballer (born 1997)

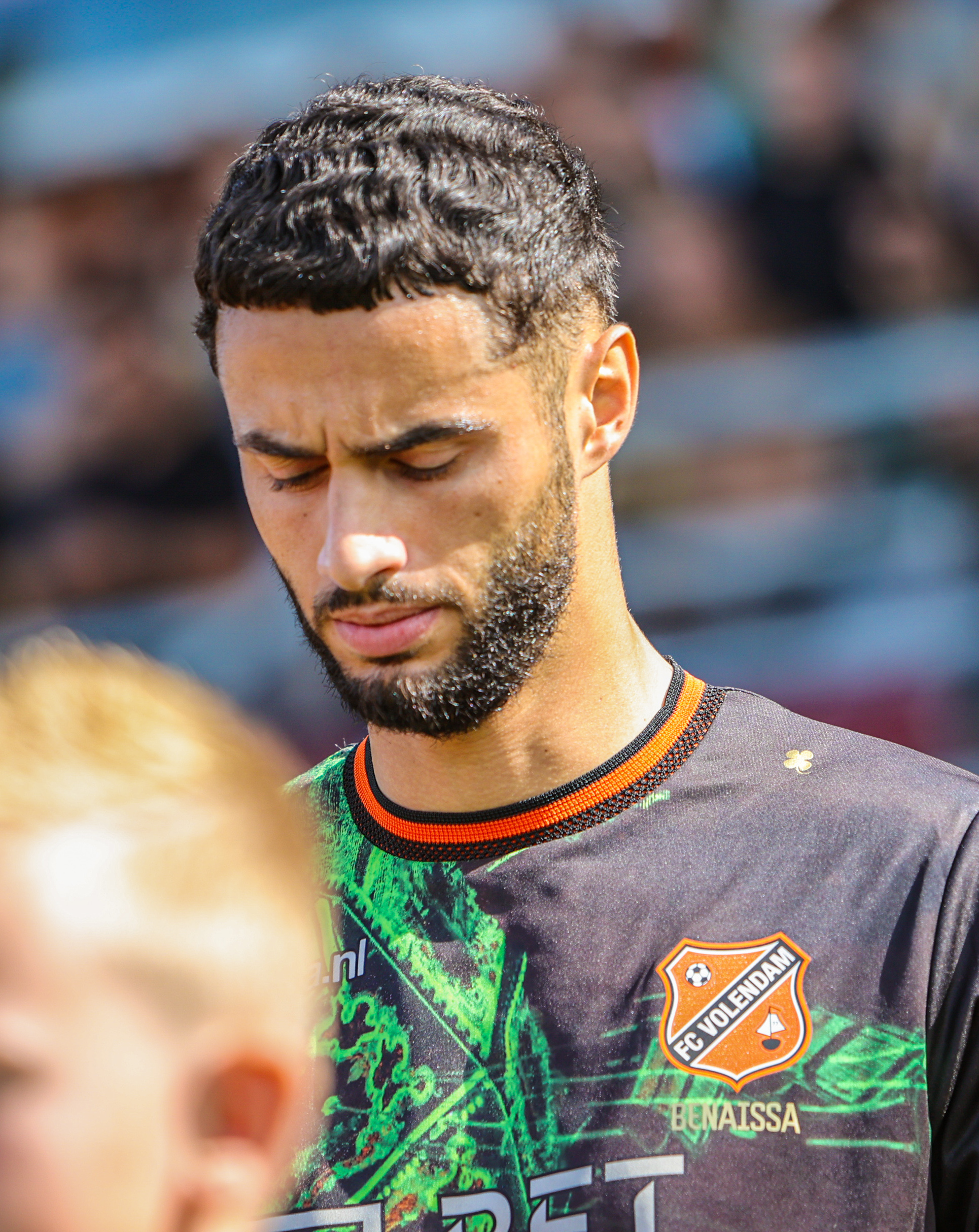
- Benamar in 2023

Personal information
- Date of birth: 8 April 1997 (age 29)
- Place of birth: Amsterdam, Netherlands
- Height: 1.91 m (6 ft 3 in)
- Position: Centre-back

Team information
- Current team: CSKA 1948
- Number: 5

Youth career
- –2006: VVA/Spartaan
- 2006–2009: Ajax
- 2009–2012: AFC
- 2012–2014: Volendam
- 2014–2015: Zeeburgia
- 2015–2016: ADO Den Haag

Senior career*
Years	Team	Apps	(Gls)
2016–2018	Jong Twente	38	(1)
2018–2019	IR Tanger	9	(0)
2019–2021	Telstar	39	(3)
2021–2022	Utrecht	5	(0)
2022	→ Volendam (loan)	9	(0)
2022–2024	Volendam	62	(6)
2024–2025	Raja Casablanca	14	(0)
2025–	CSKA 1948	7	(2)

International career
	Morocco U23	2	(0)
- * Club domestic league appearances and goals as of 03:20, 31 October 2026 (UTC)

Benaissa Benamar (Arabic: بنعيسى بنعمر; born 8 April 1997) is a professional footballer who plays as a centre-back for Bulgarian First League club CSKA 1948. Born in the Netherlands, he has represented Morocco at youth level.

== Club career ==
=== Early years ===
Benamar played in the youth departments of Dutch clubs VVA/Spartaan, Ajax, AFC, Volendam, Zeeburgia and ADO Den Haag. Between 2016 and 2018, he played for Jong FC Twente, the second-team of FC Twente with whom he suffered relegation from the Tweede Divisie to the Derde Divisie in his first season.

In 2018, Jong FC Twente was removed from the Dutch football pyramid, and Benamar left for Moroccan club Ittihad Tanger. At Ittihad, he made six appearances in the top-tier Botola Pro 1, and also played in the CAF Champions League and CAF Confederation Cup.

=== Telstar ===
In 2019, Benamar signed a two-year contract with Dutch second-tier Eerste Divisie club SC Telstar after a successful trial. He immediately established himself as a starter in defense and made 28 appearances during the 2019–20 season, in which he scored three goals. In September 2020, Italian Serie A club Sassuolo showed their interest in signing Benamar, but ultimately could not agree with Telstar on a transfer sum.

=== Utrecht ===
On 6 January 2021, it was announced that Benamar had signed a two-year contract with FC Utrecht, with an option for two additional years.

=== Volendam ===
On 13 January 2022, Benamar returned to Volendam on loan until the end of the season. The loan had a conditional obligation to buy in case of Volendam's promotion to Eredivisie. Volendam were promoted at the end of the 2021–22 season, triggering the option.

Benamar scored on his Eredivisie debut for Volendam, heading in a corner from Daryl van Mieghem to secure the 2–2 final score on the first matchday of the 2022–23 season.

On 2 September 2024, Benamar's contract with Volendam was terminated by mutual consent.

=== Raja Casablanca ===
On 19 September 2024, Benamar signed a two-year contract with Raja Casablanca.

== Honours ==
Individual

- Eredivisie Team of the Month: October 2023
