= Jelle Duin =

Dutch footballer (born 1999)

Personal information
- Date of birth: 27 January 1999 (age 27)
- Place of birth: Heemstede, Netherlands
- Height: 1.86 m (6 ft 1 in)
- Position: Forward

Team information
- Current team: Vejle
- Number: 9

Youth career
- Koninklijke HFC
- –2010: HFC Haarlem
- 2010–2016: AZ

Senior career*
Years	Team	Apps	(Gls)
2016–2022	Jong AZ	69	(14)
2019–2020	→ Volendam (loan)	14	(5)
2020	→ MVV (loan)	8	(2)
2021–2023	AZ	5	(0)
2022–2023	→ AGF (loan)	15	(3)
2023–2025	Hapoel Jerusalem	37	(7)
2025–	Vejle	8	(1)

International career
2014–2016	Netherlands U16	3	(0)
2016–2018	Netherlands U19	10	(2)
- * Club domestic league appearances and goals as of 19 May 2026

Jelle Duin (born 27 January 1999) is a Dutch professional footballer who plays as forward for Danish Superliga club Vejle.

== Club career ==
=== AZ ===
Duin played in the youth of Koninklijke HFC, HFC Haarlem and AZ. With the second team of AZ, Jong AZ, Duin became champion of the third-tier Tweede Divisie in the 2016–17 season, which secured promotion to the second-tier, professional Eerste Divisie. He made his debut for Jong AZ in professional football on 22 December 2017, in the home match against NEC. He was in the starting lineup, played the entire match and scored a goal, as Jong AZ lost 7–2.

==== Loans ====
Duin was sent on a one-season loan deal to FC Volendam on 2 September 2019. He made 14 appearances for the club, in which he scored five goals. On 31 July 2020, Duin was sent on another one-season loan, this time to MVV Maastricht. On 12 December, however, it was announced that Duin was returning to AZ on 1 January 2021 due to lacking perspectives of further development. On 19 August 2022 it was confirmed, that Duin had joined Danish Superliga club AGF on a one-year loan deal with a purchase option.

On 4 June 2023, in a sold-out home game against rivals Brøndby, Duin's remarkable performance turned the tide for AGF. Despite being down 3–0 and reduced to 10 men due to a red card to teammate Kevin Yakob in the 37th minute, AGF needed a draw to secure the bronze medals and entry into European competition. In the 71st minute, Duin came off the bench and three minutes later he scored a spectacular goal. He followed up with another shot on goal in the 80th minute, which Brøndby's Kevin Mensah blocked with his hand, resulting in a red card and a penalty, which Patrick Mortensen converted, bringing the score to 2–3. In the 85th minute, Duin scored once more, sealing AGF's bronze medal victory.

=== Hapoel Jerusalem ===
On 8 September 2023, Duin joined Israeli Premier League club Hapoel Jerusalem.

=== Vejle ===
On 23 January 2025, it was confirmed that Duin was back in Denmark when he joined Danish Superliga club Vejle Boldklub on a deal until June 2027.

== International career ==
Duin scoyed 2 goals in 10 games for the Netherlands national under-19 football team.

== Career statistics ==
As of match played 20 January 2025

Appearances and goals by club, season and competition
Club	Season	League			National cup (Note: Includes KNVB Cup, Danish Cup, Israel State Cup)		League cup (Note: Includes Toto Cup)		Europe		Other		Total	
Club	Season	Division	Apps	Goals	Apps	Goals	Apps	Goals	Apps	Goals	Apps	Goals	Apps	Goals
Jong AZ	2016–17	Tweede Divisie	3	0	—		—		—		—		3	0
Jong AZ	2017–18	Eerste Divisie	11	2	—		—		—		—		11	2
Jong AZ	2018–19	Eerste Divisie	29	3	—		—		—		—		29	3
Jong AZ	2019–20	Eerste Divisie	3	0	—		—		—		—		3	0
Jong AZ	2020–21	Eerste Divisie	14	7	—		—		—		—		14	7
Jong AZ	2021–22	Eerste Divisie	9	2	—		—		—		—		9	2
Jong AZ	Total		69	14	—		—		—		—		69	14
Volendam (loan)	2019–20	Eerste Divisie	14	5	1	0	—		—		—		15	5
MVV (loan)	2020–21	Eerste Divisie	8	2	0	0	—		—		—		8	2
AZ	2020–21	Eredivisie	4	0	—		—		—		—		4	0
AZ	2021–22	Eredivisie	1	0	0	0	—		2 (Note: Appearances in UEFA Europa Conference League)	0	0	0	3	0
AZ	Total		5	0	0	0	—		2	0	0	0	7	0
AGF (loan)	2022–23	Danish Superliga	15	3	3	1	—		—		—		18	4
Hapoel Jerusalem	2023–24	Israeli Premier League	25	6	2	0	0	0	—		—		27	6
Hapoel Jerusalem	2024–25	Israeli Premier League	12	1	1	0	3	0	—		—		16	1
Hapoel Jerusalem	Total		37	7	3	0	3	0	0	0	0	0	43	7
Vejle	2024–25	Danish Superliga	0	0	0	0	—		—		—		0	0
Career total			173	37	9	1	3	0	2	0	0	0	187	38

== Honours ==
Jong AZ

- Tweede Divisie: 2016–17
