= Anthony Swolfs =

Belgian footballer

Personal information
- Date of birth: 25 November 1997 (age 28)
- Place of birth: Malle, Belgium
- Height: 1.95 m (6 ft 5 in)
- Position: Goalkeeper

Youth career
- Koningshof
- Brasschaat
- Royal Antwerp
- Beerschot
- Club Brugge

Senior career*
Years	Team	Apps	(Gls)
2015–2018	Mechelen	0	(0)
2018–2019	Gent	0	(0)
2018–2019	→ Waasland-Beveren (loan)	2	(0)
2019–2020	Telstar	19	(0)
2020–2021	Dordrecht	20	(0)
Total		41	(0)
- * Club domestic league appearances and goals

Anthony Swolfs (born 25 November 1997) is a Belgian former professional footballer who played as a goalkeeper.

== Career ==
In February 2015, Swolfs signed with Mechelen, who had scouted him in the youth department of Club Brugge. There, he became fourth in the goalkeepers depth chart behind Jean-François Gillet, Colin Coosemans and Anthony Moris. He did not make an official appearance during his three years at Mechelen, but Swolfs impressed to such a degree with the reserve team that he secured a move to Gent, where he signed in January 2018. At Gent, he became third goalkeeper on the depth chart behind Lovre Kalinić and Yannick Thoelen.

To allow Swolf to gain playing experience, Gent loaned him out to Waasland-Beveren in the summer of 2018. There too, however, he became backup, this time to Davy Roef and Kevin Debaty. He only made his debut in the Belgian First Division A on 11 May 2019, when manager Adnan Čustović started him in the second play-off match against Cercle Brugge. Swolfs only allowed one goal and helped Waasland-Beveren to a 2–1 win. On the final matchday of the season, he also made a start, this time against Royal Excel Mouscron.

On 31 May 2019, Dutch Eerste Divisie club Telstar signed Swolf on a free transfer from Gent. He signed a one-year contract with the option of an extra year with the club. He immediately became the starting goalkeeper. One year later, Swolf moved to division rivals Dordrecht.

In January 2021, Swolfs abruptly announced his retirement from football after a match against Volendam to focus on a career in the financial sector.
