= Sven van der Maaten =

Dutch footballer (born 1994)

Personal information
- Date of birth: 23 March 1994 (age 32)
- Place of birth: Harderwijk, Netherlands
- Height: 1.83 m (6 ft 0 in)
- Position: Goalkeeper

Team information
- Current team: Scheveningen
- Number: 20

Youth career
- EFC '58
- DVS '33
- 2007–2013: Vitesse
- 2013–2015: NAC Breda

Senior career*
Years	Team	Apps	(Gls)
2015–2018	NAC Breda	0	(0)
2017–2018	→ Telstar (loan)	1	(0)
2018–2020	Telstar	15	(0)
2020–	Scheveningen	100	(0)
- * Club domestic league appearances and goals as of 15:15, 8 May 2024 (UTC)

Sven van der Maaten (born 23 March 1994) is a Dutch footballer who plays as a goalkeeper for Scheveningen.

== Career ==
Ahead of the 2018–19 season, he joined SC Telstar on a permanent move.

On 13 May 2020, van der Maaten joined SVV Scheveningen.
