= Rashaan Fernandes =

Dutch footballer (born 1998)

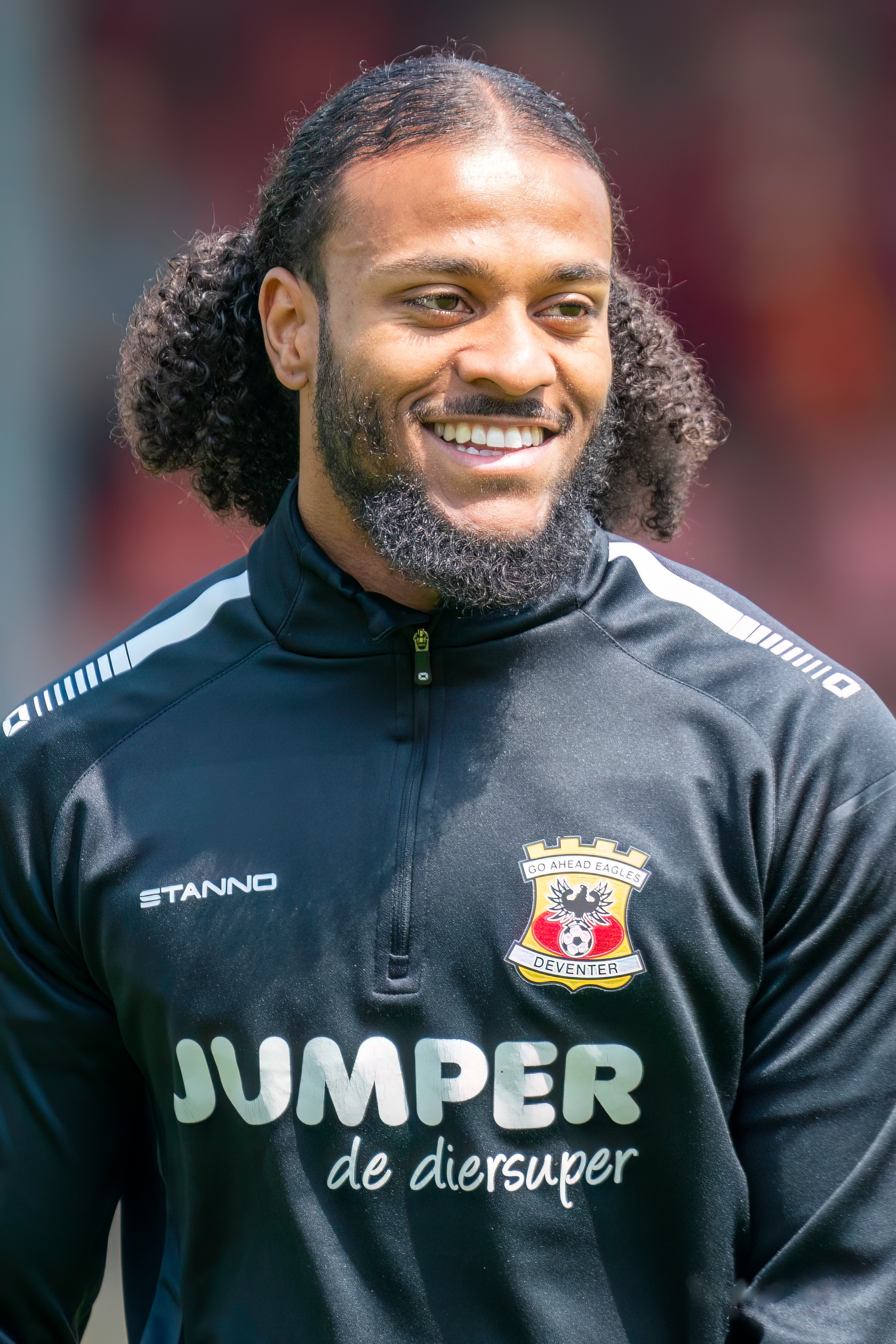
- Fernandes with Go Ahead Eagles in 2023

Personal information
- Date of birth: 29 July 1998 (age 28)
- Place of birth: Rotterdam, Netherlands
- Height: 1.70 m (5 ft 7 in)
- Position: Winger

Team information
- Current team: Omonia 29M
- Number: 7

Youth career
- –2011: Excelsior
- 2011–2017: Feyenoord
- 2017–2019: Twente

Senior career*
Years	Team	Apps	(Gls)
2018–2019	Twente	1	(0)
2019–2022	Telstar	77	(7)
2022–2024	Go Ahead Eagles	25	(0)
2024	→ União de Leiria (loan)	9	(1)
2024–	Omonia 29M	20	(3)

International career^{‡}
2013	Netherlands U15	4	(0)
2013–2014	Netherlands U16	9	(2)
2014–2015	Netherlands U17	15	(3)
2015	Netherlands U18	4	(1)
- * Club domestic league appearances and goals as of 6 September 2026 ‡ National team caps and goals as of 18 March 2021

Rashaan Fernandes (born 29 July 1998) is a Dutch professional footballer who plays as a winger for Cypriot club Omonia 29M.

== Club career ==
In July 2019, Fernandes went on trial with Go Ahead Eagles, but was not offered a contract. Fernandes did eventually get the chance to play for Go Ahead Eagles, as his contract came to an end at Telstar after the 2021–22 season and he signed a three-year contract with Go Ahead Eagles.

On 30 January 2024, Fernandes was loaned to Liga Portugal 2 club União de Leiria until the end of the 2023–24 season.

On 5 July 2024, Fernandes agreed to join PAC Omonia 29M in Cyprus.

== International career ==
Fernandes played 9 games (2 goals) for the Netherlands national under-16 football team.

== Personal life ==
Born in the Netherlands, Fernandes is of Surinamese descent.
