= Frank Korpershoek =

Dutch footballer (born 1984)

Personal information
- Date of birth: 29 October 1984 (age 42)
- Place of birth: Heemstede, Netherlands
- Height: 1.79 m (5 ft 10 in)
- Position: Midfielder

Team information
- Current team: Ajax (youth coach)

Youth career
- Koninklijke HFC

Senior career*
| Years | Team | Apps | (Gls) |
| 2003–2004 | Koninklijke HFC | | |
| 2004–2006 | DWV | | |
| 2006–2021 | Telstar | 368 | (14) |
- * Club domestic league appearances and goals

Frank Korpershoek (born 29 October 1984) is a Dutch former professional footballer who played as a midfielder. He holds the record for most appearances for Telstar. He is the coach of the Ajax under-14 team.

== Playing career ==
Korpershoek began his career at Koninklijke HFC and later played for DWV. In 2006, he joined Telstar, making his professional debut on 18 August 2006 in a match against Helmond Sport, coming on as an 86th-minute substitute for Raymond Fafiani under head coach Luc Nijholt. After several substitute appearances, he made his first start for the club on 8 September 2006 in a match against FC Omniworld, in which he also scored his first professional goal.

Over the years, Korpershoek became a key player for Telstar, earning the nickname "Mister Telstar" for his loyalty and longevity at the club. On 28 September 2020, Korpershoek equalled Fred Bischot's record of 373 appearances for Telstar in their 6–1 win over Den Bosch. Four days later, on 2 October 2020, he broke Bischot's appearance record for Telstar in the 3–0 away defeat to Jong PSV.

Korpershoek announced his retirement from professional football on 15 February 2021 after having played 15 years for Telstar.

== Coaching career ==
Korpershoek pursued career in coaching after retiring as a player, and was appointed assistant coach of Koninklijke HFC in June 2021. In July 2022, Korpershoek joined Ajax' under-16 team as coach. In June 2024, he moved to coach the under-14 team, bringing former Ajax player Lesly de Sa on board as his assistant.
