= Melle Springer =

Dutch footballer

Personal information
- Date of birth: 30 December 1998 (age 27)
- Place of birth: Haarlem, Netherlands
- Height: 1.87 m (6 ft 2 in)
- Position: Left back

Team information
- Current team: IJVV Stormvogels

Youth career
- VV IJmuiden
- 2009–2017: AZ

Senior career*
Years	Team	Apps	(Gls)
2017–2018	Jong AZ	18	(0)
2018–2020	Telstar	40	(3)
2020–	IJVV Stormvogels		
- * Club domestic league appearances and goals as of 12 November 2020

Melle Springer (born 30 December 1998) is a Dutch footballer who plays for IJVV Stormvogels in the Derde Klasse.

== Club career ==
He made his Eerste Divisie debut for Jong AZ on 1 September 2017 in a game against Jong Utrecht.

After two years with Eerste Divisie club Telstar, he moved to amateur club IJVV Stormvogels in June 2020, effectively retiring from professional football. Instead, Springer would focus on his studies.
