= Sven van Doorm =

Dutch footballer (born 1997)

Personal information
- Date of birth: 17 April 1997 (age 29)
- Place of birth: Epe, Netherlands
- Height: 1.72 m (5 ft 8 in)
- Position: Midfielder

Team information
- Current team: HHC Hardenberg
- Number: 7

Youth career
- 2003–2006: EZC '84
- 2006–2017: Vitesse

Senior career*
Years	Team	Apps	(Gls)
2014–2018	Jong Vitesse	28	(4)
2018–2019	Vitesse	0	(0)
2018–2019	→ Telstar (loan)	25	(1)
2019–2022	Telstar	84	(5)
2022–2024	Eindhoven	57	(2)
2024–	HHC Hardenberg	49	(2)

International career
2013	Netherlands U17	1	(0)
- * Club domestic league appearances and goals as of 23:06, 6 February 2026 (UTC)

Sven van Doorm (born 17 April 1997) is a Dutch professional footballer who plays as a midfielder for HHC Hardenberg.

== Club career ==
Born in Epe, Van Doorm joined Vitesse in 2006, following a spell with EZC '84. Ahead of the 2018–19 campaign, he joined Eerste Divisie side, Telstar on a season-long loan following a contract extension. On 24 August 2018, he went onto make his professional debut during Telstar's 1–0 home defeat to MVV, featuring for the entire 90 minutes.

On 22 June 2022, Van Doorm signed a two-year contract with FC Eindhoven, also competing in the Eerste Divisie.

== International career ==
Van Doorm once played for the Netherlands national under-17 football team.

== Career statistics ==
As of match played 6 May 2022

Club	Season	League			KNVB Cup		Europe		Other		Total	
Club	Season	Division	Apps	Goals	Apps	Goals	Apps	Goals	Apps	Goals	Apps	Goals
Jong Vitesse	2017–18	Derde Divisie	28	4	—		—		—		28	4
Telstar (loan)	2018–19	Eerste Divisie	25	1	1	0	—		—		26	1
Telstar	2019–20	Eerste Divisie	23	2	2	0	—		—		25	2
Telstar	2020–21	Eerste Divisie	24	1	1	0	—		—		25	1
Telstar	2021–22	Eerste Divisie	37	2	3	0	—		—		40	2
Telstar	Total		109	6	7	0	—		—		116	6
Eindhoven	2022–23	Eerste Divisie	0	0	0	0	—		0	0	0	0
Career total			137	10	7	0	0	0	0	0	144	10

== Honours ==
Jong Vitesse

- Derde Divisie – Sunday: 2017–18
