= Reda Kharchouch =

Dutch footballer (born 1995)

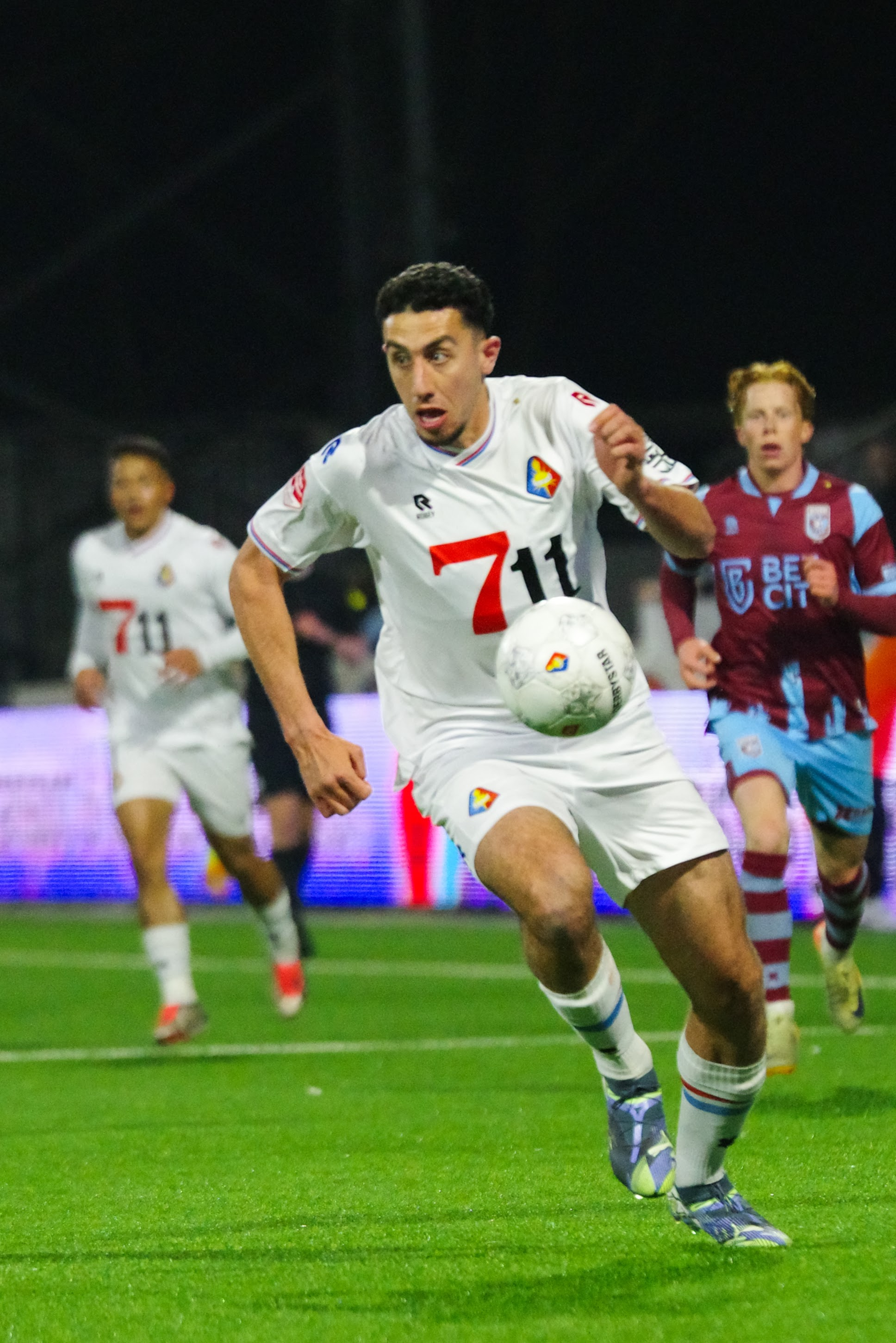
- Kharchouch with Telstar in 2025

Personal information
- Date of birth: 27 August 1995 (age 31)
- Place of birth: Amsterdam, Netherlands
- Height: 1.87 m (6 ft 2 in)
- Position: Forward

Team information
- Current team: PAC Omonia 29M
- Number: 99

Youth career
- SV Diemen

Senior career*
Years	Team	Apps	(Gls)
2013–2015	VVA/Spartaan		
2015–2017	Ajax Amateurs		
2017–2018	Quick Boys	17	(5)
2018–2019	OFC Oostzaan	20	(20)
2019–2020	Telstar	28	(20)
2020–2022	Sparta Rotterdam	19	(2)
2021–2022	→ Emmen (loan)	25	(7)
2022–2023	Excelsior	29	(2)
2023–2024	Al-Bukiryah	17	(7)
2024	Hajer	13	(0)
2024–2025	Telstar	24	(0)
2025–	PAC Omonia 29M	23	(5)
- * Club domestic league appearances and goals as of 3 May 2026

Reda Kharchouch (born 27 August 1995) is a Dutch professional footballer who plays as a forward for Cypriot Second Division club PAC Omonia 29M.

== Career ==
=== Telstar ===
In May 2019, Kharchouch got his first chance in professional football, signing a two-year deal with Telstar. He made his league debut for the club on 16 August 2019 in a 1–0 victory over Den Bosch.

=== Emmen ===
On 17 August 2021, he joined Emmen on loan with an option to buy.

=== Excelsior ===
On 12 July 2022, Kharchouch signed a three-year contract with Excelsior.

=== Saudi Arabia ===
On 31 July 2023, Kharchouch joined Saudi First Division League side Al-Bukiryah.

On 22 January 2024, Kharchouch joined Hajer.

=== Return to Telstar ===
On 26 August 2024, Kharchouch returned to Telstar.

=== PAC Omonia 29M ===
On 27 August 2025, Kharchouch joined PAC Omonia 29M of the Cypriot Second Division.

== Personal life ==
Born in the Netherlands, Kharchouch is of Moroccan descent.
