= 2017–18 SC Telstar season =

SC Telstar
2017–18 season
- Stadium: Sportpark Schoonenberg
- Eerste Divisie: 6th
- KNVB Cup: 1st round
- Top goalscorer: League: Andrija Novakovich (20 goals); All: Andrija Novakovich (21 goals)
- Highest home attendance: 4,663 (Promotion playoffs 2nd round 1st match)
- Lowest home attendance: 1,544 (2nd week)
- Average home league attendance: 2,597
- Biggest win: 4-0 (Almere City FC (h) 11th week)
- Biggest defeat: 6-0 (Jong PSV (a) 14th week)
- All statistics correct as of 13 May 2018.

The 2017–18 season marked the 55th season in the history of SC Telstar.

SC Telstar competed in the Eerste Divisie for the 41st time, with the campaign representing their 40th consecutive season in the second tier of Dutch football.

Alongside their league campaign, SC Telstar participated in the KNVB Cup. Their cup run ended in the first round following a 4–1 defeat to VVSB.

SC Telstar finished sixth in the Eerste Divisie and qualified for the promotion/relegation play-offs. They faced De Graafschap in the second round and won the home leg 3–2, but a 4–2 defeat in the return leg resulted in a 6–5 aggregate loss and eliminated SC Telstar from the play-offs.

Andrija Novakovich finished as SC Telstar's top scorer for the season with 21 goals in all competitions. He scored 18 goals in the Eerste Divisie, two in the promotion playoffs, and one in the KNVB Cup.

Elso Brito and Jerdy Schouten shared the record for the most appearances for SC Telstar that season, each playing 40 matches across all competitions. Both featured in 37 Eerste Divisie matches, two promotion playoff games, and one KNVB Cup match.

== Players ==
=== First-team squad ===
As of 31 January 2018

Note: Flags indicate national team as defined under FIFA eligibility rules; some limited exceptions apply. Players may hold more than one non-FIFA nationality.

No.	Pos.	Nation	Player
1	GK	NED	Sven van der Maaten
1	GK	NED	Rody de Boer
2	DF	NED	Rodny Lopes Cabral
3	DF	NED	Toine van Huizen
4	DF	NED	Donny van Iperen
5	DF	CPV	Elso Brito
6	DF	NED	Frank Korpershoek
7	FW	LUX	Gerson Rodrigues
7	FW	NED	Mohamed Hamdaoui
8	MF	NED	Edo Knol
8	MF	BEL	Senne Lynen
9	FW	USA	Andrija Novakovich
10	MF	NED	Jerdy Schouten

No.	Pos.	Nation	Player
11	MF	BRA	Júnior
13	DF	NED	Jasper van Heertum
13	DF	FRA	Joakim Balmy
14	MF	SYR	Mohammed Osman
15	DF	NED	Shaquill Sno
18	MF	NED	Anass Najah
18	FW	NED	Chisom Leonard Johnson
19	MF	SOM	Liban Abdulahi
19	MF	GHA	Shadrach Eghan
20	FW	NED	Melvin Platje
21	FW	NED	Oussama Zamouri
23	FW	NED	Floris van der Linden

== Transfers ==
=== In ===
Pos.	Player	Transferred from	Fee	Date
MF	(Netherlands) Anass Najah	(Netherlands) RKC Waalwijk U21	Free	1 July 2017
FW	(Netherlands) Chisom Leonard Johnson	No club		1 July 2017
DF	(Cape Verde) Elso Brito	(Netherlands) Excelsior Rotterdam	Free	1 July 2017
MF	(Netherlands) Jerdy Schouten	(Netherlands) ADO Den Haag	Free	1 July 2017
FW	(Netherlands) Mohamed Hamdaoui	No club		1 July 2017
DF	(Cape Verde) Rodny Lopes Cabral	(Netherlands) RVVH	Free	1 July 2017
GK	(Netherlands) Rody de Boer	(Netherlands) ADO Den Haag	Free	1 July 2017
DF	(Netherlands) Shaquill Sno	(Netherlands) Jong Almere	Free	1 July 2017
FW	(United States) Andrija Novakovich	(England) Reading F.C.	On loan	2 July 2017
DF	(Netherlands) Jasper van Heertum	(Belgium) Lommel SK	Free	4 July 2017
FW	(Brazil) Júnior	(Brazil) Linhares Futebol Clube		21 July 2017
FW	(Netherlands) Melvin Platje	(Belgium) Lommel SK	Free	12 August 2017
FW	(Luxembourg) Gerson Rodrigues	(Luxembourg) CS Fola Esch	€20,000	16 August 2017
FW	(Netherlands) Sven van der Maaten	(Netherlands) NAC Breda	On loan	31 August 2017
MF	(Syria) Mohammed Osman	No club		11 September 2017
MF	(Syria) Senne Lynen	(Belgium) Club Brugge U21	On loan	29 January 2018
DF	(France) Joakim Balmy	(France) OGC Nice B	Free	30 January 2018
DF	(Ghana) Shadrach Eghan	(Netherlands) Go Ahead Eagles	On loan	31 January 2018

=== Out ===
Pos.	Player	Transferred to	Fee	Date
MF	(Netherlands) Orhan Džepar	(Netherlands) Go Ahead Eagles	End of loan	30 June 2017
GK	(Netherlands) Çağrı Kodalak	(Netherlands) Rijnsburgse Boys	Free	1 July 2017
FW	(North Macedonia) Denis Mahmudov	(Netherlands) FC Dordrecht	Free	1 July 2017
FW	(Netherlands) Fabian Serrarens	(Netherlands) De Graafschap	Free	1 July 2017
FW	(Netherlands) Guyon Philips	(Netherlands) Achilles '29	Free	1 July 2017
FW	(Netherlands) Joël Donald	(Netherlands) Jong Groningen	Free	1 July 2017
DF	(Netherlands) Jordy Tutuarima	(Netherlands) De Graafschap	Free	1 July 2017
MF	(Morocco) Mohammed Ajnane	No club		1 July 2017
MF	(Japan) Naoyuki Yamazaki	No club		1 July 2017
DF	(Netherlands) Tom Beissel	(Netherlands) De Treffers	Free	1 July 2017
DF	(Netherlands) Crescendo van Berkel	(Norway) Sandefjord Fotball	Free	20 July 2017
FW	(Armenia) Norair Aslanyan	(Armenia) FC Alashkert	Free	24 July 2017
DF	(Netherlands) Thomas van den Houten	(Netherlands) Amsterdamsche FC	Free	9 August 2017
GK	(Netherlands) Bryan Ottenhoff	(Netherlands) OFC Oostzaan	Free	21 August 2017
GK	(Netherlands) Boy de Jong	(Belgium) RSC Anderlecht		24 August 2017
FW	(Netherlands) Calvin Valies	(Greece) Veria 1960 FC	Free	11 September 2017
FW	(Netherlands) Chisom Leonard Johnson	No club		1 January 2018
MF	(New Zealand) Benjamin van den Broek	(Netherlands) HFC Haarlem	Free	3 January 2018
FW	(Luxembourg) Gerson Rodrigues	(Moldova) FC Sheriff Tiraspol	€40,000	30 January 2018
MF	(Syria) Mohammed Osman	(Netherlands) Heracles Almelo		30 January 2018

== Competitions ==
=== Overall record ===
Competition	First match	Last match	Starting round	Final position	Record							
Competition	First match	Last match	Starting round	Final position	Pld	W	D	L	GF	GA	GD	Win %
Eredivisie	18 August 2017	28 April 2018	Week 1	6th	38	16	13	9	66	63	+3	42.11
Promotion/Relegation playoffs	10 May 2018	13 May 2018	2nd round	2nd round	2	1	0	1	5	6	−1	50.00
KNVB Cup	20 September 2017	20 September 2017	1st round	1st round	2	1	0	1	1	4	−3	50.00
Total					42	18	13	11	72	73	−1	42.86

Source: ESPN

=== Eerste Divisie ===
==== League table ====
Pos	Team	Pld	W	D	L	GF	GA	GD	Pts	Promotion, qualification or relegation
1	Jong Ajax (Note: Reserves teams aren't eligible to be promoted to the Eredivisie.) (C)	38	25	4	9	89	54	+35	79	
2	Fortuna Sittard (Note: Winner of the Second and Fourth Period (games 12-20 and 30-38).) (P)	38	24	6	8	81	41	+40	78	Promotion to the Eredivisie
3	NEC (Note: Winner of the First Period (games 3-11).)	38	22	8	8	82	46	+36	74	Qualification to promotion play-offs Second round
4	De Graafschap (O, P)	38	18	11	9	78	47	+31	65	Qualification to promotion play-offs Second round
5	Jong PSV	38	19	7	12	76	54	+22	64	
6	Telstar	38	16	13	9	66	63	+3	61	Qualification to promotion play-offs Second round
7	Emmen (O, P)	38	14	16	8	58	50	+8	58	Qualification to promotion play-offs Second round
8	Cambuur	38	16	10	12	58	53	+5	58	Qualification to promotion play-offs First round
9	Almere City	38	15	7	16	70	76	−6	52	Qualification to promotion play-offs First round
10	MVV	38	14	8	16	57	56	+1	50	Qualification to promotion play-offs First round
11	Den Bosch	38	12	11	15	59	55	+4	47	
12	Eindhoven	38	14	5	19	61	83	−22	47	
13	Dordrecht (Note: Winner of the Third Period (games 21-29).)	38	14	5	19	57	81	−24	47	Qualification to promotion play-offs First round
14	Volendam	38	13	7	18	59	67	−8	46	
15	Oss	38	12	10	16	53	65	−12	46	
16	Jong AZ	38	14	4	20	57	70	−13	46	
17	Go Ahead Eagles	38	9	10	19	48	68	−20	37	
18	RKC Waalwijk	38	8	13	17	37	61	−24	37	
19	Helmond Sport	38	9	9	20	50	67	−17	36	
20	Jong FC Utrecht (R)	38	7	6	25	37	76	−39	27	Relegation to the Tweede Divisie

Source: Soccerway, Jupiler League (in Dutch)
Rules for classification: Season in progress: 1) Most points won; 2) Less points lost; 3) Goal difference; 4) Goals scored; 5) Alphabetical order. End of season: 1) Points; 2) Goal difference; 3) Goals scored; 4) Head-to-head points; 5) Head-to-head goal difference; 6) Head-to-head away goals scored; 7) Play-off if relevant for deciding champion, relegation, international competitions and play-offs qualification, otherwise by draw. 8) Penalty shoot-out (only after a play-off)
(C) Champions; (O) Play-off winners; (P) Promoted; (R) Relegated

==== Results summary ====
Overall								Home						Away					
Pld	W	D	L	GF	GA	GD	Pts	W	D	L	GF	GA	GD	W	D	L	GF	GA	GD
38	16	13	9	66	63	+3	61	10	6	3	39	27	+12	6	7	6	27	36	−9

Last updated: 28 April 2018.
Source: https://www.espn.nl/voetbal/team/scorebord/_/id/3735/season/2017/

==== Results by round ====
Round	1	2	3	4	5	6	7	8	9	10	11	12	13	14	15	16	17	18	19	20	21	22	23	24	25	26	27	28	29	30	31	32	33	34	35	36	37	38
Ground	A	H	H	A	H	A	H	A	H	A	H	H	A	A	H	A	H	A	H	A	H	H	A	H	A	H	A	H	A	A	H	A	A	H	A	H	A	H
Result	D	D	D	D	W	D	L	W	W	W	W	W	L	L	W	L	D	W	W	D	W	W	L	D	D	W	W	L	W	D	D	D	L	D	W	W	L	L
Position																																						6

A = Away; H = Home; W = Win; D = Draw; L = Loss

=== Matches ===
==== 1st half ====
18 August 2017 1st week	FC Eindhoven	2–2	SC Telstar	Eindhoven
20:00	Elton Kabangu 64' 74'	Report	Junior Toretta 16'; Gerson Rodrigues 72'	Stadium: Jan Louwers Stadion; Attendance: 2,201

25 August 2017 2nd week	SC Telstar	0–0	MVV Maastricht	Velsen-Zuid
20:00		Report		Stadium: Sportpark Schoonenberg; Attendance: 1,544

1 September 2017 3rd week	SC Telstar	3–3	TOP Oss	Velsen-Zuid
20:00	Mohamed Hamdaoui 52' 60' 64'	Report	Richard van der Venne 6'; Istvan Bakx 39'; Fisayo Adarabioyo 81'	Stadium: Sportpark Schoonenberg; Attendance: 1,963

12 September 2017 4th week	Jong AZ	2–2	SC Telstar	Alkmaar
20:00	Teun Koopmeiners 8'; Fred Friday 69'	Report	Andrija Novakovich 31'; Donny van Iperen 90+3'	Stadium: AFAS Stadion; Attendance: 1,647

15 September 2017 5th week	SC Telstar	3–2	FC Den Bosch	Velsen-Zuid
20:00	Gerson Rodrigues 3'; Melvin Platje 26'; Andrija Novakovich 78' (pen.)	Report	Sven Blummel 7'; Dennis Kaars 62'	Stadium: Sportpark Schoonenberg; Attendance: 1,815

20 September 2017 6th week	Jong Ajax	1–1	SC Telstar	Duivendrecht, Amsterdam
20:00	Teun Bijleveld 83'	Report	Toine van Huizen 27'	Stadium: Sportpark De Toekomst; Attendance: 1,750

29 September 2017 7th week	SC Telstar	0–6	Fortuna Sittard	Velsen-Zuid
20:00		Report	Perr Schuurs 56'; André Vidigal 62' 82' 85'; Wessel Dammers 68'; Finn Stokkers 83'	Stadium: Sportpark Schoonenberg; Attendance: 1,982

6 October 2017 8th week	FC Volendam	3–4	SC Telstar	Volendam
20:00	Joey Veerman 4' 58' (pen.); Enzo Stroo 81'	Report	Mohamed Hamdaoui 11'; Andrija Novakovich 45+1' (pen.) 47'; Frank Korpershoek 70'	Stadium: Kras Stadion; Attendance: 3,189

13 October 2017 9th week	SC Telstar	3–0	FC Dordrecht	Velsen-Zuid
20:00	Andrija Novakovich 41' (pen.); Mohammed Osman 59'; Toine van Huizen 73'	Report		Stadium: Sportpark Schoonenberg; Attendance: 2,249

20 October 2017 10th week	Helmond Sport	1–2	SC Telstar	Helmond
20:00	Arne Naudts 24'	Report	Andrija Novakovich 5'; Mohamed Hamdaoui 45+1'	Stadium: Stadion De Braak; Attendance: 1,579

29 October 2017 11th week	SC Telstar	4–0	Almere City FC	Velsen-Zuid
14:30	Melvin Platje 12' 65'; Andrija Novakovich 33'; Mohammed Osman 86' (pen.)	Report		Stadium: Sportpark Schoonenberg; Attendance: 2,549

3 November 2017 12th week	SC Telstar	3–1	Go Ahead Eagles	Velsen-Zuid
20:00	Jerdy Schouten 9'; Mohammed Osman 26' 73'	Report	Sam Hendriks 70'	Stadium: Sportpark Schoonenberg; Attendance: 2,756

17 November 2017 13th week	RKC Waalwijk	4–1	SC Telstar	Waalwijk
20:00	Saïd Bakari 1'; Hans Mulder 25'; Rody de Boer 60' (o.g.); Serginho Greene 70'	Report	Gerson Rodrigues 68'	Stadium: Mandemakers Stadion; Attendance: 1,576

24 November 2017 14th week	Jong PSV	6–0	SC Telstar	Eindhoven
20:00	Albert Gudmundsson 13'; Matthias Verreth 16'; Donyell Malen 29' (pen.) 41'; Dante Rigo 50'; ANikolai Laursen 71'	Report		Stadium: De Herdgang; Attendance: 506

27 November 2017 15th week	SC Telstar	3–2	NEC Nijmegen	Velsen-Zuid
20:00	Toine van Huizen 59'; Mohammed Osman 68'; Melvin Platje 83'	Report	Anass Achahbar 72' (pen.); Sven Braken 78'	Stadium: Sportpark Schoonenberg; Attendance: 2,563

1 December 2017 16th week	SC Cambuur	2–1	SC Telstar	Leeuwarden
20:00	Furdjel Narsingh 77'; Ricardo Kip 83' (pen.)	Report	Mohamed Hamdaoui 48'	Stadium: Cambuur Stadion; Attendance: 6,769

8 December 2017 17th week	SC Telstar	2–2	FC Emmen	Velsen-Zuid
20:00		Report		Stadium: Sportpark Schoonenberg; Attendance: 2,142

15 December 2017 18th week	Jong FC Utrecht	0–1	SC Telstar	Bunschoten
20:00		Report	Melvin Platje 73'	Stadium: Sportpark De Westmaat; Attendance: 431

22 December 2017 19th week	SC Telstar	3–2	Helmond Sport	Velsen-Zuid
20:00	Andrija Novakovich 17' 64'; Melvin Platje 87'	Report	Anthony van den Hurk 11'; Fabian Serrarens 85'	Stadium: Sportpark Schoonenberg; Attendance: 2,736

==== 2nd half ====
12 January 2018 20th week	MVV Maastricht	0–0	SC Telstar	Maastricht
20:00		Report		Stadium: De Geusselt; Attendance: 4,419

19 January 2018 21st week	SC Telstar	4–1	FC Eindhoven	Velsen-Zuid
20:00	Andrija Novakovich 5' 44'; Melvin Platje 32'; Mohammed Osman 50'	Report	Mart Lieder 12'	Stadium: Sportpark Schoonenberg; Attendance: 2,489

26 January 2018 22nd week	SC Telstar	2–1	Jong AZ	Velsen-Zuid
20:00	Mohammed Osman 55'; Melvin Platje 69'	Report	Ferdy Druijf 34'	Stadium: Sportpark Schoonenberg; Attendance: 2,838

2 February 2018 23rd week	FC Den Bosch	3–2	SC Telstar	's-Hertogenbosch
20:00	Niek Vossebelt 14'; Jordy van der Winden 40'; Dennis Kaars 63'	Report	Melvin Platje 11' (pen.); Jerdy Schouten 51'	Stadium: De Vliert; Attendance: 2,565

9 February 2018 24th week	SC Telstar	3–3	Jong Ajax	Velsen-Zuid
20:00	Mohamed Hamdaoui 25'; Andrija Novakovich 56'; Jerdy Schouten 88'	Report	Mateo Cassierra 58'; Zian Flemming 65'; Luis Orejuela 73'	Stadium: Sportpark Schoonenberg; Attendance: 3,223

16 February 2018 25th week	Fortuna Sittard	1–1	SC Telstar	Utrecht
20:00	Lisandro Semedo 57' (pen.)	Report	Mohamed Hamdaoui 6'	Stadium: Fortuna Sittard Stadion; Attendance: 3,019

23 February 2018 26th week	SC Telstar	5–2	FC Volendam	Velsen-Zuid
20:00	Mohamed Hamdaoui 23' 27'; Shaquill Sno 29'; Melvin Platje 34'; Andrija Novakovich 38'	Report	Enzo Stroo 55'; Gijs Smal 72'	Stadium: Sportpark Schoonenberg; Attendance: 2,850

2 March 2018 27th week	FC Dordrecht	2–3	SC Telstar	Dordrecht
20:00	Daniël Breedijk 3'; Robert Mutzers 85'	Report	Andrija Novakovich 23' 50'; Mohamed Hamdaoui 68'	Stadium: Stadion Krommedijk; Attendance: 1,048

9 March 2018 28th week	SC Telstar	2–3	Helmond Sport	Velsen-Zuid
20:00	Melvin Platje 23' 75'	Report	Jordy Thomassen 48' 59'; Ron Janzen 80'	Stadium: Sportpark Schoonenberg; Attendance: 2,874

12 March 2018 29th week	Almere City FC	2–3	SC Telstar	Almere
20:00	Josef Kvida 71'; Silvester van der Water 76'	Report	Damon Mirani 7' (o.g.); Andrija Novakovich 50' 57'	Stadium: Yanmar Stadion; Attendance: 1,250

16 March 2018 30th week	Go Ahead Eagles	1–1	SC Telstar	Deventer
20:00	Givan Werkhoven 18'	Report	Andrija Novakovich 49'	Stadium: De Adelaarshorst; Attendance: 6,788

24 march 2018 31st week	SC Telstar	0–0	RKC Waalwijk	Velsen-Zuid
19:45		Report		Stadium: Sportpark Schoonenberg; Attendance: 2,663

30 March 2018 32nd week	TOP Oss	0–0	SC Telstar	Oss
20:00		Report		Stadium: Frans Heesen Stadion; Attendance: 2,921

2 April 2018 33rd week	NEC Nijmegen	3–0	SC Telstar	Nijmegen
14:30	Michael Heinloth 2'; Wojciech Golla 45+2'; Ferdi Kadıoğlu 81'	Report		Stadium: Goffertstadion; Attendance: 10,538

6 April 2018 34th week	SC Telstar	0–0	Jong PSV	Velsen-Zuid
20:00		Report		Stadium: Sportpark Schoonenberg; Attendance: 2,863

9 April 2018 35th week	FC Emmen	2–3	SC Telstar	Emmen
20:00	Cas Peters 29' (pen.); Thijs Dallinga 76'	Report	Melvin Platje 8' (pen.); Jerdy Schouten 33'; Andrija Novakovich 41'	Stadium: De Oude Meerdijk; Attendance: 2,359

13 April 2018 36th week	SC Telstar	1–0	Jong FC Utrecht	Velsen-Zuid
20:00	Melvin Platje 43' (pen.)	Report		Stadium: Sportpark Schoonenberg; Attendance: 2,514

20 April 2018 37th week	De Graafschap	1–0	SC Telstar	Doetinchem
20:00	Youssef El Jebli 76'	Report		Stadium: De Vijverberg; Attendance: 8,822

28 April 2018 38th week	SC Telstar	0–1	SC Cambuur	Velsen-Zuid
19:45		Report	Justin Mathieu 31' (pen.)	Stadium: Sportpark Schoonenberg; Attendance: 2,663

==== Promotion/Relegation Play-offs ====
10 May 2018 2nd round 1st match	SC Telstar	3-2	De Graafschap	Velsen-Zuid
12:30	Melvin Platje 20'; Andrija Novakovich 56'; Mohamed Hamdaoui 77'	Report	Daryl van Mieghem 72'; Fabian Serrarens 74'	Stadium: Sportpark Schoonenberg; Attendance: 4,663

13 May 2018 2nd round 2nd match	De Graafschap	4-2	SC Telstar	Doetinchem
12:30	Lars Nieuwpoort 4'; Youssef El Jebli 25'; Fabian Serrarens 66'; Daryl van Mieghem 80'	Report	Mohamed Hamdaoui 57'; Andrija Novakovich 75' (pen.)	Stadium: De Vijverberg; Attendance: 11,083

De Graafschap won 6–5 on aggregate.

=== KNVB Cup ===
20 September 2017 1st round	VVSB	4–1	SC Telstar	Noordwijkerhout
19:45	Mohamed El Osrouti 37' 53' 90+3' (pen.); Tim de Rijk 79'	Report	Andrija Novakovich 7' (pen.)	Stadium: Sportpark De Boekhorst; Attendance: 1,250

== Statistics ==
=== Scorers ===
#	Player	Eerste Divisie	Promotion playoffs	KNVB	Total
1	(United States) Andrija Novakovich	18	2	1	21
2	(Netherlands) Melvin Platje	14	1	0	15
3	(Netherlands) Mohamed Hamdaoui	11	2	0	13
4	(Syria) Mohammed Osman	6	0	0	6
5	(Netherlands) Jerdy Schouten	4	0	0	4
6	(Luxembourg) Gerson Rodrigues	3	0	0	3
6	(Netherlands) Toine van Huizen	3	0	0	3
8	(Netherlands) Donny van Iperen	1	0	0	1
8	(Netherlands) Frank Korpershoek	1	0	0	1
8	(Brazil) Júnior	1	0	0	1
8	(Netherlands) Shaquill Sno	1	0	0	1

=== Appearances ===
#	Player	Eerste Divisie	Promotion playoffs	KNVB	Total
1	(Cape Verde) Elso Brito	37	2	1	40
1	(Netherlands) Jerdy Schouten	37	2	1	40
3	(Netherlands) Rody de Boer	37	2	0	39
4	(United States) Andrija Novakovich	35	2	1	38
4	(Netherlands) Melvin Platje	35	2	1	38
6	(Netherlands) Frank Korpershoek	35	2	0	37
6	(Netherlands) Mohamed Hamdaoui	35	2	0	37
6	(Netherlands) Donny van Iperen	34	2	1	37
9	(Netherlands) Jasper van Heertum	33	2	1	36
9	(Netherlands) Shaquill Sno	33	2	1	36
9	(Netherlands) Toine van Huizen	34	1	1	36
12	(Netherlands) Rodny Lopes Cabral	32	1	0	33
13	(Netherlands) Anass Najah	28	1	0	29
14	(Syria) Mohammed Osman	19	0	1	20
15	(Luxembourg) Gerson Rodrigues	12	0	1	13
15	(Brazil) Júnior	12	1	0	13
17	(Netherlands) Oussama Zamouri	10	1	1	12
18	(Belgium) Senne Lynen	9	2	0	11
19	(Netherlands) Floris van der Linden	5	0	1	6
20	(Netherlands) Edo Knol	4	0	1	5
21	(Netherlands) Chisom Leonard Johnson	2	0	0	2
21	(Netherlands) Sven van der Maaten	1	0	1	2
23	(France) Joakim Balmy	1	0	0	1
23	(Somalia) Liban Abdulahi	1	0	0	1
23	(Ghana) Shadrach Eghan	1	0	0	1

=== Clean sheets ===
#	Player	Eerste Divisie
1	(Netherlands) Rody de Boer	10

=== Disciplinary record ===
#	Player	Eerste Divisie		Promotion playoffs		KNVB		Total	
#	Player	Yellow card	Red card	Yellow card	Red card	Yellow card	Red card	Yellow card	Red card
1	(Netherlands) Toine van Huizen	9	0	0	1	1	0	10	1
2	(Netherlands) Rodny Lopes Cabral	5	1	1	0	0	0	6	1
3	(Netherlands) Shaquill Sno	4	1	0	0	0	0	4	1
4	(Luxembourg) Gerson Rodrigues	0	1	0	0	0	0	0	1
5	(Netherlands) Frank Korpershoek	5	0	2	0	0	0	7	0
6	(United States) Andrija Novakovich	6	0	0	0	0	0	6	0
7	(Cape Verde) Elso Brito	5	0	0	0	0	0	5	0
8	(Netherlands) Donny van Iperen	4	0	0	0	0	0	4	0
8	(Netherlands) Jasper van Heertum	4	0	0	0	0	0	4	0
8	(Netherlands) Mohamed Hamdaoui	3	0	1	0	0	0	4	0
8	(Belgium) Senne Lynen	3	0	1	0	0	0	4	0
12	(Netherlands) Jerdy Schouten	3	0	0	0	0	0	3	0
12	(Netherlands) Melvin Platje	3	0	0	0	0	0	3	0
12	(Syria) Mohammed Osman	3	0	0	0	0	0	3	0
15	(Netherlands) Anass Najah	2	0	0	0	0	0	2	0
15	(Netherlands) Edo Knol	2	0	0	0	0	0	2	0
15	(Brazil) Júnior	2	0	0	0	0	0	2	0
18	(Netherlands) Rody de Boer	1	0	0	0	0	0	1	0
18	(Netherlands) Oussama Zamouri	0	0	1	0	0	0	1	0
