= 2016–17 SC Telstar season =

SC Telstar
2016–17 season
- Stadium: Sportpark Schoonenberg
- Eerste Divisie: 16th
- KNVB Cup: 2nd round
- Top goalscorer: League: Fabian Serrarens (8 goals); All: Fabian Serrarens (8 goals)
- Highest home attendance: 2,963 (33rd week)
- Lowest home attendance: 1,001 (20th week)
- Average home league attendance: 1,835
- Biggest win: 4-2 (Helmond Sport (h) 4th week); 2-0 (TOP Oss (a) 5th week NAC Breda (h) 10th week FC Den Bosch (h) 27th week FC Dordrecht (a) 35th week); 3-1 (TOP Oss (h) 23rd week Jong FC Utrecht (h) 36th week)
- Biggest defeat: 4-0 RKC Waalwijk (h) 20th week 5-1 SC Cambuur (a) 34th week
- All statistics correct as of 5 May 2017.

The 2016–17 season was the 54th season of SC Telstar since the club's formation.

The club took part in the Eerste Divisie for the 40th time, marking their 39th consecutive season in the second level of Dutch football.

In addition to their league commitments, SC Telstar entered the KNVB Cup, where their campaign ended in the second round after a 2–1 loss to ADO Den Haag.

SC Telstar finished the Eerste Divisie campaign in 16th position.

Fabian Serrarens was the club's leading league scorer, recording 8 goals during the season.

Jordy Tutuarima made the most appearances for SC Telstar across all competitions, featuring 37 times.

== Players ==
=== First-team squad ===
As of 5 May 2017

Note: Flags indicate national team as defined under FIFA eligibility rules; some limited exceptions apply. Players may hold more than one non-FIFA nationality.

No.	Pos.	Nation	Player
1	GK	NED	Wesley Zonneveld
2	DF	NED	Tom Beissel
3	DF	NED	Toine van Huizen
4	DF	NED	Bryan Ottenhoff
5	DF	NED	Thomas van den Houten
6	DF	NED	Frank Korpershoek
6	FW	NED	Guyon Philips
7	FW	NED	Fabian Serrarens
8	MF	TUR	Çağrı Kodalak
10	FW	NED	Mohammed Ajnane
11	FW	MKD	Denis Mahmudov
12	DF	NED	Donny van Iperen
13	MF	NZL	Benjamin van den Broek

No.	Pos.	Nation	Player
14	MF	SOM	Liban Abdulahi
15	DF	NED	Jordy Tutuarima
17	MF	NED	Orhan Džepar
18	MF	NED	Edo Knol
19	FW	NED	Floris van der Linden
20	GK	NED	Boy de Jong
21	MF	JPN	Naoyuki Yamazaki
23	DF	NED	Crescendo van Berkel
24	MF	NED	Calvin Valies
25	FW	NED	Oussama Zamouri
26	FW	IDN	Stefano Lilipaly
27	FW	NED	Joël Donald
28	FW	ARM	Norair Aslanyan

== Transfers ==
=== Out ===
Pos.	Player	Transferred to	Fee	Date
FW	(Indonesia) Stefano Lilipaly	(Netherlands) SC Cambuur		24 January 2017

== Competitions ==
=== Overall record ===
Competition	First match	Last match	Starting round	Final position	Record							
Competition	First match	Last match	Starting round	Final position	Pld	W	D	L	GF	GA	GD	Win %
Eredivisie	8 August 2016	5 May 2017	Week 1	16th	38	10	10	18	46	64	−18	26.32
KNVB Cup	20 September 2016	25 October 2016	1st round	2nd round	2	1	0	1	4	3	+1	50.00
Total					40	11	10	19	50	67	−17	27.50

Source: ESPN

=== Eerste Divisie ===
==== League table ====
Pos	Team	Pld	W	D	L	GF	GA	GD	Pts	Promotion, qualification or relegation
1	VVV-Venlo (C, P)	38	25	5	8	75	35	+40	80	Promotion to the Eredivisie
2	Jong Ajax (Note: Reserves teams cannot be promoted and cannot participate in the promotion play-offs.)	38	23	7	8	93	54	+39	76	
3	Cambuur	38	22	5	11	78	42	+36	71	Qualification to promotion play-offs Second round (Note: Ten teams, two from the Eredivisie and eight from the Eerste Divisie, play for two spots in the 2017–18 Eredivisie, the remaining eight teams play in the 2017–18 Eerste Divisie. The season is subdivided in periods consisting of games 1–9, 10–18, 19–27 and 28–36. The top finisher in each period (that has not won a previous period) is a period winner and qualifies for the promotion play-offs first round even if they finish the season outside of the top nine.)
4	Jong PSV	38	20	9	9	66	35	+31	69	
5	NAC Breda (O, P)	38	19	7	12	65	50	+15	64	Qualification to promotion play-offs Second round
6	Volendam	38	17	11	10	63	44	+19	62	Qualification to promotion play-offs Second round
7	MVV	38	15	14	9	55	45	+10	59	Qualification to promotion play-offs Second round
8	Almere City	38	17	8	13	74	66	+8	59	Qualification to promotion play-offs First round
9	Emmen	38	14	13	11	50	40	+10	55	Qualification to promotion play-offs First round
10	RKC Waalwijk	38	15	9	14	62	70	−8	54	Qualification to promotion play-offs First round
11	Eindhoven	38	15	8	15	64	71	−7	53	
12	De Graafschap	38	15	5	18	70	63	+7	50	
13	Helmond Sport	38	14	7	17	51	67	−16	49	Qualification to promotion play-offs First round
14	Den Bosch	38	12	9	17	48	67	−19	45	
15	Oss	38	12	5	21	67	95	−28	41	
16	Telstar	38	10	10	18	46	64	−18	40	
17	Fortuna Sittard (Note: Fortuna Sittard were deducted three points for an outstanding bill owed to KNVB. On 10 April 2017 Fortuna Sittard were deducted another 6 points for not meeting financial targets.)	38	13	9	16	54	67	−13	39	
18	Jong FC Utrecht	38	10	7	21	50	71	−21	37	
19	Dordrecht	38	5	9	24	42	72	−30	24	
20	Achilles '29 (Note: Achilles '29 were deducted three points for repeatedly not meeting financial requirements.) (R)	38	5	7	26	37	92	−55	19	Relegation to the Tweede Divisie

Source: NUsport (in Dutch), Soccerway
Rules for classification: 1) points; 2) goal difference; 3) number of goals scored
(C) Champions; (O) Play-off winners; (P) Promoted; (R) Relegated

==== Results summary ====
Overall								Home						Away					
Pld	W	D	L	GF	GA	GD	Pts	W	D	L	GF	GA	GD	W	D	L	GF	GA	GD
38	10	10	18	46	64	−18	40	4	4	11	19	31	−12	6	6	7	27	33	−6

Last updated: 5 May 2017.
Source: https://www.espn.nl/voetbal/team/scorebord/_/id/3735/season/2016/

==== Results by round ====
Round	1	2	3	4	5	6	7	8	9	10	11	12	13	14	15	16	17	18	19	20	21	22	23	24	25	26	27	28	29	30	31	32	33	34	35	36	37	38
Ground	A	H	A	H	A	H	A	H	A	H	A	H	A	H	A	H	A	H	A	H	A	H	H	A	H	A	H	A	A	H	H	A	H	A	A	H	A	H
Result	L	D	L	W	W	W	W	L	D	W	D	D	L	L	L	L	D	D	L	L	D	L	W	W	D	L	W	L	L	D	D	L	D	L	W	W	L	L
Position																																						16

A = Away; H = Home; W = Win; D = Draw; L = Loss

=== Matches ===
==== 1st half ====
8 August 2016 1st week	RKC Waalwijk	1–0	SC Telstar	Waalwijk
20:00	Kenny Anderson 58'	Report		Stadium: Mandemakers Stadion; Attendance: 2,100

12 August 2016 2nd week	SC Telstar	1–1	Fortuna Sittard	Velsen-Zuid
20:00	Donny van Iperen 90+3'	Report	Djibril Dianessy 90'	Stadium: Sportpark Schoonenberg; Attendance: 1,763

19 August 2016 3rd week	FC Volendam	3–0	SC Telstar	Volendam
20:00	Rihairo Meulens 3'; Jack Tuyp 15'; Gyliano van Velzen 37'	Report		Stadium: Kras Stadion; Attendance: 2,718

22 August 2016 4th week	SC Telstar	4–2	Helmond Sport	Velsen-Zuid
20:00	Crescendo van Berkel 25'; Oussama Zamouri 37'; Fabian Serrarens 45'; Mohammed Ajnane 87'	Report	Jordy Thomassen 55' (pen.) 68' (pen.)	Stadium: Sportpark Schoonenberg; Attendance: 1,299

26 August 2016 5th week	TOP Oss	0–2	SC Telstar	Oss
20:00		Report	Mohammed Ajnane 3' (pen.); Liban Abdulahi 86'	Stadium: Frans Heesen Stadion; Attendance: 1,989

9 September 2016 6th week	SC Telstar	2–1	Helmond Sport	Velsen-Zuid
20:00	Oussama Zamouri 69'; Stefano Lilipaly 79'	Report	Piotr Parzyszek 34'	Stadium: Sportpark Schoonenberg; Attendance: 2,363

16 September 2016 7th week	Achilles '29	1–2	SC Telstar	Groesbeek
20:00	Niek Versteegen 73'	Report	Stefano Lilipaly 30'; Guyon Philips 55'	Stadium: Sportpark De Heikant; Attendance: 1,432

23 September 2016 8th week	SC Telstar	1–4	FC Eindhoven	Velsen-Zuid
20:00	Orhan Džepar 27'	Report	Alemão 5' 35'; Mart Lieder 60' 69'	Stadium: Sportpark Schoonenberg; Attendance: 1,963

30 September 2016 9th week	FC Den Bosch	0–0	SC Telstar	's-Hertogenbosch
20:00		Report		Stadium: De Vliert; Attendance: 2,296

14 October 2016 10th week	SC Telstar	2–0	NAC Breda	Velsen-Zuid
20:00	Stefano Lilipaly 37'; Liban Abdulahi 85'	Report		Stadium: Sportpark Schoonenberg; Attendance: 2,601

21 October 2016 11th week	FC Emmen	0–0	SC Telstar	Emmen
20:00		Report		Stadium: De Oude Meerdijk; Attendance: 3,212

28 October 2016 12th week	SC Telstar	0–0	Jong PSV	Velsen-Zuid
20:00		Report		Stadium: Sportpark Schoonenberg; Attendance: 2,323

4 November 2016 13th week	MVV Maastricht	2–1	SC Telstar	Maastricht
20:00	Thomas Verheydt 37'; Dyon Gijzen 89'	Report	Denis Mahmudov 60'	Stadium: De Geusselt; Attendance: 4,380

18 November 2016 14th week	SC Telstar	3–6	Almere City FC	Velsen-Zuid
20:00	Liban Abdulahi 58'; Joël Donald 67'; Denis Mahmudov 69'	Report	Sherjill Mac-Donald 1' 81'; Soufyan Ahannach 44' 77' 90+5'; Silvester van der Water 86'	Stadium: Sportpark Schoonenberg; Attendance: 1,903

25 November 2016 15th week	Jong Ajax	2–1	SC Telstar	Duivendrecht, Amsterdam
20:00	Anwar El Ghazi 41'; Frenkie de Jong 45+1'	Report	Denis Mahmudov 51'	Stadium: De Toekomst; Attendance: 683

28 November 2016 16th week	SC Telstar	0–3	SC Cambuur	Velsen-Zuid
20:00		Report	Jamiro Monteiro 38'; Martijn Barto 57'; Sander van de Streek 89'	Stadium: Sportpark Schoonenberg; Attendance: 1,563

2 December 2016 17th week	VVV-Venlo	1–1	SC Telstar	Venlo
20:00	Johnatan Opoku 45+1'	Report	Crescendo van Berkel 83'	Stadium: De Koel; Attendance: 4,621

9 December 2016 18th week	SC Telstar	0–0	FC Dordrecht	Velsen-Zuid
20:00		Report		Stadium: Sportpark Schoonenberg; Attendance: 1,701

19 December 2016 19th week	Jong FC Utrecht	2–1	SC Telstar	Utrecht
20:00	Gyrano Kerk 6'; Sylla Sow 17'	Report	Oussama Zamouri 71'	Stadium: Stadion Galgenwaard; Attendance: 915

==== 2nd half ====
13 January 2017 20th week	SC Telstar	0–4	RKC Waalwijk	Velsen-Zuid
20:00		Report	Johan Voskamp 25' 71'; Moussa Sanoh 29'; Vlatko Lazic 79' (pen.)	Stadium: Sportpark Schoonenberg; Attendance: 1,001

20 January 2017 21st week	Fortuna Sittard	1–1	SC Telstar	Utrecht
20:00	Ferry de Regt 90+1'	Report	Toine van Huizen 32'	Stadium: Fortuna Sittard Stadion; Attendance: 1,444

27 January 2017 22nd week	SC Telstar	0–1	FC Volendam	Velsen-Zuid
20:00		Report	Joey Veerman 26'	Stadium: Sportpark Schoonenberg; Attendance: 2,275

3 February 2017 23rd week	SC Telstar	3–1	TOP Oss	Velsen-Zuid
20:00	Mohammed Ajnane 65' (pen.) 79'; Floris van der Linden 81'	Report	Cihat Çelik 13'	Stadium: Sportpark Schoonenberg; Attendance: 1,850

6 February 2017 24th week	Helmond Sport	3–4	SC Telstar	Helmond
20:00	Jordy Thomassen 18' 75'; Furhgill Zeldenrust 41'	Report	Benjamin van den Broek 17' 53'; Fabian Serrarens 47' 72'	Stadium: Stadion De Braak; Attendance: 1,286

10 February 2017 25th week	SC Telstar	1–1	Achilles '29	Velsen-Zuid
20:00	Mohammed Ajnane 64' (pen.)	Report	Antonio Stankov 18'	Stadium: Sportpark Schoonenberg; Attendance: 1,499

17 February 2017 26th week	De Graafschap	2–1	SC Telstar	Doetinchem
20:00	Piotr Parzyszek 71' (pen.) 81'	Report	Crescendo van Berkel 40'	Stadium: De Vijverberg; Attendance: 8,714

24 February 2017 27th week	SC Telstar	2–0	FC Den Bosch	Velsen-Zuid
20:00	Liban Abdulahi 30'; Fabian Serrarens 86'	Report		Stadium: Sportpark Schoonenberg; Attendance: 2,222

3 March 2017 28th week	FC Eindhoven	4–2	SC Telstar	Eindhoven
20:00	Civard Sprockel 30'; Rai Vloet 43'; Dario Van den Buijs 50' (pen.) 80' (pen.)	Report	Orhan Džepar 4'; Fabian Serrarens 58'	Stadium: Jan Louwers Stadion; Attendance: 2,430

10 March 2017 29th week	NAC Breda	1–0	SC Telstar	Breda
20:00	Cyriel Dessers 67'	Report		Stadium: Rat Verlegh Stadion; Attendance: 12,283

13 March 2017 30th week	SC Telstar	2–2	FC Emmen	Velsen-Zuid
20:00	Naoyuki Yamazaki 21'; Denis Mahmudov 56'	Report	Youri Loen 83'; Issa Kallon 90+1'	Stadium: Sportpark Schoonenberg; Attendance: 1,263

17 March 2017 31st week	SC Telstar	1–1	MVV Maastricht	Velsen-Zuid
20:00	Jordy Tutuarima 90+1'	Report	Luis Pedrosa 52'	Stadium: Sportpark Schoonenberg; Attendance: 1,200

31 March 2017 32nd week	Almere City FC	2–0	SC Telstar	Almere
20:00	Lars Nieuwpoort 35'; Soufyan Ahannach 59'	Report		Stadium: Yanmar Stadion; Attendance: 2,150

7 April 2017 33rd week	SC Telstar	1–3	Jong Ajax	Velsen-Zuid
20:00	Guyon Philips 90+1'	Report	Václav Cerný 52' 53' 63'	Stadium: Sportpark Schoonenberg; Attendance: 2,963

14 April 2017 34th week	SC Cambuur	5–1	SC Telstar	Leeuwarden
20:00	Sander van de Streek 8'; Tarik Tissoudali 44'; Erik Bakker 53' (pen.); Xander Houtkoop 80'; Martijn Barto 90+2'	Report	Naoyuki Yamazaki 89'	Stadium: Cambuur Stadion; Attendance: 7,610

17 April 2017 35th week	FC Dordrecht	0–2	SC Telstar	Dordrecht
20:00		Report	Guyon Philips 49'; Fabian Serrarens 61'	Stadium: Stadion Krommedijk; Attendance: 1,226

21 April 2017 36th week	SC Telstar	3–1	Jong FC Utrecht	Velsen-Zuid
20:00	Guyon Philips 12'; Fabian Serrarens 42' (pen.); Naoyuki Yamazaki 66'	Report	Sylla Sow 52'	Stadium: Sportpark Schoonenberg; Attendance: 1,444

28 April 2017 37th week	Jong PSV	1–0	SC Telstar	Eindhoven
20:00	Albert Gudmundsson 74'	Report		Stadium: De Herdgang; Attendance: 520

5 May 2017 38th week	SC Telstar	1–2	VVV-Venlo	Velsen-Zuid
20:00	Fabian Serrarens 33'	Report	Ralf Seuntjens 71'; Clint Leemans 87'	Stadium: Sportpark Schoonenberg; Attendance: 1,663

=== KNVB Cup ===
20 September 2016 1st round	JVC Cuijk	1–3	SC Telstar	Cuijk
18:30	Jorrit Ritzen 64'	Report	Mohammed Ajnane 14'; Denis Mahmudov 38'; Liban Abdulahi 90+4'	Stadium: De Groenendijkse Kampen; Attendance: 400

25 October 2016 2nd round	ADO Den Haag	2–1	SC Telstar	The Hague
20:00	Mike Havenaar 73'; Dennis van der Heijden 81'	Report	Denis Mahmudov 39'	Stadium: Kyocera Stadion; Attendance: 5,106

== Statistics ==
=== Scorers ===
#	Player	Eerste Divisie	KNVB	Total
1	(Netherlands) Fabian Serrarens	8	0	8
2	(North Macedonia) Denis Mahmudov	4	2	6
2	(Netherlands) Mohammed Ajnane	5	1	6
4	(Somalia) Liban Abdulahi	4	1	5
5	(Netherlands) Guyon Philips	4	0	4
6	(Netherlands) Crescendo van Berkel	3	0	3
6	(Japan) Naoyuki Yamazaki	3	0	3
6	(Netherlands) Oussama Zamouri	3	0	3
6	(Indonesia) Stefano Lilipaly	3	0	3
10	(New Zealand) Benjamin van den Broek	2	0	2
10	(Netherlands) Orhan Džepar	2	0	2
12	(Netherlands) Donny van Iperen	1	0	1
12	(Netherlands) Floris van der Linden	1	0	1
12	(Netherlands) Joël Donald	1	0	1
12	(Netherlands) Jordy Tutuarima	1	0	1
12	(Netherlands) Toine van Huizen	1	0	1

=== Appearances ===
#	Player	Eerste Divisie	KNVB	Total
1	(Netherlands) Jordy Tutuarima	37	0	37
2	(Somalia) Liban Abdulahi	34	2	36
3	(New Zealand) Benjamin van den Broek	33	2	35
4	(Netherlands) Fabian Serrarens	31	1	32
5	(Netherlands) Oussama Zamouri	30	1	31
6	(Netherlands) Orhan Džepar	28	2	30
7	(North Macedonia) Denis Mahmudov	26	2	28
8	(Netherlands) Toine van Huizen	26	1	27
9	(Japan) Naoyuki Yamazaki	25	1	26
10	(Netherlands) Donny van Iperen	24	1	25
11	(Netherlands) Crescendo van Berkel	23	1	24
12	(Netherlands) Bryan Ottenhoff	21	2	23
13	(Netherlands) Boy de Jong	20	2	22
13	(Netherlands) Guyon Philips	20	2	22
15	(Netherlands) Frank Korpershoek	21	0	21
15	(Netherlands) Mohammed Ajnane	20	1	21
17	(Netherlands) Wesley Zonneveld	20	0	20
17	(Netherlands) Joël Donald	19	1	20
19	(Netherlands) Floris van der Linden	18	0	18
20	(Indonesia) Stefano Lilipaly	14	1	15
21	(Netherlands) Thomas van den Houten	13	1	14
22	(Netherlands) Edo Knol	9	1	10
23	(Turkey) Çağrı Kodalak	4	0	4
23	(Netherlands) Calvin Valies	4	0	4
25	(Armenia) Norair Aslanyan	3	0	3
25	(Netherlands) Tom Beissel	3	0	3

=== Clean sheets ===
#	Player	Eerste Divisie
1	(Netherlands) Wesley Zonneveld	5
2	(Netherlands) Boy de Jong	3
Total		8

=== Disciplinary record ===
#	Player	Eerste Divisie		KNVB		Total	
#	Player	Yellow card	Red card	Yellow card	Red card	Yellow card	Red card
1	(Netherlands) Bryan Ottenhoff	2	2	1	0	3	2
2	(Netherlands) Crescendo van Berkel	4	1	0	0	4	1
3	(Netherlands) Benjamin van den Broek	3	1	0	0	3	1
4	(Netherlands) Wesley Zonneveld	1	1	0	0	1	1
4	(Netherlands) Mohammed Ajnane	1	1	0	0	1	1
6	(Netherlands) Stefano Lilipaly	0	1	0	0	0	1
7	(Netherlands) Fabian Serrarens	7	0	1	0	8	0
8	(Netherlands) Donny van Iperen	6	0	0	0	6	0
9	(Netherlands) Jordy Tutuarima	5	0	0	0	5	0
9	(Netherlands) Toine van Huizen	5	0	0	0	5	0
9	(Netherlands) Frank Korpershoek	5	0	0	0	5	0
12	(Netherlands) Orhan Džepar	2	0	1	0	3	0
12	(Morocco) Floris van der Linden	3	0	0	0	3	0
14	(Turkey) Çağrı Kodalak	2	0	0	0	2	0
14	(Japan) Naoyuki Yamazaki	2	0	0	0	2	0
14	(Netherlands) Oussama Zamouri	2	0	0	0	2	0
14	(Netherlands) Thomas van den Houten	2	0	0	0	2	0
14	(Netherlands) Guyon Philips	1	0	1	0	2	0
14	(Netherlands) Edo Knol	2	0	0	0	2	0
20	(Netherlands) Joël Donald	1	0	0	0	1	0
20	(Somalia) Liban Abdulahi	1	0	0	0	1	0
20	(North Macedonia) Denis Mahmudov	0	0	1	0	1	0
20	(Netherlands) Boy de Jong	1	0	0	0	1	0
