= Jermano Lo Fo Sang =

Dutch footballer (born 1991)

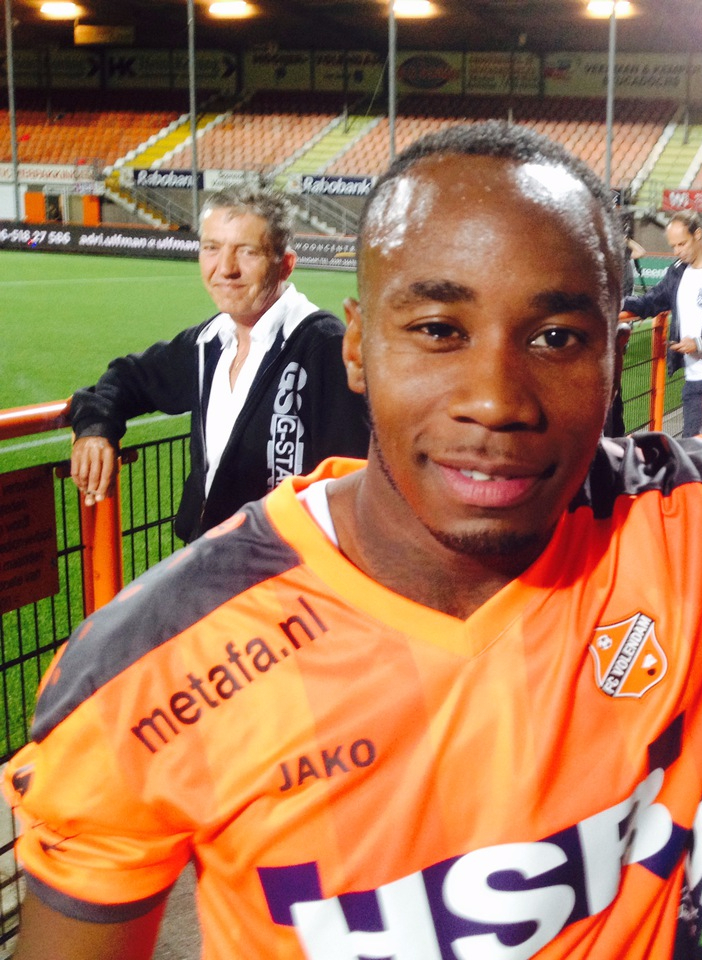

Personal information
- Full name: Jermano Lo Fo Sang
- Date of birth: 11 November 1991 (age 35)
- Place of birth: Amsterdam, Netherlands
- Height: 1.79 m (5 ft 10 1/2 in)
- Position: Left-back

Team information
- Current team: VVSB
- Number: 15

Youth career
- 1998–2005: Ajax
- 2005–2010: Haarlem
- 2010–2011: Zeeburgia

Senior career*
Years	Team	Apps	(Gls)
2010–2011	ZVV ter Beek		
2011–2014	OFC Oostzaan		
2014–2017	Volendam	53	(0)
2017	AFC		
2018	Karabakh Wien	8	(0)
2019–2021	OFC Oostzaan		
2021–2022	Olympia Haarlem		
2022–	VVSB	35	(1)
- * Club domestic league appearances and goals as of 19:52, 6 March 2023 (UTC)

Jermano Lo Fo Sang (born 11 November 1991) is a Dutch professional football player who plays as a left-back for VVSB in the Derde Divisie.

== Club career ==
Played in the youth academies of Ajax and Haarlem. When the club went bankrupt in 2010, he came to Zeeburgia where he left quickly. He played indoor football at ZVV ter Beek Amsterdam in Diemen and ended up at OFC Oostzaan in 2011. He played there for three years and promoted from the third class to the main class. Then in the summer of 2014 he was attracted by Volendam, then in the Eerste Divisie.

Made her debut on 15 August 2014 in professional football. On that day, Volendam lost 0–2 in his own home from NEC Nijmegen. Lo Fo Sang came in for 82 minutes for Oscar Wilffert. Lo Fo Sang extended his contract at Volendam in mid-August 2015 until mid-2017, with an option for another year. At the beginning of 2017, his contract was immediately terminated due to, among other things, private circumstances. In the summer of 2017, he spent two weeks at AFC before they split up. In January 2018, Lo Fo Sang joined the Austrian FC Karabakh Wien.

At the end of November 2018 it was confirmed, that Lo Fo Sang would return to OFC Oostzaan for the second half of the season. In the summer 2021, he moved to Olympia Haarlem. In February 2022, he joined VVSB.
