= Adarabioyo =

Adárabíọ̀yọ́
- Gender: Male
- Language: Yoruba

Origin
- Origin: Nigeria
- Meaning: As beautiful/good as Ọ̀yọ́ town/people.
- Region of origin: South West, Nigeria

Adárabíọ̀yọ́ is a Yoruba name commonly used as a surname in Nigeria. It means "As beautiful/good as Ọ̀yọ́ town/people." The name Adárabíọ̀yọ́ signifies strength, wisdom, and respect, reflecting the values of the Oyo people, the ancient town and its culture.

== Notable individuals with the name ==
- Fisayo Adarabioyo (born 1995), English footballer.
- Tosin Adarabioyo (born 1997), English footballer, brother of Fisayo.
