= Oussama Zamouri =

Moroccan footballer (born 1996)

Personal information
- Date of birth: 18 February 1996 (age 30)
- Place of birth: Timdghart, Morocco
- Height: 1.76 m (5 ft 9 in)
- Position: Winger

Youth career
- –2010: DWS
- 2010–2012: Almere City
- 2012–2014: Vitesse
- 2014–2015: Utrecht

Senior career*
| Years | Team | Apps | (Gls) |
| 2016–2018 | Telstar | 40 | (3) |
| 2018–2019 | Dordrecht | 30 | (9) |
| 2019–2020 | Oxford United | 0 | (0) |
| 2020 | Inter Zaprešić | 11 | (0) |
| 2020–2021 | MVV | 15 | (1) |
- * Club domestic league appearances and goals as of 26 March 2021

Oussama Zamouri (born 18 February 1996) is a Moroccan professional footballer who plays as a winger.

== Club career ==
He made his professional debut in the Eerste Divisie for Telstar on 8 August 2016 in a game against RKC Waalwijk.

On 2 September 2019, he signed for Oxford United. He left Oxford four months later, having made one appearance in the EFL Trophy. He then continued his career in Croatia with Inter Zaprešić, where he made eleven appearances.

In July 2020, Zamouri signed with MVV.

== Career statistics ==
As of match played 24 November 2020

Appearances and goals by club, season and competition
| Club | Season | League | | | National Cup | | League Cup | | Other | | Total | |
| Club | Season | Division | Apps | Goals | Apps | Goals | Apps | Goals | Apps | Goals | Apps | Goals |
|---|---|---|---|---|---|---|---|---|---|---|---|---|
| Telstar | 2016–17 | Eerste Divisie | 30 | 3 | 1 | 0 | 0 | 0 | 0 | 0 | 31 | 3 |
| Telstar | 2017–18 | Eerste Divisie | 10 | 0 | 1 | 0 | 0 | 0 | 1 (Note: Appearance(s) in Eredivisie Play-offs.) | 0 | 12 | 0 |
| Telstar | Telstar total | | 40 | 3 | 2 | 0 | 0 | 0 | 1 | 0 | 43 | 3 |
| Dordrecht | 2018–19 | Eerste Divisie | 30 | 9 | 1 | 0 | 0 | 0 | 0 | 0 | 30 | 9 |
| Oxford United | 2019–20 | League One | 0 | 0 | 0 | 0 | 0 | 0 | 1 (Note: Appearance in EFL Trophy.) | 0 | 1 | 0 |
| Inter Zaprešić | 2018–19 | 1. HNL | 11 | 0 | 0 | 0 | 0 | 0 | 0 | 0 | 11 | 0 |
| MVV | 2020–21 | Eerste Divisie | 8 | 0 | 0 | 0 | 0 | 0 | 0 | 0 | 8 | 0 |
| Career total | | | 89 | 12 | 3 | 0 | 0 | 0 | 2 | 0 | 93 | 12 |
