= Ali Abdulkadir =

Somali footballer

Personal information
- Full name: Ali Mohamed Abdulkadir
- Position: Forward

Team information
- Current team: Hilltop

Senior career*
Years	Team	Apps	(Gls)
–2020	Hillingdon Borough		
2020–	Hilltop		

International career^{‡}
2021–	Somalia	2	(0)
- * Club domestic league appearances and goals as of 18:00, 22 June 2021 (UTC) ‡ National team caps and goals as of 18:00, 22 June 2021 (UTC)

Ali Mohamed Abdulkadir (Somali: Cali Maxamed Cabdulqaadir) is a Somali footballer who plays as a forward for Hilltop and the Somalia national team.

== Club career ==
During the 2019–20 Spartan South Midlands Football League season, Abdulkadir made five league appearances for Hillingdon Borough, before joining Hilltop.

== International career ==
On 15 June 2021, Abdulkadir made his debut for Somalia, in a 1–0 friendly loss against Djibouti.

== Personal life ==
Abdulkadir is cousins with fellow Somalia international Liban Abdulahi.
