= Oger Klos =

Dutch footballer (born 1993)

Oger Klose
Personal information
- Full name: Oger Klos
- Date of birth: 19 August 1993 (age 33)
- Place of birth: Amsterdam, Netherlands
- Height: 1.83 m (6 ft 0 in)
- Position: Midfielder

Youth career
- Zeeburgia
- Ajax
- Almere City

Senior career*
Years	Team	Apps	(Gls)
2012–2013	AGOVV Apeldoorn	17	(2)
2013–2014	Telstar	28	(1)
- * Club domestic league appearances and goals as of 16 June 2014 (UTC)

Oger Klos (born 19 August 1993 in Amsterdam) is a Dutch professional footballer who plays as a midfielder. He is currently without a club after having formerly played for AGOVV Apeldoorn and Telstar.
