= Raïes Roshanali =

Dutch footballer (born 1995)

Personal information
- Date of birth: 30 October 1995 (age 31)
- Place of birth: Amsterdam, Netherlands
- Height: 1.73 m (5 ft 8 in)
- Position: Midfielder

Team information
- Current team: Kruisland

Youth career
- Zeeburgia
- –2015: AZ

Senior career*
| Years | Team | Apps | (Gls) |
| 2015–2017 | FC Oss | 19 | (0) |
| 2017 | Dordrecht | 1 | (0) |
| 2018–2023 | Noordwijk | 113 | (14) |
| 2023–2024 | TEC | 15 | (2) |
| 2024 | Kozakken Boys | 12 | (1) |
| 2024– | Kruisland | | |

International career
| 2012 | Netherlands U18 | 1 | (0) |
- * Club domestic league appearances and goals as of 09:49, 2 June 2024 (UTC)

Raïes Roshanali (born 30 October 1995) is a Dutch footballer who plays as a midfielder for Eerste Klasse club Kruisland.

== Club career ==
He made his professional debut in the Eerste Divisie for FC Oss on 7 August 2015 in a game against FC Emmen. He then had a short stint with Dordrecht in 2017.

After six months as a free agent, Roshanali joined amateur club VV Noordwijk in the Derde Divisie in 2018. He grew into a key player for the club, mainly playing in the Tweede Divisie after promotion in 2019, and receiving interest from an unnamed Swedish club in 2020. After five years at Noordwijk, in which he made 119 total appearances in which he scored 16 goals, he left the club in 2023.

On 5 May 2023, Roshanali was announced as TEC's new signing for the 2023–24 season.

On 18 January 2024, after merely six months at TEC, Roshanali joined Tweede Divisie club Kozakken Boys. After their relegation to the Derde Divisie, he moved to Eerste Klasse club Kruisland.
