= Calvin Valies =

Dutch footballer (born 1995)

Personal information
- Full name: Calvin Moreno Valies
- Date of birth: 22 January 1995 (age 31)
- Place of birth: Amsterdam, Netherlands
- Height: 1.70 m (5 ft 7 in)
- Position: Defender

Team information
- Current team: OFC Oostzaan

Youth career
- 1999–2003: FC Amsterdam
- 2003–2004: Zeeburgia
- 2004–2010: Ajax
- 2010–2014: ADO Den Haag

Senior career*
Years	Team	Apps	(Gls)
2014–2017	Telstar	37	(2)
2017	Veria	4	(0)
2018	Luceafărul Oradea	9	(0)
2018	Syrianska FC	7	(1)
2019–	OFC Oostzaan	0	(0)
- * Club domestic league appearances and goals as of 20 February 2019

Calvin Moreno Valies (born 22 January 1995) is a Dutch football player of Surinamese descent who plays as a defender for OFC Oostzaan.

== Club career ==
He made his professional debut in the Eerste Divisie for SC Telstar on 11 August 2014 in a game against Jong Ajax.

Valies joined OFC Oostzaan in January 2019.
