= Jordy van der Winden =

Dutch footballer (born 1994)

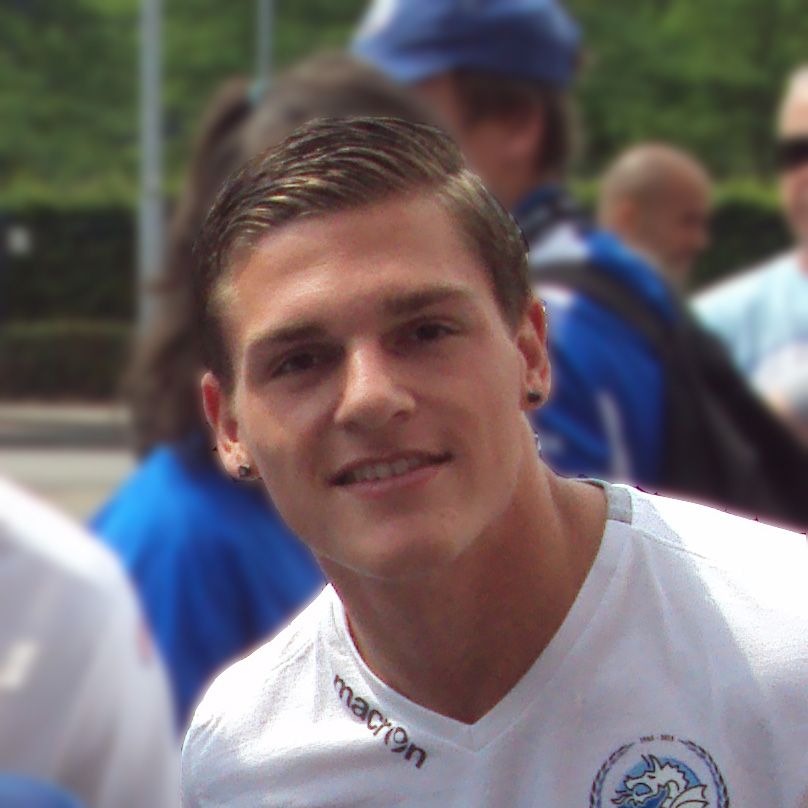
- Van der Winden in 2015

Personal information
- Date of birth: 4 March 1994 (age 32)
- Place of birth: The Hague, Netherlands
- Height: 1.77 m (5 ft 10 in)
- Position: Left-back

Youth career
- Haaglandia
- Spijkenisse
- Feyenoord
- ADO Den Haag
- Utrecht

Senior career*
Years	Team	Apps	(Gls)
2014–2015	Utrecht	2	(0)
2015–2023	Den Bosch	122	(5)
- * Club domestic league appearances and goals

Jordy van der Winden (born 4 March 1994) is a Dutch former professional footballer who played as a left-back.

== Club career ==
van der Winden was forced to retire from playing in July 2023 due to a knee injury.
