= Luis Orejuela =

Spanish footballer

Personal information
- Full name: Luis Orejuela de la Rosa
- Date of birth: 11 August 2007 (age 19)
- Place of birth: Palma, Spain
- Position: Left-back

Team information
- Current team: Mallorca B
- Number: 30

Youth career
- Penya Arrabal
- 2017–2024: Mallorca
- 2024–2025: San Francisco
- 2025–2026: Mallorca

Senior career*
Years	Team	Apps	(Gls)
2026–	Mallorca B	16	(4)
2026–	Mallorca	1	(0)
- * Club domestic league appearances and goals as of 13 September 2026

Luis Orejuela de la Rosa (born 26 April 2006) is a Spanish professional footballer who plays as a left-back for RCD Mallorca B.

== Career ==
Born in Palma, Mallorca, Balearic Islands, Orejuela joined RCD Mallorca's youth categories in 2017, aged ten, from AD Penya Arrabal. He made his senior debut with the reserves on 1 February 2026, starting in a 4–2 Tercera Federación home win over Inter Ibiza CD.

Orejuela made his professional – and La Liga – debut on 13 May 2026, playing the full 90 minutes in a 3–1 away loss to Getafe CF.

== Personal life ==
Orejuela is the third-cousin of Antonio Orejuela, a midfielder who also played for Mallorca.

== Career statistics ==
As of match played 13 September 2026

Appearances and goals by club, season and competition
Club	Season	League			Cup		Other		Total	
Club	Season	Division	Apps	Goals	Apps	Goals	Apps	Goals	Apps	Goals
Mallorca B	2025–26	Segunda Federación	14	4	—		—		14	4
Mallorca B	2026–27	Segunda Federación	2	0	—		—		2	0
Mallorca B	Total		16	4	—		—		16	4
Mallorca	2025–26	La Liga	1	0	—		—		1	0
Mallorca	2026–27	Segunda División	2	0	—		—		2	0
Mallorca	Total		3	0	—		—		3	0
Career total			18	4	0	0	0	0	18	4
