= Joël Donald =

Dutch footballer (born 1996)

Personal information
- Date of birth: 13 May 1996 (age 30)
- Place of birth: Amsterdam, Netherlands
- Position: Forward

Team information
- Current team: DEM
- Number: 16

Youth career
- SV Overbos
- Abcoude
- –2016: AZ

Senior career*
Years	Team	Apps	(Gls)
2016	Jong AZ	2	(0)
2016–2017	Telstar	19	(1)
2017–2018	Jong Groningen	29	(9)
2018–2019	Scheveningen	30	(5)
2019–2020	Koninklijke HFC	21	(4)
2020–2023	OFC	36	(7)
2023–2024	HBOK		
2024–	DEM	0	(0)

International career
2011-2012	Netherlands U16	6	(1)
- * Club domestic league appearances and goals as of 7 October 2024

Joël Donald (born 13 May 1996) is a Dutch footballer who plays as a forward for DEM in the Dutch Derde Divisie.

== Club career ==
He made his professional debut in the Eerste Divisie for SC Telstar on 9 September 2016 in a game against De Graafschap.

== International career ==
Donald earned 6 caps for the Netherlands national under-16 football team.

== Personal life ==
He is a younger brother of footballer Mitchell Donald. Born in the Netherlands, Donald is of Surinamese descent.

== Career statistics ==
=== Club ===
As of 5 May 2017

Appearances and goals by club, season and competition
Club	Season	League			KNVB Cup		Other		Total	
Club	Season	Division	Apps	Goals	Apps	Goals	Apps	Goals	Apps	Goals
Jong AZ	2016–17	Tweede Divisie	2	0	0	0	0	0	2	0
Telstar	2016–17	Eerste Divisie	19	1	?	?	?	?	19	1
Groningen	2017–18	Eredivisie	0	0	0	0	0	0	0	0
