= Joakim Balmy =

French footballer (born 1997)

Personal information
- Date of birth: 17 September 1997 (age 29)
- Place of birth: Mantes-la-Jolie, France
- Height: 1.79 m (5 ft 10 in)
- Position: Defender

Team information
- Current team: Jura Dolois

Senior career*
| Years | Team | Apps | (Gls) |
| 2015–2018 | Nice II | 34 | (1) |
| 2018 | Telstar | 1 | (0) |
| 2018–2019 | Cherno More Varna | 1 | (0) |
| 2019–2020 | Fréjus St-Raphaël | 7 | (0) |
| 2020–2021 | Deauville | | |
| 2021–2023 | Olympique Alès | 29 | (3) |
| 2023– | Jura Dolois | 30 | (0) |
- * Club domestic league appearances and goals as of 30 November 2024

Joakim Balmy (Arabic: حكيم جو بالمي; born 17 September 1997) is a French footballer who plays for Championnat National 3 club Jura Dolois.

== Career ==
Balmy started his career with Nice in the French Ligue 1, where he was on the bench on 4 occasions but never made an appearance. After that, he made one appearance for Dutch second division side Telstar and Bulgarian club Cherno More Varna before joining Fréjus St-Raphaël in the French fourth division.

== Personal life ==
Born in France, Balmy is of Algerian descent.
