= Orhan Džepar =

Dutch footballer (born 1996)

Personal information
- Date of birth: 13 June 1996 (age 30)
- Place of birth: Eefde, Netherlands
- Height: 1.92 m (6 ft 4 in)
- Position: Midfielder

Team information
- Current team: Cosenza

Youth career
- SP Eefde
- –2014: FC Zutphen
- 2014–2015: Go Ahead Eagles

Senior career*
Years	Team	Apps	(Gls)
2015–2019	Go Ahead Eagles	48	(4)
2016–2017	→ Telstar (loan)	28	(2)
2019–2021	Helmond Sport	51	(1)
2021–2023	MVV	61	(8)
2023–2025	Roda JC	47	(2)
2025–2026	Olympiakos Nicosia	29	(0)
2026–	Cosenza	0	(0)
- * Club domestic league appearances and goals as of 14 June 2026

Orhan Džepar (born 13 June 1996) is a Dutch professional footballer who played as a midfielder for Serie C Group C club Cosenza.

== Club career ==
=== Go Ahead Eagles ===
Džepar was born in Eefde, Gelderland, to parents Sule and Amela who fled from the Bosnian War in the early 1990s. He played youth football for SP Eefde and FC Zutphen, before joining the Go Ahead Eagles academy in 2014. He made his professional debut in the Eerste Divisie for that club on 16 August 2015 in a game against Telstar, replacing Sander Duits in the 64th minute and heading in his first goal twelve minutes later in a 5–0 home win.

He was sent on loan to Telstar for the 2016–17 season in August 2016. At the end of the season he suffered a muscle strain.

=== Helmond Sport ===
On 26 June 2019, Džepar signed a two-year contract with Eerste Divisie club Helmond Sport. He made his debut for the club as a starter on the opening matchday of the 2019–20 season in a 1–1 home draw against FC Volendam. On 13 September he scored his first goal for the club in Helmond's 5–1 away loss to Cambuur.

=== MVV ===
On 14 July 2021, he joined MVV on a two-year contract. He scored on his competitive debut for the club which proved to be the winning goal in a 1–0 victory away at Jong Utrecht.

Džepar left MVV as his contract ran out in June 2023, making him a free agent. He finished his stint with MVV with eight goals in 65 appearances.

=== Roda JC ===
On 30 August 2023, Džepar signed a two-year contract with Roda JC. On 9 September, he made his competitive debut for De Koempels, replacing Walid Ould-Chikh in the 65th minute of a 3–1 away victory against NAC Breda.

In September 2024, Džepar attracted national attention after scoring the winning goal in a derby victory over his former club MVV. Following the match, he received a number of death threats via social media, which he made public to raise awareness of abuse in football. He stated that the threats, some of which targeted his family, had crossed a line and expressed hope that his decision to speak out would act as a deterrent. The gesture was widely reported in the Dutch media and prompted a message of support and a floral gesture from MVV.

In May 2025, Roda JC confirmed that Džepar would leave the club following the expiration of his contract at the end of the 2024–25 season.

=== Olympiakos Nicosia ===
On 18 July 2025, Džepar signed a one-year contract with an option for an additional year with recently promoted Cypriot First Division club Olympiakos Nicosia.

== Personal life ==
Džepar studied engineering before being scouted by Go Ahead Eagles at age 18.

== Career statistics ==
As of match played 19 April 2025

Appearances and goals by club, season and competition
Club	Season	League			KNVB Cup		Other		Total	
Club	Season	Division	Apps	Goals	Apps	Goals	Apps	Goals	Apps	Goals
Go Ahead Eagles	2015–16	Eerste Divisie	13	2	1	0	0	0	14	2
Go Ahead Eagles	2016–17	Eredivisie	0	0	0	0	—		0	0
Go Ahead Eagles	2017–18	Eerste Divisie	10	0	0	0	0	0	10	0
Go Ahead Eagles	2018–19	Eerste Divisie	25	2	1	0	0	0	26	2
Go Ahead Eagles	Total		48	4	2	0	0	0	50	4
Telstar (loan)	2016–17	Eerste Divisie	28	2	2	0	—		30	2
Helmond Sport	2019–20	Eerste Divisie	27	1	1	0	—		31	0
Helmond Sport	2020–21	Eerste Divisie	24	0	1	0	—		20	5
Helmond Sport	Total		51	1	2	0	—		53	1
MVV	2021–22	Eerste Divisie	31	7	2	0	—		33	7
MVV	2022–23	Eerste Divisie	30	1	0	0	2 (Note: Appearances in Eredivisie promotion/relegation playoffs)	0	32	1
MVV	Total		61	8	2	0	2	0	65	8
Roda JC	2023–24	Eerste Divisie	16	0	1	0	2	0	19	0
Roda JC	2024–25	Eerste Divisie	31	2	1	0	—		32	2
Roda JC	Total		47	2	2	0	2	0	51	2
Olympiakos Nicosia	2025–26	Cypriot First Division	0	0	0	0	—		0	0
Career total			235	17	10	0	4	0	249	17
