= Boy de Jong =

Dutch footballer

Personal information
- Full name: Boy de Jong
- Date of birth: 10 April 1994 (age 32)
- Place of birth: Voorburg, Netherlands
- Height: 1.82 m (6 ft 0 in)
- Position: Goalkeeper

Team information
- Current team: VV Zwaluwen (player); Feyenoord (youth gk coach)
- Number: 1

Youth career
- –2001: TONEGIDO
- 2001–2007: ADO Den Haag
- 2007–2013: Feyenoord

Senior career*
Years	Team	Apps	(Gls)
2013–2014	Feyenoord	0	(0)
2013–2014	→ Excelsior (loan)	0	(0)
2014–2016	PEC Zwolle	1	(0)
2016–2017	Telstar	20	(0)
2017–2019	Anderlecht	0	(0)
2019–2020	Stellenbosch	17	(0)
2020–2021	Katwijk	5	(0)
2021–	VV Zwaluwen		

International career
2009–2010	Netherlands U16	5	(0)
2010–2011	Netherlands U17	14	(0)
2011	Netherlands U18	1	(0)
2012–2013	Netherlands U19	6	(0)

Managerial career
- 2020–: Feyenoord (youth gk coach)
Medal record
Men's football
Representing Netherlands
UEFA European Under-17 Championship
Winner	2011 Serbia
- * Club domestic league appearances and goals as of 16:45, 23 January 2022 (UTC)

Boy de Jong (born 10 April 1994) is a Dutch footballer who plays as a goalkeeper for VV Zwaluwen. He also works for Feyenoord as a goalkeeper coach on the club's academy.

== Club career ==
=== Early career ===
De Jong was born in Voorburg and played in the youth teams of ADO Den Haag, before moving to Feyenoord, where he was a first-choice goalkeeper throughout Feyenoord's youth academy. However, he was unable to find playing time for the first team, with Erwin Mulder and Kostas Lamprou ahead of him in the pecking order. In June 2013, it was announced that De Jong would be loaned to Excelsior for one season in order to gain first-team experience. However, he would only play one friendly match for Excelsior, as manager Jon Dahl Tomasson and his replacement Marinus Dijkhuizen both preferred Jordy Deckers as the starting goalkeeper. In January 2014, De Jong criticised Feyenoord for not supporting him at Excelsior.

=== PEC Zwolle ===
In the summer of 2014, De Jong moved to PEC Zwolle on a free transfer, signing a contract for two seasons. In his first season, he made no appearances as third-choice goalkeeper behind Warner Hahn and Kevin Begois. In the 2015–16 season, Hahn left Zwolle, but De Jong remained third-choice, behind Begois and new signing Mickey van der Hart. Nevertheless, on 19 December 2015, De Jong made his debut in the Eredivisie in an away match against PSV, being substituted on after half an hour due to an injury to Begois. PEC Zwolle manager Ron Jans considered his performance "a fine job." De Jong made one more appearance during the season, starting in the Europa League play-offs away match against FC Utrecht, which they lost 5–2. At the end of the season, his contract was not extended.

=== Telstar ===
On 23 June 2016, De Jong started training with SC Telstar. On 29 July 2016, it was announced that both parties had agreed to a one-season contract. De Jong made his debut for Telstar on 20 September 2016, playing in the KNVB Cup away match against JVC Cuijk (3–1 win). Three days later, he made his Eerste Divisie league debut, replacing the injured Wesley Zonneveld in the fourth minute of the home match against FC Eindhoven (1–4 loss). On 30 September, he started in the away match against FC Den Bosch, keeping the first clean sheet of his senior career as the game ended 0–0. Due to a serious injury sustained by Zonneveld in January 2017, De Jong became the first choice goalkeeper for Telstar for the remainder of the season. He ended his first season with the club with 20 league appearances and 22 in total. At the start of the 2017–18 season, De Jong once again found himself second-choice, as the new head coach Mike Snoei preferred Rody de Boer as the starting goalkeeper.

=== Anderlecht ===
On 24 August 2017, it was announced that De Jong had joined Belgian champions Anderlecht, as a replacement for Davy Roef. According to De Jong, he was signed as third goalkeeper behind Matz Sels and Frank Boeckx. Since his father Max de Jong already worked at Anderlecht as goalkeeper coach, allegations of nepotism were made, but De Jong denied that it was his father who decided on the transfer. On 21 January 2018, during a league away match against Genk, De Jong was on the substitute bench for the first time, replacing the injured Boeckx. For the remainder of the season, he served as back-up goalkeeper due to Boeckx' long-term injury, but did not make an appearance.

On 22 June 2018, De Jong signed a contract extension, keeping him at the club for one more year. During the 2018–19 season, he again did not feature in an official match, being third-choice goalkeeper behind new signing Thomas Didillon and Boeckx. At the end of the season, his contract was not extended, upon which De Jong expressed his fondness of the club and having had the experience of UEFA Champions League and UEFA Europa League matches during his time there.

=== Stellenbosch ===
On 4 July 2019, it was announced De Jong had signed a contract with South African club Stellenbosch F.C., who were newly promoted to the country's highest division. On 3 August 2019, he made his debut for Stellenbosch in the first league match of the season, starting and keeping a clean sheet in the 0–0 draw against Chippa United. On 26 March 2020, it was announced De Jong had terminated his contract with the club to return to the Netherlands, in the light of the COVID-19 pandemic. In total, De Jong played 17 league matches for Stellenbosch.

=== Later career ===
In June 2020, De Jong joined Dutch Tweede Divisie club VV Katwijk. In October 2020, he was also hired as a goalkeeper coach at the academy of his former club, Feyenoord.

In the summer 2021, De Jong then moved to VV Zwaluwen, after the deal was confirmed in March 2021.

== International career ==
As a Feyenoord youth player, De Jong played in various Netherlands national youth teams. He was the starting goalkeeper of the Netherlands team which was victorious at the 2011 European Under-17 Championship.

== Personal life ==
On 5 August 2018, De Jong became a father. His partner gave birth to a daughter, named Philou Lovée.

== Career statistics ==
As of 17 May 2020

Appearances and goals by club, season and competition
Club	Season	League			Cup		Continental^{1}		Other^{2}		Total	
Club	Season	Division	Apps	Goals	Apps	Goals	Apps	Goals	Apps	Goals	Apps	Goals
Feyenoord	2013–14	Eredivisie	0	0	0	0	0	0	—		0	0
Excelsior (loan)	2013–14	Eerste Divisie	0	0	0	0	—		0	0	0	0
PEC Zwolle	2014–15	Eredivisie	0	0	0	0	0	0	0	0	0	0
PEC Zwolle	2015–16	Eredivisie	1	0	0	0	—		1	0	2	0
PEC Zwolle	Total		1	0	0	0	0	0	1	0	2	0
Telstar	2016–17	Eerste Divisie	20	0	2	0	—				22	0
Anderlecht	2017–18	First Division A	0	0	0	0	0	0	0	0	0	0
Anderlecht	2018–19	First Division A	0	0	0	0	0	0	0	0	0	0
Anderlecht	Total		0	0	0	0	0	0	0	0	0	0
Stellenbosch	2019–20	Premier Division	17	0	0	0	—		0	0	17	0
Career total			38	0	2	0	0	0	1	0	41	0

^{1} Includes UEFA Champions League and UEFA Europa League matches.

^{2} Includes Johan Cruyff Shield and Play-off matches.

== Honours ==
=== Club ===
PEC Zwolle

- Johan Cruyff Shield: 2014

=== International ===
Netherlands U17

- European Under-17 Championship: 2011
