= Júnior (footballer, born 1988) =

Brazilian footballer

Personal information
- Full name: Júnior Toretta Ernandes
- Date of birth: May 7, 1988 (age 38)
- Place of birth: Linhares, Brazil
- Height: 1.80 m (5 ft 11 in)
- Position: Midfielder

Youth career
- 2006–2007: Vitória
- 2007–2008: Sport Club Internacional
- 2008–2009: Estrela do Norte

Senior career*
Years	Team	Apps	(Gls)
2008–2009	Estrela do Norte		
2009	→ Bahia (loan)	4	(0)
2009–2010	Gol Gohar	5	(1)
2010–2012	Paykan	40	(10)
2012–2013	Saipa	23	(8)
2016–2017	Linhares		
2017–2018	SC Telstar	18	(10)
- * Club domestic league appearances and goals as of 12 September 2017

Júnior Toretta Ernandes, known as Júnior (born May 7, 1988) is a Brazilian footballer who last played for SC Telstar.

== Club career ==
Junior joined Paykan in 2010 after spending the previous season at Gol Gohar in the Azadegan League.

Club performance			League	
Season	Club	League	Apps	Goals
Iran			League	
2010–11	Paykan	Pro League	21	2
2011–12	Paykan	Division 1	19	5
2012–13	Saipa	Pro League	21	1
Career total			61	8

- Assist Goals

Season	Team	Assists
10-11	Paykan	1
