= Bryan Ottenhoff =

Dutch footballer

Personal information
- Date of birth: 8 July 1991 (age 35)
- Place of birth: Amsterdam, Netherlands
- Height: 1.87 m (6 ft 1 1/2 in)
- Position: Centre back

Team information
- Current team: OFC Oostzaan
- Number: 26

Youth career
- Ajax
- VA FC Twente

Senior career*
Years	Team	Apps	(Gls)
2013–2014	Almere City	29	(0)
2014–2015	Oțelul Galați	0	(0)
2015–2017	Telstar	45	(0)
2017–	OFC Oostzaan	9	(1)
- * Club domestic league appearances and goals as of 7 January 2018

Bryan Ottenhoff (born 8 July 1991) is a Dutch professional footballer who plays as a centre back for OFC Oostzaan in the Dutch Derde Divisie. He formerly played for Almere City and Oțelul Galați.
