= Dennis Kaars =

Dutch footballer

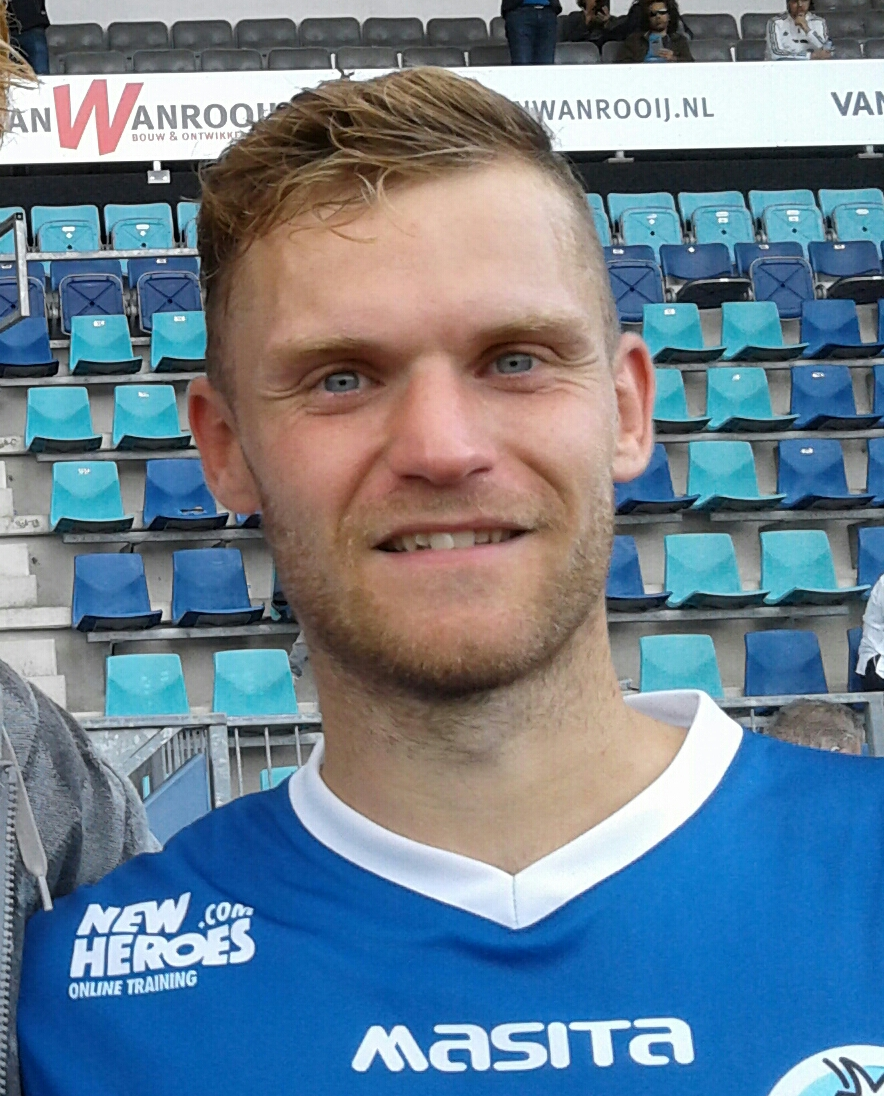

Personal information
- Date of birth: 17 June 1988 (age 38)
- Place of birth: Purmerend, Netherlands
- Height: 1.79 m (5 ft 10 in)
- Position: Forward

Team information
- Current team: JOS

Youth career
- –2006: Monnickendam

Senior career*
Years	Team	Apps	(Gls)
2006–2007	Monnickendam		
2007–2011	VV HBOK		
2011–2014	Ajax Amateurs		
2014–2017	De Dijk	31	(41)
2017–2018	Den Bosch	31	(6)
2018–2020	Quick Boys	46	(14)
2020–2024	VV HBOK		
2024–	JOS		
- * Club domestic league appearances and goals as of 22 November 2024

Dennis Kaars (born 7 June 1988) is a Dutch footballer who plays as a forward for JOS.

== Club career ==
He made his Eerste Divisie debut for FC Den Bosch on 18 August 2017 in a game against Jong AZ.
