= Niek Versteegen =

Dutch footballer

Personal information
- Date of birth: 12 October 1994 (age 32)
- Place of birth: Ysselsteyn, Netherlands
- Height: 1.83 m (6 ft 0 in)
- Position: Forward

Team information
- Current team: Venray
- Number: 7

Senior career*
Years	Team	Apps	(Gls)
–2016	Venray		
2016–2018	Achilles '29	47	(21)
2018–2019	De Treffers	24	(12)
2019–	Venray		
- * Club domestic league appearances and goals as of 4 May 2019

Niek Versteegen (born 12 October 1994) is a Dutch footballer who plays as a forward for Venray.

== Club career ==
He made his professional debut in the Eerste Divisie for Achilles '29 on 16 September 2016 in a game against SC Telstar and scored a goal 5 minutes after coming on as a substitute.

In the summer 2019, Versteegen joined SV Venray.
