= Chisom Leonard Johnson =

Dutch footballer (born 1993)

Leonard Johnson
Personal information
- Full name: Chisom Leonard Johnson
- Date of birth: 28 October 1993 (age 33)
- Place of birth: Amsterdam, Netherlands
- Height: 1.83 m (6 ft 0 in)
- Position: Right winger

Team information
- Current team: Rimal Al-Sahra
- Number: 77

Senior career*
Years	Team	Apps	(Gls)
–2014	Farense		
2014–2015	Nikos & Sokratis Erimis	8	(2)
2015–2016	Karmiotissa	3	(0)
2016	Roccella	16	(4)
2016	AS Trenčín	5	(0)
2017–2018	Telstar	2	(0)
2023–2024	VV DOVO	36	(3)
2025–	Rimal Al-Sahra	8	(3)
- * Club domestic league appearances and goals as of 13 February 2019

Chisom Leonard Johnson (born 28 October 1993) is a Dutch football who plays for Rimal Al-Sahra as a forward.

== Club career ==
=== AS Trenčín ===
Johnson made his professional Fortuna Liga debut for AS Trenčín against FC DAC 1904 Dunajská Streda on 13 August 2016.

=== SC Telstar ===
In July 2017, Johnson signed with SC Telstar. In the beginning of 2018, Johnson received the message, that he wouldn't play anymore for the club. He was excluded from training by the club, because he no longer fitted into the plans of the club's head coach. Because the club didn't have a reserve team, this exclusion meant that Johnson actually had to sit at home. Johnson did not agree with this course and went to VVSC. After finding no solution, the case was presented to KNVB. The Commission considered the exclusion of Johnson as substantial. Johnson began training again, while Telstar was sentenced a penalty.
