= Eefde =

- Village
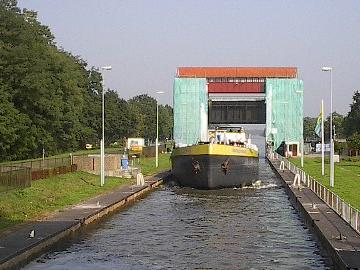
- Lock at Eefde

- Location in the Netherlands Eefde (Netherlands)
- Coordinates: 52.1708°N 6.2251°E
- Country: Netherlands
- Province: Gelderland
- Municipality: Lochem

Area
  - Total: 14.22 km^{2} (5.49 sq mi)
- Elevation: 8 m (26 ft)

Population (2021)
  - Total: 4,445
  - Density: 312.6/km^{2} (809.6/sq mi)
- Time zone: UTC+1 (CET)
  - Summer (DST): UTC+2 (CEST)
- Postal code: 7211
- Dialing code: 0575

Eefde is a village in the Dutch province of Gelderland. It is located in the municipality of Lochem, about 3 km northeast of the city of Zutphen.

== Overview ==
It was first mentioned between 1294 and 1295 as Evede, and might relate to a sheep (English: ewe for female sheep). In 1840, it was home to 709 people. After World War II, it started to developed as a suburb of Zutphen.

There is a legend that Witte Wieven appear on that village every Christmas Eve, and dance on a Hill named Wittenwievenbult (Wise woman hill), after the white woman.

== Gallery ==
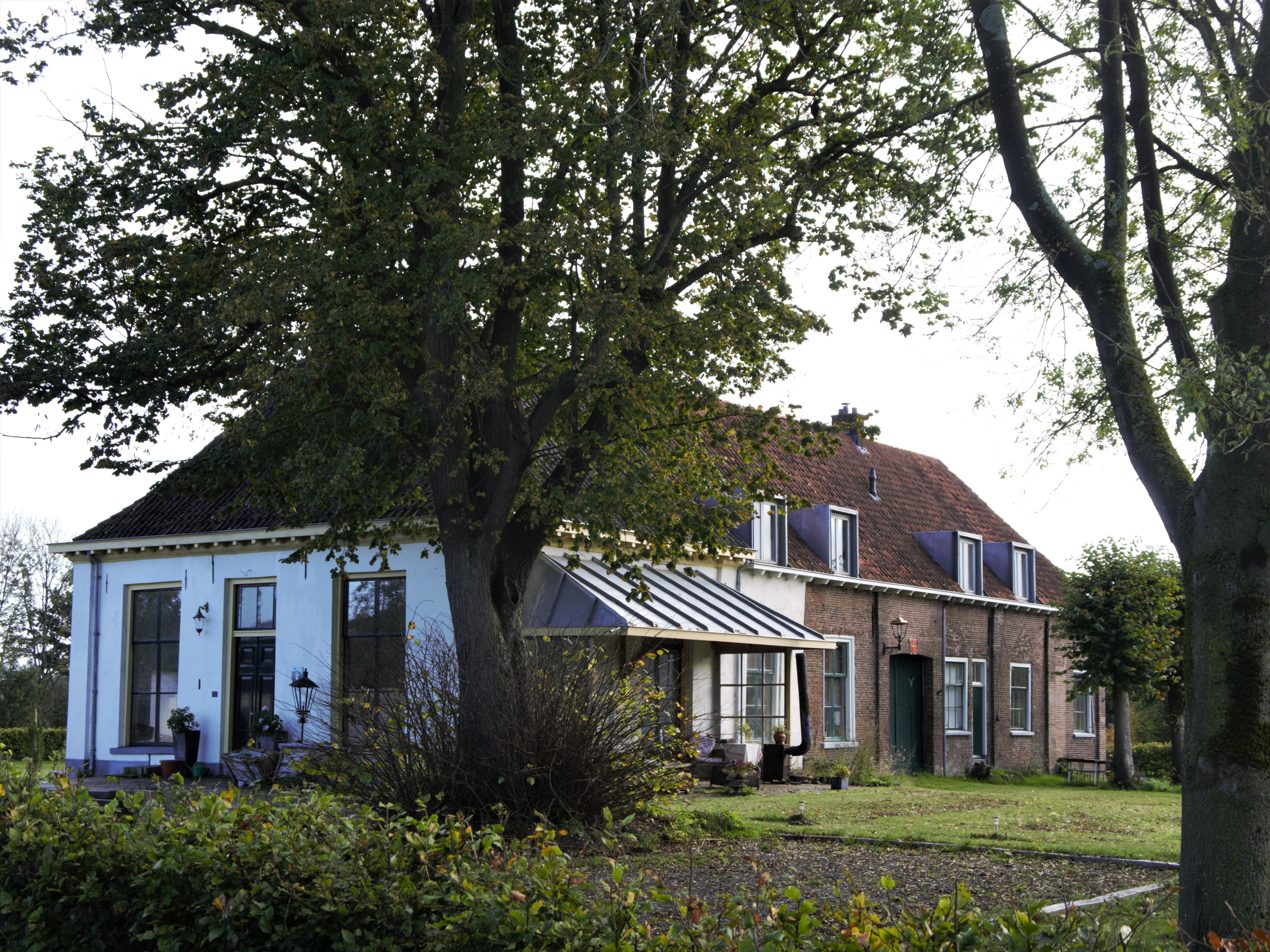
Farm in Eefde

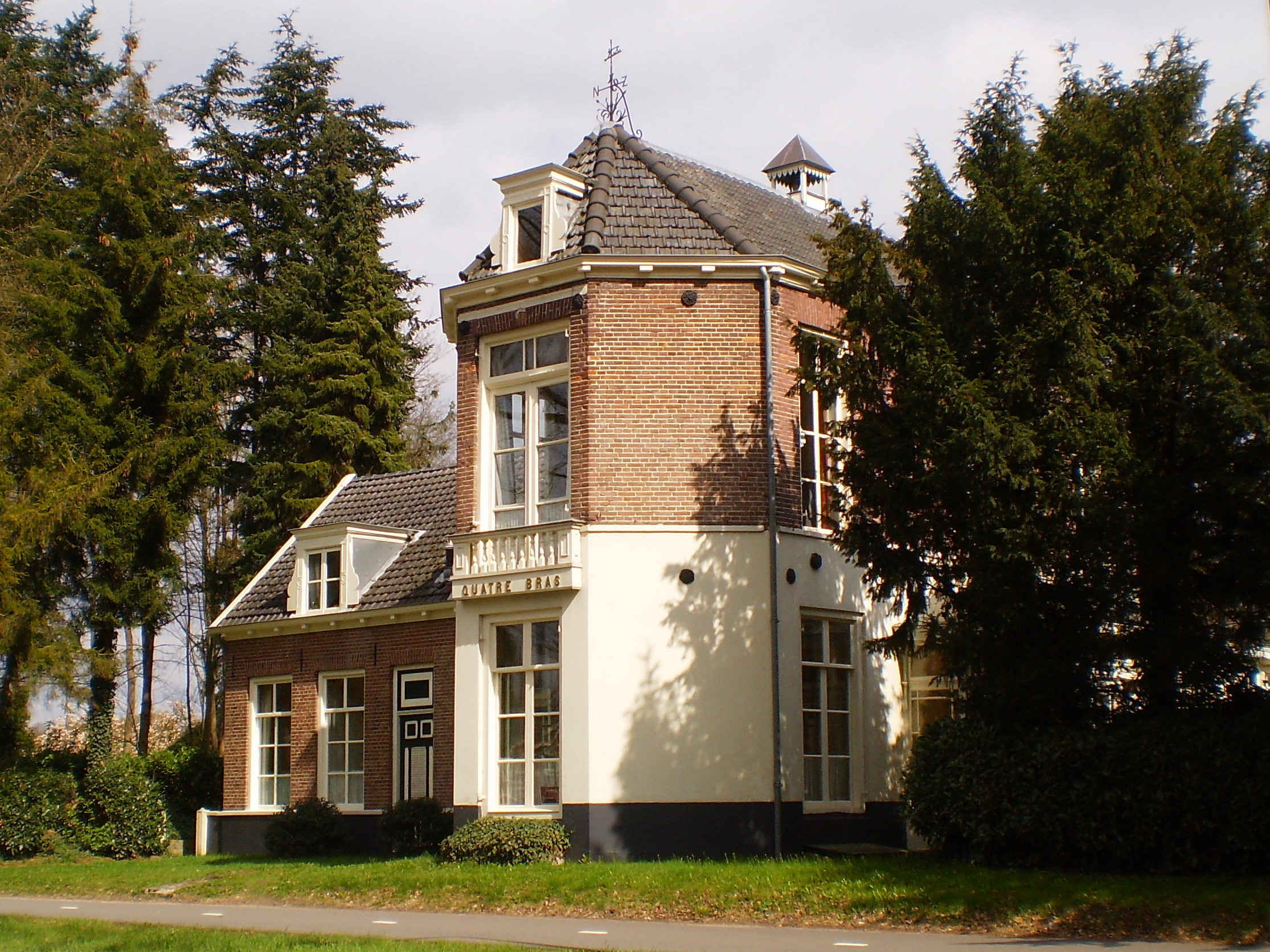
Villa "Quatre Bras"

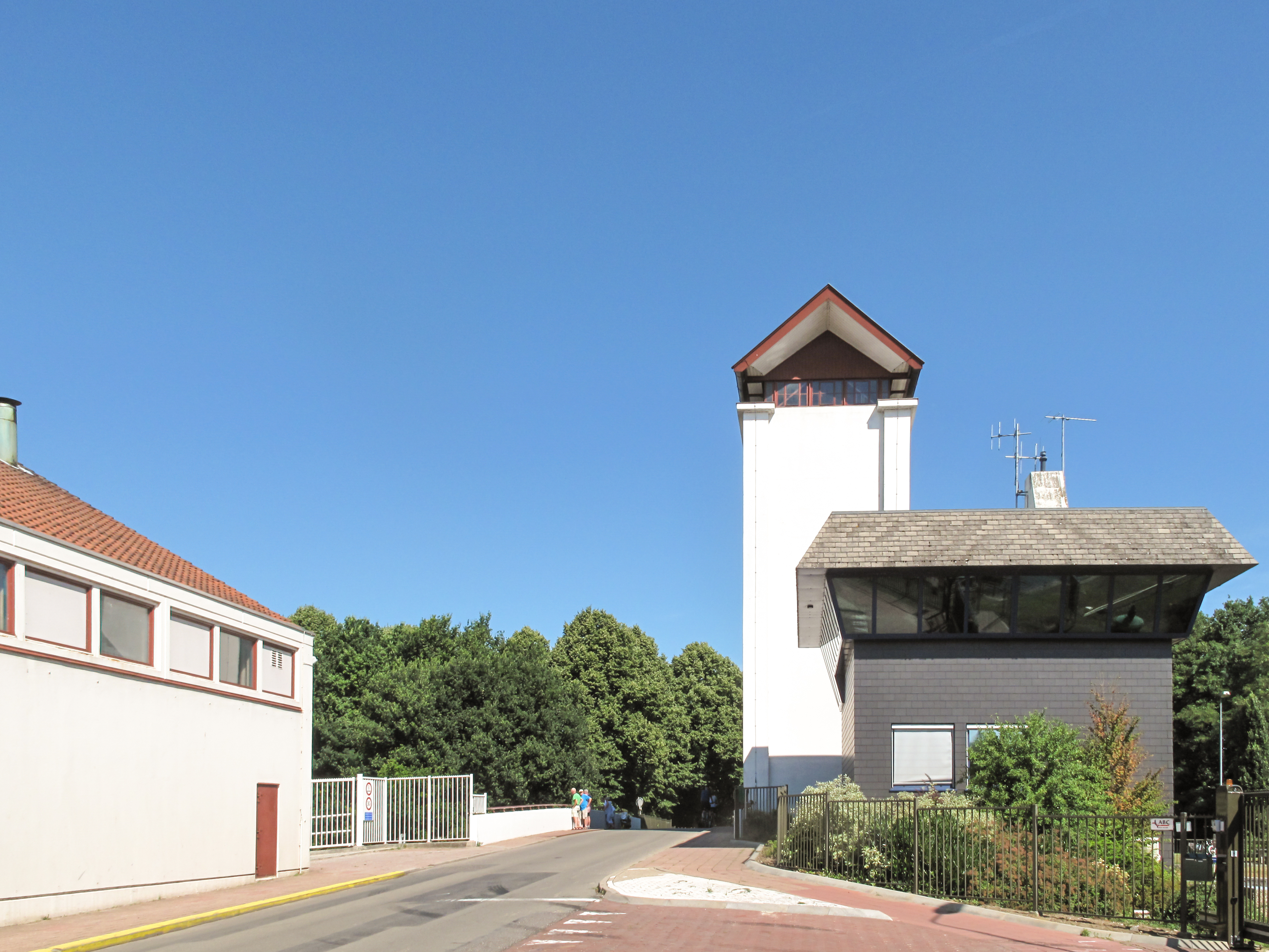
Eefde, lock photo 1

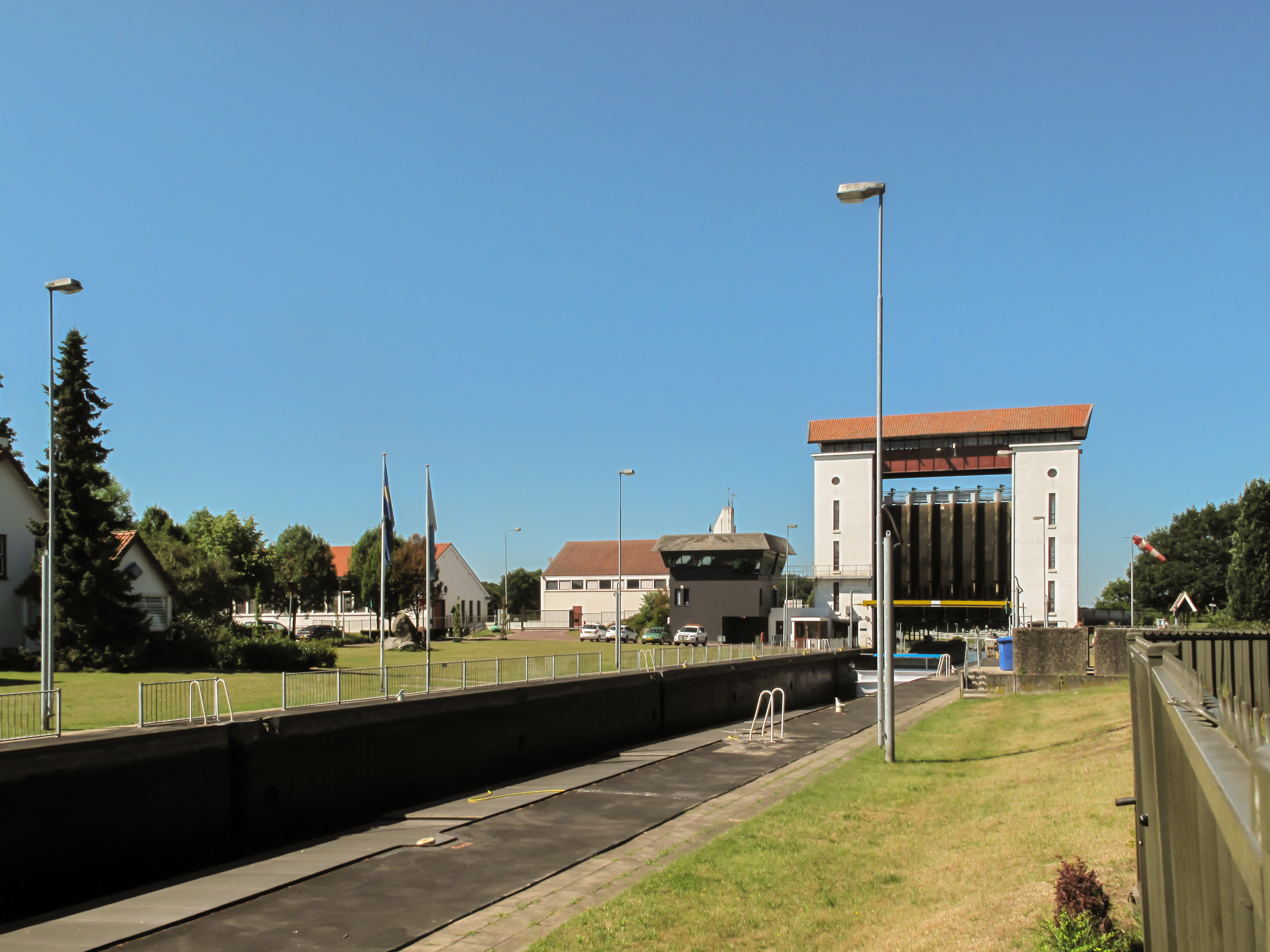
Eefde, lock photo 2
