= Tom Beissel =

Dutch footballer

Personal information
- Full name: Tom Beissel
- Date of birth: 10 May 1994 (age 32)
- Place of birth: Nijmegen, Netherlands
- Height: 1.81 m (5 ft 11 1/2 in)
- Position: Right back

Youth career
- 2001–2004: Juliana '31
- 2004–2006: SC NEC
- 2006–2014: Vitesse

Senior career*
Years	Team	Apps	(Gls)
2014–2017	Telstar	28	(0)
2017–2018	De Treffers	13	(0)
2018–2020	Blauw Geel '38		
2020–2022	OJC Rosmalen		
- * Club domestic league appearances and goals as of 4 October 2018

Tom Beissel (born 10 May 1994 in Nijmegen) is a Dutch retired footballer who played as a right back.

== Club career ==
Beissel joined Telstar in summer 2014 from the Vitesse academy but missed a large part of the 2015/16 season due to a knee injury. He signed for Blauw Geel '38 in 2018 and moved to OJC Rosmalen in 2020. A cruciate ligament injury cut short his career.
