= Fabian Serrarens =

Dutch footballer (born 1991)

Personal information
- Date of birth: 9 February 1991 (age 35)
- Place of birth: Amsterdam, Netherlands
- Height: 1.88 m (6 ft 2 in)
- Position: Forward

Team information
- Current team: DWS

Youth career
- SC Voorland
- Utrecht
- IJVV Stormvogels
- –2008: Zeeburgia
- 2008–2010: Ajax
- 2010–2011: NAC Breda

Senior career*
Years	Team	Apps	(Gls)
2011–2015	Almere City	91	(22)
2015–2017	Telstar	65	(15)
2017–2019	De Graafschap	61	(19)
2019–2020	Arka Gdynia	19	(1)
2020–2021	Roda JC	35	(7)
2022	HJK	16	(0)
2023–2025	TEC	44	(10)
2025–	DWS		
- * Club domestic league appearances and goals as of 11:27, 1 December 2025 (UTC)

Fabian Serrarens (born 9 February 1991) is a Dutch footballer who plays as a striker for Dutch amateur club DWS. He formerly played for Almere City, Telstar, De Graafschap, Arka Gdynia, Roda JC, HJK and TEC.

== Club career ==
On 6 January 2022, he signed a one-year contract with HJK in Finland.

Serrarens moved to Derde Divisie club TEC in September 2023.

== Honours ==
HJK

- Veikkausliiga: 2022
