= Liban Abdulahi =

Somali footballer (born 1995)

Personal information
- Full name: Liban Abdiaziz Abdulahi
- Date of birth: 2 November 1995 (age 31)
- Place of birth: Haarlem, Netherlands
- Height: 1.78 m (5 ft 10 in)
- Position: Midfielder

Team information
- Current team: DEM
- Number: 13

Youth career
- SV Hoofddorp
- 2009–2010: HFC Haarlem
- 2010–2011: Ajax
- 2011–2012: Zeeburgia
- 2012–2014: Groningen

Senior career*
Years	Team	Apps	(Gls)
2014–2015	Volendam	0	(0)
2015–2018	Telstar	46	(3)
2018–2019	De Graafschap	0	(0)
2019	Jönköpings Södra	3	(0)
2020	Koninklijke HFC	4	(0)
2021	Þór Akureyri	16	(1)
2022	Locomotive Tbilisi	14	(0)
2023	TEC	9	(0)
2023–2024	Olympia Haarlem		
2024–	DEM	12	(1)

International career
2019–	Somalia	7	(0)
- * Club domestic league appearances and goals as of 20:34, 18 December 2024 (UTC)

Liban Abdiaziz Abdulahi (born 2 November 1995) is a professional footballer who plays as a midfielder for RKVV DEM. Born in Netherlands, he represents the Somalia national team.

== Club career ==
Abdulahi made his professional debut in the Eerste Divisie for SC Telstar on 10 August 2015 in a game against RKC Waalwijk.

In April 2021, he signed with 1. deild karla club Þór Akureyri. In 16 league games for Þór, he scored 1 goal.

== International career ==
On 7 December 2019, Abdulahi made his debut for Somalia in a 0–0 draw against Djibouti in the 2019 CECAFA Cup.

== Personal life ==
Abdulahi is cousins with fellow Somali international Ali Abdulkadir.
