= Donny van Iperen =

Dutch footballer

Personal information
- Date of birth: 29 March 1995 (age 31)
- Place of birth: Sint Pancras, Netherlands
- Height: 1.89 m (6 ft 2 1/2 in)
- Position: Centre back

Youth career
- 2005–2010: HFC Haarlem
- 2010–2011: HVV Hollandia
- 2011–2015: AZ Alkmaar
- 2015–2016: SC Cambuur

Senior career*
| Years | Team | Apps | (Gls) |
| 2013–2015 | AZ Alkmaar II | 11 | (0) |
| 2016 | SC Cambuur II | 5 | (2) |
| 2016–2019 | SC Telstar | 78 | (2) |
| 2019–2020 | Go Ahead Eagles II | 5 | (0) |
| 2019–2020 | Go Ahead Eagles | 7 | (0) |
| 2020–2022 | Karaiskakis | 10 | (0) |
| 2022–2023 | Zimbru Chișinău | 2 | (0) |
| Total | | 118 | (4) |
- * Club domestic league appearances and goals

Donny van Iperen (born 29 March 1995) is a Dutch former professional footballer who played as a centre back.

== Club career ==
He made his professional debut in the Eerste Divisie for SC Telstar on 8 August 2016 in a game against RKC Waalwijk.

On 6 August 2022, during a game against Dinamo-Auto Tiraspol, van Iperen collided with the keeper. He fell into a coma and was transferred to the hospital in Chișinău. On 13 August, Van Iperen was brought to the Netherlands for further treatment. He was left with permanent impairments, forcing him to retire from professional football. His club at the time of the accident, Zimbru Chișinău, was later found to not have taken out insurance for van Iperen, despite being contractually obligated to do so. In November 2026, the Court of Arbitration for Sport ruled against Zimbru Chișinău, ordering the club to pay van Iperen €1 million in compensation.
