= Guyon Philips =

Dutch footballer

Personal information
- Full name: Guyon Philips
- Date of birth: 15 October 1993 (age 33)
- Place of birth: Arnhem, Netherlands
- Height: 1.93 m (6 ft 4 in)
- Position: Striker

Team information
- Current team: Víðir
- Number: 9

Youth career
- ESA Rijkerswoerd
- Vitesse Arnhem

Senior career*
Years	Team	Apps	(Gls)
2012–2013	Go Ahead Eagles	4	(0)
2013–2014	→ FC Oss (loan)	23	(10)
2014–2015	→ FC Volendam (loan)	24	(7)
2015–2016	FC Volendam	8	(1)
2016–2017	Telstar	20	(4)
2017–2018	Achilles '29	14	(4)
2018	FC Oss	4	(0)
2018	Víkingur Ó.	6	(0)
2019	Alta	22	(12)
2020–	Víðir	14	(4)
- * Club domestic league appearances and goals as of 19:13, 24 May 2021 (UTC)

Guyon Philips (born 15 October 1993, in Arnhem) is a Dutch professional footballer who currently plays as a striker for Víðir. He formerly played for Go Ahead Eagles, FC Oss, FC Volendam, Víkingur Ó., Alta.

== Career ==
In 2018, Philipps left Oss for Víkingur Ó. in Iceland.
