= Edo Knol =

Dutch footballer

Personal information
- Full name: Edo Knol
- Date of birth: 13 July 1995 (age 31)
- Place of birth: Velserbroek, Netherlands
- Position: Midfielder

Team information
- Current team: Olympia Haarlem

Youth career
- VSV
- HFC Haarlem
- –2013: HFC EDO
- 2013–2014: ADO Den Haag

Senior career*
Years	Team	Apps	(Gls)
2014–2018	Telstar	67	(2)
2018–2020	Rijnsburgse Boys	33	(4)
2020–	Olympia Haarlem		
- * Club domestic league appearances and goals as of 3 October 2021

Edo Knol (born 13 July 1995) is a Dutch footballer who plays as a midfielder for Olympia Haarlem in the Derde Klasse.

== Career ==
After failing to make his breakthrough into the ADO Den Haag first team, Knol moved to Telstar in the Eerste Divisie in 2014.

In April 2018, he signed with Rijnsburgse Boys in the Tweede Divisie and chose to focus on his studies next to his football career.

In March 2020, Knol joined Olympia Haarlem in order to gain more playing time.
