= AVV Zeeburgia =

Dutch association football club

Zeeburgia
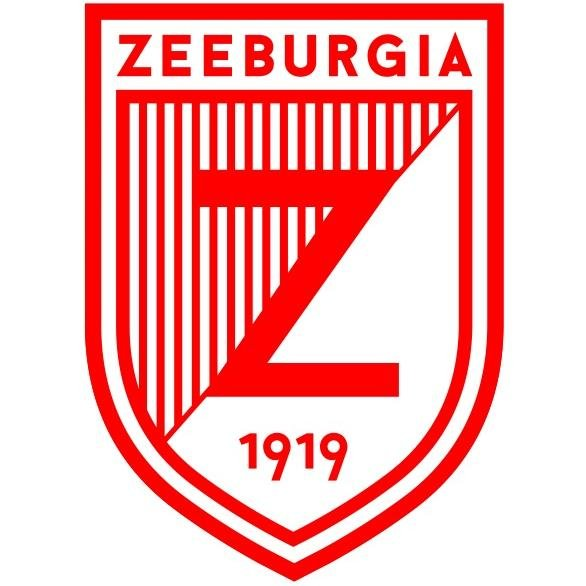
- Full name: Amsterdamse Voetbal Vereniging Zeeburgia
- Founded: 28 June 1919; 106 years ago
- Ground: Sportcomplex Middenmeer

The Amsterdamse Voetbalvereniging Zeeburgia is a football club from Amsterdam, Netherlands. It has been dubbed "royal supplier" as many Dutch professional footballers started at Zeeburgia youth teams.

== History ==
Zeeburgia was founded on 28 June 1919.

On 26 August 1956 it lost 6–1 to Ajax in the first round of the 1956–57 National Dutch Cup.

From 1980 through 1984, the male first squad played in the Hoofdklasse.

Ahead of the 2025–26 season, in the Vijfde Klasse—the tenth and lowest tier of the Dutch football league system—Zeeburgia withdrew its first team from competition. Chairman André Bonvanie stated that the decision followed a period of organisational and sporting difficulties, including the departure of the club's head coach, and added that the withdrawal was intended to allow the club to rebuild with the aim of returning at a higher competitive level in the future.

== Former players ==
Listed are Zeeburgia players who turned professional.

Liban Abdulahi Mitch Apau Oussama Assaidi Adnan Barakat Fred Benson Ouasim Bouy Nicandro Breeveld Joshua Brenet Lorenzo Burnet Donovan Deekman Malik Dijksteel Mitchell Donald Ryan Donk Dabney dos Santos Alfons Fosu-Mensah	Timothy Fosu-Mensah Ryan Gravenberch Danzell Gravenberch Raymond Gyasi Ben Haverkort Mike Helenklaken Dick Hollander Calvin Jong-A-Pin Tarik Kada Khalid Karami Sander Keller Robert Klaasen Marc Klok Oger Klos Jeffrey Kooistra	Gerard van der Lem Kevin Luckassen Adam Maher Ludcinio Marengo Kelvin Maynard Queensy Menig Stanley Menzo Damien Menzo Hans Mulder Paul Mulders Furdjel Narsingh Luciano Narsingh Paul Nortan Rene Osei Kofi Desevio Payne	Rydell Poepon Raies Roshanali Fabian Serrarens Khalid Sinouh Denzel Slager Shaquill Sno Oussama Tannane Kenny Tete Rafael Uiterloo Marko Vejinovic Nordin Wooter Marvin Zeegelaar Jamal Amofa
