= Norair Aslanyan =

Armenian footballer

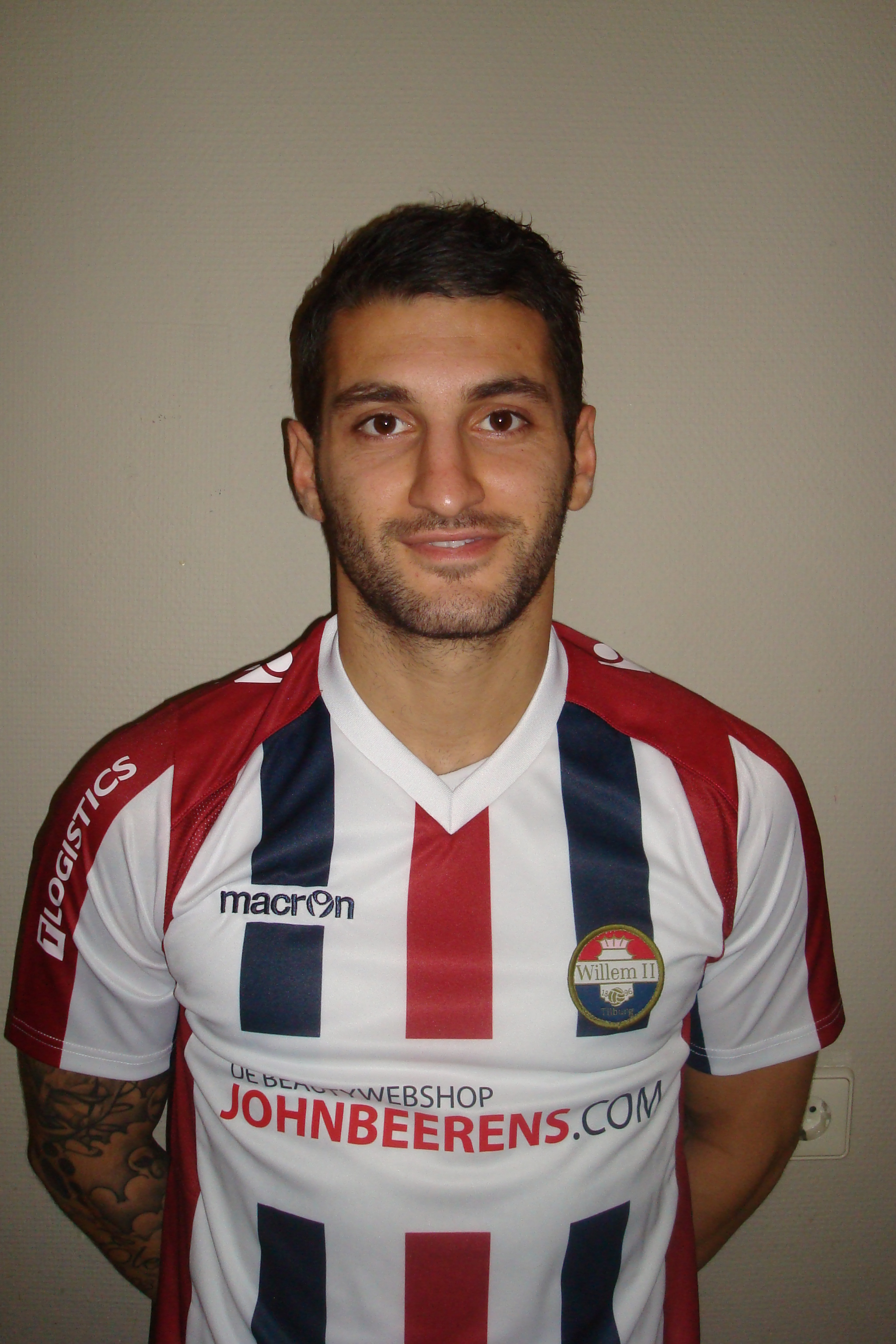
- Aslanyan with Willem II

Personal information
- Date of birth: 25 March 1991 (age 35)
- Place of birth: Karahunj, Armenian SSR
- Height: 1.75 m (5 ft 9 in)
- Position: Winger

Youth career
- 2004–2009: Groningen

Senior career*
Years	Team	Apps	(Gls)
2009–2011	Groningen	6	(0)
2009–2010	→ Veendam (loan)	0	(0)
2010	→ Cambuur (loan)	7	(0)
2011–2013	FC Zwolle	24	(5)
2012–2013	→ Emmen (loan)	27	(6)
2013–2015	Willem II	22	(2)
2014–2015	→ Almere City (loan)	35	(7)
2015–2016	Almere City	25	(4)
2016–2017	Telstar	2	(0)
2017	Alashkert	2	(0)
2018	Emmen	6	(1)
2018–2019	Katwijk	32	(6)
2019–2020	OFC Oostzaan	2	(0)

International career
2013–2015	Armenia	7	(0)
- * Club domestic league appearances and goals as of 1 July 2020

Norair Aslanyan (Armenian: Նորայր Ասլանյան; né Norair Mamedov; born 25 March 1991) is an Armenian footballer who plays as a winger. He made seven appearances for the Armenia national team between 2013 and 2015.

== Early life ==
Aslanyan was born on 25 March 1991 in the village of Karahunj in the Armenian SSR, to Armenian parents. Prior to his birth, the family had adopted the Azerbaijani surname of "Mamedov" in order to move to Europe easily and get the status of Azeri refugees during the First Nagorno-Karabakh War. The family later moved to the Netherlands. Aslanyan grew up speaking both Dutch and Armenian.

== Club career ==
Aslanyan started playing football in the Netherlands at the age of 13 with the youth team of FC Groningen. At 17, Aslanyan was part of the FC Groningen team that became the junior champions of the Netherlands; he also participated in a youth tournament held in the United States, where the team took second place.

While playing with the youth team, he was noticed by coaches from the first team. In 2009, he was loaned to SC Veendam, scoring two goals in his debut game for their youth team. In October 2010, Aslanyan was loaned to SC Cambuur. He played for the club's senior team in the Eerste Divisie, while also training with FC Groningen. As part of Cambuur, he made his senior, professional debut on 15 October 2010 in a match against RKC Waalwijk; the match ended in a 1–1 draw. Aslanyan made a total of seven league appearances during his loan spell, as well as one appearance in the KNVB Cup.

Following the end of his loan, Aslanyan made his senior debut for Groningen on 3 March 2011 in the Eredivisie league, losing 4–1 at home to Heracles Almelo. He made four further league appearances for the club. Aslanyan was loaned to FC Zwolle later in the season. At the end of the season, he moved to FC Emmen on a free transfer.

He signed for Willem II in July 2013. After one season, he was sent on loan to Almere City.

After a spell in Armenia with Alashkert, he returned to Dutch club FC Emmen in January 2018.

On 27 May 2019, it was confirmed that Aslanyan had joined OFC Oostzaan.

== International career ==
On 20 February 2012, Armenian national manager Vardan Minasyan called Aslanyan up to the Armenia national team squad for forthcoming friendly matches against Serbia and Canada. However, he was forced to withdraw from the squad due to an injury he had picked up playing club football. Aslanyan received a further call-up in May 2012.

In January 2013, he received yet another call-up for the Armenian national team. He made his national team debut against Luxembourg on 5 February 2013.

== Style of play ==
Aslanyan plays as an attacker, and is known for his speed and acceleration.

== Personal life ==
Norair is married to Anna Aslanyan. They both met at an Armenian party in the Netherlands and began dating afterwards. He changed his surname to hers before he joined the Armenian national squad. After changing his name to Norair Aslanyan, he briefly played under the name "Aslanyan-Mamedov" before a final decision on his documents was made.

Aslanyan has a number of tattoos – a drawing of some roses are depicted, and the first letters are the names of his family, written in the Armenian language, on his hands.
