= Çağrı Kodalak =

Turkish footballer (born 1991

Personal information
- Date of birth: 12 January 1991 (age 35)
- Place of birth: The Hague, Netherlands
- Height: 1.84 m (6 ft 1/2 in)
- Position: Midfielder

Youth career
- Feyenoord
- ADO Den Haag
- FC Dordrecht
- 2007–2008: Birmingham City

Senior career*
Years	Team	Apps	(Gls)
2008–2009	Göztepe	12	(3)
2009–2011	Vitesse	1	(0)
2011–2012	Sarıyer	18	(4)
2013–2014	Den Bosch	4	(0)
2014–2016	RKAVV	55	(17)
2016–2017	Telstar	4	(0)
2017	Rijnsburgse Boys	7	(0)
Total		101	(24)

International career
2006	Turkey U15	3	(0)
2007	Turkey U16	9	(4)
- * Club domestic league appearances and goals

Çağrı Kodalak (born 12 January 1991) is a former professional footballer who played as a midfielder. He represented Turkey at youth level.

== Club career ==
He made his professional debut in the Eredivisie for Vitesse on 18 April 2010 in a game against Roda JC Kerkrade.
