= Thomas van den Houten =

Dutch footballer (born 1990)

Personal information
- Date of birth: 20 July 1990 (age 36)
- Place of birth: Goes, Netherlands
- Height: 1.80 m (5 ft 11 in)
- Position: Left back

Youth career
- Kloetinge
- –2010: RBC

Senior career*
Years	Team	Apps	(Gls)
2010–2010	Olympique Charleroi	12	(0)
2011–2012	GOES		
2012–2015	Hoek	20	(1)
2015–2017	Telstar	43	(0)
2017–2019	AFC	71	(6)
2020–2021	Spakenburg	6	(1)
Total		152	(8)
- * Club domestic league appearances and goals

Thomas van den Houten (born 20 July 1990) is a Dutch retired football player who played as a left back.

== Club career ==
Van den Houten moved to Belgium as a 19-year old when he signed for Charleroi Marchienne, but returned to Zeeland after he claimed he was not paid by the club.

He made his professional debut in the Eerste Divisie for SC Telstar on 10 August 2015 in a game against RKC. He had joined the Velsen club from Hoek. He left them for AFC in 2017.

On 6 January 2020, van den Houten signed a deal with SV Spakenburg until June 2021. In March 2021, he announced his retirement from football.
