= Toine van Huizen =

Dutch footballer

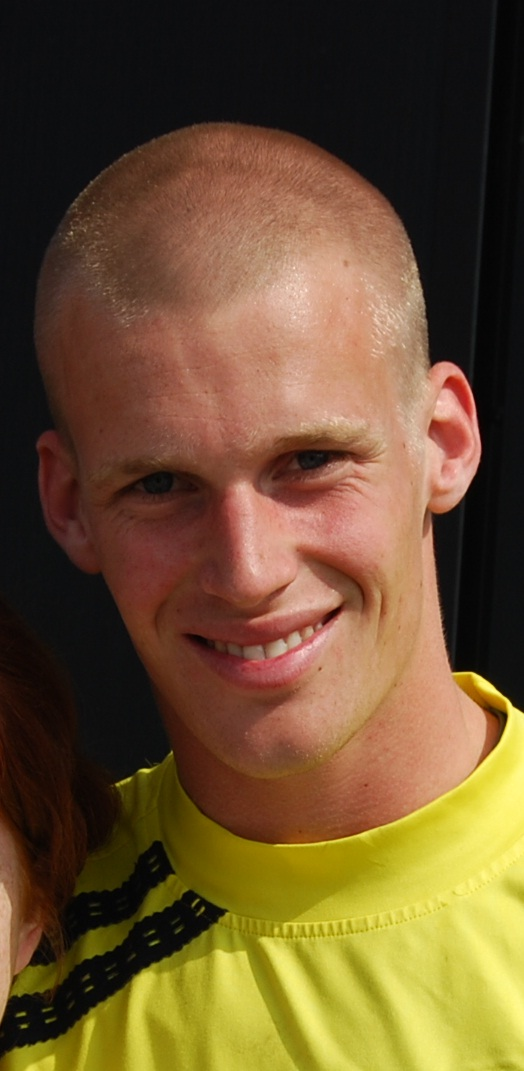
- Van Huizen in 2011

Personal information
- Full name: Toine Daniël van Huizen
- Date of birth: 13 February 1990 (age 36)
- Place of birth: Middenbeemster, Netherlands
- Height: 1.88 m (6 ft 2 in)
- Position: Centre back

Youth career
- SV Beemster
- –2007: Hellas Sport
- 2007–2010: AZ

Senior career*
Years	Team	Apps	(Gls)
2010–2011	AZ	0	(0)
2010	→ Telstar (loan)	11	(1)
2011–2013	Sparta	14	(1)
2013–2019	Telstar	147	(13)
2019–2021	De Graafschap	54	(4)
2021–2023	Dordrecht	61	(1)
Total		287	(20)
- * Club domestic league appearances and goals as of 6 August 2023

Toine Daniël van Huizen (born 13 February 1990) is a Dutch retired footballer who played as a centre-back. He formerly played for AZ, Telstar, Sparta Rotterdam, De Graafschap and Dordrecht.

== Club career ==
Van Huizen began his professional career with AZ. He was sent on loan to SC Telstar for the 2010–11 season. He returned to Alkmaar in January 2011 where he was part of the first-team squad of manager Gertjan Verbeek. Without making an appearance for AZ, he moved to Sparta Rotterdam in January 2012. In July 2019, he signed with De Graafschap after playing for six years for Telstar.

On 12 July 2021, Van Huizen signed with FC Dordrecht.
