= Crescendo van Berkel =

Dutch footballer (born 1992)

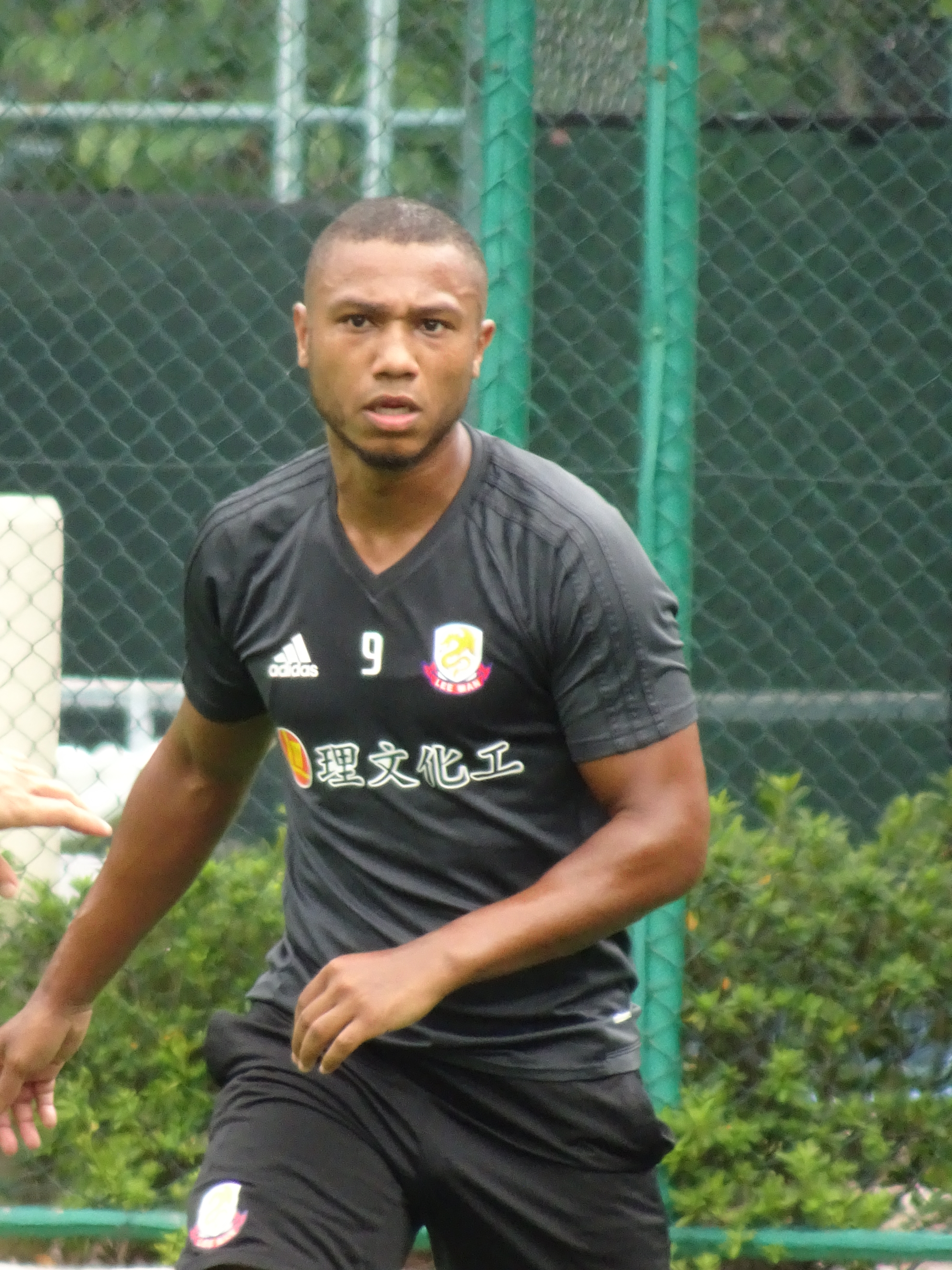

Personal information
- Date of birth: 6 April 1992 (age 34)
- Place of birth: The Hague, Netherlands
- Height: 1.83 m (6 ft 0 in)
- Position: Centre-back

Team information
- Current team: Smitshoek

Youth career
- HV & CV Quick
- 2011–2012: Sparta Rotterdam

Senior career*
Years	Team	Apps	(Gls)
2012–2014	Sparta Rotterdam	30	(1)
2014–2015	Roda JC	10	(0)
2015–2017	Telstar	49	(4)
2017–2018	Sandefjord	9	(0)
2018–2019	Lee Man	8	(0)
2020–2022	Scheveningen	19	(0)
2022–	Smitshoek		
- * Club domestic league appearances and goals

Crescendo van Berkel (born 6 April 1992) is a Dutch footballer who plays as a centre-back for Vierde Divisie club Smitshoek.

== Club career ==
Van Berkel came through the youth system at hometown club Quick and made his professional debut for Sparta Rotterdam in 2012. He was snapped up by Roda JC in 2014. He joined Telstar in summer 2015 after his contract with Roda expired.

He was signed by Norwegian club Sandefjord in Autumn 2017, and played 9 matches for the club, before being released in May 2018.

On 13 July 2018, Hong Kong club Lee Man announced the signing of van Berkel, and he made his debut on 31 August 2018. His contract is terminated in March 2019.

In February 2020, Van Berkel moved to SVV Scheveningen. In March 2022, Van Berkel was announced as Smitshoek's new signing ahead of the 2022–23 season.
