= Wesley Zonneveld =

Dutch footballer (born 1992)

Personal information
- Date of birth: 17 June 1992 (age 34)
- Place of birth: Haarlem, Netherlands
- Height: 1.95 m (6 ft 5 in)
- Position: Goalkeeper

Team information
- Current team: Rijnsburgse Boys
- Number: 1

Youth career
- –2009: Lisse
- 2009–2011: AZ

Senior career*
Years	Team	Apps	(Gls)
2011–2019	Telstar	101	(0)
2019–2020	Scheveningen	21	(0)
2020–	Rijnsburgse Boys	157	(0)
- * Club domestic league appearances and goals as of 17:01, 12 October 2026 (UTC)

Wesley Zonneveld (born 17 June 1992) is a Dutch footballer who plays as a goalkeeper for Rijnsburgse Boys in the Tweede Divisie.

== Career ==
Zonneveld played in the youth department of FC Lisse. As a seven-year-old, he was initially positioned as a goalkeeper, but later continued as an outfield player. At age 13, he returned to the goalkeeping position. Zonneveld played for Lisse for a few more years, moved to the AZ youth academy 2009. He was active in Alkmaar for two years. After his contract expired, he signed for SC Telstar, where he made his professional debut on 30 September 2011 in a match against PEC Zwolle. In this match, goalkeeper Stephan Veenboer was sent-off in the 86th minute with the score being 6–3 in favour of Zwolle. Head coach Jan Poortvliet then chose to remove striker Johan Plat from the lineup and instead let Zonneveld play as goalkeeper as a replacement for Veenboer. Due to a penalty shot by Joey van den Berg, PEC eventually won 7–3. In the 2015–16 season, he became the starting goalkeeper under head coach Michel Vonk, after an injury for regular starter Cor Varkevisser. That season, he was named "Goalkeeper Talent of the Year" of the second-tier Eerste Divisie.

In June 2019, Zonneveld moved to SVV Scheveningen from the Tweede Divisie after returning from a serious knee injury which he suffered in 2016. Halfway through the season, he signed with Rijnsburgse Boys whom he would join from the start of the 2020–21 season.
