= Fisayo Adarabioyo =

English footballer

Personal information
- Full name: Fisayo Mubarak Adarabioyo
- Date of birth: 1 February 1995 (age 31)
- Place of birth: London, England
- Position: Striker

Youth career
- –2011: Manchester City
- 2011–2013: Birmingham City

Senior career*
Years	Team	Apps	(Gls)
2014	St Johnstone	0	(0)
2014–2015	Crystal Palace	0	(0)
2015	Macclesfield Town	3	(0)
2015–2016	AFC Fylde	1	(0)
2016–2018	NAC Breda	12	(1)
2017–2018	→ FC Oss (loan)	16	(2)
2019	FC U Craiova	2	(0)
2020	Warrington Town	3	(0)
2020	Curzon Ashton	0	(0)
2020–2021	Altrincham	9	(2)
2021	Ashton United	5	(0)
Total		51	(5)
- * Club domestic league appearances and goals as of 10:25, 24 November 2021 (UTC)

Fisayo Mubarak Adarabioyo (born 1 February 1995) is an English former professional footballer who played as a striker.

== Club career ==
=== Early career ===
Adarabioyo started his career at Manchester City, before moving to Birmingham City. After his release by Birmingham in March 2013, he went on trial with Manchester United in July and August 2013, but failed to earn a contract.

He joined St Johnstone on January transfer deadline day of 2014, before signing for Crystal Palace later the same year. He did not make a senior appearance for any of these four clubs.

=== Non-league football ===
Adarabioyo made his first appearance in senior football for Macclesfield Town, coming off the bench against Aldershot Town, having signed for them on 25 September 2015. After his release by Macclesfield Town, Adarabioyo joined National League North side AFC Fylde, where he made one appearance, coming off the bench against Curzon Ashton.

=== NAC Breda ===
After a trial earlier in the summer with English club Crawley Town, on 16 August 2016, Adarabioyo signed a two-year deal with Eerste Divisie side NAC Breda. He made his debut 6 days later, on 22 August, coming on as a substitute for Manchester City loanee Brandon Barker. He scored his first goal for the club on 16 September, in the 94th minute of a 4–2 win over RKC Waalwijk. He was released by the club in 2018.

=== FC U Craiova 1948 ===
On 22 February 2019 he signed a contract with Romanian Liga III club FC U Craiova 1948. After two matches, he left the club.

=== Return to non-league ===
In February 2020, Adarabioyo joined Northern Premier League side Warrington Town, making three appearances. The following season, he featured for National League North side Curzon Ashton. After appearing once for Curzon Ashton on the bench, Adarabioyo joined National League side Altrincham. By August 2021, he was playing for Ashton United.

== Personal life ==
Fisayo is the brother of current Tottenham player Tosin Adarabioyo. In January 2023, Fisayo received a 12-month community order after being convicted of harassment without violence at Warrington Magistrates' Court.

== Career statistics ==
As of 16 November 2018

Appearances and goals by club, season and competition
Club	Season	League			Cup		Other		Total	
Club	Season	Division	Apps	Goals	Apps	Goals	Apps	Goals	Apps	Goals
Macclesfield Town	2015–16	National League	3	0	0	0	—		3	0
AFC Fylde	2015–16	National League North	1	0	0	0	—		1	0
NAC Breda	2016–17	Eerste Divisie	12	1	0	0	2 (Note: Appearance(s) in Eredivisie Promotion/relegation play-offs)	0	14	1
FC Oss	2017–18	Eerste Divisie	16	2	1	0	—		17	2
Career total			32	3	1	0	2	0	35	3
