= Floris van der Linden =

Dutch footballer (born 1996)

Personal information
- Date of birth: 10 April 1996 (age 30)
- Place of birth: Ouderkerk aan de Amstel, Netherlands
- Height: 2.00 m (6 ft 7 in)
- Position: Forward

Team information
- Current team: Spakenburg
- Number: 9

Youth career
- VV Spirit

Senior career*
Years	Team	Apps	(Gls)
2014–2016	SV Ouderkerk		
2016–2018	Telstar	23	(1)
2018–2020	Koninklijke HFC	51	(19)
2020–	Spakenburg	143	(67)
- * Club domestic league appearances and goals as of 20:59, 20 October 2025 (UTC)

Floris van der Linden (born 10 April 1996) is a Dutch footballer who plays as a forward for Tweede Divisie club Spakenburg.

== Club career ==
Van der Linden made his professional debut in the Eerste Divisie for SC Telstar on 8 August 2016 in a game against RKC Waalwijk.
