= OFC Oostzaan =

Dutch football club

OFC
- Full name: Oostzaanse Football Club
- Founded: 1 July 1932; 93 years ago
- Ground: Sportpark OFC, Oostzaan
- Chairman: Wim Poelstra
- Manager: Dave Derlagen
- League: Vierde Klasse
- 2023–24: Saturday Vierde Klasse A, 9th of 14
- Website: www.ofc-oostzaan.nl
Home colours

Oostzaanse Football Club is a football club based in Oostzaan, Netherlands, that competes in the Vierde Klasse, the ninth tier of the Dutch football league system.

== History ==
=== 20th century ===
OFC was founded on 1 July 1932. From 1939s to 2009 it played in the predominantly in the Vierde Klasse and occasionally in lower leagues. It never played above the Vierde Klasse, although it did win section championships in 1949 and 1950.

=== 21st century ===
From 2003 to 2008, OFC experienced its longest period below the Vierde Klasse, five seasons in the Vijfde Klasse. In the 2007–2008 season something shifted. In 2008 it was runner-up in the low-ranking Vijfde yet made it back to the Vierde through promotion playoffs. 2007–2008 was identical in rankings and playoff results, however, as OFC was already back its stable-state Vierde Klasse league, it promoted for the very first time to the Derde Klasse. In 2012 it won a Derde Klasse championship and made it to the Tweede Klasse, a result repeated in 2013 bringing OFC to the Eerste Klasse. From the Eerste Klasse it promoted also within a year to the Hoofdklasse, from a third position.

OFC played just two years in the Hoofdklasse, ending fourth twice. It promoted to the Sunday Derde Divisie through playoffs in 2016. The sport press was by now talking about a "football fairy tale". This fairy tale wasn't over yet, as in 2022, it promoted to the Tweede Divisie after winning a Derde Divisie championship. In June 2023, the club announced that its first team would withdraw from the football pyramid after being relegated from the Tweede Divisie in 18th place. The club stated that the past few years had been challenging for everyone involved.

Following the withdrawal of the first team, the club announced that their Saturday 1 team would become its new first team. As of the 2023–24 season, it competes in the Vierde Klasse, the ninth tier of Dutch football.

== Notable players ==
- Mohammed Ajnane (2018–2019)
- Deniz Aslan (2018–2021)
- Norair Aslanyan (2019–2020)
- Lion Axwijk (2013–2014)
- Darryl Bäly (2021–2023)
- Adnan Barakat (2016–2017)
- Arsenio Halfhuid (2014–2016)
- Pius Ikedia (2014–2016)
- Chelton Linger (2013–2015)
- Jermano Lo Fo Sang (2019–2021)
- Genridge Prijor (2021–2023)
