= Mohammed Ajnane =

Dutch professional footballer

Personal information
- Date of birth: 9 May 1990 (age 36)
- Place of birth: Alkmaar, Netherlands
- Height: 1.79 m (5 ft 10 1/2 in)
- Position: Attacking midfielder

Youth career
- Alkmaarse Boys
- AFC '34
- AZ
- FC Volendam

Senior career*
Years	Team	Apps	(Gls)
2009–2011	FC Volendam	27	(2)
2012	Eindhoven	4	(0)
2013	Zwaluwen '30		
2013–2014	FC Chabab	6	(1)
2015–2017	Telstar	47	(10)
- * Club domestic league appearances and goals as of 21 May 2017

Mohammed Ajnane (born 9 May 1990 in Alkmaar) is a Dutch professional footballer who plays as an attacking midfielder.

== Club career ==
He formerly played for FC Volendam, FC Eindhoven and FC Chabab. In summer 2015 he moved to Telstar, making his debut in August 2015 against RKC Waalwijk.
