= 2019–20 KNVB Cup =

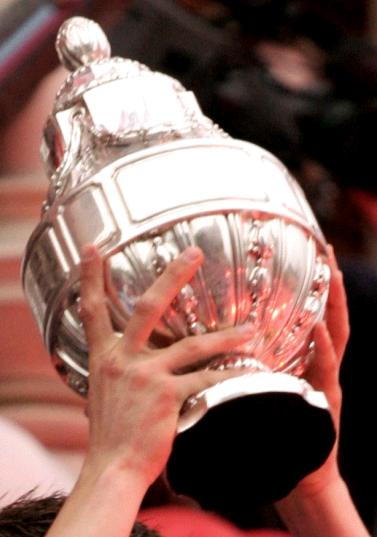
- KNVB trophy

Tournament details
- Country: Netherlands
- Venue(s): De Kuip, Rotterdam
- Teams: 64 (106 including preliminaries)

Final positions
- Champions: not awarded

Tournament statistics
- Matches played: 104
- Goals scored: 368 (3.54 per match)
- Top goal scorer(s): Maurice de Ruiter; Tim Freriks (5 goals each)

The 2019–20 KNVB Cup, for sponsoring reasons officially called the TOTO KNVB Beker, was the 102nd edition of the Dutch national football annual knockout tournament for the KNVB Cup. 64 teams contested, beginning on 17 August 2019 with the first of two preliminary rounds and was scheduled to conclude on 19 April 2020, with the final played at De Kuip in Rotterdam.

Ajax unsuccessfully defending its 2019 Cup in the semi-finals losing to FC Utrecht.

Feyenoord and Utrecht were finalists and on 24 April 2020, the KNVB Cup was abandoned due to the COVID-19 pandemic in the Netherlands. The winners were planned to participate in the 2020 Johan Cruyff Shield against the 2019–20 Eredivisie champions, but due to both the Eredivisie and the KNVB Cup being abandoned, the Johan Cruyff Shield was cancelled as well.

== Schedule ==
Round	Draw	Match Dates
First preliminary round	6 July 2019	17 and 18 August 2019
Second preliminary round	31 August 2019	24–26 September 2019
First round	31 August 2019	29–31 October 2019
Second round	2 November 2019	17–19 December 2019
Round of 16	21 December 2019	21–23 January 2020
Quarter-finals	21 December 2019	11–13 February 2020
Semi-finals	21 December 2019	3–5 March 2020
Final	21 December 2019	~~19 April 2020~~

== Matches ==
=== Preliminary rounds ===
The draw for the first preliminary round was performed by Sjaak Swart on 6 July 2019 at the Fox Sports NL & Eredivisie VoetbalFestival at the Jaarbeurs Utrecht. The draw for the second preliminary round at the same time as the draw for the first round of the main tournament at the end of August/start of September 2019

==== First preliminary round ====
58 amateur teams qualified for this stage, although 26 received a bye to the next round, leaving 32 teams to compete for a spot in the second preliminary round. The participants are semi-finalists from the district cup tournaments, and teams from the Derde Divisie.

17 August 2019	VV Hoogland (4)	1–3	Jodan Boys (5)	Hoogland
14:00 CEST	Mezbanali 27'		8', 86' Van Lunteren; 64' Borsboom	Stadium: Sportpark Langenoord; Referee: T. Hardeman

17 August 2019	VV DOVO (4)	2–4	OFC (4)	Veenendaal
14:30 CEST	Den Haag 30'; Yaşar 71'		38' (pen.), 43', 45' Freriks; 90+5' (pen.) Biberoğlu	Stadium: Sportpark Panhuis; Referee: L. Timmer

17 August 2019	VV Ter Leede (4)	1–4	Fortuna Wormerveer (6)	Sassenheim
14:30 CEST	Van Otterlo 12'; Caicedo (red card) 45'		6', 85' Plasmeijer; 45' (pen.) Snelders; 77' Van der Poll	Stadium: Sportpark Roodemolen; Referee: F. de Winter

17 August 2019	SV Huizen (6)	2–3	VV GOES (4)	Huizen
14:30 CEST	Lamme 90+2', 90+5'		18', 24', 37' Schalkwijk; (red card) 57' Meulmeester	Stadium: Sportpark De Wolfskamer; Referee: W. Bronsvoort

17 August 2019	ODIN '59 (4)	3–1	VV Gemert (4)	Heemskerk
14:30 CEST	Hulleman 18' (pen.); Dikker 27'; Willemse (red card) 65'; Brandsma 87'		43' (pen.) Van Pol	Stadium: Sportpark Assumburg; Referee: P. Henshuijs

17 August 2019	Achilles Veen (5)	6–0	USV Hercules (4)	Veen
14:30 CEST	Sebregts 10'; Aerts 13', 26', 86'; Wilborts 37'; Meerveld 61'			Stadium: Sportpark De Hanen Weide; Referee: J. Aafouallah

17 August 2019	DVS'33 Ermelo (4)	1–1 (a.e.t.) (2–3 p)	Quick H (4)	Ermelo
14:30 CEST	Roemeon 90+2'		79' Van de Water	Stadium: Sportpark Zuid; Referee: T. Winkel
	Penalties
	Öztürk (penalty scored); Bouwman (penalty scored); Oosterling (penalty missed); De Ruiter (penalty missed); Huiskamp (penalty missed)		(penalty scored) Van Hese; (penalty scored) Van der Heiden; (penalty missed) Linnenbank; (penalty missed) Bouyaouzan; (penalty scored) Asante

17 August 2019	VVOG (4)	3–0	RKSV Minor (5)	Harderwijk
14:30 CEST	Careman 11'; Latupeirissa 72'; Kersten 76' (pen.)			Stadium: Sportpark De Strokel; Referee: R. Vereijken

17 August 2019	Vroomshoopse Boys (7)	0–4	EVV (4)	Vroomshoop
14:30 CEST			45' Geenen; 68' Kindo; 70' Vankan; 90' Polman	Stadium: Sportpark De Bosrand; Attendance: 250; Referee: S. Veekamp

17 August 2019	BVV Barendrecht (4)	6–0	RKSV Wittenhorst (6)	Barendrecht
14:30 CEST	De Lange 9', 43', 66'; Bakour 52', 71'; Eekman 82'			Stadium: Sportpark De Bongerd; Referee: W. Kuijntjes

17 August 2019	VVSB (4)	2–4	Harkemase Boys (4)	Noordwijkerhout
14:30 CEST	Martins 16'; Van Niel 89'		22' Bouius; 71' Postma; 81' Bakels; 90+4' Van Duinen	Stadium: Sportpark De Boekhorst; Referee: M. Eijgelsheim

17 August 2019	FC Rijnvogels (5)	0–4	SV OSS '20 (4)	Katwijk (South Holland)
14:30 CEST			14' Van Sonsbeek; 49' De Groot; 74' Van Lith; 90' Campman	Stadium: Sportpark De Kooltuin; Referee: R. Weiland

17 August 2019	FC 's-Gravenzande (5)	2–0	RKSV Heeze (6)	's-Gravenzande
14:30 CEST	Vermolen 38'; Westhoff 85'			Stadium: Juliana Sportpark; Referee: J. te Kloeze

17 August 2019	FC Lisse (4)	1–2	Ajax (amateurs) (4)	Lisse
14:30 CEST	Köylü 24'		77' Abdulrahman; 82' Boudouni	Stadium: Ter Specke; Referee: N. Smit

17 August 2019	VEV '67 (7)	0–3	Sportclub Silvolde (5)	Leek
15:00 CEST	Veenstra (red card) 65'		55' Blasman; 63' (pen.), 75' Krosse	Stadium: Sportpark Oostindie; Attendance: 250; Referee: D. Schaper

17 August 2019	Sparta Nijkerk (4)	3–2	VV UNA (4)	Nijkerk
15:00 CEST	De Ruiter 60', 82' (pen.); Buitenhuis 69'		32', 63' Van Boekel	Stadium: Sportpark De Ebbenhorst; Attendance: 450; Referee: W. Wiersma

17 August 2019	Excelsior '31 (4)	2–1	RKVV DEM (4)	Rijssen
15:00 CEST	Diks 43'; Ezafzafi 70'		55' (pen.) Uit den Boogaard	Stadium: Sportpark De Koerbelt; Referee: B. Sahiner

17 August 2019	SDO Bussum (5)	1–0	ARC (5)	Bussum
16:00 CEST	Hemmers 10'			Stadium: Sportpark De Kuil; Referee: F. van den Elzen

17 August 2019	Rohda Raalte (6)	1–2	DUNO D. (5)	Raalte
16:00 CEST	Dikkers 37'		17' Jansen; 80' Van Essen	Stadium: Sportpark Tijenraan; Referee: M. de Bruijn

17 August 2019	RKVV Westlandia (4)	2–0	HSV De Zuidvogels (6)	Naaldwijk
17:00 CEST	Duplan 48'; Batist 90' (pen.)			Stadium: Sportpark De Hoge Bomen; Referee: R. Schul

17 August 2019	Drachtster Boys (6)	0–4 (a.e.t.)	VV Dongen (4)	Drachten
17:00 CEST			95' Saez; 103' De Man; 105' Van den Berg; 119' Tigarti	Stadium: Sportpark Drachtster Bos; Referee: V. Ris

17 August 2019	VV Kloetinge (6)	1–0	FC Lienden (4)	Kloetinge
17:00 CEST	Hubregtse 65' (pen.)			Stadium: Sportpark Wesselopark; Referee: B. Huizinga

17 August 2019	HSC '21 (4)	2–4	SteDoCo (4)	Haaksbergen
18:00 CEST	Ottink 27'; Schrijver 56'		3' Van Wanrooij; 12', 73' Verheul; 39' Doesburg	Stadium: Sportpark Groot Scholtenhagen; Referee: R. de Cock

17 August 2019	RKSV Mierlo-Hout (7)	2–3	Flevo Boys (5)	Mierlo-Hout
18:00 CEST	Van Hout 23'; Heeren 84'		7' Ramos; 52' Nijboer; 89' Strikwerda	Stadium: Sportpark De Beemd; Referee: E. Thijs

17 August 2019	RKSV Groene Ster (4)	5–0	VV Winsum (6)	Heerlerheide
18:00 CEST	Zwartjes 24'; Eind 44'; Van Kesteren 72'; Vluggen 74', 88'			Stadium: Sportpark Pronsebroek; Referee: T. Voncken

17 August 2019	SV TOP (6)	2–6	HSV Hoek (4)	Oss
18:00 CEST	Van den Broek 42' (pen.), 66' (pen.)		29' (e.d.) Wijdeven; 49', 68', 81' Franse; 56' Constansia; 28', 77' De Jager	Stadium: Sportpark TOP; Attendance: 125; Referee: L. Cairo

17 August 2019	Blauw Geel '38 (4)	2–1	VV Sliedrecht (6)	Veghel
19:00 CEST	Van Schoonhoven 67', 78'		14' Verhoef	Stadium: Sportpark Prins Willem Alexander; Referee: N. Tunnissen

28 August 2019	ADO '20 (4)	3–0	ONS Sneek (4)	Heemskerk
20:00 CEST	Mazreku 4'; Brenna 62'; Allahad 84'			Stadium: Sportpark De Vlotter; Referee: Smit

==== Second preliminary round ====
In the second preliminary round, 40 amateur teams are qualified. The participants are the 28 winners of the first preliminary round, and 12 teams from the Tweede Divisie. The matches were played on 24, 25, and 26 September 2019.

24 September 2019	Quick Boys (3)	2–3 (a.e.t.)	Katwijk (3)	Katwijk
19:45 CEST	Kuijvenhoven 71'; Van Liempt 72'	Report	58' Afaker; 61' Van Weerdenburg; 101' Van Haaren	Stadium: Sportpark Nieuw Zuid

24 September 2019	Achilles Veen (5)	1–1 (a.e.t.) (12–11 p)	HHC Hardenberg (3)	Veen
21:00 CEST	Aerts 23'	Report	62' Fatima	Stadium: Sportpark De Hanen Weide

24 September 2019	VVOG (4)	0–2	Ajax (amateurs) (4)	Harderwijk
21:00 CEST	Onuoha (red card) 68'	Report	4' Misa-Danso; 90' Boudouni	Stadium: Sportpark De Strokel

24 September 2019	GVVV (3)	2–1	Kozakken Boys (3)	Veenendaal
21:00 CEST	Ties 32' (pen.); Powel 86'	Report	69' Bolsius	Stadium: Sportpark Panhuis

24 September 2019	ASWH (3)	5–1	TEC (3)	Hendrik-Ido-Ambacht
21:00 CEST	Slotboom 33'; Van den Bosch 48'; Van de Kreeke 61', 77'; Van 't Hoog 70'	Report	24' Hoogerwerf	Stadium: Sportpark Schildman

24 September 2019	Scheveningen (3)	0–1	Harkemase Boys (4)	The Hague
21:00 CEST		Report	70' Van Duinen	Stadium: Sportpark Houtrust

24 September 2019	ODIN '59 (4)	4–3 (a.e.t.)	BVV Barendrecht (4)	Heemskerk
21:00 CEST	Halman 22'; De Vries 36' (pen.), 70'; Brandsma 115'	Report	31', 38' Krolis; 61' Vorthoren	Stadium: Sportpark Assumburg

24 September 2019	Noordwijk (3)	1–3 (a.e.t.)	Rijnsburgse Boys (3)	Noordwijk
21:00 CEST	Wendt 23'; Oversloot (red card) 112'	Report	90' (pen.), 112' (pen.), 116' (pen.) Tillema	Stadium: Sportpark Duinwetering

25 September 2019	Blauw Geel '38 (4)	0–1	De Treffers (3)	Veghel
21:00 CEST		Report	23' Misidjan	Stadium: Princ Willem Alexander Sportpark

25 September 2019	RKVV Westlandia (4)	2–2 (a.e.t.) (3–4 p)	OFC (4)	Naaldwijk
21:00 CEST	Van der Zalm 51'; Van der Sar 73'	Report	14', 65' Freriks	Stadium: Sportpark De Hoge

25 September 2019	Spakenburg (3)	2–0	SDO Bussum (5)	Spakenburg
21:00 CEST	Selimi 55'; Versteeg 90+2' (pen.)	Report	(red card) 65' Oehlers	Stadium: Sportpark De Westmaat

25 September 2019	SV OSS '20 (4)	5–1	Jodan Boys (5)	Oss
21:00 CEST	Peltzer 8'; Waterink 50'; De Groot 82', 85'; Van Lith 88'	Report	86' El Idrissi	Stadium: Sportpark De Rusheuvel

25 September 2019	RKSV Groene Ster (4)	2–0	VV Kloetinge (6)	Heerlen
21:00 CEST	Zwartjes 52'; Vluggen 60'	Report		Stadium: Sportpark Pronsenbroek

25 September 2019	VV Dongen (4)	1–2	Excelsior '31 (4)	Dongen
21:00 CEST	Saez 12'	Report	16', 90+1' Boeloerditi	Stadium: Sportpark De Biezen

25 September 2019	DUNO D. (5)	2–3	Quick H (4)	Doorwerth
21:00 CEST	Scharrenberg 27'; Grot 90+1'	Report	3', 45' Asante; 68' Tjin-Asjoe	Stadium: Sportpark De Waayenberg

25 September 2019	EVV (4)	0–0 (a.e.t.) (4–5 p)	Flevo Boys (5)	Echt-Susteren
21:00 CEST		Report		Stadium: Sportpark In de Bandert

25 September 2019	ADO '20 (4)	0–2	Fortuna Wormerveer (6)	Heemskerk
21:00 CEST		Report	31' Snelders; 67' Hoogstra	Stadium: Sportpark De Vlotter

25 September 2019	Sportclub Silvolde (5)	2–3	VV GOES (4)	Silvolde
21:00 CEST	Blasman 35'; Te Kaat 59'	Report	65' Hage; 85' Nguyen; 90+4' (pen.) Schalkwijk	Stadium: Sportpark De Munsterman

Draw made out that HSV Hoek (4), SteDoCo (4), Sparta Nijkerk (4) and FC 's-Gravenzande (5) received a bye and are qualified for the main tournament.

=== Main tournament ===
In the main tournament the following teams compete: 18 winners from the second preliminary round, 34 professional teams, four (replacement) period champions from the Tweede Divisie and the four teams that drew a bye in the second preliminary round. The four professional teams that have placed for the group stage of any European tournament get a bye in the first round.

==== First round ====
The four teams that qualified for any European tournament group stage received a bye for this round. The draw was held on 31 August 2019. The matches in the first round were played on 19, 29, 30 and 31 October 2019.

19 October 2019	FC 's-Gravenzande (5)	1–3	SteDoCo (4)	's-Gravenzande
14:30 CET	Koeleman 65' (pen.)	Report	46' Verheul; 64' Schröder; 70' Van Wanrooij	Stadium: Juliana Sportpark

29 October 2019	Vitesse (1)	2–0	De Graafschap (2)	Arnhem
18:30 CET	Darfalou 3'; Dicko 68'	Report		Stadium: GelreDome; Referee: Lindhout

29 October 2019	VV GOES (4)	0–5	SC Cambuur (2)	Goes
19:45 CET		Report	37' (pen.), 77', 80' Ladan; 54' Akoy; 68' Mac-Intosh	Stadium: Sportpark Het Schenge; Referee: Van der Laan

29 October 2019	Flevo Boys (5)	0–3	Katwijk (3)	Emmeloord
19:45 CET			18' Hilterman; 26' Esseboom; 86' Afaker	Stadium: Sportpark Ervenbos; Referee: Vos

29 October 2019	GVVV (3)	2–1	Helmond Sport (2)	Veenendaal
19:45 CET	Powel 52'; Ties 83'		70' (pen.) Swinnen	Stadium: Sportpark Panhuis; Referee: Bijl

29 October 2019	FC Dordrecht (2)	3–1	MVV (2)	Dordrecht
19:45 CET	Achahbar 21', 76', 84'		33' Goppel	Stadium: Riwal Hoogwerkers Stadion; Referee: Teuben

29 October 2019	IJsselmeervogels (3)	3–0	FC Den Bosch (2)	Spakenburg
19:45 CET	Van den Meiracker 24' (pen.); De Harder 62'; El Azzouti 70'		(red card) 23' Väisänen	Stadium: Sportpark De Westmaat; Referee: Pérez

29 October 2019	Koninklijke HFC (3)	1–2	Telstar (2)	Haarlem
19:45 CET	Tadmine 10'		22' Berenstein; 90+3' (pen.) Kharchouch	Stadium: Complex Koninklijke HFC; Referee: Dröge

29 October 2019	Hoek (4)	0–3	PEC Zwolle (1)	Hoek
19:45 CET			58', 90+2' Thy; 90+1' Johnsen	Stadium: Sportpark Denoek; Referee: Gerrets

29 October 2019	Almere City (2)	1–3	Go Ahead Eagles (2)	Almere
19:45 CET	Efmorfidis 32'		36' Beukema; 40' Van der Venne; 77' Edqvist	Stadium: Yanmar Stadion; Referee: Van den Kerkhof

29 October 2019	Achilles Veen (5)	0–2	Roda JC (2)	Veen
19:45 CET			59' Alberg; 75' Simakala	Stadium: De Heuye; Referee: Oostrom

29 October 2019	Excelsior (2)	4–2 (a.e.t.)	NEC (2)	Rotterdam
19:45 CET	Oude Kotte 51', 105'; Verhaar 88', 106'		3', 66' Musaba	Stadium: Van Donge & De Roo Stadion; Referee: Van de Graaf

29 October 2019	Rijnsburgse Boys (3)	0–4	FC Eindhoven (2)	Rijnsburg
19:45 CET			50' De Rooij; 73' Van den Eynden; 75', 76' Bourard	Stadium: Middelmors; Referee: Blank

29 October 2019	Oss '20 (4)	1–2	TOP Oss (2)	Oss
19:45 CET	Van Sonsbeek 25' (pen.)		29' Piqué; 70' Hutten	Stadium: Sportpark De Rusheuvel; Referee: Bos

29 October 2019	NAC Breda (2)	3–2	FC Emmen (1)	Breda
20:45 CET	Van Hooijdonk 31'; Riera 54'; Stokkers 74'		42' Chacon; 60' De Leeuw	Stadium: Rat Verlegh Stadion; Referee: Makkelie

30 October 2019	Heracles Almelo (1)	4–3	RKC Waalwijk (1)	Almelo
18:30 CET	Dessers 7', 55'; Van der Water 35', 70'		45' Maatsen; 53' Sow; 62' (pen.) Leemans	Stadium: Erve Asito; Referee: Bax

30 October 2019	Groene Ster (4)	2–2 (a.e.t.) (4–2 p)	VVV-Venlo (1)	Heerlerheide
19:45 CET	Vluggen 62' (pen.); Van Kesteren 84'		57' (pen.) Opoku; 90+4' Wright	Stadium: Pronsebroek; Referee: Hensgens
	Penalties
	Stassar (penalty scored); Unal (penalty scored); Ritzen (penalty scored); Knops (penalty scored)		(penalty scored) Opoku; (penalty scored) Van Ooijen; (penalty missed) Neudecker; (penalty missed) Wright

30 October 2019	Quick (4)	0–4	Willem II (1)	The Hague
19:45 CET			2', 25', 73' Trésor; 77' Gladon	Stadium: Sportpark Nieuw Hanenburg; Referee: Cantineau

30 October 2019	Excelsior Maassluis (3)	0–3	SC Heerenveen (1)	Maassluis
19:45 CET			10' Ejuke; 39' Bruijn; 84' Høegh	Stadium: Lavendelstraat; Referee: Ruperti

30 October 2019	Sparta Nijkerk (4)	5–2	Fortuna Wormerveer (6)	Nijkerk
19:45 CET	De Ruiter 17' (pen.), 53', 89'; Heus 41'; Bendadi 80'		9' Bilgin; 32' (pen.) Hoogstra; (red card) 81' Bruijn	Stadium: De Ebbenhorst; Referee: Weiland

30 October 2019	Spakenburg (3)	2–0	ASWH (3)	Spakenburg
19:45 CET	Werkman 60', 69'			Stadium: Sportpark De Westmaat; Referee: Smit

30 October 2019	Ajax (amateurs) (4)	2–2 (a.e.t.) (2–3 p)	OFC (4)	Amsterdam
19:45 CET	Misa-Danso 12'; De Jonge 53'		31', 63' El Amrani	Stadium: De Toekomst; Referee: Eijgelsheim
	Penalties
	Bormann (penalty missed); Van Roemburg (penalty scored); Fransberg (penalty missed); De Jonge (penalty scored); Boudouni (penalty missed)		(penalty missed) Biberoğlu; (penalty scored) Freriks; (penalty scored) Amarzagouio; (penalty missed) Boerlage; (penalty scored) Ottenhoff

30 October 2019	AFC (3)	3–3 (a.e.t.) (2–4 p)	ODIN '59 (4)	Amsterdam
19:45 CET	Y. Teijsse 28', 29'; K. Teijsse 90+2'		5' De Vries; 70' Willemse; 84' Brandsma	Stadium: Goed Genoeg; Referee: Rozendal
	Penalties
	Ascencion (penalty scored); Hoek (penalty scored); Markiet (penalty missed); K. Teijsse (penalty missed)		(penalty scored) Boekel; (penalty scored) Hulleman; (penalty scored) Jager; (penalty scored) De Vries

30 October 2019	Harkemase Boys (4)	1–2	FC Groningen (1)	Harkema
19:45 CET	Stelpstra 49'		36' (pen.), 47' Memišević	Stadium: De Bosk; Referee: Van der Eijk

30 October 2019	De Treffers (3)	0–2	FC Twente (1)	Groesbeek
19:45 CET			16', 22' Nakamura	Stadium: Sportpark Zuid; Referee: Kooij

30 October 2019	Sparta Rotterdam (1)	1–0	FC Volendam (2)	Rotterdam
20:45 CET	Veldwijk 21'			Stadium: Het Kasteel; Referee: Kamphuis

31 October 2019	Excelsior '31 (4)	1–4	FC Utrecht (1)	Rijssen
18:30 CET	Penterman 77'		9' Guwara; 41' (pen.) Maher; 72' Issah; 90' Makienok	Stadium: Sportpark De Koerbelt; Referee: Martens

31 October 2019	Fortuna Sittard (1)	3–0	ADO Den Haag (1)	Sittard
20:45 CET	Diemers 59' (pen.); Damașcan 61'; Zeka 76'			Stadium: Fortuna Sittard Stadion; Referee: Mulder

==== Second round ====
The matches of the second round took place between 17 and 19 December 2019. Ajax, PSV, Feyenoord and AZ entered in this round as they skipped the first round due to qualifying for the group stages of the Champions League or the Europa League.

17 December 2019	FC Twente (1)	2–5	Go Ahead Eagles (2)	Enschede
18:30 CET	Aitor 31' (pen.); Bijen 47'	Report	8', 85' Rabillard; 14' (pen.) Veldmate; 69' Berden; 77' Van der Venne	Stadium: De Grolsch Veste; Referee: Manschot

17 December 2019	sc Heerenveen (1)	2–0	Roda JC (2)	Heerenveen
19:45 CET	Van Bergen 44'; Veerman 55'	Report		Stadium: Abe Lenstra Stadion; Referee: Blom

17 December 2019	Katwijk (3)	0–0 (a.e.t.) (3–4 p)	TOP Oss (2)	Katwijk
19:45 CET		Report		Stadium: Sportpark De Krom; Referee: Gansner
	Penalties
	Mengerink (penalty scored); Van der Meer (penalty scored); Hitlerman (penalty scored); Bergkamp (penalty missed); Susan (penalty missed)		(penalty scored) Hutten; (penalty scored) Kaak; (penalty scored) Asmelash; (penalty scored) O. Rommens; (penalty missed) P. Rommens

17 December 2019	IJsselmeervogels (3)	1–0	SteDoCo (4)	Spakenburg
19:45 CET	Van Riel 39'	Report		Stadium: Sportpark De Westmaat; Referee: Bos

17 December 2019	Excelsior (2)	0–2	FC Eindhoven (2)	Rotterdam
19:45 CET	Fischer (red card) 62'	Report	64' Van der Sande; 88' Bourard	Stadium: Van Donge & De Roo Stadion; Referee: Bijl

17 December 2019	Vitesse (1)	4–0	ODIN '59 (4)	Arnhem
19:45 CET	Buitink 24'; Darfalou 28'; Vroeg 30'; Hájek 42'	Report		Stadium: GelreDome; Referee: Ruperti

17 December 2019	Fortuna Sittard (1)	3–0	PEC Zwolle (1)	Sittard
20:45 CET	Sambou 17'; Karjalainen 43'; Lachman 71' (o.g.)	Report		Stadium: Fortuna Sittard Stadion; Referee: Bax

18 December 2019	Telstar (2)	3–4	Ajax (1)	Velsen-Zuid
18:30 CET	Korpershoek 44'; Benamar 60'; Kharchouch 88'	Report	25' Lang; 28', 57' Dest; 48' Ekkelenkamp	Stadium: Rabobank IJmond Stadion; Referee: Kooij

18 December 2019	Sparta Nijkerk (4)	0–1 (a.e.t.)	NAC Breda (2)	Nijkerk
19:45 CET		Report	94' Dogan	Stadium: De Ebbenhorst; Referee: Van der Laan

18 December 2019	AZ Alkmaar (1)	3–0	Groene Ster (4)	Alkmaar
19:45 CET	Clasie (red card) 55'; Druijf 60'; Svensson 62'; De Wit 67'	Report		Stadium: AFAS Stadion; Referee: Van der Eijk

18 December 2019	OFC (4)	0–0 (a.e.t.) (4-5 p)	Spakenburg (3)	Oostzaan
19:45 CET		Report		Stadium: Sportpark OFC; Referee: Dröge
	Penalties
	Freriks (penalty scored); Amarzagouio (penalty missed); Lo Fo Sang (penalty scored); El Amrani (penalty scored); Biberoğlu (penalty scored)		(penalty scored) Castien; (penalty scored) Will; (penalty scored) Werkman; (penalty scored) Versteeg; (penalty scored) Beijer

18 December 2019	Willem II (1)	3–0	Sparta Rotterdam (1)	Tilburg
19:45 CET	Pavlidis 19'; Trésor 24'; Nunnely 31'	Report		Stadium: Koning Willem II Stadion; Referee: Oostrom

18 December 2019	Heracles Almelo (1)	3–0	FC Dordrecht (2)	Almelo
19:45 CET	Dessers 17'; Van der Water 50'; Breukers 86'	Report		Stadium: Erve Asito; Referee: Gerrets

18 December 2019	GVVV (3)	1–2 (a.e.t.)	PSV (1)	Veenendaal
20:45 CET	Laghmouchi 84'	Report	41' Mitroglou; 117' Ihattaren	Stadium: Sportpark Panhuis; Referee: Blank

19 December 2019	FC Groningen (1)	0–1	FC Utrecht (1)	Groningen
18:30 CET		Report	68' Issah	Stadium: Euroborg; Referee: Van Boekel

19 December 2019	SC Cambuur (2)	1–2	Feyenoord (1)	Leeuwarden
20:45 CET	Maulun 75' (pen.)	Report	67' Berghuis; 87' (o.g.) Schmidt	Stadium: Cambuur Stadion; Referee: Higler

==== Round of 16 ====
The matches of the round of 16 took place between 21 and 23 January 2020.

21 January 2020	TOP Oss (2)	0–2	AZ Alkmaar (1)	Oss
18:30 CET		Report	37' De Wit; 54' (pen.) Koopmeiners	Stadium: Frans Heesen Stadion; Referee: L. Gerrets

21 January 2020	FC Eindhoven (2)	1–2 (a.e.t.)	FC Utrecht (1)	Eindhoven
20:45 CET	Bourard 37'	Report	61' Issah; 112' Bahebeck	Stadium: Jan Louwers Stadion; Referee: M. Pérez

22 January 2020	Heracles Almelo (1)	0–2	Vitesse (1)	Almelo
18:30 CET		Report	11' Tannane; 60' Matavž	Stadium: Polman Stadion; Referee: J. Kamphuis

22 January 2020	Ajax (1)	7–0	Spakenburg (3)	Amsterdam
20:45 CET	De Jong 18', 42', 44'; Traoré 49', 52'; Tadić 55'; Ünüvar 86' (pen.)	Report		Stadium: Johan Cruyff Arena; Referee: R. Martens

22 January 2020	sc Heerenveen (1)	2–2 (a.e.t.) (4–3 p)	Willem II (1)	Heerenveen
20:45 CET	Faik 48' (pen.); Dries Saddiki 76' (o.g.)	Report	20' Pavlidis; 81' Dankerlui	Stadium: Abe Lenstra Stadion; Referee: P. van Boekel
	Penalties
	Faik (penalty scored); Drešević (penalty scored); Espejord (penalty missed); Halilović (penalty scored); Ejuke (penalty scored)		(penalty missed) Heerkens; (penalty scored) Trésor; (penalty scored) Nelom; (penalty missed) Vrousai; (penalty scored) Holmén

23 January 2020	IJsselmeervogels (3)	1–1 (a.e.t.) (6–7 p)	Go Ahead Eagles (2)	Spakenburg
18:30 CET	Olijfveld 50'	Report	79' Bosz	Stadium: Sportpark De Westmaat; Referee: C. Bax
	Penalties
	El Azzouti (penalty scored); Van Riel (penalty scored); Buitenhuis (penalty scored); Brummel (penalty scored); De Harder (penalty missed); Justiana (penalty missed); Van Diermen (penalty scored); Akla (penalty scored); Van Leijenhorst (penalty missed)		(penalty scored) Bosz; (penalty scored) Bannink; (penalty missed) Corboz; (penalty scored) Mertens; (penalty scored) brito; (penalty missed) Pouwels; (penalty scored) Eddahchouri; (penalty scored) Edqvist; (penalty scored) Verhulst

23 January 2020	NAC Breda (2)	2–0	PSV (1)	Breda
20:45 CET	Boussaid 54'; I. Ilić 73'	Report		Stadium: Rat Verlegh Stadion; Referee: S. Gözübüyük

21 January 2020	Fortuna Sittard (1)	1–2 (a.e.t.)	Feyenoord (1)	Sittard
20:45 CET	Passlack 49'	Report	43' (o.g.) Ciss; 120' Narsingh	Stadium: Fortuna Sittard Stadion; Referee: K. Blom
Note: The match was suspended in the 63rd minute due to bad weather; the remainder of the match was played on 28 January 2020.

==== Quarter-finals ====
The matches of the quarter-finals took place between 11 and 13 February 2020. From this round on the referees were assisted by video assistant referee.

12 February 2020	AZ Alkmaar (1)	1–3	NAC Breda (2)	Alkmaar
18:30 CET	Idrissi 65'	Report	35' El Allouchi; 60' Schouten; 86' Noblejas	Stadium: AFAS Stadion; Attendance: 7,511; Referee: P. van Boekel

12 February 2020	Vitesse (1)	0–3	Ajax (1)	Arnhem
20:45 CET		Report	32' Babel; 76' Gravenberch; 85' (pen.) Tadić	Stadium: GelreDome; Attendance: 18,389; Referee: B. Nijhuis

13 February 2020	Go Ahead Eagles (2)	1–4	FC Utrecht (1)	Deventer
18:30 CET	Navrátil 49'	Report	37' Gustafson; 45+2' Maher; 55' Bahebeck; 74' Peterson	Stadium: De Adelaarshorst; Attendance: 8,064; Referee: D. Makkelie

13 February 2020	sc Heerenveen (1)	0–1	Feyenoord (1)	Heerenveen
20:45 CET		Report	15' Fer	Stadium: Abe Lenstra Stadion; Attendance: 16,500; Referee: D. Higler

==== Semi-finals ====
The semi-finals took place on 4 and 5 March 2020.

4 March 2020	FC Utrecht (1)	2–0	Ajax (1)	Utrecht
20:45 CET	Van de Streek 33'; Gustafson 65' (pen.)	Report		Stadium: Stadion Galgenwaard; Attendance: 22,601; Referee: B. Kuipers

5 March 2020	Feyenoord (1)	7–1	NAC Breda (2)	Rotterdam
20:45 CET	Senesi 15'; Berghuis 20' (pen.), 45', 52' (pen.); Boženík 23'; Haps 31'; Narsingh 88' (pen.)	Report	47' Van Hecke	Stadium: De Kuip; Attendance: 45,000; Referee: J. Kamphuis

==== Final ====
19 April 2020
18:00 CEST

FC Utrecht	Cancelled	Feyenoord
	Report

De Kuip, Rotterdam
