= 2013–14 KNVB Cup =

Tournament details
- Country: Netherlands
- Teams: 82

Final positions
- Champions: PEC Zwolle (1st title)
- Runners-up: Ajax

Tournament statistics
- Matches played: 81
- Goals scored: 285 (3.52 per match)
- Attendance: 467,167 (5,767 per match)
- Top goal scorer(s): Aron Jóhannsson (6 goals)

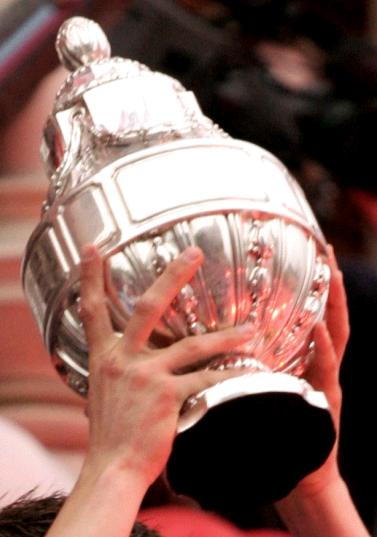
The KNVB Cup trophy.

The 2013–14 KNVB Cup tournament was the 96th edition of the Dutch national football knockout tournament for the KNVB Cup. 82 teams contested in 81 matches beginning on 28 August 2013 in the first round and concluded with the final on 20 April 2014.

AZ unsuccessfully defended its 2012 title. PEC Zwolle successfully pursued the 2013–14 KNVB Cup and qualified for the play-off round of the 2014–15 UEFA Europa League. Ajax were runner-up.

== Participants ==
82 teams participate in the 2013-14 cup. The 18 clubs of the Eredivisie and the 17 clubs of the Eerste divisie (excluding reserve teams) qualified automatically, entering in the second round. Other teams qualify by finishing in the top 12 of the Topklasse or by reaching the semi-finals in a local KNVB Cup, called 'districtsbeker', for clubs from level 3 onwards, in the previous season.

Division	Clubs			
Eredivisie (1)	ADO Den Haag	Go Ahead Eagles	NEC	Roda JC Kerkrade
Eredivisie (1)	Ajax	FC Groningen	PEC Zwolle	FC Twente
Eredivisie (1)	AZ	SC Heerenveen	PSV	FC Utrecht
Eredivisie (1)	SC Cambuur	Heracles Almelo	RKC Waalwijk	Vitesse Arnhem
Eredivisie (1)	Feyenoord	NAC Breda		
Eerste Divisie (2)	Achilles '29	FC Emmen	Helmond Sport	Telstar
Eerste Divisie (2)	Almere City FC	Excelsior	MVV Maastricht	VVV-Venlo
Eerste Divisie (2)	FC Den Bosch	Fortuna Sittard	FC Oss	FC Volendam
Eerste Divisie (2)	FC Dordrecht	De Graafschap	Sparta Rotterdam	Willem II
Eerste Divisie (2)	FC Eindhoven			
Topklasse (3)	HHC Hardenberg	EVV	HSC'21	vv Noordwijk
Topklasse (3)	ADO '20	Excelsior '31	IJsselmeervogels	Rijnsburgse Boys
Topklasse (3)	AFC	Be Quick 1887	FC Lisse	SVV Scheveningen
Topklasse (3)	BVV Barendrecht	GVVV	JVC Cuijk	WKE
Topklasse (3)	vv Capelle	Ter Leede	vv Katwijk	FC Lienden
Topklasse (3)	FC Chabab	HBS	Kozakken Boys	De Treffers
Topklasse (3)	VVSB			
Hoofdklasse (4)	SC Genemuiden	ASWH	EHC/Heuts	VV De Zouaven
Hoofdklasse (4)	HVV Hollandia	Harkemase Boys	VV Smitshoek	SV Deurne
Hoofdklasse (4)	DVS '33	HSV Hoek	RVVH	VV Sneek Wit Zwart
Hoofdklasse (4)	OJC Rosmalen	Rohda Raalte		
Eerste Klasse (5)	SHO	SVL	JOS Watergraafsmeer	
Tweede Klasse (6)	Wilhelmina '08	SV DFS	OWIOS	TEC
Vierde Klasse (8)	RKSV Volkel			

== Calendar ==
The calendar for the 2013–14 KNVB Cup is as follows.

Rounds	Date
First round	28 August 2013
Second round	24, 25 or 26 September 2013
Third round	29, 30 or 31 October 2013
Fourth round	17, 18 or 19 December 2013
Quarter-finals	21, 22 or 23 January 2014
Semi-finals	25, 26 or 27 March 2014
Final	20 April 2014

== First round ==
36 amateur clubs competed in this stage of the competition for a place in the second round. These matches took place on 28 August 2013. 11 amateur teams received a bye.

28 August 2013
18:00

De Zouaven	2-0	Ter Leede
Olaf Schell (o.g.) 54'; Arjan Boekweit 65'

De Kloet, Grootebroek
Attendance: 250
Referee: Gino D'Onorio
28 August 2013
18:00

DFS	2-7	SWZ/Boso Sneek
Dusty Louwaars 27'; Dusty Louwaars 49'		4' Harm Jan Stuiver; 22' Age Hains Boersma; 37' Age Hains Boersma; 44' Freek de Jong; 47' Erolind Derguti; 58' Tjeerd Andries Andringa; 85' Tjeerd Andries Andringa

't Heerenland, Opheusden
Attendance: 100
Referee: Peter van Beelen
28 August 2013
18:00

Scheveningen	2-1	VVSB
Marvin Nieuwlaat (pen) 73'; Nick Brouwer 85'		58' Koen Bosma; (red card) 90' Jordy Zwart

Houtrust, Scheveningen
Attendance: 250
Referee: Maarten Dubbeld
28 August 2013
18:00

Capelle	4-1	FC Chabab
Peter de Lange 34'; Peter de Lange 46'; Marvin Strik 72'; Emiel Buntsma 90'		78' Melvin Grootfaam; (yellow card) 79' (yellow-red card) 86' Mohammed Moudou

't Slot, Capelle
Attendance: 500
Referee: Martin Perez
28 August 2013
18:00

OWIOS	1 - 5	EVV
Patrick Mensink 90'		24' Jeroen Eveleins; 38' Jeroen Eveleins; 81' Chefrino Eind; 83' (pen) Jeroen Eveleins; 86' Chefrino Eind

Bovenmolen, Oldebroek
Attendance: 400
Referee: Derya Serik
28 August 2013
19:00

Noordwijk	1 - 0	WKE
Mohammed Faouzi 90'

Duinwetering, Noordwijk
Attendance: 250
Referee: Bob Grilis
28 August 2013
19:00

Volkel	0 - 3	Rijnsburgse Boys
		25' Raily Ignacio; 46' Martin van Eeuwijk; 68' Martin van Eeuwijk

Volkel, Volkel
Attendance: 700
Referee: Lorenzo Cairo
28 August 2013
19:30

FC Lisse	2 - 2 (a.e.t.)	TEC VV
Renaldo Jongebloet 17'; Mark van Marrewijk 120'		56' Ibrahim Aliskan; 117' Sven van Ingen

Ter Specke, Lisse
Attendance: 250
Referee: Erwin Blank
28 August 2013
20:00

RVVH	2 - 1	JOS Watergraafsmeer
Jesse Eggers 51'; Micha Moerenhout 68'		12' Richmond Bossman

Reyerpark, Ridderkerk
Attendance: 800
Referee: Paul van der Burg
28 August 2013
20:00

OJC Rosmalen	1 - 3 (a.e.t.)	Hoek
Thijs van der Velden 44'; Guus Habraken (yellow card) 71' (yellow-red card) 108'		88' (pen) Thomas van den Houten; 95' Yves Nyemb; 119' Guillaume Clinckemaillie

De Groote Wielen, Rosmalen
Attendance: 300
Referee: Bas van Dongen
28 August 2013
20:00

SVL	2 - 3 (a.e.t.)	EHC/Heuts
Joran Hofman 10'; Danny Kuijer 22'		5' Olaf Rompelberg; 29' Jemayel Maruanaja; 107' Peter-Jan Erkens

Oranjehof, Langbroek
Attendance: 600
Referee: Wim Bronsvoort
28 August 2013
20:00

SHO	1 - 2	AFC
Giovanni Klaverweide 53'		34' Tim Wulffraat; 79' Enrico Patrick

Kikkershoek, Oud-Beijerland
Attendance: 350
Referee: Louis Duarte
28 August 2013
20:00

Harkemase Boys	4 - 1	Rohda Raalte
Robin Huisman de Jong (pen) 54'; Jordi Lemmens (o.g.) 57'; Heine Uuldriks 90'; Heine Uuldriks 90'		63' Jasper Broekhuis

De Bosk, Harkema
Attendance: 800
Referee: Alwin Steeg
28 August 2013
20:00

HHC Hardenberg	1 - 2	JVC Cuijk
Tiemen van Hezel 90'		19' Fathi Ben-Ahmed; 71' Fathi Ben-Ahmed

De Boshoek, Hardenberg
Attendance: 900
Referee: Peter van Turenhout
28 August 2013
20:00

DVS '33	4 - 1	Hollandia
Ali Akla 9'; Frank Smeding 31'; Ali Akla 59'; Henk Baum (pen) 63'		20' Kalvin Robert; (red card) 62' Nick de Wit

DVS'33, Ermelo
Attendance: 500
Referee: Stijn Berben
28 August 2013
20:00

IJsselmeervogels	3 - 0	FC Lienden
Arnoud van Toor 37'; Nabil El Gourari 38'; Selmo Kurbegović 46'

De Westmaat, Spakenburg
Attendance: 850
Referee: Edwin Boot
28 August 2013
20:00

SC Genemuiden	0 - 1 (a.e.t.)	Deurne
		93' Harm van der Steen; (yellow card) 90' (yellow-red card) 100' Alain van de Besselaar

De Wetering, Genemuiden
Attendance: 500
Referee: Johan Bezemer
28 August 2013
20:00

Kozakken Boys	2 - 1	Be Quick 1887
Gwaeron Stout 25'; Quentin Jakoba 70'		23' Rob van der Leij

De Zwaaier, Werkendam
Attendance: 700
Referee: Menno Hof

== Second round ==
The 18 winners from the first round entered in this stage of the competition along with the 17 Eerste Divisie clubs, the 18 Eredivisie clubs and the 11 amateur club, that received a bye. These matches took place from 24 to 26 September 2013.

24 September 2013
17:00

Capelle	1-0 (a.e.t.)	Almere City FC
Marvin Strik 118'

't Slot, Capelle
Attendance: 600
Referee: Edwin Boot
24 September 2013
18:45

Harkemase Boys	0-8	N.E.C.
		19' Christoph Hemlein; 36' Christoph Hemlein; 37' Jakob Jantscher; 58' Christoph Hemlein; 61' Navarone Foor; 69' Samuel Štefánik; 76' Alireza Jahanbakhsh; 88' Jakob Jantscher

De Bosk, Harkema
Attendance: 2,000
Referee: Siemen Mulder
24 September 2013
19:00

TEC VV	1-3	MVV Maastricht
Sven van Ingen (yellow card) 20' (yellow-red card) 40'; Nehemia Sanaky 68'		38' (pen) Gianluca Maria; 43' Gianluca Maria; 45' Sven Braken

De Lok, Tiel
Attendance: 1,000
Referee: Ingmar Oostrom
24 September 2013
19:30

Katwijk	1-6	SC Cambuur
Joost Leonard 55'		18' Kevin Brands; 25' Paco van Moorsel; 29' Martijn Barto; 40' Marcel Ritzmaier; 42' Ramon Leeuwin; 68' Marlon Pereira Freire

De Krom, Katwijk
Attendance: 800
Referee: Edwin van de Graaf
24 September 2013
20:00

DVS '33	0-3	Go Ahead Eagles
		8' Erik Falkenburg; 37' Doke Schmidt; (red card) 39' Joeri Schroyen; 86' Jop van der Linden

DVS'33, Ermelo
Attendance: 1,500
Referee: Karel van den Heuvel
24 September 2013
20:00

IJsselmeervogels	3-2 (a.e.t.)	Helmond Sport
Nick Kuipers 88'; Mark Rutgers 90'; Thomas Verheydt 111'		11' Dave Nieskens; 43' Dave Nieskens

De Westmaat, Spakenburg
Attendance: 2,100
Referee: Richard Liesveld
24 September 2013
20:00

De Graafschap	1-3	Excelsior
Anco Jansen 12'		7' (pen) Lars Hutten; 19' Daan Blij; 90' Kevin Vermeulen

De Vijverberg, Doetinchem
Attendance: 2,305
Referee: Danny Makkelie
24 September 2013
20:00

Excelsior '31	2-1 (a.e.t.)	Willem II
John Lubbers 77'; Hakim Ezafzafi 108'		39' Ruud Boymans

De Koerbelt, Rijssen
Attendance: 1,750
Referee: Merlijn Gerritsen
24 September 2013
20:00

FC Oss	1-2	VVV-Venlo
Marko Maletić 81'		41' Prince Rajcomar; 89' Jules Reimerink

Frans Heesenstadion, Oss
Attendance: 711
Referee: Rogier Honig
24 September 2013
20:00

GVVV	0-3	ADO Den Haag
Koen Oost (yellow card) 32' (yellow-red card) 81'		62' Vito Wormgoor; 79' Mathias Gehrt; 83' Mike van Duinen

Panhuis, Veenendaal
Attendance: 2,250
Referee: Richard Martens
24 September 2013
20:00

Deurne	0-2	FC Emmen
Maarten Vos (red card) 66'		37' Sander Rozema; 85' Wout Weghorst

De Kranenmortel, Deurne
Attendance: 600
Referee: Stijn Berben
24 September 2013
20:00

EHC/Heuts	1-4	FC Eindhoven
Karim Mahmoud 48'		29' Jens van Son; 41' Fries Deschilder; 50' Jasper Waalkens; 52' Donny de Groot

De Dem, Hoensbroek
Attendance: 800
Referee: Davy Otto
24 September 2013
20:00

Barendrecht	0-2	JVC Cuijk
Ivan Almeida (red card) 72'		3' Frenk Schaap; 90' Alexander Prent

De Bongerd, Barendrecht
Attendance: 500
Referee: Peter van Turenhout
24 September 2013
20:00

Achilles '29	5-1	HSC '21
Freek Thoone 13'; Twan Smits 32'; Levi Raja Boean 67'; Mart Stokkers (o.g.) 86'; Daniël van Straaten 89'		76' Stef Ottink

De Heikant, Groesbeek
Attendance: 450
Referee: Jeroen Manschot
24 September 2013
20:00

Kozakken Boys	3-0	Scheveningen
Ismael Yildirim 20'; Richie Basoski 69'; Sjoerd van der Waal 80'

De Zwaaier, Werkendam
Attendance: 900
Referee: Laurens Gerrets
24 September 2013
20:45

RKC Waalwijk	0-1 (a.e.t.)	Heracles Almelo
		116' Thomas Bruns

Mandemakers Stadion, Waalwijk
Attendance: 2,178
Referee: Kevin Blom
25 September 2013
17:00

Smitshoek	1-2	NAC Breda
Tom den Boer 45'		48' Mats Seuntjens; 63' Elson Hooi

Sportpark Smitshoek, Barendrecht
Attendance: 2,000
Referee: Christiaan Bax
25 September 2013
17:00

Rijnsburgse Boys	1-2	Roda JC Kerkrade
Martin van Eeuwijk 20'		27' Frank Demouge; 34' Frank Demouge; (red card) 37' Henk Dijkhuizen

Middelmors, Rijnsburg
Attendance: 1,000
Referee: Martin van den Kerkhof
25 September 2013
17:00

AFC	0-2	FC Groningen
		27' Filip Kostić; 60' Género Zeefuik

Goed Genoeg, Amsterdam
Attendance: 1,250
Referee: Tom van Sichem
25 September 2013
17:00

RVVH	1-3	Vitesse
Jesse Eggers 37'		45' Theo Janssen; 65' Goeram Kasjia; 74' Jan-Arie van der Heijden

Ridderkerk, Ridderkerk
Attendance: 1,600
Referee: Allard Lindhout
25 September 2013
18:45

PSV	4-1	Telstar
Florian Jozefzoon 40'; Jürgen Locadia (pen) 45'; Jürgen Locadia (pen) 74'; Jürgen Locadia 90'		9' Diangi Matusiwa

Philips Stadion, Eindhoven
Attendance: 15,000
Referee: Reinold Wiedemeijer
25 September 2013
20:00

AZ	4-1 (a.e.t.)	Sparta Rotterdam
Aron Jóhannsson 5'; Aron Jóhannsson 91'; Aron Jóhannsson 105'; Steven Berghuis 119'		8' Johan Voskamp

AFAS Stadion, Alkmaar
Attendance: 11,231
Referee: Pol van Boekel
25 September 2013
20:00

FC Utrecht	4-1	FC Den Bosch
Jens Toornstra 15'; Jens Toornstra 47'; Gévero Markiet 53'; Steve De Ridder 84'		69' (o.g.) Mark van der Maarel

Stadion Galgenwaard, Utrecht
Attendance: 8,550
Referee: Serdar Gözübüyük
25 September 2013
20:00

PEC Zwolle	2-0	Fortuna Sittard
Rochdi Achenteh 20'; Joost Broerse 86'

IJsseldelta stadion, Zwolle
Attendance: 7,600
Referee: Jeroen Sanders
25 September 2013
20:00

ASWH	1-0	ADO '20
Ferry van Lare 15'

Schildman, Hendrik-Ido-Ambacht
Attendance: 450
Referee: Erwin Blank
25 September 2013
20:00

Hoek	3-0	HBS
Guillaume Clinckemaillie (pen) 71'; Kyle Doesburg 84'; Fabian Wilson 90'

Denoek, Hoek
Attendance: 600
Referee: Bob Grilis
25 September 2013
20:00

De Zouaven	0-2	Noordwijk
		62' Denzel James; 75' Stefan Mertens

Sportcomplex Middelweg, Hoorn
Attendance: 525
Referee: Tom Koekoek
25 September 2013
20:45

Ajax	4-2 (a.e.t.)	FC Volendam
Lucas Andersen 27'; Lasse Schöne 97'; Danny Hoesen 112'; Lasse Schöne 115'		67' Robert Mühren; 94' Robert Mühren

Amsterdam ArenA, Amsterdam
Attendance: 27,715
Referee: Ed Janssen
26 September 2013
18:45

sc Heerenveen	3-0	FC Twente
Luciano Slagveer 20'; Alfred Finnbogason 50'; Alfred Finnbogason 63'		(yellow card) 21' (yellow-red card) 24' Roberto Rosales

Abe Lenstra Stadion, Heerenveen
Attendance: 13,000
Referee: Pieter Vink
26 September 2013
20:00

Wilhelmina '08	3-1	SWZ/Boso Sneek
Perrin Hendrix 8'; Roy Schijven 65'; Perrin Hendrix 78'		49' Tjeerd Andringa

Drakesteyn, Weert
Attendance: 200
Referee: Bas van Dongen
26 September 2013
20:00

De Treffers	0-1	EVV
		26' Michèle Meerburg

Sportpark Zuid, Groesbeek
Attendance: 500
Referee: Martin Pérez
26 September 2013
20:45

Feyenoord	3-0	FC Dordrecht
Graziano Pellè 36'; Ruben Schaken 64'; Samuel Armenteros 90'

De Kuip, Rotterdam
Attendance: 28,000
Referee: Dennis Higler

== Third round ==
These matches took place on 29, 30 and 31 October 2013.

29 October 2013
18:45

Ajax	4-1	ASWH
Viktor Fischer 20'; Danny Hoesen 42'; Siem de Jong 45'; Kolbeinn Sigþórsson 71'		28' Michael van Dommelen

Amsterdam ArenA, Amsterdam
Attendance: 17,861
Referee: Jeroen Sanders
29 October 2013
19:00

MVV	2-1	ADO Den Haag
Rick Geenen 37'; Rick Geenen 43'		65' Mike van Duinen

De Geusselt, Maastricht
Attendance: 4,770
Referee: Bas Nijhuis
29 October 2013
20:00

FC Emmen	2-3	IJsselmeervogels
Alexander Bannink 6'; Quenten Martinus 19' (yellow card) 18' (yellow-red card) 60'		10' Thomas Verheydt; 55' Thomas Verheydt; 66' Achmed Ahahaoui; (yellow card) 82' (yellow-red card) 83' Nabil El Gourari

Stadion Meerdijk, Emmen
Attendance: 2,000
Referee: Allard Lindhout
29 October 2013
20:00

JVC Cuijk	3-0	EVV
Kevin van Veen 12'; Kevin van Veen 45'; Cayfano Latupeirissa 48'

De Groenendijkse Kampen, Cuijk
Attendance: 1,200
Referee: Jeroen Manschot
29 October 2013
20:00

FC Eindhoven	0-1	N.E.C.
		8' Michael Higdon

Jan Louwers Stadion, Eindhoven
Attendance: 1,314
Referee: Serdar Gözübüyük
29 October 2013
20:15

Kozakken Boys	1-2 (a.e.t.)	FC Utrecht
Arif Irilmazbilek 26'		63' Jacob Mulenga; 93' Jens Toornstra

De Zwaaier, Werkendam
Attendance: 4,000
Referee: Eric Braamhaar
29 October 2013
20:45

SC Cambuur	2-2 (5-4 pen.) (a.e.t.)	NAC Breda
Marcel Ritzmaier 5'; Alexander Christovao 45'		58' Mats Seuntjens; 84' Anouar Hadouir

Cambuur Stadion, Leeuwarden
Attendance: 5,044
Referee: Pieter Vink
30 October 2013
18:45

PSV	1-3	Roda JC Kerkrade
Joshua Brenet 87'		18' Mark-Jan Fledderus; 37' Guus Hupperts; 67' Guus Hupperts

Philips Stadion, Eindhoven
Attendance: 19,000
Referee: Pol van Boekel
30 October 2013
19:00

AZ	7-0	Achilles '29
Denni Avdić 4'; Ridgeciano Haps 23'; Jeffrey Gouweleeuw 30'; Denni Avdić 33'; Fernando Lewis 46'; Fernando Lewis 56'; Joris van Overeem 88'

AFAS Stadion, Alkmaar
Attendance: 8,477
Referee: Richard Liesveld
30 October 2013
20:00

Vitesse	5-0	Noordwijk
Gaël Kakuta 2'; Frank van der Struijk 35'; Giorgi Tsjantoeria 72'; Francisco Santos da Silva Junior 77'; Gaël Kakuta 84'

GelreDome, Arnhem
Attendance: 6,210
Referee: Dennis Higler
30 October 2013
20:00

PEC Zwolle	4-0	Wilhelmina '08
Ryan Thomas 7'; Giovanni Hiwat 17'; Darryl Lachman 23'; Fred Benson 26'

IJsseldelta stadion, Zwolle
Attendance: 6,000
Referee: Reinold Wiedemeijer
30 October 2013
20:00

Excelsior '31	2-5	Heracles Almelo
Andreas David 85'; Gerald ten Hove 87'		36' Mark Uth; 62' Mark Uth; 67' Mikhail Rosheuvel; 81' Simon Cziommer; 90' Bryan Linssen

De Koerbelt, Rijssen
Attendance: 4,000
Referee: Björn Kuipers
30 October 2013
20:00

FC Groningen	2-0	Capelle
Jahrizino Valentijn (o.g.) 25'; Eric Botteghin 79'

Euroborg, Groningen
Attendance: 8,974
Referee: Tom van Sichem
30 October 2013
20:45

Feyenoord	3-0	Hoek
Reguillo Vandepitte (o.g.) 31'; Otman Bakkal 63'; Mitchell te Vrede 67'

De Kuip, Rotterdam
Attendance: 21,000
Referee: Ed Janssen
31 October 2013
18:45

sc Heerenveen	1-0	VVV-Venlo
Ramon Zomer 22'

Abe Lenstra Stadion, Heerenveen
Attendance: 12,000
Referee: Danny Makkelie
31 October 2013
20:45

Excelsior	1-0	Go Ahead Eagles
Moussa Kalisse 90'

Woudestein, Rotterdam
Attendance: 1,753
Referee: Jochem Kamphuis

== Fourth round ==
These matches took place on 17, 18 and 19 December 2013.

17 December 2013
20:00

Excelsior	1-4	PEC Zwolle
Lars Veldwijk 78'		8' Fred Benson; 10' Fred Benson; 76' Giovanni Hiwat; 83' Rochdi Achenteh

Woudestein, Rotterdam
Attendance: 2,467
Referee: Ed Janssen
18 December 2013
18:45

AZ	2-2 (7-6 pen.) (a.e.t.)	sc Heerenveen
Aron Jóhannsson 19'; Aron Jóhannsson 105'		9' Hakim Ziyech; 120' (pen) Hakim Ziyech

AFAS Stadion, Alkmaar
Attendance: 11,121
Referee: Danny Makkelie
18 December 2013
19:45

Roda JC Kerkrade	3-1	Vitesse
Guus Hupperts 66'; Marc Höcher 83'; Guus Hupperts 90'		75' Patrick van Aanholt

Parkstad Limburg Stadion, Kerkrade
Attendance: 6,788
Referee: Kevin Blom
18 December 2013
20:00

SC Cambuur	0-2	FC Utrecht
		13' (o.g.) Leonard Nienhuis; 79' Steve De Ridder

Cambuur Stadion, Leeuwarden
Attendance: 5,774
Referee: Richard Liesveld
18 December 2013
20:00

JVC Cuijk	2-1	MVV
Fathi Ben Ahmed 20'; Kevin van Veen 43'		53' Maic Sema

De Groenendijkse Kampen, Cuijk
Attendance: 3,500
Referee: Jeroen Manschot
18 December 2013
20:45

Heracles Almelo	1-1 (a.e.t.)	Feyenoord
Bryan Linssen 27'		12' Graziano Pellè; (yellow card) 33' (yellow-red card) 93' Stefan de Vrij

Polman Stadion, Almelo
Attendance: 6,012
Referee: Bas Nijhuis
19 December 2013
18:45

FC Groningen	0-1	N.E.C.
		45' Søren Rieks

Euroborg, Groningen
Attendance: 10,816
Referee: Reinold Wiedemeijer
19 December 2013
20:45

IJsselmeervogels	0-3	Ajax
		4' Viktor Fischer; 9' Danny Hoesen; 63' Viktor Fischer

De Westmaat, Spakenburg
Attendance: 7,500
Referee: Tom van Sichem

== Quarter-finals ==
These matches took place on 21 and 22 January 2014.

21 januari 2014
20:45

Roda JC Kerkrade	0-2	AZ
Németh (red card) 57'	Report	32' (o.g.) Biemans; 59' Jóhansson

Parkstad Limburg Stadion, Kerkrade
Attendance: 8,385
Referee: Serdar Gözübüyük
22 januari 2014
18:45

PEC Zwolle	5-1	JVC Cuijk
van Hintum 3' van der Werff 16' van Gerwen 19' (o.g.); Mahmudov 60', 78'	Report	70' van Veen

IJsseldelta Stadion, Zwolle
Attendance: 6,575
Referee: Jochem Kamphuis
22 januari 2014
19:45

N.E.C.	1-0	FC Utrecht
Vermijl 8'	Report

Goffertstadion, Nijmegen
Attendance: 6,000
Referee: Tom van Sichem
22 januari 2014
20:45

Ajax	3-1	Feyenoord
Fischer 34'; Krkić 68'; Serero 90'	Report	7' Boëtius

Amsterdam Arena, Amsterdam
Attendance: 50,340
Referee: Kevin Blom

== Semi-finals ==
26 March 2014
20:45

PEC Zwolle	2–1	NEC
Drost 29'; Karagounis 81'		Conboy 39'

IJsseldelta Stadion, Zwolle
Attendance: 10,800
Referee: Danny Makkelie

27 March 2014
20:45

AZ	0–1	Ajax
		Schöne 48'

AFAS Stadion, Alkmaar
Attendance: 16,321
Referee: Pol van Boekel

== Final ==
20 April 2014
18:00

PEC Zwolle	5−1	Ajax
Thomas 8', 12'; Fernandez 22', 34' van Polen 50'		van Rhijn 3'

De Kuip, Rotterdam
Attendance: 42,500
Referee: Bas Nijhuis
