= Stan van Bladeren =

Dutch footballer (born 1997)

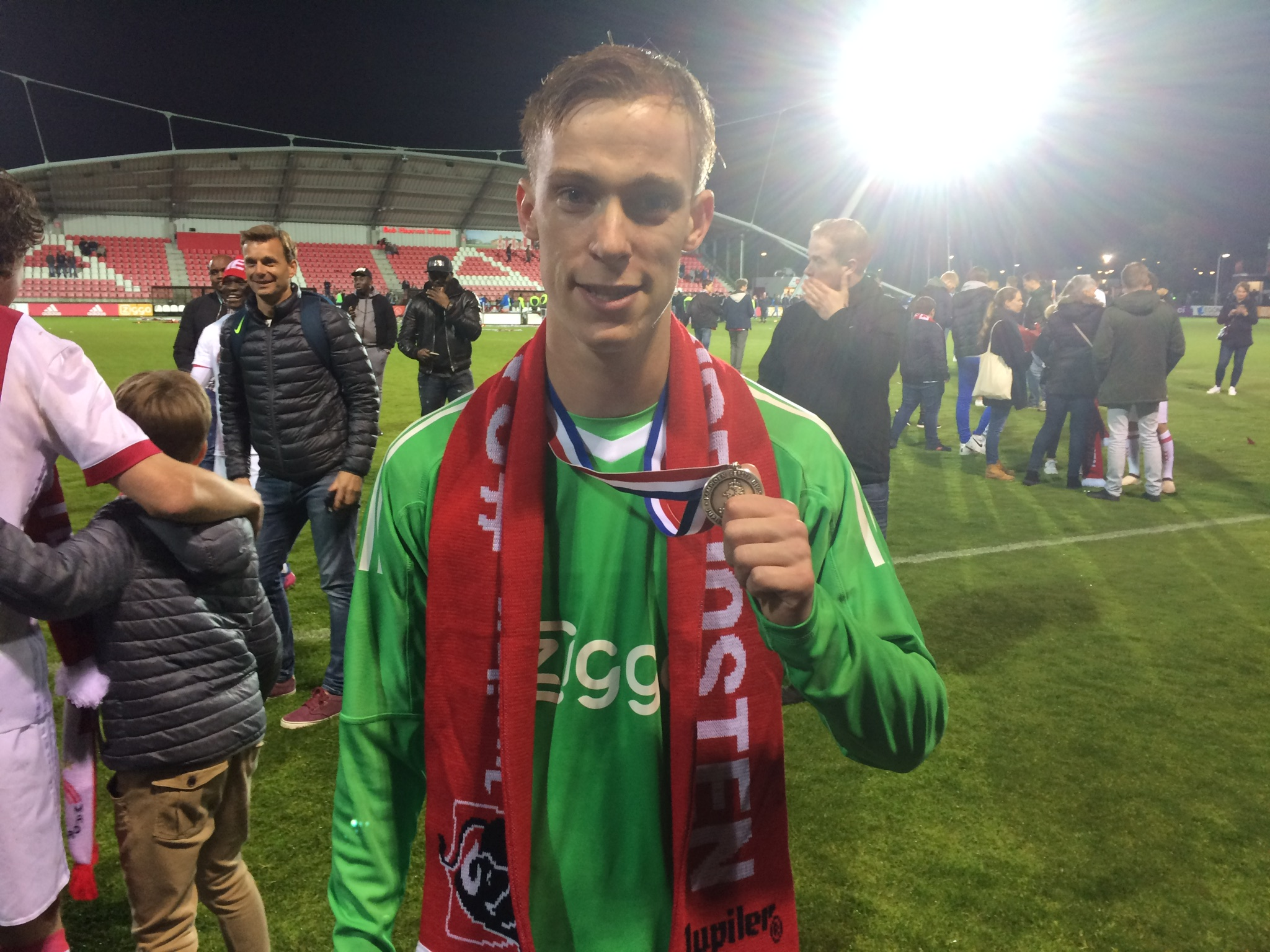
- Van Bladeren in 2018

Personal information
- Date of birth: 1 October 1997 (age 29)
- Place of birth: Voorhout, Netherlands
- Position: Goalkeeper

Team information
- Current team: Katwijk
- Number: 41

Youth career
- Foreholte
- 2012–2015: Ajax

Senior career*
Years	Team	Apps	(Gls)
2015–2020	Jong Ajax	15	(0)
2018–2020	Ajax	0	(0)
2020–2022	Silkeborg	4	(0)
2022–2024	Helsingør	7	(0)
2024–	Katwijk	51	(0)

International career
2013–2014	Netherlands U17	2	(0)
2014	Netherlands U18	4	(0)
2015	Netherlands U19	1	(0)
- * Club domestic league appearances and goals as of 21:46, 20 October 2026 (UTC)

Stan van Bladeren (born 1 October 1997) is a Dutch footballer who plays as a goalkeeper for Tweede Divisie club Katwijk.

A product of the Ajax academy, he made 15 appearances for Jong Ajax and was part of the side that won the Eerste Divisie in 2018, before a wrist injury ended a planned move to Helmond Sport in 2019. He spent four seasons in Denmark with Silkeborg and Helsingør before returning to the Netherlands with Katwijk in 2024.

== Early life ==
Van Bladeren was born in Voorhout and began playing football at local club Foreholte, where Edwin van der Sar had also started out. He joined the Ajax academy in 2012.

== Club career ==
=== Ajax ===
Van Bladeren made his professional debut for Jong Ajax on 6 February 2015, at the age of 17, in a 4–3 away win over Volendam in the Eerste Divisie. The following year, while keeping goal for the Ajax under-19 side, he won the LJ Sport Talent Prize in his home municipality of Teylingen in recognition of his move into professional football. Injury and competition from Tim Krul, who was playing for Jong Ajax at the time, left him with few opportunities in the reserve side, and when Krul left for AZ, Van Bladeren said he would fight to become Jong Ajax's first-choice goalkeeper.

He played several league matches in the 2017–18 season, in which Jong Ajax won the Eerste Divisie under Michael Reiziger. A point clear of Fortuna Sittard going into the final round, they came from behind to beat MVV 2–1 on 28 April 2018 and clinch the title. In a profile published during that season, 433 Magazine described him as a goalkeeper with a great deal of potential, and he named an unofficial first-team appearance in a friendly against Lyon in July 2017 as a highlight of his time at the club. He made 15 appearances for Jong Ajax in all.

On 27 August 2019, Ajax agreed to transfer him to Eerste Divisie club Helmond Sport with immediate effect. The move collapsed at the last moment when he failed his medical, as a wrist injury needed longer to heal than had been expected. He remained at Ajax until his contract ran out in June 2020.

=== Silkeborg ===
After a trial, Van Bladeren signed a two-year contract with Danish 1st Division club Silkeborg on 24 August 2020 to compete with first-choice goalkeeper Oscar Hedvall. He served mainly as back-up, making four league appearances in his first season as Silkeborg won promotion to the Danish Superliga and none in the second as the club finished third to qualify for Europe. His contract was not renewed when it expired in the summer of 2022.

=== Helsingør ===
On 1 July 2022, Van Bladeren joined Danish 1st Division club FC Helsingør on a contract until the summer of 2024, with goalkeeping coach Simon Hansen saying the club had been following him for some time.

=== Katwijk ===
On 12 June 2024, Tweede Divisie club Katwijk announced that Van Bladeren would join that summer on a one-year contract with a club option for a second season. He said he had increasingly questioned whether to stay in professional football, and that he and his girlfriend had decided to return to their roots so that he could focus on a career outside the game, adding that his parents had been born in Katwijk. Technical manager Cees Bruinink cited his personality and leadership qualities as well as his goalkeeping. On 18 December 2024, he started Katwijk's 3–2 home defeat to Eredivisie club Twente in the second round of the 2024–25 KNVB Cup.

On 28 October 2025, Katwijk hosted Eerste Divisie club Vitesse in the first round of the 2025–26 KNVB Cup, and after a 1–1 draw Van Bladeren saved three penalties as Katwijk won the shoot-out 4–3. After saving a penalty with the score at 3–3, he believed the tie was won and leapt into the crowd to celebrate, only for the shoot-out to continue. He then saved Ashraf Moustafa's kick, and Levi Bouwense scored the winning penalty. Van Bladeren later blamed the premature celebration on his "short-term memory", and said he hoped to draw his former club Ajax in the next round so that he could play at the Johan Cruyff Arena. Katwijk were instead drawn away to FC Den Bosch, who won 2–1 on 16 December 2025.

Katwijk signed Mitchel Michaelis ahead of the 2026–27 season, and Van Bladeren remained with the club.

== Honours ==
Jong Ajax

- Eerste Divisie: 2017–18
