= Maatsen =

Maatsen is a Dutch surname. Notable people with the surname include:

- Dalian Maatsen (born 1994), Dutch footballer
- Darren Maatsen (born 1991), Dutch footballer
- Ian Maatsen (born 2002), Dutch footballer
