= Hilterman =

Hilterman is a surname. Notable people with the surname include:

- Jeredy Hilterman (born 1998), Dutch footballer
- Jordy Hilterman (born 1996), Dutch footballer

== See also ==
- Hiltermann
