= Raoul Esseboom =

Dutch footballer (born 1992)

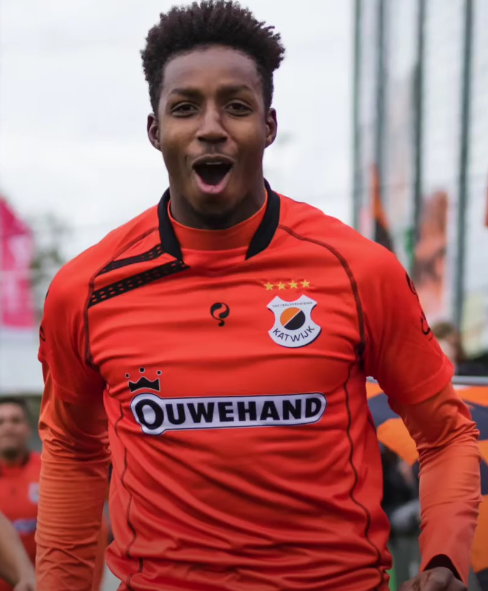

Personal information
- Date of birth: 9 November 1992 (age 33)
- Place of birth: Amsterdam, Netherlands
- Height: 1.88 m (6 ft 2 in)
- Position: Centre-back

Youth career
- SV Alliance '22
- Haarlem
- Telstar
- EDO
- 200?–2011: VV Young Boys
- 2011–2012: PSV

Senior career*
Years	Team	Apps	(Gls)
2012–2017	Volendam	52	(1)
2017–2023	Katwijk	103	(5)
- * Club domestic league appearances and goals as of 09:06, 4 June 2023 (UTC)

Raoul Esseboom (born 9 November 1992) is a Dutch footballer who plays for Tweede Divisie club VV Katwijk.

== Club career ==
Esseboom joined Jong PSV Eindhoven in June 2011 as an 18-year-old from Haarlem based amateur side VV Young Boys, but left after one season for Eerste Divisie outfit FC Volendam. He made his professional debut for Volendam on 20 October 2013 against Jong FC Twente.

In summer 2017, Esseboom moved to Tweede Divisie club Katwijk. He quit football in 2023 to focus on his crypto coin business.

== Honours ==
Katwijk

- Tweede Divisie: 2021–22, 2022–23
