= Bart Sinteur =

Dutch footballer (born 1998)

Personal information
- Date of birth: 31 May 1998 (age 28)
- Place of birth: Leiderdorp, Netherlands
- Height: 1.75 m (5 ft 9 in)
- Position: Right-back

Team information
- Current team: Katwijk
- Number: 15

Youth career
- –2007: RCL
- 2007–2017: Feyenoord

Senior career*
Years	Team	Apps	(Gls)
2017–2018	Jong Utrecht	16	(0)
2018–	Katwijk	219	(15)
- * Club domestic league appearances and goals as of 20:01, 19 October 2026 (UTC)

Bart Sinteur (born 31 May 1998) is a Dutch footballer who plays as a right-back for Tweede Divisie club Katwijk.

A product of the Feyenoord academy, he represented the Netherlands at under-14, under-15 and under-16 level before making his professional debut for Jong FC Utrecht in the Eerste Divisie in 2017. When his contract at Utrecht expired a year later, he stepped down to the amateur game with Katwijk, where he quickly became a regular starter, and won consecutive Tweede Divisie titles in 2022 and 2023.

== Club career ==
=== Early career ===
Born in Leiderdorp, Sinteur began playing football at local club RCL before Feyenoord scouted him at under-11 level. He spent ten years in the Rotterdam club's academy, during which he represented the Netherlands at under-14, under-15 and under-16 level and, as an under-19 player, featured regularly for Jong Feyenoord. He never reached the first team, however, and later reflected that, although he had always been a starter in the youth sides, a breakthrough at a club of Feyenoord's size had never been realistic.

=== Utrecht ===
Sinteur left Feyenoord on a free transfer and signed a one-year contract with FC Utrecht on 7 June 2017, as one of six new players for the club's reserve side, Jong FC Utrecht, which competed in the Eerste Divisie. Having seen the team survive its first season at that level, Utrecht's head coach and technical manager Erik ten Hag said the club now wanted to raise the bar.

Sinteur made his debut on 21 August 2017, starting in a 3–0 home defeat to TOP Oss, and went on to make 16 league appearances in a season in which Jong Utrecht finished bottom of the table. The club had intended to build the side around a settled group of young players, but first-team players increasingly dropped down to gain match rhythm. Although Sinteur later admitted that he might have developed further elsewhere, he said he had no regrets about choosing Utrecht over the other clubs that had shown interest.

His contract expired in the summer of 2018. "There was simply no possibility of staying at FC Utrecht," he recalled. His agent told him he could still join a professional club on an amateur basis, but only if he paid all his own costs, and after long discussions with his father, Sinteur chose to step down a level.

=== Katwijk ===
Several clubs from the Bollenstreek region and Excelsior Maassluis showed interest, but Katwijk, which had already enquired about him when he left Feyenoord, stood out. His father had kept in touch with Katwijk assistant coach Patrick Heijmans, who put Sinteur's name forward again, and he joined the Tweede Divisie club in the summer of 2018. As part of the move, club chairman Mart Vergouwen arranged a job for him as a security officer at Amsterdam Airport Schiphol through his own company.

Although the club's technical committee had urged him to be patient, Sinteur won a starting place immediately, and in early October he scored his first goal for Katwijk in an away win over HHC Hardenberg. He made such an impression that on 10 October 2018 the club reopened his contract and extended it until the end of the 2020–21 season, with an option for a further year. Even so, he still hoped to return to professional football, saying that he would certainly try again if a club came in for him.

No such move materialised. Sinteur signed a further two-year extension on 11 December 2020, and remained an undisputed starter as Katwijk won the Tweede Divisie in the 2021–22 season. In September 2022, with the club now reigning champions, he committed his future until mid-2025, and the following May Katwijk retained the title with a 2–1 win over Spakenburg, claiming the Dutch amateur championship for the second year running. Sinteur was part of both title-winning squads.

On 18 December 2024, he started against Eredivisie club FC Twente in the second round of the 2024–25 KNVB Cup in front of 5,000 spectators at Sportpark De Krom, where Twente held on for a 3–2 win despite a late goal from Mohammed Tahiri. The following month, Katwijk announced that he had extended his expiring contract by two seasons. Following the retirements of Robbert Susan and Kay Blokland, he had by then become the player with the most appearances in the squad, and Cees Bruinink, speaking on behalf of the club, described him as an example to his teammates through his drive and commitment.

In October 2026, after a long spell without the armband, Sinteur captained Katwijk against IJsselmeervogels, but the side conceded in the closing stages and slipped to a third successive defeat, which left them 13th in the Tweede Divisie early in the 2026–27 season.

== Honours ==
Katwijk

- Tweede Divisie: 2021–22, 2022–23
