= Matthijs Hardijk =

Dutch footballer (born 1997)

Personal information
- Date of birth: 25 December 1997 (age 28)
- Place of birth: Hoogezand, Netherlands
- Height: 1.83 m (6 ft 0 in)
- Position: Forward

Team information
- Current team: IJsselmeervogels
- Number: 11

Youth career
- –2015: VV Hoogezand
- 2015–2016: FC Groningen

Senior career*
Years	Team	Apps	(Gls)
2016–2017	Harkemase Boys	32	(6)
2017–2018	Jong AZ	22	(0)
2018–2019	Jong Groningen	33	(9)
2019–2020	ACV	21	(13)
2020–2023	HHC	70	(18)
2023–2024	Katwijk	50	(9)
2025–	IJsselmeervogels	48	(8)
- * Club domestic league appearances and goals as of 1 October 2026

Matthijs Hardijk (born 25 December 1997) is a Dutch footballer who plays as a winger for Tweede Divisie club IJsselmeervogels.

== Career ==
During his early career, Hardijk was part of the youth setups of VV Hoogezand and FC Groningen. In 2016, he moved to amateur club Harkemase Boys, where he was a key player in the Derde Divisie. As a result of his performances, he joined AZ in April 2017.

He made his professional Eerste Divisie debut for Jong AZ on 18 August 2017 in a game against FC Den Bosch, replacing Abdel Malek El Hasnaoui in the 72nd minute.

On 25 May 2018, it was announced that Hardijk would return to Groningen, where he was to compete for the reserves in the Derde Divisie in the 2018–19 season.

In June 2019, Hardijk joined Hoofdklasse club ACV Assen from Jong Groningen. After one season, he moved to HHC Hardenberg in the Tweede Divisie after agreeing to the deal in January 2020.

Hardijk experienced his breakthrough for the club during the 2022–23 season, where he was top goalscorer for the club, scoring 17 goals in 34 appearances as Hardenberg finished fourth in the third tier.

After three seasons at Hardenberg, Hardijk signed with defending amateur champions Katwijk in 2023 due to him moving to Amsterdam in connection to his civil career. In January 2025, he joined IJsselmeervogels.

== Career statistics ==
As of match played 13 April 2024

Appearances and goals by club, season and competition
Club	Season	League			KNVB Cup		Other		Total	
Club	Season	Division	Apps	Goals	Apps	Goals	Apps	Goals	Apps	Goals
Harkemase Boys	2016–17	Derde Divisie	32	6	2	1	4 (Note: Appearances in Derde Divisie promotion/relegation playoffs)	0	38	7
Jong AZ	2017–18	Eerste Divisie	22	0	—		—		22	0
Jong Groningen	2018–19	Derde Divisie	33	9	—		—		33	9
ACV Assen	2019–20	Hoofdklasse	21	13	0	0	—		21	13
Hardenberg	2020–21	Tweede Divisie	6	0	1	0	—		7	0
Hardenberg	2021–22	Tweede Divisie	30	1	1	0	—		31	1
Hardenberg	2022–23	Tweede Divisie	34	17	1	0	—		35	17
Hardenberg	Total		70	18	3	0	—		73	18
Katwijk	2023–24	Tweede Divisie	28	6	2	0	—		30	6
Career total			206	52	7	1	4	0	217	53
