= Levi Bouwense =

Dutch footballer (born 2000)

Personal information
- Date of birth: 27 June 2000 (age 26)
- Place of birth: Goes, Netherlands
- Height: 1.86 m (6 ft 1 in)
- Position: Centre-back

Team information
- Current team: Katwijk
- Number: 21

Youth career
- Bevelanders
- –2013: JVOZ
- 2013–2018: Sparta Rotterdam

Senior career*
Years	Team	Apps	(Gls)
2018–2020	Jong Sparta	54	(0)
2019–2020	Sparta	1	(0)
2020–2021	Jong Almere	4	(0)
2021–2022	ASWH	27	(0)
2022–	Katwijk	107	(3)

International career
2018	Netherlands U19	3	(0)
- * Club domestic league appearances and goals as of 6 May 2026

Levi Bouwense (born 27 June 2000) is a Dutch footballer who plays as a centre-back for Tweede Divisie club Katwijk.

He played 3 games for the Netherlands national under-19 football team.

== Club career ==
Academy product Bouwense signed professional terms with Sparta in 2018.

In the 2020–21 season he played for Almere City FC. In February 2021 he joined ASWH in the summer of 2021. In 2022, he signed with VV Katwijk.

== Career statistics ==
=== Club ===
As of 11 December 2019

Club	Season	League			Cup		Europe		Other		Total	
Club	Season	Division	Apps	Goals	Apps	Goals	Apps	Goals	Apps	Goals	Apps	Goals
Sparta Rotterdam II	2017–18	Tweede Divisie	8	0	0	0	—		0	0	8	0
Sparta Rotterdam II	2018–19	Tweede Divisie	26	0	0	0	—		0	0	26	0
Sparta Rotterdam II	2019–20	Tweede Divisie	11	0	0	0	—		0	0	11	0
Sparta Rotterdam II	Total		45	0	0	0	0	0	0	0	45	0
Sparta Rotterdam	2019–20	Eerste Divisie	1	0	0	0	—		0	0	1	0
Career total			46	0	0	0	0	0	0	0	46	0

== Honours ==
Katwijk

- Tweede Divisie: 2022–23
