= Hiltermann =

Hiltermann is a surname. Notable people with the surname include:

- Suzanne Hiltermann-Souloumiac (born 1919), member of the Dutch-Paris Resistance Network
- Bob Hiltermann (born 1952), German-born deaf actor and drummer
- G.B.J. Hiltermann (1914–2000), Dutch journalist, political commentator, publisher and historian
- Joost Hiltermann, American activist, journalist and writer.

== See also ==
- Hilterman
