= Rick van der Meer =

Dutch footballer (born 1997)

Personal information
- Date of birth: 14 June 1997 (age 29)
- Place of birth: Schiedam, Netherlands
- Height: 1.83 m (6 ft 0 in)
- Position: Defensive midfielder

Team information
- Current team: Katwijk
- Number: 6

Youth career
- Excelsior Maassluis
- 2010–2016: Feyenoord

Senior career*
Years	Team	Apps	(Gls)
2016–2019	Jong Utrecht	56	(0)
2019–	Katwijk	203	(8)

International career
2014	Netherlands U18	3	(0)
- * Club domestic league appearances and goals as of 18:22, 19 October 2026 (UTC)

Rick van der Meer (born 14 June 1997) is a Dutch footballer who plays as a defensive midfielder for Tweede Divisie club Katwijk.

== Club career ==
Van der Meer progressed through the youth teams of Excelsior Maassluis and Feyenoord. He then moved to Utrecht, making his professional debut in the Eerste Divisie for the reserve team Jong Utrecht on 5 August 2016 in a game against NAC Breda. He signed his first professional contract with the club on 2 November 2017, keeping him at the club until 2019.

In January 2019, Van der Meer joined Tweede Divisie club Katwijk on a one-and-a-half-year contract. He scored on his debut for the club, the final goal of a 3–0 home victory against De Treffers on 26 January 2019.

== International career ==
He was on the roster of the Netherlands national under-17 football team for the 2014 UEFA European Under-17 Championship, where Netherlands came as the runners-up. However, he was an unused substitute for every game in the tournament.

== Honours ==
Katwijk

- Tweede Divisie: 2021–22, 2022–23
