= Tony de Groot =

Dutch footballer (born 1988)

Personal information
- Date of birth: 24 March 1988 (age 38)
- Place of birth: Oss, Netherlands
- Height: 1.89 m (6 ft 2 in)
- Position: Striker

Youth career
- 1993–2000: OSS '20
- 2000–2007: TOP Oss

Senior career*
Years	Team	Apps	(Gls)
2007–2009	TOP Oss	40	(6)
2009–2010	De Treffers		
2010–2013	OJC Rosmalen		
2013–2023	OSS '20		
- * Club domestic league appearances and goals

Tony de Groot (born 24 March 1988) is a Dutch former professional footballer who played as a striker.

== Career ==
Born in Oss, De Groot began playing football at the age of five at OSS '20. At under-12 level, he was scouted by neighbor club TOP Oss after scoring many goals in the youth academy. De Groot made his debut in professional football on 30 September 2007 for TOP Oss against SC Cambuur in the second-tier Eerste Divisie, scoring on his first touch as a substitute.

After leaving TOP Oss in 2009, De Groot played for lower league sides De Treffers and OJC Rosmalen before signing with hometown side OSS '20 in 2013. He was voted Player of the Year of the Derde Divisie in 2019. He had a title push with OSS' 20 in the 2019–20 season, but when the season was abandoned due to the COVID-19 pandemic, the club missed promotion to the third-tier Tweede Divisie despite leading the league by 25 points down to second placed Jong ADO Den Haag.

De Groot retired from football at the end of the 2022–23 season.
