= Eef van Riel =

Dutch footballer

Personal information
- Date of birth: 24 December 1991 (age 34)
- Place of birth: Gendt, Netherlands
- Height: 1.85 m (6 ft 1 in)
- Position: Midfielder

Team information
- Current team: IJsselmeervogels
- Number: 16

Youth career
- VV De Bataven

Senior career*
Years	Team	Apps	(Gls)
–2012	VV De Bataven		
2012–2015	De Treffers	81	(9)
2015–2017	Achilles '29	31	(2)
2017–2018	De Treffers	31	(0)
2018–	IJsselmeervogels	53	(5)
- * Club domestic league appearances and goals as of 9 September 2020

Eef van Riel (born 24 December 1991) is a Dutch footballer who plays for IJsselmeervogels in the Dutch Tweede Divisie.

== Club career ==
He made his professional debut in the Eerste Divisie for Achilles '29 on 7 August 2015 in a game against Jong Ajax.
