= Danny Stassar =

Dutch footballer

Personal information
- Date of birth: 19 September 1997 (age 29)
- Place of birth: Netherlands
- Height: 1.81 m (5 ft 11 in)
- Position: Centre back

Team information
- Current team: Groene Ster
- Number: 17

Youth career
- Groene Ster
- Roda JC

Senior career*
Years	Team	Apps	(Gls)
2016–2017	Roda JC	0	(0)
2017–	Groene Ster	119	(1)
- * Club domestic league appearances and goals as of 4 August 2025

Danny Stassar (born 19 September 1997) is a Dutch footballer who plays as a centre back for Groene Ster.

== Club career ==
He made his professional debut in the Eredivisie for Roda JC Kerkrade on 9 December 2016 in a game against FC Groningen.
