= Mitchel Michaelis =

Dutch footballer (born 1993)

Personal information
- Date of birth: 1 July 1993 (age 33)
- Place of birth: Den Helder, Netherlands
- Height: 2.04 m (6 ft 8 in)
- Position: Goalkeeper

Team information
- Current team: Katwijk
- Number: 1

Youth career
- WGW
- FC Den Helder
- Hollandia
- Volendam

Senior career*
Years	Team	Apps	(Gls)
2012–2015	Volendam	0	(0)
2015–2016	OFC		
2016–2020	Jong Volendam	41	(0)
2016–2020	Volendam	17	(0)
2020–2021	Go Ahead Eagles	1	(0)
2021–2026	Koninklijke HFC	139	(0)
2026–	Katwijk	7	(0)
- * Club domestic league appearances and goals as of 18:15, 19 October 2026 (UTC)

Mitchel Michaelis (born 1 July 1993) is a Dutch footballer who plays as a goalkeeper for Tweede Divisie club Katwijk. He came through the youth academy of Volendam and played for the club in the Eerste Divisie. He made one league appearance for Go Ahead Eagles. He spent five seasons with Koninklijke HFC in the Tweede Divisie before joining Katwijk in 2026.

== Early life ==
Michaelis was born in Den Helder. He played youth football for WGW, FC Den Helder and Hollandia. He then joined the youth academy of Volendam.

== Club career ==
=== Volendam ===
Michaelis was a reserve goalkeeper at Volendam from 2011 to 2015. He joined Hoofdklasse club OFC in 2015, before returning to Volendam in the summer of 2016 after one season.

Michaelis made his Eerste Divisie debut on 21 September 2018 in a 1–0 defeat away to Jong PSV in the 2018–19 season, replacing Jordi van Stappershoef at half-time after he had suffered a concussion. Cody Gakpo scored the only goal in the 53rd minute.

On 7 December 2018, Michaelis collided with Rafik Zekhnini ten minutes into a match against Twente, sustaining a head injury. He was carried off on a stretcher and taken to hospital. Nordin Bakker replaced him and made his debut for the club.

A shoulder injury was expected to keep Michaelis out for around four months from June 2019. He made 18 first-team appearances for Volendam.

=== Go Ahead Eagles ===
Michaelis joined Eerste Divisie club Go Ahead Eagles in 2020. He made one league appearance for the club, partly attributed to injury.

=== Koninklijke HFC ===
On 6 May 2021, Michaelis signed for Tweede Divisie club Koninklijke HFC ahead of the 2021–22 season. HFC had been looking for a replacement for Tom Boks, who was leaving at the end of the season.

On 17 December 2024, Michaelis captained HFC against PSV in the 2024–25 KNVB Cup. His friend Joey Veerman captained PSV. PSV won 8–0 in Eindhoven.

In early 2026, Michaelis told HFC that he wanted to leave at the end of the 2025–26 season. He had planned to join RKAV Volendam in Volendam, where he lives. HFC described him as one of the best goalkeepers in the club's history.

=== Katwijk ===
On 18 March 2026, Katwijk announced that Michaelis would join the club ahead of the 2026–27 season, signing a one-year contract with a club option for a further season. Michaelis said he chose Katwijk because the club aimed to win the league. Cees Bruinink praised his reflexes and his dominance in the air on behalf of Katwijk.
