= Dwight Oehlers =

Aruban footballer

Personal information
- Date of birth: 31 July 1988 (age 38)
- Position: Defender

Team information
- Current team: SDO Bussum

Senior career*
Years	Team	Apps	(Gls)
2011–2012	Racing Club Aruba		
2012–	SDO Bussum		

International career^{‡}
2015–2016	Aruba	4	(0)
- * Club domestic league appearances and goals as of 14:55, 16 March 2018 (UTC) ‡ National team caps and goals as of 14:55, 16 March 2018 (UTC)

Dwight Oehlers (born 31 July 1988) is an Aruban international footballer who plays for Dutch club SDO Bussum, as a defender.

== Career ==
He has played club football for Racing Club Aruba and SDO Bussum.

He made his international debut for Aruba in 2015.
