= Dalian Maatsen =

Dutch footballer (born 1994)

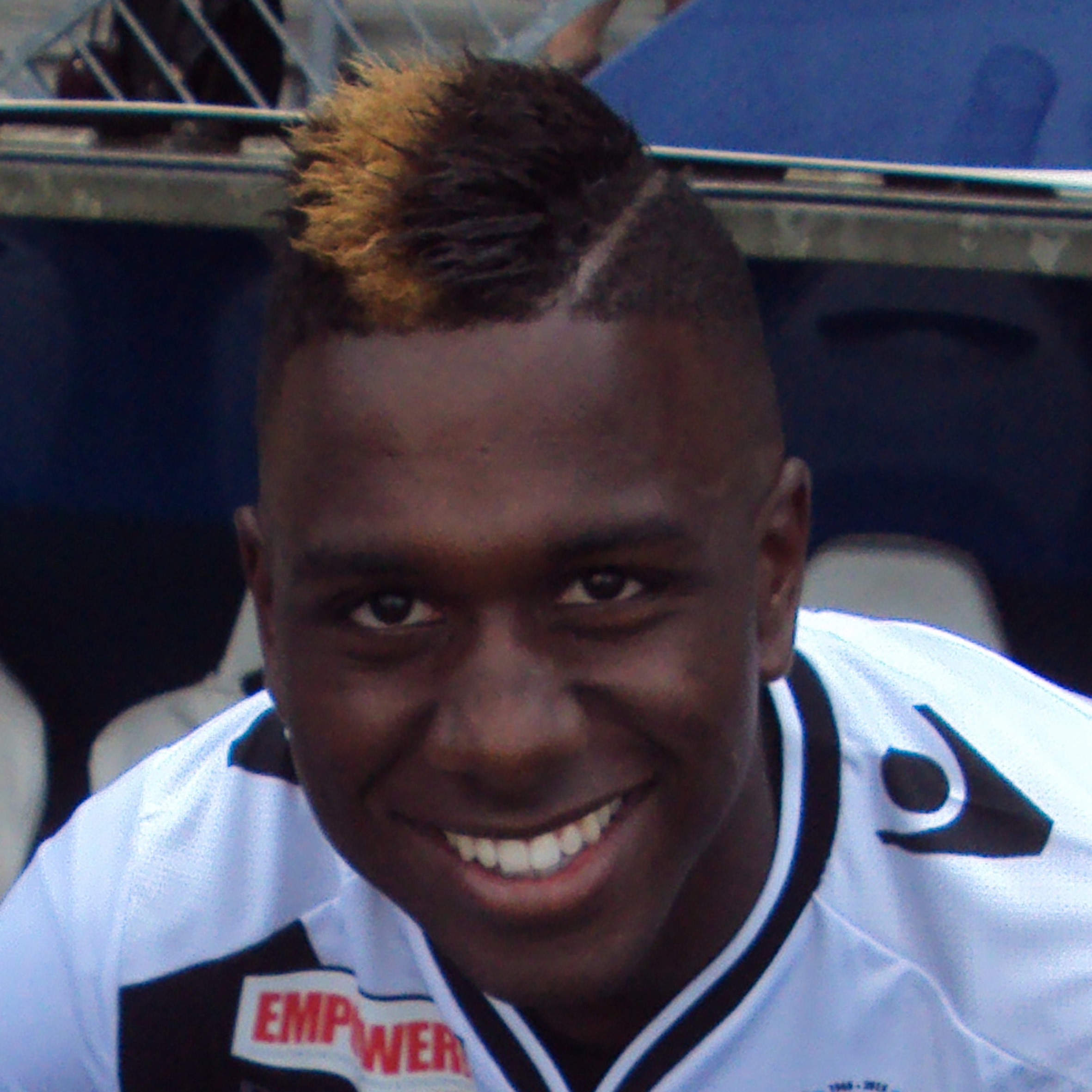
- Maatsen in 2015

Personal information
- Full name: Dalian Maatsen
- Date of birth: 2 January 1994 (age 32)
- Place of birth: Vlaardingen, Netherlands
- Height: 1.80 m (5 ft 11 in)
- Position: Centre back

Team information
- Current team: Katwijk
- Number: 4

Youth career
- Feyenoord
- NAC Breda

Senior career*
Years	Team	Apps	(Gls)
2013–2014	NAC Breda	0	(0)
2014–2015	MVV	18	(0)
2015–2017	Den Bosch	33	(0)
2017–2018	Vendsyssel FF	13	(0)
2018–2024	AFC	133	(7)
2024–	Katwijk	74	(6)
- * Club domestic league appearances and goals as of 18:18, 19 October 2026 (UTC)

Dalian Maatsen (born 2 January 1994) is a Dutch professional footballer who plays as a centre-back for Tweede Divisie club Katwijk.

== Personal ==
His brother is professional footballer Darren Maatsen.
