= Jordy Hilterman =

Dutch footballer (born 1996)

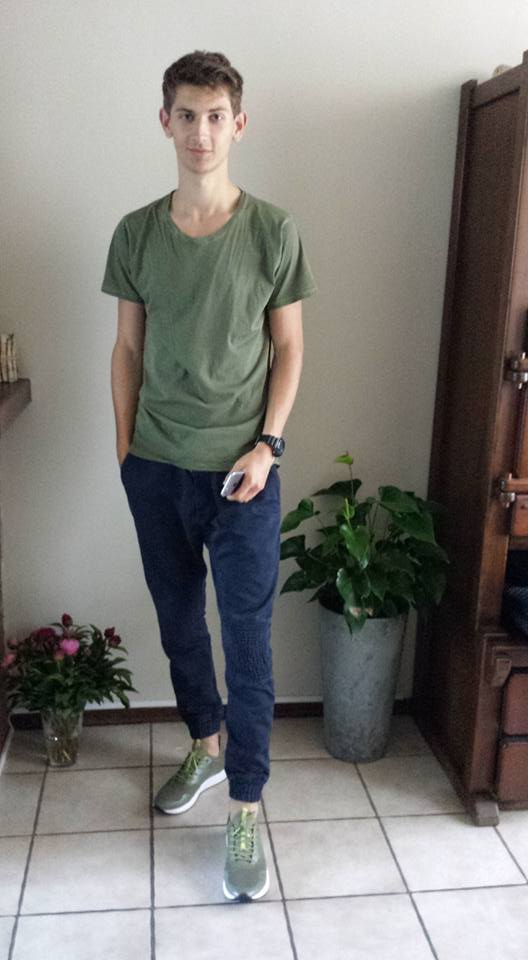

Personal information
- Date of birth: 9 June 1996 (age 30)
- Place of birth: Haarlem, Netherlands
- Height: 1.95 m (6 ft 5 in)
- Position: Forward

Team information
- Current team: Eemdijk
- Number: 14

Youth career
- EDO
- –2010: Haarlem
- 2010–2016: Volendam

Senior career*
| Years | Team | Apps | (Gls) |
| 2015–2018 | Jong Volendam | 69 | (22) |
| 2016–2018 | Volendam | 14 | (2) |
| 2018–2020 | Katwijk | 28 | (5) |
| 2020–2022 | Koninklijke HFC | 23 | (3) |
| 2022–2023 | Rijnsburgse Boys | 24 | (2) |
| 2023– | Eemdijk | 27 | (7) |
- * Club domestic league appearances and goals as of 7 October 2024

Jordy Hilterman (born 9 June 1996) is a Dutch footballer who plays as a forward for Eemdijk in the Derde Divisie.

== Club career ==
He made his professional debut in the Eerste Divisie for FC Volendam on 14 March 2016 in a game against SC Telstar. He moved to Katwijk in 2018 and to the Koninklijke HFC two years later.

On March 18, 2023, he joined VV Eemdijk but didn't join the club until the start of the 2023-2024 season. During the 2025-26 season he was converted from a striker to a holding midfielder.

== Personal life ==
His brother Jeredy Hilterman is a professional football player who is a Surinamese international.
