= Rob van Sonsbeek =

Dutch footballer (born 1993)

Personal information
- Date of birth: 22 August 1993 (age 33)
- Place of birth: Lith, Netherlands
- Height: 1.90 m (6 ft 3 in)
- Position: Forward

Youth career
- 1999–2003: SV Litta
- 2003–2010: TOP Oss

Senior career*
Years	Team	Apps	(Gls)
2010–2015	SV TOP		
2015–2017	RKC Waalwijk	22	(0)
2017–2023	OSS '20		
- * Club domestic league appearances and goals

Rob van Sonsbeek (born 22 August 1993) is a Dutch former professional footballer who played as a forward.

== Career ==
Van Sonsbeek started playing football at the age of six in the youth academy of SV Litta, which later merged into NLC '03. After four years, TOP Oss scouted him, marking the start of his professional career. In 2010, he briefly returned to the amateur branch of TOP Oss, SV TOP, where he immediately joined the first team. During the 2014–15 season, playing for TOP in the Sunday Hoofdklasse B, he showcased his scoring prowess with 19 goals.

Following this successful season, Van Sonsbeek made a move to RKC Waalwijk in 2015, an Eerste Divisie team that had finished last in the previous season. Earlier, he had been on trial for a while, along with Wimilio Vink from MVV. During the first matchday, Van Sonsbeek made his professional debut when manager Peter van den Berg allowed him to play the full ninety minutes in a 1–1 draw against Telstar. He failed to score in 24 appearances over two seasons. In the summer of 2017, he moved to amateur club OSS '20.

In May 2023, Van Sonsbeek announced his retirement from football.
