= Barry Beijer =

Dutch footballer (born 1989)

Personal information
- Date of birth: 6 December 1989 (age 36)
- Place of birth: Duiven, Netherlands
- Height: 1.84 m (6 ft 0 in)
- Position: Centre back

Team information
- Current team: Scherpenzeel
- Number: 18

Youth career
- –2009: DVV Duiven
- 2009–2011: Vitesse/AGOVV

Senior career*
Years	Team	Apps	(Gls)
2011–2015	De Treffers	105	(3)
2015–2017	Achilles '29	61	(2)
2017–2020	Spakenburg	87	(5)
2020	DOVO	2	(0)
2021–2022	TEC	30	(1)
2022–	Scherpenzeel		
- * Club domestic league appearances and goals as of 16:15, 22 November 2024 (UTC)

Barry Beijer (born 6 December 1989) is a Dutch footballer who plays as a centre back for Scherpenzeel.

== Club career ==
He made his professional debut in the Eerste Divisie for Achilles '29 on 7 August 2015 in a game against Jong Ajax. In 2020 he left Spakenburg for fellow amateur side DOVO, only to leave them for TEC in January 2021.
