= Olaf Rompelberg =

Dutch footballer

Personal information
- Full name: Olaf Rompelberg
- Date of birth: January 30, 1987 (age 39)
- Place of birth: Heerlen, Netherlands
- Height: 1.83 m (6 ft 0 in)
- Position: Defender

Team information
- Current team: Excelsior Veldwezelt
- Number: 21

Senior career*
Years	Team	Apps	(Gls)
2005–2008	Roda JC	1	(0)
2008–	Excelsior Veldwezelt	66	(2)
- * Club domestic league appearances and goals

Olaf Rompelberg (born 30 January 1987 in Heerlen) is a Dutch footballer who currently plays for Excelsior Veldwezelt.

== Career ==
Rompelberg is a defender who made his debut in professional football, being part of the Roda JC squad in the 2005–06 season.
