= Thijs van Pol =

Dutch footballer (born 1991)

Personal information
- Date of birth: 20 June 1991 (age 35)
- Place of birth: Helmond, Netherlands
- Height: 1.85 m (6 ft 1 in)
- Position: Forward

Team information
- Current team: ASV Geel
- Number: 9

Youth career
- 1998–2002: NWC
- 2002–2006: Helmond Sport
- 2006–2007: Eindhoven
- 2007–2010: Deurne

Senior career*
Years	Team	Apps	(Gls)
2010–2013	Deurne		
2013–2014	SV Someren		
2014–2016	Gemert		
2016–2018	FC Oss	21	(3)
2018–2020	Gemert	41	(26)
2020–2021	Wezel Sport		
2021–2024	KVV Berg en Dal	14	(18)
2024–	ASV Geel	27	(17)
- * Club domestic league appearances and goals as of 16 January 2026

Thijs van Pol (born 20 June 1991) is a Dutch footballer who plays as a forward for ASV Geel.

== Club career ==
He made his professional debut in the Eerste Divisie for FC Oss on 25 November 2016 in a game against Jong FC Utrecht.

In the summer of 2021, he joined Belgian First Provincial club Berg en Dal.
