= Age Hains Boersma =

Dutch footballer (born 1982)

Personal information
- Date of birth: 12 March 1982 (age 44)
- Place of birth: Stavoren, Netherlands
- Position: Striker

Team information
- Current team: Sneek Wit Zwart

Youth career
- 2000–2003: QVC Stavoren
- 2003–2006: Sneek

Senior career*
Years	Team	Apps	(Gls)
2006–2008	Heerenveen	1	(0)
2007	→ Veendam (loan)	20	(4)
2008	Veendam	11	(2)
2008–2010	Sneek Wit Zwart		
2010–2012	Flevo Boys		
2012–2013	Harkemase Boys		
2013–2018	Sneek Wit Zwart		
- * Club domestic league appearances and goals

Age Hains Boersma (born 12 March 1982) is a Dutch retired footballer who played as a striker.

== Club career ==
Boersma started his professional career at SC Heerenveen, when he was snapped up from Sneek in 2006 and made his debut in February 2007 against Roda JC. He was loaned and later sold to Veendam during the 2007/08 season.

In summer 2008, Boersma retired from professional football to focus on a career outside the sport. He rejoined amateur side VV Sneek and later played for Flevo Boys and Harkemase Boys before returning to Sneek once more in 2013.

In March 2015 he became Sneek's all-time top goalscorer when he netted his 100th and 101st goal for the club.
