= Daan Huiskamp =

Dutch footballer (born 1985)

Personal information
- Date of birth: 10 November 1985 (age 40)
- Place of birth: Eerbeek, Netherlands
- Height: 1.83 m (6 ft 0 in)
- Position: Goalkeeper

Team information
- Current team: DVS '33
- Number: 20

Youth career
- Eerbeekse Boys
- 1998–2001: Vitesse
- 2001–2005: Utrecht

Senior career*
| Years | Team | Apps | (Gls) |
| 2005–2006 | Utrecht | 0 | (0) |
| 2006–2012 | AGOVV | 31 | (0) |
| 2012–2017 | DVS '33 | 19+ | (0) |
| 2017–2018 | Spakenburg | 1 | (0) |
| 2018–2019 | Genemuiden | ? | (?) |
| 2019–2023 | DVS '33 | 92 | (0) |
- * Club domestic league appearances and goals

Daan Huiskamp (Dutch pronunciation: [ˈdaːn ˈɦœyskɑmp]; born 10 November 1985) is a Dutch former professional footballer who played as a goalkeeper.

== Career ==
Huiskamp started playing football for several youth clubs, first Eerbeekse Boys, second Vitesse and lastly Utrecht. He entered the professional level in the 2005–06 season and played for Utrecht for one season. He later signed with second-tier club, AGOVV.

In January 2024, Huiskamp announced that he had retired from football after leaving DVS '33 at the end of the previous season. Instead, he had begun working as a goalkeeping coach at Voorwaarts Twello.

== Career statistics ==
| Season | Club | Country | Competition | Caps | Goals |
|---|---|---|---|---|---|
| 2005/06 | FC Utrecht | Netherlands | Second Division | 0 | 0 |
| 2006–07 | AGOVV Apeldoorn | Netherlands | First Division | 0 | 0 |
