= Melvin Grootfaam =

Dutch footballer (born 1990)

Personal information
- Date of birth: 20 August 1990 (age 36)
- Place of birth: Amsterdam, Netherlands
- Height: 1.82 m (6 ft 0 in)
- Position: Striker

Youth career
- SDZ
- DWS

Senior career*
| Years | Team | Apps | (Gls) |
| 2011–2013 | Telstar | 14 | (0) |
| 2013–2014 | Chabab | 27 | (7) |
| 2014–2022 | AFC | 172 | (9) |
| Total | | 213 | (16) |
- * Club domestic league appearances and goals

Melvin Grootfaam (born 20 August 1990) is a Dutch retired footballer who played as a striker. He formerly played for Telstar. of the Eerste Divisie league. He joined AFC from fellow amateur side FC Chabab in 2014. In 2026 Grootfaam moved from DWS to HBOK.
