= Daan Blij =

Dutch professional footballer

Personal information
- Full name: Daan Blij
- Date of birth: 25 September 1993 (age 33)
- Place of birth: Rotterdam, Netherlands
- Height: 1.85 m (6 ft 1 in)
- Position: Winger

Youth career
- VOC
- Sparta
- Spartaan '20
- Feyenoord

Senior career*
Years	Team	Apps	(Gls)
2012–2015	Excelsior	59	(7)
2015–2021	Excelsior Maassluis	114	(36)
2022	TEC	28	(2)
2023-2024	RVVH		
- * Club domestic league appearances and goals as of 6 January 2023

Daan Blij (born 25 September 1993) is a Dutch footballer who plays as a winger. (Note: Daan Blij at WorldFootball.net)

== Club career ==
He played professionally for Excelsior, but moved to amateur side Excelsior Maassluis in summer 2015. He joined TEC in winter 2021/22 but left the club after a year.

In summer 2023 Blij was picked up by RVVH.

He works as a youth worker in Rotterdam.
