= Marlon Versteeg =

Dutch footballer (born 1997)

Personal information
- Date of birth: 29 July 1997 (age 29)
- Place of birth: Arnhem, Netherlands
- Height: 1.83 m (6 ft 0 in)
- Position: Forward

Team information
- Current team: Bennekom

Youth career
- VV Eldenia
- 2008–2015: Vitesse
- 2015–2016: De Graafschap

Senior career*
Years	Team	Apps	(Gls)
2016–2020	De Graafschap	5	(0)
2018–2019	→ Lienden (loan)	3	(0)
2019–2020	→ Spakenburg (loan)	19	(7)
2020–2022	De Treffers	28	(3)
2022	DOVO	10	(1)
2023–	Bennekom		
- * Club domestic league appearances and goals as of 10:02, 22 February 2024 (UTC)

Marlon Versteeg (born 29 July 1997) is a Dutch footballer who plays for Bennekom.

== Club career ==
He made his professional debut in the Eerste Divisie for De Graafschap on 5 August 2016 in a game against FC Eindhoven.

After loans to FC Lienden and SV Spakenburg, Versteeg moved to second-tier Tweede Divisie club De Treffers on a permanent deal in June 2020.
