= Bilal Amarzagouio =

Dutch footballer (born 1992)

Personal information
- Date of birth: 29 November 1992 (age 33)
- Place of birth: Netherlands
- Positions: Defender; midfielder

Team information
- Current team: Al Ittihad (Salalah)

Youth career
- FC Boshuizen

Senior career*
Years	Team	Apps	(Gls)
- FC Boshuizen
2011–2012	Papendorp		
2012–2016	Sparta Nijkerk	28+	(1+)
2017	CRA		
2018	MAT		
2018–2019	ASV De Dijk	29	(3)
2019–2020	OFC	20	(2)
2021–	Al Ittihad (Salalah)		
- * Club domestic league appearances and goals

Bilal Amarzagouio (born 29 November 1992) is a Dutch professional footballer who plays as a defender or midfielder for Al Ittihad (Salalah).

== Career ==
Amarzagouio started his career with Dutch ninth division side FC Boshuizen. In 2011, he signed for Papendorp in the Dutch seventh division. In 2012, Amarzagouio signed for Dutch fifth division club Sparta Nijkerk, helping them achieve promotion to the Dutch fourth division. Before the 2017 season, he signed for CRA in Morocco, where he said, “A Spanish trainer came with a completely different vision. He preferred to make money from other players, we were told that by the board. It was one of the reasons I stopped playing. I was allowed to play in the cup every now and then. The worst part is that you don't get a chance at all." In 2018, Amarzagouio signed for Dutch fourth division team ASV De Dijk. Before the second half of 2020–21, he signed for Al Ittihad (Salalah) in Oman.
