= DVS '33 =

Dutch football club

SV DVS '33 Ermelo
- Full name: Sportvereniging Door Vereniging Sterk 1933 Ermelo
- Founded: 1 September 1933; 93 years ago
- Ground: Sportpark Zuid, Ermelo, Netherlands
- Capacity: 1,000
- Chairman: Aart Goossensen
- Manager: John Kamphuis
- League: Derde Divisie
- 2025–26: Derde Divisie A, 3rd of 18
- Website: http://www.dvs33.nl/
Home colours	Away colours

DVS '33 Ermelo (Door Vereniging Sterk, English: Strong Through Unity) is a Dutch amateur football club from Ermelo, founded 1 September 1933. The club currently competes in the Derde Divisie, the fourth tier of league football in the Netherlands.

The club evolved out of the merger of two football clubs from Ermelo, namely Ajax Ermelo and EFC. It is the largest and most successful club from Ermelo. Some of the club's youth teams compete at the national level, for example against youth teams of Ajax and Vitesse Arnhem. In 2007 DVS '33 was one of three clubs to be nominated for the Amateur football club of the year.

In 2015 DVS '33 were promoted to the Topklasse, the third tier of league football in the Netherlands. On 22 August 2015 they played their first match in Topklasse, a 3–3 draw against Excelsior Maassluis.

== Current squad ==
As of 23 March 2020

Note: Flags indicate national team as defined under FIFA eligibility rules; some limited exceptions apply. Players may hold more than one non-FIFA nationality.

No.	Pos.	Nation	Player
1	GK	NED	Thodorie Velanas
2	DF	NED	Enrico Patrick
5	DF	NED	Jeremy Jonker
6	MF	NED	Soufian Moro
7	MF	NED	Christiaan van Hussen
8	MF	NED	Coen Vloedgraven
9	FW	NED	Olivier Pilon
10	MF	NED	Daniël van Warven
11	FW	NED	Benjamin Roemeon
12	MF	NED	Lars Dekker
14	MF	NED	Oktay Öztürk

No.	Pos.	Nation	Player
15	FW	NED	Anass Ghaddari
16	DF	NED	Frank van der Burg
17	DF	NED	Roald de Vries
18	DF	NED	Mark Bouwman
19	FW	NED	Joshua Patrick
20	GK	NED	Daan Huiskamp
21	FW	NED	Julian de Ruiter
22	DF	NED	Giovanny Leibbrand
23	GK	NED	Melvin van den Beeten
24	DF	NED	Thierry van den Bergh
38	FW	NED	Rafael Uiterloo
