= Rick Geenen =

Dutch footballer

Personal information
- Full name: Rick Leon Willem Geenen
- Date of birth: August 13, 1988 (age 38)
- Place of birth: Geleen, Netherlands
- Height: 1.80 m (5 ft 11 in)
- Position: Centre back

Youth career
- –2000: RKFC Lindenheuvel
- 2000–2007: Fortuna Sittard

Senior career*
| Years | Team | Apps | (Gls) |
| 2007–2012 | Fortuna Sittard | 143 | (14) |
| 2012–2013 | Hansa Rostock | 7 | (0) |
| 2013–2014 | MVV | 16 | (0) |
| 2014–2024 | EVV | 241 | (14+) |
- * Club domestic league appearances and goals as of 20 September 2024

Rick Leon Willem Geenen (born 13 August 1988) is a Dutch retired footballer who played as a centre back.

== Career ==
He started at local amateur side Lindenheuvel, then joined and played professionally for Fortuna Sittard, Hansa Rostock and MVV Maastricht and for EVV in the Dutch Vierde Divisie. In September 2024, Geenen announced his immediate retirement.
