= Darren Maatsen =

Dutch footballer (born 1991)

Personal information
- Date of birth: 30 January 1991 (age 35)
- Place of birth: Vlaardingen, Netherlands
- Height: 1.85 m (6 ft 1 in)
- Position: Winger

Team information
- Current team: Excelsior Maassluis
- Number: 10

Youth career
- VV HVO
- Dordrecht
- Excelsior Maassluis

Senior career*
Years	Team	Apps	(Gls)
2011–2013	Excelsior	52	(5)
2013–2015	Ross County	18	(3)
2015	Den Bosch	16	(2)
2015	Ayia Napa	8	(1)
2016–2017	Go Ahead Eagles	42	(7)
2017–2018	Apollon Smyrnis	9	(0)
2018–2020	RKC Waalwijk	51	(12)
2020–2021	Stabæk	18	(3)
2021	NAC Breda	7	(0)
2021–2022	Quick Boys	27	(8)
2022–2024	AFC	18	(0)
2024–	Excelsior Maassluis	17	(2)
- * Club domestic league appearances and goals as of 22:17, 15 October 2024 (UTC)

Darren Maatsen (born 30 January 1991) is a Dutch professional footballer who plays as a winger for Excelsior Maassluis.

== Career ==
Maatsen started playing football in his youth career at VV HVO, FC Dordrecht and Excelsior Maassluis.

=== SBV Excelsior ===
Maatsen joined Excelsior in 2011, starting his professional football career. Maatsen made his début, in the opening game of the season, when he came on as a substitute in the 72nd minute in a 2–0 loss against Feyenoord. In numbers of games, he mostly came on the bench as a substitute. In a match against Twente, on 2 October 2011, Maatsen came on as a substitute in the 82nd minute and with eight minutes remaining until full-time, he scored twice to make a comeback in a 2–2 draw. Later in the 2011–12 season, Maatsen scored three more goals against Ajax, NAC Breda and VVV-Venlo, to add a tally to his Excelsior career, but the club was relegated to Eerste Divisie, having finished eighteenth place with nineteenth points. Despite the relegation, his performance attracted interests from Polish side Lech Poznań.

In the 2012–13 season, Maatsen started to play on the right-wing mostly, though sometimes on the left, or even as a striker, making twenty-eight appearances in all competitions.

=== Ross County ===
Maatsen signed for Scottish Premiership club Ross County on 21 June 2013.

After just three minutes of the opening match of the season, away to Celtic, he scored with a powerful shot from the edge of the penalty area that went in off the crossbar with goalkeeper Fraser Forster well beaten; Ross County lost 2–1. It was awarded "goal of the week" by The Terrace Scottish Football Podcast. However, Mattsen's first team opportunities was soon limited and made only made ten appearances after suffering an ankle injury that kept him out for most of the season.

The 2014–15 season saw Maatsen's playing time continued to be reduced, even though he scored two goals this season against Dundee and Dundee United. By the time he made seven appearances and scored two times. He was released by Ross County on 2 February 2015.

=== After Ross County ===
Maatsen signed with Dutch Eerste Divisie side FC Den Bosch on the same day. Six days later, on 9 February 2015, he made his Den Bosch debut, coming on as a substitute for Jort van der Sande in the 83rd minute, in a 2–0 win over Emmen. Maatsen scored four days later after his debut, in a 5–1 win over Helmond Sport. In the last game of the season, he scored in a 3–3 draw against Almere City. Maatsen made sixteen appearances and scoring twice in his half season at Den Bosch.

On 20 July 2017, Maatsen signed a contract with the recently promoted club of Apollon Smyrnis. At his interview after his transfer, he stated that he considered the transfer a big step in his career.

On 23 August 2021, he joined Quick Boys.

== Personal ==
His brother is professional footballer Dalian Maatsen. Maatsen is of Surinamese descent.
