= Peter de Lange (footballer) =

Dutch footballer

Peter de Lange (23 March 1988) is a retired Dutch association football player in the forward position. He is a resident of Rotterdam.

== Club career ==
De Lange played in Barendrecht, Willem II, Excelsior Rotterdam, Barendrecht, VV Capelle, and Spakenburg.

From 2016 to 2018 he played in ASWH in the Derde Divisie. In his first season at ASWH he was its top scorer and third overall scorer in the Derde Divisie (after leading the ranks into winter break). He continued to VV Spijkenisse and to BVV Barendrecht for a second run.
