= 2022–23 Tweede Divisie =

Tweede Divisie
- Season: 2022–23
- Dates: 20 August 2022 – 27 May 2023
- Champions: Katwijk
- Relegated: TEC; IJsselmeervogels; Jong Volendam
- Matches: 306
- Goals: 978 (3.2 per match)
- Top goalscorer: Youssef El Kachati (24 goals)
- Biggest home win: Katwijk 7–0 Jong Volendam (20 August 2022); HHC Hardenberg 7–0 TEC (10 April 2023)
- Biggest away win: OFC 0–6 Jong Sparta (5 March 2023)
- Highest scoring: Kozakken Boys 5–5 Spakenburg (3 September 2022)

The 2022–23 Tweede Divisie season, known as Jack's League for sponsorship reasons, was the seventh edition of the Dutch third tier since ending its hiatus since the 1970-71 season and the 22nd edition using the Tweede Divisie name.

== Teams ==
Location of teams in the Tweede Divisie 2022-23
South Holland clubs in the 2022–23 Tweede Divisie

Club	Location	Venue	Capacity
AFC	Amsterdam	Sportpark Goed Genoeg	3,000
Excelsior Maassluis	Maassluis	Sportpark Dijkpolder	5,000
HHC	Hardenberg	Sportpark De Boshoek	4,500
Koninklijke HFC	Haarlem	Sportpark Spanjaardslaan	1,500
IJsselmeervogels	Spakenburg	Sportpark De Westmaat	6,000
Jong Sparta	Rotterdam	Het Kasteel	11,000
Jong Volendam	Volendam	Kras Stadion	7,384
Katwijk	Katwijk	Sportpark De Krom	6,000
Kozakken Boys	Werkendam	Sportpark De Zwaaier	3,000
Lisse	Lisse	Sportpark Ter Specke	7,000
Noordwijk	Noordwijk	Sportpark Duin Wetering	3,500
OFC	Oostzaan	Sportpark OFC	1,500
Quick Boys	Katwijk aan Zee	Sportpark Nieuw Zuid	8,100
Rijnsburgse Boys	Rijnsburg	Sportpark Middelmors	6,100
Scheveningen	Scheveningen	Sportpark Houtrust	3,500
Spakenburg	Spakenburg	Sportpark De Westmaat	8,500
TEC	Tiel	Sportpark De Lok	2,500
De Treffers	Groesbeek	Sportpark Zuid	4,000

=== Number of teams by province ===
Number of teams	Province	Team(s)
8	South Holland	Excelsior Maassluis, Jong Sparta, Katwijk, Lisse, Noordwijk, Quick Boys, Rijnsburgse Boys, Scheveningen
4	North Holland	AFC, Koninklijke HFC, Jong Volendam, OFC
2	Gelderland	TEC, De Treffers
2	Utrecht	IJsselmeervogels, Spakenburg
1	North Brabant	Kozakken Boys
1	Overijssel	HHC

== Standings ==
Pos	Team	Pld	W	D	L	GF	GA	GD	Pts	Qualification or relegation
1	Katwijk (C)	34	22	5	7	74	36	+38	71	
2	Rijnsburgse Boys	34	21	6	7	73	42	+31	69	
3	AFC	34	20	9	5	60	31	+29	69	
4	HHC Hardenberg	34	18	6	10	75	48	+27	60	
5	De Treffers	34	18	6	10	66	45	+21	60	
6	Quick Boys	34	17	5	12	72	48	+24	56	
7	Koninklijke HFC	34	16	7	11	52	41	+11	55	
8	Scheveningen	34	12	9	13	38	46	−8	45	
9	Noordwijk	34	12	7	15	45	45	0	43	
10	Jong Sparta	34	12	7	15	58	61	−3	43	
11	Spakenburg	34	11	10	13	50	55	−5	43	
12	Lisse	34	10	12	12	45	51	−6	42	
13	Kozakken Boys	34	12	4	18	50	58	−8	40	
14	Excelsior Maassluis	34	10	9	15	50	69	−19	39	
15	TEC (R)	34	10	9	15	41	60	−19	39	Qualification for relegation play-offs
16	IJsselmeervogels (R)	34	9	6	19	51	71	−20	33	Qualification for relegation play-offs
17	Jong Volendam (R)	34	7	5	22	45	82	−37	26	Relegation to Under-21 division
18	OFC (R)	34	4	8	22	33	89	−56	20	Withdrawn

Source: Flashscore
Rules for classification: Season in progress: 1) Most points won; 2) Less points lost; 3) Goal difference; 4) Goals scored; 5) Alphabetical order; End of season: 1) Points; 2) Goal difference; 3) Goals scored; 4) Head-to-head points; 5) Head-to-head goal difference; 6) Head-to-head away goals scored; 7) Play-off if relevant for deciding champion, relegation or participating in a European league, otherwise by draw. 8) Penalty shoot-out (only after a play-off)
(C) Champions; (R) Relegated

== Fixtures/results ==
Home \ Away	AFC	EXM	HHC	HFC	IJS	JSP	JVO	KAT	KOZ	LIS	NOO	OFC	QUI	RIJ	SCH	SPA	TEC	TRE
AFC		0–0	1–1	1–4	3–0	2–1	5–1	1–0	1–0	3–2	1–1	3–3	1–0	2–0	4–1	1–2	2–1	2–0
Excelsior Maassluis	1–4		2–2	0–0	2–2	3–2	4–2	3–2	0–1	0–1	2–1	3–1	0–2	3–1	3–4	0–2	3–0	0–2
HHC Hardenberg	0–0	3–0		2–1	2–0	1–3	0–3	0–1	2–1	4–2	1–0	0–2	4–0	1–6	3–1	2–0	7–0	3–1
Koninklijke HFC	0–0	2–1	2–0		2–0	1–0	2–1	1–3	3–1	1–0	0–1	4–0	1–1	1–2	1–0	2–1	1–1	0–4
IJsselmeervogels	0–2	2–3	1–0	2–3		3–3	0–1	0–0	2–1	4–1	0–2	3–2	4–3	0–3	1–5	4–1	1–2	1–3
Jong Sparta	2–3	3–3	1–4	1–0	1–3		1–1	5–3	2–1	1–1	0–3	6–0	1–0	0–3	1–0	3–1	3–3	3–1
Jong Volendam	0–1	2–2	2–6	1–0	3–3	2–1		0–1	0–1	2–2	0–2	2–0	1–4	4–3	0–1	1–3	1–2	1–3
Katwijk	3–1	6–2	2–1	1–1	4–0	3–1	7–0		1–0	0–1	2–1	5–0	3–0	2–2	1–0	2–1	2–0	0–0
Kozakken Boys	1–0	3–0	1–4	2–3	1–4	4–1	2–0	3–1		1–2	2–3	2–0	0–1	0–1	0–0	5–5	4–1	3–1
Lisse	0–0	1–1	2–2	2–1	3–2	2–0	2–4	0–2	4–0		0–0	2–1	0–0	2–3	1–1	2–2	4–0	0–2
Noordwijk	1–3	1–1	0–3	2–1	2–0	3–0	3–2	1–1	1–3	1–2		3–0	2–1	1–1	0–2	3–3	0–1	1–2
OFC	1–1	3–1	1–5	2–1	0–3	0–6	3–1	1–3	2–4	0–0	1–2		1–2	2–3	1–1	0–2	2–2	1–1
Quick Boys	1–3	7–2	1–1	1–1	2–1	3–0	4–2	1–3	4–0	3–1	2–1	2–0		4–0	2–3	4–2	1–2	0–2
Rijnsburgse Boys	0–2	4–1	2–1	2–3	4–1	2–2	1–0	4–0	2–0	4–1	3–2	3–0	3–3		0–0	1–0	0–1	3–0
Scheveningen	0–2	0–1	0–2	0–4	2–0	0–0	2–1	1–3	2–1	2–0	1–1	1–1	0–5	1–2		1–1	1–0	1–2
Spakenburg	0–2	0–1	4–4	1–0	1–1	0–1	3–1	2–1	1–1	3–1	1–0	1–1	0–4	1–1	0–1		0–3	2–0
TEC	2–2	2–1	0–2	2–2	2–2	1–0	2–2	0–3	1–1	0–0	2–0	4–0	1–3	0–1	1–2	0–3		1–2
De Treffers	2–1	1–1	5–2	2–3	2–1	1–3	6–1	2–3	3–0	1–1	1–0	7–1	2–1	1–2	1–1	1–1	2–1	

Source: Flashscore
Legend: Blue = home team win; Yellow = draw; Red = away team win.

== Play-offs ==
=== Tweede divisie promotion/relegation play-offs ===
All times Central European Summer Time (UTC+2)

==== Bracket ====
Quarterfinals
GVVV	2	4	6
Groene Ster	0	0	0
IJsselmeervogels	0	0	0
Hercules	6	5	11
VVSB	0	5	5
DOVO	1	2	3
TEC	1	0	1
SteDoCo	4	2	6

Semifinals
GVVV	0	3	3
Hercules	1	0	1
VVSB	0	2	2
SteDoCo	1	2	3

Final
GVVV	2	2	4
SteDoCo	1	0	1

==== Quarterfinals ====
7 June 2023
20:00

SteDoCo	4–1	TEC

Sportpark SteDoCo, Hoornaar
10 June 2023
18:00

TEC	0–2	SteDoCo

Sportpark De Lok, Tiel

SteDoCo won 6–1 on aggregate.

31 May 2023
20:00

DOVO	1–0	VVSB
Pluk 4'	Report

Sportpark Panhuis, Veenendaal
3 June 2023
18:00

VVSB	5–2	DOVO

Sportpark De Boekhorst, Noordwijkerhout

VVSB won 5–3 on aggregate.

31 May 2023
20:00

Hercules	6–0	IJsselmeervogels
van de Groep 26' (o.g.); Waterink 32' van Rooijen 47'; Pieters 75', 83'; Vermeulen 89'	Report

Sportpark Voordorp, Utrecht
3 June 2023
18:00

IJsselmeervogels	0–5	Hercules
		Waterink 8', 41'; Lahri 52'; Pieters 61'; Vermeulen 71'

Sportpark De Westmaat, Spakenburg

Hercules won 11–0 on aggregate.

31 May 2023
20:00

Groene Ster	0–2	GVVV
	Report	Veenhof 50'; Burgering 62' (pen.)

Pronsebroek, Heerlerheide
3 June 2023
18:00

GVVV	4–0	Groene Ster

Sportpark Panhuis, Veenendaal

GVVV won 6–0 on aggregate.

==== Semifinals ====
14 June 2023

SteDoCo	1–0	VVSB

Sportpark SteDoCo, Hoornaar
17 June 2023
15:30

VVSB	2–2	SteDoCo

Sportpark De Boekhorst, Noordwijkerhout

SteDoCo won 3–2 on aggregate.

10 June 2023
18:00

Hercules	1–0	GVVV

Sportpark Voordorp, Utrecht
17 June 2023
18:00

GVVV	3–0	Hercules

Sportpark Panhuis, Veenendaal

GVVV won 3–1 on aggregate.

==== Final ====
21 June 2023
20:00

SteDoCo	1–2	GVVV

Sportpark SteDoCo, Hoornaar
24 June 2023
18:00

GVVV	2–0	SteDoCo

Sportpark Panhuis, Veenendaal

== Top scorers ==
As of 27 May 2023

Rank	Player	Club	Goals
1	(Netherlands) Youssef El Kachati	Quick Boys	24
2	(Netherlands) Furghill Zeldenrust	Rijnsburgse Boys	20
3	(Netherlands) Ahmed El Azzouti	Katwijk	19
4	(Netherlands) Bo van Essen	TEC	18
5	(Netherlands) Pieter Langedijk	Excelsior Maassluis	17
5	(Netherlands) Zakaria Eddahchouri	Koninklijke HFC	17
5	(Netherlands) Matthijs Hardijk	HHC Hardenberg	17
8	(Netherlands) Rob van der Leij	HHC Hardenberg	16
9	(Netherlands) Emiel Wendt	Noordwijk	15
9	(Netherlands) Dani van der Moot	Rijnsburgse Boys	15
