= VV Katwijk =

Dutch football club

- Full name: Voetbal Vereniging Katwijk
- Founded: 17 February 1939; 87 years ago
- Ground: Sportpark De Krom; Katwijk, Netherlands
- Capacity: 6,000
- Chairman: Klaas Damsma
- Manager: Luigi Bruins
- League: Tweede Divisie
- 2025–26: Tweede Divisie, 7th of 18
Home colours

Voetbal Vereniging Katwijk (Dutch pronunciation: [ˈkɑtʋɛik]) is a Dutch association football club based in the town of Katwijk. Founded in 1939, the team competes in the Tweede Divisie, the third tier of the Dutch football league system. Katwijk plays its home games at Sportpark De Krom, which has a capacity of 6,000.

Katwijk is one of the most successful amateur football clubs in the Netherlands in recent decades, winning seven championships of the top amateur division of the Netherlands between 1993 and 2023.

== History ==
Katwijk have become Dutch amateur champions, by winning the overall Topklasse title in 2012–13. As such, they were invited to play in the Dutch Eerste Divisie but, after some consideration, the club opted to stay in the Topklasse, claiming the organisation was not yet ready to compete in the Eerste Divisie. Topklasse runners-up Achilles '29 were ultimately admitted in their place instead.

In the following season, Katwijk failed to repeat its success, and ended the season with being relegated to the Hoofdklasse.

Arch rival is Quick Boys, from the same town.

=== Head coach ===
- Dick Schreuder (2014–2018)
- Jack van den Berg (2018)
- Jan Zoutman (2018–2020)
- Anthony Correia (since 2020)

== Honours ==
- Tweede Divisie: 3

2017–18, 2021–22, 2022–23

- Topklasse: 1

2012–13

- Hoofdklasse title: 5

1992–93, 1993–94, 1994–95, 1999–2000, 2014–15

- National Saturday Amateur title: 4

1992–93, 1993–94, 1999–2000, 2012–13

- National amateur football title: 4

1992–93, 1993–94 1999–00, 2012–13

== Players ==
=== First-team squad ===
As of 19 October 2026

Note: Flags indicate national team as defined under FIFA eligibility rules; some limited exceptions apply. Players may hold more than one non-FIFA nationality.

No.	Pos.	Nation	Player
1	GK	NED	Mitchel Michaelis
2	DF	NED	Victor van den Bogert (captain)
4	DF	NED	Dalian Maatsen
5	DF	NED	Django Warmerdam
6	MF	NED	Rick van der Meer
7	FW	NED	Giovanni Korte
8	MF	NED	Finn Janmaat
9	FW	NED	Mike van Duinen
10	FW	SOM	Mukhtar Suleiman
11	FW	NED	Matthijs Jesse
14	DF	NED	Kaj van der Veldt
15	DF	NED	Bart Sinteur

No.	Pos.	Nation	Player
16	MF	NED	Dylan van Wageningen
17	MF	NED	Gianni Tiebosch
18	FW	NED	Angelo Kamperveen
19	MF	NED	Dan Schallenberg
20	MF	NED	Owen van der Meer
21	DF	NED	Levi Bouwense
22	MF	NED	Maurizio Brenna
23	FW	NED	Wessel Been
24	FW	MAR	Ilyas el Moussaoui
25	DF	NED	Cheick Touré
26	DF	NED	Justin Bakker
41	GK	NED	Stan van Bladeren
