= 2018–19 SC Telstar season =

SC Telstar
2018–19 season
- Stadium: Sportpark Schoonenberg
- Eerste Divisie: 15th
- KNVB Cup: 1st round
- Top goalscorer: League: Terell Ondaan (13 goals); All: Terell Ondaan (13 goals)
- Highest home attendance: 3,263 (6th week)
- Lowest home attendance: 1,612 (18th week)
- Average home league attendance: 2,134
- Biggest win: 4-1 (FC Dordrecht (a) 4th week)
- Biggest defeat: 5-0 (Amsterdamsche FC (a) KNVB 1st round)
- All statistics correct as of 3 May 2019.

The 2018–19 season was SC Telstar's 56th season since the club's establishment.

SC Telstar made their 42nd appearance in the Eerste Divisie during the 2018–19 season, marking their 41st successive campaign in the second tier of Dutch football.

In addition to their league commitments, the club took part in the KNVB Cup, where they were eliminated in the opening round after suffering a 5–0 defeat against Amsterdamsche FC.

SC Telstar concluded their Eerste Divisie campaign in 15th place.

Terell Ondaan was the club's leading goalscorer, netting 13 goals in the Eerste Divisie throughout the season.

Rodny Lopes Cabral recorded the most league appearances for SC Telstar, featuring in 35 Eerste Divisie matches.

== Players ==
=== First-team squad ===
As of 29 March 2019

Note: Flags indicate national team as defined under FIFA eligibility rules; some limited exceptions apply. Players may hold more than one non-FIFA nationality.

No.	Pos.	Nation	Player
1	GK	NED	Jeroen Houwen
2	DF	NED	Rodny Lopes Cabral
3	DF	NED	Donny van Iperen
4	DF	NED	Jasper van Heertum
5	DF	CPV	Elso Brito
6	DF	NED	Frank Korpershoek
7	MF	NED	Dylan Mertens
8	MF	BEL	Senne Lynen
9	FW	ENG	Ryan Seager
9	FW	SUI	Karim Rossi
10	FW	GBS	Ahmad Mendes Moreira
10	MF	USA	Kyle Scott
11	DF	NED	Shaquill Sno
14	MF	NED	Danny van Haaren

No.	Pos.	Nation	Player
15	MF	NED	Anass Najah
17	FW	GUY	Terell Ondaan
18	MF	NED	Darren Rosheuvel
19	FW	NED	Jordie van der Laan
20	GK	NED	Wesley Zonneveld
21	DF	NED	Toine van Huizen
23	DF	NED	Kick Groot
25	GK	NED	Sven van der Maaten
29	MF	NED	Sven van Doorm
30	DF	NED	Melle Springer
32	FW	ARG	Facundo Lescano
33	FW	NED	Elvio van Overbeek
34	FW	NED	Adham El Idrissi

== Transfers ==
=== In ===
Pos.	Player	Transferred from	Fee	Date
MF	(Netherlands) Danny van Haaren	(Netherlands) Jong Cambuur	Free	1 July 2018
MF	(Netherlands) Darren Rosheuvel	(Netherlands) SC Cambuur	Free	1 July 2018
MF	(Netherlands) Dylan Mertens	(Netherlands) FC Volendam	Free	1 July 2018
DF	(Netherlands) Ilias Bronkhorst	(Netherlands) Koninklijke HFC	Free	1 July 2018
DF	(Netherlands) Kick Groot	(Netherlands) Jong AZ	Free	1 July 2018
DF	(Netherlands) Melle Springer	(Netherlands) Jong AZ	Free	1 July 2018
MF	(Netherlands) Sven van Doorm	(Netherlands) Jong Vitesse	On loan	1 July 2018
MF	(United States) Kyle Scott	(England) Chelsea U23	On loan	14 July 2018
FW	(Netherlands) Jordie van der Laan	(Netherlands) VV DOVO		13 August 2018
FW	(Argentina) Facundo Lescano	(Italy) Parma Calcio 1913	On loan	14 August 2018
FW	(Netherlands) Adham El Idrissi	(Netherlands) ASV De Dijk	Free	23 August 2018
GK	(Netherlands) Jeroen Houwen	(Netherlands) SBV Vitesse	On loan	27 August 2018
FW	(Guyana) Terell Ondaan	No club		11 October 2018
FW	(Guinea-Bissau) Ahmad Mendes Moreira	(Netherlands) FC Groningen	On loan	21 January 2019
FW	(Switzerland) Karim Rossi	(Netherlands) SC Cambuur	Free	31 January 2019
FW	(Netherlands) Elvio van Overbeek	No club		7 February 2019

=== Out ===
Pos.	Player	Transferred to	Fee	Date
FW	(United States) Andrija Novakovich	(England) Reading F.C.	End of loan	30 June 2018
MF	(Netherlands) Edo Knol	(Netherlands) Rijnsburgse Boys	Free	1 July 2018
MF	(Netherlands) Jerdy Schouten	(Netherlands) Excelsior Rotterdam	€300,000	1 July 2018
FW	(Brazil) Júnior	No club		1 July 2018
MF	(Somalia) Liban Abdulahi	(Netherlands) De Graafschap	Free	1 July 2018
FW	(Netherlands) Melvin Platje	(Indonesia) Bali United F.C.	Free	1 July 2018
FW	(Netherlands) Mohamed Hamdaoui	(Netherlands) De Graafschap	Free	1 July 2018
FW	(Morocco) Oussama Zamouri	(Netherlands) FC Dordrecht	Free	1 July 2018
FW	(Argentina) Facundo Lescano	(Italy) Parma Calcio 1913	End of loan	7 December 2018
FW	(Netherlands) Floris van der Linden	(Netherlands) Koninklijke HFC	Free	30 August 2018
MF	(United States) Kyle Scott	(England) Chelsea U23	End of loan	31 December 2018
FW	(England) Ryan Seager	(England) Southampton F.C.	End of loan	7 January 2019
GK	(Netherlands) Jeroen Houwen	(Netherlands) SBV Vitesse	End of loan	23 January 2019
DF	(France) Joakim Balmy	(Bulgaria) PFC Cherno More Varna	Free	27 February 2019
MF	(Ghana) Shadrach Eghan	(Netherlands) Go Ahead Eagles	End of loan	29 March 2019
FW	(Netherlands) Jordie van der Laan	No club		6 May 2019

== Competitions ==
=== Overall record ===
Competition	First match	Last match	Starting round	Final position	Record							
Competition	First match	Last match	Starting round	Final position	Pld	W	D	L	GF	GA	GD	Win %
Eredivisie	17 August 2018	3 May 2019	Week 1	15th	38	14	6	18	45	58	−13	36.84
KNVB Cup	25 September 2018	25 September 2018	1st round	1st round	1	0	0	1	0	5	−5	0.00
Total					39	14	6	19	45	63	−18	35.90

Source: ESPN

=== Eerste Divisie ===
==== League table ====
Pos	Team	Pld	W	D	L	GF	GA	GD	Pts
13	Roda JC Kerkrade	38	14	11	13	57	59	−2	53
14	Eindhoven	38	13	9	16	52	48	+4	48
15	Telstar	38	14	6	18	45	58	−13	48
16	Volendam	38	9	14	15	46	62	−16	41
17	Dordrecht	38	9	9	20	54	84	−30	36

Source: Soccerway, Keuken Kampioen Divisie (in Dutch)
Rules for classification: Season in progress: 1) Most points won; 2) Less points lost; 3) Goal difference; 4) Goals scored; 5) Alphabetical order. End of season: 1) Points; 2) Goal difference; 3) Goals scored; 4) Head-to-head points; 5) Head-to-head goal difference; 6) Head-to-head away goals scored; 7) Play-off if relevant for deciding champion, relegation, international competitions and play-offs qualification, otherwise by draw. 8) Penalty shoot-out (only after a play-off)

==== Results summary ====
Overall								Home						Away					
Pld	W	D	L	GF	GA	GD	Pts	W	D	L	GF	GA	GD	W	D	L	GF	GA	GD
38	14	6	18	45	58	−13	48	7	5	7	24	28	−4	7	1	11	21	30	−9

Last updated: 3 May 2019.
Source: https://www.espn.nl/voetbal/team/scorebord/_/id/3735/season/2019/

==== Results by round ====
Round	1	2	3	4	5	6	7	8	9	10	11	12	13	14	15	16	17	18	19	20	21	22	23	24	25	26	27	28	29	30	31	32	33	34	35	36	37	38
Ground	A	H	H	A	A	H	H	A	A	H	A	H	A	H	A	H	A	H	A	H	A	H	A	H	A	H	A	H	H	A	H	A	H	A	A	H	H	A
Result	L	L	W	W	L	L	W	L	W	L	L	W	W	L	L	D	W	L	L	D	D	D	L	L	L	L	W	W	W	W	D	W	W	L	L	W	D	L
Position																																						15

A = Away; H = Home; W = Win; D = Draw; L = Loss

=== Matches ===
==== 1st half ====
17 August 2018 1st week	RKC Waalwijk	1–0	SC Telstar	Waalwijk
20:00	Emil Hansson 25'	Report		Stadium: Mandemakers Stadion; Attendance: 2,448

24 August 2018 2nd week	SC Telstar	0–1	MVV Maastricht	Velsen-Zuid
20:00		Report	Joeri Schroyen 74'	Stadium: Sportpark Schoonenberg; Attendance: 2,114

31 August 2018 3rd week	SC Telstar	2–0	Jong FC Utrecht	Velsen-Zuid
20:00	Facundo Lescano 79' (pen.); Toine van Huizen 84'	Report		Stadium: Sportpark Schoonenberg; Attendance: 1,870

7 September 2018 4th week	FC Dordrecht	1–4	SC Telstar	Dordrecht
20:00	Marko Maletic 22'	Report	Antonio Stankov 14' (o.g.); Ryan Seager 47' 77'; Facundo Lescano 82'	Stadium: Stadion Krommedijk; Attendance: 1,532

14 September 2018 5th week	SC Cambuur	2–0	SC Telstar	Leeuwarden
20:00	Kevin van Kippersluis 21'; Justin Mathieu 76'	Report		Stadium: Cambuur Stadion; Attendance: 7,362

21 September 2018 6th week	SC Telstar	1–3	Jong FC Utrecht	Velsen-Zuid
20:00	Shaquill Sno 5'	Report	Tom Boere 9'; Jari Oosterwijk 77'; Rafik Zekhnini 90+1'	Stadium: Sportpark Schoonenberg; Attendance: 3,263

28 September 2018 7th week	SC Telstar	1–0	TOP Oss	Velsen-Zuid
20:00	Rodny Lopes Cabral 26'	Report		Stadium: Sportpark Schoonenberg; Attendance: 1,845

5 October 2018 8th week	Jong Ajax	3–0	SC Telstar	Duivendrecht, Amsterdam
20:00	Donny van Iperen 51' (o.g.); Danilo 64'; Dennis Johnsen 79'	Report		Stadium: Sportpark De Toekomst; Attendance: 887

12 October 2018 9th week	Helmond Sport	1–2	SC Telstar	Helmond
20:00	Bart Meijers 88'	Report	Kyle Scott 70' (pen.); Anass Najah 84'	Stadium: Stadion De Braak; Attendance: 1,833

19 October 2018 10th week	SC Telstar	0–3	NEC Nijmegen	Velsen-Zuid
20:00		Report	Jonathan Okita 5'; Sven Braken 72' (pen.) 79'	Stadium: Sportpark Schoonenberg; Attendance: 2,663

26 October 2018 11th week	Sparta Rotterdam	3–2	SC Telstar	Rotterdam
20:00	Lars Veldwijk 23' 26'; Halil Dervişoğlu 81'	Report	Terell Ondaan 54'; Dylan Mertens 65'	Stadium: Sparta Stadion Het Kasteel; Attendance: 9,731

4 November 2018 12th week	SC Telstar	2–1	Go Ahead Eagles	Velsen-Zuid
14:30	Kyle Scott 67'; Melle Springer 79'	Report	Thomas Verheydt 76'	Stadium: Sportpark Schoonenberg; Attendance: 2,789

9 November 2018 13th week	FC Eindhoven	1–2	SC Telstar	Eindhoven
20:00	Alvin Daniels 19'	Report	Jasper van Heertum 10' 45+2'	Stadium: Jan Louwers Stadion; Attendance: 2,008

18 November 2018 14th week	SC Telstar	1–4	FC Den Bosch	Velsen-Zuid
14:30	Frank Korpershoek 21'	Report	Danny Holla 8'; Leo Väisänen 47'; Jort van der Sande 78'; Danny Verbeek 90+1'	Stadium: Sportpark Schoonenberg; Attendance: 1,763

23 November 2018 15th week	Roda JC Kerkrade	3–0	SC Telstar	Kerkrade
20:00	Mario Engels 38' 44' (pen.); Mitchell Paulissen 57'	Report		Stadium: Parkstad Limburg Stadion; Attendance: 6,192

30 November 2018 16th week	SC Telstar	1–1	Almere City FC	Velsen-Zuid
20:00	Terell Ondaan 53'	Report	Andreias Calcan 85'	Stadium: Sportpark Schoonenberg; Attendance: 1,936

10 December 2018 17th week	Jong AZ	0–2	SC Telstar	The Hague
20:00		Report	Terell Ondaan 6' 64'	Stadium: AFAS Trainingscomplex; Attendance: 750

14 December 2018 18th week	SC Telstar	2–4	Jong PSV	Velsen-Zuid
20:00	Senne Lynen 34'; Terell Ondaan 58' (pen.)	Report	Matthias Verreth 9'; Jordan Teze 22'; Marlon Frey 88'; Ramon Pascal Lundqvist 90'	Stadium: Sportpark Schoonenberg; Attendance: 1,612

21 December 2018 19th week	FC Volendam	1–0	SC Telstar	Volendam
20:00	Nick Doodeman 43'	Report		Stadium: Kras Stadion; Attendance: 2,954

==== 2nd half ====
13 January 2018 20th week	SC Telstar	1–1	Helmond Sport	Velsen-Zuid
14:30	Senne Lynen 90'	Report	Richelor Sprangers 21'	Stadium: Sportpark Schoonenberg; Attendance: 1,760

18 January 2019 21st week	NEC Nijmegen	1–1	SC Telstar	Nijmegen
20:00	Kick Groot 9' (o.g.)	Report	Anass Najah 32'	Stadium: Goffertstadion; Attendance: 7,342

25 January 2018 22nd week	SC Telstar	1–1	Sparta Rotterdam	Velsen-Zuid
20:00	Senne Lynen 15'	Report	Royston Drenthe 19'	Stadium: Sportpark Schoonenberg; Attendance: 2,263

1 February 2019 23rd week	MVV Maastricht	2–0	SC Telstar	Maastricht
20:00	Anthony van den Hurk 1' 61'	Report		Stadium: De Geusselt; Attendance: 3,500

8 February 2019 24th week	SC Telstar	0–3	SC Telstar	Velsen-Zuid
20:00		Report	Daan Rienstra 61'; Darren Maatsen 67'; Dylan Seys 75'	Stadium: Sportpark Schoonenberg; Attendance: 1,721

15 February 2019 25th week	TOP Oss	1–0	SC Telstar	Oss
20:00	Hüseyin Doğan 57'	Report		Stadium: Frans Heesen Stadion; Attendance: 1,371

22 February 2019 26th week	SC Telstar	0–2	Jong Ajax	Velsen-Zuid
20:00		Report	Lassina Traoré 74'; Danilo 86'	Stadium: Sportpark Schoonenberg; Attendance: 3,001

1 March 2019 27th week	Jong FC Utrecht	0–1	SC Telstar	Bunschoten
20:00		Report	Anass Najah 15'	Stadium: Sportpark De Westmaat; Attendance: 356

8 March 2019 28th week	SC Telstar	1–0	FC Dordrecht	Velsen-Zuid
20:00	Terell Ondaan 38'	Report		Stadium: Sportpark Schoonenberg; Attendance: 1,792

15 March 2019 29th week	SC Telstar	1–0	Jong AZ	Velsen-Zuid
20:00	Terell Ondaan 82'	Report		Stadium: Sportpark Schoonenberg; Attendance: 1,688

22 March 2019 30th week	FC Den Bosch	3–4	SC Telstar	's-Hertogenbosch
20:00	Vincent Vermeij 7'; Imran Oulad Omar 19' 45'	Report	Terell Ondaan 48' (pen.) 70'; Melle Springer 56'; Ahmad Mendes Moreira 58'	Stadium: De Vliert; Attendance: 3,244

29 March 2019 31st week	SC Telstar	1–1	FC Eindhoven	Velsen-Zuid
20:00	Toine van Huizen 45+1'	Report	Elisha Sam 31'	Stadium: Sportpark Schoonenberg; Attendance: 1,738

1 April 2019 32nd week	Go Ahead Eagles	2–3	SC Telstar	Deventer
20:00	Jaroslav Navratil 11'; Thomas Verheydt 68' (pen.)	Report	Ahmad Mendes Moreira 1'; Melle Springer 64'; Dylan Mertens 90'	Stadium: De Adelaarshorst; Attendance: 6,478

5 April 2019 33rd week	SC Telstar	4–2	SC Cambuur	Velsen-Zuid
20:00	Terell Ondaan 6' (pen.); Sven van Doorm 20'; Frank Korpershoek 41'; Rodny Lopes Cabral 53'	Report	Sam Hendriks 57'; Matthew Steenvoorden 86'	Stadium: Sportpark Schoonenberg; Attendance: 1,878

12 April 2019 34th week	FC Twente	1–0	SC Telstar	Enschede
20:00	Rafik Zekhnini 15'	Report		Stadium: De Grolsch Veste; Attendance: 27,600

19 April 2019 35th week	Almere City FC	2–0	SC Telstar	Almere
20:00	James Efmorfidis 19'; Youri Loen 76'	Report		Stadium: Yanmar Stadion; Attendance: 2,634

22 April 2019 36th week	SC Telstar	4–0	Roda JC Kerkrade	Velsen-Zuid
14:30	Terell Ondaan 12' 72'; Senne Lynen 54'; Toine van Huizen 63'	Report		Stadium: Sportpark Schoonenberg; Attendance: 2,234

26 April 2019 37th week	SC Telstar	1–1	FC Volendam	Velsen-Zuid
20:00	Terell Ondaan 26'	Report	Rodney Antwi 44'	Stadium: Sportpark Schoonenberg; Attendance: 2,514

3 May 2019 38th week	Jong PSV	2–0	SC Telstar	Eindhoven
20:00	Mauro Júnior 77'; Jaell Hattu 90+2'	Report		Stadium: Philips Stadion; Attendance: 2,574

=== KNVB Cup ===
25 September 2018 1st round	Amsterdamsche FC	5–0	SC Telstar	Amsterdam
17:00	Fouad Belarbi 14'; Yordi Teijsse 62'; Johan Kulhan 71'; Milan Hoek 84'; Tim Linthorst 86'	Report		Stadium: Sportpark Goed Genoeg; Attendance: 500

== Statistics ==
=== Scorers ===
#	Player	Eerste Divisie
1	(Guyana) Terell Ondaan	13
2	(Belgium) Senne Lynen	4
3	(Netherlands) Anass Najah	3
3	(Netherlands) Melle Springer	3
3	(Netherlands) Toine van Huizen	3
6	(Guinea-Bissau) Ahmad Mendes Moreira	2
6	(Netherlands) Dylan Mertens	2
6	(Argentina) Facundo Lescano	2
6	(Netherlands) Frank Korpershoek	2
6	(Netherlands) Jasper van Heertum	2
6	(United States) Kyle Scott	2
6	(Netherlands) Rodny Lopes Cabral	2
6	(England) Ryan Seager	2
14	(Netherlands) Shaquill Sno	1
14	(Netherlands) Sven van Doorm	1

=== Appearances ===
#	Player	Eerste Divisie	KNVB	Total
1	(Netherlands) Rodny Lopes Cabral	35	0	35
2	(Netherlands) Anass Najah	33	1	34
3	(Cape Verde) Elso Brito	32	1	33
3	(Netherlands) Toine van Huizen	32	1	33
5	(Netherlands) Frank Korpershoek	32	0	32
6	(Guyana) Terell Ondaan	29	0	29
6	(Belgium) Senne Lynen	28	1	29
8	(Netherlands) Melle Springer	28	0	28
8	(Netherlands) Shaquill Sno	27	1	28
10	(Netherlands) Sven van Doorm	24	1	25
11	(Netherlands) Wesley Zonneveld	24	0	24
12	(Netherlands) Donny van Iperen	19	1	20
13	(Netherlands) Adham El Idrissi	19	0	19
13	(Netherlands) Danny van Haaren	18	1	19
13	(Netherlands) Jasper van Heertum	18	1	19
16	(Netherlands) Dylan Mertens	18	0	18
17	(Guinea-Bissau) Ahmad Mendes Moreira	16	0	16
18	(United States) Kyle Scott	14	0	14
19	(England) Ryan Seager	11	1	12
20	(Netherlands) Darren Rosheuvel	10	0	10
20	(Netherlands) Jeroen Houwen	9	1	10
22	(Argentina) Facundo Lescano	7	1	8
22	(Netherlands) Jordie van der Laan	7	1	8
24	(Switzerland) Karim Rossi	6	0	6
24	(Netherlands) Kick Groot	6	0	6
26	(Netherlands) Sven van der Maaten	4	0	4
26	(Netherlands) Ilias Bronkhorst	3	1	4
28	(Netherlands) Elvio van Overbeek	3	0	3

=== Clean sheets ===
#	Player	Eerste Divisie
1	(Netherlands) Wesley Zonneveld	3
2	(Netherlands) Jeroen Houwen	2
3	(Netherlands) Sven van der Maaten	1
Total		6

=== Disciplinary record ===
#	Player	Eerste Divisie		KNVB		Total	
#	Player	Yellow card	Red card	Yellow card	Red card	Yellow card	Red card
1	(Netherlands) Rodny Lopes Cabral	2	2	0	0	2	2
2	(Netherlands) Toine van Huizen	8	0	0	1	8	1
3	(Netherlands) Jasper van Heertum	1	1	0	1	1	1
4	(Netherlands) Anass Najah	8	0	1	0	9	0
5	(Netherlands) Frank Korpershoek	5	0	0	0	5	0
5	(United States) Kyle Scott	5	0	0	0	5	0
7	(Belgium) Senne Lynen	4	0	0	0	4	0
7	(Guyana) Terell Ondaan	4	0	0	0	4	0
9	(Netherlands) Shaquill Sno	3	0	0	0	3	0
10	(Guinea-Bissau) Ahmad Mendes Moreira	2	0	0	0	2	0
10	(Netherlands) Dylan Mertens	2	0	0	0	2	0
10	(Cape Verde) Elso Brito	2	0	0	0	2	0
10	(Netherlands) Donny van Iperen	1	0	1	0	2	0
14	(Netherlands) Adham El Idrissi	1	0	0	0	1	0
14	(Argentina) Facundo Lescano	1	0	0	0	1	0
14	(Netherlands) Ilias Bronkhorst	1	0	0	0	1	0
14	(Switzerland) Karim Rossi	1	0	0	0	1	0
14	(Netherlands) Sven van Doorm	1	0	0	0	1	0
14	(Netherlands) Danny van Haaren	0	0	1	0	1	0
