= 2024–25 Luxembourg National Division =

111th season of top flight football in Luxembourg

Luxembourg National Division
- Season: 2024–25
- Dates: 3 August 2024 – 25 May 2025
- Champions: Differdange 03 (2nd title)
- Relegated: Bettembourg; Fola Esch; Mondercange; Wiltz 71
- UEFA Champions League: Differdange 03
- Conference League: UNA Strassen; F91 Dudelange; Racing FC
- Matches: 240
- Goals: 717 (2.99 per match)
- Top goalscorer: Matheus and Yann Mabella (22 goals)
- Biggest home win: UT Pétange 6-0 Mondercange (11 August 2024)
- Biggest away win: US Hostert 1-8 UT Pétange (18 May 2025)
- Highest scoring: US Hostert 1-8 UT Pétange (18 May 2025); Progrès 7–2 Mondercange (25 May 2025)
- Longest winning run: Differdange 03 (11 matches)
- Longest unbeaten run: Differdange 03 (14 matches)
- Longest winless run: Mondercange (14 matches)
- Longest losing run: Mondercange and Fola Esch (11 matches)
- All statistics correct as of 25 May 2025.

The 2024–25 Luxembourg National Division season, also known as BGL Ligue, for sponsorship reasons, was the 111th of top-tier association football in Luxembourg. The season began on 3 August 2024 and ended on 25 May 2025.

== Teams ==
Marisca Mersch, Schifflange (both relegated after a single year) and UN Käerjéng 97 (relegated after 2 years) were relegated at the end of the previous season, while Bettembourg (promoted after a 50 year absence), Rodange 91 (promoted after a 2 year absence) and Hostert (promoted after a single year absence) were promoted from the Luxembourg Division of Honour. Differdange 03 entered the season as reigning league champions.

=== Stadia and locations ===
Locations of the 2024–25 Luxembourg National Division teams
Locations of the 2024–25 Luxembourg National Division teams (Esch Canton)

Team	Town	Stadium	Capacity	2023–24 Position
SC Bettembourg	Bettembourg	Stade Municipal Bettembourg	700	1st (Division of Honour) ▲
FC Differdange 03	Differdange	Municipal Stadium vun der Stad Déifferdeng	3,500	1st
F91 Dudelange	Dudelange	Stade Jos Nosbaum	2,558	3rd
CS Fola Esch	Esch-sur-Alzette	Stade Émile Mayrisch	7,826	14th
US Hostert	Hostert	Stade Jos Becker	1,500	4th (Division of Honour) ▲
Jeunesse Esch	Esch-sur-Alzette	Stade de la Frontière	4,000	5th
FC Mondercange	Mondercange	Stade Communal	3,300	12th
US Mondorf-les-Bains	Mondorf-les-Bains	Stade John Grün	3,600	9th
FC Progrès Niederkorn	Niederkorn	Stade Jos Haupert	2,800	4th
Racing FC Union Luxembourg	Luxembourg	Stade Achille Hammerel	5,814	10th
FC Rodange 91	Rodange	Stade Joseph Philippart	3,400	2nd (Division of Honour) ▲
FC Swift Hesperange	Hesperange	Stade Alphonse Theis	3,058	2nd
FC UNA Strassen	Strassen	Complexe Sportif Jean Wirtz	1,500	6th
Union Titus Pétange	Pétange	Stade Municipal	2,400	8th
FC Victoria Rosport	Rosport	VictoriArena	2,500	7th
FC Wiltz 71	Wiltz	Stade Am Pëtz	3,000	11th

== League table ==
Pos	Team	Pld	W	D	L	GF	GA	GD	Pts	Qualification or relegation
1	Differdange 03 (C)	30	25	3	2	69	7	+62	78	Qualification for the Champions League first qualifying round
2	UNA Strassen	30	18	6	6	62	23	+39	60	Qualification for the Conference League second qualifying round (Note: The 2024–25 Luxembourg Cup winners qualified for the Conference League second qualifying round. Since the cup winners (Differdange 03) qualified based on league position, the Conference League second round spot was passed to the second-placed team, and the second Conference League first round spot was passed to the fourth-placed team.)
3	F91 Dudelange	30	17	6	7	67	34	+33	57	Qualification for the Conference League first qualifying round
4	Racing Union	30	17	6	7	50	22	+28	57	Qualification for the Conference League first qualifying round
5	Progrès Niederkorn	30	16	7	7	54	30	+24	55	
6	Swift Hesperange	30	16	6	8	56	34	+22	54	
7	Mondorf-les-Bains	30	16	5	9	53	39	+14	53	
8	Jeunesse Esch	30	11	9	10	41	48	−7	42	
9	Union Titus Pétange	30	11	8	11	41	32	+9	41	
10	Hostert	30	11	5	14	50	69	−19	38	
11	Victoria Rosport	30	8	10	12	29	45	−16	34	
12	Rodange	30	7	8	15	40	62	−22	29	
13	Wiltz 71 (R)	30	8	5	17	37	61	−24	29	Qualification for the Luxembourg National Division play-offs
14	Bettembourg (R)	30	7	2	21	29	59	−30	23	Qualification for the Luxembourg National Division play-offs
15	Fola Esch (R)	30	4	1	25	18	78	−60	13	Relegation to the Luxembourg Division of Honour
16	Mondercange (R)	30	3	3	24	21	74	−53	12	Relegation to the Luxembourg Division of Honour

Source: UEFA, Flashscore
Rules for classification: 1) Points; 2) Goal difference; 3) Matches won; 4) Head-to-head points; 5) Head-to-head goal difference; 6) Head-to-head goals scored; 7) Play-off.
(C) Champions; (R) Relegated

== Results ==
Home \ Away	BET	DIF	DUD	FOL	HOS	JEU	MND	MON	PRO	RAC	ROD	SWI	UNA	UTP	VIC	WIL
Bettembourg	—	0–3	0–3	2–0	2–4	1–2	2–1	1–2	1–3	0–0	1–2	3–0	0–4	1–3	1–2	0–1
Differdange 03	1–0	—	3–0	4–0	4–0	1–0	4–0	3–0	1–0	1–1	0–0	0–0	2–0	2–0	3–0	4–1
F91 Dudelange	5–0	0–1	—	6–1	3–0	1–1	2–3	3–0	1–0	2–4	3–2	4–3	1–3	1–1	3–0	3–1
Fola Esch	0–2	0–5	0–2	—	0–4	0–1	1–0	0–4	0–2	0–3	1–5	0–3	0–1	0–0	1–4	1–0
Hostert	1–3	1–3	1–1	2–1	—	0–0	2–1	2–1	1–3	1–0	4–3	1–5	2–2	1–8	1–4	3–4
Jeunesse Esch	5–1	0–2	2–0	4–2 (Note: Match originally scheduled for 30 November 2024, but postponed due to a frozen pitch)	0–3	—	3–0	1–1	3–1	2–1	3–2	3–3	3–2	0–0	1–1	1–1
Mondercange	0–2	1–2	0–2	0–1	2–4	1–0	—	1–2	0–2	0–4	0–2	1–2	1–1	0–2	1–1	0–3
Mondorf-les-Bains	2–1	0–4	2–2	2–0	3–1	4–1	0–2	—	2–1	0–1	1–1	4–0	1–1	1–0	2–3	3–2
Progrès Niederkorn	1–0	0–2	2–1	5–2	3–2	3–0	7–2	1–1	—	1–1 (Note: Match originally scheduled for 25 September 2024, but abandoned due to unsuitable ground)	5–1	1–1 (Note: Match originally scheduled for 8 December 2024, but after moving stadium due to a drainage issues, was postponed due to unsuitable pitch.)	1–0	0–1	2–1	3–1
Racing Union	1–0	1–0	1–1	2–1	4–1	2–0	5–2	3–0	1–3	—	2–0	3–1	0–1	2–1	2–0	3–0
Rodange	1–2	1–5	1–3	3–1	1–1	2–0	3–2	1–5	1–1	1–1	—	0–2	2–2	0–0	0–0	4–2
Swift Hesperange	1–0	0–2	0–4	2–0	3–0	5–1	0–0	0–3 (Note: Match originally scheduled for 1 December 2024, but after Swift Hesperange did not take to the field in protest at unpaid wages, the FLF awarded a 3–0 victory to Mondorf as forfeit.)	1–0	1–0	4–0	—	1–2	4–0	5–0	3–1
UNA Strassen	3–0	1–0	0–1	3–0	2–1	5–0	5–0	1–3	1–1	0–0	4–0	0–2	—	4–0	4–1	3–0
Union Titus Pétange	4–0	0–1	2–2	2–4	0–2	0–0	6–0	1–2	0–0	1–0	3–0	0–3	0–1	—	0–0	1–0
Victoria Rosport	1–1	0–2	0–3	1–0	1–2	1–1	2–0	1–0	0–0	0–2	1–0	1–1	0–3	1–2	—	1–1
Wiltz 71	3–2	0–4	0–4	4–1	2–2	2–3	2–0	0–2	1–2	1–0	3–1	0–0	0–3	0–3	1–1	—

Source: Flashscore
Legend: Blue = home team win; Yellow = draw; Red = away team win.

== Luxembourg National Division play-offs ==
The thirteenth and fourteenth-placed teams (Wiltz 71 and Bettembourg) each faced the fourth and third-placed teams from the 2024–25 Luxembourg Division of Honour (Jeunesse Canach and Bissen) for the final two places in the 2025–26 Luxembourg National Division.

29 May 2025
19:00

Bettembourg	0–1	Bissen
		Hop 59'

Stade Um Dribbel, Bascharage

1 June 2025
19:00

Wiltz 71	1–1 (a.e.t.)	Jeunesse Canach
Mannone 90+2'		Desevic 89'
Penalties
Saidi (penalty scored); Romeyns (penalty missed); Hemkemeier (penalty scored); Cavagnera (penalty scored); Mannone (penalty scored)	4–5	(penalty scored) Desevic; (penalty scored) Aguiar; (penalty scored) Rauen; (penalty scored) Laborie; (penalty scored) Nelsinho

Stade Am Deich, Ettelbruck

== Statistics ==
=== Top scorers ===
As of 25 May 2025

Rank	Player	Club	Goals
1	(Brazil) Matheus	UNA Strassen	22
1	(Republic of the Congo) Yann Mabella	Racing Union	22
3	(France) Samir Hadji	F91 Dudelange	19
4	(Germany) Dominik Stolz	Swift Hesperange	18
4	(France) Junior Burban	Progrès Niederkorn	18
5	(Luxembourg) Kenan Avdusinovic	Hostert	17
7	(France) Guillaume Trani	Differdange 03	14
7	(France) Sylvain Atieda	Rodange	14
9	(France) Valentin Fuss	UT Pétange	13
10	(France) Zachary Hadji	UNA Strassen	12
10	(Belgium) Benjamin Romeyns	Wiltz 71	12

== Attendances ==
#	Club	Average
1	Differdange 03	916
2	Jeunesse Esch	712
3	Progrès Niederkorn	707
4	F91 Dudelange	410
5	US Mondorf	408
6	Swift Hesperange	351
7	Rodange 91	321
8	Wiltz 71	311
9	Victoria Rosport	296
10	US Hostert	278
11	Racing Union	253
12	Bettembourg	252
13	Mondercange	243
14	UNA Strassen	223
15	Union Titus Pétange	221
16	Fola Esch	214

== See also ==
- 2024–25 Luxembourg Cup
- 2024–25 Luxembourg Division of Honour
