= 2023–24 Luxembourg Division of Honour =

Luxembourg Division of Honour
- Season: 2023–24
- Dates: 20 August 2023 – 26 May 2024
- Champions: Bettembourg
- Promoted: Bettembourg; Hostert; Rodange 91
- Relegated: Grevenmacher; Lorentzweiler; Medernach; Weiler
- Matches: 30
- All statistics correct as of 11 January 2024.

The 2023–24 Luxembourg Division of Honour was the 63rd season of second-tier association football in Luxembourg. The season began on 20 August 2023 and ended on 26 May 2024.

== Teams ==
Schifflange 95 and Marisca Mersch were promoted to the Luxembourg National Division at the end of the previous season. They were replaced by Hostert, who finished in the bottom two positions of the 2022–23 Luxembourg National Division and Etzella Ettelbruck.

FC Atert Bissen, Schieren, Luxembourg City and Junglinster were relegated at the end of the previous season and were replaced by FC Koeppchen Wormeldange, FC Lorentzweiler, Walferdange and FC Avenir Beggen, who earned promotion from the Luxembourg 1. Division.

Team	Venue	Capacity
Hostert	Stade Jos Becker	1,500
Jeunesse Canach	Stade Rue de Lenningen	1,000
Rumelange	Stade Municipal	2,950
Grevenmacher	Op Flohr Stadion	4,000
FC Koeppchen Wormeldange	Stade Am Ga	1,000
FC Yellow Boys	Am Dieltchen	1,100
Etzella Ettelbruck	Stade du Centre Sportif du Deich	2,200
Bettembourg	Stade Municipal Bettembourg	1,000
FC Rodange 91	Stade Joseph Philippart	3,400
FC Mamer 32	Stade François Trausch	2,600
FC Alisontia	Stade Henri Bausch	1,000
Berbourg	Stade Renert	800
Medernach	Terrain Bloen Eck	1,000
Lorentzweiler	Terrain rue de Hunsdorf	800
Walferdange	Stade Prince Henri	1,000
Avenir Beggen	Stade Henri Dunant	4,800

== League table ==
Pos	Team	Pld	W	D	L	GF	GA	GD	Pts	Promotion, qualification or relegation
1	Bettembourg (C, P)	30	18	3	9	68	44	+24	57	Promotion to the Luxembourg National Division
2	Rodange 91 (P)	30	17	4	9	67	52	+15	55	Promotion to the Luxembourg National Division
3	Rumelange	30	14	8	8	59	51	+8	50	Qualification for the Luxembourg National Division play-offs
4	Hostert (O, P)	30	13	10	7	69	52	+17	49	Qualification for the Luxembourg National Division play-offs
5	Etzella Ettelbruck	30	13	9	8	46	26	+20	48	
6	Berbourg	30	12	6	12	38	41	−3	42	
7	Koeppchen	30	12	4	14	41	43	−2	40	
8	Steinsel	30	11	7	12	48	53	−5	40	
9	Avenir Beggen	30	11	6	13	40	51	−11	39	
10	Mamer 32	30	10	8	12	54	49	+5	38	
11	Jeunesse Canach	30	10	7	13	42	54	−12	37	
12	Walferdange	30	8	12	10	56	57	−1	36	
13	Lorentzweiler (R)	30	9	9	12	49	54	−5	36	Qualification for the Luxembourg Division of Honour play-offs
14	Weiler (R)	30	8	11	11	53	65	−12	35	Qualification for the Luxembourg Division of Honour play-offs
15	Grevenmacher (R)	30	9	7	14	54	64	−10	34	Relegation to the Luxembourg 1. Division
16	Medernach (R)	30	6	7	17	43	71	−28	25	Relegation to the Luxembourg 1. Division

Rules for classification: 1) Points; 2) Goal difference; 3) Matches won; 4) Head-to-head points; 5) Head-to-head goal difference; 6) Head-to-head goals scored; 7) Play-off.
(C) Champions; (O) Play-off winners; (P) Promoted; (R) Relegated

== Results ==
Each team plays every other team in the league, home-and-away, for a total of 30 matches each.

== Luxembourg Division of Honour play-offs ==
The thirteenth and fourteenth-placed teams (Lorentzweiler and Weiler) each faced one of the two runners-up from the Luxembourg 1. Division (Luxembourg City and Feulan) for the final two places in the 2024–25 Luxembourg Division of Honour.

30 May 2024

Lorentzweiler	3–4	Luxembourg City

1 June 2024

Weiler	0–3	Feulan
