= Joshua Nadeau =

French footballer (born 1994)

Personal information
- Date of birth: 12 September 1994 (age 32)
- Place of birth: Paris, France
- Height: 1.84 m (6 ft 0 in)
- Positions: Centre-back; right-back

Team information
- Current team: SC Bettembourg
- Number: 33

Youth career
- 2011–2014: Ajaccio

Senior career*
Years	Team	Apps	(Gls)
2013–2014	Ajaccio	7	(0)
2014–2015	AEL Limassol	9	(0)
2016	Gefle IF	21	(1)
2017–2018	Hansa Rostock	34	(0)
2018–2019	Virton	7	(0)
2019–2020	Boulogne-Billancourt	3	(0)
2020–2023	Rodange 91	76	(0)
2023–	SC Bettembourg	27	(0)
- * Club domestic league appearances and goals as of 16 October 2024

Joshua Nadeau (born 12 September 1994) is a French professional footballer who plays as a defender for BGL Ligue club SC Bettembourg.

== Career ==
Born in Paris, Nadeau made his professional debut for the Ajaccio first team on 18 August 2013 against reigning champions Paris Saint-Germain at Parc des Princes. He was given the first team opportunity as teammate Benjamin André was not eligible having received a red card in the previous match.

For the 2014–15 season Nadeau joined Cypriot First Division side AEL Limassol.

Having terminated his contract with AEL, he was six months without a club before trialling with Allsvenskan club Gefle IF. In February 2016, he signed a one-year contract including an option for two further years with Gefle.

In January 2017, Nadeau trialled with 3. Liga club Hansa Rostock and played in three friendlies before signing a 2.5-year contract until summer 2019. In late August 2018, his contract with Hansa Rostock was terminated on his request. He made 42 appearances for the club.

On 27 August 2018, he signed a contract with Belgian side Virton.

== Career statistics ==
As of match played 16 July 2019

Appearances and goals by club, season and competition
Club	Season	League			National Cup		Other		Total	
Club	Season	Division	Apps	Goals	Apps	Goals	Apps	Goals	Apps	Goals
AC Ajaccio II	2012–13	CFA 2	22	0	—		—		22	0
AC Ajaccio II	2013–14	CFA 2	16	0	—		—		16	0
AC Ajaccio II	Total		38	0	—		0	0	38	0
Ajaccio	2013–14	Ligue 1	7	0	0	0	0	0	7	0
AEL Limassol	2014–15	Cypriot First Division	9	0	0	0	0	0	9	0
Gefle	2016	Allsvenskan	21	1	2 (Note: One appearance in the 2015–16 Svenska Cupen and one in the 2016–17 campaign)	0	—		23	1
Hansa Rostock	2016–17	3. Liga	8	0	0	0	—		8	0
Hansa Rostock	2017–18	3. Liga	25	0	1	0	—		26	0
Hansa Rostock	2018–19	3. Liga	1	0	0	0	—		1	0
Hansa Rostock	Total		34	0	1	0	0	0	35	0
Virton	2018–19	Belgian FAD	7	0	1	0	0	0	8	0
Career total			116	1	4	0	0	0	120	1
