= Cees Groot =

Dutch footballer

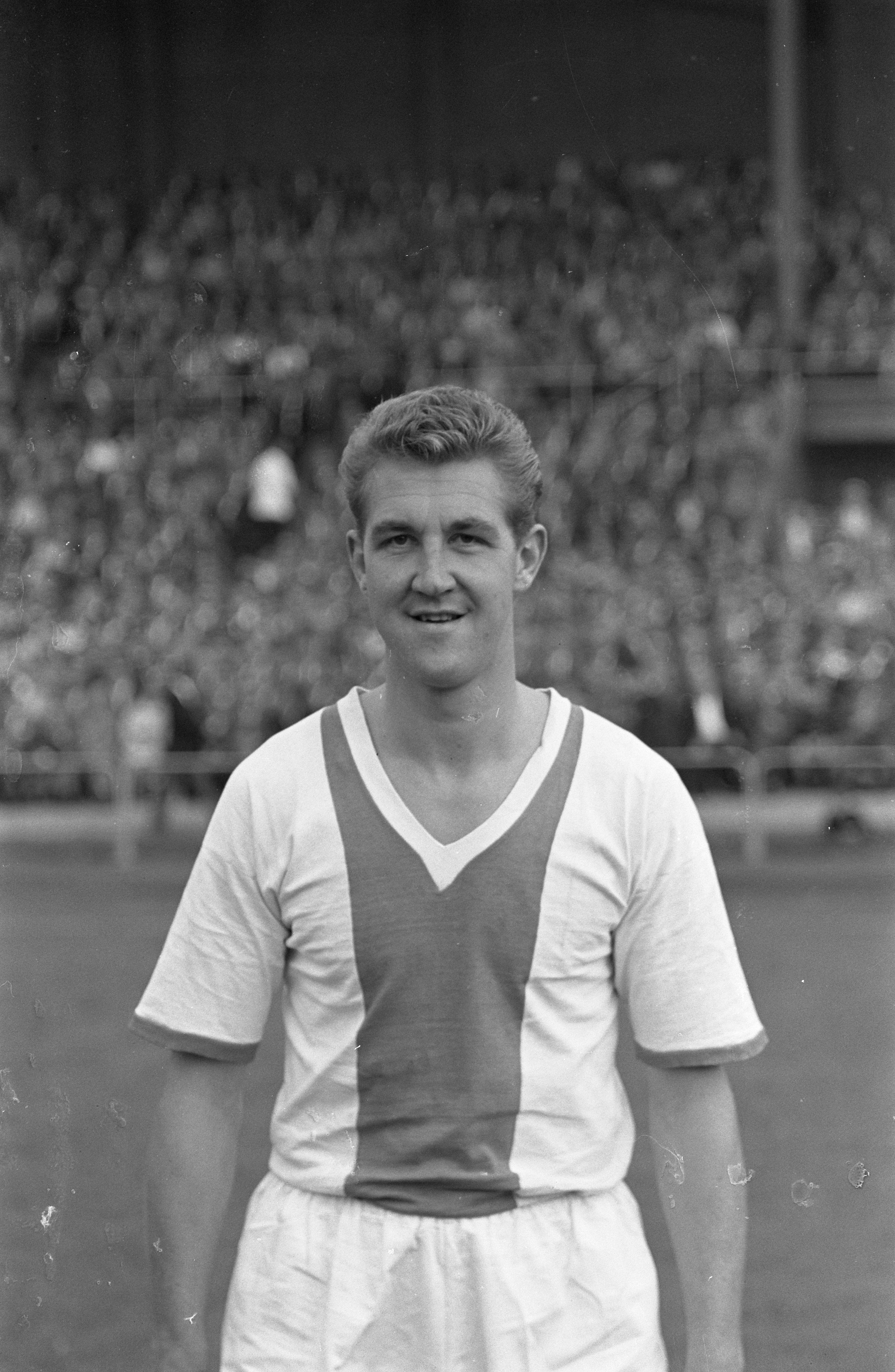

Personal information
- Full name: Cees Groot
- Date of birth: 29 June 1932
- Place of birth: Zaandijk, Netherlands
- Date of death: 13 March 1988 (aged 55)
- Place of death: Winterberg, West Germany
- Position: Striker

Youth career
- VV Zaandijk

Senior career*
| Years | Team | Apps | (Gls) |
| 1956–1957 | Heerenveen | 28 | (27) |
| 1957–1959 | Stormvogels | 55 | (33) |
| 1959–1964 | Ajax | 120 | (100) |
| 1964–1967 | Zaanstreek | 74 | (32) |
| 1967 | Pittsburgh Phantoms | | |
| 1968 | Zaandijk | 1 | (0) |
| Total | | 278 | (192) |
- * Club domestic league appearances and goals

Cees Groot (29 June 1932 – 13 March 1988) was a Dutch footballer who played as a striker for Heerenveen, Stormvogels, Ajax, Zaanstreek and the Pittsburgh Phantoms during his career.

== Club career ==
=== Heerenveen ===
Groot began his career in the youth ranks of ZVV Zaandijk in his home town, before being recruited, and signing a contract with Heerenveen in 1956. He would go on to play one season for the Friesian club, before transferring once more, this time around to IJ.V.V. Stormvogels from IJmuiden.

=== Stormvogels ===
Signing with the Stormvogels in 1957, Groot would play with his younger brother by six years, Henk Groot at the club from Velsen, while working in the Metal Industry during the week. Both the Groot brothers made such an impression, while playing for the Stormvogels, that they were both offered contracts with Ajax, leaving for the Amsterdam side at the end of the 1958–59 season, having played two seasons for the Stormvogels.

=== Ajax ===
Groot was a physically strong striker, and was very good in the air, but had very little finesse and technical ability. His biggest strong point was his uncanny ability to score goals. In his first season with Ajax, he scored 29 goals for the Amsterdam side, while his younger brother Henk scored 38. Together the Groot brothers were responsible for more than half of the club's goals scored, and finished the season in first and third place of the league's top scorers. Groot finished as the club's top scorer for three consecutive seasons (1961–62, 1962–63, 1963–64), and scored more than 100 goals (132) for Ajax. He is ranked 11th place on the club's all-time top scorer list.

=== Zaanstreek ===
In 1964, Groot left Ajax, for the newly formed FC Zaanstreek. He would go on to play a total of three seasons for the side from Zaanstad, before following his former Ajax teammate Co Prins to play in the United States. The two would be rejoined for the first time since their Ajax days, playing together again for the Pittsburgh Phantoms.

=== Pittsburgh Phantoms ===
Moving to Pittsburgh, United States in 1967, Groot would go on to play a total of three seasons for the Pittsburgh Phantoms in the National Premier Soccer League (NPSL). After his period in the U.S., Groot returned to the Netherlands, and decided to play for his hometown side ZVV Zaandijk again. However, having played for the non-recognized NPSL, his request to play for Zaandijk was declined by the KNVB, the governing body of football in the Netherlands. This ruling meant that Groot was no longer eligible to play or coach football in the Netherlands.

=== VV Zaandijk ===
In February 1968, the KNVB decided to overturn their initial ruling, and permit Groot to play football again in the Netherlands starting 1 June 1968. Groot took it upon himself to debut for ZVV Zaandijk in March, three months earlier than the court ruling. However, he broke his leg in the first match back and was sidelined from football for months, leading to his eventual retirement.

== Family ==
Cees' younger brother Henk also played at Ajax. His grandson Kick Groot is a football player.

== Career statistics ==
=== Club ===
Appearances and goals by club, season and competition
| Club | Season | League | | | Cup | | Europe | | Total | |
| Club | Season | Division | Apps | Goals | Apps | Goals | Apps | Goals | Apps | Goals |
|---|---|---|---|---|---|---|---|---|---|---|
| Ajax | 1959–60 | Eredivisie | 34 | 27 | | | — | | 34 | 27 |
| Ajax | 1960–61 | Eredivisie | 13 | 8 | | | 1 (Note: Appearance in European Cup) | 2 | 14 | 10 |
| Ajax | 1961–62 | Eredivisie | 27 | 23 | | | 2 (Note: Appearance in European Cup Winners' Cup) | 0 | 29 | 23 |
| Ajax | 1962–63 | Eredivisie | 20 | 18 | | | — | | 20 | 18 |
| Ajax | 1963–64 | Eredivisie | 26 | 22 | | | — | | 26 | 22 |
| Career total | | | 120 | 98 | | | 3 | 2 | 123 | 100 |

== Post-career ==
After his retirement from professional football, Groot became a sports teacher. He taught sports at a halfway house near the Leidseplein in Amsterdam, amongst other places. After teaching, Groot returned to football, and became a youth trainer at Ajax. He died of cardiac arrest in 1988 during a winter vacation trip to the Sauerland in West Germany.

Since 1991, a football tournament hosted in his hometown of Zaandijk, and named "Cees Groot-toernooi" (the Cees Groot tournament) in his honor, is staged annually, where youth teams of various football teams come to compete.

== Honours ==
=== Club ===
Ajax

- Eredivisie: 1959–60
- KNVB Cup: 1960–61
- Karl Rappan Cup: 1962
