= Robert da Grava =

Luxembourgish footballer

Personal information
- Date of birth: 17 August 1944
- Date of death: 16 July 2016 (aged 71)
- Position: Defender

Senior career*
Years	Team	Apps	(Gls)
1963–1977	Jeunesse Esch		

International career
1972–1976	Luxembourg	10	(0)
- * Club domestic league appearances and goals

Robert da Grava (17 August 1944 – 16 July 2016) was a Luxembourgish footballer who played as a defender.

Playing for Jeunesse Esch from 1963 to 1977, he won Luxembourg league championships in 1967, 1968, 1970, 1973, 1974, 1975, 1976 and 1977 as well as cup championships in 1973, 1974 and 1976.

Following his death in 2016, a minute of silence was observed during a match between Jeunesse Esch and Union Titus Pétange.

== See also ==
- List of one-club men in association football
