= Kevin Lefranc =

French footballer (born 1986)

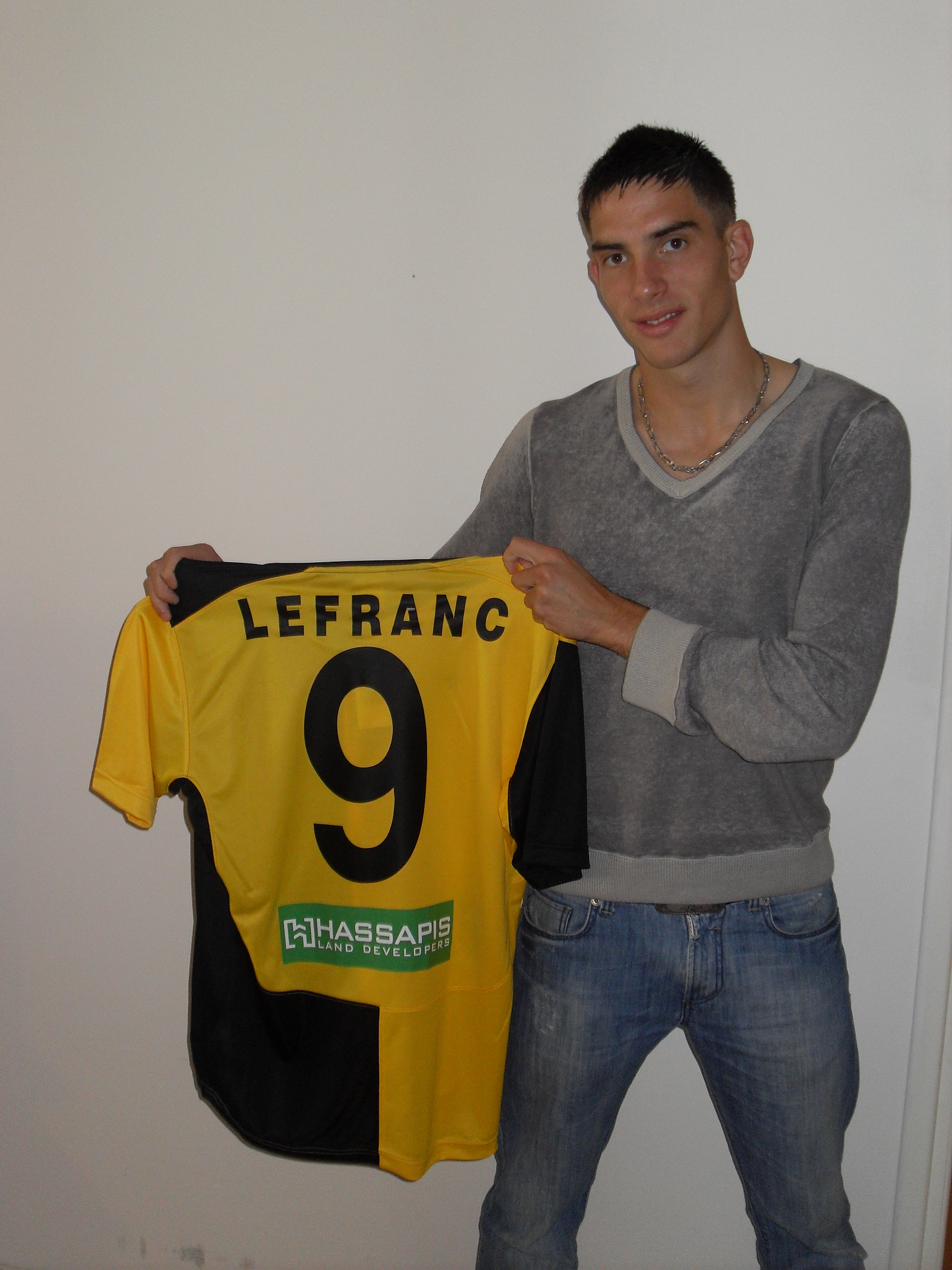

Personal information
- Date of birth: 1 March 1986 (age 40)
- Place of birth: Vitry-le-François, France
- Height: 1.85 m (6 ft 1 in)
- Position: Forward

Team information
- Current team: Bettembourg II

Youth career
- CO Saint-Dizier
- 2002–2005: Troyes

Senior career*
Years	Team	Apps	(Gls)
2005–2006	Constancia	15	(3)
2006	Ronse	13	(2)
2007	Mouscron	8	(0)
2007–2008	Boulogne	0	(0)
2008	ASIL Lysi	7	(1)
2008–2009	FC Baulmes	8	(2)
2009–2010	Virton	13	(1)
2011–2012	Etoile FC	25	(3)
2012	Gravelines	1	(1)
2012–2013	RE Bertrix	13	(2)
2013	SR Delémont	5	(4)
2013–2016	Progrès Niederkorn	17	(2)
2015–2016	→ Jeunesse Canach (loan)	19	(9)
2016–2021	Jeunesse Canach	39	(6)
2021–2023	Jeunesse Canach II		
2024–	Bettembourg II		
- * Club domestic league appearances and goals as of 2 February 2026

Kevin Lefranc (born 1 March 1986) is a French professional footballer who played as a forward for Bettembourg II.

== Career ==
Lefranc was signed by Troyes at the age of 14, after showing promising signs whilst playing for his youth club at CO Saint-Dizier. in 2005 he moved to the island of Majorca, Spain, where he signed with 3ª - Group 11 club Constancia. However, his stay was short, leaving the club after it fell into financial problems, only scoring 3 times in 15 appearances.

Lefranc then travelled to Belgium, where he signed for Ronse, then in the Belgian Second Division. He made his debut for the club in a game against Meerhout Once more, his stay was short only lasting 13 games for the return of 2 goals.

He then signed for two clubs in the space of 12 months with Royal Mouscron-Péruwelz, making eight appearances, and Boulogne where his contract was terminated without playing a single game.

In 2008, Lefranc moved abroad once more, this time to Cyprus, where he signed with Cypriot Third Division club ASIL Lysi. However, this was once more an unsuccessful move, as he only made seven appearances, scoring once.

Moving back to Europe, he signed a short-term contract with FC Baulmes in the 1.Liga. He was then signed by Virton in the Belgian Third Division B, on a two-year contract. However, he was controversially dropped from the first XI to the reserve squad half way through his contract. Lefranc claims he was only notified by text message.

Lefranc was hoping to go out on loan, to FC Bleid, however due to financial reasons, Virton refused to let him go, and at the end of the season, Lefranc moved abroad for a third time, this time out to Singapore, with professional outfit Etoile FC in the S.League, where he signed a one-year contract.

Lefranc made his debut for the Clementi Stars in the opening round 2–0 victory over Geylang United.

Lefranc moved to French side Etoile FC in 2011 who played in the Singapore S.League where he scored 3 goals in 25 games for them. After one season he was released and then moved back to Belgium to sign for RE Bertrix in 2012. After one season at RE Bertrix he was signed by Luxembourg side SR Delémont in 2013. He was there until July 2015 when he was loaned out to Jeunesse Canach, then of the Luxembourg Division of Honour where he scored 9 goals in 19 games and helped the team finish third to earn promotion back to the Luxembourg National Division at the end of the 2015–16 season. After his loan spell finished Jeunesse Canach signed Lefranc on a contract until 2019.

He has French and Belgian citizenship.
