= Henk Groot =

Dutch footballer (1938–2022)

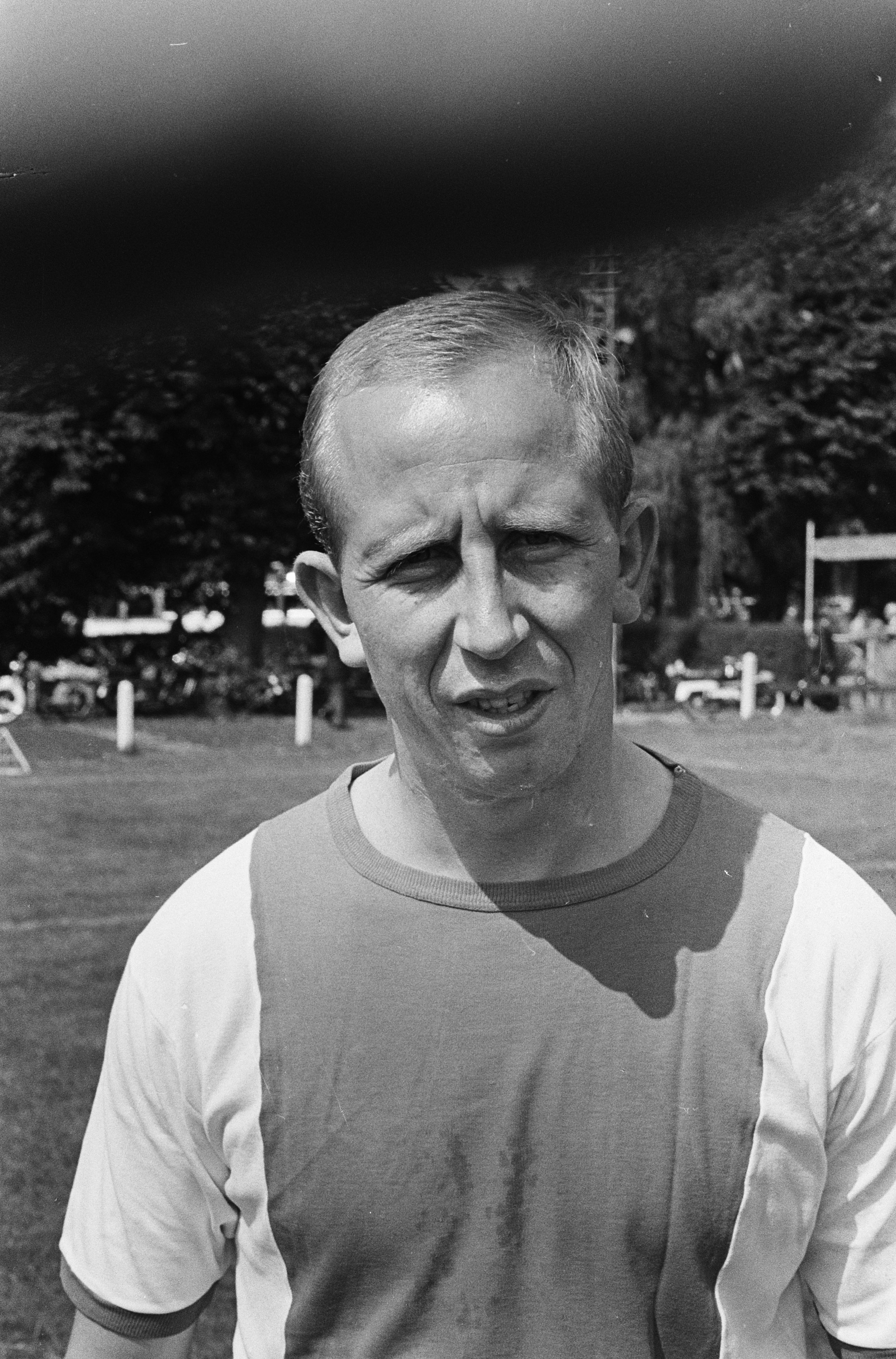
- Groot in 1965

Personal information
- Full name: Hendrik Groot
- Date of birth: 22 April 1938
- Place of birth: Zaandijk, Netherlands
- Date of death: 11 May 2022 (aged 84)
- Place of death: Zaandam, Netherlands
- Position: Forward

Youth career
- 1947-1954: FC Zaandijk
- 1954-1956: Stormvogels

Senior career*
Years	Team	Apps	(Gls)
1956–1959	Stormvogels	81	(54)
1959–1963	Ajax	124	(115)
1963–1965	Feijenoord	54	(34)
1965–1969	Ajax	101	(47)
Total		364	(250)

International career
1960–1969	Netherlands	39	(12)

Managerial career
- 1969–1973: Ajax (scout)
- * Club domestic league appearances and goals

Hendrik Groot (22 April 1938 – 11 May 2022) was a Dutch footballer who played as a forward and attacking midfielder.

== Club career ==
Born in Zaandijk, Groot started playing football for hometown club ZVV Zaandijk before joining Stormvogels alongside his older brother Cees. Henk later made his professional debut on 23 August 1959 in a 3–0 win of Ajax against NAC, scoring a hattrick in the same match. He also played for Feyenoord. Groot was renowned for his goalscoring prowess, especially with headers. His most famous goal was a header against Real Madrid in 1967. He is still record goalscorer in one season for Ajax, since he scored 41 in the 1960-61 Eredivisie season.

== International career ==
A prolific striker, Groot scored 12 goals in 39 games for the Netherlands.

== Family ==
His older brother Cees Groot also played for Ajax. Henk Groot is related to Dutch football player Kick Groot.

== Career statistics ==
=== International ===
Appearances and goals by national team and year
National team	Year	Apps	Goals
Netherlands	1960	8	3
Netherlands	1961	6	4
Netherlands	1962	6	4
Netherlands	1963	6	1
Netherlands	1964	0	0
Netherlands	1965	3	0
Netherlands	1966	0	0
Netherlands	1967	5	0
Netherlands	1968	3	0
Netherlands	1969	2	0
Total		39	12

== Honours ==
Ajax

- Eredivisie: 1959–60, 1965–66, 1966–67, 1967–68
- KNVB Cup: 1960–61, 1966–67
- International Football Cup: 1961–62
- European Cup: runner up 1968-1969

Feyenoord

- Eredivisie: 1964–65
- KNVB Cup: 1964–65

Individual

- Eredivisie top scorer: 1959–60 – 38 goals in 33 matches, 1960–61 – 41 goals in 32 matches

There are mildly differing numbers out there with regard to the number of matches and goals.
