= Elso =

Elso is a given name. Notable people with the name include:

- Elso Barghoorn (1915–1984), American paleobotanist
- Elso Brito (born 1994), Dutch footballer
