= Bakary Sissoko =

French footballer (born 1998)

Personal information
- Full name: Bakary Sissoko
- Date of birth: 11 January 1998 (age 28)
- Place of birth: Sèvres, France
- Height: 1.86 m (6 ft 1 in)
- Position: Defender

Team information
- Current team: Union Titus Pétange
- Number: 88

Youth career
- 2003–2011: Bagneux
- 2011–2013: Montrouge
- 2013–2016: Troyes

Senior career*
Years	Team	Apps	(Gls)
2016–2019	Troyes II	60	(1)
2017–2019	Troyes	0	(0)
2019	→ Drancy (loan)	4	(0)
2021–2023	Atert Bissen	27	(1)
2023–2024	Etzella	29	(0)
2024–	Union Titus Pétange	31	(0)
- * Club domestic league appearances and goals as of 13 June 2026

Bakary Sissoko (born 11 January 1998) is a French professional footballer who plays as a defender for Luxembourgish club Union Titus Pétange.

== Professional career ==
Sissoko made his professional debut with Troyes AC in a 4–2 Coupe de France loss to AJ Auxerre on 8 January 2017. On 23 May 2018, Sissoko signed his first professional contract with Troyes, keeping him at the club for three years. In January 2019 he was loaned to JA Drancy.

== Personal life ==
Sissoko was born in Sèvres, France. He holds French and Malian nationalities.
