= João Jaquité =

Bissau-Guinean footballer

Personal information
- Full name: João Lamine Jaquité
- Date of birth: 22 February 1996 (age 30)
- Place of birth: Bissau, Guinea-Bissau
- Height: 1.72 m (5 ft 7 1/2 in)
- Position: Midfielder

Team information
- Current team: Bettembourg
- Number: 6

Youth career
- 2012–2014: Povoense
- 2014–2015: Tondela

Senior career*
Years	Team	Apps	(Gls)
2014	Povoense	2	(0)
2015–2021	Tondela	53	(1)
2017–2018	→ Lusitano Vildemoinhos (loan)	32	(2)
2021–2022	Vilafranquense	13	(0)
2022	Hapoel Nof HaGalil	8	(0)
2023–2024	Ceahlăul Piatra Neamț	14	(0)
2024–2025	Sanem	23	(5)
2025–	Bettembourg	17	(0)

International career
2019–2021	Guinea-Bissau	14	(0)
- * Club domestic league appearances and goals as of 13 June 2026

João Lamine Jaquité (born 22 February 1996) is a Bissau-Guinean professional footballer who plays as a midfielder for Luxembourg Division of Honour club Bettembourg.

== Club career ==
=== Tondela ===
Born in Bissau, Jaquité started playing organised football in Portugal, with amateurs União Atlético Povoense. On 8 July 2015, C.D. Tondela announced his promotion to the senior team, recently promoted to the Primeira Liga.

Jaquité appeared in his first match as a professional on 20 December 2015, starting and playing 52 minutes in a 1–3 home loss against Vitória F.C. in the top division. In the 2017–18 season, he was loaned to third tier club Lusitano FCV.

Jaquité scored his only goal in the Portuguese top flight on 21 February 2021, in a 4–2 defeat at S.C. Braga.

=== Vilafranquense ===
On 20 August 2021, Jaquité signed with U.D. Vilafranquense of the Liga Portugal 2. He totalled 16 appearances during his spell.

=== Later career ===
In the following seasons, Jaquité represented Hapoel Nof HaGalil FC (Israeli Liga Leumit), CSM Ceahlăul Piatra Neamț (Romanian Liga II) and CS Sanem and SC Bettembourg in Luxembourg (the latter from the Division of Honour).

== International career ==
Jaquité won his first cap for Guinea-Bissau on 23 March 2019, coming on as a 90th-minute substitute for Zezinho in a 2–2 home draw to Mozambique for the 2019 Africa Cup of Nations qualifiers. He was selected for the finals by coach Baciro Candé.
