= Anna Maria Tobbe =

Dutch pharmacist (1838–1886)

- Born: September 24, 1838; Zaandijk, North Holland, Netherlands
- Died: 17 August 1886 (aged 47)
- Occupation: Pharmacist

Anna Maria Tobbe (1838–1886) was a Dutch pharmacist. She was the second female pharmacist in the Netherlands, but the first woman to apply for a job as a pharmacist. Her application eventually brought about the reform that enabled other women to be licensed.

Tobbe was the fourth of seven children of Hendrik Tobbe (third generation to bear that name) and Jeannette Scholten, and was born in a wooden house on de Lagedijk (The Lower Dike) in Zaandijk. Along with her siblings, she belonged to the fourth generation of a family of surgeons and pharmacists.

In 1864, when Tobbe was 26, her father died. While continuing to run the pharmacy with her mother, Anna sent a request to the Provincial Commission on Medical Research to be registered as a pharmacist clerk, working in her late father's pharmacy, which would be run by an overseer. The commission found this request from a woman so remarkable that they forwarded it to the Minister of the Interior, who refused the request on the grounds that Article 17 of the instruction for pharmacists used the word "he". After this law was amended in 1868, Tobbe applied again for admission to the examination and was accepted. She received her diploma in The Hague on 10 July 1868, one week after Aaltje Visser from Lemmer, also the daughter of a pharmacist.

The pharmacy continued to be run by a man, Lodewijk Wigersma, who had married Anna's sister Helena. It was renamed from "Tobbe Pharmacy" to "De Roemer".
