= Mohamed Guilavogui =

Malian footballer (born 1996)

Personal information
- Date of birth: 14 November 1996 (age 29)
- Place of birth: Bamako, Mali
- Height: 1.84 m (6 ft 0 in)
- Position: Forward

Team information
- Current team: Bettembourg
- Number: 21

Youth career
- 2006–2014: Yeelen Olympique
- 2014–2016: Montpellier

Senior career*
| Years | Team | Apps | (Gls) |
| 2014–2016 | Montpellier B | 25 | (2) |
| 2016–2017 | Clermont B | 23 | (13) |
| 2016–2017 | Clermont | 2 | (0) |
| 2017–2019 | Pau | 56 | (10) |
| 2017–2019 | Pau B | 13 | (3) |
| 2019–2022 | Villefranche | 48 | (8) |
| 2022–2023 | GOAL | 28 | (5) |
| 2023–2024 | Le Puy | 10 | (1) |
| 2024 | Jura Sud | 9 | (0) |
| 2024 | Granville | 17 | (2) |
| 2025– | Bettembourg | 28 | (12) |

International career^{‡}
| 2015–2016 | Mali U20 | 9 | (0) |
| 2016 | Mali U23 | 4 | (0) |
- * Club domestic league appearances and goals as of 13 June 2026 ‡ National team caps and goals as of 26 May 2016

Mohamed Guilavogui (born 14 November 1996) is a Malian professional footballer who plays as a forward for Luxembourg Division of Honour club Bettembourg.

== Club career ==
A product of the youth system at Montpellier, Guilavogui made the move to Clermont in the summer of 2016. He made his senior debut with the club in a 1–1 Ligue 2 tie with Nîmes Olympique on 4 November 2016. In July 2017 he signed for Championnat National side Pau. In July 2019 he moved to fellow Championnat National side Villefranche.

In July 2022, Guilavogui joined fourth-tier Championnat National 2 club GOAL.

== International career ==
Guilavogui made appearances for the Mali U20s at 2015 African U-20 Championship and the 2016 Toulon Tournament.
