= Jérémy Mawatu =

French footballer (born 1997)

Personal information
- Date of birth: 12 August 1997 (age 29)
- Place of birth: Créteil, France
- Height: 1.67 m (5 ft 6 in)
- Position: Midfielder

Team information
- Current team: Pétange
- Number: 8

Youth career
- 2014–2016: Auxerre

Senior career*
Years	Team	Apps	(Gls)
2014–2016	Auxerre II	7	(0)
2017–2018	Créteil	8	(0)
2017–2018	→ Créteil II	18	(1)
2018	Bobigny	5	(0)
2019–2021	Energetik-BGU Minsk	64	(2)
2022–	Pétange	59	(0)
- * Club domestic league appearances and goals as of 14 February 2025

Jérémy Mawatu (born 12 August 1997) is a French professional footballer who plays for Pétange.

He holds both French and DR Congolese nationalities.
