= David Silva (footballer, born October 1986) =

Cape Verdean association football player

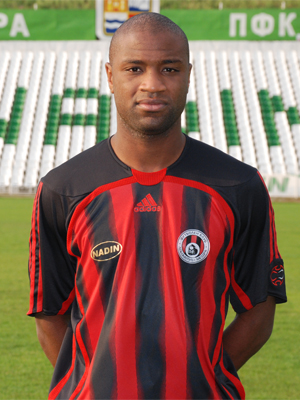
- Silva with Lokomotiv Mezdra in 2009

Personal information
- Full name: David Mendes da Silva
- Date of birth: 11 October 1986 (age 40)
- Place of birth: Coimbra, Portugal
- Position: Winger

Team information
- Current team: Bettembourg
- Number: 3

Youth career
- Porto

Senior career*
Years	Team	Apps	(Gls)
2005–2007	FC Porto		
2007–2008	Tourizense	33	(4)
2008–2009	Lokomotiv Mezdra	15	(2)
2009–2010	CSKA Sofia	13	(1)
2010	→ Castellón (loan)	6	(0)
2010–2012	Kilmarnock	45	(4)
2012–2013	Olhanense	16	(1)
2013–2014	Kilmarnock	3	(0)
2015	Jaro	10	(0)
2016	Bangkok	20	(9)
2017	Songkhla United		
2018	US Mondorf	12	(0)
2019–2022	US Mondorf	66	(6)
2022–	Bettembourg	93	(16)

International career^{‡}
2012–2013	Cape Verde	7	(0)
- * Club domestic league appearances and goals as of 13 June 2026 ‡ National team caps and goals as of 15 June 2013

David Mendes da Silva (born 11 October 1986) is a footballer who plays as a winger for Bettembourg.

He began his career at Porto, where he did not make the first team, and also played in Bulgaria, Scotland, Spain, Finland, Thailand and Luxembourg.

Born in Portugal to Cape Verdean parents, he earned seven caps for Cape Verde at full international level. He was part of their squad that reached the quarter-finals of the 2013 Africa Cup of Nations.

== Club career ==
After spending the first three years of his career in his home country with Porto B and Tourizense, Silva relocated to Bulgaria in June 2008, signing a three-year contract with Lokomotiv Mezdra. He played 15 games in the Bulgarian first division, scoring two goals.

He left in January 2009 for CSKA Sofia along with teammate Rui Miguel. He scored his first goal with a powerful long-range shot from about 25 metres (82 ft) in his first match for CSKA in the A PFG against Belasitsa, a 3–0 win. In January 2010, he was transferred to CD Castellón for the remainder of the season. On 23 June 2010, his contract with CSKA was terminated by mutual consent.

On 1 August 2010, Silva signed a two-year deal with Kilmarnock after impressing as a trialist in pre-season. He was Mixu Paatelainen's first signing as manager.

Silva spent the 2012–13 season in Portugal, at Olhanense. On his second Primeira Liga appearance, he scored his only goal to equalise in a 1–1 draw at Académica de Coimbra on 24 August.

Silva returned to Kilmarnock on 26 September 2013, signing until the end of the season. After failing to prove his fitness, he was released in January 2014.

After spells in Finland's Veikkausliiga with FF Jaro and in Thailand with Bangkok F.C. and Songkhla United, Silva signed for US Mondorf-les-Bains in the Luxembourg National Division in June 2019.

For me it is a pride and an honour to represent the country of my parents. Although I was born already in Portugal, I grew up in a Cape Verdean atmosphere, in Venda Nova, and so I have a very strong connection to the country.

— David Silva

== International career ==
In October 2012, Silva received his first call up for the Cape Verdean national team, for a 2013 Africa Cup of Nations qualifying match against Cameroon on 14 October.

Silva was called up for the 2013 Africa Cup of Nations, his country's first major tournament. He made one appearance in the opening game, as a 76th-minute substitute for Héldon Ramos in a goalless draw against hosts South Africa.
