= Jordie van der Laan =

Dutch footballer (born 1993)

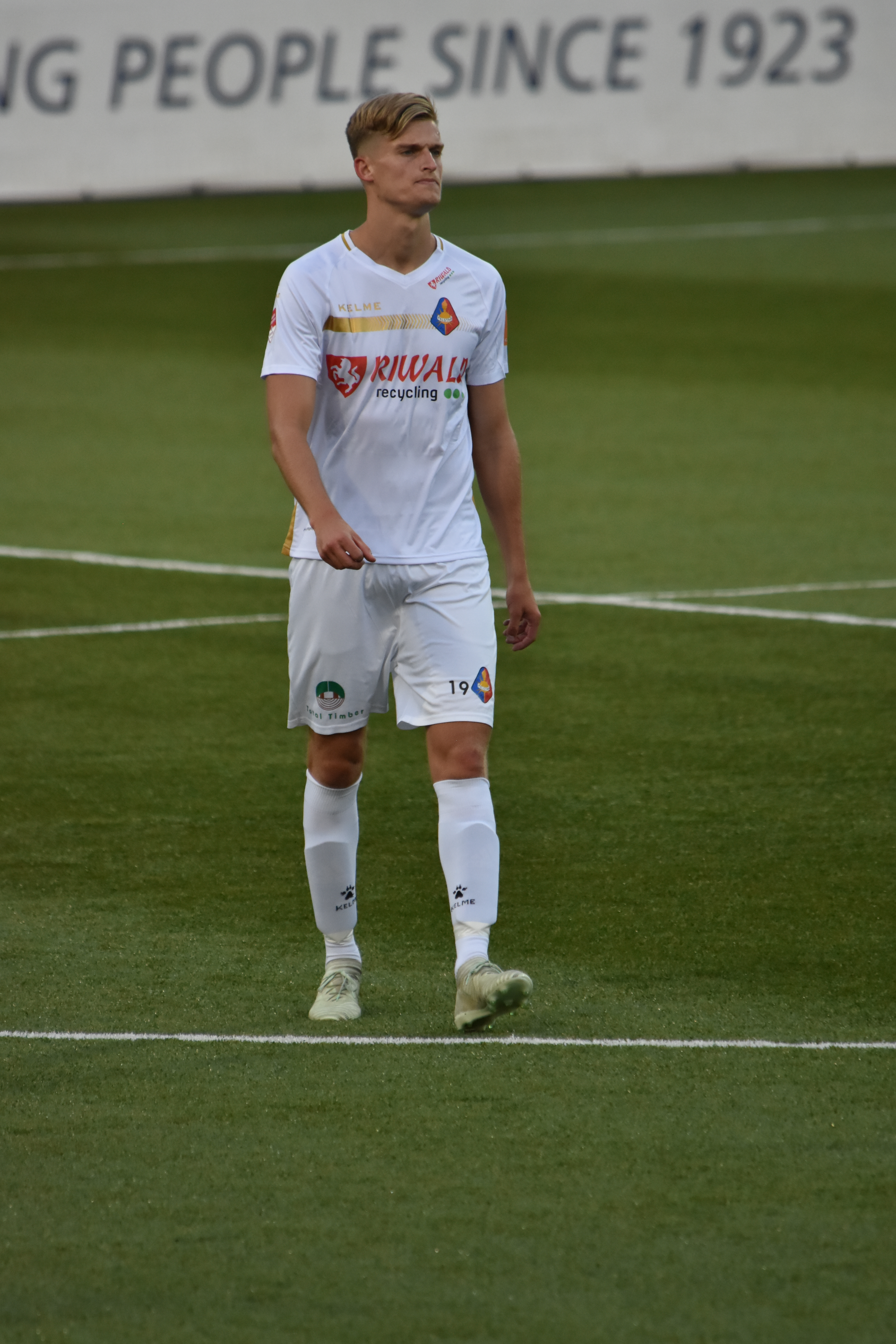
- Jordie van der Laan in 2018

Personal information
- Date of birth: 28 October 1993 (age 33)
- Place of birth: Cuijk, Netherlands
- Height: 1.95 m (6 ft 5 in)
- Position: Forward

Team information
- Current team: Achilles '29

Youth career
- VV SIOL
- –2002: JVC Cuijk
- 2002–2005: PSV
- 2005–2012: JVC Cuijk

Senior career*
Years	Team	Apps	(Gls)
2012–2015	JVC Cuijk	40	(6)
2015–2016	Juliana '31	26	(29)
2016–2017	Lienden	16	(0)
2017–2018	JVC Cuijk	51	(38)
2018–2019	Telstar	7	(0)
2019–2020	Kozakken Boys	12	(1)
2020	→ ASWH (loan)	6	(1)
2020–2021	DOVO	5	(5)
2022	Bentleigh Greens	9	(2)
2022	UDI '19	3	(0)
2023–2026	JVC Cuijk	76	(68)
2026–	Achilles '29		
- * Club domestic league appearances and goals as of 05:43, 19 November 2026 (UTC)

Jordie van der Laan (born 28 October 1993) is a Dutch footballer who plays as a forward for Achilles '29.

== Club career ==
Van der Laan played youth football for JVC Cuijk. Between 2002 and 2005, he was part of the PSV youth academy. He then returned to JVC Cuijk, where he played with the first team in the Topklasse Sunday from 2012 to 2015. In 2015, he left for Juliana '31, and via FC Lienden he returned to JVC Cuijk in 2017.

In the summer of 2018, Van der Laan moved to DOVO, but a clause was included in his contract that he could leave if an offer from a professional club would come during this transfer period. This offer came from Telstar, and thus he left without playing for DOVO. He signed a one-year deal.

Van der Laan made his Eerste Divisie debut for Telstar on 17 August 2018 in a game against RKC Waalwijk, as a starter. In May 2019 Van der Laan was terminated by Telstar after falsely reporting as sick to training so that he could attend the semifinal match of the UEFA Champions League between Tottenham Hotspur and Ajax in London.

He signed with Kozakken Boys for the next season. From January 2020, Kozakken Boys put Van der Laan on loan at ASWH, a newly promoted team that was struggling at the bottom of the Tweede Divisie league. ASWH remained in the Tweede Divisie as the football season was terminated due to the COVID-19 pandemic in the Netherlands. Van der Laan moved to DOVO in the Derde Divisie ahead of the 2020–21 season. He left the club in April 2021, before the season was over, alongside Shanon Carmelia and Bo van Essen.
