= Jasper van Heertum =

Dutch footballer

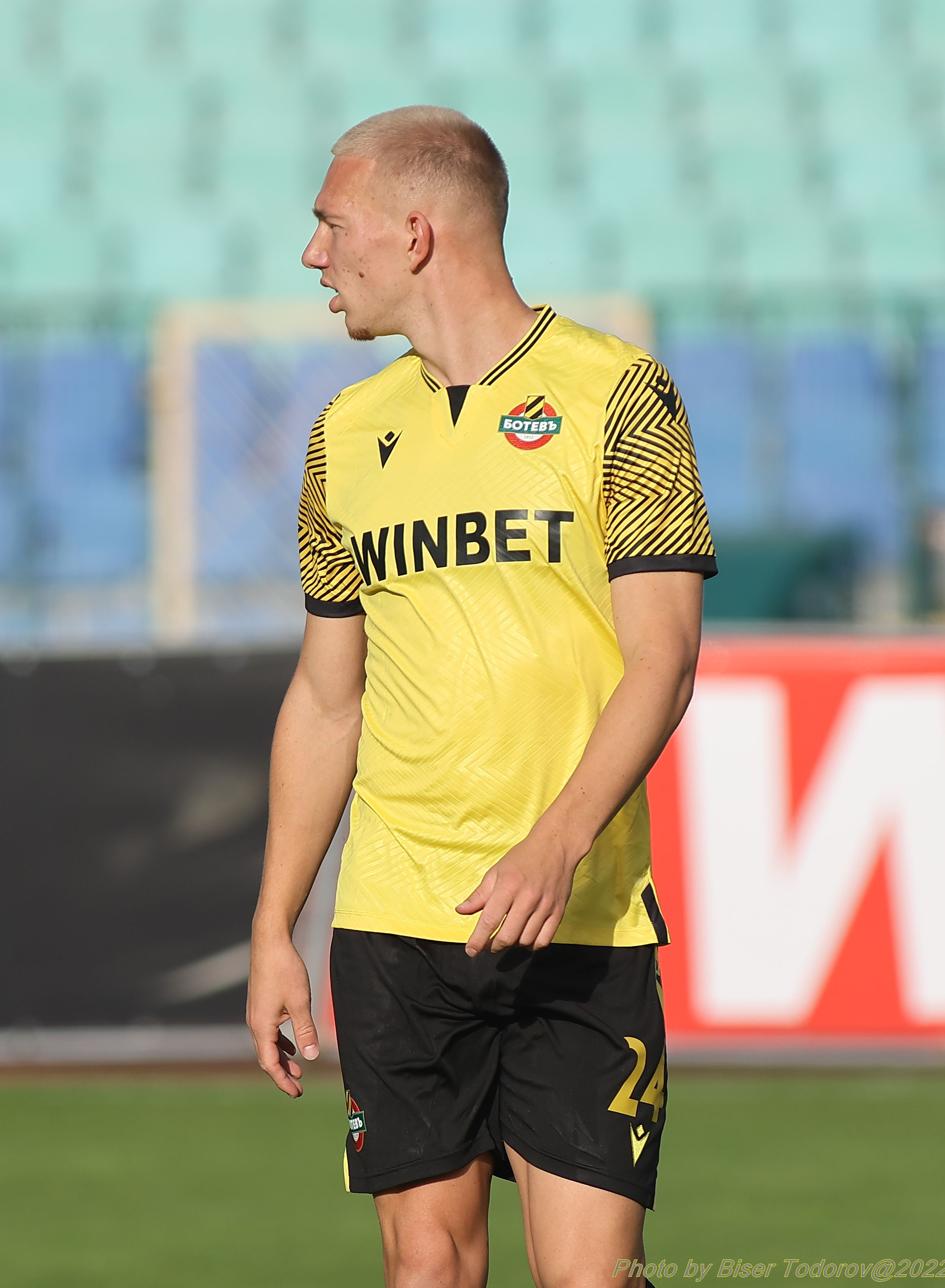
- Van Heertum with Botev Plovdiv

Personal information
- Date of birth: 10 November 1997 (age 29)
- Place of birth: Valkenswaard, Netherlands
- Height: 1.88 m (6 ft 2 in)
- Position: Centre-back

Team information
- Current team: FC Den Bosch
- Number: 4

Youth career
- RKVV Dommelen
- 2007–2013: PSV Eindhoven

Senior career*
| Years | Team | Apps | (Gls) |
| 2015–2017 | Lommel United | 5 | (0) |
| 2017–2019 | Telstar | 51 | (2) |
| 2019–2022 | De Graafschap | 91 | (14) |
| 2022–2025 | Botev Plovdiv | 31 | (0) |
| 2022–2025 | Botev Plovdiv II | 9 | (0) |
| 2026– | FC Den Bosch | 6 | (0) |
- * Club domestic league appearances and goals as of 3 October 2026

Jasper van Heertum (born 10 November 1997) is a Dutch professional footballer who plays as a centre-back.

== Career ==
Raised in Dommelen, Van Heertum made his fully professional Belgian First Division B debut for Lommel United on 8 October 2016 in a game against Tubize. He joined De Graafschap from Telstar in 2019. After a spell in Bulgaria he did not play for a year, only to be snapped up by FC Den Bosch in summer 2026.
