= Facundo Lescano =

Argentine footballer (born 1996)

Personal information
- Date of birth: 16 August 1996 (age 30)
- Place of birth: Mercedes, Argentina
- Height: 1.90 m (6 ft 3 in)
- Position: Forward

Team information
- Current team: Salernitana
- Number: 10

Youth career
- –2014: Genoa

Senior career*
Years	Team	Apps	(Gls)
2013–2014	Genoa	0	(0)
2014	→ Martina Franca (loan)	4	(0)
2014–2016	Torino	1	(0)
2015	→ Melfi (loan)	12	(0)
2016	→ Monopoli (loan)	7	(1)
2016	Igea Virtus	30	(15)
2017	Sambenedettese	38	(15)
2017–2018	→ Robur Siena (loan)	10	(0)
2018	→ Sicula Leonzio (loan)	17	(3)
2018	→ Telstar (loan)	7	(2)
2019	→ Potenza (loan)	13	(2)
2019–2020	Sicula Leonzio	29	(11)
2020–2021	Sambenedettese	38	(12)
2021–2022	Virtus Entella	32	(10)
2022–2024	Pescara	33	(19)
2023–2024	→ Triestina (loan)	37	(16)
2024–2025	Trapani	20	(12)
2025	→ Avellino (loan)	12	(6)
2025–2026	Avellino	11	(1)
2026	→ Salernitana (loan)	16	(8)
2026–	Salernitana	11	(1)
- * Club domestic league appearances and goals as of 20 July 2026

Facundo Lescano (born 18 August 1996) is an Argentine professional footballer who plays as a forward for Italian Serie C Group C club Salernitana. He also holds Italian and French nationalities.

== Career ==
Lescano is a youth exponent from Torino. He made his Serie A debut on 10 January 2015 against Milan. He replaced Matteo Darmian after 81 minutes in a 1–1 draw. After his experiences in the Italian third tier on loan at Melfi and Monopoli during the 2015–16 season, Lescano joined Igea Virtus, a Sicilian Serie D club, in September 2016. He scored his first goal with the new team against Sarnese in his first match.

On 14 August 2018, Lescano joined Telstar in the Netherlands on a season-long loan from Parma; Telstar held a buyout option at the end of the term.

On 12 January 2019, Lescano joined on loan to Potenza.

On 2 August 2019, he returned to Sicula Leonzio permanently, signing a 2-year contract.

On 29 August 2020, he moved for the second time to Sambenedettese, signing a contract for the term of 3 years with an option for 4th.

On 10 June 2021, he joined Virtus Entella.

On 12 July 2022, Lescano moved to Pescara, with Luca Clemenza moving in the opposite direction as part of the transfer.

On 6 August 2024, Lescano signed with Trapani.

On 28 January 2025, Lescano signed with Avellino on loan, with an obligation to buy.

On 23 January 2026, Lescano was loaned to Salernitana until the end of the season, with an obligation to buy. He also signed a contract with Salernitana until June 2029.

== Personal life ==
Lescano comes from a footballing family, his maternal grandfather Silvio Marzolini having been a star player for Boca Juniors and the Argentina national football team in the 1960s.

== Career statistics ==
As of match played 23 January 2026

Club	Season	League			Cup		Other		Total	
Club	Season	Division	Apps	Goals	Apps	Goals	Apps	Goals	Apps	Goals
Torino	2014–15	Serie A	1	0	0	0	—		1	0
Melfi (loan)	2015–16	Lega Pro	12	0	0	0	—		12	0
Monopoli (loan)	2016	Lega Pro	7	1	—		—		7	1
Igea Virtus	2016–17	Serie D	30	15	—		1 (Note: Appearance(s) in Promotion Playoffs)	0	31	15
Sambenedettese	2017	Serie D	10	15	—		—		10	15
Sicula Leonzio (loan)	2018	Serie C	17	3	—		1	0	18	3
Telstar (loan)	2018–19	Eerste Divisie	7	2	1	0	—		8	2
Potenza (loan)	2018–19	Serie C	13	2	—		4	2	17	4
Sicula Leonzio	2019–20	Serie C	29	11	—		2 (Note: Appearance(s) in Relegation Playoffs)	0	31	11
Sambenedettese	2020–21	Serie C	38	12	1	0	1	0	40	12
Virtus Entella	2021–22	Serie C	32	10	1	0	2	0	35	10
Pescara	2022–23	Serie C	33	19	—		5	1	38	20
Triestina (loan)	2023–24	Serie C	37	16	—		1	0	38	16
Trapani	2024–25	Serie C	20	12	4	1	—		24	13
Avellino (loan)	2024–25	Serie C	12	6	—		2 (Note: Appearance(s) in Supercoppa Serie C)	1	14	7
Avellino	2025–26	Serie B	11	1	1	0	—		12	1
Salernitana (loan)	2025–26	Serie C	0	0	0	0	—		0	0
Total Career			309	125	8	1	19	4	336	130

== Honours ==
=== Club ===
Torino

- Campionato Primavera: 2014–15

Avellino

- Serie C: 2024–25 (Group C)
