= Gustavo Hemkemeier =

Brazilian footballer (born 1997)

Personal information
- Full name: Gustavo Alexandre Hemkemeier
- Date of birth: 19 June 1997 (age 29)
- Place of birth: Toledo, Brazil
- Height: 1.78 m (5 ft 10 in)
- Position: Midfielder

Team information
- Current team: Union Titus Pétange
- Number: 19

Senior career*
Years	Team	Apps	(Gls)
2018–2020	Toledo	12	(1)
2018	→ Próspera (loan)		
2019	→ Brusque (loan)	7	(0)
2020–2022	Etzella	53	(19)
2022–2024	Swift Hesperange	12	(1)
2024–2025	Wiltz 71	28	(2)
2025–	Union Titus Pétange	19	(4)
- * Club domestic league appearances and goals as of 13 June 2026

Gustavo Alexandre Hemkemeier (born 19 June 1997) is a Brazilian footballer who plays as a midfielder for Union Titus Pétange.

== Career ==
=== Club career ===
Hemkemeier started his career with Brazilian top flight side Toledo, where he made 13 appearances and scored 1 goal. On 21 January 2018, he debuted for Toledo during a 1–0 win over Cascavel. On 29 January 2020, Hemkemeier scored his first goal for Toledo during a 1–3 loss to Londrina. In 2018, he was sent on loan to Próspera in the Brazilian third tier. In 2020, Hemkemeier signed for Luxembourgish club Etzella.

=== International career ===
He is eligible to represent Luxembourg internationally.
