= Rodny Lopes Cabral =

Footballer (born 1995)

- Rodny Lopes Cabral training with Feyenoord in 2015

Personal information
- Date of birth: 28 January 1995 (age 31)
- Place of birth: Rotterdam, Netherlands
- Height: 1.72 m (5 ft 8 in)
- Position: Right-back

Youth career
- RVV AGE
- –2007: SVV
- 2007–2008: Spartaan'20
- 2008–2015: Feyenoord

Senior career*
Years	Team	Apps	(Gls)
2016–2017	RVVH		
2017–2019	Telstar	68	(2)
2019–2021	Politehnica Iași	29	(1)
2022–2023	SVV Scheveningen	22	(0)
2023–2024	SteDoCo	17	(1)

International career^{‡}
2012–2013	Netherlands U18	3	(0)
2013	Netherlands U19	3	(0)
2019	Cape Verde	1	(0)
- * Club domestic league appearances and goals as of 10 July 2024 ‡ National team caps and goals as of 19 October 2019

Rodny Lopes Cabral (born 28 January 1995) is a professional footballer who plays as a right-back. Born in the Netherlands, Lopes Cabral has played for the Cape Verde national football team.

== Club career ==
On 18 August 2017, Lopes Cabral made his professional debut in the Eerste Divisie, in a game for Telstar against FC Eindhoven.

On 23 July 2019, Lopes Cabral moved to Liga I club Politehnica Iași and signed a two-year contract with the Romanian side.

== International career ==
Born in the Netherlands, Lopes Cabral is of Cape Verdean descent. He debuted for the Cape Verde national team in a friendly 2–1 win over Togo on 10 October 2019.

== Personal life ==
Rodny is the older brother of Cape Verde international Sidny Lopes Cabral.
