= Danny van Haaren =

Dutch footballer

Personal information
- Date of birth: 21 September 1997 (age 29)
- Place of birth: Rotterdam, Netherlands
- Height: 1.73 m (5 ft 8 in)
- Position: Midfielder

Team information
- Current team: SteDoCo
- Number: 6

Youth career
- –2010: Excelsior
- 2010–2016: Feyenoord

Senior career*
Years	Team	Apps	(Gls)
2016–2017	Almere City	29	(3)
2017–2018	Jong Cambuur	10	(1)
2018–2019	Telstar	18	(0)
2019–2022	Katwijk	23	(1)
2022	TEC	15	(0)
2023–	SteDoCo	67	(10)

International career
2012	Netherlands U15	3	(1)
2012–2013	Netherlands U16	9	(1)
2013	Netherlands U17	6	(0)
- * Club domestic league appearances and goals as of 02:13, 4 August 2025 (UTC)

Danny van Haaren (born 21 September 1997) is a Dutch footballer who plays as a midfielder for SteDoCo.

== Club career ==
He made his Eerste Divisie debut for Telstar on 17 August 2018 in a game against RKC, as an 81st-minute substitute for Senne Lynen. He turned amateur when joining Tweede Divisie outfit Katwijk in 2019 and later played for TEC and village team SteDoCo.

== International career ==
Van Haaren played 6 games for the Netherlands national under-17 football team.

== Personal life ==
His older brother Ricky van Haaren is also a footballer.
