= Elvio van Overbeek =

Dutch footballer (born 1994)

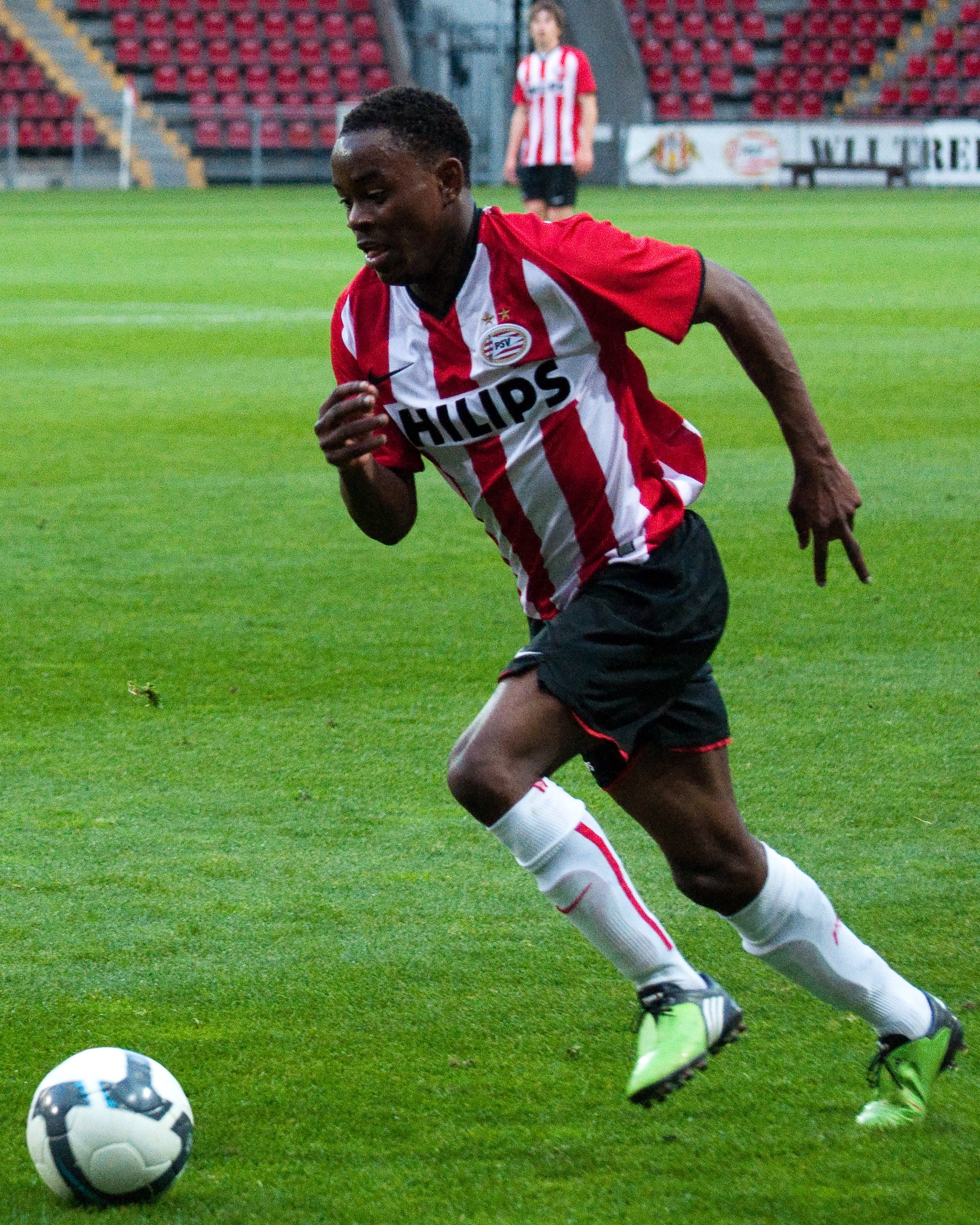
- van Overbeek playing for PSV U19 in April 2010

Personal information
- Full name: Elvio Do Rosario van Overbeek
- Date of birth: 11 January 1994 (age 32)
- Place of birth: Buco-Zau, Angola
- Height: 1.74 m (5 ft 9 in)
- Position: Winger

Youth career
- 2013–2015: PSV

Senior career*
Years	Team	Apps	(Gls)
2013–2015	PSV	0	(0)
2013–2015	Jong PSV	71	(11)
2015–2016	Go Ahead Eagles	23	(2)
2016–2017	→ De Graafschap (loan)	30	(4)
2017–2018	De Graafschap	43	(0)
2019	Telstar	3	(0)
2019–2020	Glentoran	30	(3)
2020–2021	De Treffers	0	(0)
2021–2022	Kozakken Boys	16	(0)
2022–2023	SteDoCo	30	(3)

International career
2011–2012	Netherlands U18	2	(0)
2013	Netherlands U19	1	(0)
2013–2014	Netherlands U20	5	(1)
2015	Netherlands U21	3	(1)
- * Club domestic league appearances and goals as of 3 March 2023

Elvio Do Rosario van Overbeek (born 11 January 1994) is a Dutch footballer who most recently played as a winger for SteDoCo.

== Career ==
Van Overbeek was born in Angola. He made his professional debut as Jong PSV player in the second division on 3 August 2013 against Sparta Rotterdam.

He signed for Northern Irish club Glentoran on 6 August 2019. After one season there, he returned to the Netherlands to sign for third-tier Tweede Divisie club De Treffers in October 2020. However, as the competition was on hiatus due to COVID-19, he never played for De Treffers. Van Overbeek joined Kozakken Boys in October 2021. He made his debut for the club on 30 October in a 2–1 loss in the Tweede Divisie to TEC.
