= Adham El Idrissi =

Dutch footballer

Personal information
- Date of birth: 17 March 1997 (age 29)
- Place of birth: Amsterdam, Netherlands
- Height: 1.70 m (5 ft 7 in)
- Position: Winger

Team information
- Current team: Pétange (on loan from Differdange)
- Number: 34

Youth career
- –2006: Zeeburgia
- 2006–2016: Ajax

Senior career*
Years	Team	Apps	(Gls)
2016–2017	Jong Ajax	6	(1)
2017–2018	De Dijk	17	(4)
2018–2019	Telstar	19	(0)
2020	Kalamata	5	(0)
2022	GVVV	18	(10)
2022–2023	TEC	29	(7)
2023	Kozani	4	(0)
2024	Victoria Rosport	16	(9)
2024–	Differdange	44	(11)
2026–	→ UT Pétange (loan)	7	(1)

International career
2014–2015	Netherlands U18	5	(0)
- * Club domestic league appearances and goals as of 13 June 2026

Adham El Idrissi (born 17 March 1997) is a Dutch professional footballer who plays as a winger for Union Titus Pétange, on loan from Differdange in Luxembourg.

He has been likened to former AFC Ajax player Luis Suárez due to their similar style of play.

== Career ==
El Idrissi is a youth exponent from AFC Ajax. He made his professional debut at Jong Ajax on 8 August 2016 in an Eerste Divisie game against FC Emmen. In January 2017 El Idrissi was released after a knee injury had sidelined him for months. He returned to play football at amateur side De Dijk and then joined Eerste Divisie outfit Telstar.

In 2022 he joined TEC from fellow amateurs GVVV. Later he moved to Luxembourg and played for Victoria Rosport and Differdange, who loaned him to UT Pétange in February 2026.

== Personal life ==
Born in the Netherlands, El Idrissi is of Moroccan descent. He is a former youth international for the Netherlands.
