= Kick Groot =

Dutch footballer

Personal information
- Date of birth: 5 April 1998 (age 28)
- Place of birth: Koog aan de Zaan, Netherlands
- Height: 1.83 m (6 ft 0 in)
- Position: Centre back

Team information
- Current team: Noordwijk
- Number: 17

Youth career
- Zaandijk
- KFC Koog aan de Zaan
- 2009–2017: AZ

Senior career*
Years	Team	Apps	(Gls)
2017–2018	Jong AZ	12	(0)
2018–2021	Telstar	9	(0)
2021–2023	ODIN '59	6	(0)
2023–	Noordwijk	59	(0)
- * Club domestic league appearances and goals as of 16 July 2025

Kick Groot (born 5 April 1998) is a Dutch footballer who plays as a centre back for Noordwijk in the Tweede Divisie. He is the grandson of former football player Cees Groot and related to 1960s Ajax star, Henk Groot.

== Club career ==
He made his Eerste Divisie debut for Jong AZ on 25 August 2017 in a game against RKC Waalwijk.

Groot moved to SC Telstar in April 2018. He would be plagued by injuries during his time at the club, only making nine league appearances during his three-year stint.

On 3 September 2021, Groot signed with ODIN '59 in the Derde Divisie after his contract with Telstar expired. Later he joined fellow amateurs Noordwijk.
