= Zaandijk =

- Town
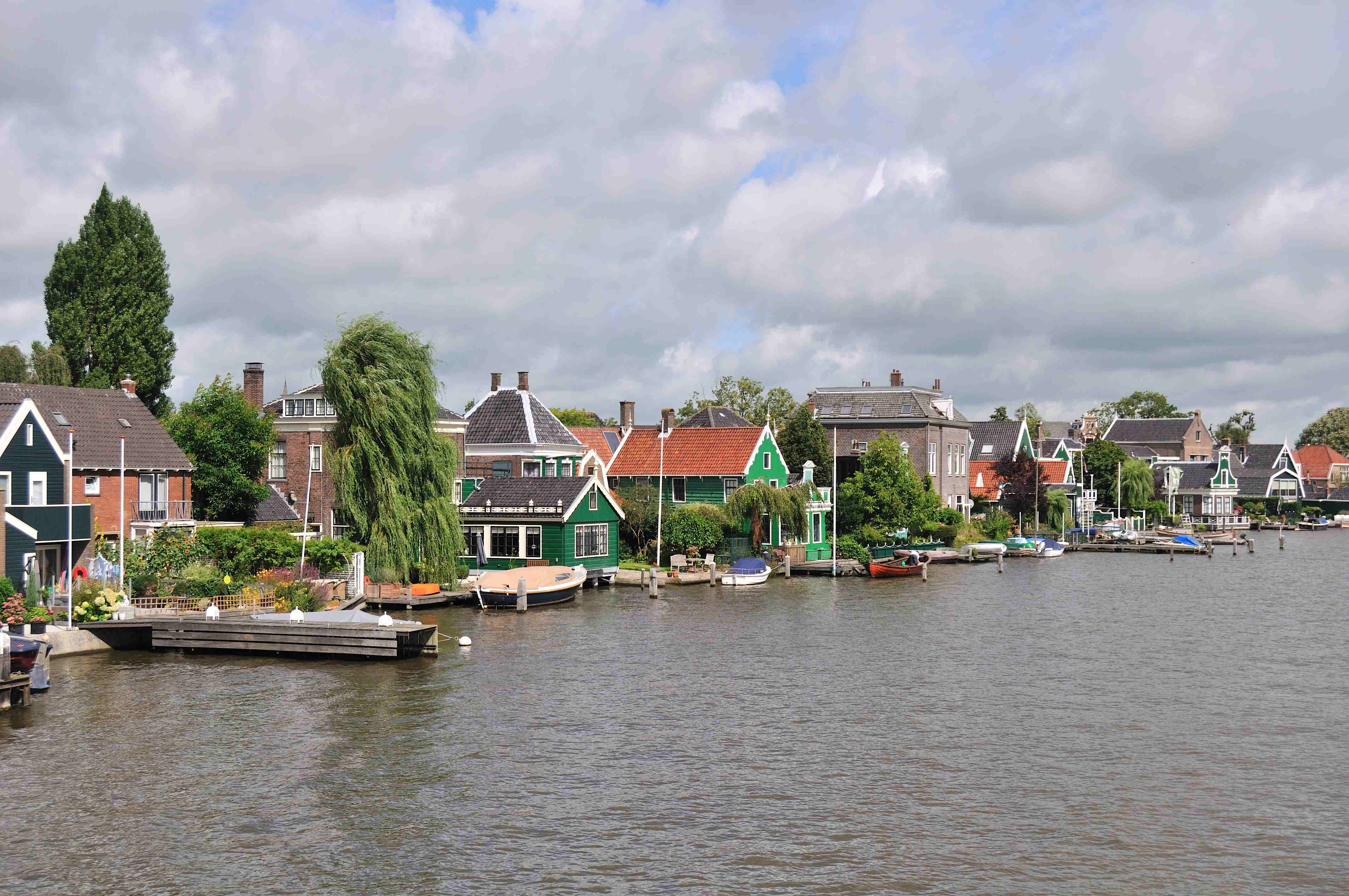
- A view of Zaandijk's Gortershoek

- Flag Coat of arms

- Location in the Netherlands Location in the province of North Holland in the Netherlands
- Coordinates: 52°28′N 4°48′E
- Country: Netherlands
- Province: North Holland
- Municipality: Zaanstad

Area
  - Total: 2.15 km^{2} (0.83 sq mi)
- Elevation: −0.4 m (−1.3 ft)

Population (2021)
  - Total: 8,600
  - Density: 4,000/km^{2} (10,000/sq mi)
- Demonym: Zaandijker
- Time zone: UTC+1 (CET)
  - Summer (DST): UTC+2 (CEST)
- Postal code: 1544
- Dialing code: 075

Zaandijk (Dutch pronunciation: [zaːnˈdɛik]) is a town in the municipality of Zaanstad, province of North Holland, Netherlands. It lies about 11 kilometres (6.8 miles) northwest of Amsterdam and had a population of 8,686 in 2017. Zaandijk is one of the smallest villages in Zaanstad, having a surface area of 209 hectare.

== History ==
The Pietersz family moved into "de Lage dijk" (The Lower Dike) in 1494 and became the first residents of Zaandijk. In Zaandijk, De Lagedijk is still extant. In 1570 the town consisted of 19 houses. These dwellings were burned by the Spaniards in 1572, during the Eighty Years' War. The town began to prosper and grow following the return of the populace.

Zaandijk was a separate municipality until 1974, when it became a part of the new municipality Zaanstad.

== Notable people ==
- Anna Maria Tobbe (1838–1886) was one of the first female Dutch pharmacists.

== Gallery ==
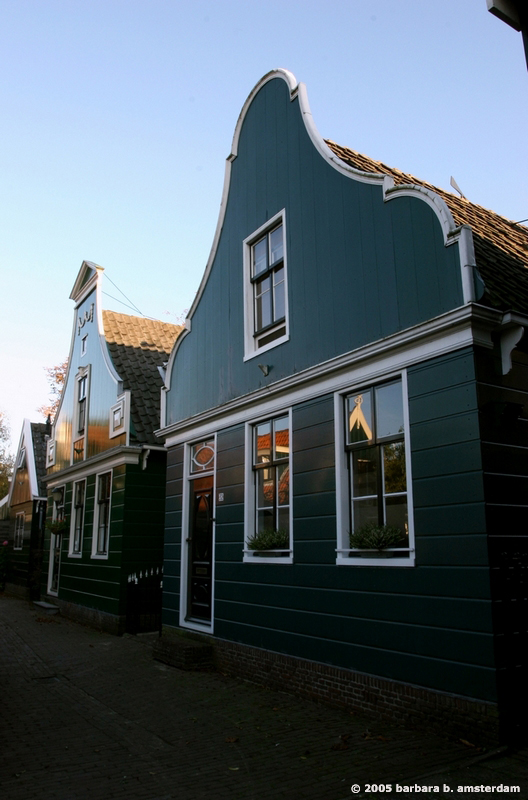
Zaandijk

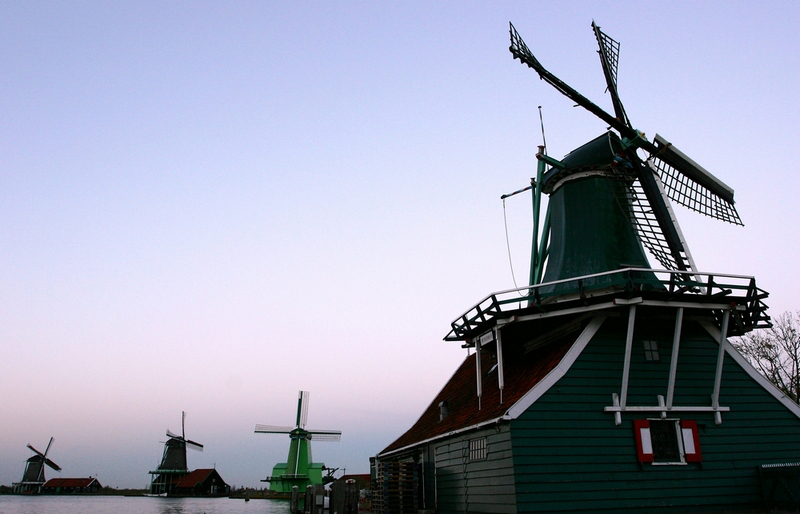
Typical Dutch windmills at sunset, Zaanse Schans

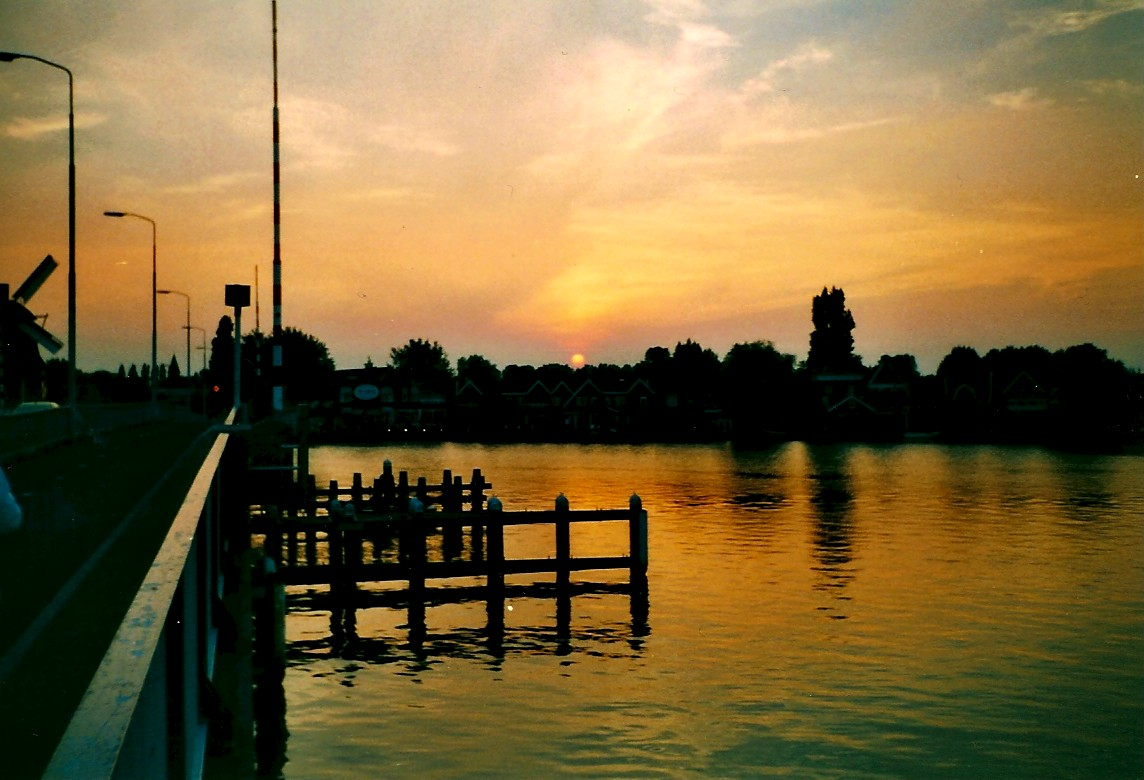
Sunset on the river Zaan in Zaanstad
