= Union Titus Pétange =

Association football club in Luxembourg

- Full name: Union Titus Pétange
- Nickname: UTP
- Founded: 29 April 2015; 11 years ago
- Ground: Stade Municipal, Pétange
- Capacity: 2,400
- Chairman: Jean-Paul Duarte
- Manager: Akil Momade
- League: Division of Honour
- 2025–26: National Division, 15th of 16 (relegated)
- Website: www.utp.lu
| Home colours | Away colours |

Union Titus Pétange is a football club, based in Pétange, in south-western Luxembourg. They currently compete in the Division of Honour, the second tier of Luxembourgish football.

The team was created in April 2015 as a merger of CS Pétange and FC Titus Lamadelaine who were at that time both playing in the Luxembourg Division of Honour.

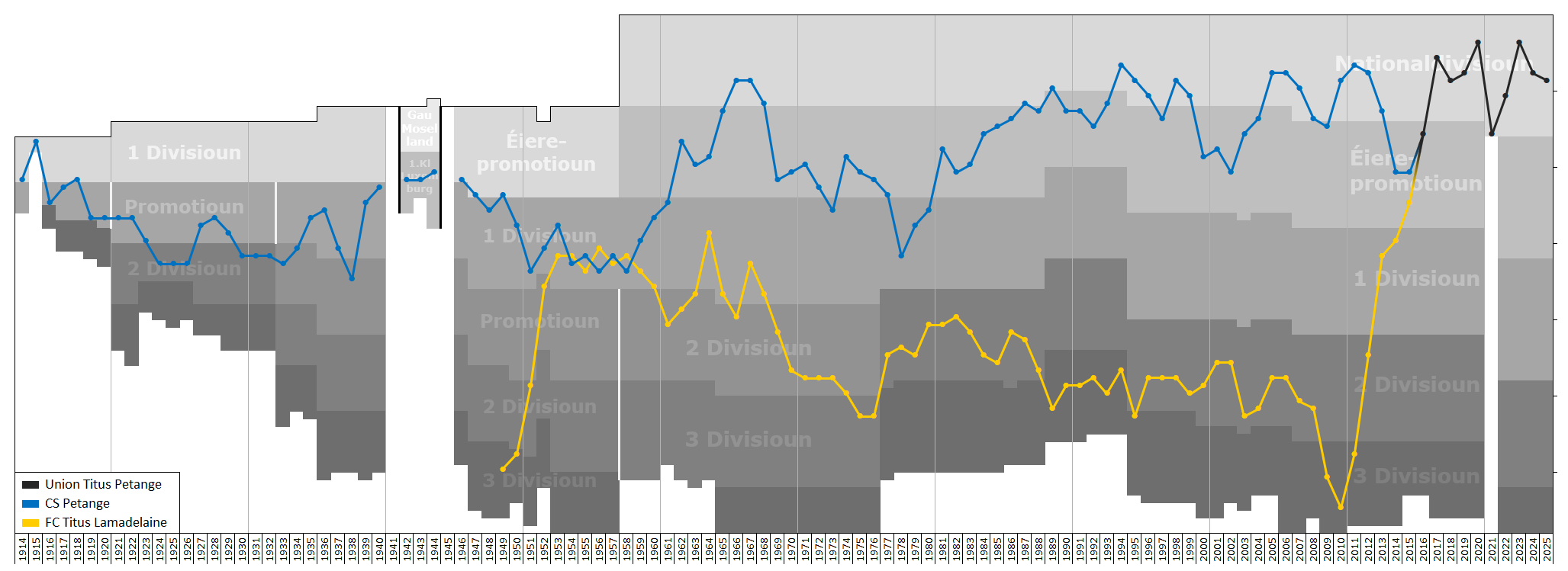
Historical league performance chart of Union Titus Pétange

== European record ==
As of 27 August 2020

| Season | Competition | Round | Club | Home | Away | Agg. |
|---|---|---|---|---|---|---|
| 2020–21 | UEFA Europa League | 1Q | (Gibraltar) Lincoln Red Imps | —N/a | 0–2 | —N/a |

Notes

- QR: Qualifying round

== Current squad ==
As of 7 February, 2026

Note: Flags indicate national team as defined under FIFA eligibility rules; some limited exceptions apply. Players may hold more than one non-FIFA nationality.

| No. | Pos. | Nation | Player |
|---|---|---|---|
| 1 | GK | LUX | André Barrela |
| 2 | DF | GER | Ayoub Erraji |
| 3 | DF | GER | Noé Vechviroon |
| 4 | DF | CMR | Steve Noode (on loan from Schalke 04) |
| 5 | DF | FRA | Yanis Zodehougan |
| 6 | MF | LUX | Dino Šabotić |
| 7 | FW | LUX | Yannick Schaus |
| 8 | DF | FRA | Jérémy Mawatu |
| 9 | FW | KOS | Arian Kastrati |
| 10 | MF | BEL | Marouane Balouk |
| 11 | FW | CIV | Isaac Ako |
| 14 | DF | GER | Mustafa Kourouma |
| 15 | FW | POR | Gonçalo Ferreira |
| 17 | FW | LUX | Ruben Matheus |

| No. | Pos. | Nation | Player |
|---|---|---|---|
| 18 | GK | LUX | Max Komes |
| 19 | MF | BRA | Gustavo Hemkemeier |
| 21 | MF | FRA | Saïd Arab |
| 22 | MF | FRA | Jean-Nathan Fanoux |
| 23 | FW | POR | Nuno Martins |
| 24 | FW | GER | Pepe Mendes |
| 27 | FW | FRA | Dalil Ali |
| 34 | FW | NED | Adham El Idrissi |
| 44 | MF | BEL | Florent Beguin |
| 70 | MF | GER | Till Hermandung |
| 77 | DF | BEL | Noa Lagnard |
| 88 | MF | FRA | Bakary Sissoko |
| — | FW | FRA | Soufiane Dris |

=== Out on loan ===
Note: Flags indicate national team as defined under FIFA eligibility rules; some limited exceptions apply. Players may hold more than one non-FIFA nationality.

| No. | Pos. | Nation | Player |

== Current staff ==
- (Portugal) Manager: Akil Momade (12 Jan 2025 – )
- (Mali) Assistant Coach: Noumouke Sissoko (1 Jul 2022 – )
- (Belgium) Fitness Coach: Jérôme Challe (1 Jul 2022 – )
- (France) Coach Goalkeeper: Landry Bonnefoi (11 Mar 2020 – )
