= Elso Brito =

Cape Verdean footballer (born 1994)

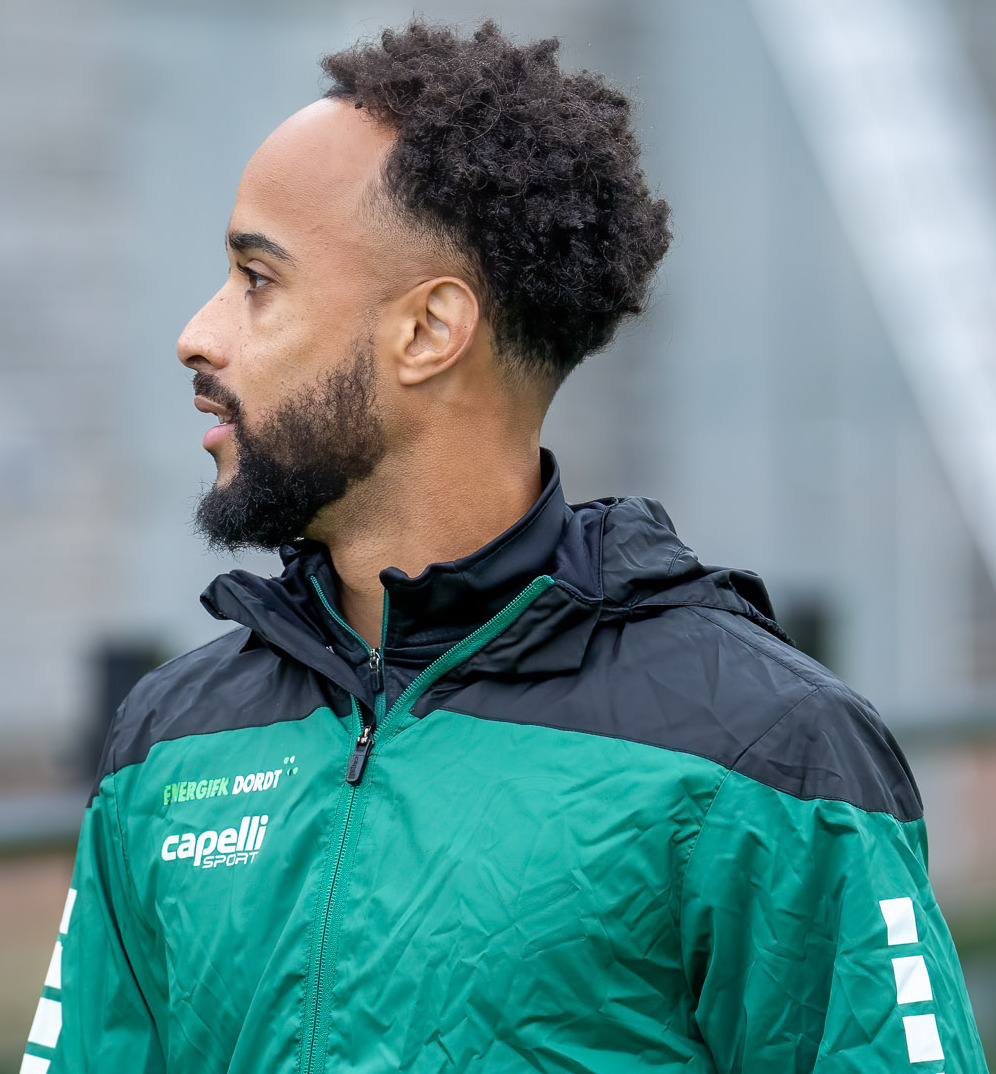

Personal information
- Date of birth: 2 April 1994 (age 32)
- Place of birth: Rotterdam, Netherlands
- Height: 1.78 m (5 ft 10 in)
- Positions: Left midfielder; left-back

Team information
- Current team: Zwaluwen
- Number: 5

Youth career
- RVV HOV
- Excelsior

Senior career*
Years	Team	Apps	(Gls)
2013–2017	Excelsior	12	(0)
2017–2019	Telstar	70	(0)
2019–2021	Go Ahead Eagles	22	(0)
2021–2022	Wigry Suwałki	18	(1)
2022–2024	Dordrecht	43	(1)
2025–	Zwaluwen	0	(0)

International career
2014	Netherlands U20	1	(0)
2018–2019	Cape Verde	2	(0)
- * Club domestic league appearances and goals as of 15 January 2026

Elso Brito (born 2 April 1994) is a professional footballer who plays as a left back for Derde Divisie club Zwaluwen Vlaardingen. Born in the Netherlands, he played for the Cape Verde national team.

== Club career ==
On 26 June 2022, Brito signed a two-year contract with Eerste Divisie club Dordrecht.

== International career ==
Brito was born in the Netherlands to Cape Verdean parents. He made his debut in a 0–0 (4–3) penalty shootout win over Andorra on 3 June 2018.

== Career statistics ==
=== Club ===
As of match played 29 March 2024

Appearances and goals by club, season and competition
Club	Season	League			National cup		Other		Total	
Club	Season	Division	Apps	Goals	Apps	Goals	Apps	Goals	Apps	Goals
Excelsior	2013–14	Eerste Divisie	5	0	0	0	0	0	5	0
Excelsior	2014–15	Eredivisie	6	0	2	0	0	0	8	0
Excelsior	2015–16	Eredivisie	0	0	0	0	0	0	0	0
Excelsior	2016–17	Eredivisie	1	0	0	0	0	0	1	0
Excelsior	Total		12	0	2	0	0	0	14	0
Telstar	2017–18	Eerste Divisie	37	0	1	0	2 (Note: Appearances in Eerste Divisie promotion play-offs)	0	40	0
Telstar	2018–19	Eerste Divisie	33	0	1	0	0	0	34	0
Telstar	Total		70	0	2	0	2	0	74	0
Go Ahead Eagles	2019–20	Eerste Divisie	22	0	4	0	0	0	26	0
Wigry Suwałki	2020–21	II liga	4	1	0	0	0	0	4	1
Wigry Suwałki	2021–22	II liga	14	0	0	0	0	0	14	0
Wigry Suwałki	Total		18	1	0	0	0	0	18	1
Dordrecht	2022–23	Eerste Divisie	28	1	0	0	0	0	28	1
Dordrecht	2023–24	Eerste Divisie	13	0	2	0	0	0	15	0
Dordrecht	Total		41	1	2	0	0	0	43	1
Career total			163	2	10	0	2	0	175	2

=== International ===
As of match played 10 October 2019

Appearances and goals by national team and year
National team	Year	Apps	Goals
Cape Verde	2018	1	0
Cape Verde	2019	1	0
Total		2	0
