= SC Bettembourg =

Association football club in Luxembourg

- Full name: Sporting Club Bettembourg
- Founded: 20 October 1927; 99 years ago
- Ground: Stade Municipal, Bettembourg
- Capacity: 1,500
- Chairman: Patrick Hutmacher
- Manager: Olivier Baudry
- League: Division of Honour
- 2025–26: Division of Honour, 5th of 16
- Website: sc-bettembourg.com
Home colours	Away colours

SC Bettembourg is a football club based in Bettembourg, Luxembourg. They currently compete in the Division of Honour, the second tier of Luxembourgish football.

== History ==
The club was founded in 1927 as Sporting Club Bettemburg. After the German occupation of Luxembourg in 1940, it was renamed FK 1927 Bettemburg and four years later it was renamed back to its original name.

In the 1947–48 and 1972–73 seasons, SC Bettembourg played in the highest Luxembourg league, Luxembourg National Division, for one season each. After relegation in 1973, the club moved between the honorary promotion and the fourth-tier 2nd Division. In 2024, the club managed to return to the top division after 51 years, four match days before the end of the season.

Historical chart of the club's league performance

In the Coupe de Luxembourg, the national cup competition, reaching the round of 16 several times was the club's greatest success to date.

== Current squad ==
As of 8 April, 2026

Note: Flags indicate national team as defined under FIFA eligibility rules; some limited exceptions apply. Players may hold more than one non-FIFA nationality.

No.	Pos.	Nation	Player
3	MF	CPV	David Silva
4	DF	LUX	Adriano Scholtes
5	MF	ITA	Sergio Ayena
6	MF	GBS	João Jaquité
8	MF	LUX	Maxime Gonçalves
9	FW	LUX	Lissander da Costa
10	FW	LUX	Ricardo Couto Pinto
11	FW	FRA	Marck Amoakon
12	DF	POR	Joãozinho Gomes
13	MF	FRA	Loïc Muller
17	DF	FRA	Hearvin Djetou

No.	Pos.	Nation	Player
21	FW	MLI	Mohamed Guilavogui
23	MF	FRA	Jordi Merino
25	FW	BEL	Bigen Yala Lusala
27	MF	FRA	Benson Obeng
30	GK	POR	Rui Nibra
32	MF	LUX	Dylan Ribeiro
33	MF	FRA	Kevin Mvele
34	MF	FRA	Abdelkarim Idha
57	DF	CPV	Romario
63	MF	CIV	Kódjo Kassé Alphonse
88	MF	LUX	Andre Moreira
93	GK	LUX	Boris Bassene
