= 2005 FIFA U-17 World Championship squads =

Players in boldface have now been capped at full international level.

== Group A ==
=== Peru ===
Head coach: (Argentina) José Luis Pavoni

No.	Pos.	Player	Date of birth (age)	Caps	Club
1	GK	Wilfredo Caballero	14 May 1988 (aged 17)		(Peru) Universitario
2	DF	**Christian Ramos**	4 November 1988 (aged 16)		(Peru) Sporting Cristal
3	DF	Ricardo Uribe	9 October 1988 (aged 16)		(Peru) Alianza Lima
4	DF	Christian Laura	13 February 1988 (aged 17)		(Peru) Sporting Cristal
5	DF	**Kerwin Peixoto**	21 February 1988 (aged 17)		(Peru) Alianza Lima
6	MF	Luis Galliquio	22 August 1988 (aged 17)		(Peru) Sporting Cristal
7	DF	José Mesarina	15 November 1988 (aged 16)		(Peru) Alianza Lima
8	MF	**Gianfranco Espejo**	4 March 1988 (aged 17)		(Peru) Sporting Cristal
9	FW	**Daniel Chávez**	8 January 1988 (aged 17)		(Peru) Academia Cantolao
10	FW	Carlos Elías	23 March 1988 (aged 17)		(Peru) Alianza Lima
11	FW	Javier Carnero	13 July 1988 (aged 17)		(Peru) Sporting Cristal
12	GK	Gian Franco Castellanos	8 April 1988 (aged 17)		(Peru) Sporting Cristal
13	MF	**Carlos Zambrano**	10 July 1989 (aged 16)		(Peru) Academia Cantolao
14	FW	Jesús Rey	9 February 1988 (aged 17)		(Peru) Universitario
15	MF	Miguel Cárdenas	31 May 1988 (aged 17)		(Peru) Alianza Lima
16	MF	Carlos Flores	9 January 1988 (aged 17)		(Peru) Alianza Lima
17	MF	**Josepmir Ballón**	21 March 1988 (aged 17)		(Peru) Academia Cantolao
18	MF	Walter Portugal	9 March 1988 (aged 17)		(Peru) Alianza Lima
19	GK	Bruno Enriquez	13 May 1988 (aged 17)		(Peru) Alianza Lima
20	DF	José Zavala	14 December 1988 (aged 16)		(Peru) Academia Cantolao

=== Ghana ===
Head coach: (Ghana) David Duncan

No.	Pos.	Player	Date of birth (age)	Caps	Club
1	GK	**Ernest Sowah**	31 March 1988 (aged 17)		(Ghana) Soccer Mercenaries
2	DF	Emmanuel Adjetey	15 December 1988 (aged 16)		(Ghana) Ashanti Gold SC
3	FW	Razak Salifu	1 October 1988 (aged 16)		(Ghana) All Blacks
4	DF	James Tagoe	6 July 1988 (aged 17)		(Ghana) Chance for Children
5	DF	Ernest Danso	25 November 1989 (aged 15)		(Ghana) Nania FC
6	MF	**David Telfer**	1 December 1988 (aged 16)		(Ghana) Ashanti Gold SC
7	MF	**Mubarak Wakaso**	25 July 1990 (aged 15)		(Ghana) Ashanti Gold SC
8	DF	**Samad Oppong**	21 July 1988 (aged 17)		(Ghana) Corners Babies
9	FW	**Agyemang Opoku**	7 June 1989 (aged 16)		(Ghana) Ashanti Gold
10	FW	Sadat Bukari	12 April 1989 (aged 16)		(Ghana) Heart of Lions
11	DF	**Jonathan Quartey**	2 June 1988 (aged 17)		(Ghana) Heart of Lions
12	DF	**Emmanuel Ansong**	22 October 1989 (aged 15)		(Ghana) Great Olympics
13	MF	Francis Sogbe	8 March 1988 (aged 17)		(Ghana) Inter Allies
14	MF	Anthony Adarkwa	15 August 1989 (aged 16)		(Ghana) Nungua United
15	FW	Awudu Abubakar	16 October 1988 (aged 16)		(Ghana) State Envoys
16	GK	Seth Obodai	11 July 1989 (aged 16)		(Ghana) Winneba Academy
17	MF	Charles Boateng	14 December 1989 (aged 15)		(Ghana) Nania
18	FW	George Appiah	13 August 1989 (aged 16)		(Ghana) Liberty Professionals
19	GK	Nana Bonsu	1 December 1988 (aged 16)		(Ghana) Zaytuna
20	FW	**Ernest Asante**	6 November 1988 (aged 16)		(Ghana) Feyenoord Fetteh

=== China ===
Head coach: (China) Zhang Ning

No.	Pos.	Player	Date of birth (age)	Caps	Club
1	GK	**Wang Dalei**	10 January 1989 (aged 16)		(China) Dalian Tielu
2	DF	Cui Nanri	27 January 1988 (aged 17)		(China) Yanbian
3	DF	Tang Naixin	29 April 1988 (aged 17)		(China) Liaoning
4	MF	Li Linfeng	9 January 1988 (aged 17)		(China) Shandong Luneng
5	DF	Gu Cao	31 May 1988 (aged 17)		(China) Shanghai Shenhua
6	MF	Cai Yaohui	8 January 1988 (aged 17)		(China) Dongguan Nancheng
7	FW	**Yu Dabao**	18 April 1988 (aged 17)		(China) Qingdao Hailifeng
8	FW	Yang Jian	4 October 1988 (aged 16)		(China) Shenzhen Jianlibao
9	FW	Gu Jinjin	14 April 1989 (aged 16)		(China) Tianjin Teda
10	MF	Zhu Yifan	1 March 1988 (aged 17)		(China) Beijing Hyundai
11	GK	Zhang Xu	19 May 1988 (aged 17)		(China) Shandong Luneng
12	FW	**Wang Gang**	17 February 1989 (aged 16)		(China) Tianjin Teda
13	MF	Li Zhuangfei	24 January 1988 (aged 17)		(China) Shandong Luneng
14	MF	Du Longquan	29 May 1988 (aged 17)		(China) Liaoning
15	FW	Wang Xuanhong	24 July 1989 (aged 16)		(China) Liaoning
16	FW	**Deng Zhuoxiang**	24 October 1988 (aged 16)		(China) Wuhan Huanghelou
17	GK	**Chi Wenyi**	18 February 1988 (aged 17)		(China) Yanbian
18	FW	**Yang Xu**	12 February 1988 (aged 17)		(China) Liaoning
19	MF	Huang Jie	7 February 1989 (aged 16)		(China) Shanghai Shenhua
20	DF	Wang Weilong	24 February 1988 (aged 17)		(China) Shandong Luneng

=== Costa Rica ===
Head coach: (Costa Rica) Geovanni Alfaro

No.	Pos.	Player	Date of birth (age)	Caps	Club
1	GK	Alfonso Quesada	15 March 1988 (aged 17)		(Costa Rica) Alajuelense
2	DF	**David Myrie**	1 June 1988 (aged 17)		(Costa Rica) Liberia
3	DF	Rudy Dawson	8 May 1988 (aged 17)		(Costa Rica) Alajuelense
4	MF	Brayan Jimenez	15 March 1988 (aged 17)		(Costa Rica) Saprissa
5	DF	Carlos Chacon	3 June 1988 (aged 17)		(Costa Rica) Barrio México
6	DF	David Calvo	3 October 1988 (aged 16)		(Costa Rica) Alajuelense
7	MF	Roberto Carrillo	1 January 1988 (aged 17)		(Costa Rica) Saprissa
8	FW	**Celso Borges**	27 May 1988 (aged 17)		(Costa Rica) Saprissa
9	FW	Ariel Recinos	1 May 1988 (aged 17)		(Costa Rica) Brujas
10	MF	**Luis Diego Cordero**	21 May 1988 (aged 17)		(Costa Rica) Saprissa
11	FW	**Jean Carlos Solórzano**	8 January 1988 (aged 17)		(Costa Rica) Alajuelense
12	MF	Esteban Rodríguez	25 January 1988 (aged 17)		(Costa Rica) Liberia
13	DF	**Kendall Waston**	1 January 1988 (aged 17)		(Costa Rica) Saprissa
14	MF	Fernando Paniagua	9 September 1988 (aged 17)		(Costa Rica) Saprissa
15	DF	Alonso Vargas	5 April 1988 (aged 17)		(Costa Rica) Alajuelense
16	DF	Leslie Ramos	25 January 1988 (aged 17)		(Costa Rica) Alajuelense
17	FW	César Aguilar	7 October 1990 (aged 14)		(Costa Rica) Saprissa
18	GK	Armando Venegas	24 January 1988 (aged 17)		(Costa Rica) Saprissa
19	FW	Guillermo Guardia	24 April 1988 (aged 17)		(Costa Rica) Alajuelense
20	GK	Giancarlo Thompson	19 February 1988 (aged 17)		(Costa Rica) Liberia

== Group B ==
=== Uruguay ===
Head coach: (Uruguay) Gustavo Ferrín

No.	Pos.	Player	Date of birth (age)	Caps	Club
1	GK	Yonatan Irrazabal	12 February 1988 (aged 17)		(Uruguay) Defensor
2	MF	Gary Kagelmacher	21 April 1988 (aged 17)		(Uruguay) Danubio
3	DF	Martín Díaz	17 March 1988 (aged 17)		(Uruguay) Defensor
4	DF	Damián Suárez	27 April 1988 (aged 17)		(Uruguay) Defensor
5	DF	Alejandro González	23 March 1988 (aged 17)		(Uruguay) Peñarol
6	DF	Maximiliano Arias	3 October 1988 (aged 16)		(Uruguay) Peñarol
7	MF	Michel Acosta	14 February 1988 (aged 17)		(Uruguay) Paysandú
8	FW	Marcel Román	7 February 1988 (aged 17)		(Uruguay) Danubio
9	FW	Elías Figueroa	26 January 1988 (aged 17)		(Uruguay) Liverpool
10	FW	Gerardo Vonder Pütten	28 February 1988 (aged 17)		(Uruguay) Danubio
11	MF	Enzo Scorza	1 March 1988 (aged 17)		(Uruguay) Danubio
12	GK	Mauro Goicoechea	27 March 1988 (aged 17)		(Uruguay) Danubio
13	FW	Carlos Flores	4 February 1988 (aged 17)		(Uruguay) Defensor
14	DF	**Diego Arismendi**	25 January 1988 (aged 17)		(Uruguay) Nacional
15	MF	Christian Paz	28 January 1988 (aged 17)		(Uruguay) Nacional
16	MF	Marcelo González	18 July 1988 (aged 17)		(Uruguay) Danubio
17	FW	Santiago Álvarez	29 June 1989 (aged 16)		(Uruguay) Racing
18	FW	Vicente Olivera	27 July 1988 (aged 17)		(Uruguay) Danubio
19	MF	**Emiliano Alfaro**	28 April 1988 (aged 17)		(Uruguay) Liverpool
20	GK	Mathias Rolero	10 September 1988 (aged 17)		(Uruguay) Basañez

=== Mexico ===
Head coach: (Mexico) Jesús Ramírez

No.	Pos.	Player	Date of birth (age)	Caps	Club
1	GK	Sergio Arias	27 February 1988 (aged 17)		(Mexico) Guadalajara
2	DF	**Patricio Araujo**	30 January 1988 (aged 17)		(Mexico) Guadalajara
3	DF	**Efraín Juárez**	22 February 1988 (aged 17)		(Mexico) UNAM
4	DF	Christian Sánchez	4 April 1989 (aged 16)		(Mexico) Atlas
5	DF	**Héctor Moreno**	17 January 1988 (aged 17)		(Mexico) UNAM
6	DF	**Omar Esparza**	21 May 1988 (aged 17)		(Mexico) Guadalajara
7	MF	**Jorge Hernández**	11 February 1988 (aged 17)		(Mexico) Atlas
8	FW	**Giovani dos Santos**	11 May 1989 (aged 16)		(Spain) Barcelona
9	FW	**Carlos Vela**	1 March 1989 (aged 16)		(Mexico) Guadalajara
10	FW	Éver Guzmán	15 March 1988 (aged 17)		(Mexico) Morelia
11	MF	Mario Gallegos	15 April 1988 (aged 17)		(Mexico) Atlas
12	GK	Jesús Gallardo	16 January 1988 (aged 17)		(Mexico) Atlas
13	MF	**Édgar Andrade**	2 March 1988 (aged 17)		(Mexico) Cruz Azul
14	MF	Heriberto Beltrán	3 March 1988 (aged 17)		(Mexico) Pachuca
15	MF	Juan Carlos Silva	6 February 1988 (aged 17)		(Mexico) América
16	DF	**Adrián Aldrete**	14 June 1988 (aged 17)		(Mexico) Morelia
17	DF	Pedro Valverde	6 April 1988 (aged 17)		(Mexico) Cruz Azul
18	MF	**César Villaluz**	18 July 1988 (aged 17)		(Mexico) Cruz Azul
19	GK	Cristian Flores	30 April 1988 (aged 17)		(Mexico) Atlas
20	FW	**Enrique Esqueda**	19 April 1988 (aged 17)		(Mexico) America

=== Turkey ===
Head coach: (Turkey) Abdullah Avcı

No.	Pos.	Player	Date of birth (age)	Caps	Club
1	GK	**Volkan Babacan**	11 August 1988 (aged 17)		(Turkey) Fenerbahçe
2	DF	Mehmet Yılmaz	26 March 1988 (aged 17)		(Turkey) Bursaspor
3	DF	Ferhat Bıkmaz	6 July 1988 (aged 17)		(Germany) Hannover 96
4	DF	Erkan Ferin	20 March 1988 (aged 17)		(Turkey) Galatasaray
5	DF	Serdar Keşçi	18 January 1988 (aged 17)		(Turkey) Galatasaray
6	DF	Harun Karadaş	14 January 1988 (aged 17)		(Turkey) Galatasaray
7	FW	Deniz Yılmaz	26 February 1988 (aged 17)		(Germany) Bayern Munich
8	MF	**Caner Erkin**	4 October 1988 (aged 16)		(Russia) CSKA Moscow
9	FW	Tevfik Köse	12 July 1988 (aged 17)		(Germany) Bayer Leverkusen
10	MF	**Nuri Şahin**	5 September 1988 (aged 17)		(Germany) Borussia Dortmund
11	FW	Özgür Can Özcan	10 April 1988 (aged 17)		(Turkey) Galatasaray
12	GK	**Onur Kıvrak**	1 January 1988 (aged 17)		(Turkey) Karşıyaka
13	DF	Emre Balak	11 August 1988 (aged 17)		(Turkey) Samsunspor
14	MF	**Aydın Yılmaz**	29 January 1988 (aged 17)		(Turkey) Galatasaray
15	DF	Anıl Taşdemir	1 January 1988 (aged 17)		(Turkey) Göztepe
16	DF	Ergün Berisha	24 June 1988 (aged 17)		(Switzerland) Grasshopper
17	DF	Cengiz Çoban	20 January 1988 (aged 17)		(Turkey) Trabzonspor
18	MF	**Murat Duruer**	15 January 1988 (aged 17)		(Turkey) Ankaragücü
19	DF	**Aykut Demir**	22 October 1988 (aged 16)		(Netherlands) NAC Breda
20	GK	Eray Birniçan	20 July 1988 (aged 17)		(Turkey) Yıldırım Bosnaspor

=== Australia ===
Head coach: (Australia) Ange Postecoglou

No.	Pos.	Player	Date of birth (age)	Caps	Club
1	GK	Aleks Vrteski	28 September 1988 (aged 16)		(Australia) Sorrento
2	DF	Jamie Cumming	19 August 1988 (aged 17)		(Australia) Victorian Institute of Sport
3	DF	David D'Apuzzo	5 September 1988 (aged 17)		(Australia) Blacktown City
4	DF	Wade Oostendorp	20 April 1988 (aged 17)		(Australia) Sydney FC
5	DF	**Matthew Spiranovic**	27 June 1988 (aged 17)		(Australia) Victorian Institute of Sport
6	MF	Matthew Mullen	24 February 1989 (aged 16)		(Australia) Australian Institute of Sport
7	MF	Joel Allwright	4 March 1988 (aged 17)		(Australia) Australian Institute of Sport
8	FW	**Robbie Kruse**	5 October 1988 (aged 16)		(Australia) Queensland Academy of Sport
9	FW	**David Williams**	26 February 1988 (aged 17)		(Australia) Queensland Academy of Sport
10	MF	Kaz Patafta	25 October 1988 (aged 16)		(Australia) Australian Institute of Sport
11	FW	Daniel Miller	29 January 1988 (aged 17)		(Australia) Preston Lions
12	GK	Daniel Ireland	20 January 1989 (aged 16)		(Australia) New South Wales Institute of Sport
13	MF	Jason Trifiro	3 June 1988 (aged 17)		(Australia) Westfields Sports High School
14	FW	**Nathan Burns**	7 May 1988 (aged 17)		(Australia) Westfields Sports High School
15	DF	Blake Charity	27 February 1988 (aged 17)		(Australia) Queensland Academy of Sport
16	MF	**Scott Jamieson**	13 October 1988 (aged 16)		(England) Bolton Wanderers
17	MF	**Leigh Broxham**	13 January 1988 (aged 17)		(Australia) Victorian Institute of Sport
18	GK	Shanon Lancini	5 August 1988 (aged 17)		(Australia) Queensland Academy of Sport
19	MF	Matthew Hales	16 April 1990 (aged 15)		(Australia) Queensland Academy of Sport
20	MF	Brendan Maroney	6 May 1988 (aged 17)		(Australia) Blacktown City

== Group C ==
=== Ivory Coast ===
Head coach: (Ivory Coast) François Bohe

No.	Pos.	Player	Date of birth (age)	Caps	Club
1	GK	Ikossie Tahourou	25 December 1989 (aged 15)		(Ivory Coast) Academy Mimos-Sifcom
2	DF	Ali Keita	1 October 1988 (aged 16)		(Ivory Coast) CFDC
3	MF	Irenee Kouakou	20 March 1988 (aged 17)		(Ivory Coast) Academy Mimos-Sifcom
4	DF	Romaric Bosson	12 April 1988 (aged 17)		(Ivory Coast) Stella Club
5	DF	Marius Gnabouyou	8 December 1988 (aged 16)		(Ivory Coast) Academy Mimos-Sifcom
6	DF	Jules Agoussi	19 September 1990 (aged 14)		(Ivory Coast) Oryx
7	MF	Martial Yao	4 October 1989 (aged 15)		(Ivory Coast) Academy Mimos-Sifcom
8	MF	Pacome Kouadio	25 December 1988 (aged 16)		(Ivory Coast) Academy Mimos-Sifcom
9	FW	Koffi Kouassi	17 November 1989 (aged 15)		(Ivory Coast) CFDC
10	FW	Alassane Diomande	28 November 1988 (aged 16)		(Ivory Coast) Stella Club
11	FW	Ismaël Béko Fofana	8 September 1988 (aged 17)		(Ivory Coast) Academy Mimos-Sifcom
12	FW	Serge Kouadio	31 December 1988 (aged 16)		(Ivory Coast) Academy Mimos-Sifcom
13	DF	Zié Diabaté	2 March 1989 (aged 16)		(Ivory Coast) IFER
14	FW	Abdul Moustapha Ouédraogo	9 June 1988 (aged 17)		(Ivory Coast) Academy Mimos-Sifcom
15	MF	Diarra Vamara	16 February 1989 (aged 16)		(Ivory Coast) Stella Club
16	GK	Yves Andy	12 August 1988 (aged 17)		(Ivory Coast) Academy Mimos-Sifcom
17	FW	Gilbert Kouadio	17 December 1988 (aged 16)		(Ivory Coast) EFYM
18	DF	Siaka Bamba	24 August 1989 (aged 16)		(Ivory Coast) Oryx
19	FW	Boua Kourouma	26 April 1988 (aged 17)		(Ivory Coast) CFDC
20	GK	Ibrahim Koné	5 December 1989 (aged 15)		(Ivory Coast) Excellence

=== Italy ===
Head coach: (Italy) Francesco Rocca

No.	Pos.	Player	Date of birth (age)	Caps	Club
1	GK	Enrico Alfonso	4 May 1988 (aged 17)		(Italy) Chievo
2	DF	Davide Brivio	17 March 1988 (aged 17)		(Italy) Fiorentina
3	DF	**Lorenzo De Silvestri**	23 May 1988 (aged 17)		(Italy) Lazio
4	DF	Manuel Angelucci	18 January 1988 (aged 17)		(Italy) Ternana
5	DF	Michele Cremonesi	15 April 1988 (aged 17)		(Italy) Cremonese
6	MF	Daniele Greco	27 April 1988 (aged 17)		(Italy) Lazio
7	MF	Tommaso D'Attoma	15 April 1988 (aged 17)		(Italy) Lumezzane
8	MF	Simone Palermo	17 August 1988 (aged 17)		(Italy) Roma
9	FW	Christian Tiboni	6 April 1988 (aged 17)		(Italy) Atalanta
10	FW	Andrea Russotto	25 May 1988 (aged 17)		(Italy) Treviso
11	FW	Salvatore Foti	8 August 1988 (aged 17)		(Italy) Sampdoria
12	GK	Paolo Tornaghi	21 June 1988 (aged 17)		(Italy) Internazionale
13	DF	Fabio Franceschini	8 May 1988 (aged 17)		(Italy) Lecce
14	MF	Stefano Mauri	11 February 1988 (aged 17)		(Italy) Atalanta
15	MF	Matteo Mandorlini	22 October 1988 (aged 16)		(Italy) Parma
16	MF	Matteo Scozzarella	5 June 1988 (aged 17)		(Italy) Atalanta
17	MF	Michael Cia	3 August 1988 (aged 17)		(Italy) Südtirol
18	MF	Marco Mancosu	22 August 1988 (aged 17)		(Italy) Cagliari
19	FW	Marco Dalla Costa	25 March 1988 (aged 17)		(Italy) Internazionale
20	GK	Simone Santarelli	7 September 1988 (aged 17)		(Italy) Lazio

=== North Korea ===
Head coach: (North Korea) Jo Tong-sop

No.	Pos.	Player	Date of birth (age)	Caps	Club
1	GK	**Ju Kwang-min**	20 May 1990 (aged 15)		(North Korea) Kigwancha
2	DF	Yun Myong-song	21 April 1988 (aged 17)		(North Korea) Rimyongsu
3	DF	Pak In-gol	29 January 1988 (aged 17)		(North Korea) Sobaeksu
4	MF	Pak Chol-ryong	3 November 1988 (aged 16)		(North Korea) Kigwancha
5	DF	**Pak Nam-chol**	3 October 1988 (aged 16)		(North Korea) April 25
6	GK	Kim Hyon-chol	15 February 1989 (aged 16)		(North Korea) Kim Il-sung University
7	DF	Yun Yong-il	31 July 1988 (aged 17)		(North Korea) Wolmido
8	MF	**Ri Chol-myong**	18 February 1988 (aged 17)		(North Korea) Muyŏk
9	FW	**Choe Myong-ho**	3 July 1988 (aged 17)		(North Korea) Kyonggongop
10	FW	Ri Hung-ryong	22 September 1988 (aged 16)		(North Korea) Kim Il-sung University
11	FW	Pak Chol-min	10 December 1988 (aged 16)		(North Korea) Rimyongsu
12	MF	**Kim Kuk-jin**	5 January 1989 (aged 16)		(North Korea) Pyongyang
13	DF	**Jon Kwang-ik**	5 April 1988 (aged 17)		(North Korea) Amrokgang
14	MF	Kim Chol-ung	5 May 1988 (aged 17)		(North Korea) Kyonggongop
15	FW	Myong In-ho	15 June 1988 (aged 17)		(North Korea) Sobaeksu
16	DF	Pin Sok-chol	22 August 1988 (aged 17)		(North Korea) Kigwancha
17	DF	Mun Kyong-nam	8 April 1989 (aged 16)		(North Korea) Amrokgang
18	FW	**Jong Chol-min**	29 October 1988 (aged 16)		(North Korea) Rimyongsu
19	MF	**Kim Kyong-il**	11 December 1988 (aged 16)		(North Korea) Rimyongsu
20	GK	Pak Kyong-il	1 January 1988 (aged 17)		(North Korea) April 25

=== United States ===
Head coach: (United States) John Hackworth

No.	Pos.	Player	Date of birth (age)	Caps	Club
1	GK	Bryant Rueckner	20 January 1988 (aged 17)		(United States) PSG California
2	DF	Amaechi Igwe	20 May 1988 (aged 17)		(United States) Santa Clara Sporting
3	DF	Kevin Alston	5 May 1988 (aged 17)		(United States) Potomac Cougars
4	FW	**Jozy Altidore**	6 November 1989 (aged 15)		(United States) Boca Juniors
5	DF	Ofori Sarkodie	18 June 1988 (aged 17)		(United States) Chicago Magic
6	FW	Quavas Kirk	13 April 1988 (aged 17)		(United States) Los Angeles Galaxy
7	DF	**Omar Gonzalez**	11 October 1988 (aged 16)		(United States) Dallas Texans
8	MF	Kyle Nakazawa	16 March 1988 (aged 17)		(United States) ISC Strikers
9	FW	Preston Zimmerman	21 November 1988 (aged 16)		(United States) Crossfire Premier
10	FW	David Arvizu	19 April 1988 (aged 17)		(United States) Pateadores
11	MF	Ryan Soroka	5 March 1988 (aged 17)		(United States) FC Delco
12	MF	Gabriel Farfán	23 June 1988 (aged 17)		(United States) La Jolla Nomads
13	DF	Blake Wagner	29 January 1988 (aged 17)		(United States) HC United
14	DF	**Neven Subotić**	10 December 1988 (aged 16)		(United States) Manatee Magic
15	MF	Dan Kelly	29 March 1989 (aged 16)		(United States) Tennessee Futbol Club
16	MF	Nikolas Besagno	15 November 1988 (aged 16)		(United States) Real Salt Lake
17	MF	**Jeremy Hall**	11 September 1988 (aged 17)		(United States) HC United
18	GK	Diego Restrepo	25 February 1988 (aged 17)		(United States) West Kendall SC
19	MF	Michael Farfan	23 June 1988 (aged 17)		(United States) La Jolla Nomads
20	GK	Brian Perk	21 July 1989 (aged 16)		(United States) Pateadores

== Group D ==
=== Netherlands ===
Head coach: (Netherlands) Ruud Kaiser

No.	Pos.	Player	Date of birth (age)	Caps	Club
1	GK	**Tim Krul**	3 April 1988 (aged 17)		(England) Newcastle United
2	DF	Tom Hiariej	25 July 1988 (aged 17)		(Netherlands) Groningen
3	DF	**Dirk Marcellis**	23 April 1988 (aged 17)		(Netherlands) PSV
4	DF	Jordy Buijs	28 December 1988 (aged 16)		(Netherlands) Feyenoord
5	DF	Martijn van der Laan	29 July 1988 (aged 17)		(Netherlands) Groningen
6	MF	**Ruud Vormer**	11 May 1988 (aged 17)		(Netherlands) AZ
7	FW	Melvin Zaalman	17 June 1988 (aged 17)		(Netherlands) Sparta Rotterdam
8	MF	Jeffrey Sarpong	3 August 1988 (aged 17)		(Netherlands) Ajax
9	FW	Diego Biseswar	8 March 1988 (aged 17)		(Netherlands) Feyenoord
10	MF	**Vurnon Anita**	4 April 1989 (aged 16)		(Netherlands) Ajax
11	FW	John Goossens	25 July 1988 (aged 17)		(Netherlands) Ajax
12	MF	Niels Vorthoren	21 February 1988 (aged 17)		(Netherlands) Willem II
13	GK	Koen Verhoeff	6 March 1988 (aged 17)		(Netherlands) Ajax
14	DF	Mike van der Kooij	30 January 1989 (aged 16)		(Netherlands) Utrecht
15	DF	**Erik Pieters**	7 August 1988 (aged 17)		(Netherlands) Utrecht
16	GK	Nicholas Skverer	14 January 1988 (aged 17)		(Netherlands) NEC
17	FW	Marvin Emnes	27 May 1988 (aged 17)		(Netherlands) Sparta Rotterdam
18	MF	Geert Arend Roorda	2 March 1988 (aged 17)		(Netherlands) Heerenveen
19	FW	Mitchell Schet	28 January 1988 (aged 17)		(Netherlands) Feyenoord
20	MF	Jan-Arie van der Heijden	3 March 1988 (aged 17)		(Netherlands) Ajax

=== Qatar ===
Head coach: (Netherlands) Tini Ruijs

No.	Pos.	Player	Date of birth (age)	Caps	Club
1	GK	Ghaith Jumaa	2 November 1988 (aged 16)		(Qatar) Al-Khor
2	DF	Marzouq Al Qutatti	22 May 1988 (aged 17)		(Qatar) Al-Gharrafa
3	DF	Ali Solaiman	9 February 1988 (aged 17)		(Qatar) Al-Ahli
4	DF	Ahmed Al Emais	6 July 1988 (aged 17)		(Qatar) Al-Ahli
5	DF	Johar Al Kaabi	9 June 1988 (aged 17)		(Qatar) Al-Arabi
6	MF	**Abdulaziz Al Sulaiti**	11 June 1988 (aged 17)		(Qatar) Al-Arabi
7	MF	H Al khelaifi	16 June 1988 (aged 17)		(Qatar) Al-Wakra
8	MF	Abdulla Al Kuwari	16 April 1988 (aged 17)		Qatar Sports
9	FW	Ali Yahya	20 January 1988 (aged 17)		(Qatar) Al-Sadd
10	MF	**Mohammed Al Yazeedi**	30 October 1988 (aged 16)		(Qatar) Al-Sadd
11	MF	Khalid Al Abdulla	7 January 1988 (aged 17)		(Qatar) Al-Arabi
12	GK	Amro Shana	28 March 1988 (aged 17)		(Qatar) Al-Arabi
13	DF	Abdulla Al Eidh	22 March 1988 (aged 17)		(Qatar) Al-Rayyan
14	MF	**Khalfan Ibrahim**	18 February 1988 (aged 17)		(Qatar) Al-Sadd
15	FW	**Yusef Ahmed**	14 October 1988 (aged 16)		(Qatar) Al-Sadd
16	MF	Hamood Al Yazidi	28 May 1988 (aged 17)		(Qatar) Al-Sadd
17	DF	Khalid Al Sulaiti	26 April 1988 (aged 17)		(Qatar) Al-Arabi
18	FW	Abdulaziz Al Kuwari	17 May 1988 (aged 17)		Qatar Sports
19	FW	**Jaralla Al Marri**	3 April 1988 (aged 17)		(Qatar) Al-Rayyan
20	GK	Jabor Essa	5 July 1988 (aged 17)		(Qatar) Al-Sadd

=== Brazil ===
Head coach: (Brazil) Nelson Rodrigues

No.	Pos.	Player	Date of birth (age)	Caps	Club
1	GK	Felipe	10 January 1988 (aged 17)		(Brazil) Santos
2	DF	Leyrielton	22 June 1988 (aged 17)		(Brazil) Goiás
3	DF	Sidnei	23 August 1989 (aged 16)		(Brazil) Internacional
4	DF	Samuel	7 March 1988 (aged 17)		(Brazil) Atlético Mineiro
5	MF	Roberto	24 April 1988 (aged 17)		(Brazil) Guarani
6	DF	**Marcelo**	12 May 1988 (aged 17)		(Brazil) Fluminense
7	MF	Denílson	16 February 1988 (aged 17)		(Brazil) São Paulo
8	MF	**Anderson**	13 April 1988 (aged 17)		(Brazil) Grêmio
9	FW	Igor	14 June 1988 (aged 17)		(Brazil) Corinthians
10	MF	Ramón	24 May 1988 (aged 17)		(Brazil) Atlético Mineiro
11	FW	Bruno Mezenga	8 August 1988 (aged 17)		(Brazil) Flamengo
12	GK	Luiz Carlos	24 May 1988 (aged 17)		(Brazil) Internacional
13	DF	Vinícius	7 January 1988 (aged 17)		(Brazil) Palmeiras
14	DF	Simões	4 July 1988 (aged 17)		(Brazil) Botafogo
15	GK	João	6 April 1988 (aged 17)		(Brazil) Atlético Paranaense
16	MF	Maurício	21 October 1988 (aged 16)		(Brazil) Corinthians
17	MF	Tácio	21 January 1988 (aged 17)		(Brazil) Vitória
18	MF	**Renato Augusto**	8 February 1988 (aged 17)		(Brazil) Flamengo
19	MF	Celso	18 October 1988 (aged 16)		(Brazil) Portuguesa
20	FW	Cláudio	4 March 1988 (aged 17)		(Brazil) Palmeiras

=== Gambia ===
Head coach: (Ghana) Fred Osam-Duodu

No.	Pos.	Player	Date of birth (age)	Caps	Club
1	GK	Abdoulie Njie	1 March 1988 (aged 17)		(The Gambia) Steve Biko
2	DF	Piérre Gomez	3 May 1989 (aged 16)		(The Gambia) Banjul Hawks
3	DF	Ousman Sonko	2 October 1988 (aged 16)		(The Gambia) Gambia Ports Authority
4	DF	Alagie Ngum	18 October 1988 (aged 16)		(The Gambia) GAMTEL
5	DF	Lamin Conteh	22 August 1989 (aged 16)		(The Gambia) Africell
6	DF	Mandou Bojang	18 November 1988 (aged 16)		(The Gambia) Gambia Ports Authority
7	FW	Edi Faye	14 July 1989 (aged 16)		(The Gambia) Africell
8	DF	George Cole	11 August 1989 (aged 16)		(The Gambia) Wallidan
9	FW	**Momodou Ceesay**	24 December 1988 (aged 16)		(The Gambia) Wallidan
10	MF	Omar Mbye	28 December 1989 (aged 15)		(The Gambia) GAMTEL
11	DF	**Ebrima Sohna**	14 December 1988 (aged 16)		(The Gambia) Wallidan
12	MF	**Kenny Mansally**	27 January 1989 (aged 16)		(The Gambia) Real Banjul
13	FW	**Pa Modou Jagne**	26 December 1989 (aged 15)		(The Gambia) Gambia Ports Authority
14	MF	**Sainey Nyassi**	31 January 1989 (aged 16)		(The Gambia) Gambia Ports Authority
15	MF	**Tijan Jaiteh**	31 December 1988 (aged 16)		(The Gambia) Gambia Ports Authority
16	GK	Babucarr Suso	11 September 1989 (aged 16)		(The Gambia) Africell
17	MF	**Sanna Nyassi**	31 January 1989 (aged 16)		(The Gambia) Gambia Ports Authority
18	DF	Sajar Leigh	24 November 1988 (aged 16)		(The Gambia) Africell
19	GK	Christopher Allen	19 December 1989 (aged 15)		(The Gambia) GAMTEL
20	MF	**Ousman Jallow**	21 October 1988 (aged 16)		(The Gambia) Wallidan
