= List of Dutch football transfers winter 2009–10 =

This is a list of transfers in Dutch football for the 2010 Winter transfer window. Only moves featuring an Eredivisie side and/or an Eerste Divisie side are listed.

The winter transfer window will open on January 1, 2009, and will close on February 2. Deals may be signed at any given moment in the season, but the actual transfer may only take place during the transfer window. Unattached players may sign at any moment.

HFC Haarlem was declared bankrupt on 25 January 2010, so all the players can move freely, outside of the transfer period, to another club.

== Eredivisie ==
=== ADO Den Haag ===
In: Note: Flags indicate national team as defined under FIFA eligibility rules; some limited exceptions apply. Players may hold more than one non-FIFA nationality.

No.	Pos.	Nation	Player
14	MF	NED	Kees Luijckx (On loan from AZ).
19	FW	EST	Andres Oper (From (China) Shanghai Shenhua).

Out: Note: Flags indicate national team as defined under FIFA eligibility rules; some limited exceptions apply. Players may hold more than one non-FIFA nationality.

No.	Pos.	Nation	Player

=== AFC Ajax ===
In: Note: Flags indicate national team as defined under FIFA eligibility rules; some limited exceptions apply. Players may hold more than one non-FIFA nationality.

No.	Pos.	Nation	Player
39	MF	KOR	Suk Hyun-Jun (From (South Korea) Singal High School)
45	MF	URU	Nicolás Lodeiro (From (Uruguay) Nacional)
--	MF	TUR	Tayfun Candan (loan return from HFC Haarlem)
--	MF	NED	Tom Overtoom (loan return from HFC Haarlem)
--	FW	ARM	Edgar Manucharyan (loan return from HFC Haarlem)

Out: Note: Flags indicate national team as defined under FIFA eligibility rules; some limited exceptions apply. Players may hold more than one non-FIFA nationality.

No.	Pos.	Nation	Player
15	DF	URU	Bruno Silva (On loan to (Brazil) Internacional)
20	FW	ARG	Darío Cvitanich (On loan to (Mexico) Pachuca)
26	MF	NED	Jeffrey Sarpong (On loan to NEC)
27	DF	NED	Daley Blind (On loan to FC Groningen)
29	MF	NED	Mitchell Donald (On loan to Willem II)
--	FW	ARM	Edgar Manucharyan (On loan to AGOVV)

=== AZ ===
In: Note: Flags indicate national team as defined under FIFA eligibility rules; some limited exceptions apply. Players may hold more than one non-FIFA nationality.

No.	Pos.	Nation	Player
26	MF	PAR	Celso Ortiz (from (Paraguay) Cerro Porteño)
--	DF	FIN	Joona Toivio (loan return from Telstar)

Out: Note: Flags indicate national team as defined under FIFA eligibility rules; some limited exceptions apply. Players may hold more than one non-FIFA nationality.

No.	Pos.	Nation	Player
5	DF	BEL	Sébastien Pocognoli (to (Belgium) Standard Liège)
9	FW	BRA	Ari (to (Russia) Spartak Moscow)
19	MF	NED	Kees Luijckx (On loan to ADO Den Haag)
--	DF	NED	Milano Koenders (On loan to Sparta)
--	MF	NED	Chevello de Rijp (on loan to FC Groningen)
--	DF	FIN	Joona Toivio (to (Sweden) Djurgårdens IF)

=== Feyenoord ===
In: Note: Flags indicate national team as defined under FIFA eligibility rules; some limited exceptions apply. Players may hold more than one non-FIFA nationality.

No.	Pos.	Nation	Player
24	FW	NED	Mitchell Schet (loan return from Excelsior)

Out: Note: Flags indicate national team as defined under FIFA eligibility rules; some limited exceptions apply. Players may hold more than one non-FIFA nationality.

No.	Pos.	Nation	Player
2	DF	SRB	Aleksandar Ignjatović (loan return to (Serbia) FK Borac Čačak)
22	FW	NED	Andwélé Slory (to (England) West Bromwich Albion)
--	MF	BRA	Manteiga (on loan to (Brazil) Ponte Preta)
--	FW	NED	Luís Pedro (on loan to Excelsior)
--	DF	NED	Miquel Nelom (on loan to Excelsior)
--	MF	NED	Jerson Anes Ribeiro (on loan to Excelsior)

=== FC Groningen ===
In: Note: Flags indicate national team as defined under FIFA eligibility rules; some limited exceptions apply. Players may hold more than one non-FIFA nationality.

No.	Pos.	Nation	Player
8	MF	FIN	Tim Sparv (from (Finland) Halmstad)
17	DF	NED	Theo Lucius (from FC Den Bosch)
18	DF	NED	Daley Blind (on loan from AFC Ajax)
--	MF	NED	Chevello de Rijp (on loan from AZ)
--	MF	NED	Tim Keurntjes (from De Graafschap)

Out: Note: Flags indicate national team as defined under FIFA eligibility rules; some limited exceptions apply. Players may hold more than one non-FIFA nationality.

No.	Pos.	Nation	Player
4	DF	NED	Michael Jansen (on loan to Go Ahead Eagles)
8	MF	ESP	Gonzalo García (on loan to VVV)
--	GK	NED	Leon ter Wielen (to Veendam)

=== SC Heerenveen ===
In: Note: Flags indicate national team as defined under FIFA eligibility rules; some limited exceptions apply. Players may hold more than one non-FIFA nationality.

No.	Pos.	Nation	Player
14	FW	SRB	Filip Đuričić (from (Serbia) Red Star)
18	MF	SWE	Philip Haglund (from (Sweden) IF Brommapojkarna)
26	GK	IRI	Agil Etemadi (loan return from FC Emmen)
--	FW	BRA	Pedro Beda (loan return from FC Emmen)

Out: Note: Flags indicate national team as defined under FIFA eligibility rules; some limited exceptions apply. Players may hold more than one non-FIFA nationality.

No.	Pos.	Nation	Player
2	DF	CZE	Milan Kopic (on loan to (Czech Republic) Slavia Prague)
13	FW	NOR	Tarik Elyounoussi (on loan to (Norway) Lillestrøm)
14	FW	SWE	Patrik Ingelsten (to (Norway) Viking FK)

=== Heracles ===
In: Note: Flags indicate national team as defined under FIFA eligibility rules; some limited exceptions apply. Players may hold more than one non-FIFA nationality.

No.	Pos.	Nation	Player

Out: Note: Flags indicate national team as defined under FIFA eligibility rules; some limited exceptions apply. Players may hold more than one non-FIFA nationality.

No.	Pos.	Nation	Player

=== NAC ===
In: Note: Flags indicate national team as defined under FIFA eligibility rules; some limited exceptions apply. Players may hold more than one non-FIFA nationality.

No.	Pos.	Nation	Player

Out: Note: Flags indicate national team as defined under FIFA eligibility rules; some limited exceptions apply. Players may hold more than one non-FIFA nationality.

No.	Pos.	Nation	Player

=== NEC ===
In: Note: Flags indicate national team as defined under FIFA eligibility rules; some limited exceptions apply. Players may hold more than one non-FIFA nationality.

No.	Pos.	Nation	Player
9	MF	NED	Jeffrey Sarpong (on loan from Ajax)
22	DF	NED	Jeroen Heubach (on loan from FC Twente)
--	FW	COD	Joël Tshibamba (loan return from FC Oss)

Out: Note: Flags indicate national team as defined under FIFA eligibility rules; some limited exceptions apply. Players may hold more than one non-FIFA nationality.

No.	Pos.	Nation	Player
5	DF	MAR	Youssef El Akchaoui (on loan to (Germany) FC Augsburg)
--	FW	COD	Joël Tshibamba (to (Poland) Arka Gdynia)

=== PSV ===
In: Note: Flags indicate national team as defined under FIFA eligibility rules; some limited exceptions apply. Players may hold more than one non-FIFA nationality.

No.	Pos.	Nation	Player
--	FW	NED	Andy van der Meyde (free agent)
--	DF	NED	Steve Olfers (free agent)
--	MF	AUT	Marcel Ritzmaier (from Austria Kärnten)

Out: Note: Flags indicate national team as defined under FIFA eligibility rules; some limited exceptions apply. Players may hold more than one non-FIFA nationality.

No.	Pos.	Nation	Player
9	FW	SRB	Danko Lazovic (to (Russia) Zenit St. Petersburg)
17	FW	NED	Stefan Nijland (on loan to Willem II)
18	FW	PER	Reimond Manco (on loan to (Peru) Juan Aurich)
39	FW	NED	Nigel Hasselbaink (on loan to Go Ahead Eagles)
42	FW	BRA	Jonathan Reis (released)

=== RKC Waalwijk ===
In: Note: Flags indicate national team as defined under FIFA eligibility rules; some limited exceptions apply. Players may hold more than one non-FIFA nationality.

No.	Pos.	Nation	Player

Out: Note: Flags indicate national team as defined under FIFA eligibility rules; some limited exceptions apply. Players may hold more than one non-FIFA nationality.

No.	Pos.	Nation	Player
14	FW	NED	Fred Benson (on loan to (China) Shandong Luneng)
--	MF	ANT	Anton Jongsma (released)

=== Roda JC ===
In: Note: Flags indicate national team as defined under FIFA eligibility rules; some limited exceptions apply. Players may hold more than one non-FIFA nationality.

No.	Pos.	Nation	Player
7	MF	DEN	Sebastian Svärd (free agent)
15	DF	NED	Arnold Kruiswijk (on loan from (Belgium) Anderlecht)

Out: Note: Flags indicate national team as defined under FIFA eligibility rules; some limited exceptions apply. Players may hold more than one non-FIFA nationality.

No.	Pos.	Nation	Player
7	MF	NED	Edwin Linssen (on loan to Fortuna Sittard)
24	FW	NED	Harrie Gommans (on loan to Fortuna Sittard)
--	FW	NED	Kevin Vijgen (to FC Oss)

=== Sparta ===
In: Note: Flags indicate national team as defined under FIFA eligibility rules; some limited exceptions apply. Players may hold more than one non-FIFA nationality.

No.	Pos.	Nation	Player
19	DF	NED	Milano Koenders (on loan from AZ)

Out: Note: Flags indicate national team as defined under FIFA eligibility rules; some limited exceptions apply. Players may hold more than one non-FIFA nationality.

No.	Pos.	Nation	Player
13	DF	NED	Tim Bakens (released)
--	FW	NED	Romano Denneboom (loan return to FC Twente)
--	FW	NED	Melvin Zaalman (on loan to FC Dordrecht)

=== FC Twente ===
In: Note: Flags indicate national team as defined under FIFA eligibility rules; some limited exceptions apply. Players may hold more than one non-FIFA nationality.

No.	Pos.	Nation	Player
7	FW	AZE	Vagif Javadov (from (Azerbaijan) FK Qarabağ)
26	DF	NED	Dwight Tiendalli (free agent)
--	FW	NED	Romano Denneboom (loan return from Sparta)

Out: Note: Flags indicate national team as defined under FIFA eligibility rules; some limited exceptions apply. Players may hold more than one non-FIFA nationality.

No.	Pos.	Nation	Player
11	FW	AUS	Nikita Rukavytsya (to (Belgium) K.S.V. Roeselare)
12	DF	NED	Jeroen Heubach (on loan to NEC)
--	FW	NED	Lesley Nahrwold (on loan to RBC Roosendaal)
--	MF	FIN	Perparim Hetemaj (to (Italy) Brescia)

=== FC Utrecht ===
In: Note: Flags indicate national team as defined under FIFA eligibility rules; some limited exceptions apply. Players may hold more than one non-FIFA nationality.

No.	Pos.	Nation	Player
28	GK	NED	André Krul (loan return from Telstar)
--	MF	BIH	Marko Maletic (from De Graafschap)

Out: Note: Flags indicate national team as defined under FIFA eligibility rules; some limited exceptions apply. Players may hold more than one non-FIFA nationality.

No.	Pos.	Nation	Player
13	DF	NED	Mike van der Kooy (on loan to Oss)

=== Vitesse ===
In: Note: Flags indicate national team as defined under FIFA eligibility rules; some limited exceptions apply. Players may hold more than one non-FIFA nationality.

No.	Pos.	Nation	Player
15	MF	NED	Serginho Greene (free agent)

Out: Note: Flags indicate national team as defined under FIFA eligibility rules; some limited exceptions apply. Players may hold more than one non-FIFA nationality.

No.	Pos.	Nation	Player
6	DF	NED	Frank van der Struijk (on loan to Willem II)
14	MF	NED	Julian Jenner (on loan to (Germany) Rot-Weiss Ahlen)
17	FW	NED	Genaro Snijders (on loan to FC Omniworld)
19	MF	NED	Anduele Pryor (on loan to (Belgium) K.S.V. Roeselare)
23	DF	NED	Jop van der Linden (on loan to AGOVV)

=== VVV ===
In: Note: Flags indicate national team as defined under FIFA eligibility rules; some limited exceptions apply. Players may hold more than one non-FIFA nationality.

No.	Pos.	Nation	Player
10	MF	ESP	Gonzalo García (on loan from FC Groningen)
14	FW	NGR	Michael Uchebo (from (Nigeria) Enugu Rangers)
19	DF	NGR	Alex Nkume (from (Nigeria) Enugu Rangers)
25	MF	NED	Jasar Takak (free agent)
28	DF	JPN	Maya Yoshida (from (Japan) Nagoya Grampus)
30	GK	BEL	Ruud Boffin (on loan from MVV)

Out: Note: Flags indicate national team as defined under FIFA eligibility rules; some limited exceptions apply. Players may hold more than one non-FIFA nationality.

No.	Pos.	Nation	Player
10	MF	JPN	Keisuke Honda (to (Russia) CSKA Moscow)
23	MF	NED	Rick Verbeek (on loan to Helmond Sport)

=== Willem II ===
In: Note: Flags indicate national team as defined under FIFA eligibility rules; some limited exceptions apply. Players may hold more than one non-FIFA nationality.

No.	Pos.	Nation	Player
23	MF	NED	Mitchell Donald (on loan from Ajax)
29	FW	NED	Stefan Nijland (on loan from PSV)
31	DF	NED	Frank van der Struijk (on loan from Vitesse Arnhem)

Out: Note: Flags indicate national team as defined under FIFA eligibility rules; some limited exceptions apply. Players may hold more than one non-FIFA nationality.

No.	Pos.	Nation	Player
5	DF	BRA	Léo Veloso (to (Romania) CFR Cluj)
11	FW	SWE	George Mourad (released)

== Eerste Divisie ==
=== AGOVV ===
In: Note: Flags indicate national team as defined under FIFA eligibility rules; some limited exceptions apply. Players may hold more than one non-FIFA nationality.

No.	Pos.	Nation	Player
15	MF	NED	Olaf Lindenbergh (free agent)
16	DF	NED	Jop van der Linden (on loan from Vitesse Arnhem)
18	MF	NED	René van Dieren (free agent)
22	FW	ARM	Edgar Manucharyan (on loan from Ajax)
26	MF	NED	Remon de Vries (free agent)
--	DF	NED	René Bot (from (Scotland) Aberdeen)

Out: Note: Flags indicate national team as defined under FIFA eligibility rules; some limited exceptions apply. Players may hold more than one non-FIFA nationality.

No.	Pos.	Nation	Player
15	MF	BEL	Christian Kabeya (released)
—	MF	NED	Nyron Wau (to (Slovakia) DAC Dunajská Streda)

=== SC Cambuur ===
In: Note: Flags indicate national team as defined under FIFA eligibility rules; some limited exceptions apply. Players may hold more than one non-FIFA nationality.

No.	Pos.	Nation	Player
9	FW	IRI	Reza Ghoochannejhad (from Go Ahead Eagles)
23	DF	NED	Jos van Nieuwstadt (free agent)
30	DF	NED	Geoffrey Meye (from HFC Haarlem)

Out: Note: Flags indicate national team as defined under FIFA eligibility rules; some limited exceptions apply. Players may hold more than one non-FIFA nationality.

No.	Pos.	Nation	Player
9	FW	NED	Ruud ter Heide (on loan to FC Emmen)
15	FW	NED	Rence van der Wal (on loan to FC Oss)
29	DF	NED	Chris de Wagt (on loan to FC Oss)
30	DF	NED	Sander Fischer (on loan to FC Emmen)

=== FC Den Bosch ===
In: Note: Flags indicate national team as defined under FIFA eligibility rules; some limited exceptions apply. Players may hold more than one non-FIFA nationality.

No.	Pos.	Nation	Player
8	MF	NED	Wilmer Kousemaker (from HFC Haarlem)

Out: Note: Flags indicate national team as defined under FIFA eligibility rules; some limited exceptions apply. Players may hold more than one non-FIFA nationality.

No.	Pos.	Nation	Player
3	MF	FRA	Yoann de Boer (to Fortuna Sittard)
8	MF	NED	Adnan Barakat (to (Azerbaijan) FK Baku)
22	GK	NED	Bart Tinus (to JVC)

=== FC Dordrecht ===
In: Note: Flags indicate national team as defined under FIFA eligibility rules; some limited exceptions apply. Players may hold more than one non-FIFA nationality.

No.	Pos.	Nation	Player
—	DF	NED	Iderlindo Moreno Freire (from (Portugal) FC Penafiel)
—	FW	NED	Eddy Putter (free agent)
—	FW	NED	Melvin Zaalman (on loan from Sparta)
—	FW	NED	Roel de Graaff (from HFC Haarlem)

Out: Note: Flags indicate national team as defined under FIFA eligibility rules; some limited exceptions apply. Players may hold more than one non-FIFA nationality.

No.	Pos.	Nation	Player
—	FW	NED	Johan Plat (to FC Oss)

=== FC Eindhoven ===
In: Note: Flags indicate national team as defined under FIFA eligibility rules; some limited exceptions apply. Players may hold more than one non-FIFA nationality.

No.	Pos.	Nation	Player
—	GK	SVK	Maros Ferenc (free agent)
—	DF	NED	Robin Faber (free agent)
—	FW	BEL	Bart van den Eede (on loan from (Belgium) FCV Dender)
—	FW	NED	Jeffrey Vlug (free agent)

Out: Note: Flags indicate national team as defined under FIFA eligibility rules; some limited exceptions apply. Players may hold more than one non-FIFA nationality.

No.	Pos.	Nation	Player
—	FW	BEL	Wout Meeuwssen (to (Belgium) De Kempen)

=== FC Emmen ===
In: Note: Flags indicate national team as defined under FIFA eligibility rules; some limited exceptions apply. Players may hold more than one non-FIFA nationality.

No.	Pos.	Nation	Player
9	FW	NED	Ruud ter Heide (on loan from SC Cambuur)
21	MF	BRA	Leonardo II (free agent)
22	GK	NED	Bas van Wegen (from HFC Haarlem)
25	MF	NED	Patrick Lip (free agent)
26	DF	NED	Sander Fischer (on loan from SC Cambuur)
27	DF	BFA	Rahim Ouédraogo (free agent)
28	MF	NED	Erwin Buurmeijer (on loan from Veendam)

Out: Note: Flags indicate national team as defined under FIFA eligibility rules; some limited exceptions apply. Players may hold more than one non-FIFA nationality.

No.	Pos.	Nation	Player
--	GK	IRI	Agil Etemadi (loan return to SC Heerenveen)
--	FW	BRA	Pedro Beda (loan return to SC Heerenveen)

=== Excelsior ===
In: Note: Flags indicate national team as defined under FIFA eligibility rules; some limited exceptions apply. Players may hold more than one non-FIFA nationality.

No.	Pos.	Nation	Player
—	MF	NED	Luís Pedro (on loan from Feyenoord)
—	DF	NED	Miquel Nelom (on loan from Feyenoord)
—	MF	NED	Jerson Anes Ribeiro (on loan from Feyenoord)

Out: Note: Flags indicate national team as defined under FIFA eligibility rules; some limited exceptions apply. Players may hold more than one non-FIFA nationality.

No.	Pos.	Nation	Player
—	FW	NED	Mitchell Schet (loan return to Feyenoord)

=== Fortuna Sittard ===
In: Note: Flags indicate national team as defined under FIFA eligibility rules; some limited exceptions apply. Players may hold more than one non-FIFA nationality.

No.	Pos.	Nation	Player
—	MF	FRA	Yoann de Boer (from FC Den Bosch)
—	MF	NED	Edwin Linssen (on loan from Roda JC)
—	FW	NED	Harrie Gommans (on loan from Roda JC)

Out: Note: Flags indicate national team as defined under FIFA eligibility rules; some limited exceptions apply. Players may hold more than one non-FIFA nationality.

No.	Pos.	Nation	Player
—	DF	BEL	Abdul Öcal (to (Turkey) Hacettepespor)
—	MF	TUR	Taner Taktak (to (Turkey) Hacettepespor)

=== Go Ahead Eagles ===
In: Note: Flags indicate national team as defined under FIFA eligibility rules; some limited exceptions apply. Players may hold more than one non-FIFA nationality.

No.	Pos.	Nation	Player
—	DF	NED	Michael Jansen (on loan from FC Groningen)
—	FW	NED	Nigel Hasselbaink (on loan from PSV)
—	FW	NED	Donny de Groot (from (Australia) Newcastle Jets)

Out: Note: Flags indicate national team as defined under FIFA eligibility rules; some limited exceptions apply. Players may hold more than one non-FIFA nationality.

No.	Pos.	Nation	Player

=== De Graafschap ===
In: Note: Flags indicate national team as defined under FIFA eligibility rules; some limited exceptions apply. Players may hold more than one non-FIFA nationality.

No.	Pos.	Nation	Player
31	MF	BEL	Geoffrey Hairemans (from (Belgium) FC Antwerp)
32	MF	FIN	Jussi Kujala (from (Finland) TPS)
35	DF	BEL	Dimitri Hairemans (from (Belgium) FC Antwerp)

Out: Note: Flags indicate national team as defined under FIFA eligibility rules; some limited exceptions apply. Players may hold more than one non-FIFA nationality.

No.	Pos.	Nation	Player
4	DF	NED	Joost Volmer (retired)
30	MF	NED	Tim Keurntjes (to FC Groningen)
--	MF	BIH	Marko Maletic (to FC Utrecht)

=== HFC Haarlem ===
In: Note: Flags indicate national team as defined under FIFA eligibility rules; some limited exceptions apply. Players may hold more than one non-FIFA nationality.

No.	Pos.	Nation	Player

Out: Note: Flags indicate national team as defined under FIFA eligibility rules; some limited exceptions apply. Players may hold more than one non-FIFA nationality.

No.	Pos.	Nation	Player
—			All players (released)
—	GK	NED	Marco van Duin (to FC Volendam)
—	GK	NED	Bas van Wegen (to FC Emmen)
—	DF	NED	Calvin MacIntosh (to Telstar)
—	MF	NED	Benjamin van den Broek (to (England) Shrewsbury Town)
—	FW	IDN	Irfan Bachdim (to (Indonesia) Persija Jakarta)
—	FW	NED	Jeffrey van den Berg (to FC Zwolle)
—	FW	NED	Roel de Graaff (to FC Dordrecht)

=== Helmond Sport ===
In: Note: Flags indicate national team as defined under FIFA eligibility rules; some limited exceptions apply. Players may hold more than one non-FIFA nationality.

No.	Pos.	Nation	Player
15	FW	NED	Rick Verbeek (on loan from VVV)
16	FW	NED	Vincent Weijl (on loan from (England) Liverpool)
25	DF	NED	Jeffrey Altheer (free agent)

Out: Note: Flags indicate national team as defined under FIFA eligibility rules; some limited exceptions apply. Players may hold more than one non-FIFA nationality.

No.	Pos.	Nation	Player
—	MF	NED	Joas Siahaya (retired)

=== MVV ===
In: Note: Flags indicate national team as defined under FIFA eligibility rules; some limited exceptions apply. Players may hold more than one non-FIFA nationality.

No.	Pos.	Nation	Player
9	FW	SWE	Emra Tahirović (on loan from (Switzerland) FC Zürich)
--	MF	MAR	Ibrahim Maaroufi (from (Switzerland) Bellinzona)

Out: Note: Flags indicate national team as defined under FIFA eligibility rules; some limited exceptions apply. Players may hold more than one non-FIFA nationality.

No.	Pos.	Nation	Player
—	GK	BEL	Ruud Boffin (on loan to VVV)
—	MF	BEL	Cédric Ciza (loan return to (Belgium) Anderlecht)
—	FW	BEL	Jonah Remans (to (Belgium) Racing Mol-Wezel)

=== FC Omniworld ===
In: Note: Flags indicate national team as defined under FIFA eligibility rules; some limited exceptions apply. Players may hold more than one non-FIFA nationality.

No.	Pos.	Nation	Player
—	GK	NED	Erwin Friebel (from RBC, was already on loan)
—	DF	SVK	Tomáš Peciar (on loan from (Slovakia) AS Trenčín)
—	FW	ARG	David Depetris (on loan from (Slovakia) AS Trenčín)
—	FW	NED	Karim Fachtali (on loan from FC Oss)
—	FW	NED	Genaro Snijders (on loan from Vitesse Arnhem)

Out: Note: Flags indicate national team as defined under FIFA eligibility rules; some limited exceptions apply. Players may hold more than one non-FIFA nationality.

No.	Pos.	Nation	Player
—	MF	NED	Richard Haklander (on loan to FC Oss)

=== FC Oss ===
In: Note: Flags indicate national team as defined under FIFA eligibility rules; some limited exceptions apply. Players may hold more than one non-FIFA nationality.

No.	Pos.	Nation	Player
7	FW	NED	Rence van der Wal (on loan from SC Cambuur)
18	DF	NED	Chris de Wagt (on loan from SC Cambuur)
23	FW	NED	Johan Plat (from FC Dordrecht)
24	FW	GHA	Richmond Bossman (free agent)
26	DF	NED	Mike van der Kooy (on loan from FC Utrecht)
28	MF	NED	Richard Haklander (on loan from FC Omniworld)
29	FW	NED	Kevin Vijgen (from Roda JC)
30	FW	NED	Tim Peters (on loan from RBC)
31	FW	NED	Ugur Yildrim (free agent)

Out: Note: Flags indicate national team as defined under FIFA eligibility rules; some limited exceptions apply. Players may hold more than one non-FIFA nationality.

No.	Pos.	Nation	Player
7	FW	NED	Karim Fachtali (on loan to FC Omniworld)
--	FW	COD	Joël Tshibamba (loan return to NEC)
--	MF	NED	Patrick Lip (loan return to Veendam)

=== RBC ===
In: Note: Flags indicate national team as defined under FIFA eligibility rules; some limited exceptions apply. Players may hold more than one non-FIFA nationality.

No.	Pos.	Nation	Player
7	FW	NED	Lesley Nahrwold (on loan from FC Twente)

Out: Note: Flags indicate national team as defined under FIFA eligibility rules; some limited exceptions apply. Players may hold more than one non-FIFA nationality.

No.	Pos.	Nation	Player
11	FW	NED	Tim Peters (on loan to FC Oss)
—	MF	CZE	Filip Chlup (released)
—	FW	NED	Gregory Nelson (released)

=== Telstar ===
In: Note: Flags indicate national team as defined under FIFA eligibility rules; some limited exceptions apply. Players may hold more than one non-FIFA nationality.

No.	Pos.	Nation	Player
1	GK	NED	Harmen Kuperus (free agent)
3	DF	NED	Calvin MacIntosh (from HFC Haarlem)
19	MF	NED	Nicandro Breeveld (free agent)

Out: Note: Flags indicate national team as defined under FIFA eligibility rules; some limited exceptions apply. Players may hold more than one non-FIFA nationality.

No.	Pos.	Nation	Player
1	GK	NED	André Krul (loan return to FC Utrecht)
3	DF	FIN	Joona Toivio (loan return to AZ)

=== BV Veendam ===
In: Note: Flags indicate national team as defined under FIFA eligibility rules; some limited exceptions apply. Players may hold more than one non-FIFA nationality.

No.	Pos.	Nation	Player
27	FW	NED	Leon ter Wielen (from FC Groningen)

Out: Note: Flags indicate national team as defined under FIFA eligibility rules; some limited exceptions apply. Players may hold more than one non-FIFA nationality.

No.	Pos.	Nation	Player
18	MF	NED	Patrick Lip (released)
20	MF	NED	Erwin Buurmeijer (on loan to FC Emmen)

=== FC Volendam ===
In: Note: Flags indicate national team as defined under FIFA eligibility rules; some limited exceptions apply. Players may hold more than one non-FIFA nationality.

No.	Pos.	Nation	Player
—	GK	NED	Marco van Duin (from HFC Haarlem)
—	DF	NED	Tim Bakens (free agent)
—	MF	NED	Dominique van Dijk (free agent)

Out: Note: Flags indicate national team as defined under FIFA eligibility rules; some limited exceptions apply. Players may hold more than one non-FIFA nationality.

No.	Pos.	Nation	Player
—	DF	TUR	Hamit Yildiz (to Gençlerbirligi)

=== FC Zwolle ===
In: Note: Flags indicate national team as defined under FIFA eligibility rules; some limited exceptions apply. Players may hold more than one non-FIFA nationality.

No.	Pos.	Nation	Player
—	FW	NED	Jeffrey van den Berg (from HFC Haarlem)

Out: Note: Flags indicate national team as defined under FIFA eligibility rules; some limited exceptions apply. Players may hold more than one non-FIFA nationality.

No.	Pos.	Nation	Player
