= 2005 African U-17 Championship =

African U-17 Championship 2005

Tournament details
- Host country: Gambia
- Dates: 7–22 May
- Teams: 8 (from 1 confederation)
- Venue: 2 (in 2 host cities)

Final positions
- Champions: Gambia (1st title)
- Runners-up: Ghana
- Third place: Ivory Coast
- Fourth place: South Africa

Tournament statistics
- Matches played: 16
- Goals scored: 48 (3 per match)
- Top scorer: (Ghana) Opoku Agyemang

The 2005 African U-17 Championship was a football competition organized by the Confederation of African Football (CAF). The tournament took place in Gambia. The top three teams qualified for the 2005 FIFA U-17 World Championship.

== Qualification ==
=== Qualified teams ===
- Burkina Faso
- Gambia (host nation)
- Ghana
- Ivory Coast
- Mali
- Nigeria
- South Africa
- Zimbabwe

== Group stage ==
=== Group A ===
Pos	Team	Pld	W	D	L	GF	GA	GD	Pts	Qualification
1	Ghana	3	2	0	1	5	4	+1	6	Knockout stage
2	Gambia (H)	3	2	0	1	4	3	+1	6	Knockout stage
3	Mali	3	1	0	2	7	7	0	3	
4	Burkina Faso	3	1	0	2	3	5	−2	3	

Rules for classification: Group stage tiebreakers
(H) Hosts
7 May 2005

Gambia	1–0	Burkina Faso
Sanna Nyassi 69'

Independence Stadium, Bakau

7 May 2005

Ghana	3–2	Mali
Michael 9'; Appiah 72' (pen.); Agyemang		Diabaté 8'; Ansong 51' (o.g.)

Independence Stadium, Bakau

10 May 2005

Gambia	3–2	Mali
Jallow 50' (pen.) 64'; Ceesay 59'		M. Traoré 48'; Diabaté 65'

Independence Stadium, Bakau

10 May 2005

Burkina Faso	2–1	Ghana
Akaminko 10' (o.g.); Kiema 14'		Agyemang 80' (pen.)

Independence Stadium, Bakau

13 May 2005

Gambia	0–1	Ghana
		Agyemang 14'

Independence Stadium, Bakau

13 May 2005

Mali	3–1	Burkina Faso
Diabaté 11'; M. Traoré; Diarra 90'		A. Traoré 64'

Independence Stadium, Bakau

=== Group B ===
Pos	Team	Pld	W	D	L	GF	GA	GD	Pts	Qualification
1	South Africa	3	2	1	0	7	3	+4	7	Knockout stage
2	Ivory Coast	3	2	0	1	5	3	+2	6	Knockout stage
3	Nigeria	3	1	1	1	8	6	+2	4	
4	Zimbabwe	3	0	0	3	2	10	−8	0	

Rules for classification: Group stage tiebreakers
8 May 2005

Nigeria	2–2	South Africa
Zenke 50'; Wuya 78'		Msomi 20'; Nhlapo 43' (pen.)

Serrekunda Stadium, Serrekunda

8 May 2005

Ivory Coast	2–0	Zimbabwe
Fofana 63' 68'

Serrekunda Stadium, Serrekunda

11 May 2005

Nigeria	2–3	Ivory Coast
Wuya 4'; Zenke 84'		Fofana 7'; Kouassi 18'; Kouadio 78'

Serrekunda Stadium, Serrekunda

11 May 2005

South Africa	4–1	Zimbabwe
Nkambule 45'; Siwahla 57'; Nhlapo 65'; Msomi 82'		Mtandavari 34'

Serrekunda Stadium, Serrekunda

14 May 2005

Zimbabwe	1–4	Nigeria
Karuru 40'		Zenke 37'; Wuya 43'; Chukwudi 62' 69'

Serrekunda Stadium, Serrekunda

14 May 2005

Ivory Coast	0–1	South Africa
		Nhlapo 48'

Serrekunda Stadium, Serrekunda

== Knock-out stage ==
=== Semifinals ===
17 May 2005

Ghana	2 – 0 (a.e.t.)	Ivory Coast
Abubakar 115'; Agyemang 120'

Independence Stadium, Bakau

17 May 2005

South Africa	1 – 2	Gambia
Sibeko 18'		Sainey Nyassi 48'; Ceesay 51'

For winning their semifinals, Ghana and Gambia qualified for the 2005 FIFA U-17 World Championship with Ivory Coast and South Africa meeting in the third place playoff for the third and final place in the 2005 FIFA U-17 World Championship.

=== Third place playoff ===
21 May 2005

Ivory Coast	1 – 0	South Africa
Kouadio 87'

For winning the third place playoff, Ivory Coast qualified for the 2005 FIFA U-17 World Championship with South Africa missing out.

=== Final ===
22 May 2005

Ghana	0 – 1	Gambia
	Report	Jallow 87'

Independence Stadium, Bakau

== Winners ==
2005 CAF Under-17 Championship
(The Gambia)
Gambia
First title

== Goalscorers ==
4 goals

- (Ghana) Opoku Agyemang

3 goals

- (Ivory Coast) Ismaël Fofana
- (The Gambia) Ousman Jallow
- (Mali) Cheick Diabaté
- (Nigeria) Simon Zenke
- (Nigeria) Ibrahim Jibrin Wuya
- (South Africa) Tumelo Nhlapo

2 goals

- (Ivory Coast) Konan Serge Kouadio
- (The Gambia) Momodou Ceesay

2 goals, cont.

- (Mali) Mahamane Traoré
- (Nigeria) Samuel Chukwudi
- (South Africa) Sibusiso Msomi

1 goal

- (Burkina Faso) Marius Sibdou Kiema
- (Burkina Faso) Alain Traoré
- (Ivory Coast) Koffi Kouassi (footballer, born 1989)
- (The Gambia) Sainey Nyassi
- (The Gambia) Sanna Nyassi
- (Ghana) Awudu Abubakar
- (Ghana) George Appiah

1 goal, cont.

- (Ghana) Banahene Michael
- (Mali) Lassina Diarra
- (South Africa) Michael Nkambule
- (South Africa) Amos Sibeko
- (South Africa) Mkhanyiseli Siwahla
- (Zimbabwe) Ovidy Karuru
- (Zimbabwe) Victor Mtandavari

Own goals

- (Ghana) Jerry Akaminko (for Burkina Faso)
- (Ghana) Emmanuel Ansong (for Mali)
