= Tumelo =

Tumelo is a South African name that originated in Sotho language. The name usually means "believe" or "Faith, including "Belief" and "Trust". This name symbolizes Great optimism and positivity. People who are given the name are mostly considered very loyal and compassionate towards others, regardless of their background. Others consider them as people who are willing to risk their lives for their loved-ones making it very popular and cultural. Notable people with the name include:

- Tumelo Bodibe (born 1987), South African cricketer
- Tumelo Khutlang, South African football forward
- Tumelo Nhlapo (born 1988), South African football defender
- Tuks Senganga (born Tumelo Kepadisa in 1981), South African Motswako rapper
- Tumelo Simelane (born 1995), South African cricketer
- Tumelo Thagane (born 1984), South African triple jumper
