= Nhlapo =

Nhlapo or Nhlapho is a South African surname that may refer to:

- Sabelo Nhlapo (born 1988), South African rugby union player
- Sifiso Nhlapo, South African racing cyclist
- Siyabonga Nhlapo (born 1988), South African football midfielder
- Tumelo Nhlapo (born 1988), South African football defender
