= Miguel Cárdenas =

Miguel Cárdenas may refer to:

- Miguel Cárdenas (politician), Mexican politician
- Miguel Cárdenas (footballer), Paraguayan footballer
