= Ergün Berisha =

Turkish footballer (born 1988)

Personal information
- Full name: Ergün Berisha
- Date of birth: 26 April 1988 (age 38)
- Place of birth: Zürich, Switzerland
- Height: 1.80 m (5 ft 11 in)
- Position: Midfielder

Youth career
- 2003–2007: Grasshopper

Senior career*
Years	Team	Apps	(Gls)
2007–2009	Grasshopper II	21	(4)
2009–2013	Udinese	0	(0)
2010–2011	→ İstanbul BB (loan)	2	(0)
2013–2016	FC Wil	50	(1)

International career
2005	Turkey U17	8	(0)
2005–2006	Turkey U18	4	(0)
2005–2006	Turkey U19	2	(0)
2009	Turkey U21	2	(0)
- * Club domestic league appearances and goals

Ergün Berisha (Albanian: Ergyn Berisha; born 26 April 1988) is a retired footballer. Born in Switzerland and of Albanian origin, he represented Turkey at youth international levels.

== Career ==
Born in Zürich with Swiss nationality, Berisha started his career at Grasshopper Club Zürich and on 25 June 2009 joined Udinese. After failing to make an appearance for Udinese, he left for Turkish Süper Lig side İstanbul Büyükşehir Belediyespor on loan until the end of season on 1 February 2010.

Berisha made his club debut at Turkish Cup. His loan was extended in July 2010 but officially registered at Turkish Football Federation on 19 January 2011. He played 1 game in 2010–11 season, and also played 2 games in the reserve league.

On 4 February 2013, he signed for Swiss Challenge League team FC Wil.

== International career ==
He is former member of the Turkey national under-17 football team at 2005 FIFA U-17 World Championship and current member of the Turkey national under-21 football team. Her played his first U21 match on 18 November 2009, a 0–0 draw with Estonia U21.
