= Heriberto Beltrán =

Mexican football player (born 1988)

Personal information
- Full name: Heriberto Beltrán Meza
- Date of birth: 3 March 1988 (age 38)
- Place of birth: Ecatepec de Morelos, Mexico
- Height: 1.75 m (5 ft 9 in)
- Position: Forward

Youth career
- Pachuca

Senior career*
Years	Team	Apps	(Gls)
–2006	Pachuca	0	(0)
2007–2008	Universidad del Fútbol	28	(2)
2008	Tiburones Rojos de Coatzacoalcos	9	(0)
2009	Albinegros	5	(0)
2010	Inter de Tehuacán	15	(1)
2010–2011	Deportivo Lozaro	20	(3)
2011–2012	Titanes de Tulancingo	28	(2)
2012–2013	Murciélagos	26	(2)
2014–2015	Irapuato	4	(0)
Medal record
Representing Mexico
Men's football
FIFA U-17 World Cup
Winner	2005 Peru
- * Club domestic league appearances and goals

Heriberto Beltrán Meza (born 3 March 1988) is a Mexican former footballer who played as a forward. He was a Mexico youth International.

== Career ==
=== Club career ===
Beltrán started his career with Mexican top flight side Pachuca, where he suffered an eye injury. Before the 2007 season, Beltrán signed for Universidad del Fútbol in the Mexican third tier. In 2008, he signed for Mexican second-tier club Tiburones Rojos de Coatzacoalcos, where he made 9 league appearances and scored 0 goals. Before the 2010 season, Beltrán signed for Inter de Tehuacán in the Mexican third tier. In 2014, he signed for Mexican second-tier team Irapuato.

=== International career ===
He represented Mexico internationally at the 2005 FIFA U-17 World Championship, helping them win it for the first time .
