= Manuel Angelucci =

Italian footballer

Personal information
- Date of birth: 28 January 1988 (age 38)
- Position: Defender

Youth career
- –2007: Ternana

Senior career*
Years	Team	Apps	(Gls)
2007–2010	Ternana	1	(0)
2007–2008	→ Nocerina (loan)	18	(0)
2008–2009	→ Mezzocorona (loan)	10	(0)
2010	Monopoli	0	(0)
Total		29	(0)

International career
2003	Italy U15	4	(0)
2005	Italy U17	6	(0)
- * Club domestic league appearances and goals

Manuel Angelucci (born 28 January 1988) is a former Italian footballer.

== Biography ==
Angelucci started his career at Ternana. He had played for U17 team in 2004–05 season; both U18 team and the reserve in 2005–06 and the reserve in 2006–07. (Despite Ternana relegated from Serie B in 2006, its reserve still admitted to 2006–07 Campionato Nazionale Primavera) He was loaned to Nocerina for 2007–08 Serie D and Mezzocorona for 2008–09 Lega Pro Seconda Divisione. Angelucci played once in 2009–10 Lega Pro Prima Divisione. On 1 February 2010 he was signed by Monopoli.

Angelucci played twice in 2005 FIFA U-17 World Championship. He also played 4 times in 2005 UEFA European Under-17 Football Championship.
