= Agyemang Opoku =

Ghanaian footballer

Personal information
- Full name: Nana Opoku Agyemang-Prempeh
- Date of birth: 7 June 1989 (age 37)
- Place of birth: Sunyani, Bono, Ghana
- Height: 1.74 m (5 ft 9 in)
- Position: Attacking midfielder

Youth career
- 2004: Goldfields Soccer Academy Sunyani

Senior career*
Years	Team	Apps	(Gls)
2005–2006	Ashanti Gold	60	(31)
2007–2008	Sfaxien	19	(4)
2008–2012	Al-Sadd	20	(13)
2011	→ Al-Ahly Doha (loan)	10	(1)
2012	Levski Sofia	1	(0)
2013–2014	Hapoel Kfar Saba	9	(0)
2014–2015	PIFA Sports	0	(0)

International career
2005	Ghana U-17		
2009	Ghana U-20	5	(0)
2009–2011	Ghana	10	(0)
- * Club domestic league appearances and goals

Nana Opoku Agyemang-Prempeh (born 7 June 1989) commonly known as Agyemang Opoku, is a Ghanaian professional footballer who plays as an attacking midfielder.

== Club career ==
Born in Sunyani, Bono, Opoku began his career at the Goldfields Soccer Academy Sunyani and was promoted to Ashanti Gold S.C. He left Ashanti Gold and moved to Tunisian side Club Sportif Sfaxien as a free agent in January 2007.

In December 2008, Opoku signed with Al Sadd of the Qatar Stars League. On 22 February 2011, he joined another Qatari club Al-Ahli on a three-month loan deal from Al Sadd.

Opoku signed a contract with Bulgarian side Levski Sofia during the summer of 2012 and made his official debut for the team on 26 July 2012, in a 1–3 away loss against FK Sarajevo in a UEFA Europa League match. His first and only game in the league was on 25 August 2012, in the 2–0 away win over Montana. The contract with Levski Sofia ended on 27 October 2012 due to injuries.

== International career ==
Opoku played at the 2005 Africa under 17 Championships and was member of the Ghana national under-17 football team at 2005 FIFA U-17 World Championship in Peru. Opoku was also part of the Ghana national under-20 football team that won the 2009 FIFA U-20 World Cup in Egypt.

== Honours ==
Sfaxien

- CAF Confederations Cup: 2008

Al Sadd

- Qatari Stars Cup: 2010

Ghana U-17

- African U-17 Championship runner up: 2005

Ghana U-20

- FIFA U-20 World Cup: 2009

Ghana

- Africa Cup of Nations Silver Medal: 2010

Individual

- African U-17 Championship Top scorer: 2005
