= Fabio Franceschini =

Italian footballer

Personal information
- Date of birth: 8 May 1988 (age 38)
- Place of birth: Copparo, Italy
- Position: Defender

Youth career
- SPAL
- 2004–2008: Lecce

Senior career*
| Years | Team | Apps | (Gls) |
| 2008–2010 | Giacomense | 32 | (0) |
| Total | | 32 | (0) |

International career
| 2005 | Italy U17 | 0 | (0) |
| 2006 | Italy U19 | 2 | (0) |
- * Club domestic league appearances and goals

Fabio Franceschini (born 8 May 1988) is a former Italian footballer who played as a defender.

== Club career ==
Born in Copparo, the province of Ferrara, Emilia region, Franceschini started his career at Ferrara team SPAL. He left for U.S. Lecce in temporary deal along with Bidre'ce Azor in July 2004. In the end of season, Franceschini was signed by Lecce outright and Azor became a free agent after the bankruptcy of SPAL SpA and joined Sampdoria. Franceschini was a member of the reserve from 2005 to 2008. In 2008 Franceschini left for Giacomense. He played 32 games in the fourth division.

== International career ==
Franceschini was included in the preliminary 23-men squad for 2005 UEFA European Under-17 Football Championship, but was not included in the final 18-men squad. He also included in the 20-man squad for 2005 FIFA U-17 World Championship as an unused substitute.

Franceschini played twice for Italy national under-19 football team in October 2006.
