= Mahamane Traoré =

Malian footballer

Personal information
- Full name: Mahamane El Hadji Traoré
- Date of birth: 31 August 1988 (age 38)
- Place of birth: Bamako, Mali
- Height: 1.75 m (5 ft 9 in)
- Position: Midfielder

Youth career
- 2004–2005: Cercle Olympique

Senior career*
| Years | Team | Apps | (Gls) |
| 2004–2006 | Nice B | 30 | (4) |
| 2006–2016 | Nice | 100 | (9) |
| 2010–2012 | → Metz (loan) | 36 | (5) |
| 2017 | Žalgiris | 10 | (0) |
| Total | | 176 | (18) |

International career
- Mali U17
| 2005–2014 | Mali | 32 | (2) |
- * Club domestic league appearances and goals

Mahamane El Hadji Traoré (born 31 August 1988) is a Malian professional footballer who played as a midfielder. Internationally, he represented Mali.

== Career ==
Traoré played for Cercle Olympique de Bamako.

He earned his first cap with Mali in June 2005. At the youth level he played in the 2005 African U-17 Championship, scoring two goals.

On 17 February 2017, Traoré signed with Lithuanian club Žalgiris of the A Lyga.

== Career statistics ==
Scores and results list Mali's goal tally first, score column indicates score after each Traoré goal.

List of international goals scored by Mahamane Traoré
| No. | Date | Venue | Opponent | Score | Result | Competition |
|---|---|---|---|---|---|---|
| 1 | 5 June 2011 | Harare, Zimbabwe | Zimbabwe | | 2–1 | 2012 Africa Cup of Nations qualification |
| 2 | 3 September 2011 | Bamako, Mali | Cape Verde | | 3–0 | 2012 Africa Cup of Nations qualification |

== Honours ==
Mali

- Africa Cup of Nations bronze: 2013
