= 2005 South American U-17 Championship =

2005 South American Under 17 Football Championship
2005 Sudamericano Sub-17

Tournament details
- Host country: Venezuela
- Dates: 1–17 April
- Teams: 10 (from 1 confederation)
- Venue: 1 (in 1 host city)

Final positions
- Champions: Brazil (7th title)
- Runners-up: Uruguay
- Third place: Ecuador
- Fourth place: Colombia

Tournament statistics
- Matches played: 30
- Goals scored: 107 (3.57 per match)
- Top scorer: (Brazil) Kerlon (8 goals)

The 2005 South American Under-17 Football Championship was a football competition for U-17 national teams affiliated with CONMEBOL. It was the 11th time the tournament was held. It was played in Venezuela from 1 to 17 April 2005.

The host city of the competition was Maracaibo, which was chosen in April 2004.

== First round ==
The 10 national teams were divided in 2 groups of 5 teams each. The top 2 teams qualified for the final round.

=== Group A ===
Team	Pts	PLD	W	D	L	GF	GA
Brazil	9	4	3	0	1	18	7
Ecuador	9	4	3	0	1	12	8
Paraguay	9	4	3	0	1	12	8
Bolivia	3	4	1	0	3	8	14
Venezuela	0	4	0	0	4	5	18

`1 April 2005	Venezuela	1–3	Paraguay

1 April 2005	Bolivia	2–4	Brazil

3 April 2005	Venezuela	2–3	Bolivia

3 April 2005	Paraguay	1–3	Ecuador

5 April 2005	Paraguay	5–2	Bolivia

5 April 2005	Brazil	5–1	Ecuador

7 April 2005	Venezuela	1–7	Brazil

7 April 2005	Bolivia	1–3	Ecuador

9 April 2005	Venezuela	1–5	Ecuador

9 April 2005	Paraguay	3–2	Brazil

=== Group B ===
Team	Pts	Pld	W	D	L	GF	GA
Uruguay	9	4	3	0	1	8	1
Colombia	7	4	2	1	1	4	2
Chile	6	4	2	0	2	6	7
Argentina	4	4	1	1	2	6	7
Peru	3	4	1	0	3	5	12

2 April 2005
Colombia	0:1	Chile	Maracaibo
Uruguay	1:0	Argentina	Maracaibo
4 April 2005
Chile	3:0	Peru	Maracaibo
Colombia	1:0	Uruguay	Maracaibo
6 April 2005
Peru	1:3	Colombia	Maracaibo
Chile	2:3	Argentina	Maracaibo
8 April 2005
Argentina	0:0	Colombia	Maracaibo
Uruguay	3:0	Peru	Maracaibo
10 April 2005
Uruguay	4:0	Chile	Maracaibo
Argentina	3:4	Peru	Maracaibo

== Final round ==
The final round were played in the same system that first round, with the best 4 teams.

Equipo	Pts	Pld	W	D	L	GF	GA
Brazil	7	3	2	1	0	9	4
Uruguay	7	3	2	1	0	7	4
Ecuador	3	3	1	0	2	5	9
Colombia	0	3	0	0	3	2	6

13 April 2005
Uruguay	4:2	Ecuador	Maracaibo
Brazil	3:1	Colombia	Maracaibo
15 April 2005
Uruguay	1:0	Colombia	Maracaibo
Brazil	4:1	Ecuador	Maracaibo
17 April 2005
Ecuador	2:1	Colombia	Maracaibo
Brazil	2:2	Uruguay	Maracaibo

- Brazil and Uruguay qualify to 2005 FIFA U-17 World Cup in Peru

2005 South American Under-17 Football champions

Brazil
7th title

== Top goalscorers ==
Nation	Player	Goals
(Brazil)	Kerlon	8
(Uruguay)	Elías Figueroa	6
(Brazil)	Anderson	5
(Paraguay)	Javier Acuña	5
(Brazil)	Ramón	5
