= Chevello de Rijp =

Dutch footballer

Chevello de Rijp (born 11 December 1989 in Amsterdam, Netherlands) is a Dutch footballer who played for Eerste Divisie league club Stormvogels Telstar during the 2008–2009 season.

== Personal life ==
Born in the Netherlands, de Rijp is of Surinamese descent.
