= Simone Palermo =

Italian footballer

Personal information
- Date of birth: 17 August 1988 (age 38)
- Place of birth: Rome, Italy
- Height: 1.80 m (5 ft 11 in)
- Position: Midfielder

Team information
- Current team: Viterbese
- Number: 10

Youth career
- ?–2008: Roma
- 2007: → Rimini (loan)

Senior career*
Years	Team	Apps	(Gls)
2008–2009	Treviso	4	(0)
2009	→ Pistoiese (loan)	9	(0)
2010	Pro Patria	4	(0)
2010–2011	Foggia	13	(0)
2011–2012	Piacenza	3	(0)
2012–2013	Gubbio	24	(2)
2013–2015	Cremonese	58	(1)
2015–2018	Virtus Entella	76	(1)
2018	Ravenna	7	(0)
2018–	Viterbese	0	(0)

International career
2003	Italy U15	4	(0)
2003–2004	Italy U16	14	(0)
2004–2005	Italy U17	13	(3)
2005	Italy U18	2	(0)
2005	Italy U19	1	(1)
- * Club domestic league appearances and goals as of 12 August 2018

Simone Palermo (born 17 August 1988) is an Italian footballer who plays as a midfielder for Viterbese at Serie C.

== Biography ==
Palermo started his career at hometown club A.S. Roma, where he received Italian youth teams call-up since 2003. He signed a youth contract until June 2008 in March 2006. In July 2007 he joined Rimini on loan with option to purchase, as part of Ahmed Barusso deal to Roma. On 30 January 2008, Palermo returned to Roma. On 1 September 2008, he joined Serie B side in co-ownership deal and cost Treviso a peppercorn of €500. Palermo left for A.C. Pistoiese of Lega Pro Prima Divisione on loan in January.

In June 2009, after the bankrupt of Treviso, Palermo became a free agent and on 1 February 2010 joined Prima Divisione side Pro Patria.

In August 2010 he signed a 1+2 year contract with Foggia.

On 5 November 2011 he signed a contract with Piacenza. In 2012, he joined Gubbio.

=== Cremonese ===
Cremonese signed Palermo in co-ownership deal from Parma for €100,000 and Massimo Loviso in temporary deal on 15 July 2013. Parma acquired Palermo from Gubbio for €70,000 (including other costs).

=== International career ===
Palermo capped for Italy at 2005 UEFA European Under-17 Football Championship (5 games) and 2005 FIFA U-17 World Championship (3 games). He also played 5 friendlies for U17.
