= Ghaith Jumaa =

Qatari footballer (born 1988)

Personal information
- Full name: Ghaith Jumaa Ali Al-Muhannadi
- Date of birth: 2 November 1988 (age 37)
- Place of birth: Qatar
- Height: 1.75 m (5 ft 9 in)
- Position: Goalkeeper

Senior career*
Years	Team	Apps	(Gls)
2006–2019	Al-Khor		
2007–2008	→ Al-Rayyan (loan)		
2008–2009	→ Al-Sailiya (loan)		
2009–2012	→ Al-Ahli (loan)		
2017–2018	→ Muaither (loan)		
2019-2022	Muaither		
- * Club domestic league appearances and goals

Ghaith Jumaa (Arabic:غيث جمعة) (born 2 November 1988) is a Qatari footballer who plays in the position of goalkeeper. He most recently played for Muaither SC in 2022.
