= Tim Keurntjes =

Dutch footballer

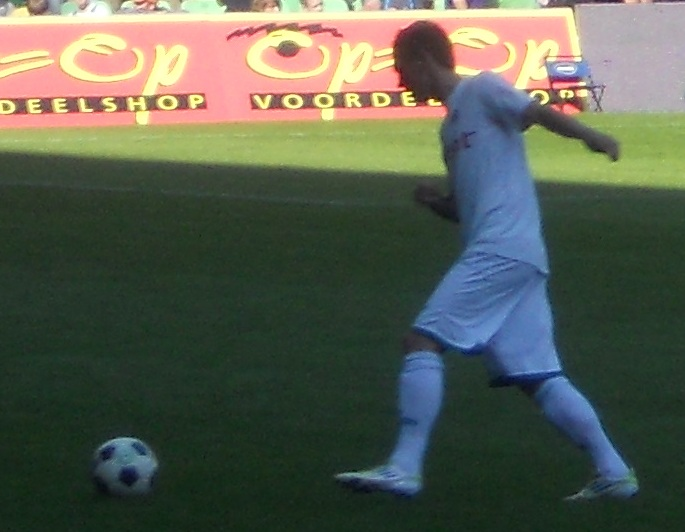
- Keurntjes with Groningen in 2011

Personal information
- Full name: Tim Keurntjes
- Date of birth: 13 March 1991 (age 35)
- Place of birth: Doetinchem, Netherlands
- Height: 1.76 m (5 ft 9 in)
- Position: Left back

Youth career
- –2001: DCS
- 2001–2010: De Graafschap

Senior career*
Years	Team	Apps	(Gls)
2009–2010	De Graafschap	3	(0)
2010–2013	Groningen	8	(0)
2012–2013	→ Cambuur (loan)	13	(0)
2013–2016	Telstar	59	(7)
2016–2018	De Graafschap	11	(0)
2019	TOP Oss	1	(0)
2019–	MASV		
- * Club domestic league appearances and goals as of 12 October 2023

Tim Keurntjes (born 13 March 1991) is a Dutch footballer who plays as a left back for MASV in the Dutch Eerste Klasse.

== Career ==
Keurntjes started his career at SV DCS and joined De Graafschap's youth academy in 2001. In the 2009–10 season, he played with Jong De Graafschap in the KNVB Cup tournament. He scored the only goal against FC Zwolle before the team went on to lose to NAC Breda. In that period he also made his professional debut in the first team of De Graafschap: a match on 20 November 2009, where he came on as a substitute for Jordy Buijs against Excelsior. He would also make appearances against HFC Haarlem and BV Veendam that season.

On 21 January 2010, Eredivisie club Groningen signed Keurntjes on a three-year contract, with him joining the club ahead of the 2010–11 season. He made his debut for the club in a pre-season friendly on 3 July 2010 against RWE Eemsmond. He came on in the second half and also scored the 0–10 for Groningen. Keurntjes made his official debut for the side on 22 September 2011 in an away match against AZ in the KNVB Cup. He scored a goal for Groningen in this match, as they lost 4–2. The club then sent Keurntjes on loan to Cambuur in the 2012–13 season. After three seasons at Telstar, Keurntjes returned to De Graafschap in 2016, with whom he promoted to the Eredivisie in 2018 via the post-season play-offs. In September 2019, he started practicing with TOP Oss, and became eligible to play for the club from January 2019. Six months later, he moved to the Arnhem based amateur club MASV.

== Honours ==
De Graafschap

- Eerste Divisie: 2009–10

Cambuur

- Eerste Divisie: 2012–13
