= Mike van der Kooy =

Dutch footballer (born 1989)

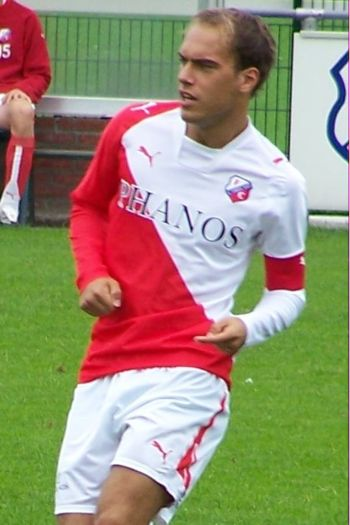

Personal information
- Date of birth: 30 January 1989 (age 37)
- Place of birth: Utrecht, Netherlands
- Position: Centre back

Youth career
- UVV
- VV De Meern
- 2001–2007: Utrecht

Senior career*
Years	Team	Apps	(Gls)
2007–2010	Utrecht	5	(0)
2009–2010	→ Oss (loan)	10	(1)
2010–2012	AGOVV	37	(1)
2012–2015	DOVO		
2015–2017	Genemuiden		
2017–2018	DHSC		

International career
2003–2004	Netherlands U15	3	(0)
2005	Netherlands U16	3	(0)
2005	Netherlands U17	7	(1)
Medal record
Representing Netherlands
FIFA U-17 World Cup
Third place	Peru 2005	U-17 Team
UEFA European Under-17 Championship
Runner-up	2005
- * Club domestic league appearances and goals

Mike van der Kooy (born 30 January 1989) is a Dutch former professional footballer who played as a defender, preferably as a centre back.

== Club career ==
Van der Kooy began his career playing for various youth teams. In 2007, he moved to FC Utrecht. He made his debut victory against Willem II Tilburg in Eredivisie on 3 February 2008, by a score of 2–0. He soon signed a professional contract until 2011 with FC Utrecht. Van der Kooy eventually played five league games for the club.

On 2 August 2010, he signed a two-year contract with AGOVV. When his contract expired in 2012, his professional career came to an end, but he continued in the lower leagues from July 2012 to July 2015 for Hoofdklasse club DOVO. From July 2015 to July 2017, Van der Kooy played for SC Genemuiden in the Hoofdklasse. From September 2017, Van der Kooy played briefly with Eerste Klasse team DHSC from his hometown, but he decided to retire after a serious knee injury.

== International career ==
Van der Kooy played for the Netherlands at under-15, under-16 and under-17 level. As part of the U17s, he participated in the 2005 FIFA U-17 World Championship in Peru, where the Netherlands finished in third place.
