= Celsinho (footballer, born August 1988) =

Brazilian footballer

Personal information
- Full name: Celso Luís Honorato Júnior
- Date of birth: 25 August 1988 (age 38)
- Place of birth: Americana, Brazil
- Height: 1.77 m (5 ft 9 1/2 in)
- Position: Attacking midfielder

Team information
- Current team: Paranoá

Youth career
- 2001–2005: Portuguesa

Senior career*
Years	Team	Apps	(Gls)
2005–2006	Portuguesa		
2006–2008	Lokomotiv Moscow	4	(1)
2007–2008	→ Sporting CP (loan)	7	(0)
2008–2012	Sporting CP	0	(0)
2008–2009	→ Estrela Amadora (loan)	12	(1)
2010	→ Portuguesa (loan)	4	(0)
2011–2012	→ Târgu Mureş (loan)	8	(1)
2013–2017	Londrina	29	(3)
2013	→ Fortaleza (loan)	1	(0)
2015	→ Figueirense (loan)	7	(0)
2016	→ Paysandu (loan)	18	(1)
2016–2017	Londrina	21	(2)
2018	São Bento	5	(0)
2019	Água Santa	0	(0)
2019	Santa Cruz	3	(0)
2020	Vila Nova	6	(0)
2020–2022	Londrina	36	(4)
2022	EC Lemense	10	(2)
2023	São Caetano	8	(0)
2024	Nova Venécia		
2024	Grêmio Maringá		
2025–	Paranoá	8	(0)

International career
2005	Brazil U17	4	(2)
- * Club domestic league appearances and goals as of 8 March 2025

Celso Luís Honorato Júnior (born 25 August 1988), known as Celsinho, is a Brazilian footballer who plays for Paranoá as an attacking midfielder.

== Club career ==
Celsinho started his professional career at Associação Portuguesa de Desportos, being promoted to the first team in 2005. He was often compared to Ronaldinho due to physical resemblance and for playing in the same position, having even been invited to portray Ronaldinho in his early days in a movie.

In January 2006, after a stellar 2005 FIFA U-17 World Championship in Peru, where he scored twice for eventual finalists Brazil, both of the goals coming in the knockout stages, Celsinho was bought by Russian club FC Lokomotiv Moscow from Associação Portuguesa de Desportos, where he failed to settle overall due to climate, the overall roughness of football and a bad personal relationship with the team's coach.

Celsinho joined Sporting Clube de Portugal in the 2007 summer, being loaned with the option for a permanent deal. At the Lisbon side, however, he also did not manage to receive significant playing time. His Primeira Liga debut came on 29 September as he featured six minutes in a 0–0 away draw against S.L. Benfica, and his output for the campaign consisted of ten official matches (including nine minutes in a 1–2 loss at A.S. Roma in the UEFA Champions League), none complete.

After being signed permanently, Celsinho moved on loan to fellow league club C.F. Estrela da Amadora to gain more first-team experience. In the season opener, at home against Académica de Coimbra, he started and scored the game's only goal, but fell out of favour shortly after, his last appearance being in late February 2009 (in November of the previous year he was subjected to disciplinary proceedings by both Sporting and Estrela, after being caught in bars in Montijo and Lisbon); Estrela was also relegated due to financial irregularities, after having finished in mid-table.

Celsinho spent one entire year at Sporting without making one single appearance, also failing medicals at several Brazilian teams in view of a transfer. In January 2010 he returned to Portuguesa on loan, being again rarely played.

In early June 2011, Celsinho was loaned again, now to FCM Târgu Mureş in Romania.

== Honours ==
Sporting

- Taça de Portugal: 2007–08

Londrina

- Campeonato Paranaense: 2014

Paysandu

- Campeonato Paraense: 2016
- Copa Verde: 2016
