= Samuel (footballer, born 1988) =

Brazilian footballer

Personal information
- Full name: Samuel Elias do Carmo Soares
- Date of birth: March 7, 1988 (age 38)
- Place of birth: Igaratinga, Brazil
- Height: 1.88 m (6 ft 2 in)
- Position: Defender

Youth career
- –2008: Atlético Mineiro

Senior career*
Years	Team	Apps	(Gls)
2008–2013	Atlético Mineiro	5	(0)
2010–2011	→ Paços de Ferreira (loan)	11	(1)
2012	→ Fortaleza (loan)	0	(0)
2012	→ Boa Esporte (loan)	0	(0)
2013	→ Villa Nova-MG (loan)		
- * Club domestic league appearances and goals as of July 6, 2012

Samuel Elias do Carmo Soares, better known as Samuel, is a defender since the basic categories of the Atlético Mineiro.

== Career ==
Up to the professional team in the 2008 season, when he made only one game. In 2009, went on to win with the odds so far, technical Emerson Leão. But in a match against Rio Branco-MG, the first phase of the Mineiro, was injured and out of plans for the entire season. Already in 2010, under the command of Vanderlei Luxemburgo, was again among the group's professional team. However, he made only two friendlies and was loaned to Paços de Ferreira of Portugal for two seasons.

He has participated in the Brazilian Football Team U-18.

=== Career statistics ===
(Correct as of October 16, 2010)

Club	Season	State League		Brazilian Série A		Copa do Brasil		Copa Sudamericana		Total	
Club	Season	Apps	Goals	Apps	Goals	Apps	Goals	Apps	Goals	Apps	Goals
Atlético Mineiro	2008	0	0	0	0	0	0	-	-	0	0
Atlético Mineiro	2009	1	0	0	0	0	0	0	0	1	0
Atlético Mineiro	2010	0	0	0	0	0	0	-	-	0	0
Total		1	0	0	0	-	-	-	-	1	0

== Contract ==
- Atlético Mineiro.
