= Bruno Simões (Brazilian footballer) =

Brazilian footballer (born 1988)

Personal information
- Full name: Bruno Simões Teixeira
- Date of birth: July 4, 1988 (age 38)
- Place of birth: Rio de Janeiro, Brazil
- Height: 1.83 m (6 ft 0 in)
- Position: Central defender

Team information
- Current team: Itaúna

Youth career
- Years: Team
- 2005–2006: Botafogo
- 2007: Cruzeiro
- 2008: Itaúna (Loan)

Bruno Simões Teixeira (born July 4, 1988), or simply Simões, is a Brazilian central defender. He currently plays for Itaúna on loan from Cruzeiro.

== Contract ==
- Itaúna (Loan) 21 January 2008 to 31 May 2008
- Cruzeiro 11 October 2006 to 30 September 2009
