= Sibusiso Msomi =

South African soccer player

Personal information
- Full name: Sibusiso Msomi
- Date of birth: 31 December 1988 (age 37)
- Place of birth: Empangeni, South Africa
- Height: 1.71 m (5 ft 7 1/2 in)
- Position: Midfielder

Team information
- Current team: Richards Bay
- Number: 15

Youth career
- Bright Stars
- Kaizer Chiefs

Senior career*
| Years | Team | Apps | (Gls) |
| 2009–2018 | Platinum Stars | 138 | (11) |
| 2019– | Richards Bay | 6 | (0) |

International career
| 2013 | South Africa | 3 | (0) |
- * Club domestic league appearances and goals as of 14:38, 5 December 2019 (UTC)

Sibusiso Msomi (born 31 December 1988) is a South African professional soccer player who plays for Richards Bay as a midfielder.

== Club career ==
Msomi began his youth career at local club Bright Stars before joining the Kaizer Chiefs academy. He failed to make a first-team appearance for Chiefs and joined Platinum Stars in July 2009.

== International career ==
Msomi was part of the South Africa squad for the 2013 COSAFA Cup and made his debut against Namibia.
