= Mkhanyiseli Siwahla =

South African soccer player

Personal information
- Full name: Mkhanyiseli Siwahla
- Date of birth: 3 September 1988 (age 38)
- Place of birth: Cape Town, South Africa
- Height: 1.65 m (5 ft 5 in)
- Position: Right winger

Team information
- Current team: Proch Pionki

Youth career
- Amabhantinti
- Ajax Cape Town

Senior career*
Years	Team	Apps	(Gls)
2004–2010	Ajax Cape Town		
2009	→ Bloemfontein Celtic (loan)	4	(0)
2010–2012	Cape Town		
2012–2013	Chippa United	13	(2)
2013	Mpumalanga Black Aces	2	(0)
2017	Proch Pionki		
2018	Partizán Bardejov	24	(0)
2019–	Proch Pionki		
- * Club domestic league appearances and goals as of 14:47, 13 June 2019 (UTC)

Mkhanyiseli Siwahla (born 3 September 1988) is a South African soccer player who plays as a midfielder for Polish club Proch Pionki.

== Career ==
Siwahla began his career with Ajax Cape Town in 2004. He became the youngest player to score a goal in South African professional football in 2004 at the age of 15 years and 174 days when he scored in an ABSA Cup game against Dynamos. In January 2009, Siwahla claimed that he was assaulted in the dressing room by some of his teammates after a draw with local rivals Santos. The club denied that he was attacked, but admitted that there was an argument about Siwahla's commitment on the field. He was later fined for absconding from training after his accusations and placed on the transfer list.

He joined Bloemfontein Celtic on a season-long loan in July 2009, but returned to Ajax in December 2009 after allegations of ill-discipline. Ajax terminated his contract in January 2010 and he joined National First Division team FC Cape Town in August 2010 on a two-year contract. Whilst at FC Cape Town, Siwahla attended trials with Turkish Süper Lig club Istanbul BB in 2011 but failed to earn a contract. Despite expressing an interest to join an overseas club at the end of his contract, he joined newly promoted PSL team Chippa United in September 2012 on a one-year deal. He left the club after their relegation at the end of the 2012–13 season.

He joined Mpumalanga Black Aces in July 2013 on a one-year contract but left Aces in October 2013 by mutual consent after he and Mark Mayambela allegedly arrived at training under the influence of alcohol. Both players were asked to undergo alcohol tests at a clinic, but they refused and were suspended pending a disciplinary hearing. The players indicated that they did not want to attend the hearing and the club agreed with their request to be released from their contracts instead.

In 2019, Siwahla returned to Proch Pionki in Poland.
