= Lassina Diarra =

Malian professional footballer

Personal information
- Date of birth: 29 December 1989 (age 36)
- Place of birth: Mali
- Position: Forward

Team information
- Current team: AS Bakaridjan

Senior career*
Years	Team	Apps	(Gls)
2013–	AS Bakaridjan	12	(1)

International career
2014–	Mali	1	(0)
- * Club domestic league appearances and goals

Lassina Diarra is a Malian professional footballer who plays as a forward for AS Bakaridjan.

== International career ==
In January 2014, coach Djibril Dramé invited him to be a part of the Mali squad for the 2014 African Nations Championship. He helped the team to the quarter-finals where they lost to Zimbabwe by two goals to one.
