= Filip Chlup =

Czech professional footballer

Personal information
- Full name: Filip Chlup
- Date of birth: 10 June 1985 (age 41)
- Place of birth: Vyškov, Czechoslovakia
- Position: Midfielder

Senior career*
| Years | Team | Apps | (Gls) |
| 2005–2008 | 1. FC Brno | 24 | (0) |
| 2008–2010 | RBC Roosendaal | 10 | (0) |
| 2010 | 1. FC Brno | 3 | (0) |
- * Club domestic league appearances and goals as of 1 December 2010

Filip Chlup (born 10 June 1985) is a Czech professional footballer who played as a midfielder for 1. FC Brno. He formerly played for RBC Roosendaal.
