= Emmanuel Ansong =

Ghanaian footballer

Personal information
- Full name: Emmanuel Ansong
- Date of birth: October 22, 1989 (age 37)
- Place of birth: Accra, Ghana
- Height: 1.68 m (5 ft 6 in)
- Position: Defender

Team information
- Current team: Hearts of Oak
- Number: 4

Youth career
- Great Olympics

Senior career*
Years	Team	Apps	(Gls)
2005	Great Olympics		
2007–2010	Heart of Lions		
2010–2012	Aduana Stars		
2012–	Hearts of Oak		

International career^{‡}
2005	Ghana U-17	3	(0)
2008–	Ghana	2	(0)
- * Club domestic league appearances and goals as of 02:51, 3 May 2013 (UTC) ‡ National team caps and goals as of May 30, 2007

Emmanuel Ansong (born October 22, 1989, in Accra) is a Ghanaian footballer who plays as a defender for Hearts of Oak.

== Career ==
Ansong began his career by Great Olympics, and later signed a contract with Heart of Lions. He was named as captain in the 2008 series.

== International ==
Ansong was member of the 2005 Africa under 17 Championships and was member of the Ghana national under-17 football team at 2005 FIFA U-17 World Championship in Peru.
