= Elías Figueroa (footballer, born 1988) =

Uruguayan footballer

Personal information
- Full name: Elías Ricardo Figueroa Silva
- Date of birth: January 26, 1988 (age 38)
- Place of birth: Paysandú, Uruguay
- Height: 1.88 m (6 ft 2 in)
- Position: Forward

Team information
- Current team: Oriental Dragon FC

Youth career
- 2004–2005: Liverpool Montevideo

Senior career*
Years	Team	Apps	(Gls)
2005–2012	Liverpool Montevideo	131	(25)
2013–2014	Huachipato	4	(0)
2014	Central Español	1	(0)
2015	Apollon Kalamarias	9	(2)
2015–2016	El Tanque Sisley	18	(1)
2017	Liverpool Montevideo	2	(0)
2019–	Oriental Dragon FC		

International career
2005	Uruguay U17	10	(8)
2007	Uruguay U20	10	(2)
- * Club domestic league appearances and goals as of 6 July 2015

Elías Ricardo Figueroa Silva (born January 26, 1988) is an Uruguayan professional footballer who plays as a forward for Oriental Dragon FC in Portugal. He was named after Chilean football legend Elías Figueroa.

== Club career ==
Figueroa was born in Paysandú. He began his career in 2005 with Liverpool de Montevideo after impressing in Uruguay's youth divisions. His outstanding performances in the Uruguay U-17 team helped him to travel to London in March 2006 to make a two-week test in Chelsea F.C., but finally he did not stay at the club. Other clubs such as Racing de Santander, Sporting Braga and Atlético Mineiro put their eyes on this young talent, but they never ended acquiring him.

In mid 2010, it was rumored that the Australian club Sydney FC was interested in signing the striker for the 2010–11 A-League season. According to Uruguayan news, he signed for Sydney FC on June 21, 2010. However, this was denied by Sydney FC, admitting they had been looking at Figueroa as a possible signing, but had not signed him.

In August 2013, he signed a new deal with Chilean side CD Huachipato after his contract came on to an end in Liverpool Montevideo.

In March 2014, he returned to Uruguayan football to play for Central Español in the Uruguayan Segunda División. During 2014 he attended a special sports clinic to stop drinking alcohol, after having several problems with it during his career.

In January 2015, Figueroa finally departed to Europe to play for Greek side Apollon Kalamarias

In 2019, Figueroia joined Oriental Dragon FC in Portugal.

== International career ==
Figueroa played for the Uruguay U-17 team at the 2005 South American Under 17 Football Championship held in Venezuela, he scored 6 goals finishing as the second leading goal scorer in the tournament. Uruguay went on to qualify for the 2005 FIFA U-17 World Cup held in Peru and Figueroa was selected for the squad to play in the tournament. Uruguay finished bottom of their group with 0 points, Elías played in all three of the matches, scoring one goal against Turkey and Australia.

Two years later, he played for the Uruguay U-20 team at the 2007 South American Youth Championship, Uruguay qualified for the 2007 FIFA U-20 World Cup. Figueroa was selected for the tournament playing alongside Luis Suárez and Edinson Cavani. Uruguay finished in third place in their group and progressed to the knock out stages; however, Figueroa only played in the final group stage game and was substituted off the field after 21 minutes of the game. Uruguay played against the United States in the Round of 16 and would end up losing 2–1 in extra time, Figueroa was substituted on to the field in the 108th minute.
