= Anıl Taşdemir =

Turkish footballer

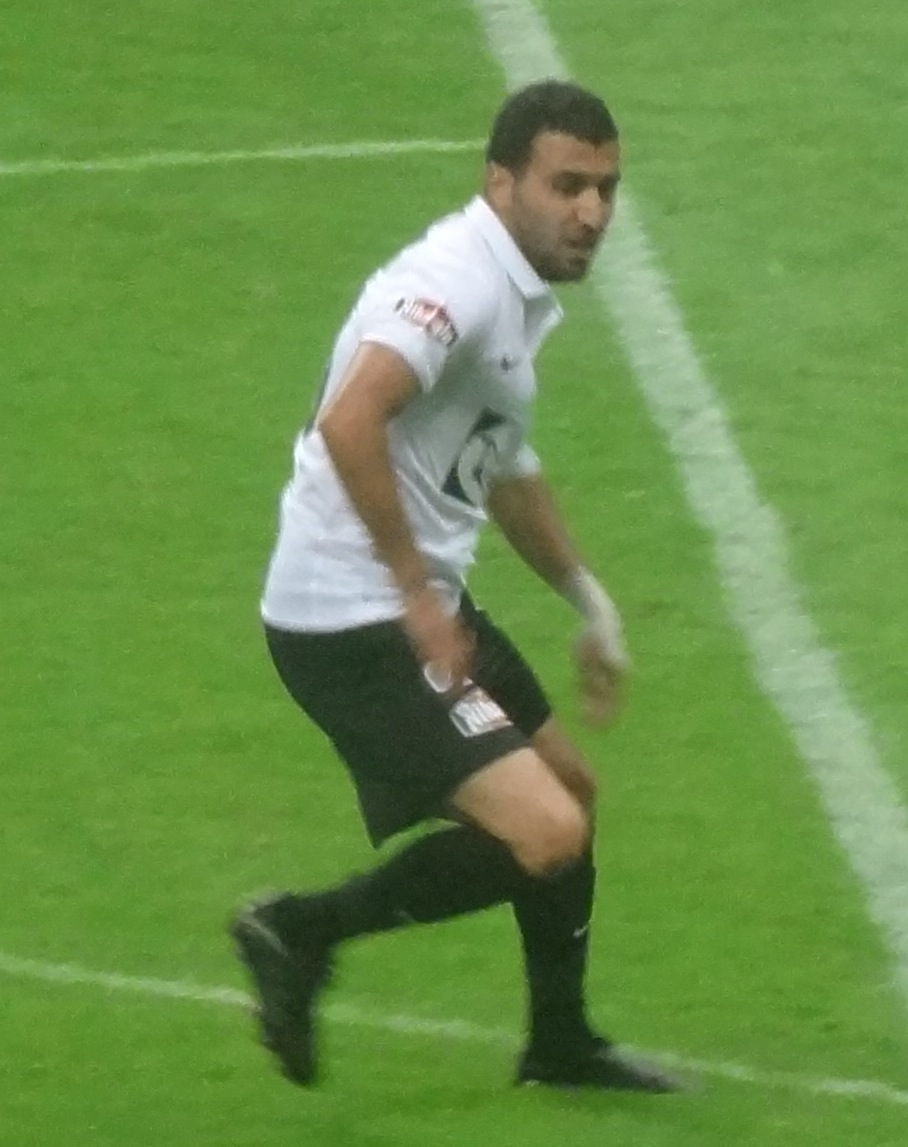

Personal information
- Date of birth: 1 January 1988 (age 38)
- Place of birth: Söke, Turkey
- Height: 1.85 m (6 ft 1 in)
- Position: Central midfielder

Team information
- Current team: Nazilli Belediyespor
- Number: 10

Youth career
- 1999–2004: Sökespor
- 2004–2005: Göztepe

Senior career*
Years	Team	Apps	(Gls)
2004–2006	Göztepe	36	(3)
2006–2010	Ankaraspor	31	(1)
2008	→ Diyarbakırspor (loan)	10	(0)
2010	→ Bugsaşspor (loan)	6	(2)
2010–2011	Samsunspor	4	(0)
2011–2013	Akhisar Belediyespor	59	(11)
2013–2014	Orduspor	40	(17)
2014	Trabzonspor	0	(0)
2014–2015	Kayserispor	27	(3)
2015–2016	Adana Demirspor	27	(3)
2016–2017	Denizlispor	34	(1)
2018	Fethiyespor	12	(5)
2018	Fatih Karagümrük	0	(0)
2019	Adanaspor	4	(0)
2019–2022	Balıkesirspor	59	(6)
2022–2023	52 Orduspor	6	(1)
2023–	Nazilli Belediyespor	2	(0)

International career
2004–2005	Turkey U17	16	(1)
2005	Turkey U18	2	(0)
2006	Turkey U19	2	(0)
2008	Turkey U20	1	(0)
- * Club domestic league appearances and goals as of 23 September 2023

Anıl Taşdemir (born 1 January 1988) is a Turkish footballer who plays as a central midfielder for Nazilli Belediyespor.

He previously played for Göztepe, Ankaraspor, Diyarbakırspor, Bugsaşspor, Akhisar Belediyespor and Orduspor, and represented Turkey internationally at levels from under-17 to under-20.
