= Emre Balak =

Turkish footballer (born 1988)

Personal information
- Date of birth: August 11, 1988 (age 38)
- Place of birth: Samsun, Turkey
- Height: 1.77 m (5 ft 10 in)
- Position: Defender

Team information
- Current team: Aliağa FK

Youth career
- 1999–2003: Merzifonspor
- 2004–2005: Samsunspor

Senior career*
Years	Team	Apps	(Gls)
2005–2008	Samsunspor	70	(4)
2008–2011	Gençlerbirliği	14	(0)
2011–2012	Tavşanlı Linyitspor	6	(0)
2012	Gölbaşıspor	5	(0)
2012–2014	Bucaspor	15	(0)
2014–2017	Kocaeli Birlikspor	70	(2)
2017–2018	Nazilli Belediyespor	10	(0)
2018–2019	BB Bodrumspor	26	(2)
2019	Fethiyespor	8	(1)
2019–	Aliağa FK	5	(1)

International career^{‡}
2008	Turkey U21	2	(0)
- * Club domestic league appearances and goals ‡ National team caps and goals as of 23 March 2019

Emre Balak (born 11 August 1988 in Samsun, Turkey) is a Turkish footballer. He currently plays as a defender for Aliağa FK.
