= Vinícius (footballer, born January 1988) =

Brazilian footballer

Personal information
- Full name: Vinícius Alberto Nunes
- Date of birth: January 7, 1988 (age 38)
- Place of birth: Capivari, Brazil
- Height: 1.82 m (6 ft 0 in)
- Positions: Left back; midfielder

Team information
- Current team: Ituano Futebol Clube
- Number: 30

Youth career
- 2006: Palmeiras

Senior career*
| Years | Team | Apps | (Gls) |
| 2007 | Palmeiras | 1 | (0) |
| 2008 | Ituano | | |
- * Club domestic league appearances and goals

Vinícius Alberto Nunes or simply Vinícius (born January 7, 1988, in Capivari), is a Brazilian player at the positions of left back and midfielder. He currently plays for Ituano Futebol Clube.

He made his professional debut for Palmeiras in a 2–1 home win over Náutico in the Campeonato Brasileiro on October 4, 2007.
