= Yoann de Boer =

French footballer (born 1982)

Personal information
- Date of birth: 27 January 1982 (age 44)
- Place of birth: Marseille, France
- Height: 1.85 m (6 ft 1 in)
- Position: Defensive midfielder

Youth career
- Marseille
- Willem II

Senior career*
Years	Team	Apps	(Gls)
2002–2008	FC Eindhoven	171	(7)
2008–2010	FC Den Bosch	38	(2)
2010–2014	Fortuna Sittard	112	(3)
2014–2016	Kozakken Boys	46	(2)
- * Club domestic league appearances and goals as of 7 August 2015 (UTC)

Yoann de Boer (born 27 January 1982) is a French former professional footballer who played as a defensive midfielder for FC Eindhoven, FC Den Bosch, Fortuna Sittard and Kozakken Boys.
