= Igor (footballer, born 1988) =

Brazilian footballer

Personal information
- Full name: Igor Siqueira Pessanha
- Date of birth: June 14, 1988 (age 38)
- Place of birth: Campos, RJ, Brazil
- Height: 1.79 m (5 ft 10 in)
- Position: Striker

Team information
- Current team: Santo André

Youth career
- Cruzeiro
- 2004–2006: Corinthians

Senior career*
Years	Team	Apps	(Gls)
2006–2007	Corinthians	3	(0)
2006	→ Juventude (loan)	2	(0)
2007	Adap Galo		
2007–2010	Sevilla Atlético	15	(1)
2009	→ Belenenses (loan)	3	(0)
2010	Atlético-PR	0	(0)
2011–	Santo André		

International career
- Brazil U-15
2005	Brazil U-17		
- * Club domestic league appearances and goals

Igor Siqueira Pessanha or simply Igor (born 14 June 1988 in Campos dos Goytacazes, Rio de Janeiro state) is a Brazilian footballer who currently plays as a striker for Santo André in Brazil.

== Club career ==
Igor moved to Campeonato Brasileiro Série C club, Adap Galo Maringá from Corinthians for the 2007 season. He was transferred to Sevilla on 1 August 2007 on a five-year contract.

== International career ==
He participated in the 2005 FIFA World U-17 Cup for Brazil, and played the whole final where they lost 3-0 to Mexico. He was joint runner-up to the golden boot, bagging four goals in the tournament.

He has played for various levels at the national set-up from U-15 to U-17, scoring a total of 37 goals in 50 games .
