= Melvin Zaalman =

Dutch footballer

Personal information
- Date of birth: 17 June 1988 (age 38)
- Place of birth: Rotterdam, Netherlands
- Height: 1.67 m (5 ft 6 in)
- Position: Winger

Youth career
- SV Bolnes
- Sparta Rotterdam

Senior career*
| Years | Team | Apps | (Gls) |
| 2006–2010 | Sparta II | | |
| 2010 | → Dordrecht (loan) | 3 | (0) |
| 2010–2011 | ARC | 17 | (4) |
| 2011–2013 | Nieuwenhoorn | | |
| 2013–2015 | SV Bolnes | | |
| 2015–2016 | RVVH | 9 | (1) |
| 2016–2018 | SV Heinenoord | | |
| 2018–2019 | Rijsoord | | |
| Total | | 29 | (5) |
- * Club domestic league appearances and goals

Melvin Zaalman (born 17 June 1988) is a Dutch former footballer who plays as a winger.
