= Konan Serge Kouadio =

Ivorian footballer (born 1988)

Serge Kouadio
Personal information
- Full name: Serges Konan Kouadio
- Date of birth: 31 December 1988 (age 37)
- Place of birth: Abidjan, Ivory Coast
- Height: 1.77 m (5 ft 10 in)
- Position: Midfielder

Team information
- Current team: Widad Fez

Youth career
- 2001–2005: Académie de Sol Beni

Senior career*
Years	Team	Apps	(Gls)
2006–2007	ASEC Mimosas	5	(1)
2007–2009	Charlton Athletic	0	(0)
2007–2008	→ Fredrikstad (loan)	8	(0)
2008–2009	→ AS Cherbourg (loan)	3	(0)
2010–2013	AFAD Djékanou		
2013	COD Meknès		
2013–	Widad Fez		
- * Club domestic league appearances and goals

Konan Serge Kouadio (born 31 December 1988, in Abidjan) is an Ivorian footballer, who currently plays for Moroccan side Widad Fez.

== Career ==
He plays as a striker. He began his career with Académie de Sol Beni and was promoted in 2006 to ASEC Mimosas, before joining Charlton Athletic. For work permit reasons, he was loaned out to Fredrikstad F.K. In July 2008, he was loaned out from Charlton to AS Cherbourg.
