= Jeffrey Sarpong =

Dutch footballer (born 1988)

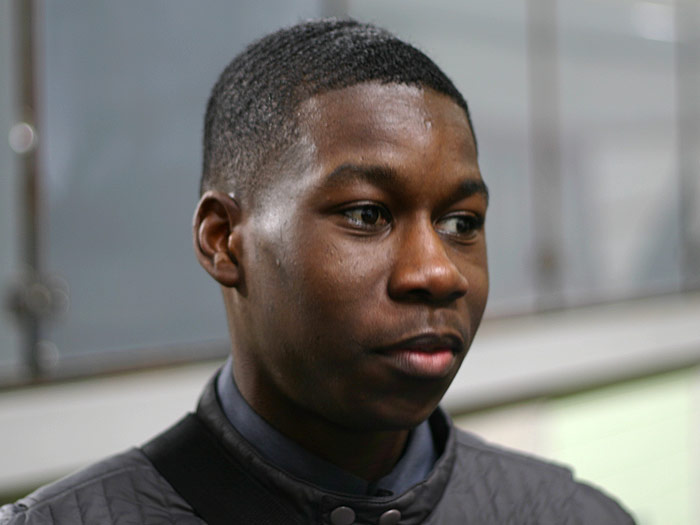

Personal information
- Full name: Jeffrey Nana Darko Sarpong
- Date of birth: 3 August 1988 (age 38)
- Place of birth: Amsterdam, Netherlands
- Height: 1.76 m (5 ft 9 in)
- Position: Attacking midfielder

Youth career
- –1995: Abcoude
- 1995–2005: Ajax

Senior career*
Years	Team	Apps	(Gls)
2006–2010	Ajax	20	(2)
2010	→ NEC (loan)	15	(0)
2010–2013	Real Sociedad	19	(1)
2012	→ NAC Breda (loan)	11	(1)
2012–2013	→ Hércules (loan)	13	(1)
2013–2015	NAC Breda	58	(4)
2015–2016	Wellington Phoenix	13	(0)
2016–2017	Veria	24	(5)
2017–2018	Elazığspor	19	(1)
2018–2019	Xanthi	21	(0)
2021–2024	FK Panevėžys	128	(18)
Total		341	(33)

International career
2003–2009	Netherlands U21	10	(1)
Medal record
Representing Netherlands
UEFA European Under-17 Championship
Runner-up	Italy 2005	U-17 Team
- * Club domestic league appearances and goals

Jeffrey Nana Darko Sarpong (/sɑːrˈpɒŋ/ sar-PONG-G; born 3 August 1988) is a Dutch former professional footballer who plays as an attacking midfielder.

== Career ==
=== Ajax ===
Sarpong joined Ajax when he was just seven years of age, and signed his first contract in 2005. At the time Chelsea were interested in signing the player, but he decided to stay with Ajax.

He made his Eredivisie debut on 5 February 2006 in the 3–2 away defeat against Feyenoord. Sarpong played in eight more league matches during the season. In addition he and his team won the KNVB Cup, but in the 2006–07 season he did not play a single league match. In July 2007, Sarpong extended his contract, which kept him until 2011. However, the following season he became first-team regular under new coach Marco van Basten netting his first goal in a 2–2 away draw against no other than Feyenoord. A week later, on 2 October 2008, he scored again, in the first round of UEFA Cup; second leg, against Borac Čačak.

The 2009–10 season was difficult for Sarpong to gain back his valuable first-team experience by being placed on a loan list. Having yet make his first league appearance for Ajax this season, Sarpong says he's very "eager" and "desperate" to make a return in the first team.

On 31 December 2009, Ajax loaned the 21-year-old Dutch youth international to NEC until the end of the 2009–10 season. He made his debut for the club in a 2–1 win over Vitesse Arnhem. In the quarter-final of KNVB Beker, against his former club, Sarpong provided assist for the second goal for the club in a match, but was sent off after a second bookable offense, as NEC lost 3–2. Two months later, on 19 March 2010, he was sent off again in the last minutes, as NEC heavily lost 4–1 against Heerenveen. Having made an impressive start at NEC, Sarpong hinted he might have earned a spot in the World Cup. At the end of the 2009/10 season, the club announced that they would not sign Sarpong on a permanent basis. He made sixteen appearances in all competitions.

=== Real Sociedad ===
On 2 August 2010, it emerged that the La Liga side Real Sociedad were interested in Jeffrey. But no official bid was made until the 15th. On the 21st it was rumoured he was in San Sebastián and on the following day Real Sociedad confirmed the signing of Jeffrey Sarpong for an undisclosed fee. Sarpong was given the number 14 shirt.

After his debut was delayed over injuries and problem, Sarpong finally his debut on 3 October 2010 in a 1–0 home victory to Espanyol and the next game, on 17 October 2010, Sarpong scored his first goal in a 2–1 loss against Levante. A week later, on 28 October 2010, Sarpong scored again, in the fourth round of Copa Del Ray; first round, in a 3–2 loss against Almería. He soon went on the sidelines after sustaining a dislocated shoulder during a training-ground clash, which left him out for a months. But made his return on 6 November 2010, in a 1–0 win over Racing Santander. Despite a promising start at the club, Sarpong had a disappointing season, having made 18 appearances. The next season, even his first team became increasingly limited, under manager Philippe Montanier and made only three appearances.

On 5 January 2013, Sarpong terminated his contract at Sociedad by mutual consent after three-year at the club.

=== Loan spell ===
On the last day of the winter transfer window, Sarpong joined NAC Breda on loan for the rest of the season. On 11 February 2012, he made his debut for the club, coming on as a substitute for Ömer Bayram, in a 2–0 loss against his former club, Ajax. On 28 April 2012, Sarpong scored his first goal for the club, in a 3–1 win over Utrecht.

On 30 August 2012, it announced that Sarpong joined Segunda División side Hércules for the rest of the season. He made his debut for the club, on 2 September 2012, in a 1–0 loss against Alcorcón after coming on as a substitute in the 80th minute. After five months at the club, Sarpong left the club, following his release from Real Sociedad.

=== Return to NAC Breda and free agency ===
After a trial with Premier League side, Stoke City as well as Football League Championship club, Sheffield Wednesday in January, it was announced on 9 April 2013 that Sarpong had rejoined NAC Breda on a three-year deal with the club, starting in the next season. The deal was cut short, and Sarpong was released at the end of the 2014–15 season. He has since been on trial with Football League Championship team, Blackburn Rovers, and appeared in a friendly match against Tranmere Rovers, scoring his side's first goal. The match concluded 2–0 to Blackburn.

=== Wellington Phoenix ===
Sarpong joined Wellington Phoenix FC after he signed for them on 25 August 2015, he was released on 31 January 2016 by mutual consent.

=== Later career ===
On 9 August 2016, Sarpong agreed to move on a free transfer to the Greek Superleague club Veria. In 2017, Sarpong went to play in Turkey at Elazığspor. He was allowed to leave in May 2018. In the 2018–19 season, Sarpong played for Greek club Xanthi. On 10 February 2021, he signed for Lithuanian side FK Panevėžys.

== International career ==
Sarpong represented the Netherlands in the 2005 FIFA U-17 World Championship in Peru, where the team finished third. On 24 June 2009, the young midfielder swapped representing the Netherlands internationally for The Black Stars of Ghana. He maintain his desire to play for The Black Stars ahead of the Africa Cup of Nations.

== Personal life ==
He became the second Junior Dutch International to swap The Netherlands for Ghana after Quincy Owusu-Abeyie turned out for Holland at the 2005 FIFA World Youth Championship.

Sarpong was married on 24 May 2012.

Sarpong leads the Dutch branch of a bible study for footballers called Ballers in God, which includes players such as Vicente Besuijen, Elson Hooi and Kingsley Ehizibue.

== Career statistics ==
As of 25 October 2011

Appearances and goals by club, season and competition
Club	Season	League			National cup (Note: Includes KNVB Cup, Copa del Rey.)		Continental		Total	
Club	Season	Division	Apps	Goals	Apps	Goals	Apps	Goals	Apps	Goals
Ajax	2005–06	Eredivisie	9	0					9	0
Ajax	2006–07	Eredivisie								
Ajax	2007–08	Eredivisie	1	0					1	0
Ajax	2008–09	Eredivisie	10	1			3	0	13	1
Ajax	2010–11	Eredivisie	0	0	0	0	1	0	1	0
NEC (loan)	2009–10	Eredivisie	15	0	1	0			16	0
Real Sociedad	2010–11	La Liga	19	1	1	1	0	0	20	2
Real Sociedad	2011–12	La Liga	3	0					3	0
Real Sociedad	2012–13	La Liga	0	0	0	0			0	0
NAC Breda (loan)	2011–12	Eredivisie	11	1					11	1
Hércules (loan)	2012–13	Segunda División	13	1	0	0			13	1
NAC Breda	2013–14	Eredivisie	0	0					0	0
Career total			79	4	1	0	4	0	84	4
