= Roberto (footballer, born 1988) =

Brazilian footballer

Personal information
- Full name: Roberto Andrade Silva
- Date of birth: April 24, 1988 (age 38)
- Place of birth: Tucano-BA, Brazil
- Height: 1.76 m (5 ft 9 in)
- Position: Defensive midfielder

Team information
- Current team: São Bento

Youth career
- 2000–2003: Portuguesa-SP

Senior career*
Years	Team	Apps	(Gls)
2003–2005	Guarani		
2005–2008	Atlético-PR	11	(0)
2009	Caxias	16	(1)
2010	Avaí	0	(0)
2010–2011	Grêmio Barueri	20	(0)
2012	Volta Redonda	8	(0)
2013	Palmas		
2013	Cuiabá	2	(0)
2013–	São Bento		

International career
2007	Brazil U20	1	(0)
- * Club domestic league appearances and goals

Roberto Andrade Silva or simply Roberto (born April 24, 1988) is a Brazilian footballer who plays as a defensive midfielder for Esporte Clube São Bento.

== Career ==
He made his professional debut in Campeonato Brasileiro with a 6–3 away win against Figueirense on May 12, 2007 as 62nd-minute substitute for Alan Bahia.
