= 2005 FIFA U-17 World Championship =

FIFA U-17 World Championship Peru 2005 Copa Mundial de Fútbol Sub-17 de 2005

Tournament details
- Host country: Peru
- Dates: 16 September – 2 October
- Teams: 16 (from 6 confederations)
- Venues: 5 (in 5 host cities)

Final positions
- Champions: Mexico (1st title)
- Runners-up: Brazil
- Third place: Netherlands
- Fourth place: Turkey

Tournament statistics
- Matches played: 32
- Goals scored: 111 (3.47 per match)
- Attendance: 551,817 (17,244 per match)
- Top scorer(s): (Mexico) Carlos Vela (5 goals)
- Best player: (Brazil) Anderson
- Fair play award: North Korea

The 2005 FIFA U-17 World Championship, the eleventh edition of the tournament, was held in the cities of Lima, Trujillo, Chiclayo, Piura, and Iquitos in Peru from 16 September to 2 October 2005. Players born after 1 January 1988 could participate in this tournament. Mexico beat favorites and defending champions Brazil 3–0 in the final, winning its first U-17 Championship title.

== Venues ==
Lima	Chiclayo
Estadio Nacional; Capacity: 47,000	Estadio Elías Aguirre; Capacity: 25,000
Iquitos	2005 FIFA U-17 World Championship is located in Peru
Estadio Max Augustín; Capacity: 25,000	2005 FIFA U-17 World Championship is located in Peru
Piura	Trujillo
Estadio Miguel Grau; Capacity: 26,550	Estadio Mansiche; Capacity: 25,000

== Teams ==
Confederation	Qualifying Tournament	Qualifier(s)
AFC (Asia)	2004 AFC U-17 Championship	China; North Korea; Qatar
CAF (Africa)	2005 African U-17 Championship	Gambia; Ghana; Ivory Coast
CONCACAF (North, Central America & Caribbean)	2005 CONCACAF U17 Tournament	United States; Mexico; Costa Rica
CONMEBOL (South America)	Host nation	Peru
CONMEBOL (South America)	2005 South American U-17 Championship	Brazil; Uruguay
OFC (Oceania)	2005 OFC Under 17 Tournament	Australia
UEFA (Europe)	2005 UEFA European Under-17 Championship	Turkey; Netherlands; Italy

- USA is the only team to have qualified for all 11 tournaments so far, followed by Brazil and Australia who have each qualified 10 times. While Netherlands, Turkey, Peru, Gambia and Korea DPR are new to the competition.

== Squads ==
For a list of the squads see 2005 FIFA U-17 World Championship squads

== Group stage ==
All times are local, PET (UTC−5).

=== Group A ===
Team	Pts	Pld	W	D	L	GF	GA	GD
Costa Rica	5	3	1	2	0	4	2	+2
China	5	3	1	2	0	3	2	+1
Ghana	3	3	0	3	0	3	3	0
Peru (H)	1	3	0	1	2	1	4	−3

16 September 2005
17:00

China	1–1	Costa Rica
Tang Naixin 17'	Report	Carrillo 10'

Estadio Mansiche, Trujillo
Attendance: 18,000
Referee: Toru Kamikawa (Japan)

16 September 2005
20:00

Peru	1–1	Ghana
Chávez 10' (pen.)	Report	Cárdenas 62' (o.g.)

Estadio Mansiche, Trujillo
Attendance: 21,100
Referee: Frank De Bleeckere (Belgium)

19 September 2005
15:30

Ghana	1–1	Costa Rica
Quartey 58'	Report	Borges 47'

Estadio Mansiche, Trujillo
Attendance: 15,000
Referee: Jorge Larrionda (Uruguay)

19 September 2005
18:15

Peru	0–1	China
	Report	Deng Zhuoxiang 13'

Estadio Mansiche, Trujillo
Attendance: 20,000
Referee: Óscar Ruiz (Colombia)

22 September 2005
18:15

Costa Rica	2–0	Peru
Solórzano 45+1'; Elizondo 76'	Report

Estadio Max Augustín, Iquitos
Attendance: 25,000
Referee: Mark Shield (Australia)

22 September 2005
18:15

Ghana	1–1	China
Bukari 56'	Report	Wang Xuanhong 60'

Estadio Miguel Grau, Piura
Attendance: 15,320
Referee: Alain Hamer (Luxembourg)

=== Group B ===
Team	Pts	Pld	W	D	L	GF	GA	GD
Turkey	9	3	3	0	0	6	3	+3
Mexico	6	3	2	0	1	6	2	+4
Australia	3	3	1	0	2	2	5	−3
Uruguay	0	3	0	0	3	3	7	−4

16 September 2005
14:15

Uruguay	0–2	Mexico
	Report	Vela 47'; Villaluz 54'

Estadio Nacional, Lima
Attendance: 8,000
Referee: Alain Hamer (Luxembourg)

16 September 2005
17:00

Turkey	1–0	Australia
Şahin 84'	Report

Estadio Nacional, Lima
Attendance: 14,200
Referee: Kevin Stott (United States)

19 September 2005
15:30

Mexico	3–0	Australia
Esparza 20'; Vela 43', 79'	Report

Estadio Nacional, Lima
Attendance: 6,000
Referee: Horacio Elizondo (Argentina)

19 September 2005
18:15

Uruguay	2–3	Turkey
Duruer 28' (o.g.); Figueroa 78'	Report	Yılmaz 12'; Özcan 80'; Köse 84'

Estadio Nacional, Lima
Attendance: 4,000
Referee: Mourad Daami (Tunisia)

22 September 2005
15:30

Australia	2–1	Uruguay
Burns 20'; Kruse 83'	Report	Figueroa 38'

Estadio Elías Aguirre, Chiclayo
Attendance: 11,100
Referee: Jerome Damon (South Africa)

22 September 2005
15:30

Mexico	1–2	Turkey
Guzmán 11'	Report	Yılmaz 28'; Erkin 90+1'

Estadio Miguel Grau, Piura
Attendance: 14,560
Referee: Toru Kamikawa (Japan)

=== Group C ===
Team	Pts	Pld	W	D	L	GF	GA	GD
United States	7	3	2	1	0	7	4	+3
North Korea	4	3	1	1	1	6	4	+2
Italy	4	3	1	1	1	6	7	−1
Ivory Coast	1	3	0	1	2	4	8	−4

17 September 2005
10:00

Ivory Coast	3–4	Italy
Diomande 27'; Fofana 53'; Kouassi 87'	Report	Tiboni 21', 32'; Mandorlini 86'; Foti 89'

Estadio Elías Aguirre, Chiclayo
Attendance: 14,800
Referee: Subkhiddin Salleh (Malaysia)

17 September 2005
12:45

United States	3–2	North Korea
Soroka 13'; Nakazawa 43'; Zimmerman 72'	Report	Choe Myong-ho 24'; Kim Kuk-jin 86'

Estadio Elías Aguirre, Chiclayo
Attendance: 15,200
Referee: Jerome Damon (South Africa)

20 September 2005
15:30

Italy	1–3	United States
Russotto 74'	Report	Sarkodie 47'; Nakazawa 67'; Soroka 90'

Estadio Elías Aguirre, Chiclayo
Attendance: 15,240
Referee: Mark Shield (Australia)

20 September 2005
18:15

Ivory Coast	0–3	North Korea
	Report	Choe Myong-ho 9' (pen.), 38'; Kim Kyong-il 44'

Estadio Elías Aguirre, Chiclayo
Attendance: 14,500
Referee: Frank De Bleeckere (Belgium)

23 September 2005
15:30

United States	1–1	Ivory Coast
Hall 4'	Report	Bamba 87'

Estadio Nacional, Lima
Attendance: 12,000
Referee: Óscar Ruiz (Colombia)

23 September 2005
15:30

Italy	1–1	North Korea
Palermo 90'	Report	Kim Kuk-jin 22'

Estadio Mansiche, Trujillo
Attendance: 10,000
Referee: Mourad Daami (Tunisia)

=== Group D ===
Team	Pts	Pld	W	D	L	GF	GA	GD
Brazil	6	3	2	0	1	9	4	+5
Netherlands	6	3	2	0	1	8	5	+3
Gambia	6	3	2	0	1	6	4	+2
Qatar	0	3	0	0	3	4	14	−10

17 September 2005
15:15

Netherlands	5–3	Qatar
Emnes 6', 85'; Buijs 30' (pen.); Van der Kooy 58'; Goossens 65'	Report	Afif 11' (pen.); Ahmed 31'; Ibrahim 83'

Estadio Miguel Grau, Piura
Attendance: 20,800
Referee: Mark Shield (Australia)

17 September 2005
18:00

Brazil	1–3	Gambia
Igor 23'	Report	Mansally 27'; Ceesay 45'; Jallow 74' (pen.)

Estadio Miguel Grau, Piura
Attendance: 22,300
Referee: Marco Rodríguez (Mexico)

20 September 2005
15:30

Qatar	1–3	Gambia
Ahmed 31'	Report	Ceesay 24'; Jallow 74' (pen.); Jagne 90+2'

Estadio Miguel Grau, Piura
Attendance: 18,424
Referee: Subkhiddin Salleh (Malaysia)

20 September 2005
18:15

Netherlands	1–2	Brazil
Sindei 28' (o.g.)	Report	Igor 8'; Ramón 60'

Estadio Miguel Grau, Piura
Attendance: 20,749
Referee: Kevin Stott (United States)

23 September 2005
18:15

Gambia	0–2	Netherlands
	Report	Goossens 33'; Marcellis 72'

Estadio Nacional, Lima
Attendance: 17,000
Referee: Jorge Larrionda (Uruguay)

23 September 2005
18:15

Qatar	0–6	Brazil
	Report	Ramón 13', 45+2'; Denílson 39'; Roberto 57'; Augusto 58'; Anderson 74'

Estadio Mansiche, Trujillo
Attendance: 15,000
Referee: Frank De Bleeckere (Belgium)

== Knockout stage ==
=== Bracket ===
Quarter-finals
25 September - Piura
Costa Rica	1
Mexico (a.e.t.)	3
26 September - Trujillo
United States	0
Netherlands	2
25 September - Iquitos
Turkey	5
China	1
26 September - Iquitos
Brazil (a.e.t.)	3
North Korea	1

Semi-finals
29 September - Chiclayo
Mexico	4
Netherlands	0
29 September - Trujillo
Turkey	3
Brazil	4

Final
2 October - Lima
Mexico	3
Brazil	0
Third place
October 2 - Lima
Netherlands	2
Turkey	1

=== Quarter-finals ===
25 September 2005
16:00

Costa Rica	1–3 (a.e.t.)	Mexico
Juárez 67' (o.g.)	Report	Juárez 88'; Guzmán 96'; Vela 109'

Estadio Miguel Grau, Piura
Attendance: 14,724
Referee: Subkhiddin Salleh (Malaysia)

25 September 2005
19:00

Turkey	5–1	China
Köse 10', 88'; Erkin 33', 90+1'; Şahin 54'	Report	Yang Xu 57'

Estadio Max Augustín, Iquitos
Attendance: 24,000
Referee: Marco Rodríguez (Mexico)

26 September 2005
16:00

United States	0–2	Netherlands
	Report	Sarpong 45+1', 84'

Estadio Mansiche, Trujillo
Attendance: 9,000
Referee: Horacio Elizondo (Argentina)

26 September 2005
19:00

Brazil	3–1 (a.e.t.)	North Korea
Ramón 48'; Celsinho 100'; Igor 120+3'	Report	Kim Kyong-il 82'

Estadio Max Augustín, Iquitos
Attendance: 25,000
Referee: Alain Hamer (Luxembourg)

=== Semi-finals ===
29 September 2005
16:00

Mexico	4–0	Netherlands
Villaluz 33', 61'; Moreno 50'; Guzmán 90'	Report

Estadio Elías Aguirre, Chiclayo
Attendance: 16,800
Referee: Mark Shield (Australia)

29 September 2005
19:00

Turkey	3–4	Brazil
Erkin 47'; Köse 70'; Şahin 76'	Report	Celsinho 1'; Anderson 26'; Marcelo 32'; Igor 90'

Estadio Mansiche, Trujillo
Attendance: 19,000
Referee: Frank De Bleeckere (Belgium)

=== Third place playoff ===
2 October 2005
15:00

Netherlands	2–1	Turkey
Goossens 13', 88'	Report	Şahin 90'

Estadio Nacional, Lima
Attendance: 35,000
Referee: Jorge Larrionda (Uruguay)

=== Final ===
2 October 2005
18:00

Mexico	3–0	Brazil
Vela 31'; Esparza 33'; Guzmán 86'	Report

Estadio Nacional, Lima
Attendance: 40,000
Referee: Frank De Bleeckere (Belgium)

== Awards ==
Golden Ball	Silver Ball	Bronze Ball
(Brazil) Anderson	(Mexico) Giovani dos Santos	(Turkey) Nuri Şahin
Golden Shoe	Silver Shoe	Bronze Shoe
(Mexico) Carlos Vela	(Turkey) Nuri Şahin	(Turkey) Tevfik Köse
5 goals	4 goals	4 goals
FIFA Fair Play Award
North Korea

== Goalscorers ==
Carlos Vela of Mexico won the Golden Shoe award for scoring five goals.

There were 111 goals scored in 32 matches, for an average of 3.47 goals per match.

5 goals

- (Mexico) Carlos Vela

4 goals

- (Brazil) Igor
- (Brazil) Ramón
- (Mexico) Éver Guzmán
- (Netherlands) John Goossens
- (Turkey) Caner Erkin
- (Turkey) Nuri Şahin
- (Turkey) Tevfik Köse

3 goals

- (Mexico) César Villaluz
- (North Korea) Choe Myong-ho

2 goals

- (Brazil) Anderson
- (Brazil) Celsinho
- (The Gambia) Momodou Ceesay
- (The Gambia) Ousman Jallow
- (Italy) Christian Tiboni
- (Mexico) Omar Esparza
- (Netherlands) Jeffrey Sarpong
- (Netherlands) Marvin Emnes
- (North Korea) Kim Kuk-jin
- (North Korea) Kim Kyong-il
- (Turkey) Deniz Yılmaz
- (Qatar) Yusef Ahmed
- (United States) Kyle Nakazawa
- (United States) Ryan Soroka
- (Uruguay) Elías Ricardo Figueroa

1 goal

- (Australia) Nathan Burns
- (Australia) Robbie Kruse
- (Brazil) Denílson
- (Brazil) Marcelo
- (Brazil) Renato Augusto
- (Brazil) Roberto
- (China) Deng Zhuoxiang
- (China) Tang Naixin
- (China) Wang Xuanhong
- (China) Yang Xu
- (Costa Rica) Celso Borges
- (Costa Rica) Cesar Elizondo
- (Costa Rica) Jean Carlos Solórzano
- (Costa Rica) Roberto Carrillo
- (The Gambia) Kenny Mansally
- (The Gambia) Pa Modou Jagne
- (Ghana) Jonathan Quartey
- (Ghana) Sadat Bukari
- (Italy) Andrea Russotto
- (Italy) Matteo Mandorlini
- (Italy) Salvatore Foti
- (Italy) Simone Palermo
- (Ivory Coast) Alassane Diomande
- (Ivory Coast) Ismael Fofana
- (Ivory Coast) Koffi Kouassi
- (Ivory Coast) Siaka Bamba
- (Mexico) Efraín Juárez
- (Mexico) Héctor Moreno
- (Netherlands) Dirk Marcellis
- (Netherlands) Jordy Buijs
- (Netherlands) Mike van der Kooy
- (Peru) Daniel Chávez
- (Qatar) Ali Afif
- (Qatar) Khalfan Ibrahim
- (Turkey) Özgürcan Özcan
- (United States) Jeremy Hall
- (United States) Ofori Sarkodie
- (United States) Preston Zimmerman

1 own goal

- (Brazil) Sidnei (against Netherlands)
- (Mexico) Efraín Juárez (against Costa Rica)
- (Peru) Miguel Cárdenas (against Ghana)
- (Turkey) Murat Duruer (against Uruguay)

== Final ranking ==
Rank	Team	Pld	W	D	L	GF	GA	GD	Pts
1	Mexico	6	5	0	1	16	3	+13	15
2	Brazil	6	4	0	2	16	11	+5	12
3	Netherlands	6	4	0	2	12	10	+2	12
4	Turkey	6	4	0	2	15	10	+5	12
Eliminated in the quarter-finals
5	United States	4	2	1	1	7	6	+1	7
6	Costa Rica	4	1	2	1	5	5	0	5
7	China	4	1	2	1	4	7	–3	5
8	North Korea	4	1	1	2	7	7	0	4
Eliminated at the group stage
9	Gambia	3	2	0	1	6	4	+2	6
10	Italy	3	1	1	1	6	7	–1	4
11	Ghana	3	0	3	0	3	3	0	3
12	Australia	3	1	0	2	2	5	–3	3
13	Peru	3	0	1	2	1	4	–3	1
14	Ivory Coast	3	0	1	2	4	8	–4	1
15	Uruguay	3	0	0	3	3	7	–4	0
16	Qatar	3	0	0	3	4	14	–10	0
