= Tang Naixin =

Chinese footballer

Tang Naixin 唐乃鑫
Personal information
- Full name: 唐乃鑫
- Date of birth: April 29, 1988 (age 38)
- Place of birth: Qingdao, China
- Height: 1.84 m (6 ft 1/2 in)
- Position: Defender

Senior career*
Years	Team	Apps	(Gls)
2006–2009	Chengdu Wuniu	5	(0)
2007–2008	→ Tianjin Songjiang (loan)	?	(?)
2009	Sichuan FC	9	(0)
- * Club domestic league appearances and goals

Tang Naixin (Simplified Chinese: 唐乃鑫) (born April 29, 1988 in Qingdao) is a Chinese football player.
