= Miguel Cárdenas (footballer) =

Paraguayan footballer (born 1978)

Personal information
- Full name: Miguel Ángel Cárdenas Ferreira
- Date of birth: 8 September 1978 (age 48)
- Place of birth: Altos, Paraguay
- Height: 1.79 m (5 ft 10 in)
- Position: Goalkeeper

Senior career*
Years	Team	Apps	(Gls)
2000–2003	Sol de América	52	(0)
2004–2006	Nacional Asución	78	(0)
2006	3 de Febrero	18	(0)
2007–2012	Tiro Federal	88	(0)
2012–2013	Alvear FBC	23	(0)
2013–2014	Estudiantes de Río Cuarto	22	(0)
Total		298	(0)
- * Club domestic league appearances and goals

Miguel Ángel Cárdenas Ferreira (born 8 September 1978) is a Paraguayan footballer who plays as a goalkeeper for Tiro Federal of the Torneo Argentino A in Argentina.
