= Tumelo Nhlapo =

South African soccer player

Personal information
- Full name: Tumelo Christopher Nhlapo
- Date of birth: 20 January 1988 (age 38)
- Place of birth: Parys, South Africa
- Height: 1.60 m (5 ft 3 in)
- Position: Defender

Youth career
- Small Dangerous FC
- Real Hearts FC
- Small Rangers FC
- –2007: Harmony Academy

Senior career*
Years	Team	Apps	(Gls)
2007–2010	Bloemfontein Celtic		
- * Club domestic league appearances and goals

Tumelo Nhlapo (born 20 January 1988) is a South African soccer player.

== Career ==
Nhlapo was born in Parys. He made his senior debut for Bloemfontein Celtic on 8 August 2007 against Mamelodi Sundowns in the South African Premier Division. After 15 senior appearances for Celtic, he was called up to the South African national team squad for the 2008 Africa Cup of Nations but did not play at the tournament. Nhlapo left Bloemfontein Celtic after refusing to sign a contract extension ahead of the 2010–11 season.
