= List of Dutch football transfers summer 2008 =

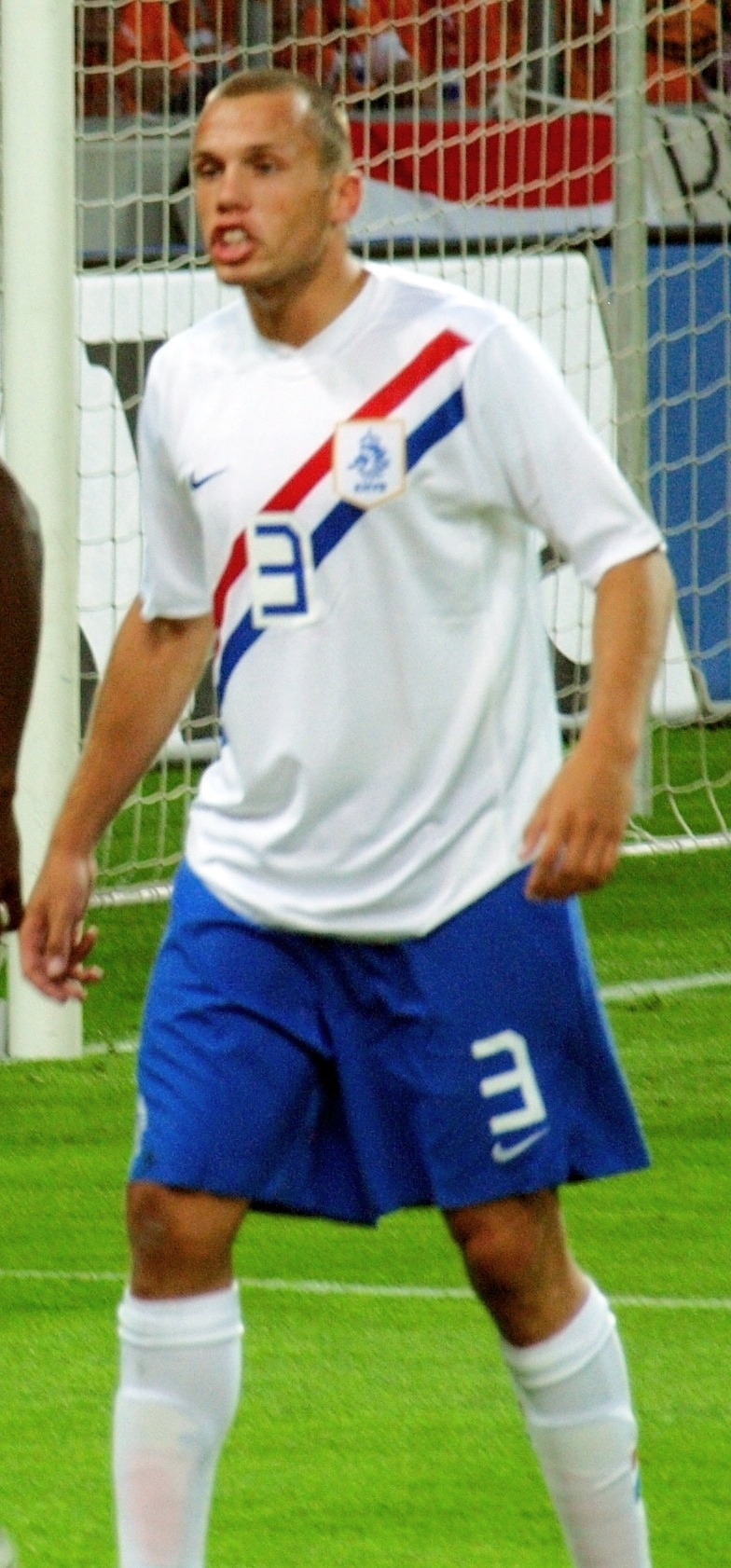
John Heitinga moved from Ajax to Atlético Madrid for €10 million.

This is a list of transfers in Dutch football for the 2008 Summer transfer window. Only moves featuring Eredivisie side professional players are listed.

The summer transfer window opened on July 1, 2008, and closed on September 1. Deals may be signed at any given moment in the season, but the actual transfer may only take place during the transfer window.

== Player transfers ==
=== ADO Den Haag ===
In: Note: Flags indicate national team as defined under FIFA eligibility rules; some limited exceptions apply. Players may hold more than one non-FIFA nationality.

No.	Pos.	Nation	Player
1	GK	NED	Boy Waterman (on loan from AZ Alkmaar)
2	DF	MAR	Ahmed Ammi (from NAC Breda)
3	DF	NED	Csaba Horváth (from FK AS Trenčín)
5	DF	NED	Mitchell Pique (from SC Cambuur)
8	MF	NED	Leroy Resodihardjo (from SVV Scheveningen)
9	FW	BEL	Fabio Caracciolo (from FC Eindhoven)
11	FW	FRA	Karim Soltani (from VVV-Venlo)
12	MF	NED	Ekrem Kahya (from VVV-Venlo)
14	MF	BEL	Tim De Meersman (from FC Eindhoven)
18	FW	MNE	Bogdan Milić (from FK Budućnost Podgorica)
26	GK	NED	Gino Coutinho (from FC Den Bosch)
––	DF	NED	Robin Faber (from Vitesse Arnhem)

Out: Note: Flags indicate national team as defined under FIFA eligibility rules; some limited exceptions apply. Players may hold more than one non-FIFA nationality.

No.	Pos.	Nation	Player
1	GK	NED	Stefan Postma (to De Graafschap)
2	DF	ANT	Daniël Rijaard (to SVV Scheveningen)
16	FW	NED	Hans van de Haar (on loan to AGOVV)
18	DF	NED	Raimund Riedewald (to Haaglandia)
21	FW	NED	Nick Coster (to FC Dordrecht)
29	FW	NED	Geoffrey Knijnenburg (to SVV Scheveningen)
53	DF	NED	Daryl Janmaat (to SC Heerenveen)
––	GK	NED	Richard van Nieuwkoop
––	FW	NED	John Verhoek (to FC Dordrecht)

=== Ajax ===
In: Note: Flags indicate national team as defined under FIFA eligibility rules; some limited exceptions apply. Players may hold more than one non-FIFA nationality.

No.	Pos.	Nation	Player
3	DF	ESP	Oleguer Presas (from FC Barcelona)
10	FW	SRB	Miralem Sulejmani (from SC Heerenveen)
11	MF	NED	Ismaïl Aissati (from PSV Eindhoven)
12	GK	NED	Kenneth Vermeer (loan return from Willem II Tilburg)
20	FW	ARG	Darío Cvitanich (from Club Atlético Banfield)
21	MF	CMR	Eyong Enoh (from Ajax Cape Town)
25	MF	NED	Evander Sno (from Celtic Glasgow)
37	DF	NED	Robbert Schilder (loan return from Heracles Almelo)
––	MF	RSA	Daylon Claasen (from Ajax Cape Town)
––	FW	AUT	Darko Bodul (from SC Heerenveen)

Out: Note: Flags indicate national team as defined under FIFA eligibility rules; some limited exceptions apply. Players may hold more than one non-FIFA nationality.

No.	Pos.	Nation	Player
2	DF	NED	John Heitinga (to Atlético Madrid)
6	DF	GHA	Samuel Kuffour (returns to AS Roma)
8	FW	ESP	Ismael Urzaiz (released)
12	GK	NED	Erik Heijblok (out to De Graafschap)
13	MF	NED	Edgar Davids (released)
17	DF	ROU	George Ogăraru (on loan to FC Steaua București until June 2009)
21	MF	ROU	Nicolae Mitea (to FC Dinamo București)
28	MF	DEN	Michael Krohn-Dehli (to Brøndby IF)
29	FW	DEN	Kenneth Perez (to FC Twente)
25	DF	NED	Jürgen Colin (to Sporting Gijón)
31	FW	ESP	Albert Luque (on loan to Málaga CF until June 2009)
32	DF	NED	Donovan Slijngard (on loan to Sparta Rotterdam until June 2009)
36	DF	NED	Vito Wormgoor (released)
––	GK	NED	Marco van Duin (to HFC Haarlem)
––	GK	NED	Dennis van der Kraan (to Ajax Zaterdag)
––	GK	NED	Koen Verhoeff (to HFC Haarlem)
––	DF	NED	Marijn Sterk (to FC Volendam)
––	FW	NED	Chakib Tayeb (to FC Omniworld)
––	FW	NED	Rydell Poepon (to Sparta Rotterdam)

=== AZ Alkmaar ===
In: Note: Flags indicate national team as defined under FIFA eligibility rules; some limited exceptions apply. Players may hold more than one non-FIFA nationality.

No.	Pos.	Nation	Player
7	FW	NED	Jermain Lens (loan return from NEC Nijmegen)
19	MF	NED	Kees Luyckx (loan return from Excelsior)
23	MF	NED	Nick van der Velden (from FC Dordrecht)
25	DF	FIN	Niklas Moisander (from FC Zwolle)
27	FW	AUS	Brett Holman (from NEC Nijmegen)
28	DF	BEL	Gill Swerts (from Vitesse)

Out: Note: Flags indicate national team as defined under FIFA eligibility rules; some limited exceptions apply. Players may hold more than one non-FIFA nationality.

No.	Pos.	Nation	Player
4	DF	NED	Barry Opdam (to FC Red Bull Salzburg)
10	MF	GER	Simon Cziommer (on loan to FC Utrecht)
14	DF	NED	Ryan Donk (on loan to West Bromwich Albion)
15	MF	NED	Rogier Molhoek (to Vitesse)
17	MF	NED	Kemy Agustien (on loan to Birmingham City F.C.)
21	GK	NED	Boy Waterman (on loan to ADO Den Haag)
22	MF	NED	Haris Međunjanin (to Real Valladolid)
25	MF	NED	Ruud Vormer (to Roda JC)
27	MF	ISL	Aron Gunnarsson (to Coventry City F.C.)
––	MF	ANT	Furdjel Narsingh (on loan to FC Volendam)
––	MF	FIN	Joona Toivio (on loan to SC Telstar)
––	GK	NED	Theo Zwarthoed (to RKC Waalwijk)

=== Feyenoord ===
In: Note: Flags indicate national team as defined under FIFA eligibility rules; some limited exceptions apply. Players may hold more than one non-FIFA nationality.

No.	Pos.	Nation	Player
6	MF	MAR	Karim El Ahmadi (from FC Twente)
11	FW	DEN	Jon Dahl Tomasson (from Villarreal CF)
15	FW	RSA	Kermit Erasmus (from Supersport United)
17	MF	BRA	Manteiga (from Sociedade Esportiva do Gama)
32	GK	NED	Rob van Dijk (from SC Heerenveen)
37	FW	NED	Diego Biseswar (loan return from Heracles Almelo)
––	DF	NED	Michael Jansen (loan return from De Graafschap)
––	DF	BEL	Timothy Derijck (loan return from FCV Dender EH)

Out: Note: Flags indicate national team as defined under FIFA eligibility rules; some limited exceptions apply. Players may hold more than one non-FIFA nationality.

No.	Pos.	Nation	Player
17	MF	TUR	Nuri Şahin (returns to Borussia Dortmund)
23	DF	NED	Jordy Buijs (to De Graafschap)
32	GK	EGY	Sherif Ekramy (on loan to Ankaragücü)
––	DF	NED	Michael Jansen (to sc Cambuur)
––	MF	CHI	Sebastián Pardo (to Universidad de Chile)
––	GK	NED	Erwin Mulder (on loan to Excelsior)
––	DF	GHA	Harrison Afful (on loan to KV Mechelen)
––	DF	NED	Jeffrey Altheer (on loan to Excelsior)
––	MF	NED	Jerson Ribeiro (on loan to FC Dordrecht)
––	FW	KOR	Lee Chun-Soo (on loan to Suwon Samsung Bluewings)
––	MF	NED	Nicky Hofs (on loan to Vitesse Arnhem)
––	FW	NED	Michel Poldervaart (to SC Heerenveen)
––	FW	NED	Hanne Hagary (on loan to Excelsior)
––	MF	CAN	Jacob Lensky (retired)

=== De Graafschap ===
In: Note: Flags indicate national team as defined under FIFA eligibility rules; some limited exceptions apply. Players may hold more than one non-FIFA nationality.

No.	Pos.	Nation	Player
––	GK	NED	Erik Heijblok (from Ajax)
––	GK	NED	Stefan Postma (from ADO Den Haag)
––	MF	MAR	Abdelhali Chaiat (from FC Volendam)
––	MF	NED	Peter Jungschläger (from VVV-Venlo)
––	FW	MAR	Oussama Assaidi (from FC Omniworld)
––	FW	BEL	Steve De Ridder (from AA Gent)
––	FW	NED	Jason Oost (from VVV-Venlo)
––	FW	NED	Geert den Ouden (from SBV Excelsior)
––	FW	FRA	Hugo Bargas (from Atletico All Boys)
––	FW	NED	Mark Bloemendaal (loan return from SC Heerenveen)
––	FW	NED	Jordy Buijs (from Feyenoord)

Out: Note: Flags indicate national team as defined under FIFA eligibility rules; some limited exceptions apply. Players may hold more than one non-FIFA nationality.

No.	Pos.	Nation	Player
1	GK	NED	Jim van Fessem (to NAC Breda)
8	MF	ISL	Arnar Viðarsson (returns to FC Twente)
9	FW	FIN	Niklas Tarvajärvi (returns to SC Heerenveen)
10	MF	DEN	Lasse Schøne (to NEC Nijmegen)
11	FW	CAN	Will Johnson (returns to SC Heerenveen)
12	DF	NED	Michael Jansen (returns to Feyenoord)
26	FW	NED	Diego Biseswar (returns to Feyenoord)
––	DF	NED	Dave Bus (to Go Ahead Eagles)
––	DF	NED	Ard van Peppen (to SBV Excelsior)
––	FW	LAT	Ģirts Karlsons (released)
––	MF	NED	Marcel van der Sloot (on loan to FC Dordrecht)
––	GK	NED	Raymond Lenting (released)
––	FW	NED	Kevin Sissing (to De Treffers)

=== FC Groningen ===
In: Note: Flags indicate national team as defined under FIFA eligibility rules; some limited exceptions apply. Players may hold more than one non-FIFA nationality.

No.	Pos.	Nation	Player
7	DF	SWE	Andreas Granqvist (from Wigan Athletic)
15	MF	NGR	Femi (from FC Midtjylland)
18	MF	ESP	Gonzalo (from Heracles Almelo)
20	MF	SWE	Petter Andersson (from Hammarby IF)
––	MF	NED	Jordi Hoogstrate (from PSV Eindhoven)

Out: Note: Flags indicate national team as defined under FIFA eligibility rules; some limited exceptions apply. Players may hold more than one non-FIFA nationality.

No.	Pos.	Nation	Player
––	DF	NED	Arnold Kruiswijk (to RSC Anderlecht)
––	MF	NED	Mark-Jan Fledderus (to Heracles Almelo)
––	FW	NED	Marnix Kolder (to VVV-Venlo)
––	DF	NED	Martijn van der Laan (to BV Veendam)
––	MF	NED	Sander Rozema (to BV Veendam)
––	FW	NED	Stefan Nijland (to PSV Eindhoven)
––	MF	NED	Anco Jansen (returns to FC Zwolle)
––	FW	CAN	Marcus Haber (released)
––	DF	NED	Koert Thalen (to AGOVV Apeldoorn)
––	FW	NED	Rogier Krohne (to FC Emmen)
––	FW	SVK	Tim Matavž (on loan to FC Emmen)

=== SC Heerenveen ===
In: Note: Flags indicate national team as defined under FIFA eligibility rules; some limited exceptions apply. Players may hold more than one non-FIFA nationality.

No.	Pos.	Nation	Player
1	GK	BEL	Kenny Steppe (from Germinal Beerschot)
2	DF	CZE	Milan Kopic (from FK Mladá Boleslav)
7	MF	FIN	Mika Väyrynen (from PSV Eindhoven)
13	FW	NOR	Tarik Elyounoussi (from Fredrikstad FK)
18	FW	BRA	Pedro Beda (from CR Flamengo)
19	DF	NED	Daryl Janmaat (from ADO Den Haag)
20	DF	MKD	Goran Popov (from Levadiakos F.C.)
21	FW	CIV	Bonaventure Kalou (from Al-Jazira Club)
23	DF	BRA	Lazaro (from Clube Atlético Mineiro)
30	MF	IRI	Reza Ghoochannejhad (loan return from Go Ahead Eagles)
40	DF	HAI	Lesly Fellinga (from BV Veendam)
––	FW	NED	Michel Poldervaart (from Feyenoord)

Out: Note: Flags indicate national team as defined under FIFA eligibility rules; some limited exceptions apply. Players may hold more than one non-FIFA nationality.

No.	Pos.	Nation	Player
––	DF	NED	Jeroen Drost (on loan to Vitesse Arnhem)
––	DF	DEN	Timmi Johansen (on loan to Odense BK)
––	DF	CPV	Cecilio Lopes (on loan to FC Volendam)
––	FW	FIN	Niklas Tarvajärvi (on loan to Vitesse Arnhem)
––	MF	NED	Oguzhan Türk (on loan to Go Ahead Eagles)
2	DF	NED	Gianni Zuiverloon (to West Bromwich Albion)
6	MF	USA	Michael Bradley (to Borussia Mönchengladbach)
7	MF	DEN	Jakob Poulsen (to AGF Aarhus)
14	MF	AUT	Thomas Prager (to LASK Linz)
21	FW	SRB	Miralem Sulejmani (to Ajax)
24	GK	NED	Rob van Dijk (to Feyenoord)
26	GK	NED	Harmen Kuperus (returns to FC Zwolle)
34	DF	POL	Maciej Wilusz (to Sparta Rotterdam)
37	FW	NED	Mark Bloemendaal (returns to De Graafschap)
38	DF	NED	Pim Balkestein (to Ipswich Town F.C.)
39	DF	SWE	Tom Siwe (released)
40	FW	NED	Rawley Rozendaal (SV Argon)
––	DF	NED	Sebastiaan Steur (to Heracles Almelo)
––	MF	NED	Niek Loohuis (to BV Veendam)
––	FW	CRO	Darko Bodul (to Ajax)
––	MF	URU	Gonzalo García García (to FC Groningen)
––	DF	NED	Robbert Maruanaya (to Go Ahead Eagles)
––	FW	CAN	Will Johnson (released)
––	FW	POL	Radosław Matusiak (released)

=== Heracles Almelo ===
In: Note: Flags indicate national team as defined under FIFA eligibility rules; some limited exceptions apply. Players may hold more than one non-FIFA nationality.

No.	Pos.	Nation	Player
3	DF	BEL	Birger Maertens (from Club Brugge)
6	MF	CZE	Lukáš Bajer (on loan from SK Sigma Olomouc)
8	MF	NED	Mark-Jan Fledderus (from FC Groningen)
9	FW	CZE	Vojtěch Schulmeister (from SK Sigma Olomouc)
12	FW	NED	Bas Dost (from FC Emmen)
16	GK	NED	Jörg van Nieuwenhuijzen (from SBV Excelsior)
20	FW	NED	Sebastiaan Steur (unattached)
21	FW	SUR	Darl Douglas (unattached)
23	FW	NED	Willie Overtoom (from HVV Hollandia)
24	DF	NED	Denis Mangafic (from Eintracht Frankfurt)
––	MF	NED	Qays Shayesteh (from FC Twente)
––	GK	NED	Dennis Telgenkamp (from FC Twente)

Out: Note: Flags indicate national team as defined under FIFA eligibility rules; some limited exceptions apply. Players may hold more than one non-FIFA nationality.

No.	Pos.	Nation	Player
3	DF	BFA	Rahim Ouedraogo (released)
6	MF	NED	Rob Maas (released)
8	FW	CRO	Srđan Lakić (returns to Hertha BSC)
9	FW	MNE	Igor Gluščević (on loan from Vitesse Arnhem)
19	MF	ESP	Gonzalo García García (returns to SC Heerenveen)
20	MF	GER	Kai Michalke (released)
21	DF	BEL	Björn Daelemans (released)
22	MF	NED	Robbert Schilder (returns to AFC Ajax)
25	MF	DEN	Martin Christensen (return to Charlton Athletic)
––	GK	NED	Remko Pasveer (on loan to Go Ahead Eagles)
––	FW	NED	Marc Höcher (to Helmond Sport)

=== NAC Breda ===
In: Note: Flags indicate national team as defined under FIFA eligibility rules; some limited exceptions apply. Players may hold more than one non-FIFA nationality.

No.	Pos.	Nation	Player
5	DF	NED	Kees Kwakman (from RBC Roosendaal)
8	MF	NED	Tommie van der Leegte (from PSV Eindhoven)
15	MF	NED	Martijn Reuser (from RKC Waalwijk)
16	GK	NED	Jim van Fessem (from De Graafschap)
17	FW	AUT	Rafael Pollack (from SV Wurmla)
18	MF	NED	Donny Gorter (from PSV Eindhoven)
20	FW	NED	Ellery Cairo (from Coventry City)
22	DF	ESP	Enric Valles Prat (from FC Barcelona B)

Out: Note: Flags indicate national team as defined under FIFA eligibility rules; some limited exceptions apply. Players may hold more than one non-FIFA nationality.

No.	Pos.	Nation	Player
1	GK	NED	Edwin Zoetebier (retired)
5	MF	NED	Sander van Gessel (to Sparta Rotterdam)
8	MF	NED	Rogier Molhoek (returns to AZ)
12	FW	NED	Victor Sikora (released)
15	FW	NED	Rogier Veenstra (on loan to Excelsior)
17	FW	NED	Andro Franca (to Kozakken Boys)
18	MF	NED	Benjamin van den Broek (to HFC Haarlem)
21	GK	NED	Bas van Wegen (to HFC Haarlem)
22	DF	MAR	Ahmed Ammi (to ADO Den Haag)
23	MF	NED	Ron Stam (to FC Twente)

=== NEC Nijmegen ===
In: Note: Flags indicate national team as defined under FIFA eligibility rules; some limited exceptions apply. Players may hold more than one non-FIFA nationality.

No.	Pos.	Nation	Player
2	DF	NED	Ramon Zomer (on loan from Twente)
10	MF	DEN	Lasse Schöne (from De Graafschap)
14	FW	NED	Rachid Bouaouzan (on loan from Wigan)
17	FW	NED	Collins John (on loan from Fulham)
23	MF	POL	Arek Radomski (from FK Austria Wien)

Out: Note: Flags indicate national team as defined under FIFA eligibility rules; some limited exceptions apply. Players may hold more than one non-FIFA nationality.

No.	Pos.	Nation	Player
2	DF	SWE	Jonas Olsson (to West Bromwich Albion)
10	FW	AUS	Brett Holman (to AZ Alkmaar)
11	FW	NED	Kevin Bobson (returns to Willem II)
14	DF	NED	Muslu Nalbantoğlu (to Kayserispor)
17	FW	NED	Jeremain Lens (returns to AZ)
20	FW	NED	Karim Fachtali (on loan to TOP Oss)
21	DF	NED	Jeroen Drost (returns to SC Heerenveen)
22	MF	NED	Bart van Brakel (to FC Eindhoven)
23	MF	HUN	Krisztián Vadócz (to CA Osasuna)
24	DF	BEL	Naïm Aarab (to AE Larissa)

=== PSV Eindhoven ===
In: Note: Flags indicate national team as defined under FIFA eligibility rules; some limited exceptions apply. Players may hold more than one non-FIFA nationality.

No.	Pos.	Nation	Player
1	GK	SWE	Andreas Isaksson (from Manchester City)
4	DF	MEX	Francisco Rodríguez (from Guadalajara)
11	FW	NED	Nordin Amrabat (from VVV-Venlo)
13	DF	FRA	Jérémie Bréchet (from FC Sochaux)
14	DF	NED	Erik Pieters (from FC Utrecht)
16	FW	NED	Stefan Nijland (from FC Groningen)
17	MF	PER	Reimond Manco (from Alianza Lima)
––	FW	BEL	Arne Nilis (from Racing Genk)

Out: Note: Flags indicate national team as defined under FIFA eligibility rules; some limited exceptions apply. Players may hold more than one non-FIFA nationality.

No.	Pos.	Nation	Player
1	GK	BRA	Gomes (to Tottenham Hotspur)
14	DF	SRB	Slobodan Rajković (returns to Chelsea F.C.)
16	MF	NED	Ismail Aissati (to AFC Ajax)
17	FW	PER	Jefferson Farfán (to Schalke 04)
23	DF	BRA	Alcides (returns to Chelsea F.C.)
25	MF	NED	John de Jong (retired)
26	MF	NED	Tommy van der Leegte (to NAC Breda)
27	FW	NED	Género Zeefuik (on loan to FC Omniworld)
30	MF	FIN	Mika Väyrynen (to sc Heerenveen)
34	DF	NED	Rens van Eijden (on loan to Willem II)
41	GK	BEL	Ruud Boffin (to MVV Maastricht)
––	GK	NED	Gino Mommers (to K.V.S.K. United Overpelt-Lommel)
––	DF	BRA	Fagner (released)
––	MF	NED	Rob van Boekel (to FC Eindhoven)
––	MF	NED	Rochdi Achenteh (to FC Eindhoven)
––	FW	NED	Jelle Schijvenaars (to K.V.S.K. United Overpelt-Lommel)
––	FW	NED	Paul Voss (to RFC Liege)
––	DF	NED	Jelle De Bock (on loan to Helmond Sport)
––	MF	NED	Jordi Hoogstrate (to FC Groningen)
––	MF	NED	Giel Neervoort (to HFC Haarlem)
––	MF	ARG	Juan Carlos Carrizo (released)
––	DF	ESP	Pepe Pla (released)

=== Roda JC ===
In: Note: Flags indicate national team as defined under FIFA eligibility rules; some limited exceptions apply. Players may hold more than one non-FIFA nationality.

No.	Pos.	Nation	Player
7	MF	NED	Edwin Linssen (from VVV-Venlo)
14	FW	NED	Harrie Gommans (from Vitesse Arnhem)
23	DF	BEL	Mark De Man (from RSC Anderlecht)
25	MF	NED	Ruud Vormer (from AZ Alkmaar)
--	MF	BIH	Adnan Secerović (from Slaven Živinice)

Out: Note: Flags indicate national team as defined under FIFA eligibility rules; some limited exceptions apply. Players may hold more than one non-FIFA nationality.

No.	Pos.	Nation	Player
2	DF	NED	Ger Senden (retired)
14	DF	NED	Frank van Kouwen (to VVV-Venlo)
15	DF	ANT	Nuelson Wau (to Nea Salamis FC)
18	MF	CIV	Cheick Tioté (returns to Anderlecht)
20	MF	BEL	Roland Lamah (returns to Anderlecht)
23	FW	NED	Roy Bejas (to Groene Ster)
24	DF	TUR	Fatih Sonkaya (returns to F.C. Porto)
--	MF	BIH	Adnan Secerović (on loan to Slaven Živinice)

=== Sparta Rotterdam ===
In: Note: Flags indicate national team as defined under FIFA eligibility rules; some limited exceptions apply. Players may hold more than one non-FIFA nationality.

No.	Pos.	Nation	Player
2	DF	HUN	Krisztián Vermes (from Újpest FC)
4	MF	NED	Sander van Gessel (from NAC Breda)
5	DF	NED	Ruud Knol (from PAOK)
8	DF	NED	Donovan Slijngard (on loan from Ajax)
9	FW	NED	Rydell Poepon (from Ajax)
16	DF	MAR	Karim Touzani (from Aberdeen F.C.)
26	MF	BEL	Floribert N'Galula (from Randers FC)
35	DF	POL	Maciej Wilusz (from SC Heerenveen)
––	FW	NED	Shayron Curiël (from Spartaan '20)

Out: Note: Flags indicate national team as defined under FIFA eligibility rules; some limited exceptions apply. Players may hold more than one non-FIFA nationality.

No.	Pos.	Nation	Player
4	DF	NED	Danny Schenkel (to Willem II)
5	DF	NED	Sjaak Polak (to BV Veendam)
8	MF	MAR	Nourdin Boukhari (to Al-Ittihad)
11	MF	NED	Olaf Lindenbergh (released)
16	MF	NGR	Sani Kaita (to AS Monaco)
18	FW	NED	Marvin Emnes (to Middlesbrough F.C.)
19	FW	TTO	Darryl Roberts (to Denizlispor)
25	GK	NED	Sander Westerveld (released)
26	DF	NED	Dwight Tiendalli (returns to Feyenoord)
––	FW	NED	Jeffrey Vlug (on loan to Go Ahead Eagles)
––	GK	NED	Dolf Kerklaan (to FC Zwolle)

=== FC Twente ===
In: Note: Flags indicate national team as defined under FIFA eligibility rules; some limited exceptions apply. Players may hold more than one non-FIFA nationality.

No.	Pos.	Nation	Player
5	DF	SRB	Slobodan Rajković (on loan from Chelsea)
8	DF	NED	Ron Stam (from NAC Breda)
10	MF	DEN	Kenneth Perez (from AFC Ajax)
18	MF	CIV	Cheick Tioté (from RSC Anderlecht)
24	MF	NED	Theo Janssen (from Vitesse Arnhem)
26	MF	ISL	Bjarni Viðarsson (from Everton)

Out: Note: Flags indicate national team as defined under FIFA eligibility rules; some limited exceptions apply. Players may hold more than one non-FIFA nationality.

No.	Pos.	Nation	Player
4	DF	NED	Ramon Zomer (on loan to NEC Nijmegen)
5	MF	NED	Alfred Schreuder (to Vitesse Arnhem)
10	MF	NED	Orlando Engelaar (to FC Schalke 04)
14	MF	AUS	Luke Wilkshire (to FC Dynamo Moscow)
24	MF	MAR	Karim El Ahmadi (to Feyenoord)
26	MF	AFG	Qhays Shayesteh (released)
––	FW	NED	Halil Colak (on loan to Go Ahead Eagles)
––	FW	NED	Marcel Kleizen (to FC Zwolle)
––	MF	ISL	Arnar Viðarsson (to Cercle Brugge)
––	DF	NED	Wout Droste (on loan to Go Ahead Eagles)

=== FC Utrecht ===
In: Note: Flags indicate national team as defined under FIFA eligibility rules; some limited exceptions apply. Players may hold more than one non-FIFA nationality.

No.	Pos.	Nation	Player
3	DF	ROU	Mihai Neşu (from Steaua București)
8	MF	DEN	Michael Silberbauer (from F.C. Copenhagen)
9	FW	DEN	Morten Skoubo (from Real Sociedad)
14	MF	GER	Simon Cziommer (on loan from AZ Alkmaar)
18	MF	NED	Barry Maguire (from FC Den Bosch)
19	FW	MAR	Ali Boussaboun (from Al Wakra)
25	DF	NED	Vito Wormgoor (unattached)
––	MF	BEL	Ken van Mierlo (from Willem II)

Out: Note: Flags indicate national team as defined under FIFA eligibility rules; some limited exceptions apply. Players may hold more than one non-FIFA nationality.

No.	Pos.	Nation	Player
3	DF	NED	Erik Pieters (to PSV Eindhoven)
9	FW	ANT	Robin Nelisse (to FC Red Bull Salzburg)
12	MF	ROU	Lucian Sânmartean (released)
14	FW	FIN	Peter Kopteff (to Aalesunds FK)
16	GK	GLP	Franck Grandel (released)
19	FW	BEL	Giuseppe Rossini (to K.V. Mechelen)
21	MF	NED	Rick Kruys (to Malmö FF)
30	MF	NED	Jasper Bolland (to IJsselmeervogels)
32	DF	NED	Jahri Valentijn (on loan to AGOVV Apeldoorn)
38	FW	NED	Ramon Leeuwin (on loan to AGOVV Apeldoorn)
––	FW	BEL	Kevin Vandenbergh (on loan to Germinal Beerschot Antwerpen)
––	FW	NED	Nassir Maachi (to SC Cambuur)

=== Vitesse Arnhem ===
In: Note: Flags indicate national team as defined under FIFA eligibility rules; some limited exceptions apply. Players may hold more than one non-FIFA nationality.

No.	Pos.	Nation	Player
5	DF	NED	Jeroen Drost (on loan from SC Heerenveen)
7	MF	BRA	Claudemir (from Sao Carlos)
8	MF	NED	Rogier Molhoek (on loan from AZ Alkmaar)
14	MF	NED	Julian Jenner (on loan from AZ Alkmaar)
16	MF	NED	Alfred Schreuder (from SDV Barneveld)
19	FW	FIN	Niklas Tarvajarvi (on loan from SC Heerenveen)
21	GK	NED	Ronald Graafland (from Excelsior Rotterdam)
30	MF	NED	Nicky Hofs (on loan from Feyenoord)

Out: Note: Flags indicate national team as defined under FIFA eligibility rules; some limited exceptions apply. Players may hold more than one non-FIFA nationality.

No.	Pos.	Nation	Player
6	MF	NED	Remco van der Schaaf (to Burnley)
9	FW	NED	Harrie Gommans (to Roda JC)
11	FW	CHI	Juan Gonzalo Lorca (returns to Colo-Colo)
14	MF	NED	Theo Janssen (to FC Twente)
16	MF	NED	Jasar Takak (released)
22	GK	HUN	Balázs Rabóczki (to Budapest Honvéd)
27	DF	NED	Robin Faber (to ADO Den Haag)
28	DF	BEL	Gill Swerts (to AZ Alkmaar)
29	FW	NED	Rihairo Meulens (on loan to FC Dordrecht)
33	GK	NED	Stephan Veenboer (to AFC)
68	FW	CHN	Yu Hai (released)
––	DF	BEL	Siebe Blondelle (to FCV Dender EH)
––	DF	NED	Jaime Bruinier (on loan to AGOVV)
––	DF	SUR	Purrel Fränkel (to De Graafschap)

=== FC Volendam ===
In: Note: Flags indicate national team as defined under FIFA eligibility rules; some limited exceptions apply. Players may hold more than one non-FIFA nationality.

No.	Pos.	Nation	Player
––	DF	NED	Tim Bakens (from RKC Waalwijk)
––	FW	NED	Dominique van Dijk (on loan from Go Ahead Eagles)
––	FW	NED	Adil Harfaoui (from Quick Boys)
––	DF	NED	Gerry Koning (from RBC Roosendaal)
––	GK	NED	Harmen Kuperus (from SC Heerenveen)
––	MF	NED	Paul de Lange (from Veria F.C.)
––	FW	CPV	Cecilio Lopes (on loan from SC Heerenveen)
––	MF	ANT	Furdjel Narsingh (on loan from AZ Alkmaar)
––	MF	NED	Arvid Smit (from U.D. Leiria)
––	DF	NED	Marijn Sterk (from Ajax)

Out: Note: Flags indicate national team as defined under FIFA eligibility rules; some limited exceptions apply. Players may hold more than one non-FIFA nationality.

No.	Pos.	Nation	Player
––	FW	NED	Abdelhali Chaiat (to De Graafschap)
––	MF	ANT	Boy Deul (to Willem II)
––	MF	NED	Luciano Dompig (to BV Veendam)
––	FW	NED	Michiel Hemmen (to BV Veendam)
––	GK	ANT	Raymond Homoet (to Zwaluwen '30)
––	MF	NED	Niels Joren (to Zwaluwen '30)
––	DF	NED	Henk Kluessien (to RKAV Volendam)
––	FW	RUS	Yuri Petrov (to ASWH)
––	FW	NED	Johan Plat (to FC Zwolle)
––	FW	NED	Robert Plat (to FC Zwolle)
––	MF	NED	Paul Quasten (to Willem II)
––	FW	NED	Harry Zwarthoed (to Zwaluwen '30)

=== Willem II Tilburg ===
In: Note: Flags indicate national team as defined under FIFA eligibility rules; some limited exceptions apply. Players may hold more than one non-FIFA nationality.

No.	Pos.	Nation	Player
3	DF	NED	Danny Schenkel (from Sparta Rotterdam)
7	MF	ANT	Boy Deul (from Willem II)
15	DF	NED	Rens van Eijden (on loan from PSV)
16	GK	NED	Oscar Moens (unattached)
17	FW	NED	Sergio Zijler (from FC Twente)
18	MF	NED	Paul Quasten (from Willem II)
19	FW	NED	Ibad Muhamadu (from FC Dordrecht)
––	MF	POL	Wojciech Luczak (from Concordia Piotrków Trybunalski)
––	GK	NED	Ariën Pietersma (from RBC Roosendaal)
––	DF	NED	Danny van der Ree (from AS Trenčín)

Out: Note: Flags indicate national team as defined under FIFA eligibility rules; some limited exceptions apply. Players may hold more than one non-FIFA nationality.

No.	Pos.	Nation	Player
3	DF	DEN	Thomas Bælum (released)
4	DF	NED	Frank van der Struijk (to Vitesse Arnhem)
5	DF	ECU	José Valencia (on loan to FC Eindhoven)
7	FW	NED	Darl Douglas (to Heracles Almelo)
16	GK	NED	Kenneth Vermeer (returns to Ajax)
19	FW	NED	Rydell Poepon (returns to Ajax)
21	MF	BEL	Ken van Mierlo (to FC Utrecht)
26	GK	BEL	Björn Sengier (released)
29	FW	BRA	Cristiano (released)
30	DF	NED	Delano Hill (to Al-Wakrah Sports Club)
––	FW	NED	Kevin Bobson (released)

== Manager transfers ==
Name	Moving from	Moving to	Source
(Netherlands) Frans Adelaar	Unaffiliated	FC Volendam	
(Netherlands) Marco van Basten	Netherlands	Ajax	
(Netherlands) Ruud Brood	Unaffiliated	RKC Waalwijk	
(Belgium) Fuat Çapa	Unaffiliated	MVV	
(Netherlands) Robert Maaskant	MVV	NAC Breda	
(Netherlands) Bert van Marwijk	Feyenoord	Netherlands	
(England) Steve McClaren	Unaffiliated	FC Twente	
(Netherlands) Edward Metgod	AZ	Telstar	
(Netherlands) Jan Poortvliet	Helmond Sport	(England) Southampton	
(Netherlands) Fred Rutten	FC Twente	(Germany) Schalke 04	
(Norway) Trond Sollied	(Belgium) A.A. Gent	SC Heerenveen	
(Netherlands) Huub Stevens	(Germany) Hamburger SV	PSV	
(Netherlands) Gertjan Verbeek	SC Heerenveen	Feyenoord	
(Netherlands) André Wetzel	VVV-Venlo	ADO Den Haag	
(Netherlands) Hans Westerhof	Unaffiliated	Vitesse Arnhem	

== See also ==
- Football in the Netherlands
- List of English football transfers Summer 2008
- List of Belgian football transfers Summer 2008
- List of Spanish football transfers Summer 2008
- Transfer window
