= 2006–07 KNVB Cup =

Tournament details
- Country: Netherlands
- Teams: 88

Final positions
- Champions: Ajax
- Runners-up: AZ

Tournament statistics
- Top goal scorer(s): Maarten Martens; Yuri Rose (5 goals)

The 2006–07 KNVB Cup was the 89th edition of the Dutch national football annual knockout tournament for the KNVB Cup. 88 teams contested, beginning on 26 August 2006 and ending at the final on 6 May 2007 at the Feyenoord Stadion in Rotterdam.

Ajax and 3-time winners AZ finished 1–1 after regular time and after extra time. Ajax went on to win 8–7 on penalties and received the cup for the seventeenth time.

== Teams ==
- All 18 participants from the Eredivisie 2006-07
- All 20 participants from the Eerste Divisie 2006-07
- Two youth teams
- 48 teams from lower (amateur) leagues, only these teams entered in the first round

== First round ==
Only amateur clubs from the hoofdklasse and below participated in this round.

August 26, 2006
FC Zutphen	0–4	Achilles '29
De Treffers	3–2	VV Katwijk
Türkiyemspor	5–1	SV Spakenburg
DOTO	1–0	GVVV
IJsselmeervogels	3–0	JVC 31
WHC	2–0	VV Gemert
Alkmaarsche Boys	0–1	Flevo Boys
Excelsior 31	3–1	VV Geldrop
O.N.S. Sneek	4–0	VV Appingedam
Harkemase Boys	0–4	SV Argon
VV Bennekom	1–0	ADO 20
Sparta Nijkerk	2–1	USV Elinkwijk
Caesar	0–0 (p: 8-9)	VVOG
UDI 19	0–1	SC Genemuiden
RKSV Schijndel	2–0	ACV
Oisterwijk	0–2	HHC Hardenberg
Kozakken Boys	3–0	Roda Boys
SV Meerssen	1–1 (p: 7-6)	Quick Boys
FC Lisse	2–2 (p: 3-5)	EVV
TONEGIDO	0–5	Be Quick '28
ASWH	5–1	WSV
HSC 21	3–0	VV Spijkenisse
Ter Leede	4–2	FC Omniworld (amateurs)
Babberich	1–1 (p: 4-5)	Rjinsburgse Boys

== Second round ==
The professional clubs from the Eredivisie and Eerste Divisie and the two youth teams entered the tournament this round.

September 19, 20 and 21 2006
Achilles '29 _{A}	0–0 (p: 4-3)	FC Volendam _{1}
Flevo Boys _{A}	0–2	Willem II _{E}
Sparta Nijkerk _{A}	1–6	HFC Haarlem _{1}
FC Emmen _{1}	1–0	FC Zwolle _{1}
RBC Roosendaal _{1}	3–1	Helmond Sport _{1}
Excelsior '31 _{A}	0–1	Go Ahead Eagles _{1}
HSC '21 _{A}	3–4	FC Den Bosch _{1}
ASWH _{A}	4–2 (aet)	Cambuur Leeuwarden _{1}
SC Genemuiden _{A}	3–2 (aet)	FC Omniworld _{1}
Ter Leede _{A}	1–2 (aet)	Stormvogels Telstar _{1}
FC Utrecht _{E}	1–0	AGOVV Apeldoorn _{1}
Rijnsburgse Boys _{A}	1–0	Fortuna Sittard _{1}
FC Eindhoven _{1}	3–2 (aet)	Heracles Almelo _{E}
IJsselmeervogels _{A}	2–4	NAC Breda _{E}
De Graafschap _{1}	3–1	VVV-Venlo _{1}
HHC Hardenberg _{A}	1–4	MVV _{1}
SV Argon _{A}	1–3	Vitesse Arnhem _{E}
Kozakken Boys _{A}	0–2	PSV _{E}
FC Groningen _{E}	2–1	TOP Oss _{1}
DOTO _{A}	1–7	FC Twente _{E}
Türkiyemspor _{A}	1–6	ADO Den Haag _{E}
Be Quick '28 _{A}	4–1	VVOG _{A}
ONS Sneek _{A}	0–2	Young AZ
Young RKC Waalwijk	2–5	Ajax _{E}
EVV_{A}	0–2	NEC _{E}
De Treffers _{A}	2–6	Sparta _{E}
SV Meerssen _{A}	6–3 (aet)	WHC _{A}
sc Heerenveen _{E}	0–2	Roda JC _{E}
BV Veendam _{1}	2–3	Feyenoord _{E}
RKSV Schijndel _{A}	0–1 (aet)	Excelsior _{E}
RKC Waalwijk _{E}	3–2	FC Dordrecht _{1}
VV Bennekom _{A}	0–10	AZ _{E}

_{E} Eredivisie; _{1} Eerste Divisie; _{A} Amateur teams

== Third round ==
November 7, 8, 9 2006
FC Groningen	1–3	NAC Breda
RBC	4–0	FC Eindhoven
MVV	3–1	Stormvogels Telstar
Be Quick '28	2–5	Willem II
Go Ahead Eagles	2–0	Excelsior
De Graafschap	1–0	FC Emmen
AZ	10–1	SV Meerssen
Roda JC	5–0	ASWH
FC Twente	3–1	NEC
Achilles '29	0–5	Sparta
RKC Waalwijk	3–2 (aet)	Feyenoord
HFC Haarlem	1–0	FC Den Bosch
FC Utrecht	5–0	Rijnsburgse Boys
Young AZ	8–1	SC Genemuiden
Ajax	2–0	ADO Den Haag
Vitesse Arnhem	0–4	PSV

== From round of 16 to final ==
Round of 16
23 January
Willem II	4
De Graafschap	2
24 January
Ajax	4
HFC Haarlem	0
24 January
Sparta	2 (2)
RKC Waalwijk	2 (3)
25 January
Roda JC	2
Young AZ	1
24 January
FC Utrecht	1
RBC Roosendaal	0
23 January
AZ	5
MVV	0
24 January
FC Twente	1
NAC Breda	2
25 January
PSV	3
Go Ahead Eagles	2

Quarter-finals
28 February
Willem II	0
Ajax	2
28 February
RKC Waalwijk	1
Roda JC	0
28 February
FC Utrecht	1
AZ	2
28 February
NAC Breda	3
PSV	0

Semi-finals
18 April
Ajax	3
RKC Waalwijk	1
19 April
AZ	6
NAC Breda	0

Final
Main article: 2007 KNVB Cup Final 6 May – Rotterdam
Ajax	1(p)
AZ	1

== Final ==
6 May 2007
18:00 CEST

AZ	1–1 (a.e.t.)	Ajax
Dembélé 4'	Report	Huntelaar 50'
Penalties
Arveladze (penalty scored); Boukhari (penalty scored); Steinsson (penalty scored); De Cler (penalty scored); Jenner (penalty scored); Dembélé (penalty scored); Molhoek (penalty scored); Donk (penalty missed)	7–8	(penalty scored) Perez; (penalty scored) Huntelaar; (penalty scored) Vermaelen; (penalty scored) Lindenbergh; (penalty scored) Heitinga; (penalty scored) De Mul; (penalty scored) Ogăraru; (penalty scored) Davids

De Kuip, Rotterdam
Attendance: 42,000
Referee: Dick van Egmond

Ajax and AZ already secured a spot in the Champions League play-offs of the national competition, with a place in the UEFA Cup being the minimal prize. Therefore, the UEFA Cup ticket the winner of this tournament would win, could now be won in the Eredivisie play-offs.
