= 2007 KNVB Cup final =

- Event: 2006–07 KNVB Cup
AZ	Ajax
1	1
- After extra time Ajax won 8–7 on penalties
- Date: 6 May 2007
- Venue: De Kuip, Rotterdam
- Referee: Dick van Egmond
- Attendance: 42,000

The 2007 KNVB Cup final was a football match between AZ and Ajax on 6 May 2007 at De Kuip, Rotterdam. It was the final match of the 2006–07 KNVB Cup competition. Ajax beat AZ on penalties after the match finished 1–1 after extra time. It was Ajax' 17th KNVB Cup title.

== Route to the final ==
AZ		Round	Ajax	
Opponent	Result		Opponent	Result
VV Bennekom	10–0 (A)	Second round	Jong RKC Waalwijk	5–2 (A)
SV Meerssen	10–1 (H)	Third round	ADO Den Haag	2–0 (H)
MVV	5–0 (H)	Round of 16	HFC Haarlem	4–0 (H)
FC Utrecht	2–1 (A)	Quarter-finals	Willem II	2–0 (A)
NAC Breda	6–0 (H)	Semi-finals	RKC Waalwijk	3–1 (H)

== Match ==
=== Details ===
6 May 2007
18:00 CEST

AZ	1–1 (a.e.t.)	Ajax
Dembélé 4'	Report	Huntelaar 50'
Penalties
Arveladze (penalty scored); Boukhari (penalty scored); Steinsson (penalty scored); De Cler (penalty scored); Jenner (penalty scored); Dembélé (penalty scored); Molhoek (penalty scored); Donk (penalty missed)	7–8	(penalty scored) Perez; (penalty scored) Huntelaar; (penalty scored) Vermaelen; (penalty scored) Lindenbergh; (penalty scored) Heitinga; (penalty scored) De Mul; (penalty scored) Ogăraru; (penalty scored) Davids

De Kuip, Rotterdam
Attendance: 42,000
Referee: Dick van Egmond

AZ	Ajax

GK	22	(Morocco) Khalid Sinouh
RB	23	(Iceland) Grétar Steinsson
CB	2	(Netherlands) Kew Jaliens
CB	14	(Netherlands) Ryan Donk
LB	5	(Netherlands) Tim de Cler
RM	27	(Netherlands) Julian Jenner
CM	10	(Germany) Simon Cziommer	(substituted off) 71'
CM	20	(Netherlands) Demy de Zeeuw	(substituted off) 102'
LM	11	(Belgium) Maarten Martens	(substituted off) 64'
CF	9	(Georgia (country)) Shota Arveladze (c)
CF	18	(Belgium) Mousa Dembélé
Substitutes:
GK	26	(Netherlands) Job Bulters
DF	3	(Netherlands) Gijs Luirink
MF	7	(Morocco) Nourdin Boukhari	(substituted on) 64'
MF	15	(Netherlands) Rogier Molhoek	(substituted on) 102'
MF	25	(Netherlands) Ruud Vormer
FW	19	(Netherlands) Danny Koevermans	(substituted on) 71'
FW	29	(Netherlands) Jeremain Lens
Manager:
(Netherlands) Louis van Gaal

GK	1	(Netherlands) Maarten Stekelenburg
RB	20	(Romania) George Ogăraru
CB	3	(Netherlands) Jaap Stam (c)
CB	4	(Belgium) Thomas Vermaelen
LB	5	(Netherlands) Urby Emanuelson		(substituted off) 76'
DM	2	(Netherlands) John Heitinga
CM	18	(Spain) Gabri	(red card) 90'
CM	10	(Netherlands) Wesley Sneijder	(yellow card) 69'	(substituted off) 87'
CM	13	(Netherlands) Edgar Davids
CF	9	(Netherlands) Klaas-Jan Huntelaar	(yellow card) 70'
CF	8	(Netherlands) Ryan Babel		(substituted off) 119'
Substitutes:
GK	30	(Netherlands) Dennis Gentenaar
DF	35	(Netherlands) Gregory van der Wiel
MF	14	(Spain) Roger
MF	15	(Netherlands) Olaf Lindenbergh		(substituted on) 119'
FW	11	(Denmark) Kenneth Perez		(substituted on) 87'
FW	16	(Belgium) Tom De Mul		(substituted on) 76'
FW	21	(Romania) Nicolae Mitea
Manager:
(Netherlands) Henk ten Cate

Match rules

- 90 minutes.
- 30 minutes of extra-time if necessary.
- Penalty shoot-out if scores still level.
- Maximum of three substitutions.
