= Maarten de Jong =

Dutch footballer (born 1962)

Personal information
- Date of birth: 26 March 1962 (age 64)
- Place of birth: Arnhem, Netherlands
- Position: Midfielder

Senior career*
Years	Team	Apps	(Gls)
1984–1994	Heerenveen	292	(21)
1994–1996	Groningen	35	(2)
Total		327	(23)

Managerial career
- 2007–2008: VV Jubbega
- 2008–2009: SV Donkerbroek
- 2011–2012: Heerenveen Women
- 2017: VV Wispolia
- 2017–2018: VV Lemmer
- * Club domestic league appearances and goals

Maarten de Jong (born 26 March 1962) is a Dutch football coach and former professional footballer who played as a midfielder. He notably spent ten years at Heerenveen, amassing 308 appearances and scoring 23 goals, earning him the affectionate nickname Mister It Hearrenfean ("Mister Heerenveen") from fans.

== Playing career ==
In 1984, De Jong made his debut for Heerenveen's first team under the guidance of head coach Henk van Brussel. He remained with the club until 1995, leaving an indelible mark by becoming the first player to score a goal for Heerenveen in the Eredivisie, leveling the score 1–1 against Volendam. De Jong also played a pivotal role in Heerenveen's promotion to the Eredivisie and their participation in a KNVB Cup final.

In the summer of 1994, he joined Groningen, and on 5 May 1996, he announced his retirement from professional football.

Renowned for his unwavering dedication on the field, he earned the moniker De kuitenbijter ("the calf-biter"). Embraced by Heerenveen fans, he was affectionately referred to as "Mister Heerenveen" (Mister It Hearrenfean). Throughout his tenure at the club, he was thrice honored as the Supporters' Player of the Year.

== Coaching career ==
During the 2007–08 season, he assumed the role of head coach at VV Jubbega. Following this, in the 2008–09 season, he took charge as head coach at SV Donkerbroek. In the 2011–12 season, he led the Heerenveen Women's team as their coach. Subsequently, for the 2017–18 season, he took on the coaching position at the amateur football club VV Lemmer.

Moreover, between 2004 and 2008, he served as the equipment manager for the Netherlands U21 team, both before and during the 2008 Summer Olympics in Beijing. Additionally, during the visit of the Tibet national team to the Netherlands in 2008, he coached them during a training session.

== After football ==
After his football career, De Jong owned a sports store in Gorredijk, and during the 2000s, he engaged in activities with the supporters' association of SC Heerenveen, Junior Heroes. He has since resided in Oldeboorn.
