= Pietersma =

Pietersma is a Dutch surname. Notable people with the surname include:

- Albert Pietersma (1935–2025), Dutch-Canadian Ancient Greek philologist and academic
- Ariën Pietersma (born 1987), Dutch football player
