= Bas van Wegen =

Dutch footballer (born 1984)

Personal information
- Date of birth: 26 September 1984 (age 42)
- Place of birth: Nieuwegein, Netherlands
- Height: 1.86 m (6 ft 1 in)
- Position: Goalkeeper

Youth career
- Feyenoord

Senior career*
Years	Team	Apps	(Gls)
2005–2006	Omniworld	0	(0)
2006–2008	NAC Breda	0	(0)
2008–2010	HFC Haarlem	18	(0)
2010	Emmen	0	(0)
2010–2016	Alcides		
2016–2017	ONS Sneek	31	(0)
2020–2022	Jubbega		
Total		49+	(0+)
- * Club domestic league appearances and goals

Bas van Wegen (born 26 September 1984) is a Dutch former professional footballer who played as a goalkeeper.

== Career ==
Van Ween played youth football for Feyenoord, signing a new two-year contract with the club in June 2003, having provided cover to the first-team following injuries to other players. After playing for Omniworld, NAC Breda and HFC Haarlem, he signed for Emmen in January 2010 following Haarlem's bankruptcy. He had been offered a new contract by Haarlem at the end of the previous season. He was released by NAC at the end of the 2007–08 season, alongside Andro Franca, Benjamin van den Broek and Ariën Pietersma.

He then spent six seasons with Alcides, announcing in January 2016 that he intended to leave the club at the end of the season. Later that month it was announced that he would sign for ONS Sneek at the end of the season. In March 2017 it was announced that van Wegen would be retiring from football, but he later returned to play with Jubbega.
