= Nicole Delies =

Dutch former football striker

Personal information
- Full name: Nicole Delies
- Date of birth: 10 August 1980 (age 46)
- Place of birth: Groningen, Netherlands
- Position: Striker

Senior career*
| Years | Team | Apps | (Gls) |
| 1997–2001 | Velocitas 1897 | | |
| 2001–2002 | CVV Oranje Nassau | | |
| 2002–2004 | Saestum | | |
| 2004–2008 | CVV Oranje Nassau | | |
| 2007 | → Heerenveen | | |

International career
| 2000–2006 | Netherlands | 41 | (10) |
- * Club domestic league appearances and goals

Nicole Delies is a Dutch former football striker. She played for Velocitas 1897, SV Saestum and CVV Oranje Nassau in the former Hoofdklasse, winning the championship and playing the UEFA Women's Cup with Saestum. She played briefly for SC Heerenveen in the new Eredivisie before retiring in 2008.

She was a member of the Dutch national team, making her debut on 20 September 2000 against Belarus and played a total of 41 matches, the last on 2 November 2006 against the United States.

== International goals ==
Scores and results list the Netherlands goal tally first.

| Goal | Date | Venue | Opponent | Score | Result | Competition |
|---|---|---|---|---|---|---|
| 1. | 6 March 2001 | Sportpark De Hoge Neerstraat, Etten-Leur, Netherlands | Belgium | 1–1 | 5–1 | Friendly |
| 2. | 6 March 2001 | Sportpark De Hoge Neerstraat, Etten-Leur, Netherlands | Belgium | 5–1 | 5–1 | Friendly |
| 3. | 8 May 2001 | West Lothian Courier Stadium, Livingston, Scotland | Scotland | 2–0 | 4–0 | Friendly |
| 4. | 8 May 2001 | West Lothian Courier Stadium, Livingston, Scotland | Scotland | 3–0 | 4–0 | Friendly |
| 5. | 9 October 2001 | Gemeentelijk Stadion, Kontich, Belgium | Belgium | 1–1 | 5–2 | Friendly |
| 6. | 9 October 2001 | Gemeentelijk Stadion, Kontich, Belgium | Belgium | 5–2 | 5–2 | Friendly |
| 7. | 12 October 2005 | Oosterenkstadion, Zwolle, Netherlands | Switzerland | 4–0 | 6–0 | Friendly |
| 8. | 12 October 2005 | Oosterenkstadion, Zwolle, Netherlands | Switzerland | 6–0 | 6–0 | Friendly |
| 9. | 25 March 2006 | Andráshida, Zalaegerszeg, Hungary | Hungary | 3–0 | 5–0 | 2007 FIFA Women's World Cup qualification |
| 10. | 20 September 2006 | Oosterenkstadion, Zwolle, Netherlands | Austria | 2–0 | 4–0 | 2007 FIFA Women's World Cup qualification |
