= SC Heerenveen (women) =

Dutch women's football (soccer) club

Coordinates: 52°57′22.2″N 5°56′35.6″E

sc Heerenveen
- Full name: Sportclub Heerenveen Vrouwen
- Founded: 2007; 19 years ago
- Ground: Sportpark Skoatterwâld, Heerenveen
- Capacity: 3,000
- Chairman: Robert Veenstra
- Head coach: Niklas Tarvajärvi
- League: Eredivisie
- 2025–26: 7th
- Website: sc-heerenveen.nl
Home colours	Away colours

SC Heerenveen Vrouwen is a Dutch women's football club based in Heerenveen that competes in the Vrouwen Eredivisie, the top league in the Netherlands.

Several top Dutch footballers, including Lieke Martens, Vivianne Miedema, and Sherida Spitse, have played for the club. The club peaked in the league table with a third place finish in the 2017–18 season.

== History ==
SC Heerenveen was a founding member of the Vrouwen Eredivisie in 2007 and one of three clubs, along with FC Twente and ADO Den Haag, to field a team in the Eredivisie or BeNe League in every season. The club won the first-ever Eredivisie match, spoiling FC Twente's debut at the Arke Stadion, 3–2.

After finishing last in 2008 and 2010 and second-to-last in 2009, in 2011 the earned its best result yet, finishing 4th and reaching the KNVB Women's Cup final, losing to AZ Alkmaar. In April 2011, the club announced the women's team would disband at the end of the season, but it subsequently cancelled the decision. The following season, sc Heerenveen returned to the bottom of the table.

In the 2012–13 season, sc Heerenveen moved in the newly formed BeNe League. It was the second-to-last Dutch team in the league, an overall 11th position, though forward Vivianne Miedema led the league with 27 goals. Miedema and her club improved the following season, with the forward scored 41 goals, the most in a season for the short-lived league. The club finished in fourth place overall and third among Dutch clubs. The BeNe League lasted just one more season, in which the club finished in 10th place.

SC Heerenveen and other Dutch clubs returned to the Eredivisie for the 2015–16 season. In 2017 and 2018, the club again reached the semifinals of the KNVB Women's Cup, losing to PSV in 2017 and AFC Ajax in 2018. On 26 April 2019, sc Heerenveen announced it would cease competing in the league. However, on 19 June, the club reversed course and announced it would continue its women's team.

== Competition record ==
6	6	6	4	7	11	4	10	6	6	3	6	x	5	7
08	09	10	11	12	13	14	15	16	17	18	19	20	21	22
Women's eredivisie / BeNe League

x = season abandoned due to Covid-19

Season	League	Position	W – D – L = Pts	GF – GA	Top scorer	KNVB Cup
2007–08	Eredivisie	6 / 6	2 – 5 – 13 = 11	12 – 40	Delies, Eefting, Spitse (3)	Quarterfinals
2008–09	Eredivisie	6 / 7	6 – 3 – 15 = 21	28 – 43	Smit (14)	
2009–10	Eredivisie	6 / 6	4 – 6 – 10 = 18	19 – 30	Smit (11)	Quarterfinals
2010–11	Eredivisie	4 / 8	9 – 7 – 5 = 34	33 – 30	Smit (9)	Finalist
2011–12	Eredivisie	7 / 7	4 – 3 – 11 = 15	25 – 38	Miedema (10)	Quarterfinals
2012–13	BeNe League	11 / 16	9 – 6 – 13 = 33	55 – 50	Miedema (27)	Semifinals
2013–14	BeNe League	4 / 14	15 – 2 – 9 = 47	73 – 47	Miedema (41)	Quarterfinals
2014–15	BeNe League	10 / 13	7 – 2 – 15 = 23	26 – 44	Folkertsma (6)	Quarterfinals
2015–16	Eredivisie	6 / 7	4 – 5 – 15 = 17	21 – 54	Slegter (5)	Round of 16
2016–17	Eredivisie	6 / 8	9 – 3 – 15 = 30	53 – 60	Kets (16)	Semifinals
2017–18	Eredivisie	3 / 9	9 – 5 – 10 = 32	44 – 45	Kalma (21)	Semifinals
2018–19	Eredivisie	6 / 9	12 – 6 – 7 = 42	74 – 44	Hoekstra (12)	Quarterfinals
2019–20 ^{a}	Eredivisie	4 / 8	5 – 3 – 4 = 18	18 – 17	Hoekstra (4)	
2020–21	Eredivisie	5 / 8	6 – 6 – 8 = 24	32 – 38	van Dijk (7)	Quarterfinals
2021–22	Eredivisie	7 / 9	4 – 6 – 14 = 24	21 – 46	Ripa (7)	Quarterfinals
2022–23	Eredivisie	8 / 11	7 – 1 – 12 = 20	24 – 56	Ennema (10)	Quarterfinals
2023–24	Eredivisie	10 / 12	5 – 4 – 13 = 22	15 – 38	Ennema (5)	Quarterfinals
2024–25	Eredivisie	? / 12				

a = at time of cancellation of season due to Covid-19

== Players ==
=== Current squad ===
As of 1 February 2025.

Note: Flags indicate national team as defined under FIFA eligibility rules; some limited exceptions apply. Players may hold more than one non-FIFA nationality.

No.	Pos.	Nation	Player
1	GK	NED	Jasmijn Resink
2	DF	NED	Dewi Snippe
3	DF	NED	Fenna Meijer
4	DF	NED	Eef Smits
5	DF	NED	Iris Teijema
6	DF	NED	Chantal Schouwstra
7	DF	NED	Hester Algra
9	FW	NED	Evi Maatman
10	FW	NED	Jet van Beijeren
11	FW	NED	Lyanne Iedema
12	DF	NED	Tara Kommer
13	GK	NED	IIse van Rheenan

No.	Pos.	Nation	Player
14	DF	NED	Elize van Vilsteren
15	DF	NED	Helena Macleane
16	MF	NED	Ana Nassette
17	FW	NED	Britt Udink
18	MF	NED	Eef Kerkhof
20	FW	DEN	Silje Stockmar
21	MF	NED	Elfi Maass
32	MF	NED	Sanne van der Velde
39	FW	NED	Aymee Altena

Source: uk.women.soccerway.com

=== Former internationals ===
- (Netherlands) Cynthia Beekhuis
- (Netherlands) Marije Brummel
- (Netherlands) Nicole Delies
- (Netherlands) Nangila van Eyck
- (Netherlands) Fenna Kalma
- (Netherlands) Lieke Martens
- (Netherlands) Vivianne Miedema
- (Netherlands) Shanice van de Sanden
- (Netherlands) Sylvia Smit
- (Netherlands) Sherida Spitse
- (Netherlands) Lianne de Vries

== Head coaches ==
- (Netherlands) Harry Sinkgraven (2007–2009)
- (Netherlands) Rick Mulder (2009–2011)
- (Netherlands) Peter Meindertsma (2011–2012)
- (Netherlands) Maarten de Jong (2012)
- (Netherlands) Jessica Torny (2012–2015)
- (Netherlands) Fred de Boer (2015–2016)
- (Netherlands) Jan Schulting
- (Netherlands) Roeland ten Berge
- (Netherlands) Hans Schrijver
- (Finland) Niklas Tarvajärvi (2024–present)

== Broadcasting ==
All Eredivisie Vrouwen matches, as of 2024, are broadcast on ESPN in the Netherlands.
