= Grétar Steinsson =

Icelandic footballer

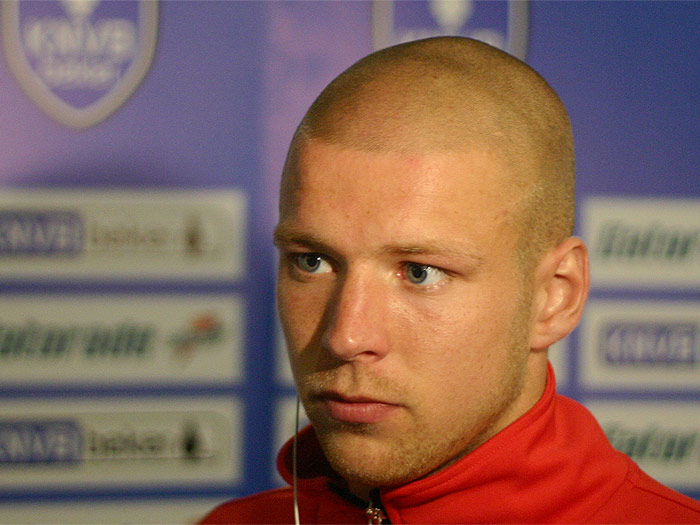
- Grétar in 2007

Personal information
- Full name: Grétar Rafn Steinsson
- Date of birth: 9 January 1982 (age 44)
- Place of birth: Siglufjörður, Iceland
- Height: 1.89 m (6 ft 2 in)
- Position: Right back

Team information
- Current team: Leeds United (Technical Director)

Youth career
- 1998–1999: ÍA

Senior career*
Years	Team	Apps	(Gls)
1997–1998	KS	8	(0)
2000–2004	ÍA	76	(11)
2004–2006	Young Boys	21	(3)
2006–2008	AZ	61	(7)
2008–2012	Bolton Wanderers	126	(5)
2012–2013	Kayserispor	9	(1)
Total		301	(27)

International career
1998	Iceland U-17	7	(0)
2000	Iceland U-19	4	(0)
2001–2003	Iceland U-21	11	(1)
2002–2012	Iceland	46	(4)
- * Club domestic league appearances and goals

Grétar Rafn Steinsson (born 9 January 1982) is an Icelandic former professional footballer who played as a right back.

== Club career ==
=== Iceland ===
Born in Siglufjörður, Grétar was spotted playing football when he was playing "seven-a-side football in the tiny fishing village" in his hometown, leading him to joining a youth team. Grétar started his career with local team KS in Siglufjörður, where he was a student at the time. before joining ÍA Akranes in 2000.

Grétar made his ÍA Akranes debut in the opening game of the season, in a 1–0 win over KF on 18 May 2000. Until the end of 2000, he went on to make 13 appearances, while he was captain for the youth side. His breakthrough in the first team attracted interest from European clubs, such as Heerenveen, 1860 Munich and Sheffield United.

The following 2001 season saw Grétar establish himself in the first team. He started the season well, scoring three times in the first five league matches. He later scored three more goals, including a brace against Valur on 13 August 2001. His performances at ÍA Akranes earned him a two–year contract extension. Grétar finished the season making 31 appearances and scored 7 times in the season while his club won the Icelandic title. He was also awarded the Most Promising Player and Team of the Year at the ceremony.

In the 2002 season, Grétar retained his place in the first team and scored on 29 May 2002, in a 3–1 win over Grindavík. By the end of the 2002 season, Grétar had made the total of 31 appearances and scoring 2 times in all competitions. After the 2003 season, during which he scored two goals 17 appearances,

=== Young Boys ===
After Grétar could not agree on a contract with ÍA Akranes, he moved abroad joining Swiss club BSC Young Boys on 24 July 2004, with the move taking effect the following January. Upon joining the club, the length of his contract length was revealed as two years.

Grétar made his Young Boys debut playing 22 minutes after coming on as a substitute in a 1–1 draw against Grasshoppers on 27 February 2005. He scored his first Young Boys goal in his first start for the side, in a 1–1 draw against Basel on 17 April 2005. This was followed by a goal in a 2–2 draw against St. Gallen. He added his third goal for the club on 18 May 2005, in a 3–2 win over Grasshoppers. By the end of the season, Grétar had made 15 appearances scoring three times.

In the 2005–06 season, Grétar became a first team regular for the side, making 8 appearances at the start of the season. He also scored in both legs against Lokeren in the UEFA Cup.

=== AZ Alkmaar ===
It was announced on 31 August 2005 that Grétar signed for AZ Alkmaar as a replacement for Jan Kromkamp.

Grétar made his AZ Alkmaar debut on 15 September 2005, starting the whole match in a right–back position, in a 5–3 loss to Krylia Sovetov Samara in a UEFA Cup Match. He then made his league debut, coming on as a late substitute and played 6 minutes, in a 4–2 win over Ajax on 18 September 2005. He then scored his first goal for AZ Alkmaar on 23 October 2005, in a 5–1 win over Willem II. He scored again on 18 December 2005, in a 3–0 win over RKC Waalwijk. Grétar scored again on 4 February 2006, in a 1–1 draw against Vitesse. After missing out three league matches in March, due to international commitment, Grétar scored on his return on 12 March 2006, in a 3–1 win over Willem II. Despite being out of the first team on three occasions, Grétar finished his first season at AZ Alkmaar, making a total of 28 appearances and scoring 4 times.

In the 2006–07 season, Grétar missed the start of the season, due to being on the substitute bench. Despite this, Grétar managed to regain his first team place and scored his first goal of the season, in a 2–0 win over Sparta Rotterdam on 14 October 2006. After being featured in a handful of first team appearances in the first half of the season, He scored again on 30 November 2006, in a 2–2 draw against Slovan Liberec. His performance in December 2006 led him to be linked a move to Hearts, a move he described it as a "step backwards" on his career. However, Grétar suffered a shoulder injury during a 2–1 win over Sevilla in a UEFA Cup match on 15 December 2006. After the match, it was announced that Grétar would be out throughout the rest of 2006 but expects to return in the winter break. After returning to the first team from injury in January, he regained his defensive position in the first team before rested for a match against Utrecht ahead of a UEFA Cup match against Newcastle United. In a UEFA Cup match against Newcastle United on 8 March 2007, Grétar scored in a 4–2 loss. After the match, Grétar said that AZ would score two goals in the next leg, a prediction that he made turned out to be correct, as AZ went on to win 2–0 and subsequently saw the club go through to the next round. After being out of the first team over suspension, Grétar was featured in the KNVB Cup Final against Ajax, playing 120 minutes and scored in the penalty–shootout, as AZ went on to lose 8–7 as a result. After injuring himself ahead of a match against FC Twente, resulting him missing out two matches, Grétar featured in both legs in the Play–offs for the European place against Ajax but lost 4–2 on aggregate. Despite this, Grétar finished the 2006–07 season, making the total of 45 appearances and scoring 3 times.

Ahead of the 2007–08 season, on 2 July 2007, AZ Alkmaar announced they had accepted a €3.5 million bid from Middlesbrough. Gareth Southgate had seen him as an ideal replacement for Stuart Parnaby. After the bid was accepted, however, AZ backtracked, claiming the price wasn't high enough and requested Middlesbrough to raise their bid to £4m. Instead, Middlesbrough turned their attention to Charlton Athletic right back Luke Young, who ended up making the move, ending Middlesbrough's interest in Grétar. After a failed transfer move in the summer, Grétar continued to impress when he set up a goal for Ari, in a 4–0 win over VVV-Venlo in the opening game of the season. Then, on 31 August 2007, he scored his first goal of the season, in a 3–0 win over Excelsior. After suffering from a back injury that plagued since his international career in October, Grétar made a return from injury for a match against N.E.C. Nijmegen on 3 November 2007, where he set up two goals, in a 4–0 win. He then scored again on 30 December 2007, in a 1–0 win over Heracles Almelo. Amid a transfer move to Bolton Wanderers, He made his last appearance for the club on 13 January 2008, where he played 13 minutes, in a 6–1 defeat to Ajax. By the time of his departure, Grétar made the total of 21 appearances and scoring 3 times.

Three months later, Grétar was given a farewell sendoff following an end to an AZ Alkmaar match.

=== Bolton Wanderers ===
Despite signing a new four-and-a-half-year contract with AZ in November 2007, Grétar signed for Bolton Wanderers on 16 January 2008 for a £3.5m fee. Prior to the move, he had been linked with the club six years ago and was recommended then Manager Sam Allardyce by his compatriot Guðni Bergsson but he decided against signing him.

Grétar made his debut, playing the whole game, against Newcastle United on 19 January 2008. In a 3–2 loss against Arsenal on 29 March 2008, he set up one of the goals for Bolton Wanderers, but it was overshadowed when Abou Diaby made a studs-up tackle on Grétar, resulting him Diaby sending off. After the match, he admitted to have avoid a seriously injury following a studs-up tackle from Diaby. The club then found themselves in the relegation zone, but managed to avoid it when Grétar and the club won the remaining five matches by picking up win against Middlesbrough, a draw against Tottenham Hotspur, a win against Sunderland and a 1–1 draw against Chelsea to keep them up which could have also decided who won the Premier League title. At the end of the 2007–08 season, he went on to make 16 appearances for the side. His quick impact and performance at the club earned him praises from Gary Megson.

In the 2008–09 season, Grétar started the season well when he scored his first goal for Bolton in the 3–1 victory over Stoke City on 16 August 2008. Since the start of the season, Grétar continued to established himself in the first team, playing in the right–back position. He then scored and set up one of the goals, in a 3–1 win over Middlesbrough on 22 November 2008. After signing a four-year contract with the club in March 2009, he then played a huge role for the side when he helped Bolton Wanderers push further into the top half of the table. In the last but one game of the season, Grétar's goal in a 1–1 draw against Hull City confirmed Bolton's Premier League survival. Despite missing out one game, due to suspension, Grétar made the total of 39 appearances (37 appearances in the league) and scoring 3 times in all competitions.

In the 2009–10 season, Grétar found himself in a competition with new signing, Sam Ricketts over a right–back position and the club's decision to re-shuffle the defence. Despite his limited playing time, Grétar played in a midfield position against Portsmouth and played a key role, in a 3–2 win on 12 September 2009. But by December, Grétar began to regain his first team place in the right–back position and was the outstanding performer for the whole game, in a 1–1 draw against Fulham on 28 November 2009. The following month, he scored his first goal of the season, in a 2–0 win against Sheffield United in the second round of the FA Cup. For the rest of the season, Grétar continued to feature in the first team under the new management of Owen Coyle, saying he's enjoying to play his tactics. However, in a 2–0 loss against Everton on 20 March 2010, he was sent–off in the 70th minute for a professional foul on Yakubu. After serving a match suspension, Grétar returned to the first team and regained his first team role for the rest of the season. Despite suffering from an illness later in the season, he went to finish the 2009–10 season, making the total of 31 appearances and scoring once in all competitions.

Ahead of the 2010–11 season, Grétar went through a minor operation in Iceland following a pain on his knee. Grétar continued to regain his first team place under Manager Coyle at the start of the season. On 6 November 2010, he then scored his first goal of the season, in a 4–2 win over Tottenham Hotspur. He was named Sky Sports Team of the Week. Shortly after being suspended, Grétar, however, lost his first team place to in-form Ricketts. On 26 December 2010, he regained his first place in a 2–0 win over West Brom. However, Grétar was sidelined from the first team on three occasions later in the season, due to injuries. At the end of the 2010–11 season, Grétar went on to make the total of 26 appearances and scoring once.

Ahead of the 2011–12 season, Grétar was expected to feature in the first team. He was featured in the first three matches before suffering a bruised foot. Grétar was further sidelined in the first half of the season, due to competition from new signing, Dedryck Boyata But Grétar was called upon to the first team in November by Coyle and featured regularly in the right–back position. He scored in the 3–1 home win against Liverpool on 21 January 2012. Although he appeared in and out of the first as the 2011–12 season progressed, Grétar finished the season, making the total of 26 appearances and scoring once in all competitions.

At the end of the 2011–12 season, Bolton were relegated and the club elected not to offer Grétar a new contract. Grétar acknowledged that he had little chance of staying at Bolton Wanderers when his contract was about to come to an end.

=== Kayserispor ===
After considering taking his time over his next club, it was announced on 22 August 2012, Grétar signed a two-year contract with Turkish Süper Lig club Kayserispor. It came after when he passed his medical test.

Grétar made his Kayserispor debut on 1 September 2012, playing the whole game, in a 1–1 draw against Akhisar Belediyespor. A month later, on 7 October 2012, he scored his first goal for the club, in a 2–1 win over Mersin İdmanyurdu. Grétar played regularly in the right–back position until he suffered an injury during a 1–1 draw against Gaziantepspor on 18 November 2012. Initially out between four and six weeks after surgery, Grétar was eventually sidelined for the rest of the season. Despite this, he went on to make a total of 9 appearances and scoring once.

It was announced on 1 July 2013 that Grétar left the club by mutual consent, with a year left to his contract. Two months later, after failing to find a club, Grétar announced on 27 September 2013 that he had retired from football.

== Post-playing career ==
Following his retirement, Grétar completed his studies on Football Management at Johan Cruyff Institute and holds the Level 5 (Technical Director) from the English FA.

Two months after joining AZ Alkmaar, on 21 January 2015, Grétar returned to English football, being appointed as technical director at Fleetwood Town of League One. As a technical director, his role was to handle scouting, player recruitment and development for the club. His time at the club was successful and despite "having one of the smallest budgets", they finished fourth place at the end of the 2016–17 season in EFL League One. However, in the 2018–19 season, the arrival of Joey Barton saw Grétar's role at Fleetwood Town was reduced with "the control of transfers".

Grétar then joined Premier League club Everton in December 2018 as Head of Recruitment and Development. During his time at the club, he was not only involved in the "whole structure of the club, not just the first team and under-23s" but also in the scouting and attended matches at the youth academy. Grétar was also involved in the transfer recruitments and played a role of the player's developments, including Jarrad Branthwaite and Anthony Gordon. After almost three years at Everton, he left the club following the departure of Marcel Brands.

On 2 July 2022, Grétar moved from a position as Technical Adviser to the Iceland FA and joined Tottenham Hotspur as Performance Director. After one season at the club, he left Tottenham Hotspur as part of restructuring under the new Chief Football Officer Scott Munn.

Grétar later joined Leeds United in the role of Technical Director on 18 July 2023, following the club's takeover by 49ers Enterprises. After a year with the club, he left Leeds United to take up a role at 49ers Enterprises.

== International career ==
After previously playing for all the youth levels representing Iceland, Grétar was called up for the senior team in February 2002. Upon learning of his call up, he described it as a dream come true.

He made his debut in a March 2002 friendly match against Brazil as a substitute and scored after being only 17 minutes on the pitch, in a 6–1 defeat. With his first appearance for the national side, Grétar become the third player from Siglufjörður to play for them.

Three years after making his senior team debut, Grétar was called up to the senior team again. His first appearance in three years came on 26 March 2005, in a 4–0 loss against Croatia. Later that year, Grétar scored two goals against South Africa and Bulgaria. Three years later, on 20 August 2008, Grétar scored again, in a 1–1 draw against Azerbaijan. A year later, Grétar was appointed as captain for the first time, in a 2–0 loss against Macedonia on 10 June 2009. Grétar was featured four times out of the five matches for Iceland throughout 2012.

After becoming established in the side in 2005, Grétar played regularly and made 46 appearances, scoring 4 times.

== Personal life ==
While growing up, Grétar watched English Football since he was six years old. In addition to Icelandic, he speaks English, German and Dutch. In addition to playing football, he also played badminton but realised that he had a "brighter future in football than in badminton". Gretar is married to Georgina Steinsson. They share three children Elma, Max & Luna.
