= Nikée van Dijk =

Dutch footballer

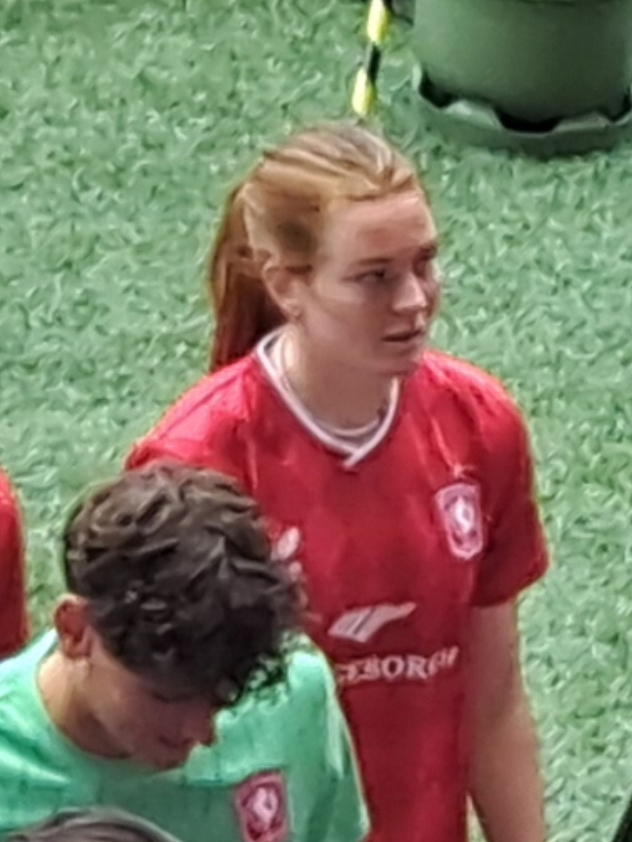
- Van Dijk in 2025

Personal information
- Date of birth: 25 June 2003 (age 23)
- Place of birth: Arnhem, Netherlands
- Height: 1.76 m (5 ft 9 in)
- Position: Forward

Team information
- Current team: RB Leipzig
- Number: 7

Youth career
- –2020: SC Heerenveen

Senior career*
Years	Team	Apps	(Gls)
2020–2022	SC Heerenveen	33	(8)
2022–2024	OH Leuven	56	(37)
2024–2025	Twente	21	(9)
2025–2026	Inter Milan	5	(1)
2026	→ TSG Hoffenheim (loan)	11	(2)
2026–	RB Leipzig	3	(0)

International career^{‡}
2019	Netherlands U16	1	(0)
2019–2020	Netherlands U17	2	(0)
2020–2021	Netherlands U19	4	(1)
2024–	Netherlands U23	2	(0)
- * Club domestic league appearances and goals as of 22:35, 8 October 2026 (UTC) ‡ National team caps and goals as of 15 February 2026 (UTC)

Nikée van Dijk (born 25 June 2003) is a Dutch professional footballer who plays as a forward for Frauen-Bundesliga club RB Leipzig. She has previously played for SC Heerenveen, OH Leuven, FC Twente.
