= Henrico Drost =

Dutch footballer (born 1987)

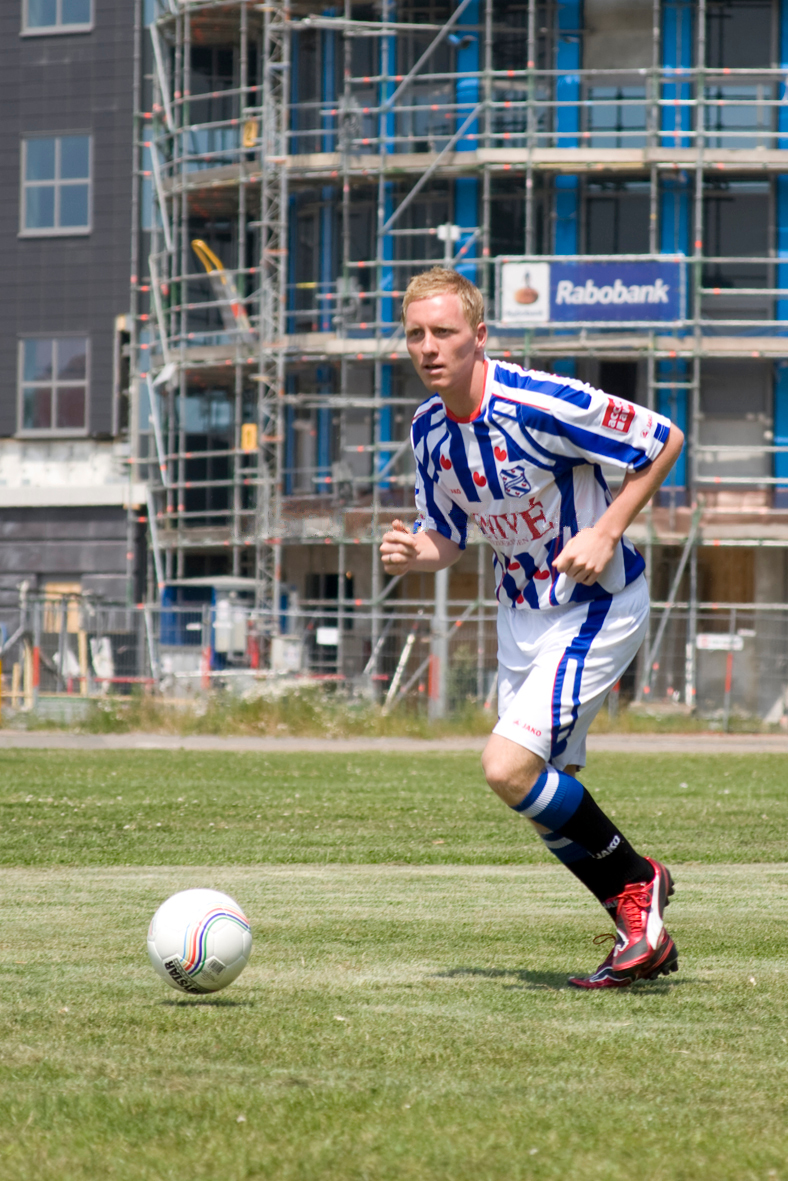

Personal information
- Full name: Henrico Drost
- Date of birth: 21 January 1987 (age 39)
- Place of birth: Kampen, Netherlands
- Height: 1.84 m (6 ft 0 in)
- Position: Centre-back

Youth career
- DOS Kampen
- Go Ahead Eagles
- 2001–2004: Heerenveen

Senior career*
Years	Team	Apps	(Gls)
2004–2010	Heerenveen	30	(0)
2006–2007	→ Excelsior (loan)	30	(1)
2009	→ De Graafschap (loan)	7	(0)
2009–2010	→ VVV (loan)	1	(0)
2010–2013	RKC	97	(3)
2013–2015	NAC Breda	51	(0)
2016–2017	Excelsior	34	(0)
2017–2020	RKC	66	(1)
2020–2021	ASWH	13	(0)
2022–2024	Jubbega		
Total		329	(5)

International career
2001-2002	Netherlands U15	4	(0)
2002-2003	Netherlands U16	5	(0)
2003-2004	Netherlands U17	8	(1)
2004-2005	Netherlands U19	10	(0)
	Netherlands U20	7	(0)
2005-2006	Netherlands U21	2	(0)
2006	Netherlands U23	1	(0)
- * Club domestic league appearances and goals

Henrico Drost (born 21 January 1987) is a Dutch retired footballer who played as centre-back.

== Club career ==
=== Heerenveen, RKC and NAC ===
Drost started his senior career in 2005 with Heerenveen, where he was usually a bencher. Heerenveen loaned him out to Excelsior, De Graafschap and VVV-Venlo.

In the summer of 2010 Drost signed a two-year contract with RKC Waalwijk after leaving Heerenveen on a free transfer. In the summer of 2013, Drost signed with NAC Breda for two seasons, to leave them for Excelsior on a free in 2015. Drost returned to RKC in the Eerste Divisie in the summer of 2017.

=== ASWH and Jubbega ===
In the summer of 2020, he moved to ASWH in the Tweede Divisie. In his first season, he played in three out of ASWH's 6 league games. In the fall season of 2011, he played in 10 of ASWH's 12 league games. In the winter break of 2021, he left ASWH, as his family needed to relocate. At the start of 2022, he joined VV Jubbega. He ended his football career in April 2024, a bit earlier than he had intended, after Jubbega pulled out of its league for financial reasons.

== International career ==
Drost played 8 games for the Netherlands national under-17 football team and 10 for the U19s.

== Personal life ==
Henrico Drost was born in Kampen. His twin brother is former professional football player Jeroen Drost.

== Honours ==
=== Club ===
Heerenveen

- KNVB Cup: 2008–09

RKC Waalwijk:

- Eerste Divisie: 2010–11
