= Xander Houtkoop =

Dutch footballer

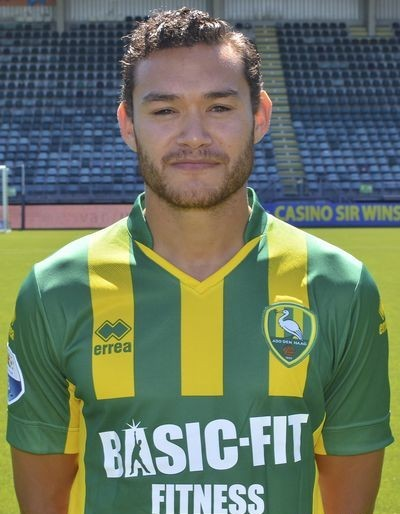

Personal information
- Full name: Xander Houtkoop
- Date of birth: 26 March 1989 (age 37)
- Place of birth: Amsterdam, Netherlands
- Height: 1.75 m (5 ft 9 in)
- Position: Winger

Youth career
- Heerenveen

Senior career*
Years	Team	Apps	(Gls)
2009–2010	Heerenveen	0	(0)
2009–2010	→ Emmen (loan)	36	(3)
2010–2011	Heracles	6	(0)
2011–2014	Go Ahead Eagles	93	(21)
2014–2015	ADO Den Haag	23	(3)
2015–2018	Cambuur	72	(7)
2018	HamKam	7	(0)
2019–2024	Jubbega		

International career
2007–2008	Netherlands U19	6	(1)
2009	Netherlands U20	4	(0)
- * Club domestic league appearances and goals as of 4 December 2018

Xander Houtkoop (born 26 March 1989) is a Dutch retired footballer who played as a winger. He formerly played for FC Emmen, Heracles Almelo, Go Ahead Eagles and ADO Den Haag. Houtkoop is known for his speed, creativity, close control and flair.

== Playing career ==
=== Heerenveen, Emmen and Heracles ===
Houtkoop began his career as a bencher at SC Heerenveen in the Eredivisie, failing to register an appearance. In the summer of 2009, Houtkoop signed a season-long loan with FC Emmen in the Eerste Divisie.

After an impressive campaign in Emmen, Houtkoop attracted the interest of Eredivisie-club Heracles Almelo. Following intense speculation surrounding his future, Houtkoop signed a two-year contract at Heracles Almelo in April 2010 after his contract at Heerenveen had expired. He had six caps for the club.

=== Go Ahead, ADO and Cambuur ===
In July 2011, Houtkoop signed with Go Ahead Eagles after his Heracles contract expired. With Go Ahead, he had 93 caps and 21 goals, helping Go Ahead return to the Eredivisie. In the summer of 2014, Houtkoop signed a two-year contract with ADO Den Haag. Here he had three goals. Houtkoop had the misfortune to score one goal against his own team in a game against Ajax.

In August 2015, Houtkoop signed a three-year deal with SC Cambuur on a free transfer. Houtkoop's three-year contract with ADO Den Haag was dissolved to allow this move. On 25 January 2017, Houtkoop was one of two Cambuur players to miss a penalty, after a 2016–17 KNVB Cup game against FC Utrecht ended 2–2. Cambuur won away, as three Utrecht players had missed. The contract with Cambuur expired in the summer of 2018.

=== HamKam, New Zealand and Jubbega ===
Houtkoop went to Hamarkameratene that played in the Norwegian First Division on trial. On 29 August 2018, he signed with the club for one season. His first game for HamKam was a 2–1 victory at home against Åsane on 2 September, where Houtkoop came on as a substitute for Abubakar Ibrahim in the second half. In total, Houtkoop played seven league games for HamKam.

After this adventure in Norway, Houtkoop had an internship in New Zealand, before refusing an offer from Canada. On 1 September 2019, Houtkoop joined VV Jubbega. Houtkoop was recruited to Jubbenga by its head coach Inne Schotanus, who was his trainer in the SC Heerenveen youth. In his first game for Jubbega, entering as a substitute, it managed to beat GOMOS 6–7 including 2 goals and 2 assists by Houtkoop, after GOMOS had led this cup game 6–2 and Jubbega had one player less due to a red card.

== International career ==
Houtkoop played 4 games for the Netherlands national under-20 football team.

== Personal ==
Houtkoop is married. He is partially of Indonesian descent. He works as a Physical Education Teacher in Leeuwarden.
