= Oebele Schokker =

Dutch footballer

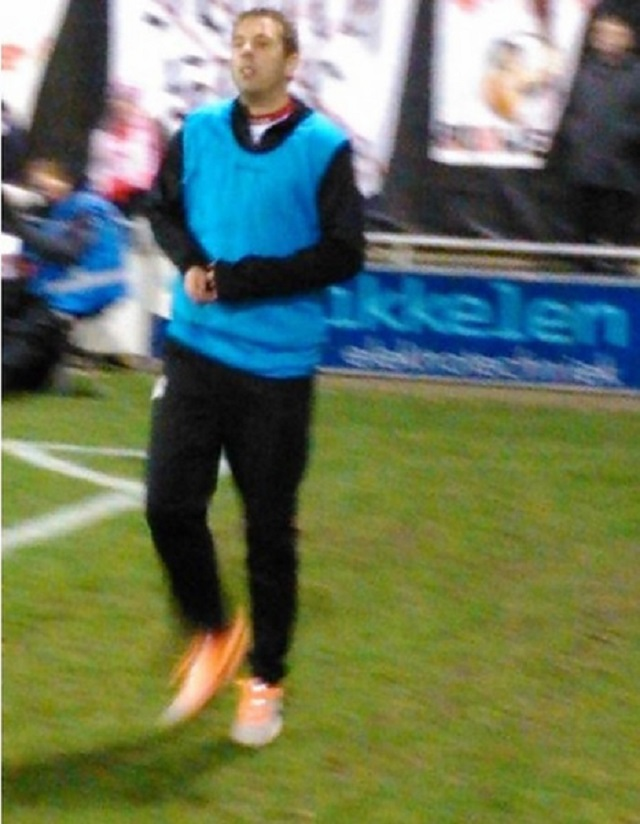

Personal information
- Full name: Oebele Schokker
- Date of birth: 11 November 1984 (age 41)
- Place of birth: Katlijk, Netherlands
- Height: 1.79 m (5 ft 10 in)
- Position: Striker

Youth career
- UDIROS
- SC Heerenveen
- VV Heerenveen

Senior career*
| Years | Team | Apps | (Gls) |
| 2004–2007 | SC Joure | | |
| 2007–2012 | Harkemase Boys | 60 | (22) |
| 2012–2015 | Cambuur | 39 | (5) |
| 2014 | → Emmen (loan) | 14 | (1) |
| 2015–2017 | Harkemase Boys | 38 | (9) |
| 2017–2019 | VV Jubbega | | |
- * Club domestic league appearances and goals

Oebele Schokker (born 11 November 1984) is a Dutch former professional footballer. He formerly played for SC Cambuur, FC Emmen and Harkemase Boys.

From the beginning of the 2017–18 season, Schokker began playing in the first team of VV Jubbega of the lower tier Tweede Klasse, also serving as an assistant coach. In April 2019, he returned to his youth club, UDIROS, where he heads the youth department.
