= Cynthia Beekhuis =

Dutch football midfielder

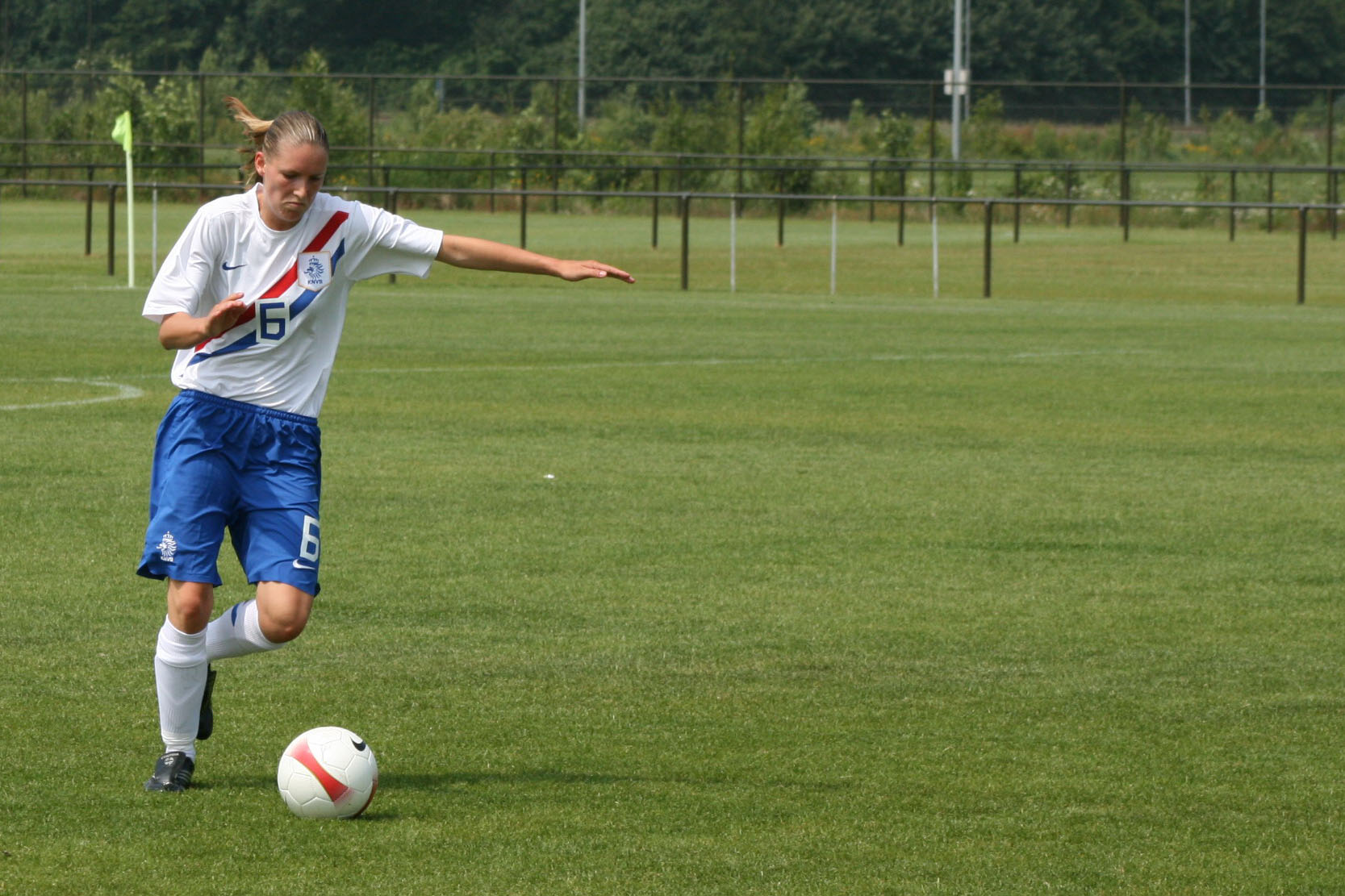

Personal information
- Full name: Cynthia Lysanne Beekhuis
- Date of birth: 13 March 1990 (age 36)
- Place of birth: Apeldoorn, Netherlands
- Position: Midfielder

Senior career*
Years	Team	Apps	(Gls)
- WWNA
2007–	Heerenveen	63	(6)

International career
2005	Netherlands U15	5	(1)
2006–2007	Netherlands U17	19	(2)
2007–2008	Netherlands U19	9	(1)
2010	Netherlands	5	(0)
- * Club domestic league appearances and goals

Cynthia Lysanne Beekhuis is a Dutch football midfielder currently playing for SC Heerenveen in the Eredivisie. She has played for the Dutch national team.
