= Chantal Schouwstra =

Dutch association football player

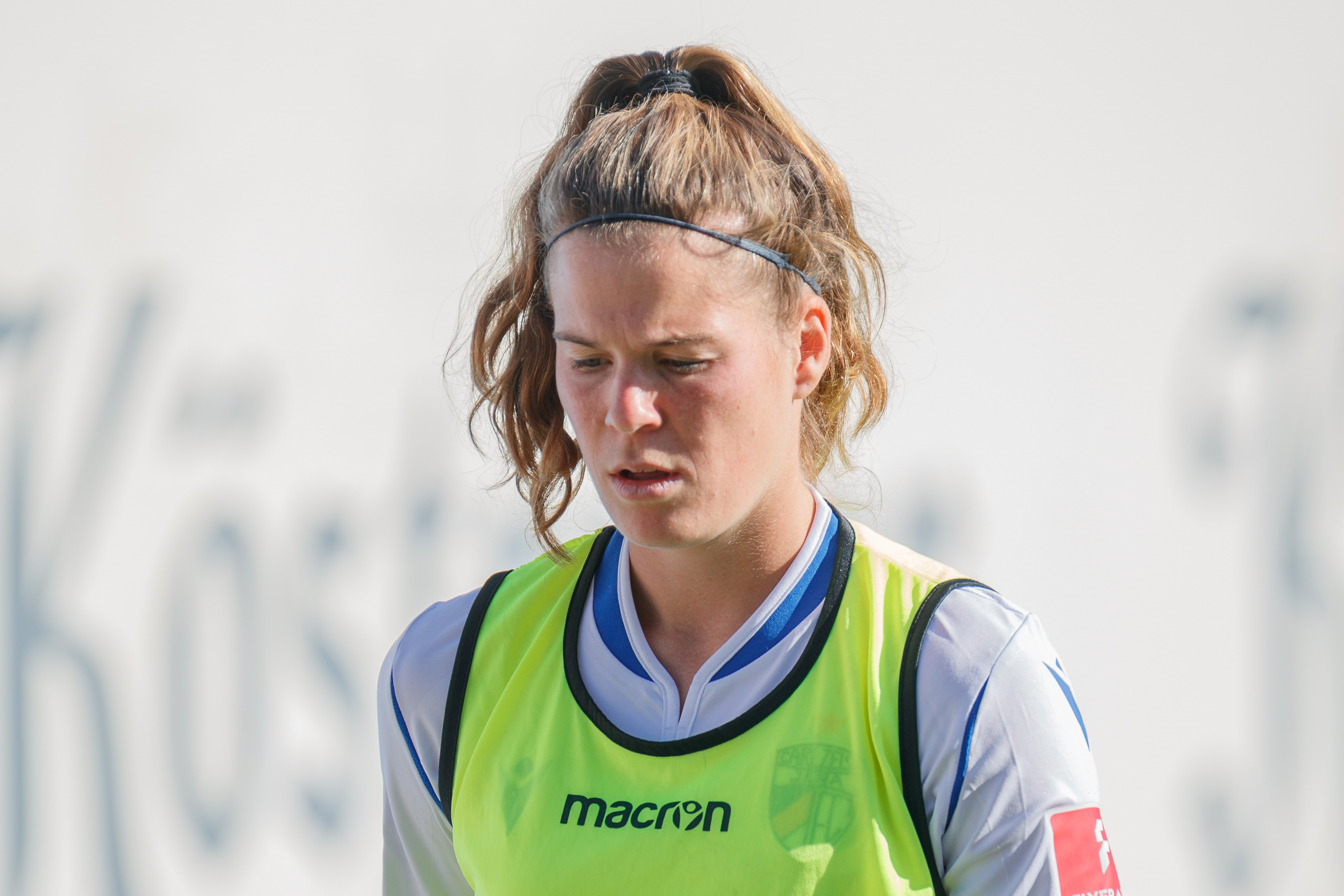

Personal information
- Date of birth: 15 April 1997 (age 29)
- Place of birth: Wolvega, Netherlands
- Position: Defender

Team information
- Current team: Heerenveen
- Number: 6

Senior career*
Years	Team	Apps	(Gls)
2016	PEC Zwolle	1	(0)
2016–2019	Heerenveen	41	(1)
2019–2021	Alkmaar	26	(2)
2021–2022	Carl Zeiss Jena	6	(0)
2023–	Heerenveen	36	(0)
- * Club domestic league appearances and goals as of 1 February 2025 (UTC)

Chantal Schouwstra (born 15 April 1997) is a Dutch footballer who currently plays for Heerenveen in the Dutch Eredivisie.

== Playing career ==
=== PEC Zwolle ===
Schouwstra made her league debut against Ajax on 1 April 2016.

=== First spell at Heerenveen ===
Schouwstra made her league debut against PSV on 18 November 2016. She scored her first league goal against Achilles '29 on 15 March 2019, scoring in the 61st minute.

=== Alkmaar ===
On 16 June 2019, Schouwstra was announced at Alkmaar. She made her league debut against Ajax on 25 August 2019. Schouwstra scored her first league goal against Heerenveen on 28 March 2021, scoring in the 90th+2nd minute.

=== Carl Zeiss Jena ===
On 13 July 2021, Schouwstra was announced at Carl Zeiss Jena. She made her league debut against Köln on 17 October 2021.

=== Return to Heerenveen ===
On 25 July 2023, Schouwstra was announced at Heerenveen. She made her league debut against AZ on 15 September 2023.

== Managerial career ==
Schouwstra was the head coach of MO16 of VV Alkmaar.
