= Michael Jansen =

Dutch footballer

Personal information
- Date of birth: 10 June 1984 (age 42)
- Place of birth: Nijmegen, Netherlands
- Height: 1.87 m (6 ft 1 1/2 in)
- Position: Defender

Senior career*
Years	Team	Apps	(Gls)
2002–2008	Vitesse Arnhem	60	(5)
2008	Feyenoord	0	(0)
2008	→ De Graafschap (loan)	5	(0)
2008–2009	Cambuur	36	(2)
2009–2011	Groningen	2	(0)
2010	→ Go Ahead Eagles (loan)	8	(0)
2010–2011	→ Veendam (loan)	33	(2)
2011–2012	Go Ahead Eagles	13	(0)
2012–2013	Spakenburg	10	(0)
Total		167	(9)
- * Club domestic league appearances and goals

Michael Jansen (born 10 June 1984) is a Dutch former footballer who played as a defender.

== Club career ==
=== Vitesse and cardiac arrhythmias ===
Born in Nijmegen, Jansen is a defender and made his debut in professional football with Vitesse Arnhem in the 2002–03 season. He was considered a big talent and his development was reportedly closely watched by Ajax Amsterdam among others. On 15 May 2005, in a match against Ajax, Jansen lost consciousness after suffering cardiac arrhythmia. He recovered but has to live with an ICD under his skin. He would not play any match for Vitesse after regaining fitness, but was still considered a squad member.

=== Life after Vitesse ===
In January 2008, Vitesse and Jansen parted ways, and on 18 January 2008, Jansen signed a six-month contract with Feyenoord, with an option for another three years. He joined fellow Eredivisie side De Graafschap on loan, to get used to professional football again.

In summer 2008, Jansen signed for Jupiler League SC Cambuur-Leeuwarden. After one year, FC Groningen noticed that Jansen played well enough to return to the Eredivisie. In January 2010 he moved to Go Ahead Eagles on loan to get more playing time since he had not been able to earn himself a place in Groningen's starting 11.
