= Jeroen Drost =

Dutch footballer (born 1987)

Personal information
- Date of birth: 21 January 1987 (age 39)
- Place of birth: Kampen, Netherlands
- Height: 1.84 m (6 ft 0 in)
- Position: Left-back

Youth career
- DOS Kampen
- 1996–2001: Go Ahead Eagles
- 2001–2004: SC Heerenveen

Senior career*
Years	Team	Apps	(Gls)
2004–2009	SC Heerenveen	47	(0)
2008	→ NEC (loan)	5	(1)
2008–2009	→ Vitesse (loan)	26	(0)
2009–2012	Vitesse	27	(0)
2011	→ FC Zwolle (loan)	12	(0)
2012–2013	De Graafschap	3	(0)
2013–2014	CSV Apeldoorn		
2015–2018	DOS Kampen		

International career
2001-2002	Netherlands U15	4	(0)
2002-2003	Netherlands U16	6	(0)
2003-2004	Netherlands U17	7	(0)
2004	Netherlands U19	2	(0)
2005-2007	Netherlands U21	4	(0)
- * Club domestic league appearances and goals

Jeroen Drost (born 21 January 1987) is a Dutch former professional footballer, who played as a left-back.

== Club career ==
Drost began his career with DOS Kampen and later joined the youth of Go Ahead Eagles from Deventer. He played some years with the youth from Go Ahead Eagles before being scouted in 2001 by SC Heerenveen. After three years in the youth academy of SC Heerenveen, he was promoted to the first team in 2004. Drost moved on loan to N.E.C. in January 2008. After a half year and five league matches with NEC, he returned to Heerenveen, and was once again loaned out, this time to Vitesse in July 2008.

Vitesse eventually decided to sign Drost, and he received a four-year contract lasting until mid-2013, but loaned him to FC Zwolle for half a season in 2011. He moved to De Graafschap in 2012, but only played 3 matches in an injury-hit season and was released by the club in April 2013.

After leaving de Graafschap, Drost moved into amateur football and joined Hoofdklasse outfit CSV Apeldoorn, only to leave them for childhood club DOS Kampen in winter 2015.

== International career ==
Drost played 7 games for the Netherlands national under-17 football team and represented his homeland in at the 2005 FIFA World Youth Championship in the Netherlands.

== Personal life ==
His twin brother Henrico Drost was also a professional footballer.
