= Sander van Gessel =

Dutch footballer (born 1976)

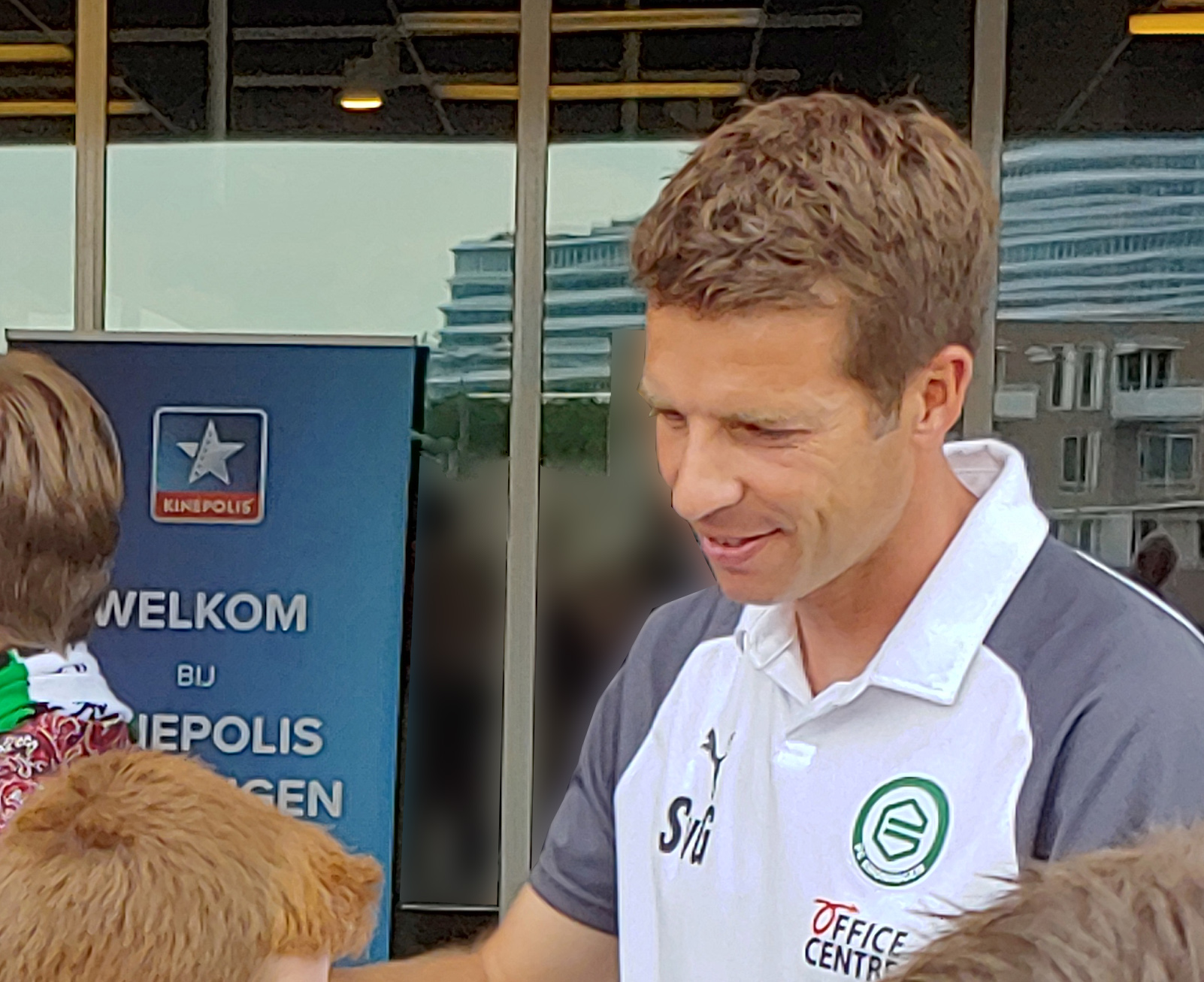
- at FC Groningen, 2019

Personal information
- Full name: Sander Branko van Gessel
- Date of birth: November 4, 1976 (age 49)
- Place of birth: Leidschendam, Netherlands
- Height: 1.96 m (6 ft 5 in)
- Position: Defender

Team information
- Current team: Groningen (academy coach)

Youth career
- SJZ
- Be Quick 1887
- Groningen

Senior career*
Years	Team	Apps	(Gls)
1995–2000	Groningen	45	(8)
2000–2002	Heerenveen	22	(1)
2002–2005	Groningen	119	(17)
2005–2008	NAC	75	(5)
2008–2010	Sparta	35	(1)
2011	JEF United	24	(2)
Total		320	(34)

International career
1992	Netherlands U17	1	(0)
- * Club domestic league appearances and goals as of 2009-08-02

Sander Branko van Gessel (born November 4, 1976, in Leidschendam, South Holland) is a Dutch retired footballer.

== Playing career ==
=== Club ===
He started his professional career in the 1995–1996 season playing for FC Groningen. He later served SC Heerenveen, NAC Breda and Sparta Rotterdam.

In summer 2010 he was signed by FC Edmonton in preparation for the club's competitive debut in the 2011 North American Soccer League season. However, van Gessel exercised a contract clause and left Edmonton on January 17, 2011, when JEF United Chiba of J2 League made a more lucrative offer. He fled Japan for Guam with Norwegian teammate Tor Hogne Aarøy after the Fukushima nuclear accident in March 2011.

=== International ===
Van Gessel was capped once by the Netherlands national under-17 football team.

== Coaching career ==
After retiring as a player, van Gessel worked for the academies at Sparta, NAC and FC Groningen.
