= Benjamin van den Broek =

New Zealand footballer (born 1987)

Personal information
- Full name: Benjamin van den Broek
- Date of birth: 21 September 1987 (age 39)
- Place of birth: Geleen, Limburg, Netherlands
- Height: 1.87 m (6 ft 1 1/2 in)
- Position: Midfielder

Team information
- Current team: Koninklijke HFC
- Number: 4

Youth career
- Unitas '59
- –1998: ESV
- 1998–2003: FC Eindhoven
- 2003–2008: NAC Breda

Senior career*
| Years | Team | Apps | (Gls) |
| 2006–2008 | NAC Breda | 0 | (0) |
| 2008–2010 | Haarlem | 57 | (10) |
| 2010–2011 | Shrewsbury Town | 22 | (1) |
| 2011–2015 | FC Den Bosch | 117 | (16) |
| 2015 | Universitatea Cluj | 5 | (0) |
| 2015–2016 | Barrow | 10 | (0) |
| 2016–2017 | Telstar | 49 | (4) |
| 2018 | Koninklijke HFC | 15 | (0) |
| Total | | 275 | (31) |

International career
| 2015 | New Zealand | 1 | (0) |
- * Club domestic league appearances and goals

Benjamin van den Broek (born 21 September 1987) is a New Zealand international footballer who plays as a midfielder for Koninklijke HFC in the Dutch Tweede Divisie.

Born in Geleen, van den Broek has played for clubs in the Netherlands, England and Romania.

He represented New Zealand at international level.

== Club career ==
He started his career with NAC Breda, but made no Eredivisie appearances for the club. He was released by NAC at the end of the 2007–08 season, alongside Andro Franca, Ariën Pietersma and Bas van Wegen.

In 2008, he moved to HFC Haarlem, where he made 57 appearances in the Eerste Divisie, scoring 10 goals.

After Haarlem went bust in January 2010, Van den Broek was left without a club. Despite attracting interest from Lierse SK of Belgium and FC Den Bosch, he signed for English League Two club Shrewsbury Town on 12 February until the end of the season. He made his debut on 6 March, replacing Jamie Cureton for the last 25 minutes of a 0–3 defeat at Grimsby Town. His first start came a week later in his first game at the New Meadow, lasting 73 minutes before being replaced by Steve Leslie in a 0–1 defeat to Rochdale. He scored his only goal for the club in a 2–3 home defeat against Morecambe on 1 May. Later that month, he signed a new one-year contract.

He signed a contract with Dutch club Den Bosch in spring 2011. On 2 February 2015, Van den Broek signed with Romanian Liga I side Universitatea Cluj.

In August 2015, Van den Broek signed for Conference side Barrow on a deal until the end of the season. However, in January 2016, Van den Broek left by mutual consent and went on to sign a two-and-a-half-year contract at Dutch side Telstar.

== International career ==
On 8 March 2015, Van den Broek was called into the New Zealand national football team to play a friendly against South Korea by coach Anthony Hudson. He qualified through his mother, who is from New Zealand. He made his debut in the match in Seoul on 31 March, replacing Bill Tuiloma for the final ten minutes of a 0–1 defeat.

== Career statistics ==
As of 31 March 2019

Appearances and goals by club, season and competition
| Club | Season | League | | | Cup | | Other | | Total | |
| Club | Season | Division | Apps | Goals | Apps | Goals | Apps | Goals | Apps | Goals |
|---|---|---|---|---|---|---|---|---|---|---|
| NAC Breda | 2006–07 | Eredivisie | 0 | 0 | 0 | 0 | 2 | 0 | 2 | 0 |
| Haarlem | 2008–09 | Eerste Divisie | 35 | 9 | 0 | 0 | 0 | 0 | 35 | 9 |
| Haarlem | 2009–10 | Eerste Divisie | 22 | 1 | 1 | 0 | 0 | 0 | 23 | 1 |
| Haarlem | Haarlem total | | 57 | 10 | 1 | 0 | 0 | 0 | 58 | 10 |
| Shrewsbury Town | 2009–10 | League Two | 11 | 1 | 0 | 0 | 0 | 0 | 11 | 1 |
| Shrewsbury Town | 2010–11 | League Two | 11 | 0 | 3 | 0 | 0 | 0 | 14 | 0 |
| Shrewsbury Town | Shrewsbury total | | 22 | 1 | 3 | 0 | 0 | 0 | 25 | 1 |
| Den Bosch | 2011–12 | Eerste Divisie | 30 | 5 | 2 | 0 | 1 | 0 | 33 | 0 |
| Den Bosch | 2012–13 | Eerste Divisie | 32 | 3 | 4 | 0 | 0 | 0 | 36 | 3 |
| Den Bosch | 2013–14 | Eerste Divisie | 35 | 6 | 1 | 0 | 2 | 0 | 38 | 6 |
| Den Bosch | 2014–15 | Eerste Divisie | 20 | 2 | 1 | 0 | 0 | 0 | 21 | 2 |
| Den Bosch | Den Bosch total | | 117 | 16 | 8 | 0 | 3 | 0 | 128 | 16 |
| Universitatea Cluj | 2014–15 | Liga I | 5 | 0 | 0 | 0 | 0 | 0 | 5 | 0 |
| Barrow | 2015–16 | National League | 10 | 0 | 3 | 1 | 0 | 0 | 13 | 1 |
| Telstar | 2015–16 | Eerste Divisie | 16 | 2 | 0 | 0 | 0 | 0 | 16 | 2 |
| Telstar | 2016–17 | Eerste Divisie | 33 | 2 | 2 | 0 | 0 | 0 | 35 | 2 |
| Telstar | Telstar total | | 49 | 4 | 2 | 0 | 0 | 0 | 51 | 4 |
| Koninklijke | 2017–18 | Tweede Divisie | 15 | 0 | 0 | 0 | 0 | 0 | 15 | 0 |
| Career total | | | 275 | 31 | 17 | 1 | 5 | 0 | 295 | 32 |
