= Andro Franca =

Dutch footballer

Personal information
- Date of birth: 18 October 1987 (age 39)
- Place of birth: Rotterdam, Netherlands
- Height: 1.67 m (5 ft 6 in)
- Position: Striker

Youth career
- Feyenoord

Senior career*
Years	Team	Apps	(Gls)
2007–2008	NAC Breda	0	(0)
2008–2009	Kozakken Boys		
2009–2014	Heerjansdam		
2014–2015	ASWH		
- * Club domestic league appearances and goals

Andro Franca (born 18 October 1987) is a Dutch retired footballer who played as a striker.

== Career ==
Born in Rotterdam, Franca played for Feyenoord and NAC Breda. He was released by NAC at the end of the 2007–08 season, alongside Benjamin van den Broek, Bas van Wegen and Ariën Pietersma.

After playing for Kozakken Boys, in 2014, Franca joined ASWH from fellow amateur side Heerjansdam after spending five years with that club.
