= Scott Munn (football executive) =

Australian businessman (born 1974)

Personal information
- Full name: Scott Anthony Munn
- Date of birth: 1974 (age 51–52)

Managerial career
- Years: Team
- 2009–2019: Melbourne City (CEO)
- 2019–2023: City Football Group (China CEO)
- 2023–2025: Tottenham Hotspur (Chief Football Officer)

Scott Anthony Munn (born 1974) is an Australian football executive who was most recently the Chief Football Officer of Tottenham Hotspur.

== Career ==
In 2009, Munn was appointed CEO of Australian side Melbourne City, becoming the first person hired by the club. While working for them, he helped them sign Australia internationals Daniel Arzani, Tim Cahill and Aaron Mooy and win the 2016 FFA Cup. Ten years later, he was appointed CEO of the China branch of City Football Group. Subsequently, he was appointed chief football officer of English Premier League side Tottenham Hotspur in 2023 until his departure in 2025.

== Personal life ==
Munn enjoys cycling as a hobby.
