= Jim van Fessem =

Dutch footballer

Personal information
- Date of birth: 7 August 1975 (age 51)
- Place of birth: Tilburg, Netherlands
- Height: 1.92 m (6 ft 4 in)
- Position: Goalkeeper

Senior career*
Years	Team	Apps	(Gls)
1994–2001	Willem II	122	(0)
2001–2004	Vitesse	39	(0)
2004	ADO Den Haag	1	(0)
2004–2008	De Graafschap	124	(0)
2008–2012	NAC	0	(0)
Total		286	(0)

International career
1996–1998	Netherlands U21	17	(0)
- * Club domestic league appearances and goals

Jim van Fessem (born 7 August 1975) is a Dutch retired footballer who played as a goalkeeper.

== Club career ==
Van Fessem was born in Tilburg. He played for Willem II, Vitesse Arnhem, ADO Den Haag, De Graafschap and NAC in the Eredivisie.

== International career ==
He represented the Netherlands at the 1995 FIFA World Youth Championship and earned 17 caps for the Netherlands U21 national team.

== Post-playing career ==
After retiring as a player, van Fessem was goalkeeper coach at the Willem II academy and head coach of Tilburg amateur club TSV Gudok from 2023 to 2025.

== Career statistics ==
Appearances and goals by club, season and competition
Club	Season	League		
Club	Season	Division	Apps	Goals
Willem II	1994–95	Eredivisie	1	0
Willem II	1995–96	Eredivisie	27	0
Willem II	1996–97	Eredivisie	17	0
Willem II	1997–98	Eredivisie	28	0
Willem II	1998–99	Eredivisie	34	0
Willem II	1999–2000	Eredivisie	9	0
Willem II	2000–01	Eredivisie	6	0
Vitesse	2001–02	Eredivisie	16	0
Vitesse	2002–03	Eredivisie	1	0
Vitesse	2003–04	Eredivisie	22	0
ADO Den Haag	2004–05	Eredivisie	1	0
De Graafschap	2004–05	Eredivisie	17	0
De Graafschap	2005–06	Eerste Divisie	38	0
De Graafschap	2006–07	Eerste Divisie	35	0
De Graafschap	2007–08	Eredivisie	34	0
NAC Breda	2008–09	Eredivisie	0	0
NAC Breda	2009–10	Eredivisie	0	0
NAC Breda	2010–11	Eredivisie	0	0
NAC Breda	2011–12	Eredivisie	0	0
Career total			286	0
