= Raymond Homoet =

Dutch footballer

Personal information
- Full name: Raymond Lesley Homoet
- Date of birth: 13 November 1978 (age 47)
- Place of birth: Hoorn, Netherlands
- Position: Goalkeeper

Senior career*
Years	Team	Apps	(Gls)
1998–2001	Elinkwijk		
2001–2007	Ajax Amateurs		
2007–2008	Volendam	0	(0)
2008–2009	Zwaluwen '30		
2009–2012	Elinkwijk		
2012–2014	Leonidas		
2015	Ajax Amateurs	3	(0)
2018–2019	DHSC		

International career
2004	Netherlands Antilles	1	(0)
- * Club domestic league appearances and goals

Raymond Lesley Homoet (born 13 November 1978 in Hoorn, Netherlands) is a Netherlands Antilles retired footballer who played as a goalkeeper.

== Club career ==
Homoet had one season in professional footbwll, when he joined Volendam but he was released by the club after one year and no games played. He had lengthy spells at the amateurs of Ajax and Utrecht-based club Elinkwijk. He left the latter for Rotterdam club Leonidas in 2012 and rejoined Ajax in 2015.

Two years after retiring from football, Homoet returned between the posts when he joined DHSC.

== International career ==
He was called up by Netherlands Antilles coach Pim Verbeek in 2004 for a game against Antigua, and was also part of Leen Looyen's team in 2008.

== Personal life ==
Surinam football legend Humphrey Mijnals was the grandfather of Homoet's wife.
