= Sebastiaan Steur =

Dutch footballer

Personal information
- Full name: Sebastiaan Steur
- Date of birth: 8 March 1984 (age 42)
- Place of birth: Naarden, North Holland, Netherlands
- Height: 1.87 m (6 ft 2 in)
- Positions: Striker; winger

Youth career
- ASC Waterwĳk
- Ajax

Senior career*
| Years | Team | Apps | (Gls) |
| 2002–2005 | Volendam | 60 | (6) |
| 2005–2008 | Heerenveen | 3 | (0) |
| 2006–2008 | Excelsior | 44 | (5) |
| 2008–2010 | Heracles Almelo | 14 | (2) |
| 2010–2012 | Spakenburg | 44 | (12) |
| Total | | 165 | (25) |
- * Club domestic league appearances and goals

Sebastiaan Steur (born 8 March 1984, in Naarden) is a Dutch former footballer who played as a striker. He formerly played for FC Volendam, SC Heerenveen, SBV Excelsior, Heracles Almelo and Spakenburg.
