= Roy Bejas =

Dutch retired professional footballer

Personal information
- Full name: Roy Bejas
- Date of birth: January 7, 1987 (age 39)
- Place of birth: Kerkrade, Netherlands
- Height: 1.86 m (6 ft 1 in)
- Position: Midfielder

Team information
- Current team: Groene Ster

Senior career*
Years	Team	Apps	(Gls)
2005–2007	Roda JC	0	(0)
2007–2008	→ Fortuna Sittard (loan)	15	(0)
2008–2016	Groene Ster		
- * Club domestic league appearances and goals as of 04:21, 16 February 2010 (UTC)

Roy Bejas (born 7 January 1987) is a Dutch retired professional footballer.

== Club career ==
Bejas is a forward who was born in Kerkrade and was part of the professional Roda JC squad, but did not make an official debut with the club. He was loaned to Fortuna Sittard in summer 2007.

He was released by Roda in 2008 and joined amateur side Groene Ster.

== Personal life ==
After quitting professional football, Bejas took up a job in fire security service.
