= Niklas Tarvajärvi =

Finnish footballer (born 1983)

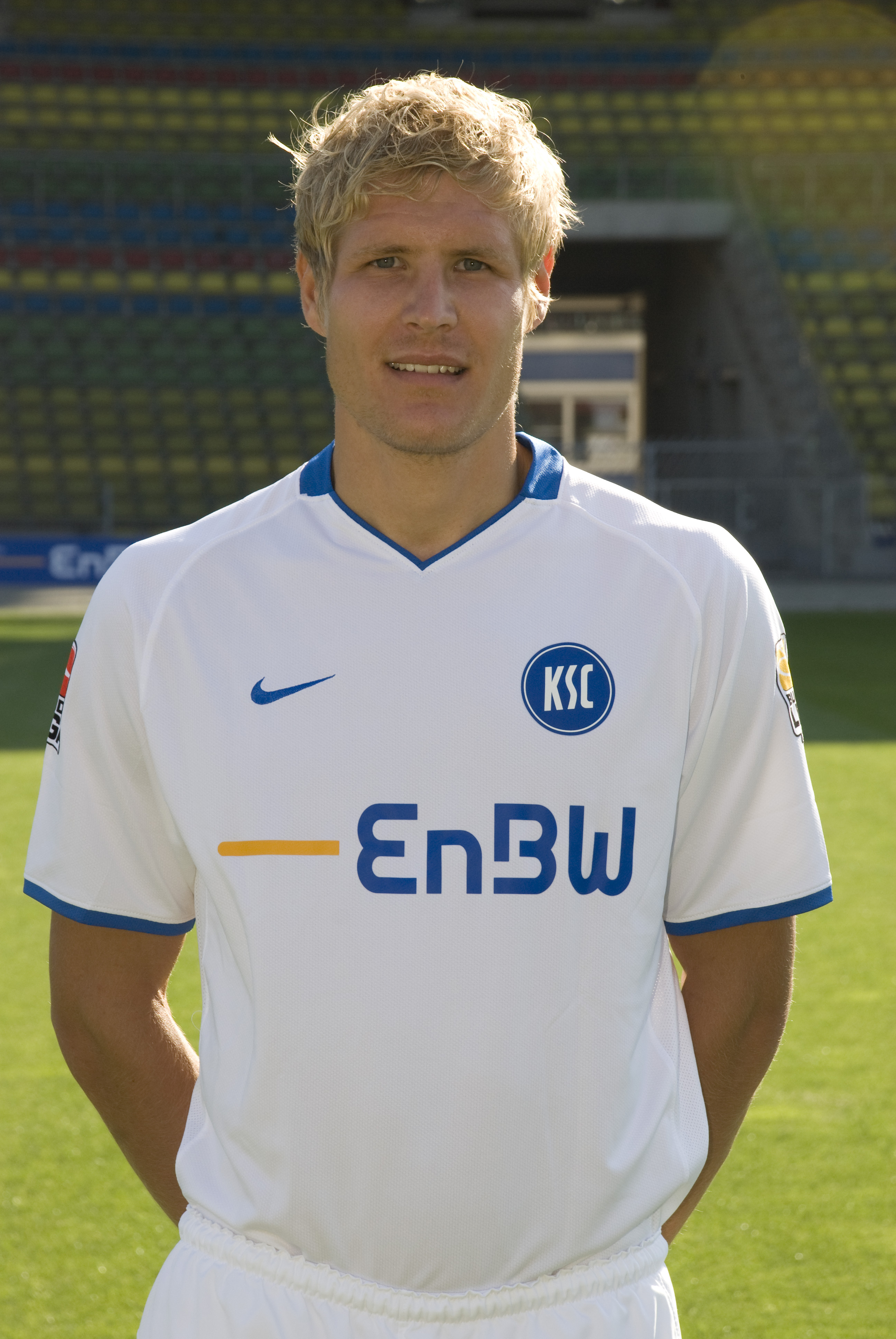
- Tarvajärvi with Karlsruher SC in August 2009

Personal information
- Full name: Niklas Henrikki Tarvajärvi
- Date of birth: 13 March 1983 (age 43)
- Place of birth: Tuusula, Finland
- Height: 1.85 m (6 ft 1 in)
- Position: Striker

Team information
- Current team: Heerenveen women (manager)

Senior career*
Years	Team	Apps	(Gls)
2001–2003	Jokerit	39	(11)
2004–2005	MYPA	37	(3)
2005–2009	Heerenveen	30	(4)
2007–2008	→ De Graafschap (loan)	28	(4)
2008–2009	→ Vitesse (loan)	11	(2)
2009	Neuchâtel Xamax	8	(1)
2009–2011	Karlsruher SC	20	(2)
2011	→ TPS (loan)	8	(2)
2011–2012	Go Ahead Eagles	11	(3)
2013	RoPS	10	(1)
2013–2014	SC Joure		
2015–2016	Staphorst	0	(0)
- Heerenveense Boys

International career^{‡}
2005–2009	Finland	4	(0)

Managerial career
- 2019–2024: Heerenveen (youth)
- 2019–2024: VV Heerenveen
- 2024–: Heerenveen women
Medal record
MyPa
Winner	Finnish Cup	2004
Winner	Veikkausliiga	2005
- * Club domestic league appearances and goals as of 17 April 2010 ‡ National team caps and goals as of 15 June 2010

Niklas Henrikki Tarvajärvi (born 13 March 1983) is a retired Finnish professional footballer who played as a striker. He is currently working as the head coach of Heerenveen women's team.

== Career ==
=== Jokerit ===
Tarvajärvi started his career at FC Jokerit in Finland's Veikkausliiga. During the 2001–2004 seasons, he represented the team in 39 matches and scored 11 goals.

=== MyPa ===
After FC Jokerit was sold to rivals HJK Helsinki in March 2004 and renamed to Klubi-04, Tarvajarvi transferred to MyPa. In the next two seasons, he made 37 appearances and 3 goals.

=== Heerenveen ===
In the summer of 2005, he moved to Heerenveen. Between 2005 and 2009, he made 30 appearances for the team and scored four goals. He also spent time on loan in De Graafschap and Vitesse Arnhem.

=== Neuchâtel Xamax ===
After almost four years in the Netherlands, Tarvajarvi joined Neuchâtel Xamax in February 2009 for a transfer fee of €500,000.

=== Karlsruher SC ===
He then signed a two-year contract on 21 July 2009 with Karlsruher SC.

=== Go Ahead Eagles ===
After his contract in Karlsruher SC ended he transferred to Dutch Eerste Divisie side Go Ahead Eagles.

=== RoPS ===
In April 2013, it was reported that Tarvajärvi had signed a contract with Veikkausliiga team RoPS. He decided to leave the team after only 10 appearances.

== International career ==
Tarvajärvi debuted in the Finland national team on 12 March 2005, coming on as a substitute against Kuwait in a friendly match.

== Coaching career ==
Since his retirement, he has worked as a youth coach for SC Heerenveen, and as a head coach for VV Heerenveen.

On 24 May 2024, Tarvajärvi was named the head coach of SC Heerenveen (women).

== Personal life ==
His grandfather was a TV and radiojournalist Niilo Tarvajärvi.

His son Niilo Tarvajärvi is also a footballer, playing for Ajax U16 youth academy team.

== Career statistics ==
=== Club ===
As of 31 December 2020

Appearances and goals by club, season and competition
Club	Season	League			National cup (Note: Includes Suomen Cup, KNVB Beker and DFB-Pokal)		Other		Continental		Total	
Club	Season	Division	Apps	Goals	Apps	Goals	Apps	Goals	Apps	Goals	Apps	Goals
Jokerit	2001	Veikkausliiga					—		—			
Jokerit	2002	Ykkönen					—		—			
Jokerit	2003	Veikkausliiga	25	7			—		—		25	7
Jokerit	Total		39	11			—		—		39	11
MyPa	2004	Veikkausliiga	24	2	1	0	0	0	2 (Note: Includes UEFA Intertoto Cup)	1	27	3
MyPa	2005	Veikkausliiga	13	1	0	0	0	0	4 (Note: Includes UEFA Cup)	0	17	1
MyPa	Total		37	3	1	0	0	0	6	1	44	4
Heerenveen	2005–06	Eredivisie	17	3	1	0	1	0	—		19	3
Heerenveen	2006–07	Eredivisie	13	1	0	0	1	0	2	0	16	1
Heerenveen	Total		30	4	1	0	2	0	2	0	35	4
De Graafschap (loan)	2007–08	Eredivisie	28	4	—		3	4	—		31	8
Vitesse (loan)	2008–09	Eredivisie	11	2	1	0	—		—		12	2
Neuchâtel Xamax	2008–09	Swiss Super League	8	1	—		—		—		8	1
Karlsruher SC II	2009–10	Regionalliga Süd	2	0	—		—		—		2	0
Karlsruher SC	2009–10	2. Bundesliga	19	2	2	0	—		—		21	2
Karlsruher SC	2010–11	2. Bundesliga	1	0	—		—		—		1	0
Karlsruher SC	Total		20	2	2	0	0	0	0	0	22	2
TPS (loan)	2011	Veikkausliiga	8	2	—		—		—		8	2
Go Ahead Eagles	2011–12	Eerste Divisie	11	3	1	0	—		—		12	3
RoPS	2013	Veikkausliiga	10	1	0	0	0	0	—		10	1
Career total			214	34	6	0	5	4	8	1	233	39

=== International ===
As of 17 June 2013

Finland national team
Year	Apps	Goals
2005	2	0
2006	0	0
2007	0	0
2008	1	0
2009	1	0
Total	4	0

== Honours ==
=== Club ===
MyPa

- Veikkausliiga: 2005
- Finnish Cup: 2004
