= Ariën Pietersma =

Dutch footballer

Personal information
- Date of birth: 24 April 1987 (age 39)
- Place of birth: Dinteloord, Netherlands
- Height: 1.85 m (6 ft 1 in)
- Position: Goalkeeper

Youth career
- VV Dinteloord

Senior career*
Years	Team	Apps	(Gls)
2005–2008	NAC Breda	0	(0)
2007–2008	→ RBC Roosendaal (loan)	0	(0)
2008–2010	Willem II	0	(0)
2009	→ RBC Roosendaal (loan)	11	(0)
2010	Dijkse Boys	14	(0)
2013–2015	VV Dinteloord		
2015–2016	Vlissingen		
2016–2022	Halsteren	16	(0)
2022–2024	VV Prinsenland		
Total		41	(0)
- * Club domestic league appearances and goals as of 3 December 2010

Ariën Pietersma (born 24 April 1987) is a Dutch former footballer who plays as a goalkeeper.

== Career ==
Pietersma's first encounter with professional football was in the 2006–07 season with NAC Breda. He was convicted of burglary in 2007, and was then loaned to RBC Roosendaal for the following season.

He was released by NAC at the end of the 2007–08 season, alongside Andro Franca, Benjamin van den Broek and Bas van Wegen.

Pietersma was signed by Willem II in July 2008, as they were searching for a third goalkeeper. In 2009 he was once again loaned out to RBC, and then in 2010 he played for Dijkse Boys until the club withdrew from the Topklasse for financial reasons. In his last game against SC Genemuiden Pietersma was shown the red card for a scandalous foul of 'ernstig gemeen spel' (seriously mean play), which earned him a seven game suspension as the KNVB stated.
