= VV Jubbega =

- Full name: Voetbalvereniging Jubbega
- Founded: 14 April 1945
- Ground: Sportpark it Heidefjild, Jubbega, Netherlands
- Manager: Wim de Ron
- League: Eerste Klasse
- Website: https://www.vvjubbega.nl/
colors

Voetbalvereniging Jubbega (VV Jubbega) is an association football club from Jubbega, Netherlands, founded in 1945 from a merger of two local clubs. Its home games are played at Sportpark it Heidefjild. Jubbega's colors are red and white.

== History ==
=== 20th century ===
VV Jubbega was founded on 14 April 1945 through the merger of the Rode Duivels (Red Devils) and Samenspel Doet Overwinnen (Teamworks Wins).

In 1948, it joined the Vierde Klasse of the KNVB, immediately taking a section championship. Since, it has been hovering between the Vierde and Eerste Klasse, peaking in 1963 as third in the Eerste. An exception was 1998–99 when Jubbenga played in the Vijfde Klasse, immediately bouncing back through a section championship and automatic promotion.

=== 21st century ===
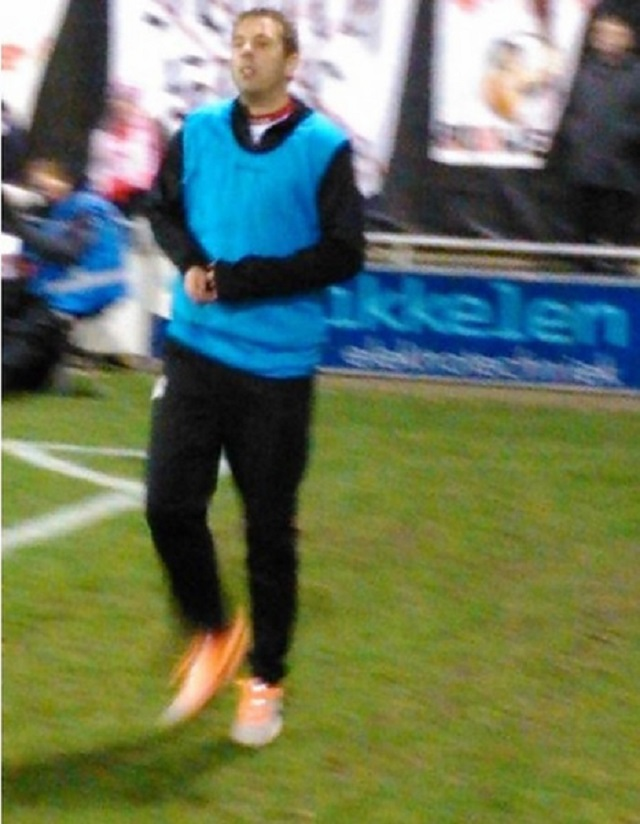
Oebele Schokker,
player of 2017–19

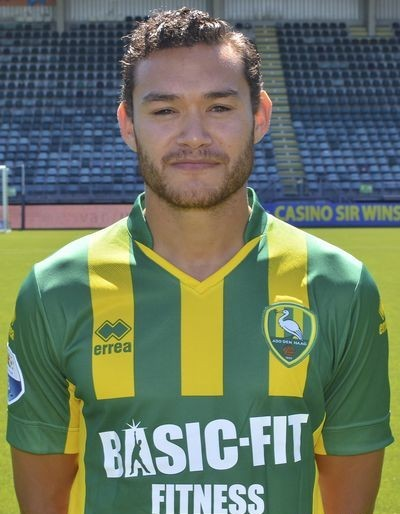
Xander Houtkoop,
player since 2019

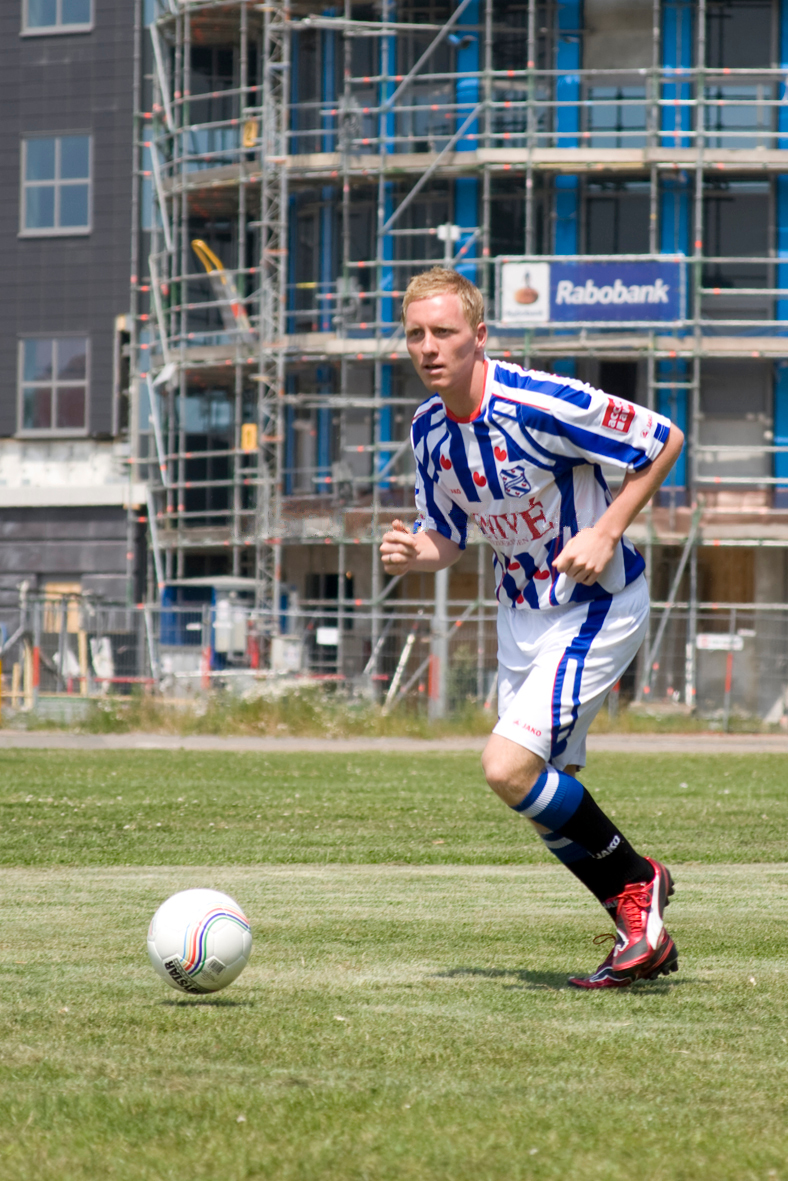
Henrico Drost,
player since 2022

From 2017 through 2019, former professional player Oebele Schokker played on the Saturday first squad, doubling as assistant coach. In 2019, Jubbega was joined by Xander Houtkoop, another former prof. In 2020, Jubbega promoted to the Eerste Klasse. At the start of 2022, it was joined by the former prof Henrico Drost.

=== Honors ===
- Tweede Klasse championships: 1961, 1966, 1972
- Derde Klasse championships: 1958, 1971, 2018
- Vierde Klasse championships: 1949, 1986, 1989, 1991, 2012, 2016
- Vijfde Klasse championship: 1999

=== Head coach ===
- Henk Konings (2010–11)
- Johnny Wassenaar (2015–18)
- Inne Schotanus (2018–)
