= Rogier Molhoek =

Dutch footballer and coach (born 1981)

Personal information
- Full name: Rogier Marinus Molhoek
- Date of birth: 22 July 1981 (age 45)
- Place of birth: Oud-Beijerland, Netherlands
- Height: 1.86 m (6 ft 1 in)
- Position: Midfielder

Team information
- Current team: Hibernian (performance coach)

Youth career
- SHO
- Dordrecht '90

Senior career*
Years	Team	Apps	(Gls)
1999–2001	Dordrecht '90	30	(3)
2001–2005	RKC Waalwijk	83	(6)
2006–2009	AZ	18	(0)
2007–2008	→ NAC Breda (loan)	26	(3)
2008–2009	→ Vitesse (loan)	29	(0)
2009–2011	Vitesse	16	(0)
2011–2012	VVV-Venlo	13	(0)
2012–2013	Dordrecht	14	(0)
Total		229	(12)

International career
2002–2003	Netherlands U21	3	(0)
- * Club domestic league appearances and goals

Rogier Marinus Molhoek (born 22 July 1981) is a Dutch former professional footballer who played as a midfielder. He is currently performance manager at Scottish Premiership club Hibernian.

== Club career ==
Molhoek previously played several years for Dordrecht '90, RKC Waalwijk, AZ, Vitesse and VVV-Venlo. He had emerged as a talented defensive midfielder at RKC, and was signed by AZ in January 2006 on a four-and-a-half-year contract in a move, which saw Danny Mathijssen move the other way on loan. His time in Alkmaar was, however, marked by injuries and he struggled to establish himself in the starting lineup. After loans at NAC Breda and Vitesse, he signed a permanent two-and-a-half-year deal with the latter on 14 January 2009 with Julian Jenner making the same move.

Molhoek signed his last professional contract with FC Dordrecht in July 2012. On 8 April 2013, Molhoek announced his retirement from professional football, returning to his youth club SHO in his hometown Oud-Beijerland, after the season. Due to a lingering ankle injury, Molhoek was no longer able to continue playing professionally. He would also join the coaching staff of the youth department of Dordrecht. He retired from SHO in early 2015 due to injuries.

== International career ==
Molhoek gained three caps for the Netherlands under-21 team, making his debut on 6 September 2002 in the 0–1 loss to Belarus. He also appeared as team captain of the U21s.

== Coaching career ==
Molhoek became assistant coach of the Dordrecht first team in February 2015. He joined the NAC Breda academy in March 2017, initially coaching the under-17 team. In January 2020 he was promoted to assistant coach of the first team under Peter Hyballa, but stepped down at his own request on 10 February, returning to the under-17 side. From the 2020–21 season he and Michael Dingsdag jointly coached NAC's under-21 and under-18 teams, the under-19 side having been dissolved.

Molhoek returned to the NAC first team as assistant manager, remaining in the role under Robert Molenaar from June 2022, and stayed until 2024. In October 2024 he joined Belgian club Beveren as assistant to Marink Reedijk. Beveren won the Challenger Pro League in 2025–26, finishing the season unbeaten and 21 points clear.

Reedijk left Beveren at the end of that season and was appointed manager of Scottish Premiership club Hibernian in September 2026, bringing Molhoek with him as his assistant on a three-year contract.
