= List of Dutch football transfers summer 2009 =

This is a list of transfers in Dutch football for the 2009 summer transfer window. Only moves featuring an Eredivisie side and/or an Eerste Divisie side are listed.

== Eredivisie ==
=== ADO Den Haag ===
In: Note: Flags indicate national team as defined under FIFA eligibility rules; some limited exceptions apply. Players may hold more than one non-FIFA nationality.

No.	Pos.	Nation	Player
1	GK	NED	Boy Waterman (On loan from AZ)
12	MF	NED	Ricky van den Bergh (From Heracles Almelo)
13	FW	NED	Raily Ignacio (From Westlandia)
33	FW	NED	Danny van der Ree (From Willem II Tilburg)
40	MF	NED	Levi Schwiebbe (Loan return from HFC Haarlem)
41	DF	NED	Lorenzo Piqué (From Feyenoord)

Out: Note: Flags indicate national team as defined under FIFA eligibility rules; some limited exceptions apply. Players may hold more than one non-FIFA nationality.

No.	Pos.	Nation	Player
4	DF	POR	Virgilio Teixeira (retired)
14	FW	NED	Berry Powel (On loan to De Graafschap)
18	MF	BEL	Tim De Meersman (To FCV Dender EH)
20	FW	BEL	Fabio Caracciolo (On loan to FC Den Bosch)
24	DF	NED	Samir El Moussaoui (To FC Den Bosch)]

=== AFC Ajax ===
In: Note: Flags indicate national team as defined under FIFA eligibility rules; some limited exceptions apply. Players may hold more than one non-FIFA nationality.

No.	Pos.	Nation	Player
4	DF	BRA	José Eduardo de Araújo (Loan from (Brazil) Cruzeiro Esporte Clube)
7	DF	CMR	Timothee Atouba (From (Germany) Hamburger SV)
9	FW	SRB	Marko Pantelić (From (Germany) Hertha BSC)
28	FW	DEN	Dennis Rommedahl (Loan return from (Netherlands) NEC)
30	DF	ROU	George Ogăraru (Loan return from (Romania) FC Steaua București)
32	MF	BRA	Kerlon Moura Souza (Loan from (Italy) F.C. Internazionale Milano)
40	MF	NED	Demy de Zeeuw (From (Netherlands) AZ Alkmaar)
41	GK	NED	Jeroen Verhoeven (From (Netherlands) FC Volendam)

Out: Note: Flags indicate national team as defined under FIFA eligibility rules; some limited exceptions apply. Players may hold more than one non-FIFA nationality.

No.	Pos.	Nation	Player
4	DF	BEL	Thomas Vermaelen (To (England) Arsenal FC)
23	FW	BRA	Leonardo Vitor Santiago (Free to (Netherlands) NAC Breda)
24	MF	NED	Jan-Arie van der Heijden (Loan to (Netherlands) Willem II Tilburg)
25	MF	NED	Evander Sno (Loan to (England) Bristol City F.C.)
30	GK	NED	Dennis Gentenaar (To (Netherlands) VVV-Venlo)
32	FW	ESP	Albert Luque (To (Spain) Málaga, previously out on loan)
37	DF	NED	Robbert Schilder (To (Netherlands) NAC Breda)
38	DF	NED	Donovan Slijngard (To (Netherlands) Sparta, previously out on loan)
39	FW	CRO	Darko Bodul (Loan to (Netherlands) Sparta)

=== AZ ===
In: Note: Flags indicate national team as defined under FIFA eligibility rules; some limited exceptions apply. Players may hold more than one non-FIFA nationality.

No.	Pos.	Nation	Player
16	MF	SWE	Pontus Wernbloom (From (Sweden) IFK Göteborg)
21	GK	NED	Erik Heijblok (From De Graafschap)
20	MF	SWE	Rasmus Elm (From (Sweden) Kalmar FF)

Out: Note: Flags indicate national team as defined under FIFA eligibility rules; some limited exceptions apply. Players may hold more than one non-FIFA nationality.

No.	Pos.	Nation	Player
12	DF	NED	Milano Koenders (released)
14	DF	NED	Ryan Donk (To Club Brugge K.V.)
16	DF	FIN	Toni Kolehmainen (released)
17	MF	NED	Kemy Agustien (On loan to RKC Waalwijk)
20	MF	NED	Demy de Zeeuw (To AFC Ajax)
21	GK	NED	Boy Waterman (On loan to ADO Den Haag)
—	MF	GER	Simon Cziommer (To Red Bull Salzburg)
3	DF	NED	Gijs Luirink (On loan to RKC Waalwijk)

=== Feyenoord ===
In: Note: Flags indicate national team as defined under FIFA eligibility rules; some limited exceptions apply. Players may hold more than one non-FIFA nationality.

No.	Pos.	Nation	Player
2	DF	SRB	Aleksandar Ignjatović (On loan from (Serbia) FK Borac Čačak)
17	GK	NED	Erwin Mulder (Loan return from SBV Excelsior)
21	DF	ESP	Dani Fernandez (From (Ukraine) FC Metalurh Donetsk)
23	FW	CIV	Sekou Cissé (From Roda JC)

Out: Note: Flags indicate national team as defined under FIFA eligibility rules; some limited exceptions apply. Players may hold more than one non-FIFA nationality.

No.	Pos.	Nation	Player
1	GK	NED	Henk Timmer (released)
2	DF	NED	Theo Lucius (released)
14	FW	NED	Michael Mols (retired)
15	FW	RSA	Kermit Erasmus (On loan to SBV Excelsior)
18	DF	NED	Serginho Greene (released)
19	MF	POL	Michal Janota (On loan to SBV Excelsior)
26	FW	NED	Jordao Pattinama (On loan to SBV Excelsior)
28	DF	NED	Norichio Nieveld (On loan to SBV Excelsior)
30	MF	NED	Nicky Hofs (To Vitesse Arnhem)
35	DF	NED	Kevin Wattamaleo (On loan to SBV Excelsior)
42	MF	NED	Glenn Kobussen (To Go Ahead Eagles)
-	FW	KOR	Lee Chun-Soo (To Al-Nassr)
-	GK	EGY	Sherif Ekramy (To El Gouna FC)

=== FC Groningen ===
In: Note: Flags indicate national team as defined under FIFA eligibility rules; some limited exceptions apply. Players may hold more than one non-FIFA nationality.

No.	Pos.	Nation	Player
4	DF	NED	Michael Jansen (From SC Cambuur)
16	FW	NED	Serhat Koç (From FC Eindhoven)
—	MF	NED	Danny Post (From HFC Haarlem)
—	MF	NED	Jeffrey Rijsdijk (From Sparta Rotterdam)
6	DF	NED	Mike Zonneveld (On loan from PSV Eindhoven)

Out: Note: Flags indicate national team as defined under FIFA eligibility rules; some limited exceptions apply. Players may hold more than one non-FIFA nationality.

No.	Pos.	Nation	Player
6	MF	NED	Paul Matthijs (To BV Veendam)
8	MF	UKR	Evgeniy Levchenko (To FC Saturn Moscow Oblast)
9	FW	SWE	Marcus Berg (To Hamburger SV)
16	GK	NED	Gijs Koopmans (To Gronitas)
17	MF	NED	Martijn Meerdink (To De Graafschap)
19	DF	NED	Jeroen Veldmate (On loan to Helmond Sport)

=== SC Heerenveen ===
In: Note: Flags indicate national team as defined under FIFA eligibility rules; some limited exceptions apply. Players may hold more than one non-FIFA nationality.

No.	Pos.	Nation	Player
11	FW	CZE	Michal Papadopulos (From (Czech Republic) FK Mladá Boleslav)
26	DF	SRB	Igor Đurić (From (Serbia) FK Vojvodina)
37	DF	NED	Gerry Koning (From FC Volendam)
40	FW	MKD	Samir Fazli (From (North Macedonia) FK Makedonija)

Out: Note: Flags indicate national team as defined under FIFA eligibility rules; some limited exceptions apply. Players may hold more than one non-FIFA nationality.

No.	Pos.	Nation	Player
10	MF	CRO	Danijel Pranjić (To FC Bayern Munich)
11	MF	NOR	André Hanssen (released)
24	GK	RSA	Hans Vonk (To Ajax Cape Town)
27	GK	IRI	Agil Etemadi (On loan to FC Emmen)
29	FW	NED	Donovan Deekman (To SC Lokeren)
36	DF	DEN	Timmi Johansen (To Odense BK)
37	MF	NED	Xander Houtkoop (On loan to FC Emmen)
39	MF	NED	Michel Poldervaart (On loan to FC Emmen)
40	DF	HAI	Lesley Fellinga (To FC Toronto)
44	FW	POL	Paweł Wojciechowski (On loan to FC Emmen)
-	DF	NED	Jeroen Drost (To Vitesse Arnhem)
-	FW	NED	Reza Ghoochannejhad (released)

=== Heracles Almelo ===
In: Note: Flags indicate national team as defined under FIFA eligibility rules; some limited exceptions apply. Players may hold more than one non-FIFA nationality.

No.	Pos.	Nation	Player
4	DF	NED	Antoine van der Linden (From (Portugal) C.S. Marítimo)
6	MF	NED	Resit Schuurman (From De Graafschap)
14	MF	GER	Elias Pech (From (Germany) Hertha BSC)
15	DF	NED	Peter Reekers (From VVV-Venlo)

Out: Note: Flags indicate national team as defined under FIFA eligibility rules; some limited exceptions apply. Players may hold more than one non-FIFA nationality.

No.	Pos.	Nation	Player
2	DF	GHA	Emmanuel Boakye (To Sparta)
4	DF	BEL	Jan Wuytens (To FC Utrecht)
6	MF	CZE	Lukáš Bajer (Loan return to (Czech Republic) SK Sigma Olomouc)
7	MF	NED	Remon de Vries (released)
10	MF	NED	Ricky van den Bergh (To ADO Den Haag)
14	DF	NED	Marnix Smit (To SVZW)
15	DF	POL	Bartek Pacuszka (Loan return to FC Twente)
18	FW	NED	Karim Bridji (released)

=== NAC Breda ===
In: Note: Flags indicate national team as defined under FIFA eligibility rules; some limited exceptions apply. Players may hold more than one non-FIFA nationality.

No.	Pos.	Nation	Player
23	DF	NED	Robbert Schilder (From Ajax)
24	FW	NED	Rogier Veenstra (Loan return from HFC Haarlem)
29	DF	NED	Ferne Snoyl (From RKC Waalwijk)

Out: Note: Flags indicate national team as defined under FIFA eligibility rules; some limited exceptions apply. Players may hold more than one non-FIFA nationality.

No.	Pos.	Nation	Player
19	DF	DEN	Patrick Mtiliga (To Málaga CF)
23	MF	MAR	Nourdin Boukhari (released)
24	DF	NED	Wesley Pollemans (To RBC Roosendaal)
29	FW	NED	Michiel Kramer (To FC Volendam)

=== NEC ===
In: Note: Flags indicate national team as defined under FIFA eligibility rules; some limited exceptions apply. Players may hold more than one non-FIFA nationality.

No.	Pos.	Nation	Player
3	DF	NED	Rens van Eijden (From PSV)
11	FW	SWE	Erton Fejzullahu (From Mjällby AIF)
14	FW	NED	Ricky ten Voorde (From FC Emmen)
15	DF	NED	Niels Wellenberg (From FC Twente)
18	FW	BEL	Bjorn Vleminckx (From (Belgium) KV Mechelen)

Out: Note: Flags indicate national team as defined under FIFA eligibility rules; some limited exceptions apply. Players may hold more than one non-FIFA nationality.

No.	Pos.	Nation	Player
3	DF	NED	Milano Koenders (Loan return to AZ)
11	FW	DEN	Dennis Rommedahl (Loan return to AFC Ajax)
14	FW	NED	Rachid Bouaouzan (Loan return to Wigan Athletic FC)
17	FW	NED	Collins John (Loan return to Fulham FC)
19	FW	NED	Tim Janssen (To (Denmark) Esbjerg fB)
21	DF	ESP	Dani Fernandez (To Feyenoord, was on loan from (Ukraine) FC Metalurh Donetsk)
—	FW	NED	Karim Fachtali (To FC Oss)

=== PSV ===
In: Note: Flags indicate national team as defined under FIFA eligibility rules; some limited exceptions apply. Players may hold more than one non-FIFA nationality.

No.	Pos.	Nation	Player
15	MF	BEL	Stijn Wuytens (Loan return from De Graafschap)
17	FW	PER	Reimond Manco (Loan return from Willem II)
18	MF	NED	Orlando Engelaar (From (Germany) Schalke 04)
23	DF	NED	André Ooijer (From (England) Blackburn Rovers)
31	GK	BRA	Cássio Ramos (Loan return from Sparta Rotterdam)
-	FW	NED	Género Zeefuik (Loan return from FC Omniworld)
25	DF	BUL	Stanislav Manolev (From (Bulgaria) Litex Lovech)

Out: Note: Flags indicate national team as defined under FIFA eligibility rules; some limited exceptions apply. Players may hold more than one non-FIFA nationality.

No.	Pos.	Nation	Player
13	DF	FRA	Jérémie Bréchet (To FC Sochaux)
15	MF	AUS	Jason Čulina (To Gold Coast United)
-	FW	NED	Género Zeefuik (On loan to FC Dordrecht)
3	DF	NED	Mike Zonneveld (On loan to FC Groningen)
8	MF	ECU	Edison Mendez (To LDU Quito)

=== RKC Waalwijk ===
In: Note: Flags indicate national team as defined under FIFA eligibility rules; some limited exceptions apply. Players may hold more than one non-FIFA nationality.

No.	Pos.	Nation	Player
-	FW	NED	Derk Boerrigter (From FC Zwolle)
-	GK	ISR	Ohad Levita (From Hapoel Kfar Saba)

Out: Note: Flags indicate national team as defined under FIFA eligibility rules; some limited exceptions apply. Players may hold more than one non-FIFA nationality.

No.	Pos.	Nation	Player
-	DF	NED	Humphrey Rudge (retired)
-	MF	NED	Jerge Hoefdraad (To FC Omniworld)
-	FW	NED	Jordy Brouwer (Loan return to Liverpool F.C.)
-	FW	NED	Johan Voskamp (Loan return to SBV Excelsior)
-	FW	BEL	Luwamo Garcia (released)
-	GK	NED	Theo Zwarthoed (To FC Volendam)
-	DF	NED	Ferne Snoyl (To NAC Breda)

=== Roda JC ===
In: Note: Flags indicate national team as defined under FIFA eligibility rules; some limited exceptions apply. Players may hold more than one non-FIFA nationality.

No.	Pos.	Nation	Player
9	FW	DEN	Mads Junker (On loan from Vitesse Arnhem)
11	FW	DEN	Morten Skoubo (On loan from FC Utrecht)
14	FW	NED	Rihairo Meulens (From Vitesse Arnhem)
20	DF	NED	Jan-Paul Saeijs (Loan return from (England) Southampton F.C.)
24	FW	NED	Harrie Gommans (Loan return from (Belgium) SV Roeselare)

Out: Note: Flags indicate national team as defined under FIFA eligibility rules; some limited exceptions apply. Players may hold more than one non-FIFA nationality.

No.	Pos.	Nation	Player
6	MF	NED	Marcel Meeuwis (To (Germany) Borussia Mönchengladbach)
11	FW	EST	Andres Oper (To (China) Shanghai Shenhua)
19	FW	CIV	Sekou Cissé (To Feyenoord)
20	FW	NED	Wesley Schors (To MVV)
23	FW	NED	Dieter van Tornhout (To (Cyprus) Enosis Neon Paralimni)

=== Sparta Rotterdam ===
In: Note: Flags indicate national team as defined under FIFA eligibility rules; some limited exceptions apply. Players may hold more than one non-FIFA nationality.

No.	Pos.	Nation	Player
1	GK	SLO	Aleksander Šeliga (From (Slovenia) NK Celje)
2	DF	GHA	Emmanuel Boakye (From Heracles Almelo)
8	DF	NED	Donovan Slijngard (From Ajax, previously on loan)
23	DF	NED	Tim Bakens (From FC Volendam)
-	DF	BEL	Jesse Mayele (From Fortuna Sittard)

Out: Note: Flags indicate national team as defined under FIFA eligibility rules; some limited exceptions apply. Players may hold more than one non-FIFA nationality.

No.	Pos.	Nation	Player
1	GK	NED	Harald Wapenaar (released)
2	DF	HUN	Krisztián Vermes (Loan return to (Hungary) Újpest FC)
15	DF	SUI	Kim Jaggy (released)
20	DF	NED	Cees Toet (To RBC Roosendaal, previously out on loan)
22	DF	NED	Jerold Promes (released)
23	MF	NED	Iderlindo Moreno Freire (released)
26	MF	BEL	Floribert N'Galula (released)
34	MF	NED	Marvin van der Pluijm (To FC Den Bosch)
35	DF	POL	Maciej Wilusz (released)
38	MF	NED	Jeffrey Rijsdijk (To FC Groningen)

=== FC Twente ===
In: Note: Flags indicate national team as defined under FIFA eligibility rules; some limited exceptions apply. Players may hold more than one non-FIFA nationality.

No.	Pos.	Nation	Player
3	DF	NED	Nicky Kuiper (From Vitesse Arnhem)
14	FW	RSA	Bernard Parker (From (South Africa) Thanda Royal Zulu)
15	FW	SVK	Miroslav Stoch (On loan from (England) Chelsea FC)
20	FW	NED	Luuk de Jong (From De Graafschap)
22	FW	CRC	Bryan Ruiz (From (Belgium) AA Gent)
23	MF	IRQ	Nashat Akram (From (Qatar) Al-Gharafa)
28	FW	GHA	Ransford Osei (On loan from (Israel) Maccabi Haifa)
-	DF	POL	Bartek Pacuszka (Loan return from Heracles Almelo)

Out: Note: Flags indicate national team as defined under FIFA eligibility rules; some limited exceptions apply. Players may hold more than one non-FIFA nationality.

No.	Pos.	Nation	Player
3	DF	NED	Edson Braafheid (To (Germany) FC Bayern Munich)
15	FW	NED	Eljero Elia (To (Germany) Hamburger SV)
22	DF	NED	Niels Wellenberg (To NEC)
23	FW	NED	Patrick Gerritsen (On loan to Go Ahead Eagles)

=== FC Utrecht ===
In: Note: Flags indicate national team as defined under FIFA eligibility rules; some limited exceptions apply. Players may hold more than one non-FIFA nationality.

No.	Pos.	Nation	Player
9	FW	NED	Ricky van Wolfswinkel (From Vitesse Arnhem)
11	MF	BEL	Dries Mertens (From AGOVV)
12	FW	BEL	Kevin Vandenbergh (Loan return from (Belgium) Germinal Beerschot)
15	MF	GHA	Nana Asare (From (Belgium) KV Mechelen)
19	GK	MAR	Khalid Sinouh (From (Germany) Hamburger SV)
24	FW	ZAM	Jacob Mulenga (From (France) Châteauroux)
29	DF	BEL	Jan Wuytens (From Heracles Almelo)
36	MF	CAN	Jacob Lensky (free agent)

Out: Note: Flags indicate national team as defined under FIFA eligibility rules; some limited exceptions apply. Players may hold more than one non-FIFA nationality.

No.	Pos.	Nation	Player
10	MF	BEL	Tom Caluwé (To Al-Wakrah Sports Club)
14	MF	GER	Simon Cziommer (Loan return to AZ)
15	DF	NED	Kees van Buuren (To FC Den Bosch)
19	FW	MAR	Ali Boussaboun (To Al-Nassr)
51	FW	NED	Rafael Uiterloo (On loan to FC Omniworld)

=== Vitesse ===
In: Note: Flags indicate national team as defined under FIFA eligibility rules; some limited exceptions apply. Players may hold more than one non-FIFA nationality.

No.	Pos.	Nation	Player
9	FW	SWE	Lasse Nilsson (From (France) Saint-Étienne, previously on loan)
11	FW	TUR	Sinan Kaloglu (from (Germany) VfL Bochum)
20	MF	NED	Nicky Hofs (From Feyenoord)
-	DF	ISR	Haim Megrelishvili (Loan return from (Israel) Maccabi Tel Aviv)
-	MF	NED	Wilco den Hartog (From GVVV)

Out: Note: Flags indicate national team as defined under FIFA eligibility rules; some limited exceptions apply. Players may hold more than one non-FIFA nationality.

No.	Pos.	Nation	Player
3	DF	FRA	Sébastien Sansoni (released)
9	FW	DEN	Mads Junker (On loan to Roda JC)
17	FW	NED	Ricky van Wolfswinkel (To FC Utrecht)
25	DF	NED	Nicky Kuiper (To FC Twente)
29	FW	NED	Rihairo Meulens (To Roda JC)
30	MF	NED	Nicky Hofs (Loan return to Feyenoord)

=== VVV Venlo ===
In: Note: Flags indicate national team as defined under FIFA eligibility rules; some limited exceptions apply. Players may hold more than one non-FIFA nationality.

No.	Pos.	Nation	Player
1	GK	NED	Dennis Gentenaar (From Ajax)
15	FW	MAR	Achmed Ahahaoui (From Go Ahead Eagles)
20	FW	NED	Ruud Boymans (From Fortuna Sittard)
21	FW	POR	Diogo Viana (On loan from (Portugal) FC Porto)
27	DF	NED	Patrick Paauwe (From (Germany) Borussia Mönchengladbach)

Out: Note: Flags indicate national team as defined under FIFA eligibility rules; some limited exceptions apply. Players may hold more than one non-FIFA nationality.

No.	Pos.	Nation	Player
—	DF	NED	Peter Reekers (To Heracles Almelo)
—	FW	NED	Samir El Gaaouiri (To KSV Roeselare)
—	GK	NED	Danny Wintjens (To Fortuna Sittard)

=== Willem II ===
In: Note: Flags indicate national team as defined under FIFA eligibility rules; some limited exceptions apply. Players may hold more than one non-FIFA nationality.

No.	Pos.	Nation	Player
8	MF	BEL	Christophe Grégoire (Loan return from (Belgium) R. Charleroi S.C.)
16	GK	FIN	Niki Mäenpää (From FC Den Bosch)
20	MF	NED	Jasper Waalkens (From PSV)

Out: Note: Flags indicate national team as defined under FIFA eligibility rules; some limited exceptions apply. Players may hold more than one non-FIFA nationality.

No.	Pos.	Nation	Player
6	MF	NED	Danny Mathijssen (released)
14	MF	BEL	Mohamed Messoudi (To KV Kortrijk)
15	DF	NED	Rens van Eijden (To NEC, was on loan from PSV)
20	MF	NED	Niels Vorthoren (To FC Den Bosch)
23	MF	NED	Steef Nieuwendaal (To FC Den Bosch)
24	DF	NED	Angelo Martha (released)
26	GK	BEL	Bruno Appels (To FC Den Bosch)
27	FW	PER	Reimond Manco (Loan return to PSV)

== Eerste Divisie ==
=== AGOVV Apeldoorn ===
In: Note: Flags indicate national team as defined under FIFA eligibility rules; some limited exceptions apply. Players may hold more than one non-FIFA nationality.

No.	Pos.	Nation	Player
—	GK	NED	Jeroen van Binsbergen (From Willem II)
—	MF	NED	Arnoud van Toor (From FC Omniworld)
—	MF	PHI	Paul Mulders (From FC Omniworld)
—	MF	MAR	Mo Benlahcen (From A.V.V. Zeeburgia)

Out: Note: Flags indicate national team as defined under FIFA eligibility rules; some limited exceptions apply. Players may hold more than one non-FIFA nationality.

No.	Pos.	Nation	Player
13	MF	BEL	Dries Mertens (To FC Utrecht)
15	DF	ANT	Timothy Cathalina (To FC Emmen)
20	FW	MKD	Denis Mahmudov (To WHC)

=== SC Cambuur ===
In: Note: Flags indicate national team as defined under FIFA eligibility rules; some limited exceptions apply. Players may hold more than one non-FIFA nationality.

No.	Pos.	Nation	Player
—	DF	NED	Léon Hese (From De Graafschap)
—	MF	NED	Robert van Boxel (From MVV)
—	MF	NED	Dave Huymans (From FC Zwolle)
—	MF	NED	Oguzhan Türk (From SC Heerenveen, was on loan to Go Ahead Eagles)
—	FW	FRA	Kévin Diaz (From FC Eindhoven)
—	FW	NED	Rence van der Wal (From Go Ahead Eagles)

Out: Note: Flags indicate national team as defined under FIFA eligibility rules; some limited exceptions apply. Players may hold more than one non-FIFA nationality.

No.	Pos.	Nation	Player
1	GK	NED	Peter van der Vlag (To BV Veendam)
5	DF	NED	Michael Jansen (To FC Groningen)
19	MF	NED	Anco Jansen (To HHC Hardenberg)

=== FC Den Bosch ===
In: Note: Flags indicate national team as defined under FIFA eligibility rules; some limited exceptions apply. Players may hold more than one non-FIFA nationality.

No.	Pos.	Nation	Player
—	GK	BEL	Bruno Appels (From Willem II)
—	GK	NED	Bart Tinus (From OJC Rosmalen)
—	DF	NED	Kees van Buuren (From FC Utrecht)
—	DF	NED	Samir El Moussaoui (From ADO Den Haag)
—	DF	NED	Benny Kerstens (From RBC Roosendaal)
—	MF	NED	Steef Nieuwendaal (From Willem II)
—	MF	NED	Niels Vorthoren (From Willem II)
—	MF	NED	Marvin van der Pluijm (From Sparta)
—	FW	BEL	Fabio Caracciolo (On loan from ADO Den Haag)

Out: Note: Flags indicate national team as defined under FIFA eligibility rules; some limited exceptions apply. Players may hold more than one non-FIFA nationality.

No.	Pos.	Nation	Player
1	GK	FIN	Niki Mäenpää (To Willem II)
10	MF	NED	Ivo Rossen (To FC Eindhoven)

=== FC Dordrecht ===
In: Note: Flags indicate national team as defined under FIFA eligibility rules; some limited exceptions apply. Players may hold more than one non-FIFA nationality.

No.	Pos.	Nation	Player
—	DF	NED	Nick Kuipers (From FC Utrecht, was on loan to FC Zwolle)
—	MF	BEL	Sven Delanoy (From RBC Roosendaal)

Out: Note: Flags indicate national team as defined under FIFA eligibility rules; some limited exceptions apply. Players may hold more than one non-FIFA nationality.

No.	Pos.	Nation	Player
—	GK	NED	Sjoerd Rensen (To IJsselmeervogels, was on loan to FC Eindhoven)
—	MF	NED	John van Loenhout (To FC Lienden)

=== FC Eindhoven ===
In: Note: Flags indicate national team as defined under FIFA eligibility rules; some limited exceptions apply. Players may hold more than one non-FIFA nationality.

No.	Pos.	Nation	Player
—	MF	NED	Ivo Rossen (From FC Den Bosch)

Out: Note: Flags indicate national team as defined under FIFA eligibility rules; some limited exceptions apply. Players may hold more than one non-FIFA nationality.

No.	Pos.	Nation	Player
—	GK	NED	Sjoerd Rensen (To IJsselmeervogels, was on loan from FC Dordrecht)
—	FW	FRA	Kévin Diaz (To SC Cambuur)
—	FW	NED	Serhat Koç (To FC Groningen)
-	DF	ECU	José Valencia Murillo (To Wuppertaler SV Borussia)

=== FC Emmen ===
In: Note: Flags indicate national team as defined under FIFA eligibility rules; some limited exceptions apply. Players may hold more than one non-FIFA nationality.

No.	Pos.	Nation	Player
—	DF	ANT	Timothy Cathalina (From AGOVV)
—	MF	NED	Xander Houtkoop (On loan from SC Heerenveen)
—	MF	NED	Richard Stolte (On loan from SC Heerenveen)
—	MF	NED	Michel Poldervaart (On loan from SC Heerenveen)
—	MF	ISL	Björn Jónsson (On loan from SC Heerenveen)
—	FW	POL	Paweł Wojciechowski (On loan from SC Heerenveen)

Out: Note: Flags indicate national team as defined under FIFA eligibility rules; some limited exceptions apply. Players may hold more than one non-FIFA nationality.

No.	Pos.	Nation	Player
2	DF	NED	Mark Bevaart (To FC Omniworld)
9	FW	NED	Ricky ten Voorde (To NEC)

=== Excelsior ===
In: Note: Flags indicate national team as defined under FIFA eligibility rules; some limited exceptions apply. Players may hold more than one non-FIFA nationality.

No.	Pos.	Nation	Player

Out: Note: Flags indicate national team as defined under FIFA eligibility rules; some limited exceptions apply. Players may hold more than one non-FIFA nationality.

No.	Pos.	Nation	Player
—	FW	NED	Tjeerd Korf (To BV Veendam)
-	MF	NED	Robert Braber (to (Germany) FC Ingolstadt 04)

=== Fortuna Sittard ===
In: Note: Flags indicate national team as defined under FIFA eligibility rules; some limited exceptions apply. Players may hold more than one non-FIFA nationality.

No.	Pos.	Nation	Player

Out: Note: Flags indicate national team as defined under FIFA eligibility rules; some limited exceptions apply. Players may hold more than one non-FIFA nationality.

No.	Pos.	Nation	Player
—	MF	NED	Bryan Linssen (To MVV)
—	FW	NED	Danny Schreurs (To FC Zwolle)
—	FW	NED	Ruud Boymans (To VVV-Venlo)

=== Go Ahead Eagles ===
In: Note: Flags indicate national team as defined under FIFA eligibility rules; some limited exceptions apply. Players may hold more than one non-FIFA nationality.

No.	Pos.	Nation	Player
—	DF	NED	Dennis Hollart (From FC Omniworld)
—	MF	NED	Glenn Kobussen (From Feyenoord)
—	FW	NED	Jules Reimerink (On loan from FC Twente, previously on loan)
—	FW	EST	Sander Post (On loan from (Estonia) FC Flora, previously on loan)

Out: Note: Flags indicate national team as defined under FIFA eligibility rules; some limited exceptions apply. Players may hold more than one non-FIFA nationality.

No.	Pos.	Nation	Player
—	DF	NED	Luuk te Boekhorst (To WHC)
—	MF	NED	Oguzhan Türk (To SC Cambuur, was on loan from SC Heerenveen)
—	FW	NED	Achmed Ahahaoui (To VVV-Venlo)
—	FW	NED	Rence van der Wal (To SC Cambuur)

=== De Graafschap ===
In: Note: Flags indicate national team as defined under FIFA eligibility rules; some limited exceptions apply. Players may hold more than one non-FIFA nationality.

No.	Pos.	Nation	Player

Out: Note: Flags indicate national team as defined under FIFA eligibility rules; some limited exceptions apply. Players may hold more than one non-FIFA nationality.

No.	Pos.	Nation	Player
—	DF	NED	Léon Hese (To SC Cambuur)
—	MF	NED	Resit Schuurman (To Heracles Almelo)
—	MF	BEL	Stijn Wuytens (Loan return to PSV)
—	FW	NED	Luuk de Jong (To FC Twente)
—	FW	NED	Melvin Kolf (To FC Oss)

=== HFC Haarlem ===
In: Note: Flags indicate national team as defined under FIFA eligibility rules; some limited exceptions apply. Players may hold more than one non-FIFA nationality.

No.	Pos.	Nation	Player
—	DF	NED	Calvin Mac Intosch (From Ajax)
—	DF	NED	Geoffrey Meye (From Telstar)
—	MF	NED	Jordi Schell (On loan from Ajax)
—	FW	NED	Roel de Graaff (From FC Zwolle)

Out: Note: Flags indicate national team as defined under FIFA eligibility rules; some limited exceptions apply. Players may hold more than one non-FIFA nationality.

No.	Pos.	Nation	Player
—	DF	NED	Mark Rutgers (To (Iceland) KR Reykjavík)
—	MF	NED	Danny Post (To FC Groningen)
—	FW	TUR	Ferdi Somnez (To FC Lisse)

=== Helmond Sport ===
In: Note: Flags indicate national team as defined under FIFA eligibility rules; some limited exceptions apply. Players may hold more than one non-FIFA nationality.

No.	Pos.	Nation	Player
—	DF	NED	Jeroen Veldmate (On loan from FC Groningen)
—	FW	NED	Mark Veldmate (From BV Veendam)

Out: Note: Flags indicate national team as defined under FIFA eligibility rules; some limited exceptions apply. Players may hold more than one non-FIFA nationality.

No.	Pos.	Nation	Player

=== MVV ===
In: Note: Flags indicate national team as defined under FIFA eligibility rules; some limited exceptions apply. Players may hold more than one non-FIFA nationality.

No.	Pos.	Nation	Player
—	MF	NED	Bryan Linssen (From Fortuna Sittard)
—	FW	NED	Wesley Schors (From Roda JC)

Out: Note: Flags indicate national team as defined under FIFA eligibility rules; some limited exceptions apply. Players may hold more than one non-FIFA nationality.

No.	Pos.	Nation	Player
4	MF	NED	Robert van Boxel (To SC Cambuur)
—	DF	NED	Dustin Huisman (To Quick Boys)

=== FC Omniworld ===
In: Note: Flags indicate national team as defined under FIFA eligibility rules; some limited exceptions apply. Players may hold more than one non-FIFA nationality.

No.	Pos.	Nation	Player
—	DF	NED	Mark Bevaart (From FC Emmen)
—	DF	NED	Edwin Dekkers (From Telstar)
—	DF	NED	Cendrino Misidjan (From Telstar)
—	DF	NED	Richard van Heulen (From Telstar)
—	MF	NED	Marien Willemsen (From Telstar)
—	MF	NED	Jergé Hoefdraad (From RKC Waalwijk)
—	FW	NED	Marvin Hasselbaink (From Ajax)

Out: Note: Flags indicate national team as defined under FIFA eligibility rules; some limited exceptions apply. Players may hold more than one non-FIFA nationality.

No.	Pos.	Nation	Player
—	GK	NED	Mark Zegers (To Barendrecht)
—	DF	NED	Bas van den Brink (To (Australia) Gold Coast United)
—	DF	NED	Dennis Hollart (To Go Ahead Eagles)
—	MF	NED	Arnoud van Toor (To AGOVV)
—	MF	PHI	Paul Mulders (To AGOVV)
—	FW	SUI	Milos Malenović (released)

=== RBC Roosendaal ===
In: Note: Flags indicate national team as defined under FIFA eligibility rules; some limited exceptions apply. Players may hold more than one non-FIFA nationality.

No.	Pos.	Nation	Player
—	GK	NED	Melvin Koetsier (From FC Twente)
—	DF	NED	Wesley Pollemans (From NAC Breda)
—	DF	NED	Cees Toet (From Sparta, previously on loan)
—	MF	NED	Joran Pot (From FC Twente)
—	MF	NED	Marc Corman (From Willem II)
—	MF	NED	Felino Jardim (From (England) Cambridge United)
—	FW	NED	Gregory Nelson (From AZ, previously on loan)

Out: Note: Flags indicate national team as defined under FIFA eligibility rules; some limited exceptions apply. Players may hold more than one non-FIFA nationality.

No.	Pos.	Nation	Player
4	DF	NED	Benny Kerstens (To FC Den Bosch)
6	MF	BEL	Sven Delanoy (To FC Dordrecht)

=== Telstar ===
In: Note: Flags indicate national team as defined under FIFA eligibility rules; some limited exceptions apply. Players may hold more than one non-FIFA nationality.

No.	Pos.	Nation	Player
—	DF	NED	Robert Schutz (From AZ)
—	MF	NED	Arvid Smit (From FC Volendam)
—	FW	NED	Furdjel Narsingh (From AZ, was on loan to FC Volendam)

Out: Note: Flags indicate national team as defined under FIFA eligibility rules; some limited exceptions apply. Players may hold more than one non-FIFA nationality.

No.	Pos.	Nation	Player
3	DF	NED	Tom Zoontjes (To FC Lisse)
4	DF	NED	Geoffrey Meye (To HFC Haarlem)
6	MF	NED	Misha Salden (retired)
13	DF	NED	Richard van Heulen (To FC Omniworld)
16	GK	NED	Mark de Vries (To FC Lisse)
17	MF	NED	Marien Willemsen (To FC Omniworld)
18	MF	NED	Mohammed Messaoud (To FC Lisse)
19	FW	NED	Bob Koning (To VV Katwijk)
21	FW	NED	Jeffrey Esser (To Hollandia)
25	DF	NED	Cendrino Misidjan (To FC Omniworld)
32	DF	NED	Edwin Dekkers (To FC Omniworld)

=== FC Oss ===
In: Note: Flags indicate national team as defined under FIFA eligibility rules; some limited exceptions apply. Players may hold more than one non-FIFA nationality.

No.	Pos.	Nation	Player
—	MF	NED	Dominique Scholten (From NEC, previously on loan)
—	FW	NED	Karim Fachtali (From NEC, previously on loan)
—	FW	NED	Melvin Kolf (From De Graafschap)

Out: Note: Flags indicate national team as defined under FIFA eligibility rules; some limited exceptions apply. Players may hold more than one non-FIFA nationality.

No.	Pos.	Nation	Player

=== BV Veendam ===
In: Note: Flags indicate national team as defined under FIFA eligibility rules; some limited exceptions apply. Players may hold more than one non-FIFA nationality.

No.	Pos.	Nation	Player
—	GK	NED	Peter van der Vlag (From SC Cambuur)
—	DF	NED	Mitch Apau (From Ajax)
—	MF	NED	Paul Matthijs (From FC Groningen)
—	MF	NED	Lars Lambooij (From Willem II)
—	MF	NED	Michael de Leeuw (From Willem II)
—	FW	NED	Joël Bijlow (From Feyenoord)
—	FW	NED	Tjeerd Korf (From Excelsior)
—	FW	NED	René Wessels (From (Germany) SV Meppen)

Out: Note: Flags indicate national team as defined under FIFA eligibility rules; some limited exceptions apply. Players may hold more than one non-FIFA nationality.

No.	Pos.	Nation	Player
—	GK	NED	Barry Ditewig (To Sneek Wit Zwart)
—	MF	NED	Sjaak Polak (released)
—	MF	NED	Elwin Kloosterman (To Sneek Wit Zwart)
—	FW	BDI	Kassim Bizimana (To Sneek Wit Zwart)
—	FW	NED	Mark Veldmate (To Helmond Sport)

=== FC Volendam ===
In: Note: Flags indicate national team as defined under FIFA eligibility rules; some limited exceptions apply. Players may hold more than one non-FIFA nationality.

No.	Pos.	Nation	Player
—	FW	NED	Michiel Kramer (From NAC Breda)

Out: Note: Flags indicate national team as defined under FIFA eligibility rules; some limited exceptions apply. Players may hold more than one non-FIFA nationality.

No.	Pos.	Nation	Player
—	DF	NED	Gerry Koning (To SC Heerenveen)
—	DF	NED	Tim Bakens (To Sparta)
—	MF	NED	Arvid Smit (To Telstar)
—	FW	NED	Furdjel Narsingh (To Telstar, was on loan from AZ)
—	FW	NED	Bas Ent (To VV Katwijk)

=== FC Zwolle ===
In: Note: Flags indicate national team as defined under FIFA eligibility rules; some limited exceptions apply. Players may hold more than one non-FIFA nationality.

No.	Pos.	Nation	Player
—	MF	NED	Cees Keizer (From Vitesse Arnhem, previously on loan)
—	FW	NED	Danny Schreurs (From Fortuna Sittard)

Out: Note: Flags indicate national team as defined under FIFA eligibility rules; some limited exceptions apply. Players may hold more than one non-FIFA nationality.

No.	Pos.	Nation	Player
—	DF	NED	Nick Kuipers (To FC Dordrecht, was on loan from FC Utrecht)
—	MF	NED	Dave Huymans (To SC Cambuur)
—	FW	NED	Roel de Graaff (To HFC Haarlem)

== See also ==
- Football in the Netherlands
- Transfer window
- List of Dutch football transfers summer 2010–11
