= List of Dutch football transfers winter 2008–09 =

This is a list of transfers in Dutch football for the 2009 Winter transfer window. Only moves featuring an Eredivisie side and/or an Eerste Divisie side are listed.

The winter transfer window opened on January 1, 2009, and closed on February 2. Deals may be signed at any given moment in the season, but the actual transfer may only take place during the transfer window. Unattached players may sign at any moment.

== Eredivisie ==
=== ADO Den Haag ===
In: Note: Flags indicate national team as defined under FIFA eligibility rules; some limited exceptions apply. Players may hold more than one non-FIFA nationality.

No.	Pos.	Nation	Player
16	FW	NED	Berry Powel (From FC Groningen)
17	DF	BEL	Timothy Derijck (From Feyenoord)
25	MF	NED	Danny Buijs (From Feyenoord)

Out: Note: Flags indicate national team as defined under FIFA eligibility rules; some limited exceptions apply. Players may hold more than one non-FIFA nationality.

No.	Pos.	Nation	Player
14	MF	NED	Levi Schwiebbe (On loan to Haarlem)
17	FW	NED	Hursut Meric (To (Turkey) Gençlerbirliği)
--	FW	NED	Guyon Fernandez (To Excelsior)

=== Ajax ===
In: Note: Flags indicate national team as defined under FIFA eligibility rules; some limited exceptions apply. Players may hold more than one non-FIFA nationality.

No.	Pos.	Nation	Player
17	DF	NED	Rob Wielaert (From FC Twente)

Out: Note: Flags indicate national team as defined under FIFA eligibility rules; some limited exceptions apply. Players may hold more than one non-FIFA nationality.

No.	Pos.	Nation	Player
9	FW	NED	Klaas-Jan Huntelaar (To (Spain) Real Madrid)
19	FW	DEN	Dennis Rommedahl (On loan to NEC)
27	MF	BEL	Laurent Delorge (To Roda JC)
31	GK	RSA	Hans Vonk (To SC Heerenveen)
35	MF	NED	John Goossens (To NEC)
56	FW	NED	Renaldo Jongebloet (On loan to Haarlem)
58	FW	RSA	Stanton Lewis (On loan to (South Africa) Ajax Cape Town)

=== AZ ===
In: Note: Flags indicate national team as defined under FIFA eligibility rules; some limited exceptions apply. Players may hold more than one non-FIFA nationality.

No.	Pos.	Nation	Player
14	DF	EST	Ragnar Klavan (From Heracles Almelo)
--	MF	AUS	James Holland (From (Australia) Newcastle Jets)
--	FW	ISL	Jóhann Berg Guðmundsson (From (Iceland) Breiðablik)

Out: Note: Flags indicate national team as defined under FIFA eligibility rules; some limited exceptions apply. Players may hold more than one non-FIFA nationality.

No.	Pos.	Nation	Player
12	DF	NED	Milano Koenders (On loan to NEC)
33	FW	NED	Gregory Nelson (On loan to RBC Roosendaal)
--	MF	NED	Gaston Salasiwa (On loan to Telstar)
--	FW	NED	Chevello de Rijp (On loan to Telstar)

=== Feyenoord ===
In: Note: Flags indicate national team as defined under FIFA eligibility rules; some limited exceptions apply. Players may hold more than one non-FIFA nationality.

No.	Pos.	Nation	Player

Out: Note: Flags indicate national team as defined under FIFA eligibility rules; some limited exceptions apply. Players may hold more than one non-FIFA nationality.

No.	Pos.	Nation	Player
23	MF	NED	Danny Buijs (To ADO Den Haag)
53	DF	BEL	Timothy Derijck (To ADO Den Haag)
--	MF	NED	Timon van Leeuwen (To Go Ahead Eagles)

=== De Graafschap ===
In: Note: Flags indicate national team as defined under FIFA eligibility rules; some limited exceptions apply. Players may hold more than one non-FIFA nationality.

No.	Pos.	Nation	Player
--	DF	NED	Muslu Nalbantoğlu (Free agent)
--	DF	NED	Henrico Drost (On loan from SC Heerenveen)
--	MF	BEL	Stijn Wuytens (On loan from PSV)
--	FW	ISR	Ben Sahar (On loan from (England) Chelsea FC)

Out: Note: Flags indicate national team as defined under FIFA eligibility rules; some limited exceptions apply. Players may hold more than one non-FIFA nationality.

No.	Pos.	Nation	Player
--	GK	NED	Stefan Postma (To (Cyprus) Ermis Aradippou)
--	FW	NED	Donny de Groot (To (Australia) Newcastle Jets)
--	FW	ARG	Hugo Bargas (On loan to FC Zwolle)

=== FC Groningen ===
In: Note: Flags indicate national team as defined under FIFA eligibility rules; some limited exceptions apply. Players may hold more than one non-FIFA nationality.

No.	Pos.	Nation	Player
11	FW	SLO	Tim Matavž (Loan return from FC Emmen)
14	FW	DEN	Nicklas Pedersen (From (Denmark) FC Nordsjælland)

Out: Note: Flags indicate national team as defined under FIFA eligibility rules; some limited exceptions apply. Players may hold more than one non-FIFA nationality.

No.	Pos.	Nation	Player
4	DF	ARG	Matias Cahais (To (Argentina) Gimnasia y Esgrima)
11	FW	NED	Berry Powel (To ADO Den Haag)
--	FW	NED	Serdar Öztürk (On loan to BV Veendam)

=== SC Heerenveen ===
In: Note: Flags indicate national team as defined under FIFA eligibility rules; some limited exceptions apply. Players may hold more than one non-FIFA nationality.

No.	Pos.	Nation	Player
7	MF	SWE	Viktor Elm (From (Sweden) Kalmar FF)
14	FW	SWE	Patrik Ingelsten (From (Sweden) Kalmar FF)
24	GK	RSA	Hans Vonk (From Ajax)
--	MF	CRO	Mislav Radoš (From (Germany) SSV Ulm 1846)

Out: Note: Flags indicate national team as defined under FIFA eligibility rules; some limited exceptions apply. Players may hold more than one non-FIFA nationality.

No.	Pos.	Nation	Player
22	DF	NED	Henrico Drost (On loan to De Graafschap)
30	MF	NED	Reza Ghoochannejhad (On loan to FC Emmen)
32	DF	NED	Robin Huisman de Jong (On loan to FC Emmen)
--	FW	CPV	Cecilio Lopes (On loan to FC Dordrecht)

=== Heracles Almelo ===
In: Note: Flags indicate national team as defined under FIFA eligibility rules; some limited exceptions apply. Players may hold more than one non-FIFA nationality.

No.	Pos.	Nation	Player
15	DF	POL	Bartek Pacuszka (On loan from FC Twente)
19	FW	FIN	Juha Hakola (From (Estonia) Flora Tallinn)

Out: Note: Flags indicate national team as defined under FIFA eligibility rules; some limited exceptions apply. Players may hold more than one non-FIFA nationality.

No.	Pos.	Nation	Player
15	DF	EST	Ragnar Klavan (To AZ)

=== NAC Breda ===
In: Note: Flags indicate national team as defined under FIFA eligibility rules; some limited exceptions apply. Players may hold more than one non-FIFA nationality.

No.	Pos.	Nation	Player
23	FW	MAR	Nourdin Boukhari (Free agent)

Out: Note: Flags indicate national team as defined under FIFA eligibility rules; some limited exceptions apply. Players may hold more than one non-FIFA nationality.

No.	Pos.	Nation	Player
--	FW	NED	Rogier Veenstra (On loan to Haarlem)

=== NEC ===
In: Note: Flags indicate national team as defined under FIFA eligibility rules; some limited exceptions apply. Players may hold more than one non-FIFA nationality.

No.	Pos.	Nation	Player
3	DF	NED	Milano Koenders (On loan from AZ)
11	FW	DEN	Dennis Rommedahl (On loan from Ajax)
20	MF	NED	John Goossens (From Ajax)

Out: Note: Flags indicate national team as defined under FIFA eligibility rules; some limited exceptions apply. Players may hold more than one non-FIFA nationality.

No.	Pos.	Nation	Player
3	DF	NED	Peter Wisgerhof (To FC Twente)
27	MF	NED	Dominique Scholten (On loan to TOP Oss)

=== PSV ===
In: Note: Flags indicate national team as defined under FIFA eligibility rules; some limited exceptions apply. Players may hold more than one non-FIFA nationality.

No.	Pos.	Nation	Player
7	FW	SWE	Ola Toivonen (From Malmö FF)
19	MF	CHN	Zhou Haibin (From (China) Shandong Luneng)

Out: Note: Flags indicate national team as defined under FIFA eligibility rules; some limited exceptions apply. Players may hold more than one non-FIFA nationality.

No.	Pos.	Nation	Player
17	FW	PER	Reimond Manco (On loan to Willem II)
18	DF	GHA	Eric Addo (On loan to Roda JC)
19	FW	BRA	Jonathan Reis (On loan to (Brazil) Tupi FC)
29	FW	BEL	Stijn Wuytens (On loan to De Graafschap)
31	GK	BRA	Cássio Ramos (On loan to Sparta Rotterdam)

=== Roda JC ===
In: Note: Flags indicate national team as defined under FIFA eligibility rules; some limited exceptions apply. Players may hold more than one non-FIFA nationality.

No.	Pos.	Nation	Player
3	DF	GHA	Eric Addo (On loan from PSV)
18	MF	BEL	Arnaud Sutchuin (From (Belgium) Anderlecht)
26	MF	BEL	Laurent Delorge (From Ajax)
28	DF	BEL	Kris De Wree (From (Belgium) Germinal Beerschot)

Out: Note: Flags indicate national team as defined under FIFA eligibility rules; some limited exceptions apply. Players may hold more than one non-FIFA nationality.

No.	Pos.	Nation	Player
3	DF	NED	Jan-Paul Saeijs (On loan to (England) Southampton)
14	FW	NED	Harrie Gommans (On loan to (Belgium) KSV Roeselare)
23	DF	BEL	Mark De Man (To (Belgium) Germinal Beerschot)

=== Sparta Rotterdam ===
In: Note: Flags indicate national team as defined under FIFA eligibility rules; some limited exceptions apply. Players may hold more than one non-FIFA nationality.

No.	Pos.	Nation	Player
18	GK	BRA	Cássio Ramos (On loan from PSV)

Out: Note: Flags indicate national team as defined under FIFA eligibility rules; some limited exceptions apply. Players may hold more than one non-FIFA nationality.

No.	Pos.	Nation	Player
20	DF	NED	Cees Toet (On loan to RBC Roosendaal)
--	FW	NED	Jeffrey Vlug (On loan to RBC Roosendaal)
--	MF	POL	Maciej Wilusz (On loan to RBC Roosendaal)

=== FC Twente ===
In: Note: Flags indicate national team as defined under FIFA eligibility rules; some limited exceptions apply. Players may hold more than one non-FIFA nationality.

No.	Pos.	Nation	Player
4	DF	NED	Peter Wisgerhof (From NEC)
14	FW	AUS	Nikita Rukavytsya (From (Australia) Perth Glory)
--	MF	CZE	Martin Sus (From (Czech Republic) FC Brno)
--	MF	FIN	Petteri Pennanen (On loan from (Finland) KuPS)
--	FW	NOR	Flamur Kastrati (From (Norway) Skeid Fotball)

Out: Note: Flags indicate national team as defined under FIFA eligibility rules; some limited exceptions apply. Players may hold more than one non-FIFA nationality.

No.	Pos.	Nation	Player
2	DF	NED	Rob Wielaert (To Ajax)
11	FW	BEL	Stein Huysegems (To (Belgium) Racing Genk)
27	MF	MAR	Ibrahim Maaroufi (To (Italy) Vicenza)
31	MF	NED	Tjaronn Chery (On loan to SC Cambuur)
32	FW	NED	Jules Reimerink (On loan to Go Ahead Eagles)
--	DF	POL	Bartek Pacuszka (On loan to Heracles Almelo)

=== FC Utrecht ===
In: Note: Flags indicate national team as defined under FIFA eligibility rules; some limited exceptions apply. Players may hold more than one non-FIFA nationality.

No.	Pos.	Nation	Player
12	FW	NED	Frank van der Zwan (Loan return from Haarlem)

Out: Note: Flags indicate national team as defined under FIFA eligibility rules; some limited exceptions apply. Players may hold more than one non-FIFA nationality.

No.	Pos.	Nation	Player
12	DF	NED	Nick Kuipers (On loan to FC Zwolle)
33	FW	NED	Mohammed Faouzi (To Excelsior)

=== Vitesse Arnhem ===
In: Note: Flags indicate national team as defined under FIFA eligibility rules; some limited exceptions apply. Players may hold more than one non-FIFA nationality.

No.	Pos.	Nation	Player
16	MF	SLO	Dalibor Stevanovič (On loan from (Israel) Maccabi Petah Tikva)
20	FW	SWE	Lasse Nilsson (On loan from (France) AS Saint-Étienne)

Out: Note: Flags indicate national team as defined under FIFA eligibility rules; some limited exceptions apply. Players may hold more than one non-FIFA nationality.

No.	Pos.	Nation	Player
19	FW	FIN	Niklas Tarvajärvi (To (Switzerland) Neuchâtel Xamax)
20	MF	NED	Cees Keizer (On loan to FC Zwolle)
24	DF	ISR	Haim Megrelishvili (On loan to (Israel) Maccabi Tel Aviv)
26	DF	NED	Colin van Mourik (To JVC Cuijk)

=== FC Volendam ===
In: Note: Flags indicate national team as defined under FIFA eligibility rules; some limited exceptions apply. Players may hold more than one non-FIFA nationality.

No.	Pos.	Nation	Player

Out: Note: Flags indicate national team as defined under FIFA eligibility rules; some limited exceptions apply. Players may hold more than one non-FIFA nationality.

No.	Pos.	Nation	Player

=== Willem II ===
In: Note: Flags indicate national team as defined under FIFA eligibility rules; some limited exceptions apply. Players may hold more than one non-FIFA nationality.

No.	Pos.	Nation	Player
8	MF	NED	Kiki Musampa (Free agent)
25	DF	ANT	Nuelson Wau (Free agent)
27	FW	PER	Reimond Manco (On loan from PSV)

Out: Note: Flags indicate national team as defined under FIFA eligibility rules; some limited exceptions apply. Players may hold more than one non-FIFA nationality.

No.	Pos.	Nation	Player
8	MF	BEL	Christophe Grégoire (On loan to (Belgium) R. Charleroi S.C.)
--	GK	NED	Ariën Pietersma (On loan to RBC Roosendaal)

== Eerste Divisie ==
=== AGOVV Apeldoorn ===
In: Note: Flags indicate national team as defined under FIFA eligibility rules; some limited exceptions apply. Players may hold more than one non-FIFA nationality.

No.	Pos.	Nation	Player

Out: Note: Flags indicate national team as defined under FIFA eligibility rules; some limited exceptions apply. Players may hold more than one non-FIFA nationality.

No.	Pos.	Nation	Player

=== SC Cambuur ===
In: Note: Flags indicate national team as defined under FIFA eligibility rules; some limited exceptions apply. Players may hold more than one non-FIFA nationality.

No.	Pos.	Nation	Player
16	MF	NED	Tjaronn Chery (On loan from FC Twente)
26	DF	BEL	Pieter Collen (Free agent)
--	FW	NED	Jeffrey de Visscher (From (Scotland) Aberdeen)

Out: Note: Flags indicate national team as defined under FIFA eligibility rules; some limited exceptions apply. Players may hold more than one non-FIFA nationality.

No.	Pos.	Nation	Player
16	FW	ANT	Jurrick Juliana (To FC Dordrecht)
23	MF	CAN	Brandon Bonifacio (on loan to FC Zwolle)

=== FC Den Bosch ===
In: Note: Flags indicate national team as defined under FIFA eligibility rules; some limited exceptions apply. Players may hold more than one non-FIFA nationality.

No.	Pos.	Nation	Player

Out: Note: Flags indicate national team as defined under FIFA eligibility rules; some limited exceptions apply. Players may hold more than one non-FIFA nationality.

No.	Pos.	Nation	Player

=== FC Dordrecht ===
In: Note: Flags indicate national team as defined under FIFA eligibility rules; some limited exceptions apply. Players may hold more than one non-FIFA nationality.

No.	Pos.	Nation	Player
--	FW	ANT	Jurrick Juliana (From SC Cambuur)
--	FW	CPV	Cecilio Lopes (On loan from SC Heerenveen)
--	DF	NED	Brian Tevreden (From FC Lisse)

Out: Note: Flags indicate national team as defined under FIFA eligibility rules; some limited exceptions apply. Players may hold more than one non-FIFA nationality.

No.	Pos.	Nation	Player
--	GK	BEL	Govert Boyen (To (Belgium) Verbroedering Geel-Meerhout)

=== FC Eindhoven ===
In: Note: Flags indicate national team as defined under FIFA eligibility rules; some limited exceptions apply. Players may hold more than one non-FIFA nationality.

No.	Pos.	Nation	Player
--	FW	BEL	Pieter Mbemba (On loan from (Belgium) KV Mechelen)
--	FW	NED	Jelle Schijvenaars (On loan from (Belgium) KVSK United)
--	FW	FRA	Abdoulaye Sekou Sampil (From (Belgium) Kapellen)

Out: Note: Flags indicate national team as defined under FIFA eligibility rules; some limited exceptions apply. Players may hold more than one non-FIFA nationality.

No.	Pos.	Nation	Player
--	FW	NED	Levi van der Heijden (To (Belgium) Racing Mol-Wezel)
--	DF	NED	Joos van Barneveld (released)

=== FC Emmen ===
In: Note: Flags indicate national team as defined under FIFA eligibility rules; some limited exceptions apply. Players may hold more than one non-FIFA nationality.

No.	Pos.	Nation	Player
--	MF	NED	Reza Ghoochannejhad (On loan from SC Heerenveen)
26	DF	NED	Robin Huisman de Jong (On loan from SC Heerenveen)
--	FW	NED	Marcel Kleizen (On loan from FC Zwolle)

Out: Note: Flags indicate national team as defined under FIFA eligibility rules; some limited exceptions apply. Players may hold more than one non-FIFA nationality.

No.	Pos.	Nation	Player
9	FW	SLO	Tim Matavz (was on loan from FC Groningen)

=== Excelsior ===
In: Note: Flags indicate national team as defined under FIFA eligibility rules; some limited exceptions apply. Players may hold more than one non-FIFA nationality.

No.	Pos.	Nation	Player
--	FW	NED	Mohammed Faouzi (From FC Utrecht)
--	FW	NED	Guyon Fernandez (From ADO Den Haag)

Out: Note: Flags indicate national team as defined under FIFA eligibility rules; some limited exceptions apply. Players may hold more than one non-FIFA nationality.

No.	Pos.	Nation	Player
--	FW	NED	Rogier Veenstra (To Haarlem, was on loan from NAC Breda)

=== Fortuna Sittard ===
In: Note: Flags indicate national team as defined under FIFA eligibility rules; some limited exceptions apply. Players may hold more than one non-FIFA nationality.

No.	Pos.	Nation	Player

Out: Note: Flags indicate national team as defined under FIFA eligibility rules; some limited exceptions apply. Players may hold more than one non-FIFA nationality.

No.	Pos.	Nation	Player

=== Go Ahead Eagles ===
In: Note: Flags indicate national team as defined under FIFA eligibility rules; some limited exceptions apply. Players may hold more than one non-FIFA nationality.

No.	Pos.	Nation	Player
--	MF	FIN	Kari Arkivuo (From (Norway) Sandefjord)
--	MF	NED	Timon van Leeuwen (From Feyenoord)
--	FW	NED	Jules Reimerink (On loan from FC Twente)

Out: Note: Flags indicate national team as defined under FIFA eligibility rules; some limited exceptions apply. Players may hold more than one non-FIFA nationality.

No.	Pos.	Nation	Player

=== HFC Haarlem ===
In: Note: Flags indicate national team as defined under FIFA eligibility rules; some limited exceptions apply. Players may hold more than one non-FIFA nationality.

No.	Pos.	Nation	Player
--	FW	NED	Renaldo Jongebloet (On loan from Ajax)
--	MF	NED	Levi Schwiebbe (On loan from ADO Den Haag)
--	MF	NED	Chedric Seedorf (On loan from (Italy) AC Milan)
--	FW	NED	Rogier Veenstra (On loan from NAC Breda)

Out: Note: Flags indicate national team as defined under FIFA eligibility rules; some limited exceptions apply. Players may hold more than one non-FIFA nationality.

No.	Pos.	Nation	Player
--	FW	NED	Frank van der Zwan (Loan return to FC Utrecht)

=== Helmond Sport ===
In: Note: Flags indicate national team as defined under FIFA eligibility rules; some limited exceptions apply. Players may hold more than one non-FIFA nationality.

No.	Pos.	Nation	Player
24	FW	ANT	Nyron Wau (Free agent)

Out: Note: Flags indicate national team as defined under FIFA eligibility rules; some limited exceptions apply. Players may hold more than one non-FIFA nationality.

No.	Pos.	Nation	Player

=== MVV ===
In: Note: Flags indicate national team as defined under FIFA eligibility rules; some limited exceptions apply. Players may hold more than one non-FIFA nationality.

No.	Pos.	Nation	Player
27	FW	BEL	Gideon Boateng (From (Belgium) Anderlecht)
--	MF	FRA	Raji Naoufal (From (Belgium) Germinal Beerschot)

Out: Note: Flags indicate national team as defined under FIFA eligibility rules; some limited exceptions apply. Players may hold more than one non-FIFA nationality.

No.	Pos.	Nation	Player

=== FC Omniworld ===
In: Note: Flags indicate national team as defined under FIFA eligibility rules; some limited exceptions apply. Players may hold more than one non-FIFA nationality.

No.	Pos.	Nation	Player

Out: Note: Flags indicate national team as defined under FIFA eligibility rules; some limited exceptions apply. Players may hold more than one non-FIFA nationality.

No.	Pos.	Nation	Player

=== RBC Roosendaal ===
In: Note: Flags indicate national team as defined under FIFA eligibility rules; some limited exceptions apply. Players may hold more than one non-FIFA nationality.

No.	Pos.	Nation	Player
25	FW	NED	Gregory Nelson (On loan from AZ)
--	GK	NED	Ariën Pietersma (On loan to RBC Roosendaal)
--	FW	BEL	Jordan Remacle (On loan from RKC Waalwijk)
--	MF	BEL	Giuseppe Riole (On loan from (Belgium) Zulte Waregem)
--	MF	BEL	Jama Sharifi (From (Belgium) RACS Couillet)

Out: Note: Flags indicate national team as defined under FIFA eligibility rules; some limited exceptions apply. Players may hold more than one non-FIFA nationality.

No.	Pos.	Nation	Player

=== RKC Waalwijk ===
In: Note: Flags indicate national team as defined under FIFA eligibility rules; some limited exceptions apply. Players may hold more than one non-FIFA nationality.

No.	Pos.	Nation	Player
--	FW	NED	Jordy Brouwer (On loan from (England) Liverpool)

Out: Note: Flags indicate national team as defined under FIFA eligibility rules; some limited exceptions apply. Players may hold more than one non-FIFA nationality.

No.	Pos.	Nation	Player
--	FW	BEL	Jordan Remacle (On loan to RBC Roosendaal)

=== Telstar ===
In: Note: Flags indicate national team as defined under FIFA eligibility rules; some limited exceptions apply. Players may hold more than one non-FIFA nationality.

No.	Pos.	Nation	Player
15	MF	NED	Gaston Salasiwa (On loan from AZ)

Out: Note: Flags indicate national team as defined under FIFA eligibility rules; some limited exceptions apply. Players may hold more than one non-FIFA nationality.

No.	Pos.	Nation	Player
23	GK	NED	Serge van den Ban (released)

=== TOP Oss ===
In: Note: Flags indicate national team as defined under FIFA eligibility rules; some limited exceptions apply. Players may hold more than one non-FIFA nationality.

No.	Pos.	Nation	Player
19	FW	BEL	Emrullah Güvenç (Free agent)
--	MF	NED	Dominique Scholten (On loan from NEC)
--	FW	BFA	Ousmane Sanou (From (Belgium) Berchem Sport)

Out: Note: Flags indicate national team as defined under FIFA eligibility rules; some limited exceptions apply. Players may hold more than one non-FIFA nationality.

No.	Pos.	Nation	Player
19	MF	NED	Marc Harlaux (To FC Lienden)

=== BV Veendam ===
In: Note: Flags indicate national team as defined under FIFA eligibility rules; some limited exceptions apply. Players may hold more than one non-FIFA nationality.

No.	Pos.	Nation	Player
--	FW	NED	Serdar Öztürk (On loan from FC Groningen)

Out: Note: Flags indicate national team as defined under FIFA eligibility rules; some limited exceptions apply. Players may hold more than one non-FIFA nationality.

No.	Pos.	Nation	Player

=== VVV-Venlo ===
In: Note: Flags indicate national team as defined under FIFA eligibility rules; some limited exceptions apply. Players may hold more than one non-FIFA nationality.

No.	Pos.	Nation	Player

Out: Note: Flags indicate national team as defined under FIFA eligibility rules; some limited exceptions apply. Players may hold more than one non-FIFA nationality.

No.	Pos.	Nation	Player

=== FC Zwolle ===
In: Note: Flags indicate national team as defined under FIFA eligibility rules; some limited exceptions apply. Players may hold more than one non-FIFA nationality.

No.	Pos.	Nation	Player
--	FW	ARG	Hugo Bargas (On loan from De Graafschap)
--	MF	CAN	Brandon Bonifacio (On loan from SC Cambuur-Leeuwarden)
--	MF	NED	Cees Keizer (On loan from Vitesse Arnhem)
--	DF	NED	Nick Kuipers (On loan from FC Utrecht)

Out: Note: Flags indicate national team as defined under FIFA eligibility rules; some limited exceptions apply. Players may hold more than one non-FIFA nationality.

No.	Pos.	Nation	Player
--	FW	NED	Marcel Kleizen (On loan to FC Emmen)

== See also ==
- Football in the Netherlands
- Transfer window
