= Nick Kuipers =

Nick Kuipers may refer to:

- Nick Kuipers (footballer, born 1988), Dutch footballer for Go Ahead Kampen
- Nick Kuipers (footballer, born 1992), Dutch footballer for Dewa United Banten
