= Robin Faber =

Dutch footballer (born 1986)

Personal information
- Date of birth: 2 July 1986 (age 40)
- Place of birth: Doetinchem, Netherlands
- Position: Central defender

Youth career
- De Graafschap
- 2003–2007: PSV

Senior career*
Years	Team	Apps	(Gls)
2007–2008	Vitesse	0	(0)
2008	ADO Den Haag	0	(0)
2009–2010	Eindhoven	19	(1)
2010	Víkingur	6	(0)
2011-2012	Quick Boys		
2012-2015	Westlandia		
2015-2019	DZC '68		
Total		25	(1)
- * Club domestic league appearances and goals

Robin Faber (born 2 July 1986) is a Dutch retired footballer who played as a central defender.

== Career ==
Born in Doetinchem, Faber played youth football with De Graafschap and PSV. He spent the 2007–08 season with Vitesse, but failed to make a first-team appearance. He then played for ADO Den Haag, but was released by the club in December 2008, alongside Virgilio Texeira, Tim De Meersman and Samir El Moussaoui, after failing to make a first-team appearance for them. He signed for FC Eindhoven following a successful trial in August 2009, scoring 1 goal in 19 appearances for the club. He signed for Icelandic club Víkingur in July 2010, making 6 appearances for them. Upon his return to the Netherlands, he played in the lower leagues with Quick Boys, Westlandia and DZC '68.

== Post-playing career ==
In 2022, Faber was appointed commercial manager at NEC after earlier working for a sportmarketing and a broadcasting company.
