= Jesse Reinders =

Dutch football player

Personal information
- Date of birth: 23 August 2002 (age 24)
- Place of birth: Noordwijk, Netherlands
- Height: 1.82 m (6 ft 0 in)
- Position: Defensive midfielder

Team information
- Current team: Quick Boys
- Number: 8

Youth career
- –2014: Noordwijk
- 2014–2020: ADO Den Haag

Senior career*
Years	Team	Apps	(Gls)
2020–2023	ADO Den Haag II	26	(0)
2022–2023	ADO Den Haag	3	(0)
2023–	Quick Boys	60	(4)
- * Club domestic league appearances and goals as of 18:55, 27 May 2026 (UTC)

Jesse Reinders (born 23 August 2002) is a Dutch footballer who plays as a midfielder for Quick Boys.

== Personal life ==
Reinders played for VV Noordwijk until he was 12, where his father Arnold once played in the first team. Reinders continues to be based in Noordwijk.

== Career ==
Reinders signed his first professional contract with ADO Den Haag in July 2021 to keep him with the club for 2 seasons. He made his professional debut for Den Haag on 19 August 2022 against MVV Maastricht in a 3–1 defeat appearing as a second-half substitute for Gregor Breinburg. In the summer of 2023, he signed for Quick Boys.
