= Ivo Rossen =

Dutch football player and coach (born 1982)

Personal information
- Date of birth: 14 March 1982 (age 44)
- Place of birth: Nijmegen, Netherlands
- Height: 1.82 m (6 ft 0 in)
- Position: Centre-back

Youth career
- SV Estria
- PSV
- NEC

Senior career*
Years	Team	Apps	(Gls)
2002–2003	NEC	0	(0)
2003–2004	Dordrecht	18	(1)
2004–2005	Go Ahead Eagles	27	(1)
2005–2007	Zwolle	42	(0)
2007–2009	Den Bosch	39	(1)
2009–2012	Eindhoven	80	(2)
2012–2014	Sint-Truiden	48	(1)
2014–2017	Eindhoven	29	(0)
Total		283	(6)

Managerial career
- 2017–2019: SV Estria
- 2019–2021: Quick 1888
- 2019–2021: Eindhoven (assistant)
- 2021–2024: Heracles Almelo (assistant)
- 2024–: VVV-Venlo (assistant)
- * Club domestic league appearances and goals

Ivo Rossen (born 14 March 1982) is a Dutch football coach and former professional player who is currently serving as a first-team coach at VVV-Venlo.

== Playing career ==
Rossen began his professional career at NEC, but did not establish himself at the club. He debuted professionally with Dordrecht and went on to play for Go Ahead Eagles, FC Zwolle, Den Bosch, and Eindhoven—all in the second-tier Eerste Divisie. In July 2012, he joined Belgian Pro League side Sint-Truiden, but his contract was terminated in February 2014 following a dispute with management. On 21 June 2014, he rejoined Eindhoven.

== Coaching career ==
After retiring at the end of the 2016–17 season, Rossen returned to his youth club, SV Estria, as a player-coach in the Vierde Klasse. He later began working as a youth and assistant coach at FC Eindhoven and also coached Quick 1888.

In May 2021, he was appointed assistant coach at Heracles Almelo, succeeding Peter Reekers.

In June 2024, Rossen joined VVV-Venlo as a transition coach, bridging youth and first-team development. He followed John Lammers, with whom he had previously worked at Heracles.
