= Resit Schuurman =

Dutch footballer (born 1979)

Personal information
- Full name: Resit Dede Schuurman
- Date of birth: 31 March 1979 (age 47)
- Place of birth: Deventer, Netherlands
- Height: 1.76 m (5 ft 9 in)
- Position: Midfielder

Youth career
- 1985–1993: Schalkhaar
- 1993–1997: Go Ahead Eagles

Senior career*
Years	Team	Apps	(Gls)
1997–2001	Go Ahead Eagles	100	(14)
2001–2004	NEC	100	(5)
2004–2007	Twente	44	(1)
2007–2009	De Graafschap	65	(0)
2009–2010	Heracles Almelo	2	(0)
2010–2013	Go Ahead Eagles	35	(1)
Total		346	(21)

International career
2000–2001	Netherlands U21	11	(0)

Managerial career
- 2018: Go Ahead Eagles U19
- 2019–2021: VV Activia
- 2021–: DVV Davo
- * Club domestic league appearances and goals

Resit Schuurman (born 31 March 1979) is a Dutch football manager and former professional player, who is currently the head coach of Vierde Klasse club DVV Davo. As a player, he was a defensive midfielder renowned for coupling physical power with great technique.

== Club career ==
Schuurman made his debut in the professional football squad of Go Ahead Eagles in the 1997–98 season. He moved to NEC in 2001, where he made his debut in the Eredivisie under manager Johan Neeskens. In the last matchday of the 2002–03 season, the team reached European football after a win in injury time against RKC Waalwijk. Schuurman delivered the assist to the winning goal by Jaromír Šimr. In the European campaign of the following season, NEC were knocked out of contention by Wisła Kraków. Schuurman made a total of 100 league appearances for the club during a three-year spell.

Schuurman later moved to Twente in a player swap with Patrick Pothuizen. He would also appear for De Graafschap. In July 2009, Schuurman signed a two-year contract with Heracles Almelo after his former team De Graafschap relegated to the Eerste Divisie. He then returned to Go Ahead Eagles. He was released after his contract had expired in July 2013. He subsequently retired from football.

== International career ==
Schuurman was born in the Netherlands to a Turkish father and Dutch mother. He was a youth international for the Netherlands.

== Managerial career ==
After retiring as a player, Schuurman began coaching various teams in the youth academy of Go Ahead Eagles. In January 2019, he was appointed head coach of Derde Klasse club VV Activia in Twello. At that point, he was the assistant to Uğur Yıldırım at Go Ahead Eagles U17.

On 8 January 2021, it was announced that Schuurman would become the manager of Vierde Klasse club DVV Davo from the beginning of the 2021–22 season.
