= Jurrick Juliana =

Dutch footballer (born 1984)

Personal information
- Date of birth: 21 July 1984 (age 42)
- Place of birth: Willemstad, Curaçao
- Height: 1.75 m (5 ft 9 in)
- Position: Forward

Youth career
- 1999–2001: Excelsior Maassluis
- 2001–2003: Vitesse 1892

Senior career*
Years	Team	Apps	(Gls)
2003–2007	AGOVV Apeldoorn	112	(31)
2007–2009	Cambuur	34	(12)
2009	FC Dordrecht	1	(0)
2010–2011	DVS '33		
2012–2013	SV Vaassen		
2013–2014	Alexandria Apeldoorn		
- * Club domestic league appearances and goals

Jurrick Juliana (born 21 July 1984) is a Curaçaoan former professional footballer who played as a forward.

== Career ==
Born in Willemstad, Curaçao in the former Netherlands Antilles, Juliana began playing professional football with AGOVV Apeldoorn, initially signing a three-year contract in 2003. The striker scored 31 goals in 112 league matches for AGOVV before signing with SC Cambuur in August 2007. He would also play for FC Dordrecht in the Eerste Divisie.

Juliana received a call-up from Netherlands Antilles national team manager Pim Verbeek in December 2003, but his club refused to release him for international duty.
