= Dennis Hollart =

Dutch footballer

Personal information
- Date of birth: 13 November 1983 (age 42)
- Place of birth: Lelystad, Netherlands
- Height: 1.79 m (5 ft 10 in)
- Position: Centre-back

Youth career
- Lelystad '67
- Heerenveen

Senior career*
Years	Team	Apps	(Gls)
2005–2009	Omniworld	133	(2)
2009–2011	Go Ahead Eagles	63	(2)
2011–2012	Almere City	26	(1)
2012–2017	IJsselmeervogels	107	(2)
2017–2019	DVS '33	63	(2)
2020–2025	Eemdijk	50	(3)
Total		442	(12)
- * Club domestic league appearances and goals as of 7 October 2024

Dennis Hollart (born 13 November 1983) is a Dutch retired footballer who played as a centre-back.

== Career ==
He made his Eerste Divisie league debut with Omniworld during the 2005–06 season. Hollart also played for Go Ahead Eagles and returned to Almere City in 2011 only to have his contract terminated by mutual agreement a year later. He later left IJsselmeervogels, where he captained the team, for fellow amateur side DVS '33.

In December 2018, Hollart announced that he would retire at the end of the season.

On 20 November 2020, Hollart came out of retirement and signed a one-and-a-half-year contract with Eemdijk at age 37. He retired in 2025.
