= Sven Delanoy =

Belgian footballer

Personal information
- Date of birth: 7 October 1983 (age 43)
- Place of birth: Turnhout, Belgium
- Height: 1.78 m (5 ft 10 in)
- Position: Midfielder

Senior career*
| Years | Team | Apps | (Gls) |
| 2003–2006 | Willem II | 17 | (0) |
| 2006–2009 | RBC Roosendaal | 106 | (11) |
| 2009–2010 | FC Dordrecht | 26 | (3) |
| 2010–2012 | KV Turnhout | 47 | (4) |
| 2012–2013 | Sint-Niklaas | 31 | (0) |
| 2013–2014 | KMSK Deinze | 26 | (1) |
| 2014–2016 | KSV Temse | 60 | (1) |
| 2016–2021 | SK Lochristi | | |
- * Club domestic league appearances and goals

Sven Delanoy (born 7 October 1983) is a Belgian footballer, who plays as a midfielder.

He has formerly played in the Netherlands, representing Willem II, RBC Roosendaal and FC Dordrecht, and in his native Belgium, where he was on the books of KV Turnhout, Sint-Niklaas, KMSK Deinze and KSV Temse.

== Honours ==
Willem II

- KNVB Cup runner-up: 2004–05
