= Glenn Kobussen =

Dutch footballer (born 1989)

Personal information
- Date of birth: 16 June 1989 (age 37)
- Place of birth: Deventer, Netherlands
- Height: 1.71 m (5 ft 7 in)
- Position: Midfielder

Team information
- Current team: SV Helios

Youth career
- –2001: SV Helios
- 2001–2004: Vitesse
- 2004–2008: Feyenoord

Senior career*
Years	Team	Apps	(Gls)
2008–2009	Feyenoord	1	(0)
2009–2012	Go Ahead Eagles	19	(0)
2012–2023	HHC Hardenberg	271	(19)
2023–	SV Helios		
- * Club domestic league appearances and goals as of 17:58, 9 May 2024 (UTC)

Glenn Kobussen (born 16 June 1989) is a Dutch footballer who plays for SV Helios as a midfielder.

== Career ==
Born in Deventer, Kobussen has played for Feyenoord, Go Ahead Eagles and HHC Hardenberg. In February 2015 he extended his contract with HHC Hardenberg until mid-2017.

In 2023, after 11 seasons at HHC, Kobussen left the club to return to his youth club SV Helios.
