= Brandon Bonifacio =

Canadian soccer player

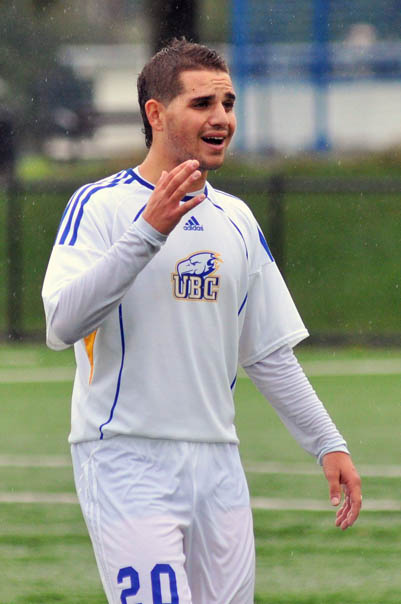

Personal information
- Date of birth: 29 June 1989 (age 37)
- Place of birth: Vancouver, British Columbia, Canada
- Height: 5 ft 8 in (1.73 m)
- Position: Midfielder

Youth career
- –2006: Whitecaps FC Academy

College career
Years	Team	Apps	(Gls)
2012–13	UBC Thunderbirds		

Senior career*
Years	Team	Apps	(Gls)
2006–2009	SC Cambuur	13	(0)
2009	→ FC Zwolle (loan)	3	(1)

International career^{‡}
2006–2008	Canada U20	5	(0)
- * Club domestic league appearances and goals as of 4 February 2009 ‡ National team caps and goals as of 4 February 2009

Brandon Bonifacio (born 29 June 1989) is a Canadian soccer player who played for UBC Thunderbirds.

== Career ==
He began as a midfielder with Whitecaps FC Academy and joined 2006 in the youth system of SC Cambuur of the Dutch Eerste Divisie.

After advancing to SC Cambuur's professional team for one year and half he went on loan to FC Zwolle. A short time later he made a decision to return to Canada to attend the University of British Columbia rather than continue with professional soccer.

== International career ==
He is former member of the Canada U-20 men's national soccer team and has five games played for the team. He was also voted second for Canadian U20 Player of the Year.
