= Melvin Kolf =

Dutch footballer (born 1986)

Personal information
- Date of birth: 22 March 1986 (age 40)
- Place of birth: Nijmegen, Netherlands
- Height: 1.76 m (5 ft 9 in)
- Position: Forward

Youth career
- Quick 1888
- Vitesse
- NEC Nijmegen

Senior career*
Years	Team	Apps	(Gls)
2008–2009	De Graafschap		
2009–2011	FC Oss		
2011–2012	NEC Nijmegen II		
2012–?	FC Presikhaaf		
- * Club domestic league appearances and goals

Melvin Kolf (born 22 March 1986) is a Dutch former professional footballer who played as a forward for De Graafschap and FC Oss.

== Career ==
Kolf played youth football for Quick 1888, Vitesse and NEC Nijmegen. He spent two years at De Graafschap before joining FC Oss where he made 29 appearances in the Eerste Divisie.

Kolf moved from the NEC Nijmegen reserves to FC Presikhaaf in March 2012.

== Post-playing career ==
After his retirement from playing, Kolf became a youth worker in the Presikhaaf neighbourhood in Arnhem.

== Personal life ==
Kolf was born in Nijmegen to a Surinamese father and a Dutch mother. He has two siblings.
