= Mohammed Faouzi =

Dutch footballer

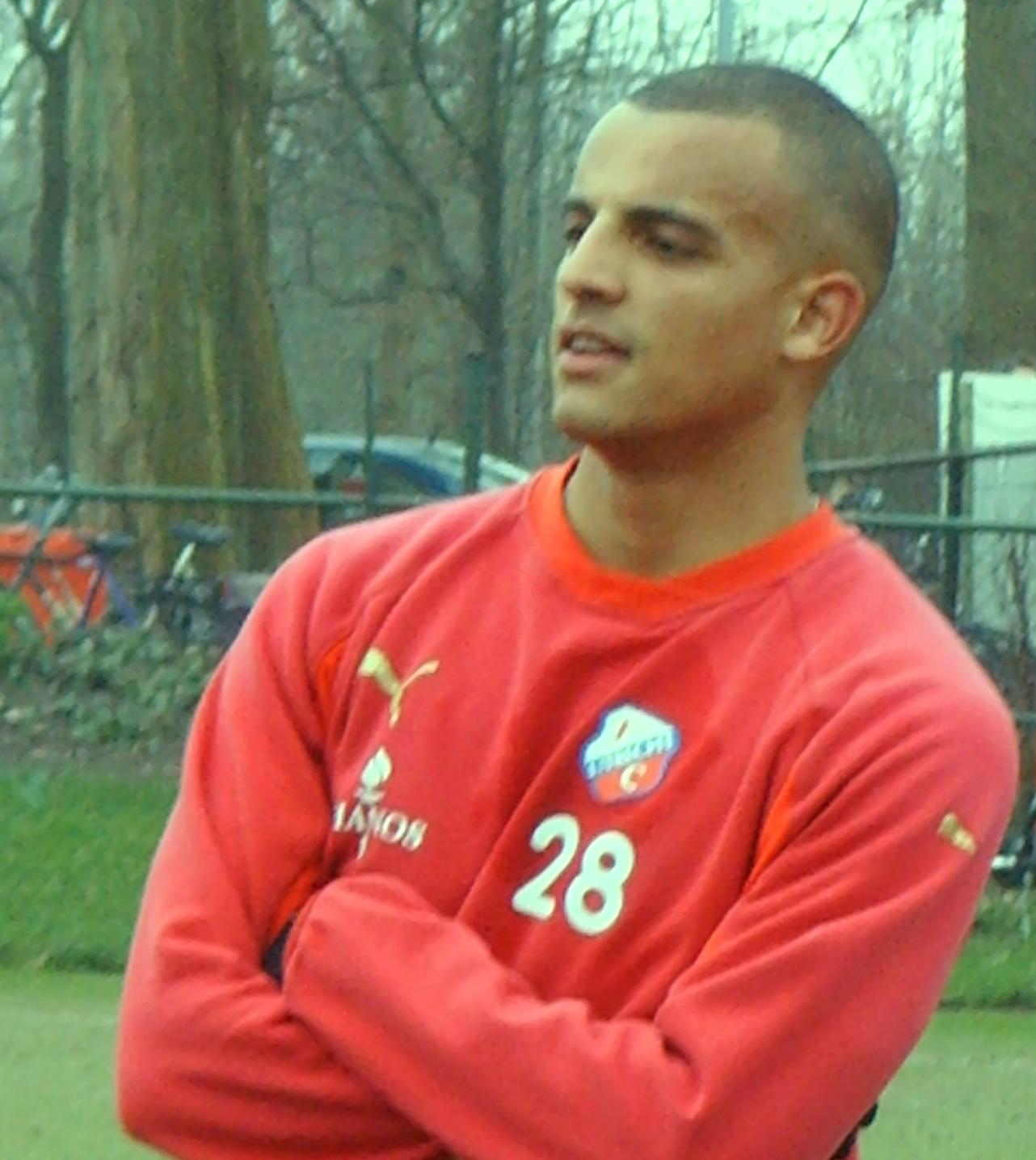

Personal information
- Full name: Mohammed Faouzi
- Date of birth: 3 September 1987 (age 39)
- Place of birth: Gouda, Netherlands
- Height: 1.83 m (6 ft 0 in)
- Position: Striker

Youth career
- ONA
- Excelsior
- Utrecht

Senior career*
Years	Team	Apps	(Gls)
2008–2010	Excelsior	11	(1)
2010–2012	Noordwijk	28	(18)
2012–2013	IJsselmeervogels	27	(4)
2013–2015	Noordwijk	30	(12)
2015–2016	SteDoCo	30	(12)
2016–2017	SC Feyenoord		
2017–2018	Jodan Boys		
2018–2021	ONA		
- * Club domestic league appearances and goals as of 30 December 2020

Mohammed Faouzi (born 3 September 1987) is a Dutch retired footballer.

== Club career ==
Faouzi is a striker who became "Talent of the Year" in the Nike A-juniors Eredivisie in 2006. He played professionally for Excelsior and descended into amateur football playing for the likes of Noordwijk, IJsselmeervogels, SteDoCo and SC Feyenoord before joining Jodan Boys. He returned to his first childhood club ONA in 2018.

== Personal life ==
Faouzi studied law at Leiden University and works as a lawyer. He is also member of the disciplinary committee of the KNVB - Dutch FA.
