= Samir El Moussaoui =

Dutch footballer

Personal information
- Date of birth: 17 September 1986 (age 40)
- Place of birth: The Hague, Netherlands
- Height: 1.78 m (5 ft 10 in)
- Position: Centre-back

Team information
- Current team: Wateringse Veld

Youth career
- Juventas
- 2000–2002: Feyenoord
- 2002–2006: ADO Den Haag

Senior career*
Years	Team	Apps	(Gls)
2006–2008	ADO Den Haag	39	(0)
2009	Den Bosch	0	(0)
2009–2010	Excelsior	1	(0)
2010–2020	Scheveningen	218	(19)
2020–	Wateringse Veld		
- * Club domestic league appearances and goals as of 9 November 2020 (UTC)

Samir El Moussaoui (Arabic: سمير الموساوي; born 17 September 1986) is a Dutch footballer who plays as a centre-back for Wateringse Veld in the Dutch Tweede Klasse. He formerly played for ADO Den Haag, FC Den Bosch and Excelsior. Mostly notably, he had a ten-year stint with SVV Scheveningen, making more than 200 appearances for the club between 2010 and 2020.

== Career ==
On February 16, 2007, El Moussaoui played his first Eredivisie match for ADO against Willem II Tilburg.

In December 2008 he was one of four players released by ADO Den Haag, alongside Tim De Meersman, Robin Faber and Virgilio Teixeira.

Since then, he has played for Den Bosch and Excelsior, being released from both clubs after a short period of time. In the summer of 2010 he started playing for SVV Scheveningen, currently in the Dutch Topklasse.
