= Rence van der Wal =

Dutch footballer

Rence van der Wal (born May 2, 1989, in Ede, Gelderland) is a Dutch footballer, who played as a striker at the first division club Go Ahead Eagles from Deventer.

Van der Wal made his debut for Go Ahead Eagles on January 13, 2006. He once was wanted by many Eredivisie clubs but he decided to stay with Go Ahead Eagles. His decision was based on a talk he had with Marc Overmars who also began his career there. Now, he plays for DTS'35 Ede.

As of the 2009–2010 season, Rence van der Wal will be playing for Dutch top first division club SC Cambuur.
