= Tim De Meersman =

Belgian footballer

Personal information
- Date of birth: 1 February 1985 (age 41)
- Place of birth: Dendermonde, Belgium
- Height: 1.77 m (5 ft 10 in)
- Position: Midfielder

Youth career
- Germinal Beerschot

Senior career*
Years	Team	Apps	(Gls)
2004–2007	Vitesse	3	(0)
2007–2008	FC Eindhoven	37	(7)
2008	ADO Den Haag	0	(0)
2009–2010	Dender	28	(5)
2010–2012	Sint-Niklaas	46	(9)
2012–2013	Hoek		
2013–2014	Bornem	19	(2)
2014–2015	Pepingen		
2015–2017	Eendracht Zele		
2017–2018	Ninove		
- * Club domestic league appearances and goals

Tim De Meersman (born 1 February 1985) is a Belgian former professional footballer who played as a midfielder.

== Career ==
De Meersman was born in Dendermonde, and played youth football with Germinal Beerschot. After playing for Dutch clubs Vitesse and FC Eindhoven, in May 2008 he was linked with transfers to both ADO Den Haag and FC Dordrecht. He signed a two-year contract with ADO in June 2008, alongside Karim Soltani. He was released by the club in December 2008 (alongside Virgilio Texeira, Robin Faber and Samir El Moussaoui) after he failed to make a first-team appearance for them, and he returned to Belgium in June 2009 to sign with Dender, where he hoped to "re-launch" his career. After spending time with Sint-Niklaas, he signed for Dutch club HSV Hoek in January 2012. He later played in the Belgian lower leagues with KSV Bornem, FC Pepingen, Eendracht Zele and Ninove.
