= Bruno Appels =

Belgian association football player

Personal information
- Date of birth: 15 August 1988 (age 38)
- Place of birth: Turnhout, Belgium
- Height: 1.80 m (5 ft 11 in)
- Position: Goalkeeper

Youth career
- –1998: KSK Oosthoven
- 1998–2008: Willem II

Senior career*
Years	Team	Apps	(Gls)
2008–2009	Willem II	0	(0)
2009–2015	Den Bosch	41	(0)
2015–2016	ASV Geel	1	(0)
2016	Den Bosch	4	(0)
2016–2021	Berchem Sport	67	(0)
Total		113	(0)
- * Club domestic league appearances and goals

Bruno Appels (born 15 August 1988) is a Belgian former footballer who played as a goalkeeper.

== Career ==
Appels played in the youth academy of Dutch club Willem II since age 10 and in July 2009 he made the move to Eerste Divisie club FC Den Bosch. On 3 September 2010, he made his professional debut in a match against Telstar. For several seasons, Appels acted as the team's second goalkeeper behind Kevin Begois. In February 2012, he extended his contract with FC Den Bosch until 2014. Ahead of the 2013–14 season, manager Ruud Kaiser promoted Appels to starting goalkeeper. He only played the first game of the season before being sidelined for an extended period with injuries. He only returned to the starting eleven in February 2014.

In June 2015, he was briefly on trial with his former club Willem II, but he eventually signed for Belgian Second Division club ASV Geel ahead of the 2015–16 season. During the winter break he returned to FC Den Bosch but soon suffered another injury.

In June 2016, Appels signed with Belgian Division 2 club Berchem Sport.

In July 2021, Appels announced his retirement from football, instead focusing on his new career as a goalkeepers coach at Turnhout.
