= Tjeerd Korf =

Dutch footballer

Personal information
- Full name: Tjeerd Elize Korf
- Date of birth: 11 May 1983 (age 43)
- Place of birth: Emmeloord, Netherlands
- Height: 1.89 m (6 ft 2 in)
- Position: Striker

Team information
- Current team: BV Veendam

Youth career
- Flevo Boys

Senior career*
Years	Team	Apps	(Gls)
2002–2007	FC Zwolle	126	(19)
2007–2009	Excelsior	65	(2)
2009–2010	BV Veendam	30	(5)
2010–2012	Flevo Boys		
2012–2014	WHC Wezep		
2014–2016	Genemuiden		
2016–2017	Flevo Boys		
- * Club domestic league appearances and goals

Tjeerd Eize Korf (born 11 May 1983) is a Dutch former professional footballer who played as a striker.

== Career ==
Born in Emmeloord, Korf began his career with Flevo Boys. He has also played professionally for FC Zwolle and SBV Excelsior.

== Personal life ==
His father is ex-player Steven Korf.
