= Niels Wellenberg =

Dutch footballer

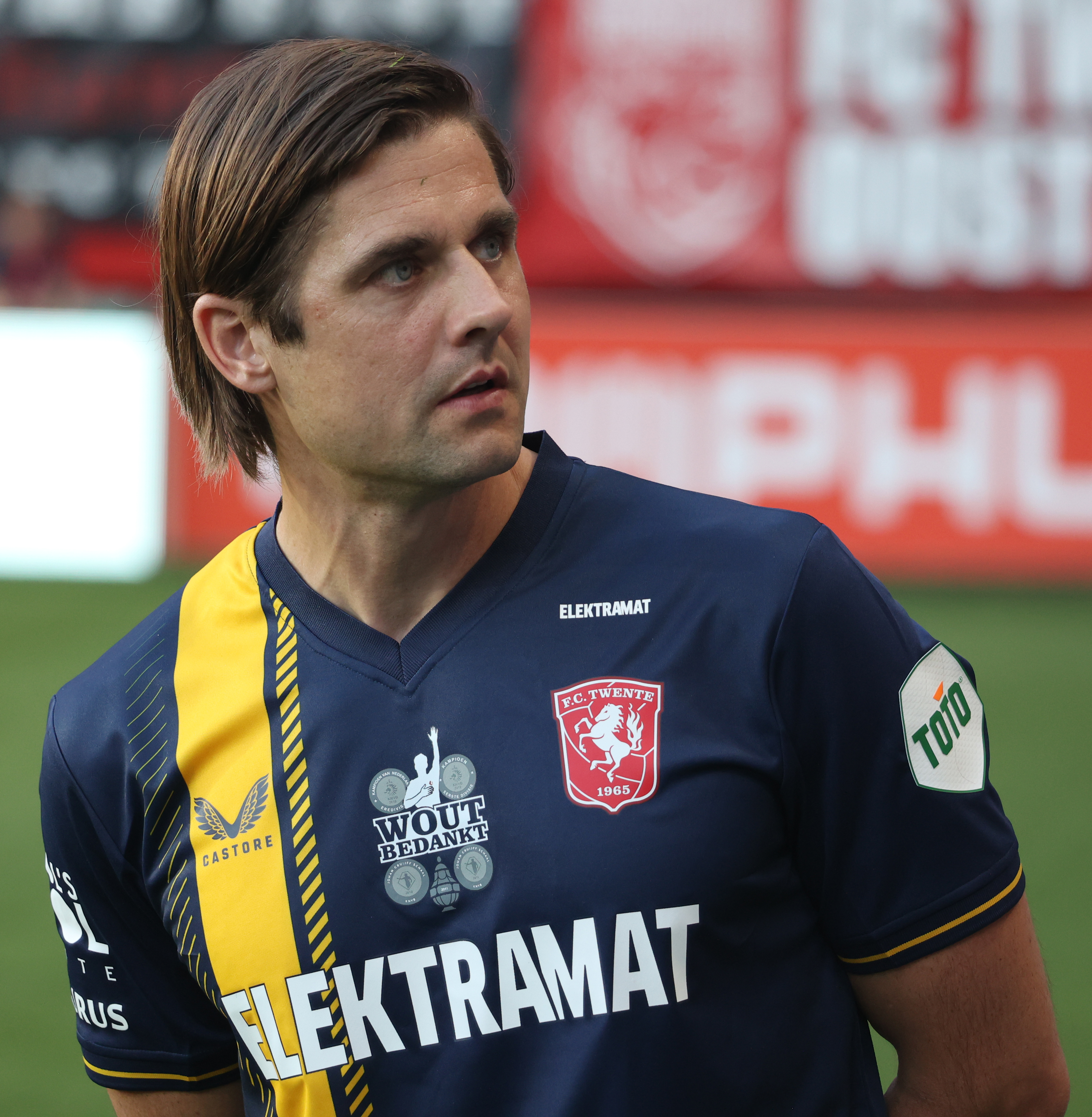

Personal information
- Date of birth: August 9, 1982 (age 44)
- Place of birth: Deventer, Netherlands
- Height: 1.80 m (5 ft 11 in)
- Position: Right back

Youth career
- Rohda Raalte
- Go Ahead Eagles

Senior career*
Years	Team	Apps	(Gls)
2001–2004	Go Ahead Eagles	72	(3)
2004–2009	Twente	86	(0)
2009–2012	NEC	25	(0)
- * Club domestic league appearances and goals

Niels Wellenberg (Dutch pronunciation: [nils ˈʋɛlə(m)bɛr(ə)x]; born 9 August 1982) is a Dutch former professional footballer.

== Career ==
Both comfortable playing defender and midfielder, Wellenberg was born in Deventer and made his debut in the professional football squad of Go Ahead Eagles in the 2001–02 season. Before, he had played amateur football with Rohda Raalte. He joined Twente in 2004.

On 13 July 2009, it was announced that Wellenberg had signed a three-year deal with NEC. In Nijmegen, he often struggled with injuries. After his contract with NEC was not extended, Wellenberg announced his retirement from professional football in 2012.

== Honours ==
Twente

- UEFA Intertoto Cup co-winner: 2006
