= Steef Nieuwendaal =

Dutch footballer

Personal information
- Full name: Steef Nieuwendaal
- Date of birth: 29 January 1986 (age 40)
- Place of birth: Weert, Netherlands
- Height: 1.79 m (5 ft 10 1/2 in)
- Position: Midfielder

Team information
- Current team: OJC Rosmalen
- Number: 4

Youth career
- SV Budel
- Willem II

Senior career*
Years	Team	Apps	(Gls)
2005–2009	Willem II	43	(0)
2006	→ MVV (loan)	7	(0)
2009–2011	FC Den Bosch	58	(1)
2011–2015	Sparta Rotterdam	127	(10)
2015–2017	RKC Waalwijk	64	(4)
2017–	OJC Rosmalen	1	(0)
- * Club domestic league appearances and goals as of 9 September 2017

Steef Nieuwendaal (Dutch pronunciation: [steːf ˈniu.ə(n)daːl], born 29 January 1986) is a Dutch footballer who currently plays for OJC Rosmalen in the Dutch Derde Divisie.

== Career ==
Nieuwendaal is a midfielder who was born in Weert and made his debut in professional football, being part of the Willem II Tilburg squad in the 2004–05 season. He also played for MVV Maastricht, FC Den Bosch and Sparta Rotterdam.
