= Virgilio Teixeira =

Dutch footballer

Personal information
- Full name: Virgilio Anastacio Teixeira
- Date of birth: 11 August 1973 (age 53)
- Place of birth: The Hague, Netherlands
- Height: 1.85 m (6 ft 1 in)
- Position: Centre-back

Team information
- Current team: Dordrecht (assistant)

Youth career
- GDS

Senior career*
| Years | Team | Apps | (Gls) |
| 1992–1998 | ADO Den Haag | 115 | (1) |
| 1998–2007 | RKC Waalwijk | 163 | (4) |
| 2007–2008 | ADO Den Haag | 32 | (3) |
| 2009–2010 | SVV Scheveningen | | |

Managerial career
- 2014–2015: Brabant United (U15)
- 2015–2016: NEC (U17)
- 2016–2017: NEC (U19)
- 2017–2018: Netherlands U18 (assistant)
- 2017–2021: Jong ADO Den Haag
- 2018: Netherlands U20 (interim)
- 2019: ADO Den Haag (interim assistant)
- 2021–: Dordrecht (assistant)
- * Club domestic league appearances and goals

Virgilio Anastacio Teixeira (born 11 August 1973) is a retired Dutch footballer and current assistant coach of FC Dordrecht.

== Career ==
Teixeira is a defender who was born in The Hague and made his debut in professional football, being part of the ADO Den Haag squad in the 1992–93 season.

In December 2008 he was one of four players released by ADO Den Haag, alongside Tim De Meersman, Robin Faber and Samir El Moussaoui.

== Post-retirement and coaching career ==
After retiring, Teixeira worked as an account manager from September 2010 to July 2012 at Stadio in the Foot & Teamwear department. In April 2014, he coached regional youth academy Brabant United's U15s. In June 2015, he was appointed head coach of NEC Nijmegen's U17s and in the following season, the U19s.

In the summer 2017, he took charge of the Jong-team of ADO Den Haag. He was also appointed assistant manager to Bert Konterman at Netherlands U20 national team. In September 2018, Teixeira temporarily took charge of Netherlands U20s in a game against England U20, due to the death of Bert Konterman's father. Teixeira won the game 3-1.

In December 2019, still in charge of Jong ADO Den Haag, Teixeira was promoted to assistant manager of the first team on an interim basis, after Edwin de Graaf was fired one week after head coach Alfons Groenendijk had resigned. It lasted until 24 December 2019, when Alan Pardew was appointed new head coach and brought his own staff with him.

On 24 June 2021 it was confirmed, that Teixeira would leave ADO to join FC Dordrecht as an assistant coach to manager Michele Santoni.
