= Marcel Kleizen =

Dutch footballer

Personal information
- Date of birth: 15 April 1986 (age 40)
- Place of birth: Hengelo, Netherlands
- Position: Forward

Youth career
- –2003: Achilles '12
- 2003–2005: Twente

Senior career*
Years	Team	Apps	(Gls)
2005–2008	Twente	6	(0)
2007–2008	→ Zwolle (loan)	26	(7)
2008–2009	Zwolle	14	(3)
2009	→ Emmen (loan)	0	(0)

International career
2007	Netherlands U20	1	(0)
- * Club domestic league appearances and goals

Marcel Kleizen (born 15 April 1986) is a Dutch former professional footballer who played as a forward.

== Club career ==
Kleizen made his debut in professional football for FC Twente in the 2005–06 Eredivisie season, playing five matches without scoring a goal. In the 2007–08 season, he was sent on loan to Zwolle.

He last played for Emmen on loan from Zwolle. After the 2008–09 season, Kleizen retired from professional football.

== International career ==
Kleizen received one call-up for the Netherlands U20 team, making his debut on 5 June 2007 in a 0–0 draw against Portugal.

== Retirement ==
In 2016, Kleizen became the unofficial European bicycle courier champion. After his football career, he had become a bicycle deliveryman for Cycloon Fietskoeriers.
