= Rogier Veenstra =

Dutch football manager (born 1987)

Personal information
- Date of birth: 17 September 1987 (age 39)
- Place of birth: Middelburg, Netherlands
- Height: 1.87 m (6 ft 2 in)
- Positions: Forward; left winger

Team information
- Current team: Quick Boys (head coach)

Youth career
- DVV Duiven
- RCS Oost-Souburg
- 2001–2006: NAC Breda

Senior career*
Years	Team	Apps	(Gls)
2006–2010	NAC Breda	13	(0)
2008	→ Excelsior (loan)	20	(1)
2009	→ Haarlem (loan)	12	(2)
2010–2011	Hoek		
2011–2013	Kloetinge		
Total		45+	(3+)

Managerial career
- 2015–2016: Zeelandia (assistant)
- 2016–2017: Zeelandia
- 2017–2019: Goes
- 2019–2022: ASWH
- 2022–2024: Excelsior (Youth Academy mngr.)
- 2023: Excelsior U21 (interim)
- 2024–2026: Kloetinge
- 2026–: Quick Boys
- * Club domestic league appearances and goals

Rogier Veenstra (born 17 September 1987) is a Dutch football manager and former professional footballer who played as a forward or left winger. He is the head coach of Tweede Divisie club Quick Boys.

== Career ==
=== Player ===
Born in Middelburg, Veenstra began his career at amateur side DVV Duiven, before joining RCS Oost-Souburg, where he was scouted by Eredivisie club NAC Breda. He spent five years in NAC's youth academy. Veenstra made his professional debut for NAC during the 2006–07 season. He spent the 2008–09 season on loan at Excelsior Rotterdam, and in January 2009 joined HFC Haarlem on loan.

In June 2010, Veenstra returned to amateur football with Topklasse club HSV Hoek. The following year he joined VV Kloetinge, where he played until 2013.

=== Manager ===
Veenstra began coaching in 2015 with Zeelandia, initially as assistant before taking charge of the first team the following year. He subsequently spent two seasons in charge of VV Goes, leading the club to promotion to the Derde Divisie and to victory in the district cup.

In the summer of 2019, Veenstra was appointed manager of ASWH, which had earned an unexpected promotion to the Tweede Divisie; aged 32, he was the division's youngest manager. His first season was curtailed by the COVID-19 pandemic: with ASWH bottom of the table, the competition was halted in March 2020, after which the KNVB cancelled all promotion and relegation for the 2019–20 season, allowing the club to retain its place. Veenstra remained in charge for three seasons, all in the Tweede Divisie.

In 2022, Veenstra joined Excelsior as head of its youth academy, a position he held until 2024. He was presented as manager of VV Kloetinge in December 2023 and took charge from the 2024–25 season. After a fourth-place finish in his first season, he led Kloetinge to the Derde Divisie B title in 2025–26.

On 2 June 2026, Quick Boys announced Veenstra as their head coach from the 2026–27 season on a two-year contract, succeeding Adrie Poldervaart, who had departed for Feyenoord's under-21 team; Quick Boys and Kloetinge agreed terms to release him from his existing contract.

== Honours ==
=== Manager ===
Kloetinge

- Derde Divisie B: 2025–26
