= Bartłomiej Pacuszka =

Polish footballer

Personal information
- Full name: Bartłomiej Pacuszka
- Date of birth: 25 March 1990 (age 36)
- Place of birth: Warsaw, Poland
- Height: 1.85 m (6 ft 1 in)
- Position: Defender

Youth career
- Agrykola Warsaw
- 2006–2009: Twente/Heracles Almelo

Senior career*
Years	Team	Apps	(Gls)
2009–2010	Twente	0	(0)
2009	→ Heracles Almelo (loan)	1	(0)
2011–2015	Start Otwock	108	(6)
Total		109	(6)

International career
2007	Poland U17	1	(0)
- * Club domestic league appearances and goals

Bartłomiej Pacuszka [ˈbartɛk paˈt͡suʂka] (born 25 March 1990) is a Polish former professional footballer who played as a defender.

In 2006, he joined the Twente/Heracles Almelo joint football academy. In September 2008, he came off the bench during a second-round KNVB Cup match against ADO Den Haag.

On 2 February 2009, he joined Heracles Almelo on loan until the end of the season. On 7 March, he made his Eredivisie debut, appearing in the starting eleven against De Graafschap and playing until the 64th minute.
