= Peter Reekers =

Dutch footballer

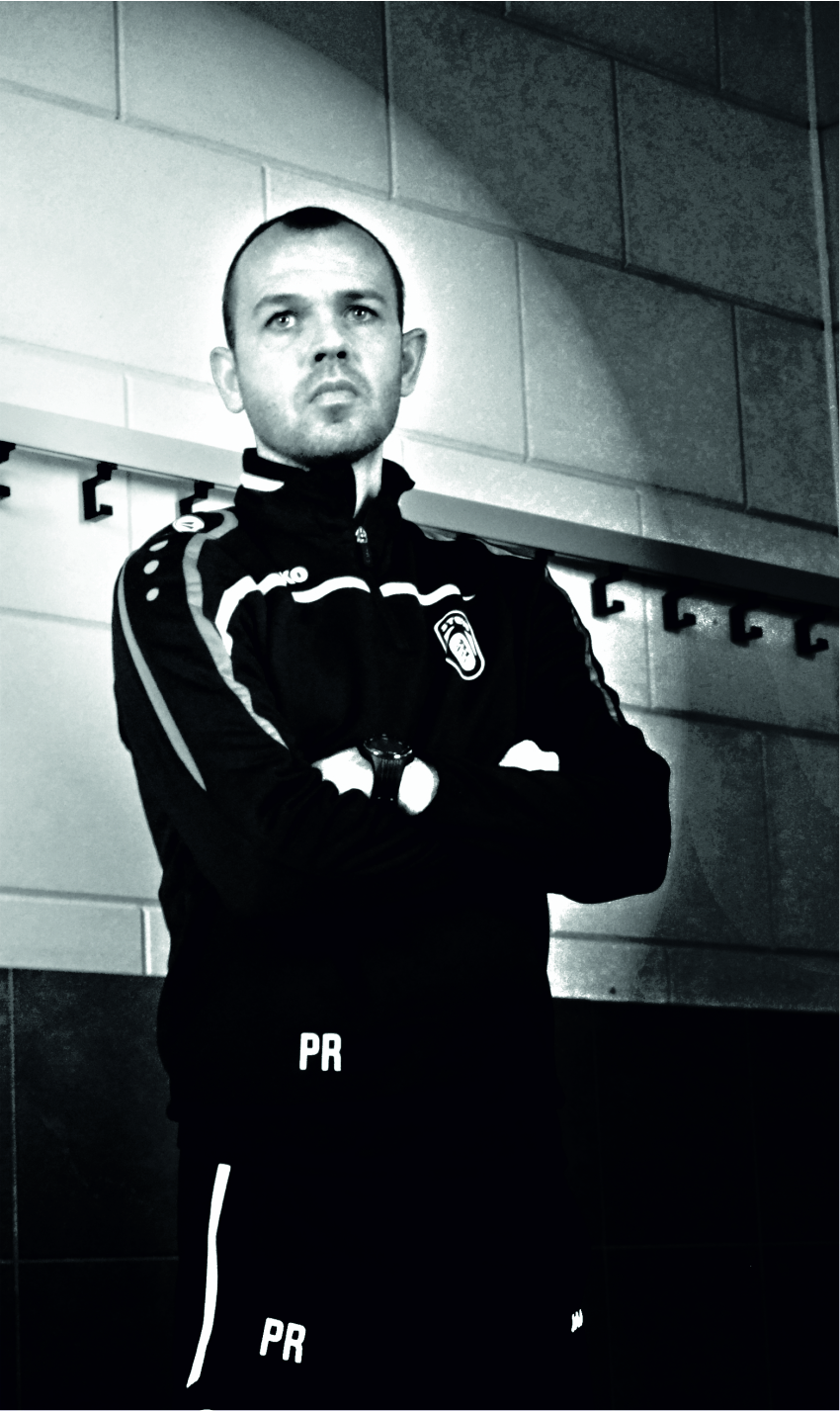
- Reekers in 2015

Personal information
- Date of birth: 2 June 1981 (age 45)
- Place of birth: Westerhaar-Vriezenveensewijk, Netherlands
- Height: 1.84 m (6 ft 0 in)
- Position: Centre-back

Team information
- Current team: Heracles Almelo (assistant)

Youth career
- DETO
- Heracles Almelo

Senior career*
Years	Team	Apps	(Gls)
2000–2007	Heracles Almelo	166	(4)
2007–2009	VVV-Venlo	47	(1)
2009–2011	Heracles Almelo	7	(0)
2011–2013	AGOVV	27	(1)
2013–2015	DETO	8	(0)
Total		252	(6)

Managerial career
- 2014–2015: RKVV STEVO
- 2014–2021: Heracles Almelo (assistant)
- 2016–2020: Jong Heracles
- 2019–2021: Netherlands U-21
- 2021–2023: Heerenveen (assistant)
- 2023–: Heracles Almelo (assistant)
- * Club domestic league appearances and goals

Peter Reekers (born 2 June 1981) is a Dutch professional football coach and former player who serves as the assistant manager of Heracles Almelo.

During his playing career, he played as a central defender for DETO, Heracles Almelo, VVV-Venlo and AGOVV.

== Coaching career ==
In August 2019, Reekers was hired as coach of the Dutch U-21 national team; a position he had to combine with his job as coach of Jong Heracles and assistant coach of the club's first team, Heracles Almelo. A year later, in August 2020, Reekers extended his contract with the KNVB up to and including the final round of the 2021 European Championship. Reekers left his positions at both Heraclas and the national team at the end of the 2020-21 season.

In June 2021, he was appointed assistant coach of SC Heerenveen. In July 2023, he returned to Heracles Almelo as an assistant coach under manager John Lammers.

== Honours ==
=== Player ===
Heracles Almelo

- Eerste Divisie: 2004–05

VVV-Venlo

- Eerste Divisie: 2008–09
