= Cees Keizer =

Dutch footballer

Personal information
- Full name: Cees Cornelis Johannes Keizer
- Date of birth: 8 January 1986 (age 40)
- Place of birth: Volendam, Netherlands
- Height: 1.82 m (6 ft 0 in)
- Position: Midfielder

Youth career
- 1993–2001: Volendam
- 2001–2007: Ajax

Senior career*
Years	Team	Apps	(Gls)
2007–2009	Vitesse	2	(0)
2009	→ Zwolle (loan)	14	(0)
2009–2010	Zwolle	29	(0)
2010–2012	FC Oss	50	(1)
2012–2017	RKAV Volendam		
- * Club domestic league appearances and goals

Cees Keizer (born 8 January 1986) is a Dutch former professional footballer who played as a midfielder. He works as a youth coach with FC Volendam.

== Career ==
Born in Volendam, Keizer played youth football with hometown club FC Volendam before moving to Dutch giants Ajax. He never broke into the first team, and moved to Vitesse, where he made his professional debut in the 2007–08 season. He moved on loan to FC Zwolle in January 2009, before signing a permanent contract in June 2009. Keizer remained a player of Zwolle for a year and a half, after which he left for FC Oss. In 2012, he started playing for his youth club RKAV Volendam.

After his retirement in 2017, Cees started his coaching career at RKAV Volendam. There, he coached the U11 team for three consecutive years and later began working as a youth coach for FC Volendam. He became a UEFA A Youth coach in June 2020.
