= Quick Boys =

Dutch football club

- Full name: Katwijkse Voetbal Vereniging; Quick Boys
- Nickname: Blauw Witte Narren
- Founded: 1 February 1920
- Ground: Nieuw Zuid, Katwijk aan Zee
- Capacity: 8,500
- Chairman: Bart van Kruistum
- Manager: Rogier Veenstra
- League: Tweede Divisie
- 2025–26: Tweede Divisie, 1st of 18 (champions)
Home colours	Away colours

Quick Boys (officially Katwijkse Voetbal Vereniging Quick Boys) is a Dutch football club based in Katwijk aan Zee, South Holland. Founded on 1 February 1920, the club competes in the Tweede Divisie, the third tier of the Dutch football league system. Quick Boys are regarded as one of the most successful amateur sides in the Netherlands, having won numerous national amateur championships and long maintained a fierce local rivalry with neighbours Katwijk in the so-called Katwijk derby.

== History ==
The club joined the football competition in 1921–22, in the Leidsche Voetbal Bond (LVB), the football association for Leiden. The club played in the Sunday league but a ban on entry charges on Sunday caused financial troubles and Quick Boys moved to the new Saturday league.

Quick Boys have played at the highest amateur level since the founding of the club in 1920. The club won 9 titles in the Eerste Klasse, and joined the new Saturday Hoofdklasse in 1996, winning a further four titles. Twenty seasons later it won promotion to the Derde Divisie (formerly Topklasse) for the first time by winning the fourth Hoofdklasse title. After three seasons in the Derde Divisie, Quick Boys promoted to the highest amateur division (Tweede Divisie) after beating OSS '20 and VVSB in the relegation play-offs.

The club reached the quarter-finals of the 2007–08 KNVB Cup.

Former professional footballer Dirk Kuyt started and ended his senior career with the team, playing in 1998 and 2018.

In the 2024–25 KNVB Cup, Quick Boys defeated Eredivisie side Almere City FC 3–0 in the first round, then defeated Fortuna Sittard 3–1 in the second round, before winning against sc Heerenveen in the third round. In the quarter finales, AZ Alkmaar won.

== Current squad ==
As of 24 October 2026

Note: Flags indicate national team as defined under FIFA eligibility rules; some limited exceptions apply. Players may hold more than one non-FIFA nationality.

No.	Pos.	Nation	Player
1	GK	NED	Lars Jansen
2	DF	NED	Joël van Kaam (captain)
3	DF	NED	Sem Kroon
5	DF	NED	Toer Bouwman
6	MF	NED	Leonard de Beste
7	MF	NED	Nick Broekhuizen
8	MF	NED	Jesse Reinders
9	FW	NED	Tren Drexhage
10	MF	NED	Levi van Duijn
11	FW	NED	Lukas Hamann
14	DF	NED	Rano Burger

No.	Pos.	Nation	Player
15	DF	NED	Gregory Kuisch
16	MF	NED	Jouke Vlieland
17	FW	NED	Killian van Mil
19	FW	NED	Senna Westerveld (on loan from ADO Den Haag U21)
20	MF	NED	Frank van den Bosch
21	FW	NED	Kian Slor
22	FW	NED	Ruben Doesburg
23	GK	NED	Quinten van der Helm
25	DF	NED	Ronny Boakye
30	MF	NED	Tom Noordhoff

== Honours ==
The structure of the Hoofdklasse allows Quick Boys three title opportunities in one season: the regular division, the Saturday title and the national title. The overall Saturday title is contested between the champions of the three Saturday divisions, and the national title is contested between the Saturday champion and the Sunday champion. Since 2016, the Hoofdklasse has two divisions for both Saturday and Sunday.

- Division title of the highest amateur league: 13
  - 1945–46, 1952–53, 1954–55, 1955–56, 1957–58, 1959–60, 1961–62, 1990–91, 1991–92, 2002–03, 2003–04, 2024–25, 2025–26
- Division title of the second highest amateur league: 2
  - 2010–11, 2015–16
- National Saturday amateur football title: 9
  - 1945–46, 1952–53, 1957–58, 1959–60, 1961–62, 1990–91, 1991–92, 2003–04, 2015–16
- National amateur football title: 2
  - 1991–92, 2003–04
- KNVB Amateur Cup: 1
  - 1951–52

== Notable players ==
- (Netherlands) Dirk Kuyt
