= Dominique Scholten =

Dutch footballer (born 1988)

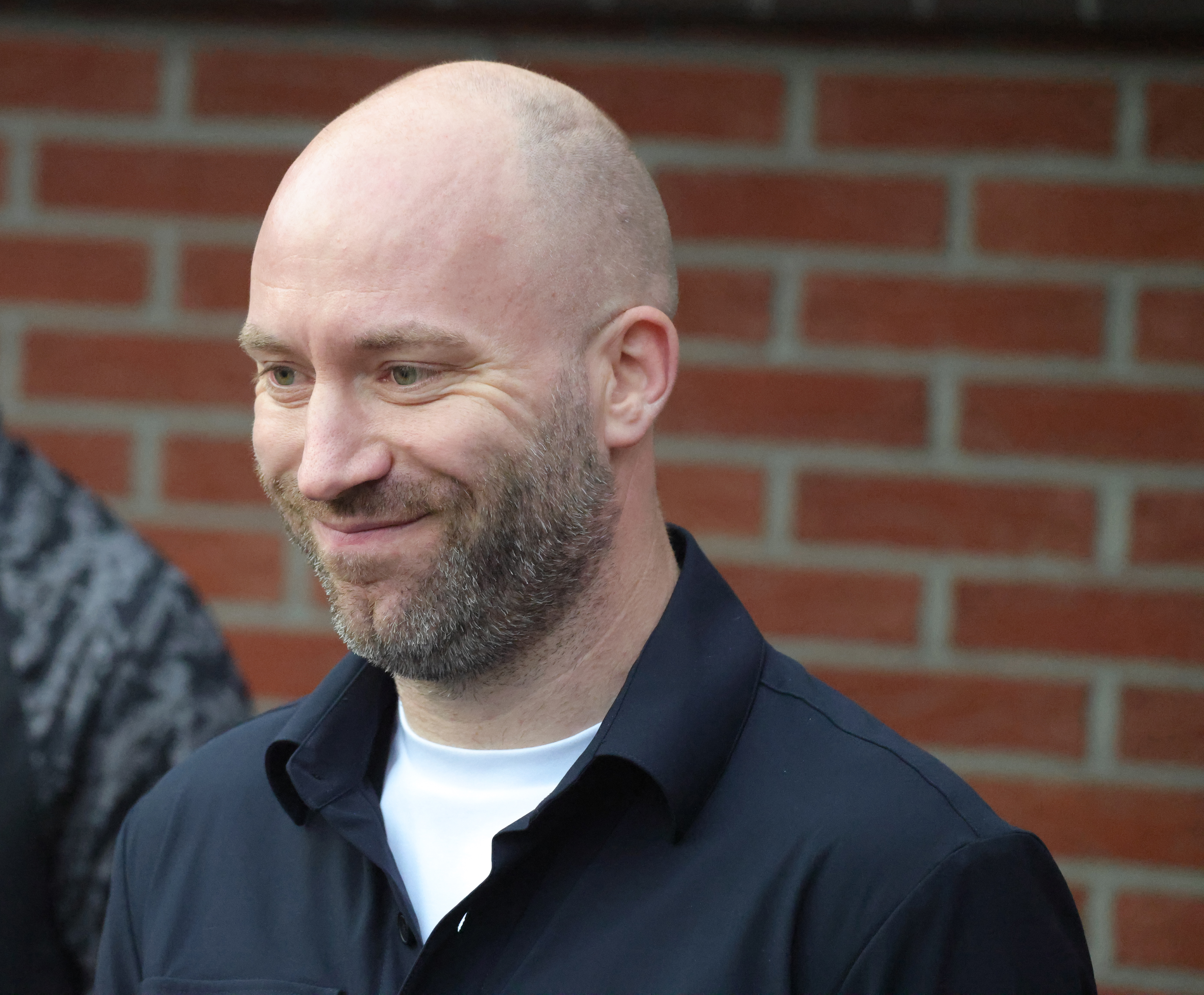

Personal information
- Full name: Dominique Scholten
- Date of birth: 6 April 1988 (age 38)
- Place of birth: Nijmegen, Netherlands
- Height: 1.85 m (6 ft 1 in)
- Position: Midfielder

Team information
- Current team: FC Twente (Chairman)

Youth career
- Noviomagum
- NEC

Senior career*
Years	Team	Apps	(Gls)
2006–2009	NEC	0	(0)
2008–2009	→ FC Oss (loan)	15	(0)
2009–2011	FC Oss	40	(4)
2011–2013	Achilles '29	62	(13)
2013–2016	Spakenburg	64	(3)
2016–2017	JVC Cuijk	11	(0)
2017–2022	BVC '12		
2022–2023	SC Woezik		
- * Club domestic league appearances and goals

Dominique Scholten (born 6 April 1988) is a Dutch footballer who played as a midfielder. He is currently the chairman of FC Twente.

== Playing career ==
Scholten is a midfielder who was born in Nijmegen and made his debut in professional football, being part of the NEC Nijmegen squad in the 2006–07 season.

For the second half of the 2008–09 season, Scholten was on loan at TOP Oss. In May 2009 he signed for three seasons at the club. In June 2011 he had the contract dissolved and he signed a two-year contract with Achilles '29 from Groesbeek. There, he won the title in 2012, making Scholten the first footballer ever to win the Topklasse Sunday twice. The same season, Achilles '29 managed to win the general lower leagues championship after two games against SV Spakenburg. Scholten was a starter in both games. Scholten also won the title in his third season in the Topklasse. This also made him the first player to win the Topklasse Sunday three times.

After his second season in Groesbeek, he signed a two-year deal with SV Spakenburg. In 2016, he moved to JVC Cuijk and a year later to BVC '12.

== Managerial career ==
Scholten played for several years at amateur level in the Netherlands, alongside various jobs at different clubs, working mainly in youth academies.

In the 2006–07 season he started coaching youth teams at his former club NEC. In December 2009, Scholten started his own football academy. Scholten was active as a coach at the NEC/FC Oss academy from 2011. In addition, he worked in sports marketing for NOC/NSF between 2014 and 2017. In the 2016–17 season, he was head of Achilles '29 regional youth academy. In 2017, he became head of youth scouting and general affairs manager at the NEC/FC Oss academy. On 5 February 2020 it was announced that Scholten would become manager of the FC Twente/Heracles Academy from 1 April 2020.

In the summer 2022, Dominique Scholten extended his contract and was promoted to director of the FC Twente/Heracles Academie.

In April 2023, he announced that he had hung up his boots.
