= Cees Toet =

Dutch footballer

Personal information
- Date of birth: 26 September 1987 (age 39)
- Place of birth: The Hague, Netherlands
- Height: 1.83 m (6 ft 0 in)
- Position: Centre back

Team information
- Current team: IJsselmeervogels
- Number: 4

Senior career*
Years	Team	Apps	(Gls)
2007–2009	Sparta Rotterdam	9	(0)
2008–2009	→ RBC Roosendaal (loan)	12	(0)
2009–2011	RBC Roosendaal	74	(8)
2011–2015	Almere City	139	(10)
2015–	IJsselmeervogels	0	(0)
- * Club domestic league appearances and goals as of 11 May 2015 (UTC)

Cees Toet (born 26 September 1987) is a Dutch footballer who plays as a centre back for IJsselmeervogels in the Dutch Topklasse. Born in The Hague, he formerly played in the Eredivisie for Sparta Rotterdam, and the Eerste Divisie for RBC Roosendaal and Almere City He is known as a hard defender who scores relatively often.
