= Nick Kuipers (footballer, born 1988) =

Dutch footballer

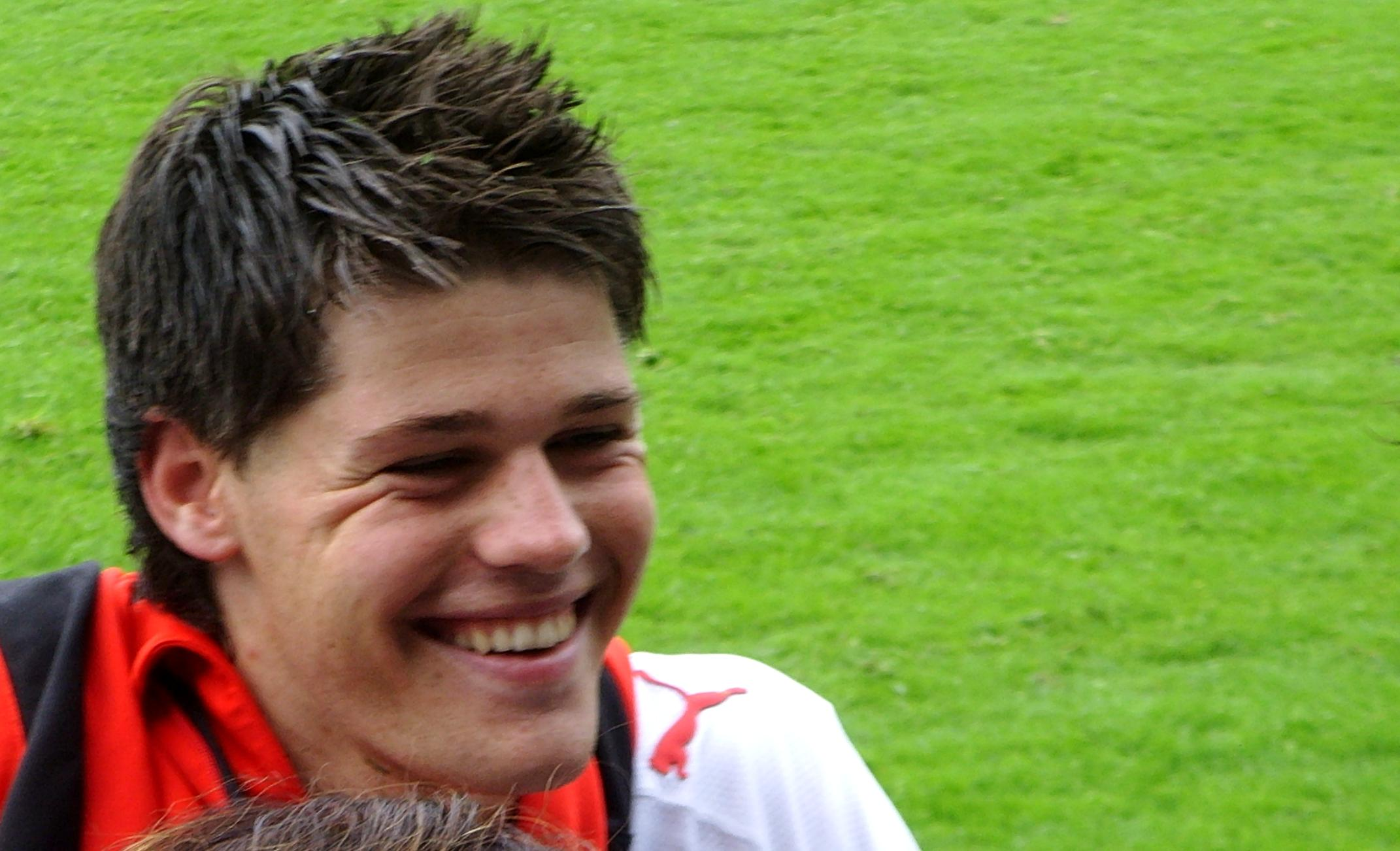

Personal information
- Date of birth: 12 December 1988 (age 37)
- Place of birth: Heemskerk, Netherlands
- Height: 1.83 m (6 ft 0 in)
- Position: Left-back

Team information
- Current team: Go Ahead Kampen

Youth career
- Hollandia T.
- AFC '34
- HFC Haarlem
- –2007: Utrecht

Senior career*
Years	Team	Apps	(Gls)
2007–2009	Utrecht	5	(0)
2009	→ FC Zwolle (loan)	15	(0)
2009–2010	Dordrecht	17	(0)
2010–2011	IJsselmeervogels	30	(4)
2011–2012	Telstar	14	(0)
2012–2015	IJsselmeervogels	75	(9)
2015–2016	Rijnsburgse Boys	26	(2)
2016–2018	ASV De Dijk	39	(0)
2018–2020	ONS Sneek		
2020–	Go Ahead Kampen		
- * Club domestic league appearances and goals as of 18:46, 8 May 2019 (UTC)

Nick Kuipers (Dutch pronunciation: [nɪˈkœypərs]; born 12 December 1988) is a Dutch professional footballer who plays as a left back for Dutch lower league side Go Ahead Kampen.

== Club career ==
=== Early career ===
Kuipers was born in Heemskerk, North Holland. He started playing football, at amateur team Hollandia-T in Tuitjenhorn. Here it was clear that Kuipers had a special talent, and therefore he moved to Saturday-amateur team AFC '34 in Alkmaar, who were one of the bigger amateur teams in Netherlands. HFC Haarlem saw his potential, and signed him for their youth squad. Here, he developed so good, that FC Utrecht, were keen to sign him for their reserve squad. His professional debut was right around the corner.

=== Utrecht ===
On 30 December 2007, Kuipers had his professional debut in a 2–2 draw against Vitesse Arnhem. Since then, Kuipers played occasionally, and he has been a part of FC Utrecht's first squad.

In the beginning of 2009, he signed on loan until the end of the 2008–09 season for FC Zwolle to gain more experience.
