= De Nooijer =

De Nooijer is a Dutch surname. Notable people with the surname include:

- Bradley de Nooijer (born 1997), Dutch footballer
- Dennis de Nooijer (born 1969), Dutch footballer
- Gérard de Nooijer (born 1969), Dutch footballer
- Jeremy de Nooijer (born 1992), Dutch-born Curaçaoan footballer
- Teun de Nooijer (born 1976), Dutch field hockey player
