= Mitchell de Nooijer =

Sint Maarten footballer (born 2000)

Personal information
- Full name: Mitchell Gerrard de Nooijer
- Date of birth: 29 February 2000 (age 26)
- Place of birth: Vlissingen, Netherlands
- Height: 1.87 m (6 ft 2 in)
- Position: Centre-back

Team information
- Current team: Goes
- Number: 21

Senior career*
Years	Team	Apps	(Gls)
–2019	VV Philippine		
2019–2020	Luctor Heinkenszand		
2021	Lokeren		
2021	Huragan Morag	2	(0)
2021–2022	Terneuzense Boys		
2022–	Goes	29	(2)

International career^{‡}
2023–	Sint Maarten	14	(0)
- * Club domestic league appearances and goals as of 4 August 2025 ‡ National team caps and goals as of 22 November 2024

Mitchell Gerrard de Nooijer (born 29 February 2000) is a professional footballer who plays as a centre-back for Goes. Born in Netherlands, he represents Sint Maarten at the international level.

== Career ==
De Nooijer started his career with Dutch side VV Philippine. In 2019, he signed for Dutch side Luctor Heinkenszand. In 2021, he signed for Belgian side KSC Lokeren-Temse. After that, he signed for Polish side Huragan Morag. After that, he signed for Dutch side Terneuzense Boys. In 2022, he signed for Dutch side VV Goes.

De Nooijer is a Sint Maarten international. He is eligible to represent Sint Maarten internationally through his grandmother. He debuted for the Sint Maarten national football team in March 2023. He played in the CONCACAF Nations League for the team.

== Personal life ==
De Nooijer was born on 29 February 2000 in Vlissingen, Netherlands. He is a native of Vlissingen, Netherlands. He is the son of Dutch footballer Dennis de Nooijer. He is the younger brother of Curaçao international Jeremy de Nooijer. They are the cousins of Bradley de Nooijer and the nephews of Gérard de Nooijer.

De Nooijer mainly operates as a defender and has operated as a midfielder. He studied marketing and communications.
