= Dennis de Nooijer =

Dutch football player and manager (born 1969)

Personal information
- Date of birth: 4 April 1969 (age 57)
- Place of birth: Oost-Souburg, Netherlands
- Height: 1.84 m (6 ft 0 in)
- Position: Striker

Team information
- Current team: Kozakken Boys (head coach)

Youth career
- –1985: RCS
- 1985–1988: Sparta Rotterdam

Senior career*
Years	Team	Apps	(Gls)
1987–1998	Sparta Rotterdam	244	(65)
1998–2002	Heerenveen	31	(4)
2000–2001	→ Sparta Rotterdam (loan)	8	(0)
2001–2002	→ NEC (loan)	16	(6)
2002–2004	NEC	25	(4)
2003–2004	→ Sparta Rotterdam (loan)	17	(2)
2004–2005	Dordrecht	21	(6)

Managerial career
- 2005–2007: Zaamslag
- 2010–2011: Walcheren
- 2011–2012: RCS
- 2014–2015: Twente (youth)
- 2014–2016: Netherlands U16 (assistant)
- 2015–2017: Philippine
- 2015–2016: Dordrecht (youth)
- 2016–2017: Telstar (assistant)
- 2017–2018: Zeelandia Middelburg
- 2018: Hoek
- 2019: Dalian Istar H&C (youth)
- 2020: Roeselare (assistant)
- 2021–2022: Terneuzense Boys
- 2022–2025: Goes
- 2025–2026: SteDoCo
- 2026–: Kozakken Boys
- * Club domestic league appearances and goals

Dennis de Nooijer (born 4 April 1969) is a Dutch professional football manager and former player who is the head coach of Tweede Divisie club Kozakken Boys. A striker during his playing career, he is the twin brother of defender Gérard de Nooijer, who also played professional football during the late 1980s and 1990s.

== Playing career ==
Dennis de Nooijer was born on 4 April 1969 in Oost-Souburg, Zeeland, Netherlands, and is the elder of a set of twins. His twin brother, Gérard de Nooijer, also became a professional footballer. The brothers' careers often ran parallel.

De Nooijer began his career in the youth academy of Sparta Rotterdam, making his debut for the senior team during the 1987–88 season, replacing Robin Schmidt in the 72nd minute of a 1–0 home loss to AZ Alkmaar on 1 April 1988. In the 1992–93 season, he suffered a severe left knee injury that sidelined him for seven months. He returned the following season but experienced another setback in 1994–95, tearing the outer cruciate ligament in his right knee.

Midway through the 1990s, De Nooijer's performances attracted interest from prominent clubs, including Celtic, Benfica, Ajax, and Feyenoord, and he entered negotiations with some of them. Despite this, in 1996, he made the surprising decision to extend his contract with Sparta for four years. The renewal was supported by a financial boost from kit sponsor Kappa, which also offered post-career roles for both Dennis and Gérard.

In 1998, Dennis and Gérard joined Heerenveen. Dennis was expected to replace Ruud van Nistelrooy, who had transferred to PSV, but injuries hampered his performances. In his first season, he managed just three goals in 17 appearances. During the following season, he was severely injured, making only one appearance. When Heerenveen qualified for the UEFA Champions League after finishing second in the Eredivisie, De Nooijer was sidelined for five months. Upon his return, coach Foppe de Haan preferred other players, including Marcus Allbäck and Romano Denneboom, leading to De Nooijer being loaned to Sparta. Under coach Willem van Hanegem, he helped Sparta avoid relegation despite the club finishing 17th.

De Nooijer returned to Heerenveen for the following season but made only three substitute appearances in the first half of the campaign. He was subsequently loaned to NEC, where coach Johan Neeskens gave him another chance as a striker. In March 2002, Heerenveen announced they would not renew his contract. De Nooijer then signed a one-year deal with NEC. In his third season with the club, a change in playing style saw him lose his place to Frank Demouge, prompting a move. Sparta, recently relegated from the Eredivisie for the first time in its history, re-signed him, but he was unable to help them achieve promotion.

In the summer of 2004, Dennis and Gérard de Nooijer decided to end their professional careers at the same club, Sparta. When Sparta declined, they joined Dordrecht, where they played until the summer of 2005. After retiring from professional football, the brothers transitioned to amateur club RCS in Oost-Souburg. Since the 2017–18 season, they have been playing together again at SV Apollo '69 in the Vierde Klasse.

== Managerial and coaching career ==
In 2004, De Nooijer established and became co-owner of the football academy JVOZ (Jeugd Voetbal Opleiding Zeeland) alongside his brother Gérard and Dolf Roks. He also continued playing at the amateur level for VV Philippine while coaching youth teams at his own academy.

In October 2005, De Nooijer began his managerial career as the head coach of Tweede Klasse club Zaamslag. In 2010, he became the head coach of Vierde Klasse club Walcheren. However, on 10 December 2010, he announced his departure, citing a desire to coach at a higher level. Six days later, he was appointed head coach of his former youth club, RCS, which was set to compete in the Eerste Klasse from the following season.

In 2014, De Nooijer began working in the youth department of Twente and joined the coaching staff of the Netherlands U16 national team.

In April 2015, De Nooijer was announced as the new head coach of VV Philippine, a club based in the village of Philippine in Zeelandic Flanders, where he had also played after his retirement from professional football. The following month, in May 2015, he also took on the role of youth coach at Dordrecht. To pursue this new role, De Nooijer began UEFA Youth Elite A course, which he could no longer combine with his position as assistant coach of the Netherlands U16 national team. As a result, he ended his involvement with the U16 team. In his first season at Philippine, 2015–16, he led the club to a championship in the Vierde Klasse. In his second season, 2016–17, he combined his head coaching duties with Philippine with a role as assistant coach to Michel Vonk at Eerste Divisie club Telstar. However, shortly after the winter break, he resigned from his position at Telstar, citing discomfort in his role as an assistant coach. After announcing that he would not extend his contract with Philippine, De Nooijer signed on as head coach of Tweede Klasse club Zeelandia Middelburg for the 2017–18 season. In October 2017, he also took on the role of forwards coach at Dordrecht, reuniting with his brother Gérard, the head coach.

In January 2018, De Nooijer was appointed head coach of Derde Divisie side Hoek. In November 2018, he and his brother left Dordrecht following Gérard’s dismissal as head coach. In December 2019, De Nooijer was relieved of his duties at Hoek, with chairman Art van der Staal citing a lack of mutual trust, including the failure to adhere to agreed-upon terms. De Nooijer believed his decision to give the squad a break that week, despite their strong third-place position, contributed to the tension, as the chairman insisted on training. Assistant coach Giovanni Siereveld resigned in solidarity with De Nooijer.

In February 2019, he began working as a youth coach in China for Dalian Istar H&C, again following in his brother's footsteps.

In July 2020, he was appointed assistant coach to Karel Fraeye at Roeselare in the Belgian Division 1. However, the club declared bankruptcy in September 2020.

In March 2021, De Nooijer was appointed head coach of Terneuzense Boys ahead of the 2021–22 season. In January 2022, De Nooijer announced his move to Goes, who had been relegated to the Vierde Divisie prior to his appointment in the summer of 2022. Under his leadership, the team achieved promotion back to the Derde Divisie in 2024.

In December 2024, De Nooijer was appointed head coach of SteDoCo, another club in the Derde Divisie, ahead of the 2025–26 season. In November 2025, he announced that he would leave the club at the end of the season, citing the absence of a contract extension offer.

In January 2026, De Nooijer was announced as the head coach of Tweede Divisie club Kozakken Boys from the 2026–27 season. With SteDoCo's results having declined—the club had won only once in roughly three months and slipped to 11th in the Derde Divisie—he and his assistant Hans Bos were dismissed with immediate effect on 16 February 2026, with twelve league matches still to play; technical director Cees Lagendijk and Gert-Jan Koekkoek took over for the remainder of the season.

== Personal life ==
De Nooijer is the twin brother of former professional footballer Gérard de Nooijer, with whom he has frequently collaborated during their overlapping playing and managerial careers. His sons, Jeremy (born 1992) and Mitchell (born 2000), as well as his nephews, Bradley (born 1997) and Yanilio (born 2003), are also professional footballers.
