= Paterne Boula Bi Boula =

Ivorian footballer

Personal information
- Full name: Paterne Boula Bi Boula
- Date of birth: February 25, 1983 (age 43)
- Place of birth: Abidjan, Ivory Coast
- Height: 1.73 m (5 ft 8 in)
- Position: Defender

Youth career
- –2002: Toumodi FC

Senior career*
Years	Team	Apps	(Gls)
2003–2005	Toumodi FC	58	(2)
2005–2008	Olympic Charleroi	56	(0)
2008–2009	Union SG	2	(0)
2009–2010	Hoek		
- * Club domestic league appearances and goals

Paterne Boula Bi Boula (born 25 February 1983) is an Ivorian former footballer who played as a defender.

== Career ==
Bi Boula began his career with Toumodi FC. He joined R.O.C. de Charleroi-Marchienne in Belgium in 2005. He left Charleroi in the summer of 2008 and joined R. Union Saint-Gilloise. After just one year with R. Union Saint-Gilloise, he left on 1 July 2009 the club and signed with HSV Hoek in the Netherlands. He left Hoek in the winter-break of the 2009–10 season.
