= Jeremy de Nooijer =

Curaçaoan footballer (born 1992)

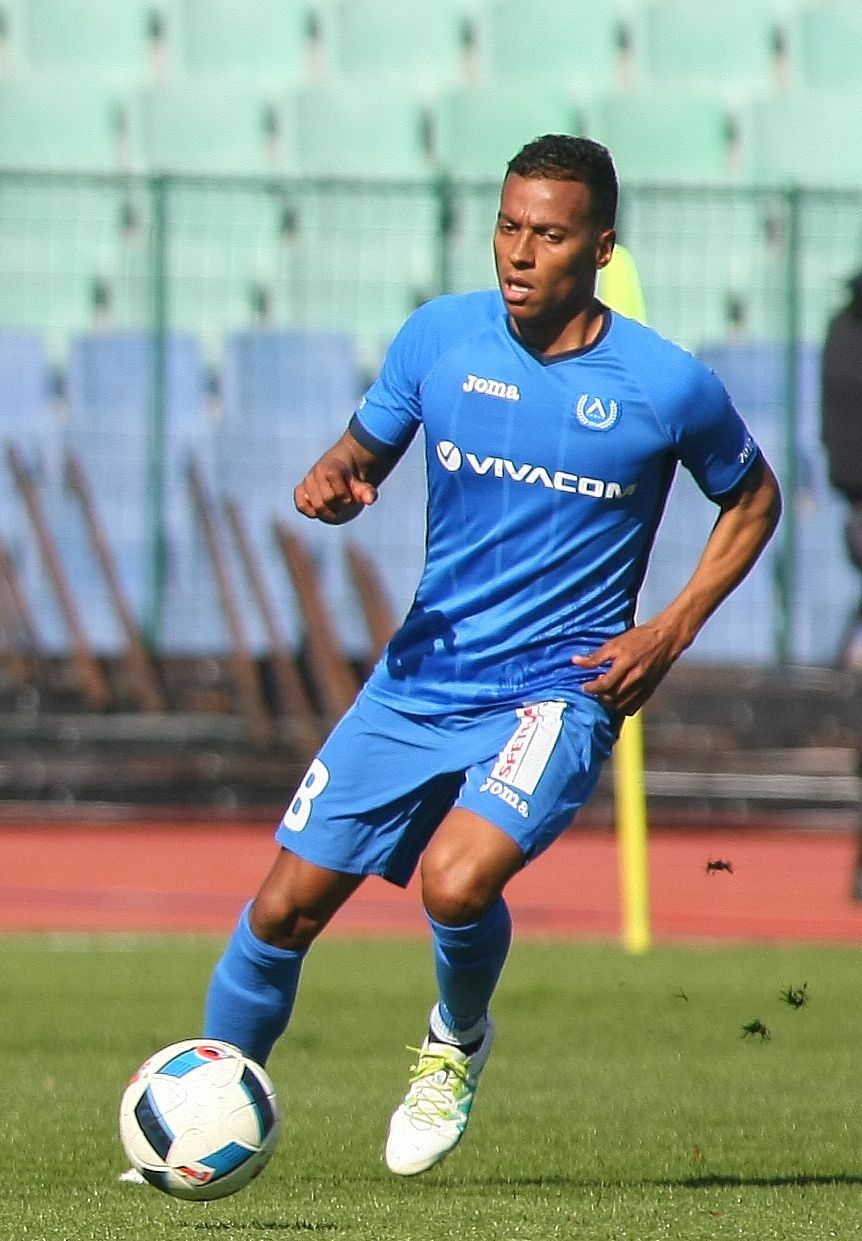

Personal information
- Date of birth: 15 March 1992 (age 34)
- Place of birth: Vlissingen, Netherlands
- Height: 1.80 m (5 ft 11 in)
- Position: Midfielder

Team information
- Current team: Goes
- Number: 22

Youth career
- Heerenveense Boys
- Heerenveen
- RCS
- JVOZ
- Sparta Rotterdam

Senior career*
Years	Team	Apps	(Gls)
2012–2015	Sparta Rotterdam	62	(2)
2015–2017	Levski Sofia	50	(1)
2017–2018	Sheriff Tiraspol	23	(1)
2019	Sūduva	8	(0)
2019–2023	Al-Shamal	28	(0)
2024–	Goes	23	(4)

International career
2015–2021	Curaçao	15	(0)
- * Club domestic league appearances and goals as of 17:37, 4 August 2025 (UTC)

Jeremy de Nooijer (born 15 March 1992) is a professional footballer who plays as a midfielder for Goes. Born in the Netherlands, he plays for the Curaçao national team.

== Career ==
In September 2011, De Nooijer received his first call into the Sparta Rotterdam senior squad, when he was an unused substitute for a 1–0 Eerste Divisie win over Den Bosch. He made his competitive debut in a 2–1 league defeat to Veendam on 21 December 2012. De Nooijer scored his first Sparta goal against Den Bosch in a 7–1 win on 26 October 2013. He left Sparta at the end of the 2014–15 campaign making a total of 62 league appearances, scoring two goals.

On 29 June 2015, De Nooijer signed a two-year contract with Bulgarian side Levski Sofia. He made his A Group debut in a 1–1 away draw against Botev Plovdiv on 18 July. He left in May 2017 after his contract was not renewed.

On 5 March 2019, de Nooijer joined Lithuanian club FK Sūduva Marijampolė. He played eight league games for the club, before his contract was terminated by mutual consent on 15 May 2019.

In June 2019, de Nooijer signed a one-year contract with Qatari club Al-Shamal SC, with an option for another year.

== Personal life ==
De Nooijer is the son of former footballer Dennis de Nooijer, the nephew of Gérard de Nooijer, brother of Mitchell de Nooijer, and the cousin of Bradley de Nooijer. He is of Dutch, Curaçaoan and Sint Maartener descent.

== Statistics ==
As of 20 December 2015

Club performance			League		Cup		Continental		Total	
Club	League	Season	Apps	Goals	Apps	Goals	Apps	Goals	Apps	Goals
Netherlands			League		KNVB Cup		Europe		Total	
Sparta Rotterdam	Eerste Divisie	2011–12	0	0	0	0	–		0	0
Sparta Rotterdam	Eerste Divisie	2012–13	7	0	0	0	–		7	0
Sparta Rotterdam	Eerste Divisie	2013–14	24	1	0	0	–		24	1
Sparta Rotterdam	Eerste Divisie	2014–15	31	1	1	0	–		32	1
Sparta Rotterdam	Sparta Total		62	2	1	0	0	0	63	2
Bulgaria			League		Bulgarian Cup		Europe		Total	
Levski Sofia	A Group	2015–16	19	1	3	0	–		22	1
Levski Sofia	Levski Total		19	1	3	0	0	0	22	1
Career statistics			81	3	4	0	0	0	85	3

== Honours ==
=== International ===
Curaçao

- Caribbean Cup: 2017
