= Kenny Verhoene =

Belgian football manager and former player (born 1973)

Personal information
- Date of birth: 15 April 1973 (age 53)
- Place of birth: Ghent, Belgium
- Height: 1.91 m (6 ft 3 in)
- Position: Centre-back

Senior career*
Years	Team	Apps	(Gls)
–1994	KSK Lovendegem		
1994–1997	Gent	17	(1)
1997–1998	Sint-Truiden	16	(3)
1998–2001	Harelbeke	54	(8)
2001–2002	Crystal Palace	0	(0)
2002–2003	Kortrijk		
2003–2004	Red Star Waasland		
2004–2006	Oudenaarde		

Managerial career
- 2009–2012: VV Zaamslag
- 2012: Sporting Sint-Gillis Waas
- 2012–2015: HSV Hoek
- 2015–2016: Carl Zeiss Jena (youth)
- 2018–2019: Carl Zeiss Jena II
- 2019–2020: Carl Zeiss Jena (youth)
- 2020: Carl Zeiss Jena (caretaker)
- 2021–: Union Fürstenwalde
- * Club domestic league appearances and goals

Kenny Verhoene (born 15 April 1973) is a Belgian professional football manager and former player who is the head coach of NOFV-Oberliga Nord club Union Fürstenwalde.

== Playing career ==
Verhoene started his football career in his native Belgium, playing for Gent, Sint-Truiden and Harelbeke in the 1990s. In 2001, he moved to Crystal Palace, but returned after one season, signing with Kortrijk. Stints with Red Star Waasland and Oudenaarde followed, before retiring in 2006.

== Managerial career ==
=== Early career ===
In 2009, Verhoene was appointed head coach of Dutch Tweede Klasse club VV Zaamslag, leading them to promotion to the Eerste Klasse in his first season in charge. He moved to Sporting Sint-Gillis-Waas in the First Provincial in August 2012, before returning to the Netherlands where he joined HSV Hoek in November 2012.

=== Carl Zeiss Jena ===
In June 2015, after three years of being in charge of Hoek, Verhoene was appointed coach of the Carl Zeiss Jena U21 and U19 teams, focusing on transition to the first team which at the time competed in the Regionalliga Nordost. From 2016 to 2019, he was the sporting director of the club, before returning to the position as U19 team coach. He had at that point already coached the Carl Zeiss Jena reserve team competing in the NOFV-Oberliga Süd for the first half of the 2018–19 season.

In February 2020, in addition to his position as U19 coach, he was appointed head coach the Carl Zeiss Jena first team, who were in a relegation battle in the 3. Liga. Unlike interim coach René Klingbeil, Verhoene had the necessary coaching license. On 6 May 2020, Verhoene was relieved of his duties as manager of the club's U19 team, after accusations of "terror, dictatorship and oppression". He was succeeded by Tobias Werner as sports director the following day.

=== Union Fürstenwalde ===
Verhoene was appointed head coach of Regionalliga Nordost club Union Fürstenwalde on 25 November 2021. The club suffered relegation to the NOFV-Oberliga Nord in his first season in charge, but the club announced in June 2022 that Verhoene would stay on as head coach.
