= Arvid Smit =

Dutch footballer (born 1980)

Personal information
- Full name: Arvid Benjamin Smit
- Date of birth: 12 December 1980 (age 45)
- Place of birth: Heerhugowaard, Netherlands
- Height: 1.83 m (6 ft 0 in)
- Position: Midfielder

Team information
- Current team: England women (assistant)

Youth career
- Kolping Boys
- ADO '20
- DEM
- Haarlem

Senior career*
Years	Team	Apps	(Gls)
1999–2001	Telstar	66	(8)
2002	→ De Graafschap (loan)	12	(1)
2002–2007	PSV	0	(0)
2002–2003	→ De Graafschap (loan)	26	(4)
2003–2004	→ Groningen (loan)	29	(5)
2005–2006	→ Willem II (loan)	35	(6)
2007	→ Marítimo (loan)	13	(1)
2007–2008	Marítimo	0	(0)
2008	→ União Leiria (loan)	12	(0)
2008–2009	Volendam	11	(0)
2009–2011	Telstar	20	(2)
Total		224	(27)

Managerial career
- 2017–2019: Telstar (assistant)
- 2017–2019: DEM
- 2019–2025: Netherlands women (assistant)
- 2025-: England women (assistant)
- * Club domestic league appearances and goals

Arvid Benjamin Smit (born 12 December 1980) is a Dutch football coach and former professional footballer who played as a midfielder. He is the assistant coach for the England women's national team.

== Career ==
Smit was born in Heerhugowaard, North Holland. After impressing with Telstar in the second division, he was signed by country giants PSV Eindhoven in 2002, but would appear very rarely officially for his new team and never in the Eredivisie, going on to serve three loans in the country, always in the top flight.

In January 2007, still owned by PSV, Smit moved to Portugal's C.S. Marítimo, making his first appearance on the 29th in the local derby of Madeira against C.D. Nacional. After a good spell – he started in all the Primeira Liga games during the season, completing all but one – the move was made permanent, but he was deemed surplus to requirements shortly after, which prompted a new January move, also in the country, as he joined (on loan) U.D. Leiria.

Smit returned to his country in the 2008 summer, signing with top-level side FC Volendam. After having appeared sparingly throughout the campaign, he dropped down a category and returned to his first professional club, Telstar, retiring from professional football in July 2011 at the age of 30.
