= Angelo Nijskens =

Dutch footballer

Personal information
- Date of birth: 1 June 1963 (age 63)
- Place of birth: Netherlands
- Height: 1.84 m (6 ft 0 in)
- Position: Forward

Senior career*
Years	Team	Apps	(Gls)
-1988	Sporting Lokeren		
1988-1989	KFC Uerdingen 05	17	(5)
1989-1991	Liège	37	(7)
1991-1992	Sporting Charleroi	3	(0)
1992-1993	Sporting Lokeren	8	(2)
1993-1995	Alemannia Aachen	38	(12)
- HSV Hoek

Managerial career
- 2019: SK Wachtebeke
- * Club domestic league appearances and goals

Angelo Nijskens (born 1 June 1963) is a Dutch former professional footballer who played as a forward.

== Career ==
Born in the Netherlands, Nijskens started his career as an attacker in the youth team at HVV '24 and at the age of fifteen went to KSC Lokeren where he joined the first team in 1982. In the 1988-89 season he played for Bayer 05 Uerdingen and then between 1989 and 1991 he played for RFC de Liège, with whom he won the Belgian Cup in 1990. In the 1991–92 season Nijskens played for Sporting Charleroi and in the 1992–93 season he again played for Lokeren, before joining Alemannia Aachen in 1993. In the 1995–96 season, he played for Red Star Haasdonk, before he left for HSV Hoek where he became a player trainer. He was fired in February 2002.

Nijskens also had to leave prematurely at KV Kortrijk, SV Oudenaarde and KFC Eeklo. In 2008, he trained WS Lauwe, after which he became a scout and youth coach at Kortrijk. In 2012, he trained HSV Hoek and worked in a media library in Ghent. Since the end of 2014 he has been a trainer at 4th grader SK Berlare.

On 5 December 2019, his contract as head coach of SK Wachtebeke was terminated by the club after getting only 5 points in 7 matches.
