= Rousseau De Poorter =

Footballer (born 2001)

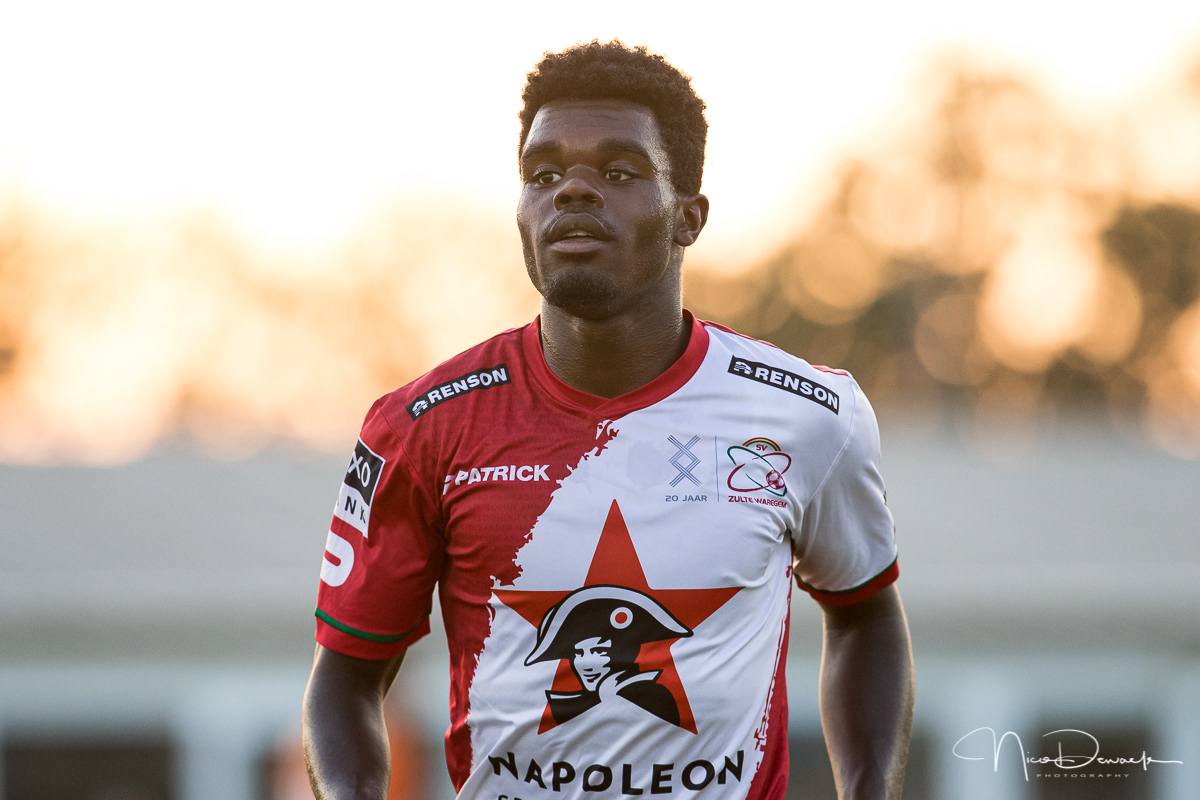
- De Poorter with Zulte Waregem in 2021

Personal information
- Full name: Rousseau Lefevre De Poorter
- Date of birth: 1 October 2001 (age 25)
- Place of birth: Tabarre, Haiti
- Position: Right-back

Team information
- Current team: HSV Hoek
- Number: 2

Youth career
- 2007–2011: Ooidonk Leerne
- 2011–2015: Deinze
- 2015–2016: Cercle Brugge
- 2016–2018: Lokeren
- 2018–2019: Anderlecht
- 2019–2021: Zulte Waregem

Senior career*
| Years | Team | Apps | (Gls) |
| 2021–2022 | Zulte Waregem | 1 | (0) |
| 2022–2024 | Deinze | 2 | (0) |
| 2023 | → Juventud Torremolinos (loan) | 12 | (1) |
| 2023–2024 | → Knokke (loan) | 20 | (0) |
| 2024–2025 | Sparta Petegem | 28 | (5) |
| 2025– | HSV Hoek | 43 | (6) |

International career
| 2017 | Belgium U16 | 4 | (0) |
| 2018 | Belgium U17 | 6 | (0) |
- * Club domestic league appearances and goals as of 19:25, 24 October 2026 (UTC)

Rousseau Lefevre De Poorter (born 1 October 2001) is a professional footballer who plays as a right-back for Tweede Divisie club HSV Hoek. Born in Haiti, he has represented Belgium at youth international level.

== Club career ==
De Poorter is a former youth academy player of Cercle Brugge, Lokeren and Anderlecht. In June 2019, Anderlecht announced that he would join U21 team of Zulte Waregem. He made his professional debut for the club on 7 August 2021 in a 3–1 league win against Sint-Truiden.

In May 2022, De Poorter signed a two-year contract with Deinze.

On 14 August 2023, De Poorter was loaned out to Belgian National Division 1 side Knokke for the next season.

== International career ==
De Poorter has represented Belgium at youth level. He has played friendlies for Belgium under-16 and under-17 national teams.

In June 2021, Haiti national team coach Jean-Jacques Pierre named De Poorter in the preliminary squad for the 2021 CONCACAF Gold Cup.

== Personal life ==
Born in Haiti, De Poorter was adopted by a Belgian family and moved to Belgium when he was three months old.

== Career statistics ==
=== Club ===
As of 7 August 2021

| Club | Season | League | | | Cup | | Continental | | Total | |
| Club | Season | Division | Apps | Goals | Apps | Goals | Apps | Goals | Apps | Goals |
|---|---|---|---|---|---|---|---|---|---|---|
| Zulte Waregem | 2021–22 | Belgian First Division A | 1 | 0 | 0 | 0 | — | | 1 | 0 |
| Career total | | | 1 | 0 | 0 | 0 | 0 | 0 | 1 | 0 |
