= John Goossens =

Dutch footballer (born 1988)

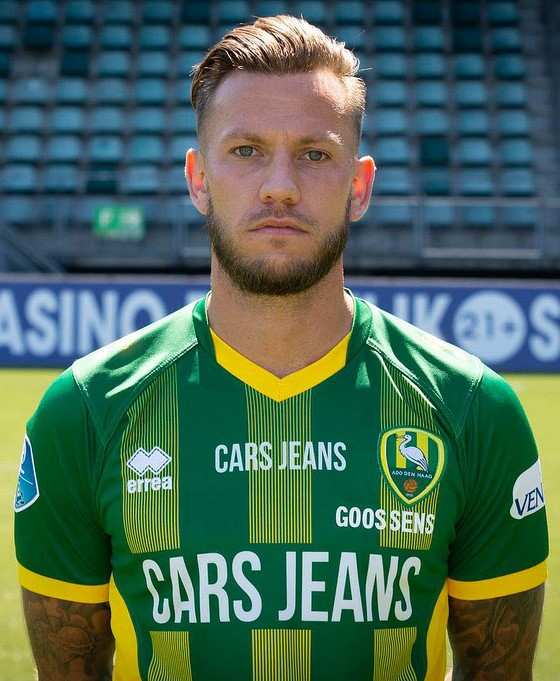
- Goossens in 2018

Personal information
- Date of birth: 25 July 1988 (age 38)
- Place of birth: Heemstede, Netherlands
- Height: 1.74 m (5 ft 9 in)
- Position: Midfielder

Youth career
- 1997–1999: SV HBC
- 1999–2006: Ajax

Senior career*
Years	Team	Apps	(Gls)
2006–2009	Jong Ajax		
2009–2012	NEC	72	(14)
2012–2014	Feyenoord	30	(3)
2014	Pune City	4	(1)
2015–2016	Voluntari	14	(1)
2016–2018	Chicago Fire	25	(3)
2018–2021	ADO Den Haag	68	(5)
Total		213	(38)

International career
2005–2006	Netherlands U17	13	(5)
2010	Netherlands U21	3	(1)
Medal record
Representing Netherlands
UEFA European Under-17 Championship
Runner-up	Italy 2005	U-17 Team
- * Club domestic league appearances and goals

John Goossens (born 25 July 1988) is a Dutch former professional footballer who mainly played as a defensive midfielder, although he was capable of playing in several positions in midfield, and even as a left winger. Since his retirement from football in 2022, he has worked as a financial counsellor for professional footballers.

He began his career with NEC in the Eredivisie in 2009, after arriving from the famed Ajax academy, before moving to Feyenoord in 2012, where he played for two seasons. After leaving the club in 2014, he spent four years abroad with Indian club Pune City, Romanian club Voluntari and Major League Soccer's Chicago Fire. He returned to the Netherlands in 2018, ending his career with ADO Den Haag.

At international level, Goossens has also represented the Netherlands at U17 and U21 levels, scoring two goals at the 2005 FIFA U-17 World Championship with the former and finishing in third place at the tournament.

== Club career ==
Born in Heemstede, Goossens began his career at the local SV HBC, then joined Ajax in September 1999, and was promoted to Jong Ajax in November 2006 and signed a new contract later in May 2007, that will keep him until 2011. In the 2008–09 season, he played left back in that team, where he had previously acted as left winger. However, under the management of Marco van Basten, Goossens was told that he doesn't have a future at Ajax no longer. While at Ajax, Goossens was described as "super talented".

=== NEC Nijmegen ===
==== 2009–2010 ====
On 2 February 2009, Goossens moved from Ajax to NEC Nijmegen, where he signed a contract for four years. Previously moving to NEC, FC Twente originally keen to sign Goosens. Both parties already agreed with Goossens, but could with Ajax not agree on the terms of the contract. Ajax wanted the contract to include a repurchase option, to which Twente ceased negotiations. Goossens signed a contract until mid- 2012 in Nijmegen.

He made his professional football debut on 4 February 2009, playing his first game against Groningen, where he came on as a substitute for Rachid Bouaouzan in the 29th minute. Goossens then scored his first goal for the club, in a 1–1 draw against Twente on 3 April 2009. In his first half to his career at NEC, Goossens made eight appearances and scoring once.

In the 2009–10 season, Goossens started his full season at NEC when he wasn't used and was on the bench at the start of the season before he scored his first goal of the season, in a 1–1 draw against ADO Den Haag. A week later, on 28 October 2009, in the third round of KNVB Cup, in a 2–1 win over Excelsior. Then, he scored his second league goal of the season, in a 4–3 loss against Twente two months later. Then in the fourth round of KNVB Cup, Goossens then scored, in a 2–0 win over Groningen. During a friendly match against Pelister, Goossens damaged his left ankle that left him out between four and six weeks. He made his return, in a 2–0 loss to Groningen on 20 February 2010. Goossens then scored his third goal of the season, in a 4–1 loss to Heerenveen on 20 March 2010. At the end of the season, Goossens scored five goals in twenty-four appearances in all competitions. One of his goal this season resulted Goossens being awarded for Goal of the season.

==== 2010–2012 ====
In the 2010–11 season, Goossens started his season when he scored his goal of the season, when he scored in a 3–1 loss against PSV on 11 September 2010. Despite being on the losing side, Goossens was named by Algemeen Dagblad as the team of the week. Then, in the third round of KNVB Cup against Dordrecht, Goossens was sent-off after a straight red card in the 45th minute, which NEC lost 4–3. After the match, Goossens was given a three match ban, which lead the club appealed. As a result, Goossens was suspended on one match. The appeal would later become successful. He then scored his second goal of the season, in a 3–1 win over Willem II on 11 December 2010, followed up his third goal on 22 January 2011, in a 2–2 draw against NAC Breda. He then scored his fourth and fifth goal against Utrecht and Vitesse Arnhem. The next game after Vitesse, Goossens scored twice, in a 4–1 win over VVV-Venlo. At the end of the 2010–11 season, Goossens scored seven goals in thirteen appearances. The club started negotiation a new contract for Goossens, whose contract expire at the end of the 2011–12 season.

In 2011–12 season, Goossens appeared in two matches before being sidelined with a knee injury which he sustained during a match. Goossens made his return, in a 3–0 loss against Ajax, where he made a start, only to be substituted for 25 minutes after injuring his ankle. Goossens would score twice from a direct free kick, in a 2–0 win over VVV-Venlo. After the match, Goossens never practice taking free kick. Goossens then scored four days later, in the fourth round of KNVB Cup, in a 3–0 win over Achilles '29 (III). His third goal of the season came in a 4–0 win over Groningen on 25 February 2012. Soon after, Goossens ended his season and his career at NEC when he had a knee surgery and kept him for eight weeks.

Due to his good performance for NEC Nijmegen, Goossens was offered a new contract in 2012, but he rejected the offer. Welsh side Swansea City were interested in signing Goossens. This led to the club's technical director Carlos Aalbers admitted he had mixed feelings over midfielder John Goossens' proposed move to the club. NEC stated they do not want to risk losing Goossens on a free transfer in the summer. Eventually, Goossens rejected a move to Swansea as he had decided to serve the remainder of his contract.

=== Feyenoord ===
Two weeks later, Feyenoord managed to sign him on a free transfer at the end of the season. Eventually, Goossens agreed to join Feyenoord on a four-year deal. The club's technical director Martin van Geel said: "We are delighted that Goossens has chosen Feyenoord." On 25 June 2012, Goossens was fit when he appeared at the club's first training sessions of the season. Goossens made his Feyenoord debut when they played in a friendly match against FC Horst on 10 July 2012, which he played for an hour. However, Goossen's career at Feyenoord career didn't a good start after he wasn't fit, with recurring injury around him.

After three months at the club, Goossens made his debut for the club on 21 October 2012, where he set up the second goal in the match for Feyenoord, in a 3–2 win over VVV-Venlo. However, for the second time this season, Goossens was out for a month with a knee injury. Following his return, Goossens scored his first goals for Feyernood, in a 6–0 win over Heracles, as well as, making two assists, on 28 April 2013. Goossens would make 10 appearances and scoring two goals in his first season.

In the 2013–14 season, Goossens started his season well when he scored his first goal of the season, in a 4–0 win over Roda JC on 1 September 2013. Goossens continued to be a first team regular, though he had problem with indifferent form and his playing minutes significantly decreased. Towards the end of the season, Goossen sustained a hamstring injury during training that left him out for four weeks. Goossens made his return in the last game of the season, in a 1–1 draw against AZ Alkmaar, where he came on as a substitute in the second half. At the end of the season, Goossens would make twenty appearances for the club. However, the start of the 2014–15 season, it was announced that Goossens left the club by mutual consent.

=== Pune City, Voluntari and Chicago Fire ===
Goossens signed for Indian Super League club Pune City in October 2014. Goossens suffered a very serious lower rib cage and paraspinal muscle injury after a collision with his own goalkeeper Arindam Bhattacharya on 7 November 2014, which ruled him out for the remainder of the season.

In September 2015, Goossens signed for Romanian side FC Voluntari.

Following a successful trial, Goossens signed for Major League Soccer side Chicago Fire on 29 February 2016.

=== ADO Den Haag and HBC Heemstede ===
On 9 March 2018, Goossens signed a contract with ADO Den Haag until 2019. The club hesitated registering Goossens to wait for the outcome of physical tests, and as the paperwork was not completed in time, Goossens was not eligible to play for ADO for the rest of the season. He made his competitive debut on 12 August in a 2–1 home loss to FC Emmen, coming on as a substitute for Aaron Meijers in the 75th minute. He scored his first goal for the club in the return game against Emmen on 10 February 2019, which ended in a 3–2 away loss.

Goossens left ADO Den Haag on 2 January 2022 by mutual consent. He scored five goals in 73 official matches for the club. After leaving the club, he practiced with fellow Eerste Divisie club Telstar. He retired from football shortly after and instead started his own business, Fuse Sports, which provides financial guidance for professional footballers.

Since 2022, Goossens plays for SV HBC.

== International career ==
Goossens was part of the Netherlands U-17 squad that reached third place at the 2005 FIFA U-17 World Championship. He scored two goals in the tournament.

== Career statistics ==
Appearances and goals by club, season and competition
Club	Season	League			National cup		Total	
Club	Season	Division	Apps	Goals	Apps	Goals	Apps	Goals
NEC	2008–09	Eredivisie	8	1	0	0	8	1
NEC	2009–10	Eredivisie	21	3	2	2	23	5
NEC	2010–11	Eredivisie	31	7	1	0	32	7
NEC	2011–12	Eredivisie	12	3	2	1	14	4
NEC	Total		72	14	5	3	77	17
Feyenoord	2012–13	Eredivisie	10	2	1	0	11	2
Feyenoord	2013–14	Eredivisie	20	1	3	0	23	1
Feyenoord	Total		30	3	4	0	34	3
Pune City	2014	Indian Super League	4	1	0	0	4	1
FC Voluntari	2015–16	Liga I	14	1	1	0	15	1
Chicago Fire	2016	MLS	24	3	2	0	26	3
Chicago Fire	2017	MLS	1	0	0	0	1	0
Chicago Fire	Total		25	3	2	0	27	3
ADO Den Haag	2018–19	Eredivisie	21	1	2	0	23	1
ADO Den Haag	2019–20	Eredivisie	22	2	1	0	23	2
ADO Den Haag	2020–21	Eredivisie	24	2	2	0	26	2
ADO Den Haag	2021–22	Eerste Divisie	1	0	0	0	1	0
ADO Den Haag	Total		68	5	5	0	73	5
Career total			213	27	17	3	240	30
