= Piet Kraak =

Dutch footballer

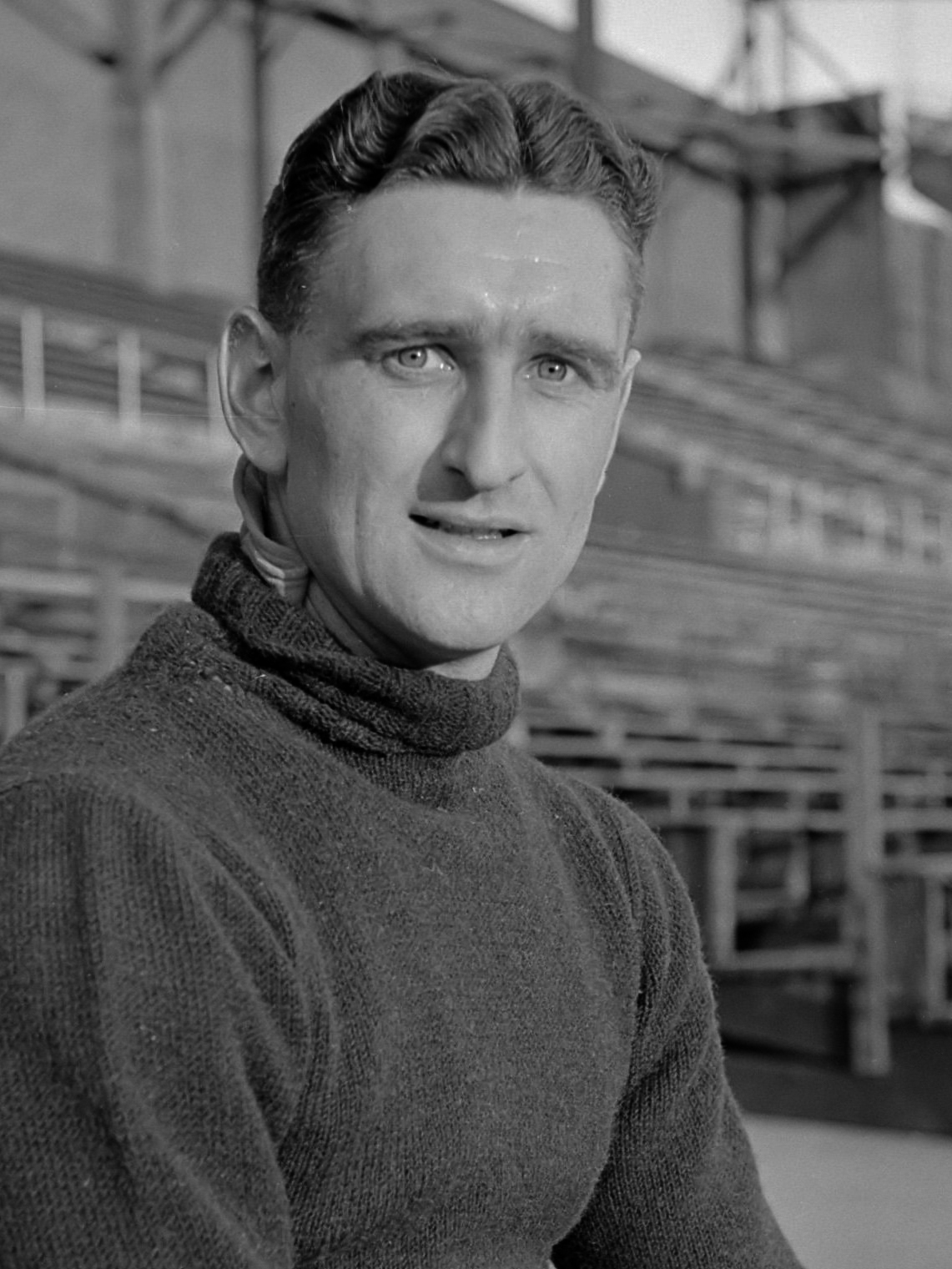
- Kraak in 1951

Personal information
- Full name: Pieter Cornelis Kraak
- Date of birth: 14 February 1921
- Place of birth: Alblasserdam, Netherlands
- Date of death: 28 April 1984 (aged 63)
- Place of death: Copenhagen, Denmark
- Position: Goalkeeper

Youth career
- 1932–1934: VSV
- 1934–1945: Stormvogels

Senior career*
| Years | Team | Apps | (Gls) |
| 1945–1953 | Stormvogels | | |
| 1953–1960 | Elinkwijk | | |

International career
| 1946–1959 | Netherlands | 33 | (0) |

Managerial career
- 1967–1968: Velox
- 1970–197?: AaB
- 1974–1977: Nakskov
- 1978–1979: Holbæk B&I
- Fårevejle
- * Club domestic league appearances and goals

Pieter Cornelis "Piet" Kraak (14 February 1921 – 28 April 1984) was a Dutch football goalkeeper and manager. Known for his ferocity in the penalty area, Kraak played most of his senior career for Stormvogels. He also gained 33 caps for the Netherlands national team, including appearances at the 1948 Summer Olympics and 1952 Summer Olympics. After his playing career he worked as a coach, notably at Velox before moving to Denmark where he coached AaB and Holbæk B&I, among others.

== Playing career ==
Born in Alblasserdam, South Holland, Kraak started playing football at VSV from Velsen in 1932. Two years later, he moved to the youth department of their rivals IJ.VV Stormvogels from IJmuiden. He remained a member of that club for twenty years. Kraak made his senior debut as a goalkeeper immediately after World War II for Stormvogels. On 10 March 1946, he made his international debut for the Netherlands national team in their first match after the war. Against Luxembourg, the final score ended in a 6–2 win. In total, Kraak made 33 international caps, two of which were at the 1948 Summer Olympics and one at the 1952 Summer Olympics. After a defeat against Belgium on 19 October 1952, which was mainly attributed to a blunder from Kraak, he was no longer called up.

During his active career, Kraak also appeared as a forward for Stormvogels. After being sidelined for several months due to a shoulder injury, he played as a forward in a game against Heracles in January 1954, in which he made a goal and an assist. In 1954, Kraak moved to USV Elinkwijk. Two years later, he decided to retire in order to establish himself as a hotel manager in Zierikzee. In October 1956, however, Kraak returned between the posts at Elinkwijk. After an absence of seven years, he received a call up for the national team again on 4 November 1959 at the age of 38 by national coach Elek Schwartz for a match against Norway, in the absence of Eddy Pieters Graafland and Frans de Munck. This proved to be his final international match. For a long time, Kraak was the oldest player to ever appear for the Netherlands national team, until 1 June 2010, where the record was broken by the then 39-year-old Sander Boschker.

== Playing style ==
Kraak was known as a ferocious goalkeeper, who was a leader on the pitch. Contemporary player Piet Heilig of Stormvogels, said: "Kraak did not give any instructions, they were commandos", while journalist Ed van Opzeeland once described: "Piet Kraak is simply a man who has megaphones where others have vocal cords."

== Later career and death ==
After his football career, Kraak was active as a manager in the Netherlands and Denmark, including at Velox and AaB. He died at the age of 63 in a hospital in Copenhagen, Denmark, after having been in a coma for more than two years after a stroke.
