= Serge van den Ban =

Dutch footballer (born 1980)

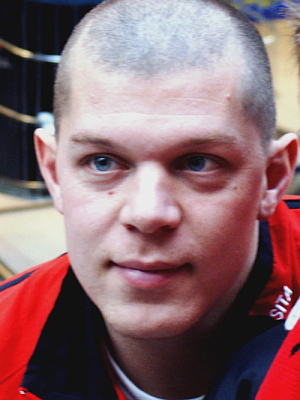

Personal information
- Full name: Serge van den Ban
- Date of birth: 2 February 1980 (age 46)
- Place of birth: Haarlem, Netherlands
- Height: 1.78 m (5 ft 10 in)
- Position: Goalkeeper

Youth career
- DCO
- Ajax

Senior career*
Years	Team	Apps	(Gls)
2000–2002	Haarlem	49	(0)
2002–2004	Dordrecht	66	(0)
2004–2008	MVV	134	(0)
2008	Telstar	4	(0)
2009–2010	ADO '20		
2010–2013	Ter Leede	24	(0)

International career
1995-1996	Netherlands U-17	6	(0)
1996-1998	Netherlands U-18	7	(0)
1996-1999	Netherlands U-19	13	(0)
2000-2001	Netherlands U-21	3	(0)

Managerial career
- FC Lisse (youth gk coach)
- 2010–2013: Ajax (youth gk coach)
- 2013–2014: Utrecht (youth gk coach)
- 2014–2015: Koninklijke HFC (reserves manager)
- 2014–2015: AZ Alkmaar (youth gk coach)
- 2014–2015: Netherlands (U-15 gk coach)
- 2015–2018: Arsenal (youth gk coach)
- 2018–2020: RKC Waalwijk (gk coach)
- 2019–202?: RKSV HBC (gk coach)
- 2020–2023: Almere City (gk coach)
- * Club domestic league appearances and goals

Serge van den Ban (born 2 February 1980), is a Dutch retired football goalkeeper.

== Club career ==
Born in Haarlem, Van den Ban came through the youth ranks at AFC Ajax. He then in 2000 started playing professionally for Haarlem in the Eerste Divisie for two seasons. Subsequently, he went to the Eredivisie with FC Dordrecht who moved to the Eerste Divisie the following season. Van Den Ban in 2004 rejoined the Eredivisie with the outfit MVV Maastricht with whom he got to the quarter finals of the 2006 KNVB Cup

He then moved to Telstar where he featuring once again in the Eerste Divisie within the 2007–08 season. Van Den Ban then linked up a year later with Hoofdklasse team ADO '20. He then signed with outfit Ter Leede in the 2010-11 season of the Hoofdklasse. He brought an end to his player career shortly afterward. Van Den Ban made in all over 250 appearances throughout his footballing club career.

== International career ==
Van den Ban played at youth level for the Netherlands He was also crowned the best goalkeeper of the 1999 Eurovoetbal tournament.

== Coaching career ==
During his last years as an active footballer, Van den Ban worked as a youth goalkeeper coach FC Lisse and also at the Keeperschool Groot Amsterdam. In July 2010, Van den Ban was appointed to a similar position at his former youth club, AFC Ajax, while also continuing his playing career, albeit at a lower level, for Ter Leede. In 2013, Van den Ben replaced Ajax with FC Utrecht, in the same position.

From the summer 2014 to the summer 2015, Van den Ben was working at three different places at the same time: firstly, he was coaching the reserve team of Koninklijke HFC. Secondly, he was working as a youth goalkeeper coach at AZ Alkmaar. And lastly, he was also working as a goaalkeeper coach for Netherlands national under-15 team.

In the summer 2015, Van den Ben was hired as youth goalkeeper coach at Premier League club Arsenal. After three years, he left the club. In June 2018, he was appointed goalkeeper coach of RKC Waalwijk. He left the position in June 2020. Beside that, he also signed as a goalkeeper coach for RKSV HBC.

On 1 July 2020, Van den Ben was appointed goalkeeper coach of Almere City FC. He left the position three years later.

== Honours ==
=== Club honours ===
Ajax

- Eurovoetbal Cup: Winner- 1999

=== Individual honours ===
- Best Goalkeeper:Eurovoetbal Cup – 1999
