= Frans de Munck =

Dutch footballer (1922–2010)

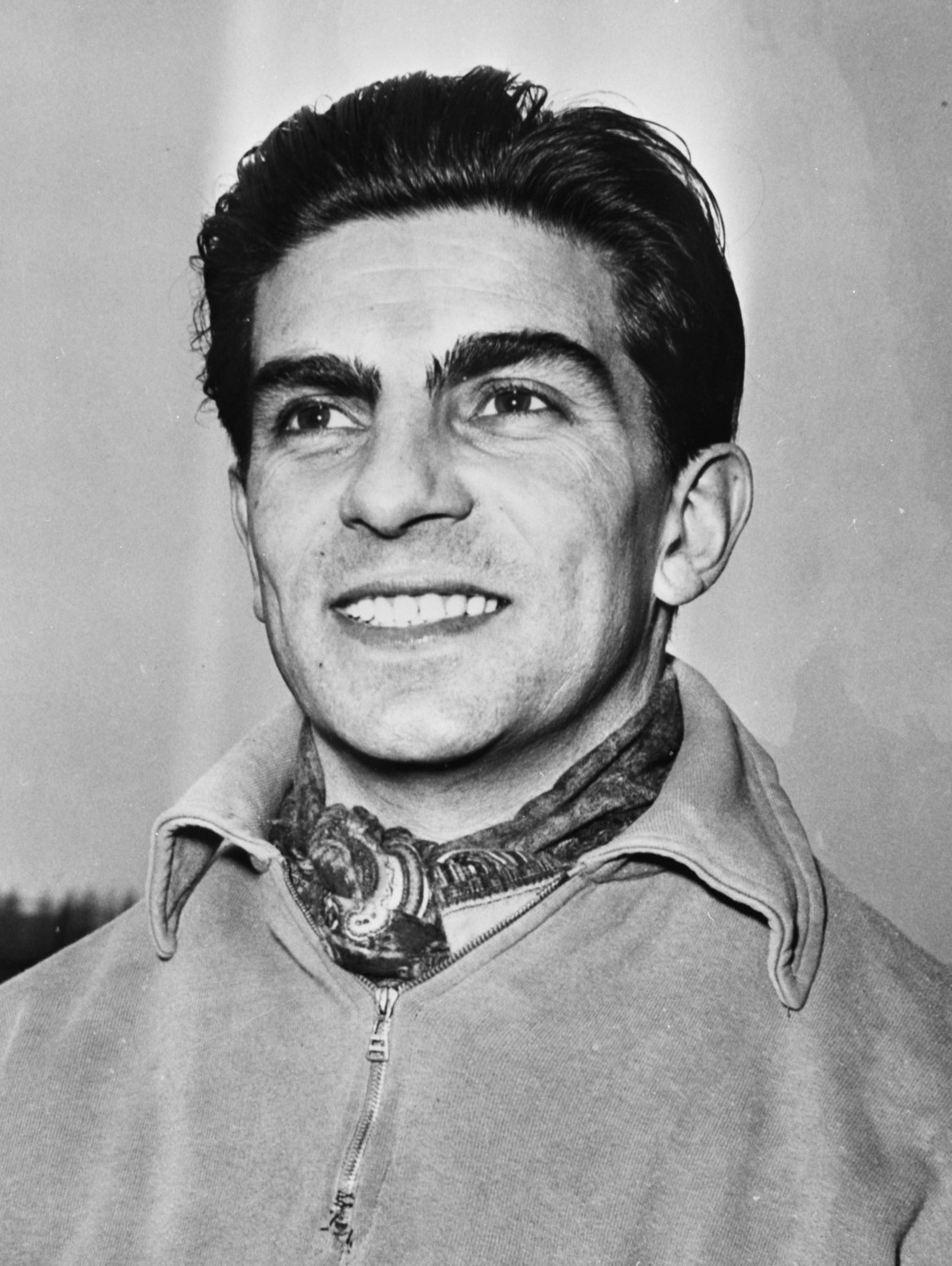
- De Munck in 1957

Personal information
- Date of birth: 20 August 1922
- Place of birth: Goes, Netherlands
- Date of death: 24 December 2010 (aged 88)
- Place of death: Arnhem, Netherlands
- Position: Goalkeeper

Youth career
- 1930–1937: VV Goes

Senior career*
Years	Team	Apps	(Gls)
1937–1944	VV Goes		
1944–1950	Sittardse Boys		
1950–1954	1. FC Köln	100	(2)
1954–1957	Fortuna '54	34	(0)
1957–1961	DOS	82	(0)
1961–1964	Veendam	102	(0)
1964–1965	Cambuur	31	(0)
1965–1966	Vitesse	30	(0)

International career
1949–1960	Netherlands	31	(0)

Managerial career
- 1966–1969: Vitesse
- 1969–1971: Club Brugge
- 1971: Lierse
- 1972–1974: Vitesse
- * Club domestic league appearances and goals

Frans de Munck (20 August 1922 – 24 December 2010) was a Dutch football player and manager.

Nicknamed The Black Panther due to his black hair, jersey and cat-like reflexes, De Munck helped VV DOS from Utrecht win the Eredivisie title in 1958, and Fortuna '54 win the KNVB Cup in 1957. For four years, he played for German top division club 1. FC Köln.

Between 1949 and 1960, he gained 31 caps for the Netherlands national team.

== Early life ==
Frans de Munck was the son of Frans de Munck Sr., a son of a Belgian inland skipper. De Munck Sr. worked as a stoker at a gas company in Goes, Zeeland, where he met Johanna Maria Labeur, a widow from Kattendijke. She had two children from her first marriage, and the couple settled on the Westerstraat in Goes. De Munck Jr. later had a half-brother from his father's marriage to Labeur, Pieter de Munck, who was seven years younger. His biological mother is unknown.

As a youngster, De Munck did a lot of sports. In addition to association football, he also did cycling, athletics, korfball and handball. He particularly excelled in athletics, including winning the Zeeland championship in javelin throw and handball.

== Playing career ==
=== Goes ===
At the age of eight, De Munck often watched practice sessions of local club VV Goes, where he was often invited to be a goalkeeper, for the first-team players to do shooting practice. Due to a knee injury, he was unable to realise his dream of becoming a forward. It turned out to be a golden opportunity to continue as a goalkeeper. He developed into a talented goalkeeper, and made his debut in the first team as a 15-year-old in 1937, against TSC Oosterhout.

=== Sittardse Boys ===
During World War II, De Munck was given the opportunity to play for German club TuRU Düsseldorf through a German officer. Because he refused, he had to work in a German arms factory. After a promotional match against Goes, Sittardse Boys offered him an opportunity to move to a higher level as a way out of working at the factory. As a goalkeeper for Goes, he had excelled in such a way that he could get a paid contract with Sittardse Boys in 1944, as result of a deal with a sponsor at the club, who thereby prevented him from being employed as a forced laborer in Germany. In Sittard, an Ausweis was arranged for him, and after the war he began working at the local police department as an officer. He then also played for the Dutch police team.

At Sittardse Boys, De Munck played in the Eredivisie, the top division of football in the Netherlands. In 1947, he received an offer from FC Barcelona to become a professional in Catalonia, but te turned down the offer as not to jeopardise his chance of being selected for the national team – in which only amateur players were allowed – and he made his debut for the Netherlands in 1949. In 1950, Ajax made him an offer. The move, however, did not materialise after it became known that De Munck had received money while in Sittard, something the Royal Dutch Football Association (KNVB) were fiercely against, as they still adhered strictly to the amateur principle. As a result, De Munck was banned from the KNVB participation for one year. Like many of the best Dutch footballers of his time, he then moved abroad.

=== 1. FC Köln ===
De Munck was the first professional footballer to appear for 1. FC Köln. He immediately showed his talent after arriving at the club, and "on the [goal-]line and in control of the penalty area [he was] equally strong," which helped the Cologne-based team finished the season with the fewest goals conceded, securing a fourth place. In his second year at the club, he competed against Fritz Herkenrath in goal. However, the future German national goalkeeper left the club after twelve months after losing the competition for becoming the starter to De Munck. 1. FC Köln finished the following seasons with fifth (and again the fewest goals conceded) and second place, before reaching the DFB-Pokal final as well as the in 1954. Köln narrowly lost in the 1954 German football championship and also lost the DFB Cup final against VfB Stuttgart 1–0.

He finished his stint in Germany with more than 100 league appearances in which he scored two goals. He also made seven appearances in the final play-offs for the German championship, three games for the West Cup and two games for the DFB-Pokal.

=== Fortuna '54, DOS and retirement ===
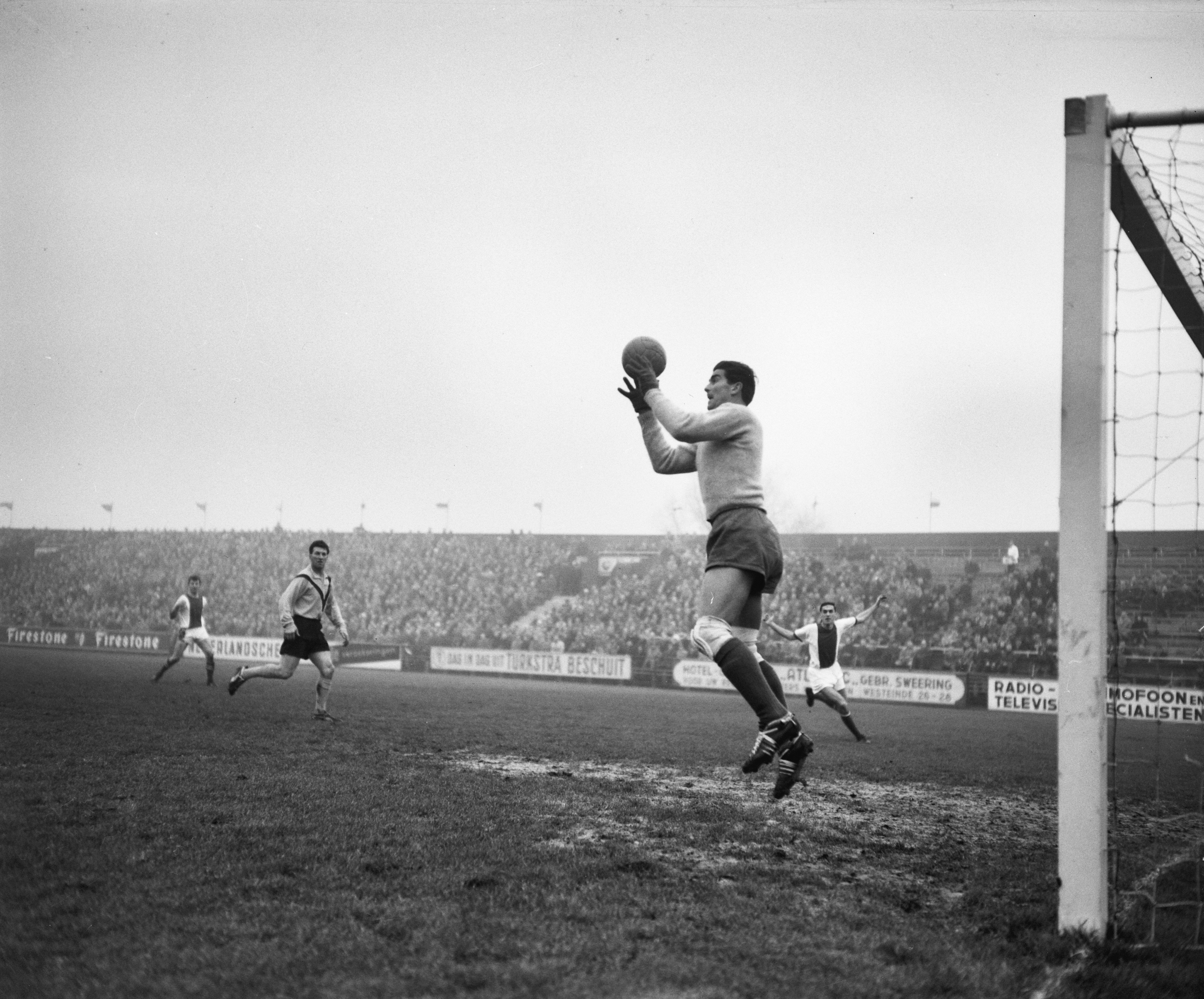
De Munck in action for VV DOS against Ajax in 1960

De Munck joined the newly founded, first Dutch professional club, Fortuna '54 from Geleen in 1954, who initially competed in the professional league of the NBVB, and since in the newly merged national league of the KNVB which became the new Eredivisie in 1956. With Fortuna, De Munck won the national cup tournament, the KNVB Cup, in 1957 after a 4–2 win in the final over Feijenoord before he moved to VV DOS, a predecessor club to the contemporary FC Utrecht. He led DOS to the championship in his first season; the club's first and only championship. In the subsequent European Cup, DOS, with De Munck in goal, were knocked out of the competition in the preliminary round after two losses (3–4; 1–2) to Portuguese club Sporting CP.

He stayed with DOS until 1961, after which he, at age 39, started playing for second-tier Eerste Divisie club Veendam. After his period in Veendam, until 1963, De Munck played for Cambuur and Vitesse. De Munck retired at the age of 44 after a friendly match between Vitesse and 1. FC Köln on 28 May 1967.

== International career ==
In 1949, De Munck represented Oranje twice; his first two international matches. In the friendly against France on 23 April 1949, he made his debut as a replacement of regular goalkeeper Piet Kraak, where he was only able to concede a goal to Jean Baratte in the third minute in the 4–1 win. In the 2–1 win in the next match in and against Denmark, De Munck was once again between the posts. Because of his subsequent suspension because of his payment as a professional at Sittardse Boys and during his time as a professional at 1. FC Köln, he was no longer allowed to compete for the national team. However, one month after the North Sea flood of 1953, which had struck large parts of the Netherlands, he took part in a selection of Dutch foreign professionals in a benefit game in front of 40,000 spectators in the Parc des Princes against France. This game went down in history as the Watersnoodwedstrijd, a prelude to professional football in the Netherlands. A year later, De Munck made his comeback for the new professional national team – again against Denmark – and remained the starting goalkeeper until 1960. Only six times did De Munck fail to concede a goal in his international matches; the biggest defeat was in 1957, a 1–5 loss to Spain in Madrid, in which Alfredo Di Stéfano scored three times against the Dutchman. He made his last international appearance for Oranje on 24 April 1960, exactly eleven years and one day after his debut, in a 1–2 defeat in Antwerp against Belgium.

== Managerial career ==
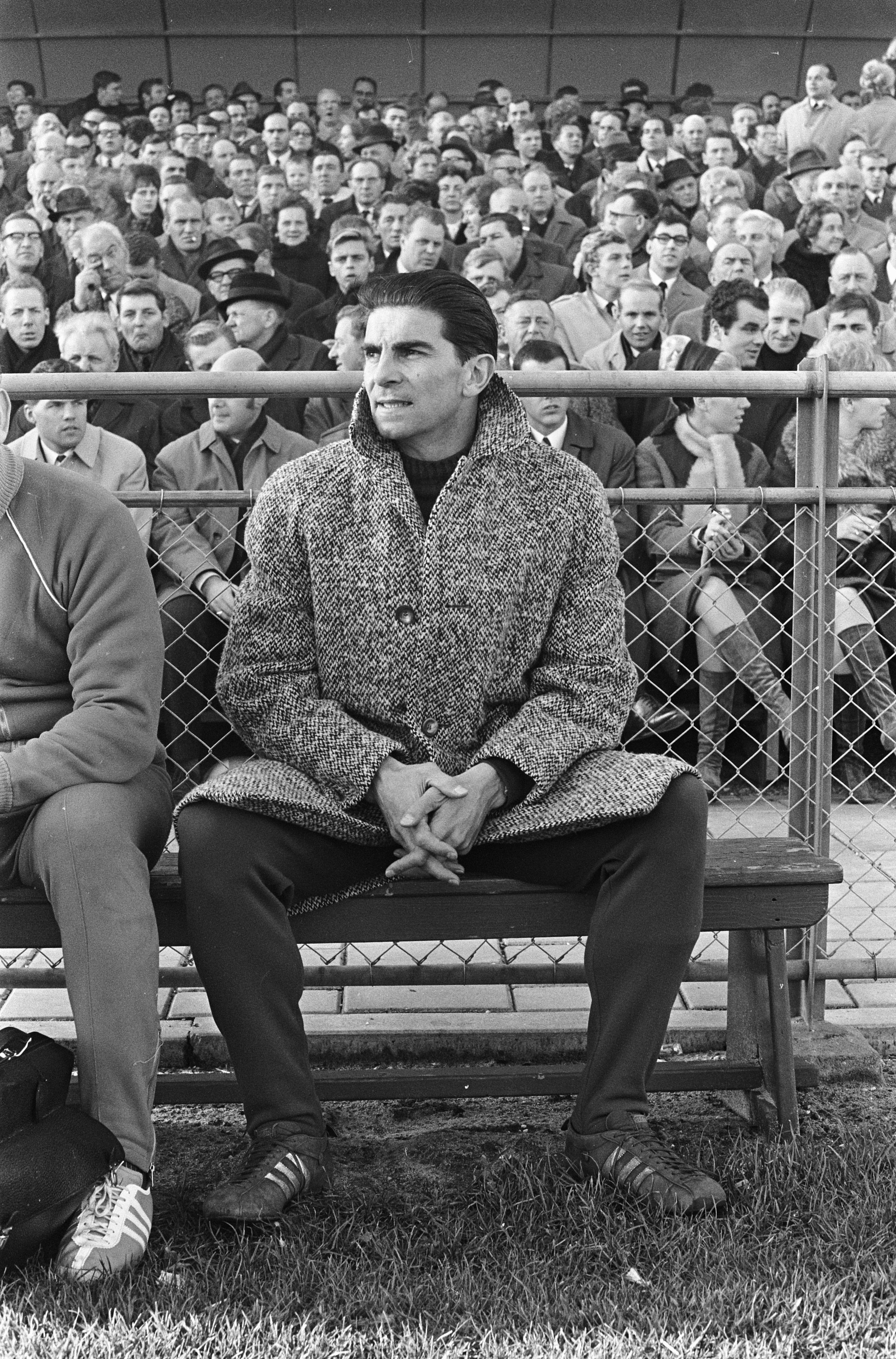
De Munck as head coach of Vitesse in 1967

De Munck's managerial career got off to a slow start. As was the case with his difficult international career, the KNVB disallowed him to pursue coaching, as they were of the opinion that De Munck did not have the correct papers. Therefore, he started a coaching course at the Sporthochschule in Cologne. The KNVB initially did not recognise the validity of his diploma, but was still willing to admit him as a manager after the intervention of Prince Bernhard, with whom he had a friendship.

De Munck started his coaching career in 1966 at Vitesse, when he himself was still active as a player. He succeeded Joseph Gruber as head coach, after the latter had been dismissed.

After his coaching stint in Arnhem, De Munck became a head coach in Belgium. First at Club Brugge, with whom he won the Belgian Cup in 1970; then at Lierse. In 1972, he returned to Vitesse as head coach. He stayed there until 1974. After his second period at Vitesse, De Munck also coached amateur clubs Minerva and Arnhemse Boys. He ended his coaching career as a youth coach at FC Dordrecht.

== Death ==
De Munck died on 24 December 2010 at the age of 88 in his hometown Arnhem. He was cremated there in the Moscowa crematorium.

== Honours ==
=== Player ===
1. FC Köln

- DFB-Pokal runner-up: 1953–54

Fortuna '54

- KNVB Cup: 1956–57

DOS

- Eredivisie: 1957–58

Cambuur

- Tweede Divisie: 1964–65

=== Manager ===
Club Brugge

- Belgian Cup: 1969–70
