= RKSV HBC =

- Full name: Rooms-Katholieke Sport Vereniging Heemstede-Berkenrode Combinatie
- Founded: 1902
- Stadium: HBC Sportpark
- Chairman: Piet Soomer
- League: Vierde Divisie
- 2024–25: Derde Divisie A, 18th of 18 (relegated)
- Website: svhbc.nl
Home colours

RKSV HBC (short for Rooms-Katholieke Sport Vereniging Heemstede-Berkenrode Combinatie), often also abbreviated as SV HBC or just HBC, is a Dutch football club from Heemstede. The club was founded in 1902 and plays its home matches at the HBC Sportpark.

== History ==
=== 20th century: Foundations and transitions ===
HBC was founded on 29 October 1902 as the Voetbalvereniging Heemstede. In 1917, it merged with Voetbalvereniging Berkenrode culminating in the Roman Catholic Heemstede-Berkenrode Combinatie. HBC joined the national league system in the Derde Klasse, possibly on the license of Berkenrode. After three years, in 1920, it moved back to the sectarian Roman Catholic DHVB leagues. From 1932 DHC played in IVCB West, into which DHVB had eveolved. In 1935, won HBC won the championship of IVCB West and ended third nationally at the IVCB.

In 1940 the sectarian leagues were eliminated and HBC started playing in the Tweede Klasse, then the second tier of the German-occupied Netherlands. In the final year of WWII there was no competition and in 1947 HBC relegated to the Derde Klasse from the 11th place. It immediately won its first championship in the national leagues, yet no promotion followed. In 1955 HBC returned to the Derde Klasse through a playoff, from a runner-up position. In 1982, HBC won its second KNVB section championship, this time securing promotion to the Tweede Klasse. In 1993, it relegated to the Derde Klasse, again from 11th place. Only three years later, in 1996, HBC ended 11th in the Derde Klasse and relegated to the Vierde. Not for long as it immediately bounced back with a section championship in 1997.

Throughout the years other HBC sports branches and eventually sport clubs were established, among which gymnastics, handball, indoors football, table tennis, tennis (founded 1953), and volleyball. The different branches are managed through a federation of clubs. The rugby club merged on 1 April 1980 with Kinheim from Haarlem to form the Rugby Football Club Haarlem in Haarlem. From 1992 until 2022, HBC also operated a Saturday first squad in the KNVB leagues. This squad usually made played it in the Vierde Klasse, where it won one championship in 2009. Within these years, Saturday first squad had brief stints also out of league or inactive (1997–1999), in the Vijfde Klasse (1999–2001), and in the Derde Klasse (2009–2010).

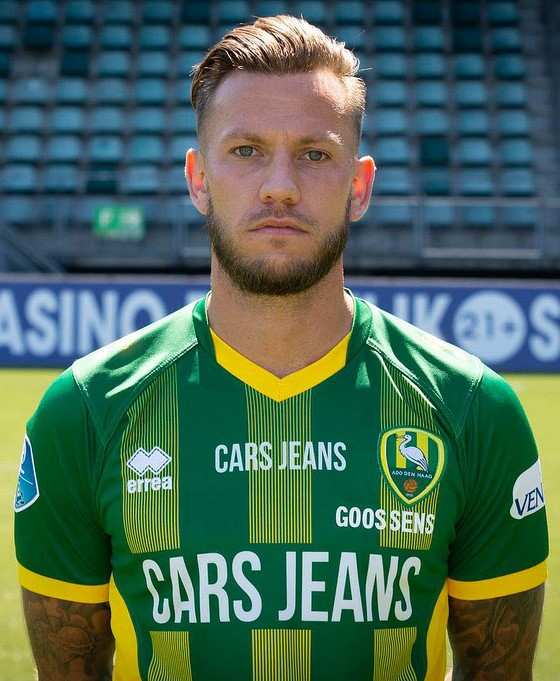
John Goossens was a professional player between HBC youth and seniors.

=== 21st century: Surge to the Derde Divisie ===
In 2011, HBC hit rock bottom when the first squad relegated (once more from place 11) to the Vierde Klasse, this time for seven years. Huge investments in youth soccer followed. Since 2015 all youth trainers of HBC are KNVB qualified. Collaborations with the youth academies of AZ Alkmaar (boys) and SC Telstar (girls) were put in place. Half the players of HBC played in youth teams. The investments on youth soccer would soon pay off big league.

HBC's chain of promotions started with a Vierde Klasse section championship in 2018. Next year it won a Derde Klasse championship and in 2022 in the Tweede Klasse. In 2023 it already won an Eerste Klasse championship. HBC won promotion to the fifth-tier Vierde Divisie in 2023, and in its first season at that level, it qualified for the promotion playoffs by winning the first period. After defeating VV Scherpenzeel in the semifinals, HBC beat JOS Watergraafsmeer 4–1 on aggregate, earning a second consecutive promotion to the Derde Divisie. The promotion was HBC's fifth consecutive.

== Associated people ==
- Serge van den Ban – goalkeeper coach (2019–202?)
- Ed Engelkes – assistant manager and youth coach (1980s)
- John Goossens – HBC youth player (1997–1999) who turned professional, then returned to HBC in 2022
