= Bradley de Nooijer =

Dutch footballer (born 1997)

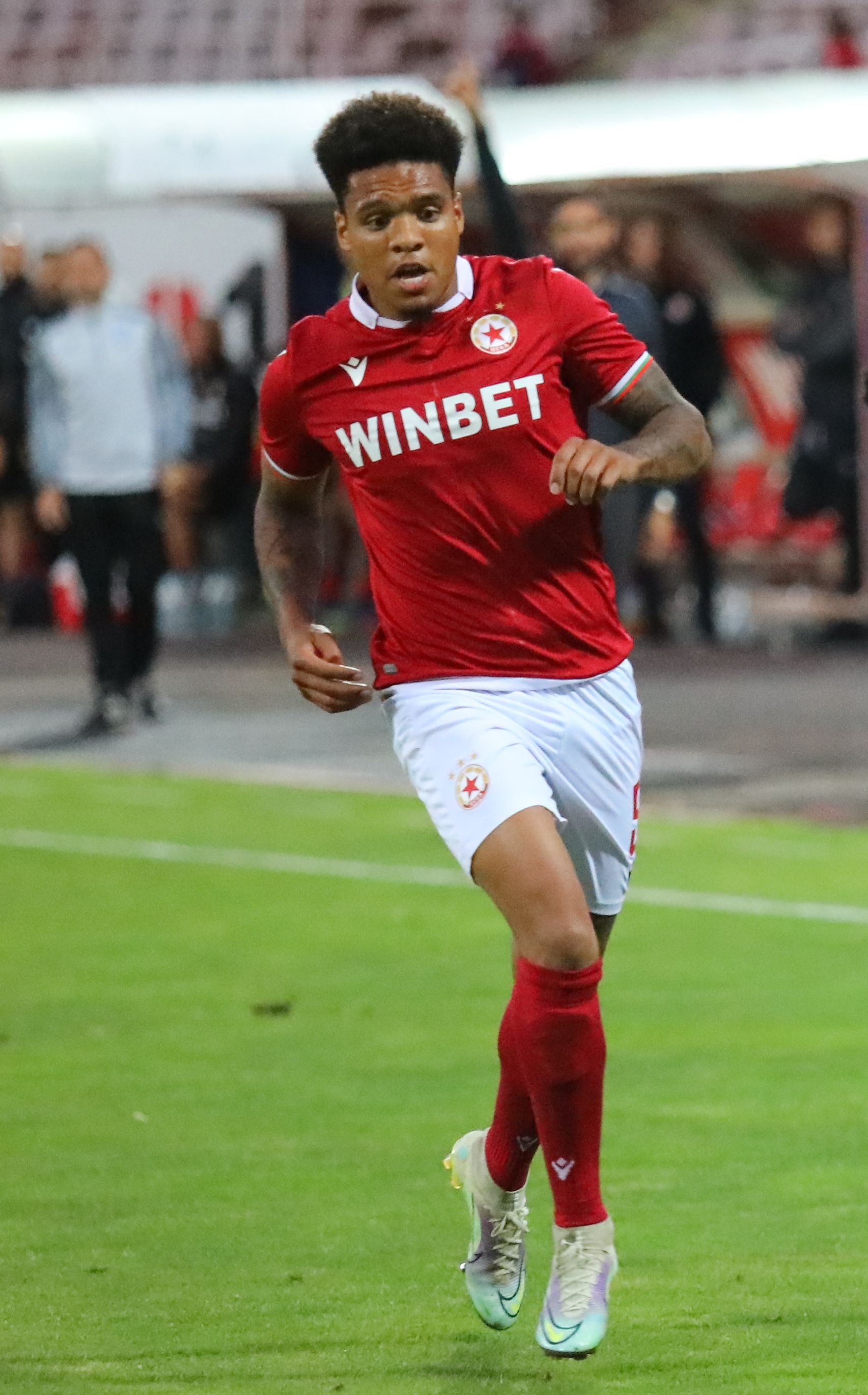
- De Nooijer with CSKA Sofia in 2022

Personal information
- Date of birth: 7 November 1997 (age 29)
- Place of birth: Oost-Souburg, Netherlands
- Height: 1.80 m (5 ft 11 in)
- Position: Left-back

Team information
- Current team: RAEC Mons
- Number: 2

Youth career
- 2010–2013: JVOZ
- 2013–2015: Sparta Rotterdam
- 2015–2016: Dordrecht

Senior career*
Years	Team	Apps	(Gls)
2016–2017	Dordrecht	36	(0)
2017–2021	Viitorul Constanța	97	(0)
2021	→ Vorskla Poltava (loan)	3	(0)
2021–2022	Farul Constanța	38	(1)
2022–2024	CSKA Sofia	25	(2)
2025	Gloria Buzău	12	(0)
2025–	RAEC Mons	14	(0)

International career
2014	Netherlands U17	1	(0)
- * Club domestic league appearances and goals as of 14:19, 7 June 2026 (UTC)

Bradley de Nooijer (born 7 November 1997) is a Dutch professional footballer who plays as a left-back for RAEC Mons.

== Club career ==
De Nooijer made his professional debut for FC Dordrecht on 5 August 2016, in a 1–1 Eerste Divisie draw with FC Oss.

== Personal life ==
De Nooijer's father and uncle, Gérard and Dennis, respectively, were professional footballers. His cousins, Jeremy and Mitchell, also play the sport.

== Career statistics ==
As of match played 18 April 2026

Appearances and goals by club, season and competition
Club	Season	League			National cup (Note: Includes KNVB Cup, Cupa României, Bulgarian Cup)		Europe		Other		Total	
Club	Season	Division	Apps	Goals	Apps	Goals	Apps	Goals	Apps	Goals	Apps	Goals
Dordrecht	2016–17	Eerste Divisie	36	0	1	0	—		—		37	0
Viitorul Constanța	2017–18	Liga I	22	0	2	0	—		—		24	0
Viitorul Constanța	2018–19	Liga I	31	0	4	0	4 (Note: Appearances in UEFA Europa League)	0	—		39	0
Viitorul Constanța	2019–20	Liga I	32	0	—		2	0	1 (Note: Appearance in Supercupa României)	0	35	0
Viitorul Constanța	2020–21	Liga I	12	0	1	0	—		—		13	0
Viitorul Constanța	Total		97	0	7	0	6	0	1	0	111	0
Vorskla (loan)	2020–21	Ukrainian Premier League	3	0	—		—		—		3	0
Farul Constanța	2021–22	Liga I	38	1	—		—		—		38	1
CSKA Sofia	2022–23	First League	21	2	2	0	4 (Note: Appearances in UEFA Europa Conference League)	0	—		27	2
CSKA Sofia	2023–24	First League	4	0	1	0	0	0	—		5	0
CSKA Sofia	Total		25	2	3	0	4	0	0	0	32	2
Gloria Buzău	2024–25	Liga I	12	0	—		—		—		12	0
RAEC Mons	2025–26	Belgian Division 1	14	0	—		—		—		14	0
Career total			225	3	11	0	10	0	1	0	247	3

== Honours ==
Viitorul Constanța

- Cupa României: 2018–19
- Supercupa României: 2019

Individual

- Best goal in Bulgarian football for 2022
