= 2024–25 Derde Divisie =

Fourth tier of Dutch football season

Derde Divisie
- Season: 2024–25

The 2024–25 Derde Divisie season is the ninth edition of the Dutch fourth tier.

== Derde Divisie A ==
Derde Divisie A
- Season: 2024–25
- Champions: IJsselmeervogels
- Promoted: IJsselmeervogels
- Relegated: Ajax; DEM; HBC

=== Teams ===
==== Team changes ====
| Promoted from 2023–24 Vierde Divisie | Transferred from 2024-25 Derde Divisie B | Promoted to 2024–25 Tweede Divisie | Relegated to 2024–25 Vierde Divisie | Transferred to 2024-25 Derde Divisie B |
|---|---|---|---|---|
| Ajax; Excelsior '31; HBC; Huizen; ROHDA | Sportlust '46; TEC | RKAV Volendam | Staphorst; Hoogeveen; Kampong; ODIN '59 | Rijnvogels; VVSB |

Location of teams in the Derde Divisie B 2024-25
Utrecht clubs in the Derde Divisie A 2024-25

| Club | Location |
|---|---|
| Ajax | Amsterdam |
| DEM | Beverwijk |
| DOVO | Veenendaal |
| DVS '33 | Ermelo |
| Eemdijk | Bunschoten |
| Excelsior '31 | Rijssen |
| Genemuiden | Genemuiden |
| Harkemase Boys | Harkema |
| HBC | Heemstede |
| Hercules | Utrecht |
| HSC '21 | Haaksbergen |
| Huizen | Huizen |
| IJsselmeervogels | Spakenburg |
| ROHDA | Raalte |
| Sparta Nijkerk | Nijkerk |
| Sportlust '46 | Woerden |
| TEC | Tiel |
| Urk | Urk |

==== Number of teams by province ====
| Number of teams | Province | Team(s) |
|---|---|---|
| 5 | Utrecht | DOVO, Eemdijk, Hercules, IJsselmeervogels, Sportlust '46 |
| 4 | North Holland | Ajax, DEM, HBC, Huizen |
| 4 | Overijssel | Excelsior '31, Genemuiden, HSC '21, ROHDA |
| 3 | Gelderland | DVS '33, Sparta Nijkerk, TEC |
| 1 | Flevoland | Urk |
| 1 | Friesland | Harkemase Boys |

=== Standings ===
| Pos | Team | Pld | W | D | L | GF | GA | GD | Pts | Promotion, qualification or relegation |
|---|---|---|---|---|---|---|---|---|---|---|
| 1 | IJsselmeervogels (Note: Winner of the Second and Third Period (Rounds 13–23 and 24–34)) (C, P) | 34 | 26 | 4 | 4 | 98 | 35 | +63 | 82 | Promotion to Tweede Divisie |
| 2 | Harkemase Boys | 34 | 21 | 7 | 6 | 74 | 46 | +28 | 70 | Qualification for promotion play-offs |
| 3 | Sportlust '46 | 34 | 20 | 7 | 7 | 78 | 37 | +41 | 67 | Qualification for promotion play-offs |
| 4 | DVS '33 | 34 | 19 | 8 | 7 | 78 | 52 | +26 | 65 | |
| 5 | Sparta Nijkerk | 34 | 16 | 10 | 8 | 68 | 50 | +18 | 58 | |
| 6 | Hercules | 34 | 16 | 6 | 12 | 65 | 56 | +9 | 54 | |
| 7 | DOVO (Note: Winner of the First Period (Rounds 1–12)) | 34 | 15 | 7 | 12 | 43 | 39 | +4 | 52 | Qualification for promotion play-offs |
| 8 | Genemuiden | 34 | 13 | 9 | 12 | 52 | 44 | +8 | 48 | |
| 9 | Urk | 34 | 15 | 2 | 17 | 56 | 67 | −11 | 47 | |
| 10 | Eemdijk | 34 | 11 | 10 | 13 | 64 | 66 | −2 | 43 | |
| 11 | TEC | 34 | 11 | 9 | 14 | 46 | 56 | −10 | 42 | |
| 12 | ROHDA | 34 | 11 | 7 | 16 | 63 | 68 | −5 | 40 | |
| 13 | HSC '21 | 34 | 12 | 4 | 18 | 50 | 66 | −16 | 40 | |
| 14 | Huizen | 34 | 10 | 6 | 18 | 44 | 62 | −18 | 36 | |
| 15 | Excelsior '31 (O) | 34 | 9 | 9 | 16 | 46 | 71 | −25 | 36 | Qualification for relegation play-offs |
| 16 | Ajax (R) | 34 | 9 | 8 | 17 | 48 | 64 | −16 | 35 | Qualification for relegation play-offs |
| 17 | DEM (R) | 34 | 8 | 6 | 20 | 43 | 85 | −42 | 30 | Relegation to Vierde Divisie |
| 18 | HBC (R) | 34 | 1 | 7 | 26 | 40 | 92 | −52 | 10 | Relegation to Vierde Divisie |

Source: Flashsore
Rules for classification: Season in progress: 1) Most points won; 2) Less points lost; 3) Goal difference; 4) Goals scored; 5) Alphabetical order; End of season: 1) Points; 2) Goal difference; 3) Goals scored; 4) Head-to-head points; 5) Head-to-head goal difference; 6) Head-to-head away goals scored; 7) Play-off if relevant for deciding champion, relegation or participating in a European league, otherwise by draw. 8) Penalty shoot-out (only after a play-off)
(C) Champions; (O) Play-off winners; (P) Promoted; (R) Relegated

=== Fixtures and results ===
| Home \ Away | AJA | DEM | DOV | DVS | EEM | EXC | GEN | HAR | HBC | HER | HSC | HUI | IJS | ROH | SPA | SPO | TEC | URK |
|---|---|---|---|---|---|---|---|---|---|---|---|---|---|---|---|---|---|---|
| Ajax | | 2–0 | 2–0 | 1–3 | 1–3 | 3–3 | 1–2 | 1–0 | 1–0 | 0–2 | 2–1 | 1–2 | 1–2 | 3–4 | 3–4 | 1–4 | 2–3 | 0–2 |
| DEM | 2–2 | | 0–2 | 0–0 | 2–3 | 1–1 | 0–2 | 1–5 | 4–3 | 4–3 | 2–1 | 0–2 | 0–2 | 0–1 | 4–3 | 1–4 | 2–1 | 0–3 |
| DOVO | 1–1 | 0–1 | | 5–1 | 1–1 | 1–0 | 1–0 | 1–2 | 4–2 | 2–1 | 2–0 | 0–2 | 1–6 | 2–0 | 1–1 | 0–0 | 1–1 | 0–2 |
| DVS '33 | 4–2 | 6–1 | 2–0 | | 1–0 | 4–0 | 2–0 | 1–1 | 3–1 | 4–3 | 4–0 | 3–1 | 4–1 | 5–5 | 2–1 | 1–4 | 3–0 | 0–2 |
| Eemdijk | 4–1 | 2–2 | 1–2 | 1–5 | | 4–0 | 0–1 | 1–1 | 2–2 | 3–2 | 2–3 | 2–3 | 2–4 | 4–2 | 3–3 | 4–4 | 3–0 | 4–1 |
| Excelsior '31 | 2–1 | 4–2 | 0–1 | 1–2 | 2–0 | | 0–4 | 1–5 | 4–2 | 1–1 | 0–1 | 2–2 | 0–3 | 0–4 | 2–4 | 1–3 | 3–1 | 2–2 |
| Genemuiden | 1–0 | 3–3 | 0–1 | 0–0 | 5–0 | 0–0 | | 1–1 | 1–1 | 1–0 | 1–4 | 4–0 | 1–3 | 3–1 | 3–1 | 0–3 | 0–0 | 2–2 |
| Harkemase Boys | 0–2 | 3–1 | 2–0 | 0–1 | 1–0 | 1–0 | 1–1 | | 6–1 | 3–1 | 2–2 | 3–1 | 0–2 | 1–0 | 3–1 | 1–0 | 3–1 | 4–2 |
| HBC | 2–2 | 2–2 | 0–2 | 0–3 | 4–4 | 2–3 | 1–3 | 1–3 | | 0–2 | 1–2 | 0–2 | 3–3 | 3–2 | 1–3 | 0–3 | 4–5 | 1–2 |
| Hercules | 0–1 | 5–2 | 1–0 | 4–4 | 2–1 | 1–1 | 2–1 | 2–4 | 2–0 | | 2–3 | 1–0 | 1–3 | 3–2 | 0–5 | 4–0 | 3–1 | 2–1 |
| HSC '21 | 1–4 | 3–1 | 2–1 | 3–3 | 0–3 | 2–0 | 0–4 | 1–2 | 2–0 | 2–3 | | 4–1 | 2–2 | 2–4 | 1–2 | 0–2 | 0–1 | 1–3 |
| Huizen | 0–0 | 0–1 | 1–2 | 3–0 | 0–1 | 1–1 | 1–0 | 2–4 | 2–1 | 1–2 | 1–2 | | 1–1 | 2–1 | 0–1 | 0–6 | 1–1 | 2–3 |
| IJsselmeervogels | 4–3 | 6–0 | 3–0 | 3–1 | 0–0 | 6–1 | 3–1 | 7–0 | 4–0 | 3–1 | 3–0 | 2–1 | | 4–0 | 3–2 | 3–1 | 2–1 | 5–1 |
| ROHDA | 1–1 | 2–0 | 0–0 | 0–2 | 0–3 | 2–2 | 2–1 | 3–4 | 2–2 | 2–2 | 2–0 | 3–2 | 1–2 | | 0–1 | 4–4 | 2–0 | 4–6 |
| Sparta Nijkerk | 1–1 | 3–2 | 1–1 | 1–1 | 2–2 | 0–2 | 4–1 | 2–1 | 2–0 | 1–1 | 2–3 | 2–2 | 2–1 | 1–0 | | 0–4 | 1–1 | 4–0 |
| Sportlust '46 | 5–0 | 3–0 | 3–1 | 2–2 | 0–0 | 1–3 | 2–0 | 2–2 | 5–0 | 0–2 | 1–0 | 3–2 | 1–0 | 2–0 | 1–1 | | 3–1 | 1–2 |
| TEC | 1–1 | 2–0 | 0–5 | 4–1 | 6–1 | 3–1 | 3–3 | 1–1 | 1–0 | 0–0 | 1–1 | 0–2 | 1–0 | 1–2 | 0–2 | 1–0 | | 0–2 |
| Urk | 0–1 | 1–2 | 0–2 | 2–0 | 3–0 | 1–3 | 1–2 | 2–4 | 1–0 | 0–4 | 2–1 | 5–1 | 1–2 | 0–5 | 0–4 | 0–1 | 1–3 | |

Source: Flashsore
Legend: Blue = home team win; Yellow = draw; Red = away team win.

== Derde Divisie B ==
Derde Divisie B
- Season: 2024–25
- Champions: Hoek
- Promoted: Hoek; Kozakken Boys
- Relegated: OJC 's-Gravenzande; Smitshoek; Quick

=== Teams ===
==== Team changes ====
| Promoted from 2023–24 Vierde Divisie | Relegated from 2023–24 Tweede Divisie | Transferred from 2024-25 Derde Divisie A | Promoted to 2024–25 Tweede Divisie | Relegated to 2024–25 Vierde Divisie | Transferred to 2024-25 Derde Divisie A | Withdrawn |
|---|---|---|---|---|---|---|
| ASWH 's-Gravenzande; GOES; Smitshoek | Kozakken Boys; Lisse | Rijnvogels; VVSB | Barendrecht | Baronie; Groene Ster; Unitas; AWC | Sportlust '46; TEC | OSS '20 |

Location of teams in the Derde Divisie B 2024-25

| Club | Location |
|---|---|
| ASWH | Hendrik-Ido-Ambacht |
| Blauw Geel '38 | Veghel |
| Gemert | Gemert |
| GOES | Goes |
| 's-Gravenzande | 's-Gravenzande |
| Hoek | Hoek |
| Kloetinge | Kloetinge |
| Kozakken Boys | Werkendam |
| Lisse | Lisse |
| Meerssen | Meerssen |
| OJC | Rosmalen |
| Quick | The Hague |
| Rijnvogels | Katwijk |
| Smitshoek | Barendrecht |
| SteDoCo | Hoornaar |
| TOGB | Berkel en Rodenrijs |
| UNA | Veldhoven |
| VVSB | Noordwijkerhout |

==== Number of teams by province ====
| Number of teams | Province | Team(s) |
|---|---|---|
| 9 | South Holland | ASWH, 's-Gravenzande, Lisse, Quick, Rijnvogels, Smitshoek, SteDoCo, TOGB, VVSB |
| 5 | North Brabant | Blauw Geel '38, Gemert, Kozakken Boys, OJC, UNA |
| 3 | Zeeland | GOES, Hoek, Kloetinge |
| 1 | Limburg | Meerssen |

=== Standings ===
| Pos | Team | Pld | W | D | L | GF | GA | GD | Pts | Promotion, qualification or relegation |
|---|---|---|---|---|---|---|---|---|---|---|
| 1 | Hoek (C, P) | 34 | 20 | 10 | 4 | 77 | 33 | +44 | 70 | Promotion to Tweede Divisie |
| 2 | Kozakken Boys (Note: Winner of the Third Period (Rounds 24–34)) (P) | 34 | 19 | 7 | 8 | 72 | 29 | +43 | 64 | Qualification for promotion play-offs |
| 3 | Blauw Geel '38 (Note: Winner of the First Period (Rounds 1–12)) | 34 | 19 | 7 | 8 | 73 | 45 | +28 | 64 | Qualification for promotion play-offs |
| 4 | Kloetinge | 34 | 18 | 7 | 9 | 66 | 42 | +24 | 61 | |
| 5 | Gemert | 34 | 17 | 7 | 10 | 57 | 50 | +7 | 58 | |
| 6 | Lisse | 34 | 15 | 9 | 10 | 55 | 41 | +14 | 54 | |
| 7 | UNA | 34 | 15 | 8 | 11 | 51 | 48 | +3 | 53 | |
| 8 | VVSB | 34 | 15 | 6 | 13 | 61 | 61 | 0 | 51 | |
| 9 | SteDoCo | 34 | 13 | 9 | 12 | 57 | 46 | +11 | 48 | |
| 10 | Meerssen (Note: Winner of the Second Period (Rounds 13–23)) | 34 | 13 | 6 | 15 | 44 | 50 | −6 | 45 | Qualification for promotion play-offs |
| 11 | Rijnvogels | 34 | 13 | 6 | 15 | 63 | 72 | −9 | 45 | |
| 12 | ASWH | 34 | 12 | 6 | 16 | 59 | 73 | −14 | 42 | |
| 13 | TOGB | 34 | 11 | 8 | 15 | 55 | 53 | +2 | 41 | |
| 14 | GOES | 34 | 9 | 12 | 13 | 53 | 65 | −12 | 39 | |
| 15 | OJC (R) | 34 | 11 | 6 | 17 | 45 | 58 | −13 | 39 | Qualification for relegation play-offs |
| 16 | 's-Gravenzande (R) | 34 | 9 | 7 | 18 | 51 | 69 | −18 | 34 | Qualification for relegation play-offs |
| 17 | Smitshoek (R) | 34 | 6 | 7 | 21 | 53 | 94 | −41 | 25 | Relegation to Vierde Divisie |
| 18 | Quick (R) | 34 | 5 | 4 | 25 | 42 | 105 | −63 | 19 | Relegation to Vierde Divisie |

Source: Flashsore
Rules for classification: Season in progress: 1) Most points won; 2) Less points lost; 3) Goal difference; 4) Goals scored; 5) Alphabetical order; End of season: 1) Points; 2) Goal difference; 3) Goals scored; 4) Head-to-head points; 5) Head-to-head goal difference; 6) Head-to-head away goals scored; 7) Play-off if relevant for deciding champion, relegation or participating in a European league, otherwise by draw. 8) Penalty shoot-out (only after a play-off)
(C) Champions; (P) Promoted; (R) Relegated

=== Fixtures and results ===
| Home \ Away | ASW | BLA | GEM | GOE | GRA | HOE | KLO | KOZ | LIS | MEE | OJC | QUI | RIJ | SMI | STE | TOG | UNA | VVS |
|---|---|---|---|---|---|---|---|---|---|---|---|---|---|---|---|---|---|---|
| ASWH | | 0–2 | 0–2 | 1–5 | 2–0 | 4–3 | 0–1 | 1–1 | 1–1 | 1–3 | 2–1 | 4–2 | 3–3 | 3–5 | 4–2 | 4–2 | 1–4 | 4–2 |
| Blauw Geel '38 | 0–1 | | 1–2 | 3–0 | 4–1 | 2–1 | 1–1 | 0–0 | 2–1 | 3–0 | 0–0 | 4–1 | 3–1 | 5–4 | 0–2 | 3–3 | 6–0 | 4–0 |
| Gemert | 0–3 | 2–0 | | 1–1 | 3–2 | 3–3 | 0–0 | 1–0 | 2–0 | 1–1 | 3–1 | 5–1 | 3–1 | 3–1 | 1–0 | 0–1 | 1–2 | 0–1 |
| GOES | 1–4 | 0–3 | 4–1 | | 2–2 | 1–1 | 0–1 | 2–5 | 2–3 | 1–1 | 0–0 | 3–1 | 3–1 | 1–3 | 2–2 | 2–1 | 1–1 | 2–2 |
| 's-Gravenzande | 2–1 | 2–3 | 4–0 | 2–3 | | 1–2 | 2–2 | 0–3 | 0–0 | 4–0 | 1–1 | 2–1 | 1–1 | 3–2 | 1–3 | 2–0 | 1–1 | 1–3 |
| Hoek | 3–1 | 0–0 | 3–1 | 2–0 | 4–0 | | 1–0 | 3–0 | 5–2 | 3–0 | 1–3 | 6–1 | 4–0 | 4–0 | 1–1 | 3–1 | 0–1 | 5–1 |
| Kloetinge | 1–0 | 0–1 | 1–2 | 4–4 | 2–1 | 2–4 | | 2–1 | 1–0 | 0–1 | 2–0 | 4–1 | 2–3 | 4–1 | 1–0 | 2–0 | 2–0 | 4–0 |
| Kozakken Boys | 4–0 | 2–0 | 3–0 | 3–0 | 7–1 | 1–1 | 1–1 | | 2–1 | 0–0 | 5–1 | 4–0 | 4–1 | 7–1 | 3–1 | 0–2 | 0–1 | 1–0 |
| Lisse | 1–1 | 2–3 | 2–2 | 3–0 | 2–1 | 0–0 | 3–1 | 1–0 | | 0–2 | 4–1 | 3–0 | 0–2 | 2–1 | 4–0 | 1–1 | 0–1 | 3–0 |
| Meerssen | 2–0 | 3–1 | 2–5 | 3–2 | 0–1 | 1–1 | 0–0 | 2–0 | 1–3 | | 0–2 | 3–0 | 0–1 | 4–1 | 3–2 | 0–3 | 2–4 | 1–3 |
| OJC | 1–2 | 1–4 | 4–2 | 0–2 | 2–0 | 0–0 | 3–4 | 1–2 | 0–1 | 1–4 | | 4–1 | 0–0 | 3–2 | 0–3 | 2–1 | 2–0 | 1–1 |
| Quick | 2–1 | 1–3 | 0–1 | 1–3 | 4–3 | 2–2 | 4–2 | 0–4 | 1–2 | 0–2 | 2–1 | | 1–2 | 2–2 | 4–3 | 3–3 | 1–6 | 2–3 |
| Rijnvogels | 6–2 | 3–2 | 2–2 | 1–2 | 1–4 | 0–2 | 3–6 | 0–2 | 3–1 | 1–1 | 1–0 | 4–0 | | 6–1 | 2–4 | 1–2 | 5–2 | 2–0 |
| Smitshoek | 1–5 | 1–1 | 1–2 | 0–0 | 2–3 | 1–2 | 1–5 | 2–1 | 2–2 | 0–2 | 1–2 | 4–0 | 2–2 | | 0–2 | 1–2 | 2–2 | 2–9 |
| SteDoCo | 1–1 | 1–2 | 0–1 | 3–0 | 1–1 | 2–2 | 1–0 | 1–1 | 1–1 | 1–0 | 0–1 | 5–0 | 5–3 | 1–0 | | 2–1 | 4–1 | 0–1 |
| TOGB | 4–0 | 2–2 | 0–1 | 2–2 | 2–1 | 0–1 | 1–4 | 1–3 | 1–1 | 2–0 | 3–2 | 3–0 | 5–0 | 1–2 | 1–1 | | 1–2 | 1–1 |
| UNA | 1–1 | 4–0 | 3–2 | 0–0 | 3–0 | 0–1 | 1–1 | 0–1 | 1–4 | 1–0 | 2–1 | 2–2 | 0–1 | 1–2 | 1–1 | 2–1 | | 0–1 |
| VVSB | 4–1 | 3–5 | 2–2 | 4–2 | 2–1 | 1–3 | 1–3 | 1–1 | 0–1 | 2–0 | 2–3 | 2–1 | 3–0 | 2–2 | 2–1 | 2–1 | 0–1 | |

Source: Flashsore
Legend: Blue = home team win; Yellow = draw; Red = away team win.

== Play-offs ==
=== Tweede divisie promotion/relegation play-offs ===
8 teams (16th and 17th place in the Tweede Divisie and three teams each from the Derde Divisie A and Derde Divisie B) play for one spot in next season's Tweede Divisie.

==== Bracket ====
Quarterfinals
Kozakken Boys (p) | 0 | 2 | 2 (8)
DOVO | 2 | 0 | 2 (7)
Scheveningen | 2 | 1 | 3
Sportlust '46 | 0 | 0 | 0
Harkemase Boys | 3 | 2 | 5
Meerssen | 0 | 0 | 0
Noordwijk | 1 | 4 | 5
Blauw Geel '38 | 2 | 1 | 3

Semifinals
Kozakken Boys | 0 | 1 | 1
Scheveningen | 0 | 0 | 0
Harkemase Boys | 2 | 1 | 3
Noordwijk | 2 | 3 | 5

Final
Kozakken Boys | 0 | 4 | 4
Noordwijk | 1 | 0 | 1

===== Quarterfinals =====
28 May 2025
20:00

| Sportlust '46 | 0–2 | Scheveningen |

Sportpark Cromwijck, Woerden
31 May 2025
14:30

| Scheveningen | 1–0 | Sportlust '46 |

Houtrust Scheveningen, The Hague

Scheveningen won 3–0 on aggregate.

28 May 2025
20:00

| DOVO | 2–0 | Kozakken Boys |

Sportpark Panhuis, Veenendaal
31 May 2025
15:00

| Kozakken Boys | 2–0 (a.e.t.) | DOVO |
Penalties
| | 8–7 |

De Zwaaier, Werkendam

2–2 on aggregate. Kozakken Boys won 8–7 on penalties

28 May 2025
20:00

| Blauw Geel '38 | 2–1 | Noordwijk |

Prins Willem Alexander Sportpark, Veghel
31 May 2025
14:30

| Noordwijk | 4–1 | Blauw Geel '38 |

Sportpark Duinwetering, Noordwijk

Noordwijk won 5–3 on aggregate.

28 May 2025
20:00

| Meerssen | 0–3 | Harkemase Boys |

Sportpark Marsana, Meerssen
31 May 2025
14:30

| Harkemase Boys | 2–0 | Meerssen |

De Bosk, Harkema

Harkemase Boys won 5–0 on aggregate.

===== Semifinals =====
4 June 2025
20:00

| Scheveningen | 0–0 | Kozakken Boys |

Houtrust Scheveningen, The Hague
7 June 2025
15:00

| Kozakken Boys | 1–0 | Scheveningen |

De Zwaaier, Werkendam

Kozakken Boys won 1–0 on aggregate.

4 June 2025
19:30

| Noordwijk | 2–2 | Harkemase Boys |

Sportpark Duinwetering, Noordwijk
7 June 2025
14:30

| Harkemase Boys | 1–3 | Noordwijk |

De Bosk, Harkema

Noordwijk won 5–3 on aggregate.

===== Final =====
11 June 2025
19:30

| Noordwijk | 1–0 | Kozakken Boys |

Sportpark Duinwetering, Noordwijk
14 June 2025
16:00

| Kozakken Boys | 4–0 | Noordwijk |

De Zwaaier, Werkendam

Kozakken Boys won 4–1 on aggregate.

=== Derde Divisie promotion/relegation playoffs ===
The teams who finish 15th and 16th in both the Derde Divisie A and B will play relegation playoffs against teams from the Vierde Divisie. The four bracket winners will play in next season's Derde Divisie.

==== Derde Divisie A ====
===== Bracket 1 =====
Semifinals
Staphorst | 0 | 6 | 6
SJC | 0 | 2 | 2
Ajax | 2 | 0 | 2
Kampong | 4 | 1 | 5

Final
Staphorst | 2 | 2 | 4
Kampong | 0 | 2 | 2

====== Semifinals ======
31 May 2025
14:30

| Kampong | 4–2 | Ajax |

4 June 2025
20:00

| Ajax | 0–1 | Kampong |

Kampong won 5–2 on aggregate.

28 May 2025
20:00

| SJC | 0–0 | Staphorst |

31 May 2025
14:30

| Staphorst | 6–2 | SJC |

Staphorst won 6–2 on aggregate.

====== Final ======
7 June 2025
14:30

| Kampong | 0–2 | Staphorst |

11 June 2025
20:00

| Staphorst | 2–2 | Kampong |

Staphorst won 4–2 on aggregate.

===== Bracket 2 =====
Semifinals
JOS Watergraafsmeer | 0 | 1 | 1
Heino | 0 | 0 | 0
Excelsior '31 | 3 | 5 | 8
Flevo Boys | 0 | 1 | 1

Final
JOS Watergraafsmeer | 0 | 2 | 2
Excelsior '31 | 1 | 2 | 3

====== Semifinals ======
28 May 2025
20:00

| Flevo Boys | 0–3 | Excelsior '31 |

31 May 2025
14:30

| Excelsior '31 | 5–1 | Flevo Boys |

Excelsior '31 won 8–1 on aggregate.

28 May 2025
20:00

| Heino | 0–0 | JOS Watergraafsmeer |

1 June 2025
14:00

| JOS Watergraafsmeer | 1–0 | Heino |

JOS Watergraafsmeer won 1–0 on aggregate.

====== Final ======
4 June 2025
20:00

| Excelsior '31 | 1–0 | JOS Watergraafsmeer |

7 June 2025
14:30

| JOS Watergraafsmeer | 2–2 | Excelsior '31 |

Excelsior '31 won 3–2 on aggregate.

==== Derde Divisie B ====
===== Bracket 1 =====
Semifinals
Groene Ster | 1 | 1 | 2
RKAVV | 1 | 0 | 1
's-Gravenzande | 3 | 2 | 5
Poortugaal | 0 | 2 | 2

Final
Groene Ster | 1 | 4 | 5
's-Gravenzande | 0 | 3 | 3

====== Semifinals ======
31 May 2025
14:30

| Poortugaal | 0–3 | 's-Gravenzande |

4 June 2025
20:00

| 's-Gravenzande | 2–2 | Poortugaal |

's-Gravenzande won 5–2 on aggregate.

4 June 2025
20:00

| RKAVV | 1–1 | Groene Ster |

8 June 2025
14:30

| Groene Ster | 1–0 | RKAVV |

Groene Ster won 2–1 on aggregate.

====== Final ======
11 June 2025
20:00

| 's-Gravenzande | 0–1 | Groene Ster |

14 June 2025
14:30

| Groene Ster | 4–3 | 's-Gravenzande |

Groene Ster won 5–3 on aggregate.

===== Bracket 2 =====
Semifinals
XerxesDZB | 1 | 2 | 3
Orion | 0 | 2 | 2
OJC | 2 | 1 | 3
RBC | 3 | 2 | 5

Final
XerxesDZB | 0 | 2 | 2
RBC | 5 | 0 | 5

====== Semifinals ======
28 May 2025
20:00

| RBC | 3–2 | OJC |

1 June 2025
14:00

| OJC | 1–2 | RBC |

RBC won 5–3 on aggregate.

28 May 2025
20:00

| Orion | 0–1 | XerxesDZB |

31 May 2025
14:30

| XerxesDZB | 2–2 | Orion |

XerxesDZB won 3–2 on aggregate.

====== Final ======
4 June 2025
20:00

| RBC | 5–0 | XerxesDZB |

7 June 2025
14:30

| XerxesDZB | 2–0 | RBC |

RBC won 5–2 on aggregate.
