= 2011–12 Eerste Klasse =

Eerste Klasse
- Season: 2011–12
- Relegated: 2012–13 Tweede Klasse

2011–12 Eerste Klasse was a Dutch association football season of the Eerste Klasse.

Saturday champions were:

- A: Ajax Amateurs
- B: VV Smitshoek
- C: SteDoCo
- D: DTS Ede
- E: HZVV

Sunday champions were:

- A: HFC EDO
- B: Quick Den Haag
- C: RKVV Brabantia
- D: RKSV Schijndel
- E: VV De Bataven
- F: VV Nieuw Buinen
