= HSV Hoek =

Dutch football club

- Full name: Hoekse Sportvereniging Hoek
- Nickname: Denoek
- Founded: 1950; 76 years ago
- Ground: Sportpark Denoek; Hoek
- Capacity: 2,500
- Chairman: Ad van Langevelde
- Manager: Gérard de Nooijer
- League: Tweede Divisie
- 2025–26: Tweede Divisie, 2nd of 18
Home colours	Away colours

Hoekse Sportvereniging Hoek, known as HSV Hoek, is a football club based in Hoek, Zeeland, Netherlands, that competes in the Tweede Divisie, the third tier of football in the Netherlands.

== History ==
The club was founded in 1950. Indian football legend Syed Abdul Rahim has appeared with the club in 1950. They have emerged as the champions of the Hoofdklasse twice in 1995–96, 2013–14 season. It is currently playing in the Third Division, the fourth tier of football in the Netherlands.

The club became champions of the 2024–25 Derde Divisie and secured a place in the highest amateur division, the Tweede Divisie.

== Current squad ==
As of 24 October 2026

Note: Flags indicate national team as defined under FIFA eligibility rules; some limited exceptions apply. Players may hold more than one non-FIFA nationality.

No.	Pos.	Nation	Player
1	GK	BEL	Milan Standaert
2	DF	HAI	Rousseau De Poorter
3	DF	BOE	Jevairo Pengel
4	DF	BEL	Leonard Ketels
5	DF	NED	Yanilio de Nooijer
7	MF	BEL	Kevin Hebbelinck
8	MF	BEL	Sebastiaan Brebels
9	FW	NED	Tom Boere
10	FW	BEL	Noah Aelterman
11	FW	BOE	Myron Bostdorp
14	MF	BEL	Robbie Van Hauter

No.	Pos.	Nation	Player
15	DF	BEL	Cederick Van Daele
16	MF	NED	Marnick Steenpoorte
17	FW	BEL	Paco Avoki
18	MF	BEL	Hamza Bouihrouchane
19	FW	BEL	Amadu Jalloh
20	MF	NED	Junior van Beveren
21	DF	BEL	Gertjan Martens
22	FW	PHI	Dylan Demuynck
25	DF	NED	Gylermo Siereveld
30	GK	BEL	Sef Van Damme

== Honours ==
- Hoofdklasse
  - Winners (2): 1995–96, 2013–14
- KNVB Cup
  - Round of 16 (1): 2003–04
- KNVB District Cup
  - Winners (3): 2012–13, 2014–15, 2016–17
  - Runner-up (4): 1994–95, 1996–97, 2002–03, 2010–11

== Managers ==
Dates	Name	Notes
1999–2000	(Netherlands) Frans Vermeulen	
2000–2003	(Netherlands) Angelo Nijskens	player-coach
2003	(Netherlands) Patrick Naudts	caretaker
2003	(Netherlands) Cees Houtepen	
2003–2004	(Netherlands) Johan Ballegeer	
2004–2005	(Belgium) Eric Tetaert	
2005–2006	(Belgium) Eddy Mestdagh	
2006–2007	(Netherlands) Cees Houtepen	
2007	(Netherlands) Wim Hofkens	
2007	(Netherlands) Paul Telussa	caretaker
2007–2008	(Netherlands) Willem Leushuis	
2008–2010	(Netherlands) Paul Telussa	
2010–2011	(Belgium) Gaby Demanet	
2011–2012	(Netherlands) Ruud Pennings	
2012	(Netherlands) Eric Hellemons	
2012–2014	(Belgium) Kenny Verhoene	
2015	(Netherlands) Ruud Pennings	
2015–2018	(Belgium) Jannes Tant	
2018	(Netherlands) Dennis de Nooijer	
2019	(Belgium) Hugo Vandenheede	
2019–2021	(Belgium) Lieven Gevaert	
2021	(Belgium) Steven De Groot	
2022	(Belgium) Lorenzo Staelens	
2022	(Belgium) Björn De Neve	
2022–2023	(Netherlands) Pieter Ongena	caretaker
2023–2024	(Belgium) Maxime Decraene	
2024–	(Netherlands) Gérard de Nooijer	

== See also ==
- List of football clubs in the Netherlands
