= VV Goes =

Association football club in Goes, Netherlands

- Full name: Voetbalvereniging Gezamenlijk Opwaarts Eendrachtig Sterk
- Founded: 15 September 1895; 130 years ago
- Ground: Sportpark Het Schenge, Goes
- Chairman: Frank de Bie
- Manager: Giovanni Siereveld
- League: Derde Divisie
- 2024–25: Derde Divisie B, 14th of 18
- Website: https://www.vvgoes.nl/
Home colours

VV Goes (backronym for Voetbalvereniging Gezamenlijk Opwaarts Eendrachtig Sterk, self-styled as GOES) is a football club from Goes, Netherlands. In the 1911–1912 season Goes played in the second tier of Dutch football. Over the years Goes played mostly in the Tweede and Derde Klasse. In the national 1934–35 KNVB Cup Goes started and lost third round against VV Terneuzen (2–0). It was booted first round in 1957–58 by NOAD (2–4) and in 2011–12 by Zwaluwen Vlaardingen (1–5). Since the 1990s Goes played at times in the Eerste Klasse. In 2017 the club promoted and began its third season in the Hoofdklasse, where it has previous played from 2012 to 2014.

== History ==
=== 1895–1899: Foundation of Zeelandia and initial years ===
The club was founded on 15 September 1895 as Zeelandia by Louis Schneider (14) and Samuel Houwer (15). At that time it was the second-oldest soccer club in Zeeland, beaten only by Olympia from Middelburg that was founded 1 December 1894.

By 1997 eleven Zeeland clubs joined the newly formed competition of the Zeeland Football Association. The first squad of Zeelandia Goes played its first game in the new competition on 4 November 1899 against the visiting second team of Olympia Middelburg, beating the guests 3–2.

=== 1900–1929: Zeeland Vooruit reaches the Dutch second tier ===
In 1901 Zeelandia won the Zeeland competition.

In 1910 the club was forced to change names after Zeelandia from Middelburg (Olympia merged in 1916 into this club) was first to become members at the Dutch national football association, NVB. The new club name was Zeeland Vooruit only partially caught on.

In 1912 Zeeland Vooruit became champion of its Derde Klasse section and promoted to the Tweede Klasse, then the second tier of soccer in the Netherlands. In 1914 it returned to the Derde Klasse.

In 1914 a second club was founded in Goes. Hollandia was a club for the working class. After it had started playing on the same field in 1917 both clubs merged under the name Goese Voetbalvereniging, abbreviated as GVV.

Throughout the 1920s Goes played stable in the Derde Klasse.

=== 1930–1959: VV Goes strong, not promoting with De Munck ===
In 1935 GVV took another Derde Klasse championship and returned to the Tweede Klasse. In 1937 the current name was adopted: Voetbalvereniging Goes, self-styled as G.O.E.S. or GOES, where Goes stands in backronym for: Together upwards, united strong.

In 1938 the first squad was strengthened by Goes' 16 year old homegrown goalie Frans de Munck, who continued to an impressive national and international career. Aside from the hardships of World War II, De Munck's years in the first team were marked by championships in 1943 and 1944. The team did not promote as it failed to pass the playoffs.

In 1946 another Tweede Klasse championship followed without promotion. Throughout the 1950s Goes played steadily in the Tweede Klasse.

=== 1960–1999: Bouncing all over the competitions ===
In 1961 Goes relegated to the Derde Klasse. In 1966, the only relegation to Vierde Klasse followed. In 1968 Goes won a Vierde Klasse championship and promoted.

In 1971 Goes was champion in the Derde Klasse and promoted. It didn't last long in the Tweede Klasse as in 1973 it relegated again. That same year members of Goes arrested a burglar after a series of burglaries into their clubhouse.

It took until 1989 to return to the Tweede Klasse, after a Derde Klasse championship.

In 1993 Goes promoted for the very first time to the Eerste Klasse. This achievement came after Goes reached the third position Tweede Klasse yet proved successful in the playoffs. The first season in the Eerste was encouraging, with Goes finishing in 4th position. Second season, however, Goes relegated from 12th position. It took only two years to return to the Eerste through playoffs. Two years later Goes went back to the Tweede after relegating again from 12th position.

=== 2000–2019: From Derde Klasse to Derde Divisie ===
In 2000 Goes relegated to the Derde Klasse. In 2009 Goes won a championship and promoted to the Tweede Klasse.

In 2011 Goes promoted to the Eerste Klasse through playoffs. Thomas van den Houten played in Goes 2011–2012, the season after which Goes promoted to the Hoofdklasse for the very first time. Van den Houten moved on to play for Hoofdklasse regular HSV Hoek. Gérard de Nooijer coached VV Goes 2012–2013, during its first year in the Hoofdklasse. Goes almost relegated that season from 12th position. De Nooijer was fired by Goes after he had preferred to be at an important game of FC Dordrecht, where he served as assistant coach. De Nooijer was replaced by Jan Poortvliet who relegated in 2014 with the team from 11th position. After relegating officials of the club and family members had been threatened, including death threats. In 2014 Goes chairman, Henk Zwartelé, resigned over the impact of the main sponsor on daily operations.

Coach Poortvliet suddenly left for a coaching position in China in September 2015. In October 2015 John Karelse, who had just separated from NAC Breda, took over as manager. On 5 June 2017 Goes promoted for the second time to the Hoofdklasse, beating FC Boshuizen in Leiden, 2–4. Remon de Vlieger and Steve Schalkwijk scored two goals each, after Boshuizen had already taken a lead. As Goes prepared for its return the Hoofdklasse, it lost at home against Eredivisie-side Sparta Rotterdam, 0–10. A year after returning to the Hoofdklasse, in 2019 Goes promoted from runner-up position to the Derde Divisie.

=== 2020–: Mostly Derde Divisie ===
Finishing 4th, Goes did well in its first season in the Derde. In the playoffs it lost twice against FC Lienden. The second season in the Derde started was a series of defeats but by December 2019 the team started improving. In October 2020, the club made Zeeland footballing history in the KNVB Cup fixture against ODIN '59, beating the record for most penalty kicks taken in a competitive game in Zeeland ever, with 34. The former record was held by DOSKO and VV Terneuzen, who kicked 30 penalties in 2000 before a winner was found. With Aruban international Matthew Lentink in goal, Goes eventually lost to ODIN, and was knocked out of the competition. In 2024, Goes won a Vierde Divisie championship and returned to the Derde Divisie. In the de Derde Divisie it struggled at the bottom of the competition.
