= Gérard de Nooijer =

Dutch footballer and manager (born 1969)

Personal information
- Date of birth: 4 April 1969 (age 57)
- Place of birth: Oost-Souburg, Netherlands
- Height: 1.84 m (6 ft 0 in)
- Position: Centre-back

Team information
- Current team: HSV Hoek (head coach)

Youth career
- RCS Oost-Souburg

Senior career*
Years	Team	Apps	(Gls)
1988–1998	Sparta Rotterdam	224	(12)
1998–2002	Heerenveen	117	(17)
2002–2004	Feyenoord	22	(0)
2004–2006	Dordrecht	58	(6)
Total		421	(35)

Managerial career
- 2009–2011: Dauwendaele
- 2012–2013: VV Goes
- 2013–2016: FC Dordrecht (assistant)
- 2016–2018: FC Dordrecht
- 2019: Dalian Istar H&C (academy)
- 2020–2021: Sparta Rotterdam (assistant)
- 2022–2023: Dalian Istar H&C (academy)
- 2024: SC Kruisland
- 2024–: HSV Hoek
- * Club domestic league appearances and goals

Gérard de Nooijer (born 4 April 1969) is a Dutch football manager and former player who is the head coach of club HSV Hoek.

== Playing career ==
De Nooijer played as a defender for Sparta Rotterdam (1988–1998), SC Heerenveen (1998–2003), Feyenoord Rotterdam (2003–2004) and FC Dordrecht (2004–2005).

== Coaching career ==
In the 2020–21 season, he worked as assistant coach with Sparta Rotterdam.

In March 2024, De Nooijer was appointed head coach of HSV Hoek ahead of the 2024–25.

== Personal life ==
He is the twin brother of striker Dennis de Nooijer, who also played professional football during the late 1980s and 1990s.

His son Bradley de Nooijer is now a professional footballer.
