= Terneuzense Boys =

Dutch football club

VV Terneuzense Boys
- Full name: Voetbalvereniging Terneuzense Boys
- Founded: 1 May 1949
- Ground: Zuidersportpark, Terneuzen
- Chairman: Peter van den Kieboom
- Manager: Hubert van den Hemel
- League: Eerste klasse Saturday
Home colours

Voetbalvereniging Terneuzense Boys (founded 1949) is an association football club in Terneuzen, Netherlands. Since 2019 Terneuzense Boys plays in the Eerste Klasse. Its home ground is Zuidersportpark and colors since foundation orange and black.

== History ==
Terneuzense Boys was founded on 1 May 1949. At foundation 45 players registered, enabling it to immediately start with two teams. The first squad is marked by three distinct periods. From 1949 through 1961 (12 years) it played outside the national league system of the KNVB.

From 1961 through 1998 (37 years) it played exclusively in the Vierde and Derde Klasse. During this period it won section championships in the Vierde Klasse in 1966 and in the Derde Klasse in 1998.

Since 1998 Terneuzense Boys hovers between Tweede and Eerste Klasse, playing mostly in the upper half of the Tweede. During this period it won Tweede Klasse section championships in 2006, 2008, 2012, and 2019. In 2008 and 2012 it immediately rebounded after Eerste Klasse relegation. In January 2020, six cars of Terneuzense Boys players were attacked in Belgium. In April 2020 the first squad was heading towards relegation when relegation and promotion were frozen due to the COVID-19 pandemic.

=== Chief coach ===
- (Netherlands) Jan Koch (1970–1974)
- (Netherlands) Joop de Jonge (while player, 1974)
- (Netherlands) Wies van Avermaete (1974–1977)
- (Netherlands) Rini Dey (1977–1980)
- (Netherlands) Guust Voet (1980–1982)
- (Netherlands) Arie Dekker (1982–1987)
- (Netherlands) Jan Dooms (1987–1989)
- (Netherlands) Arie Dekker (1989–1991)
- (Netherlands) Jan Dooms (interim, 1991)
- (Netherlands) Bert Timmers (1991)
- (Belgium) Maurice de Windt (1991–1992)
- (Netherlands) Kees Pladdet (1992–1994)
- (Netherlands) Joop de Jonge (1994)
- (Netherlands) Wim Pauw (interim, 1994–1995)
- (Netherlands) Jaap Goossen (1995–1999)
- (Netherlands) Eddy van der Hooft (1999–2002)
- (Netherlands) Henk Ottens (2002–2005)
- (Netherlands) Danny van de Velde (2005–2007)
- (Netherlands) Leendert Geelhoed (2007–2009)
- (Netherlands) Karl Vergouwen (2009–2011)
- (Netherlands) Arie Dekker (interim, 2011)
- (Netherlands) Eddy van der Hooft (2011–2013)
- (Netherlands) Alexander van Keulen (2013–2015)
- (Netherlands) Diederik Hiensch (2015–2018)
- (Netherlands) Hubert van den Hemel (since 2018)
