= 2022–23 FC Bayern Munich season =

124th season in existence of Bayern Munich

Bayern Munich
2022–23 season
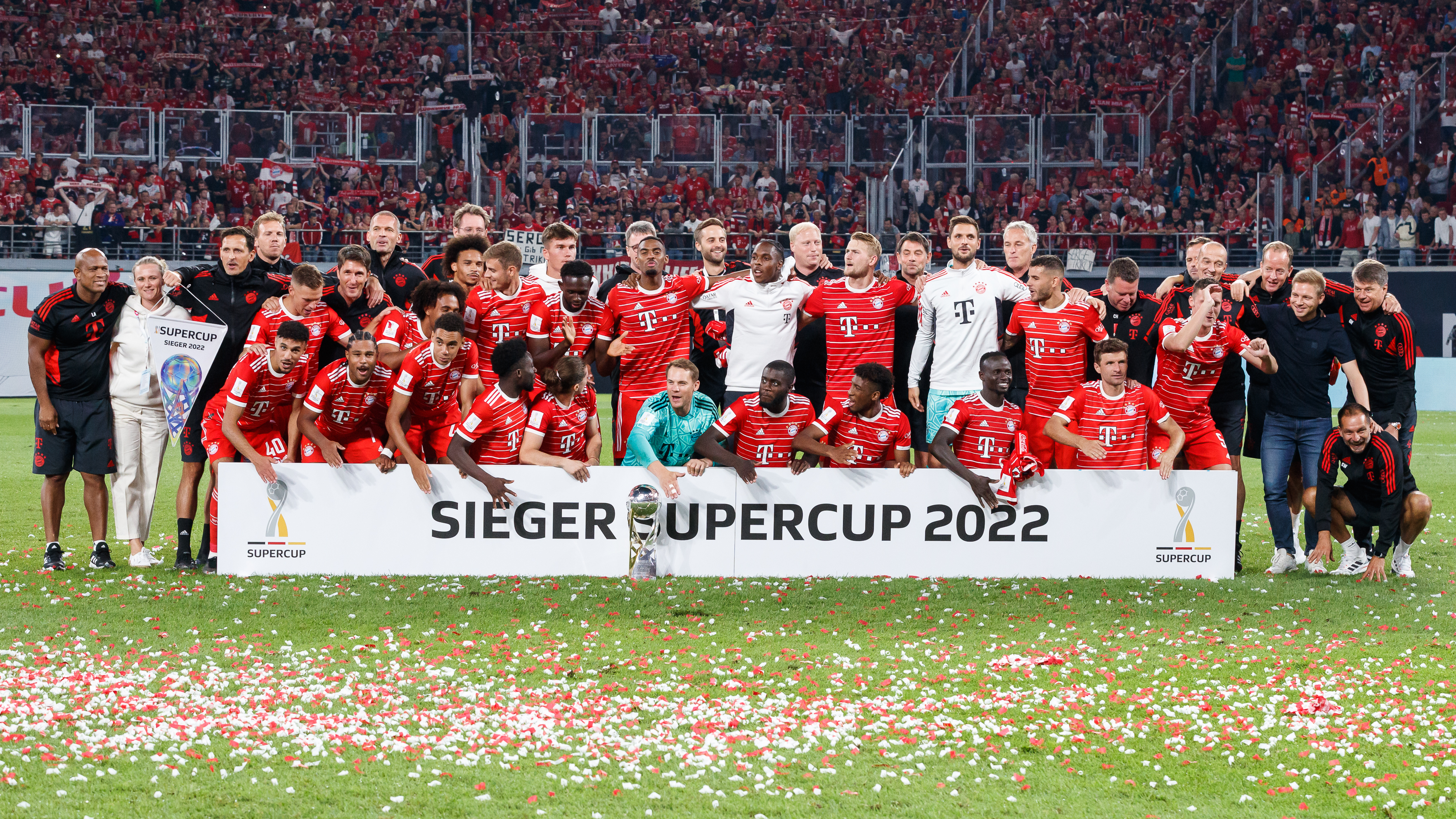
- Bayern Munich players celebrating their 10th DFL-Supercup title
- President: Herbert Hainer
- CEO: Oliver Kahn
- Head coach: Julian Nagelsmann (until 24 March); Thomas Tuchel (from 24 March)
- Stadium: Allianz Arena
- Bundesliga: 1st
- DFB-Pokal: Quarter-finals
- DFL-Supercup: Winners
- UEFA Champions League: Quarter-finals
- Top goalscorer: League: Serge Gnabry (14); All: Eric Maxim Choupo-Moting; Serge Gnabry (17 each)
- Biggest win: VfL Bochum 0–7 Bayern Munich; 21 August 2022, Bundesliga
- Biggest defeat: Manchester City 3–0 Bayern Munich; 11 April 2023, UEFA Champions League
Home colours	Away colours	Third colours

2023–24 home kit, used in the last home game of the season against RB Leipzig.

The 2022–23 season was the 124th season in the history of Bayern Munich and their 58th consecutive season in the top flight of German football. In addition to the domestic league, they participated in this season's editions of the DFB-Pokal, DFL-Supercup and UEFA Champions League.

The season was notable as it was the first since 2013–14 without Robert Lewandowski, who departed to FC Barcelona, and first since 2016–17 without Niklas Süle, who departed to rivals Borussia Dortmund in the same window.

== Season overview ==
On 24 March 2023, Thomas Tuchel was announced as the new head coach mid-season, replacing Julian Nagelsmann, who was dismissed. Four days later, the club made a formal approach to Chelsea first-team assistant coach Anthony Barry, who worked with Tuchel (primarily on set pieces) during his time at Chelsea (2021–22). Tuchel's first game, Bayern defeated rivals Borussia Dortmund 4–2 at home to leapfrog them in the league table to first. His second game was a 2–1 home defeat to Freiburg in the quarter-final match of the DFB-Pokal; the defeat meant that Bayern had failed to win the competition for three consecutive seasons for the first time in the 21st century. In Tuchel's fourth match, Bayern were defeated by Manchester City 3–0 at the City of Manchester Stadium in the first leg of the Champions League quarter-finals, raising further questions regarding the board's decision to sack Nagelsmann. Later, Bayern stabilized the situation after several convincing victories in the league, including a 6–0 thrashing of Schalke 04 at the Allianz Arena. However, a 1–3 home defeat to RB Leipzig in the penultimate match jeopardized Bayern's chances of winning an 11th consecutive Bundesliga title, as they were now trailing Borussia Dortmund by two points before the final round of games. Going into the final match-day on 27 May, Dortmund needed a home win over Mainz 05 to clinch the title, irrespective of Bayern's result. However, they drew 2–2, and Jamal Musiala's late winner against 1. FC Köln sealed the 11th consecutive Bundesliga for Bayern. This was the first time since the 1999–2000 season that the title was decided on goal difference.

== Players ==
=== Squad ===
As of 31 January 2023

Note: Flags indicate national team as defined under FIFA eligibility rules; some limited exceptions apply. Players may hold more than one non-FIFA nationality.

No.	Pos.	Nation	Player
1	GK	GER	Manuel Neuer (captain)
2	DF	FRA	Dayot Upamecano
4	DF	NED	Matthijs de Ligt
5	DF	FRA	Benjamin Pavard
6	MF	GER	Joshua Kimmich
7	FW	GER	Serge Gnabry
8	MF	GER	Leon Goretzka
10	FW	GER	Leroy Sané
11	FW	FRA	Kingsley Coman
13	FW	CMR	Eric Maxim Choupo-Moting
14	MF	AUT	Paul Wanner
17	FW	SEN	Sadio Mané
19	MF	CAN	Alphonso Davies

No.	Pos.	Nation	Player
20	DF	SEN	Bouna Sarr
21	DF	FRA	Lucas Hernandez
22	DF	POR	João Cancelo (on loan from Manchester City)
23	DF	NED	Daley Blind
25	FW	GER	Thomas Müller (vice-captain)
26	GK	GER	Sven Ulreich
27	GK	SUI	Yann Sommer
35	GK	GER	Johannes Schenk
38	MF	NED	Ryan Gravenberch
39	FW	FRA	Mathys Tel
40	DF	MAR	Noussair Mazraoui
42	MF	GER	Jamal Musiala
44	DF	CRO	Josip Stanišić
46	MF	GER	Arijon Ibrahimović

== Transfers ==
=== In ===
No.	Pos.	Player	Transferred from	Fee	Date	Source
–	FW	(Italy) Manuel Pisano	(Italy) Juventus U16	Free transfer, will join Bayern Munich U17	11 May 2022	
–	DF	(Croatia) Antonio Tikvić	(Germany) Türkgücü München	Free transfer, will join Bayern Munich II	1 July 2022	
40	DF	(Morocco) Noussair Mazraoui	(Netherlands) Ajax	Free transfer	1 July 2022	
38	MF	(Netherlands) Ryan Gravenberch	(Netherlands) Ajax	€18,500,000	1 July 2022	
17	FW	(Senegal) Sadio Mané	(England) Liverpool	€32,000,000	1 July 2022	
32	FW	(Netherlands) Joshua Zirkzee	(Belgium) Anderlecht	Loan return	1 July 2022	
15	DF	(United States) Chris Richards	(Germany) 1899 Hoffenheim	Loan return	1 July 2022	
33	DF	(Germany) Lars Lukas Mai	(Germany) Werder Bremen	Loan return	1 July 2022	
39	GK	(Germany) Ron-Thorben Hoffmann	(England) Sunderland	Loan return	1 July 2022	
–	FW	(Germany) Fiete Arp	(Germany) Holstein Kiel	Loan return	1 July 2022	
–	MF	(Denmark) Jonathan Asp Jensen	(Denmark) Midtjylland	€1,200,000; will join Bayern Munich U17	1 July 2022	
–	MF	(Germany) Noël Aséko Nkili	(Germany) Hertha BSC U17	€1,000,000; will join Bayern Munich U19	13 July 2022	
4	DF	(Netherlands) Matthijs de Ligt	(Italy) Juventus	€67,000,000	19 July 2022	
39	FW	(France) Mathys Tel	(France) Rennes	€20,000,000	26 July 2022	
–	DF	(Spain) Adam Aznou	(Spain) Barcelona	Free transfer, will join Bayern Munich U17	28 July 2022	
–	FW	(Benin) Désiré Segbé Azankpo	(France) Dunkerque	Free transfer, will join Bayern Munich II	31 July 2022	
–	MF	(Nigeria) Daniel Francis	(Nigeria) Hearts of Abuja	Undisclosed, will join Bayern Munich II	4 August 2022	
–	MF	(South Korea) Lee Hyun-ju	(South Korea) Pohang Steelers	Undisclosed, will join Bayern Munich II	9 August 2022	
–	MF	(Georgia (country)) Luka Parkadze	(Georgia (country)) Dinamo Tbilisi	€240,000; will join Bayern Munich II	18 August 2022	
–	DF	(Germany) Bright Arrey-Mbi	(Germany) 1. FC Köln	Loan return	30 August 2022	
–	MF	(Japan) Taichi Fukui	(Japan) Sagan Tosu	€400,000; will join Bayern Munich II in January 2023	27 September 2022	
–	MF	(Spain) Javier Fernández	(Spain) Atlético Madrid	Free transfer, will join Bayern Munich U19 in January 2023	28 November 2022	
–	DF	(Bosnia and Herzegovina) Nick Salihamidžić	(Canada) Whitecaps FC 2	Loan return	1 January 2023	
23	DF	(Netherlands) Daley Blind	(Netherlands) Ajax	Free transfer	5 January 2023	
27	GK	(Switzerland) Yann Sommer	(Germany) Borussia Mönchengladbach	€8,000,000	19 January 2023	
–	FW	(Germany) Lenn Jastremski	(Germany) Erzgebirge Aue	Loan return	30 January 2023	
22	DF	(Portugal) João Cancelo	(England) Manchester City	Loan	31 January 2023	
–	GK	(China) Liu Shaoziyang	Austria Klagenfurt	Loan return	31 January 2023	
–	FW	(Germany) Maximilian Wagner	(Germany) VfB Stuttgart U19	Free transfer, will join Bayern Munich II in July 2023	13 April 2023	
–	DF	(Croatia) Ljubo Puljić	(Croatia) NK Osijek U17	Undisclosed, will join Bayern Munich U17 in July 2023	31 May 2023	

Total spending:▼€148,340,000

=== Out ===
No.	Pos.	Player	Transferred to	Fee	Date	Source
4	DF	(Germany) Niklas Süle	(Germany) Borussia Dortmund	Free transfer	1 July 2022	
–	FW	(Germany) Nicolas-Gerrit Kühn	(Austria) Rapid Wien	€500,000	1 July 2022	
–	MF	(Germany) Maximilian Welzmüller	(Germany) SpVgg Unterhaching	Free transfer	1 July 2022	
–	MF	(Germany) Nicolas Feldhahn	Retired		1 July 2022	
22	MF	(Spain) Marc Roca	(England) Leeds United	€12,000,000	1 July 2022	
24	MF	(France) Corentin Tolisso	(France) Lyon	Free transfer	1 July 2022	
32	MF	(Germany) Christopher Scott	(Belgium) Antwerp	€1,400,000	1 July 2022	
33	DF	(Germany) Lars Lukas Mai	(Switzerland) Lugano	€1,600,000	1 July 2022	
36	GK	(Germany) Christian Früchtl	Austria Wien	€500,000	1 July 2022	
37	MF	(United States) Taylor Booth	(Netherlands) Utrecht	Free transfer	1 July 2022	
39	GK	(Germany) Ron-Thorben Hoffmann	(Germany) Eintracht Braunschweig	Free transfer	1 July 2022	
–	DF	(Germany) Jamie Lawrence	(Germany) 1. FC Magdeburg	Loan	1 July 2022	
–	FW	(Germany) Lenn Jastremski	(Germany) Erzgebirge Aue	Loan	1 July 2022	
47	FW	(Germany) Armindo Sieb	(Germany) Greuther Fürth	€50,000	1 July 2022	
–	FW	(Germany) Marvin Çuni	(Germany) 1. FC Saarbrücken	Loan	1 July 2022	
–	MF	(Germany) Torben Rhein	Austria Lustenau	Loan	1 July 2022	
–	FW	(Germany) Fiete Arp	(Germany) Holstein Kiel	Free transfer	1 July 2022	
–	DF	(Madagascar) Rémy Vita	(Netherlands) Fortuna Sittard	Undisclosed	5 July 2022	
–	MF	(Sweden) Alex Timossi Andersson	(Netherlands) Heerenveen	€550,000	6 July 2022	
–	DF	(Bosnia and Herzegovina) Nick Salihamidžić	(Canada) Whitecaps FC 2	Loan	8 July 2022	
–	MF	(Turkey) Kenan Yıldız	(Italy) Juventus U19	Free transfer	9 July 2022	
3	DF	(England) Omar Richards	(England) Nottingham Forest	€8,500,000	10 July 2022	
37	MF	(United States) Malik Tillman	(Scotland) Rangers	Loan	15 July 2022	
9	FW	(Poland) Robert Lewandowski	(Spain) Barcelona	€45,000,000	16 July 2022	
–	MF	(New Zealand) Sarpreet Singh	(Germany) Jahn Regensburg	Loan	27 July 2022	
15	DF	(United States) Chris Richards	(England) Crystal Palace	€12,000,000	27 July 2022	
–	MF	(Nigeria) Daniel Francis	Austria Klagenfurt II	Loan	5 August 2022	
23	DF	(France) Tanguy Nianzou	(Spain) Sevilla	€16,000,000	17 August 2022	
43	MF	(Germany) Adrian Fein	(Netherlands) Excelsior	Free transfer	23 August 2022	
28	MF	(Croatia) Gabriel Vidović	(Netherlands) Vitesse	Loan	30 August 2022	
32	FW	(Netherlands) Joshua Zirkzee	(Italy) Bologna	€8,500,000	30 August 2022	
–	DF	(Germany) Bright Arrey-Mbi	(Germany) Hannover 96	Loan	30 August 2022	
–	MF	(Austria) Emilian Metu	Austria Klagenfurt	Loan	30 August 2022	
–	DF	(Bosnia and Herzegovina) Nick Salihamidžić	(Italy) Cosenza	Loan	27 January 2023	
18	MF	(Austria) Marcel Sabitzer	(England) Manchester United	Loan	31 January 2023	
–	FW	(Germany) Lenn Jastremski	(Austria) Grazer AK	Loan	31 January 2023	
–	GK	(China) Liu Shaoziyang	(Austria) Grazer AK	Loan	4 February 2023	
–	DF	(Germany) David Herold	(Austria) Rheindorf Altach	Loan	6 February 2023	
–	MF	(Germany) Jahn Herrmann	(Austria) Blau-Weiß Linz	Undisclosed	6 February 2023	

Total income:▲€106,600,000

== Pre-season and friendlies ==
Win Draw Loss Fixtures

20 July 2022 Audi Summer Tour	D.C. United	2–6	Bayern Munich	Washington, D.C., United States
19:30 EDT (UTC−4)	Pines (yellow card) 38'; Simonsen 54'; Durkin (yellow card) 55'; Djeffal (yellow card) 74'; Ku-DiPietro 83'	Report	Mané 5' (pen.); Sabitzer 12'; Gnabry 44'; De Ligt 47', (yellow card) 71'; Zirkzee 51'; Müller 90+2'	Stadium: Audi Field; Attendance: 20,000; Referee: Matthew Franz (United States)

23 July 2022 Audi Summer Tour	Bayern Munich	0–1	Manchester City	Green Bay, United States
18:15 CDT (UTC−5)	Kimmich (yellow card) 36'; Pavard (yellow card) 56'; Hernandez (yellow card) 68'	Report	Haaland 12'; Cancelo (yellow card) 64'; Phillips (yellow card) 66'	Stadium: Lambeau Field; Attendance: 78,128; Referee: Matthew Thompson (United States)
Note: The start of the match was postponed for 15 minutes due to lightning. The length of the match was shortened to 80 minutes after a second lightning delay in the first half.

13 January 2023 Friendly	Bayern Munich	4–4	Red Bull Salzburg	Munich, Germany
18:00 CET (UTC+1)	Sané 9'; Ibrahimović 69'; Coman 71'; Tel 88'	Report	Koïta 17'; Konaté 51'; Okafor 54', 89'	Stadium: FC Bayern Campus; Attendance: 2,500; Referee: Felix Brych (Germany)

== Competitions ==
=== Overall record ===
Competition	First match	Last match	Starting round	Final position	Record							
Competition	First match	Last match	Starting round	Final position	Pld	W	D	L	GF	GA	GD	Win %
Bundesliga	5 August 2022	27 May 2023	Matchday 1	Winners	34	21	8	5	92	38	+54	61.76
DFB-Pokal	31 August 2022	4 April 2023	First round	Quarter-finals	4	3	0	1	15	4	+11	75.00
DFL-Supercup	30 July 2022		Final	Winners	1	1	0	0	5	3	+2	100.00
UEFA Champions League	7 September 2022	19 April 2023	Group stage	Quarter-finals	10	8	1	1	22	6	+16	80.00
Total					49	33	9	7	134	51	+83	67.35

Source: Soccerway

=== Bundesliga ===
==== League table ====
Pos	Team	Pld	W	D	L	GF	GA	GD	Pts	Qualification or relegation
1	Bayern Munich (C)	34	21	8	5	92	38	+54	71	Qualification for the Champions League group stage
2	Borussia Dortmund	34	22	5	7	83	44	+39	71	Qualification for the Champions League group stage
3	RB Leipzig	34	20	6	8	64	41	+23	66	Qualification for the Champions League group stage
4	Union Berlin	34	18	8	8	51	38	+13	62	Qualification for the Champions League group stage
5	SC Freiburg	34	17	8	9	51	44	+7	59	Qualification for the Europa League group stage (Note: Since the 2022–23 DFB-Pokal winners, RB Leipzig, qualified for the Champions League based on league position, the Europa League group stage spot was passed to the sixth-placed team, and the Europa Conference League play-off round spot was passed to the seventh-placed team.)

Source: DFB
Rules for classification: 1) Points; 2) Goal difference; 3) Goals scored; 4) Head-to-head results; 5) Head-to-head away goals scored; 6) Away goals scored; 7) Play-off.
(C) Champions

==== Results summary ====
Overall								Home						Away					
Pld	W	D	L	GF	GA	GD	Pts	W	D	L	GF	GA	GD	W	D	L	GF	GA	GD
34	21	8	5	92	38	+54	71	11	5	1	53	17	+36	10	3	4	39	21	+18

Source: DFB

==== Results by round ====
Round	1	2	3	4	5	6	7	8	9	10	11	12	13	14	15	16	17	18	19	20	21	22	23	24	25	26	27	28	29	30	31	32	33	34
Ground	A	H	A	H	A	H	A	H	A	H	A	H	A	H	A	A	H	H	A	H	A	H	A	H	A	H	A	H	A	H	A	H	H	A
Result	W	W	W	D	D	D	L	W	D	W	W	W	W	W	W	D	D	D	W	W	L	W	W	W	L	W	W	D	L	W	W	W	L	W
Position	1	1	1	1	3	3	5	3	3	2	2	2	1	1	1	1	1	1	1	1	1	1	1	1	2	1	1	1	2	1	1	1	2	1

Source: DFB
A = Away; H = Home; W = Win; D = Draw; L = Loss

==== Matches ====
The league fixtures were announced on 17 June 2022.

5 August 2022 1	Eintracht Frankfurt	1–6	Bayern Munich	Frankfurt
20:30 CEST (UTC+2)	Ndicka (yellow card) 59'; Kolo Muani 64'; Kostić (yellow card) 71'	Report	Kimmich 5'; Pavard 11'; Mané 29'; Musiala 35', 83'; Gnabry 43'	Stadium: Deutsche Bank Park; Attendance: 51,500; Referee: Deniz Aytekin

14 August 2022 2	Bayern Munich	2–0	VfL Wolfsburg	Munich
17:30 CEST (UTC+2)	Hernandez (yellow card) 15'; Ulreich (yellow card) 23'; Musiala 33'; Müller 44'	Report	Svanberg (yellow card) 52'	Stadium: Allianz Arena; Attendance: 75,000; Referee: Harm Osmers

21 August 2022 3	VfL Bochum	0–7	Bayern Munich	Bochum
17:30 CEST (UTC+2)	Janko (yellow card) 46'	Report	Sané 4'; De Ligt 25'; Coman 33'; Mané 42', 60' (pen.); Gamboa 69' (o.g.); Gnabry 76'	Stadium: Vonovia Ruhrstadion; Attendance: 26,000; Referee: Daniel Siebert

27 August 2022 4	Bayern Munich	1–1	Borussia Mönchengladbach	Munich
18:30 CEST (UTC+2)	Kimmich (yellow card) 42'; Sabitzer (yellow card) 63'; Sané (yellow card) 80', (goal) 83'; Pavard (yellow card) 90+5'	Report	Pléa (yellow card) 37'; Thuram 43'; Kramer (yellow card) 90+5'	Stadium: Allianz Arena; Attendance: 75,000; Referee: Daniel Schlager

3 September 2022 5	Union Berlin	1–1	Bayern Munich	Berlin
15:30 CEST (UTC+2)	Becker 12'; Khedira (yellow card) 87'	Report	Kimmich 15', (yellow card) 26'; Gravenberch (yellow card) 72'	Stadium: Stadion An der Alten Försterei; Attendance: 22,012; Referee: Frank Willenborg

10 September 2022 6	Bayern Munich	2–2	VfB Stuttgart	Munich
15:30 CEST (UTC+2)	Tel 36'; Musiala 60'; De Ligt (yellow card) 90+1'; Sané (yellow card) 90+4'	Report	Sosa (yellow card) 4'; Führich 57'; Ito (yellow card) 59'; Ahamada (yellow card) 79'; Anton (yellow card) 81'; Karazor (yellow card) 90'; Guirassy 90+2' (pen.)	Stadium: Allianz Arena; Attendance: 75,000; Referee: Christian Dingert

17 September 2022 7	FC Augsburg	1–0	Bayern Munich	Augsburg
15:30 CEST (UTC+2)	Berisha (yellow card) 31', (goal) 59'; Hahn (yellow card) 45'; Gouweleeuw (yellow card) 58'	Report	Mané (yellow card) 38'	Stadium: WWK Arena; Attendance: 30,660; Referee: Marco Fritz

30 September 2022 8	Bayern Munich	4–0	Bayer Leverkusen	Munich
20:30 CEST (UTC+2)	Sané 3'; Musiala 17'; Mané 39'; Müller 84'	Report		Stadium: Allianz Arena; Attendance: 75,000; Referee: Tobias Stieler

8 October 2022 9	Borussia Dortmund	2–2	Bayern Munich	Dortmund
18:30 CEST (UTC+2)	Bellingham (yellow card) 14'; Can (yellow card) 40'; Moukoko 74'; Adeyemi (yellow card) 90+2'; Modeste 90+5'	Report	Sabitzer (yellow card) 2'; De Ligt (yellow card) 11'; Goretzka 33', (yellow card) 57'; Sané 53', (yellow card) 90+2'; Coman (yellow card) 77' (yellow-red card) 90'	Stadium: Signal Iduna Park; Attendance: 81,365; Referee: Deniz Aytekin

16 October 2022 10	Bayern Munich	5–0	SC Freiburg	Munich
19:30 CEST (UTC+2)	Gnabry 13'; Choupo-Moting 33'; Sané 52'; Mané 55'; Sabitzer 80'	Report	Gregoritsch (yellow card) 50'; Sildillia (yellow card) 51'	Stadium: Allianz Arena; Attendance: 75,000; Referee: Sascha Stegemann

22 October 2022 11	1899 Hoffenheim	0–2	Bayern Munich	Sinsheim
15:30 CEST (UTC+2)	Baumgartner (yellow card) 33'; Prömel (yellow card) 68'; Kabak (yellow card) 80'	Report	Musiala 17'; Choupo-Moting 38'; Upamecano (yellow card) 51'; Kimmich (yellow card) 61'	Stadium: PreZero Arena; Attendance: 30,150; Referee: Sven Jablonski

29 October 2022 12	Bayern Munich	6–2	Mainz 05	Munich
15:30 CEST (UTC+2)	Gnabry 5'; Musiala 28'; Mané (penalty missed) 43', 43'; Goretzka 58'; Tel 79'; Choupo-Moting 86'; Pavard (yellow card) 88'	Report	Fernandes (yellow card) 34'; Burkardt (penalty missed) 45+3'; Widmer 45+4'; Ingvartsen 82'	Stadium: Allianz Arena; Attendance: 75,000; Referee: Benjamin Cortus

5 November 2022 13	Hertha BSC	2–3	Bayern Munich	Berlin
15:30 CET (UTC+1)	Lukebakio 40'; Selke 45' (pen.)	Report	Musiala 12'; Choupo-Moting 37', 38'	Stadium: Olympiastadion; Attendance: 74,667; Referee: Bastian Dankert

8 November 2022 14	Bayern Munich	6–1	Werder Bremen	Munich
20:30 CET (UTC+1)	Musiala 6'; Choupo-Moting (penalty missed) 17'; Gnabry 22', 28', 82'; Goretzka 26'; Tel 84'	Report	Jung 10'	Stadium: Allianz Arena; Attendance: 75,000; Referee: Robert Hartmann

12 November 2022 15	Schalke 04	0–2	Bayern Munich	Gelsenkirchen
18:30 CET (UTC+1)		Report	Gnabry 38'; Choupo-Moting 52'	Stadium: Veltins-Arena; Attendance: 62,271; Referee: Felix Zwayer

20 January 2023 16	RB Leipzig	1–1	Bayern Munich	Leipzig
20:30 CET (UTC+1)	Schlager (yellow card) 41'; Halstenberg 52'; Laimer (yellow card) 71'	Report	Musiala (yellow card) 35'; Choupo-Moting 37'; Goretzka (yellow card) 52'; Upamecano (yellow card) 66'	Stadium: Red Bull Arena; Attendance: 47,069; Referee: Daniel Siebert

24 January 2023 17	Bayern Munich	1–1	1. FC Köln	Munich
20:30 CET (UTC+1)	Kimmich 90'	Report	Shkiri 4'; Huseinbašić (yellow card) 12'	Stadium: Allianz Arena; Attendance: 75,000; Referee: Tobias Stieler

28 January 2023 18	Bayern Munich	1–1	Eintracht Frankfurt	Munich
18:30 CET (UTC+1)	De Ligt (yellow card) 8'; Sommer (yellow card) 25'; Sané 34'; Upamecano (yellow card) 56'	Report	Kolo Muani 69'; Borré (yellow card) 80'	Stadium: Allianz Arena; Attendance: 75,000; Referee: Sven Jablonski

5 February 2023 19	VfL Wolfsburg	2–4	Bayern Munich	Wolfsburg
17:30 CET (UTC+1)	Otávio (yellow card) 38'; Kamiński 44'; Svanberg 80'; Bornauw (yellow card) 90+5'	Report	Coman 9', 14'; Müller 19'; Kimmich (yellow card) 34' (yellow-red card) 54'; Sané (yellow card) 35'; Goretzka (yellow card) 45+2'; Musiala 73'; Wanner (yellow card) 90'; Tel (yellow card) 90+2'	Stadium: Volkswagen Arena; Attendance: 30,000; Referee: Harm Osmers

11 February 2023 20	Bayern Munich	3–0	VfL Bochum	Munich
15:30 CET (UTC+1)	Müller 41'; Coman 64'; Gnabry 74' (pen.); Tel (yellow card) 79'	Report	Ordets (yellow card) 89'	Stadium: Allianz Arena; Attendance: 75,000; Referee: Matthias Jöllenbeck

18 February 2023 21	Borussia Mönchengladbach	3–2	Bayern Munich	Mönchengladbach
15:30 CET (UTC+1)	Stindl 13'; Hofmann 55'; Thuram 84'	Report	Upamecano (red card) 8'; Choupo-Moting 35'; Goretzka (yellow card) 37'; Tel 90+3'	Stadium: Borussia-Park; Attendance: 54,042; Referee: Tobias Welz

26 February 2023 22	Bayern Munich	3–0	Union Berlin	Munich
17:30 CET (UTC+1)	Choupo-Moting 31'; Coman 40'; Musiala 45+1'; Pavard (yellow card) 84'	Report	Thorsby (yellow card) 33'	Stadium: Allianz Arena; Attendance: 75,000; Referee: Marco Fritz

4 March 2023 23	VfB Stuttgart	1–2	Bayern Munich	Stuttgart
18:30 CET (UTC+1)	Perea 88'	Report	De Ligt 39'; Choupo-Moting 62'	Stadium: Mercedes-Benz Arena; Attendance: 47,800; Referee: Christian Dingert

11 March 2023 24	Bayern Munich	5–3	FC Augsburg	Munich
15:30 CET (UTC+1)	Cancelo 15', (yellow card) 85'; Pavard 19', 35'; Sané 45'; De Ligt (yellow card) 59'; Davies 74'	Report	Berisha 3', 60' (pen.); Valentin (yellow card) 18'; Cardona 90+3'	Stadium: Allianz Arena; Attendance: 75,000; Referee: Florian Badstübner

19 March 2023 25	Bayer Leverkusen	2–1	Bayern Munich	Leverkusen
17:30 CET (UTC+1)	Frimpong (yellow card) 39'; Palacios 55' (pen.), 73' (pen.); Hincapié (yellow card) 83'	Report	Kimmich 22'; Pavard (yellow card) 43'; Stanišić (yellow card) 64'; Upamecano (yellow card) 73'	Stadium: BayArena; Attendance: 30,210; Referee: Tobias Stieler

1 April 2023 26	Bayern Munich	4–2	Borussia Dortmund	Munich
18:30 CEST (UTC+2)	Kobel 13' (o.g.); Müller 18', 23'; Coman 50'; Upamecano (yellow card) 64'	Report	Can (yellow card) 12', (goal) 72' (pen.); Malen 90'	Stadium: Allianz Arena; Attendance: 75,000; Referee: Marco Fritz

8 April 2023 27	SC Freiburg	0–1	Bayern Munich	Freiburg
15:30 CEST (UTC+2)	Kübler (yellow card) 90+1'; Höler (yellow card) 90+6'	Report	De Ligt 51'; Mané (yellow card) 74'; Kimmich (yellow card) 90+6'	Stadium: Europa-Park Stadion; Attendance: 34,700; Referee: Daniel Siebert

15 April 2023 28	Bayern Munich	1–1	1899 Hoffenheim	Munich
15:30 CEST (UTC+2)	Pavard 17', (yellow card) 57'; Upamecano (yellow card) 72'	Report	Kramarić 71'; Akpoguma (yellow card) 82'	Stadium: Allianz Arena; Attendance: 75,000; Referee: Bastian Dankert

22 April 2023 29	Mainz 05	3–1	Bayern Munich	Mainz
15:30 CEST (UTC+2)	Martín (yellow card) 57', (goal) 79'; Kohr (yellow card) 60'; Ajorque 65'; Barreiro 73'	Report	Mané 29'	Stadium: Mewa Arena; Attendance: 33,305; Referee: Felix Zwayer

30 April 2023 30	Bayern Munich	2–0	Hertha BSC	Munich
15:30 CEST (UTC+2)	Goretzka (yellow card) 25'; Cancelo (yellow card) 67'; Gnabry 69'; Coman 79'	Report		Stadium: Allianz Arena; Attendance: 75,000; Referee: Patrick Ittrich

6 May 2023 31	Werder Bremen	1–2	Bayern Munich	Bremen
18:30 CEST (UTC+2)	Pieper (yellow card) 20'; Friedl (yellow card) 31'; Schmidt 87'	Report	Cancelo (yellow card) 15'; Gnabry 62'; Sané 72'	Stadium: Wohninvest Weserstadion; Attendance: 42,100; Referee: Christian Dingert

13 May 2023 32	Bayern Munich	6–0	Schalke 04	Munich
15:30 CEST (UTC+2)	Müller 21'; Kimmich 29' (pen.); Gnabry 50', 65'; Tel 80'; Mazraoui 90+2'	Report	Krauß (yellow card) 20'; Brunner (yellow card) 28'; Bülter (yellow card) 36'	Stadium: Allianz Arena; Attendance: 75,000; Referee: Robert Schröder

20 May 2023 33	Bayern Munich	1–3	RB Leipzig	Munich
18:30 CEST (UTC+2)	Gnabry 25'; Pavard (yellow card) 72'	Report	Laimer 64'; Gvardiol (yellow card) 68'; Nkunku 76' (pen.); Szoboszlai 86' (pen.)	Stadium: Allianz Arena; Attendance: 75,000; Referee: Deniz Aytekin

27 May 2023 34	1. FC Köln	1–2	Bayern Munich	Cologne
15:30 CEST (UTC+2)	Schmitz (yellow card) 24'; Ljubičić 81' (pen.), (yellow card) 82'; Thielmann (yellow card) 90'	Report	Coman 8'; Musiala 89'	Stadium: RheinEnergieStadion; Attendance: 50,000; Referee: Sven Jablonski

=== DFB-Pokal ===
31 August 2022 First round	Viktoria Köln	0–5	Bayern Munich	Cologne (Note: The Viktoria Köln v Bayern Munich match took place at the RheinEnergieStadion instead of Viktoria Köln's home stadium.)
20:46 CEST (UTC+2)		Report	Gravenberch 35'; Tel 45+1'; Mané 53'; Musiala 67'; Goretzka 82'	Stadium: RheinEnergieStadion; Attendance: 50,000; Referee: Matthias Jöllenbeck

19 October 2022 Second round	FC Augsburg	2–5	Bayern Munich	Augsburg
20:45 CEST (UTC+2)	Valentin 9', (yellow card) 78'; Upamecano 65' (o.g.); Gouweleeuw (yellow card) 79'	Report	Choupo-Moting 27', 59'; Kimmich 53'; Musiala 74'; Davies 90+1'	Stadium: WWK Arena; Attendance: 30,660; Referee: Bastian Dankert

1 February 2023 Round of 16	Mainz 05	0–4	Bayern Munich	Mainz
20:45 CET (UTC+1)	Widmer (yellow card) 24'; Hack (yellow card) 49' (yellow-red card) 86'	Report	Choupo-Moting 17'; Musiala 30'; Müller (yellow card) 38'; Sané 44'; Davies 83'	Stadium: Mewa Arena; Attendance: 33,305; Referee: Deniz Aytekin

4 April 2023 Quarter-finals	Bayern Munich	1–2	SC Freiburg	Munich
20:45 CEST (UTC+2)	Upamecano 19', (yellow card) 83'; Mané (yellow card) 90+2'; Musiala (yellow card) 90+3'; Pavard (yellow card) 90+3'	Report	Höfler 27'; Gregoritsch (yellow card) 36'; Sildillia (yellow card) 61'; Höler 90+5' (pen.)	Stadium: Allianz Arena; Attendance: 75,000; Referee: Harm Osmers

=== DFL-Supercup ===
30 July 2022 Final	RB Leipzig	3–5	Bayern Munich	Leipzig
20:30 CEST (UTC+2)	Simakan (yellow card) 36'; Halstenberg 59'; Nkunku 77' (pen.); Olmo 89'; Klostermann (yellow card) 90+2'	Report	Musiala 14'; Mané 31'; Pavard 45'; Kimmich (yellow card) 64'; Gnabry 66'; Hernandez (yellow card) 73'; Sané (yellow card) 87', (goal) 90+8'; Neuer (yellow card) 90+7'	Stadium: Red Bull Arena; Attendance: 47,069; Referee: Robert Schröder

=== UEFA Champions League ===
==== Group stage ====
The group stage draw was held on 25 August 2022.

Pos	Team	Pld	W	D	L	GF	GA	GD	Pts	Qualification	BAY	INT	BAR	PLZ
1	(Germany) Bayern Munich	6	6	0	0	18	2	+16	18	Advance to knockout phase	—	2–0	2–0	5–0
2	(Italy) Inter Milan	6	3	1	2	10	7	+3	10	Advance to knockout phase	0–2	—	1–0	4–0
3	(Spain) Barcelona	6	2	1	3	12	12	0	7	Transfer to Europa League	0–3	3–3	—	5–1
4	(Czech Republic) Viktoria Plzeň	6	0	0	6	5	24	−19	0		2–4	0–2	2–4	—

Source: UEFA
Rules for classification: Group stage tiebreakers

7 September 2022 1	Internazionale (Italy)	0–2	(Germany) Bayern Munich	Milan, Italy
21:00 CEST (UTC+2)	Dimarco (yellow card) 90'	Report	Sané 25'; De Ligt (yellow card) 41'; D'Ambrosio 66' (o.g.)	Stadium: San Siro; Attendance: 58,951; Referee: Clément Turpin (France)

13 September 2022 2	Bayern Munich (Germany)	2–0	(Spain) Barcelona	Munich, Germany
21:00 CEST (UTC+2)	Sabitzer (yellow card) 19'; Hernandez 50'; Sané 54'; Kimmich (yellow card) 74'	Report	Busquets (yellow card) 48'	Stadium: Allianz Arena; Attendance: 75,000; Referee: Danny Makkelie (Netherlands)

4 October 2022 3	Bayern Munich (Germany)	5–0	(Czech Republic) Viktoria Plzeň	Munich, Germany
18:45 CEST (UTC+2)	Sané 7', 50'; Gnabry 13'; Mané 21'; Choupo-Moting 59'	Report	Chory (yellow card) 29'	Stadium: Allianz Arena; Attendance: 75,000; Referee: Nikola Dabanović (Montenegro)

12 October 2022 4	Viktoria Plzeň (Czech Republic)	2–4	(Germany) Bayern Munich	Plzeň, Czech Republic
21:00 CEST (UTC+2)	Vlkanova 62'; Kliment 75'; Mosquera (yellow card) 78'	Report	Mané 10'; Müller 14'; Goretzka 25', 35'; Mazraoui (yellow card) 64'; Sabitzer (yellow card) 90'	Stadium: Doosan Arena; Attendance: 11,326; Referee: Bartosz Frankowski (Poland)

26 October 2022 5	Barcelona (Spain)	0–3	(Germany) Bayern Munich	Barcelona, Spain
21:00 CEST (UTC+2)	Busquets (yellow card) 41'	Report	Mané 10'; Mazraoui (yellow card) 16'; Goretzka (yellow card) 23'; Choupo-Moting 31'; Upamecano (yellow card) 35'; Pavard 90+5'	Stadium: Camp Nou; Attendance: 84,016; Referee: Anthony Taylor (England)

1 November 2022 6	Bayern Munich (Germany)	2–0	(Italy) Internazionale	Munich, Germany
21:00 CET (UTC+1)	Pavard 32'; Sabitzer (yellow card) 38'; Kimmich (yellow card) 48'; Choupo-Moting 72'; Stanišić (yellow card) 88'	Report	Gosens (yellow card) 40'; Carboni (yellow card) 90'	Stadium: Allianz Arena; Attendance: 75,000; Referee: Ivan Kružliak (Slovakia)

==== Knockout phase ====
===== Round of 16 =====
The draw for the round of 16 was held on 7 November 2022.

14 February 2023 First leg	Paris Saint-Germain (France)	0–1	(Germany) Bayern Munich	Paris, France
21:00 CET (UTC+1)	Kimpembe (yellow card) 70'; Neymar (yellow card) 87'	Report	Pavard (yellow card) 26' (yellow-red card) 90+2'; Coman 53'	Stadium: Parc des Princes; Attendance: 46,435; Referee: Michael Oliver (England)

8 March 2023 Second leg	Bayern Munich (Germany)	2–0 (3–0 agg.)	(France) Paris Saint-Germain	Munich, Germany
21:00 CET (UTC+1)	Choupo-Moting 61'; Gnabry 89'	Report	Hakimi (yellow card) 90+5'	Stadium: Allianz Arena; Attendance: 75,000; Referee: Daniele Orsato (Italy)

===== Quarter-finals =====
The draw for the quarter-finals was held on 17 March 2023.

11 April 2023 First leg	Manchester City (England)	3–0	(Germany) Bayern Munich	Manchester, England
21:00 CEST (UTC+2)	Rodri 27'; Silva (yellow card) 48', (goal) 70'; Haaland 76'	Report	Davies (yellow card) 49'; Pavard (yellow card) 88'	Stadium: City of Manchester Stadium; Attendance: 52,257; Referee: Jesús Gil Manzano (Spain)

19 April 2023 Second leg	Bayern Munich (Germany)	1–1 (1–4 agg.)	(England) Manchester City	Munich, Germany
21:00 CEST (UTC+2)	Cancelo (yellow card) 11'; Upamecano (yellow card) 35'; Kimmich (yellow card) 45+2', (goal) 83' (pen.); Pavard (yellow card) 60'; Stanišić (yellow card) 88'	Report	Haaland (penalty missed) 38', 57'; Ederson (yellow card) 44'; Gündoğan (yellow card) 45+2'; Aké (yellow card) 54'; Laporte (yellow card) 86'	Stadium: Allianz Arena; Attendance: 75,000; Referee: Clément Turpin (France)

== Statistics ==
=== Appearances and goals ===
No.	Pos	Nat	Player	Total		Bundesliga		DFB-Pokal		DFL-Supercup		Champions League	
No.	Pos	Nat	Player	Apps	Goals	Apps	Goals	Apps	Goals	Apps	Goals	Apps	Goals
Goalkeepers
1	GK	(Germany) GER	Manuel Neuer	16	0	12	0	0	0	1	0	3	0
26	GK	(Germany) GER	Sven Ulreich	8	0	3	0	2	0	0	0	3	0
27	GK	(Switzerland) SUI	Yann Sommer	25	0	19	0	2	0	0	0	4	0
35	GK	(Germany) GER	Johannes Schenk	0	0	0	0	0	0	0	0	0	0
Defenders
2	DF	(France) FRA	Dayot Upamecano	43	1	27+2	0	3	1	1	0	9+1	0
4	DF	(Netherlands) NED	Matthijs de Ligt	43	3	27+4	3	4	0	0+1	0	7	0
5	DF	(France) FRA	Benjamin Pavard	43	7	27+3	4	3	0	1	1	7+2	2
19	DF	(Canada) CAN	Alphonso Davies	38	3	24+2	1	1+1	2	1	0	6+3	0
20	DF	(Senegal) SEN	Bouna Sarr	1	0	0+1	0	0	0	0	0	0	0
21	DF	(France) FRA	Lucas Hernandez	11	1	6+1	0	1	0	1	0	2	1
22	DF	(Portugal) POR	João Cancelo	21	1	11+4	1	2	0	0	0	2+2	0
23	DF	(Netherlands) NED	Daley Blind	5	0	1+3	0	0+1	0	0	0	0	0
40	DF	(Morocco) MAR	Noussair Mazraoui	26	1	11+8	1	1	0	0+1	0	4+1	0
44	DF	(Croatia) CRO	Josip Stanišić	23	0	4+10	0	1	0	0	0	3+5	0
Midfielders
6	MF	(Germany) GER	Joshua Kimmich	47	7	32+1	5	4	1	1	0	9	1
8	MF	(Germany) GER	Leon Goretzka	40	6	22+5	3	2+2	1	0	0	7+2	2
14	MF	(Germany) GER	Paul Wanner	4	0	0+2	0	0	0	0	0	0+2	0
38	MF	(Netherlands) NED	Ryan Gravenberch	33	1	3+21	0	1+1	1	0+1	0	2+4	0
42	FW	(Germany) GER	Jamal Musiala	47	16	26+7	12	2+2	3	1	1	7+2	0
46	MF	(Germany) GER	Arijon Ibrahimović	1	0	0+1	0	0	0	0	0	0	0
Forwards
7	FW	(Germany) GER	Serge Gnabry	47	17	22+12	14	2+2	0	1	1	3+5	2
10	FW	(Germany) GER	Leroy Sané	44	14	20+12	8	2+1	1	0+1	1	7+1	4
11	FW	(France) FRA	Kingsley Coman	35	9	16+8	8	2+1	0	0+1	0	7	1
13	FW	(Cameroon) CMR	Eric Maxim Choupo-Moting	30	17	14+5	10	3+1	3	0	0	5+2	4
17	FW	(Senegal) SEN	Sadio Mané	38	12	18+7	7	2+1	1	1	1	6+3	3
25	FW	(Germany) GER	Thomas Müller	40	8	21+6	7	3+1	0	1	0	4+4	1
39	FW	(France) FRA	Mathys Tel	28	6	1+21	5	1	1	0	0	0+5	0
Players transferred out during the season
18	MF	(Austria) AUT	Marcel Sabitzer	24	1	7+8	1	0+2	0	1	0	3+3	0
23	DF	(France) FRA	Tanguy Nianzou	0	0	0	0	0	0	0	0	0	0
43	MF	(Germany) GER	Adrian Fein	0	0	0	0	0	0	0	0	0	0
28	FW	(Croatia) CRO	Gabriel Vidović	1	0	0+1	0	0	0	0	0	0	0
32	FW	(Netherlands) NED	Joshua Zirkzee	0	0	0	0	0	0	0	0	0	0

Source: Competitions

=== Goalscorers ===
Rank	No.	Pos.	Nat.	Player	Bundesliga	DFB-Pokal	DFL-Supercup	Champions League	Total
1	7	FW	(Germany)	Serge Gnabry	14	0	1	2	17
1	13	FW	(Cameroon)	Eric Maxim Choupo-Moting	10	3	0	4	17
3	42	MF	(Germany)	Jamal Musiala	12	3	1	0	16
4	10	FW	(Germany)	Leroy Sané	8	1	1	4	14
5	17	FW	(Senegal)	Sadio Mané	7	1	1	3	12
6	11	FW	(France)	Kingsley Coman	8	0	0	1	9
7	25	FW	(Germany)	Thomas Müller	7	0	0	1	8
8	5	DF	(France)	Benjamin Pavard	4	0	1	2	7
8	6	MF	(Germany)	Joshua Kimmich	5	1	0	1	7
10	8	MF	(Germany)	Leon Goretzka	3	1	0	2	6
10	39	FW	(France)	Mathys Tel	5	1	0	0	6
12	4	DF	(Netherlands)	Matthijs de Ligt	3	0	0	0	3
12	19	DF	(Canada)	Alphonso Davies	1	2	0	0	3
14	2	DF	(France)	Dayot Upamecano	0	1	0	0	1
14	18	MF	(Austria)	Marcel Sabitzer	1	0	0	0	1
14	21	DF	(France)	Lucas Hernandez	0	0	0	1	1
14	22	DF	(Portugal)	João Cancelo	1	0	0	0	1
14	38	MF	(Netherlands)	Ryan Gravenberch	0	1	0	0	1
14	40	DF	(Morocco)	Noussair Mazraoui	1	0	0	0	1
Own goals					2	0	0	1	3
Totals					92	15	5	22	134
