= 2023–24 FC Bayern Munich season =

125th season in existence of Bayern Munich

Bayern Munich
2023–24 season
- President: Herbert Hainer
- Head coach: Thomas Tuchel
- Stadium: Allianz Arena
- Bundesliga: 3rd
- DFB-Pokal: Second round
- DFL-Supercup: Runners-up
- UEFA Champions League: Semi-finals
- Top goalscorer: League: Harry Kane (36); All: Harry Kane (44)
- Biggest win: Bayern Munich 8–0 Darmstadt 98; 28 October 2023, Bundesliga
- Biggest defeat: Eintracht Frankfurt 5–1 Bayern Munich; 9 December 2023, Bundesliga
Home colours	Away colours	Third colours

The 2023–24 season was the 125th season in the history of Bayern Munich and their 59th consecutive season in the top flight of German football. In addition to the domestic league, they participated in this season's editions of the DFB-Pokal, DFL-Supercup and UEFA Champions League.

Bayern's streak of eleven consecutive Bundesliga titles came to an end after they were beaten to the crown by Bayer Leverkusen. Eliminations in the DFL-Supercup, DFB-Pokal and Champions League ensured the club's first trophyless season since the 2011–12 campaign.

Bayern drew an average home attendance of 75,000 in 17 home games in the 2023–24 league season.

== Players ==
=== Squad ===
As of 18 May 2024

Note: Flags indicate national team as defined under FIFA eligibility rules; some limited exceptions apply. Players may hold more than one non-FIFA nationality.

No.	Pos.	Nation	Player
1	GK	GER	Manuel Neuer (captain)
2	DF	FRA	Dayot Upamecano
3	DF	KOR	Kim Min-jae
4	DF	NED	Matthijs de Ligt
6	MF	GER	Joshua Kimmich (3rd captain)
7	FW	GER	Serge Gnabry
8	MF	GER	Leon Goretzka (4th captain)
9	FW	ENG	Harry Kane
10	FW	GER	Leroy Sané
11	FW	FRA	Kingsley Coman
13	FW	CMR	Eric Maxim Choupo-Moting
15	DF	ENG	Eric Dier (on loan from Tottenham Hotspur)
16	DF	GER	Luca Denk
17	FW	ESP	Bryan Zaragoza (on loan from Granada)
18	GK	ISR	Daniel Peretz
19	DF	CAN	Alphonso Davies
20	DF	SEN	Bouna Sarr

No.	Pos.	Nation	Player
22	DF	POR	Raphaël Guerreiro
23	DF	FRA	Sacha Boey
25	FW	GER	Thomas Müller (vice-captain)
26	GK	GER	Sven Ulreich
27	MF	AUT	Konrad Laimer
28	DF	GER	Tarek Buchmann
34	MF	CRO	Lovro Zvonarek
36	MF	GER	Noël Aséko Nkili
38	DF	GER	Max Scholze
39	FW	FRA	Mathys Tel
40	DF	MAR	Noussair Mazraoui
41	DF	SWE	Matteo Pérez Vinlöf
42	MF	GER	Jamal Musiala
43	GK	GER	Tom Ritzy Hülsmann
44	DF	MAR	Adam Aznou
45	MF	GER	Aleksandar Pavlović
46	MF	DEN	Jonathan Asp Jensen
48	GK	GER	Max Schmitt

== Transfers ==
=== In ===
No.	Pos.	Player	Transferred from	Fee	Date	Source
–	MF	(Germany) Davide Dell'Erba	(Germany) FC Augsburg U19	Free transfer (joined Bayern Munich II)	1 June 2023	
–	FW	(Kosovo) Dion Berisha	(Germany) FC Augsburg II	Free transfer (joined Bayern Munich II)	1 June 2023	
27	MF	(Austria) Konrad Laimer	(Germany) RB Leipzig	Free transfer	8 June 2023	
36	GK	(Germany) Alexander Nübel	(France) Monaco	Loan return	30 June 2023	
–	FW	(Germany) Marvin Çuni	(Germany) 1. FC Saarbrücken	Loan return	30 June 2023	
–	MF	(Germany) Torben Rhein	Austria Lustenau	Loan return	30 June 2023	
37	MF	(United States) Malik Tillman	(Scotland) Rangers	Loan return	30 June 2023	
–	MF	(New Zealand) Sarpreet Singh	(Germany) Jahn Regensburg	Loan return	30 June 2023	
–	MF	(Nigeria) Daniel Francis	Austria Klagenfurt	Loan return	30 June 2023	
32	MF	(Croatia) Gabriel Vidović	(Netherlands) Vitesse	Loan return	30 June 2023	
–	DF	(Germany) Bright Arrey-Mbi	(Germany) Hannover 96	Loan return	30 June 2023	
–	MF	(Austria) Emilian Metu	Austria Klagenfurt	Loan return	30 June 2023	
–	DF	(Bosnia and Herzegovina) Nick Salihamidžić	(Italy) Cosenza	Loan return	30 June 2023	
18	MF	(Austria) Marcel Sabitzer	(England) Manchester United	Loan return	30 June 2023	
–	FW	(Germany) Lenn Jastremski	(Austria) Grazer AK	Loan return	30 June 2023	
–	GK	(China) Liu Shaoziyang	(Austria) Grazer AK	Loan return	30 June 2023	
–	DF	(Germany) David Herold	(Austria) Rheindorf Altach	Loan return	30 June 2023	
22	DF	(Portugal) Raphaël Guerreiro	(Germany) Borussia Dortmund	Free transfer	23 June 2023	
–	GK	(Australia) Anthony Pavlešić	(Australia) CCM Academy	Undisclosed (joined Bayern Munich U19)	1 July 2023	
–	DF	(Germany) Steve Breitkreuz	(Germany) Jahn Regensburg	Free transfer (joined Bayern Munich II)	4 July 2023	
3	DF	(South Korea) Kim Min-jae	(Italy) Napoli	€50,000,000	18 July 2023	
9	FW	(England) Harry Kane	(England) Tottenham Hotspur	€100,000,000	12 August 2023	
18	GK	(Israel) Daniel Peretz	(Israel) Maccabi Tel Aviv	€5,000,000	25 August 2023	
–	MF	(Australia) Nestory Irankunda	(Australia) Adelaide United	€3,400,000 (joined in July 2024)	14 November 2023	
17	FW	(Spain) Bryan Zaragoza	(Spain) Granada	€13,000,000 + €4,000,000 (initially set to join in July 2024, he eventually joined early in February 2024 on loan)	6 December 2023	
–	FW	(Germany) Lenn Jastremski	(Germany) SSV Ulm	Loan return	2 January 2024	
–	MF	(Scotland) Barry Hepburn	(Scotland) Queen's Park	Loan return	10 January 2024	
15	DF	(England) Eric Dier	(England) Tottenham Hotspur	Loan	11 January 2024	
23	DF	(France) Sacha Boey	(Turkey) Galatasaray	€30,000,000	28 January 2024	
–	FW	(Sweden) Jonah Kusi-Asare	(Sweden) AIK	€4,500,000 (joined Bayern Munich U19)	1 February 2024	
–	FW	(Serbia) Marko Popović	—N/a	Free agent (joined Bayern Munich II)	1 February 2024	

Total spending: ▼€208,900,000

=== Out ===
No.	Pos.	Player	Transferred to	Fee	Date	Source
–	FW	(Armenia) Grant-Leon Ranos	(Germany) Borussia Mönchengladbach	Free transfer	24 May 2023	
–	DF	(Germany) Justin Janitzek	(Switzerland) St. Gallen	Loan	19 June 2023	
–	MF	(The Gambia) Mamin Sanyang	(Germany) Hannover 96 II	Free transfer	23 June 2023	
–	MF	(Scotland) Barry Hepburn	(Scotland) Queen's Park	Loan	23 June 2023	
–	GK	(Germany) Jakob Mayer	(Germany) FC 08 Homburg	Loan	26 June 2023	
–	FW	(Germany) Lenn Jastremski	(Germany) SSV Ulm	Loan	26 June 2023	
–	DF	(Scotland) Liam Morrison	(England) Wigan Athletic	Loan	27 June 2023	
–	DF	(Germany) David Herold	(Germany) Karlsruher SC	Loan	29 June 2023	
22	DF	(Portugal) João Cancelo	(England) Manchester City	Loan return	1 July 2023	
43	DF	(Germany) Bright Arrey-Mbi	(Germany) Hannover 96	Free transfer	1 July 2023	
–	MF	(Kosovo) Behar Neziri	(Switzerland) St. Gallen II	Free transfer	1 July 2023	
–	DF	(Austria) Matteo Schablas	(Austria) FC Liefering	Free transfer	1 July 2023	
–	FW	(Croatia) Luka Klanac	(Germany) FC Ingolstadt 04	Free transfer	1 July 2023	
–	GK	(Germany) Jannis Bärtl	(Germany) Karlsruher SC	Loan	2 July 2023	
–	MF	(Germany) Torben Rhein	Austria Lustenau	Loan	3 July 2023	
–	GK	(China) Liu Shaoziyang	(Austria) SV Ried	Loan	4 July 2023	
–	DF	(Germany) Jonas Kehl	(Germany) SpVgg Bayreuth	Free transfer	4 July 2023	
–	MF	(New Zealand) Sarpreet Singh	(Germany) Hansa Rostock	Undisclosed	5 July 2023	
–	FW	(Germany) Marvin Çuni	(Italy) Frosinone	Free transfer	6 July 2023	
–	MF	(South Korea) Lee Hyun-ju	(Germany) SV Wehen Wiesbaden	Loan	7 July 2023	
23	DF	(Netherlands) Daley Blind	(Spain) Girona	Free transfer	8 July 2023	
21	DF	(France) Lucas Hernandez	(France) Paris Saint-Germain	€45,000,000	10 July 2023	
–	MF	(Austria) Emilian Metu	(Austria) SV Horn	Undisclosed	19 July 2023	
18	MF	(Austria) Marcel Sabitzer	(Germany) Borussia Dortmund	€19,000,000	24 July 2023	
–	MF	(Nigeria) Daniel Francis	(Austria) FC Wacker Innsbruck	Undisclosed	25 July 2023	
36	GK	(Germany) Alexander Nübel	(Germany) VfB Stuttgart	Loan (€1,000,000)	25 July 2023	
35	GK	(Germany) Johannes Schenk	(Germany) Preußen Münster	Loan	26 July 2023	
–	DF	(Germany) Roman Reinelt	(Germany) FC Augsburg II	Free transfer	27 July 2023	
17	FW	(Senegal) Sadio Mané	(Saudi Arabia) Al Nassr	€30,000,000	1 August 2023	
–	FW	(Germany) Yusuf Kabadayı	(Germany) Schalke 04	Loan	3 August 2023	
27	GK	(Switzerland) Yann Sommer	(Italy) Inter Milan	€6,750,000	7 August 2023	
–	MF	(Georgia (country)) Luka Parkadze	(Austria) Admira Wacker	Loan	10 August 2023	
37	MF	(United States) Malik Tillman	(Netherlands) PSV Eindhoven	Loan (€1,000,000)	10 August 2023	
44	DF	(Croatia) Josip Stanišić	(Germany) Bayer Leverkusen	Loan	21 August 2023	
–	MF	(Kosovo) Benjamin Dibrani	(Austria) SW Bregenz	Loan	30 August 2023	
32	MF	(Croatia) Gabriel Vidović	(Croatia) Dinamo Zagreb	Loan (€500,000)	30 August 2023	
5	DF	(France) Benjamin Pavard	(Italy) Inter Milan	€30,000,000	30 August 2023	
14	MF	(Germany) Paul Wanner	(Germany) SV Elversberg	Loan	1 September 2023	
46	MF	(Germany) Arijon Ibrahimović	(Italy) Frosinone	Loan	1 September 2023	
–	DF	(Germany) Angelo Brückner	(Austria) TSV Hartberg	Loan	1 September 2023	
–	DF	(Croatia) Antonio Tikvić	(Italy) Udinese	€650,000	1 September 2023	
38	MF	(Netherlands) Ryan Gravenberch	(England) Liverpool	€40,000,000	1 September 2023	
–	FW	(Benin) Désiré Segbé Azankpo	(Belgium) Seraing	Undisclosed	6 September 2023	
–	DF	(Turkey) Kaan Bengi	(Turkey) Bodrum	Free transfer	7 September 2023	
–	MF	(Turkey) Eyüp Aydın	(Turkey) Galatasaray	€250,000	14 September 2023	
–	FW	(Germany) Lenn Jastremski	(Austria) Grazer AK	Loan	13 January 2024	
–	MF	(Scotland) Barry Hepburn	(Austria) DSV Leoben	Loan	18 January 2024	
–	FW	(Germany) Lucas Copado	(Austria) LASK	Undisclosed	22 January 2024	
–	GK	(Germany) Lukas Schneller	(Germany) SC Freiburg II	Loan	23 January 2024	
–	DF	(Germany) Fabio Dill	(Germany) FC Ingolstadt 04	Free transfer	24 January 2024	
–	DF	(Germany) Leon Fust	(Austria) SKU Amstetten	Loan	27 January 2024	
–	DF	(Bosnia and Herzegovina) Nick Salihamidžić	—N/a	Free transfer	27 January 2024	
46	MF	(Japan) Taichi Fukui	(Portugal) Portimonense	Loan	31 January 2024	
–	FW	(Serbia) Marko Popović	(Austria) FC Wacker Innsbruck	Loan	2 February 2024	
41	DF	(Germany) Frans Krätzig	Austria Wien	Loan	6 February 2024	

Total income: ▲€174,150,000

== Season review ==
=== August ===
Bayern Munich's season started on 12 August 2023 when they took on RB Leipzig in the DFL-Supercup. RB Leipzig won the Super Cup with three goals from Dani Olmo. Harry Kane made his debut for Bayern Munich. The opening match of their Bundesliga campaign happened against Werder Bremen. The match took place on 18 August 2023 at the Weserstadion in Bremen. Bayern Munich won the match 4–0 with two goals from Leroy Sané, and a goal each from Harry Kane and Mathys Tel. This was Harry Kane's first goal for Bayern Munich. Bayern Munich finished August with a Bundesliga match against FC Augsburg. Bayern Munich won the match 3–1. Bayern Munich got an own goal from Felix Uduokhai and two goals from Harry Kane, including one from a penalty kick. Bayern Munich finished August in second place. The 2023–24 UEFA Champions League group stage draw took place on 31 August 2023. Bayern Munich were drawn against Manchester United, F.C. Copenhagen, and Galatasaray.

=== September ===
Bayern Munich started September with a match against Borussia Mönchengladbach. The match took place on 2 September 2023 at Borussia-Park in Mönchengladbach. Bayern Munich won 2–1. Leroy Sané and Mathys Tel scored for Bayern Munich. Ko Itakura scored for Borussia Mönchengladbach. Bayern Munich faced Bayer Leverkusen 13 days later at the Allianz Arena in Munich. The match finished in a 2–2 draw. Harry Kane and Leon Goretzka scored for Bayern Munich. Bayer Leverkusen's goalscorers were Álex Grimaldo and Exequiel Palacios, who scored from the penalty kick. On 20 September 2023, Bayern Munich started their UEFA Champions League campaign. The match was against Manchester United at the Allianz Arena in Munich. Bayern Munich won the match 4–3. Leroy Sané, Serge Gnabry, Harry Kane, and Mathys Tel scored for Bayern Munich. Manchester United got two goals from Casemiro and a goal from Rasmus Højlund. Then on the following Saturday, Bayern Munich defeated VfL Bochum 7–0 with three goals from Harry Kane and a goal each from Eric Maxim Choupo-Moting, Matthijs de Ligt, Leroy Sané, and Mathys Tel. Bayern Munich finished off September with a 4–0 game over Preußen Münster and a 2–2 draw against RB Leipzig. Serge Gnabry injured his forearm against Preußen Münster. Bayern Munich finished September in third place.

=== October ===
Bayern started October with a 2–1 match over FC Copenhagen in the UEFA Champions League which took place at Parken Stadium in Copenhagen, Denmark. Jamal Musiala and Mathys Tel scored for Bayern Munich and Lukas Lerager scored for FC Copenhagen. Bayern Munich remained in first place in Group A. Bayern Munich faced SC Freiburg the following Sunday, which Bayern Munich won 3–0 with two goals from Kingsley Coman and a goal from Leroy Sané.

== Pre-season and friendlies ==
Win Draw Loss Fixtures

18 July 2023 Friendly	Rottach-Egern	0–27	Bayern Munich	Rottach-Egern, Germany
18:30 CEST (UTC+2)		Report	Musiala 3', 13', 36', 42', 44'; Gnabry 4', 11', 43'; Davies 8'; Laimer 19'; Tel 22', 25', 29', 34', 41'; Mazraoui 27'; Upamecano 30'; Sané 35'; Sabitzer 50', 63', 65', 70', 72'; Guerreiro 75'; Gravenberch 82'; Coman 85'; Mané 90'	Stadium: Stadion am Birkenmoos; Attendance: 2,500; Referee: Maximilian Hafeneder (Germany)

26 July 2023 Audi Football Summit	Bayern Munich	1–2	Manchester City	Tokyo, Japan
19:30 JST (UTC+9); 12:30 CEST (UTC+2)	Tel 81'	Report	McAtee 21'; Laporte 86'	Stadium: Japan National Stadium; Attendance: 65,049; Referee: Jumpei Iida (Japan)

29 July 2023 Audi Football Summit	Kawasaki Frontale	0–1	Bayern Munich	Tokyo, Japan
19:00 JST (UTC+9); 12:00 CEST (UTC+2)		Report	Laimer (yellow card) 45+2'; Stanišić 57'	Stadium: Japan National Stadium; Attendance: 45,289; Referee: Futoshi Nakamura (Japan)

2 August 2023 Singapore Trophy	Liverpool	3–4	Bayern Munich	Kallang, Singapore
19:30 SST (UTC+8); 13:30 CEST (UTC+2)	Gakpo 2', (yellow card) 56'; Van Dijk 28'; Alexander-Arnold (yellow card) 58'; Díaz 66'	Report	Gnabry 33'; Sané 42'; Stanišić 80'; Krätzig 90+1'	Stadium: Singapore National Stadium; Attendance: 49,983; Referee: Ahmad A'Qashah (Singapore)

7 August 2023 Friendly	Bayern Munich	4–2	Monaco	Unterhaching, Germany
17:00 CEST (UTC+2)	Laimer 31'; Musiala 42'; Gnabry 45+2' (pen.); Sané 69'	Report	Minamino 29'; Camara (yellow card) 58'; Ben Yedder 64' (pen.); Magassa (yellow card) 90'	Stadium: Sportpark Unterhaching; Attendance: 10,872; Referee: Robert Hartmann (Germany)

19 August 2023 Dream Match	Weinbeisser Kaltern	1–6	Bayern Munich	Kaltern, South Tyrol
15:00 CEST (UTC+2)	Ritsch 44'	Report	Pavard 36'; Müller 45+1', 55'; Tel 58'; Gravenberch 63'; Musiala 86'	Stadium: Sportanlage St. Anton; Attendance: 6,400

6 January 2024 Friendly	Basel	1–1	Bayern Munich	Basel, Switzerland
15:30 CET (UTC+1)	Avdullahu (yellow card) 45'; Gauto 59'	Report	Aséko 70'	Stadium: St. Jakob-Park; Attendance: 36,000; Referee: Fedayi San (Switzerland)

== Competitions ==
=== Overall record ===
Competition	First match	Last match	Starting round	Final position	Record							
Competition	First match	Last match	Starting round	Final position	Pld	W	D	L	GF	GA	GD	Win %
Bundesliga	18 August 2023	18 May 2024	Matchday 1	3rd	34	23	3	8	94	45	+49	67.65
DFB-Pokal	26 September 2023	1 November 2023	First round	Second round	2	1	0	1	5	2	+3	50.00
DFL-Supercup	12 August 2023		Final	Runners-up	1	0	0	1	0	3	−3	0.00
UEFA Champions League	20 September 2023	8 May 2024	Group stage	Semi-finals	12	7	3	2	21	13	+8	58.33
Total					49	31	6	12	120	63	+57	63.27

Source: Soccerway

=== Bundesliga ===
==== League table ====
Pos	Team	Pld	W	D	L	GF	GA	GD	Pts	Qualification or relegation
1	Bayer Leverkusen (C)	34	28	6	0	89	24	+65	90	Qualification for the Champions League league phase (Note: The Bundesliga gained an additional Champions League place as a result of Germany finishing as one of the two associations with the highest UEFA coefficient points in 2023–24.)
2	VfB Stuttgart	34	23	4	7	78	39	+39	73	Qualification for the Champions League league phase
3	Bayern Munich	34	23	3	8	94	45	+49	72	Qualification for the Champions League league phase
4	RB Leipzig	34	19	8	7	77	39	+38	65	Qualification for the Champions League league phase
5	Borussia Dortmund	34	18	9	7	68	43	+25	63	Qualification for the Champions League league phase

Source: DFB
Rules for classification: 1) Points; 2) Goal difference; 3) Goals scored; 4) Head-to-head results; 5) Head-to-head away goals scored; 6) Away goals scored; 7) Play-off.
(C) Champions

==== Results summary ====
Overall								Home						Away					
Pld	W	D	L	GF	GA	GD	Pts	W	D	L	GF	GA	GD	W	D	L	GF	GA	GD
34	23	3	8	94	45	+49	72	14	1	2	53	12	+41	9	2	6	41	33	+8

Source: DFB

==== Results by round ====
Round	1	2	3	4	5	6	7	8	9	10	11	12	13	14	15	16	17	18	19	20	21	22	23	24	25	26	27	28	29	30	31	32	33	34
Ground	A	H	A	H	H	A	H	A	H	A	H	A	H	A	H	A	H	H	A	H	A	A	H	A	H	A	H	A	H	A	H	A	H	A
Result	W	W	W	D	W	D	W	W	W	W	W	W	W	L	W	W	W	L	W	W	L	L	W	D	W	W	L	L	W	W	W	L	W	L
Position	2	2	2	2	1	3	3	3	2	2	2	2	2	2	2	2	2	2	2	2	2	2	2	2	2	2	2	2	2	2	2	2	2	3

Source: DFB
A = Away; H = Home; W = Win; D = Draw; L = Loss

==== Matches ====
The league fixtures were announced on 30 June 2023.

18 August 2023 1	Werder Bremen	0–4	Bayern Munich	Bremen
20:30 CEST (UTC+2)	Ducksch (yellow card) 20'; Lynen (yellow card) 56'	Report	Sané 4', 90'; Kim (yellow card) 55'; Kane 75'; Tel 90+4'	Stadium: Wohninvest Weserstadion; Attendance: 42,100; Referee: Felix Zwayer

27 August 2023 2	Bayern Munich	3–1	FC Augsburg	Munich
17:30 CEST (UTC+2)	Uduokhai 32' (o.g.); Kane 40' (pen.), 69'; Gravenberch (yellow card) 83'	Report	Rexhbeçaj (yellow card) 56'; Cardona (yellow card) 79'; Beljo 86'	Stadium: Allianz Arena; Attendance: 75,000; Referee: Daniel Siebert

2 September 2023 3	Borussia Mönchengladbach	1–2	Bayern Munich	Mönchengladbach
18:30 CEST (UTC+2)	Itakura 30'	Report	Mazraoui (yellow card) 22'; Sané 58'; Coman (yellow card) 60'; Tel 87'	Stadium: Borussia-Park; Attendance: 54,042; Referee: Deniz Aytekin

15 September 2023 4	Bayern Munich	2–2	Bayer Leverkusen	Munich
20:30 CEST (UTC+2)	Kane 7'; Goretzka 86'	Report	Grimaldo 24'; Hofmann (yellow card) 34'; Wirtz (yellow card) 47'; Tapsoba (yellow card) 69'; Palacios 90+4' (pen.)	Stadium: Allianz Arena; Attendance: 75,000; Referee: Daniel Schlager

23 September 2023 5	Bayern Munich	7–0	VfL Bochum	Munich
15:30 CEST (UTC+2)	Choupo-Moting 4'; Kane 13', 54' (pen.), 88'; De Ligt 29'; Sané 38'; Tel 81'	Report	Losilla (yellow card) 26'	Stadium: Allianz Arena; Attendance: 75,000; Referee: Robert Hartmann

30 September 2023 6	RB Leipzig	2–2	Bayern Munich	Leipzig
18:30 CEST (UTC+2)	Openda 20'; Lukeba 26', (yellow card) 65'; Simakan (yellow card) 54'	Report	Kane (yellow card) 37', (goal) 57' (pen.); Ulreich (yellow card) 44'; Upamecano (yellow card) 51'; Sané 70'; Musiala (yellow card) 72'; Tel (yellow card) 81'	Stadium: Red Bull Arena; Attendance: 47,069; Referee: Marco Fritz

8 October 2023 7	Bayern Munich	3–0	SC Freiburg	Munich
17:30 CEST (UTC+2)	Coman 12', 85'; Mazraoui (yellow card) 17'; Sané 25'	Report		Stadium: Allianz Arena; Attendance: 75,000; Referee: Robert Schröder

21 October 2023 8	Mainz 05	1–3	Bayern Munich	Mainz
18:30 CEST (UTC+2)	Caci 43'; Ajorque (yellow card) 45+2'; Kohr (yellow card) 49'; Bell (yellow card) 65'	Report	Coman 11'; Kane 16'; De Ligt (yellow card) 27'; Goretzka 59'; Laimer (yellow card) 90+1'	Stadium: Mewa Arena; Attendance: 33,305; Referee: Sascha Stegemann

28 October 2023 9	Bayern Munich	8–0	Darmstadt 98	Munich
15:30 CEST (UTC+2)	Kimmich (red card) 4'; De Ligt (yellow card) 38'; Kane 51', 69', 88'; Sané 56', 64'; Musiala 60', 76'; Müller 71'	Report	Gjasula (red card) 21'; Maglica (red card) 41'; Bader (yellow card) 49'; Nürnberger (yellow card) 69'	Stadium: Allianz Arena; Attendance: 75,000; Referee: Martin Petersen

4 November 2023 10	Borussia Dortmund	0–4	Bayern Munich	Dortmund
18:30 CET (UTC+1)	Hummels (yellow card) 61'; Ryerson (yellow card) 74'; Sabitzer (yellow card) 76'	Report	Upamecano 4'; Kane 9', 72', 90+3'; Sané (yellow card) 22'; Laimer (yellow card) 85'	Stadium: Signal Iduna Park; Attendance: 81,365; Referee: Deniz Aytekin

11 November 2023 11	Bayern Munich	4–2	1. FC Heidenheim	Munich
15:30 CET (UTC+1)	Mazraoui (yellow card) 3'; Kane 14', 44'; Guerreiro 72'; Choupo-Moting 85'	Report	Kleindienst 67'; Beste 70'	Stadium: Allianz Arena; Attendance: 75,000; Referee: Harm Osmers

25 November 2023 12	1. FC Köln	0–1	Bayern Munich	Cologne
20:30 CET (UTC+1)		Report	Kane 20'; Choupo-Moting (yellow card) 52'	Stadium: RheinEnergieStadion; Attendance: 50,000; Referee: Marco Fritz

9 December 2023 14	Eintracht Frankfurt	5–1	Bayern Munich	Frankfurt
15:30 CET (UTC+1)	Marmoush 12', (yellow card) 67'; Dina Ebimbe 31', 50'; Larsson 36'; Knauff 60'	Report	Kim (yellow card) 24'; Kimmich 44'; Sané (yellow card) 71'	Stadium: Deutsche Bank Park; Attendance: 58,000; Referee: Felix Zwayer

17 December 2023 15	Bayern Munich	3–0	VfB Stuttgart	Munich
19:30 CET (UTC+1)	Kane 2', 55'; Kim 63'	Report	Mittelstädt (yellow card) 31'; Karazor (yellow card) 69'; Leweling (yellow card) 82'	Stadium: Allianz Arena; Attendance: 75,000; Referee: Tobias Stieler

20 December 2023 16	VfL Wolfsburg	1–2	Bayern Munich	Wolfsburg
20:30 CET (UTC+1)	Zesiger (yellow card) 11'; Arnold 45+1'; Majer (yellow card) 46'; Baku (yellow card) 59'; Tomás (yellow card) 90+1'	Report	Pavlović (yellow card) 20'; Musiala 33'; Kane 43'; Guerreiro (yellow card) 90+1'	Stadium: Volkswagen Arena; Attendance: 28,917; Referee: Sascha Stegemann

12 January 2024 17	Bayern Munich	3–0	TSG Hoffenheim	Munich
20:30 CET (UTC+1)	Musiala 18', 70'; Pavlović (yellow card) 83'; Kane 90'	Report	Stach (yellow card) 16'; Prömel (yellow card) 42' (yellow-red card) 74'	Stadium: Allianz Arena; Attendance: 75,000; Referee: Benjamin Brand

21 January 2024 18	Bayern Munich	0–1	Werder Bremen	Munich
15:30 CET (UTC+1)	Kimmich (yellow card) 17'; De Ligt (yellow card) 74'	Report	Weiser 59'; Schmid (yellow card) 70'	Stadium: Allianz Arena; Attendance: 75,000; Referee: Marco Fritz

24 January 2024 13	Bayern Munich	1–0	Union Berlin	Munich
20:30 CET (UTC+1)	Guerreiro 46'; Sané (yellow card) 74'; Kane (yellow card) 90+5'	Report	Behrens (yellow card) 48'; Vogt (yellow card) 90+5'; Haberer (yellow card) 90+5'; Leite (yellow card) 90+6'	Stadium: Allianz Arena; Attendance: 75,000; Referee: Frank Willenborg
Note: The match was originally scheduled for 2 December 2023, but was postponed due to heavy snowfall.

27 January 2024 19	FC Augsburg	2–3	Bayern Munich	Augsburg
15:30 CET (UTC+1)	Mbabu (yellow card) 19'; Demirović 52', 90+4' (pen.); Iago (yellow card) 69'; Michel (penalty missed) 88'	Report	De Ligt (yellow card) 6'; Pavlović 23', (yellow card) 67'; Davies 45+5'; Kane 58'; Sané (yellow card) 80'; Guerreiro (yellow card) 90+6'; Goretzka (yellow card) 90+7'; Neuer (yellow card) 90+8'	Stadium: WWK Arena; Attendance: 30,660; Referee: Christian Dingert

3 February 2024 20	Bayern Munich	3–1	Borussia Mönchengladbach	Munich
15:30 CET (UTC+1)	Pavlović 45'; Kane 70'; De Ligt 86'	Report	Neuhaus (yellow card) 30'; Elvedi 35'	Stadium: Allianz Arena; Attendance: 75,000; Referee: Tobias Stieler

10 February 2024 21	Bayer Leverkusen	3–0	Bayern Munich	Leverkusen
18:30 CET (UTC+1)	Stanišić 18'; Grimaldo 50'; Tapsoba (yellow card) 64'; Adli (yellow card) 77'; Hradecky (yellow card) 83'; Frimpong 90+5'	Report	Boey (yellow card) 36'; Goretzka (yellow card) 62'	Stadium: BayArena; Attendance: 30,210; Referee: Felix Zwayer

18 February 2024 22	VfL Bochum	3–2	Bayern Munich	Bochum
17:30 CET (UTC+1)	Asano 38'; Schlotterbeck 44'; Bernardo (yellow card) 45'; Losilla (yellow card) 45+6'; Stöger 78' (pen.)	Report	Musiala 14'; Upamecano (yellow card) 39' (yellow-red card) 77'; Goretzka (yellow card) 50'; Kim (yellow card) 59'; Kane 87'	Stadium: Vonovia Ruhrstadion; Attendance: 26,000; Referee: Daniel Schlager

24 February 2024 23	Bayern Munich	2–1	RB Leipzig	Munich
18:30 CET (UTC+1)	Pavlović (yellow card) 38'; Kane 56', 90+1'; De Ligt (yellow card) 59'; Musiala (yellow card) 66'	Report	Orbán (yellow card) 41'; Schlager (yellow card) 67'; Šeško 70'; Simakan (yellow card) 78'	Stadium: Allianz Arena; Attendance: 75,000; Referee: Sascha Stegemann

1 March 2024 24	SC Freiburg	2–2	Bayern Munich	Freiburg
20:30 CET (UTC+1)	Günter 12'; Höler 87', (yellow card) 90+4'	Report	Tel 35', (yellow card) 73'; Musiala 75'; Pavlović (yellow card) 79'	Stadium: Europa-Park Stadion; Attendance: 34,700; Referee: Sven Jablonski

9 March 2024 25	Bayern Munich	8–1	Mainz 05	Munich
15:30 CET (UTC+1)	Laimer (yellow card) 5'; Kane 13', 45+7', 70'; Goretzka 20', 90+2'; Müller 47'; Musiala 61'; Gnabry 66'	Report	Amiri 31'; Widmer (yellow card) 84'	Stadium: Allianz Arena; Attendance: 75,000; Referee: Patrick Ittrich

16 March 2024 26	Darmstadt 98	2–5	Bayern Munich	Darmstadt
15:30 CET (UTC+1)	Skarke 28'; Franjić (yellow card) 67'; Vilhelmsson 90+5'	Report	Musiala 36', 64'; Kane 45+1'; Gnabry 74'; Tel 90+3'	Stadium: Merck-Stadion am Böllenfalltor; Attendance: 17,810; Referee: Tobias Reichel

30 March 2024 27	Bayern Munich	0–2	Borussia Dortmund	Munich
18:30 CET (UTC+1)		Report	Adeyemi 10'; Ryerson 83'	Stadium: Allianz Arena; Attendance: 75,000; Referee: Harm Osmers

6 April 2024 28	1. FC Heidenheim	3–2	Bayern Munich	Heidenheim
15:30 CEST (UTC+2)	Sessa 50'; Kleindienst 51', 79'; Gimber (yellow card) 62'; Dinkçi (yellow card) 89'	Report	Kane 38'; Gnabry 45'	Stadium: Voith-Arena; Attendance: 15,000; Referee: Robert Schröder

13 April 2024 29	Bayern Munich	2–0	1. FC Köln	Munich
15:30 CEST (UTC+2)	Guerreiro 65'; Müller 90+3'	Report	Christensen (yellow card) 5'; Maina (yellow card) 30'; Adamyan (yellow card) 36'	Stadium: Allianz Arena; Attendance: 75,000; Referee: Frank Willenborg

20 April 2024 30	Union Berlin	1–5	Bayern Munich	Berlin
18:30 CEST (UTC+2)	Vertessen 90+1'	Report	Goretzka 29'; Kane 45+1'; Müller 53', 66'; Tel 62'	Stadium: Stadion An der Alten Försterei; Attendance: 22,012; Referee: Sven Jablonski

27 April 2024 31	Bayern Munich	2–1	Eintracht Frankfurt	Munich
15:30 CEST (UTC+2)	Kane 9', 61' (pen.)	Report	Ekitike 23'; Koch (yellow card) 60'; Skhiri (yellow card) 62'; Götze (yellow card) 62'	Stadium: Allianz Arena; Attendance: 75,000; Referee: Daniel Schlager

4 May 2024 32	VfB Stuttgart	3–1	Bayern Munich	Stuttgart
15:30 CEST (UTC+2)	Anton (yellow card) 24'; Stergiou 29'; Jeong 83'; Silas 90+3'	Report	Dier (yellow card) 20'; Kane 37' (pen.); Pavlović (yellow card) 78'	Stadium: MHPArena; Attendance: 60,000; Referee: Tobias Welz

12 May 2024 33	Bayern Munich	2–0	VfL Wolfsburg	Munich
17:30 CEST (UTC+2)	Zvonarek 4'; Goretzka 13'	Report	Majer (yellow card) 53'; Lacroix (yellow card) 90+3'	Stadium: Allianz Arena; Attendance: 75,000; Referee: Bastian Dankert

18 May 2024 34	TSG Hoffenheim	4–2	Bayern Munich	Sinsheim
15:30 CEST (UTC+2)	Beier 8'; Prömel (yellow card) 51'; Grillitsch (yellow card) 54'; Kramarić 68', 85', 87', (yellow card) 88'	Report	Tel 4'; Davies 6'; Zaragoza (yellow card) 90+4'	Stadium: PreZero Arena; Attendance: 30,150; Referee: Marco Fritz

=== DFB-Pokal ===
The first round draw was held on 18 June 2023.

26 September 2023 First round	Preußen Münster	0–4	Bayern Munich	Münster
20:45 CEST (UTC+2)	Kyerewaa (yellow card) 45+3'	Report	Choupo-Moting 9'; Laimer 40'; Krätzig 45+5'; Tel 86'	Stadium: Preußenstadion; Attendance: 12,794; Referee: Matthias Jöllenbeck

1 November 2023 Second round	1. FC Saarbrücken	2–1	Bayern Munich	Saarbrücken
20:45 CET (UTC+1)	Zeitz (yellow card) 10'; Sontheimer 45+1', (yellow card) 72'; Gaus (yellow card) 83', (goal) 90+6'	Report	Müller 16'; Choupo-Moting (yellow card) 40'	Stadium: Ludwigsparkstadion; Attendance: 16,003; Referee: Frank Willenborg

=== DFL-Supercup ===
12 August 2023 Final	Bayern Munich	0–3	RB Leipzig	Munich
20:45 CEST (UTC+2)	Pavard (yellow card) 14'; Upamecano (yellow card) 34'	Report	Olmo 3', 44', 68' (pen.), (yellow card) 71'	Stadium: Allianz Arena; Attendance: 75,000; Referee: Bastian Dankert

=== UEFA Champions League ===
==== Group stage ====
The draw for the group stage was held on 31 August 2023.

===== Group A table =====
Pos	Team	Pld	W	D	L	GF	GA	GD	Pts	Qualification	BAY	CPH	GAL	MUN
1	(Germany) Bayern Munich	6	5	1	0	12	6	+6	16	Advance to knockout phase	—	0–0	2–1	4–3
2	(Denmark) Copenhagen	6	2	2	2	8	8	0	8	Advance to knockout phase	1–2	—	1–0	4–3
3	(Turkey) Galatasaray	6	1	2	3	10	13	−3	5	Transfer to Europa League	1–3	2–2	—	3–3
4	(England) Manchester United	6	1	1	4	12	15	−3	4		0–1	1–0	2–3	—

Source: UEFA
Rules for classification: Group stage tiebreakers

===== Group stage matches =====
20 September 2023 1	Bayern Munich (Germany)	4–3	(England) Manchester United	Munich, Germany
21:00 CEST (UTC+2)	Sané 28'; Gnabry 32'; Kane 53' (pen.); Goretzka (yellow card) 63'; Tel 90+2'	Report	Højlund 49'; Martínez (yellow card) 63'; Casemiro 88', 90+5'	Stadium: Allianz Arena; Attendance: 75,000; Referee: Glenn Nyberg (Sweden)

3 October 2023 2	Copenhagen (Denmark)	1–2	(Germany) Bayern Munich	Copenhagen, Denmark
21:00 CEST (UTC+2)	Meling (yellow card) 54'; Lerager 56', (yellow card) 63'; Vavro (yellow card) 90'	Report	Musiala 67', (yellow card) 69'; Tel 83'	Stadium: Parken Stadium; Attendance: 35,690; Referee: Orel Grinfeld (Israel)

24 October 2023 3	Galatasaray (Turkey)	1–3	(Germany) Bayern Munich	Istanbul, Turkey
19:45 TRT (UTC+3); 18:45 CEST (UTC+2)	Icardi 30' (pen.); Tetê (yellow card) 53'; Ayhan (yellow card) 62'	Report	Coman 8'; Sané (yellow card) 14'; Laimer (yellow card) 32'; Kane 73'; Musiala 79'; Davies (yellow card) 90+5'	Stadium: Rams Park; Attendance: 51,776; Referee: Davide Massa (Italy)

8 November 2023 4	Bayern Munich (Germany)	2–1	(Turkey) Galatasaray	Munich, Germany
21:00 CET (UTC+1)	Davies (yellow card) 19'; Kane 80', 86'	Report	Bardakcı (yellow card) 34'; Bakambu 90+3', (yellow card) 90+6'	Stadium: Allianz Arena; Attendance: 75,000; Referee: António Nobre (Portugal)

29 November 2023 5	Bayern Munich (Germany)	0–0	(Denmark) Copenhagen	Munich, Germany
21:00 CET (UTC+1)	Ulreich (yellow card) 73'	Report	Gonçalves (yellow card) 24'; Falk (yellow card) 55'	Stadium: Allianz Arena; Attendance: 75,000; Referee: Stéphanie Frappart (France)

12 December 2023 6	Manchester United (England)	0–1	(Germany) Bayern Munich	Manchester, England
20:00 GMT (UTC+0); 21:00 CET (UTC+1)	Antony (yellow card) 53'; Amrabat (yellow card) 61'	Report	Coman 70'; Goretzka (yellow card) 88'	Stadium: Old Trafford; Attendance: 73,073; Referee: Espen Eskås (Norway)

==== Knockout phase ====
===== Round of 16 =====
The draw for the round of 16 was held on 18 December 2023.

14 February 2024 First leg	Lazio (Italy)	1–0	(Germany) Bayern Munich	Rome, Italy
21:00 CET (UTC+1)	Immobile 69' (pen.)	Report	Upamecano (red card) 67'; Kimmich (yellow card) 68'	Stadium: Stadio Olimpico; Attendance: 57,470; Referee: François Letexier (France)

5 March 2024 Second leg	Bayern Munich (Germany)	3–0 (3–1 agg.)	(Italy) Lazio	Munich, Germany
21:00 CET (UTC+1)	Kane 38', 66'; Müller 45+2'	Report	Romagnoli (yellow card) 80'; Cataldi (yellow card) 89'; Pellegrini (yellow card) 90+2'	Stadium: Allianz Arena; Attendance: 75,000; Referee: Slavko Vinčić (Slovenia)

===== Quarter-finals =====
The draw for the quarter-finals was held on 15 March 2024.

9 April 2024 First leg	Arsenal (England)	2–2	(Germany) Bayern Munich	London, England
20:00 BST (UTC+1)	Saka 12'; Trossard 76'; Partey (yellow card) 89'	Report	Davies (yellow card) 9'; Gnabry 18'; Kane 32' (pen.), (yellow card) 55'	Stadium: Emirates Stadium; Attendance: 60,221; Referee: Glenn Nyberg (Sweden)

17 April 2024 Second leg	Bayern Munich (Germany)	1–0 (3–2 agg.)	(England) Arsenal	Munich, Germany
21:00 CEST (UTC+2)	Laimer (yellow card) 55'; Kimmich 63', (yellow card) 90+2'	Report	White (yellow card) 84'; Gabriel Jesus (yellow card) 90+3'	Stadium: Allianz Arena; Attendance: 75,000; Referee: Danny Makkelie (Netherlands)

===== Semi-finals =====
The draw for the semi-finals was held on 15 March 2024, after the draw for the quarter-finals.

30 April 2024 First leg	Bayern Munich (Germany)	2–2	(Spain) Real Madrid	Munich, Germany
21:00 CEST (UTC+2)	Mazraoui (yellow card) 43'; Sané 53'; Kane 57' (pen.); Kim (yellow card) 82'	Report	Vinícius 24', 83' (pen.); Kroos (yellow card) 64'; Vázquez (yellow card) 90+1'	Stadium: Allianz Arena; Attendance: 75,000; Referee: Clément Turpin (France)

8 May 2024 Second leg	Real Madrid (Spain)	2–1 (4–3 agg.)	(Germany) Bayern Munich	Madrid, Spain
21:00 CEST (UTC+2)	Joselu 88', 90+1'; Camavinga (yellow card) 90+11'	Report	Davies 68'	Stadium: Santiago Bernabéu; Attendance: 76,579; Referee: Szymon Marciniak (Poland)

== Statistics ==
=== Appearances and goals ===
No.	Pos	Nat	Player	Total		Bundesliga		DFB-Pokal		DFL-Supercup		Champions League	
No.	Pos	Nat	Player	Apps	Goals	Apps	Goals	Apps	Goals	Apps	Goals	Apps	Goals
Goalkeepers
1	GK	(Germany) GER	Manuel Neuer	33	0	23	0	1	0	0	0	9	0
18	GK	(Israel) ISR	Daniel Peretz	2	0	0+1	0	1	0	0	0	0	0
26	GK	(Germany) GER	Sven Ulreich	15	0	11	0	0	0	1	0	3	0
Defenders
2	DF	(France) FRA	Dayot Upamecano	33	1	19+6	1	0	0	1	0	6+1	0
3	DF	(South Korea) KOR	Kim Min-jae	36	1	22+3	1	1	0	0+1	0	7+2	0
4	DF	(Netherlands) NED	Matthijs de Ligt	30	2	16+6	2	1	0	1	0	5+1	0
15	DF	(England) ENG	Eric Dier	20	0	13+2	0	0	0	0	0	5	0
19	DF	(Canada) CAN	Alphonso Davies	42	3	24+5	2	2	0	1	0	7+3	1
20	DF	(Senegal) SEN	Bouna Sarr	5	0	1+1	0	1+1	0	0	0	0+1	0
22	DF	(Portugal) POR	Raphaël Guerreiro	28	3	13+7	3	0+1	0	0	0	4+3	0
23	DF	(France) FRA	Sacha Boey	2	0	1+1	0	0	0	0	0	0	0
28	DF	(Germany) GER	Tarek Buchmann	0	0	0	0	0	0	0	0	0	0
40	DF	(Morocco) MAR	Noussair Mazraoui	29	0	15+4	0	1	0	0+1	0	8	0
41	DF	(Sweden) SWE	Matteo Pérez Vinlöf	1	0	0+1	0	0	0	0	0	0	0
Midfielders
6	MF	(Germany) GER	Joshua Kimmich	43	2	27+1	1	2	0	1	0	12	1
8	MF	(Germany) GER	Leon Goretzka	42	6	25+5	6	1	0	0+1	0	9+1	0
27	MF	(Austria) AUT	Konrad Laimer	43	1	18+11	0	1+1	1	1	0	8+3	0
34	MF	(Croatia) CRO	Lovro Zvonarek	5	1	1+4	1	0	0	0	0	0	0
42	MF	(Germany) GER	Jamal Musiala	38	13	20+4	11	1+1	0	1	0	11	2
45	MF	(Germany) GER	Aleksandar Pavlović	22	2	14+5	2	0	0	0	0	2+1	0
46	MF	(Denmark) DEN	Jonathan Asp Jensen	1	0	0+1	0	0	0	0	0	0	0
Forwards
7	FW	(Germany) GER	Serge Gnabry	20	5	5+5	3	1+1	0	1	0	3+4	2
9	FW	(England) ENG	Harry Kane	45	44	32	36	0	0	0+1	0	12	8
10	FW	(Germany) GER	Leroy Sané	42	10	25+2	8	1+1	0	1	0	11+1	2
11	FW	(France) FRA	Kingsley Coman	27	5	15+2	3	1+1	0	0+1	0	5+2	2
13	FW	(Cameroon) CMR	Eric Maxim Choupo-Moting	34	3	7+20	2	2	1	0	0	0+5	0
17	FW	(Spain) ESP	Bryan Zaragoza	7	0	1+6	0	0	0	0	0	0	0
25	FW	(Germany) GER	Thomas Müller	41	7	20+11	5	1	1	0	0	4+5	1
39	FW	(France) FRA	Mathys Tel	41	10	6+24	7	2	1	1	0	1+7	2
Players transferred out during the season
5	DF	(France) FRA	Benjamin Pavard	1	0	0	0	0	0	1	0	0	0
14	MF	(Germany) GER	Paul Wanner	0	0	0	0	0	0	0	0	0	0
32	FW	(Croatia) CRO	Gabriel Vidović	0	0	0	0	0	0	0	0	0	0
38	MF	(Netherlands) NED	Ryan Gravenberch	1	0	0+1	0	0	0	0	0	0	0
41	DF	(Germany) GER	Frans Krätzig	7	1	0+4	0	1+1	1	0	0	0+1	0
44	DF	(Croatia) CRO	Josip Stanišić	0	0	0	0	0	0	0	0	0	0
46	FW	(Germany) GER	Arijon Ibrahimović	0	0	0	0	0	0	0	0	0	0
46	MF	(Japan) JPN	Taichi Fukui	1	0	0	0	0+1	0	0	0	0	0

Source: Competitions

=== Goalscorers ===
Rank	No.	Pos.	Nat.	Player	Bundesliga	DFB-Pokal	DFL-Supercup	Champions League	Total
1	9	FW	(England)	Harry Kane	36	0	0	8	44
2	42	MF	(Germany)	Jamal Musiala	10	0	0	2	12
3	10	FW	(Germany)	Leroy Sané	8	0	0	2	10
3	39	FW	(France)	Mathys Tel	7	1	0	2	10
5	25	FW	(Germany)	Thomas Müller	5	1	0	1	7
6	8	MF	(Germany)	Leon Goretzka	6	0	0	0	6
7	11	FW	(France)	Kingsley Coman	3	0	0	2	5
7	7	FW	(Germany)	Serge Gnabry	3	0	0	2	5
9	13	FW	(Cameroon)	Eric Maxim Choupo-Moting	2	1	0	0	3
9	22	DF	(Portugal)	Raphaël Guerreiro	3	0	0	0	3
9	19	DF	(Canada)	Alphonso Davies	2	0	0	1	3
12	4	DF	(Netherlands)	Matthijs de Ligt	2	0	0	0	2
12	45	MF	(Germany)	Aleksandar Pavlović	2	0	0	0	2
12	6	MF	(Germany)	Joshua Kimmich	1	0	0	1	2
15	27	MF	(Austria)	Konrad Laimer	0	1	0	0	1
15	41	DF	(Germany)	Frans Krätzig	0	1	0	0	1
15	2	DF	(France)	Dayot Upamecano	1	0	0	0	1
15	3	DF	(South Korea)	Kim Min-jae	1	0	0	0	1
15	34	FW	(Croatia)	Lovro Zvonarek	1	0	0	0	1
Own goals					1	0	0	0	1
Totals					94	5	0	21	120

=== Assists ===
Rank	No.	Pos.	Nat.	Player	Bundesliga	DFB-Pokal	DFL-Supercup	Champions League	Total
1	9	FW	(England)	Harry Kane	8	0	0	4	12
2	10	FW	(Germany)	Leroy Sané	9	0	0	1	10
2	25	FW	(Germany)	Thomas Müller	9	0	0	1	10
4	6	MF	(Germany)	Joshua Kimmich	6	1	0	2	9
5	8	MF	(Germany)	Leon Goretzka	6	1	0	1	8
6	42	MF	(Germany)	Jamal Musiala	5	0	0	1	6
6	39	FW	(France)	Mathys Tel	5	0	0	1	6
8	19	DF	(Canada)	Alphonso Davies	5	0	0	0	5
9	40	DF	(Morocco)	Noussair Mazraoui	3	0	0	1	4
9	27	MF	(Austria)	Konrad Laimer	3	0	0	1	4
11	11	FW	(France)	Kingsley Coman	3	0	0	0	3
12	45	MF	(Germany)	Aleksandar Pavlović	2	0	0	0	2
12	22	DF	(Portugal)	Raphaël Guerreiro	0	0	0	2	2
12	13	FW	(Cameroon)	Eric Maxim Choupo-Moting	2	0	0	0	2
15	20	DF	(Senegal)	Bouna Sarr	0	1	0	0	1
15	41	DF	(Germany)	Frans Krätzig	0	1	0	0	1
15	3	DF	(South Korea)	Kim Min-jae	1	0	0	0	1
15	4	DF	(Netherlands)	Matthijs de Ligt	0	0	0	1	1
15	7	FW	(Germany)	Serge Gnabry	1	0	0	0	1
Totals					68	4	0	16	88
