= Manuel Pisano =

Italian footballer (born 2006)

Personal information
- Full name: Manuel Giuseppe Pisano
- Date of birth: 5 April 2006 (age 20)
- Place of birth: Turin, Italy
- Height: 1.89 m (6 ft 2 in)
- Position: Forward

Team information
- Current team: Imperia

Youth career
- –2017: Barracuda
- 2017–2019: Pozzomaina
- 2019–2022: Juventus
- 2022–2024: Bayern Munich
- 2024–2025: Como

Senior career*
| Years | Team | Apps | (Gls) |
| 2023–2024 | Bayern Munich II | 13 | (0) |
| 2026 | Vis Pesaro | 3 | (0) |
| 2026– | Imperia | 6 | (0) |

International career^{‡}
| 2021–2022 | Italy U16 | 9 | (1) |
- * Club domestic league appearances and goals as of 23:45, 15 November 2026 (UTC) ‡ National team caps and goals as of 23:45, 2 June 2022 (UTC)

Manuel Giuseppe Pisano (born 5 April 2006) is an Italian professional footballer who plays as a forward for Serie D club Imperia.

== Club career ==
=== Early career ===
Pisano was born in Turin, Italy. He started his career at Barracuda (under-11) and then at Pozzomaina (under-12). Pisano had a trial at AC Milan, with whom he impressed during a tournament in Palermo, before Juventus signed him on 2019, aged 13. During the 2021–22 season he wore the Juventus U16 shirt, scoring six goals.

=== Bayern Munich ===
In May 2022, Pisano moved to Germany and joined Bayern Munich's under-17 team.

He made his professional debut coming off the bench as a substitute during a 4–1 win Regionalliga Bayern match for Bayern Munich II against 1. FC Schweinfurt 05 on 16 September 2023.

=== Como ===
On 30 July 2024, Pisano moved back to his native Italy and joined newly promoted Serie A club Como on a permanent transfer, initially joining the Primavera squad. On 30 January 2026, he agreed to an early contract termination with the club, making him a free agent for the rest of the 2025–26 season.

=== Vis Pesaro ===
On 25 February 2026, Pisano signed with Serie C club Vis Pesaro, as a free agent.

=== Imperia ===
On 10 September 2026, he signed with Serie D club Imperia, as a free agent ahead of the 2026–27 season.

== International career ==
He has represented Italy at youth level internationally, featuring with the under-16 team.

== Style of play ==
Holger Seitz, who coached Pisano at Bayern Munich II, was impressed by his physicality and coldness in goal, as he was already 1.87 m (6 ft 2 in) tall at age 16.

== Career statistics ==
=== Club ===
As of match played 18 April 2026

Appearances and goals by club, season and competition
| Club | Season | League | | | Cup | | Total | |
| Club | Season | Division | Apps | Goals | Apps | Goals | Apps | Goals |
|---|---|---|---|---|---|---|---|---|
| Bayern Munich II | 2023–24 | Regionalliga Bayern | 13 | 0 | — | | 13 | 0 |
| Bayern Munich II | Total | | 13 | 0 | — | | 13 | 0 |
| Vis Pesaro | 2025–26 | Serie C | 3 | 0 | — | | 3 | 0 |
| Vis Pesaro | Total | | 3 | 0 | 0 | 0 | 3 | 0 |
| Career Total | | | 16 | 0 | 0 | 0 | 16 | 0 |

=== International ===
As of match played 2 June 2022

Appearances and goals by national team, year and competition
| National team | Year | Apps | Goals |
|---|---|---|---|
| Italy U16 | 2021 | 7 | 1 |
| Italy U16 | 2022 | 2 | 0 |
| Career total | | 9 | 1 |
