= Yann Sommer =

Swiss footballer (born 1988)

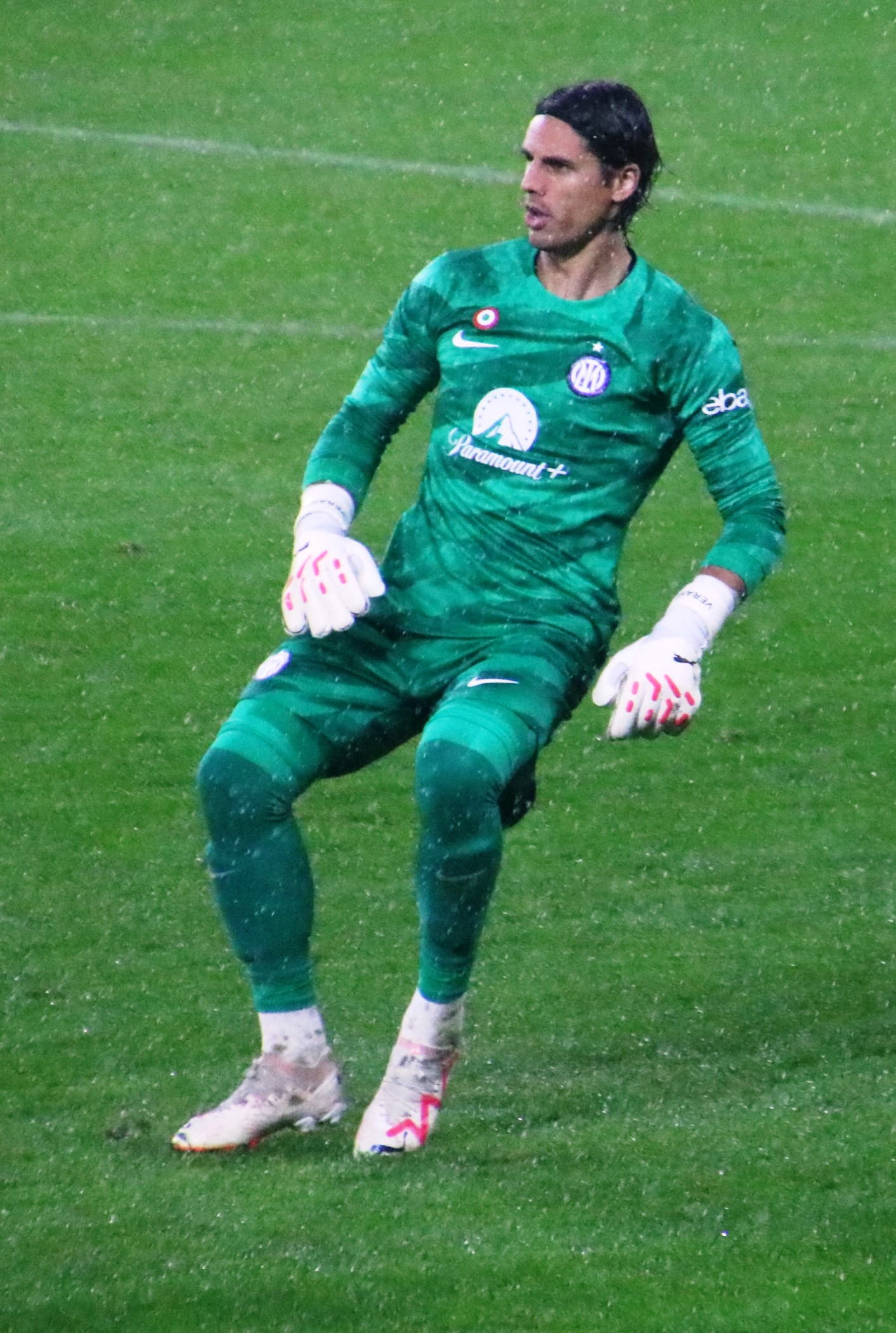
- Sommer with Inter Milan in 2023

Personal information
- Full name: Yann Sommer
- Date of birth: 17 December 1988 (age 37)
- Place of birth: Morges, Switzerland
- Height: 1.83 m (6 ft 0 in)
- Position: Goalkeeper

Team information
- Current team: Club Brugge
- Number: 1

Youth career
- 1996–1997: FC Herrliberg
- 1997–2003: Concordia
- 2003–2005: FC Basel

Senior career*
Years	Team	Apps	(Gls)
2005–2007	FC Basel U21	42	(0)
2007–2014	FC Basel	113	(0)
2007–2009	→ FC Vaduz (loan)	50	(0)
2009–2010	→ Grasshoppers (loan)	33	(0)
2014–2023	Borussia Mönchengladbach	272	(0)
2023	Bayern Munich	19	(0)
2023–2026	Inter Milan	100	(0)
2026–	Club Brugge	10	(0)

International career
2003–2004	Switzerland U16	6	(0)
2003–2005	Switzerland U17	10	(0)
2005–2007	Switzerland U19	18	(0)
2007–2011	Switzerland U21	31	(0)
2009	Switzerland U20	1	(0)
2012–2024	Switzerland	94	(0)
Medal record
Men's football
Representing Switzerland
UEFA European Under-21 Championship
Runner-up	2011 Denmark
- * Club domestic league appearances and goals as of 22:45, 30 October 2026 (UTC)

Yann Sommer (born 17 December 1988) is a Swiss professional footballer who plays as a goalkeeper for Belgian Pro League club Club Brugge. He is known for his reflexes and agility.

Sommer began his career at Basel, where he won the Swiss Super League on four consecutive occasions. He also won the Swiss Challenge League and two Liechtenstein Football Cups while on loan to Vaduz. In 2014, he moved to German side Borussia Mönchengladbach, where he remained for nine years, before signing for Bayern Munich in January 2023, where he won a Bundesliga title. In August, Sommer joined Italian side Inter Milan. With them, he won two Serie A titles, a Coppa Italia and helped them reach the final of UEFA Champions League in 2025.

Sommer made his debut for the Switzerland national team in 2012. He represented the nation at the FIFA World Cup in 2014, 2018 and 2022, and the UEFA European Championship in 2016, 2020 and 2024 before retiring from international play in August 2024.

== Club career ==
=== Basel ===
Born in Morges, Vaud, Sommer played as a child in the youth teams of Herrliberg and later of Concordia Basel. He moved to the Basel youth setup in 2003. He signed his first professional contract with Basel in 2005. He became the first-choice goalkeeper in the under-21 squad almost immediately, fending off contenders like Jayson Leutwiler and Orkan Avci, and was third-choice for the senior squad behind Franco Costanzo and Louis Crayton.

During the summer of 2007, Sommer signed a new contract lasting until 2011, and was loaned out to Liechtensteiner club Vaduz to gain first-team experience in an environment somewhat more competitive than the reserves in the Swiss 1. Liga. He was made the first-choice goalkeeper and played 33 matches over the course of the 2007–08 Swiss Challenge League season, playing a major part in Vaduz's promotion to the Swiss Super League. His loan deal was then extended to last until January 2009. He made his Super League debut for Vaduz on 20 July 2008 in the 2–1 away win against Luzern. Sommer was recalled to Basel on 7 January 2009 because the club's first-choice goalkeeper, Franco Costanzo, was injured.

Sommer made his Super League debut for Basel in a 3–2 defeat to Young Boys at the Stade de Suisse, Wankdorf, on 7 February 2009. He played six matches for Basel up until the end of the season. On 16 June, he joined Grasshoppers on a one-season-long loan. During his season there, he played 33 league matches.

On 14 June 2010, Sommer signed a five-year contract with Basel. He served as second-choice goalkeeper behind Franco Costanzo. In March 2011, Basel announced it would not offer Costanzo a contract extension, therefore making Sommer the club's first-choice goalkeeper. Sommer played five Super League matches during the 2010–11 season and so was part of the championship-winning team.

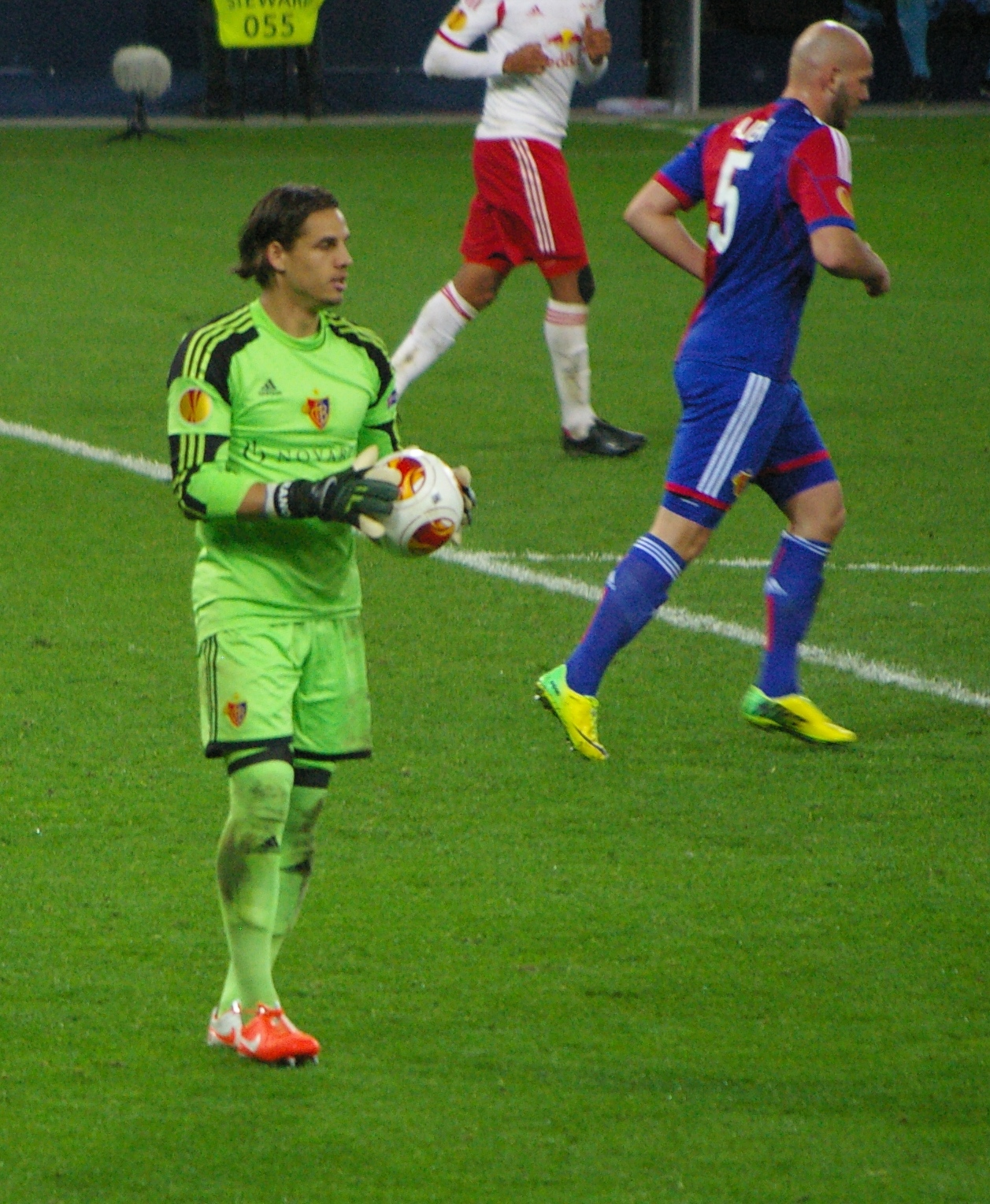
Sommer in a Europa League match against RedBull Salzburg in March 2014

Sommer made his UEFA Champions League debut on 14 September 2011 in the 2–1 home win against Oțelul Galați. He was first-choice goalkeeper in the 2011–12 season, after the end of which he won the double of the league and Swiss Cup.

At the end of the 2012–13 season, Sommer won the league title for the third consecutive time, having played in all 36 league matches. Basel also finished as runners-up in the Swiss Cup. In the 2012–13 UEFA Europa League, Basel advanced to the semi-finals, where they were matched against reigning Champions League holders Chelsea. Basel was eliminated 2–5 on aggregate.

At the end of the 2013–14 season, Sommer won the league championship with Basel. They also reached the final of the 2013–14 Swiss Cup, but were beaten 2–0 by Zürich after extra time. In the 2013–14 Champions League, Basel finished the group stage in third position to qualify for Europa League knockout phase, where they advanced as far as the quarter-finals. In their 2013–14 season, Basel played a total of 68 matches: 36 Swiss League fixtures, six Swiss Cup, six Champions League, ten Europa League and ten test matches. Sommer totaled 58 appearances: 35 League, two Cup, six Champions League and six Europa League, as well five in the test games. However, Sommer managed to keep 65 clean sheets in 170 appearances in all competitions with Basel.

=== Borussia Mönchengladbach ===
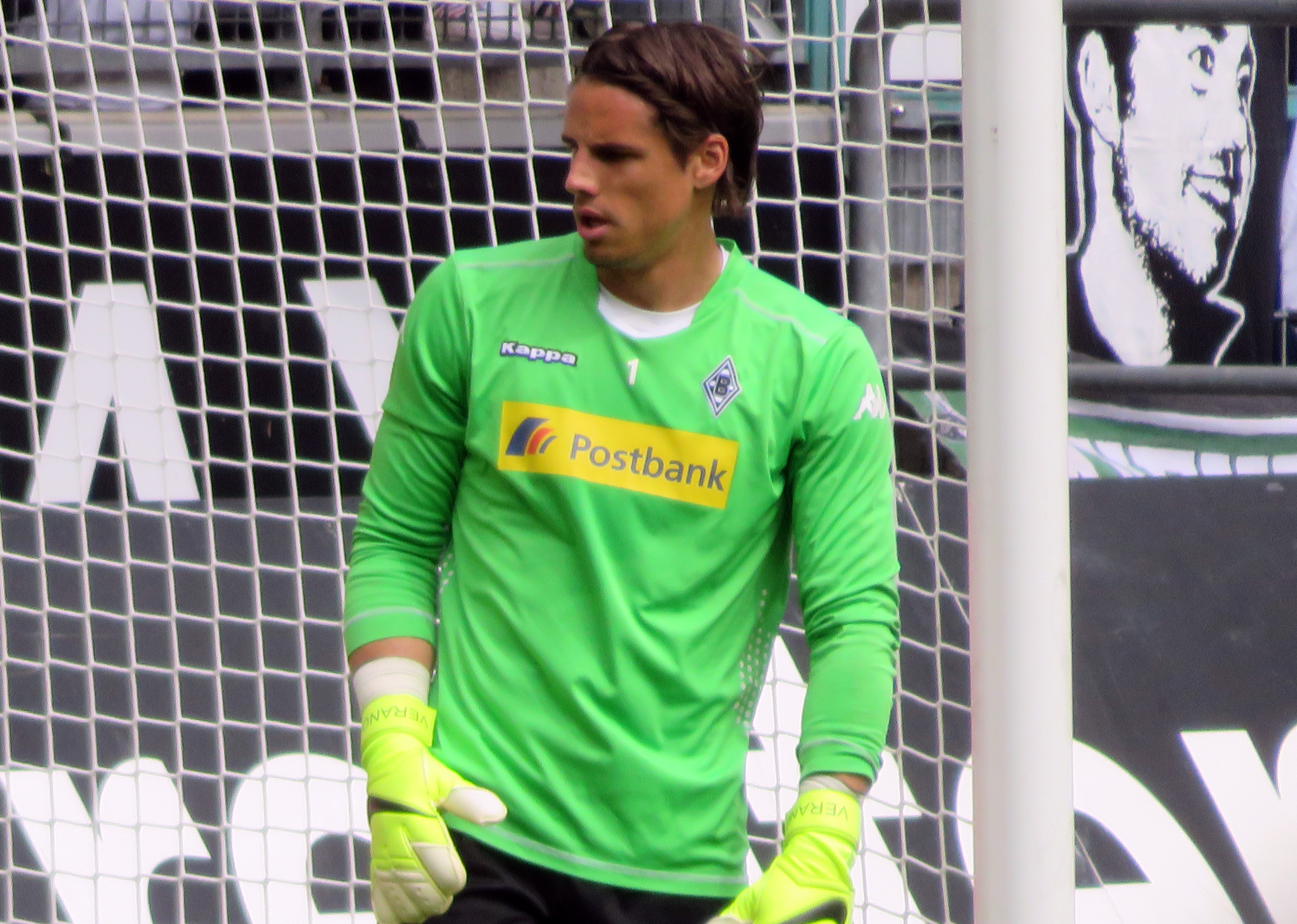
Sommer training with Gladbach in 2015

On 10 March 2014, Sommer signed a five-year contract with Bundesliga side Borussia Mönchengladbach, effective from 1 July. He was signed to replace Marc-André ter Stegen, who had joined Barcelona. In Sommer's first season at Mönchengladbach, 2014–15, Gladbach finished in third place in the Bundesliga, club's highest league finish since 1978. The club also managed to beat its record of consecutive matches without defeat, exceeding the record of 17 matches it had set during the 1970–71 season.

Sommer's debut came against Homburg in the DFB-Pokal, where Gladbach won 3–1. Sommer played against VfB Stuttgart on the opening day in a 1–1 draw. He was famously lobbed from long range by teammate Christoph Kramer against Borussia Dortmund in a 1–0 defeat, but Gladbach went on to secure qualification for the UEFA Champions League with one match remaining. At the season's conclusion, Sommer was named Gladbach's player of the season.

The 2015–16 season began poorly: Gladbach lost its opening match 4–0 to Borussia Dortmund, with Sommer being blamed for the first goal. The club was reported to be in large trouble, and before its first Champions League match of the season, the club's players held crisis talks to discuss their problems. After losing 3–0 to Sevilla, Sommer was heavily criticized for his play. After a fifth-straight Bundesliga defeat, against rivals 1. FC Köln, coach Lucien Favre resigned. In contrast to the previous year, it was the worst start to a season Gladbach had ever suffered.

Under new interim boss André Schubert, the club's dramatically improved with four wins from four matches, resulting in Schubert's permanent appointment. Sommer was forced to sit out against VfL Wolfsburg due to a broken nose, having injured it against Manchester City in the Champions League. He was replaced for the Wolfsburg match by Tobias Sippel. Sommer eventually played in all of the remaining Bundesliga matches, with his performances leading to interest from Manchester City. However, Borussia Mönchengladbach finished fourth in the 2015–16 season, and qualified for the 2016–17 UEFA Champions League, in which they finished third in their group which had Barcelona, Manchester City and Celtic, then reached the Europa League round of 16, before being knocked out by Schalke 04 on the away goal rule after a 3–3 draw on aggregate.

In November 2019, Sommer extended his contract until 2023. In the 2020–21 UEFA Champions League, Borussia Mönchengladbach reached the round of 16, where they lost against Manchester City. On 27 August 2022, Sommer made 19 saves in a 1–1 away draw against Bayern Munich, to be a Bundesliga record.

=== Bayern Munich ===
In December 2022, Bayern's longtime keeper Manuel Neuer suffered a lower leg fracture during a ski trip and was out until the end of the season, necessitating the signing of a replacement. On 19 January 2023, Sommer left Gladbach, having spent eight and a half years playing for Die Fohlen, and joined Bayern Munich for €8 million on a contract until July 2025. On 20 January, he made his debut for Bayern in a 1–1 away draw against RB Leipzig.

He started Bayern's final 25 fixtures of the 2022–23 season, winning the Bundesliga title with the Bavarian club.

=== Inter Milan ===
On 7 August 2023, Sommer joined Italian club Inter Milan, signing a contract until 2026. He was sold to Inter for 6.75 million Euros. Sommer won his first Derby della Madonnina against AC Milan, as Inter thrashed their rivals 5–1 on 16 September 2023.

In January 2024, Sommer won his first silverware with Inter, the 2023 Supercoppa Italiana, keeping clean sheets in both the semi-final against Lazio and the final against Napoli. He ended the season by winning the national championship in a third country as Inter won their 20th Scudetto. He was named as the goalkeeper in the Serie A Team of the Year, having kept 19 clean sheets in 34 Serie A matches.

On 6 May 2025, Sommer was named Player of the Match in Inter's 4–3 UEFA Champions League semi-final second leg win over Barcelona after making seven crucial saves during the match. However, Inter were eventually defeated 5–0 by Paris Saint-Germain in the final, with Sommer describing it as "a bitter evening" and acknowledging that PSG were deserved winners. He left the club after the 2025–26 season ended, having secured the domestic double.

=== Club Brugge ===
On 14 July 2026, Sommer joined Belgian side Club Brugge, signing a three-year contract.

== International career ==
=== Youth ===
Sommer has represented Switzerland at various age levels, including at under-16, -17, -19 and -21 levels. He made his Swiss U-16s debut on 26 August 2003, but the match ended in a 0–5 defeat against Germany. His U-17s debut was on 20 November 2003 in the 1–1 draw against England.

Sommer made his professional debut for the Swiss under-21s on 22 August 2007, as he was substituted in at half-time during the 2–1 away win against Belgium. He was goalkeeper and captain of the Swiss U-21 team which competed in the final tournament of the 2011 UEFA European Under-21 Championship, hosted by Denmark between 11 and 25 June 2011. The Swiss team reached the 2011 UEFA European Under-21 Championship Final on 25 June without conceding a goal, but lost 2–0 to Spain. This was Sommer's final match for the under-21s.

=== Senior ===
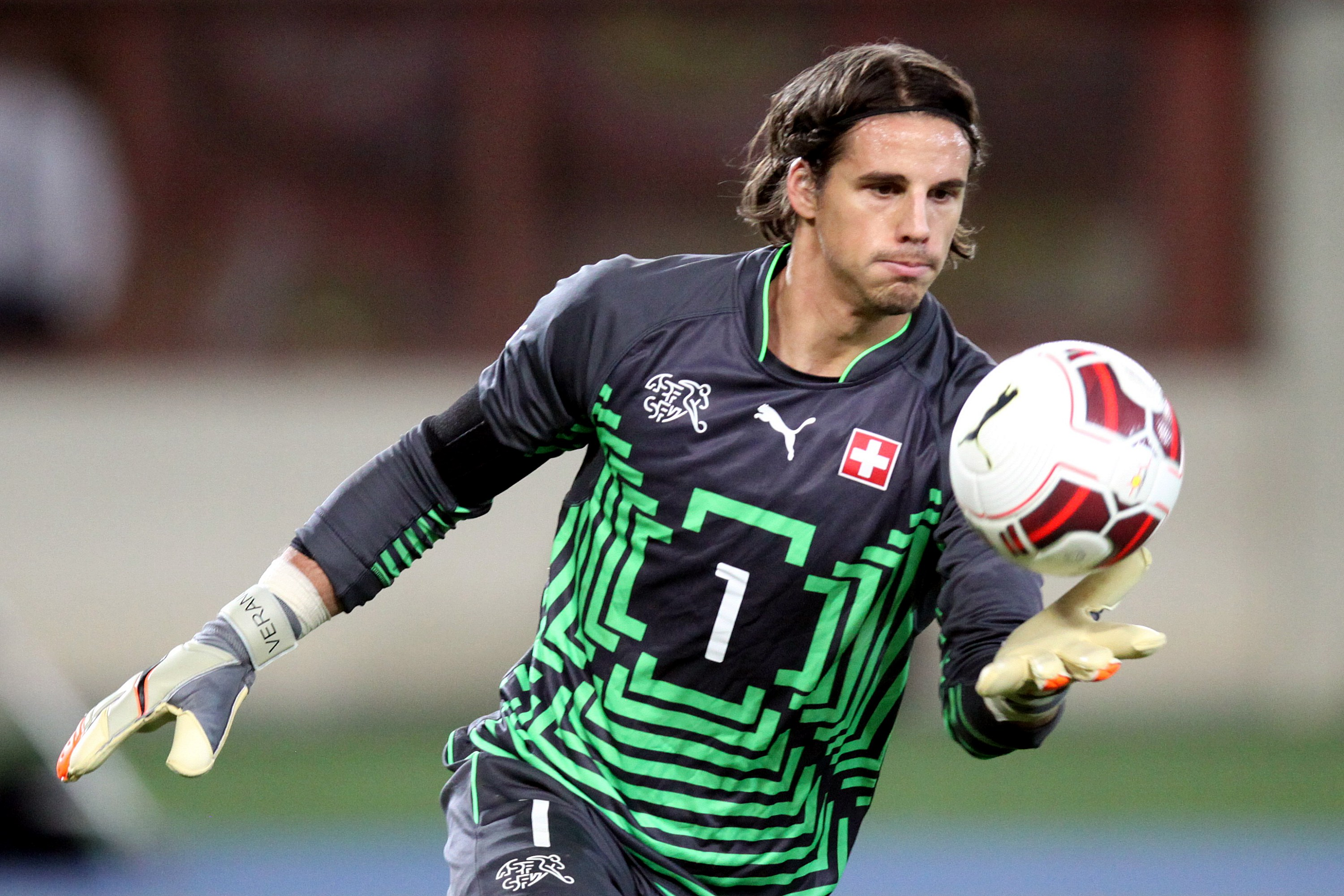
Sommer playing for Switzerland in November 2015

Sommer made his debut for the Switzerland senior side on 30 May 2012 at the Swissporarena, Lucerne, in a 0–1 defeat against Romania in a friendly match.

On 13 May, he was named in Switzerland's 23-man squad for the 2014 World Cup in Brazil, where he served as back-up goalkeeper to Diego Benaglio.

Alongside Bundesliga colleagues Roman Bürki and Marwin Hitz, Sommer was one of those three goalkeepers included in Switzerland's UEFA Euro 2016 squad. Sommer was Switzerland's first-choice goalkeeper, playing all four of the nation's matches. Sommer was unable to prevent Switzerland being eliminated by Poland in the round of 16, losing 5–4 on penalties, after a 1–1 draw.

In June 2018, he was included in the Switzerland's 23-man squad for the 2018 World Cup and made his World Cup debut in the team's 1–1 draw with Brazil in the opening match of Group E.

In May 2019, he played in 2019 UEFA Nations League Finals, where his team finished fourth.

On 31 May 2021, Sommer was included in the 26-man Swiss squad for the postponed UEFA Euro 2020. On 28 June, Sommer saved a penalty from Kylian Mbappé during the penalty shoot-out, in which Switzerland won 5–4 against France in the round of 16, after a 3–3 draw. On 2 July, he made eight saves in extra time alone against Spain in the Euro 2020 quarter-finals; however, Switzerland lost 1–3 on penalties, after a 1–1 draw.

In November 2022, Sommer was chosen to be a member of the Swiss squad for the 2022 FIFA World Cup. He was named Man of the Match in his team's opening group game against Cameroon, which his team won 1–0.

On 7 June 2024, Sommer was selected in the Switzerland squad for UEFA Euro 2024. He was the starting goalkeeper in all his country's matches, helping them reach the quarter-finals.

On 19 August 2024, he announced his retirement from international football.

== Personal life ==
Sommer married Alina in August 2019, whom he began dating in 2016. They have two daughters. In August 2026, Sommer became an investor and shareholder in the investment group that acquired 90% of Portuguese club Estrela da Amadora for €40 million, alongside Thomas Müller, Mats Hummels and Lucas Hernandez.

== Career statistics ==
=== Club ===
As of match played 30 October 2026

Appearances and goals by club, season and competition
Club	Season	League			National cup (Note: Includes Liechtenstein Cup, Swiss Cup, DFB-Pokal)		Europe		Other		Total	
Club	Season	Division	Apps	Goals	Apps	Goals	Apps	Goals	Apps	Goals	Apps	Goals
Basel U21	2005–06	Swiss 1. Liga	12	0	—		—		—		12	0
Basel U21	2006–07	Swiss 1. Liga	24	0	—		—		—		24	0
Basel U21	2010–11	Swiss 1. Liga	6	0	—		—		—		6	0
Basel U21	Total		42	0	—		—		—		42	0
Vaduz (loan)	2007–08	Swiss Challenge League	33	0	0	0	2 (Note: Appearances in UEFA Cup)	0	—		35	0
Vaduz (loan)	2008–09	Swiss Super League	17	0	0	0	2	0	—		19	0
Vaduz (loan)	Total		50	0	0	0	4	0	—		54	0
Basel	2008–09	Swiss Super League	6	0	1	0	0	0	—		7	0
Basel	2010–11	Swiss Super League	5	0	4	0	—		—		9	0
Basel	2011–12	Swiss Super League	31	0	4	0	8 (Note: Appearances in UEFA Champions League)	0	—		43	0
Basel	2012–13	Swiss Super League	36	0	3	0	19 (Note: Five appearances in UEFA Champions League, fourteen appearances in UEFA Europa League)	0	—		58	0
Basel	2013–14	Swiss Super League	35	0	2	0	16 (Note: Ten appearances in UEFA Champions League, six appearances in UEFA Europa League)	0	—		53	0
Basel	Total		113	0	14	0	43	0	—		170	0
Grasshoppers (loan)	2009–10	Swiss Super League	33	0	0	0	—		—		33	0
Borussia Mönchengladbach	2014–15	Bundesliga	34	0	4	0	10 (Note: Appearances in UEFA Europa League)	0	—		48	0
Borussia Mönchengladbach	2015–16	Bundesliga	32	0	3	0	6	0	—		41	0
Borussia Mönchengladbach	2016–17	Bundesliga	34	0	4	0	12 (Note: Eight appearances in UEFA Champions League, four appearances in UEFA Europa League)	0	—		50	0
Borussia Mönchengladbach	2017–18	Bundesliga	30	0	3	0	—		—		33	0
Borussia Mönchengladbach	2018–19	Bundesliga	34	0	1	0	—		—		35	0
Borussia Mönchengladbach	2019–20	Bundesliga	34	0	2	0	6	0	—		42	0
Borussia Mönchengladbach	2020–21	Bundesliga	31	0	0	0	8	0	—		39	0
Borussia Mönchengladbach	2021–22	Bundesliga	33	0	3	0	—		—		36	0
Borussia Mönchengladbach	2022–23	Bundesliga	10	0	1	0	—		—		11	0
Borussia Mönchengladbach	Total		272	0	21	0	42	0	—		335	0
Bayern Munich	2022–23	Bundesliga	19	0	2	0	4	0	—		25	0
Inter Milan	2023–24	Serie A	34	0	0	0	7	0	2 (Note: Appearances in Supercoppa Italiana)	0	43	0
Inter Milan	2024–25	Serie A	33	0	0	0	14	0	6 (Note: Two appearances in Supercoppa Italiana, four appearances in FIFA Club World Cup)	0	53	0
Inter Milan	2025–26	Serie A	33	0	0	0	10	0	0	0	43	0
Inter Milan	Total		100	0	0	0	31	0	8	0	139	0
Club Brugge	2026–27	Belgian Pro League	10	0	0	0	3	0	1 (Note: Appearance in Belgian Super Cup)	0	14	0
Career total			639	0	37	0	136	0	9	0	812	0

=== International ===
Appearances and goals by national team and year
National team	Year	Apps	Goals
Switzerland	2012	2	0
Switzerland	2013	3	0
Switzerland	2014	5	0
Switzerland	2015	5	0
Switzerland	2016	10	0
Switzerland	2017	8	0
Switzerland	2018	10	0
Switzerland	2019	10	0
Switzerland	2020	5	0
Switzerland	2021	14	0
Switzerland	2022	8	0
Switzerland	2023	7	0
Switzerland	2024	7	0
Total		94	0

== Honours ==
FC Vaduz

- Swiss Challenge League: 2007–08
- Liechtenstein Cup: 2007–08

FC Basel

- Swiss Super League: 2010–11, 2011–12, 2012–13, 2013–14
- Swiss Cup: 2011–12

Bayern Munich

- Bundesliga: 2022–23

Inter Milan

- Serie A: 2023–24, 2025–26
- Coppa Italia: 2025–26
- Supercoppa Italiana: 2023
- UEFA Champions League runner-up: 2024–25

Switzerland U21

- UEFA European Under-21 Championship runner-up: 2011

Individual

- UEFA European Under-21 Championship Team of the Tournament: 2011
- Swiss Super League Team of the Year: 2013–14
- Credit Suisse Player of the Year: 2016, 2018, 2021
- Bundesliga Fantasy Team of the Season: 2019–20
- The Athletic European Men's Team of the Season: 2023–24
- Serie A Team of the Season: 2023–24
- Serie A Team of the Year: 2023–24
- ESM Team of the Year: 2023–24
