= Luka Parkadze =

Georgian footballer

Luka Parkadze ლუკა პარკაძე
Personal information
- Full name: Luka Parkadze
- Date of birth: 6 April 2005 (age 21)
- Place of birth: Tbilisi, Georgia
- Height: 1.75 m (5 ft 9 in)
- Positions: Attacking midfielder; winger

Team information
- Current team: Rustavi
- Number: 20

Youth career
- –2022: Dinamo Tbilisi

Senior career*
Years	Team	Apps	(Gls)
2022	Dinamo Tbilisi	3	(0)
2023	Dinamo Tbilisi II	1	(0)
2023	→ FC Gagra (loan)	3	(0)
2023–2025	Bayern Munich II	0	(0)
2023–2024	→ Admira Wacker (loan)	1	(0)
2024–2025	→ VSG Altglienicke (loan)	15	(1)
2024	→ VSG Altglienicke II (loan)	2	(1)
2025–2026	Austria Salzburg	12	(0)
2025–	Rustavi	4	(0)

International career^{‡}
2021–2022	Georgia U17	19	(5)
2022	Georgia U18	3	(3)
2022	Georgia U19	3	(0)
2025–	Georgia U21	4	(0)
- * Club domestic league appearances and goals as of 1 September 2026 ‡ National team caps and goals as of 18 November 2025

Luka Parkadze (Georgian: ლუკა პარკაძე, romanized: luk'a p'ark'adze; born 6 April 2005) is a Georgian professional footballer who plays as an attacking midfielder and winger for Erovnuli Liga club Rustavi.

== Club career ==
=== Dinamo Tbilisi ===
Parkadze is a youth product of Dinamo Tbilisi, and began playing with their senior team in the Erovnuli Liga in 2022 at the age of 17.

=== Bayern Munich ===
He signed a pre-contract with German giants Bayern Munich reserve team on 18 August 2022, set to join for the 2023–24 season.

In September 2022, he was named by English newspaper The Guardian as one of the best players born in 2005 worldwide.

==== Loan to Admira Wacker ====
After joining Bayern Munich II, he was sent to Austrian 2. Liga club Admira Wacker on a season-long loan.

==== Loan to VSG Altglienicke ====
On 14 August 2024, Parkadze joined Regionalliga Nordost club VSG Altglienicke on loan for the 2024–25 season.

=== Austria Salzburg ===
On 29 August 2025, he returned to Austria and joined recently 2. Liga promoted club Austria Salzburg, permanently on a free transfer.

== International career ==
Parkadze is a youth international for Georgia, having played for the Georgia U17s, U18s, and U19s.

== Career statistics ==
=== Club ===
As of match played 8 November 2025

Appearances and goals by club, season and competition
Club	Season	League			Cup		Other		Total	
Club	Season	Division	Apps	Goals	Apps	Goals	Apps	Goals	Apps	Goals
Dinamo Tbilisi	2022	Erovnuli Liga	3	0	0	0	0	0	3	0
Dinamo Tbilisi	Total		3	0	0	0	0	0	3	0
Dinamo Tbilisi II	2023	Erovnuli Liga 2	1	0	0	0	0	0	1	0
Dinamo Tbilisi II	Total		1	0	0	0	0	0	1	0
FC Gagra (loan)	2023	Erovnuli Liga	3	0	0	0	0	0	3	0
FC Gagra (loan)	Total		3	0	0	0	0	0	3	0
Bayern Munich II	2023–24	Regionalliga Bayern	0	0	—		—		0	0
Bayern Munich II	Total		0	0	—		—		0	0
Admira Wacker (loan)	2023–24	2. Liga	1	0	0	0	0	0	1	0
Admira Wacker (loan)	Total		1	0	0	0	0	0	1	0
VSG Altglienicke (loan)	2024–25	Regionalliga Nordost	15	1	5 (Note: Appearances in the Berlin Cup)	4	0	0	20	5
VSG Altglienicke (loan)	Total		15	1	5	4	0	0	20	5
VSG Altglienicke II (loan)	2024–25	Berlin-Liga	2	1	0	0	—		2	1
VSG Altglienicke II (loan)	Total		2	1	0	0	—		2	1
Austria Salzburg	2025–26	2. Liga	5	0	—		0	0	5	0
Austria Salzburg	Total		5	0	0	0	0	0	5	0
Career Total			30	2	5	4	0	0	35	6
