= Johannes Schenk =

German footballer (born 2003)

Personal information
- Date of birth: 13 January 2003 (age 23)
- Place of birth: Schweinfurt, Germany
- Height: 1.91 m (6 ft 3 in)
- Position: Goalkeeper

Team information
- Current team: Beveren (on loan from SC Preußen Münster)
- Number: 1

Youth career
- –2017: 1. FC Nürnberg
- 2017–2022: Bayern Munich

Senior career*
Years	Team	Apps	(Gls)
2021–2024	Bayern Munich II	29	(0)
2022–2024	Bayern Munich	0	(0)
2023–2024	→ SC Preußen Münster (loan)	8	(0)
2024	→ SC Preußen Münster II (loan)	1	(0)
2024–	SC Preußen Münster	64	(0)
2026–	→ Beveren (loan)	4	(0)
- * Club domestic league appearances and goals as of 29 August 2026

Johannes Schenk (born 13 January 2003) is a German professional footballer who plays a goalkeeper for Belgian Pro League club Beveren, on loan from 3. Liga club SC Preußen Münster.

== Club career ==
Schenk is a youth product of 1. FC Nürnberg and Bayern Munich, after debuting with Bayern Munich II, and getting called-up with Bayern Munich's first team, on 26 July 2023, he joined 3. Liga club SC Preußen Münster on a season-long loan.

Schenk made his debut with SC Preußen Münster on September 26 during the 4–0 home loss first round match of the DFB Pokal against his parent club Bayern Munich, however he made some notorious and significant saves as he started the match featuring full time.

On 17 June 2024, Schenk was permanently transferred to SC Preußen Münster after the team achieved promotion to the 2. Bundesliga, while Bayern Munich secured a future buy-back option.
