= Liu Shaoziyang =

Chinese footballer (born 2003)

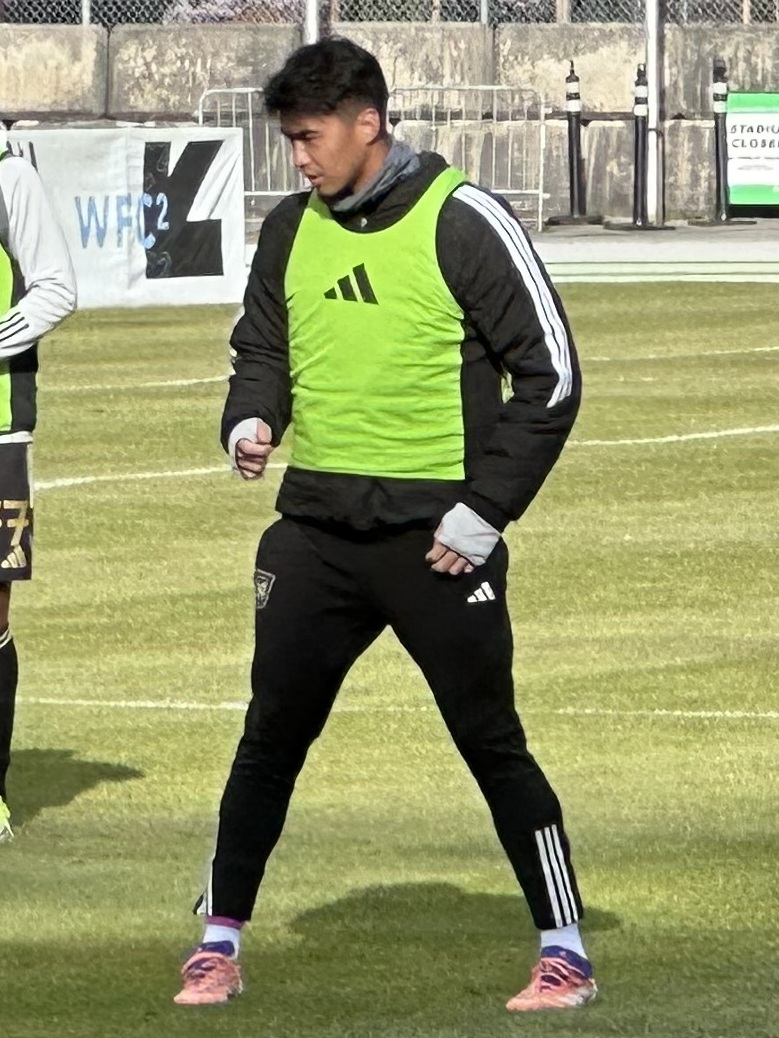
- Liu with Los Angeles FC 2 in 2026

Personal information
- Date of birth: 11 December 2003 (age 22)
- Place of birth: Yongjia County, Zhejiang, China
- Height: 1.91 m (6 ft 3 in)
- Position: Goalkeeper

Team information
- Current team: Beijing Guoan
- Number: 31

Youth career
- 2014–2021: Wuhan Three Towns
- 2019: → Nama Sports (loan)
- 2019–2021: → AE Josep Maria Gené (loan)

Senior career*
Years	Team	Apps	(Gls)
2022–2024	Bayern Munich II	0	(0)
2022	→ Austria Klagenfurt (loan)	0	(0)
2022	→ Austria Klagenfurt II (loan)	13	(0)
2023	→ Grazer AK (loan)	0	(0)
2023–2024	→ SV Ried (loan)	0	(0)
2023–2024	→ SV Ried II (loan)	13	(0)
2024–2025	SV Horn	14	(0)
2025	Bayern Munich II	0	(0)
2025–2026	Los Angeles FC 2	2	(0)
2026–	Beijing Guoan	0	(0)

International career^{‡}
2023	China U21	1	(0)
- * Club domestic league appearances and goals as of 25 September 2025 ‡ National team caps and goals as of 23:30, 24 March 2023 (UTC)

Liu Shaoziyang (Chinese: 刘邵子洋; pinyin: Liú Shàozǐyáng; born 11 December 2003) is a Chinese professional footballer who plays as a goalkeeper for Chinese Super League club Beijing Guoan.

== Club career ==
=== Early career ===
Born in Wenzhou, Zhejiang but moved to Wuhan as a child, Liu started his career as an outfield player. He switched to play in goal when a coach at his primary school noted his height and potential ability as a goalkeeper. Against his mother's wishes, Liu started training as a goalkeeper with his coach before the main school training every day. When his mother did eventually see him play in goal and produce some good saves, she told the coach that she supported Liu playing as a goalkeeper.

In 2014, Liu joined the youth team of Wuhan Three Towns before moving to Spain to study and improve his footballing ability.

=== Bayern Munich ===
In January 2021, Liu began training with German giants Bayern Munich. He would regularly return to the Bavarian club for further training throughout the year, and in December it was announced that a professional contract had been signed. In signing for Bayern Munich, Liu became their first ever Chinese player. He was registered with the reserve team.

==== Loans to Austria ====
On 1 February 2022, it was announced that Liu had signed for Austrian Bundesliga club Austria Klagenfurt on loan until the end of the 2022–23 season. He was only called-up with the senior team once for a 2–2 away Austrian Bundesliga draw against WSG Tirol on 7 August 2022 as an unused substitute. He played mostly with the reserves, Austria Klagenfurt II, at the Kärntner Liga, and played two matches with the under-18 team in their youth sector at the ÖFB Jugendliga U18. His loan spell was cut short at the halfway mark of the season and he was loaned instead to 2. Liga club Grazer AK for the remaining half of the season.

On 4 July 2023, he signed for recently relegated 2. Liga club SV Ried on loan for the 2023–24 season. Although registered with the senior team, he only featured with the reserve team SV Ried II in the Austrian Regionalliga Central throughout his loan-spell.

=== SV Horn ===
On 31 July 2024, he moved to 2. Liga club SV Horn on a two-year deal until 2026.

=== Los Angeles FC 2 ===
After penning a contract with his former club Bayern Munich II for only the summer of 2025, Liu signed for MLS Next Pro club Los Angeles FC 2 on 25 September 2025.

=== Beijing Guoan ===
On 1 July 2026, Liu returned to China and joined Chinese Super League club Beijing Guoan.

== International career ==
Liu has represented China at the under-21 level internationally.

== Personal life ==
Liu has named German goalkeeper Marc-André ter Stegen as an inspiration to him. He supports Premier League club Everton.

== Career statistics ==
=== Club ===
As of match played 25 May 2025

Appearances and goals by club, season and competition
Club	Season	League			Cup		Continental		Other		Total	
Club	Season	Division	Apps	Goals	Apps	Goals	Apps	Goals	Apps	Goals	Apps	Goals
Bayern Munich II	2022–23	Regionalliga Bayern	0	0	–		–		–		0	0
Austria Klagenfurt (loan)	2022–23	Austrian Bundesliga	0	0	0	0	–		–		0	0
Austria Klagenfurt II (loan)	2022–23	Kärntner Liga	13	0	–		–		–		13	0
Grazer AK (loan)	2022–23	2. Liga	0	0	–		–		–		0	0
SV Ried (loan)	2023–24	2. Liga	0	0	0	0	–		–		0	0
SV Ried II (loan)	2023–24	Austrian Regionalliga Central	13	0	–		–		–		13	0
SV Horn	2024–25	2. Liga	14	0	1 (Note: Appearance in Austrian Cup)	0	–		–		15	0
Los Angeles FC 2	2025	MLS Next Pro	0	0	–		–		–		0	0
Career total			40	0	1	0	0	0	0	0	41	0
