= Daniel Francis (footballer, born 2003) =

Nigerian footballer

Personal information
- Date of birth: 27 September 2003 (age 23)
- Place of birth: Nigeria
- Height: 1.76 m (5 ft 9 in)
- Position: Midfielder

Team information
- Current team: FC Wacker Innsbruck
- Number: 4

Youth career
- –2022: Hearts of Abuja

Senior career*
Years	Team	Apps	(Gls)
2022–2023	Bayern Munich II	0	(0)
2022–2023	→ Austria Klagenfurt (loan)	0	(0)
2022–2023	→ Austria Klagenfurt II (loan)	10	(0)
2023–	FC Wacker Innsbruck	55	(3)

International career
2019	Nigeria U17	1	(0)
- * Club domestic league appearances and goals as of 26 June 2026

Daniel Francis (born 27 September 2003) is a Nigerian professional footballer who plays as a midfielder for 2. Liga club FC Wacker Innsbruck.

== Club career ==
Having played football in his native Nigeria with Hearts of Abuja, Francis took the opportunity to train at German Bundesliga club Bayern Munich's facilities in July and August 2021, after he was selected as one of the FC Bayern World Squad members. He had already had contact with the German side after playing at the Bayern Youth Cup in 2019, however, due to the COVID-19 pandemic in Nigeria, he was unable to sign at the time.

Following an impressive showing with the World Squad, in which he was named captain, he signed a three-year contract in August 2022. In signing for Bayern Munich, he became the Bavarian club's first ever Nigerian player. Immediately after signing, he was assigned for Bayern Munich II, the club's reserve team, and was subsequently loaned to affiliate club Austria Klagenfurt of the Austria Bundesliga, but only featured with their reserve team on the Kärntner Liga.

== International career ==
Francis has represented Nigeria at under-17 level.

== Career statistics ==
As of 16 October 2022

Club	Season	League			Cup		Continental		Other		Total	
Club	Season	Division	Apps	Goals	Apps	Goals	Apps	Goals	Apps	Goals	Apps	Goals
Bayern Munich	2022–23	Bundesliga	0	0	0	0	0	0	0	0	0	0
Austria Klagenfurt (loan)	2022–23	Austrian Bundesliga	0	0	0	0	—		0	0	0	0
Career total			0	0	0	0	0	0	0	0	0	0
