= Nick Salihamidžić =

German footballer (born 2003)

Personal information
- Full name: Nick Salihamidžić Copado
- Date of birth: 8 February 2003 (age 23)
- Place of birth: Munich, Germany
- Height: 1.79 m (5 ft 10 in)
- Position: Right-back

Youth career
- SpVgg Unterhaching
- 2015–2022: Bayern Munich

Senior career*
Years	Team	Apps	(Gls)
2022–2024	Bayern Munich II	2	(0)
2022	→ Whitecaps FC 2 (loan)	5	(0)
2023	→ Cosenza (loan)	0	(0)

International career^{‡}
2023	Bosnia and Herzegovina U21	1	(0)
- * Club domestic league appearances and goals as of 24 October 2022 ‡ National team caps and goals as of 28 March 2023

Nick Salihamidžić Copado (born 8 February 2003) is a professional footballer who plays as a right-back. Born in Germany, he represented the Bosnia and Herzegovina under-21 national team.

== Club career ==
Salihamidžić started his professional career with the reserve team of German Bundesliga club Bayern Munich. In 2022, he was sent on loan to MLS Next Pro club Whitecaps FC 2.

On 27 January 2023, Salihamidžić moved to Italy and joined Serie B club Cosenza, on a six-month loan.

== International career ==
In addition to Germany, Salihamidžić is also eligible to represent Bosnia and Herzegovina and Spain internationally through his parents. He was called up by Igor Janković to play for the Bosnia and Herzegovina U21 and made his debut in a friendly match against the China U21.

== Personal life ==
He is the son of former Bosnian international, UEFA Champions League winner, and former Bayern Munich sports director Hasan Salihamidžić. Nick is cousin of fellow German footballer Lucas Copado, both natives of Munich, they played together for Bayern Munich II and progressed through the youth teams.

== Career statistics ==
As of match played 26 August 2022

Appearances and goals by club, season and competition
Club	Season	League			National cup		Total	
Club	Season	Division	Apps	Goals	Apps	Goals	Apps	Goals
Bayern Munich II	2021–22	Regionalliga Bayern	2	0	—		2	0
Bayern Munich II	2022–23	Regionalliga Bayern	0	0	—		0	0
Bayern Munich II	2023–24	Regionalliga Bayern	0	0	—		0	0
Bayern Munich II	Total		2	0	—		2	0
Whitecaps FC 2 (loan)	2022	MLS Next Pro	5	0	—		5	0
Cosenza (loan)	2022–23	Serie B	0	0	—		0	0
Career total			7	0	0	0	7	0
