= 2018–19 AFC Ajax season =

Dutch football club season

Ajax
2018–19 season
- Owner: AFC Ajax N.V.
- CEO: Edwin van der Sar
- Manager: Erik ten Hag
- Stadium: Johan Cruyff Arena
- Eredivisie: 1st
- KNVB Cup: Winners
- UEFA Champions League: Semi-finals
- Top goalscorer: League: Dušan Tadić (28); All: Dušan Tadić (38)
- Highest home attendance: 53,720 vs Feyenoord (28 October 2018)
- Lowest home attendance: 43,819 vs Heerenveen (24 January 2019)
- Average home league attendance: 52,987
- Biggest win: 8–0 vs De Graafschap (16 December 2018)
- Biggest defeat: 2–6 vs Feyenoord (27 January 2019)
Home colours	Away colours

During the 2018–19 season, Ajax participated in the Eredivisie, the KNVB Cup and the UEFA Champions League. With winning both the competition and the cup, it meant the first double won since the 2001–02 season. In the Champions League, they knocked-out defending champions Real Madrid in the round of 16. After beating Juventus in the quarter-final, they reached a Champions League semi-final for the first time since 1997. Ajax were seconds away from reaching the final, until a last-minute goal sent Tottenham Hotspur to the final on away goals.

On an individual level, Dušan Tadić was the biggest surprise; signed from Southampton in June 2018 for just €11.4 million, the 30-year old unexpectedly became the club's leading goalscorer with a total of 38, including 9 goals in the Champions League. He doubled his personal season record for scoring, as well as earned the right to be the team's captain for the next season.

== Player statistics ==

4–2–3–1 formation, known as the "Tadic-variant", as used in the successful Champions League campaign where they reached the semi-finals for the first time since 1997 after beating European giants Real Madrid and Juventus.

Appearances for competitive matches only

No.	Pos	Nat	Player	Total		Eredivisie		KNVB Cup		UEFA Champions League	
No.	Pos	Nat	Player	Apps	Goals	Apps	Goals	Apps	Goals	Apps	Goals
2	DF	(Denmark) DEN	Rasmus Kristensen	19	1	5+7	0	5	1	0+2	0
3	DF	(Netherlands) NED	Joël Veltman	14	1	4+5	1	0	0	3+2	0
4	DF	(Netherlands) NED	Matthijs de Ligt	55	7	33	3	3+2	1	17	3
6	MF	(Netherlands) NED	Donny van de Beek	56	17	28+5	9	5	4	14+4	4
7	FW	(Brazil) BRA	David Neres	50	12	20+9	8	4+2	1	14+1	3
8	DF	(Netherlands) NED	Daley Sinkgraven	11	0	1+8	0	0	0	0+2	0
9	FW	(Netherlands) NED	Klaas-Jan Huntelaar	42	23	13+15	16	4	3	7+3	4
10	MF	(Serbia) SRB	Dušan Tadić	56	38	34	28	4	1	17+1	9
12	MF	(Morocco) MAR	Noussair Mazraoui	47	4	26+2	1	3	1	16	2
15	MF	(Netherlands) NED	Carel Eiting	13	0	4+2	0	2	0	3+2	0
16	DF	(Argentina) ARG	Lisandro Magallán	5	0	1+1	0	1	0	0+2	0
17	DF	(Netherlands) NED	Daley Blind	57	6	34	5	5	1	16+2	0
18	FW	(Burkina Faso) BFA	Hassane Bandé	0	0	0	0	0	0	0	0
19	MF	(Morocco) MAR	Zakaria Labyad	19	4	2+9	1	3+2	3	0+3	0
20	MF	(Denmark) DEN	Lasse Schöne	51	6	27+3	5	2+2	0	17	1
21	MF	(Netherlands) NED	Frenkie de Jong	51	3	29+1	3	4	0	17	0
22	MF	(Morocco) MAR	Hakim Ziyech	49	21	29	16	3	0	17	5
23	FW	(Burkina Faso) BFA	Lassina Traoré	1	0	0+1	0	0	0	0	0
24	GK	(Cameroon) CMR	André Onana	55	0	33	0	3+1	0	18	0
25	FW	(Denmark) DEN	Kasper Dolberg	38	12	16+9	11	1+3	1	3+6	0
26	GK	(Greece) GRE	Kostas Lamprou	5	0	1+1	0	3	0	0	0
27	DF	(Netherlands) NED	Perr Schuurs	4	1	0+1	0	3	1	0	0
28	GK	(Portugal) POR	Bruno Varela	0	0	0	0	0	0	0	0
30	MF	(Netherlands) NED	Dani de Wit	12	0	1+4	0	0+3	0	0+4	0
31	DF	(Argentina) ARG	Nicolás Tagliafico	46	6	29	2	2	1	15	3
32	MF	(Czech Republic) CZE	Václav Černý	3	0	0	0	1+2	0	0	0
35	DF	(Netherlands) NED	Mitchel Bakker	2	0	0	0	2	0	0	0
37	MF	(Netherlands) NED	Noa Lang	4	0	0+3	0	0+1	0	0	0
38	MF	(Netherlands) NED	Ryan Gravenberch	2	1	0+1	0	1	1	0	0
40	MF	(Netherlands) NED	Jurgen Ekkelenkamp	5	1	0+3	0	0+1	1	0+1	0
Players sold or loaned out after the start of the season:
5	DF	(Austria) AUT	Maximilian Wöber	16	0	4+4	0	2	0	4+2	0
16	GK	(Netherlands) NED	Benjamin van Leer	0	0	0	0	0	0	0	0
23	MF	(Netherlands) NED	Siem de Jong	0	0	0	0	0	0	0	0
28	DF	(Colombia) COL	Luis Manuel Orejuela	0	0	0	0	0	0	0	0
39	FW	(Netherlands) NED	Kaj Sierhuis	3	0	1+1	0	0	0	0+1	0
41	FW	(Norway) NOR	Dennis Johnsen	1	0	0+1	0	0	0	0	0

As of 15 May 2019

== Team statistics ==
=== 2018–19 selection by nationality ===
Nationality	(Netherlands)	(Morocco)	(Denmark)	(Argentina)	(Brazil)	(Burkina Faso)	(Cameroon)	(Czech Republic)	(Greece)	(Portugal)	(Serbia)	(South Africa)	(Australia)	(Croatia)	(Finland)	(Germany)	(Colombia)	(Norway)	Total Players
Current squad selection	9	3	3	2	1	1	1	1	1	1	1	-	-	-	-	-	-	-	25
Youth/reserves squad in AFC Ajax selection	14	2	1	-	1	1	-	-	-	-	-	1	2	1	1	1	-	-	24
Players out on loan	3	-	-	-	-	-	-	1	-	-	-	-	-	-	-	-	2	1	7

=== Eredivisie standings 2018–19 ===
Current standing	Matches played	Wins	Draws	Losses	Points	Goals for	Goals against	Yellow cards (yellow card)	Red cards (red card)
1	34	28	2	4	86	119	32	35	2

Match day	1	2	3	4	5	6	7	8	9	10	11	12	13	14	15	19	17	18	19	20	21	22	23	24	25	26	27	28	29	30	31	32	33	34	Total
Points by match day	1	3	3	3	3	0	3	3	3	3	3	3	3	3	3	3	3	1	0	3	0	3	3	3	3	0	3	3	3	3	3	3	3	3	86
Total points by match day	1	4	7	10	13	13	16	19	22	25	28	31	34	37	40	43	46	47	47	50	50	53	56	59	62	62	65	68	71	74	77	80	83	86	86
Standing by match day	10	6	3	2	2	2	2	2	2	2	2	2	2	2	2	2	2	2	2	2	2	2	2	2	2	2	2	2	1	1	1	1	1	1	1
Goals by match day	1	1	5	4	3	0	2	5	4	3	2	7	3	5	4	8	3	4	2	6	0	5	5	4	2	0	3	5	4	6	1	4	4	4	119
Goals against per match day	1	0	0	0	0	3	0	0	0	0	0	1	0	1	1	0	1	4	6	0	1	0	1	0	1	1	1	2	1	2	0	2	1	1	32
Total goal difference per match day	±0	+1	+6	+10	+13	+10	+12	+17	+21	+24	+26	+32	+35	+39	+42	+50	+52	+52	+48	+54	+53	+58	+62	+66	+67	+66	+68	+71	+74	+78	+79	+81	+84	+87	+87

==== Topscorers ====
Eredivisie

Nr.	Name	Goal
1.	(Serbia) Dušan Tadić	28
2.	(Netherlands) Klaas-Jan Huntelaar	16
2.	(Morocco) Hakim Ziyech	16
4.	(Denmark) Kasper Dolberg	11
5.	(Netherlands) Donny van de Beek	9
6.	(Brazil) David Neres	8
7.	(Netherlands) Daley Blind	5
7.	(Denmark) Lasse Schöne	5
9.	(Netherlands) Frenkie de Jong	3
9.	(Netherlands) Matthijs de Ligt	3
11.	(Argentina) Nicolás Tagliafico	2
12.	(Morocco) Zakaria Labyad	1
12.	(Morocco) Noussair Mazraoui	1
12.	(Netherlands) Joël Veltman	1
Own goal	(Netherlands) Pelle van Amersfoort (Heerenveen)	1
Own goal	(Netherlands) Glenn Bijl (Emmen)	1
Own goal	(Netherlands) Justin Bijlow (Feyenoord)	1
Own goal	(Netherlands) Freek Heerkens (Willem II)	1
Own goal	(Curaçao) Gervane Kastaneer (NAC Breda)	1
Own goal	(Netherlands) Jethro Mashart (NAC Breda)	1
Own goal	(United States) Erik Palmer-Brown (NAC Breda)	1
Own goal	(Netherlands) Ricardo van Rhijn (AZ Alkmaar)	1
Own goal	(Germany) Daniel Schwaab (PSV Eindhoven)	1
	Total	119

KNVB Cup

Nr.	Name	Goal
1.	(Netherlands) Donny van de Beek	4
2.	(Netherlands) Klaas-Jan Huntelaar	3
2.	(Morocco) Zakaria Labyad	3
4.	(Netherlands) Daley Blind	1
4.	(Denmark) Kasper Dolberg	1
4.	(Netherlands) Jurgen Ekkelenkamp	1
4.	(Netherlands) Ryan Gravenberch	1
4.	(Denmark) Rasmus Kristensen	1
4.	(Netherlands) Matthijs de Ligt	1
4.	(Morocco) Noussair Mazraoui	1
4.	(Brazil) David Neres	1
4.	(Netherlands) Perr Schuurs	1
4.	(Serbia) Dušan Tadić	1
4.	(Argentina) Nicolás Tagliafico	1
	Total	21

UEFA Champions League

Nr.	Name	Goal
1.	(Serbia) Dušan Tadić	9
2.	(Morocco) Hakim Ziyech	5
3.	(Netherlands) Donny van de Beek	4
3.	(Netherlands) Klaas-Jan Huntelaar	4
5.	(Netherlands) Matthijs de Ligt	3
5.	(Brazil) David Neres	3
5.	(Argentina) Nicolás Tagliafico	3
8.	(Morocco) Noussair Mazraoui	2
8.	(Denmark) Lasse Schöne	2
	Total	35

== Competitions ==
=== Overview ===
Competition	First match	Last match	Starting round	Final position	Record							
Competition	First match	Last match	Starting round	Final position	Pld	W	D	L	GF	GA	GD	Win %
Eredivisie	11 August 2018	15 May 2019	Matchday 1	Winners	34	28	2	4	119	32	+87	82.35
KNVB Cup	26 September 2018	5 May 2019	First round	Winners	6	5	1	0	21	2	+19	83.33
Champions League	25 July 2018	8 May 2019	Second qualifying round	Semi-finals	18	10	6	2	35	17	+18	55.56
Total					58	43	9	6	175	51	+124	74.14

Last updated: 15 May 2019
Source: Competitions

=== Eredivisie ===
==== League table ====
Pos	Team	Pld	W	D	L	GF	GA	GD	Pts	Qualification or relegation
1	Ajax (C)	34	28	2	4	119	32	+87	86	Qualification for the Champions League third qualifying round
2	PSV Eindhoven	34	26	5	3	98	26	+72	83	Qualification for the Champions League second qualifying round
3	Feyenoord	34	20	5	9	75	41	+34	65	Qualification for the Europa League third qualifying round (Note: Since the winners of the 2018–19 KNVB Cup, Ajax, qualified for European competition based on league position, the spot awarded to the KNVB Cup winners (Europa League third qualifying round) was passed to the third-placed team and the spot awarded to the third-placed team (Europa League second qualifying round) was passed to the fourth-placed team.)
4	AZ	34	17	7	10	64	43	+21	58	Qualification for the Europa League second qualifying round
5	Vitesse	34	14	11	9	70	51	+19	53	Qualification for the European competition play-offs (Note: Four teams play for a spot in the 2019–20 UEFA Europa League second qualifying round.)

Source: eredivisie.nl
Rules for classification: Season in progress: 1) Most points won; 2) Less points lost; 3) Goal difference; 4) Goals scored; 5) Alphabetical order; End of season: 1) Points; 2) Goal difference; 3) Goals scored; 4) Head-to-head points; 5) Head-to-head goal difference; 6) Head-to-head away goals scored; 7) Play-off if relevant for deciding champion, relegation or participating in a European league, otherwise by draw. 8) Penalty shoot-out (only after a play-off)
(C) Champions
Notes:

Ten teams, two from the Eredivisie and eight from the Eerste Divisie, played for two spots in the 2019–20 Eredivisie, the remaining eight teams playing in the 2019–20 Eerste Divisie.

First round
NEC	2	0	2
RKC Waalwijk	0	3	3
SC Cambuur	2	2	4
Almere City	2	1	3

Second round
RKC Waalwijk	2	1	3
Excelsior	1	1	2
Go Ahead Eagles	2	1	3
FC Den Bosch	2	0	2
TOP Oss	0	0	0
Sparta Rotterdam	2	3	5
SC Cambuur	1	0	1
De Graafschap	1	2	3

Third round
RKC Waalwijk*	0	5	5
Go Ahead Eagles	0	4	4
Sparta Rotterdam*	1	2	3
De Graafschap	2	0	2

Key: * = Play-off winners, (a) = Wins because of away goals rule, (e) = Wins after extra time in second leg, (p) = Wins after penalty shoot-out.

==== Matches ====
11 August 2018 1	Ajax	1–1	Heracles Almelo	Amsterdam
18:30 CEST	De Ligt 88'	Report	Duarte (yellow card) 65'; Peterson 84', (yellow card) 90+4'; Breukers (yellow card) 90+3'	Stadium: Johan Cruyff Arena; Attendance: 51,949; Referee: Serdar Gözübüyük

18 August 2018 2	VVV-Venlo	0–1	Ajax	Venlo
18:30 CEST		Report	Tadić 88' (pen.); Onana (yellow card) 90+4'	Stadium: De Koel; Attendance: 8,000; Referee: Kevin Blom

25 August 2018 3	Ajax	5–0	Emmen	Amsterdam
18:39 CEST	Ziyech 8'; Huntelaar 38', 59'; Tadić 71'; Bijl 86' (o.g.)	Report	Siekman (yellow card) 41'	Stadium: Johan Cruyff Arena; Attendance: 52,885; Referee: Bas Nijhuis

2 September 2018 4	Vitesse	0–4	Ajax	Arnhem
14:30 CEST	Bero (yellow card) 14'; Foor (yellow card) 22'; Linssen (yellow card) 42'	Report	Ziyech 3'; Huntelaar 7', 58'; Tadić 19'	Stadium: GelreDome; Attendance: 19,231; Referee: Pol van Boekel

15 September 2018 5	Ajax	3–0	Groningen	Amsterdam
20:45 CEST	Huntelaar 18' (pen.), 66'; Tagliafico (yellow card) 29'; Schöne (yellow card) 35'; Tadić 76'	Report		Stadium: Johan Cruyff Arena; Attendance: 52,720; Referee: Dennis Higler

23 September 2018 6	PSV	3–0	Ajax	Eindhoven
16:45 CEST	Lozano (yellow card) 20', (goal) 35'; Pereiro 21', (yellow card) 27'; De Jong 24', (yellow card) 62'	Report	Tadić (yellow card) 19'; Ziyech (yellow card) 77'	Stadium: Philips Stadion; Attendance: 35,000; Referee: Danny Makkelie

29 September 2018 7	Fortuna Sittard	0–2	Ajax	Sittard
20:45 CEST	Smeets (yellow card) 73'; Rodríguez (yellow card) 80'	Report	Huntelaar (yellow card) 26'; Dolberg 49'; Schöne (yellow card) 73'; Ziyech 78'	Stadium: Fortuna Sittard Stadion; Attendance: 12,004; Referee: Jeroen Manschot

7 October 2018 8	Ajax	5–0	AZ	Amsterdam
16:45 CEST	Van de Beek 3'; Dolberg 48'; Van Rhijn 52' (o.g.); Ziyech 61'; Huntelaar (yellow card) 67'; Tagliafico (yellow card) 83'; Tadić 84'	Report	Idrissi (yellow card) 30'; Vejinović (yellow card) 46'; Hatzidiakos (yellow card) 67'	Stadium: Johan Cruyff Arena; Attendance: 53,185; Referee: Dennis Higler

20 October 2018 9	Heerenveen	0–4	Ajax	Heerenveen
20:45 CEST	Thorsby (yellow card) 44'; Høegh (yellow card) 50'	Report	Schöne 3'; Ziyech 42'; Tadić 52' (pen.); Dolberg 56'; Neres (yellow card) 71'	Stadium: Abe Lenstra Stadion; Attendance: 23,315; Referee: Pol van Boekel

28 October 2018 10	Ajax	3–0	Feyenoord	Amsterdam
14:30 CET	Bijlow 22' (o.g.); Ziyech 41'; Mazraoui (yellow card) 50'; Tadić 80'	Report	Toornstra (yellow card) 3'; St. Juste (red card) 6'; Berghuis (yellow card) 14'	Stadium: Johan Cruyff Arena; Attendance: 53,720; Referee: Björn Kuipers

3 November 2018 11	Ajax	2–0	Willem II	Amsterdam
18:30 CET	Dolberg 11'; De Jong 22'	Report	Sol (yellow card) 33'	Stadium: Johan Cruyff Arena; Attendance: 53,432; Referee: Allard Lindhout

11 November 2018 12	Excelsior	1–7	Ajax	Rotterdam
14:30 CET	Fortes (yellow card) 25'; Haspolat (yellow card) 25'; Matthys (yellow card) 43'; Messaoud 52'	Report	Van de Beek 31', 48'; Schöne 44'; Dolberg 59'; Schouten 71' (o.g.); Ziyech 79'; Neres 87'	Stadium: Van Donge & De Roo Stadion; Attendance: 4,400; Referee: Serdar Gözübüyük

24 November 2018 13	NAC Breda	0–3	Ajax	Breda
20:45 CET	Klomp (yellow card) 38'; Verschueren (yellow card) 41'; Nijholt (yellow card) 68'; Te Vrede (yellow card) 71'	Report	Mashart 40' (o.g.); Labyad 54', (yellow card) 67'; Huntelaar 90+3'	Stadium: Rat Verlegh Stadion; Attendance: 18,969; Referee: Dennis Higler

2 December 2018 14	Ajax	5–1	ADO Den Haag	Amsterdam
12:15 CET	Neres 15'; Tagliafico 21'; De Ligt 43'; Van de Beek 48'; Dolberg 83'	Report	Meijers 39'	Stadium: Johan Cruyff Arena; Attendance: 53,644; Referee: Pol van Boekel

8 December 2018 15	PEC Zwolle	1–4	Ajax	Zwolle
20:45 CET	Schöne 44' (o.g.); Van Duinen (yellow card) 45+1'; Genreau (yellow card) 68'	Report	De Ligt (yellow card) 6'; Huntelaar 22'; Tagliafico (yellow card) 25'; De Jong 32'; Tadić (yellow card) 59', (goal) 89'; Schöne 69'	Stadium: MAC³PARK Stadion; Attendance: 14,000; Referee: Jochem Kamphuis

16 December 2018 16	Ajax	8–0	De Graafschap	Amsterdam
14:30 CET	Tadić 18'; Mazraoui 25'; Ziyech 32', 62', 69'; Blind 65', 74', 90'	Report	Van de Pavert (yellow card) 67'	Stadium: Johan Cruyff Arena; Attendance: 53,388; Referee: Kevin Blom

23 December 2018 17	Utrecht	1–3	Ajax	Utrecht
12:15 CET	Tannane (yellow card) 31'; Janssen (yellow card) 59'; Venema 74'	Report	Dolberg 14'; Wöber (yellow card) 29'; Tadić 60' (pen.); Onana (yellow card) 80'; De Jong 90+5'	Stadium: Stadion Galgenwaard; Attendance: 23,226; Referee: Dennis Higler

20 January 2019 18	Ajax	4–4	Heerenveen	Amsterdam
16:45 CET	Tadić 13', 16', (penalty missed) 45+1'; Van Amersfoort 28' (o.g.); Huntelaar 83'	Report	Lammers 14', 51'; Van Bergen 56'; Pierie 90+1'; Bruijn (yellow card) 90+3'	Stadium: Johan Cruyff Arena; Attendance: 52,553; Referee: Serdar Gözübüyük

27 January 2019 19	Feyenoord	6–2	Ajax	Rotterdam
14:30 CET	Toornstra 16'; Berghuis 31'; Van Persie 42', 56'; Vilhena 75'; Ayoub 84'	Report	Schöne 8'; Ziyech 33'	Stadium: De Kuip; Attendance: 47,500; Referee: Danny Makkelie

2 February 2019 20	Ajax	6–0	VVV-Venlo	Amsterdam
19:45 CET	Ziyech 35'; Dolberg 52'; Tadić 60'; Neres 85'; Huntelaar 87'; Van de Beek 90+1'	Report	Mlapa (yellow card) 36'	Stadium: Johan Cruyff Arena; Attendance: 52,868; Referee: Allard Lindhout

9 February 2019 21	Heracles Almelo	1–0	Ajax	Almelo
18:30 CET	Kuwas (penalty missed) 6'; Osman 17'; Rossmann (yellow card) 81'	Report	Huntelaar (yellow card) 41'	Stadium: Polman Stadion; Attendance: 12,080; Referee: Dennis Higler

17 February 2019 22	Ajax	5–0	NAC Breda	Amsterdam
12:15 CET	Tadić 38' (pen.), 67'; Dolberg 53'; Kastaneer 59' (o.g.); Ziyech (yellow card) 65'; Palmer-Brown 71' (o.g.)	Report	Nijholt (yellow card) 36'; Dervite (yellow card) 38'; Koch (yellow card) 90+1'	Stadium: Johan Cruyff Arena; Attendance: 52,952; Referee: Siemen Mulder

24 February 2019 23	ADO Den Haag	1–5	Ajax	The Hague
12:15 CET	El Khayati 36'; Meijers (yellow card) 45'	Report	Van de Beek 39'; Tadić 45+1' (pen.); Neres (yellow card) 55'; Ziyech 74', 83'; Dolberg 78'	Stadium: Cars Jeans Stadion; Attendance: 14,352; Referee: Jeroen Manschot

10 March 2019 25	Ajax	4–0	Fortuna Sittard	Amsterdam
16:45 CET	Tadić 4', 85'; Neres 27', 63'	Report		Stadium: Johan Cruyff Arena; Attendance: 53,381; Referee: Jochem Kamphuis

13 March 2019 24	Ajax	2–1	PEC Zwolle	Amsterdam
18:30 CET	Tadić 32', (yellow card) 86'; Blind 85'; Veltman (yellow card) 90+2'	Report	Van Crooy 79', (yellow card) 25' (yellow-red card) 90'; Lam (yellow card) 86'	Stadium: Johan Cruyff Arena; Attendance: 52,385; Referee: Allard Lindhout

17 March 2019 26	AZ	1–0	Ajax	Alkmaar
14:30 CET	Til 56'	Report	Dolberg (yellow card) 64'	Stadium: AFAS Stadion; Attendance: 17,023; Referee: Serdar Gözübüyük

31 March 2019 27	Ajax	3–1	PSV	Amsterdam
16:45 CEST	Schwaab 21' (o.g.); Mazraoui (red card) 57'; Tadić (yellow card) 68', (goal) 72' (pen.); Onana (yellow card) 90+2'; Neres 90+6', (yellow card) 90+7'	Report	Sadílek (yellow card) 54'; De Jong 58'; Malen (yellow card) 73'	Stadium: Johan Cruyff Arena; Attendance: 52,669; Referee: Björn Kuipers

3 April 2019 28	Emmen	2–5	Ajax	Emmen
14:30 CEST	Bannik (yellow card) 28'; Kuipers (yellow card) 50'; Tagliafico 62' (o.g.); Arias 87'	Report	Van de Beek 9'; Kristensen (yellow card) 24'; Blind 43'; Neres 51', 60'; Huntelaar 53'	Stadium: De Oude Meerdijk; Attendance: 8,301; Referee: Siemen Mulder

6 April 2019 29	Willem II	1–4	Ajax	Tilburg
18:30 CEST	Crowley (yellow card) 13'; Isak 26' (pen.); Lewis (yellow card) 29'	Report	Van de Beek 14'; Heerkens 41' (o.g.); Veltman 53'; Ziyech 70'	Stadium: Koning Willem II Stadion; Attendance: 14,700; Referee: Danny Makkelie

13 April 2019 30	Ajax	6–2	Excelsior	Amsterdam
18:30 CEST	Mazraoui (yellow card) 4'; Huntelaar 10', 40', 65'; Tadić 37', 60' (pen.); Dolberg 75'; Ekkelenkamp (yellow card) 84'	Report	Fortes (yellow card) 32', (goal) 89'; El Hamdaoui 42', (yellow card) 49'; Koolwijk (yellow card) 43'	Stadium: Johan Cruyff Arena; Attendance: 52,664; Referee: Pol van Boekel

20 April 2019 31	Groningen	0–1	Ajax	Groningen
18:30 CEST	Gladon (yellow card) 28'; Memišević (yellow card) 73'; Reis (yellow card) 75'; Chabot (yellow card) 76'	Report	Veltman (yellow card) 73'; Huntelaar 78', (yellow card) 79' (yellow-red card) 84'	Stadium: Noordlease Stadion; Attendance: 22,288; Referee: Dennis Higler

23 April 2019 32	Ajax	4–2	Vitesse	Amsterdam
20:45 CEST	Ziyech 41'; Tadić 54' (pen.), 80' (pen.); De Ligt 58'; Veltman (yellow card) 69'; Van de Beek (yellow card) 86'	Report	Bero (yellow card) 53' (yellow-red card) 90+1'; Foor 66'; Van der Werff (yellow card) 80'; Darfalou 82'	Stadium: Johan Cruyff Arena; Attendance: 52,869; Referee: Jochem Kamphuis

12 May 2019 34	Ajax	4–1	Utrecht	Amsterdam
14:30 CEST	Huntelaar 14'; Van de Beek 45+1'; Tagliafico (yellow card) 60'; Tadić 75', 80' (pen.)	Report	Boussaid 1'; Bazoer (yellow card) 7'; Letschert (yellow card) 36'; Janssen (yellow card) 40'; Van de Streek (yellow card) 54'	Stadium: Johan Cruyff Arena; Attendance: 53,520; Referee: Pol van Boekel

15 May 2019 33	De Graafschap	1–4	Ajax	Doetinchem
19:30 CEST	El Jebli 40'; Matusiwa (yellow card) 66'	Report	Schöne 37'; Tagliafico 44'; Tadić 67' (pen.), 87'	Stadium: De Vijverberg; Attendance: 12,600; Referee: Danny Makkelie

=== KNVB Cup ===
26 September 2018 Round 1	HVV Te Werve	0–7	Ajax	Rijswijk
19:45 CEST		Report	Schuurs 10'; Dolberg 17'; Van de Beek 30'; Labyad 38', 59'; Ekkelenkamp 66'; Gravenberch 82'	Stadium: Sportpark Vredenburgh; Attendance: 3,500; Referee: Christiaan Bax

31 October 2018 Round 2	Ajax	3–0	Go Ahead Eagles	Amsterdam
19:45 CET	Neres 35'; Labyad 39'; Huntelaar 63'; Schuurs (yellow card) 81'	Report		Stadium: Johan Cruyff Arena; Attendance: 43,884; Referee: Kevin Blom

19 December 2018 Round of 16	Roda JC Kerkrade	1–1 (a.e.t.) (2–4 p)	Ajax	Kerkrade
20:45 CET	Paulissen 36' (pen.); Engels (yellow card) 102'	Report	Tadić 13' (pen.)	Stadium: Parkstad Limburg Stadion; Attendance: 14,296; Referee: Serdar Gözübüyük
	Penalties
	Engels (penalty missed); Paulissen (penalty missed); Gnjatić (penalty scored); Verburgh (penalty scored)		(penalty scored) Tadić; (penalty scored) Huntelaar; (penalty missed) De Ligt; (penalty scored) Dolberg; (penalty scored) Blind

24 January 2019 Quarter-final	Ajax	3–1	Heerenveen	Amsterdam
20:45 CET	Mazraoui 3'; Van de Beek 16', 38'; Magallán (yellow card) 88'	Report	Vlapp (yellow card) 52'; Van Amersfoort 84'; Lammers (penalty missed) 89'	Stadium: Johan Cruyff Arena; Attendance: 43,819; Referee: Kevin Blom

27 February 2019 Semi-final	Feyenoord	0–3	Ajax	Rotterdam
20:45 CET	Van der Heijden (yellow card) 28'; St. Juste (yellow card) 56'; Berghuis (yellow card) 77'	Report	Van de Beek (yellow card) 12', (goal) 65'; De Ligt 45'; Tagliafico 49'; De Jong (yellow card) 61'; Mazraoui (yellow card) 67'; De Wit (yellow card) 90+2'	Stadium: De Kuip; Attendance: 47,500; Referee: Kevin Blom

5 May 2019 Final	Willem II	0–4	Ajax	Rotterdam
18:00 CEST	Llonch (yellow card) 78'	Report	Blind 38'; Huntelaar 39', 67'; Kristensen 76'	Stadium: De Kuip; Attendance: 45,709; Referee: Serdar Gözübüyük

=== UEFA Champions League ===
==== Second qualifying round ====
25 July 2018 First leg	Ajax (Netherlands)	2–0	(Austria) Sturm Graz	Amsterdam, Netherlands
20:30 CEST	Ziyech 15'; Schöne (penalty missed) 57', 57'	Report	Koch (yellow card) 40'; Lackner (yellow card) 79'	Stadium: Amsterdam Arena; Attendance: 53,106; Referee: Alejandro Hernández Hernández (Spain)

1 August 2018 Second leg	Sturm Graz (Austria)	1–3 (1–5 agg.)	(Netherlands) Ajax	Graz, Austria
20:30 CEST	Ferreira (yellow card) 60'; Koch (yellow card) 64'; Lovrić (yellow card) 71'; Onana 89' (o.g.)	Report	Tagliafico (yellow card) 33'; Huntelaar 39', 77'; Tadić 48'	Stadium: Liebenauer Stadium; Attendance: 15,172; Referee: Bartosz Frankowski (Poland)

==== Third qualifying round ====
7 August 2018 First leg	Standard Liège (Belgium)	2–2	(Netherlands) Ajax	Liège, Belgium
20:00 CEST	Fai (yellow card) 55'; Carcela 67'; Emond 90+4' (pen.)	Report	Huntelaar 19'; Tadić 34'; Tagliafico (yellow card) 58'; Ziyech (yellow card) 61'	Stadium: Stade Maurice Dufrasne; Attendance: 20,355; Referee: Tobias Stieler (Germany)

14 August 2018 Second leg	Ajax (Netherlands)	3–0 (5–2 agg.)	(Belgium) Standard Liège	Amsterdam, Netherlands
20:30 CEST	Huntelaar 30'; De Ligt 34'; Neres 46'	Report	M'Poku (yellow card) 76'	Stadium: Johan Cruyff Arena; Attendance: 51,841; Referee: Ivan Kružliak (Slovakia)

==== Play-off round ====
22 August 2018 First leg	Ajax (Netherlands)	3–1	(Ukraine) Dynamo Kyiv	Amsterdam, Netherlands
21:00 CEST	Van de Beek 2'; Huntelaar (yellow card) 21'; Ziyech 35'; Tadić 43'; Tagliafico (yellow card) 70'	Report	Kędziora 16', (yellow card) 24'; Harmash (yellow card) 38'	Stadium: Johan Cruyff Arena; Attendance: 52,706; Referee: Clément Turpin (France)

28 August 2018 Second leg	Dynamo Kyiv (Ukraine)	0–0 (1–3 agg.)	(Netherlands) Ajax	Kyiv, Ukraine
21:00 CEST	Kędziora (yellow card) 14'; Sydorchuk (yellow card) 54'; Shaparenko (yellow card) 70'	Report	Tadić (penalty missed) 14', (yellow card) 87'; Ziyech (yellow card) 34'	Stadium: Olimpiyskiy National Sports Complex; Attendance: 40,131; Referee: Damir Skomina (Slovenia)

==== Group stage ====
Pos	Team	Pld	W	D	L	GF	GA	GD	Pts	Qualification	BAY	AJX	BEN	AEK
1	(Germany) Bayern Munich	6	4	2	0	15	5	+10	14	Advance to knockout phase	—	1–1	5–1	2–0
2	(Netherlands) Ajax	6	3	3	0	11	5	+6	12	Advance to knockout phase	3–3	—	1–0	3–0
3	(Portugal) Benfica	6	2	1	3	6	11	−5	7	Transfer to Europa League	0–2	1–1	—	1–0
4	(Greece) AEK Athens	6	0	0	6	2	13	−11	0		0–2	0–2	2–3	—

Source: UEFA
Rules for classification: Group stage tiebreakers

19 September 2018 1	Ajax (Netherlands)	3–0	(Greece) AEK Athens	Amsterdam, Netherlands
18:55 CEST	Tagliafico 46', 90', (yellow card) 88'; De Jong (yellow card) 74'; Ziyech (yellow card) 74'; Van de Beek 77'	Report	Alef (yellow card) 72'; Mantalos (yellow card) 74'	Stadium: Johan Cruyff Arena; Attendance: 52,258; Referee: Carlos del Cerro Grande (Spain)

2 October 2018 2	Bayern Munich (Germany)	1–1	(Netherlands) Ajax	Munich, Germany
21:00 CEST	Hummels 4'; Martínez (yellow card) 40'; Rodríguez (yellow card) 78'; Gnabry (yellow card) 88'	Report	Van de Beek (yellow card) 21'; Mazraoui 22'; Blind (yellow card) 51'	Stadium: Allianz Arena; Attendance: 70,000; Referee: Pavel Královec (Czech Republic)

23 October 2018 3	Ajax (Netherlands)	1–0	(Portugal) Benfica	Amsterdam, Netherlands
21:00 CEST	Mazraoui (yellow card) 22', (goal) 90+2'; Onana (yellow card) 39'; Tagliafico (yellow card) 49'	Report	Jardel (yellow card) 9'; Conti (yellow card) 64'; Salvio (yellow card) 72'; Seferovic (yellow card) 86'	Stadium: Johan Cruyff Arena; Attendance: 53,379; Referee: Ruddy Buquet (France)

7 November 2018 4	Benfica (Portugal)	1–1	(Netherlands) Ajax	Lisbon, Portugal
21:00 CET	Jonas 29', (yellow card) 39'; Fejsa (yellow card) 45+1'; Jardel (yellow card) 70'	Report	Tagliafico (yellow card) 34'; De Ligt (yellow card) 42'; Tadić 61', (yellow card) 83'; Van de Beek (yellow card) 72'	Stadium: Estádio da Luz; Attendance: 51,328; Referee: Gianluca Rocchi (Italy)

27 November 2018 5	AEK Athens (Greece)	0–2	(Netherlands) Ajax	Athens, Greece
18:55 CET	Oikonomou (yellow card) 29'; Chyhrynskyi (yellow card) 51'; Livaja (yellow card) 53' (yellow-red card) 67'; Giakoumakis (yellow card) 90'	Report	Schöne (yellow card) 19'; Mazraoui (yellow card) 60'; Tadić 68' (pen.), 72'	Stadium: Olympic Stadium; Attendance: 25,756; Referee: Michael Oliver (England)

12 December 2018 6	Ajax (Netherlands)	3–3	(Germany) Bayern Munich	Amsterdam, Netherlands
21:00 CET	De Ligt (yellow card) 40'; Tadić 61', 82' (pen.); Blind (yellow card) 63'; Wöber (red card) 67'; Tagliafico 90+5', (yellow card) 90+5'	Report	Lewandowski 13', 87' (pen.); Kimmich (yellow card) 28'; Rafinha (yellow card) 37'; Müller (red card) 75'; Coman 90'	Stadium: Johan Cruyff Arena; Attendance: 52,244; Referee: Clément Turpin (France)

==== Knockout phase ====
===== Round of 16 =====
13 February 2019 First leg	Ajax (Netherlands)	1–2	(Spain) Real Madrid	Amsterdam, Netherlands
21:00 CET	Ziyech (yellow card) 53', (goal) 75'	Report	Benzema 60'; Reguilón (yellow card) 70'; Vázquez (yellow card) 83'; Asensio 87'; Ramos (yellow card) 90'	Stadium: Johan Cruyff Arena; Attendance: 52,286; Referee: Damir Skomina (Slovenia)

5 March 2019 Second leg	Real Madrid (Spain)	1–4 (3–5 agg.)	(Netherlands) Ajax	Madrid, Spain
21:00 CET	Carvajal (yellow card) 30'; Asensio 70'; Nacho (yellow card) 90+3' (yellow-red card) 90+3'	Report	Ziyech 7'; Neres 18'; Mazraoui (yellow card) 26'; Tadić 62'; Schöne 72'	Stadium: Santiago Bernabéu; Attendance: 77,013; Referee: Felix Brych (Germany)

===== Quarter-finals =====
10 April 2019 First leg	Ajax (Netherlands)	1–1	(Italy) Juventus	Amsterdam, Netherlands
21:00 CEST	Tagliafico (yellow card) 41'; Neres 46'; De Jong (yellow card) 55'; Schöne (yellow card) 71'; Ekkelenkamp (yellow card) 90+4'	Report	Ronaldo 45'; Pjanić (yellow card) 83'	Stadium: Johan Cruyff Arena; Attendance: 50,390; Referee: Carlos del Cerro Grande (Spain)

16 April 2019 Second leg	Juventus (Italy)	1–2 (2–3 agg.)	(Netherlands) Ajax	Turin, Italy
21:00 CEST	Ronaldo 28', (yellow card) 90+3'; Can (yellow card) 69'	Report	Van de Beek 34'; De Ligt 67'	Stadium: Juventus Stadium; Attendance: 41,445; Referee: Clément Turpin (France)

===== Semi-finals =====
30 April 2019 First leg	Tottenham Hotspur (England)	0–1	(Netherlands) Ajax	London, England
21:00 CEST		Report	Van de Beek 15'; Tagliafico (yellow card) 30'; Veltman (yellow card) 63'	Stadium: Tottenham Hotspur Stadium; Attendance: 60,243; Referee: Antonio Mateu Lahoz (Spain)

8 May 2019 Second leg	Ajax (Netherlands)	2–3 (3–3 (a) agg.)	(England) Tottenham Hotspur	Amsterdam, Netherlands
21:00 CEST	De Ligt 5'; Ziyech 35', (yellow card) 77'; Dolberg (yellow card) 50'; Onana (yellow card) 90+5'	Report	Sissoko (yellow card) 16'; Lucas 55', 59', 90+6'; Rose (yellow card) 76'	Stadium: Johan Cruyff Arena; Attendance: 52,641; Referee: Felix Brych (Germany)

=== Friendlies ===
23 June 2018	VVSB	0–7	Ajax	Noordwijkerhout, Netherlands
15:00 CEST		Report	Bijleveld 16', 22'; Sierhuis 24', 43'; De Wit 26'; Huntelaar 53'; Bandé 88'	Stadium: Sportpark De Boekhorst

26 June 2018	Preußen Münster (Germany)	3–1	(Netherlands) Ajax	Harsewinkel, Germany
13:00 CEST	Pires-Rodrigues 18'; Rühle 60'; Cueto 74'	Report	Kristensen 26'	Stadium: Klosterpforte Sportplatz

30 June 2018	Lippstadt 08 (Germany)	0–9	(Netherlands) Ajax	Harsewinkel, Germany
11:00 CEST		Report	Mazraoui 23', 44'; Labyad 24', 51'; Huntelaar 29', 35'; De Wit 63', 69', 73'	Stadium: Klosterpforte Sportplatz

7 July 2018	Nordsjælland (Denmark)	3–1	(Netherlands) Ajax	Putten, Netherlands
15:00 CEST	Olsen 60'; Bartolec 80'; Rasmussen 88'	Report	Solomons 90+2'	Stadium: Sportpark Putter Eng

7 July 2018	Steaua București (Romania)	1–1	(Netherlands) Ajax	Hattem, Netherlands
19:00 CEST	Tănase 6'	Report	Eiting 24'	Stadium: Sportpark 't Achterveen

13 July 2018	Ajax (Netherlands)	1–3	(Belgium) Anderlecht	Amsterdam, Netherlands
19:30 CEST	Neres 20'	Report	Santini 17', 65'; Dimata 57' (pen.)	Stadium: Olympisch Stadion

19 July 2018	Wolverhampton Wanderers (England)	1–1	(Netherlands) Ajax	Walsall, England
15:00 CEST	Neves 74' (pen.)	Report	Van de Beek 45+1'	Stadium: Bescot Stadium

19 July 2018	Walsall (England)	2–0	(Netherlands) Ajax	Walsall, England
20:45 CEST	Cook 27', 70'	Report		Stadium: Bescot Stadium

26 July 2018	Ajax (Netherlands)	0–1	(Turkey) Konyaspor	Ouder-Amstel, Netherlands
18:00 CEST			Şahiner 41'	Stadium: Sportpark De Toekomst

5 September 2018	Ajax	1–0	Utrecht	Ouder-Amstel, Netherlands
11:00 CEST	Neres 9'			Stadium: Sportpark De Toekomst

10 October 2018	Ajax	4–1	PEC Zwolle	Ouder-Amstel, Netherlands
11:00 CEST	Černý 11'; Huntelaar 18'; Thethani 88'; Bijleveld 90'		Hiwat 2'	Stadium: Sportpark De Toekomst; Referee: Christiaan Bax

14 November 2018	Ajax	3–2	Heerenveen	Ouder-Amstel, Netherlands
12:00 CET	Pasquali 20'; Danilo 55'; Brobbey 71'		Lammers 10' (pen.); Mihajlović 90' (pen.)	Stadium: Sportpark De Toekomst

11 January 2019 Florida Cup	Ajax (Netherlands)	2–2 (3–4 p)	(Brazil) Flamengo	Orlando, United States
1:00 CET	Huntelaar 16'; Labyad 34'		Uribe 19', 43'	Stadium: Orlando City Stadium; Referee: Estaban Rosano
	Penalties
	Labyad (penalty scored); Traoré (penalty scored); De Wit (penalty scored); Veltman (penalty missed); Magallán (penalty missed)		(penalty scored) Piris Da Motta; (penalty scored) Rodinei; (penalty scored) Trauco; (penalty scored) Berrío

12 January 2019 Florida Cup	Ajax (Netherlands)	4–2	(Brazil) São Paulo	Orlando, United States
19:00 CET	Van de Beek 57'; Tadić 73' (pen.); Dolberg 79'; Neres 90+1'		Hernanes 22'; Brenner 65'	Stadium: Orlando City Stadium; Referee: Elvis Osmanovic

4 February 2019	Ajax	4–1	PEC Zwolle	Ouder-Amstel, Netherlands
11:00 CEST	De Wit 8'; Labyad 30', 65', 81'		Van den Berg 76'	Stadium: Sportpark De Toekomst

19 February 2019	AZ	0–3	Ajax	Wijdewormer, Netherlands
17:00 CEST			Veltman 12'; Traoré 34', 59'	Stadium: AFAS Trainingscomplex

20 March 2019	Bayer Leverkusen (Germany)	2–1	(Netherlands) Ajax	Leverkusen, Germany
14:00 CEST	Bellarabi 40'; Paulinho 50'	Report	Danilo 15'	Stadium: BayArena

== Transfers for 2018–19 ==
For a list of all Dutch football transfers in the summer window (1 July 2018 to 31 August 2018) please see List of Dutch football transfers summer 2018. For a list of all Dutch football transfers in the winter window (1 January 2019 to 1 February 2019) please see List of Dutch football transfers winter 2018–19.

=== Arrivals ===
- The following players moved to AFC Ajax.

	Name	Position	Period	Previous club	Fee
Transfer
Substituted on	(Burkina Faso) Hassane Bandé	Forward	Summer	(Belgium) Mechelen	€8,250,000
Substituted on	(Morocco) Zakaria Labyad	Midfielder	Summer	(Netherlands) Utrecht	€7,000,000
Substituted on	(Serbia) Dušan Tadić	Midfielder	Summer	(England) Southampton	€11,400,000
Substituted on	(Netherlands) Daley Blind	Defender	Summer	(England) Manchester United	€16,000,000
Substituted on	(Argentina) Lisandro Magallán	Defender	Winter	(Argentina) Boca Juniors	€9,000,000
Free Transfer
Substituted on	(Burkina Faso) Lassina Traoré	Forward	Winter	(South Africa) Ajax Cape Town	-
Loan
Substituted on	(Portugal) Bruno Varela	Goalkeeper	Winter	(Portugal) Benfica	-
Return from loan spell
Substituted on	(Netherlands) Leeroy Owusu	Defender	Summer	(Netherlands) Almere City	-
Substituted on	(Netherlands) Perr Schuurs	Defender	Summer	(Netherlands) Fortuna Sittard	-
Substituted on	(Morocco) Zakaria El Azzouzi	Forward	Summer	(Netherlands) Excelsior	-
Substituted on	(Colombia) Mateo Cassierra	Forward	Winter	(Netherlands) Groningen	-

=== Departures ===
- The following players moved from AFC Ajax.

	Name	Position	Period	New club	Fee
Transfer
Substituted off	(Netherlands) Leeroy Owusu	Defender	Summer	(Netherlands) De Graafschap	?
Substituted off	(Netherlands) Darren Sidoel	Defender	Summer	(England) Reading	?
Substituted off	(Netherlands) Danilho Doekhi	Defender	Summer	(Netherlands) Vitesse	?
Substituted off	(Netherlands) Zian Flemming	Midfielder	Summer	(Netherlands) PEC Zwolle	?
Substituted off	(Netherlands) Justin Kluivert	Forward	Summer	(Italy) Roma	€22,750,000
Substituted off	(Austria) Maximilian Wöber	Defender	Winter	(Spain) Sevilla	€11,000,000
Substituted off	(Finland) Saku Ylätupa	Forward	Winter	(Sweden) AIK Fotboll	?
Free Transfer
Substituted off	(Netherlands) Norbert Alblas	Goalkeeper	Summer	(Netherlands) N.E.C.	-
Substituted off	(Netherlands) Peter Leeuwenburgh	Goalkeeper	Summer	(South Africa) Cape Town City	-
Substituted off	(Netherlands) Léon Bergsma	Defender	Summer	(Netherlands) AZ	-
Substituted off	(Netherlands) Mitchell Dijks	Defender	Summer	(Italy) Bologna	-
Substituted off	(Netherlands) Danilho Doekhi	Defender	Summer	(Netherlands) Vitesse	-
Substituted off	(Netherlands) Ki-Jana Hoever	Defender	Summer	(England) Liverpool	-
Substituted off	(Netherlands) Terry Lartey Sanniez	Defender	Summer	(Netherlands) N.E.C.	-
Substituted off	(Netherlands) Mauro Savastano	Defender	Summer	(Netherlands) AZ	-
Substituted off	(Netherlands) Nick Viergever	Defender	Summer	(Netherlands) PSV	-
Substituted off	(Netherlands) Deyovaisio Zeefuik	Defender	Summer	(Netherlands) Groningen	-
Substituted off	(Morocco) Reda Boultam	Midfielder	Summer	(Italy) Cremonese	-
Substituted off	(Netherlands) Denilho Cleonise	Midfielder	Summer	(Italy) Genoa	-
Substituted off	(Romania) Ricardo Farcaş	Midfielder	Summer	(Italy) SPAL	-
Substituted off	(Netherlands) Vince Gino Dekker	Forward	Summer	(Netherlands) AZ	-
Substituted off	(Netherlands) Mees de Wit	Forward	Summer	(Portugal) Sporting CP	-
Substituted off	(Germany) Amin Younes	Forward	Summer	(Italy) Napoli	-
Substituted off	(Morocco) Zakaria El Azzouzi	Forward	Winter	(Netherlands) Emmen	-
Substituted off	(Hungary) Szabolcs Schön	Forward	Winter	(Hungary) MTK Budapest	-
Out on loan
Substituted off	(Netherlands) Benjamin van Leer	Goalkeeper	Summer	(Netherlands) NAC Breda	-
Substituted off	(Netherlands) Robin Schouten	Defender	Summer	(Netherlands) Volendam	-
Substituted off	(Netherlands) Siem de Jong	Midfielder	Summer	(Australia) Sydney FC	-
Substituted off	(Colombia) Mateo Cassierra	Forward	Summer	(Netherlands) Groningen	-
Substituted off	(Colombia) Luis Manuel Orejuela	Defender	Winter	(Brazil) Cruzeiro	-
Substituted off	(Netherlands) Azor Matusiwa	Midfielder	Winter	(Netherlands) De Graafschap	-
Substituted off	(Netherlands) Kaj Sierhuis	Forward	Winter	(Netherlands) Groningen	-
Substituted off	(Norway) Dennis Johnsen	Forward	Winter	(Netherlands) Heerenveen	-
Substituted off	(Colombia) Mateo Cassierra	Forward	Winter	(Argentina) Racing Club	-
