= Frenkie de Jong =

Dutch footballer (born 1997)

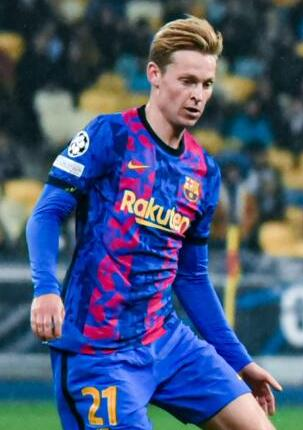
- De Jong playing for Barcelona in 2021

Personal information
- Full name: Frenkie de Jong
- Date of birth: 12 May 1997 (age 29)
- Place of birth: Gorinchem, Netherlands
- Height: 1.81 m (5 ft 11 in)
- Position: Midfielder

Team information
- Current team: Barcelona
- Number: 21

Youth career
- ASV Arkel
- RKC Waalwijk
- 2013–2015: Willem II

Senior career*
Years	Team	Apps	(Gls)
2015	Willem II	1	(0)
2015–2017	Jong Ajax	46	(8)
2015	→ Willem II (loan)	1	(0)
2016–2019	Ajax	57	(4)
2019–	Barcelona	206	(15)

International career^{‡}
2012	Netherlands U15	1	(0)
2014–2015	Netherlands U18	5	(1)
2015–2016	Netherlands U19	8	(0)
2016	Netherlands U20	2	(0)
2017	Netherlands U21	6	(1)
2018–	Netherlands	71	(2)
Medal record
Men's football
Representing Netherlands
UEFA Nations League
Runner-up	2019 Portugal
- * Club domestic league appearances and goals as of 18:37, 22 November 2026 (UTC) ‡ National team caps and goals as of 22:22, 13 November 2026 (UTC)

Frenkie de Jong (Dutch pronunciation: [ˈfrɛŋki də ˈjɔŋ]; born 12 May 1997) is a Dutch professional footballer who plays as a midfielder for La Liga club Barcelona and the Netherlands national team.

De Jong began his professional career at Willem II in 2015. He transferred to Ajax for a symbolic fee of €1 a year later, offset by a sell-on clause. At Ajax, he established himself as one of the best young midfielders in Europe, after winning a domestic double and reaching the Champions League semi-finals. De Jong won the Eredivisie and KNVB Cup, was Eredivisie player of the season, and was an instrumental part of Ajax's first UEFA Champions League semi-final appearance in 22 years, in a breakthrough 2018–19 season.

During his breakthrough season, De Jong agreed to sign for Barcelona in January 2019, leading him to be signed for the club in July, for a fee worth €75 million. De Jong was selected to the 2019 FIFA FIFPRO World 11 and was one of three Dutch players to feature in it for the first time in five years.

De Jong made his senior international debut for the Netherlands in September 2018. He became a starter in the inaugural UEFA Nations League, in which Netherlands finished runners-up. He also represented the side at UEFA Euro 2020, the 2022 FIFA World Cup and the 2026 World Cup.

== Early life and career ==
Frenkie de Jong was born in Gorinchem and grew up in Arkel, a town in the province of South Holland. His parents, Marjon Schuchhard-de Bruijn, who works in home care, and John de Jong, a parking enforcement officer, named him after the British pop band Frankie Goes to Hollywood. He has a younger brother, Youri de Jong. Frenkie de Jong started playing football at six years old when his father enrolled him at the local amateur club ASV Arkel. At eight, De Jong was scouted by the professional club Willem II, where he progressed through the shared youth academy of Willem II and RKC Waalwijk.

== Club career ==
=== Willem II ===
De Jong signed his first professional contract with Willem II on 1 August 2013, aged sixteen. On 10 May 2015, De Jong made his Eredivisie debut against ADO Den Haag, two days before his eighteenth birthday. He was substituted in the 68th minute for Terell Ondaan in a 1–0 home win over ADO Den Haag.

=== Ajax ===
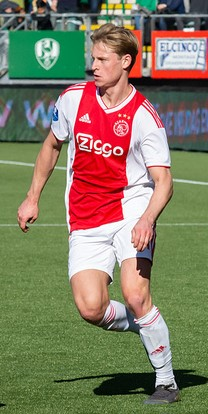
De Jong playing for Ajax in 2019

At the beginning of the season, on 22 August 2015, Ajax purchased De Jong. He signed a four-year contract, for a symbolic €1 fee which included a 10% sell-on bonus. On 23 August 2015, he was loaned back to Willem II until 31 December 2015. During this time, he made one substitute appearance in an Eredivisie match against PEC Zwolle.

==== 2016–2019: Development and first-team regular ====
For the first two years at Ajax, De Jong was in and out of the first team squad. After returning to the club in January 2016, de Jong made 15 appearances in the 2015—16 Eerste Divisie for Ajax II. He primarily played in the centre of a three-man midfield and scored two goals. The following year, he was awarded the 2016–17 Eerste Divisie's Talent of the season award for his performances with Ajax II for whom, he made 31 first team appearances and played as a central, and defensive, midfielder.

He made his senior debut against Sparta Rotterdam coming on, in the 88th minute, for Lasse Schöne. In total, he made four senior appearances for Ajax, and scored one goal against Go Ahead Eagles, in the 2016—17 season. He started one game, came off the bench thrice, and was an unused substitute in 13 games. He also made his European debut and made four substitute, and three bench, appearances, in the 2016–17 Europa League. He came off the bench in the 82nd minute against Manchester United in the final. It was Ajax's first European final in 21 years.

Aged 20, he made 26 appearances for the first team. Primarily he featured as a center-back, in a back four, alongside national teammate Matthijs de Ligt due to the departure of Davinson Sanchez. He also played in a three-man center-midfield. He recorded eight assists in 22 league appearances and received two yellow cards. Towards the end of the season, he was injured—tendonitis, syndesmotic ligament tear, hairline crack in calf bone—and missed three months. De Jong made two substitute appearances in the 2017–18 Champions League qualification, as Ajax lost on away goals against Nice (3–3) in the third qualifying round.

In the 2018–19 season, he primarily played in the middle of a three-man midfield. De Jong was the Eredivisie player of the month in December (2018) and February (2019)—in which he completed 354 of 390 passes and made 53 ball recoveries. Later that month, he received praise from Rafael Van Der Vaart, who said De Jong was among the best players in Europe with the ball at his feet. It is unclear whether during or prior to the beginning of the campaign he rejected an offer from Tottenham Hotspur, saying the "moment wasn't right", and wanted to play a full season in his preferred position at Ajax.

De Jong achieved success, and widespread recognition, during the 2018–19 season and led Ajax to their first domestic double (league and cup) since the 2001–02 season. Ajax wrestled with PSV Eindhoven all season for the league, and finished the last five weeks at the top of the table. He made 51 total appearances and starred in Ajax's first leg (0–1) win over Tottenham Hotspur in the 2018–19 UEFA Champions League semi-final at the Tottenham Hotspur Stadium—in which De Jong had the most touches by any player on the pitch (87) and an 86.2 percent pass completion rate. It was the first time Ajax had reached the tournament semi-final since 1997. The team eliminated Juventus (3–2 on agg.) in the quarter-finals and Real Madrid (5–3 on agg.) In the second leg of the semi-final, Ajax lost 2–3 at home and were knocked out on away goals to English club Tottenham Hotspur. De Jong was selected to the 2018–19 UEFA Champions League squad of the season and voted the tournament's midfielder of the season.

=== Barcelona ===
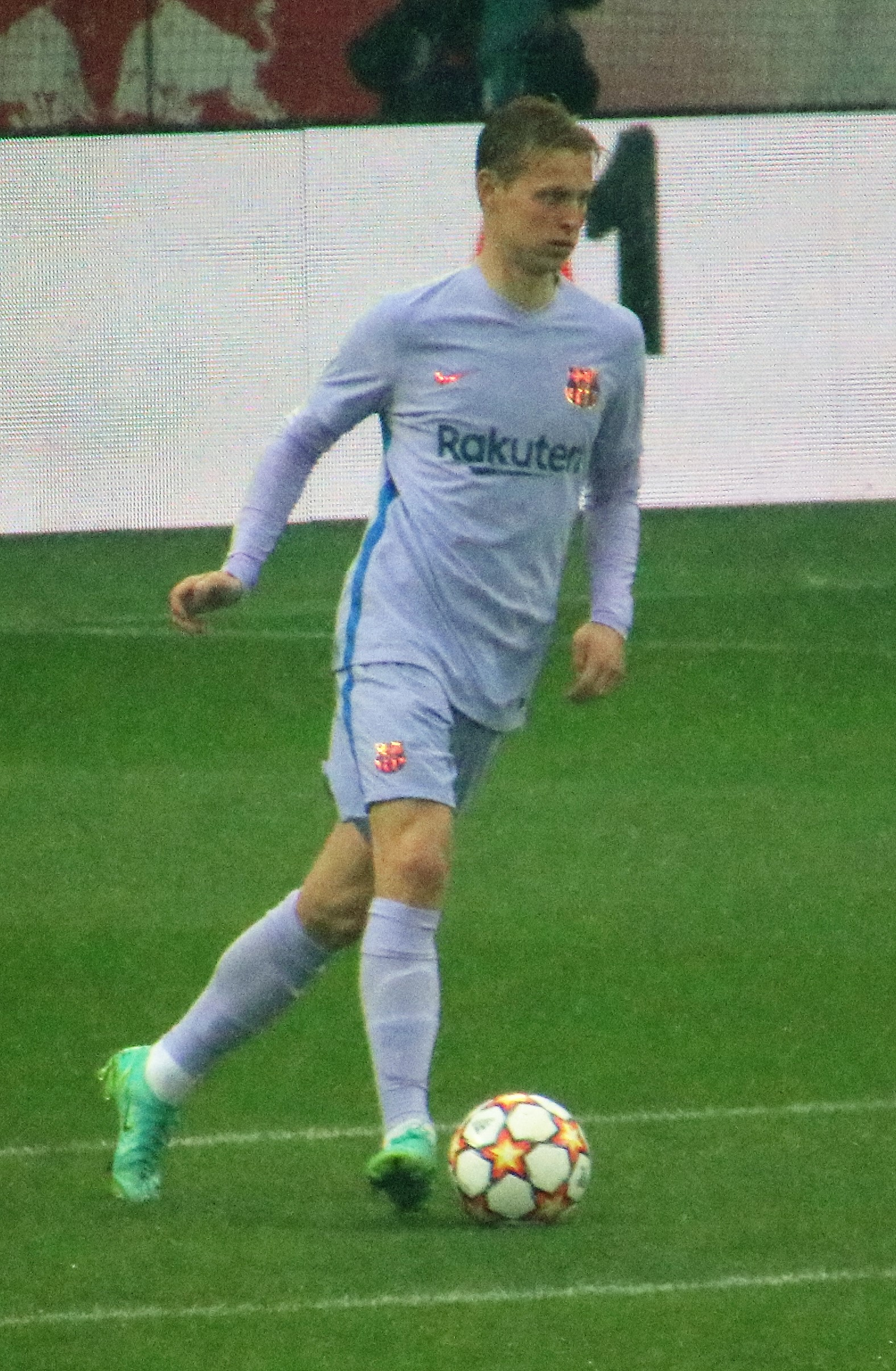
De Jong with Barcelona in 2021

On 23 January 2019, La Liga club Barcelona announced the signing of de Jong on a five-year contract, effective from 1 July 2019, for an initial fee worth €75 million. De Jong had transfer discussions with Paris Saint-Germain, Manchester City and Manchester United, before ultimately opting for Barcelona. He made his competitive debut on 16 August 2019, in a 0–1 opening day defeat to Athletic Bilbao. He scored his first goal for the club in a La Liga fixture on 14 September 2019, the team's second goal in a 5-2 win against Valencia.

He played a crucial role in the 2021 Copa del Rey final, a 4–0 win over Athletic Bilbao, scoring in the 63rd minute and assisting two further goals.

Following the departure of club captain Sergio Busquets, de Jong became the fourth captain of Barcelona on 21 July 2023. On 25 November 2023, in a match against Rayo Vallecano, he debuted as captain for Barcelona due to absences of Sergi Roberto, Marc-André ter Stegen and Ronald Araujo. In January 2024, de Jong played his 200th game for Barcelona in a 3–1 victory against Unionistas in the Copa del Rey round of 16. On 24 February 2024, he scored the 11,000th goal in Barcelona's history in a 3–0 win against Getafe.

In the 2024–25 season, de Jong was named the club's third captain after the departure of Sergi Roberto. The ankle injury he sustained in the previous season kept him sidelined until the second Champions League fixture against Young Boys in October 2024. In the 75th minute, he made his first minutes under Hansi Flick and for the season. He found his form in the latter half of the season. He made 44 appearances across all competitions, and his performances were marked by a high passing accuracy and tactical intelligence, solidifying his position as a key player in the squad. His resurgence in form led to discussions about contract renewal, with club officials expressing a desire to extend his stay at Barcelona.

On 15 October 2025, he extended his contract with the club until 2029. On 22 April 2026, he featured in his 293rd match for Barcelona in a 1–0 victory over Celta Vigo, becoming the Dutch player with the most appearances for the club, breaking the previous record held by Phillip Cocu.

== International career ==
=== Youth ===
De Jong made eight appearances for the Netherlands under-19 team, with his debut coming against Russia on 7 July 2015. He made six appearances and scored one goal for the Netherlands at under-21 level.

=== Senior career ===
==== 2018–2019: Early senior career ====
In August 2018, De Jong received his first call-up to the Dutch senior squad for a friendly match against Peru, eventually debuting in said match as a half-time substitute to Giorginio Wijnaldum on 22 September of the same year. Three days later, he started for the first time in a 2–1 loss to France in the league phase of the 2018–19 UEFA Nations League.

In June 2019, De Jong was included in the Netherlands' squad for 2019 UEFA Nations League Finals, where he was named as Young Player of the Tournament as the Oranje finished as runner-up to hosts Portugal. The same year in September, De Jong scored his first senior international goal in the Netherlands' 4–2 victory against Germany in UEFA Euro 2020 qualifying.

=== 2020s ===
In June 2021, De Jong was included in coach Frank de Boer's squad for UEFA Euro 2020. He played in all three group matches, as well as the Netherlands' 2–0 loss to Czechia in the round of 16.

In November 2022, De Jong was included in the Dutch squad for the 2022 FIFA World Cup. On 29 November, he scored his first World Cup goal in a 2–0 win over tournament host Qatar in the team's final group match. On 9 December, he played the full 120 minutes as the Netherlands lost in a penalty shootout to eventual winners Argentina at the quarter-final stage.

In June 2023, De Jong was part of the Netherlands' squad for the 2023 UEFA Nations League Finals, where he played the full match against both Croatia in the semi-final and Italy in the third place play-off. De Jong was named in the Netherlands' squad for UEFA Euro 2024, but had to withdraw due to an ankle injury.

On 27 May 2026, De Jong was named in the Netherlands' squad for the 2026 FIFA World Cup.

== Style of play ==
"With his talent, at his age, he could become a Xavi or an Iniesta."

— Former Netherlands international and Ajax sporting director Marc Overmars on De Jong

Frenkie has described himself as a player "who likes to have the ball a lot, and play possession". A versatile player, De Jong can function as a regista, defensive-midfielder, central-midfielder, holding midfielder, box-to-box midfielder and centre-back. He has been lauded for his combination of defensive stability and playmaking ability. He often partnered Matthijs de Ligt at centre-back, at Ajax. As a centre-back, he abstained from committing fouls, showed great positional sense, and won possession frequently. In this more defensive role, his performances led to comparison with former German sweeper Franz Beckenbauer and likened his tendency to progress forward in possession, and ability to play-make, from defense to the German legend.

"We saw the other day De Jong is a footballer who can mark an era in Barcelona. He is able to dominate the game, he sees it easily and doesn't lose the ball. He also makes sacrifices to work defensively. I think they are top-level players, very good for Barca."

— Former Barcelona midfielder Xavi on De Jong

De Jong's vision has been praised alongside his ability to dribble in narrow spaces, control over possession, and decisive passing. A natural dribbler, De Jong has the highest dribbling success of all players to participate in all competitions, during his last season with Ajax.

His other attributes include a penchant for long cross-field passes, creating space, and absorbing attacking pressure. His close control, accuracy, work rate, and movement has drawn comparisons with Andrés Iniesta and Johan Cruyff. At Barcelona, he has primarily played on either side of a three-man central midfield. This has led experts and former players to regard him as a player with "Barca DNA" who was "born to play for Barcelona".

== Personal life ==
Since he started playing professionally, De Jong has chosen 21 on his shirt as a tribute to his grandfather who was born on 21 April.

De Jong met his wife Mikky Kiemeney in high school and they have been together since 2014. The couple became engaged in July 2022, and married in May 2024. The couple have two sons.

== Career statistics ==
=== Club ===
As of match played 22 November 2026

Appearances and goals by club, season and competition
Club	Season	League			National cup (Note: Includes KNVB Cup, Copa del Rey)		Europe		Other		Total	
Club	Season	Division	Apps	Goals	Apps	Goals	Apps	Goals	Apps	Goals	Apps	Goals
Willem II	2014–15	Eredivisie	1	0	0	0	—		—		1	0
Willem II	2015–16	Eredivisie	1	0	1	0	—		—		2	0
Willem II	Total		2	0	1	0	—		—		3	0
Jong Ajax	2015–16	Eerste Divisie	15	2	—		—		—		15	2
Jong Ajax	2016–17	Eerste Divisie	31	6	—		—		—		31	6
Jong Ajax	Total		46	8	—		—		—		46	8
Ajax	2016–17	Eredivisie	4	1	3	0	4 (Note: Appearances in UEFA Europa League)	0	—		11	1
Ajax	2017–18	Eredivisie	22	0	2	1	2 (Note: Appearances in UEFA Champions League)	0	—		26	1
Ajax	2018–19	Eredivisie	31	3	4	0	17	0	—		52	3
Ajax	Total		57	4	9	1	23	0	—		89	5
Barcelona	2019–20	La Liga	29	2	3	0	9	0	1 (Note: Appearance(s) in Supercopa de España)	0	42	2
Barcelona	2020–21	La Liga	37	3	5	3	7	0	2	1	51	7
Barcelona	2021–22	La Liga	32	3	2	0	12 (Note: Six appearances in UEFA Champions League, six appearances and one goal in UEFA Europa League)	1	1	0	47	4
Barcelona	2022–23	La Liga	33	2	2	0	6 (Note: Four appearances in UEFA Champions League, two appearances in UEFA Europa League)	0	2	0	43	2
Barcelona	2023–24	La Liga	20	2	3	0	5	0	2	0	30	2
Barcelona	2024–25	La Liga	26	2	6	0	13	0	1	0	46	2
Barcelona	2025–26	La Liga	25	1	3	0	8	0	2	0	38	1
Barcelona	2026–27	La Liga	4	0	0	0	1	0	0	0	5	0
Barcelona	Total		206	15	24	3	61	1	11	1	302	20
Career total			311	27	34	4	84	1	11	1	440	33

=== International ===
As of match played 13 November 2026

Appearances and goals by national team and year
National team	Year	Apps	Goals
Netherlands	2018	5	0
Netherlands	2019	10	1
Netherlands	2020	7	0
Netherlands	2021	16	0
Netherlands	2022	12	1
Netherlands	2023	4	0
Netherlands	2024	1	0
Netherlands	2025	9	0
Netherlands	2026	7	0
Total		71	2

As of match played 14 June 2026
Scores and results list the Netherlands' goal tally first; score column indicates score after each De Jong goal.

List of international goals scored by Frenkie de Jong
No.	Date	Venue	Cap	Opponent	Score	Result	Competition	Ref.
1	6 September 2019	Volksparkstadion, Hamburg, Germany	10	Germany	1–1	4–2	UEFA Euro 2020 qualifying	
2	29 November 2022	Al Bayt Stadium, Al Khor, Qatar	48	Qatar	2–0	2–0	2022 FIFA World Cup	

== Honours ==
Ajax

- Eredivisie: 2018–19
- KNVB Cup: 2018–19
- UEFA Europa League runner-up: 2016–17

Barcelona

- La Liga: 2022–23, 2024–25, 2025–26
- Copa del Rey: 2020–21, 2024–25
- Supercopa de España: 2023, 2025, 2026

Netherlands

- UEFA Nations League runner-up: 2018–19

Individual

- Eerste Divisie Talent of the Season: 2016–17
- Eredivisie Player of the Month: December 2018, February 2019
- Eredivisie Player of the Season: 2018–19
- Eredivisie Team of the Season: 2018–19
- UEFA Champions League Squad of the Season: 2018–19
- UEFA Champions League Midfielder of the Season: 2018–19
- Johan Cruyff Trophy: 2018–19
- UEFA Nations League Finals Young Player of the Tournament: 2019
- UEFA Nations League Finals Team of the Tournament: 2019
- FIFA FIFPro World11: 2019
- IFFHS Men's World Team: 2019
- UEFA Team of the Year: 2019
- Premi Barça Jugadors (Barça Players Award): 2020–21
