= Keje Molenaar =

Dutch footballer (born 1958)

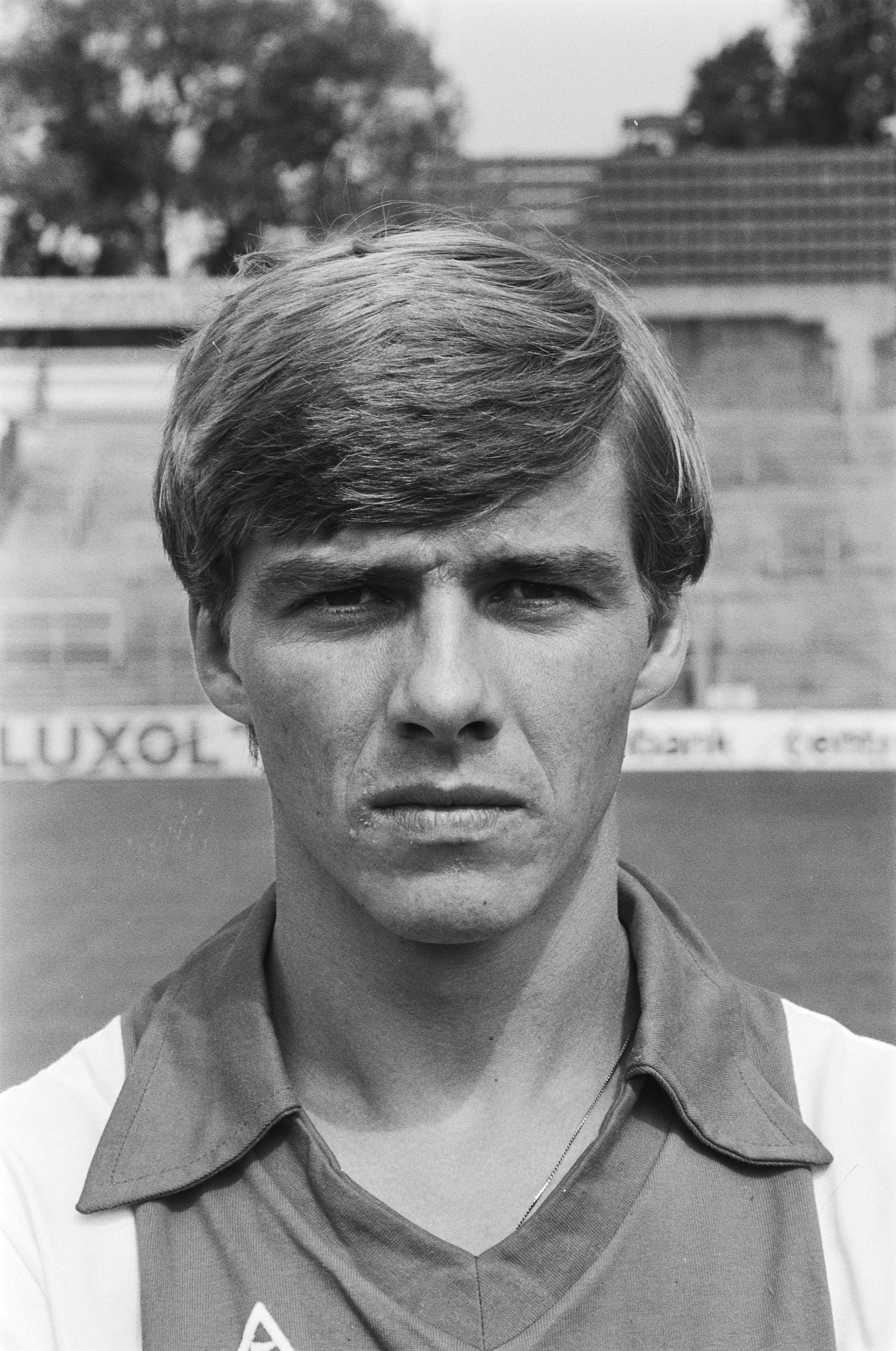

Personal information
- Date of birth: 29 September 1958 (age 68)
- Place of birth: Volendam, Netherlands
- Position: Defender

Youth career
- Volendam

Senior career*
Years	Team	Apps	(Gls)
1977–1980	Volendam	89	(22)
1980–1984	Ajax	81	(16)
1984–1985	Volendam	32	(2)
1985–1988	Feyenoord	100	(11)
1988–1990	SVV	23	(1)

International career
1980–1981	Netherlands	2	(0)
- * Club domestic league appearances and goals

Cornelis Ignatius Maria "Keje" Molenaar (born 29 September 1958) is a Dutch former professional footballer who played as a defender. Molenaar made his professional debut at Volendam and also played for Ajax, Feyenoord and SVV.

His ex son-in-law is Matthijs de Ligt.
