= Nicolás Tagliafico =

Argentine footballer (born 1992)

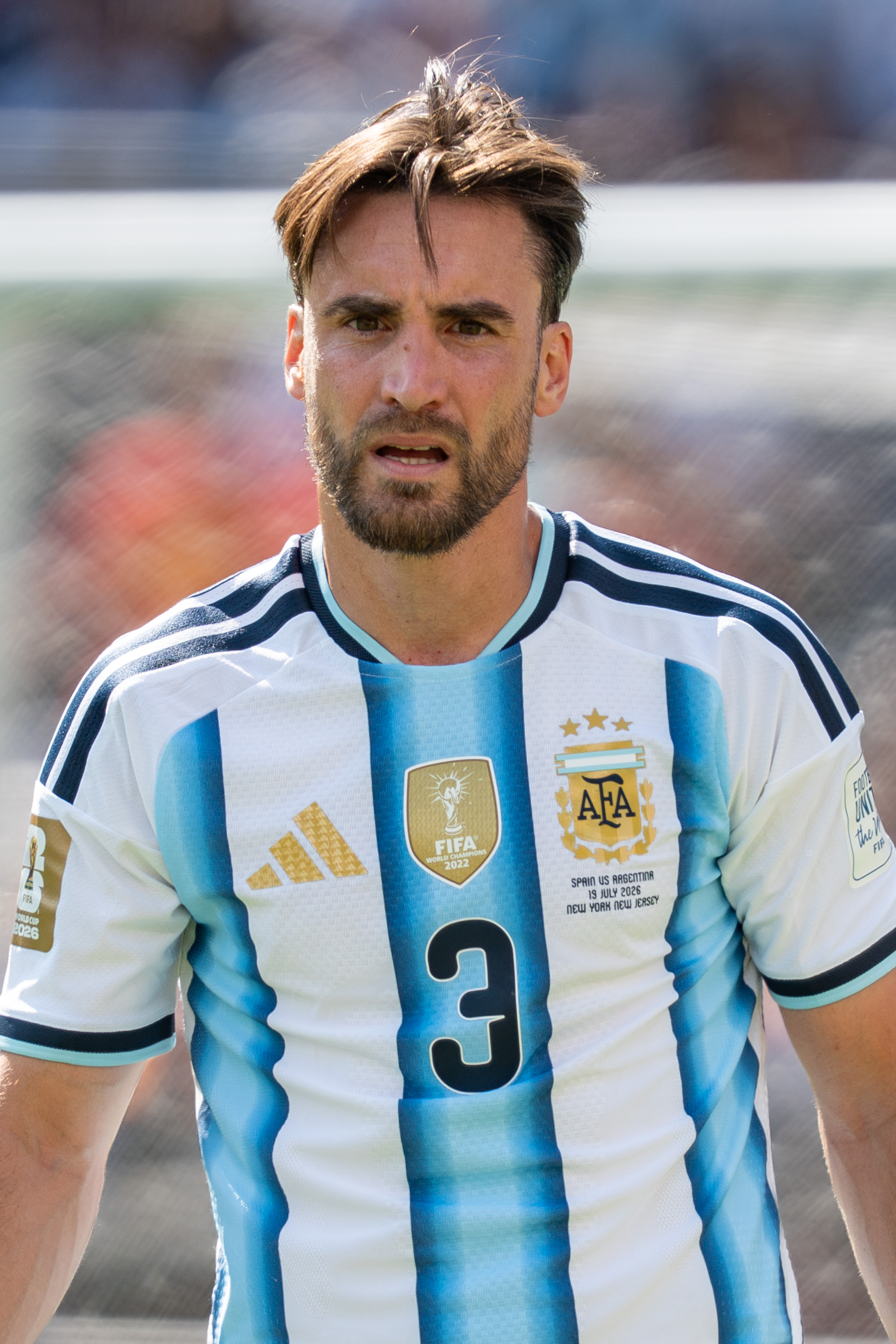
- Tagliafico with Argentina in 2026

Personal information
- Full name: Nicolás Alejandro Tagliafico
- Date of birth: 31 August 1992 (age 34)
- Place of birth: Rafael Calzada, Buenos Aires, Argentina
- Height: 1.70 m (5 ft 7 in)
- Position: Left-back

Team information
- Current team: Lyon
- Number: 3

Youth career
- 2007–2010: Banfield

Senior career*
Years	Team	Apps	(Gls)
2010–2015	Banfield	90	(2)
2012–2013	→ Real Murcia (loan)	27	(0)
2015–2018	Independiente	85	(2)
2018–2022	Ajax	115	(9)
2022–	Lyon	107	(7)

International career^{‡}
2007	Argentina U15	2	(0)
2009	Argentina U17	5	(0)
2011	Argentina U20	12	(1)
2017–	Argentina	83	(1)
Medal record
Men's football
Representing Argentina
FIFA World Cup
Winner	2022 Qatar
Runner-up	2026 Canada–Mexico–US
Copa América
Winner	2021 Brazil
Winner	2024 United States
Third place	2019 Brazil
CONMEBOL–UEFA Cup of Champions
Winner	2022 England
- * Club domestic league appearances and goals as of 21 November 2026 ‡ National team caps and goals as of 19 July 2026

Nicolás Alejandro Tagliafico (Italian: [taʎʎaˈfiːko]; born 31 August 1992) is an Argentine professional footballer who plays as a left-back for Ligue 1 club Lyon and the Argentina national team.

He started his career at Banfield in Argentina before moving to Independiente where he won the 2017 Copa Sudamericana. He moved to Europe in 2018 to play with Dutch team Ajax, winning the Eredivisie three times before joining French team Lyon in 2022.

He was part of the Argentina squads for the 2018, 2022, and 2026 World Cups, winning the 2022 edition where he started the final. He was also part of the squads at the 2019, 2021, and 2024 Copa Américas, winning the latter two.

== Club career ==
=== Banfield ===
Tagliafico made his professional debut for Banfield on a 2−1 away victory against Tigre for the fifth fixture of the 2011 Clausura, coming on as a substitute on the 72nd minute. Due to Marcelo Bustamante's ban, he was a starter the following game, a 2−2 draw with Huracán. In 2012, Tagliafico signed a one-year loan deal with Spanish club Real Murcia.

=== Independiente ===
In 2015, he made the move to Independiente for an undisclosed transfer fee and made his professional debut for the club during a 3−2 away win at Newell's Old Boys. Tagliafico would end up captaining the team that won the 2017 Copa Sudamericana.

=== Ajax ===
On 5 January 2018, Tagliafico moved to Eredivisie club Ajax for an estimated transfer fee of £4 million. He made his professional debut for the club on 21 January 2018 in a 2−0 home victory against rivals Feyenoord in the Klassieker. Under manager Erik ten Hag, he established himself as the team's primary left-back due to his defensive tenacity and tactical discipline. He scored his first goal for the club on 11 March 2018 in a 4–1 league victory over SC Heerenveen.

During the 2018–19 season, Tagliafico was an integral component of the Ajax squad that achieved a domestic double and reached the semi-finals of the UEFA Champions League. He made his debut in the UEFA Champions League group stage on 19 September 2018, scoring a brace in a 3–0 home victory over AEK Athens. He also scored a late equalising goal in a 3–3 draw against Bayern Munich on 12 December 2018 to ensure Ajax finished the group stage undefeated. Tagliafico featured prominently in the knockout phase, where Ajax eliminated Real Madrid and Juventus before exiting to Tottenham Hotspur on away goals. At the conclusion of the season, he won his first Eredivisie title and the KNVB Cup, alongside being named the Eredivisie Player of the Month for November 2018.

In the 2019–20 season, Tagliafico maintained his regular starting role, contributing three goals in 24 league matches and scoring in continental fixtures against Lille and Valencia. Although the Eredivisie campaign was voided without a champion due to the COVID-19 pandemic, he signed a contract extension in late 2020 to remain in Amsterdam despite interest from alternative European top-flight clubs.

On 21 October 2020, Tagliafico scored an own goal in a 1–0 home defeat against Liverpool in the 2020–21 UEFA Champions League group stage. Despite this, he helped Ajax secure another domestic double during the 2020–21 season, featuring in 25 league matches and starting the 2021 KNVB Cup Final, which ended in a 2–1 win over Vitesse.

During his final year at the club, the 2021–22 season, Tagliafico faced rotation for the starting left-back position with teammate Daley Blind. He adapted to a fluctuating role across the defense, making 22 Eredivisie appearances and scoring two goals. He concluded his tenure at Ajax with a third consecutive Eredivisie title before transferring to Olympique Lyonnais in July 2022. In total, Tagliafico made 169 official appearances for Ajax, scoring 16 goals across all competitions.

=== Lyon ===
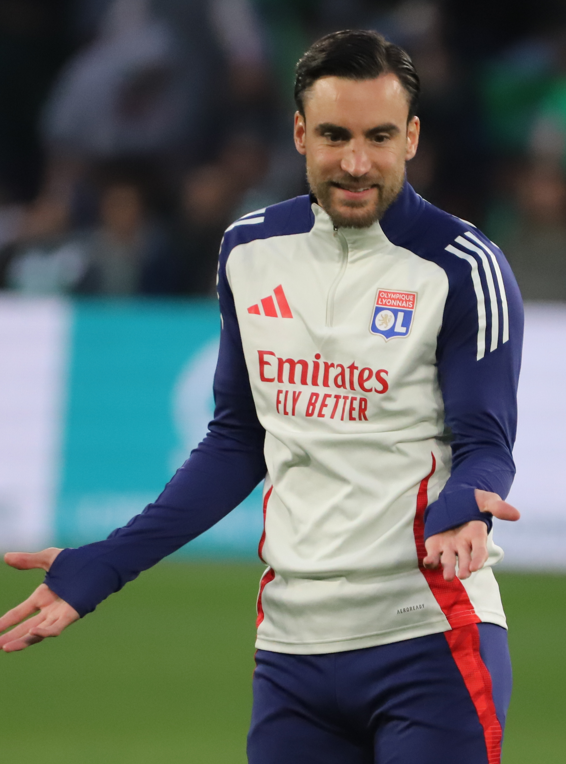
Tagliafico with Lyon in 2025

On 23 July 2022, he joined Ligue 1 club Lyon on a three-year deal until June 2025, for €4.2 million. Nearing a departure from Lyon, he renewed his contract with the club on 1 August 2025, signing a two-year contract extension until 30 June 2027.

== International career ==
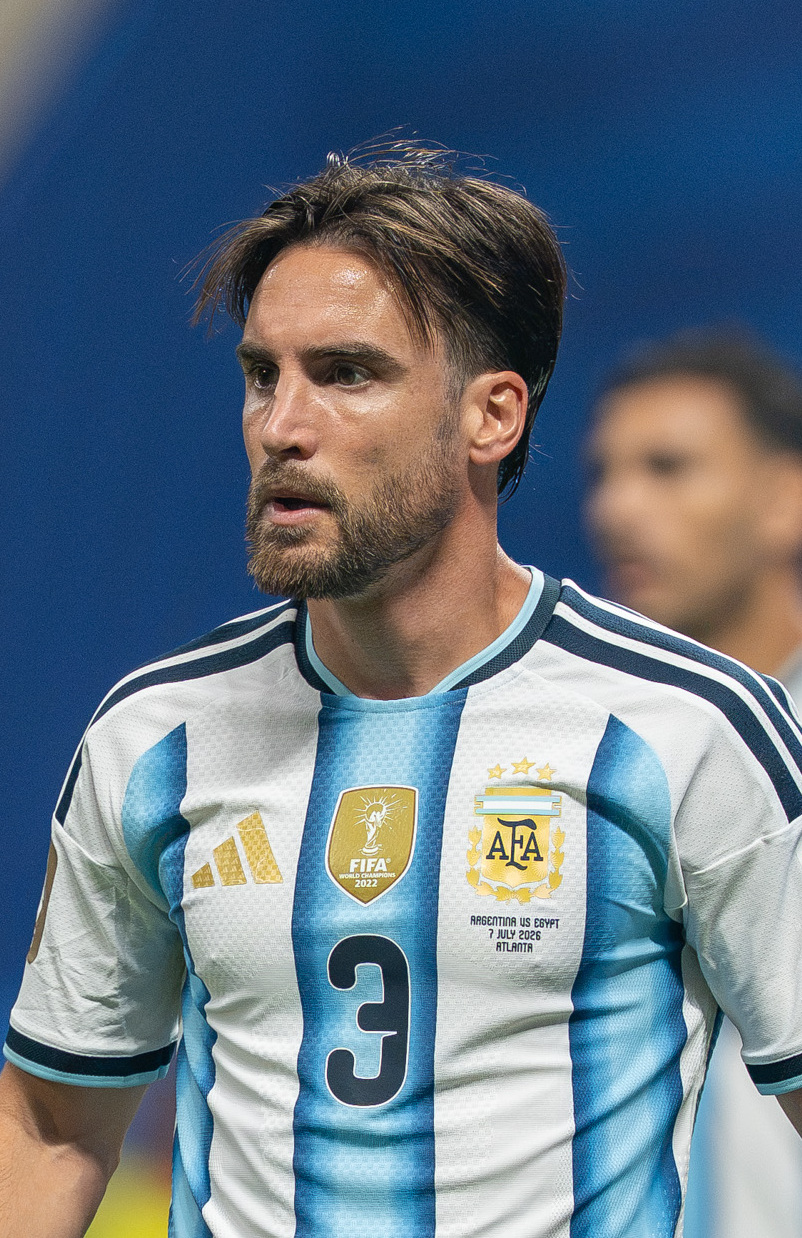
Tagliafico with Argentina in 2026

Tagliafico has played in all the youth categories of the Argentina national team: under-15, under-17 and under-20. Tagliafico impressed for the Argentina national under-20 football team at the 2011 FIFA U-20 World Cup in Colombia; however, he missed Argentina's final kick in the quarter-final penalty shoot-out against Portugal, meaning Argentina exited that competition 5–4 on penalties (Cartagena, 13 August 2011).

In May 2018, he was named in Argentina's final 23 man squad for the 2018 World Cup in Russia. He also played the 2019 Copa América, and took with Argentina the third place, through a 2–1 victory over Chile in the third-place match.

In June 2021, he was included in Lionel Scaloni's final Argentina 28-man squad for the 2021 Copa América.

In November 2022, he was named in Argentina's final 26-man squad for the 2022 FIFA World Cup in Qatar by Scaloni. Tagliafico was part of the starting line-up in the final against France, where Argentina won the World Cup by a score of 4–2 on penalties.

In June 2024, Tagliafico was included in Lionel Scaloni's final 26-man Argentina squad for the 2024 Copa América.

On 27 May 2026, Tagliafico was selected in the 26-man squad for the 2026 FIFA World Cup.

== Style of play ==
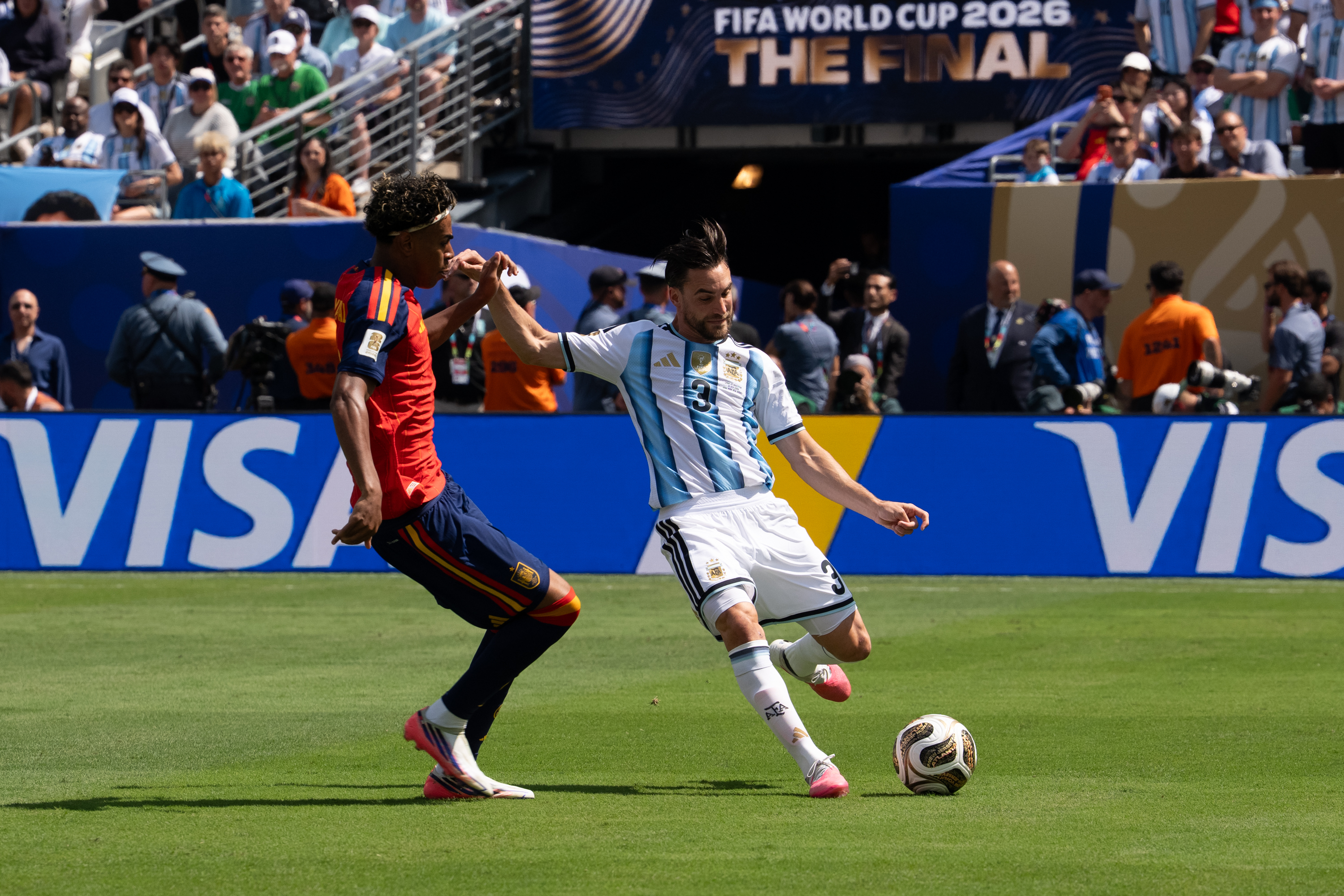
Tagliafico clearing the ball in the 2026 FIFA World Cup final.

Tagliafico is noted for his "lung-busting stamina, excellent technique, and continuous enterprise". As a result of his skills, as well as his playing position and nationality, and striking visual resemblance, he has been compared to the Inter Milan and Argentina full-back Javier Zanetti, formerly also of Banfield.

== Personal life ==
Tagliafico was born in on 31 August 1992 in Rafael Calzada, a local city in Buenos Aires Province,. Tagliafico is of Italian descent. His paternal grandparents are from the city of Genoa, whereas his maternal family are of Calabrian origin; he also has Italian citizenship. Several ancestors of Tagliafico immigrated and settled across Argentina, primarily in Buenos Aires and Córdoba, and Uruguay.

== Career statistics ==
=== Club ===
As of match played 21 November 2026

Appearances and goals by club, season and competition
Club	Season	League			National cup (Note: Includes Copa Argentina, Copa del Rey, KNVB Cup, Coupe de France)		Continental		Other		Total	
Club	Season	Division	Apps	Goals	Apps	Goals	Apps	Goals	Apps	Goals	Apps	Goals
Banfield	2010–11	Argentine Primera División	9	0	–		–		–		9	0
Banfield	2011–12	Argentine Primera División	33	1	0	0	–		–		33	1
Banfield	2013–14	Primera B Nacional	34	0	2	1	–		–		36	1
Banfield	2014	Argentine Primera División	14	1	0	0	–		–		14	1
Banfield	Total		90	2	2	1	–		–		92	3
Real Murcia (loan)	2012–13	Segunda División	27	0	1	0	–		–		28	0
Independiente	2015	Argentine Primera División	31	1	2	0	6 (Note: Appearances in Copa Sudamericana)	0	–		39	1
Independiente	2016	Argentine Primera División	16	1	2	0	4	0	3 (Note: Appearances in Torneos de Verano)	0	25	1
Independiente	2016–17	Argentine Primera División	29	0	1	0	11	0	2	0	43	0
Independiente	2017–18	Argentine Primera División	9	0	–		–		–		9	0
Independiente	Total		85	2	5	0	21	0	5	0	116	2
Ajax	2017–18	Eredivisie	15	1	–		–		–		15	1
Ajax	2018–19	Eredivisie	29	2	2	1	15 (Note: Appearances in UEFA Champions League)	3	–		46	6
Ajax	2019–20	Eredivisie	24	3	3	0	11 (Note: Ten appearances and two goals in UEFA Champions League, one appearance in UEFA Europa League)	2	0	0	38	5
Ajax	2020–21	Eredivisie	25	1	4	0	11 (Note: Six appearances in UEFA Champions League, five appearances in UEFA Europa League)	0	–		40	1
Ajax	2021–22	Eredivisie	22	2	4	1	3	0	1 (Note: Appearance in Johan Cruyff Shield)	0	30	3
Ajax	Total		115	9	13	2	40	5	1	0	169	16
Lyon	2022–23	Ligue 1	34	1	4	0	–		–		38	1
Lyon	2023–24	Ligue 1	25	3	6	0	–		–		31	3
Lyon	2024–25	Ligue 1	24	3	0	0	9 (Note: Appearances in UEFA Europa League)	2	–		33	5
Lyon	2025–26	Ligue 1	20	0	2	0	8	0	–		30	0
Lyon	2026–27	Ligue 1	4	0	0	0	3 (Note: One appearance in UEFA Champions League, two appearances in UEFA Europa League)	0	–		7	0
Lyon	Total		107	7	12	0	20	2	–		139	9
Career total			424	20	33	3	81	7	6	0	544	30

=== International ===
As of match played 19 July 2026

Appearances and goals by national team and year
National team	Year	Apps	Goals
Argentina	2017	1	0
Argentina	2018	11	0
Argentina	2019	13	0
Argentina	2020	3	0
Argentina	2021	8	0
Argentina	2022	12	0
Argentina	2023	7	1
Argentina	2024	12	0
Argentina	2025	7	0
Argentina	2026	9	0
Total		83	1

As of match played 19 July 2026
Scores and results list Argentina's goal tally first, score column indicates score after each Tagliafico goal.

List of international goals scored by Nicolás Tagliafico
No.	Date	Venue	Cap	Opponent	Score	Result	Competition
1	12 September 2023	Estadio Hernando Siles, La Paz, Bolivia	51	Bolivia	2–0	3–0	2026 FIFA World Cup qualification

== Honours ==
Banfield

- Primera B Nacional: 2013–14

Independiente

- Copa Sudamericana: 2017

Ajax

- Eredivisie: 2018–19, 2020–21, 2021–22
- KNVB Cup: 2018–19, 2020–21

Lyon

- Coupe de France runner-up: 2023–24

Argentina

- FIFA World Cup: 2022; runner-up: 2026
- Copa América: 2021, 2024
- CONMEBOL–UEFA Cup of Champions: 2022

Individual

- South American Team of the Year: 2017
- Eredivisie Player of the Month: November 2018
- Eredivisie Team of the Season: 2018–19
- IFFHS CONMEBOL Team of the Year: 2020
