= Matthijs de Ligt =

Dutch footballer (born 1999)

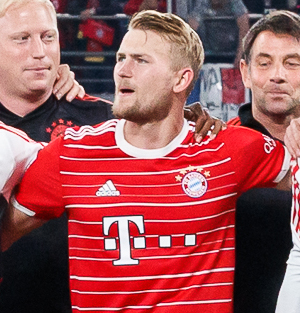
- De Ligt with Bayern Munich in 2022

Personal information
- Full name: Matthijs de Ligt
- Date of birth: 12 August 1999 (age 27)
- Place of birth: Leiderdorp, Netherlands
- Height: 1.87 m (6 ft 2 in)
- Position: Centre-back

Team information
- Current team: Manchester United
- Number: 4

Youth career
- Abcoude
- –2016: Ajax

Senior career*
Years	Team	Apps	(Gls)
2016–2017	Jong Ajax	17	(1)
2016–2019	Ajax	77	(8)
2019–2022	Juventus	87	(8)
2022–2024	Bayern Munich	53	(5)
2024–	Manchester United	43	(3)

International career^{‡}
2014	Netherlands U15	5	(0)
2014–2015	Netherlands U16	8	(0)
2015–2016	Netherlands U17	14	(1)
2016	Netherlands U19	6	(0)
2017–	Netherlands	52	(2)
Medal record
Men's football
Representing Netherlands
UEFA European Championship
Bronze medal – third place	2024 Germany	Team
UEFA Nations League
Runner-up	2019 Portugal	Team
- * Club domestic league appearances and goals as of 20:29, 22 November 2026 (UTC) ‡ National team caps and goals as of 23:41, 17 November 2025 (UTC)

Matthijs de Ligt (born 12 August 1999) is a Dutch professional footballer who plays as a centre-back for Premier League club Manchester United and the Netherlands national team. He is known for his aggressive tackling, aerial ability, leadership and strength.

De Ligt made his debut for Ajax's senior team in September 2016 in a cup game against Willem II. He scored from a corner after 25 minutes, making him the club's second-youngest goalscorer ever behind Clarence Seedorf. On 24 May 2017, De Ligt became the youngest ever player (aged 17 years and 285 days) to appear in a considerable European final when he started against Manchester United in the Europa League final. In December 2018, he won the Golden Boy award given to the year's best footballer in Europe under the age of 21, becoming the first defender to do so. The following season, De Ligt helped Ajax capture a domestic double and reach the semi-finals of the Champions League.

De Ligt's performances earned him a move to Serie A club Juventus in 2019, shortly before being awarded the Kopa Trophy for world's best under-21 player of the year. He would go on to help the Turin side retain the league title in his first season and reclaim the Italian Cup in his second. After three years in Italy, De Ligt would then join Bundesliga champions Bayern Munich in 2022, again capturing a league title in his first season.

In 2017, De Ligt made his senior international debut for the Netherlands at the age of 17, making him the youngest player to start for the national team since 1931. He has earned more than 50 caps, and featured for the side at UEFA Euro 2020 and the 2022 FIFA World Cup.

== Club career ==
=== Ajax ===
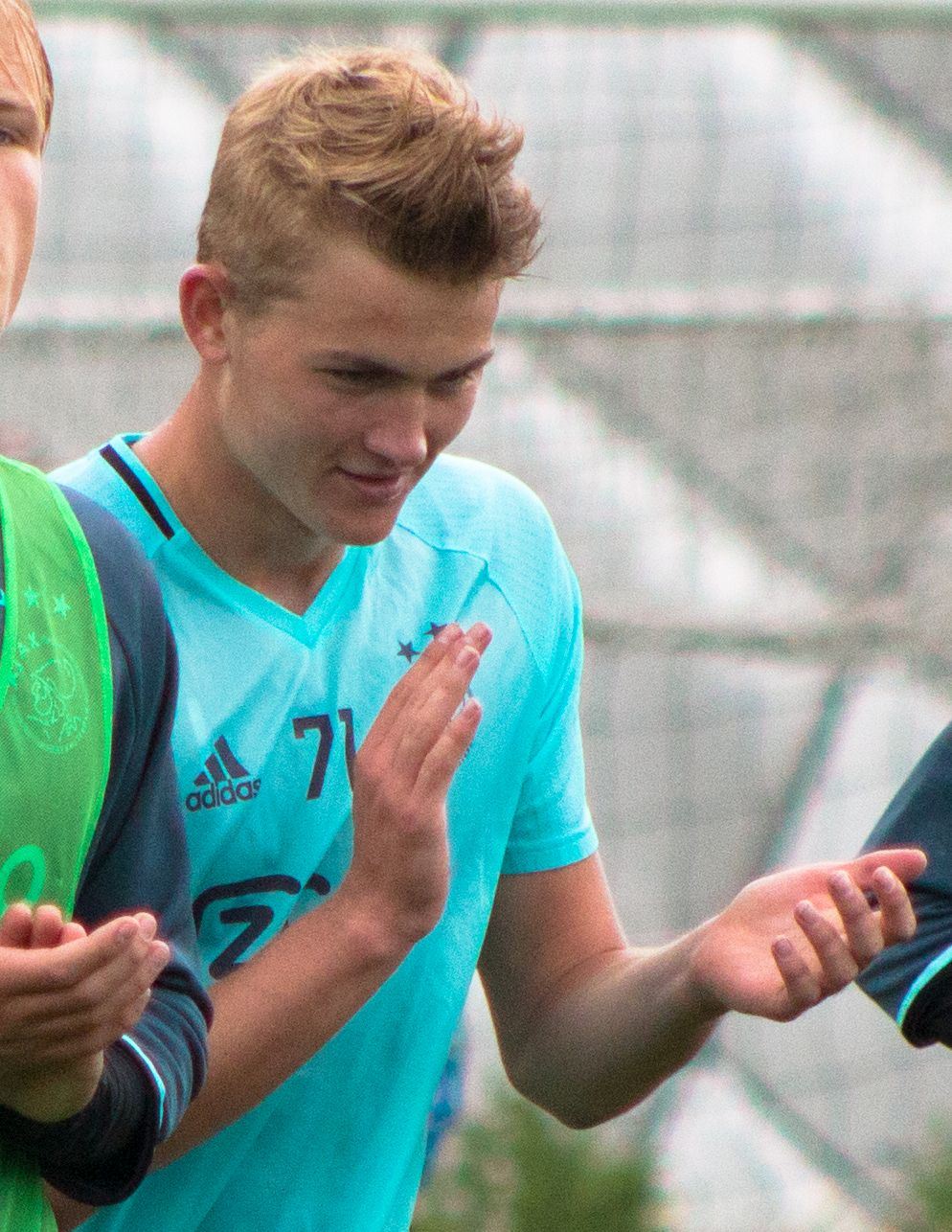
De Ligt in training with Ajax in 2016

De Ligt joined the Ajax youth academy when he was nine years old from his local club in Abcoude, just outside of Amsterdam. At first, the coaches at the youth academy thought he was too slow and out of shape, but he was given a chance to develop in the academy and went on to prove his quality.

==== 2016–17: Jong Ajax and development ====
He made his debut for Jong Ajax on 8 August 2016 in an Eerste Divisie game against Emmen, playing the full game. During the season, De Ligt played in 17 matches for Jong Ajax.

On 21 September, De Ligt made his debut for Ajax's senior team in a cup game against Willem II. He scored from a corner after 25 minutes, making him the second-youngest goalscorer ever behind Clarence Seedorf; Ajax won the game 5–0. On 24 October, Ajax announced through Twitter that De Ligt had been promoted to the senior squad.

De Ligt quickly entrenched himself in the first team after being promoted and went on to play in 11 league matches and nine in the Europa League. On 24 May, he became the youngest player ever (17 years and 285 days old) to play in a major European final when he started against Manchester United in the 2017 UEFA Europa League Final.

==== 2017–19: Breakthrough and captaincy ====
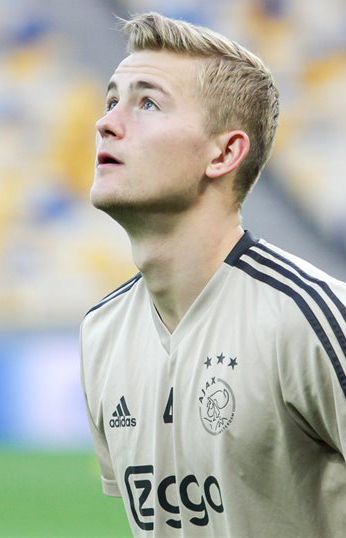
De Ligt in training with Ajax in 2018

After the sale of Davinson Sánchez to Tottenham Hotspur in August 2017, De Ligt became a first-team starter. He was named the youngest captain of Ajax in March 2018 after injury to club captain Joël Veltman.

De Ligt appeared in 37 matches in all competitions and scored three goals. He started in all of his 31 league matches and played 90 minutes in all but one of them (he was substituted in the 33rd minute against Vitesse due to an injury). Due to De Ligt's performances for Ajax, he was linked with many of Europe's top clubs.

On 17 December 2018, De Ligt won the Golden Boy award, becoming the first defender to win the award. On 13 February 2019, De Ligt became the youngest ever captain in a Champions League knockout game at 19 years and 186 days old, in a game against Real Madrid. On 27 February 2019, he played his 100th official game for Ajax in a 0–3 Klassieker win against Feyenoord in the Dutch national cup, becoming the youngest Ajax player ever to reach this milestone.

On 16 April 2019, De Ligt scored the winning goal in the Champions League quarter-final against Juventus to send Ajax on to the semi-finals of the competition for the first time since the 1996–97 edition of the tournament. His goal also saw him become the youngest Dutch player to score in the knockout stages since Nordin Wooter in 1996 and the second-youngest ever defender to score after Joël Matip.

=== Juventus ===
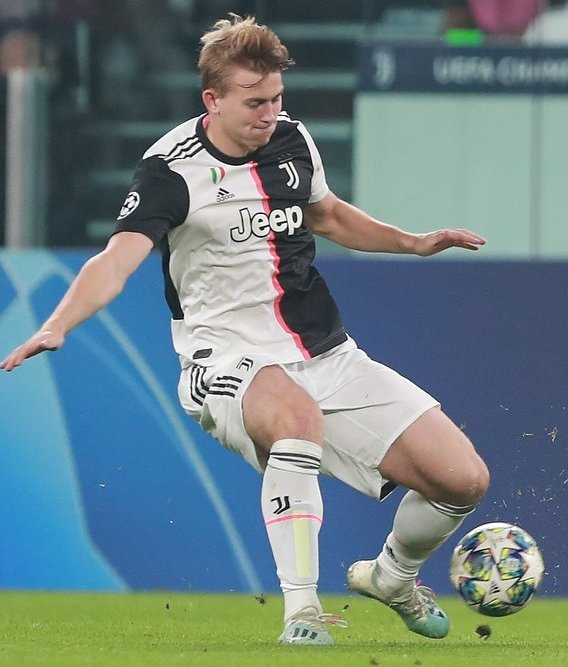
De Ligt playing for Juventus in 2019

On 18 July 2019, De Ligt signed for Serie A champions Juventus on a five-year contract for a fee of €75 million, to be paid in five annual instalments, with additional costs of €10.5 million. He made his official debut for the club in a 4–3 home win over Napoli in Serie A on 31 August. On 3 November, he scored his first for the club in a 1–0 away win over cross-city rivals Torino in the Derby della Mole.

=== Bayern Munich ===
On 19 July 2022, De Ligt signed for Bundesliga champions Bayern Munich on five-year contract for a reported initial fee of €67 million, potentially rising to €77 million in add-ons. On 21 August, he scored his first Bundesliga goal in a 7–0 away win over Bochum.

On 8 March 2023, at the Champions League round of 16-second leg, he made a goal-line clearance against Paris Saint-Germain, after goalkeeper Yann Sommer lost the ball under pressure, to keep the goalless draw and scoreline at 1–0 on aggregate. The match ended in a 2–0 victory and qualification to the quarter-final. On 8 April, he scored the only goal from 25 yards (23 m) in a 1–0 away win over Freiburg, four days after a 2–1 defeat against the same opponent in the DFB-Pokal quarter-finals. That strike was voted Bayern's goal of the month in the Bundesliga. He was also voted player of the month in both March and April.

In the first half of the 2023–24 season, he sustained recurring injuries in his right knee, which led to him being surpassed by Dayot Upamecano and Kim Min-jae in the starting line-up under coach Thomas Tuchel. During the latter part of the season, De Ligt forged a robust partnership with newly acquired Eric Dier, contributing significantly to the club's advancement in the Champions League.

=== Manchester United ===
In the 2024 summer transfer window, De Ligt attracted substantial interest from several top European clubs, particularly Manchester United. On 9 July 2024, it was reported that De Ligt had agreed personal terms with the Manchester side and a transfer looked likely. It was reported a transfer worth an initial €45 million plus €5 million in bonuses was agreed between the two clubs. On 13 August, Manchester United confirmed the transfer, with De Ligt signing a five-year contract. On 16 August, he made his debut for the club in a 1–0 win, as a substitute, against Fulham in the league. On 14 September, he scored his first goal for the club in a 3–0 win against Southampton at St Mary's Stadium in the league.

On 8 November 2025, he scored his first goal of the 2025–26 season, a 96th-minute equaliser against Tottenham Hotspur in a 2–2 draw. Later that year, he sustained a back injury which kept him sidelined for the remainder of the season.

== International career ==
=== Youth ===
De Ligt played youth international football for the Netherlands at under-15, under-16, under-17, and under-19 levels.

=== Senior ===
==== Early senior career ====
On 25 March 2017, De Ligt made his debut for the Dutch senior squad in a 2–0 away defeat against Bulgaria during 2018 FIFA World Cup qualification. At the age of 17, he became the youngest player to start for the national team since 1931. He was sent off in his second appearance, a 2–1 friendly victory against Morocco on 17 May.

During the group stage of the 2018–19 UEFA Nations League, De Ligt started and played 90 minutes in all four matches against Germany and France. On 24 March 2019, De Ligt scored his first goal for the Netherlands in a 3–2 loss against Germany during UEFA Euro 2020 qualifying.

In May 2019, De Ligt was named in the Netherlands' squad for the inaugural Nations League Finals. On 5 June 2019, he scored a header in a 3–1 victory against England at the semi-final stage. Four days later, he started alongside captain Virgil van Dijk in central defence as the Netherlands were defeated 1–0 by hosts Portugal in the final.

==== 2020s ====
De Ligt was a member of the Netherlands' squad for UEFA Euro 2020. After missing the team's opening match against Ukraine, he made his tournament debut against Austria on 17 June 2021. De Ligt was sent off for handball in the Netherlands' 2–0 loss to the Czech Republic at the round of 16 stage on 27 June.

On 14 June 2022, De Ligt served as captain of the Netherlands for the first time in a 3–2 victory against Wales in the 2022–23 UEFA Nations League. In November, he was named in the Dutch squad for the 2022 FIFA World Cup, where he started the team's opening match against Senegal and appeared as a substitute in a 3–1 victory against the United States in the round of 16. After being initially named in the Netherlands' squad for the 2023 UEFA Nations League Finals, De Ligt was forced to withdraw due to a calf injury and was replaced by Daley Blind.

On 29 May 2024, De Ligt was named in the Netherlands' squad for UEFA Euro 2024. However, he did not feature in any match throughout the tournament as the team reached the semi-finals, losing out to England. In May 2026, he underwent a back surgery which ruled him out of the 2026 FIFA World Cup.

== Style of play ==
De Ligt was considered by pundits to be among the most highly regarded young prospects in world football, as demonstrated by his victory in the 2018 Golden Boy award, which is assigned to the most impressive young player in European football.

Having played as an attacking-midfielder in his youth, De Ligt is both a physical and technically gifted right-footed centre-back, who is known for his clean tackling, anticipation, marking, height, strength and accurate passing, which enables him to start attacking plays from the back. His height allows him to be a major threat from set pieces, while his strength means that he is unlikely to be pushed off the ball, particularly in aerial duels. His playing style is often compared to that of Barcelona defender Gerard Piqué; he has also been likened to Jan Vertonghen, due to his "similar forward surges, a propensity to create an extra man in midfield, and calmness on the ball," and to compatriot Ronald Koeman, courtesy of his "powerful shot and body strength."

A 2019 UEFA.com profile described De Ligt as a "natural leader [who] is an elegant two-footed central defender. Dominant in the air, he is blessed with strength, fine distribution and composure, and is able to play out from the back thanks to his confidence in possession, while his intelligent positioning helps him deny pacy forwards. With his ability to read the game, he could even play in midfield. His leadership also stands him out: he was 18 when he was made Ajax skipper." That same year, Paul Wilkes of The Independent wrote that "De Ligt's ability to play out from the back and organise his fellow teammates are valuable commodities in a time when the lack of quality defenders has been highlighted."

Former Liverpool and England defender Jamie Carragher praised De Ligt for his "physical attributes" and "leadership qualities". Carragher also said he plays "like he's 24 or 25" indicating maturity and strength. Of De Ligt, former Netherlands centre-back Jaap Stam said: "He's got composure on the ball, he's aggressive tactically, he sees the game, he reads the game well and he's got that driving force for himself as well in what you need to achieve and where you want to go to." Upon signing with Juventus, Marcello Lippi, one of the club's former managers, said of the defender's precocious performances: "I've seen plenty of greats, like Alessandro Nesta, Franco Baresi, Paolo Maldini, Ciro Ferrara, Fabio Cannavaro, and Marco Materazzi. I've never seen anyone like that at his age."

In 2019, Giacomo Chiuchiolo described De Ligt as a "complete" and talented young defender, saying that although he is not exceptionally quick, he possesses excellent positioning and an ability to read the game, among his other technical and physical qualities. Despite his talent, he has at times come under criticism in the media for being inconsistent due to his tendency to commit occasional lapses or errors. In October 2019, his Juventus defensive teammate Leonardo Bonucci said he believes that De Ligt will overcome these weaknesses with time, as he matures and gains more experience with age, and successfully adapts to the team's new defensive strategy under manager Maurizio Sarri, who uses a zonal marking system rather than man-to-man marking.

== Personal life ==
On 7 June 2024, De Ligt married his long time girlfriend, Annekee Molenaar, a Dutch model and daughter of Keje Molenaar. In July 2025, they split after a year, due to lifestyle incompatibility.

He was childhood friends with Dutch teammate Donyell Malen.

== Career statistics ==
=== Club ===
As of match played 22 November 2026

Appearances and goals by club, season and competition
Club	Season	League			National cup (Note: Includes KNVB Cup, Coppa Italia, DFB-Pokal, FA Cup)		League cup (Note: Includes EFL Cup)		Europe		Other		Total	
Club	Season	Division	Apps	Goals	Apps	Goals	Apps	Goals	Apps	Goals	Apps	Goals	Apps	Goals
Jong Ajax	2016–17	Eerste Divisie	17	1	—		—		—		—		17	1
Ajax	2016–17	Eredivisie	11	2	3	1	—		9 (Note: Appearances in UEFA Europa League)	0	—		23	3
Ajax	2017–18	Eredivisie	33	3	2	0	—		4 (Note: Two appearances in UEFA Champions League, two appearances in UEFA Europa League)	0	—		39	3
Ajax	2018–19	Eredivisie	33	3	5	1	—		17 (Note: Appearances in UEFA Champions League)	3	—		55	7
Ajax	Total		77	8	10	2	—		30	3	—		117	13
Juventus	2019–20	Serie A	29	4	4	0	—		6	0	0	0	39	4
Juventus	2020–21	Serie A	27	1	4	0	—		5	0	0	0	36	1
Juventus	2021–22	Serie A	31	3	4	0	—		7	0	0	0	42	3
Juventus	Total		87	8	12	0	—		18	0	0	0	117	8
Bayern Munich	2022–23	Bundesliga	31	3	4	0	—		7	0	1 (Note: Appearance in DFL-Supercup)	0	43	3
Bayern Munich	2023–24	Bundesliga	22	2	1	0	—		6	0	1	0	30	2
Bayern Munich	Total		53	5	5	0	—		13	0	2	0	73	5
Manchester United	2024–25	Premier League	29	2	2	0	2	0	9	0	—		42	2
Manchester United	2025–26	Premier League	13	1	0	0	1	0	—		—		14	1
Manchester United	2026–27	Premier League	1	0	0	0	0	0	2	0	—		3	0
Manchester United	Total		43	3	2	0	3	0	11	0	—		59	3
Career total			277	25	29	2	3	0	72	3	2	0	383	30

=== International ===
As of match played 17 November 2025

Appearances and goals by national team and year
National team	Year	Apps	Goals
Netherlands	2017	3	0
Netherlands	2018	10	0
Netherlands	2019	10	2
Netherlands	2021	10	0
Netherlands	2022	7	0
Netherlands	2023	3	0
Netherlands	2024	6	0
Netherlands	2025	3	0
Total		52	2

As of match played 17 November 2025
Scores and results list the Netherlands' goal tally first, score column indicates score after each De Ligt goal.

List of international goals scored by Matthijs de Ligt
No.	Date	Venue	Cap	Opponent	Score	Result	Competition	Ref.
1	24 March 2019	Johan Cruyff Arena, Amsterdam, Netherlands	15	Germany	1–2	2–3	UEFA Euro 2020 qualifying	
2	6 June 2019	Estádio D. Afonso Henriques, Guimarães, Portugal	16	England	1–1	3–1 (a.e.t.)	2019 UEFA Nations League Finals	

== Honours ==
Ajax

- Eredivisie: 2018–19
- KNVB Cup: 2018–19
- UEFA Europa League runner-up: 2016–17

Juventus

- Serie A: 2019–20
- Coppa Italia: 2020–21; runner-up: 2019–20, 2021–22

Bayern Munich

- Bundesliga: 2022–23
- DFL-Supercup: 2022

Manchester United

- UEFA Europa League runner-up: 2024–25

Netherlands

- UEFA Nations League runner-up: 2019

Individual

- ABN AMRO Future Cup Best Player: 2015
- Copa Amsterdam Best Player: 2015
- Ajax Talent of the Future (Sjaak Swart Award): 2016
- UEFA European Under-17 Championship Team of the Tournament: 2016
- Ajax Talent of the Year (Marco van Basten Award): 2018
- UEFA Europa League Squad of the Season: 2016–17
- UEFA Champions League Squad of the Season: 2018–19
- Eredivisie Team of the Year: 2017–18, 2018–19
- Johan Cruyff Trophy: 2017–18
- Dutch Footballer of the Year: 2018–19
- Golden Boy: 2018
- FIFA FIFPro World11: 2019
- IFFHS Men's World Team: 2019
- Kopa Trophy: 2019
- UEFA Team of the Year: 2019
- UEFA Nations League Finals Team of the Tournament: 2019
- Bundesliga Rookie of the Month: April 2023
- Bundesliga Team of the Season: 2022–23
- VDV Bundesliga Team of the Season: 2022–23
- Bundesliga Goal of the Season: 2022–23
