= 2018–19 Eredivisie =

63rd season of the Eredivisie

Eredivisie
- Season: 2018–19
- Dates: 10 August 2018 – 15 May 2019
- Champions: Ajax (34th title)
- Relegated: NAC Breda; De Graafschap; Excelsior
- Champions League: Ajax; PSV Eindhoven
- Europa League: Feyenoord; AZ; FC Utrecht
- Matches: 306
- Goals: 1,061 (3.47 per match)
- Top goalscorer: Luuk de Jong; Dušan Tadić (28 goals each)
- Biggest home win: Ajax 8–0 De Graafschap (16 December 2018)
- Biggest away win: ADO Den Haag 0–7 PSV Eindhoven (15 September 2018)
- Highest scoring: Heracles Almelo 4–5 Excelsior (12 May 2019)
- Longest winning run: 13 matches PSV Eindhoven
- Longest unbeaten run: 13 matches PSV Eindhoven
- Longest winless run: 10 matches Excelsior; NAC Breda
- Longest losing run: 7 matches Excelsior
- Highest attendance: 53,720
- Lowest attendance: 3,811
- Total attendance: 5,509,186
- Average attendance: 18,004

The 2018–19 Eredivisie was the 63rd season of the Eredivisie since its establishment in 1955. The season began on 10 August 2018 and concluded on 15 May 2019; the Europa League and relegation play-offs will take place later that month. PSV were the defending champions. Emmen, De Graafschap and Fortuna Sittard joined as the promoted clubs from the 2017–18 Eerste Divisie. They replaced Sparta Rotterdam, Twente and Roda JC who were relegated to the 2018–19 Eerste Divisie.

== Teams ==
A total of 18 teams took part in the league: The best fifteen teams from the 2017–18 season, two promotion/relegation playoff winners (FC Emmen and De Graafschap) and the 2017–18 Eerste Divisie runners-up (Fortuna Sittard). FC Emmen will play in the Eredivisie for the first time in their history.

Locations of the 2018–19 Eredivisie teams
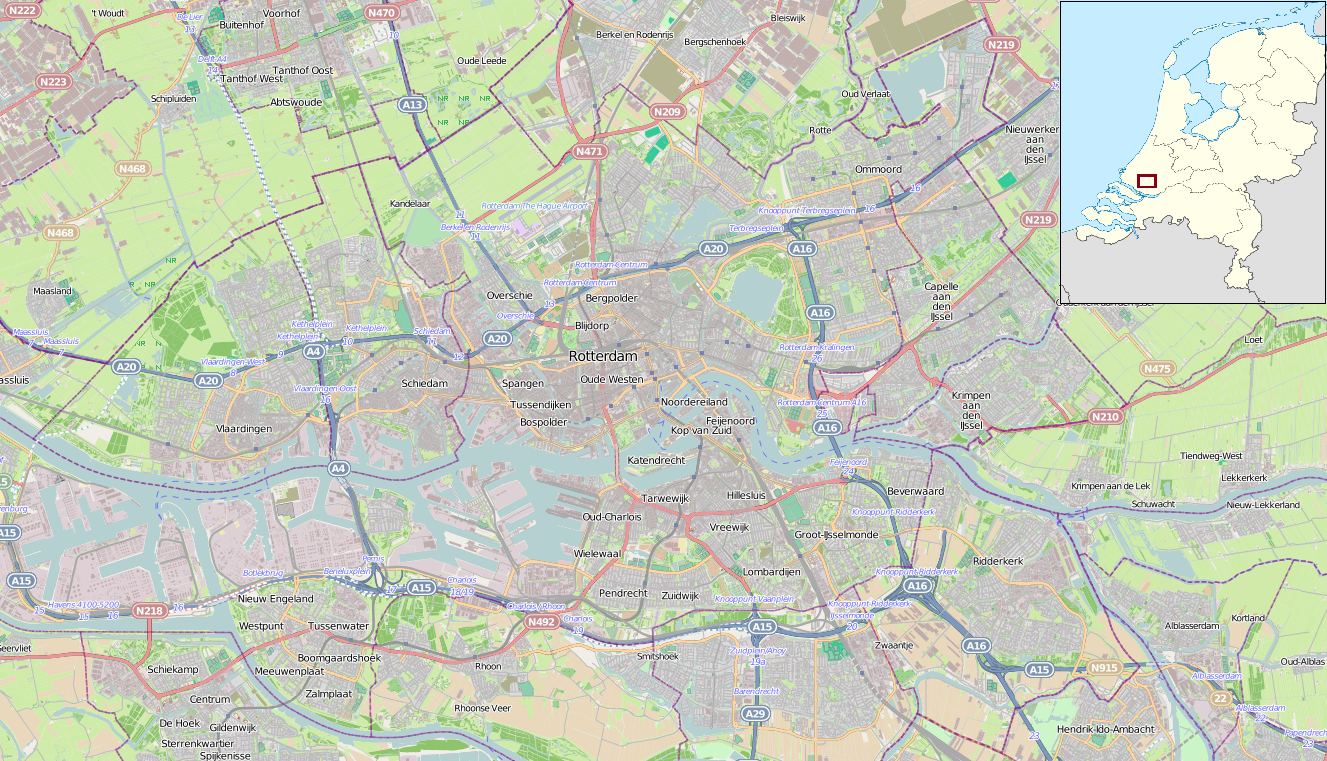
Rotterdam Eredivisie football clubs

=== Stadiums and locations ===
Club	Location	Venue	Capacity
ADO Den Haag	The Hague	Cars Jeans Stadion	15,000
Ajax	Amsterdam	Johan Cruyff Arena	54,990
AZ	Alkmaar	AFAS Stadion	17,023
De Graafschap	Doetinchem	De Vijverberg	12,600
Emmen	Emmen	De Oude Meerdijk	8,600
Excelsior	Rotterdam	Van Donge & De Roo Stadion	4,500
Feyenoord	Rotterdam	De Kuip	51,177
Fortuna Sittard	Sittard	Fortuna Sittard Stadion	10,300
Groningen	Groningen	Noordlease Stadion	22,550
Heerenveen	Heerenveen	Abe Lenstra Stadion	27,224
Heracles Almelo	Almelo	Polman Stadion	12,080
NAC Breda	Breda	Rat Verlegh Stadion	19,000
PEC Zwolle	Zwolle	MAC³PARK Stadion	14,000
PSV	Eindhoven	Philips Stadion	36,500
Utrecht	Utrecht	Stadion Galgenwaard	23,750
Vitesse	Arnhem	GelreDome	21,248
VVV-Venlo	Venlo	Seacon Stadion – De Koel	8,000
Willem II	Tilburg	Koning Willem II Stadion	14,500

=== Personnel and kits ===
Note: Flags indicate national team as has been defined under FIFA eligibility rules. Players and managers may hold more than one non-FIFA nationality.

Team	Manager	Captain	Kit manufacturer	Shirt sponsor
ADO Den Haag	(Netherlands) Alfons Groenendijk	(Netherlands) Aaron Meijers	Erreà	Cars Jeans
Ajax	(Netherlands) Erik ten Hag	(Netherlands) Matthijs de Ligt	Adidas	Ziggo
AZ	(Netherlands) John van den Brom	(Netherlands) Guus Til	Under Armour	AFAS Software
De Graafschap	(Netherlands) Henk de Jong	(Netherlands) Sven Nieuwpoort	Nike	Flexfactory
Emmen	(Netherlands) Dick Lukkien	(Netherlands) Anco Jansen	Beltona	Noordlease
Excelsior	(Netherlands) André Hoekstra	(Netherlands) Ryan Koolwijk	Quick	DSW Zorgverzekeraar
Feyenoord	(Netherlands) Giovanni van Bronckhorst	(Netherlands) Robin van Persie	Adidas	Qurrent
Fortuna Sittard	(Netherlands) René Eijer	(Netherlands) Wessel Dammers	Masita	Sparr Finance
Groningen	(Netherlands) Danny Buijs	(Netherlands) Mike te Wierik	Puma	Payt
Heerenveen	(Netherlands) Johnny Jansen	(Netherlands) Stijn Schaars	Jako	GroenLeven
Heracles	(Germany) Frank Wormuth	(Netherlands) Robin Pröpper	Acerbis	Asito
NAC Breda	(Netherlands) Ruud Brood	(Netherlands) Menno Koch	Legea	CM Payments
PEC Zwolle	(Netherlands) Jaap Stam	(Netherlands) Bram van Polen	Craft	Molecaten
PSV	(Netherlands) Mark van Bommel	(Netherlands) Luuk de Jong	Umbro	Energiedirect.nl
Utrecht	(Netherlands) Dick Advocaat	(Netherlands) Willem Janssen	Hummel	Zorg van de zaak
Vitesse	(Russia) Leonid Slutsky	(Netherlands) Maikel van der Werff	Macron	Droomparken
VVV-Venlo	(Netherlands) Maurice Steijn	(Netherlands) Danny Post	Masita	Seacon Logistics
Willem II	(Netherlands) Adrie Koster	(Netherlands) Jordens Peters	Robey	Destil

=== Managerial changes ===
Team	Outgoing manager	Manner of departure	Date of vacancy	Position in table	Replaced by	Date of appointment
Excelsior	(Netherlands) Mitchell van der Gaag	End of contract	1 July 2018	Pre-season	(Netherlands) Adrie Poldervaart	1 July 2018
Fortuna Sittard	(Portugal) Cláudio Braga	End of interim spell	1 July 2018	Pre-season	(Netherlands) René Eijer	1 July 2018
Groningen	(Netherlands) Ernest Faber	End of contract	1 July 2018	Pre-season	(Netherlands) Danny Buijs	1 July 2018
Heerenveen	(Netherlands) Jurgen Streppel	End of contract	1 July 2018	Pre-season	(Netherlands) Jan Olde Riekerink	1 July 2018
Heracles Almelo	(Netherlands) John Stegeman	End of contract	1 July 2018	Pre-season	(Germany) Frank Wormuth	1 July 2018
NAC Breda	(Belgium) Stijn Vreven	End of contract	1 July 2018	Pre-season	(Netherlands) Mitchell van der Gaag	1 July 2018
PSV	(Netherlands) Phillip Cocu	Signed by Fenerbahçe	1 July 2018	Pre-season	(Netherlands) Mark van Bommel	1 July 2018
Vitesse	(Netherlands) Edward Sturing	End of interim spell	1 July 2018	Pre-season	(Russia) Leonid Slutsky	1 July 2018
Willem II	(Netherlands) Reinier Robbemond	End of interim spell	1 July 2018	Pre-season	(Netherlands) Adrie Koster	1 July 2018
FC Utrecht	(Netherlands) Jean-Paul de Jong	Sacked	4 September 2018	11th	(Netherlands) Dick Advocaat	12 September 2018
PEC Zwolle	(Netherlands) John van 't Schip	Sacked	19 December 2018	15th	(Netherlands) Jaap Stam	28 December 2018
NAC Breda	(Netherlands) Mitchell van der Gaag	Resigned	18 March 2019	18th	(Netherlands) Ruud Brood	25 March 2019
Excelsior	(Netherlands) Adrie Poldervaart	Resigned	4 April 2019	15th	(Netherlands) André Hoekstra	4 April 2019
Heerenveen	(Netherlands) Jan Olde Riekerink	Sacked	10 April 2019	10th	(Netherlands) Johnny Jansen (caretaker)	10 April 2019

== Standings ==
Pos	Team	Pld	W	D	L	GF	GA	GD	Pts	Qualification or relegation
1	Ajax (C)	34	28	2	4	119	32	+87	86	Qualification for the Champions League third qualifying round
2	PSV Eindhoven	34	26	5	3	98	26	+72	83	Qualification for the Champions League second qualifying round
3	Feyenoord	34	20	5	9	75	41	+34	65	Qualification for the Europa League third qualifying round (Note: Since the winners of the 2018–19 KNVB Cup, Ajax, qualified for European competition based on league position, the spot awarded to the KNVB Cup winners (Europa League third qualifying round) was passed to the third-placed team and the spot awarded to the third-placed team (Europa League second qualifying round) was passed to the fourth-placed team.)
4	AZ	34	17	7	10	64	43	+21	58	Qualification for the Europa League second qualifying round
5	Vitesse	34	14	11	9	70	51	+19	53	Qualification for the European competition play-offs (Note: Four teams play for a spot in the 2019–20 UEFA Europa League second qualifying round.)
6	Utrecht (O)	34	15	8	11	60	51	+9	53	Qualification for the European competition play-offs
7	Heracles Almelo	34	15	3	16	61	68	−7	48	Qualification for the European competition play-offs
8	Groningen	34	13	6	15	39	41	−2	45	Qualification for the European competition play-offs
9	ADO Den Haag	34	12	9	13	58	63	−5	45	
10	Willem II	34	13	5	16	58	72	−14	44	
11	Heerenveen	34	10	11	13	64	73	−9	41	
12	VVV-Venlo	34	11	8	15	47	63	−16	41	
13	PEC Zwolle	34	11	6	17	44	57	−13	39	
14	Emmen	34	10	8	16	41	72	−31	38	
15	Fortuna Sittard	34	9	7	18	50	80	−30	34	
16	Excelsior (R)	34	9	6	19	46	79	−33	33	Qualification for the Relegation play-offs (Note: Ten teams, two from the Eredivisie and eight from the Eerste Divisie, play for two spots in the 2019–20 Eredivisie. The remaining eight teams play in the 2019–20 Eerste Divisie.)
17	De Graafschap (R)	34	8	5	21	38	75	−37	29	Qualification for the Relegation play-offs
18	NAC Breda (R)	34	5	8	21	29	74	−45	23	Relegation to Eerste Divisie

Source: eredivisie.nl
Rules for classification: Season in progress: 1) Most points won; 2) Less points lost; 3) Goal difference; 4) Goals scored; 5) Alphabetical order; End of season: 1) Points; 2) Goal difference; 3) Goals scored; 4) Head-to-head points; 5) Head-to-head goal difference; 6) Head-to-head away goals scored; 7) Play-off if relevant for deciding champion, relegation or participating in a European league, otherwise by draw. 8) Penalty shoot-out (only after a play-off)
(C) Champions; (O) Play-off winners; (R) Relegated

== Results ==
Home \ Away	ADO	AJA	AZ	EMM	EXC	FEY	FOR	GRA	GRO	HEE	HER	NAC	PEC	PSV	UTR	VIT	VVV	WIL
ADO Den Haag		1–5	0–1	1–2	3–1	2–2	3–1	0–0	1–0	2–3	2–0	1–1	1–0	0–7	5–0	3–3	2–4	6–2
Ajax	5–1		5–0	5–0	6–2	3–0	4–0	8–0	3–0	4–4	1–1	5–0	2–1	3–1	4–1	4–2	6–0	2–0
AZ	2–3	1–0		5–0	2–1	1–1	4–2	1–0	1–0	2–3	2–1	5–0	2–2	1–0	3–0	0–0	3–0	0–2
Emmen	3–2	2–5	1–4		1–2	1–4	3–3	1–1	1–0	2–0	1–1	2–0	0–1	2–2	2–0	0–3	1–1	0–2
Excelsior	2–4	1–7	4–2	2–1		2–1	1–1	2–0	2–4	3–3	0–3	1–2	0–2	0–2	3–3	2–0	1–0	1–1
Feyenoord	0–2	6–2	2–1	4–0	3–0		0–2	4–0	1–0	3–0	2–1	4–2	3–0	2–1	1–0	2–1	4–1	2–3
Fortuna Sittard	0–0	0–2	0–3	3–1	4–1	1–4		3–1	0–0	2–4	3–0	2–1	3–0	1–2	1–1	2–1	1–1	4–4
De Graafschap	1–1	1–4	1–1	1–0	4–1	2–0	5–1		0–1	0–5	1–2	3–0	0–2	1–4	0–1	2–2	1–2	2–1
Groningen	1–0	0–1	1–3	1–2	1–0	1–0	3–0	1–0		2–0	3–0	5–2	0–1	1–2	1–1	2–1	3–2	0–1
Heerenveen	1–1	0–4	0–2	1–1	1–0	3–5	3–1	0–3	1–1		3–5	2–1	1–1	2–2	2–3	1–1	2–2	4–2
Heracles Almelo	4–2	1–0	3–2	2–1	4–5	0–2	6–0	4–0	4–1	2–1		1–0	0–2	0–4	1–5	3–2	4–1	3–4
NAC Breda	1–1	0–3	0–3	1–1	0–2	0–4	2–3	3–0	0–0	4–2	2–1		0–0	0–2	0–4	2–1	1–1	2–2
PEC Zwolle	2–3	1–4	0–0	3–0	2–0	3–1	5–0	0–3	3–2	2–3	1–1	0–0		1–2	4–3	0–2	2–4	2–3
PSV Eindhoven	3–1	3–0	3–1	6–0	6–0	1–1	5–0	2–1	2–1	3–0	3–1	2–0	4–0		4–0	1–0	4–0	6–1
Utrecht	3–0	1–3	2–1	1–2	0–0	3–2	2–1	5–0	0–0	3–1	3–1	2–1	2–0	2–2		0–0	1–1	0–1
Vitesse	1–1	0–4	2–2	1–1	3–2	1–1	2–1	6–1	5–1	2–2	4–0	4–1	4–1	3–3	2–1		2–1	3–2
VVV-Venlo	2–0	0–1	2–2	2–3	1–0	0–3	3–2	4–1	0–0	1–1	0–1	3–0	2–0	0–1	2–6	1–3		2–1
Willem II	0–3	1–4	2–1	2–3	2–2	1–1	3–2	3–2	1–2	1–5	5–0	2–0	2–0	0–3	0–1	1–3	0–1	

Source: eredivisie.nl
Legend: Blue = home team win; Yellow = draw; Red = away team win.
For upcoming matches, an "a" indicates there is an article about the rivalry between the two participants.

== Season statistics ==
=== Top scorers ===
Rank	Player	Club	Games	Goals	Penalties	Average
1	(Netherlands) Luuk de Jong	PSV Eindhoven	34	28	0	0.82
1	(Serbia) Dušan Tadić	Ajax	34	28	11	0.82
3	(Spain) Adrián Dalmau	Heracles Almelo	31	19	0	0.61
4	(Mexico) Hirving Lozano	PSV Eindhoven	30	17	4	0.57
4	(Netherlands) Abdenasser El Khayati	ADO Den Haag	33	17	6	0.52
6	(Netherlands) Robin van Persie	Feyenoord	25	16	0	0.64
6	(Netherlands) Klaas-Jan Huntelaar	Ajax	28	16	1	0.57
6	(Morocco) Hakim Ziyech	Ajax	29	16	0	0.55
6	(Netherlands) Sam Lammers	Heerenveen	31	16	5	0.52
6	(Netherlands) Michel Vlap	Heerenveen	34	16	0	0.47

Source: nos.nl

=== Hat-tricks ===
Round	Player	Club	Goals	Date	Home	Score	Away
3	(Spain) Fran Sol	Willem II	34', 52' (p), 70'	26 August 2018	Willem II	5–0	Heracles Almelo
4	(Netherlands) Abdenasser El Khayati	ADO Den Haag	21' (p), 45+1', 65', 69'	1 September 2018	Excelsior	2–4	ADO Den Haag
16	(Netherlands) Daley Blind	Ajax	65', 74', 90'	16 December 2018	Ajax	8–0	De Graafschap
16	(Morocco) Hakim Ziyech	Ajax	32', 62', 69'	16 December 2018	Ajax	8–0	De Graafschap
18	(Netherlands) Fabian Serrarens	De Graafschap	27', 30', 66'	20 January 2019	De Graafschap	5–1	Fortuna Sittard
20	(Netherlands) Luuk de Jong	PSV Eindhoven	54', 76', 87'	3 February 2019	PSV Eindhoven	5–0	Fortuna Sittard
22	(Spain) Adrián Dalmau	Heracles Almelo	1', 51', 60', 78'	16 February 2019	Heracles Almelo	6–0	Fortuna Sittard
24	(Netherlands) Robin van Persie	Feyenoord	38', 52', 62'	3 March 2019	Feyenoord	4–0	Emmen
27	(Sweden) Alexander Isak	Willem II	44' (p), 58' (p), 61' (p)	30 March 2019	Willem II	3–2	Fortuna Sittard
27	(Netherlands) Thomas Buitink	Vitesse	21', 27', 43'	30 March 2019	ADO Den Haag	3–3	Vitesse
30	(Netherlands) Klaas-Jan Huntelaar	Ajax	10', 40', 65'	13 April 2019	Ajax	6–2	Excelsior
31	(Netherlands) Bryan Linssen	Vitesse	9', 47', 77'	20 April 2019	Vitesse	4–1	PEC Zwolle
33	(Spain) Adrián Dalmau	Heracles Almelo	23', 51', 59'	12 May 2019	Heracles Almelo	4–5	Excelsior
33	(Iceland) Elías Már Ómarsson	Excelsior	4', 45', 90+1'	12 May 2019	Heracles Almelo	4–5	Excelsior
33	(Togo) Peniel Mlapa	VVV-Venlo	54', 57', 75'	12 May 2019	PEC Zwolle	2–4	VVV-Venlo

=== Assists ===
Rank	Player	Club	Games	Assists	Average
1	(Morocco) Hakim Ziyech	Ajax	29	13	0.45
1	(Serbia) Dušan Tadić	Ajax	34	13	0.38
3	(Netherlands) Steven Berghuis	Feyenoord	33	12	0.36
3	(Netherlands) Steven Bergwijn	PSV Eindhoven	33	12	0.36
3	(Netherlands) Abdenasser El Khayati	ADO Den Haag	33	12	0.36
6	(Norway) Martin Ødegaard	Vitesse	31	10	0.32
6	(Curaçao) Brandley Kuwas	Heracles Almelo	33	10	0.3
6	(Netherlands) Donny van de Beek	Ajax	34	10	0.29
9	(Kosovo) Arbër Zeneli	Heerenveen	17	9	0.53
9	(Spain) Angeliño	PSV Eindhoven	34	9	0.26

Source: nos.nl

=== Discipline ===
Player with the most yellow cards: 11

- Tom Beugelsdijk (ADO Den Haag)

Players with the most red cards: 2

- José Rodríguez (Fortuna Sittard)
- Morten Thorsby (SC Heerenveen)
- Urby Emanuelson (FC Utrecht)
- Fabian Serrarens (De Graafschap)
- Jesper Drost (Heracles Almelo)
- Maikel van der Werff (Vitesse)
- Mounir El Allouchi (NAC Breda)
- Danilho Doekhi (Vitesse)

Updated to match(es) played on 8 April 2019.

== Awards ==
=== Monthly awards ===
Month	Player of the Month		Talent of the Month		Ref.
Month	Player	Club	Player	Club	Ref.
August	(Netherlands) Robin van Persie	Feyenoord	(Netherlands) Steven Bergwijn	PSV	
September	(Sweden) Kristoffer Peterson	Heracles	(Spain) Angeliño	PSV	
October	(Morocco) Hakim Ziyech	Ajax	(Netherlands) Michel Vlap	Heerenveen	
November	(Argentina) Nicolás Tagliafico	Ajax	(Morocco) Noussair Mazraoui	Ajax	
December	(Netherlands) Frenkie de Jong	Ajax	(Netherlands) Steven Bergwijn	PSV	
January	(Netherlands) Patrick Joosten	VVV-Venlo	(Netherlands) Sam Lammers	Heerenveen	
February	(Netherlands) Frenkie de Jong	Ajax	(Greece) Lazaros Lamprou	Fortuna Sittard	
March	(Serbia) Dušan Tadić	Ajax	(Sweden) Alexander Isak	Willem II	
April	(Norway) Martin Ødegaard	Vitesse	(Netherlands) Tyrell Malacia	Feyenoord	
May	(Iceland) Elías Már Ómarsson	Excelsior	(Norway) Martin Ødegaard	Vitesse	

=== Annual awards ===
Award	Player	Club	Ref.
Player of the Season	(Netherlands) Frenkie de Jong	Ajax	
Talent of the Season	(Spain) Angeliño	PSV	

Team of the Season
Goalkeeper	(Cameroon) André Onana (Ajax)			
Defence	(Netherlands) Denzel Dumfries (PSV)	(Netherlands) Matthijs de Ligt (Ajax)	(Netherlands) Daley Blind (Ajax)	(Spain) Angeliño (PSV)
Midfield	(Norway) Martin Ødegaard (Vitesse)	(Denmark) Lasse Schöne (Ajax)		(Netherlands) Frenkie de Jong (Ajax)
Attack	(Morocco) Hakim Ziyech (Ajax)	(Netherlands) Luuk de Jong (PSV)		(Serbia) Dušan Tadić (Ajax)
Bench	(Netherlands) Marco Bizot (AZ) (Argentina) Nicolás Tagliafico (Ajax) (Netherlands) Nick Viergever (PSV) (Netherlands) Abdenasser El Khayati (ADO Den Haag) (South Africa) Thulani Serero (Vitesse) (Denmark) Younes Namli (PEC Zwolle) (Spain) Adrián Dalmau (Heracles) (Netherlands) Steven Berghuis (Feyenoord) (Netherlands) Steven Bergwijn (PSV)			

== Play-offs ==
=== European competition ===
Four teams played for a spot in the 2019–20 UEFA Europa League second qualifying round.

Semi-finals
Heracles Almelo	0	0	0
FC Utrecht	2	3	5
FC Groningen	2	1	3
Vitesse	1	3	4

Final
FC Utrecht*	1	2	3
Vitesse	1	0	1

Key: * = Play-off winners, (a) = Wins because of away goals rule, (e) = Wins after extra time in second leg, (p) = Wins after penalty shoot-out.

== Promotion/relegation play-offs ==
Ten teams, two from the Eredivisie and eight from the Eerste Divisie, played for two spots in the 2019–20 Eredivisie, the remaining eight teams playing in the 2019–20 Eerste Divisie.

First round
NEC	2	0	2
RKC Waalwijk	0	3	3
SC Cambuur	2	2	4
Almere City	2	1	3

Second round
RKC Waalwijk	2	1	3
Excelsior	1	1	2
Go Ahead Eagles	2	1	3
FC Den Bosch	2	0	2
TOP Oss	0	0	0
Sparta Rotterdam	2	3	5
SC Cambuur	1	0	1
De Graafschap	1	2	3

Third round
RKC Waalwijk*	0	5	5
Go Ahead Eagles	0	4	4
Sparta Rotterdam*	1	2	3
De Graafschap	2	0	2

Key: * = Play-off winners, (a) = Wins because of away goals rule, (e) = Wins after extra time in second leg, (p) = Wins after penalty shoot-out.

== Attendances ==
#	Football club	Home games	Average attendance
1	AFC Ajax	17	52,961
2	Feyenoord	17	41,771
3	PSV	17	34,071
4	FC Utrecht	17	18,841
5	sc Heerenveen	17	18,743
6	NAC Breda	17	18,262
7	FC Groningen	17	17,744
8	AZ	17	15,133
9	Vitesse	17	15,065
10	PEC Zwolle	17	13,478
11	Willem II	17	12,998
12	ADO Den Haag	17	12,561
13	De Graafschap	17	12,321
14	Heracles Almelo	17	10,992
15	Fortuna Sittard	17	9,100
16	FC Emmen	17	8,262
17	VVV-Venlo	17	6,828
18	Excelsior	17	4,214
