= Jethro Mashart =

Dutch footballer (born 2000)

Personal information
- Date of birth: 8 May 2000 (age 26)
- Place of birth: Rotterdam, Netherlands
- Height: 1.75 m (5 ft 9 in)
- Position: Left-back

Team information
- Current team: SteDoCo
- Number: 13

Youth career
- –2014: Spartaan '20
- 2014–2018: NAC Breda

Senior career*
Years	Team	Apps	(Gls)
2018–2023	NAC Breda	61	(1)
2023–2025	Kozakken Boys	45	(0)
2025–	SteDoCo	0	(0)
- * Club domestic league appearances and goals as of 01:43, 4 August 2025 (UTC)

Jethro Mashart (born 8 May 2000) is a Dutch professional footballer who plays as a left-back for Vierde Divisie club SteDoCo.

== Club career ==
Mashart made his Eredivisie debut for NAC Breda on 24 November 2018 in a game against Ajax.

On 26 July 2023, Mashart joined Kozakken Boys in the third-tier Tweede Divisie for one season.

== Personal life ==
Mashart was born in the Netherlands and is of Surinamese descent.
