= 2019 KNVB Cup final =

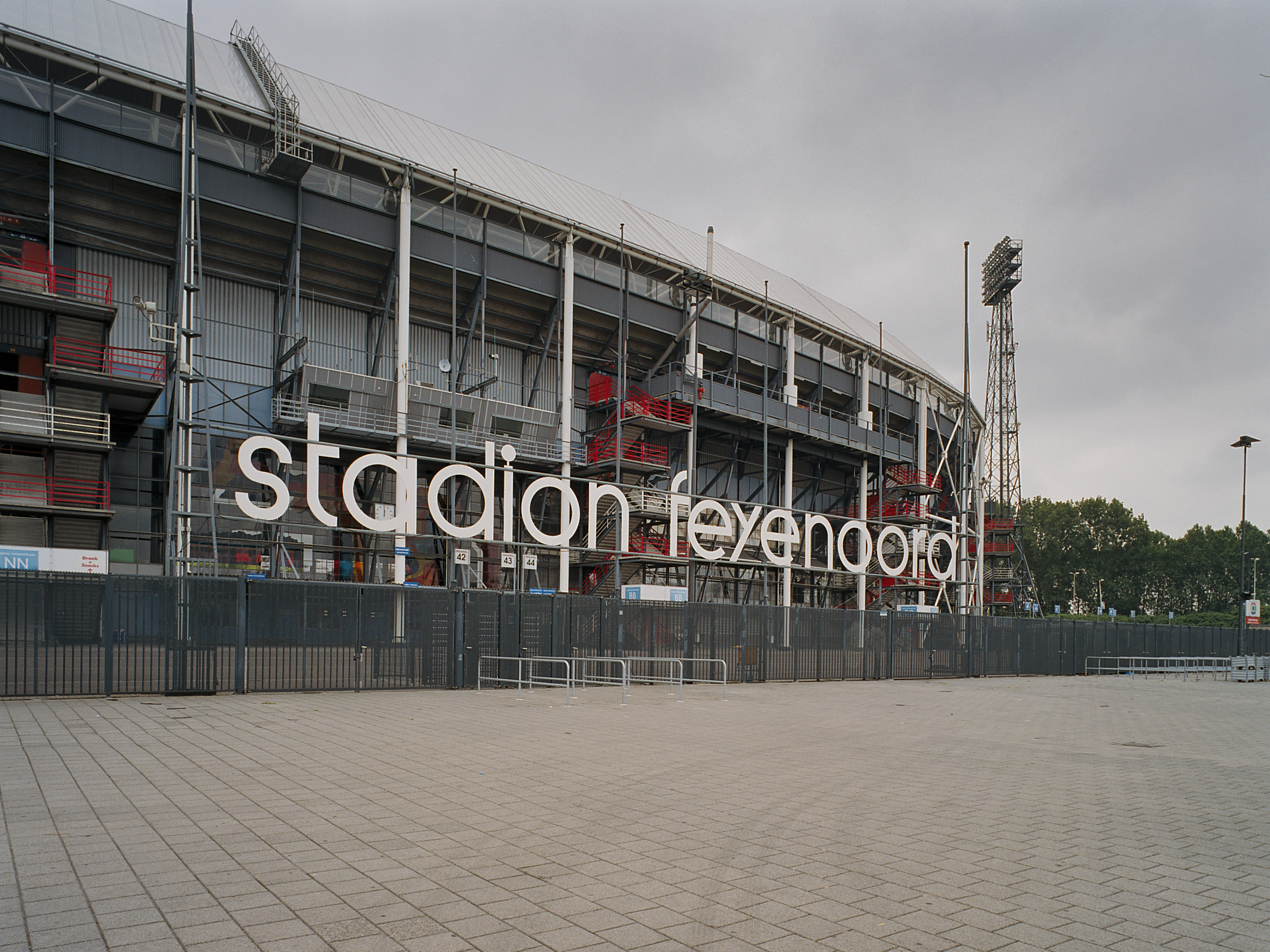
- De Kuip in Rotterdam hosted the final.
- Event: 2018–19 KNVB Cup
Willem II	Ajax
0	4
- Date: 5 May 2019
- Venue: De Kuip, Rotterdam
- Referee: Serdar Gözübüyük
- Attendance: 45,709

The 2019 KNVB Cup final was a football match between Eredivisie clubs Willem II and Ajax that took place on 5 May 2019 at De Kuip, Rotterdam. It was the final match of the 2018–19 KNVB Cup, the 101st season of the annual Dutch national football cup competition.

The winners of this match would compete in the 2019 Johan Cruyff Shield and play in the 2019–20 UEFA Europa League, assuming they have not qualified for the 2019–20 UEFA Champions League. Since Ajax had qualified for the latter as 2018–19 Eredivisie champions, the spot for the winners reverted to the league.

== Route to the final ==
Willem II		Round	Ajax	
Opponent	Result		Opponent	Result
FC Volendam	2–1 (A)	First round	HVV Te Werve	7–0 (A)
SV Spakenburg	5–0 (H)	Second round	Go Ahead Eagles	3–0 (H)
AFC	3–0 (H)	Round of 16	Roda JC	1–1 (4–2 pen.) (A)
FC Twente	3–2 (A)	Quarter-finals	SC Heerenveen	3–1 (H)
AZ Alkmaar	1–1 (2–1 pen.) (H)	Semi-finals	Feyenoord	3–0 (A)

== Match ==
=== Details ===
5 May 2019
18:00 CEST

Willem II	0–4	Ajax
	Report	Blind 38'; Huntelaar 39', 67'; Kristensen 76'

De Kuip, Rotterdam
Attendance: 45,709
Referee: Serdar Gözübüyük

Willem II	Ajax

GK	1	(Germany) Timon Wellenreuther
RB	2	(Netherlands) Fernando Lewis
CB	25	(Germany) Thomas Meißner
CB	4	(Netherlands) Jordens Peters (c)		(substituted off) 62'
LB	3	(Netherlands) Freek Heerkens
RM	15	(Netherlands) Damil Dankerlui		(substituted off) 62'
CM	26	(Peru) Renato Tapia
CM	8	(Spain) Pol Llonch	(yellow card) 78'
LM	5	(Ecuador) Diego Palacios
CF	9	(Sweden) Alexander Isak
CF	10	(Greece) Vangelis Pavlidis
Substitutes:
GK	12	(New Zealand) Michael Woud
GK	28	(Netherlands) Luuk Brand
DF	24	(New Zealand) James McGarry
DF	27	(Netherlands) Victor van den Bogert
MF	14	(Republic of Ireland) Daniel Crowley		(substituted on) 62'
MF	16	(Greece) Marios Vrousai		(substituted on) 62'
MF	17	(Netherlands) Dries Saddiki
MF	20	(France) Karim Coulibaly
MF	22	(Germany) Atakan Akkaynak
MF	23	(Netherlands) Vurnon Anita
Manager:
(Netherlands) Adrie Koster

GK	24	(Cameroon) André Onana
RB	2	(Denmark) Rasmus Nissen Kristensen
CB	4	(Netherlands) Matthijs de Ligt (c)
CB	17	(Netherlands) Daley Blind
LB	31	(Argentina) Nicolás Tagliafico
CM	12	(Morocco) Noussair Mazraoui
CM	6	(Netherlands) Donny van de Beek
CM	21	(Netherlands) Frenkie de Jong	(substituted off) 79'
RW	22	(Morocco) Hakim Ziyech	(substituted off) 58'
CF	9	(Netherlands) Klaas-Jan Huntelaar
LW	10	(Serbia) Dušan Tadić	(substituted off) 73'
Substitutes:
GK	26	(Greece) Kostas Lamprou
GK	28	(Portugal) Bruno Varela
DF	3	(Netherlands) Joël Veltman
DF	8	(Netherlands) Daley Sinkgraven
DF	16	(Argentina) Lisandro Magallán
MF	19	(Morocco) Zakaria Labyad	(substituted on) 73'
MF	20	(Denmark) Lasse Schöne	(substituted on) 79'
MF	30	(Netherlands) Dani de Wit
MF	40	(Netherlands) Jurgen Ekkelenkamp
FW	7	(Brazil) David Neres	(substituted on) 58'
FW	23	(Burkina Faso) Lassina Traoré
FW	25	(Denmark) Kasper Dolberg
Manager:
(Netherlands) Erik ten Hag

Assistant referees:
Charles Schaap
Jan de Vries
Fourth official:
Allard Lindhout
Video assistant referee:
Pol van Boekel
Assistant video assistant referee:
Angelo Boonman

Match rules

- 90 minutes.
- 30 minutes of extra time if necessary.
- Penalty shoot-out (ABBA) if scores still level.
- Maximum of twelve named substitutes.
- Maximum of three substitutions, with a fourth allowed in extra time.
