= 2018–19 KNVB Cup =

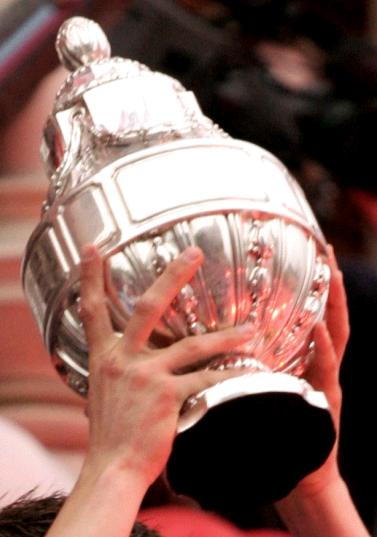
- KNVB trophy

Tournament details
- Country: Netherlands
- Venue(s): De Kuip, Rotterdam
- Dates: 18 August 2018 – 5 May 2019
- Teams: 64 (103 including preliminaries)

Final positions
- Champions: Ajax (19th title)
- Runners-up: Willem II

Tournament statistics
- Top goal scorer(s): Oussama Idrissi (6 goals)

The 2018–19 KNVB Cup, for sponsoring reasons officially called the TOTO KNVB Cup, was the 101st edition of the Dutch national football annual knockout tournament for the KNVB Cup. 64 teams contested, beginning on 18 August 2018 with the first of two preliminary rounds and ending on 5 May 2019 at the final played at De Kuip in Rotterdam.

Feyenoord from the Eredivisie beat AZ 3–0 in the final in the previous season on 30 April 2018. They were eliminated by Ajax in the semi-finals.

Ajax contested in the 2019 Johan Cruyff Shield against PSV Eindhoven.

== Schedule ==
Round	Match Dates
First preliminary round	18–19 August 2018
Second preliminary round	18, 21, 22, and 25 August 2018
First round	25–27 September 2018
Second round	30 October – 1 November 2018
Round of 16	18–20 December 2018
Quarter-finals	22–24 January 2019
Semi-finals	27–28 February 2019
Final	5 May 2019

== Matches ==
=== Preliminary rounds ===
The draw for the preliminary rounds were performed by Ridgeciano Haps on 7 July 2018 and was streamed live on the website of the KNVB.

==== First preliminary round ====
58 amateur teams qualified for this stage, although 26 received a bye to the next round, leaving 32 teams to compete for a spot in the second preliminary round. The participants are semi-finalists from the district cup tournaments, and teams from the Derde Divisie.

18 August 2018	ASWH (4)	5–0	MASV (8)	Hendrik-Ido-Ambacht
14:30 CEST	Verhoeve 39'; Dieterich 52', 78'; Yıldırım 58'; Pires 72'	Report		Stadium: Sportpark Schildman; Attendance: 450; Referee: Marcel Roeleveld

18 August 2018	FC 's-Gravenzande (5)	3–2	HV & CV Quick (4)	's-Gravenzande
14:30 CEST	Abbas 42'; Broch 61'; Broos 71'	Report	Lonzième 67'; Kouwenhoven 90'	Stadium: Juliana Sportpark; Attendance: 300; Referee: Martijn Vos

18 August 2018	VV Eemdijk (4)	3–0	VC Vlissingen (5)	Bunschoten-Spakenburg
15:00 CEST	Van den Dikkenberg 45'; Bouw 68', 73'	Report		Stadium: De Vinken; Attendance: 200; Referee: Frank de Winter

18 August 2018	VV Alverna (6)	0–2	ODIN '59 (4)	Alverna
17:00 CEST		Report	Klijbroek 35'; Bormann 90'	Stadium: Sportpark Het Bospad; Attendance: 300; Referee: Thom Winkel

18 August 2018	EVV (4)	7–0	VV Brielle (6)	Echt
17:00 CEST	Vankan 34' (pen.), 75'; Beelen 53', 56'; Rijkers 60'; Geenen 84'; Džurlić 85'	Report		Stadium: Sportpark In de Bandert; Attendance: 300; Referee: Thijs Voncken

18 August 2018	VV GOES (4)	0–4	VV Staphorst (5)	Goes
17:00 CEST		Report	Ter Avest 30', 59'; Luchtenberg 32'; De Jonge 90'	Stadium: Sportpark Het Schenge; Attendance: 300; Referee: Colin Prooi

18 August 2018	Harkemase Boys (4)	2–1	ASV De Dijk (4)	Harkema
17:00 CEST	Stelpstra 31'; Renken 81' (pen.)	Report	Köylü 60'	Stadium: De Bosk; Attendance: 400; Referee: Sam Dröge

18 August 2018	HSV Hoek (4)	3–0	ADO '20 (4)	Hoek
17:00 CEST	Impens 44', 77'; Constansia 50'	Report		Stadium: Sportpark Denoek; Attendance: 750; Referee: Roel de Cock

18 August 2018	SV OSS '20 (4)	2–4 (a.e.t.)	VV Noordwijk (4)	Oss
17:00 CEST	Van Sonsbeek 15', 27'	Report	James 24'; Westdijk 25'; Reynaars 94'; Van Staveren 108'	Stadium: Sportpark de Rusheuvel; Attendance: 250; Referee: Lorenzo Cairo

18 August 2018	Quick '20 (4)	2–6	DVS'33 Ermelo (4)	Oldenzaal
17:00 CEST	Kemna 48' (pen.); Van Breemen-Schneider 87'	Report	Pilon 11'; Roemeon 33', 56'; Powel 68'; Öztürk 76', 80'	Stadium: Sportpark Vondersweijde; Attendance: 200; Referee: Erik ter Brake

18 August 2018	Sportlust '46 (6)	1–4	HBS (4)	Woerden
17:00 CEST	Da Veiga 33'	Report	Six 45', 83', 89'; Van Pelt 78'	Stadium: Sportpark Cromwijck; Attendance: 300; Referee: Frank van den Elzen

18 August 2018	SteDoCo (4)	1–0	RKSV Cluzona (7)	Hoornaar
17:00 CEST	Schröder 61'	Report		Stadium: Sportpark SteDoCo; Attendance: 300; Referee: Luuk Timmer

18 August 2018	SV Urk (5)	2–2 (a.e.t.) (5–4 p)	SDO (5)	Urk
17:00 CEST	Kramer 13'; Brands 120' (pen.)	Report	Heerschop 52'; Van Huisstede 110' (pen.)	Stadium: Sportpark de Vormt; Attendance: 350; Referee: Daan Schaper
	Penalties
	Brands (penalty scored); M. Snoek (penalty scored); H. Snoek (penalty scored); Romkes (penalty scored); W. de Boer (penalty scored)		(penalty scored) Van Huisstede; (penalty scored) Hemmers; (penalty scored) Fokker; (penalty scored) Groenewegen; (penalty missed) Snijders

18 August 2018	ZVV Zaanlandia (6)	1–1 (a.e.t.) (4–5 p)	Achilles '29 (4)	Zaandam
17:00 CEST	Bulduk 90'	Report	Loning 45' (pen.)	Stadium: Sportpark Oostzijderveld; Attendance: 110; Referee: Bas Annegarn
	Penalties
	Bulduk (penalty scored); Rijser (penalty missed); De Graaf (penalty scored); Filippo (penalty scored); Bakr (penalty scored)		(penalty scored) Loning; (penalty scored) Van Dongen; (penalty scored) Izijk; (penalty scored) Parsisius; (penalty scored) Haggi Moni

19 August 2018	JOS Watergraafsmeer (6)	1–2 (a.e.t.)	RKVV Westlandia (4)	Amsterdam
14:00 CEST	Abbring 100'	Report	Vissers 93'; El Mhamdi 98'	Stadium: Sportpark Drieburg; Attendance: 200; Referee: Dave de Vries

19 August 2018	RKSV Bekkerveld (6)	2–4	USV Hercules (4)	Heerlen
14:30 CEST	Dowson 22', 33'	Report	Fonville 40', 61', 63'; Van Rooijen 64'	Stadium: Sportpark Aarveld; Attendance: 200; Referee: Jerôme Vries

==== Second preliminary round ====
In the second preliminary round, 54 amateur teams played. The participants were the 16 winners of the first preliminary round, 26 teams that were given a bye in the first preliminary round, and 12 teams from the Tweede Divisie. The matches were played on 18, 21, 22, and 25 August 2018.

18 August 2018	SV DFS (5)	2–1 (a.e.t.)	BVV Barendrecht (3)	Opheusden
14:30 CEST	Bokila 90'; Scheffer 105'	Report	Mourits 46'	Stadium: Sportpark 't Heerenland; Attendance: 315; Referee: Eric Thijs

18 August 2018	VV DOVO (4)	3–0	Quick Boys (4)	Veenendaal
14:30 CEST	Amerzgiou 43', 88'; Van Zeelst 55'	Report		Stadium: Sportpark Panhuis; Attendance: 400; Referee: Robin Hensgens

18 August 2018	DZC '68 (6)	0–2	SVV Scheveningen (3)	Doetinchem
14:30 CEST		Report	Peters 68'; Robinson 68'	Stadium: Sportpark Zuid; Attendance: 150; Referee: Jesse Rozendal

18 August 2018	Rijnsburgse Boys (3)	3–1	Ajax Amateurs (4)	Rijnsburg
14:30 CEST	Tillema 1', 85'; Hudepohl 56'	Report	Spruijt 29' (o.g.)	Stadium: Sportpark Middelmors; Attendance: 800; Referee: Robin Gansner

18 August 2018	SV Spakenburg (3)	4–1	RKSV Wittenhorst (6)	Spakenburg
16:00 CEST	Waalkens 33', 39', 55'; Oostinjen 60'	Report	Derks 84' (pen.)	Stadium: Sportpark De Westmaat; Attendance: 1,500; Referee: Nick Smit

18 August 2018	JVC Cuijk (4)	2–3	Koninklijke HFC (3)	Cuijk
18:00 CEST	Van Schoonhoven 27' (pen.), 90' (pen.)	Report	Tadmine 21', 90'; Mounji 74'	Stadium: Sportpark De Groenendijkse Kampen; Attendance: 500; Referee: Harold van de Ketterij

21 August 2018	MVV Alcides (5)	2–0	VVOG (4)	Meppel
20:00 CEST	F. Fokke 78', 87'	Report		Stadium: Sportpark Ezinge; Attendance: 300; Referee: Wouter Wiersma

21 August 2018	FC 's-Gravenzande (5)	1–2	Excelsior Maassluis (3)	's-Gravenzande
20:00 CEST	Westhoff 88'	Report	Van der Ende 14'; Sylla 33'	Stadium: Juliana Sportpark; Attendance: 400; Referee: Sander de Brito Roque

21 August 2018	GVVV (3)	0–3	SV TEC (4)	Veenendaal
20:00 CEST		Report	Koç 35', 76'; Mulder 39' (o.g.)	Stadium: Sportpark Panhuis; Attendance: 700; Referee: Jesse Rozendal

21 August 2018	IJsselmeervogels (3)	2–3	VV Noordwijk (4)	Spakenburg
20:00 CEST	Olijfveld 3'; Markiet 44'	Report	Wendt 68'; Van Staveren 88', 108'	Stadium: Sportpark De Westmaat; Attendance: 1,000; Referee: Robin Gansner

22 August 2018	USV Hercules (4)	0–4	ASWH (4)	Utrecht
18:00 CEST		Report	El Amrani 23'; Pires 49', 80' (pen.); Van den Bosch 56'	Stadium: Sportpark Voordorp; Attendance: 400; Referee: Eric Thijs

22 August 2018	Achilles '29 (4)	1–6	Harkemase Boys (4)	Groesbeek
20:00 CEST	Yaldız 83'	Report	Beimers 3'; Huizing 28'; Stelpstra 36'; Bouius 42'; Veldman 45', 53'	Stadium: Sportpark De Heikant; Attendance: 250; Referee: Luuk Timmer

22 August 2018	Blauw Geel '38 (4)	0–1	SV Urk (5)	Veghel
20:00 CEST		Report	Tol 74'	Stadium: Prins Willem Alexander Sportpark; Attendance: 300; Referee: Pedro Raven

22 August 2018	De Treffers (3)	1–2 (a.e.t.)	DVS'33 Ermelo (4)	Groesbeek
20:00 CEST	Ars 41'	Report	De Ruiter 90'; Powel 101'	Stadium: Sportpark Zuid; Attendance: 500; Referee: Thijs Voncken

22 August 2018	VV Gemert (5)	1–1 (a.e.t.) (3–2 p)	HSV Hoek (4)	Gemert
20:00 CEST	Van Brussel 89'	Report	Wilson 72'	Stadium: Sportpark Molenbroek; Attendance: 250; Referee: Lorenzo Cairo
	Penalties
	Den Dekker (penalty scored); Van den Broek (penalty scored); Fonken (penalty missed); Vereijken (penalty scored)		(penalty scored) Vandepitte; (penalty scored) Van Leiden; (penalty missed) Doesburg; (penalty missed) Klap; (penalty missed) Tiebosch

22 August 2018	HBS (4)	2–3	ONS Sneek (4)	The Hague
20:00 CEST	De Groot 26'; Six 90'	Report	Kuipers 40'; Koffema 50' (o.g.); Lanting 65' (pen.)	Stadium: Daal en Bergselaan; Attendance: 350; Referee: Jerôme Vries

22 August 2018	HHC Hardenberg (3)	0–3	OFC (4)	Hardenberg
20:00 CEST		Report	Brantjes 25'; Kharchouch 45'; Reclaoui 78'	Stadium: De Boshoek; Attendance: 500; Referee: Daan Schaper

22 August 2018	ODIN '59 (4)	1–0	VV Dongen (4)	Heemskerk
20:00 CEST	De Vries 14' (pen.)	Report		Stadium: Sportpark Assumburg; Attendance: 250; Referee: Robin Hensgens

22 August 2018	OJC Rosmalen (4)	4–1 (a.e.t.)	Flevo Boys (5)	Rosmalen
20:00 CEST	Wijkmans 11'; Meeuwsen 102'; Dibets 115'; Van Kempen 120'	Report	Post 60'	Stadium: Sportpark De Groote Wielen; Attendance: 300; Referee: Wim Bronsvoort

22 August 2018	RKAV Volendam (5)	1–0 (a.e.t.)	EVV (4)	Volendam
20:00 CEST	Zwarthoed 120' (pen.)	Report		Stadium: Julianaweg; Attendance: 300; Referee: Roel de Cock

22 August 2018	RKSV Groene Ster (5)	2–1	FC Lienden (3)	Heerlerheide
20:00 CEST	Hellemons 53'; Eind 64'	Report	Hak 43'	Stadium: Sportpark Pronsebroek; Attendance: 300; Referee: Nick Tunnissen

22 August 2018	VV SJC (4)	0–2	FC Lisse (4)	Noordwijk
20:00 CEST		Report	Oehlers 33'; Adouch 89'	Stadium: Sportpark Duinwetering; Attendance: 400; Referee: Martijn Vos

22 August 2018	VV Staphorst (5)	2–1 (a.e.t.)	HSC '21 (4)	Staphorst
20:00 CEST	Veldmate 78' (pen.); Kin 112'	Report	T. ter Hogt 60'	Stadium: Het Noorderslag; Attendance: 500; Referee: Thom Winkel

22 August 2018	VV UNA (4)	2–4	VV Eemdijk (4)	Zeelst
20:00 CEST	Boogers 5'; Sebregts 65'	Report	Morrison 35'; De Graaf 86'; Bouw 89', 90'	Stadium: Sportpark Zeelst; Attendance: 300; Referee: Jaafar Aafouallah

22 August 2018	VV Uno Animo (7)	1–6	VVSB (3)	Loon op Zand
20:00 CEST	Van der Loo 25'	Report	De Rijk 8'; Batist 20'; Van Son 44' (o.g.); Bekooij 71'; Dijkstra 85'; Felicia 89'	Stadium: Sportpark De Klokkenberg; Attendance: 250; Referee: Victor Ris

22 August 2018	RKVV Westlandia (4)	2–1	SteDoCo (4)	Naaldwijk
20:00 CEST	Serbony 13', 32'	Report	Dos Santos 90' (pen.)	Stadium: Sportpark De Hoge Bomen; Attendance: 400; Referee: Bilal Şahiner

25 August 2018	HVV Te Werve (7)	3–1 (a.e.t.)	SV Marvilde (7)	Rijswijk
14:30 CEST	Reijntjes 46'; Vogel 114'; Overman 120'	Report	Van den Akker 68'	Stadium: Sportpark Vredenburch; Attendance: 175; Referee: Pim Weghorst

=== Main tournament ===
There are 64 teams going into the main tournament: 27 winners from the preliminary rounds, 34 professional teams, and three (replacement) period champions from the Tweede Divisie.

==== First round ====
25 September 2018	Amsterdamsche FC (3)	5–0	Telstar (2)	Amsterdam
17:00 CEST	Belarbi 14'; Teijsse 62'; Kulhan 71'; Hoek 84'; Lindhorst 86'	Report		Stadium: Sportpark Goed Genoeg; Attendance: 500; Referee: Jannick van der Laan

25 September 2018	RKC Waalwijk (2)	2–0	NAC Breda (1)	Waalwijk
18:30 CEST	Baggerman 42'; Seys 47'	Report		Stadium: Mandemakers Stadion; Attendance: 2,713; Referee: Kevin Blom

25 September 2018	SV Spakenburg (3)	3–0	SV DFS (5)	Bunschoten-Spakenburg
19:45 CEST	Van der Neut 13'; Sterling 67'; Van der Sande 90+3' (pen.)	Report		Stadium: Sportpark De Westmaat; Attendance: 800; Referee: Marc Nagtegaal

25 September 2018	DVS'33 Ermelo (4)	0–6	Roda JC (2)	Ermelo
19:45 CEST		Report	Engels 11' (pen.); Simamala 44', 45+2'; Väyrynen 53'; Van Velzen 68'; Milts 77'	Stadium: Sportpark DVS 33; Attendance: 1,500; Referee: Sander van der Eijk

25 September 2018	Koninklijke HFC (3)	4–0	Harkemase Boys (4)	Haarlem
19:45 CEST	Tadmine 10' (pen.); Van der Linden 65', 86'; Lewis 90+2'	Report		Stadium: Sportpark Spanjaardslaan; Attendance: 400; Referee: Stan Teuben

25 September 2018	ODIN '59 (4)	1–0	FC Lisse (4)	Heemskerk
19:45 CEST	Dikker 9'	Report		Stadium: Sportpark ODIN '59; Attendance: 400; Referee: Robin Gansner

25 September 2018	VV Noordwijk (4)	3–2	Sparta Rotterdam (2)	Noordwijk
19:45 CEST	James 8'; Roshanali 52'; Akachau-Achefay 80'	Report	Harroui 17', 26'	Stadium: Sportpark Duinwetering; Attendance: 5,900; Referee: Alex Bos

25 September 2018	SVV Scheveningen (3)	2–3 (a.e.t.)	SC Cambuur (2)	Scheveningen
19:45 CEST	Donald 35', 45+4'	Report	Cigaņiks 31'; Robertha 89'; Van Wermeskerken 105'	Stadium: Sportpark Houtrust; Attendance: 450; Referee: Rob Dieperink

25 September 2018	FC Volendam (2)	1–2	Willem II (1)	Volendam
19:45 CEST	Kaars 42'	Report	Avdijaj 4'; Fran Sol 48'	Stadium: Kras Stadion; Attendance: 1,607; Referee: Siemen Mulder

25 September 2018	Rijnsburgse Boys (3)	1–1 (4–5 p)	TOP Oss (2)	Rijnsburg
19:45 CEST	Jongeneelen 74'	Report	Rommens 26'	Stadium: Middelmors; Attendance: 1,200; Referee: Christian Mulder
	Penalties
	Goeman (penalty scored); Jongeneelen (penalty scored); Knol (penalty scored); Tillema (penalty scored); Tervoert (penalty missed); Artien (penalty missed)		Smeets (penalty scored); Rommens (penalty scored); Stuij van den Herik (penalty missed); Kaak (penalty scored); Van der Biezen (penalty scored); Nieveld (penalty scored)

25 September 2018	Go Ahead Eagles (2)	2–0	FC Eindhoven (2)	Deventer
19:45 CEST	Navrátil 67'; Langedijk 89'	Report		Stadium: De Adelaarshorst; Attendance: 3,168; Referee: Laurens Gerrets

25 September 2018	FC Den Bosch (2)	1–2	Heracles Almelo (1)	's-Hertogenbosch
19:45 CEST	Velkov 11'	Report	Vermeij 12', 55'	Stadium: De Vliert; Attendance: 2,176; Referee: Serdar Gözübüyük

25 September 2018	Almere City (2)	1–0	FC Dordrecht (2)	Almere
19:45 CEST	Luckassen 5'	Report		Stadium: Yanmar Stadion; Attendance: 1,734; Referee: Edwin van de Graaf

25 September 2018	Helmond Sport (2)	0–5	Fortuna Sittard (1)	Helmond
19:45 CEST		Report	Hutten 10', 58'; Vidigal 50', 66', 84'	Stadium: SolarUnie Stadion; Attendance: 1,681; Referee: Martin van den Kerkhof

25 September 2018	RKVV Westlandia (4)	0–3	VVV-Venlo (1)	Naaldwijk
19:45 CEST		Report	Samuelsen 27', 57'; Kum 65'	Stadium: Sportpark De Hoge Bomen; Attendance: 2,250; Referee: Ingmar Oostrom

26 September 2018	VVSB (3)	3–3 (a.e.t.) (3–5 p)	De Graafschap (1)	Noordwijkerhout
19:45 CEST	Bekooij 22', 73'; Martins 94'	Report	Abena 32'; Owusu 71'; Olijve 102'	Stadium: Sportpark de Boekhorst; Attendance: 1,500; Referee: Martin Perez
	Penalties
	Bekooij (penalty missed); Zwart (penalty scored); Dijkstra (penalty scored); De Rijk (penalty scored)		(penalty scored) Olijve; (penalty scored) Owusu; (penalty scored) El Jebli; (penalty scored) Van Mieghem; (penalty scored) Bakker

25 September 2018	Kozakken Boys (3)	3–1	ONS Sneek (4)	Werkendam
20:00 CEST	Vicento 3'; Stout 20'; El Azzouti 28'	Report	De Boer 11'	Stadium: Sportpark De Zwaaier; Attendance: 375; Referee: Jannick van der Laan

25 September 2018	Excelsior (1)	2–3 (a.e.t.)	N.E.C. (2)	Rotterdam
19:45 CEST	Bruins 20' (pen.); Buwalda 24' (o.g.)	Report	Achabar 34' (pen.); Braken 80' (pen.); Guus Joppen 107'	Stadium: Van Donge & De Roo Stadion; Attendance: 1,902; Referee: Jochem Kamphuis

26 September 2018	VV Staphorst (5)	0–1	PEC Zwolle (1)	Staphorst
17:00 CEST		Report	Van Crooij 8'	Stadium: Het Noorderslag; Attendance: 3,500; Referee: Bas Nijhuis

26 September 2018	Excelsior Maassluis (3)	0–4	PSV Eindhoven (1)	Maassluis
18:30 CEST		Report	Gakpo 15'; Sainsbury 44'; Lundqvist 69'; Isimat-Mirin 73'	Stadium: Sportpark Dijkpolder; Attendance: 3,200; Referee: Jeroen Manschot

26 September 2018	DOVO (4)	2–2 (a.e.t.) (4–5 p)	SV Urk (5)	Veenendaal
19:45 CEST	Patrick 83', 108'	Report	R. Brands 51'; Nentjes 114'	Stadium: Sportpark Panhuis; Attendance: 950; Referee: Richard Martens
	Penalties
	Patrick (penalty scored); Toonen (penalty scored); Wormgoor (penalty scored); Bakkenes (penalty scored); Berkvens (penalty missed)		Brands (penalty scored); H. Snoek (penalty scored); Van Slooten (penalty scored); P. Brands (penalty scored); Nentjes (penalty scored)

26 September 2018	VV Eemdijk (4)	1–4	ASWH (4)	Bunschoten-Spakenburg
19:45 CEST	Van den Dikkenberg 73'	Report	Yildirim 5', 37', 86'; Verhoeven 82'	Stadium: Sportpark de Vinken; Attendance: 350; Referee: Sam Dröge

26 September 2018	RKAV Volendam (5)	1–2	Vitesse (1)	Volendam
19:45 CEST	Tol 84'	Report	Van der Werff 15'; Darfalou 43'	Stadium: Sportpark Volendam; Attendance: 2,500; Referee: Freek van Herk

26 September 2018	VV Katwijk (3)	0–1 (a.e.t.)	SC Heerenveen (1)	Katwijk
19:45 CEST		Report	Lammers 117'	Stadium: Sportpark de Krom; Attendance: 1,750; Referee: Clay Ruperti

26 September 2018	OJC Rosmalen (4)	0–6	ADO Den Haag (1)	Rosmalen
17:00 CEST		Report	Necid 24', 87'; El Khayati 24', 59'; Beugelsdijk 39'; Becker 85'	Stadium: Voetbalcomplex De Grote Wielen; Attendance: 1,500; Referee: Dennis Higler

26 September 2018	Groene Ster (5)	2–1	TEC (4)	Heerlerheide
19:45 CEST	Hellemons 45+3'; Unal 65'	Report	Van Westerlaken 79'	Stadium: Sportpark Pronsebroek; Attendance: 650; Referee: Jerome Vries

26 September 2018	HVV Te Werve (7)	0–7	Ajax (1)	Noordwijk
20:45 CEST		Report	Schuurs 10'; Dolberg 17'; Van de Beek 30'; Labyad 38', 59'; Ekkelenkamp 66'; Gravenberg 82'	Stadium: Sportpark Duinwetering; Attendance: 3,500; Referee: Christiaan Bax

27 September 2018	MVV Alcides (5)	0–6	AZ (1)	Meppel
17:00 CEST		Report	Johnsen 16'; Idrissi 24', 72', 76' (pen.); Maher 33'; Rotariu 42'	Stadium: Sportpark Ezinge; Attendance: 1,750; Referee: Joey Kooij

27 September 2018	OFC (4)	1–3	FC Emmen (1)	Oostzaan
17:00 CEST	el Yaghmouri 86'	Report	Niemeijer 10'; Bijl 55' (pen.), 80' (pen.)	Stadium: Sportpark Twiskepolder; Attendance: 800; Referee: Luca Evian Cantineau

27 September 2018	FC Groningen (1)	0–2	FC Twente (2)	Groningen
18:30 CEST		Report	Espinosa 45'; Bijen 68'	Stadium: Euroborg; Attendance: 18,192; Referee: Danny Makkelie

27 September 2018	FC Utrecht (1)	2–0	MVV (2)	Utrecht
19:45 CEST	Dessers 61' (pen.); Venema 90+5'	Report		Stadium: Stadion Galgenwaard; Attendance: 16,206; Referee: Martin van den Kerkhof

27 September 2018	VV Gemert (5)	0–4	Feyenoord (1)	Helmond
20:45 CEST		Report	Vente 11', 65', 71'; Kökçü 45'	Stadium: SolarUnie Stadion; Attendance: 4,200; Referee: Pol van Boekel

==== Second round ====
The draw for the second round was performed on 29 September 2018 at 23:00 CEST. The matches of the second round took place between 30 October and 1 November 2018.

30 October 2018	PSV Eindhoven (1)	2–3 (a.e.t.)	RKC Waalwijk (2)	Eindhoven
18:30 CET	Gutiérrez 1'; Mauro Júnior 76'	Report	Van Weert 29'; Maatsen 90', 109'	Stadium: Philips Stadion; Attendance: 24,500; Referee: Martin van den Kerkhof

30 October 2018	Amsterdamsche FC (3)	1–0	TOP Oss (2)	Amsterdam
19:45 CET	Teijsse 63'	Report		Stadium: Goed Genoeg; Attendance: 650; Referee: Jannick van der Laan

30 October 2018	SC Cambuur (2)	2–1	Koninklijke HFC (3)	Leeuwarden
19:45 CET	Mathieu 19'; Conraad 55'	Report	Noordmans 72'	Stadium: Cambuur Stadion; Attendance: 3,298; Referee: Rob Dieperink

30 October 2018	Kozakken Boys (3)	2–1	Almere City (2)	Werkendam
19:45 CET	El Azzouti 11', 90+3'	Report	Meijer 80'	Stadium: Sportpark De Zwaaier; Attendance: 800; Referee: Alex Bos

30 October 2018	FC Twente (2)	4–2	VV Noordwijk (4)	Enschede
19:45 CET	Espinosa 28', 38'; Cantalapiedra 29'; Zekhnini 90+3'	Report	Wendt 31', 86'	Stadium: De Grolsch Veste; Attendance: 14,800; Referee: Christiaan Bax

30 October 2018	SV Urk (5)	0–1	Roda JC (2)	Urk
19:45 CET		Report	El Makrini 53'	Stadium: De Vormt; Attendance: 2,200; Referee: Sander van der Eijk

30 October 2018	De Graafschap (1)	2–5	PEC Zwolle (1)	Doetinchem
20:45 CET	Vet 53'; Bakker 64'	Report	Flemming 13', 23', 44', 71'; Van Duinen 56'	Stadium: De Vijverberg; Attendance: 4,325; Referee: Bas Nijhuis

31 October 2018	Heracles Almelo (1)	0–2	Vitesse (1)	Almelo
18:30 CET		Report	Ødegaard 40'; Buitink 89'	Stadium: Polman Stadion; Attendance: 10,037; Referee: Siemen Mulder

31 October 2018	AZ (1)	2–0	VVV-Venlo (1)	Alkmaar
19:45 CET	Seuntjens 46'; Idrissi 87'	Report		Stadium: AFAS Stadion; Attendance: 6,026; Referee: Allard Lindhout

31 October 2018	Groene Ster (5)	1–3	SC Heerenveen (1)	Heerlerheide
19:45 CET	Eind 40'	Report	Rienstra 46'; Zeneli 49'; Lammers 70'	Stadium: Sportpark Pronsebroek; Attendance: 2,500; Referee: Martin Perez

31 October 2018	FC Emmen (1)	1–3	ODIN '59 (4)	Emmen
19:45 CET	Bijl 18'	Report	Al Mahdi 34'; Hardenberg 75' (pen.), 82'	Stadium: De Oude Meerdijk; Attendance: 3,578; Referee: Ingmar Oostrom

31 October 2018	FC Utrecht (1)	5–1	ASWH (4)	Utrecht
19:45 CET	Kerk 5'; Overeem 28'; Dessers 74'; Van de Streek 77', 83'	Report	Van den Bosch 22'	Stadium: Stadion Galgenwaard; Attendance: 8,398; Referee: Joey Kooij

31 October 2018	Willem II (1)	5–0	SV Spakenburg (3)	Tilburg
19:45 CET	Sol 9', 81'; Crowley 24'; Avdijaj 53', 59'	Report		Stadium: Koning Willem II Stadion; Attendance: 8,931; Referee: Edwin van de Graaf

31 October 2018	Ajax (1)	3–0	Go Ahead Eagles (2)	Amsterdam
20:45 CET	Neres 35'; Labyad 38'; Huntelaar 63'	Report		Stadium: Johan Cruyff Arena; Attendance: 43,884; Referee: Kevin Blom

1 November 2018	N.E.C. (2)	2–3	Fortuna Sittard (1)	Nijmegen
18:30 CET	Sanniez 20'; Braken 28'	Report	Diemers 22' (pen.); Stokkers 66'; Hutten 85'	Stadium: Stadion de Goffert; Attendance: 4,103; Referee: Pol van Boekel

1 November 2018	Feyenoord (1)	5–1	ADO Den Haag (1)	Rotterdam
20:45 CET	Jørgensen 18', 56', 81'; Botteghin 44'; Sam Larsson 89'	Report	El Khayati 7'	Stadium: De Kuip; Attendance: 35,000; Referee: Jochem Kamphuis

==== Round of 16 ====
The draw for the round of 16 took place on 3 November 2018 at 23:00 CET. The matches of the round of 16 took place between 18 and 20 December 2018.

18 December 2018	Willem II (1)	3–0	Amsterdamsche FC (3)	Tilburg
18:30 CET	Avdijaj 18'; Sol 37' (pen.); Özbiliz 39'	Report		Stadium: Koning Willem II Stadion; Attendance: 8,506; Referee: Stan Teuben

18 December 2018	FC Twente (2)	2–0	RKC Waalwijk (2)	Enschede
19:45 CET	Schenk 26'; Oosterwijk 90+1'	Report		Stadium: De Grolsch Veste; Attendance: 14,969; Referee: Richard Martens

18 December 2018	AZ (1)	5–0	PEC Zwolle (1)	Alkmaar
20:45 CET	Idrissi 10', 18'; Til 26'; Seuntjens 48'; Midtsjø 50'	Report		Stadium: AFAS Stadion; Attendance: 6,068; Referee: Dennis Higler

19 December 2018	ODIN '59 (4)	1–3	SC Heerenveen (1)	Velsen
18:30 CET	Bormann 2'	Report	Vlap 9'; Lammers 54'; Van Amersfoort 86'	Stadium: Rabobank IJmond Stadion; Attendance: 3,243; Referee: Luca Evian Cantineau

19 December 2018	Fortuna Sittard (1)	2–1	SC Cambuur (2)	Sittard
19:45 CET	Semedo 19'; Lamprou 80'	Report	Rossi 90'	Stadium: Fortuna Sittard Stadion; Attendance: 3,522; Referee: Rob Dieperink

19 December 2018	Roda JC (2)	1–1 (a.e.t.) (2–4 p)	Ajax (1)	Kerkrade
20:45 CET	Paulissen 36' (pen.)	Report	Tadić 13' (pen.)	Stadium: Parkstad Limburg Stadion; Attendance: 14,296; Referee: Serdar Gözübüyük
	Penalties
	Engels (penalty missed); Paulissen (penalty missed); Gnjatić (penalty scored); Verburgh (penalty scored)		(penalty scored) Tadić; (penalty scored) Huntelaar; (penalty missed) De Ligt; (penalty scored) Dolberg; (penalty scored) Blind

20 December 2018	Kozakken Boys (3)	1–2	Vitesse (1)	Werkendam
18:30 CET	Jakoba 59'	Report	Bero 12'; Ødegaard 90+2'	Stadium: Sportpark De Zwaaier; Attendance: 2,200; Referee: Erik Blank

20 December 2018	Feyenoord (1)	1–0	FC Utrecht (1)	Rotterdam
20:45 CET	Vilhena 27'	Report		Stadium: De Kuip; Attendance: 35,000; Referee: Björn Kuipers

==== Quarter-finals ====
The draw for the quarter-finals took place on 22 December 2018 at 23:00 CET. The matches of the quarter-finals took place between 22 and 24 January 2019. From this round on the referees are assisted by video assistant referee.

22 January 2019	AZ (1)	2–0	Vitesse (1)	Alkmaar
20:45 CET	Stengs 40'; Till 54'	Report		Stadium: AFAS Stadion; Attendance: 8,165; Referee: Dennis Higler

23 January 2019	FC Twente (2)	2–3	Willem II (1)	Enschede
18:30 CET	Aitor 54', 64'	Report	González 62' (o.g.); Pavlidis 76'; Kristinsson 87'	Stadium: De Grolsch Veste; Attendance: 19,560; Referee: Jocehm Kamphuis

23 January 2019	Feyenoord (1)	4–1	Fortuna Sittard (1)	Rotterdam
20:45 CET	Van Persie 34', 68' (pen.); Van Beek 82'; Berghuis 90+4' (pen.)	Report	Novakovich 54'	Stadium: De Kuip; Attendance: 25,000; Referee: Serdar Gözübüyük

24 January 2019	Ajax (1)	3–1	SC Heerenveen (1)	Amsterdam
20:45 CET	Mazraoui 3'; Van de Beek 16', 38'	Report	Van Amersfoort 84'	Stadium: Johan Cruyff Arena; Attendance: 43,819; Referee: Kevin Blom

==== Semi-finals ====
The semi-finals took place on 27 and 28 February 2019.

27 February 2019	Feyenoord (1)	0–3	Ajax (1)	Rotterdam
20:45		Report	De Ligt 45'; Tagliafico 49'; Van de Beek 65'	Stadium: De Kuip; Attendance: 47,500; Referee: Kevin Blom

28 February 2019	Willem II (1)	1–1 (a.e.t.) (2–1 p)	AZ (1)	Tilburg
20:45 CET	Isak 64'	Report	Stengs 23'	Stadium: Koning Willem II Stadion; Attendance: 13,317; Referee: Jochem Kamphuis
	Penalties
	Heerkens (penalty scored); Crowley (penalty missed); Meißner (penalty missed); Isak (penalty scored)		(penalty missed) Koopmeiners; (penalty missed) Til; (penalty missed) Van Rhijn; (penalty scored) Idrissi; (penalty missed) Johnsen

==== Final ====
5 May 2019
18:00 CEST

Willem II	0–4	Ajax
	Report	Blind 38'; Huntelaar 39', 67'; Kristensen 76'

De Kuip, Rotterdam
Attendance: 45,709
Referee: Serdar Gözübüyük
