= 2022 KNVB Cup final =

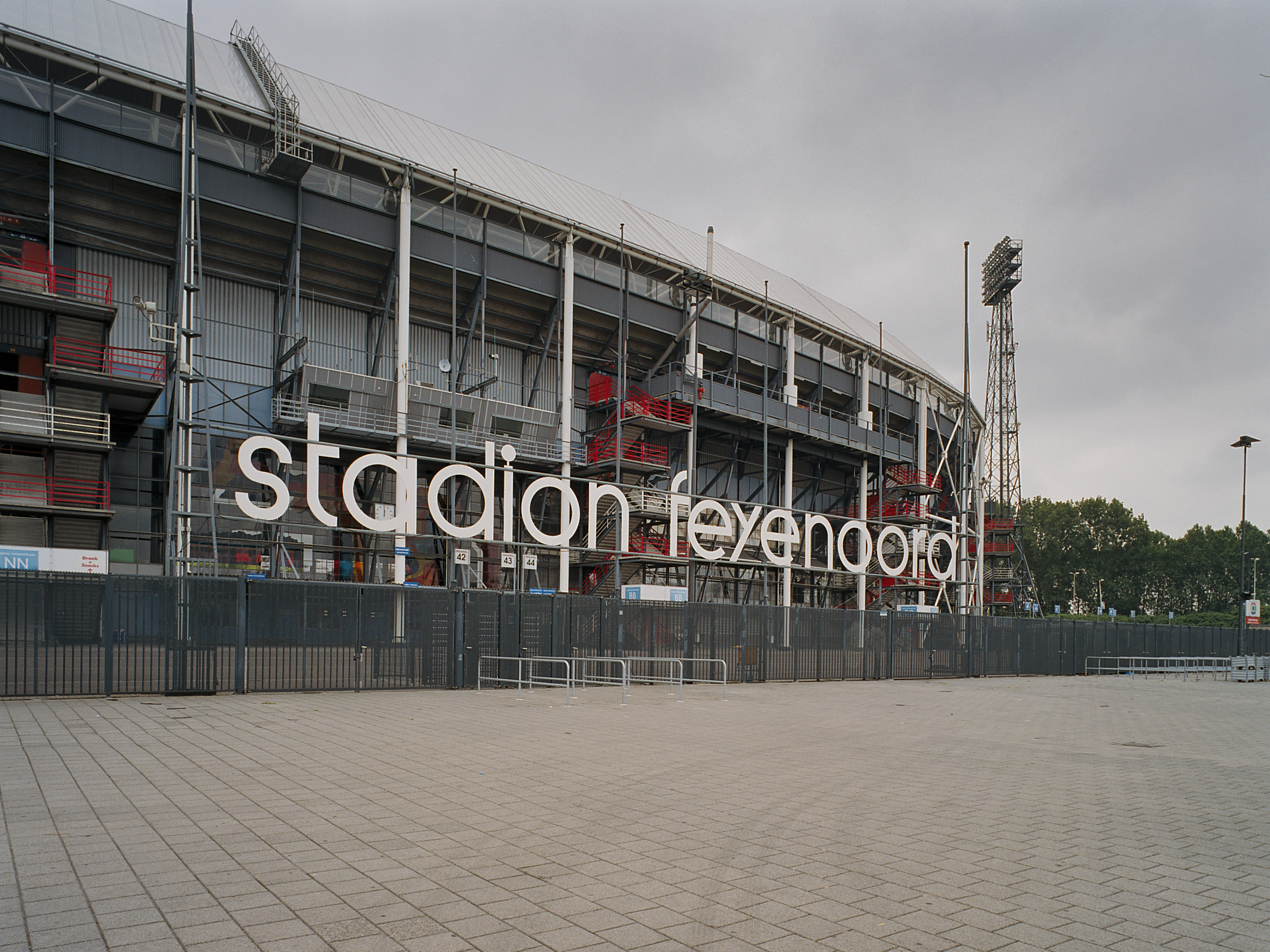
- De Kuip in Rotterdam hosted the final.
- Event: 2021–22 KNVB Cup
PSV	Ajax
2	1
- Date: 17 April 2022
- Venue: De Kuip, Rotterdam
- Referee: Danny Makkelie
- Attendance: 42,824

The 2022 KNVB Cup final was a football match between Eredivisie clubs PSV and Ajax, that took place on 17 April 2022 at De Kuip, Rotterdam. It was the final match of the 2021–22 KNVB Cup, the 104th season of the annual Dutch national football cup competition.

PSV won the match 2–1 for their tenth title. As winners, they competed in the 2022 Johan Cruyff Shield and earned a spot in the 2022–23 UEFA Europa League play-off round if they had not qualified for the 2022–23 UEFA Champions League. With PSV finishing second in 2021–22 Eredivisie, the Europa League play-off round spot was instead given to the third placed team in the Eredivisie.

== Route to the final ==
PSV		Round	Ajax	
Opponent	Result		Opponent	Result
Bye		First round	Bye	
Fortuna Sittard	2–0 (H)	Second round	Barendrecht	4–0 (H)
Telstar	2–1 (H)	Round of 16	Excelsior Maassluis	9–0 (H)
NAC Breda	4–0 (H)	Quarter-finals	Vitesse	5–0 (H)
Go Ahead Eagles	2–1 (A)	Semi-finals	AZ	2–0 (A)

== Match ==
17 April 2022
18:00 UTC+02:00

PSV	2–1	Ajax
Gutiérrez 48'; Gakpo 50'	Report	Gravenberch 23'

De Kuip, Rotterdam
Attendance: 42,824
Referee: Danny Makkelie

PSV	Ajax

GK	38	(Switzerland) Yvon Mvogo
RB	17	(Brazil) Mauro Júnior
CB	3	(Netherlands) Jordan Teze	(yellow card) 88'
CB	5	(Brazil) André Ramalho
LB	31	(Germany) Philipp Max	(yellow card) 63'
DM	6	(Ivory Coast) Ibrahim Sangaré
CM	15	(Mexico) Érick Gutiérrez
CM	23	(Netherlands) Joey Veerman		(substituted off) 69'
RF	27	(Germany) Mario Götze	(yellow card) 90+3'
CF	7	(Israel) Eran Zahavi		(substituted off) 81'
LF	11	(Netherlands) Cody Gakpo (c)		(substituted off) 69'
Substitutes:
GK	16	(Netherlands) Joël Drommel
GK	21	(Belgium) Maxime Delanghe
DF	35	(Norway) Fredrik Oppegård
MF	8	(Netherlands) Marco van Ginkel		(substituted on) 90+2'
MF	25	(Japan) Ritsu Dōan		(substituted on) 69'
MF	37	(United States) Richard Ledezma
FW	9	(Brazil) Carlos Vinícius
FW	19	(Portugal) Bruma		(substituted on) 69'
FW	20	(Argentina) Maximiliano Romero
FW	32	(Belgium) Yorbe Vertessen		(substituted on) 81'	(substituted off) 90+2'
Manager:
(Germany) Roger Schmidt

GK	1	(Netherlands) Maarten Stekelenburg
RB	12	(Morocco) Noussair Mazraoui		(substituted off) 72'
CB	2	(Netherlands) Jurriën Timber
CB	21	(Argentina) Lisandro Martínez	(yellow card) 18'
LB	17	(Netherlands) Daley Blind
CM	6	(Netherlands) Davy Klaassen		(substituted off) 86'
CM	4	(Mexico) Edson Álvarez		(substituted off) 72'
CM	8	(Netherlands) Ryan Gravenberch	(yellow card) 81'
RF	23	(Netherlands) Steven Berghuis		(substituted off) 86'
CF	18	(Netherlands) Brian Brobbey
LF	10	(Serbia) Dušan Tadić (c)
Substitutes:
GK	16	(Netherlands) Jay Gorter
GK	33	(Poland) Przemysław Tytoń
DF	3	(Netherlands) Perr Schuurs		(substituted on) 72'
DF	46	(Netherlands) Anass Salah-Eddine
MF	20	(Ghana) Mohammed Kudus		(substituted on) 86'
MF	25	(Netherlands) Kenneth Taylor
MF	27	(Netherlands) Mohamed Ihattaren		(substituted on) 86'
MF	44	(Netherlands) Youri Regeer
FW	9	(Brazil) Danilo
FW	22	(Ivory Coast) Sébastien Haller		(substituted on) 72'
FW	30	(Denmark) Mohamed Daramy
Manager:
(Netherlands) Erik ten Hag

Assistant referees:
Hessel Steegstra
Jan de Vries
Fourth official:
Joey Kooij
Video assistant referee:
Dennis Higler
Assistant video assistant referee:
Erwin Zeinstra

Match rules

- 90 minutes.
- 30 minutes of extra time if necessary.
- Penalty shoot-out if scores still level.
- Maximum of twelve named substitutes.
- Maximum of five substitutions, with a sixth allowed in extra time. (Note: Each team was only given three opportunities to make substitutions, with a fourth opportunity in extra time, excluding substitutions made at half-time, before the start of extra time and at half-time in extra time.)
