= Ryan Gravenberch =

Dutch footballer (born 2002)

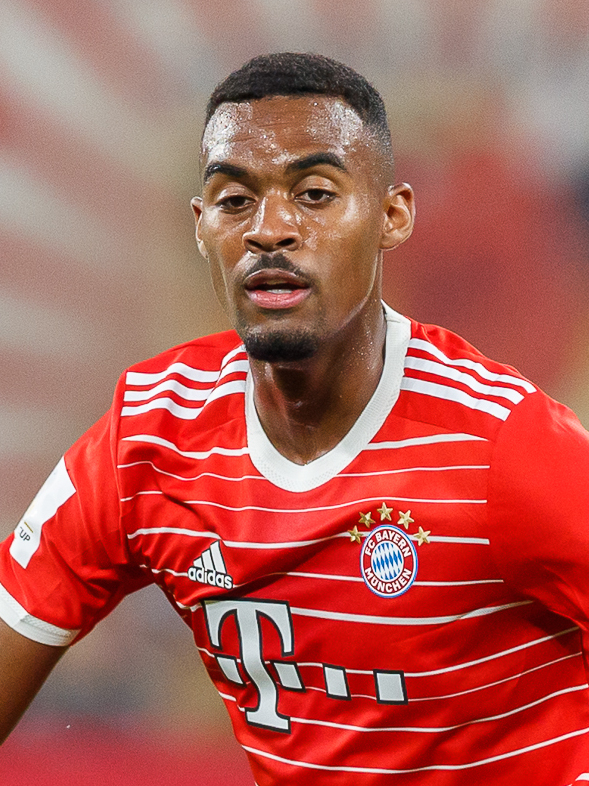
- Gravenberch playing for Bayern Munich in 2022

Personal information
- Full name: Ryan Jiro Gravenberch
- Date of birth: 16 May 2002 (age 24)
- Place of birth: Amsterdam, Netherlands
- Height: 1.90 m (6 ft 3 in)
- Position: Defensive midfielder

Team information
- Current team: Liverpool
- Number: 38

Youth career
- 2010–2018: Ajax

Senior career*
Years	Team	Apps	(Gls)
2018–2020	Jong Ajax	44	(8)
2018–2022	Ajax	72	(7)
2022–2023	Bayern Munich	25	(0)
2023–	Liverpool	104	(6)

International career^{‡}
2017–2018	Netherlands U16	6	(1)
2018	Netherlands U17	4	(0)
2018–2020	Netherlands U19	8	(0)
2020–2023	Netherlands U21	11	(1)
2021–	Netherlands	35	(1)
Medal record
Men's football
Representing Netherlands
UEFA European Championship
Bronze medal – third place	2024 Germany	Team
UEFA European Under-17 Championship
Winner	2018 England	Team
- * Club domestic league appearances and goals as of 20 September 2026 (UTC) ‡ National team caps and goals as of 4 October 2026 (UTC)

Ryan Jiro Gravenberch (born 16 May 2002) is a Dutch professional footballer who plays as a defensive midfielder for Premier League club Liverpool and the Netherlands national team.

Gravenberch began his career with Ajax, where he won three Eredivisie titles. In 2022, he signed for Bayern Munich, helping them win the Bundesliga. He transferred to Liverpool in 2023, where he emerged as a focal player in the club's 2024–25 Premier League win.

Gravenberch played for the Netherlands at various youth levels, and was part of the under-17 squad that won the 2018 UEFA European Under-17 Championship. He made his senior debut in 2021, and represented the nation at UEFA Euro 2024 and the 2026 FIFA World Cup.

== Club career ==
=== Ajax ===
Gravenberch joined the Ajax Youth Academy in 2010, and worked his way up through the junior levels. On 7 June 2018, he received the first ever "Abdelhak Nouri Trofee", which recognises the best talent in the Ajax academy. He signed his first professional contract with Ajax that same day, keeping him at the club until 2023. Gravenberch made his professional debut with Jong Ajax in a 5–2 Eerste Divisie win over Dordrecht on 24 August 2018.

Gravenberch made his senior debut with Ajax on 23 September 2018, in a 3–0 Eredivisie loss to PSV. He became the youngest ever Ajax player to play in the Eredivisie at 16 years and 130 days, surpassing the record of 16 years and 242 days set by Clarence Seedorf. Three days later, Gravenberch made his first start for Ajax, scoring in a 7–0 KNVB Cup win against Te Werve, becoming the youngest goalscorer for the club in the process.

On 25 November 2020, Gravenberch scored his first Champions League goal in a 3–1 win over Midtjylland in the 2020–21 season.

On 18 April 2021, Gravenberch scored the first goal in a 2–1 win over Vitesse in the 2021 KNVB Cup final.

=== Bayern Munich ===
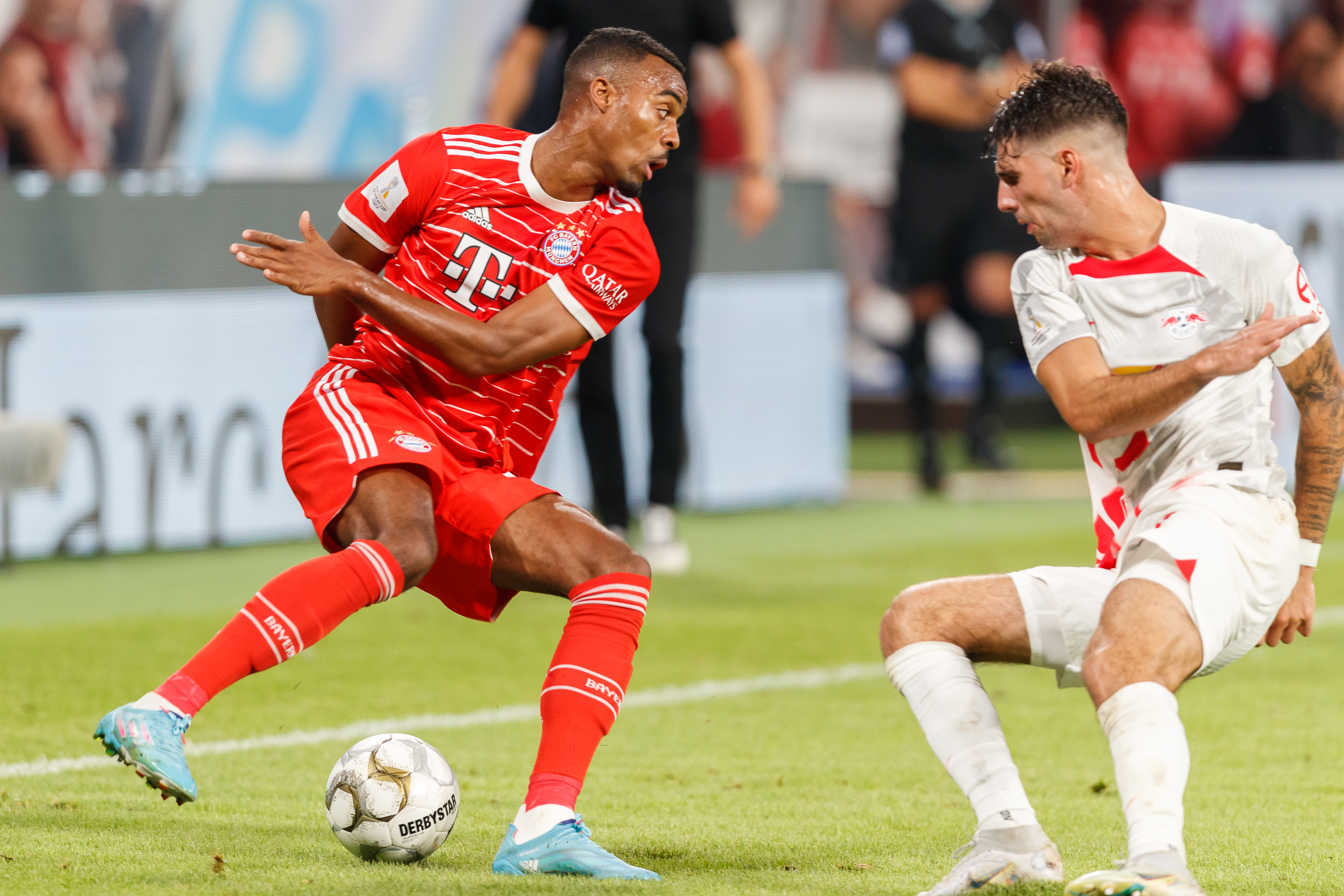
Gravenberch (left) playing for Bayern Munich in 2022 against future Liverpool teammate Dominik Szoboszlai.

On 13 June 2022, Gravenberch signed for Bundesliga club Bayern Munich on a five-year contract. The transfer fee paid to Ajax was a reported €18 million, with an additional €5 million in variables. On 31 August, he scored his first goal and provided an assist in a 5–0 win over Viktoria Köln in the DFB-Pokal.

=== Liverpool ===
On 1 September 2023, the final day of the Premier League transfer window, Gravenberch signed for Liverpool on a five-year contract. The fee, officially undisclosed, was reportedly €40 million. On 16 September, Gravenberch made his debut appearance for Liverpool, entering as an extra-time substitute to replace Mohamed Salah in the 93rd minute in a 3–1 Premier League away victory against Wolverhampton Wanderers.

On 21 September, Gravenberch made a lengthy pass into the box to assist Luis Diaz, his first assist for Liverpool, during a Europa League group stage victory against LASK in which his side won 3–1. On 5 October, Gravenberch scored his first goal for Liverpool in a 2–0 win against Union Saint-Gilloise in the UEFA Europa League. Gravenberch started a number of games in the Premier League in October and November 2023 owing to the absence of regular starter Curtis Jones due to a suspension and then an injury. On 21 April 2024, Gravenberch scored his first Premier League goal in a 3–1 win over Fulham.

At the start of the 2024–25 campaign, Gravenberch was shifted by new manager Arne Slot to a more deep-lying midfield role, accredited to being a central defensive midfielder in Arne Slot's 4-2-3-1 formation. He won plaudits for his early performances in this new position, particularly for his dominance in a 3–0 win over Manchester United at Old Trafford. He was widely praised by pundits for his performances in this new role. On 27 April 2025, Liverpool beat Tottenham Hotspur 5–1 to secure the Premier League title, with Gravenberch providing an assist for Alexis Mac Allister's goal. Gravenberch received praise for his part in Liverpool's successful league campaign and breakthrough in his new midfield role. At the end of the season, Gravenberch was awarded with the Premier League Young Player of the Season award.

On 7 March 2026, Gravenberch signed a new six-year contract with the club, reportedly keeping him at the club until 2032. On 11 October 2026, Gravenberch received his second red card of his senior club career, in the 3-0 defeat against Manchester City at Anfield, having received 2 yellow cards in the match.

== International career ==
Gravenberch was a youth international for the Netherlands. At the age of 15, he represented the Netherlands U17s at the 2018 UEFA European Under-17 Championship, helping his team to victory. At 16, he played for the Netherlands U19s in a friendly 4–1 loss to the England U19s on 5 September 2018.

He was first called up to the senior Netherlands squad in November 2020. He made his debut on 24 March 2021 in a 2022 FIFA World Cup qualifier against Turkey. On 2 June 2021, Gravenberch was named in the Dutch squad for UEFA Euro 2020. Four days later, he scored his first international goal in a 3–0 win against Georgia in a pre-tournament friendly match. At the tournament finals, Gravenberch appeared as a substitute in the team's second group match against Austria, and played the full 90 minutes in the third group match against North Macedonia.

On 4 September 2023, days after signing for Liverpool, Gravenberch declined a call-up to the Netherlands U21s for their European Championship qualification campaign. The team confirmed his absence was a choice to "focus on his new club", with national coach Ronald Koeman and U21s coach Michael Reiziger condemning the decision.

On 29 May 2024, Gravenberch was named in the Netherlands' squad for UEFA Euro 2024.

On 27 May 2026, Gravenberch was named in the Netherlands' squad for the 2026 FIFA World Cup.

== Personal life ==
Gravenberch was born in the Netherlands to Afro-Surinamese parents. In August 2025, Gravenberch and his partner Cindy Peroti announced the birth of their first child, a daughter.

His older brother, Danzell, is a former professional footballer.

== Career statistics ==
=== Club ===
As of match played 24 May 2026

Appearances and goals by club, season and competition
Club	Season	League			National cup (Note: Includes KNVB Cup, DFB-Pokal, FA Cup)		League cup (Note: Includes EFL Cup)		Europe		Other		Total	
Club	Season	Division	Apps	Goals	Apps	Goals	Apps	Goals	Apps	Goals	Apps	Goals	Apps	Goals
Jong Ajax	2018–19	Eerste Divisie	27	2	—		—		—		—		27	2
Jong Ajax	2019–20	Eerste Divisie	17	6	—		—		—		—		17	6
Jong Ajax	Total		44	8	—		—		—		—		44	8
Ajax	2018–19	Eredivisie	1	0	1	1	—		0	0	—		2	1
Ajax	2019–20	Eredivisie	9	2	2	1	—		1 (Note: Appearance(s) in UEFA Europa League)	0	0	0	12	3
Ajax	2020–21	Eredivisie	32	3	4	1	—		11 (Note: Six appearances and one goal in UEFA Champions League, five appearances in UEFA Europa League)	1	—		47	5
Ajax	2021–22	Eredivisie	30	2	3	1	—		8 (Note: Appearances in UEFA Champions League)	0	1 (Note: Appearance in Johan Cruyff Shield)	0	42	3
Ajax	Total		72	7	10	4	—		20	1	1	0	103	12
Bayern Munich	2022–23	Bundesliga	24	0	2	1	—		6	0	1 (Note: Appearance in DFL-Supercup)	0	33	1
Bayern Munich	2023–24	Bundesliga	1	0	—		—		—		0	0	1	0
Bayern Munich	Total		25	0	2	1	—		6	0	1	0	34	1
Liverpool	2023–24	Premier League	26	1	2	1	5	0	5	2	—		38	4
Liverpool	2024–25	Premier League	37	0	0	0	3	0	9	0	—		49	0
Liverpool	2025–26	Premier League	36	5	3	0	0	0	11	1	0	0	50	6
Liverpool	Total		99	6	5	1	8	0	25	3	0	0	137	10
Career total			240	21	17	6	8	0	51	4	2	0	318	31

=== International ===
As of match played 4 October 2026

Appearances and goals by national team and year
National team	Year	Apps	Goals
Netherlands	2021	10	1
Netherlands	2022	1	0
Netherlands	2024	7	0
Netherlands	2025	6	0
Netherlands	2026	11	0
Total		35	1

As of match played 4 October 2026
Netherlands score listed first, score column indicates score after each Gravenberch goal.

List of international goals scored by Ryan Gravenberch
No.	Date	Venue	Cap	Opponent	Score	Result	Competition
1	6 June 2021	De Grolsch Veste, Enschede, Netherlands	5	Georgia	3–0	3–0	Friendly

== Honours ==
Ajax

- Eredivisie: 2018–19, 2020–21, 2021–22
- KNVB Cup: 2018–19, 2020–21

Bayern Munich

- Bundesliga: 2022–23
- DFL-Supercup: 2022

Liverpool

- Premier League: 2024–25
- EFL Cup: 2023–24; runner-up: 2024–25

Netherlands U17

- UEFA European Under-17 Championship: 2018

Individual

- Ajax Talent of the Future (Abdelhak Nouri Award): 2018
- Ajax Talent of the Year (Marco van Basten Award): 2021
- Eredivisie Talent of the Year: 2020–21
- Johan Cruyff Trophy: 2020–21
- Eredivisie Player of the Month: March 2021
- Eredivisie Talent of the Month: March 2022
- Eredivisie Team of the Month: March 2022
- Premier League Young Player of the Season: 2024–25
- Premier League Fan Team of the Season: 2024–25
- The Athletic Premier League Team of the Season: 2024–25
- PFA Team of the Year: 2024–25 Premier League
