= Daniel Crowley (footballer) =

English footballer

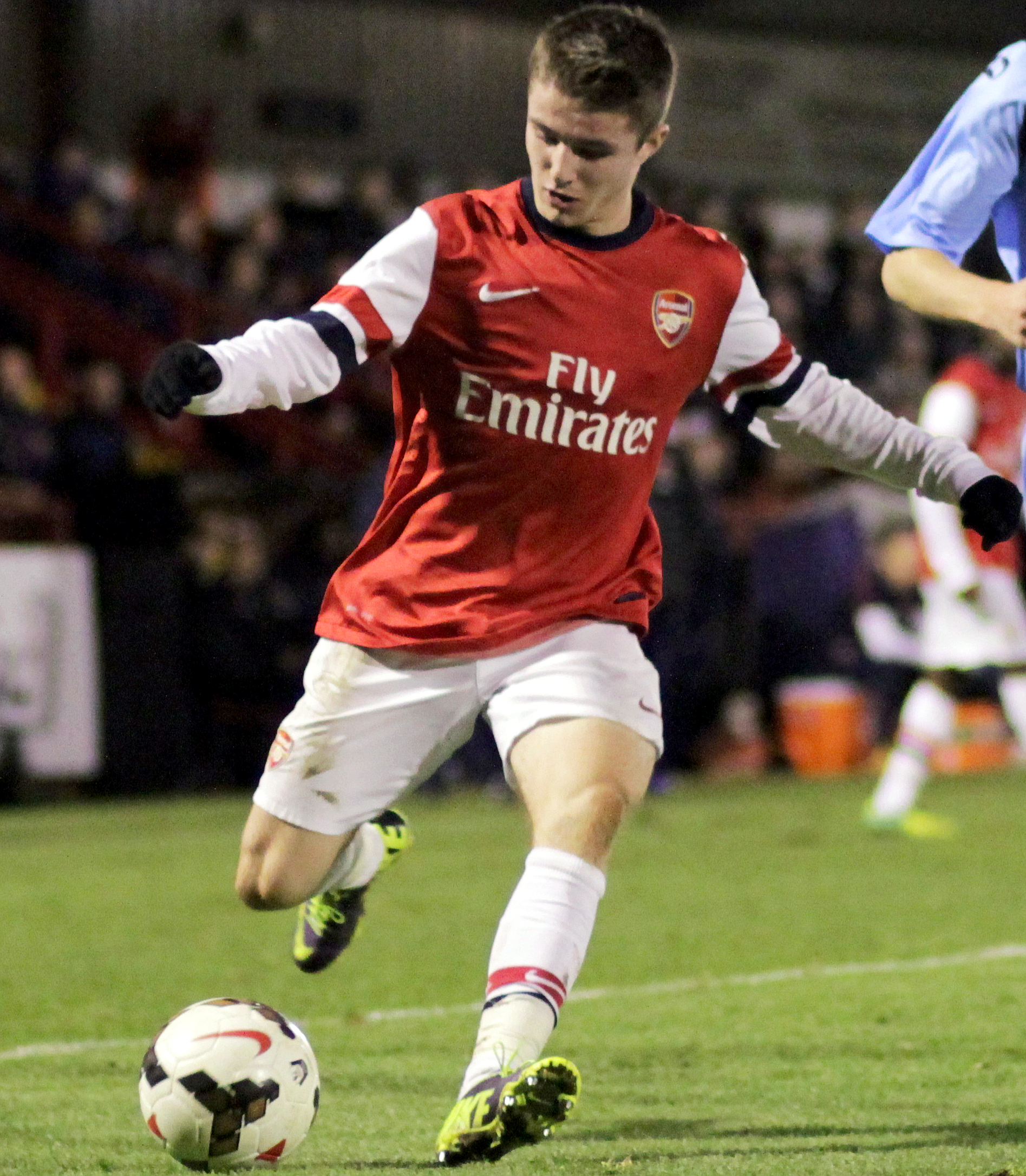
- Crowley playing for Arsenal U21 in 2013

Personal information
- Full name: Daniel Patrick Crowley
- Date of birth: 3 August 1997 (age 29)
- Place of birth: Coventry, England
- Height: 5 ft 9 in (1.74 m)
- Position: Midfielder

Team information
- Current team: Milton Keynes Dons
- Number: 7

Youth career
- –2013: Aston Villa
- 2013–2014: Arsenal

Senior career*
Years	Team	Apps	(Gls)
2014–2017	Arsenal	0	(0)
2015	→ Barnsley (loan)	11	(0)
2016	→ Oxford United (loan)	6	(2)
2017	→ Go Ahead Eagles (loan)	16	(2)
2017–2019	Willem II	44	(5)
2018	→ SC Cambuur (loan)	15	(3)
2019–2021	Birmingham City	41	(1)
2021	→ Hull City (loan)	22	(0)
2021–2022	Cheltenham Town	12	(0)
2022–2023	Willem II	31	(0)
2023	Morecambe	21	(2)
2023–2025	Notts County	64	(19)
2025–	Milton Keynes Dons	48	(1)

International career
2011–2012	England U16	6	(0)
2012	Republic of Ireland U16	2	(0)
2012–2013	England U17	12	(0)
2013	Republic of Ireland U17	2	(0)
2015	England U19	4	(1)
- * Club domestic league appearances and goals as of 2 May 2026 (UTC)

Daniel Patrick Crowley (born 3 August 1997) is a professional footballer who plays as a midfielder for EFL League One club Milton Keynes Dons.

Crowley began his career with the academy of Aston Villa, before moving to Arsenal where he signed his first professional contract. He spent time on loan at League One clubs Barnsley and Oxford United and at Go Ahead Eagles of the Dutch Eredivisie before joining another Eredivisie club, Willem II, in 2017. After 50 appearances in all competitions and a loan spell with second-tier SC Cambuur, Crowley returned to English football with Birmingham City in 2019, and spent time on loan helping Hull City win the 2020–21 League One title before being released by Birmingham at the end of that season. Crowley joined Cheltenham Town on a short-term contract in October 2021, rejoined Willem II in February 2022, and returned to English football with Morecambe a year later. After 18 months with Notts County, Crowley signed for Milton Keynes Dons in January 2025.

He represented both his native England and the Republic of Ireland, his grandparents' country, at youth international level before declaring for Ireland in 2019.

== Early life ==
Crowley was born in Coventry and raised in the Coundon area, where he attended Christ the King Primary School before moving on to Cardinal Newman Catholic School. He has four younger siblings. His father, Dave, came through Coventry City's youth system before playing for and captaining non-league club Nuneaton Borough. As a child Crowley played for his local GAA Club, Roger Casements and participated in the annual Feile na nGael gaelic sports festival. Interviewed as an 18-year-old, Crowley said he did not follow any particular team, although he had "supported Celtic a little bit [as] a kid" and took an interest in his hometown club. He played for Christ the King Juniors before joining Aston Villa's academy at the age of eight; he chose Villa ahead of Coventry City because he enjoyed their training sessions more.

== Club career ==
=== Aston Villa ===
Crowley made appearances for Aston Villa's under-16s at the age of 12 and the under-21s at 15. He was involved in Villa under-19s' victorious 2012–13 NextGen Series campaign, and despite being only 15, was on the bench for the 2–0 win over Chelsea in the final. While with Villa, Crowley earned plaudits for his passing ability, with his playing style likened to that of England international Jack Wilshere. Villa academy director Bryan Jones later commented that Crowley was one of the best players to come through the academy during his time at the club, putting him in the same bracket as Jack Grealish, Daniel Sturridge and Gareth Barry.

=== Arsenal ===
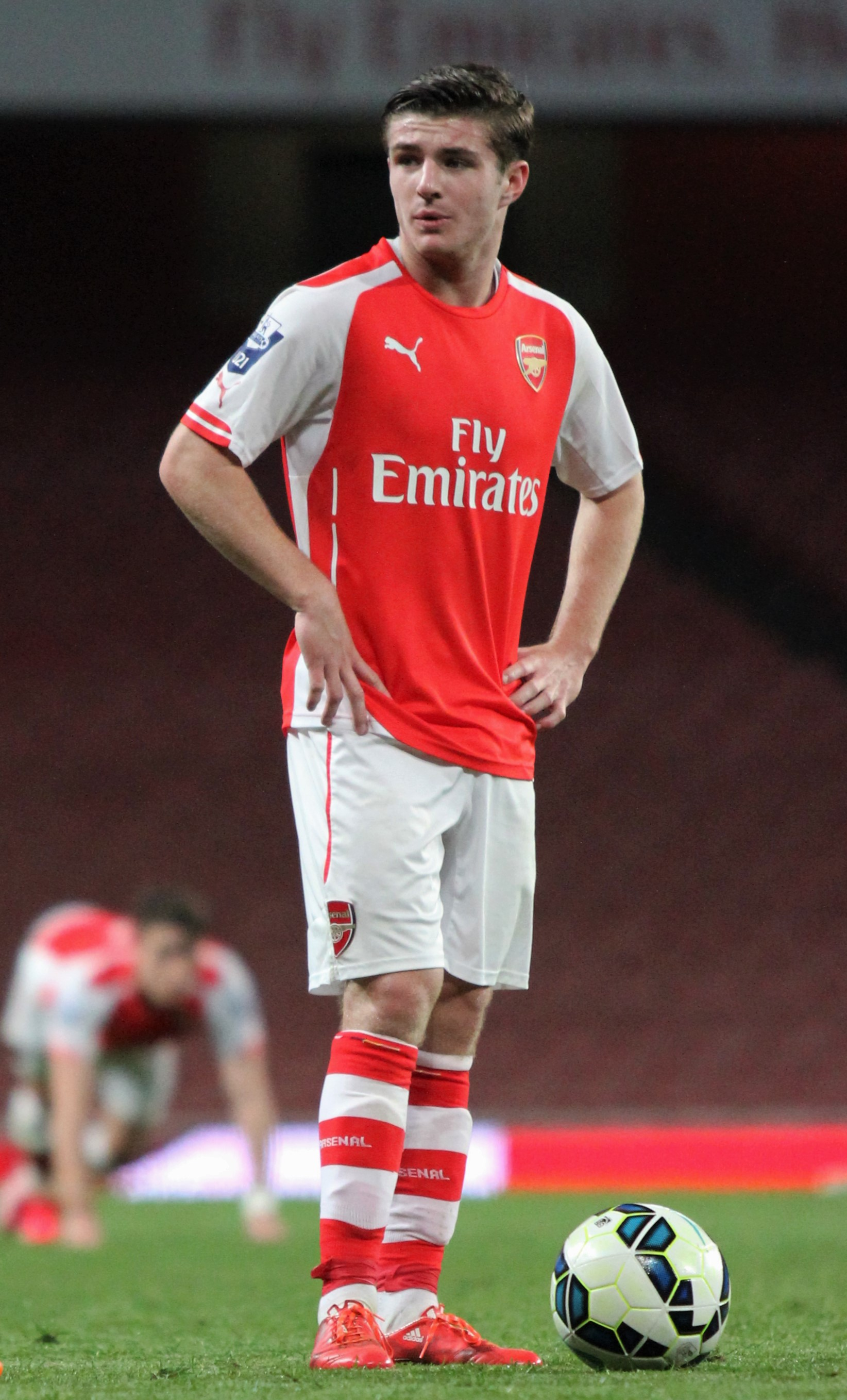
Crowley playing for Arsenal U21 in 2015

During the summer of 2013, the 15-year-old Crowley moved from Aston Villa to Arsenal, Arsène Wenger had personally watched him play against Arsenal's youth sides on at least two occasions and pushed for the signing. Under the terms of the Premier League's Elite Player Performance Plan, Villa were only entitled to limited, fixed-rate compensation because the player was under 16. The club filed a formal complaint, noting that he had represented their under-18 side in the league that season and should be treated as an under-18. Villa's Academy Director, Bryan Jones, commented that compensation at such a level, only £209,000 for nine years of investment, would disincentivise clubs from developing young players in the English game.

Crowley signed his first professional contract as soon as he turned 17. After impressing with Arsenal's under-age teams in his first two seasons, he was included in the first-team squad for the 2015 Premier League Asia Trophy in Singapore.

==== Loan spells ====
On his return, Crowley joined Barnsley on loan until 3 January 2016. He made his senior debut on 9 August in the starting eleven for their opening League One fixture, and played 57 minutes of a 3–1 defeat against Chesterfield. On 26 August, he scored his first senior goal in the 60th minute of a League Cup match at home to Everton, but could not help prevent a comeback from the visitors as Barnsley lost 5–3 after extra time. On 30 October, Crowley's loan was terminated early and he returned to Arsenal. He had made 13 appearances in all competitions, and Barnsley's manager Lee Johnson, himself an Arsenal academy graduate, described him as "the most talented 18-year-old I've ever seen", but also pointed out that "it's important he just gets the balance between ego and confidence".

On 1 July 2016, League One club Oxford United signed Crowley on loan for the season. He scored his first goal for the club on 23 August, an injury-time consolation in a 4–2 EFL Cup second-round defeat to Brighton & Hove Albion, and his first League goal, another injury-time consolation, after coming on as a substitute in a 2–1 defeat to Coventry City on 18 October. In the next match, his full League debut for the club, Crowley scored the second Oxford goal in a 2–2 draw with Port Vale. His loan ended six months early in December 2016 at Oxford's instigation. In a 2018 interview, Crowley admitted that his inability to handle being left out of the team caused a problem: "I started to fall out with people because I wasn't playing. I was getting on the gaffer's nerves and he just said 'You have got to go'." He made 11 appearances in all competitions (6 as a substitute) and scored three goals.

After a successful trial, Crowley joined Dutch club Go Ahead Eagles on 10 January 2017 on loan until the end of the 2016–17 Eredivisie season. He said that playing in a more technical and tactical league than League One, where the long ball predominated, would suit his creative attacking style as well as help him improve the defensive aspects of his game. He made his debut on 13 January with his side losing 1–0 to AZ Alkmaar, and came close to setting up an equaliser when his neat pass was played over the goalkeeper but cleared off the line; AZ won 3–1. Crowley's first goal at De Adelaarshorst for Eagles came late in a 3–1 defeat to Vitesse on 26 February, and he scored with "a fabulous curling effort into the top corner" in a 4–1 loss against Heracles on 8 April. He finished the season with 16 appearances, all but one in the starting eleven, and despite his team being relegated, he was reported to have loved playing every week.

=== Willem II ===
Crowley left Arsenal for another Eredivisie club, Willem II, where he signed a three-year deal on 17 July 2017. He made his debut in the opening game of the season, playing 69 minutes in a 2–1 loss against SBV Excelsior, and started twice more before dropping to the bench where he remained largely unused by manager Erwin van de Looi, for reasons including a change of formation and a disciplinary issue. He was disappointed with the way the first half of his season had panned out, and by the end of January, with only 240 Eredivisie minutes to his name, he agreed to take a significant drop in wages to go out on loan.

==== Loan to SC Cambuur ====
Crowley joined Eerste Divisie (second-tier) club SC Cambuur on 30 January 2018 on loan for the remainder of the season. Cambuur's technical director, Foeke Booy, hoped he would provide the sort of creativity his squad was lacking. He made his SC Cambuur debut as a 68th-minute substitute in a 2–0 loss against MVV Maastricht, started the next, and rapidly became a regular in the side. An assist for Justin Mathieu's winner against Almere City contributed to Crowley's Man of the Match award, and the following week he provided another assist as well as hitting the bar in a 1–1 draw with league leaders NEC.

His first goal for the club, on 30 March in a 2–2 draw with FC Volendam, was followed three days later with an 88th-minute free-kick winner against FC Eindhoven; he started that match on the bench because he had got the kick-off time wrong and turned up late. He scored in the first leg of the play–off first round against FC Dordrecht and assisted in both legs, as Cambuur won 4–1 away only to lose at home by the same score and go out on penalties; Crowley missed his kick. He finished the season with 17 appearances and 4 goals in all competitions.

==== Return to Willem II ====
Crowley quickly established himself as a regular in Willem II's starting eleven for the 2018–19 season. His first goal came on 17 August in a 1–0 win over FC Groningen, and against Fortuna Sittard on 22 September, he set up Willem II's third goal and scored the fourth in a 4–4 draw. He was linked with a possible return to Aston Villa in January 2019, but he did not leave. Between 27 January and 24 February 2019, Crowley scored three goals in five appearances. He helped the team reach the KNVB Cup Final, but was shocked by coach Adrie Koster's decision to leave him out in order to surprise opponents Ajax by adopting a different system. He was a 62nd-minute substitute as Willem II lost 4–0. He made 40 appearances and scored six times in all competitions in the 2018–19 season.

=== Birmingham City ===
Crowley returned to English football in July 2019, signing for Birmingham City of the Championship on a two-year contract with the option of a third. The fee, officially undisclosed, was reported at around £700,000 plus add-ons. He made his debut in the starting eleven for Birmingham's opening fixture of the season, a 1–0 win away against Brentford, and scored his first goal on 4 January 2020 in the FA Cup against Blackburn Rovers. Crowley was a regular in the matchday squad, and when the season resumed after the COVID-19 pandemic-related interruption, he started all nine of the remaining matches, and scored in the 3–3 draw with Hull City that helped the team gain a valuable point in their successful battle against relegation. He played little in the first half of the 2020–21 season, an omission attributed by manager Aitor Karanka to an enforced change of team shape away from one that included his favoured number 10 position. In January 2021, Karanka confirmed that Crowley, together with David Davis and Josh McEachran, were no longer part of his first-team squad. Birmingham chose not to take up the option of a further year on his contract, and confirmed that he would be released when it expired at the end of the season.

==== Loan to Hull City ====
Crowley joined League One club Hull City on 18 January 2021, on loan for the remainder of the 2020–21 season. He made his debut the next day as a substitute for Gavin Whyte in the 3–0 home win against Accrington Stanley, and went on make 23 appearances, mainly from the bench, as Hull City won the 2020–21 League One title.

=== Cheltenham Town ===
Ahead of the 2021–22 season, Crowley played in pre-season friendlies for League One clubs Cheltenham Town, whose manager Michael Duff said they had come close to agreeing terms, and Gillingham. After Cheltenham lost loanee Callum Wright to injury, Duff offered Crowley a short-term contract to run until January 2022, and his signing was confirmed on 2 October 2021. He made his debut on 5 October, playing the whole of the EFL Trophy match against Exeter City, and went on to make 16 appearances in all competitions, 12 in the league. Club and player were unable to agree an extension, so on 4 January 2022, Crowley left Cheltenham following the expiry of his short-term contract.

=== Second return to Willem II ===
Crowley rejoined his former Eredivisie club, Willem II, on 3 February 2022, where he signed a 18-month deal.

=== Morecambe ===
On 10 January 2023, Crowley signed for League One club Morecambe on a short-term contract. Following Morecambe's relegation, all out-of-contract players, including Crowley, were released.

=== Notts County ===
Crowley signed for newly promoted League Two club Notts County in June 2023 on a two-year deal. On his home league debut he headed the winning goal in a 3–2 victory over Grimsby Town, and he went on to score 15 league goals over the season.

=== Milton Keynes Dons ===
Notts County turned down bids from Milton Keynes Dons ahead of the 2024–25 season before, in mid-January 2025, the clubs agreed an improved but undisclosed fee and Crowley signed for the League Two club on a permanent contract. He made his debut on 18 January 2025 in a 4–2 defeat away to Walsall.

On 24 January 2026, Crowley scored his first goal for the club in a 5–1 win over Shrewsbury Town. Although limited to mostly substitute appearances during his second season, he went on to achieve promotion with the club, finishing in second place.

== International career ==
Crowley is eligible to play for both England and Ireland at international level, qualifying for Ireland through his grandparents who are from Waterford and Cork.

Crowley made his debut for England's under-16 team against Northern Ireland in October 2011. Three months later, he was called up to Ireland's under-16 squad for a double-header against Portugal, and made appearances for both countries at under-16 level over the course of the 2011–12 season.

In August 2012, at the age of 15 years and 26 days, Crowley made the first of twelve appearances for England under-17s, against Italy in the St George's Park International Tournament. In February 2013, the Football Association of Ireland announced that Crowley had pledged his allegiance to Ireland and selected him for two under-17 friendlies against Croatia. However, the following month, Crowley returned to the England set-up to play in the 2013 UEFA European Under-17 Championship elite round – his first appearance in a competitive international. He made his final appearance for England under-17s against Italy in September 2013. He was named again in an England under-17 squad in January 2014.

In September 2015, the Irish Times reported that Crowley was on the verge of declaring for Ireland, and Republic of Ireland senior manager Martin O'Neill confirmed that he had spoken to the player's father. However, in early October, Crowley received and accepted his first call-up to an England under-19 squad. He made two appearances in 2016 Under-19 Championship qualifiers and a further two in friendlies that year, and scored his first international goal in a 5–1 win against Japan.

In September 2018, Crowley told the press that he had ambitions to play for Ireland and would welcome contact with manager Martin O'Neill. In February 2019 he stated that the paperwork on his international transfer to Ireland had been submitted to FIFA. O'Neill's successor as Ireland manager, Mick McCarthy, watched Crowley in the KNVB Cup final against Ajax in May, and said he would continue to do so after he joined Birmingham.

== Personal life ==
Crowley has a son with his girlfriend and is a Christian, having been introduced to the Hillsong London megachurch by his friend Benik Afobe.

== Career statistics ==
As of 2 May 2026

Appearances and goals by club, season and competition
Club	Season	League			National Cup (Note: Includes FA Cup, KNVB Cup)		League Cup (Note: Includes EFL Cup)		Other		Total	
Club	Season	Division	Apps	Goals	Apps	Goals	Apps	Goals	Apps	Goals	Apps	Goals
Arsenal	2015–16	Premier League	0	0	0	0	0	0	0	0	0	0
Arsenal	2016–17	Premier League	0	0	0	0	0	0	0	0	0	0
Arsenal	Total		0	0	0	0	0	0	0	0	0	0
Barnsley (loan)	2015–16	League One	11	0	0	0	1	1	1 (Note: Appearance in Football League Trophy)	0	13	1
Oxford United (loan)	2016–17	League One	6	2	0	0	2	1	3 (Note: Appearance(s) in EFL Trophy)	0	11	3
Go Ahead Eagles (loan)	2016–17	Eredivisie	16	2	0	0	—		—		16	2
Willem II	2017–18	Eredivisie	10	0	0	0	—		—		10	0
Willem II	2018–19	Eredivisie	34	5	6	1	—		—		40	6
Willem II	Total		44	5	6	1	—		—		50	6
SC Cambuur (loan)	2017–18	Eerste Divisie	15	3	0	0	—		2 (Note: Appearances in promotion/relegation play-offs)	1	17	4
Birmingham City	2019–20	Championship	38	1	2	1	1	0	—		41	2
Birmingham City	2020–21	Championship	3	0	0	0	1	0	—		4	0
Birmingham City	Total		41	1	2	1	2	0	—		45	2
Hull City	2020–21	League One	22	0	—		—		1	0	23	0
Cheltenham Town	2021–22	League One	12	0	3	0	—		1	0	16	0
Willem II	2021–22	Eredivisie	14	0	—		—		—		14	0
Willem II	2022–23	Eerste Divisie	17	1	1	0	—		—		18	1
Willem II	Total		31	1	1	0	—		—		32	1
Morecambe	2022–23	League One	21	2	—		—		—		21	2
Notts County	2023–24	League Two	46	15	1	1	1	0	2	0	50	16
Notts County	2024–25	League Two	18	4	0	0	1	0	0	0	19	4
Notts County	Total		64	19	1	1	2	0	2	0	69	20
Milton Keynes Dons	2024–25	League Two	18	0	—		—		—		18	0
Milton Keynes Dons	2025–26	League Two	30	1	2	0	0	0	1	0	33	1
Milton Keynes Dons	2026–27	League One	0	0	0	0	0	0	0	0	0	0
Milton Keynes Dons	Total		48	1	2	0	0	0	1	0	51	1
Career total			332	37	15	3	7	2	11	1	365	43

== Honours ==
Aston Villa U19

- NextGen Series: 2012–13

Willem II

- KNVB Cup runner-up 2018–19

Hull City

- EFL League One: 2020–21

Milton Keynes Dons

- EFL League Two second-place promotion: 2025–26

Individual

- PFA Team of the Year: 2023–24 League Two
