= Erik ten Hag =

Dutch football manager (born 1970)

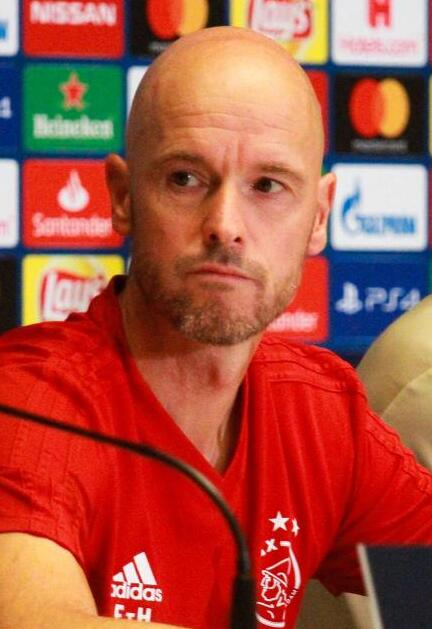
- Ten Hag as manager of Ajax in 2018

Personal information
- Full name: Erik ten Hag
- Date of birth: 2 February 1970 (age 56)
- Place of birth: Haaksbergen, Overijssel, Netherlands
- Height: 1.82 m (6 ft 0 in)
- Position: Centre-back

Team information
- Current team: FC Twente (Technical Director)

Senior career*
Years	Team	Apps	(Gls)
1989–1990	Twente	14	(0)
1990–1992	De Graafschap	54	(6)
1992–1994	Twente	45	(2)
1994–1995	RKC Waalwijk	31	(2)
1995–1996	Utrecht	30	(2)
1996–2002	Twente	162	(3)
Total		336	(15)

Managerial career
- 2012–2013: Go Ahead Eagles
- 2013–2015: Bayern Munich II
- 2015–2017: Utrecht
- 2018–2022: Ajax
- 2022–2024: Manchester United
- 2025: Bayer Leverkusen
- * Club domestic league appearances and goals

Erik ten Hag (Dutch: [tɛn ˈɦɑx] ten HAKH; born 2 February 1970) is a Dutch professional football executive, former manager, and player. He is the technical director of Eredivisie club Twente.

Ten Hag played as a centre-back and began his career with Twente in the Eredivisie. He joined De Graafschap in 1990, and won the Eerste Divisie in his first season. He rejoined Twente in 1992 and transferred to RKC Waalwijk two years later, where he remained for one season before signing with Utrecht in 1995. Ten Hag returned to Twente for a third time in 1996, where he won KNVB Cup in 2001. He retired from playing in 2002 at age 32.

Ten Hag began his managerial career in 2012 at Go Ahead Eagles, where he led the club to promotion to the Eredivisie in his debut season. He then joined Bayern Munich II in 2013, winning promotion to the Regionalliga Bayern in 2014. He returned to the Netherlands in 2015 as head coach and sporting director at Utrecht. He joined Ajax in 2018, where he won three Eredivisie titles, two KNVB Cups, and led the team to the semi-finals of the 2018–19 UEFA Champions League. In 2022, he was appointed manager of Manchester United. During his tenure at the club, United won the EFL Cup and FA Cup in successive seasons, but failed to make significant progress in the Premier League or European competitions. He was dismissed in 2024 following a string of poor results. He was announced as Bayer Leverkusen's new head coach, ahead of the 2025–26 season. He was sacked in September 2025 after having coached just three matches.

== Early life and playing career ==
Erik ten Hag was born on 2 February 1970 in Haaksbergen, Overijssel. He played primarily as a centre-back for Twente, De Graafschap, RKC Waalwijk and Utrecht. He had three stints with Twente, and he captained the side to win the KNVB Cup in the 2000–01 season. He also won the Eerste Divisie with De Graafschap in the 1990–91 season, ten years before winning the cup with Twente. He retired from active playing in 2002 at the age of 32 while playing for Twente, after the end of the 2001–02 Eredivisie season.

== Managerial career ==
=== Early career ===
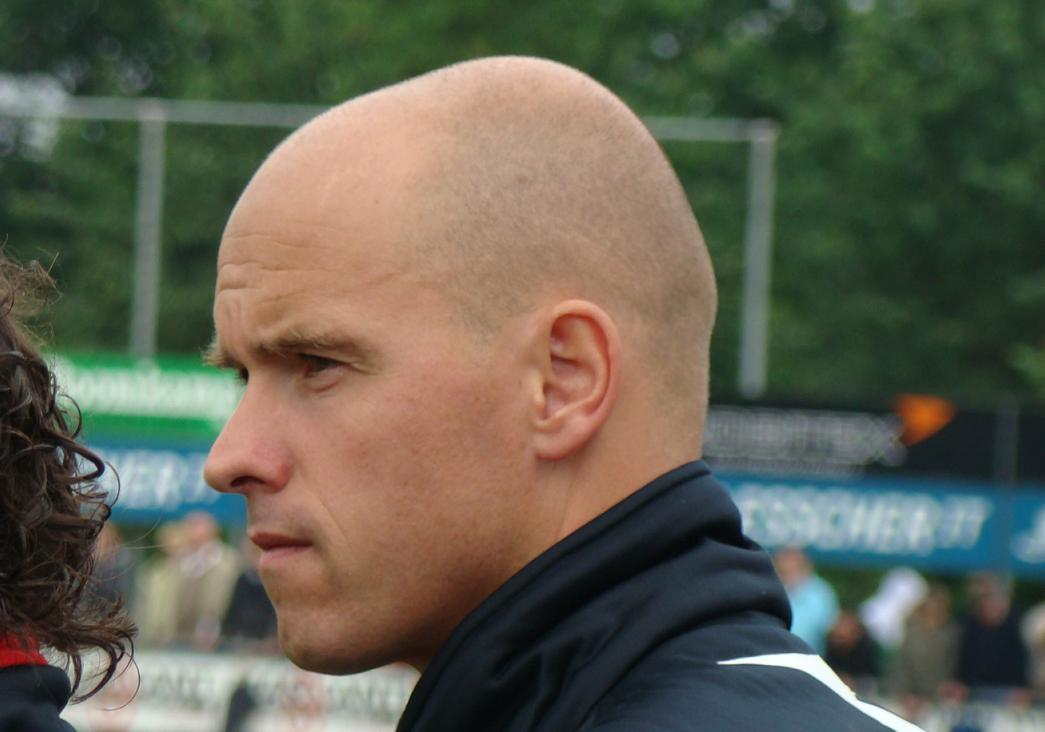
Ten Hag with Twente in 2008

Following his retirement, Ten Hag took on a coaching role at Twente's academy, initially overseeing the U17 team, followed by the U19 team until 2006, when he was promoted to assistant manager. He worked under Fred Rutten and later Steve McClaren until 2009. He then joined PSV, working as an assistant under Rutten once more.

It was announced on 18 April 2012 that Ten Hag would take over as manager of Eerste Divisie club Go Ahead Eagles on a two-year contract, starting from the 2012–13 season. During his only season at Go Ahead Eagles, he led the team to its first promotion in 17 years.

Ten Hag was appointed as Bayern Munich II manager on 27 June 2013 with a two-year contract. He served until 2015, when he was replaced by Heiko Vogel. During his time as manager, Ten Hag led his team to the Regionalliga Bayern title.

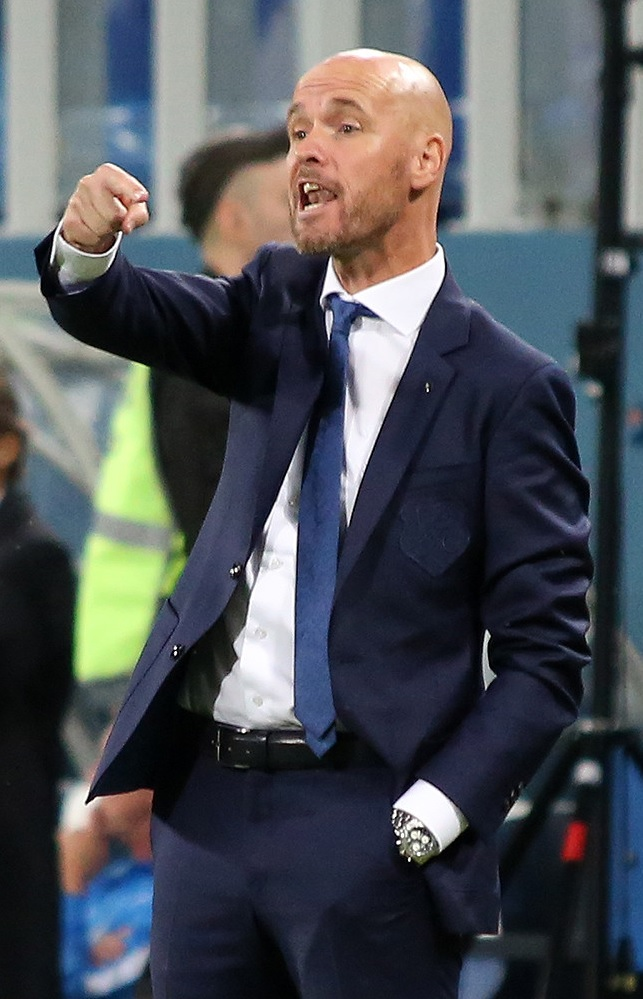
Ten Hag managing Utrecht in 2017

Eredivisie club Utrecht announced on 22 April 2015 that Ten Hag would become the club's head coach and sporting director on a two-year contract starting from 1 July. In his first season, he led the club to the 2016 KNVB Cup final, losing 2–1 to Giovanni van Bronckhorst's Feyenoord; a league finish of fifth put them in the playoffs for a UEFA Europa League place, losing 3–1 on aggregate to Heracles Almelo. The following season, a fourth-place finish put Utrecht in the playoffs again, where they secured a European place on penalties against AZ. Utrecht were sixth when Ten Hag left at the mid-point of the 2017–18 Eredivisie season.

=== Ajax ===
==== 2017–2020: Early seasons, European semi-final ====
On 28 December 2017, Ten Hag was appointed as the head coach of Ajax after the club dismissed Marcel Keizer, and commenced in the role on 1 January 2018 on a two-and-a-half year contract. He signed a deal until June 2020. He arrived at a team that had already been eliminated from the domestic cup, as well as the qualifying rounds of the Champions League and Europa League. His debut on 21 January 2018 was a 2–0 home win in De Klassieker against Feyenoord.

Ten Hag led the team to the semi-finals of the 2018–19 UEFA Champions League for the first time since 1997, by winning against defending champions Real Madrid 4–1 in the Santiago Bernabéu at the round of 16 stage, and also beating Juventus away 1–2 having drawn the first leg 1–1 at home in the quarter-finals. In the first leg of the semi-final, he led his team to a 1–0 win against Tottenham Hotspur in the recently completed Tottenham Hotspur Stadium. However in the second leg, a second-half hat-trick by Lucas Moura for Tottenham Hotspur, with the last goal being scored in the 96th minute to make it 3–2 (3–3 on aggregate) to win on away goals, eliminated Ajax.

He won his first managerial trophy with Ajax on 5 May 2019, the 2018–19 KNVB Cup, beating Willem II in the final. Ten days later, Ajax won the Eredivisie as well, after a 1–4 away victory over De Graafschap, completing a double. At the end of the season, Ten Hag signed a new contract until 2022.

Ajax began their 2019–20 season with a 2–0 victory over PSV in the 2019 Johan Cruyff Shield. During the 2019–20 Eredivisie season, Ajax won 14 and drew two of their first 16 matches. This was followed by successive defeats to Willem II and to AZ. Ajax's form following these defeats fluctuated, with the club going on to lose three further games in their next eight, as well as a second league defeat of the season to AZ. However, due to the emergence of the global COVID-19 pandemic, the Eredivisie season was null and voided, which meant that despite Ajax being top on goal difference to AZ, there wouldn't be an official winner of the 2019–20 Eredivisie season. Ajax's European campaign was relatively less successful compared to the previous season, having finished third in their group in the 2019–20 Champions League and being subsequently relegated to the UEFA Europa League. Ajax was resultantly knocked out by Getafe after a 3–2 aggregate loss in the Round of 32 of the 2019–20 Europa League.

==== 2020–2022: Consecutive league titles ====
Ajax began the 2020–21 season by winning their first three games, before a 1–0 defeat at Groningen, which proved to be one of the two league defeats that Ten Hag's team sustained over the course of the season. On 24 October 2020, Ten Hag led Ajax to a historic 13–0 victory over VVV-Venlo, breaking the Eredivisie record of the biggest recorded victory in the history of the competition. In the Europa League, the team lost 3–2 on aggregate to Roma in the quarter-finals. On 18 April 2021, Ten Hag guided Ajax to their record-extending 20th KNVB Cup with a 2–1 win over Vitesse in the final. Two weeks later, Ten Hag extended his contract with Ajax through to the end of the 2022–23 season.

Ajax began their 2021–22 campaign with a 4–0 defeat in the Johan Cruyff Shield to PSV, before going unbeaten for the first seven league games before a 1–0 home defeat to Utrecht. This proved to be one of Ajax' three league defeats over the season, as Ajax won the title, with results including 5–0 home win over PSV on 24 October 2021. Ajax won all six of their group matches in the 2021–22 UEFA Champions League. On 16 January 2022, Ten Hag became the fastest manager in league history to reach 100 wins with Ajax, achieving the feat in 128 matches, when his side beat Utrecht 3–0 away on match day 19.

Ajax were eventually knocked out by Benfica in the round of 16, while winning their third Eredivisie title in four years, after a 5–0 home victory over Heerenveen on 11 May 2022. Ten Hag's side also reached the 2022 KNVB Cup Final, which ended in a 2–1 defeat to PSV.

=== Manchester United ===
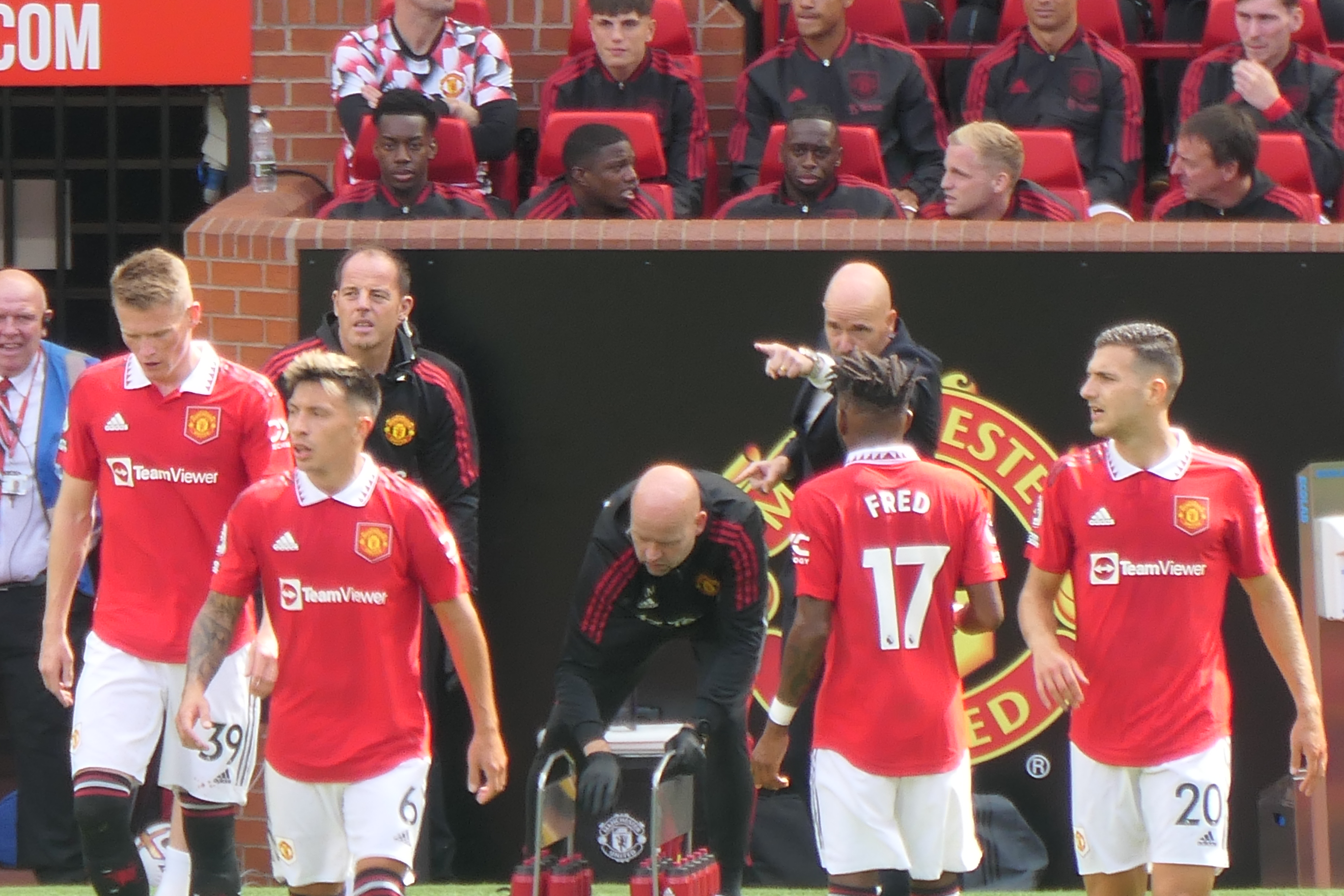
Ten Hag managing Manchester United in 2022

On 21 April 2022, Ten Hag was appointed as manager of Manchester United starting from the end of the 2021–22 season until June 2025, with the option of extending for a further year. Mitchell van der Gaag and Steve McClaren joined Ten Hag as part of his coaching staff. On 16 May, it was confirmed that Ten Hag had left his Ajax role early to begin his preparations as Manchester United manager for the 2022–23 season.

==== 2022–23: Top three finish and EFL Cup win ====
Ten Hag lost his first Premier League match, 2–1 at home to Brighton & Hove Albion on 7 August. Following a 4–0 defeat away to Brentford on 13 August in his second Premier League match, Ten Hag became the first Manchester United manager since John Chapman in 1921 to lose his first two games in charge. On 22 August, Ten Hag won his first competitive game as Manchester United manager when his side recorded a 2–1 victory against arch-rivals Liverpool at Old Trafford. This was United's first league win against Liverpool since March 2018. On 11 January 2023, Ten Hag led Manchester United to a 3–0 win over Charlton Athletic in the EFL Cup, and in doing so became the fastest Manchester United manager to reach 20 competitive wins, achieving the feat in 27 games. On 26 February, Ten Hag's side beat Newcastle United 2–0 to win the EFL Cup, claiming their first trophy since 2017. However, in their first league game after lifting the trophy, Ten Hag's side lost a record 7–0 at Anfield, home of their rivals Liverpool. It was the heaviest defeat in the history of that fixture, as well as United's joint-heaviest defeat ever, and the first time they had conceded seven goals since 1931.

In his first season at the club, Ten Hag also led Manchester United to a place in the 2023–24 UEFA Champions League, by finishing third place in the top four of the Premier League, and also got to the 2023 FA Cup final, eventually losing to local rivals Manchester City, with a scoreline of 2–1.

==== 2023–24: Struggles and FA Cup triumph ====
Manchester United began the 2023–24 season with a 1–0 win in the Premier League over Wolverhampton Wanderers on 14 August. On 1 November, Manchester United exited the EFL Cup in the fourth round with a 3–0 loss at home to Newcastle United, who they beat in the final the season prior. Ten Hag was awarded Premier League Manager of the Month for November. On 12 December, Manchester United exited the Champions League after losing 1–0 to Bayern Munich, finishing bottom of their group with 4 points assuring no European football for the rest of the season. Manchester United ended the Premier League season with a 2–0 win against Brighton to finish in eighth place with 60 points, their lowest position in the top flight since the 1989–90 season.

On 25 May 2024, Manchester United won the FA Cup final against Manchester City, earning Ten Hag a second major trophy with the club and securing a spot in the 2024–25 UEFA Europa League.

==== 2024: Dip in performances and dismissal ====
On 4 July 2024, Manchester United triggered a one-year extension to Ten Hag's contract to keep him with the club until 2026. Former Manchester United striker Ruud van Nistelrooy and René Hake joined as assistant managers as a replacement for Mitchell van der Gaag, who left his role. Coach Steve McClaren also resigned from his role at United to take on the manager position for Jamaica.

Manchester United started the 2024–25 season by playing against Manchester City in the 2024 FA Community Shield. The game ended in a 1–1 draw, and United lost 7–6 on penalties. On 6 October 2024, after failing to beat Porto in the Europa League and Aston Villa in the Premier League in the same week, and with United 14th in the league table with eight points from seven games – the club's worst start in the league since 1989–90 – the BBC asked if the team's poor performances warranted Ten Hag's dismissal.

On 28 October 2024, Ten Hag was dismissed from his role as head coach at Manchester United. This came after a string of poor results, having drawn away against Fenerbahçe in the Europa League and having lost 2–1 away in the league against West Ham United, through a controversial penalty which was converted by Jarrod Bowen in added time. These results left Manchester United in 14th place in the Premier League with 11 points from nine games, and with three points from three games in the Europa League. Assistant manager Ruud van Nistelrooy succeeded Ten Hag as interim manager. On 1 November, Manchester United announced the appointment of Ruben Amorim as a permanent replacement, and that he would begin his tenure at the club on 11 November.

=== Bayer Leverkusen ===
On 26 May 2025, Ten Hag was appointed head coach of Bundesliga club Bayer Leverkusen, signing a contract through 2027 and starting his job at the club from 1 July, succeeding Xabi Alonso.

Ten Hag's short tenure at the club would quickly turn ugly. A report by German outlet BILD alleged that Ten Hag employed unusual tactics such as prioritizing push-ups over running and passing while repeatedly clashing with upper management over player transfers by only suggesting players from Ten Hag's own agency, SEG. He failed to connect with anyone at the club and his actions alienated virtually the entire club and "turned all departments, bodies, and players against him". This was further evident after Leverkusen lost its home opener 2–1 against Hoffenheim in which Ten Hag did not give a pre-match speech, much to the surprise of his players. The next game would prove to be the boiling point in which Leverkusen drew 3–3 despite initially having a 3–1 lead against Werder Bremen.

This culminated into Leverkusen sacking Ten Hag on 1 September 2025, after two Bundesliga games and three total competitive games in charge, setting a new record for the fewest league matches in charge before being dismissed in Germany. Kasper Hjulmand was brought in as his replacement on 8 September.

=== FC Twente ===
On 1 February 2026, Ten Hag was appointed as Eredivisie club Twente's sporting director. Ten Hag signed a contract until 2028, replacing Jan Streuer who departed from the club at the beginning of the 2026–27 Eredivisie season.

== Personal life ==
Ten Hag and his wife, Bianca, have two daughters and a son.

== Career statistics ==
Appearances and goals by club, season and competition
Club	Season	League			KNVB Cup		Europe		Other		Total	
Club	Season	Division	Apps	Goals	Apps	Goals	Apps	Goals	Apps	Goals	Apps	Goals
Twente	1989–90	Eredivisie	14	0	2	0	0	0	—		16	0
De Graafschap	1990–91	Eerste Divisie	37	5	2	0	—		—		39	5
De Graafschap	1991–92	Eredivisie	17	1	0	0	—		—		17	1
De Graafschap	Total		54	6	2	0	—		—		56	6
Twente	1992–93	Eredivisie	24	1	2	0	—		—		26	1
Twente	1993–94	Eredivisie	21	1	1	0	1 (Note: Appearance(s) in UEFA Cup)	0	—		23	1
Twente	Total		45	2	3	0	1	0	—		49	2
RKC Waalwijk	1994–95	Eredivisie	31	2	1	0	—		—		32	2
Utrecht	1995–96	Eredivisie	30	2	3	0	—		—		33	2
Twente	1996–97	Eredivisie	26	1	3	0	—		—		29	1
Twente	1997–98	Eredivisie	33	0	3	0	5	0	—		41	0
Twente	1998–99	Eredivisie	29	0	4	0	4 (Note: Appearances in UEFA Intertoto Cup)	0	—		37	0
Twente	1999–2000	Eredivisie	30	2	4	0	—		—		34	2
Twente	2000–01	Eredivisie	28	0	8	1	—		—		36	1
Twente	2001–02	Eredivisie	16	0	1	0	2	0	1 (Note: Appearance in Johan Cruyff Shield)	0	20	0
Twente	Total		162	3	23	1	11	0	1	0	197	4
Career total			336	15	34	1	12	0	1	0	383	16

== Managerial statistics ==
As of 1 September 2025

Managerial record by team and tenure
Team	From	To	Record					Ref.
Team	From	To	P	W	D	L	Win %	Ref.
Go Ahead Eagles	1 July 2012	27 June 2013	39	18	11	10	46.15	
Bayern Munich II	27 June 2013	30 June 2015	72	48	10	14	66.67	
Utrecht	1 July 2015	28 December 2017	111	56	26	29	50.45	
Ajax	1 January 2018	16 May 2022	215	158	28	29	73.49	
Manchester United	23 May 2022	28 October 2024	128	70	23	35	54.69	
Bayer Leverkusen	1 July 2025	1 September 2025	3	1	1	1	33.33	
Total			568	351	99	118	61.80	

== Honours ==
=== Player ===
De Graafschap

- Eerste Divisie: 1990–91

Twente

- KNVB Cup: 2000–01

=== Manager ===
Bayern Munich II

- Regionalliga Bayern: 2013–14

Utrecht

- KNVB Cup runner-up: 2015–16

Ajax

- Eredivisie: 2018–19, 2020–21, 2021–22
- KNVB Cup: 2018–19, 2020–21; runner-up: 2021–22
- Johan Cruyff Shield: 2019

Manchester United

- FA Cup: 2023–24; runner-up: 2022–23
- EFL Cup: 2022–23

Individual

- Rinus Michels Award: 2015–16, 2018–19, 2020–21
- Premier League Manager of the Month: September 2022, February 2023, November 2023
