= Sander Vereijken =

Dutch footballer (born 1997)

Personal information
- Date of birth: 5 April 1997 (age 29)
- Place of birth: Helmond, Netherlands
- Height: 1.77 m (5 ft 10 in)
- Positions: Left winger; attacking midfielder

Team information
- Current team: ASV Geel
- Number: 8

Youth career
- –2018: Mierlo-Hout

Senior career*
Years	Team	Apps	(Gls)
2018–2019	Gemert	7	(1)
2019–2022	Helmond Sport	92	(4)
2022–2025	KVV Berg en Dal	38	(6)
2025–	ASV Geel	0	(0)
- * Club domestic league appearances and goals as of 07:49, 15 January 2026 (UTC)

Sander Vereijken (born 5 April 1997) is a Dutch footballer who plays as a midfielder for ASV Geel.

== Career ==
Born in Helmond, Vereijken played for Mierlo-Hout and VV Gemert before, in the summer of 2019, Vereijken joined Eerste Divisie side Helmond Sport on a two-year contract with the option for a further year. He made his debut for Helmond Sport on 9 August 2019 in a 1–1 draw at home to FC Volendam, Helmond Sport's first game of the season.

His contract with Helmond Sport was terminated by mutual consent on 20 July 2022.
