= Ale de Boer =

Dutch footballer

Personal information
- Date of birth: 28 August 1987 (age 39)
- Place of birth: Roodkerk, Netherlands
- Position: Defender

Youth career
- TTBC
- Cambuur

Senior career*
Years	Team	Apps	(Gls)
2006–2010	Cambuur	16	(0)
2010–2011	Harkemase Boys	20	(1)
2011–2019	ONS Sneek	149	(30)
- * Club domestic league appearances and goals

Ale de Boer (born 28 August 1987) is a Dutch former football player.

== Club career ==
De Boer played professionally for Eerste Divisie side SC Cambuur.

Cambuur released him in 2010 with him joining Topklasse side Harkemase Boys. A year later he moved on to ONS Sneek.

De Boer retired from football in 2019 after eight years with ONS Sneek.
