= Johan Kulhan =

Dutch footballer (born 1992)

Personal information
- Full name: Johan Kulhan
- Date of birth: 7 January 1992 (age 34)
- Place of birth: Amsterdam, Netherlands
- Height: 1.84 m (6 ft 1/2 in)
- Position: Right back

Team information
- Current team: AFC
- Number: 2

Youth career
- AZ

Senior career*
Years	Team	Apps	(Gls)
2012–2015	Telstar	91	(7)
2015–2016	FC Emmen	14	(0)
2016–	AFC	104	(0)
- * Club domestic league appearances and goals as of 24 January 2020

Johan Kulhan (born 7 January 1992 in Amsterdam) is a Dutch professional footballer who played as a right back for AFC in the Dutch Tweede Divisie until 2025. He formerly played for Telstar and FC Emmen. Nowadays he is studying an Orthodontics Masters in Valencia, Spain.
