= Noussair Mazraoui =

Moroccan footballer (born 1997)

- Mazraoui with Morocco in 2026

Personal information
- Full name: Noussair Mazraoui
- Date of birth: 14 November 1997 (age 29)
- Place of birth: Leiderdorp, Netherlands
- Height: 1.83 m (6 ft 0 in)
- Position: Defender

Team information
- Current team: Manchester United
- Number: 3

Youth career
- 2002–2005: AVV Alphen
- 2005–2006: Alphense Boys
- 2006–2016: Ajax

Senior career*
Years	Team	Apps	(Gls)
2016–2020	Jong Ajax	56	(12)
2017–2022	Ajax	93	(6)
2022–2024	Bayern Munich	38	(1)
2024–	Manchester United	63	(0)

International career^{‡}
- Morocco U20
2018–	Morocco	55	(3)
Medal record
Men's football
Representing Morocco
Africa Cup of Nations
Winner	2025 Morocco
- * Club domestic league appearances and goals as of 21:08, 22 November 2026 (UTC) ‡ National team caps and goals as of 21:27, 20 November 2026 (UTC)

Noussair Mazraoui (Note: Arabic: نُصَيْر مَزرَاوِيّ) (born 14 November 1997) is a professional footballer who plays as a defender for Premier League club Manchester United and the Morocco national team. A versatile player, primarily a right-back, Mazraoui has featured at both full-back positions and at centre-back.

Mazraoui is a graduate of the Ajax Youth Academy. He made 137 appearances for the club's first-team, winning three Eredivisie titles and two KNVB Cups. He was signed by Bayern Munich in 2022, and won the Bundesliga title in his debut season. After two seasons with Bayern, he joined Manchester United in August 2024.

Born in the Netherlands, Mazraoui has represented Morocco at youth and senior international level. He has made more than 50 appearances for the senior national team since making his debut in September 2018. He was a member of the Morocco squads that reached the semi-finals of the 2022 FIFA World Cup and won the 2025 Africa Cup of Nations.

== Club career ==
=== Ajax ===
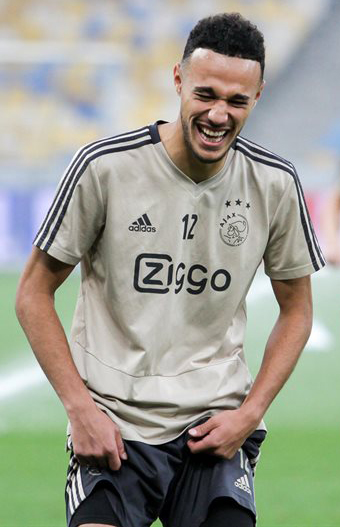
Mazraoui with Ajax in 2018

Mazraoui grew up in Alphen aan den Rijn and started playing for local club AVV Alphen at age 4. He moved to Alphense Boys three years later, where he only played for a year, before being invited to play in the youth academy of Ajax. He made his professional debut with Jong Ajax on 12 August 2016 in an Eerste Divisie game against Almere City, replacing Richairo Živković after 86 minutes.

On 4 February 2018, he made his Eredivisie debut, coming off the bench to substitute David Neres, in a 3–1 victory over NAC Breda. In the following season, on 2 October 2018, he scored his first Champions League goal in a 1–1 away draw against Bayern Munich, followed by the only goal in the 92nd minute of stoppage time in a 1–0 victory over Benfica on 23 October. On 16 December 2018, he netted his first Eredivisie goal in an 8–0 thrashing of De Graafschap. During his breakthrough season, he was named Ajax Talent of the Year, in which he won the domestic double with the club, played in the Champions League semi-finals, and scored four goals in a total of 48 matches.

On 25 October 2020, Mazraoui scored his third Champions League goal in a 3–1 victory against Midtjylland, in which Ajax eventually managed to win another domestic double in the 2020–21 season. In the 2021–22 Champions League, he was part of the team which won all their six matches in the group stage. In his last season at Ajax, he managed to score five goals, all in the league, and provide four assists in 35 matches in all competitions.

=== Bayern Munich ===
On 24 May 2022, Mazraoui signed a four-year deal with Bayern Munich, starting from 1 July. In January 2023, he had an inflammation in his pericardium after suffering from COVID-19, which would rule him out for six to eight weeks. On 13 May 2023, Mazraoui scored his first goal for the club in a 6–0 home win against Schalke 04 at the Allianz Arena.

In October 2023, during the Gaza war, Mazraoui shared a Pro-Palestinian video via Instagram wishing "victory to our oppressed brothers in Palestine", which was met with criticism from German Bundestag member Johannes Steiniger who demanded his extradition from the country. Furthermore, after backlash within the Bundesliga and Germany MPs, Mazraoui then emphasised that he was against all types of terrorism, hatred and violence. A few days after Mazraoui's public apology, as well as a personal conversation of him with the club management; Bayern Munich announced that there would be no consequences. Following a Champions League match against Galatasaray in Istanbul, the club officials held talks with both Mazraoui and his Bayern Munich Israeli teammate Daniel Peretz; in addition, the former expressed willingness to meet members of Makkabi Deutschland. A week later, Mazraoui met with representatives of the Jewish Community of Munich and Upper Bavaria, including their President Charlotte Knobloch.

=== Manchester United ===
On 13 August 2024, Mazraoui signed for Premier League club Manchester United on a four-year deal. On 16 August, he made his debut in the Premier League and for United in a 1–0 win against Fulham in the league. In October that year, he underwent a minor procedure after experiencing heart palpitations. Mazraoui caused some controversy when he refused to wear a rainbow jacket in support of the LGBTQ+ community, citing religious reasons. This caused the club to abandon their plans to wear the jacket.

== Personal life ==
Mazraoui was born in Leiderdorp in the Netherlands to Moroccan parents from Tétouan Province. He is a devout Muslim.

== International career ==
Mazraoui was eligible to represent the Netherlands or Morocco at international level. He played youth international football for Morocco at under-20 level. He made his debut for the senior Morocco national team in September 2018, against Malawi.

On 10 November 2021, Mazraoui revealed that the relationship between him and Moroccan national team coach Vahid Halilhodžić had deteriorated following a clash. On 13 March 2022, Mazraoui and his Morocco teammate, Hakim Ziyech, both rejected Halilhodžić's invitation to represent Morocco in a World Cup qualification match against DR Congo.

He later returned to the national team after Halilhodžić was replaced by Walid Regragui and was named in Morocco's 26-man squad for the 2022 World Cup in Qatar. He played a big role in Morocco's run to the semi-finals, helping them become the first African side to reach this stage at a World Cup.

On 28 December 2023, Mazraoui was among the 27 players selected by coach Walid Regragui to represent Morocco in the 2023 Africa Cup of Nations. He was also included in the squad called up for 2025 Africa Cup of Nations. Mazraoui helped Morocco, the host nation, advance to the final, where they faced Senegal who defeated Morocco 1–0. However, in March 2026, the result was overturned due to the Senegal players walking off the pitch to protest a refereeing decision, handing Morocco the title.

On 26 May 2026, Mazraoui was selected for the 26-man squad for the 2026 FIFA World Cup.

== Style of play ==
Renowned for his versatility, Mazraoui can play in several positions, but is most comfortable playing on the right side of defence. His versatility and mastery of the basics of football led to former United manager Erik ten Hag starting him as an attacking midfielder in a UEFA Europa League tie against Fenerbahçe. During the tenure of Ruben Amorim, he featured as both a right-sided centre-back and a right wing-back in Amorim's signature 3-4-3 formation.

== Career statistics ==
=== Club ===
As of match played 22 November 2026

Appearances and goals by club, season and competition
Club	Season	League			National cup (Note: Includes KNVB Cup, DFB-Pokal, FA Cup)		League cup (Note: Includes EFL Cup)		Europe		Other		Total	
Club	Season	Division	Apps	Goals	Apps	Goals	Apps	Goals	Apps	Goals	Apps	Goals	Apps	Goals
Jong Ajax	2016–17	Eerste Divisie	33	6	—		—		—		—		33	6
Jong Ajax	2017–18	Eerste Divisie	22	6	—		—		—		—		22	6
Jong Ajax	2019–20	Eerste Divisie	1	0	—		—		—		—		1	0
Jong Ajax	Total		56	12	—		—		—		—		56	12
Ajax	2017–18	Eredivisie	8	0	0	0	—		0	0	—		8	0
Ajax	2018–19	Eredivisie	28	1	3	1	—		17 (Note: Appearances in UEFA Champions League)	2	—		48	4
Ajax	2019–20	Eredivisie	13	0	1	0	—		6	0	0	0	20	0
Ajax	2020–21	Eredivisie	19	0	1	0	—		6	1	—		26	1
Ajax	2021–22	Eredivisie	25	5	1	0	—		8	0	1 (Note: Appearance in Johan Cruyff Shield)	0	35	5
Ajax	Total		93	6	6	1	—		37	3	1	0	137	10
Bayern Munich	2022–23	Bundesliga	19	1	1	0	—		5	0	1 (Note: Appearance in DFL-Supercup)	0	26	1
Bayern Munich	2023–24	Bundesliga	19	0	1	0	—		8	0	1	0	29	0
Bayern Munich	Total		38	1	2	0	—		13	0	2	0	55	1
Manchester United	2024–25	Premier League	37	0	3	0	3	0	14 (Note: Appearances in UEFA Europa League)	0	—		57	0
Manchester United	2025–26	Premier League	20	0	0	0	0	0	—		—		20	0
Manchester United	2026–27	Premier League	6	0	0	0	1	0	2	0	—		9	0
Manchester United	Total		63	0	3	0	4	0	16	0	—		86	0
Career total			250	19	11	1	4	0	66	3	3	0	334	23

=== International ===
As of match played 17 November 2026

Appearances and goals by national team and year
National team	Year	Apps	Goals
Morocco	2018	3	0
Morocco	2019	7	1
Morocco	2020	2	1
Morocco	2022	8	0
Morocco	2023	7	0
Morocco	2024	4	0
Morocco	2025	7	0
Morocco	2026	17	1
Total		55	3

Scores and results list Morocco's goal tally first.

List of international goals scored by Noussair Mazraoui
No.	Date	Venue	Opponent	Score	Result	Competition
1.	19 November 2019	Intwari Stadium, Bujumbura, Burundi	Burundi	1–0	3–0	2021 Africa Cup of Nations qualification
2.	13 October 2020	Prince Moulay Abdellah Stadium, Rabat, Morocco	DR Congo	1–0	1–1	Friendly
3.	25 September 2026	Prince Moulay Abdellah Stadium, Rabat, Morocco	Gabon	1–0	2–0	2027 Africa Cup of Nations qualification

== Honours ==
Ajax

- Eredivisie: 2018–19, 2020–21, 2021–22
- KNVB Cup: 2018–19, 2020–21
- Johan Cruyff Shield: 2019

Bayern Munich

- Bundesliga: 2022–23
- DFL-Supercup: 2022

Manchester United

- UEFA Europa League runner-up: 2024–25

Morocco

- Africa Cup of Nations: 2025

Individual

- Eredivisie Talent of the Month: November 2018
- Ajax Talent of the Year: 2018–19
- Ajax Goal of the Season: 2021–22
- Africa Cup of Nations Team of the Tournament: 2025

Orders

- Order of the Throne: 2022
