= Milan Hoek =

Dutch footballer (born 1991)

Personal information
- Date of birth: 8 September 1991 (age 35)
- Place of birth: Zwanenburg, Netherlands
- Height: 1.72 m (5 ft 8 in)
- Position: Midfielder

Team information
- Current team: Swift

Youth career
- Berdos
- 2009–2012: AZ

Senior career*
Years	Team	Apps	(Gls)
2008–2009	AFC '34		
2011–2013	AZ	0	(0)
2011–2012	→ Telstar (loan)	13	(0)
2013–2017	Quick Boys	68	(3)
2017–2026	AFC	226	(18)
2026–	Swift		
Total		307	(21)
- * Club domestic league appearances and goals as of 23 June 2026

Milan Hoek (born 8 September 1991) is a Dutch footballer who plays as a midfielder for Swift.

== Career ==
Born in Zwanenburg and raised in Bergen, Hoek played for amateur sides Berdos and AFC '34 before joining AZ, who loaned him to Telstar. He then moved to Quick Boys in 2013, only to announce his departure after 4 years at the club. He then joined AFC.

In summer 2026, Hoek swapped AFC after 9 years for fellow amateur side Swift.
