= Khalid Tadmine =

Dutch footballer (born 1995)

Personal information
- Date of birth: 7 February 1995 (age 31)
- Place of birth: Amsterdam, Netherlands
- Height: 1.72 m (5 ft 8 in)
- Position: Winger

Team information
- Current team: VVOG

Youth career
- SC Buitenboys
- –2006: SV Almere
- 2006–2012: Almere City

Senior career*
Years	Team	Apps	(Gls)
2012–2018	Almere City	22	(2)
2016–2018	Jong Almere City	52	(23)
2018–2021	Koninklijke HFC	42	(23)
2021–2024	IJsselmeervogels	40	(5)
2023–2024	→ VVOG (loan)		
2024–	VVOG		
- * Club domestic league appearances and goals as of 16:39, 22 November 2024 (UTC)

Khalid Tadmine (born 7 February 1995) is a Dutch footballer who plays as a winger for VVOG in the Dutch Vierde Divisie. He has Moroccan descent

== Club career ==
He made his professional debut in the Eerste Divisie for Almere City FC on 14 September 2012 in a game against SC Cambuur.
