= 2019 Johan Cruyff Shield =

Football competition

Johan Cruijff Schaal XXIV
Ajax	PSV Eindhoven
2	0
- Date: 27 July 2019
- Venue: Johan Cruyff Arena, Amsterdam
- Referee: Dennis Higler
- Attendance: 51,837

The 2019 Johan Cruyff Shield was the 24th edition of the Johan Cruyff Shield (Dutch: Johan Cruijff Schaal), an annual Dutch football match played between the winners of the previous season's Eredivisie and KNVB Cup. The match was contested by Ajax, as both the 2018–19 Eredivisie champion and the 2018–19 KNVB Cup winners, and PSV Eindhoven as runners-up of the Eredivisie. The match was held on 27 July 2019 at the home of the Eredivisie champions Ajax, the Johan Cruyff Arena in Amsterdam.

Ajax won the match 2–0 for their ninth Johan Cruyff Shield.

== Background ==
The Johan Cruyff Shield is the traditional first match of the new football season in the Netherlands. It had been played every year since 1991 as the curtain raiser between the Eredivisie champions and the KNVB Cup winners. On occasions when a team has won the league and cup double, the league runners-up have contested the match. Originally played a predetermined venue, the match has been played at the home of the Eredivisie winners since 2017.

Ajax completed a domestic double in the 2018–19 season, winning the Eredivisie title by just three points over PSV and the KNVB Cup after a 4–0 win against Willem II. As a result, they hosted the match at the Johan Cruyff Arena. They had previously won the shield on eight occasions and come runner-up a further 10 times.

As league runners-up, PSV took the vacant place left by Ajax's success. PSV had won the trophy on 11 previous occasions – the most successful club in the tournament's history – and finished runner-up a further six times.

== Match ==
=== Details ===
27 July 2019
18:00 CEST

Ajax	2–0	PSV Eindhoven
Dolberg 1'; Blind 53'	Report

Johan Cruyff Arena, Amsterdam
Attendance: 51,837
Referee: Dennis Higler

Ajax	PSV Eindhoven

GK	24	(Cameroon) André Onana
RB	3	(Netherlands) Joël Veltman	(yellow card) 63'
CB	2	(Netherlands) Perr Schuurs
CB	21	(Argentina) Lisandro Martínez		(substituted off) 59'
LB	28	(United States) Sergiño Dest	(yellow card) 78'
CM	18	(Romania) Răzvan Marin
CM	17	(Netherlands) Daley Blind		(substituted off) 83'
RW	10	(Serbia) Dušan Tadić (c)
AM	6	(Netherlands) Donny van de Beek
LW	11	(Netherlands) Quincy Promes		(substituted off) 59'
CF	25	(Denmark) Kasper Dolberg
Substitutions:
GK	1	(Portugal) Bruno Varela
GK	33	(Croatia) Dominik Kotarski
DF	5	(Netherlands) Kik Pierie
DF	12	(Morocco) Noussair Mazraoui
DF	16	(Argentina) Lisandro Magallán		(substituted in) 83'
MF	8	(Netherlands) Carel Eiting
MF	20	(Denmark) Lasse Schöne		(substituted in) 59'
MF	22	(Morocco) Hakim Ziyech		(substituted in) 59'
MF	26	(Netherlands) Jurgen Ekkelenkamp
MF	27	(Netherlands) Noa Lang
MF	30	(Netherlands) Dani de Wit
FW	9	(Netherlands) Klaas-Jan Huntelaar
Manager:
(Netherlands) Erik ten Hag

GK	1	(Netherlands) Jeroen Zoet
RB	22	(Netherlands) Denzel Dumfries
CB	3	(Netherlands) Derrick Luckassen	(yellow card) 23'
CB	28	(France) Olivier Boscagli
LB	32	(Czech Republic) Michal Sadílek
CM	18	(Netherlands) Pablo Rosario (c)
CM	8	(Netherlands) Jorrit Hendrix	(yellow card) 21'	(substituted off) 46'
RW	7	(Portugal) Bruma		(substituted off) 46'
AM	10	(Netherlands) Steven Bergwijn		(substituted off) 59'
LW	19	(Netherlands) Cody Gakpo	(yellow card) 45+1'
CF	14	(Netherlands) Sam Lammers
Substitutes:
GK	21	(Netherlands) Robbin Ruiter
DF	4	(Netherlands) Nick Viergever
DF	20	(Australia) Trent Sainsbury
DF	33	(Netherlands) Jordan Teze
MF	15	(Mexico) Érick Gutiérrez		(substituted in) 46'
MF	17	(Netherlands) Ibrahim Afellay
MF	24	(Netherlands) Mohammed Ihattaren
MF	25	(Netherlands) Bart Ramselaar
FW	9	(Netherlands) Donyell Malen		(substituted in) 46'
FW	11	(Mexico) Hirving Lozano		(substituted in) 59'
FW	16	(Netherlands) Joël Piroe
FW	26	(Netherlands) Zakaria Aboukhlal
Manager:
(Netherlands) Mark van Bommel

== See also ==
- 2018–19 Eredivisie
- 2018–19 KNVB Cup
- AFC Ajax–PSV Eindhoven rivalry
