= Nick Hak =

Dutch footballer (born 1997)

Personal information
- Date of birth: 13 May 1997 (age 29)
- Place of birth: Maurik, Netherlands
- Height: 1.80 m (5 ft 11 in)
- Position: Forward

Team information
- Current team: DOVO
- Number: 11

Youth career
- SV MEC '07
- Utrecht

Senior career*
Years	Team	Apps	(Gls)
2016–2017	Dordrecht	12	(0)
2017–2018	Lienden	34	(5)
2019–2020	TEC	37	(8)
2020–2021	Hercules	5	(2)
2021–	DOVO	124	(39)
- * Club domestic league appearances and goals as of 11 January 2026

Nick Hak (born 13 May 1997) is a Dutch footballer who plays as a forward for DOVO.

== Club career ==
He made his professional debut in the Eerste Divisie for FC Dordrecht on 21 October 2016 in a game against Almere City FC.

Hak joined SV TEC in January 2019. In winter 2020-21, Hak joined DOVO from fellow amateur side Hercules.
