= HVV Te Werve =

Dutch football club

Te Werve
- Full name: Haagse Voetbalvereniging Te Werve
- Founded: 1916
- Stadium: Sportpark Vredenburch
- League: Tweede Klasse West-II (Saturday)
- 2019–20: Tweede Klasse: Cancelled
- Website: http://www.hvvtewerve.nl/
Home colours

Haagse Voetbalvereniging Te Werve is a football club based in the Te Werve neighbourhood of Rijswijk, Netherlands. The club plays in the Tweede Klasse, the seventh tier of Dutch football.

== History ==
HVV Te Werve was founded on 1 September 1916 as a club owned by Shell. The club's name is derived from Landgoed te Werve, an estate in Rijswijk. After having played football in The Hague for many years, the club's board made the decision to return to Rijswijk in 2014. Since then, matches have been held at Sportpark Vredenburch in the Te Werve neighbourhood of the town.

In the 2018–19 KNVB Cup, HVV Te Werve reached the first round of the main tournament before losing 7–0 to national champions Ajax.

== Honours ==
HVV Te Werve honours
Honour	No.	Years
Tweede Klasse	1	2016–17
Derde Klasse	1	2015–16
Vijfde Klasse	1	2000–01
