= Jaap Burger =

Dutch politician (1904–1986)

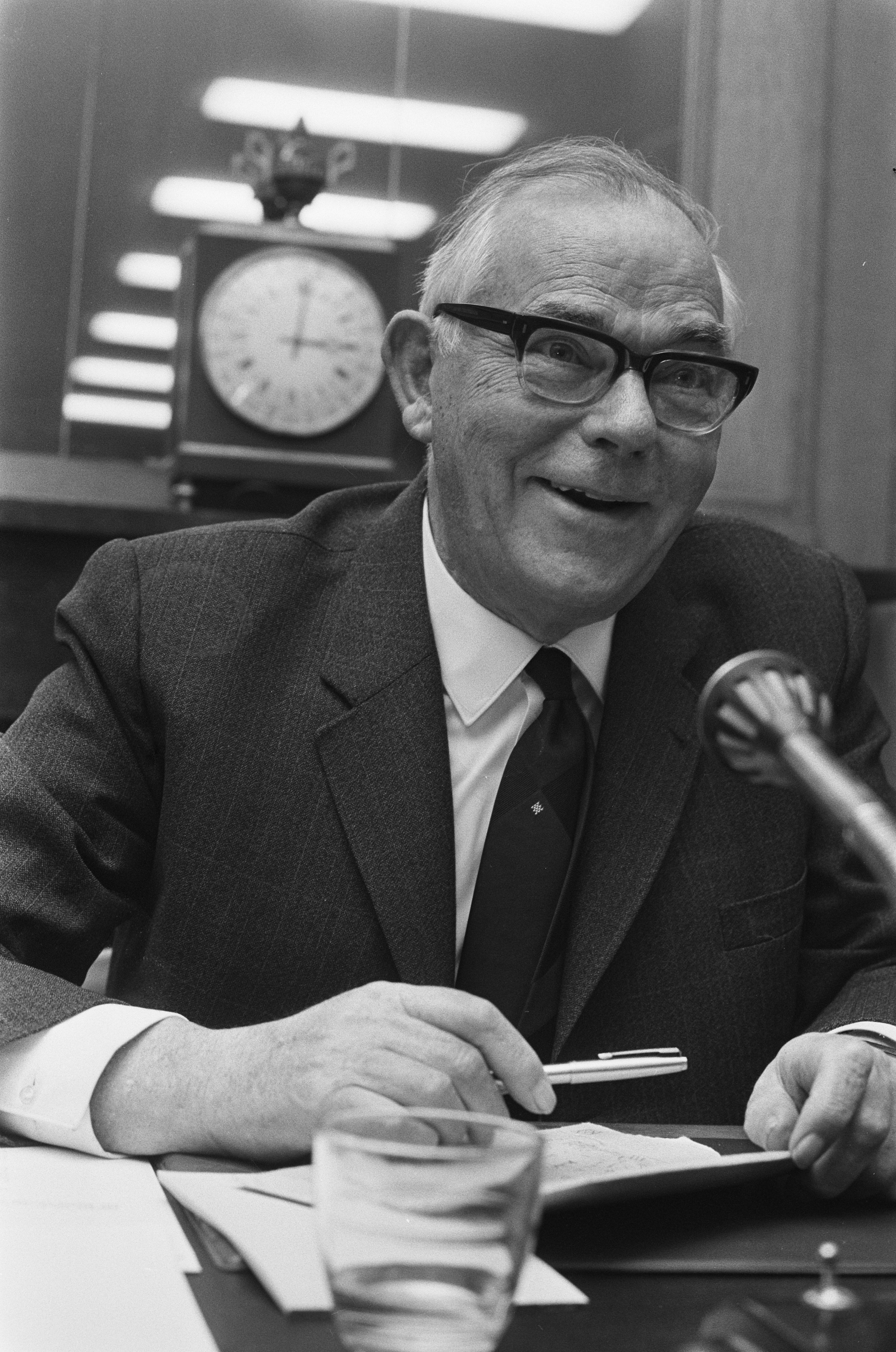
- Burger in 1973

Member of the Council of State
- In office 1 October 1970 – 1 September 1979
- Vice President: Louis Beel (1970–1972); Marinus Ruppert (1973–1979)

Delegation leader in the European Parliament
- In office 7 May 1967 – 29 September 1970
- Preceded by: Marinus van der Goes van Naters
- Succeeded by: Ad Oele

Member of the European Parliament
- In office 20 October 1966 – 29 September 1970
- Parliamentary group: Socialist Group
- Constituency: Netherlands

Member of the Senate
- In office 5 June 1963 – 1 October 1970

Leader of the Labour Party
- In office 22 December 1958 – 16 September 1962
- Deputy: Anne Vondeling (1959–1962)
- Preceded by: Willem Drees
- Succeeded by: Anne Vondeling

President of the Benelux Parliament
- In office 1 January 1958 – 1 January 1959
- Preceded by: Frans Van Cauwelaert
- Succeeded by: Camille Linden

Parliamentary leader in the House of Representatives
- In office 2 September 1952 – 16 September 1962
- Preceded by: Leen Donker
- Succeeded by: Anne Vondeling
- In office 16 January 1951 – 18 September 1951
- Preceded by: Marinus van der Goes van Naters
- Succeeded by: Leen Donker

Member of the House of Representatives
- In office 20 November 1945 – 16 September 1962

Minister of the Interior
- In office 31 May 1944 – 27 January 1945
- Prime Minister: Pieter Sjoerds Gerbrandy
- Preceded by: Hendrik van Boeijen
- Succeeded by: Hendrik van Boeijen (ad interim)

Minister for Return Policy
- In office 11 August 1943 – 31 May 1944
- Prime Minister: Pieter Sjoerds Gerbrandy
- Preceded by: Office established
- Succeeded by: Office discontinued

Personal details
- Born: Jacobus Albertus Wilhelmus Burger; 20 August 1904 Willemstad, Netherlands
- Died: 19 August 1986 (aged 81) Wassenaar, Netherlands
- Party: Labour Party (from 1946)
- Other political affiliations: Social Democratic Workers' Party (1929–1946)
- Spouse: Emma Petronella Visser (m. 1947)
- Education: University of Amsterdam (Bachelor of Laws, Master of Laws)
- Occupation: Politician · Civil servant · Jurist · Lawyer · Nonprofit director · Media administrator · Lobbyist

Jacobus Albertus Wilhelmus "Jaap" Burger (20 August 1904 – 19 August 1986) was a Dutch politician of the Social Democratic Workers' Party (SDAP) and later co-founder of the Labour Party (PvdA) and jurist. He was granted the honorary title of Minister of State on 4 January 1975.

== Early life and education ==
Burger attended a gymnasium in Rotterdam from April 1917 until May 1923 and applied at the University of Amsterdam in July 1923 majoring in Law and obtaining a Bachelor of Laws degree in June 1925 before graduating with a Master of Laws degree in July 1929. Burger worked as a lawyer in Dordrecht from October 1929 until December 1942. On 10 May 1940 Nazi Germany invaded the Netherlands and the government fled to London to escape the German occupation. Burger joined the Dutch resistance against the German occupiers in August 1942. In January 1943 Burger escaped the German occupation to England. Burger worked as political advisor for Minister of Social Affairs Jan van den Tempel from February 1943 until August 1943.

== Political career ==
Burger was appointed as Minister for Return Policy in the Gerbrandy II cabinet by Queen Wilhelmina, taking office on 11 August 1943. Burger was appointed as Minister of the Interior following the resignation of Hendrik van Boeijen, taking office on 31 May 1944. On 27 January 1945 Burger was forced to resign by Prime Minister Pieter Sjoerds Gerbrandy following an impromptu remark during a radio address where he differentiated between "wrongful" Dutch civilians (foute Nederlanders) and Dutch civilians who made a mistake (Nederlanders die een fout hebben gemaakt) during the War, but because Gerbrandy did not discuss this with rest of the cabinet all Social Democratic Workers' Party cabinet members resigned in response and the cabinet continued to serve in a demissionary capacity.

Following the end of World War II Queen Wilhelmina ordered a Recall of Parliament and Burger was appointment to the House of Representatives taking the place of the deceased Theo van der Waerden, taking office on 20 November 1945 serving as a frontbencher and spokesperson for the Interior and the de facto Whip. On 9 February 1946 the Social Democratic Workers' Party (SDAP), the Free-thinking Democratic League (VDB) and the Christian Democratic Union (CDU) chose to merge in a political alliance to form the Labour Party (PvdA), with Burger as one of the co-founders. Burger also became active in the public sector and worked as media administrator for the public broadcaster VARA serving as chairman of the supervisory board from 12 February 1949 until 20 December 1966. After the parliamentary leader of the Labour Party in the House of Representatives Marinus van der Goes van Naters announced he was stepping down following a conflict with Prime Minister and Leader of the Labour Party Willem Drees, the party leadership approached Leen Donker as his successor but the day before he took office parliamentary leader-designate Donker took a leave of absence for health reasons and the party leadership approached Burger as interim parliamentary leader, serving from 16 January 1951 until 18 September 1951. After the 1952 general election, Donker was appointed as Minister of Justice in the Drees II cabinet and the Labour Party leadership approached Burger as parliamentary leader, taking office on 2 September 1952. Burger also served as president of the Benelux Parliament from 1 January 1958 until 1 January 1959.

On 11 December 1958 the Drees III cabinet fell and incumbent Prime Minister and Leader of the Labour Party Drees announced his retirement from national politics and stated that he would not stand for the 1959 general election, the Labour Party leadership approached Burger as his successor, Burger accepted and became the Leader and one of the lead candidates, taking office on 22 December 1958. The Labour Party suffered a small loss, losing 2 seats and fell back as the second largest party and now had 48 seats in the House of Representatives. On 16 September 1962 Burger announced that he was stepping down as party leader and parliamentary leader following increasing criticism on his leadership. Burger remained in active in national politics, he was elected to the Senate after the 1963 Senate election, taking office on 5 June 1963 serving as a frontbencher and spokesperson for defence and deputy spokesperson for foreign affairs, European affairs and NATO. Burger was selected as a Member of the European Parliament and dual served in those positions, taking office on 20 October 1966. After the delegation leader of the Labour Party in the European Parliament Marinus van der Goes van Naters resigned, Burger was appointed as delegation leader, taking office on 7 May 1967. Burger was nominated as a Member of the Council of State, serving from 1 October 1970 until 1 September 1979. After his retirement Burger occupied numerous seats as a nonprofit director for supervisory boards for several international non-governmental organizations and research institutes (International Institute of Social History, Transnational Institute, Royal Netherlands Historical Society, Netherlands Atlantic Association and the Rijksmuseum) and as an advocate and lobbyist for European integration, Benelux cooperation and serving on several commissions for the European Economic Community and state commissions on behalf of the Dutch government.

== Decorations ==
Military decorations
Ribbon bar	Decoration	Country	Date	Comment
	Bronze Cross	Netherlands	26 July 1943	
	Resistance Memorial Cross	Netherlands	30 April 1982	

Honours
Ribbon bar	Honour	Country	Date	Comment
	Grand Officer of the Order of the House of Orange	Netherlands	19 August 1944	
	Grand Cross of the Order of the Crown	Belgium	4 September 1954	
	Grand Officer of the Legion of Honour	France	1 May 1958	
	Commander of the Order of the Netherlands Lion	Netherlands	16 September 1962	Elevated from Knight (31 August 1946)
	Grand Officer of the Order of Orange-Nassau	Netherlands	1 September 1979	Elevated from Commander (4 January 1975)

Honorific titles
Ribbon bar	Honour	Country	Date	Comment
	Minister of State	Netherlands	4 January 1975	Style of Excellency

Party political offices
Preceded by Marinus van der Goes van Naters	Parliamentary leader of the Labour Party in the House of Representatives; 1951	Succeeded by Leen Donker
Preceded by Leen Donker	Parliamentary leader of the Labour Party in the House of Representatives; 1952–1962	Succeeded by Anne Vondeling
Preceded by Willem Drees	Leader of the Labour Party; 1958–1962	Succeeded by Anne Vondeling
Political offices
New office	Minister for Return Policy; 1943–1944	Office discontinued
Preceded by Hendrik van Boeijen	Minister of the Interior; 1944–1945	Succeeded by Hendrik van Boeijen; Ad interim
Media offices
Preceded by Klaas de Jonge; Ad interim	Chairman of the Supervisory board of the VARA; 1949–1966	Succeeded by Jan Broeksz
