= Mats van Kins =

Dutch footballer (born 1998)

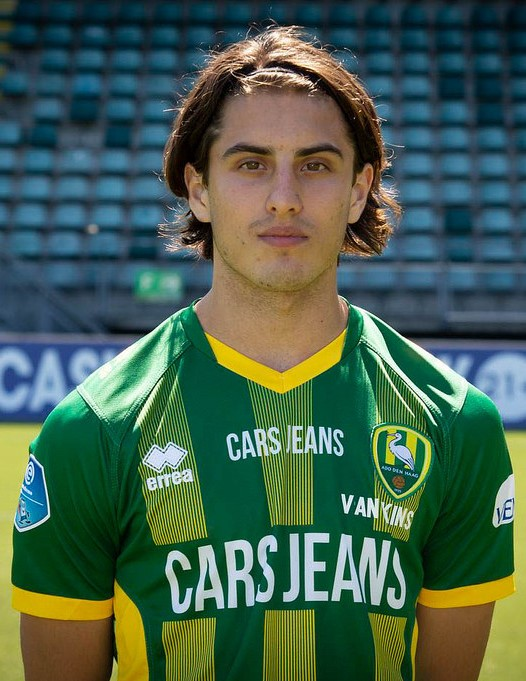
- Mats van Kins in 2018

Personal information
- Date of birth: 17 December 1998 (age 27)
- Place of birth: Leiderdorp, Netherlands
- Height: 1.82 m (6 ft 0 in)
- Position: Midfielder

Youth career
- 2005–2010: RKVV Meerburg
- 2010–2012: UVS Leiden
- 2012–2015: RKVV Meerburg
- 2015–2017: RCL Leiderdorp

Senior career*
Years	Team	Apps	(Gls)
2017–2020	ADO Den Haag	1	(0)
2020–2021	Noordwijk	5	(0)
- * Club domestic league appearances and goals as of 13:40, 6 June 2021 (UTC)

Mats van Kins (born 17 December 1998) is a Dutch professional footballer who plays as a midfielder.

== Professional career ==
Van Kins joined ADO Den Haag in the summer of 2017 from amateur team RCL in Leiderdorp as an attacking midfielder for the second team, and on 27 October 2017 signed his first professional contract for 3+1 years. Van Kins made his professional debut for ADO Den Haag in the 88th minute of a 4–0 Eredivisie win over PEC Zwolle on 22 December 2017.

In February 2020 it was confirmed, that van Kins would move to VV Noordwijk from the upcoming season.
