= Hendrik van Boeijen =

Dutch politician (1889–1947)

His Excellency Hendrik van Boeijen
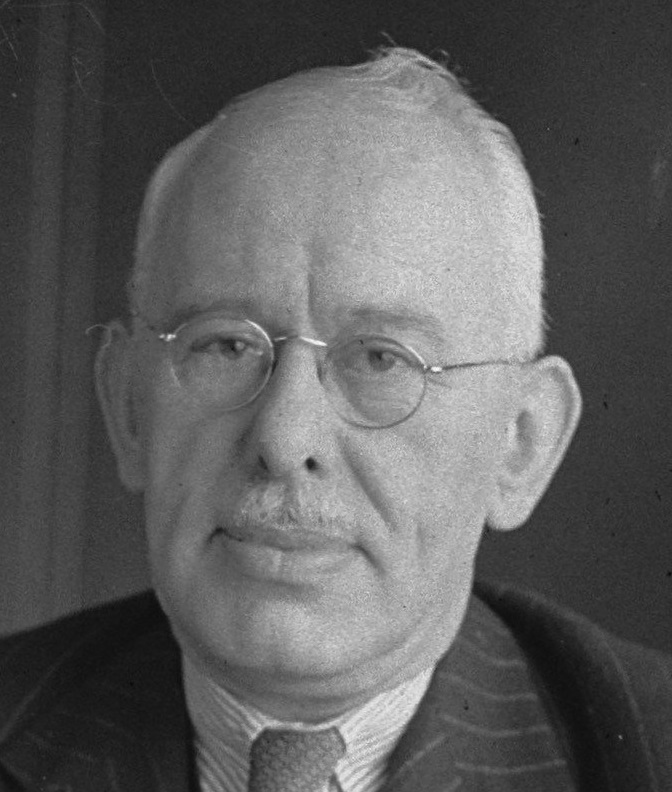
- Van Boeijen in 1942

Minister of War
- In office 27 July 1941 – 15 September 1942
- Prime Minister: Pieter Sjoerds Gerbrandy
- Preceded by: Himself as Minister of Defence
- Succeeded by: Otto van Lidth de Jeude

Minister of Defence
- In office 12 June 1941 – 27 July 1941; Ad interim
- Prime Minister: Pieter Sjoerds Gerbrandy
- Preceded by: Adriaan Dijxhoorn
- Succeeded by: Himself as Minister of War; Johan Furstner as Minister of the Navy

Minister of General Affairs
- In office 3 September 1940 – 23 February 1945 Serving with Pieter Sjoerds Gerbrandy as Minister of General Warfare (1942–1945)
- Prime Minister: Pieter Sjoerds Gerbrandy
- Preceded by: Dirk Jan de Geer
- Succeeded by: Louis Beel (1947)

Minister of the Interior
- In office 27 January 1945 – 23 February 1945; Ad interim
- Prime Minister: Pieter Sjoerds Gerbrandy
- Preceded by: Jaap Burger
- Succeeded by: Louis Beel
- In office 24 June 1937 – 31 May 1944
- Prime Minister: See list: Hendrikus Colijn (1937–1939) Dirk Jan de Geer (1939–1940) Pieter Sjoerds Gerbrandy (1940–1944)
- Preceded by: Jacob Adriaan de Wilde
- Succeeded by: Jaap Burger

Personal details
- Born: Hendrik van Boeijen; 23 May 1889 Putten, Netherlands
- Died: 30 March 1947 (aged 57) Soesterberg, Netherlands
- Party: Christian Historical Union
- Spouse: Petronella de Mots (m. 1916)
- Children: Geertje van Boeijen (1918–1993); Gerarda van Boeijen (1921–2000); Jaap van Boeijen (1931–1995); 1 other child
- Occupation: Politician · Civil servant · Nonprofit director · Media administrator

Hendrik van Boeijen (23 May 1889 – 30 March 1947) was a Dutch politician of the Christian Historical Union (CHU).

== Decorations ==
Honours
Ribbon bar	Honour	Country	Date	Comment
	Knight of the Order of the Netherlands Lion	Netherlands	1935	
	Grand Officer of the Order of Orange-Nassau	Netherlands	6 May 1946	

Political offices
Preceded by Jacob Adriaan de Wilde	Minister of the Interior; 1937–1944	Succeeded by Jaap Burger
Preceded by Dirk Jan de Geer	Minister of General Affairs; 1940–1945	Vacant Title next held by Louis Beel
Preceded by Adriaan Dijxhoorn	Minister of Defence; Ad interim 1941	Succeeded by Johan Furstner as Minister of the Navy
Preceded by Adriaan Dijxhoorn	Minister of Defence; Ad interim 1941	Succeeded by Himself as Minister of War
Preceded by Himself as Minister of Defence	Minister of War; 1941–1942	Succeeded by Otto van Lidth de Jeude
Preceded by Jaap Burger	Minister of the Interior; Ad interim 1945	Succeeded by Louis Beel
