= BMGN: Low Countries Historical Review =

- Discipline: History of the Low Countries
- Language: Dutch, English
- Edited by: Dirk Jan Wolffram

Publication details
- Former names: Bijdragen en Mededeelingen van het Historisch Genootschap; Bijdragen voor de Geschiedenis der Nederlanden; Bijdragen en Mededelingen betreffende de Geschiedenis der Nederlanden
- History: 1877–present
- Publisher: Royal Netherlands Historical Society (Netherlands)
- Frequency: Quarterly
- Open access: Yes
- License: CC-BY-NC 4.0
- Impact factor: 0.489 (2017)

Standard abbreviations
- ISO 4: BMGN: Low Ctries. Hist. Rev.
- NLM: Bijdr Meded Geschied Ned

Indexing
- ISSN: 0165-0505 (print); 2211-2898 (web)
- LCCN: 92648594
- OCLC no.: 984364362

Links
- Journal homepage; Online access; Online archive

BMGN: Low Countries Historical Review is a peer-reviewed open-access academic journal covering the history of the Low Countries, which is taken to include the Netherlands and Belgium and their colonial and international involvements. It is published by the Royal Netherlands Historical Society (Koninklijk Nederlands Historisch Genootschap), with articles appearing either in Dutch or in English. In June 2018 it was announced that Dirk Jan Wolffram (University of Groningen) would be taking over as chair of the editorial board.

The journal was established in 1877 as the Bijdragen en Mededeelingen van het Historisch Genootschap ("Contributions and Communications of the Historical Society"). In 1969 it absorbed the Bijdragen voor de Geschiedenis der Nederlanden (established in 1946), becoming Bijdragen en Mededelingen betreffende de Geschiedenis der Nederlanden ("Contributions and Communications concerning the History of the Low Countries"), abbreviated BMGN. The journal obtained its current title in 2012, when it became an open-access online publication.

== Abstracting and indexing ==
The journal is abstracted and indexed in:

- Arts & Humanities Citation Index
- Current Contents/Arts & Humanities
- Current Contents/Social & Behavioral Sciences
- Scopus
- Social Sciences Citation Index

According to the Journal Citation Reports, the journal has a 2016 impact factor of 0.506.
