= Tjarda Struik =

Dutch politician and influencer (born 1986)

Mayor of Leiderdorp
- Incumbent
- Assumed office 14 November 2023

Municipal councilor of Zeist
- In office 2018–2023

Personal details
- Born: Tjarda C.M. Struik; 17 April 1986 (age 40) Putten, Netherlands
- Party: VVD
- Education: University of Groningen
- Profession: Politician; influencer
- Website: tjardastruik.nl

Tjarda C.M. Struik (born 17 April 1986) is a Dutch politician and civil servant representing the People's Party for Freedom and Democracy (VVD). Since 14 November 2023, Struik has been mayor of Leiderdorp.

== Early life and education ==
Struik was born in Putten on the Veluwe, where she grew up with her sister and two half-sisters. When she was in primary school, her teachers and parents suspected that she could not see well. Examination revealed the eye disease macular degeneration, a progressive disease. Due to this eye condition, Struik has approximately five percent vision.

Struik received no special treatment and did not go to special education. She obtained a bachelor's and master's degree in psychology in Groningen between 2005 and 2012.

After her studies, Struik moved to Amsterdam, where she noticed that she could not cope well with her disability. During a nine-month stay in a rehabilitation center, she learned Braille and learned to use a cane.

== Career ==
Struik started her career as a communications advisor at the rehabilitation center where she stayed. She then worked as a manager in disability care. After a conversation with former Speaker of the House Gerdi Verbeet, she decided to enter politics herself.

From 29 March 2018 to 3 October 2023, Struik was a municipal councilor in Zeist. On 13 June 2023, she was nominated as the new mayor by the Leiderdorp municipal council. On 14 November of that year, Struik was sworn in as mayor by King's Commissioner Jaap Smit. This made her the first female (almost) blind mayor of the Netherlands. In preparation, she followed an orientation program from the Ministry of the Interior.

In 2021, she started a speakers and consultancy firm, through which she gives lectures on inclusivity and diversity. She has been active on TikTok as a blindfluencer since 2022, with around two hundred thousand followers as of mid-2023.

== Personal life ==
She is married and the mother of two children. Her father was director of the Struik canning factory.

Party political offices
Preceded by Laila Driessen-Jansen	Mayor of Leiderdorp; 2023–present	Incumbent
