= Putten =

- Town and municipality
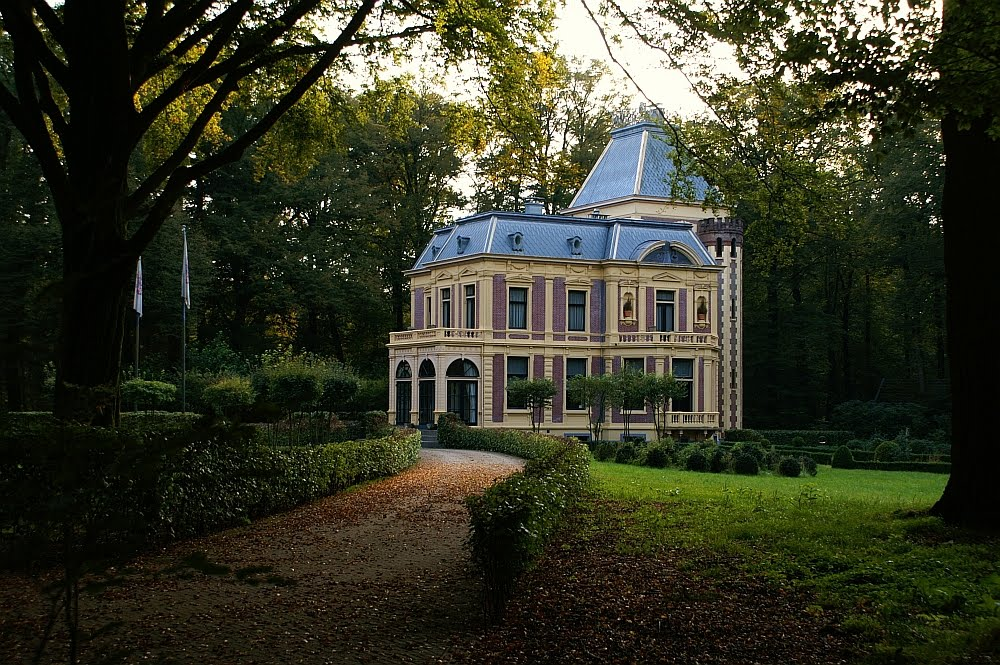
- Groot Spriel

- Flag Coat of arms

- Location in Gelderland
- Coordinates: 52°16′N 5°36′E
- Country: Netherlands
- Province: Gelderland

Government
  - Body: Municipal council
  - Mayor: Henk Lambooij (SGP)

Area
  - Total: 87.50 km^{2} (33.78 sq mi)
  - Land: 85.22 km^{2} (32.90 sq mi)
  - Water: 2.28 km^{2} (0.88 sq mi)
- Elevation: 17 m (56 ft)

Population (January 2021)
  - Total: 24,365
  - Density: 286/km^{2} (740/sq mi)
- Demonym: Puttenaar
- Time zone: UTC+1 (CET)
  - Summer (DST): UTC+2 (CEST)
- Postcode: 3880–3882
- Area code: 0341
- Website: www.putten.nl

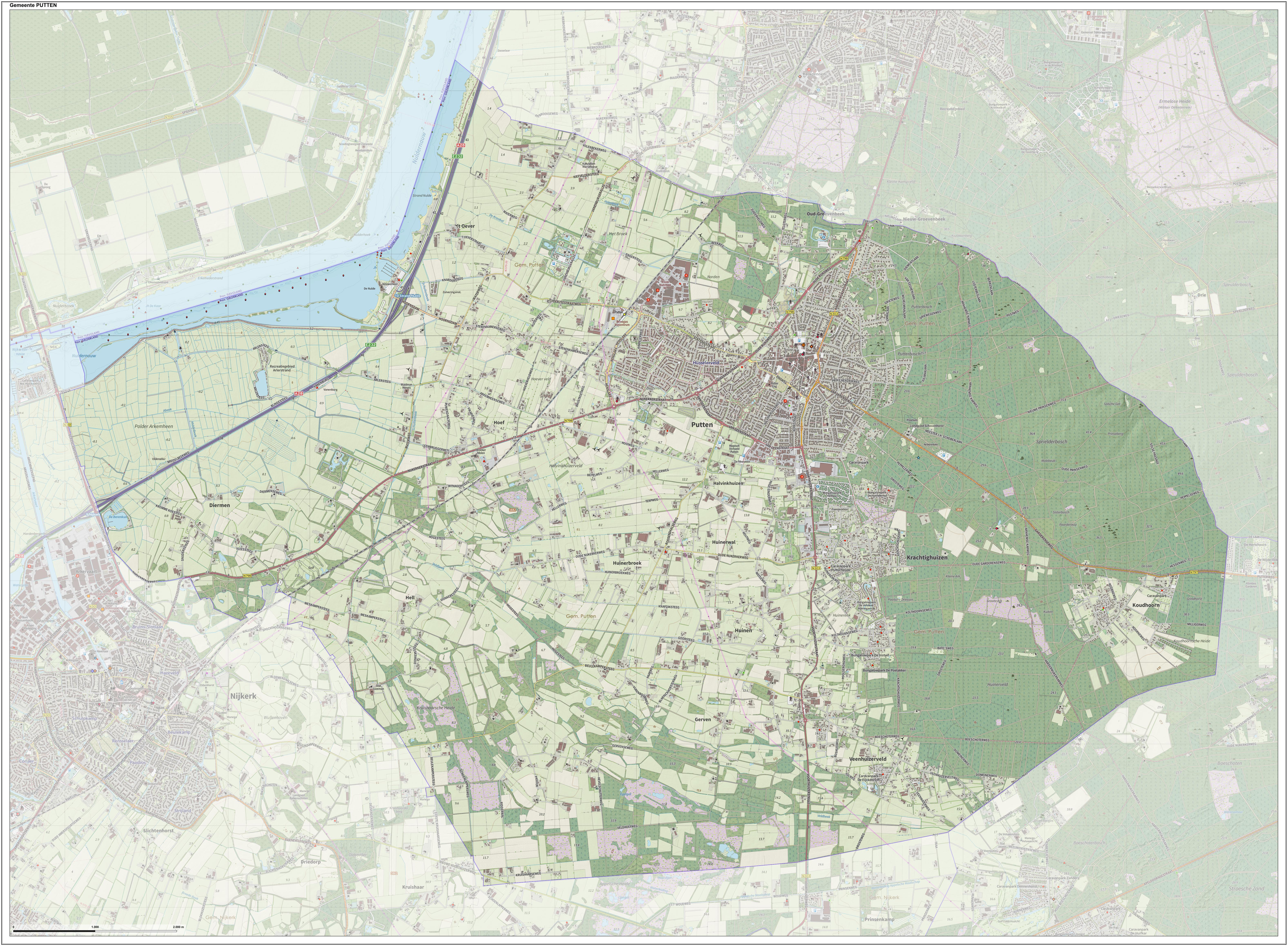
Dutch Topographic map of the municipality of Putten, June 2015

Putten (Dutch pronunciation: [ˈpʏtə(n)]) is a municipality and town in the province of Gelderland, Netherlands. It had a population of 24,365 in 2021. It is located in the coastal area of the old Zuiderzee (Southern Sea). To the east of Putten lies the Veluwe, the biggest national park of the Netherlands. To the north, east and west, Putten is surrounded by farmlands. Putten is the location of the centre of gravity of the Netherlands.

== Population centres ==
- Bijsteren
- Diermen
- Gerven
- Halvinkhuizen
- Hell
- Hoef
- Huinen
- Koudhoorn
- Krachtighuizen
- Putten
- Steenenkamer
- Veenhuizerveld.

== History ==
=== Until World War II ===
The oldest official paper in which Putten is mentioned dates back to 855. Small settlements, however, were already in existence during the Roman era. After the founding of the present main church in the 10th century, the community became the center of several smaller settlements. Parts of Nijkerk and Voorthuizen also became part of the Putten area, until in 1530 Nijkerk, and later also Voorthuizen, became independent communities.

Until 1356, when a dyke was built, the coastline changed frequently, overflowing agricultural land in the west of Putten. The water was still a threat however, and the dyke broke through several times. The last major flood was in 1916, when large parts of Putten were flooded. After the Afsluitdijk was built in the north of the Netherlands, the Zuiderzee became a lake (1927–1933) and no longer posed a threat.

Agriculture has always been a major source of income in Putten. The manufacturing of paper was also important in the 17th to 19th centuries. From the end of the 19th century tourism emerged, helped by the arrival of the railway in 1863. This made it easier for people from other towns to holiday in the boarding houses that Putten had built. Among those people from elsewhere were also patients who suffered from tuberculosis and similar diseases. They benefited from the sunlight and clean air and recuperated in several sanatoria.

Putten has suffered considerably from military violence. During the 15th, 16th and 17th century Putten was burned down on at least five occasions.

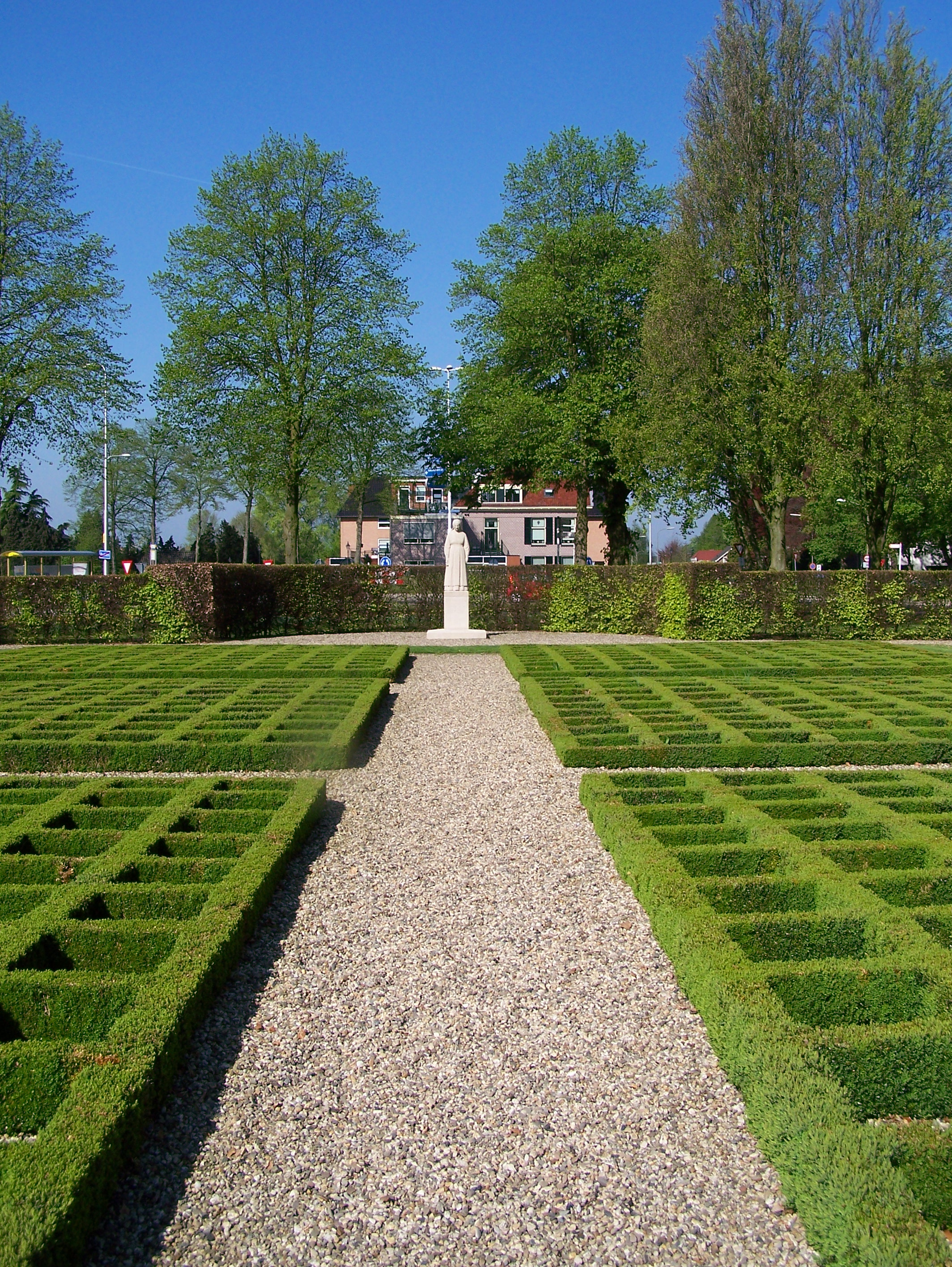
Vrouwtje van Putten Herdenkingshof (Lady of Putten Memorial Garden).

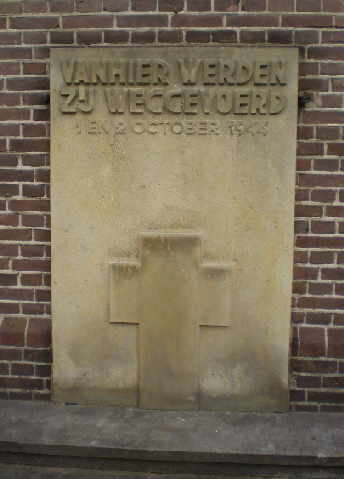
War memorial at the church of Putten.

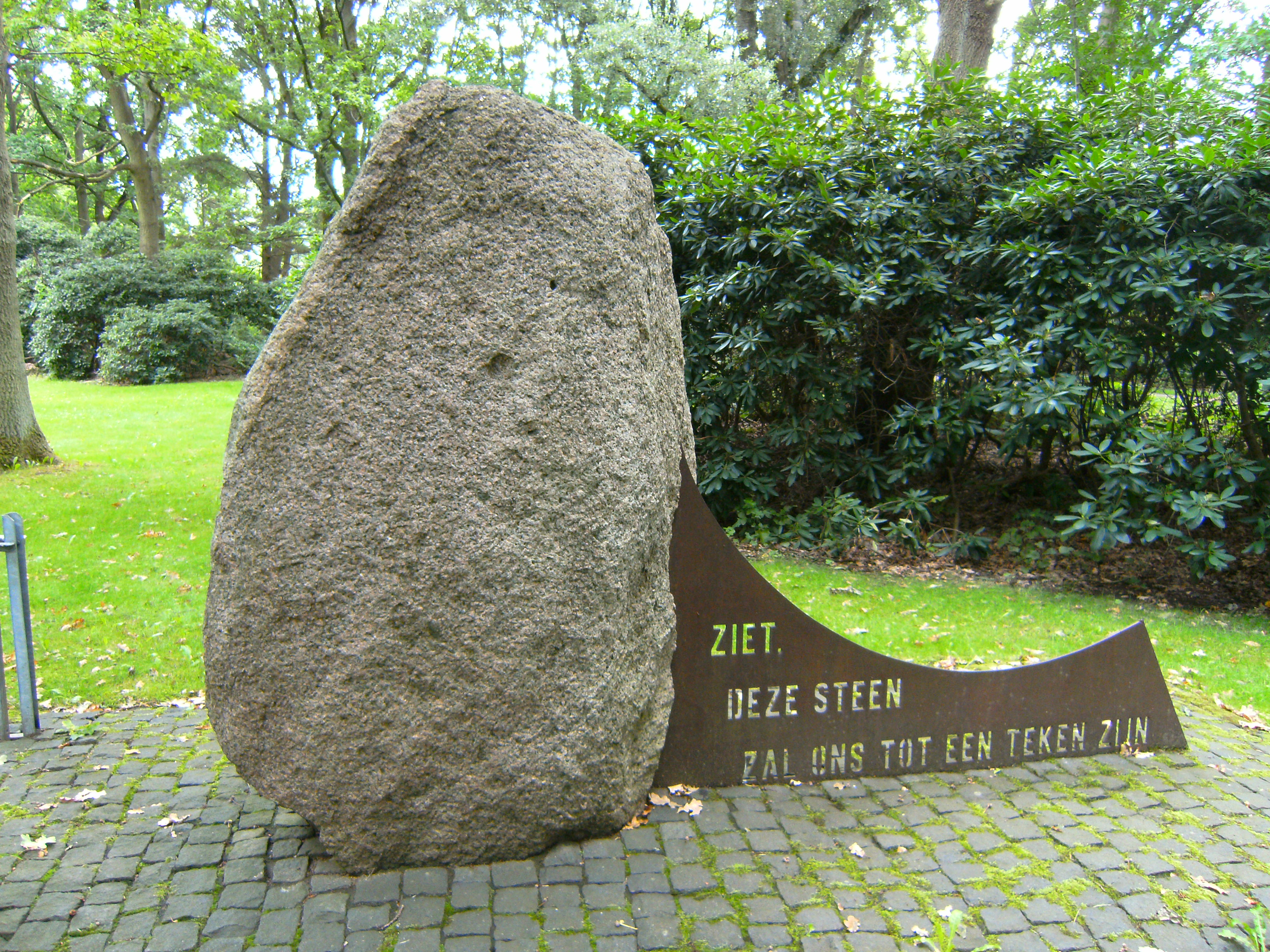
Hamburg, Memorial of Neuengamme concentration camp: memorial area, memorial stone on Putten. In memory of the victims of the deportation 1944.

=== World War II ===
One of the biggest Nazi raids held in the Netherlands during World War II took place in Putten. On 1 and 2 October 1944, the majority of the male population was deported from the town and most of them died in concentration camps such as Neuengamme and Birkenau. Following the war, two of the responsible German officers were tried and convicted for this action. The raids were a retaliation for an attack by the local resistance that killed one Wehrmacht officer near Nijkerk. The first and second of October are commemorated every year in Putten. A war memorial at Putten Church and a memorial garden (Vrouwtje van Putten Herdenkingshof) commemorate the event and the loss of life.

Total number of men deported	661
Released in Amersfoort	59
Deported to Neuengamme	602
Jumped out of the train on the way to Neuengamme	13
Arrived in Neuengamme	589
Returned to Putten after liberation	49
Died in German concentration camps	540
Killed during the raid	7
Died shortly after the return	5
Total number of deaths	552

== Economy ==
Today agriculture is still important in Putten, but the service sector now predominates. There are considerable numbers of shops, and tourism is important. Tourists are attracted by the varied landscape and the beach at the Ring Lake (Strand Nulde). Every Wednesday there is a produce and food market that is the biggest in the northwest Veluwe area.

== Transport ==
Putten lies next to the A28 highway that connects Utrecht with the north. The town has a train station on the line between Utrecht and Zwolle. There are also bus connections.

== Notable people ==
- Hendrik van Boeijen (1889–1947), politician
- Danielle Goldstein (born 1985), American-Israeli show jumper, lives in Putten
- Ummet Ozcan (born 1982), Dutch–Turkish DJ and record producer
- Sander Duits (born 1983), footballer with about 400 club caps who plays for SDC Putten
- Tjarda Struik (born 1986), politician and blindfluencer

== Gallery ==
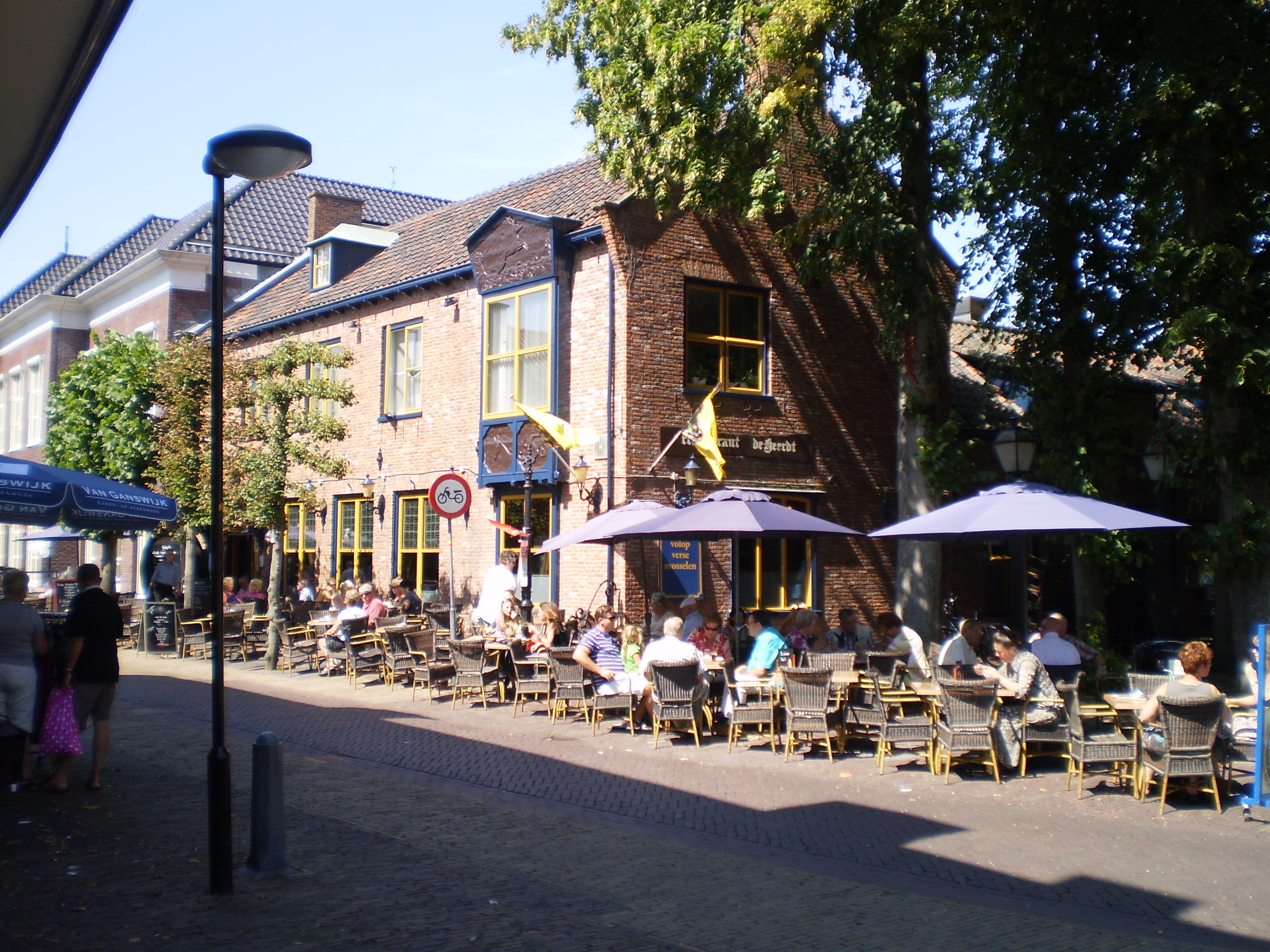
Buorren Putten by de tsjerke

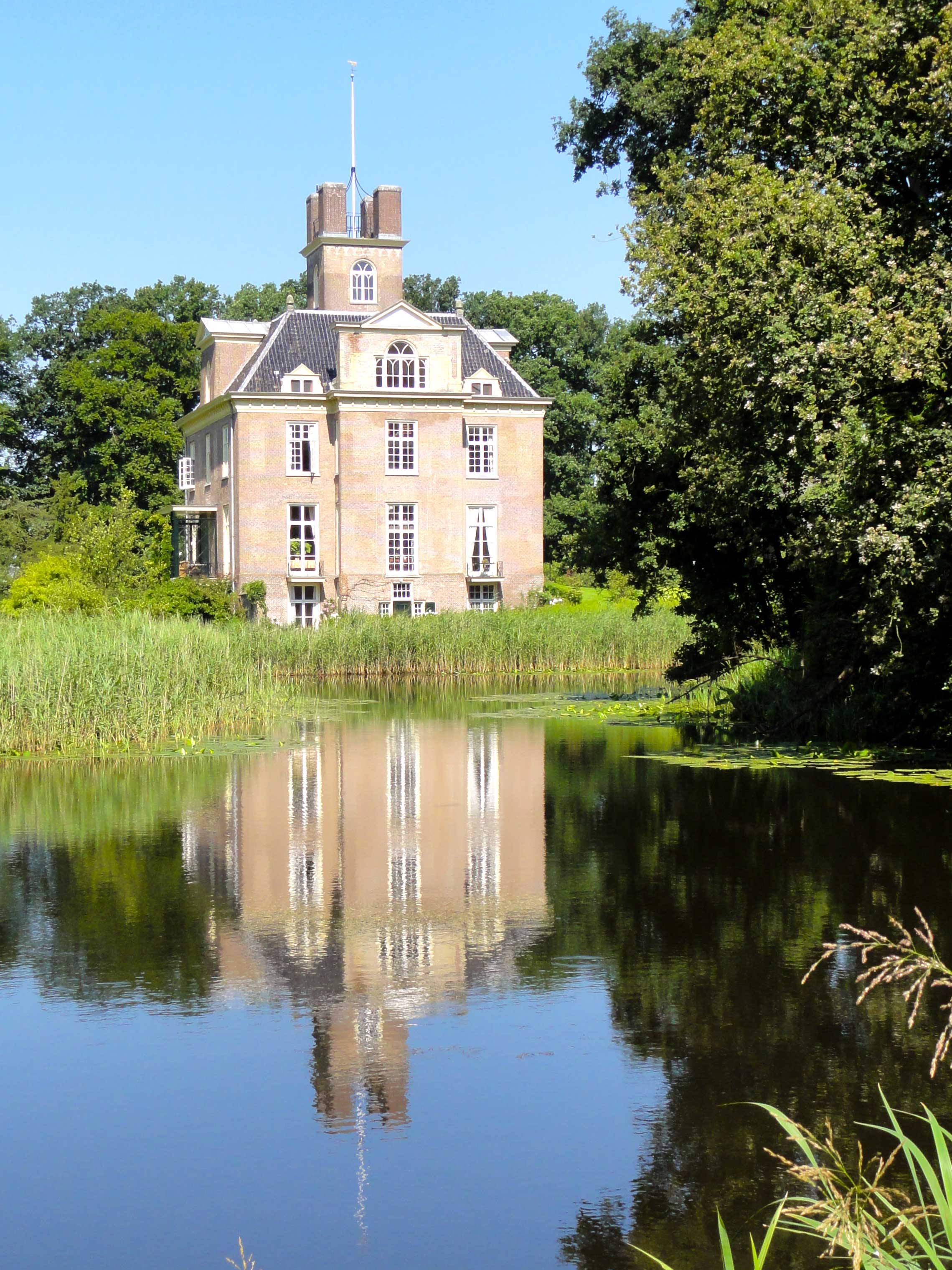
Kasteel Oldenaller

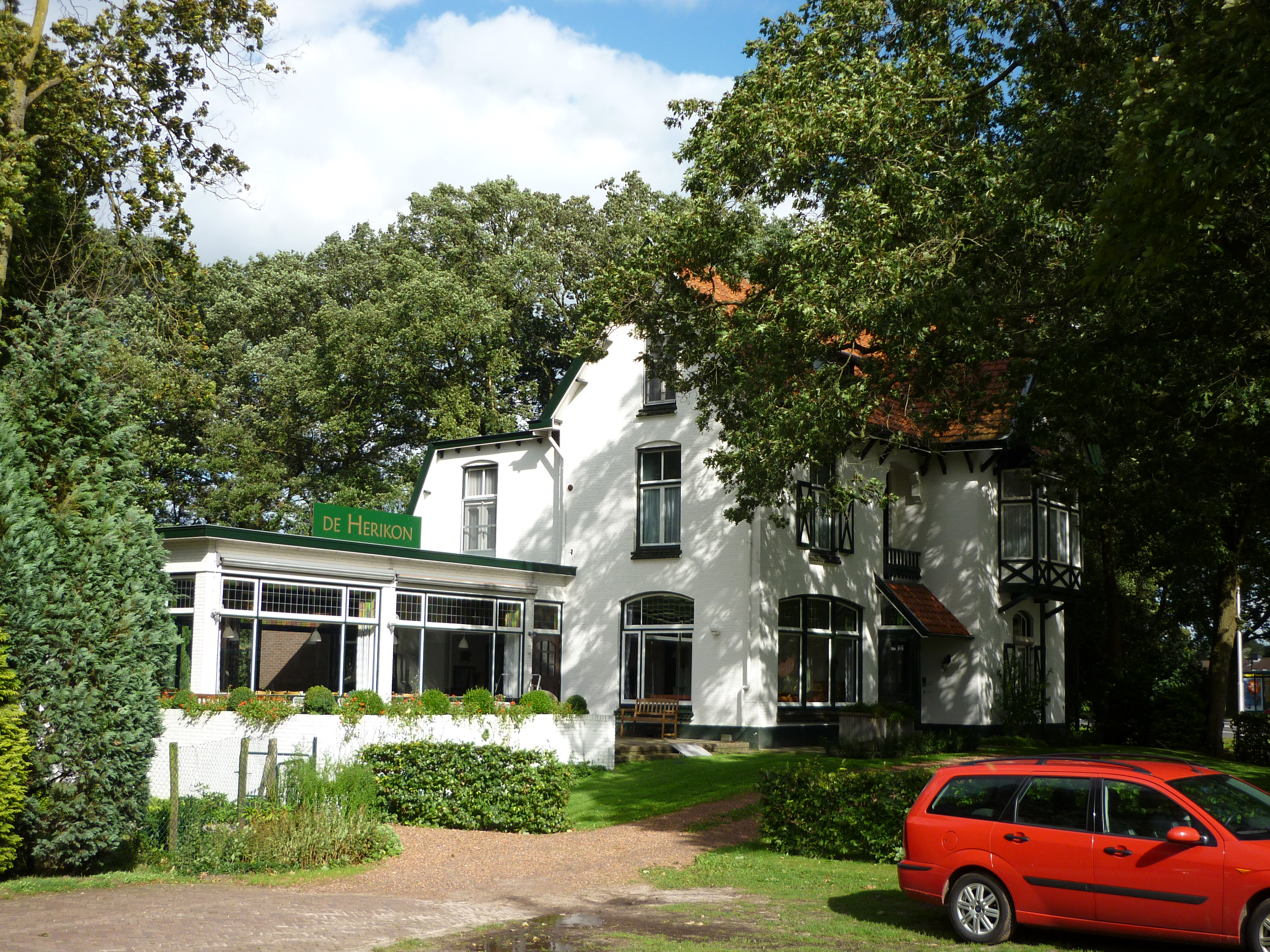
de Herikon, Putten

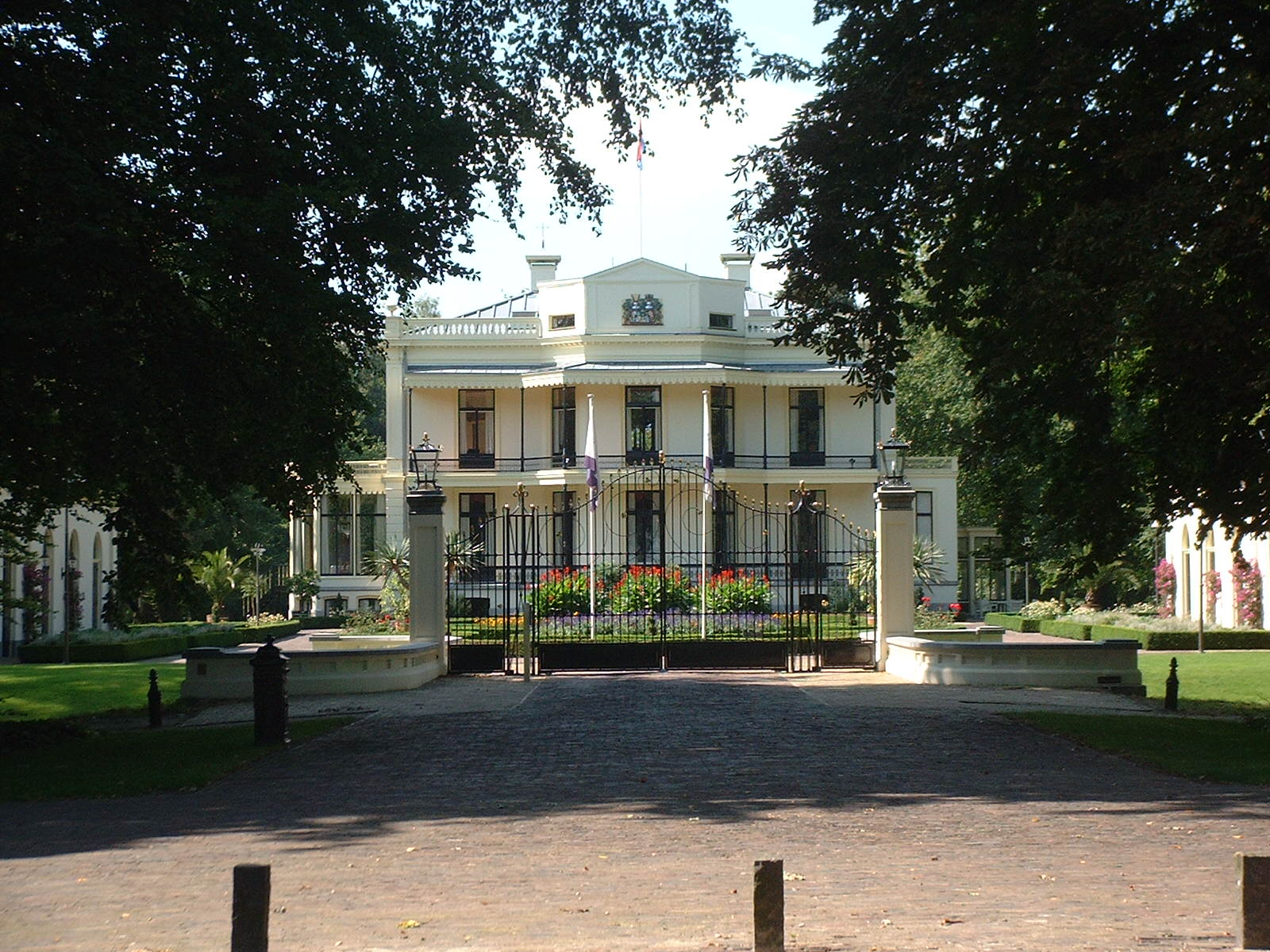
Kasteel de Vanenburg
