= Leen Donker =

Dutch politician (1899–1956)

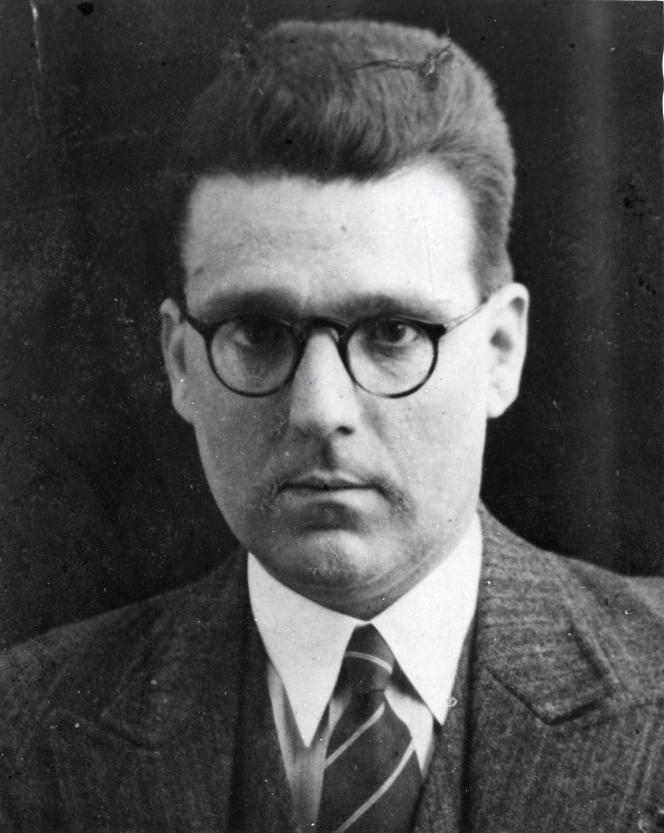
- Donker in 1948

Minister of Justice
- In office 2 September 1952 – 4 February 1956
- Prime Minister: Willem Drees
- Preceded by: Hendrik Mulderije
- Succeeded by: Louis Beel (Ad interim)

Parliamentary leader of the Labour Party in the House of Representatives
- In office 18 September 1951 – 2 September 1952
- Preceded by: Jaap Burger
- Succeeded by: Jaap Burger
- Parliamentary group: Labour Party

Member of the House of Representatives
- In office 2 October 1935 – 2 September 1952
- Parliamentary group: Labour Party (1946–1952); Social Democratic; Workers' Party (1935–1946)

Personal details
- Born: Leendert Antonie Donker; 7 September 1899 Almkerk, Netherlands
- Died: 4 February 1956 (aged 56) Rotterdam, Netherlands
- Cause of death: Heart attack
- Party: Labour Party (from 1946)
- Other political affiliations: Social Democratic; Workers' Party (1921–1946)
- Spouses: Anna Elisabeth Maria Bosma (m. 1926; div. 1938) Georgina Frederika Au-gusta Carstens (m. 1938)
- Education: University of Amsterdam (Bachelor of Laws, Master of Laws)
- Occupation: Politician; Jurist; Lawyer

Leendert Antonie "Leen" Donker (7 September 1899 – 4 February 1956) was a Dutch politician who served as the Minister of Justice in the Second Drees cabinet from 1952 until his death from a heart attack in 1956.
