= Royal Netherlands Historical Society =

Historical society in the Netherlands

- Koninklijk Nederlands Historisch Genootschap
- Abbreviation: KNHG
- Formation: 1845
- Type: Historical society
- Headquarters: Korte Spinhuissteeg 3, 1012 CG Amsterdam
- President: Susan Legêne
- Main organ: BMGN: Low Countries Historical Review
- Affiliations: International Committee of Historical Sciences
- Website: knhg.nl

The Royal Netherlands Historical Society (Dutch: Koninklijk Nederlands Historisch Genootschap, or KNHG), founded 1845 under the name Historisch Gezelschap, is a historical society that also functions as a professional association of academic historians in the Netherlands. It represents the Netherlands in the International Committee of Historical Sciences.

The KNHG holds two annual conferences, one in the spring and one in the autumn, and publishes an open access journal, BMGN: Low Countries Historical Review.

== Studies ==
- Leen Dorsman and Ed Jonker, Anderhalve eeuw geschiedenis: (Nederlands) Historisch Genootschap, 1845-1995 (The Hague, 1995).
