= Leiderdorp =

- Municipality
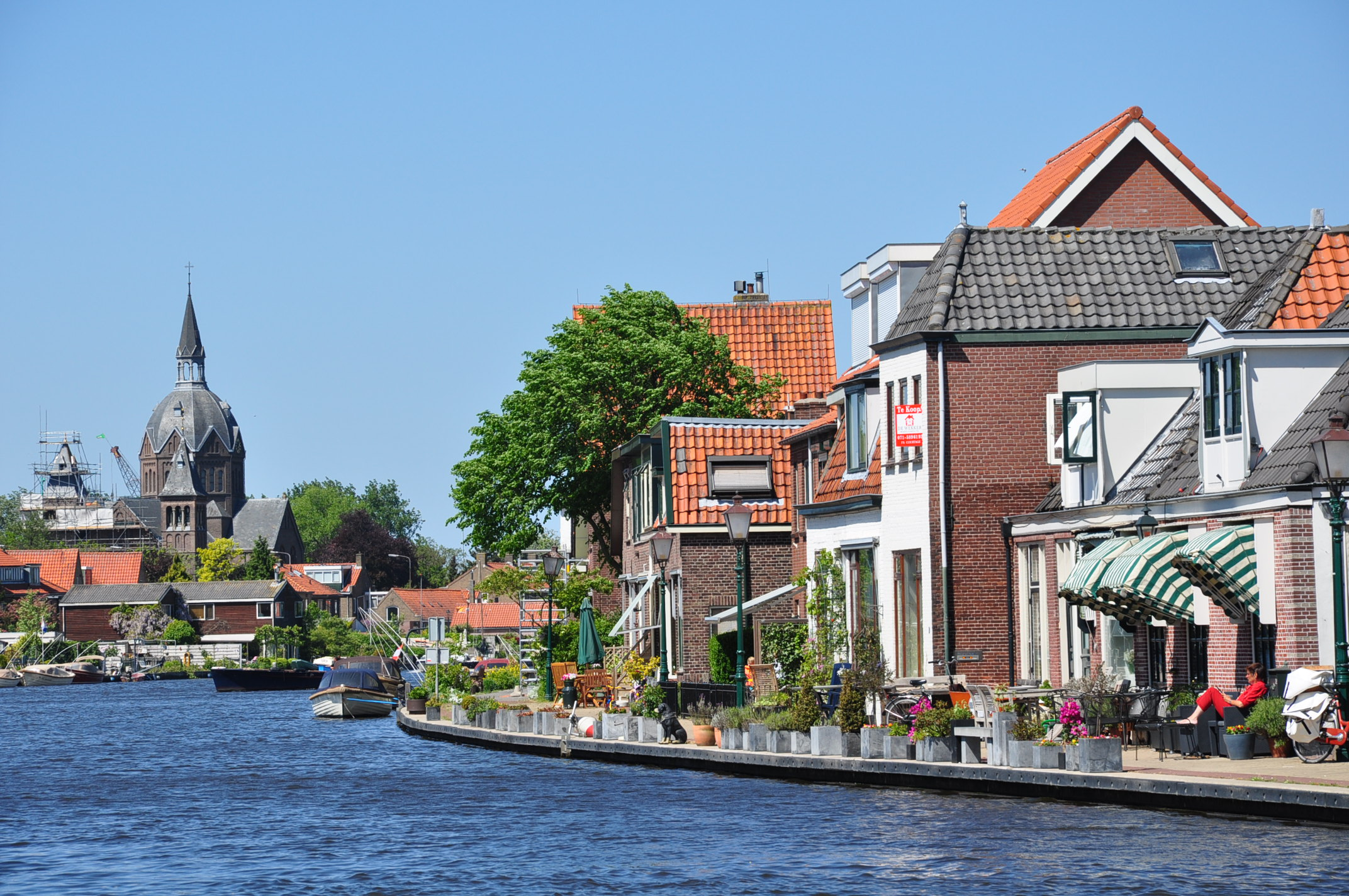
- The Oude Rijn passing by Leiderdorp

- Flag Coat of arms

- Location in South Holland
- Coordinates: 52°10′N 4°32′E
- Country: Netherlands
- Province: South Holland

Government
  - Body: Municipal council
  - Mayor: Tjarda Struik (as of 14 November 2023)

Area
  - Total: 12.28 km^{2} (4.74 sq mi)
  - Land: 11.58 km^{2} (4.47 sq mi)
  - Water: 0.70 km^{2} (0.27 sq mi)
- Elevation: 0 m (0 ft)

Population (January 2021)
  - Total: 27,377
  - Density: 2,364/km^{2} (6,120/sq mi)
- Demonym: Leiderdorper
- Time zone: UTC+1 (CET)
  - Summer (DST): UTC+2 (CEST)
- Postcode: 2350–2353
- Area code: 071
- Website: www.leiderdorp.nl

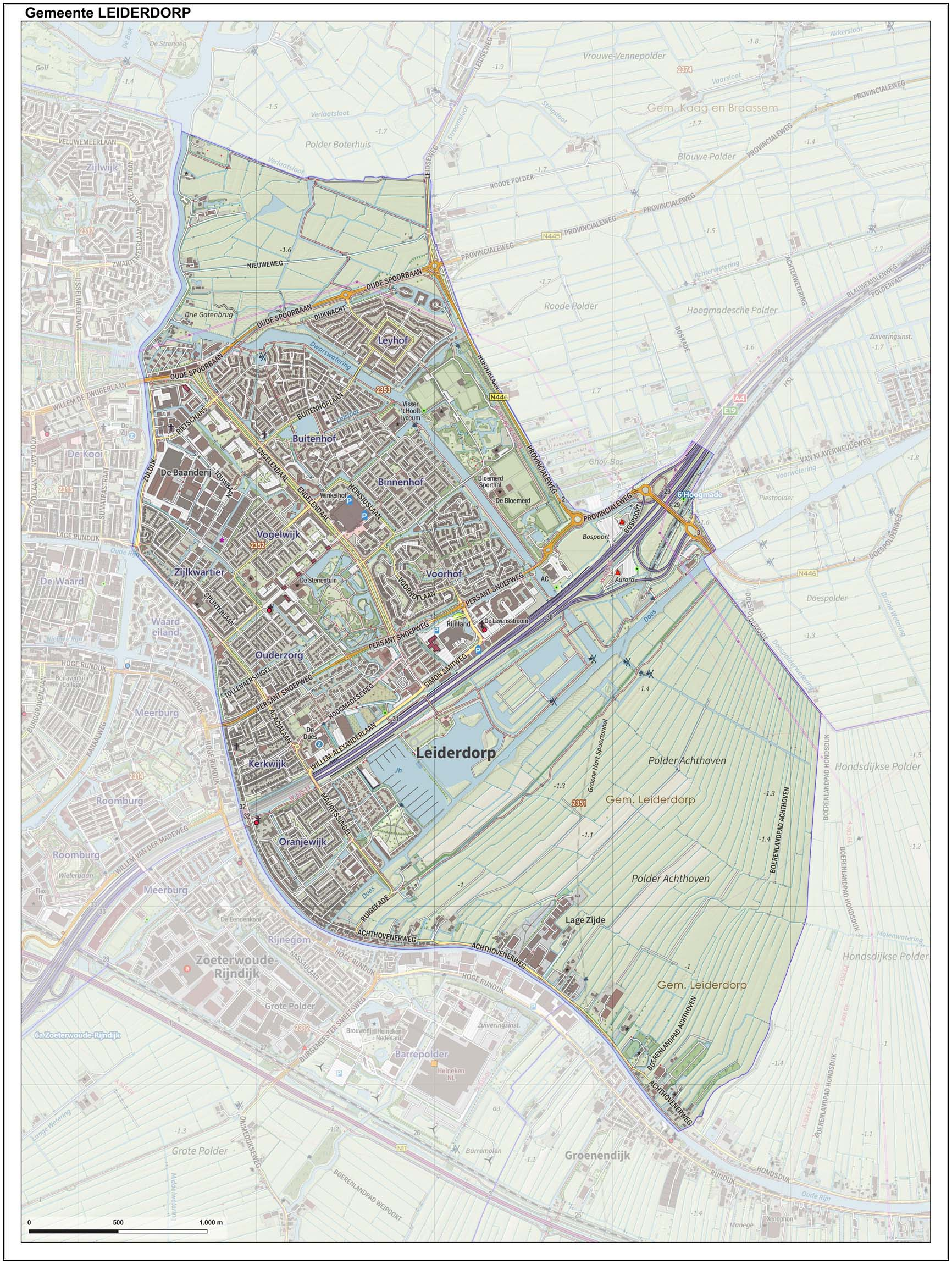
Topographic map of the municipality of Leiderdorp, June 2015

Leiderdorp (Dutch pronunciation: [ˌlɛidərˈdɔr(ə)p]) is a town and municipality in the western Netherlands, in the province of South Holland near the city of Leiden. It had a population of 27,377 in 2021.

The municipality covers an area of 12.28 km^{2} (4.74 sq mi) of which 0.70 km^{2} (0.27 sq mi) is water. Leiderdorp is located next to the city of Leiden, although the Oude Rijn (Old Rhine) river and the Zijl river separate the two. The HSL-Zuid high-speed rail line between Amsterdam and Brussels crosses Leiderdorp in a tunnel.

It is one of the oldest towns in South Holland province and was a base for the Spanish army in the Eighty Years' War.

== History ==
Excavations have shown that as early as during the Iron Age in the area of current day Leiderdorp hunters and fishers roamed around and lived on the dry places around the river.

=== Roman period ===
The Rhine, which passes through Leiderdorp, functioned as the Northern border of the Roman Empire. Close to Leiderdorp, the Romans built a fort, Matilo. Around the fall of the Western Roman Empire the Romans retreated from the area.

=== Middle Ages ===
During the middle ages, the first permanent settlement appeared. The Rhine served as a connection between the sea and the hinterland, and there is evidence of trade taking place. During the late Middle Ages three castles were built in Leiderdorp, Huis ter Zijl (1260), Huis ter Does (around 1300) and Huis Berendrecht (around 1420).

In 1396 the Augustinian monastery Engelendael was founded. The monks copied books, cared for the sick and worked the fields. The monastery was abandoned in 1574, but its legacy is still present as the arterial road of Leiderdorp is called Engelendaal.

=== Eighty Years' War ===
In 1492 the first bridge crossing the Rhine was built. In 1514 Leiderdorps population had grown to 500. During the Siege of Leiden Leiderdorp was the headquarters of the Spanish General Francisco de Valdez, who ultimately failed to capture the city. In 1620 the Protestant Dorpskerk (town church) is constructed. The Dorpskerk celebrated its 400th anniversary in 2020 with a series of concerts and exhibitions.

=== 1700–1940 ===
From 1597 till 1795 Leiden had administrative rights over Leiderdorp, which led to the town becoming even more dependent on the larger city. In 1795 Leiderdorp decreases in size as the neighbouring Leiden expands. A rope factory was constructed in 1806, and in 1862 the first school was established on the Hoofdstraat (main street). A shipyard was constructed in 1877, and in 1915 social housing designed by famous Dutch architect Willem Marinus Dudok was erected.

=== Second World War ===
During the Second World war a bunker was constructed in the neighbouring fields, and a pen factory and community centre were destroyed to make way for it. The spires of one of the churches was used as a sniper's nest.

== Notable people ==
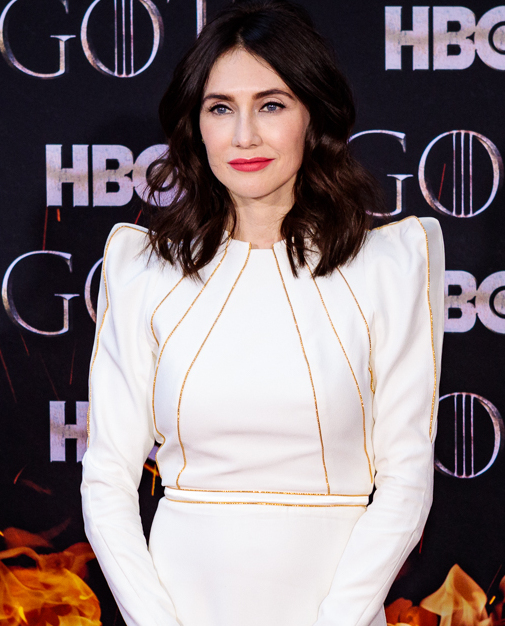
Carice van Houten, 2019

- The Reverend Pierre Jacques Smit (1863 – 1960) an illustrator at the British Natural History Museum
- Gerrit de Blanken (1894 – 1961) a Dutch potter
- Armin van Buuren (born 1976) trance music producer and DJ, lived in Leiderdorp
- Carice van Houten (born 1976) a Dutch actress and singer
- Thomas Erdbrink (born 1976) chief of the Tehran Bureau of The New York Times
- Dennis Leeflang (born 1979) a Dutch rock drummer, currently lives in Los Angeles
- Thomas Azier (born 1987) electro-pop singer and musician
- Robert de Hoog (born 1988) a Dutch actor
- Daphne Groeneveld (born 1994) a Dutch model
- Chris Stassy (born 1994) house DJ and producer

=== Sport ===
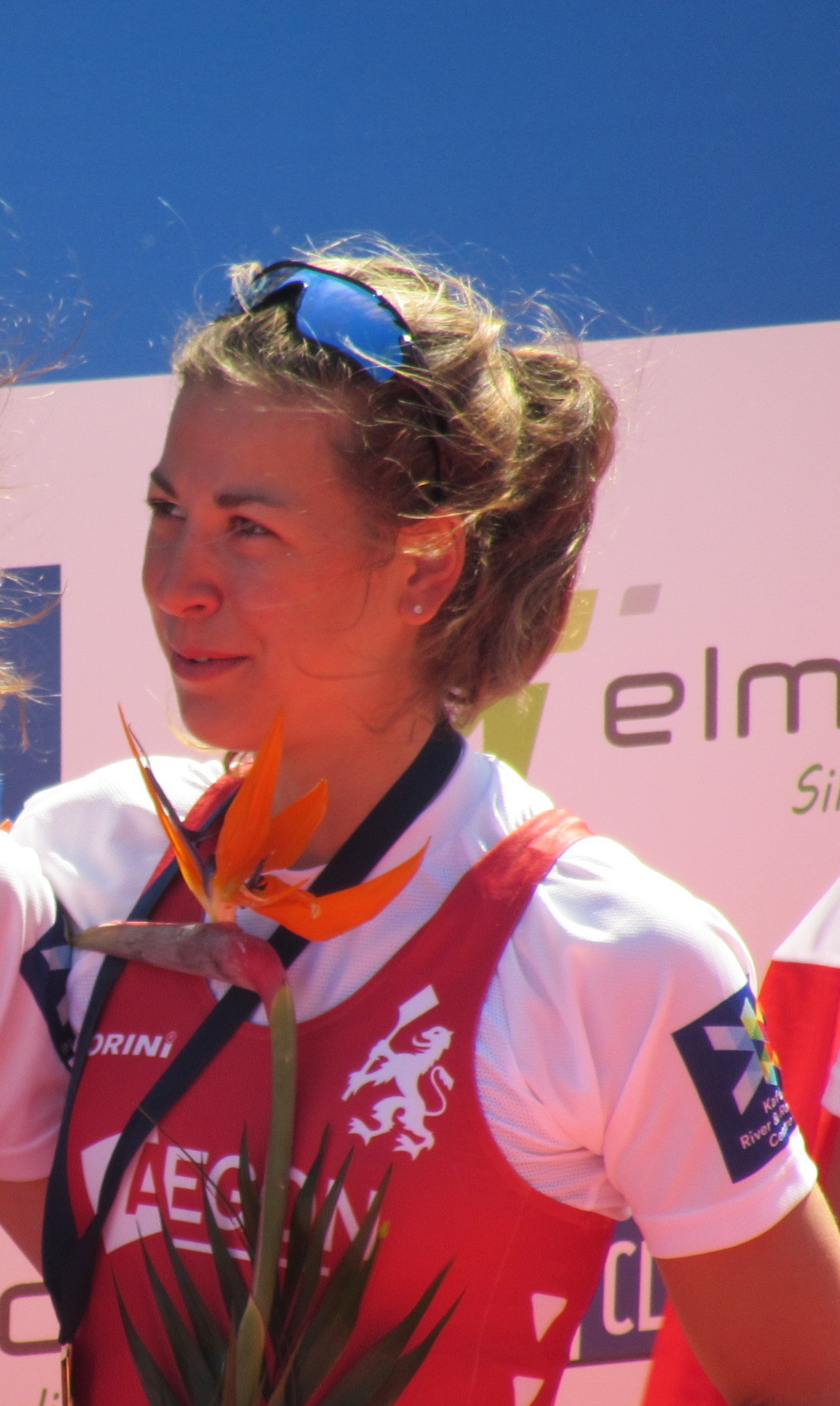
Ilse Paulis, 2016

- Marcel Vonk (born 1974) poker player and academic researcher in string theory
- Sylvia Karres (born 1976) a retired field hockey player, team silver medallist at the 2004 Summer Olympics
- Femke Dekker (born 1979) a Dutch rower, team silver medallist at the 2008 Summer Olympics
- Taeke Taekema (born 1980) a Dutch field hockey player, team silver medallist at the 2004 Summer Olympics
- Noeki Klein (born 1983) women's water polo player, team gold medallist at the 2008 Summer Olympics
- Regina Bruins (born 1986) professional cyclist, lives in Leiderdorp
- Ted Jan Bloemen, (born 1986) Dutch-Canadian long track speed skater, gold medallist at the 2018 Winter Olympics
- Jens Toornstra (born 1989) a Dutch footballer with 300 club caps
- Ilse Paulis (born 1993) a Dutch rower, team gold medallist at the 2016 Summer Olympics
- Max van Splunteren (born 1996), racing driver
- Bente Paulis (born 1997) a Dutch rower, silver medallist at the 2024 Summer Olympics in the quadruple sculls.
- Noussair Mazraoui (born 1997) Moroccan professional footballer.
- Matthijs de Ligt (born 1999) professional footballer, 45 caps with the Netherlands national team
- Jeroen Kampschreur (born 1999) a Dutch paralympic skier

== Twin towns ==
Until 2013 Leiderdorp was twinned with

- Šamorín, in Slovakia.

== Gallery ==
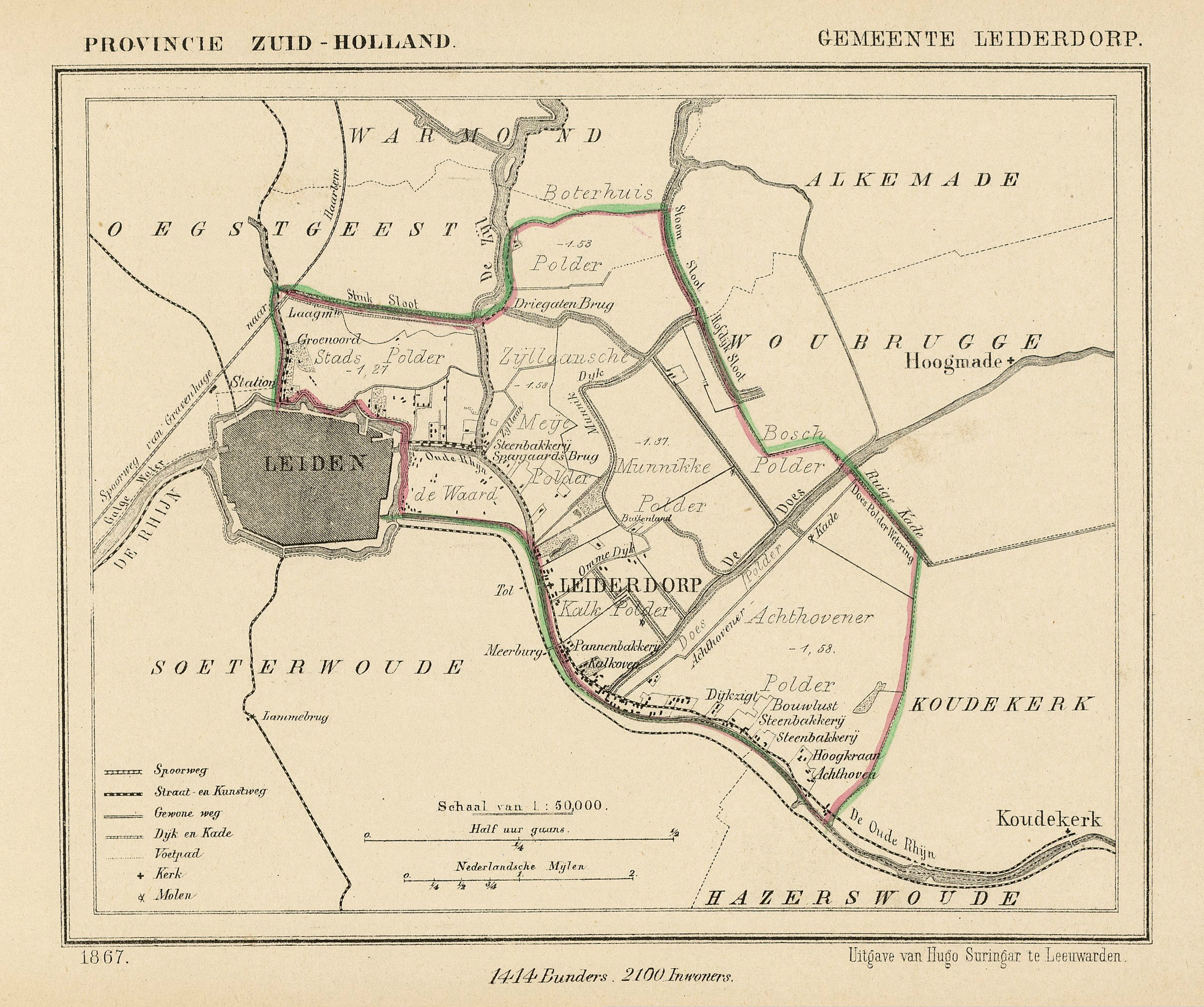
Leiderdorp, map of 1867.

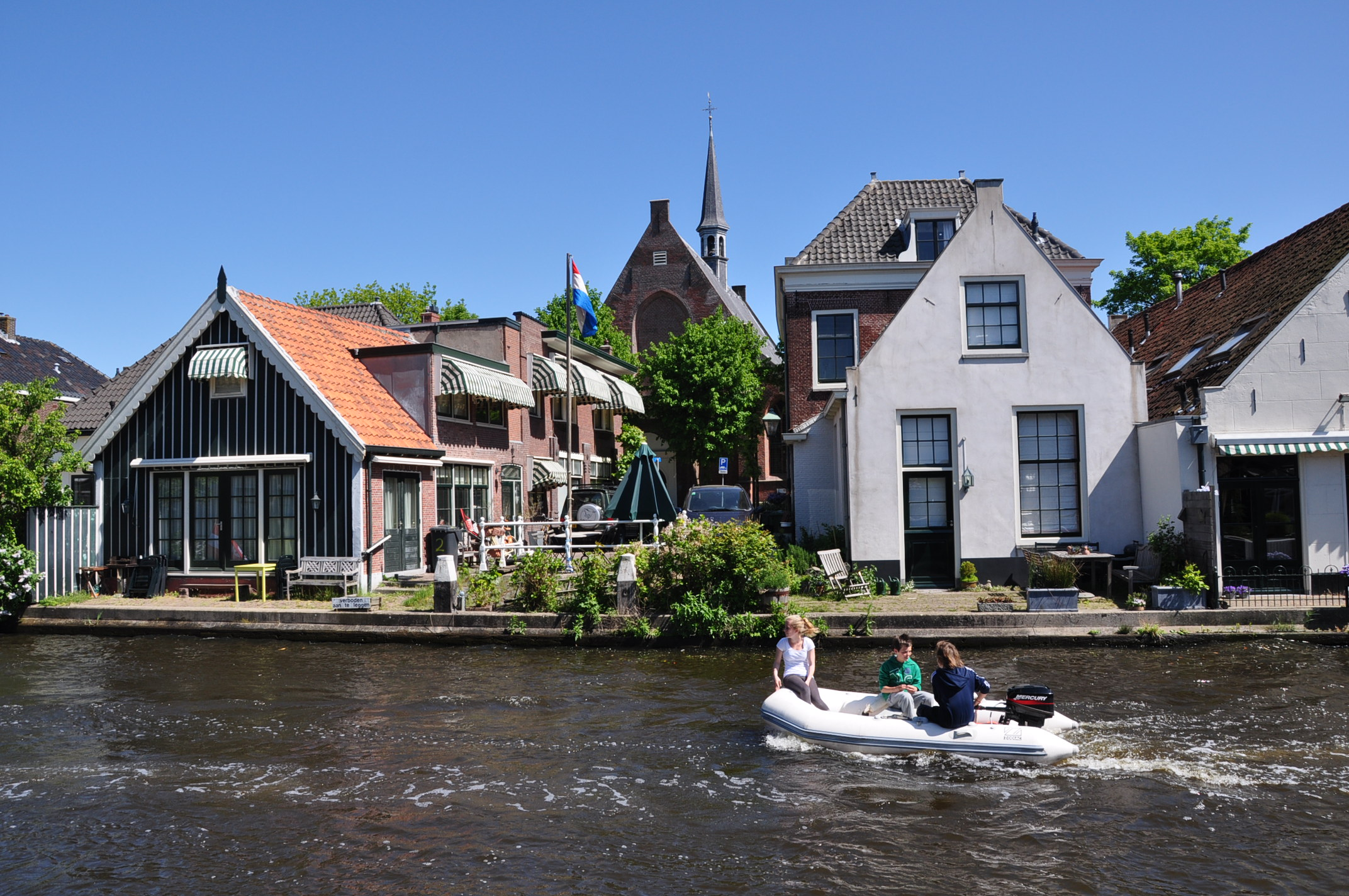
Town centre on the Old Rhine.

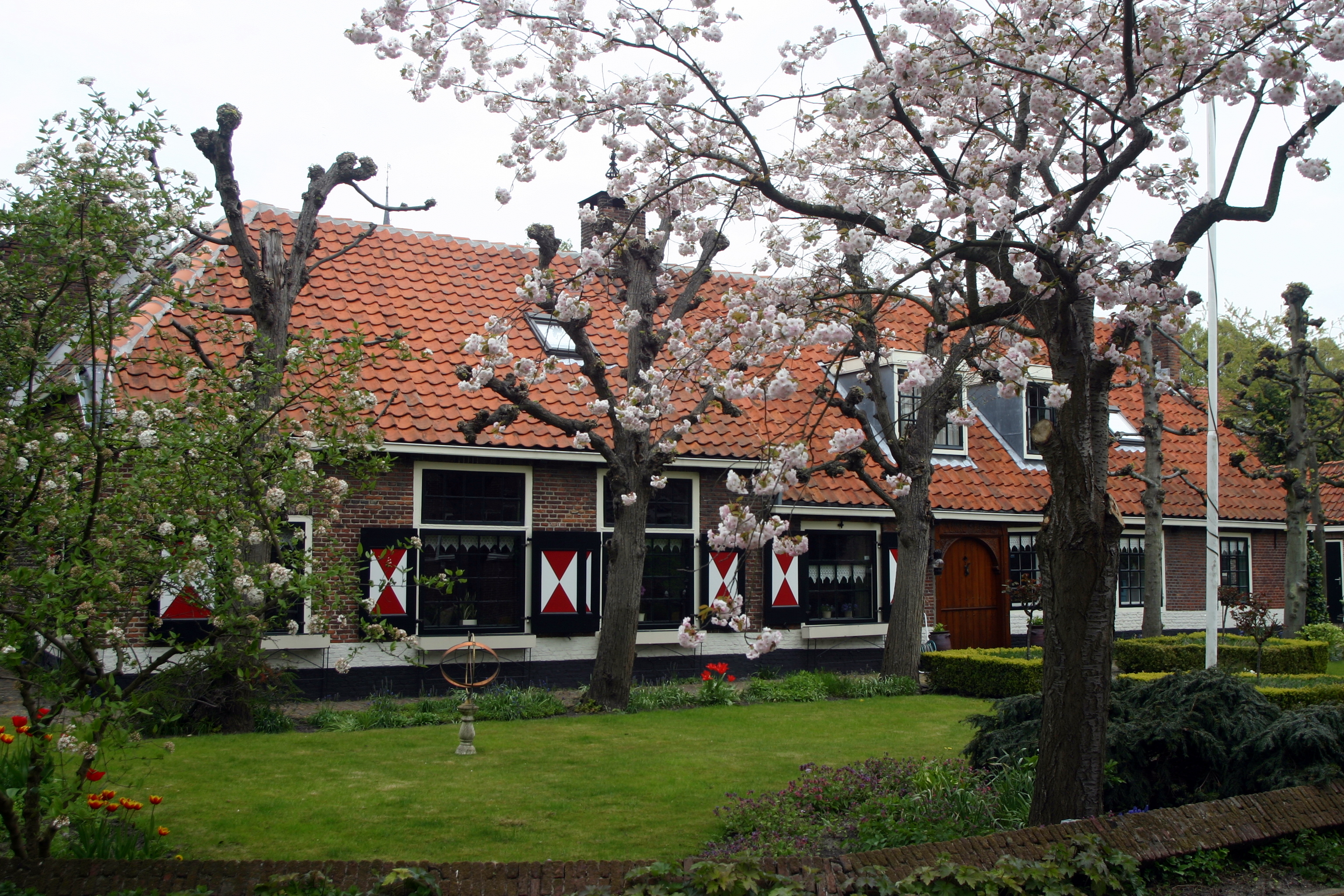
Listed farm in spring

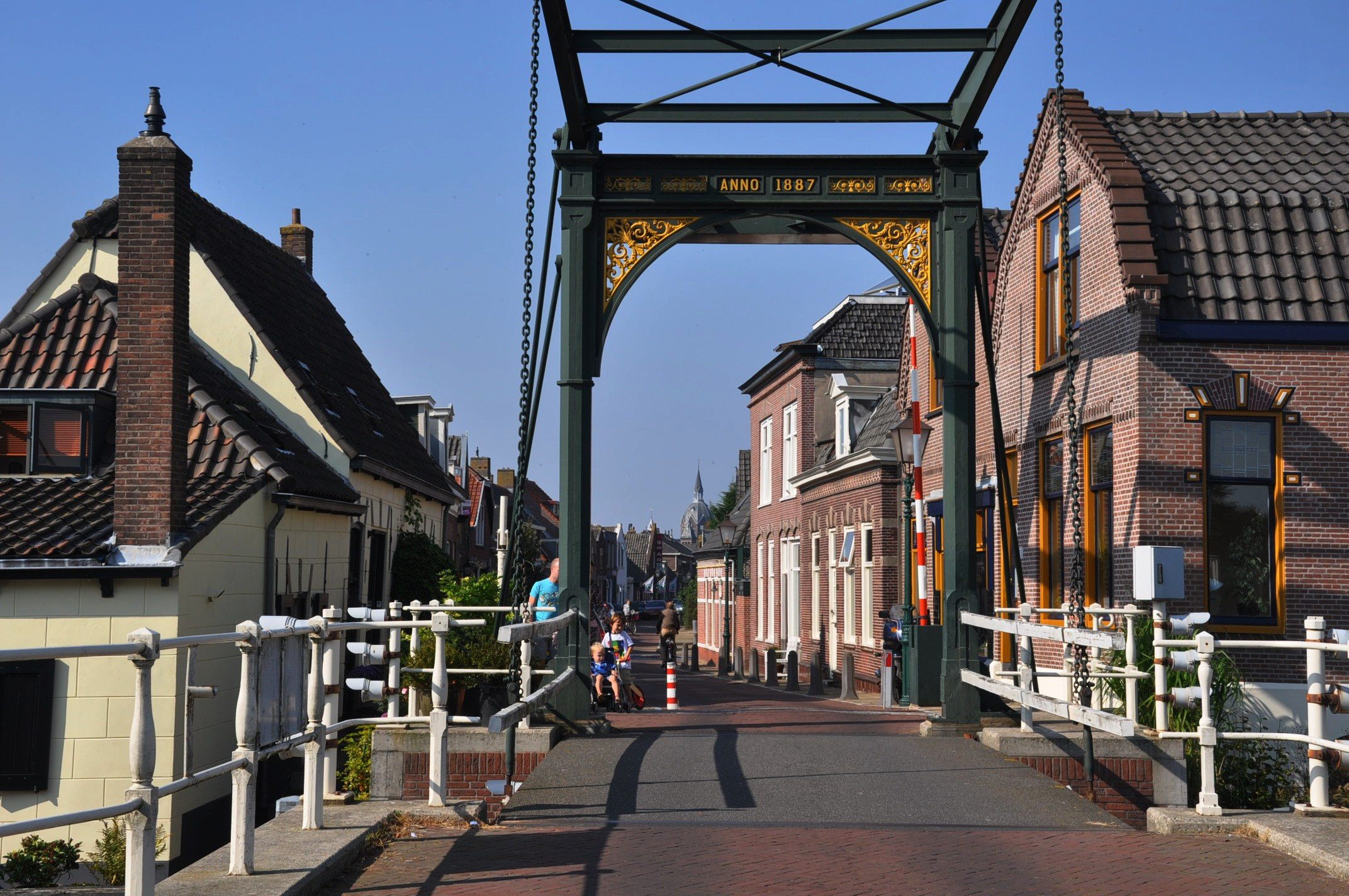
Leiderdorp, Does

== See also ==
- Zijl Visser't hooft leiden
